= 2013–14 Dundee F.C. season =

Dundee
2013–14 season
- Chairman: Bill Colvin
- Manager: John Brown (until 3 February 2014); Paul Hartley (from 3 February 2014)
- Stadium: Dens Park; Dundee, Scotland
- Championship: 1st (champions, promoted)
- League Cup: 3rd Round
- Scottish Cup: 4th Round
- Challenge Cup: Quarter-finals
- Top goalscorer: League: Peter MacDonald (17 goals); All: Peter MacDonald (18 goals)
- Highest home attendance: 10,718 vs. Dumbarton, 3 May 2014
- Lowest home attendance: 1,615 vs. Stenhousemuir, 7 September 2013
- Average home league attendance: 4,738
Home colours	Away colours

The 2013–14 season was Dundee's first season back in the Scottish Championship after being relegated from the Scottish Premiership, the top flight in Scottish football.

Dundee also competed in the Scottish Cup, the League Cup and the Challenge Cup.

== Results and fixtures ==
Win Draw Loss Postponed

=== Scottish Championship ===
10 August 2013 1	Queen of the South	4–3	Dundee	Palmerston Park, Dumfries
15:00	Lyle 45'; McGuffie 59' (pen.); Russell 63'; Paton 70'	Report	MacDonald 8'; Gallagher 80'; Davidson 89'	Attendance: 2,644; Referee: Brian Colvin

17 August 2013 2	Dundee	1–0	Alloa Athletic	Dens Park, Dundee
15:00	McBride 90' (pen.)	Report		Attendance: 4,167; Referee: Euan Norris

24 August 2013 3	Raith Rovers	0–0	Dundee	Stark's Park, Kirkcaldy
15:00		Report		Attendance: 2,603; Referee: John Beaton

30 August 2013 4	Dundee	3–0	Livingston	Dens Park, Dundee
19:45	Monti 33' (pen.); Gallagher 58'; MacDonald 83'	Report		Attendance: 3,955; Referee: Brian Colvin

14 September 2013 5	Dundee	0–0	Hamilton Academical	Dens Park, Dundee
15:00		Report		Attendance: 4,155

21 September 2013 6	Falkirk	3–1	Dundee	Falkirk Stadium, Falkirk
15:00	Loy 12', 65'; Fulton 55'	Report	Conroy 74'	Attendance: 3,349; Referee: Willie Collum

28 September 2013 7	Dundee	3–1	Greenock Morton	Dens Park, Dundee
15:00	MacDonald 47', 50'; Beattie 71'	Report	Peciar 23'	Attendance: 3,870; Referee: Iain Brines

5 October 2013 8	Cowdenbeath	0–2	Dundee	Central Park, Cowdenbeath
15:00		Report	Beattie 36'; Conroy 82'	Attendance: 1,013; Referee: Greg Aitken

12 October 2013 9	Dumbarton	1–4	Dundee	Dumbarton Football Stadium, Dumbarton
15:00	Nish (yellow card) 30' (yellow-red card) 58'; Kirkpatrick 78'	Report	MacDonald 49', 71' (pen.); Conroy 68'; Rae 88'	Attendance: 1,175; Referee: Barry Cook

19 October 2013 10	Dundee	2–1	Queen of the South	Dens Park, Dundee
15:00	MacDonald 78'; Beattie 89'	Report	Lyle 80'	Attendance: 4,357; Referee: Steven McLean

26 October 2013 11	Livingston	2–1	Dundee	Almondvale Stadium, Livingston
15:00	Jacobs 55'; Scott 88'	Report	MacDonald 54'	Attendance: 1,597; Referee: Craig Charleston

9 November 2013 12	Dundee	2–0	Raith Rovers	Dens Park, Dundee
15:00	Conroy 28'; Wighton 49'			Attendance: 5,064; Referee: Andrew Dallas

16 November 2013 13	Dundee	1–1	Falkirk	Dens Park, Dundee
15:00	Conroy 24' (pen.)	Report	Leahy 90+3'	Attendance: 4,661; Referee: Stevie O'Reilly

23 November 2013 14	Hamilton Academical	0–3	Dundee	New Douglas Park, Hamilton
15:00		Report	Davidson 16'; Gallagher 57'; MacDonald 90'	Attendance: 2,077; Referee: Bobby Madden

7 December 2013 15	Greenock Morton	1–2	Dundee	Cappielow, Greenock
15:00	Imrie 59'	Report	Beattie 17'; Gallagher 45'	Attendance: 1,536; Referee: Crawford Allan

14 December 2013 16	Dundee	1–2	Cowdenbeath	Dens Park, Dundee
15:00	McAlister 65'	Report	Hemmings 52'; Morton 70'	Attendance: 3,533; Referee: George Salmond

21 December 2013 17	Alloa Athletic	0–1	Dundee	Recreation Park, Alloa
15:00		Report	MacDonald 68'; Davidson (red card) 90+2'	Attendance: 1,170

28 December 2013 18	Dundee	3–0	Dumbarton	Dens Park, Dundee
15:00	MacDonald 47', 90'; McBride 82'	Report		Attendance: 4,489; Referee: Brian Colvin

2 January 2014 19	Raith Rovers	0–2	Dundee	Stark's Park, Kirkcaldy
15:00	Thomson (yellow card) 53' (yellow-red card) 67'	Report	McAlister 90+1', 90+3'	Attendance: 4,039; Referee: Don Robertson

11 January 2014 20	Dundee	0–1	Livingston	Dens Park, Dundee
15:00		Report	Burchill 11'	Attendance: 4,367; Referee: Steven McLean

25 January 2014 21	Falkirk	2–0	Dundee	Falkirk Stadium, Falkirk
15:00	McGrandles 16'; Loy 73'	Report	Letheren (red card) 45+1'	Attendance: 4,183; Referee: Bobby Madden

1 February 2014 22	Dundee	1–1	Alloa Athletic	Dens Park, Dundee
15:00	Conroy 69' (pen.)	Report	Gordon 90+4'	Attendance: 4,021; Referee: Craig Charleston

8 February 2014 23	Dundee	1–0	Hamilton Academical	Dens Park, Dundee
15:00	Boyle 6'	Report	Hendrie (red card) 51'; Gordon (yellow card) 11' (yellow-red card) 62'	Attendance: 5,206; Referee: Stephen Finnie

15 February 2014 24	Queen of the South	0–1	Dundee	Palmerston Park, Dumfries
15:00	Atkinson (red card) 44'	Report	Conroy 45+1' (pen.)	Attendance: 2,152; Referee: Barry Cook

25 February 2014 25	Cowdenbeath	2–0	Dundee	Central Park, Cowdenbeath
15:00	McKeown 33'; Stewart 81'	Report		Attendance: 1,419; Referee: John McKendrick

1 March 2014 26	Dundee	2–0	Greenock Morton	Dens Park, Dundee
15:00	Nadé 13'; MacDonald 86'	Report		Attendance: 4,488; Referee: George Salmond

15 March 2014 27	Livingston	0–2	Dundee	Almondvale Stadium, Livingston
15:00		Report	MacDonald 8'; Benedictus 55'	Attendance: 1,759; Referee: Don Robertson

18 March 2014 28	Dundee	0–0	Raith Rovers	Dens Park, Dundee
19:45		Report		Attendance: 4,561; Referee: Stephen Finnie

22 March 2014 29	Dumbarton	0–1	Dundee	Dumbarton Football Stadium, Dumbarton
15:00		Report	MacDonald 83'	Attendance: 1,222; Referee: Brian Colvin

25 March 2014 30	Dundee	1–0	Queen of the South	Dens Park, Dundee
19:45	Davidson 58'	Report		Attendance: 3,999

29 March 2014 31	Dundee	0–1	Falkirk	Dens Park, Dundee
15:00		Report	Beck 19'	Attendance: 4,919; Referee: John McKendrick

5 April 2014 32	Hamilton Academical	1–1	Dundee	New Douglas Park, Hamilton
15:00	Antoine-Curier 71'	Report	Boyle 37'	Attendance: 4,529; Referee: Willie Collum

12 April 2014 33	Dundee	4–0	Cowdenbeath	Dens Park, Dundee
15:00	Wighton 6'; Boyle 45+1', 66'; McAlister 60'	Report		Attendance: 4,751; Referee: Craig Thomson

19 April 2014 34	Greenock Morton	1–0	Dundee	Cappielow, Greenock
15:00	Imrie 78'	Report		Attendance: 2,117; Referee: Mat Northcroft

26 April 2014 35	Alloa Athletic	0–3	Dundee	Recreation Park, Alloa
15:00	Meggatt (yellow card) 64' (yellow-red card) 71'	Report	Nadé 42'; MacDonald 71' (pen.); Beattie 88'	Attendance: 2,552; Referee: John Beaton

3 May 2014 36	Dundee	2–1	Dumbarton	Dens Park, Dundee
15:00	Nadé 25'; MacDonald 36'	Report	Agnew 69' (pen.)	Attendance: 10,718; Referee: Bobby Madden

=== Scottish League Cup ===
27 August 2013 Second Round	Dundee	2–1 (a.e.t.)	Forfar Athletic	Dens Park, Dundee
19:45	McAlister 51'; MacDonald 120'	Report	Campbell 43'	Attendance: 2,027; Referee: Barry Cook

24 September 2013 Third Round	Dundee	0–1	Inverness Caledonian Thistle	Dens Park, Dundee
19:45		Report	McKay 11'	Attendance: 1,682; Referee: Stephen Finnie

=== Scottish Cup ===
30 November 2013 Fourth Round	Dundee	0–1	Raith Rovers	Dens Park, Dundee
15:00		Report	Irvine 8' (o.g.)	Attendance: 3,184; Referee: Steven McLean

=== Scottish Challenge Cup ===
27 July 2013 First Round	Alloa Athletic	0–1	Dundee	Recreation Park, Alloa
15:00		Report	Monti 60' (pen.)	Referee: Kevin Clancy

20 August 2013 Second Round	Dundee	3–1 (a.e.t.)	Forfar Athletic	Dens Park, Dundee
19:45	McBride 80'; MacDonald 97', 120'	Report	Malcolm 52'	Attendance: 2,052; Referee: Crawford Allan

7 September 2013 Quarter-finals	Dundee	1–1 (a.e.t.) (4–5 p)	Stenhousemuir	Dens Park, Dundee
15:00	MacDonald 52' (pen.)	Report	Higgins 63'	Attendance: 1,615; Referee: John McKendrick

== Player statistics ==
During the 2013–14 season, Dundee have used 27 players in competitive games. The table below shows the number of appearances and goals scored by each player.

As of 3 May 2014.

No.	Pos	Nat	Player	Total		Championship		League Cup		Scottish Cup		Challenge Cup	
No.	Pos	Nat	Player	Apps	Goals	Apps	Goals	Apps	Goals	Apps	Goals	Apps	Goals
1	GK	(Wales) WAL	Kyle Letheren	39	0	35+0	0	2+0	0	1+0	0	1+0	0
2	DF	(Scotland) SCO	Gary Irvine	37	0	33+0	0	2+0	0	1+0	0	1+0	0
3	DF	(England) ENG	Matt Lockwood	19	0	17+0	0	1+0	0	1+0	0	0+0	0
5	DF	(Scotland) SCO	Willie Dyer	24	0	21+0	0	2+0	0	0+0	0	0+1	0
6	MF	(Scotland) SCO	Iain Davidson	29	3	25+1	3	1+0	0	1+0	0	1+0	0
7	MF	(Scotland) SCO	Nicky Riley	30	0	18+9	0	1+0	0	1+0	0	0+1	0
8	MF	(Scotland) SCO	Kevin McBride	27	2	19+6	2	1+0	0	0+0	0	1+0	0
9	FW	(Scotland) SCO	Peter MacDonald	39	18	33+2	17	2+0	1	1+0	0	1+0	0
10	MF	(Scotland) SCO	Gavin Rae	40	1	34+2	1	2+0	0	1+0	0	1+0	0
11	MF	(Scotland) SCO	Ryan Conroy	36	7	20+12	7	2+0	0	1+0	0	1+0	0
12	GK	(Scotland) SCO	John Gibson	1	0	0+1	0	0+0	0	0+0	0	0+0	0
16	MF	(Scotland) SCO	Steven Doris	14	0	2+10	0	0+1	0	0+0	0	0+1	0
17	DF	(Scotland) SCO	Kyle Benedictus	18	1	15+2	1	0+0	0	0+0	0	1+0	0
18	DF	(Scotland) SCO	Declan Gallagher	40	4	36+0	4	2+0	0	1+0	0	1+0	0
20	MF	(Scotland) SCO	Jim McAlister	40	5	36+0	4	2+0	1	1+0	0	1+0	0
23	FW	(Scotland) SCO	Martin Boyle	31	4	18+11	4	0+1	0	0+1	0	0+0	0
24	GK	(Czech Republic) CZE	Dan Twardzik	2	0	1+1	0	0+0	0	0+0	0	0+0	0
27	FW	(France) FRA	Christian Nadé	13	3	6+7	3	0+0	0	0+0	0	0+0	0
29	FW	(Scotland) SCO	Craig Beattie	20	5	8+10	5	1+0	0	0+1	0	0+0	0
30	DF	(Scotland) SCO	Cammy Kerr	3	0	2+1	0	0+0	0	0+0	0	0+0	0
33	FW	(Scotland) SCO	Craig Wighton	14	2	7+6	2	0+0	0	1+0	0	0+0	0
Players who left the club during the 2013–14 season
4	MF	(Scotland) SCO	Stephen O'Donnell	1	0	0+1	0	0+0	0	0+0	0	0+0	0
14	FW	(Scotland) SCO	Leighton McIntosh (on loan to Arbroath F.C.)	2	0	0+2	0	0+0	0	0+0	0	0+0	0
15	FW	(Scotland) SCO	Carlo Monti	17	2	7+7	1	1+0	0	0+1	0	1+0	1
21	DF	(Scotland) SCO	James Thomson (on loan to East Fife F.C.)	0	0	0+0	0	0+0	0	0+0	0	0+0	0
22	MF	(Scotland) SCO	Jamie Reid (on loan to Montrose F.C.)	4	0	0+4	0	0+0	0	0+0	0	0+0	0
25	DF	(Scotland) SCO	Adam Cummins	3	0	2+1	0	0+0	0	0+0	0	0+0	0
26	MF	(Scotland) SCO	Stephen Hughes	1	0	1+0	0	0+0	0	0+0	0	0+0	0
28	MF	(England) ENG	Sean Bonnett-Johnson	0	0	0+0	0	0+0	0	0+0	0	0+0	0
41	FW	(Scotland) SCO	Thomas Carberry	0	0	0+0	0	0+0	0	0+0	0	0+0	0

== Team statistics ==
=== League table ===
Pos	Team	Pld	W	D	L	GF	GA	GD	Pts	Promotion, qualification or relegation
1	Dundee (C, P)	36	21	6	9	54	26	+28	69	Promotion to the Premiership
2	Hamilton Academical (O, P)	36	19	10	7	68	41	+27	67	Qualification for the Premiership play-off semi-final
3	Falkirk	36	19	9	8	59	33	+26	66	Qualification for the Premiership play-off quarter-final
4	Queen of the South	36	16	7	13	53	39	+14	55	Qualification for the Premiership play-off quarter-final
5	Dumbarton	36	15	6	15	65	64	+1	51	

Source: Soccerway
Rules for classification: 1) points; 2) goal difference; 3) number of goals scored.
(C) Champions; (O) Play-off winners; (P) Promoted

== Transfers ==
=== In ===
Date	Position	Nationality	Name	From	Fee
5 June 2013	FW	(Scotland)	Peter MacDonald	Morton	Undisclosed
5 June 2013	DF	(Scotland)	Willie Dyer	Morton	Undisclosed
6 June 2013	MF	(Scotland)	Gavin Rae	Aberdeen	Free
6 June 2013	MF	(Wales)	Kyle Letheren	Free agent	
9 July 2013	FW	(Scotland)	Carlo Monti	Pollok	Free
9 July 2013	FW	(Scotland)	Steven Doris	Arbroath	Free
19 August 2013	GK	(Czech Republic)	Dan Twardzik	Aberdeen	Free
11 September 2013	FW	(Scotland)	Craig Beattie	Free agent	
9 January 2014	DF	(Scotland)	Adam Cummins	Motherwell	Loan
13 January 2014	MF	(Scotland)	Stephen Hughes	East Fife	Free
16 January 2014	FW	(France)	Christian Nadé	Free agent	

=== Out ===
Date	Position	Nationality	Name	To	Fee
31 May 2013	FW	(Scotland)	John Baird	Partick Thistle	Free
1 July 2013	FW	(Scotland)	Lewis Toshney	Celtic	Return from loan
1 July 2013	FW	(Scotland)	Colin Nish	Hartlepool United	Return from loan
1 July 2013	MF	(Scotland)	Gary Harkins	St Mirren	Free
1 July 2013	GK	(England)	Steve Simonsen	Free agent	
1 July 2013	FW	(Scotland)	Brian Easton	St Johnstone	Free
1 July 2013	FW	(Scotland)	Steven Milne	Arbroath	Free
1 July 2013	FW	(Scotland)	Jamie McCluskey	Free agent	
1 July 2013	MF	(Italy)	Davide Grassi	Aris Limassol	Free
1 July 2013	MF	(Scotland)	Graham Webster	Montrose	Free
23 July 2013	GK	(Scotland)	Rab Douglas	Forfar Athletic	Free
30 July 2013	DF	(Scotland)	Neil McGregor	Hurlford United	Free
16 August 2013	FW	(Scotland)	Mark Stewart	Luton Town	Free
19 August 2013	FW	(England)	Carl Finnigan	Chippa United	Free
5 December 2013	MF	(Scotland)	Jamie Reid	Montrose	Loan
31 January 2014	FW	(Scotland)	Leighton McIntosh	Arbroath	Loan
10 April 2014	FW	(Scotland)	Carlo Monti	Free agent	
