= 2010–11 Dundee F.C. season =

Dundee
2010–11 season
- Chairman: Stuart Murphy
- Manager: Gordon Chisholm (until 15 October 2010); Barry Smith (from 15 October 2010)
- Stadium: Dens Park
- Scottish First Division: 6th
- Scottish Cup: Fourth Round, Losers v Motherwell
- League Cup: Second Round, Losers v Brechin City
- Alba Challenge Cup: Second Round, Losers v Stenhousemuir
- Top goalscorer: League: Sean Higgins (9); All: Leigh Griffiths (12)
- Highest home attendance: 7,746 (vs Partick Thistle, 30 April 2011)
- Lowest home attendance: 3,503 (vs Cowdenbeath, 14 December 2010)
- Average home league attendance: 4,728
Home colours	Away colours

The 2010–11 season was Dundee's 6th consecutive season in the Scottish First Division after being relegated from the SPL in 2005.

== Season summary ==
Dundee had an average start to the season, but results dramatically improved despite going into administration culminating in the release of their manager Gordon Chisholm, his assistant Billy Dodds, and nine players. As a result of going into administration on 1 November 2010, the Dee were given a 25-point deduction as punishment. After the punishment was imposed, Dundee were left bottom of the First Division table with -11 points, 20 points behind the second-bottom team. Dundee went on a 23 match undefeated streak avoiding relegating & ending the season in mid table (6th).

== Match results ==
=== Division summary ===
Round	1	2	3	4	5	6	7	8	9	10	11	12	13	14	15	16	17	18	19	20	21	22	23	24	25	26	27	28	29	30	31	32	33	34	35	36
Ground	H	A	H	H	A	H	A	H	A	H	A	H	A	A	H	H	H	A	H	A	H	A	A	H	A	A	H	A	H	H	A	H	A	A	H	A
Result	W	L	D	W	L	D	L	W	D	D	D	W	W	W	W	W	W	D	W	W	W	W	W	D	D	W	W	D	D	D	L	D	W	W	W	L
Position	3	5	6	3	5	7	7	6	5	4	4	10	10	10	10	10	10	10	10	9	7	7	7	7	7	7	6	6	7	7	7	7	7	7	5	6

Updated to match(es) played on 20 July 2011. Source: Statto.com
A = Away; H = Home; W = Win; D = Draw; L = Loss

=== Division table ===
Pos	Team	Pld	W	D	L	GF	GA	GD	Pts
4	Queen of the South	36	14	7	15	54	53	+1	49
5	Partick Thistle	36	12	11	13	44	39	+5	47
6	Dundee	36	19	12	5	54	34	+20	44 (Note: Dundee were docked 25 points for entering administration. The deduction was temporarily lifted pending an appeal by the club, however the appeal failed and the deduction was reinstated.)
7	Greenock Morton	36	11	10	15	39	43	−4	43
8	Ross County	36	9	14	13	30	34	−4	41

Source: SPFL
Rules for classification: 1) points; 2) goal difference; 3) number of goals scored.

=== Scottish First Division ===
Win Draw Loss

Fixture Date Week/Round	Home team	Score	Away team	Venue

7 August 2010 Week 1	Dundee	1–0	Queen of the South	Dens Park, Dundee
	Harkins 23' (yellow card) 82'; Riley (yellow card) 47' (yellow-red card) 74'; Sansara (yellow card) 61' (yellow-red card) 71'	BBC Sport	Robinson (yellow card) 87'	Attendance: 4,644; Referee: Stevie O'Reilly

14 August 2010 Week 2	Partick Thistle	1–0	Dundee	Firhill Stadium, Glasgow
	Rowson (yellow card) 14'; Boyle (yellow card) 45' (goal) 71'	BBC Sport	O'Donnell (yellow card) 43'; Shimmin (yellow card) 85'; Harkins (yellow card) 92'	Attendance: 2,801; Referee: Frank McDermott

21 August 2010 Week 3	Dundee	0–0	Ross County	Dens Park, Dundee
	Adams (yellow card) 19'	BBC Sport	Boyd (yellow card) 31'; Vigurs (yellow card) 79'	Attendance: 3,946; Referee: Craig Thomson

28 August 2010 Week 4	Dundee	2–0	Falkirk	Dens Park, Dundee
	Adams (yellow card) 34'; O'Donnell 43'; Riley 45'; Douglas (red card) 54'	BBC Sport	Marr (yellow card) 18'	Attendance: 4,557; Referee: William Collum

11 September 2010 Week 5	Dunfermline Athletic	3–1	Dundee	East End Park, Dunfermline
	Gibson 20' (pen.); Steven Bell 42'; Mason (yellow card) 59'; Clarke 78'	BBC Sport	Harkins 51'; O'Donnell (yellow card) 64'; Lockwood (yellow card) 90'	Attendance: 4,037; Referee: Steve Conroy

18 September 2010 Week 6	Dundee	0–0	Raith Rovers	Dens Park, Dundee
	Mišůn (yellow card) 34'; McKeown (yellow card) 73'	BBC Sport	Wilson (yellow card) 44'; Simmons (yellow card) 85'	Attendance: 4,532; Referee: David Somers

25 September 2010 Week 7	Cowdenbeath	2–1	Dundee	Central Park, Cowdenbeath
	Ramsay 12'; Winter (yellow card) 41'; Fairbairn 44'	BBC Sport	Griffiths 82'; O'Donnell (yellow card) 90'	Attendance: 1,154; Referee: Craig Charleston

2 October 2010 Week 8	Dundee	2–1	Greenock Morton	Dens Park, Dundee
	Irvine (yellow card) 13'; Lockwood 25' (pen.); McMenamin 57'	BBC Sport	Fitzharris (yellow card) 20'; Weatherson 41'	Attendance: 4,068; Referee: Euan Norris

16 October 2010 Week 9	Stirling Albion	1–1	Dundee	Forthbank Stadium, Stirling
	Corrigan (yellow card) 16'; Forsyth 70' (yellow card) 79'; Aitken (yellow card) 80'; Brown (red card) 84'	BBC Sport	Adams (yellow card) 41'; Griffiths 56' (yellow card) 79'; Weston (yellow card) 71'	Attendance: 1,578; Referee: Craig Thomson

23 October 2010 Week 10	Dundee	2–2	Dunfermline Athletic	Dens Park, Dundee
	Higgins (yellow card) 37' (goal) 81'; Griffiths 48'	BBC Sport	Gibson 30' (pen.), 33' (pen.); Clarke (yellow card) 79'; Dowie (yellow card) 87'; Bell (yellow card) 89'	Attendance: 5,636; Referee: Dougie McDonald

30 October 2010 Week 11	Falkirk	3–3	Dundee	Falkirk Stadium, Falkirk
	Stewart 72', 75'; Millar 88' (pen.)	BBC Sport	Griffiths 2' (yellow card) 85'; Higgins 7'; O'Donnell (yellow card) 40'; Witteveen 84'	Attendance: 4,667; Referee: Brian Winter

6 November 2010 Week 12	Dundee	2–1	Partick Thistle	Dens Park, Dundee
	Griffiths 14' (yellow card) 43'; Harkins (yellow card) 44'; Adams 86' (yellow card) 89'	BBC Sport	Kinniburgh (yellow card) 34'; Robertson (yellow card) 45'; Paton (yellow card) 55'; Hodge 57'	Attendance: 6,022; Referee: Charlie Richmond

13 November 2010 Week 13	Ross County	0–3	Dundee	Victoria Park, Dingwall
	Miller (yellow card) 14'; Craig (yellow card) 44'; Gardyne (yellow card) 66'; McCormack (yellow card) 71'; Lawson (yellow card) 81'	BBC Sport	Griffiths 18', 75'; Riley 51'; Higgins (yellow card) 71'	Attendance: 2,331; Referee: Stevie O'Reilly

11 December 2010 Week 14	Greenock Morton	0–1	Dundee	Cappielow Park, Greenock
	McCaffrey (yellow card) 81'; MacGregor (yellow card) 86'	BBC Sport	Riley (yellow card) 43'; McKeown (yellow card) 44'; Lockwood 62' (pen.); Griffiths (yellow card) 88'	Attendance: 1,568; Referee: Eddie Smith

14 December 2010 Week 15	Dundee	3–0	Cowdenbeath	Dens Park, Dundee
	Forsyth 37'; Riley 66'; McKeown 68'	BBC Sport		Attendance: 3,503; Referee: Steven McLean

18 December 2010 Week 16	Dundee	2–0	Stirling Albion	Dens Park, Dundee
	O'Donnell 36'; Griffiths 46'; Weston (yellow card) 79'	BBC Sport		Attendance: 3,842; Referee: Neil Watters

2 January 2011 Week 17	Dundee	2–0	Ross County	Dens Park, Dundee
	Lockwood 28' (pen.); Forsyth (yellow card) 50'; O'Donnell (yellow card) 63'; Weston (yellow card) 65'; Harkins 83'	BBC Sport	Kettlewell (yellow card) 64' (yellow-red card) 90'; Scott (yellow card) 65'; Lawson (yellow card) 65'; Craig (yellow card) 90'	Attendance: 4,725; Referee: Frank McDermott

15 January 2011 Week 18	Dunfermline Athletic	0–0	Dundee	East End Park, Dunfermline
		BBC Sport	Higgins (yellow card) 2' (yellow-red card) 47'; Harkins (yellow card) 54'; McKeown (yellow card) 58'; Benedictus (yellow card) 71'; O'Donnell (yellow card) 73'	Attendance: 3,385; Referee: Craig Charleston

22 January 2011 Week 19	Dundee	1–0	Falkirk	Dens Park, Dundee
	Forsyth 8'; Riley (yellow card) 29'	BBC Sport	O'Brien (yellow card) 24'; Finnigan (yellow card) 34' (yellow-red card) 68'; Millar (yellow card) 49'; Khalis (yellow card) 76'; McLean (yellow card) 80'	Attendance: 4,763; Referee: Crawford Allan

5 February 2011 Week 20	Queen of the South	1–2	Dundee	Palmerston Park, Dumfries
	Burns (yellow card) 56'; McGuffie 60'	BBC Sport	Forsyth 35'; Riley (yellow card) 59'; Greacen (yellow card) 76'; Higgins 77'	Attendance: 2,003; Referee: Stephen Finnie

12 February 2011 Week 21	Dundee	2–1	Raith Rovers	Dens Park, Dundee
	Higgins (yellow card) 65'; Harkins 84'; O'Donnell (yellow card) 86'; McCann 90+5'	BBC Sport	Murray 51' (yellow card) 83'; Dyer (yellow card) 72'; Davidson (yellow card) 78'; Simmons (yellow card) 81'	Attendance: 5,105; Referee: George Salmond

19 February 2011 Week 22	Stirling Albion	0–1	Dundee	Forthbank Stadium, Stirling
	Borris (yellow card) 45'; Forsyth (yellow card) 72'; Doyle (yellow card) 74'; Buist (yellow card) 82'	BBC Sport	McKeown (yellow card) 17'; Higgins 35'; Weston (yellow card) 41'; Irvine (red card) 64'; Douglas (yellow card) 75'	Attendance: 1,190; Referee: Brian Winter

22 February 2011 Week 23	Raith Rovers	1–2	Dundee	Stark's Park, Kirkcaldy
	Davidson (yellow card) 41'; Walker 50'; Campbell (yellow card) 53'; Tadé (yellow card) 61'	BBC Sport	O'Donnell (yellow card) 28'; Higgins 34', 54' (yellow card) 55'; McKeown (yellow card) 47'; Weston (yellow card) 60'	Attendance: 2,716; Referee: Iain Brines

26 February 2011 Week 24	Dundee	1–1	Greenock Morton	Dens Park, Dundee
	Higgins 26'; Harkins (yellow card) 61'	BBC Sport	Evans (yellow card) 37'; MacGregor (yellow card) 46'; McCaffrey (yellow card) 59'; Jenkins (yellow card) 72' (goal) 76'	Attendance: 4,769; Referee: William Collum

5 March 2011 Week 25	Partick Thistle	0–0	Dundee	Firhill Stadium, Glasgow
		BBC Sport	Irvine (yellow card) 87'	Attendance: 2,671; Referee: Bobby Madden

8 March 2011 Week 26	Cowdenbeath	1–3	Dundee	Central Park, Cowdenbeath
	Malcolm (yellow card) 52'; Stewart 55'	BBC Sport	Higgins 23'; Lockwood 48' (pen.); Forsyth 85'	Attendance: 977; Referee: Brian Colvin

12 March 2011 Week 27	Dundee	2–1	Queen of the South	Dens Park, Dundee
	Higgins 65'; Forsyth 87'	BBC Sport	McMenamin 34'; Weatherston (yellow card) 52'; McKenna (yellow card) 56'	Attendance: 4,242; Referee: Craig Thomson

19 March 2011 Week 28	Falkirk	2–2	Dundee	Falkirk Stadium, Falkirk
	McManus 27'; Scobbie (yellow card) 55'; Stewart 64'; Finnigan (yellow card) 69'	BBC Sport	Riley (yellow card) 36'; Benedictus (yellow card) 38'; Forsyth (yellow card) 52' (goal) 81'; Irvine 65'; Douglas (yellow card) 70'	Attendance: 4,099; Referee: William Collum

22 March 2011 Week 29	Dundee	1–1	Dunfermline Athletic	Dens Park, Dundee
	Weston (yellow card) 53'; Hyde 71'; Irvine (yellow card) 73'	BBC Sport	Hardie (yellow card) 29'; Burke 32'	Attendance: 4,507; Referee: Mike Tumilty

26 March 2011 Week 30	Dundee	2–2	Cowdenbeath	Dens Park, Dundee
	Hyde 24', 73'; Lockwood (yellow card) 62'; McKeown (yellow card) 82'	BBC Sport	Crawford 9'; Linton 57'; Coult (yellow card) 90'	Attendance: 4,311; Referee: Stephen Finnie

2 April 2011 Week 31	Raith Rovers	2–1	Dundee	Stark's Park, Kirkcaldy
	Tadé 43'; Davidson (yellow card) 46'; Walker 90'	BBC Sport	McKeown (yellow card) 43' (yellow-red card) 84'; O'Donnell 71' (yellow card) 89'	Attendance: 3,143; Referee: Craig Charleston

10 April 2011 Week 32	Dundee	1–1	Stirling Albion	Dens Park, Dundee
	O'Donnell (yellow card) 43'; McIntosh 50'	BBC Sport	Mullen 23'; Robertson (yellow card) 90'	Attendance: 4,177; Referee: Gary Hilland

16 April 2011 Week 33	Greenock Morton	1–3	Dundee	Cappielow Park, Greenock
	O'Brien (yellow card) 36' (goal) 66'	BBC Sport	McIntosh 6', 75'; Harkins 42'	Attendance: 2,069; Referee: Kevin Clancy

23 April 2011 Week 34	Ross County	0–1	Dundee	Victoria Park, Dingwall
		BBC Sport	McIntosh 65'	Attendance: 3,205; Referee: Anthony Law

30 April 2011 Week 35	Dundee	3–2	Partick Thistle	Dens Park, Dundee
	Forsyth 59', 62'; Lockwood 71' (pen.)	BBC Sport	Stewart 68'; Kinniburgh (red card) 70'; Doolan 90'; Lochhead (yellow card) 90'	Attendance: 7,746; Referee: Bobby Madden

7 May 2011 Week 36	Queen of the South	3–0	Dundee	Palmerston Park, Dumfries
	Johnston 18'; McMenamin 24'; Burns 61'	BBC Sport		Attendance: 2,590; Referee: Alan Muir

=== Scottish Cup ===
9 January 2011 Scottish Cup round 4	Dundee	0–4	Motherwell	Dens Park, Dundee
	Higgins (yellow card) 66'; Harkins (yellow card) 68'; Griffiths (red card) 89'	BBC Sport	Sutton 3', 47'; Randolph (yellow card) 67'; Jennings (yellow card) 67' (goal) 81'; Murphy 87'	Attendance: 4,285; Referee: Steve Conroy

=== Scottish League Cup ===
31 July 2010 Co-Operative Insurance Cup round 1	Dundee	3–0	Montrose	Dens Park, Dundee
	Forsyth (yellow card) 22'; Riley 33', 79'; Adams (yellow card) 52'; Griffiths (yellow card) 57' (goal) 70' (pen.)	BBC Sport		Attendance: 2,111; Referee: Matt Northcroft

24 August 2010 Co-Operative Insurance Cup round 2	Brechin City	2–2 (a.e.t.)	Dundee	Glebe Park, Brechin
	McLean (yellow card) 31' (yellow-red card) 57'; McAllister 63', 64'; King (yellow card) 75'; Molloy (yellow card) 89' McAllister (penalty scored); Booth (penalty scored); Docherty (penalty missed); Byers (penalty scored)	BBC Sport	Weston (yellow card) 42'; Adams (yellow card) 45'; Griffiths (yellow card) 66' (goal) 71', 74'; McKeown (yellow card) 99'; Forsyth (red card) 120' Harkins (penalty scored); Paton (penalty missed); O'Donnell (penalty missed); Riley (penalty missed)	Attendance: 1,090; Referee: Stephen Finnie

=== Scottish Challenge Cup ===
24 July 2010 ALBA Challenge Cup round 1 N&E	Dundee	2–1	Alloa Athletic	Dens Park, Dundee
	Antoine-Curier (yellow card) 58'; McMenamin 86'; Higgins 90'; Gary Irvine (yellow card) 90'	BBC Sport	Grant (yellow card) 37'; Brown (yellow card) 63'; Walker 74'	Attendance: 1,522; Referee: Euan Norris

10 August 2010 ALBA Challenge Cup round 2	Stenhousemuir	4–1	Dundee	Ochilview Park, Stenhousemuir
	Williams 9'; Anderson 16'; Fusco (yellow card) 20'; Quinn 63'; Motion 83'	BBC Sport	Griffiths 74'	Attendance: 665; Referee: Iain Brines

== Squad ==
Key: = Appearances, = Goals, = Yellow card, (red card) = Red card

Position	Nation	Name	League				Scottish Cup				League Cup				Challenge				Total			
Position	Nation	Name		Goal	Booked	Sent off (straight red)		Goal	Booked	Sent off (straight red)		Goal	Booked	Sent off (straight red)		Goal	Booked	Sent off (straight red)		Goal	Booked	Sent off (straight red)
GK	(Scotland)	Robert Douglas	34	0	2	1	1	0	0	0	2	0	0	0	0	0	0	0	37	0	2	1
GK	(Scotland)	John Gibson	1	0	0	0	0	0	0	0	0	0	0	0	0	0	0	0	1	0	0	0
GK	(Scotland)	Scott Fox	1+1	0	0	0	0	0	0	0	0	0	0	0	2	0	0	0	3+1	0	0	0
GK	(United States)	Dominic Cervi	0	0	0	0	0	0	0	0	0	0	0	0	0	0	0	0	0	0	0	0
GK	(Scotland)	Scott Findlay	0	0	0	0	0	0	0	0	0	0	0	0	0	0	0	0	0	0	0	0
GK	(Scotland)	Bobby Geddes	0	0	0	0	0	0	0	0	0	0	0	0	0	0	0	0	0	0	0	0
DF	(England)	Dominic Shimmin	1	0	1	0	0	0	0	0	0	0	0	0	0	0	0	0	1	0	1	0
DF	(Scotland)	Gary Irvine	31	1	3	1	1	0	0	0	2	0	0	0	2	0	1	0	36	1	4	1
DF	(Scotland)	Craig McKeown	34	1	8	1	1	0	0	0	1	0	1	0	2	0	0	0	38	1	9	1
DF	(Scotland)	Eric Paton	3+1	0	0	0	0+2	0	0	0	0	0	0	0	0+1	0	0	0	3+4	0	0	0
DF	(Scotland)	Stewart Greacen	0+1	0	1	0	0	0	0	0	0	0	0	0	0	0	0	0	0+1	0	1	0
DF	(Czech Republic)	Milan Mišůn	2	0	1	0	0	0	0	0	0	0	0	0	0	0	0	0	2	0	1	0
DF	(Wales)	Rhys Weston	29+1	0	6	0	1	0	0	0	2	0	1	0	1	0	0	0	33+1	0	7	0
DF	(England)	Netan Sansara	1	0	2	1	0	0	0	0	0	0	0	0	1	0	0	0	2	0	2	1
DF	(England)	Matthew Lockwood	33	5	2	0	1	0	0	0	1	0	0	0	0	0	0	0	35	5	2	0
DF	(Scotland)	Kyle Benedictus	10	0	2	0	0+1	0	0	0	0	0	0	0	1	0	0	0	11+1	0	2	0
DF	(Scotland)	Connor Rennie	4+2	0	0	0	0	0	0	0	0	0	0	0	0	0	0	0	4+2	0	0	0
DF	(Scotland)	Michael Hutcheon	0	0	0	0	0	0	0	0	0	0	0	0	0	0	0	0	0	0	0	0
DF	(Scotland)	Barry Smith	0	0	0	0	0	0	0	0	0	0	0	0	0	0	0	0	0	0	0	0
MF	(Scotland)	Neil McCann	2+1	1	0	0	0	0	0	0	0	0	0	0	0	0	0	0	2+1	1	0	0
MF	(Scotland)	Brian Kerr	2	0	0	0	0	0	0	0	0	0	0	0	1	0	0	0	3	0	0	0
MF	(Scotland)	Steven Robb	1	0	0	0	0	0	0	0	0	0	0	0	0	0	0	0	1	0	0	0
MF	(Scotland)	Jamie Adams	11	1	4	0	0	0	0	0	1	0	2	0	0	0	0	0	12	1	6	0
MF	(Scotland)	Gary Harkins	36	5	4	0	1	0	1	0	2	0	0	0	2	0	0	0	41	5	4	0
MF	(Scotland)	Jonny Stewart	4+6	0	0	0	1	0	0	0	0	0	0	0	0	0	0	0	5+6	0	0	0
MF	(Scotland)	Stephen O'Donnell	31+2	3	10	0	1	0	0	0	1+1	0	0	0	1+1	0	0	0	34+4	3	10	0
MF	(Scotland)	Nicky Riley	32+1	3	6	1	0	0	0	0	1+1	2	0	0	2	0	0	0	35+2	5	6	1
MF	(Scotland)	Craig Forsyth	26+7	8	2	0	1	0	0	0	2	0	1	1	2	0	0	0	31+7	8	3	1
MF	(Scotland)	Paul McHale	1+1	0	0	0	0	0	0	0	0+1	0	0	0	1+1	0	0	0	2+3	0	0	0
MF	(Scotland)	Charlie Grant	2	0	0	0	0	0	0	0	1	0	0	0	0	0	0	0	3	0	0	0
MF	(Scotland)	Ross Carnegie	0	0	0	0	0	0	0	0	0	0	0	0	0	0	0	0	0	0	0	0
MF	(Scotland)	Graham Webster	2+1	0	0	0	0	0	0	0	0	0	0	0	0	0	0	0	2+1	0	0	0
MF	(Scotland)	Gary Bartlett	2	0	0	0	0	0	0	0	0	0	0	0	0	0	0	0	2	0	0	0
FW	(Scotland)	Graham Bayne	1+1	0	0	0	0	0	0	0	0	0	0	0	0	0	0	0	1+1	0	0	0
FW	(Finland)	Njazi Kuqi	3	0	0	0	0	0	0	0	0	0	0	0	0	0	0	0	3	0	0	0
FW	(Scotland)	Colin McMenamin	3+5	1	0	0	0	0	0	0	2	0	0	0	0+2	1	0	0	5+7	2	0	0
FW	(Austria)	David Witteveen	2+3	1	0	0	0	0	0	0	0	0	0	0	0	0	0	0	2+3	1	0	0
FW	(England)	Jake Hyde	2	3	0	0	0	0	0	0	0	0	0	0	0	0	0	0	2	3	0	0
FW	(Scotland)	Leigh Griffiths	18	8	4	0	1	0	0	1	2	3	2	0	2	1	0	0	23	12	6	1
FW	(Scotland)	Sean Higgins	19+7	9	6	1	1	0	1	0	0+1	0	0	0	1+1	1	0	0	21+9	10	7	1
FW	(Scotland)	Tom Brighton	3	0	0	0	0	0	0	0	0	0	0	0	0	0	0	0	3	0	0	0
FW	(Scotland)	Craig Robertson	2+1	0	0	0	0	0	0	0	0	0	0	0	0	0	0	0	2+1	0	0	0
FW	(Scotland)	Leighton McIntosh	7+5	4	0	0	0	0	0	0	0	0	0	0	0	0	0	0	7+5	4	0	0
FW	(Scotland)	Alan Tulleth	0+3	0	0	0	0	0	0	0	0	0	0	0	0	0	0	0	0+3	0	0	0
FW	(Scotland)	Gary Irons	0	0	0	0	0	0	0	0	0	0	0	0	0	0	0	0	0	0	0	0
FW	(Guadeloupe)	Mickaël Antoine-Curier	0	0	0	0	0	0	0	0	0	0	0	0	1	0	1	0	1	0	1	0

Players with a zero in every column only appeared as unused substitutes

== Records ==
=== Top goalscorers ===
Position	Nation	Name	League	Cups	Total
1	(Scotland)	Leigh Griffiths	8	4	12
2	(Scotland)	Sean Higgins	9	1	10
3	(Scotland)	Craig Forsyth	8	0	8

=== Disciplinary record ===
Position	Nation	Name	Yellow	Red	Total
1	(Scotland)	Craig McKeown	9	1	10
=	(Scotland)	Steve O'Donnell	10	0	10
3	(Scotland)	Sean Higgins	7	1	8

== Transfers ==
=== Transfers Summer ===
==== Players in ====
Player	From	Fee
(England) Dominic Shimmin	(Scotland) Greenock Morton	Free
(Scotland) Scott Fox	(Scotland) Queen of the South	Free
(Scotland) Nicky Riley	(Scotland) Hamilton Academical	Free
(Scotland) Stephen O'Donnell	(Scotland) St Mirren	Free
(Scotland) Gary Irvine	(Scotland) St Johnstone	Free
(Scotland) Jamie Adams	(Scotland) St Johnstone	Loan
(England) Netan Sansara	(England) Walsall	Free
(Austria) David Witteveen	(Scotland) Heart of Midlothian	Loan
(Finland) Njazi Kuqi	(England) Stevenage Borough	Free

==== Players out ====
Player	To	Fee
(England) Tony Bullock	(Scotland) Livingston	Free
(Scotland) Gary MacKenzie	(England) MK Dons	Free
(Scotland) Derek Soutar	(Cyprus) APEP Pitsilia	Free
(Scotland) Richie Hart	(Sweden) Östersunds FK	Loan
(Scotland) Colin Cameron	(Scotland) Cowdenbeath	Free
(Scotland) Pat Clarke	(Scotland) Dunfermline Athletic	Undisclosed
(Slovakia) Maroš Klimpl	(Czech Republic) Viktoria Žižkov	Free
(Scotland) Eddie Malone	(Scotland) Ayr United	Free
(Scotland) Darren Young	(Scotland) Greenock Morton	Free
(Scotland) Connor Rennie	(Scotland) Deveronvale	Loan
(England) David Cowan	Free agent	Free
(Scotland) Robert Malcolm	Free agent	Free
(Scotland) Jim Lauchlan	(Republic of Ireland) Sligo Rovers	Free
(Northern Ireland) Chris Casement	(Northern Ireland) Linfield	Free
(Scotland) Bryan Deasley	(Scotland) Forfar Athletic	Free

=== Transfers Mid Window ===
==== Players in ====
Player	From	Fee
(Czech Republic) Milan Mišůn	(Scotland) Celtic	Loan
(United States) Dominic Cervi	(Scotland) Celtic	Loan

==== Players out ====
Player	To	Fee
(Scotland) Scott Fox	(Scotland) Partick Thistle	Free
(Scotland) Colin McMenamin	(Scotland) Queen of the South	Free
(Scotland) Charlie Grant	(Scotland) East Stirlingshire	Free
(Scotland) Brian Kerr	Free agent	Free
(Scotland) Eric Paton	(Scotland) Stenhousemuir	Free
(Scotland) Paul McHale	(Scotland) Stirling Albion	Free

=== Transfers Winter ===
==== Players in ====
Players	Why	Source
None	Transfer Embargo	

==== Players out ====
Player	To	Fee
(Guadeloupe) Mickaël Antoine-Curier	(Scotland) Hamilton Academical	Free
(Scotland) Leigh Griffiths	(England) Wolverhampton Wanderers	£150k
(Scotland) Kyle Benedictus	(Scotland) Montrose	Loan
(England) Dominic Shimmin	(England) Dover Athletic	Free
(Finland) Njazi Kuqi	(Finland) TPS Turku	Free

== See also ==
- List of Dundee F.C. seasons
