= 2012–13 Dundee F.C. season =

Dundee
2012–13 season
- Manager: Barry Smith (until 20 February); John Brown (from 23 February)
- Stadium: Dens Park
- Premier League: 12th (relegated)
- League Cup: Second round
- Scottish Cup: Quarter-final
- Top goalscorer: League: Ryan Conroy (6); All: Ryan Conroy (7)
- Highest home attendance: 11,419 vs. Dundee United, SPL, 9 December 2012
- Lowest home attendance: 3,336 vs. Greenock Morton, Scottish Cup, 3 February 2013
- Average home league attendance: 5,943
Home colours	Away colours	Third colours

The 2012–13 season was Dundee's first season back in the Scottish Premier League. Dundee also competed in the League Cup and the Scottish Cup. Dundee were due to compete in their eighth consecutive season in the Scottish First Division, having been relegated from the Scottish Premier League in 2005. On 16 July 2012, Dundee were invited to join to the SPL to fill the vacancy left by Rangers. Their membership was officially confirmed on 3 August, only one day before the season started.

== Summary ==
=== Season ===
Dundee finished twelfth in the Scottish Premier League, and were relegated to the Scottish First Division. They reached the second round of the League Cup and the Quarter-final of the Scottish Cup.

=== Management ===
Dundee began the season under the management of Barry Smith. On 20 February 2013, Smith left the club following a twelve-game winless streak and with the side sitting bottom of the Scottish Premier League. Smith's assistant Ray Farningham took over training. On 23 February, John Brown was appointed as interim manager until the end of the season, with the appointment being made permanent on a two-year deal in April.

== Results and fixtures ==
Win Draw Loss Postponed

=== Preseason ===
A match between Dundee and Bristol City scheduled for 30 July, was cancelled due to the late scheduling of the League Cup causing a clash.

7 July 2012 Friendly	Lancaster City	1–2	Dundee	Giant Axe
15:00	Clark	Dundee Report; Daily Record Report	Marshall (Own goal); O'Donnell

11 July 2012 Friendly	Kendal Town	0–2	Dundee	Parkside
19:45		Report	McIntosh

14 July 2012 Friendly	Dundee	0–3	Dundee United	Dens Park
15:00		Report; Daily Record Report	Daly 2', 84', 86'	Attendance: 10,121

21 July 2012 Friendly	Cove Rangers	1–5	Dundee	Allan Park
	Leydon 49'	Report	Baird 22', 90'; Webster 30'; Conroy 75'; Riley 77'

=== Scottish Premier League ===
4 August 2012	Kilmarnock	0–0	Dundee	Rugby Park
15:00		BBC Report		Attendance: 6,523; Referee: Madden

11 August 2012	Dundee	0–2	St Mirren	Dens Park
15:00		BBC Report	McLean 39'; Parkin 63'	Attendance: 5,984; Referee: Allan

19 August 2012	Dundee United	3–0	Dundee	Tannadice Park
15:00	Gunning 14'; Russell 35', 38'; Russell (red card) 72'	BBC Report	O'Donnell (red card) 72'	Attendance: 13,538; Referee: Murray

25 August 2012	Dundee	0–1	Ross County	Dens Park
15:00		BBC Report	Brittain 72' (pen.)	Attendance: 4,905; Referee: McLean

2 September 2012	Heart of Midlothian	0–1	Dundee	Tynecastle Stadium
15:00		BBC Report	Conroy 3' (pen.)	Attendance: 12,446; Referee: Thomson

15 September 2012	Dundee	1–2	Motherwell	Dens Park
15:00	Nish 20'	BBC Report	Higdon 74', 85'	Attendance: 5,176; Referee: Clancy

22 September 2012	Celtic	2–0	Dundee	Celtic Park
15:00	Hooper 43'; Wanyama 49'	BBC Report		Attendance: 41,073; Referee: Beaton

29 September 2012	Dundee	1–3	St Johnstone	Dens Park
15:00	Conroy 22' (Penalty)	BBC Report	Tade 16'; Craig 27'; MacLean 52'	Attendance: 6,158; Referee: Muir

6 October 2012	Hibernian	3–0	Dundee	Easter Road
15:00	Doyle 29'; Griffiths 51' (pen.); Wotherspoon 74'	BBC Report		Attendance: 10,163; Referee: Collum

19 October 2012	Dundee	1–4	Inverness Caledonian Thistle	Dens Park
19:45	Nish 13'	BBC Report	McKay 4', 85'; Warren 7'; Shinnie 81' (pen.)	Attendance: 5,006; Referee: Thomson

27 October 2012	Aberdeen	2–0	Dundee	Pittodrie Stadium
15:00	McGinn 14'; Hayes 74'	BBC Report		Attendance: 10,425; Referee: Murray

3 November 2012	Dundee	1–0	Heart of Midlothian	Dens Park
15:00	Lockwood 22'	BBC Report		Attendance: 5,344; Referee: McLean

10 November 2012	Motherwell	1–1	Dundee	Fir Park
15:00	Higdon 45+1'	BBC Report	Riley 28'	Attendance: 4,318; Referee: Beaton

17 November 2012	Dundee	3–1	Hibernian	Dens Park
15:00	Benedictus 21'; Milne 47'; McBride 52' (Penalty)	BBC Report	Griffiths 90'	Attendance: 6,743; Referee: Colvin

24 November 2012	St Mirren	3–1	Dundee	St Mirren Park
15:00	Thompson 31', 72'; Imrie 87'	BBC Report	Nish (red card) 27'; Conroy 64' (Penalty)	Attendance: 4,825; Referee: Collum

9 December 2012	Dundee	0–3	Dundee United	Dens Park
12:45		Sky Report	Watson 17'; Daly 71' (pen.); Flood 88'	Attendance: 11,419; Referee: Collum

15 December 2012	Ross County	1–1	Dundee	Victoria Park
15:00	Glen 74'	BBC Report	Davidson 37'	Attendance: 3,129; Referee: Muir

22 December 2012	Inverness Caledonian Thistle	4–1	Dundee	Caledonian Stadium
15:00	McKay 12' (Penalty), 48'; Tudur Jones 24'; Shinnie 70'	BBC Report	Riley 19'	Attendance: 3,003; Referee: Clancy

26 December 2012	Dundee	0–2	Celtic	Dens Park
19:30	Samaras 16'; Hooper 71'	BBC Report		Attendance: 9,276; Referee: Brines

29 December 2012	Dundee	1–3	Aberdeen	Dens Park
15:00	Stewart 82'	BBC Report	McGinn 46', 69', 89'	Attendance: 9,013; Referee: Colvin

2 January 2013	St Johnstone	1–0	Dundee	McDiarmid Park
14:00	Craig 33'	BBC Report		Attendance: 5,055; Referee: McKendrick

19 January 2013	Hibernian	1–1	Dundee	Easter Road
15:00	Griffiths 49'	BBC Report	Baird 8'	Attendance: 10,386; Referee: Charleston

27 January 2013	Dundee	0–0	Kilmarnock	Dens Park
15:00		BBC Report		Attendance: 4,782; Referee: Beaton

30 January 2013	Heart of Midlothian	1–0	Dundee	Tynecastle Stadium
19:45	Sutton 86'	BBC Report		Attendance: 11,284; Referee: Allan

8 February 2013	Dundee	0–2	Ross County	Dens Park
19:45		BBC Report	Lawson 80'; Glen 90+3'	Attendance: 4,726; Referee: McKendrick

15 February 2013	Aberdeen	1–0	Dundee	Pittodrie Stadium
19:45	McGinn 18'	BBC Report		Attendance: 7,841; Referee: Colvin

23 February 2013	Celtic	5–0	Dundee	Celtic Park
12:45	Ledley 13', 72'; Forrest 50' (pen.); McGeouch 57'; Hooper 83'	BBC Report	Lockwood (red card) 49'	Attendance: 39,959; Referee: Clancy

27 February 2013	Dundee	2–2	St Johnstone	Dens Park
19:45	Baird 42'; Gallagher (red card) 66'; Stewart 89'	BBC Report	MacLean 36'; MacKay 68'	Attendance: 5,224; Referee: Collum

6 March 2013	Dundee	2–1	St Mirren	Dens Park
19:45	Baird 68'; McAlister 78'	BBC Report	Imrie 20'	Attendance: 3,674; Referee: Finnie

9 March 2013	Dundee	1–1	Inverness Caledonian Thistle	Dens Park
15:00	Baird 13'	BBC Report	McKay 83'	Attendance: 4,114; Referee: Thomson

17 March 2013	Dundee United	1–1	Dundee	Tannadice Park
12:00	Gardyne 89'	BBC Report	Irvine (red card) 21'; Conroy 67'	Attendance: 10,731; Referee: Madden

30 March 2013	Dundee	0–3	Motherwell	Dens Park
15:00		BBC Report	Higdon 9'; Law 63', 79'	Attendance: 4,838; Referee: McLean

6 April 2013	Kilmarnock	1–2	Dundee	Rugby Park
15:00	Boyd 74'	BBC Report	Harkins 6', 77'	Attendance: 4,966; Referee: Brines

20 April 2013	St Mirren	1–2	Dundee	St Mirren Park
15:00	Thompson 52'; Goodwin (yellow card) 65' (yellow-red card)	BBC Report	McAlister 40'; Finnigan 81'	Attendance: 4,002; Referee: Thomson

27 April 2013	Dundee	1–0	Heart of Midlothian	Dens Park
15:00	Conroy 82'; Riley (red card) 89'	BBC Report	Webster (yellow card) 28' (yellow-red card)	Attendance: 5,896; Referee: Beaton

5 May 2013	Dundee	1–1	Aberdeen	Dens Park
15:00	McAlister 20'	BBC Report	McGinn 70' (Penalty); Fallon (red card) 62'	Attendance: 6,441; Referee: Muir

11 May 2013	Dundee	2–3	Kilmarnock	Dens Park
15:00	Conroy 19'; Stewart 83'	BBC Report	McKenzie 4'; Johnston 58'; Clingan 73'	Attendance: 4,190; Referee: Norris

18 May 2013	Hibernian	1–0	Dundee	Easter Road
15:00	Wotherspoon 79'	BBC Report		Attendance: 9,522; Referee: Colvin

=== Scottish League Cup ===
31 July 2012 First round	Peterhead	0–0 (a.e.t.) (1–4 p)	Dundee	Balmoor
19:45		SFL Report		Attendance: 844; Referee: Brines
	Penalties
	McAllister (penalty scored); MacDonald (penalty missed); McLaughlin (penalty missed)		McBride (penalty scored); Baird (penalty scored); Irvine (penalty scored); Conroy (penalty scored)

29 August 2012 Second round	Queen's Park	2–1	Dundee	Hampden Park
19:45	Longworth 24' (Penalty kick); Burns 76'	BBC Report	Milne 5'; McGregor (red card) 24'	Attendance: 707; Referee: Colvin

=== Scottish Cup ===
1 December 2012 Fourth round	Livingston	0–2	Dundee	Almondvale Stadium
15:00		BBC Report	Milne 9'; Conroy 17' (pen.)	Attendance: 1,432; Referee: Allan

3 February 2013 Fifth round	Dundee	5–1	Greenock Morton	Dens Park
15:00	McAlister 29'; Toshney 65'; Nish 71'; Baird 74'; Gallagher 82'	BBC Report	Tidser 31'	Attendance: 3,336; Referee: Madden

3 March 2013 Quarter-final	Dundee	1–2	Dundee United	Dens Park
12:45	McAlister 19'	BBC Report	McLean 11'; Mackay-Steven 35'	Attendance: 10,191; Referee: Brines

== Player statistics ==
=== Captains ===
No.	P	Name	Country	No. games	Notes
4	MF	O'Donnell	(Scotland)	7	Club captain
2	DF	Irvine	(Scotland)	31	Vice-captain

Last updated: 18 May 2013
Source: Competitive match reports.
Competitive matches only
Matches started as captain only
Country: FIFA nationality; No.: Squad number; P: Position; Name: Player name; No. Games: Number of games started as captain.

=== Squad ===
This section includes all players who have been listed as part of the first team during the season. They may not have made an appearance.

Last updated 18 May 2013

No.	Pos	Nat	Player	Total		Premier League		League Cup		Scottish Cup	
No.	Pos	Nat	Player	Apps	Goals	Apps	Goals	Apps	Goals	Apps	Goals
1	GK	(Scotland) SCO	Rab Douglas	35	0	30+0	0	2+0	0	3+0	0
2	DF	(Scotland) SCO	Gary Irvine	39	0	34+0	0	2+0	0	3+0	0
3	DF	(England) ENG	Matt Lockwood	26	1	21+2	1	2+0	0	1+0	0
4	MF	(Scotland) SCO	Stephen O'Donnell	7	0	6+0	0	0+1	0	0+0	0
5	DF	(Scotland) SCO	Neil McGregor	7	0	5+0	0	2+0	0	0+0	0
6	MF	(Scotland) SCO	Iain Davidson	40	1	35+1	1	1+0	0	3+0	0
7	MF	(Scotland) SCO	Nicky Riley	29	2	19+8	2	0+0	0	2+0	0
8	MF	(Scotland) SCO	Kevin McBride	26	1	20+3	1	1+0	0	2+0	0
9	FW	(England) ENG	Carl Finnigan	7	1	1+6	1	0+0	0	0+0	0
10	FW	(Scotland) SCO	John Baird	42	5	29+8	4	2+0	0	3+0	1
11	DF	(Scotland) SCO	Ryan Conroy	37	7	20+12	6	2+0	0	2+1	1
12	GK	(Scotland) SCO	John Gibson	0	0	0+0	0	0+0	0	0+0	0
14	FW	(Scotland) SCO	Leighton Mcintosh	2	0	0+1	0	1+0	0	0+0	0
15	FW	(Scotland) SCO	Steven Milne	18	3	11+3	1	1+0	1	2+1	1
16	MF	(Scotland) SCO	Graham Webster	5	0	0+3	0	2+0	0	0+0	0
17	DF	(Scotland) SCO	Kyle Benedictus	28	1	24+2	1	1+0	0	1+0	0
18	DF	(Scotland) SCO	Declan Gallagher	28	1	24+0	0	1+1	0	2+0	1
19	MF	(Scotland) SCO	Jamie McCluskey	0	0	0+0	0	0+0	0	0+0	0
20	MF	(Scotland) SCO	Jim McAlister	42	5	38+0	3	1+0	0	3+0	2
21	DF	(Italy) ITA	Davide Grassi	13	0	10+1	0	1+0	0	1+0	0
22	MF	(Northern Ireland) NIR	David Morgan	1	0	0+1	0	0+0	0	0+0	0
23	FW	(Scotland) SCO	Martin Boyle	10	0	1+8	0	0+0	0	0+1	0
24	FW	(Scotland) SCO	Colin Nish	26	3	21+3	2	0+0	0	1+1	1
25	DF	(Scotland) SCO	Lewis Toshney	26	1	20+3	0	0+0	0	2+1	1
26	DF	(Scotland) SCO	Brian Easton	19	0	17+0	0	0+0	0	2+0	0
27	FW	(Scotland) SCO	Mark Stewart	17	3	5+10	3	0+0	0	0+2	0
28	MF	(Scotland) SCO	Mark Kerr	8	0	6+2	0	0+0	0	0+0	0
29	MF	(Scotland) SCO	Gary Harkins	14	2	14+0	2	0+0	0	0+0	0
31	MF	(Scotland) SCO	Rori Bews	0	0	0+0	0	0+0	0	0+0	0
32	DF	(Scotland) SCO	James Thomson	1	0	0+1	0	0+0	0	0+0	0
33	MF	(Scotland) SCO	Jamie Reid	1	0	0+0	0	0+1	0	0+0	0
34	MF	(Scotland) SCO	Greg Birmingham	0	0	0+0	0	0+0	0	0+0	0
36	GK	(Australia) AUS	Alex Baird	0	0	0+0	0	0+0	0	0+0	0
37	MF	(Scotland) SCO	Danny Cavanagh	0	0	0+0	0	0+0	0	0+0	0
45	GK	(England) ENG	Steve Simonsen	8	0	8+0	0	0+0	0	0+0	0
46	FW	(Ireland) EIR	Don Cowan	1	0	0+1	0	0+0	0	0+0	0
47	FW	(Scotland) SCO	Andrew Barrowman	1	0	0+1	0	0+0	0	0+0	0

=== Disciplinary record ===
Includes all competitive matches.

Last updated 18 May 2013

Number	Nation	Position	Name	Premier League		League Cup		Scottish Cup		Total	
Number	Nation	Position	Name	Yellow card	Red card	Yellow card	Red card	Yellow card	Red card	Yellow card	Red card
1	(Scotland)	GK	Rab Douglas	1	0	0	0	0	0	1	0
2	(Scotland)	DF	Gary Irvine	6	1	1	0	1	0	8	1
3	(England)	DF	Matt Lockwood	2	1	0	0	0	0	2	1
4	(Scotland)	MF	Stephen O'Donnell	2	1	0	0	0	0	2	1
5	(Scotland)	DF	Neil McGregor	0	0	0	1	0	0	0	1
6	(Scotland)	MF	Iain Davidson	10	0	0	0	0	0	10	0
7	(Scotland)	MF	Nicky Riley	3	1	0	0	1	0	4	1
8	(Scotland)	MF	Kevin McBride	2	0	0	0	0	0	2	0
9	(England)	FW	Carl Finnigan	0	0	0	0	0	0	0	0
10	(Scotland)	FW	John Baird	3	0	1	0	0	0	4	0
11	(Scotland)	DF	Ryan Conroy	2	0	0	0	0	0	2	0
12	(Scotland)	GK	John Gibson	0	0	0	0	0	0	0	0
14	(Scotland)	FW	Leighton Mcintosh	0	0	0	0	0	0	0	0
15	(Scotland)	FW	Steven Milne	0	0	0	0	0	0	0	0
16	(Scotland)	MF	Graham Webster	0	0	0	0	0	0	0	0
17	(Scotland)	DF	Kyle Benedictus	7	0	1	0	0	0	8	0
18	(Scotland)	DF	Declan Gallagher	4	1	0	0	0	0	4	1
19	(Scotland)	MF	Jamie McCluskey	0	0	0	0	0	0	0	0
20	(Scotland)	MF	Jim McAlister	4	0	0	0	0	0	4	0
21	(Italy)	DF	Davide Grassi	0	0	1	0	1	0	2	0
22	(Northern Ireland)	MF	David Morgan	0	0	0	0	0	0	0	0
23	(Scotland)	FW	Martin Boyle	0	0	0	0	0	0	0	0
24	(Scotland)	FW	Colin Nish	2	1	0	0	0	0	2	1
25	(Scotland)	DF	Lewis Toshney	1	0	0	0	0	0	1	0
26	(Scotland)	DF	Brian Easton	2	0	0	0	0	0	2	0
27	(Scotland)	FW	Mark Stewart	0	0	0	0	0	0	0	0
28	(Scotland)	MF	Mark Kerr	0	0	0	0	0	0	0	0
29	(Scotland)	MF	Gary Harkins	2	0	0	0	0	0	2	0
31	(Scotland)	MF	Rori Bews	0	0	0	0	0	0	0	0
32	(Scotland)	DF	James Thomson	1	0	0	0	0	0	1	0
33	(Scotland)	MF	Jamie Reid	0	0	0	0	0	0	0	0
34	(Scotland)	MF	Greg Birmingham	0	0	0	0	0	0	0	0
36	(Australia)	GK	Alex Baird	0	0	0	0	0	0	0	0
37	(Scotland)	MF	Danny Cavanagh	0	0	0	0	0	0	0	0
45	(England)	GK	Steve Simonsen	0	0	0	0	0	0	0	0
46	(Republic of Ireland)	FW	Don Cowan	0	0	0	0	0	0	0	0
47	(Scotland)	FW	Andrew Barrowman	1	0	0	0	0	0	1	0

== Team statistics ==
=== League table ===
Pos	Team	Pld	W	D	L	GF	GA	GD	Pts	Qualification or relegation
8	Aberdeen	38	11	15	12	41	43	−2	48 (Note: Teams in the bottom half at the time of the split may not overtake a team in the top 6 at the time of the split.)	
9	Kilmarnock	38	11	12	15	52	53	−1	45	
10	Heart of Midlothian	38	11	11	16	40	49	−9	44	
11	St Mirren	38	9	14	15	47	60	−13	41	
12	Dundee (R)	38	7	9	22	28	66	−38	30	Relegation to the Championship

Source: SPFL Archive
Rules for classification: 1) points; 2) goal difference; 3) number of goals scored.
(R) Relegated

=== Division summary ===
Round	1	2	3	4	5	6	7	8	9	10	11	12	13	14	15	16	17	18	19	20	21	22	23	24	25	26	27	28	29	30	31	32	33	34	35	36	37	38
Ground	A	H	A	H	A	H	A	H	A	H	A	H	A	H	A	H	A	A	H	H	A	A	H	A	H	A	A	H	H	H	A	H	A	A	H	H	H	A
Result	D	L	L	L	W	L	L	L	L	L	L	W	D	W	L	L	D	L	L	L	L	D	D	L	L	L	L	D	W	D	D	L	W	W	W	D	L	L
Position	5	11	12	12	10	12	12	12	12	12	12	12	12	12	12	12	12	12	12	12	12	12	12	12	12	12	12	12	12	12	12	12	12	12	12	12	12	12

Updated to match(es) played on 18 May 2013. Source:
A = Away; H = Home; W = Win; D = Draw; L = Loss

== Transfers ==
=== Players in ===
Player	From	Fee
(Scotland) John Baird	(Scotland) Raith Rovers	Free
(England) Carl Finnigan	(Scotland) St Johnstone	Free
(Scotland) Declan Gallagher	(Scotland) Clyde	Undisclosed
(Scotland) Iain Davidson	(Scotland) Raith Rovers	Free
(Scotland) Mark Stewart	(England) Bradford City	Free
(Italy) Davide Grassi	(Belgium) Brussels	Free
(Scotland) Jim McAlister	(Scotland) Hamilton Academical	Free
(Scotland) Martin Boyle	(Scotland) Montrose	Undisclosed
(Scotland) Colin Nish	(England) Hartlepool United	Loan
(Scotland) Lewis Toshney	(Scotland) Celtic	Loan
(Australia) Alex Baird	(England) Newcastle United	Free
(Scotland) Brian Easton	(England) Burnley	Free
(Scotland) Mark Kerr	(Scotland) Dunfermline Athletic	Free
(Scotland) Gary Harkins	(Scotland) Kilmarnock	Undisclosed
(Northern Ireland) David Morgan	(England) Nottingham Forest	Loan
(England) Steve Simonsen	(England) Preston North End	Free
(Republic of Ireland) Don Cowan	(England) Stevenage	Free
(Scotland) Andrew Barrowman	(Scotland) Dunfermline Athletic	Free

=== Players out ===
Player	To	Fee
(Scotland) Graham Bayne	(Scotland) Wick Academy (Note: Initially announced decision to retire but later that season joined Wick Academy.)	Free
(Scotland) Ross Chisholm	(Bulgaria) PFC Shumen 2010	Free
(Scotland) Mark Fotheringham	(Scotland) Ross County	Free
(England) Jake Hyde	(England) Barnet	Free
(Scotland) Craig McKeown	(Scotland) Formartine United	Free
(Scotland) John Gibson	(Scotland) Elgin City	Loan
(Scotland) Leighton Mcintosh	(Scotland) Montrose	Loan
(Scotland) Scott Fowlie	(Scotland) Fraserburgh	Free
(Scotland) Jamie Reid	(Scotland) Stenhousemuir	Loan
(Scotland) Martin Boyle	(Scotland) Montrose	Loan
(Scotland) John Gibson	(Scotland) Montrose	Loan
(Scotland) Neil McGregor	(Scotland) Ayr United	Loan

== See also ==
- List of Dundee F.C. seasons
