= Ryan Conroy =

Scottish footballer

Personal information
- Date of birth: 28 April 1987 (age 39)
- Place of birth: Vale of Leven, Scotland
- Height: 1.78 m (5 ft 10 in)
- Position: Winger

Senior career*
Years	Team	Apps	(Gls)
2005–2011	Celtic	2	(0)
2010	→ Partick Thistle (loan)	15	(0)
2010	→ Queen of the South (loan)	11	(3)
2011–2014	Dundee	100	(24)
2014–2015	Raith Rovers	35	(6)
2015–2016	Queen of the South	28	(0)
2016–2019	Airdrieonians	85	(12)
2019–2022	Peterhead	52	(3)
2022–2023	Broomhill	29	(3)

International career
2007	Scotland U20	5	(0)
2008	Scotland U21	3	(1)
- * Club domestic league appearances and goals

Ryan Conroy (born 28 April 1987) is a Scottish former professional footballer who played as a left-winger. He could also play as a left-back. Conroy has played for Celtic, Queen of the South, Partick Thistle on loan, Dundee, Raith Rovers, Airdrieonians, Peterhead and Broomhill.

== Club career ==
=== Celtic ===
Conroy was born in Vale of Leven, Scotland. He consistently impressed throughout his time with the Celtic youth system and ahead of the 2005–06 season, he signed his first professional contract. In 2007, Manager Gordon Strachan considered calling up Conroy into the first team as cover.

He made his first team debut on 11 December 2007, during Celtic's 4–0 defeat of Falkirk, playing at left back. After making his debut, Conroy said he hoped he could earn himself a longer-term deal with Celtic.

On 6 July 2009, Conroy signed a new deal with Celtic for another year. The arrival of the returning Charlie Mulgrew led Conroy to state that he thought Mulgrew's arrival would not affect his chance of making a breakthrough at Celtic.

==== Partick Thistle (loan) ====
Conroy was loaned to Partick Thistle for whom he played 15 games, all in the league, in the second half of the 2009–10 season. He returned to Celtic when the deal had expired on 5 May 2010.

==== Queen of the South (loan) ====
On 28 August 2010, Conroy joined Dumfries club Queen of the South on loan, scoring on his debut in the league game against Ross County on the same day. This was the first goal of his senior career.

He became the fourth of the 2006 Scotland under-19 squad to play for the Palmerston Park club after Jamie Adams, Brian Gilmour and Scott Fox.

His second goal for QoS was away in the league against top of the table opposition. Scoring from 18 yards after a Derek Holmes flick on, this was the only goal in the 1–0 win against Raith Rovers on 6 November 2010. He scored again the following week, hitting QoS' second goal (again from 18 yards) after a Derek Holmes knock down in the 3–0 home win against Cowdenbeath at Palmerston.

Conroy returned to Celtic after the weather ruined three chances to play a final game at Palmerston. Conroy said, "I must say that I've really enjoyed those few months I've spent with Queen of the South. They're a good club and treat their players well. The fans have also been most supportive and I really appreciate that too. I would have liked to have stayed longer but the terms of the loan deal didn't allow that. I've really enjoyed my spell at Palmerston and wish the club all the best for the future."

Following the end of his loan at Queen of the South, Conroy was linked with a move to Ross County.

=== Dundee ===
After his contract with Celtic expired at the end of the 2010–11 season, Conroy left Celtic to join Dundee. After the move, Conroy said he wanted to achieve promotion with the club to the Scottish Premier League and show Celtic manager Neil Lennon he made a mistake letting him leave the club.

Conroy made his debut for the club, in the first round of the Scottish Challenge Cup against Arbroath, where he provided a cross for Stephen O'Donnell, in the 92nd minute, as Dundee won 2–1 in extra time. Conroy made his league debut in the club's opening match of the season, in a 1–0 win over against Partick Thistle. Having made eleven appearances, he scored his first goal for the club, on 5 November 2011, in a 1–0 win over Raith Rovers and scored again in the next match, which turned out to be the winning goal and he also provided an assist for Gavin Rae, in a 2–1 win over Morton. Later in the 2011–12 season, Conroy would add nine more goals to his total, including a brace against Morton in a 2–0 win on 17 March 2012. He went on to make forty-two appearances in all competitions, scoring twelve times and during the season, Conroy reverted from playing at left-back to either left-wing or left-midfield.

In the 2012–13 season, Dundee were promoted to the Scottish Premier League to replace Rangers who went into liquidation and had to re-apply and start again in the Third Division. Conroy scored his and Dundee's first goal of the season, with the winning goal from a penalty, in a 1–0 victory against Hearts, giving the club their first win of the season on 2 September 2012. Four weeks later, on 29 September 2012, he scored again, from the penalty spot, in a 3–1 loss against St Johnstone. Then, on 17 March 2013, Conroy scored as Dundee drew 1–1 against Dundee United in the Dundee derby. Manager John Brown commented about Conroy, saying: "Ryan is a really talented lad, If van Persie had hit the kind of goal he got in the derby then we would all have been raving about it. It was such a good strike and it showed what Ryan has to offer when he is in that kind of form. He just needs to believe in himself more and once he has that confidence he can do even greater things. Not many people have the sort of left foot he has. Ryan can make things happens and I have asked him to do that." During the 2012–13 season, he made thirty-eight appearances in all competitions, scoring seven times, making him Dundee's top scorer for the season, however, the club was relegated after a draw with Aberdeen.

Ahead of the 2013–14 season, Conroy signed a new deal with the club. He scored seven goals as Dundee won promotion to the Scottish Premiership by winning the 2013–14 Scottish Championship, but he was released by the club in June 2014, having been among players expected to leave in the summer.

=== Raith Rovers ===
On 10 July 2014, Conroy signed with Raith Rovers. At the time of his release from Dundee, Raith Rovers confirmed their interest in signing Conroy.

He scored on his debut, against Forfar Athletic on 2 August 2014, in a 4–2 win in the Scottish Challenge Cup. His first league goal came seven days later on 9 August 2014, in the opening game of the season, in a 3–1 win over Dumbarton, followed up his second goal, in a 1–0 win over Alloa Athletic in his second appearance. Following his good display, Manager Grant Murray believed Conroy could be a key player for the club.

=== Queen of the South (Second spell) ===
On 28 May 2015 it was announced that Conroy had signed for Queen of the South. He scored on his second debut for the club against Stranraer in the Challenge Cup, and followed that up with another goal on his second appearance against Annan Athletic in the Scottish League Cup.

=== Airdrieonians ===
Conroy joined Scottish League One side Airdrieonians in July 2016, signing a two-year deal with the club. At the end of the 2018–19 season, he was among a group of players made available for transfer by the club, and on 3 July 2019, he left Airdrieonians after agreeing a mutual termination of his contract. Following his departure, Conroy criticised the club for making the list of available players public.

=== Peterhead ===
In August 2019, Conroy signed for Peterhead until the end of the season.

== Career statistics ==
As of 13 November 2021

Club	Season	League			Cup		League Cup		Other^{[A]}		Total	
Club	Season	Division	Apps	Goals	Apps	Goals	Apps	Goals	Apps	Goals	Apps	Goals
Celtic	2005–06	Scottish Premier League	0	0	0	0	0	0	0	0	0	0
Celtic	2006–07	Scottish Premier League	0	0	0	0	0	0	0	0	0	0
Celtic	2007–08	Scottish Premier League	2	0	0	0	0	0	0	0	2	0
Celtic	2008–09	Scottish Premier League	0	0	1	0	0	0	0	0	1	0
Celtic	2009–10	Scottish Premier League	0	0	0	0	0	0	0	0	0	0
Celtic	2010–11	Scottish Premier League	0	0	0	0	0	0	0	0	0	0
Celtic	Total		2	0	1	0	0	0	0	0	3	0
Partick Thistle (loan)	2009–10	Scottish First Division	15	0	0	0	0	0	0	0	15	0
Queen of the South (loan)	2010–11	Scottish First Division	11	3	0	0	1	0	2 (Note: Appearances in the Scottish Challenge Cup)	0	14	3
Dundee	2011–12	Scottish First Division	35	11	3	1	2	0	2	0	42	12
Dundee	2012–13	Scottish Premier League	33	6	3	1	2	0	0	0	38	7
Dundee	2013–14	Scottish Championship	32	7	1	0	2	0	3	0	38	7
Dundee	Total		100	24	7	2	6	0	5	0	118	26
Raith Rovers	2014–15	Scottish Championship	35	6	4	2	2	1	1	0	42	9
Queen of the South	2015–16	Scottish Championship	28	0	0	0	2	1	2	1	32	2
Airdrieonians	2016–17	Scottish League One	34	3	1	0	3	0	4 (Note: Two appearances in the Scottish Challenge Cup and two appearances and one goal in the Scottish Championship play-offs)	1	42	4
Airdrieonians	2017–18	Scottish League One	23	6	1	0	4	0	1	0	29	6
Airdrieonians	2018–19	Scottish League One	28	3	0	0	4	1	2	1	34	5
Airdrieonians	Total		85	12	2	0	11	1	7	2	105	15
Peterhead	2019–20	Scottish League One	22	2	1	0	0	0	1	0	24	2
Peterhead	2020–21	Scottish League One	15	0	1	0	4	0	0	0	20	0
Peterhead	2021–22	Scottish League One	11	1	0	0	4	0	2	0	17	1
Peterhead	Total		48	3	2	0	8	0	3	0	61	3
Career total			324	48	16	4	30	3	20	3	390	58

== International career ==
Conroy was part of the Scotland under 19 squad that made it to the final of the 2006 European Championships played in Poland. Conroy played in the last four of Scotland's five games and scored the opener in the group phase win against Turkey. He was also included in the Scotland under–20 squad that played in the 2007 FIFA U-20 World Cup.

== Honours ==
Dundee

- Scottish Championship: 2013–14
