= Nicky Riley =

Scottish footballer

Personal information
- Date of birth: 10 May 1986 (age 40)
- Place of birth: Edinburgh, Scotland
- Position: Midfielder

Youth career
- Celtic

Senior career*
| Years | Team | Apps | (Gls) |
| 2002–2010 | Celtic | 0 | (0) |
| 2010 | Hamilton Academical | 0 | (0) |
| 2010–2014 | Dundee | 113 | (9) |
| 2014 | → Peterhead (loan) | 3 | (0) |
| 2015–2019 | Peterhead | 79 | (5) |
| 2022–2023 | Linlithgow Rose | | |
- * Club domestic league appearances and goals

Nicky Riley (born 10 May 1986) is a professional Scottish footballer. He began his career at Celtic and then played for Hamilton Academical and Dundee, spending time on loan at Peterhead while with Dundee then ended his time with Linlithgow Rose.

== Career ==
Riley signed for Celtic after spending time with the Brazilian Soccer School in Edinburgh. Upon signing for the club he was involved with their under-21 side.

After suffering with injuries throughout his time at Celtic, he was released in January 2010, having never played in a competitive match for the club.

After leaving Celtic, Riley trained with Hamilton Academical and on 19 February 2010, signed a contract until the end of the season. He left Hamilton at the end of the season, again without making an appearance.

Riley then joined Dundee for pre season training and after two weeks at the club signed an initial six-month contract on 16 July 2010. In October 2010, Dundee entered administration, but Riley was one of the players kept by the club and in December 2010, extended his contract until the end of the season.

In the 2011–12 season Riley was named as Scottish Football League Player of the Month for November 2011, and at the end of the season was voted into the PFA Scotland First Division Team of the Year. On 22 May 2012, he signed a new one-year contract.

At the end of the 2013–14 season, with Dundee having won the Scottish Championship title and promotion to the Scottish Premiership, Riley was one of a number of players reported to have been told by manager Paul Hartley that they could leave the club. In September 2014, Ayr United manager Mark Roberts said that he was interested in signing Riley, with Hartley saying that Riley needed to go somewhere and play first team football.

On 3 October 2014, Riley signed for Peterhead on a one-month loan. After his loan had come to an end, he left Dundee by mutual consent on 4 November 2014.

On 9 January 2015, Riley returned to Peterhead, signing until the end of the 2014–15 season.

Riley last played for Linlithgow Rose in 2022.

== Career statistics ==
As of match played 28 October 2017

Appearances and goals by club, season and competition
| Club | Season | League | | | Scottish Cup | | League Cup | | Other | | Total | |
| Club | Season | Division | Apps | Goals | Apps | Goals | Apps | Goals | Apps | Goals | Apps | Goals |
|---|---|---|---|---|---|---|---|---|---|---|---|---|
| Dundee | 2010–11 | First Division | 33 | 3 | 0 | 0 | 1 | 0 | 0 | 0 | 34 | 3 |
| Dundee | 2011–12 | First Division | 25 | 4 | 0 | 0 | 2 | 0 | 0 | 0 | 27 | 4 |
| Dundee | 2012–13 | Premier League | 28 | 2 | 2 | 0 | 0 | 0 | – | | 30 | 2 |
| Dundee | 2013–14 | Championship | 27 | 0 | 1 | 0 | 1 | 0 | 1 (Note: Appearances in the Scottish Challenge Cup) | 0 | 30 | 0 |
| Dundee | Dundee total | | 113 | 9 | 3 | 0 | 4 | 0 | 1 | 0 | 121 | 9 |
| Peterhead (loan) | 2014–15 | League One | 19 | 1 | 1 | 0 | 0 | 0 | 0 | 0 | 20 | 1 |
| Peterhead | 2015–16 | League One | 30 | 1 | 1 | 0 | 0 | 0 | 5 (Note: Three appearances in the Scottish Challenge Cup and two in the Championship play-offs) | 0 | 36 | 1 |
| Peterhead | 2016–17 | League One | 32 | 4 | 1 | 0 | 4 | 0 | 5 (Note: Two appearances in the Scottish Challenge Cup and three in the League One play-offs) | 0 | 42 | 4 |
| Peterhead | 2017–18 | League Two | 6 | 0 | 1 | 0 | 0 | 0 | 1 | 0 | 8 | 0 |
| Peterhead | Peterhead total | | 68 | 5 | 3 | 0 | 4 | 0 | 11 | 0 | 86 | 5 |
| Career total | | | 200 | 14 | 7 | 0 | 8 | 0 | 12 | 0 | 227 | 14 |

He has hair that can come in useful because it keeps his head warm in the winter
