= Netan Sansara =

English footballer

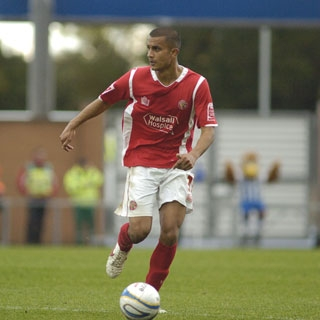
- Sansara playing for Walsall

Personal information
- Full name: Netan Nico Sansara
- Date of birth: 3 August 1989 (age 37)
- Place of birth: Darlaston, England
- Height: 6 ft 0 in (1.83 m)
- Position: Centre back

Team information
- Current team: Råde

Senior career*
Years	Team	Apps	(Gls)
2008–2010	Walsall	27	(0)
2010	Dundee	1	(0)
2010	AFC Telford United	0	(0)
2010–2011	Corby Town	25	(1)
2011–2012	PAEEK FC	26	(0)
2012–2013	FC Vestsjælland	2	(0)
2013–2014	Boston United	16	(1)
2014–2016	Fredrikstad	53	(4)
2017–2018	FC Edmonton	14	(0)
2018–2019	Gefle	23	(0)
2019–2020	Hødd	36	(4)
2021–	Råde		

International career
2007	England U18	1	(0)
- * Club domestic league appearances and goals as of 17 December 2020 2020

Netan Nico Sansara (born 3 August 1989) is an English footballer who plays as a defender for Råde.

He has previously played for Walsall, Dundee, AFC Telford United, Corby Town, PAEEK FC, FC Vestsjælland, Fredrikstad and FC Edmonton.

== Early life ==
Sansara was born in Darlaston, West Midlands. His parents were born in Britain and are of Indian descent. He grew up there, playing for his local team Darlaston Town. As a child he attended Pinfold Street Primary School and Darlaston Community Science College School; he played for all school football teams. He also represented his county, the Staffordshire district. During his time in the Walsall youth team Sansara completed A-levels in Psychology, Physical Education and Biology.

== Club career ==
=== Walsall ===
Sansara made his Walsall debut on 9 August 2008 in the League One game with Yeovil Town which ended in a 1–1 draw. Having come through the youth ranks at Walsall, he was handed a professional contract at the age of 17, by then Walsall manager Richard Money, after impressing him during youth team and reserve team games. Sansara made his professional debut the following season by newly appointed Walsall manager Jimmy Mullen against Yeovil Town. He said, "I thought he did well. But he's played well against Aston Villa and Wolves in pre-season, as well as other teams when Boertien wasn't available. I've given him his debut and he'll look back when he's 35 and say 'Jimmy Mullen gave me an opportunity'. He might even thank me one day! But I thought he was excellent – very good."

At the start of the 2009–10 season, Sansara was handed the squad number three, by manager Chris Hutchings. However, during a pre-season friendly in July 2010 against Wolverhampton Wanderers, Sansara's progress was halted due to an ankle ligament injury sustained in a tackle with Greg Halford. He made a return to action for his first start away at Colchester United in October 2009. The Saddlers lost 2–1.

Sansara went on to make another 19 appearances during the 2009–10 season.

=== Dundee, AFC Telford and Corby ===
The start of August 2010, saw Sansara make five appearances for Dundee in the Scottish First Division. Following his release by Dundee in October he joined Grimsby Town on trial but failed to earn a deal and joined AFC Telford United on a non-contract basis deal. He left the club without making an appearance and finished the season with Corby Town.

=== PAEEK ===
In July 2011, it had been announced that Sansara had signed for Cypriot side PAEEK FC. It had been revealed that Sansara had also received other offers during the summer but was to have been quoted stating he thought this move was the best for the development of his career.

On 17 September 2011, in the opening game of the season, Sansara made his debut for PAEEK FC. He completed the full 90 minutes in a 1–0 win over Ethnikos Assia.

In December 2011 it was announced that Sansara was offered a new deal by PAEEK FC after a string of impressive displays in defence for the Cypriot side.

Sansara helped PAEEK FC to finish in fourth place. He made 26 appearances out of 27, missing only one game through suspension after picking up five bookings. His performances for PAEEK FC saw him shortlisted for the Player of the Year award at the inaugural Asian Football Awards, which took place at Wembley Stadium in January 2012. Sansara was offered a new contract in Dec 2011 and was said to be considering his options at the end of the 2011–12 campaign.

=== FC Vestsjælland ===
In July 2012 it was announced that Sansara had joined Danish First Division club FC Vestsjælland after rejecting a new two-year contract offered by former Cypriot club PAEEK. Sansara signed a one-year deal with the Danish club. On 8 August, Sansara made his FC Vestsjælland debut against Hobro IK, playing the full 90 minutes. The game ended in a 1–1 draw.

=== Boston United ===
In June 2013 Sansara turned down the chance to return to FC Vestsjælland after helping them win promotion to the Danish superliga. In July 2013 Sansara joined Conference North side Boston United.

=== Stourbridge FC ===
In January 2014 Sansara joined Calor League Southern Premier Division club Stourbridge FC despite impressing he left the club for personal reasons in June 2014

=== Fredrikstad ===
In July 2014 Sansara again made the move abroad this time to Norwegian first division club Fredrikstad. Sansara made his debut in the club's first game back after the summer break playing the full 90 minutes against Bryne FK.

On 8 September 2014, Sansara signed a new two-year deal with the Norwegian club until 2016. The defender impressed immensely in his first eight games for the club, he scored three times.

On 27 February 2015 it was announced that Sansara was made first team captain of Fredrikstad for the coming season.

=== FC Edmonton ===
On 9 February 2017, Sansara joined with North American Soccer League side FC Edmonton.

=== Gefle IF ===
On 26 January 2018, Sansara joined Swedish second-tier side Gefle.

=== IL Hødd ===
On 13 February 2019, Sansara joined 2. divisjon side Hødd on a two-year deal. After the 2019 season Sansara was named in the 2. divisjon team of the year, voted as one of the best players in the league that season. Ahead of the 2021 season Sansara signed for 4. divisjon club Råde IL, also being employed in the club with marketing, events and coach development.

== International career ==
Sansara was called up by the England national under-18 team in March 2007, for their match with the Netherlands.

== Personal life ==
Sansara worked with the Professional Footballers' Association (PFA) to try to increase the number of British Asians taking up a career in professional football, and has attended meetings with the PFA to achieve this goal.

He is also an ambassador for Kick It Out (Lets Kick Racism Out of Football), when appointed Sansara was quoted "I have been working closely with the Kick It Out campaign for a while now, and I look forward to continuing to assist the work. I hope to act as a role model to the next generation of young British Asian talent."

In January 2012, Sansara was nominated for the Asian player of the year award 2012 at the Asian Football Awards. The event held at Wembley stadium and supported by Kick It Out (Lets Kick Racism Out of Football) and The Football Association. He was nominated alongside players such as Zesh Rehman and Michael Chopra.

In May 2013, Sansara was crowned the British Indian Awards sports personality of the year after a season with Danish team FC Vestsjælland. Sansara beat England cricketers Ravi Bopara and Monty Panesar to the award.

== Career statistics ==
As of match played 22 May 2016.

Appearances and goals by club, season and competition
Club	Season	League			National Cup		League Cup		Other		Total	
Club	Season	Division	Apps	Goals	Apps	Goals	Apps	Goals	Apps	Goals	Apps	Goals
Walsall	2008–09	League One	10	0	0	0	1	0	0	0	11	0
Walsall	2009–10	League One	17	0	2	0	0	0	0	0	19	0
Walsall	Total		27	0	2	0	1	0	0	0	30	0
Dundee	2010–11	Scottish First Division	1	0	—		0	0	0	0	1	0
Corby Town	2010–11	Conference North	25	1	—		—		—		25	1
FC Vestsjælland	2012–13	Danish 1st Division	2	0			—		—		2	0
Boston United	2013–14	Conference North	16	1	2	0	—		1 (Note: Appearance in FA Trophy)	0	19	1
Fredrikstad	2014	Norwegian First Division	15	3			—		—		15	3
Fredrikstad	2015	OBOS-ligaen	29	1			—		—		29	1
Fredrikstad	2016	OBOS-ligaen	9	0	2	0	—		—		11	0
Fredrikstad	Total		53	4	2	0	—		—		55	4
Career total			124	6	6	0	1	0	1	0	132	6

== Honours ==
Vestsjælland

- Danish 1st Division runner-up (promotion): 2012–13
