= Graham Webster (footballer) =

Scottish footballer

Personal information
- Full name: Graham Webster
- Date of birth: 10 December 1992 (age 33)
- Place of birth: Carnoustie, Scotland
- Position: Midfielder

Team information
- Current team: Montrose
- Number: 7

Senior career*
Years	Team	Apps	(Gls)
2011–2013	Dundee	6	(0)
2012	→ Peterhead (loan)	7	(1)
2013–	Montrose	355	(72)
- * Club domestic league appearances and goals as of 4 May 2026

Graham Webster (born 10 December 1992) is a Scottish football midfielder who plays for Scottish League One club Montrose.

== Career ==
=== Dundee ===
A member of the Dundee under-19 squad and with Dundee in administration and relying on youth Webster made his first team debut on 10 April 2011 against Stirling Albion from the start. He made two further appearances that season one as a substitute and played the full 90 minutes on the closing day of the season. Webster signed a new one-year contract extension in May 2011.

== Career statistics ==
As of match played 30 December 2019

Appearances and goals by club, season and competition
Club	Season	League			Scottish Cup		League Cup		Other		Total	
Club	Season	Division	Apps	Goals	Apps	Goals	Apps	Goals	Apps	Goals	Apps	Goals
Dundee	2010–11	First Division	3	0	0	0	0	0	0	0	3	0
Dundee	2011–12	First Division	0	0	0	0	0	0	1 (Note: Appearances in the Scottish Challenge Cup)	0	1	0
Dundee	2012–13	Premier League	3	0	0	0	2	0	—		5	0
Dundee	Dundee total		6	0	0	0	2	0	1	0	9	0
Peterhead (loan)	2011–12	Third Division	7	1	0	0	0	0	0	0	7	1
Montrose	2013–14	League Two	30	4	2	0	2	0	1	0	35	4
Montrose	2014–15	League Two	16	3	2	0	0	0	1	0	19	3
Montrose	2015–16	League Two	32	10	2	0	1	0	0	0	35	10
Montrose	2016–17	League Two	32	2	2	0	3	0	4 (Note: Two appearances and a goal in the Scottish Challenge Cup; two appearances in the League One play-offs)	1	41	3
Montrose	2017–18	League Two	25	2	2	1	4	0	3	0	34	3
Montrose	2018–19	League One	25	4	1	0	1	0	2	0	29	4
Montrose	2019–20	League One	18	7	1	0	3	0	2	0	24	7
Montrose	Montrose total		178	32	12	1	14	0	13	1	217	34
Career total			191	33	12	1	16	0	14	1	233	35
