= Leighton McIntosh =

Scottish footballer

Personal information
- Date of birth: 11 February 1993 (age 33)
- Place of birth: Dundee, Scotland
- Height: 1.85 m (6 ft 1 in)
- Positions: Winger; forward

Team information
- Current team: Dumbarton
- Number: 15

Senior career*
Years	Team	Apps	(Gls)
2010–2014	Dundee	33	(5)
2012–2013	→ Montrose (loan)	29	(8)
2014	→ Arbroath (loan)	8	(2)
2014–2015	Montrose	12	(3)
2015–2017	Peterhead	58	(16)
2017	UMF Selfoss	5	(1)
2017–2018	Arbroath	21	(8)
2018–2019	Airdrieonians	34	(15)
2019–2020	Wrexham	8	(1)
2020	→ Blyth Spartans (loan)	3	(1)
2020–2023	Cove Rangers	79	(14)
2023–2024	Arbroath	33	(6)
2024–2025	Queen of the South	15	(1)
2025	Al Ahli	10	(1)
2025–	Dumbarton	50	(20)

International career
2011	Scotland U19	3	(1)
- * Club domestic league appearances and goals as of 20:20, 14 November 2026 (UTC)

Leighton McIntosh (born 11 February 1993) is a Scottish footballer who plays as a striker for Scottish League Two side Dumbarton.

He began his career at Dundee and during his time there scored some important goals to help them avoid relegation from the Scottish Championship during their administration troubles. He has also had spells at Airdrieonians, Montrose, Arbroath, Peterhead, Cove Rangers, UMF Selfoss in Iceland and Jordanian Pro League club Al Ahli.

== Career ==
=== Dundee ===
Promoted to the first team following Dundee going into administration and nine of their first team players being released. Mcintosh made his debut on 11 December 2010 as a substitute against Morton in the Scottish First Division. He made 12 appearances scoring 4 goals that season. His contribution to Dundee's relegation survival was recognised when he won Young Player of the Month award for April 2011. On 12 May 2011 he signed a new three-year contract for Dundee.

==== Montrose and Arbroath loans ====
McIntosh spent the 2012–13 season on loan at Montrose On 31 January 2014, he moved on loan to Arbroath. After Dundee secured promotion to the Scottish Premiership in May 2014 he was released by the club.

=== Montrose ===
McIntosh signed for Montrose in September 2014, on a short-term contract until January 2015. He made his debut on 21 September 2014, in Montrose's 1–0 win against Elgin City.

=== Peterhead ===
McIntosh signed for League 1 Peterhead on 24 July 2015 following an impressive trial. He has made an instant impact helping the team to an impressive 5–3 win over Falkirk in the Petrofac Cup and scoring the winner over Dunfermline in a potential title decider. On 14 November 2015 McIntosh scored the winner in a 2–1 victory over Queens Park to send Peterhead into their first senior cup final. On 21 November 2015 McIntosh scored his first senior hat-trick for Peterhead in a 7–0 win against Cowdenbeath.

McIntosh's prolific form in front of goal in November was rightfully rewarded by receiving the Ladbrokes League 1 Player of the Month award which is decided by votes from members of the Scottish media. McIntosh finished the 2015–16 season with 14 goals in 16 starts and was voted Peterhead's young player of the year in what was a successful campaign with Peterhead reaching their first professional cup final and reaching the league play-offs. He left the club at the end of the 2016–17 season following the club's relegation to Scottish League Two.

=== UMF Selfoss ===
On 2 August 2017, McIntosh signed for Icelandic club Selfoss.

=== Arbroath (second spell) ===
On his return to Scotland, McIntosh joined Scottish League One side Arbroath, scoring twice on his debut. After scoring the winner against promotion chasing Ayr United on 6 January 2018, and to take his Arbroath tally to 6 goals in 7 appearances, McIntosh was named in the SPFL Team of the Week. McIntosh was released by the club at the end of the 2017–18 season.

=== Airdrieonians ===
McIntosh signed for Scottish League One side Airdrieonians for the 2018 season and scored in their 3–0 victory at Berwick Rangers in the Scottish League Cup. After scoring a double in a 3–0 win against league champions Arbroath on 27 April 2019, and to take his Airdrie tally to 14 goals for the season, McIntosh was named in the SPFL Team of the Week. McIntosh scored a hat-trick in a 4–1 victory over Stranraer to finish as the club's top scorer for the 2018–2019 season with 17 goals. He left the club in May 2019.

=== Wrexham ===
On 31 May 2019, McIntosh signed for National League club Wrexham.

On 14 February 2020, McIntosh was loaned to National League North side Blyth Spartans.

Wrexham chose not to renew McIntosh's contract for the following season.

=== Cove Rangers ===
On 10 August 2020, McIntosh signed with newly promoted Scottish League One side Cove Rangers.

=== Arbroath (third spell) ===
On 22 May 2023, McIntosh would return to former club Arbroath on a one-year deal.

=== Queen of the South ===
On 5 June 2024, it was announced that McIntosh had signed a one-year deal with Queen of the South. McIntosh's departure from the club was announced on 31 January 2025.

=== Al Ahli SC ===
In February 2025, McIntosh signed for Jordanian Pro League club Al Ahli SC, making history as the first Scottish player to play in Jordan.

=== Dumbarton ===
McIntosh returned to Scottish football in the summer of 2025, joining Scottish League Two side Dumbarton. He scored his first goals for the club in a 4-2 victory against Annan Athletic a month after joining. McIntosh scored his 100th career goal while at the Sons, in a defeat to Clyde in November 2025. He was named in the PFA Scotland League Two Team of the Year and finished the season as the Sons' top scorer with 16 goals - all in the league - as well as being named as the Sons' Player of the Year. He signed a new one year deal with the club in May 2026, with an option for a second year.

== International career ==
McIntosh has represented the Scotland under-19 team.

== Career statistics ==
As of 20:20, 14 November 2026 (UTC)

Appearances and goals by club, season and competition
Club	Season	League			National Cup		League Cup		Other		Total	
Club	Season	Division	Apps	Goals	Apps	Goals	Apps	Goals	Apps	Goals	Apps	Goals
Dundee	2010–11	Scottish First Division	12	4	0	0	0	0	0	0	12	4
Dundee	2011–12	Scottish First Division	18	1	1	0	1	0	1	0	21	1
Dundee	2012–13	Scottish Premier League	1	0	0	0	1	0	0	0	2	0
Dundee	2013–14	Scottish Championship	2	0	0	0	0	0	0	0	2	0
Dundee	Total		33	5	1	0	2	0	1	0	37	5
Montrose (loan)	2012–13	Scottish Third Division	29	8	1	0	0	0	0	0	30	8
Arbroath (loan)	2013–14	Scottish League One	8	2	0	0	0	0	0	0	8	2
Montrose	2014–15	Scottish League Two	16	2	1	0	0	0	2	0	19	2
Peterhead	2015–16	Scottish League One	31	12	1	0	1	0	7	2	40	14
Peterhead	2016–17	Scottish League One	27	4	1	0	5	1	6	1	39	6
Peterhead	Total		58	16	2	0	6	1	13	3	79	20
UMF Selfoss	2017	1. deild karla	7	1	0	0	0	0	0	0	7	1
Arbroath	2017–18	Scottish League One	21	8	2	2	0	0	2	0	25	10
Airdrieonians	2018–19	Scottish League One	34	15	2	0	3	1	2	1	41	17
Wrexham	2019–20	National League	8	1	1	0	0	0	4	2	13	3
Blyth Spartans (loan)	2019–20	National League North	3	1	0	0	0	0	0	0	3	1
Cove Rangers	2020–21	Scottish League One	21	2	2	0	3	0	2	1	28	3
Cove Rangers	2021–22	Scottish League One	27	4	3	0	3	1	4	1	37	6
Cove Rangers	2022–23	Scottish Championship	31	8	2	1	4	0	1	0	38	9
Cove Rangers	Total		79	14	7	1	10	1	7	2	103	18
Arbroath	2023–24	Scottish Championship	33	5	0	0	4	1	2	0	39	6
Queen of the South	2024–25	Scottish League One	15	0	1	0	2	1	1	0	19	1
Al-Ahli	2024–25	Jordanian Pro League	10	1	1	0	0	0	0	0	11	1
Dumbarton	2025–26	Scottish League Two	36	16	2	0	4	0	5	0	47	16
Dumbarton	2026–27	Scottish League Two	14	4	1	1	4	3	5	1	24	9
Total			393	98	21	4	35	8	44	9	493	119
