= Paul Lawson (footballer) =

Scottish footballer and manager

Personal information
- Full name: Paul William Lawson
- Date of birth: 15 May 1984 (age 42)
- Place of birth: Aberdeen, Scotland
- Height: 5 ft 9 in (1.75 m)
- Position: Midfielder

Team information
- Current team: Banks o' Dee (co-manager)

Senior career*
| Years | Team | Apps | (Gls) |
| 2004–2007 | Celtic | 3 | (0) |
| 2006 | → St Johnstone (loan) | 8 | (1) |
| 2007 | → St Mirren (loan) | 4 | (0) |
| 2007–2013 | Ross County | 145 | (11) |
| 2013–2015 | Motherwell | 20 | (0) |
| 2015–2022 | Formartine United | 78 | (19) |

International career^{‡}
| 2004–2005 | Scotland U21 | 10 | (0) |

Managerial career
- 2017–2022: Formartine United
- 2023-: Banks o' Dee
- * Club domestic league appearances and goals as of 01:16, 1 July 2015 (UTC) ‡ National team caps and goals as of 30 October 2009

Paul William Lawson (born 15 May 1984) is a Scottish professional footballer and manager who plays (as a central midfielder) and previously managed Formartine United in the Highland Football League now a co-manager at Banks o' Dee along with Josh Winton. He has previously played for Celtic, St Johnstone, St Mirren, Ross County and Motherwell.

During his time in Dingwall, Lawson appeared in the 2010 Scottish Cup Final, won the 2011–12 Scottish First Division and helped the Staggies to a top-six finish in their first ever season in the 2012–13 SPL.

== Club career ==
=== Celtic ===
Born in Aberdeen, Scotland, Lawson began his career at Celtic and progressed through the youth system where he was captain of the reserves side. During 2005 and 2007, Lawson was called up to Celtic's first team under the management of Gordon Strachan. He later criticised Strachan's predecessor, Martin O’Neill for his commitment to the club's youth system and praised Strachan.

He made his debut for Celtic, coming on as a 59th-minute substitute, in a 4–0 win against Dunfermline Athletic on 28 August 2005. On 5 December 2005, Lawson signed a contract with the club, until 2008. He made two more appearances for the club between September and April, both as a substitute. On the last game of the season against Aberdeen, Lawson made his first start for Celtic, playing in the right–midfield position in a 2–2 draw. At the end of the 2005–06 season, he made four appearances in all competitions.

Lawson played two times at right-back for Celtic in pre-season of 2006–07 against teams such as Wisła Kraków and Manchester United. However, he appeared as an unused substitute in the first game of the season in the 4–1 defeat of Kilmarnock, which put them top of the league. Following his return from a loan spell at St Johnstone, Lawson appeared twice as an unused substitute in Celtic's matches against Kilmarnock on 2 January 2007 and Hearts on 14 January 2007.

==== Loan Spells from Celtic ====
Lawson spent the first half of the 2006–07 season on loan at Scottish First Division club St Johnstone. He made his debut for the club, coming on as an 88th-minute substitute, in a 3–0 win against Dundee United in the third round of the Scottish League Cup. Lawson made his league debut for St. Johnstone, in a 1–1 draw against Dundee on 30 September 2006. On 21 October 2006, he scored his first professional goal against Queen of the South. A month later against Ross County on 22 November 2006, Lawson received a straight red card for handball, in a 2–2 draw. After serving a one match suspension, he returned to the starting line–up, in a 2–0 loss against Gretna on 2 December 2006. In January 2007, Lawson returned to his parent club, where he made nine appearances and scoring once in all competitions.

On 1 February 2007, Lawson completed a second loan move, this time to St Mirren. On 20 February 2007, he made his debut for the club, starting a match, in a 0–0 draw against Motherwell. At the end of the 2006–07 season, Lawson made four appearances in all competitions.

=== Ross County ===
Lawson was released by Celtic in the summer of 2007, and he then signed for Ross County on 31 August 2007.

He made his debut in the second round of the Scottish Challenge Cup, in a 2–0 loss against St Johnstone. A weeks later, on 15 September 2007, he made his league debut in a 2–0 win over Raith Rovers. Since joining the club, Lawson became a first team regular for Ross County. However, in a match against Raith Rovers on 5 January 2008, he received a red card for stamping Ryan Borris, in a 1–0 win. A month later in February 2008, Lawson scored his first goal for the club, scoring from a "stunning strike", in a 3–2 win over Queen's Park. After the match, Lawson said he hadn't experienced scoring enough to know how to celebrate. For his performance, Lawson signed a contract extension with Ross County. On the last game of the season, he scored his second goal of the season, in a 4–0 win over Berwick Rangers, which saw the club promoted to the First Division after winning the Second Division. At the end of the 2007–08 season, Lawson made twenty–eight appearances and scoring two times in all competitions.

At the start of the 2008–09 season, Lawson continued to remain in the first team, playing in the midfield position. However, his second season at Ross County was frustrating due to his own injury concerns. He also faced uncertainties with his contract at the club was due to expire at the end of the season. At the end of the 2008–09 season, Lawson made twenty–four appearances in all competitions. Following this, he signed a one-year deal with the club in May 2009.

At the start of the 2009–10 season, Lawson scored his first goal of the season, in a 2–1 win against Greenock Morton in the first round of the Scottish Challenge Cup. He regained his form in the first team for Ross County, playing in the midfield position. On 24 October 2009, Lawson scored his second goal of the season, in a 2–2 draw against Partick Thistle. A month later on 28 November 2009, he scored his third goal of the season, in a 5–1 win against Berwick Rangers. On 12 December 2009, Lawson scored his fourth goal of the season, in a 3–3 draw against Dunfermline Athletic. Five days later on 17 December 2009, he signed a new two-year deal with the club, keeping him until 2011. A month later on 30 January 2010, Lawson scored the only goal of the game, in a 1–0 win against Dundee. For his performance, he was named Scottish First Division Player of the Month for January. Two weeks later on 13 February 2010, he scored his sixth goal of the season, in a 2–2 draw against Dunfermline Athletic. However, Lawson suffered an injury that saw him out for four matches. As the 2009–10 season progressed, he was in the squad throughout Ross County's campaign in the Scottish Cup with the club reaching the final after beating Celtic in the semi-final. A year later, Lawson said he felt he wasn't really involved in that match having only on as a substitute in the last minute. In the Scottish Cup Final, Lawson came on as a substitute for Steven Craig, in a 3–0 loss against Dundee United. At the end of the 2009–10 season, he went on to make forty–two appearances and scoring six times, his highest goal tally in a season.

At the start of the 2010–11 season, Lawson scored his first goal of the season, in a 2–1 win against Elgin City in the first round of the Scottish Challenge Cup. After serving a one match suspension, he returned to the starting line–up, in a 1–0 loss against Falkirk on 14 August 2010. Two weeks later on 25 August 2010 against St Mirren in the second round of the Scottish League Cup, Lawson helped Ross County beat his former club in the penalty shootout to advance to the next round after he successfully converted the shootout. A week later on 4 September 2010, Lawson then scored twice for Ross County, in a 2–0 win against Forfar Athletic in the quarterfinals of the Scottish Challenge Cup. In the semi–finals of the Scottish Challenge Cup against Partick Thistle, he was one of the players to have their penalty successfully converted, as the club won 4–3 in a shootout to reach the final. Lawson was in the squad when Ross County won 2–0 against Queen of the South to win the Challenge Cup. Five days later on 16 April 2011, he scored his fourth goal of the season, in a 1–1 draw against Partick Thistle. However, Lawson suffered an injury that saw him out for two matches. On 30 April 2011, he made his return from injury, starting a match, in a 1–0 win against Falkirk. At the end of the 2010–11 season, Lawson made thirty–four appearances and scoring four times in all competitions.

At the start of the 2011–12 season, Lawson continued to retain his first team place, playing in the midfield position. He then scored his first goal of the season, in a 4–0 win against Ayr United on 1 October 2011. On 31 March 2012, Lawson scored his second goal of the season, in a 1–1 draw against Raith Rovers. During the season, Ross County won the Scottish First Division by a record margin of 24 points and promotion to the Scottish Premier League for the first time in the club's history when he set up one of the goals, in a 5–1 win against Hamilton Academical on 28 April 2012. At the end of the 2011–12 season, Lawson made thirty–eight appearances and scoring two times in all competitions. Following this, he was offered a new deal to stay at Ross County for the next season. On 25 May 2012, Lawson signed a one-year deal with the club.

With the club playing in the Scottish Premier League, Lawson played his first match in the league, in a 0–0 against Motherwell in the opening game of the 2012–13 season. However, he suffered a hamstring injury that kept him out for two months. By November, Lawson made his return to training. On 22 December 2012, he made his return from injury, coming on as a 77th-minute substitute, in a 4–0 loss against Celtic. Following his return from injury, Lawson earned his first team place back, playing in the midfield position. On 8 February 2013, he scored his first goal of the season, in a 2–0 win against Dundee. A month later, on 16 March 2013, Lawson scored from a 30-yard strike, in a 2–1 loss against rivals, Inverness Caledonian Thistle. After the match, he stated scoring in the derby didn't count for anything in the end due to the defeat. Lawson then helped Ross County secured a top-six finish in their first ever season in the 2012–13 Scottish Premier League by beating Celtic 3–2 on 9 March 2013. On the last game of the season against Inverness Caledonian Thistle, he got the last laugh against their rivals by setting up the only goal of the season, but the win wasn't enough, due to their failure of securing a European place. At the end of the 2012–13 season, Lawson made twenty–three appearances and scoring two times in all competitions.

=== Motherwell ===
Lawson signed with Motherwell on 1 June 2013, at the end of his contract with Ross County.

He made his debut for the club, starting a match and played 80 minutes being substituted, in a 2–0 loss against Kuban Krasnodar in the first leg of the UEFA Europa League third round. Motherwell would be eliminated after Kuban Krasnodar proved to be too strong and failed to win either legs losing 2–0 and 1–0 respectively. Lawson made his debut for Motherwell, starting a match and played 75 minutes before being substituted, in a 1–0 win over Hibernian in the opening game of the season. However, his first season at the club didn't go well, due to playing less from the substitution bench and his own injury concern that kept him out for the remainder of the season. At the end of the 2013–14 season, he went on to make twenty-two appearances in all competitions. Following his recovery in time for the pre-season friendly, Lawson played his first game since recovering from an injury, in a 1–0 loss against St Johnstone on 30 August 2014. However, his return was soon short-lived after just three appearances when he suffered injuries that kept him out for the remainder of the season once again.

On 2 June 2015, he was released by the club at the end of his contract.

=== Formartine United ===
On 6 July 2015, Lawson signed for Formartine United on a three-year contract. It came after when he moved back to Aberdeen.

Lawson made his debut for the club, in a 1–0 win against Forres Mechanics in the opening game of the season. On 19 October 2015, he scored his first goal for Formartine United, in a 4–1 win against Fort William. During his time at the club, he became their captain for the side. However, he faced his own injury concern along the way.

However, in the 2016–17 season, Lawson suffered a knee injury that saw him out for two months and scored on his return against Cove Rangers on 8 January 2017. Despite his appointment as player/manager at Formartine United, he often appear in the club's first team selection throughout his time, including making an appearance against Keith on 13 January 2020. However, he continued to suffer injuries as well. At one point during the 2018–19 season, Lawson missed one match to attend his friend's wedding.

=== Banks O' Dee FC ===
On 3 June 2022, Lawson joined Banks o' Dee as a player.

However, he suffered an injury that saw him miss the start of the 2022–23 season. After recovering, Lawson made his debut for the club, coming on as a 72nd-minute substitute, in an 8–0 win against Wick Academy on 3 September 2022. However, in a match against Deveronvale on 5 October 2022, he suffered a calf injury and was substituted in the 31st minute, as Banks O' Dee won 2–0. On 5 November 2022, Lawson made his return from injury, starting the whole game as a centre–back position, in a 7–0 win against Strathspey Thistle. By the time he was appointed as a new manager of the club, Lawson made eight appearances in all competitions.

== Managerial career ==
=== Formartine United ===
On 16 September 2017, Lawson was appointed as player/manager of Formartine United, with Russell Anderson his assistant. The pair led the club to winning the Highland League Cup after beating Fraserburgh 2–1. In the wake of the pandemic, Lawson said he was determined to look after Formartine United players.

During a 4–0 loss against Inverurie Loco Works on 16 January 2022, both Lawson and Anderson were both sent–off in the second half and sent to the stand. Lawson resigned on 13 March 2022 along with assistant manager Russell Anderson by mutual consent with the club

=== Banks O' Dee FC ===
On 28 January 2023, Lawson was appointed as a co-manager alongside Josh Winton as the new manager of Banks o' Dee.

Both Lawson and Winton helped the club win the Highland League Cup after beating Inverurie Loco Works 1–0. As a result, the pair signed a contract extension with Banks O' Dee. On 14 December 2023, the pair, once again, led the club win Aberdeenshire Shield by beating Aberdeen 2–0. Having led Banks O' Dee to a fourth-place finish in the league, the pair was named Highland League team of the season by Press and Journal.

On 21 November 2024, the pair signed a long-term contract extension with Banks O' Dee.

== International career ==
Lawson represented Scotland’s levels. Between 2004 and 2005, he was a regular for the Scotland U21.

== Personal life ==
His brother-in-law is former Aberdeen captain Russell Anderson (Anderson is married to Lawson's sister), and he was an Aberdeen fan while growing up, along with his family.

Lawson is best friends with Gary Irvine, having known each other at Celtic. In September 2019, he became a first-time father when his wife went to labour.

== Honours ==
=== Ross County ===
- Second Division
- 2010–11 Scottish Challenge Cup
- 2011–12 Scottish First Division

=== Individual ===
- Scottish First Division Player of the Month: January 2010
