= Jamie Reid (footballer, born January 1994) =

Scottish footballer (born 1994)

Personal information
- Date of birth: 11 January 1994 (age 32)
- Place of birth: Dundee, Scotland
- Position: Midfielder

Team information
- Current team: Brechin City

Senior career*
Years	Team	Apps	(Gls)
2011–2015	Dundee	5	(1)
2013	→ Stenhousemuir (loan)	13	(2)
2013–2014	→ Montrose (loan)	10	(0)
2014–2015	→ Stenhousemuir (loan)	12	(0)
2015	→ Elgin City (loan)	15	(4)
2015–2016	Arbroath	22	(1)
2016–2018	Elgin City	37	(5)
2018–2019	Lochee United		
2019–	Brechin City	0	(0)
- * Club domestic league appearances and goals as of 17:02, 31 July 2019 (UTC)

Jamie Reid (born 11 January 1994) is a Scottish professional footballer, who plays for Brechin City as a winger. Reid has previously played for Dundee, Stenhousemuir, Montrose, Arbroath, Elgin City and Lochee United.

== Career ==
A member of the Dundee under 19 squad, Reid was promoted to the first team on 23 July 2011, where he was an unused substitute in their victory over Arbroath in the Challenge Cup. He was an unused substitute on one further occasion, before making his debut aged 18, from the start on 5 May 2012, he scored the only goal in a 1–0 victory over Livingston.

He made his first appearance of the 2012–13 season as a substitute on 31 July 2012, in a 0–0 draw against Brechin City in the League Cup, with Dundee winning on penalties. Following Dundee's promotion to the Scottish Premier League he was given the squad number 33 for the new season.

In January 2013, Reid joined Stenhousemuir on loan, scoring twice and creating a number of assists during his thirteen games at Ochilview Park. Upon his return to Dundee, Reid signed a new two-year contract keeping him at the Dark Blues until 2015. In December 2013, Reid moved on loan to Montrose for one month, with the loan being extended for the rest of the 2013–14 season in January 2014.

In July 2014, Reid was loaned out again, agreeing to a second spell at Stenhousemuir. After returning to Dundee, he moved on loan on 30 January 2015, to Elgin City for the remainder of the 2014–15 season. On 14 May 2015, Reid was released from Dundee alongside teammate Iain Davidson by mutual consent.

Shortly after leaving Dundee, Reid was signed by Scottish League Two side Arbroath

After one season with Arbroath, Reid returned to Elgin City for his second spell with the club. In November 2017, he joined Junior club Lochee United in a swap deal with defender Aaron Whitehead.

On 11 July 2019, Reid returned to the senior leagues, signing for Brechin City.

== Career statistics ==
As of match played 27 July 2019

Appearances and goals by club, season and competition
Club	Season	League			Scottish Cup		League Cup		Other		Total	
Club	Season	Division	Apps	Goals	Apps	Goals	Apps	Goals	Apps	Goals	Apps	Goals
Dundee	2011–12	Scottish First Division	1	1	0	0	0	0	0	0	1	1
Dundee	2012–13	Scottish Premier League	0	0	0	0	1	0	0	0	1	0
Dundee	2013–14	Scottish Championship	4	0	0	0	0	0	1 (Note: Appearances in the Scottish Challenge Cup)	0	5	0
Dundee	2014–15	Scottish Premiership	0	0	0	0	0	0	0	0	0	0
Dundee	Total		5	1	0	0	1	0	1	0	7	1
Stenhousemuir (loan)	2012–13	Scottish Second Division	13	2	0	0	0	0	0	0	13	2
Montrose (loan)	2013–14	Scottish League Two	10	0	0	0	0	0	0	0	10	0
Stenhousemuir (loan)	2014–15	Scottish League One	12	0	1	0	1	0	1	0	15	0
Elgin City (loan)	2014–15	Scottish League Two	15	4	0	0	0	0	0	0	15	4
Arbroath	2015–16	Scottish League Two	22	1	1	0	0	0	1	0	24	1
Elgin City	2016–17	Scottish League Two	26	3	3	0	3	0	1	0	33	3
Elgin City	2017–18	Scottish League Two	11	2	2	0	3	0	3	0	19	2
Elgin City	Total		37	5	5	0	6	0	4	0	52	5
Brechin City	2019–20	Scottish League Two	0	0	0	0	4	0	0	0	4	0
Career total			114	13	7	0	12	0	7	0	140	13
