= Milan Mišůn =

Czech footballer (born 1990)

Personal information
- Full name: Milan Mišůn
- Date of birth: 21 February 1990 (age 36)
- Place of birth: Příbram, Czechoslovakia
- Height: 1.86 m (6 ft 1 in)
- Positions: Centre back; left back

Team information
- Current team: Baník Sokolov
- Number: 3

Youth career
- 2006: SK Spartak Příbram

Senior career*
Years	Team	Apps	(Gls)
2006–2009	1. FK Příbram	24	(2)
2009–2012	Celtic	0	(0)
2010	→ Dundee (loan)	2	(0)
2012–2014	Viktoria Plzeň	0	(0)
2012–2014	→ 1. FK Příbram (loan)	63	(1)
2014–2015	Baumit Jablonec	6	(0)
2015–2018	Vysočina Jihlava	36	(1)
2018	Olympia Radotín	9	(0)
2018–	Baník Sokolov	6	(0)

International career
2008–2009	Czech Republic U19	8	(2)
- * Club domestic league appearances and goals as of 31 August 2018

Milan Mišůn (born 21 February 1990) is a Czech footballer who currently plays as a left back or centre back for Baník Sokolov in the Czech 2. Liga.

== Club career ==
=== FK Příbram ===
Mišůn played for FK Příbram, where he made 24 appearances and scored two goals.

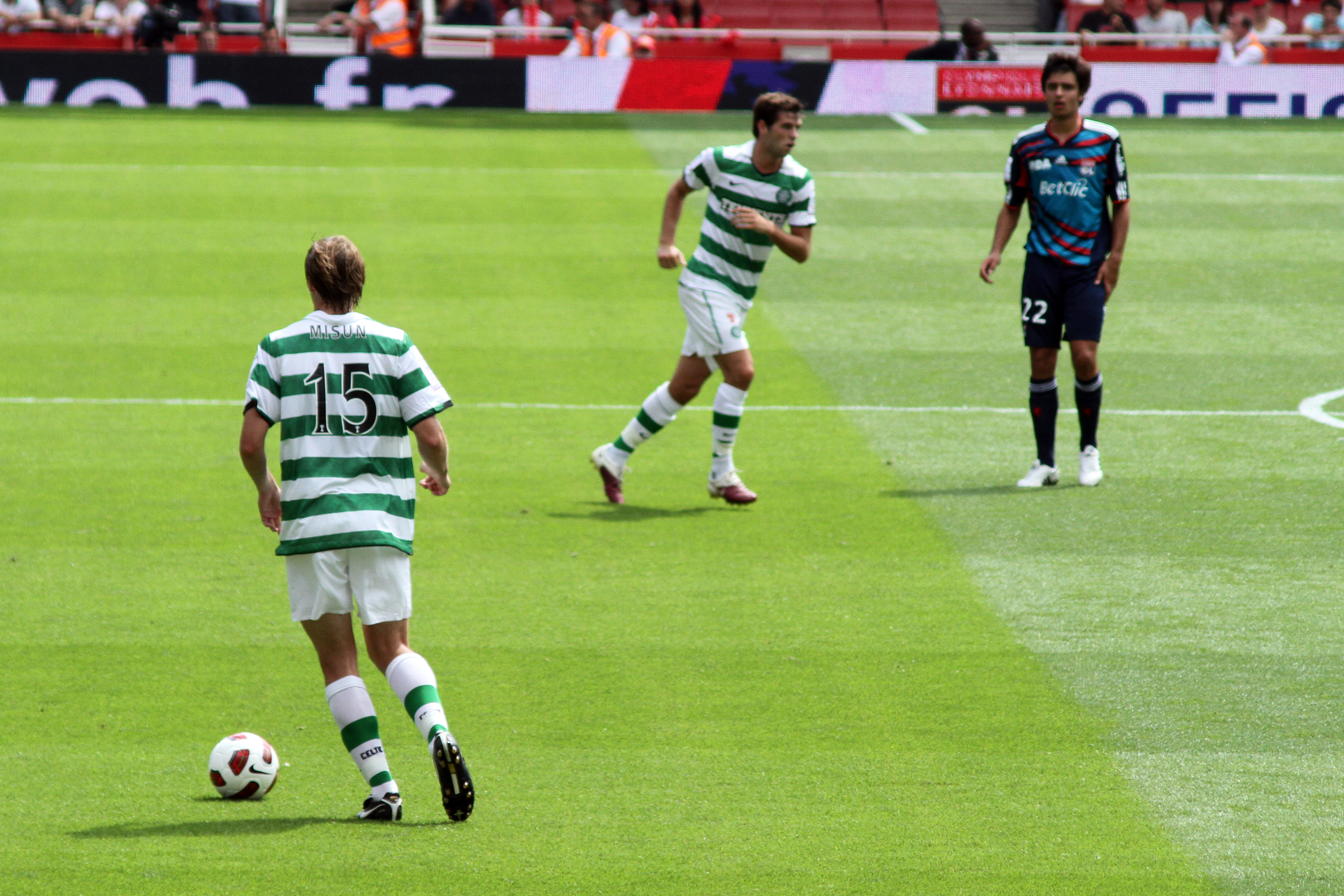
Milan Mišůn playing for Celtic FC against Lyon FC during the Emirates Cup 2010

=== Celtic ===
Mišůn's signed for Scottish Premier League side Celtic in December 2008 after they fought off competition from AC Milan and Copenhagen Mišůn was given the number 15 shirt and was eligible to play for Celtic from 1 January 2009. He was an unused substitute in a 4–2 loss to Aberdeen on 18 January 2009.

==== Dundee ====
Mišůn was loaned out for a month to Scottish First Division side Dundee on 17 September 2010 and made his debut the following weekend in a 0–0 draw against Raith Rovers. He returned to Celtic after Dundee fell into administration.

==== Move to Swindon ====
After returning to Celtic, on 28 January 2011 Mišůn apparently joined League One side Swindon Town for an undisclosed fee - however, it was later revealed he had not officially signed a contract.

=== Viktoria Plzeň ===
After joining Viktoria Plzeň, Mišůn was linked with a move to Sheffield United in July 2012.

== International career ==
Mišůn was a member of the Czech under-19 team and made six appearances, his last being in a 5–1 win against Estonia on 26 May 2009. He scored one goal, a shot from 25 yards against Spain on 23 May 2009. He has played at under-20 level for his country.
