= Iain Davidson =

Scottish footballer

Personal information
- Date of birth: 14 January 1984 (age 42)
- Place of birth: Kirkcaldy, Scotland
- Positions: Centre-back; defensive midfielder

Youth career
- 2002–2003: Sunderland

Senior career*
Years	Team	Apps	(Gls)
2003–2004	Brechin City	6	(0)
2004	Scarborough	2	(0)
2004–2012	Raith Rovers	221	(10)
2012–2015	Dundee	85	(5)
2015–2021	Raith Rovers	151	(6)
2021–2022	Brechin City	30	(2)
2022–2023	Cowdenbeath	0	(0)
- * Club domestic league appearances and goals

Iain Davidson (born 14 January 1984) is a Scottish retired professional footballer. Davidson mainly played as a defensive midfielder but can also be played in the defence. He has previously played for Brechin City, Scarborough, two spells at Raith Rovers, Dundee, two spells at Brechin City and Cowdenbeath.

In 2009, while he was captain at Raith Rovers, Davidson was charged and convicted of assault during an incident at Kitty's Bar and Club in Kirkcaldy. He was convicted of attacking a man with a bottle.

In 2021 the SFA found Davidson guilty of racist and discriminatory behaviour towards an Inverness player. He received a four match ban and was ordered to complete a FIFA e-learning course before being allowed to play again.

In 2022 Davidson pleaded guilty to behaving in a threatening/abusive manner, aggravated by the fact it involved abuse of his former partner. He was given a six-month suspended custodial sentence for good behaviour and a six-month non-harassment order against his former partner. He is due to appear in court again on 6 June 2023.

== Career ==
Davidson started his career on the books of Sunderland, but was released in 2003. He headed back to Scotland to sign with part-timers Brechin City, but only lasted six games at Glebe Park before heading back to England to play a couple of games with Scarborough.

Upon his release from the now defunct Yorkshire side, Davidson returned to his home town of Kirkcaldy to sign for Raith Rovers. Despite having his injury troubles, Davidson was appointed team captain.

Davidson signed a one-year contract with Dundee in June 2012., where he spent 3 seasons.

On 14 May 2015, Davidson was released from Dundee alongside teammate Jamie Reid by mutual consent. On 8 August 2015, it was announced that Davidson had signed back at Raith Rovers. On 15 July 2020, it was announced Davidson had signed for another season, his 14th with the club. Davidson left Raith Rovers in May 2021, at the end of the season, the third player to have played over 500 games for the club.

In June 2021, Davidson returned to Brechin City, now in the Highland Football League.

== Career statistics ==
As of match played 11 August 2021

Appearances and goals by club, season and competition
Club	Season	League			National Cup		League Cup		Other		Total	
Club	Season	Division	Apps	Goals	Apps	Goals	Apps	Goals	Apps	Goals	Apps	Goals
Brechin City	2003–04	First Division	4	0	0	0	0	0	2 (Note: Appearances in the Scottish Challenge Cup)	0	6	0
Scarborough	2003–04	Conference National	2	0	0	0	—		0	0	2	0
Raith Rovers	2004–05	First Division	26	0	0	0	0	0	1	0	27	0
Raith Rovers	2005–06	Second Division	29	2	1	0	1	0	3	0	34	2
Raith Rovers	2006–07	Second Division	29	2	1	0	1	0	3 (Note: One appearance in the Scottish Challenge Cup and two in the First Division play-offs)	0	34	2
Raith Rovers	2007–08	Second Division	30	3	2	1	1	0	2 (Note: Appearances in the First Division play-offs)	0	35	4
Raith Rovers	2008–09	Second Division	33	1	2	0	1	0	1	0	37	1
Raith Rovers	2009–10	First Division	20	1	1	0	1	0	1	0	23	1
Raith Rovers	2010–11	First Division	31	1	0	0	2	0	0	0	33	1
Raith Rovers	2011–12	First Division	23	0	1	0	0	0	1	0	25	0
Raith Rovers	Raith Rovers total I		221	10	8	1	7	0	12	0	248	11
Dundee	2012–13	Scottish Premier League	36	1	3	0	1	0	—		40	1
Dundee	2013–14	Championship	26	3	1	0	1	0	1	0	29	3
Dundee	2014–15	Scottish Premier League	13	1	0	0	1	0	—		14	1
Dundee	Dundee total		75	5	4	0	3	0	1	0	83	5
Raith Rovers	2015–16	Championship	29	0	2	0	2	1	3 (Note: One appearance in the Scottish Challenge Cup and two in the Premiership play-offs)	0	36	1
Raith Rovers	2016–17	Championship	26	1	2	0	4	0	3 (Note: One appearance in the Scottish Challenge Cup and two in the Championship play-offs)	0	35	1
Raith Rovers	2017–18	League One	29	1	0	0	3	0	5	0	37	1
Raith Rovers	2018–19	League One	29	2	3	0	3	0	5	0	40	2
Raith Rovers	2019–20	League One	22	0	2	0	4	0	5	0	33	0
Raith Rovers	2020–21	Championship	16	2	1	0	2	0	3 (Note: Appearances in the Premiership play-offs)	0	22	2
Raith Rovers	Raith Rovers total II		151	6	10	0	23	1	24	0	203	7
Brechin City	2021–22	Highland League	3	0	0	0	1	0	1	0	5	0
Career total			447	21	22	1	33	1	37	0	534	23
