= Gary Irvine =

Scottish footballer

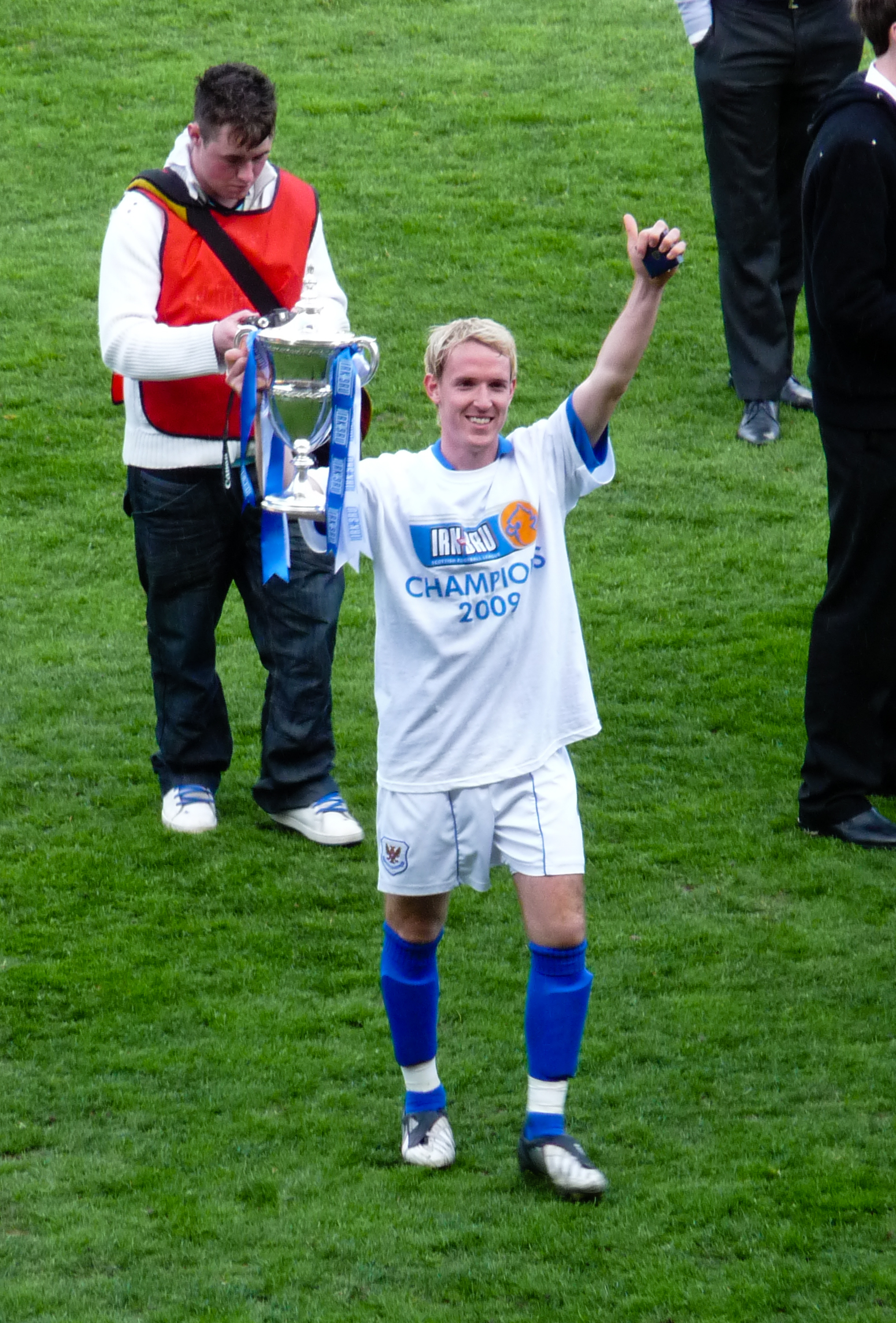

Personal information
- Full name: Gary Irvine
- Date of birth: 17 March 1985 (age 41)
- Place of birth: Bellshill, Scotland
- Position: Defender

Youth career
- 2003–2006: Celtic

Senior career*
Years	Team	Apps	(Gls)
2006–2007	Celtic	0	(0)
2006	→ Ross County (loan)	17	(0)
2007–2010	St Johnstone	85	(1)
2010–2016	Dundee	166	(6)
2016–2018	St Mirren	56	(0)
2019–2022	Forfar Athletic	57	(2)

International career^{‡}
2006	Scotland U21	2	(0)

Managerial career
- 2021–2022: Forfar Athletic
- * Club domestic league appearances and goals as of 9 November 2022 (UTC) ‡ National team caps and goals as of 19:27, 30 May 2012 (UTC)

Gary Irvine (born 17 March 1985) is a Scottish professional footballer and manager. He has previously played for Celtic, Ross County, St Johnstone, Dundee and St Mirren and Forfar Athletic, the last of which he also performed the role of player-manager for.

== Career ==
=== Celtic & Ross County ===
Irvine started his career at Celtic, but failed to make an appearance for the club during his time there.

At the start of the 2006–07 season, he moved on loan to Ross County. During his time at County, he was involved as they won the 2006–07 Scottish Challenge Cup, beating Clyde on penalties.

=== St Johnstone ===
After leaving Celtic, Irvine signed for Scottish First Division side St Johnstone. In his first season at McDiarmid Park, he won the 2007–08 Scottish Challenge Cup, his second winners medal in that competition in successive seasons, with St Johnstone winning 3–2 against Dunfermline Athletic. The following season, he was part of the squad as St Johnstone won the Scottish First Division. At the end of the 2009–10 season he was one of eight players released by the club. Irvine scored once during his spell at the club; his goal coming in a 3–1 win over Dunfermline Athletic in April 2009.

=== Dundee ===
On 24 July 2010, Irvine signed for Dundee, of the Scottish First Division. In July 2012, with Dundee having been promoted to the Scottish Premier League after the demotion of Rangers, he signed a new deal with the club, despite interest from several Scottish Premier League clubs including his former team, Ross County. After Dundee's relegation from the Scottish Premier League, Irvine agreed terms on a new contract for the 2013–14 season.

=== St Mirren ===
On 29 January 2016 Saints signed Irvine from Dundee until the end of the season, with the option of a further year. He was released by St Mirren at the end of the 2017–18 season.

=== Forfar Athletic ===
Irvine joined Forfar Athletic in February 2019, until the end of the season. On 9 April 2021, Irvine agreed to take charge of the Loons after manager Stuart Malcolm and his assistants resigned from their positions. Irvine was announced as the club's new manager on 4 May. Despite coming close to promotion in the 2021–22 season, a very disappointing start to the following season which left the Loons bottom of the table led to Forfar releasing Irvine on 9 November 2022.

== Career statistics ==
As of match played 24 September 2022

Appearances and goals by club, season and competition
Club	Season	League			Cup		League Cup		Other^{[A]}		Total	
Club	Season	Division	Apps	Goals	Apps	Goals	Apps	Goals	Apps	Goals	Apps	Goals
Celtic	2006–07	Scottish Premier League	0	0	0	0	0	0	0	0	0	0
Ross County (loan)	2006–07	First Division	17	0	0	0	2	0	5 (Note: Appearances in the Scottish Challenge Cup)	0	24	0
St Johnstone	2007–08	First Division	33	0	5	0	1	0	4	0	43	0
St Johnstone	2008–09	First Division	35	1	1	0	2	0	1	0	39	1
St Johnstone	2009–10	Scottish Premier League	17	0	2	0	3	0	—		22	0
St Johnstone	Total		85	1	8	0	6	0	5	0	104	1
Dundee	2010–11	First Division	31	1	1	0	2	0	2	0	36	1
Dundee	2011–12	First Division	35	1	3	0	2	0	2	0	42	1
Dundee	2012–13	Scottish Premier League	34	0	2	0	3	0	—		39	0
Dundee	2013–14	Championship	33	0	1	0	2	0	3	0	39	0
Dundee	2014–15	Premiership	26	4	2	0	2	0	—		30	4
Dundee	2015–16	Premiership	7	0	0	0	0	0	—		7	0
Dundee	Total		166	6	9	0	11	0	7	0	193	6
St Mirren	2015–16	Championship	16	0	0	0	0	0	0	0	16	0
St Mirren	2016–17	Championship	33	0	3	0	3	0	5	0	44	0
St Mirren	2017–18	Championship	7	0	0	0	4	0	1	0	12	0
St Mirren	Total		56	0	3	0	7	0	6	0	72	0
Forfar Athletic	2018–19	Scottish League One	12	2	0	0	0	0	2 (Note: Appearances in Scottish Championship play-offs)	0	14	2
Forfar Athletic	2019–20	Scottish League One	25	0	1	0	5	0	0	0	31	0
Forfar Athletic	2020–21	Scottish League One	17	0	3	0	3	0	0	0	23	0
Forfar Athletic	2021–22	Scottish League Two	2	0	0	0	2	0	2	0	6	0
Forfar Athletic	2022–23	Scottish League Two	1	0	0	0	0	0	0	0	1	0
Forfar Athletic	Total		57	2	4	0	10	0	4	0	75	2
Total			381	9	24	0	36	0	27	0	468	9

=== Managerial record ===
As of match played 5 November 2022

Managerial record by team and tenure
Team	Nat	From	To	Record					Ref.
Team	Nat	From	To	G	W	D	L	Win %	Ref.
Forfar Athletic	(Scotland)	9 April 2021	9 November 2022	75	26	17	32	34.67	
Total				75	26	17	32	34.67	—

- initially caretaker.
- includes League Cup forfeit win over Ross County on 8 July 2021 after the club cancelled scheduled fixture due to Co-vid.

== International career ==
Irvine was capped twice for the Scotland under–21s, against Iceland and Turkey in 2006.

== Honours ==
Ross County

- Scottish Challenge Cup: 2006–07

St Johnstone

- Scottish First Division: 2008–09
- Scottish Challenge Cup: 2007–08

Dundee

- Scottish Championship: 2013–14

St. Mirren

- Scottish Championship: 2017–18
