= Sean Higgins (footballer) =

Scottish footballer and manager

Personal information
- Full name: Sean Higgins
- Date of birth: 29 October 1984 (age 41)
- Place of birth: Glasgow, Scotland
- Position: Forward

Team information
- Current team: Rossvale (player/assistant manager)

Senior career*
Years	Team	Apps	(Gls)
2002–2009	Ross County	173	(47)
2009–2011	Dundee	52	(14)
2011–2012	St Johnstone	6	(0)
2012	→ Ayr United (loan)	1	(0)
2012–2013	Falkirk	25	(4)
2013–2014	Stenhousemuir	30	(9)
2014–2015	Cowdenbeath	32	(5)
2015–2017	Clyde	61	(16)
2017–2018	Albion Rovers	19	(3)
2018–2019	Clydebank		
2022-2023	AS Airdrie F.C.	8	(3)
- * Club domestic league appearances and goals as of 00:28, 3 November 2020 (UTC)

Sean Higgins is a Scottish footballer who plays as a striker for Rossvale, as well as the club's assistant manager.

== Career ==
=== Ross County ===
Higgins started his career with Hamilton Academical where he played at youth level. Higgins then moved to Ross County in 2002 where he spent seven years at Victoria Park, where he played in 173 league matches and scored 47 league goals.

=== Dundee ===
In 2009 Higgins joined fellow First Division club Dundee where he spent just under five years, where he played in 52 league matches and scored 14 league goals. He would be a part of the "Deefiant" squad that overcame administration and a 25-point deduction to survive in 2010–11, a season that included a club record-breaking 23-game unbeaten streak. Higgins would play a key role in that run, particularly in a game against Queen of the South where he netted an equaliser in an eventual 2–1 win to notch Dundee's twentieth consecutive undefeated game, breaking the legendary 1962 team's record. During this game, Higgins wore a raw beefsteak in his boot to aid a freak injury, and would score his goal with the steak-filled boot.

=== St Johnstone ===
In May 2011 Higgins signed for St Johnstone for the 2011–12 season, where he played in six league matches without scoring any goals. Higgins was loaned out to Ayr United during the season, where he played in one league match without scoring any goals.

=== Falkirk ===
Higgins joined Falkirk on transfer deadline day in August 2012. After an up and down campaign, Higgins left the club at the end of the 2012–13 season, having played in 25 league matches and scoring four league goals.

=== Stenhousemuir ===
Higgins signed for Stenhousemuir in the summer of 2013. He was a main stay in the Stenny team, as they narrowly missed out on a play-off spot at the end of the season. Higgins will perhaps be remembered for scoring a double, including an equalising penalty, in a 3–3 draw against Rangers at Ibrox Stadium on 22 February 2014. He finished the campaign having played 30 league matches for Stenhousmuir, tallying up nine goals.

=== Cowdenbeath ===
After leaving Stenhousemuir at the end of the season, on 30 May 2014, it was confirmed that Higgins had agreed terms with Scottish Championship outfit Cowdenbeath for the 2014–15 season. He scored seven goals in 37 games for the Blue Brazil.

=== Clyde ===
On 20 May 2015, Higgins agreed to sign for Clyde on a one-year deal. On 29 August 2015 Higgins scored a double against East Stirlingshire in a 3–1 win at Broadwood. After two seasons with Clyde, Higgins was released by the club in May 2017.

=== Albion Rovers ===
Shortly after leaving Clyde, Higgins signed for Scottish League One club Albion Rovers on 2 June 2017.

=== Clydebank & Rossvale ===
In June 2018, Higgins signed for Clydebank as player/coach. In 2019, he joined Rossvale as a player and assistant manager.

== Honours ==
Dundee

- Scottish Challenge Cup: 2009–10
