= Davide Grassi =

Italian footballer (born 1986)

Personal information
- Date of birth: 13 January 1986 (age 40)
- Place of birth: Montecchio, Italy
- Height: 1.92 m (6 ft 3 1/2 in)
- Position: Centre back

Team information
- Current team: Byron Boys Club (player-manager)

Senior career*
Years	Team	Apps	(Gls)
2005–2006	Cattolica	5	(0)
2006–2007	Bonifika	23	(1)
2007–2008	Mérida	9	(0)
2009	Sant Andreu	0	(0)
2009–2010	Aberdeen	23	(0)
2010–2011	Sorrento Calcio	3	(0)
2011	Triestina	0	(0)
2011–2012	Brussels	34	(1)
2012–2013	Dundee	13	(0)
2013–2014	Aris Limassol	20	(1)
2014–2015	VfL Osnabrück	24	(0)
2015	Rapid București	9	(0)
2016	Sarawak	12	(0)
2016–2018	Nea Salamina	42	(3)
2018	Kerkyra	4	(0)
2018	Reggiana	1	(0)
2020-	Byron Boys Club (player-manager)	10	(2)
- * Club domestic league appearances and goals as of 13:28, 22 December 2017 (UTC)

Davide Grassi (born 13 January 1986) is an Italian professional footballer and Manager, who currently works as player-manager for the Aberdeen side Byron Boys Club

== Career ==
Grassi began his career at the youth teams of Parma, before making his professional debut in Slovenia, ending an 11-year stay with Parma. In the 2007/08 season, Grassi played for Mérida UD.

Grassi had a successful trial with Scottish Premier League club Aberdeen and was offered a one-year deal. He made his debut against Motherwell in August, having come on as a substitute. During a Scottish League Cup match against Dundee on 24 September 2009, he suffered a triple cheekbone fracture. Grassi was released from Aberdeen on 1 July 2010.

Since leaving Aberdeen, Grassi signed for Sorrento Calcio in July 2010 but left Sorrento, having made three appearances.

On 31 January 2011, he was signed by Serie B side Triestina. However, Grassi left Triestina, having made no appearances.

Shortly after leaving Triestina, Grassi joined Belgian side Brussels, whose team in Second Division in Belgian League. Grassi made his debut for the club, in the opening game of the season on 17 August 2011, in a 1–1 draw against Oostende; two-month later on 15 October 2011, he scored his first goal in a 4–0 win over Wetteren but however, he received a red card. Eventually, Grassi played the next game after winning the appeal, allowing him to play the next game. It couldn't get worse for Grassi in the next game on 23 October 2011 when Grassi scored an own goal in a 2–2 draw against Lommel United. In Brussels, Grassi made 33 appearances and established himself in the first team.

He signed for Scottish Premier League side Dundee on 2 August 2012, subject to international clearance. He made his debut for the club in a 2–0 loss against St Mirren on 11 August 2012. Grassi would suffered a knee injury, having an operation, and resulted him out for six weeks Manager Barry Smith says he is not rushing for Grassi return from injury Eventually, Grassi made his return from injury in a 3–0 loss against Hibernian on 6 October 2012. After another appearance, Grassi once again suffered an injury after undergoing knee surgery, which resulted in him being out for two months. In February, Grassi made a recovery from injury and was back in training. Later in the season, Dundee would soon suffer relegation to Scottish Championship and Grassi would be released by the club, making thirteen appearances in total.

After leaving Dundee, Grassi moved to Cyprus by joining Aris Limassol, subject to a medical. One year later, he signed for VfL Osnabrück.

In 2020, Grassi took over the Aberdeen Side, the Byron Boys Club. On 10 October of that year, due to a string of injuries, Grassi made himself available as a player and started on the bench for a game against Lewis United. He substituted himself on in the 75th minute and helped keep a clean sheet in a 1–0 victory. Grassi continued to make himself available for the first team and scored the winner in a 2–1 win over Glentanner and was named Man of the Match. Grassi scored again in a 1–1 draw vs Middlefield Wasps in another Man of the Match performance.
