= 2013–14 Raith Rovers F.C. season =

Raith Rovers
2013–14 season
- Chairman: Turnbull Hutton
- Manager: Grant Murray
- Stadium: Stark's Park
- Scottish Championship: 7th place
- Challenge Cup: Winners
- League Cup: 2nd Round (lost to Hearts on penalties)
- Scottish Cup: Quarter-Finals (lost to St Johnstone)
- Highest home attendance: 4,039 (v Dundee, 2 January 2014)
- Lowest home attendance: 978 (v Alloa Athletic, 25 February 2014)
- Average home league attendance: 1,659
| Home colours | Away colours |

The 2013–14 season is Raith Rovers' fifth consecutive season in the second tier of Scottish football and the first in the newly established Scottish Championship, having been promoted from the Scottish Second Division at the end of the 2008–09 season. Raith Rovers will also compete in the Challenge Cup, League Cup and the Scottish Cup.

== Summary ==
=== Management ===
Raith will be led by player-manager Grant Murray for the 2013–14 season as with the previous season.

== Results & fixtures ==
Win Draw Loss Postponed

=== Preseason ===
| 10 July 2013 Friendly | Raith Rovers | 1–2 | Sheffield United | Stark's Park |
| 19:45 | Spence 13' | Raith Report | McDonald 29'; Murphy 36' | Attendance: 1,054; Referee: McLean |

| 12 July 2013 Friendly | Raith Rovers | 0–0 | Hibernian | Stark's Park |
| 19:45 | | Raith Report | | Attendance: 2,050; Referee: McKendrick |

| 17 July 2013 Friendly | Raith Rovers | 0–5 | Heart of Midlothian | Stark's Park |
| 19:30 | | Raith Report | McHattie 6'; B.King 42'; Walker 49'; Stevenson 63'; Oliver 88' | Attendance: 1,825; Referee: Muir |

| 20 July 2013 Friendly | Raith Rovers | 2–2 | Inverness Caledonian Thistle | Stark's Park |
| 15:00 | Anderson 2'; Elliot 36' | Raith Report | Ross 42'; Polworth 83' | Referee: Clancy |

=== Scottish Championship ===
| 10 August 2013 Scottish Championship | Raith Rovers | 0–1 | Hamilton Academical | Stark's Park |
| 15:00 | | Raith Report | Keatings 67' | Attendance: 1,652; Referee: Allan |

| 17 August 2013 Scottish Championship | Cowdenbeath | 3–4 | Raith Rovers | Central Park |
| 15:00 | Morton 9'; Adamson 43'; Stewart 65'; Adam (red card) 90' | Raith Report | Spence 3', 81' (pen.), 90' (pen.); Cardle 26' | Attendance: 837; Referee: Salmond |

| 24 August 2013 Scottish Championship | Raith Rovers | 0–0 | Dundee | Stark's Park |
| 15:00 | | Raith Report | | Attendance: 2,603; Referee: Beaton |

| 31 August 2013 Scottish Championship | Greenock Morton | 1–1 | Raith Rovers | Cappielow |
| 15:00 | Imrie 39' (pen.) | Raith Report | Anderson 78' | Attendance: 1,545; Referee: Cook |

| 14 September 2013 Scottish Championship | Queen of the South | 0–1 | Raith Rovers | Palmerston Park |
| 15:00 | | Raith Report | Spence 18' | Attendance: 1,620; Referee: Robertson |

| 21 September 2013 Scottish Championship | Raith Rovers | 4–2 | Alloa Athletic | Stark's Park |
| 15:00 | Cardle 28', 90'; Anderson 48'; Elliot 79' | Raith Report | Cawley 16'; McCord 62' (pen.) | Attendance: 1,397; Referee: Murray |

| 28 September 2013 Scottish Championship | Raith Rovers | 1–1 | Falkirk | Stark's Park |
| 15:00 | Anderson 2' | Raith Report | Faulds 90' | Attendance: 1,715; Referee: McKendrick |

| 5 October 2013 Scottish Championship | Dumbarton | 2–4 | Raith Rovers | Dumbarton Football Stadium |
| 15:00 | Prunty 89', 90' (pen.) | Raith Report | Elliot 17'; Spence 56' (pen.); Hill 61'; Donaldson (red card) 90'; Vaughan 90' | Attendance: 843; Referee: Colvin |

| 19 October 2013 Scottish Championship | Hamilton Academical | 1–1 | Raith Rovers | New Douglas Park |
| 15:00 | Keatings 31' | Raith Report | Hill (yellow card) 34' (red card); Elliot 70' | Attendance: 1,113; Referee: Brines |

| 26 October 2013 Scottish Championship | Raith Rovers | 2–1 | Greenock Morton | Stark's Park |
| 15:00 | Moon 44'; Smith 90' | Raith Report | Novo 69' | Attendance: 1,569; Referee: Salmond |

| 29 October 2013 Scottish Championship | Raith Rovers | 1–0 | Livingston | Stark's Park |
| 19:45 | Smith 22' | Raith Report | Denholm (red card) 35' | Attendance: 1,304; Referee: Muir |

| 9 November 2013 Scottish Championship | Dundee | 2–0 | Raith Rovers | Dens Park |
| 15:00 | Conroy 28'; Wighton 49' | Raith Report | | Attendance: 5,064; Referee: Dallas |

| 16 November 2013 Scottish Championship | Alloa Athletic | 1–0 | Raith Rovers | Recreation Park |
| 15:00 | Kirk 64' | Raith Report | | Attendance: 858; Referee: Thomson |

| 23 November 2013 Scottish Championship | Raith Rovers | 2–1 | Queen of the South | Stark's Park |
| 15:00 | Elliot 63', 87' | Raith Report | Reilly 62' | Attendance: 1,497; Referee: Northcroft |

| 7 December 2013 Scottish Championship | Falkirk | 3–1 | Raith Rovers | Falkirk Stadium |
| 15:00 | Sibbald 4'; McGrandles 25'; Kingsley 51' | Raith Report | Spence 73' | Attendance: 2,934; Referee: Muir |

| 14 December 2013 Scottish Championship | Raith Rovers | 2–1 | Dumbarton | Stark's Park |
| 15:00 | Vaughan 51'; Cardle (red card) 60'; Thomson 74' | Raith Report | McDougall 90' | Attendance: 1,351; Referee: Murray |

| 21 December 2013 Scottish Championship | Raith Rovers | 3–3 | Cowdenbeath | Stark's Park |
| 15:00 | Hill 32'; Elliot 60'; Booth 83' (pen.) | Raith Report | Stewart 11'; Hemmings 74' (pen.), 90' | Attendance: 1,597; Referee: Aitken |

| 28 December 2013 Scottish Championship | Livingston | 3–0 | Raith Rovers | Almondvale Stadium |
| 15:00 | Thomson 8' (o.g.); Scott 45'; Scougall 62' | Raith Report | | Attendance: 1,322; Referee: Norris |

| 2 January 2014 Scottish Championship | Raith Rovers | 0–2 | Dundee | Stark's Park |
| 15:00 | Thomson (yellow card) 67' (red card) | Raith Report | McAlister 90', 90' | Attendance: 4,039; Referee: Robertson |

| 11 January 2014 Scottish Championship | Greenock Morton | 0–0 | Raith Rovers | Cappielow |
| 15:00 | | Raith Report | | Attendance: 1,745; Referee: Brines |

| 18 January 2014 Scottish Championship | Queen of the South | 1–0 | Raith Rovers | Palmerston Park |
| 15:00 | McShane 25' | Raith Report | | Attendance: 1,538; Referee: Dallas |

| 1 February 2014 Scottish Championship | Cowdenbeath | 1–0 | Raith Rovers | Central Park |
| 15:00 | Hemmings 70' | Raith Report | | Attendance: 961; Referee: Salmond |

| 15 February 2014 Scottish Championship | Raith Rovers | 2–4 | Hamilton Academical | Stark's Park |
| 15:00 | Cardle 82'; Baird 89' | Raith Report | Andreu 4', 32'; Longridge 39'; Keatings 43' (pen.) | Attendance: 1,436; Referee: Collum |

| 22 February 2014 Scottish Championship | Dumbarton | 3–3 | Raith Rovers | Dumbarton Football Stadium |
| 15:00 | Nish 24'; Kane 37'; Agnew 64' | Raith Report | Smith 29', 61'; Baird 57' | Attendance: 786; Referee: Robertson |

| 25 February 2014 Scottish Championship | Raith Rovers | 1–1 | Alloa Athletic | Stark's Park |
| 19:45 | Hill 54' | Raith Report | Ferns 24' | Attendance: 978; Referee: Muir |

| 1 March 2014 Scottish Championship | Raith Rovers | 2–4 | Falkirk | Stark's Park |
| 15:00 | Baird 23'; Booth 28' (pen.) | Raith Report | Hill 18' (o.g.); McCracken 47'; Loy 71'; Millar 87' | Attendance: 1,729; Referee: Anderson |

| 15 March 2014 Scottish Championship | Raith Rovers | 2–1 | Greenock Morton | Stark's Park |
| 15:00 | Spence 68' (pen.), 80' | Raith Report | Vine 18' | Attendance: 1,308; Referee: Charleston |

| 18 March 2014 Scottish Championship | Dundee | 0–0 | Raith Rovers | Dens Park |
| 19:45 | | Raith Report | | Attendance: 4,561; Referee: Finnie |

| 22 March 2014 Scottish Championship | Raith Rovers | 2–4 | Livingston | Stark's Park |
| 15:00 | Baird 48'; Thomson 85' | Raith Report | Sives 5', 54'; McNulty 50' (pen.), 90' | Attendance: 1,329; Referee: Northcroft |

| 25 March 2014 Scottish Championship | Hamilton Academical | 3–2 | Raith Rovers | New Douglas Park |
| 19:45 | Andreu 65'; Keatings 68'; Scotland 90' | Raith Report | Baird 45', 69' | Attendance: 954; Referee: Salmond |

| 29 March 2014 Scottish Championship | Alloa Athletic | 0–1 | Raith Rovers | Recreation Park |
| 15:00 | | Raith Report | Booth 49' | Attendance: 726; Referee: Graham |

| 12 April 2014 Scottish Championship | Raith Rovers | 1–3 | Dumbarton | Stark's Park |
| 15:00 | Smith 59' | Raith Report | Gilhaney 22'; Megginson 28'; Nish 50' | Attendance: 1,602; Referee: Charleston |

| 15 April 2014 Scottish Championship | Raith Rovers | 3–2 | Queen of the South | Stark's Park |
| 19:45 | Cardle 4'; Watson 7'; Baird 81' | Raith Report | Durnan 37', 45' | Attendance: 993; Referee: Aitken |

| 19 April 2014 Scottish Championship | Falkirk | 2–1 | Raith Rovers | Falkirk Stadium |
| 15:00 | Loy 19'; McGrandles 23' | Raith Report | Vaulks 32' (o.g.) | Attendance: 3,200; Referee: Anderson |

| 26 April 2014 Scottish Championship | Raith Rovers | 1–2 | Cowdenbeath | Stark's Park |
| 15:00 | Spence 88' | Raith Report | McKeown 19'; Milne 81' | Attendance: 1,760; Referee: Colvin |

| 3 May 2014 Scottish Championship | Livingston | 2–0 | Raith Rovers | Almondvale Stadium |
| 15:00 | Mullen 8'; Sives (red card) 15'; McNulty 80' | Raith Report | | Attendance: 1,265; Referee: Somers |

=== Scottish Challenge Cup ===
| 27 July 2013 Round 1 | Raith Rovers | 2–1 | Stirling Albion | Stark's Park |
| 15:00 | Moon 73'; Cardle 90' | Raith Report | White 88' (pen.) | Attendance: 1,111; Referee: Norris |

| 20 August 2013 Round 2 | Dunfermline Athletic | 0–2 | Raith Rovers | East End Park |
| 19:45 | | Raith Report | Hill 2'; Fox 65' (pen.) | Attendance: 3,765; Referee: Aitken |

| 7 September 2013 Quarter-Final | Raith Rovers | 1–0 | Falkirk | Stark's Park |
| 15:00 | Spence 86' | Raith Report | | Attendance: 1,565; Referee: Allan |

| 13 October 2013 Semi-Final | Raith Rovers | 3–0 | Annan Athletic | Stark's Park |
| 16:05 | Weatherson 1' (o.g.); Elliot 73', 89' | Raith Report | | Attendance: 2,119; Referee: Clancy |

| 6 April 2014 Final | Raith Rovers | 1–0 (a.e.t.) | Rangers | Easter Road |
| 16:05 | Baird 116' | Raith Report | | Attendance: 19,983; Referee: Kevin Clancy |

=== Scottish League Cup ===
| 3 August 2013 Round 1 | Raith Rovers | 6–0 | Queen's Park | Stark's Park |
| 15:00 | Smith 15'; Cardle 34'; Elliot 57', 67'; Spence 70'; Vaughan 86' | Raith Report | Capuano (yellow card) 61' (red card) | Attendance: 1,219; Referee: Finnie |

| 27 August 2013 Round 2 | Raith Rovers | 1–1 (a.e.t.) (4–5 p) | Heart of Midlothian | Stark's Park |
| 19:45 | Fox 50'; Hill (red card) 74' | Raith Report | Hamill 62' (pen.) | Attendance: 3,668; Referee: Colvin |
| | Penalties |
| | Watson (penalty scored); Vaughan (penalty missed); Elliot (penalty scored); Booth (penalty scored); Fox (penalty missed); Thomson (penalty missed); Cardle (penalty scored); Callachan (penalty missed) | | (penalty missed) Wilson; (penalty scored) Hamill; (penalty scored) McGowan; (penalty scored) Walker; (penalty missed) McHattie; (penalty missed) Holt; (penalty scored) Smith; (penalty scored) McKay |

=== Scottish Cup ===
| 3 November 2013 Scottish Cup round 3 | East Stirlingshire | 0–2 | Raith Rovers | Ochilview Park |
| 15:00 | | Raith Report | Smith 48'; McGowan 80' (o.g.) | Attendance: 716; Referee: Robertson |

| 30 November 2013 Scottish Cup round 4 | Dundee | 0–1 | Raith Rovers | Dens Park |
| 15:00 | | Raith Report | Irvine 8' (o.g.) | Attendance: 3,184; Referee: McLean |

| 8 February 2014 Scottish Cup round 5 | Hibernian | 2–3 | Raith Rovers | Easter Road |
| 14:00 | Stanton 14'; Nelson 45' | Raith Report | Moon 6'; Hill 45'; Anderson 63' | Attendance: 10,503; Referee: McLean |

| 8 March 2014 Scottish Cup Quarter-Final | Raith Rovers | 1–3 | St Johnstone | Stark's Park |
| 12:15 | Cardle 21' | Raith Report | McDonald 4'; Hasselbaink 49'; Anderson 79' | Attendance: 3,767; Referee: Thomson |

== Player statistics ==
=== Captain ===
| No. | P | Name | Country | No. games | Notes |
|---|---|---|---|---|---|
| 2 | DF | Jason Thomson | (Scotland) | 44 | Club captain |

Last updated: 3 May 2014
Source: Competitive match reports.
Competitive matches only
Matches started as captain only
Country: FIFA nationality; No.: Squad number; P: Position; Name: Player name; No. Games: Number of games started as captain.

=== Squad ===
Last updated 3 May 2014

| No. | Pos | Nat | Player | Total | | Scottish Championship | | Challenge Cup | | League Cup | | Scottish Cup | |
| No. | Pos | Nat | Player | Apps | Goals | Apps | Goals | Apps | Goals | Apps | Goals | Apps | Goals |
|---|---|---|---|---|---|---|---|---|---|---|---|---|---|
| 1 | GK | (Scotland) SCO | David McGurn | 16 | 0 | 10+0 | 0 | 4+0 | 0 | 2+0 | 0 | 0+0 | 0 |
| 2 | DF | (Scotland) SCO | Jason Thomson | 44 | 2 | 33+0 | 2 | 5+0 | 0 | 2+0 | 0 | 4+0 | 0 |
| 3 | DF | (Scotland) SCO | Callum Booth | 46 | 3 | 35+0 | 3 | 5+0 | 0 | 2+0 | 0 | 4+0 | 0 |
| 4 | DF | (Scotland) SCO | Paul Watson | 31 | 1 | 22+0 | 1 | 5+0 | 0 | 2+0 | 0 | 2+0 | 0 |
| 5 | DF | (Scotland) SCO | Dougie Hill | 38 | 4 | 30+0 | 3 | 4+0 | 1 | 2+0 | 0 | 2+0 | 0 |
| 6 | MF | (Scotland) SCO | Liam Fox | 39 | 3 | 27+0 | 0 | 6+0 | 1 | 2+0 | 1 | 4+0 | 1 |
| 7 | MF | (England) ENG | Joe Cardle | 43 | 8 | 33+0 | 5 | 5+0 | 1 | 2+0 | 1 | 3+0 | 1 |
| 8 | MF | (Scotland) SCO | Kevin Moon | 42 | 3 | 30+1 | 1 | 5+0 | 1 | 2+0 | 0 | 4+0 | 1 |
| 9 | FW | (Scotland) SCO | Greig Spence | 36 | 15 | 14+12 | 11 | 2+3 | 3 | 0+1 | 1 | 1+3 | 0 |
| 10 | FW | (Scotland) SCO | Calum Elliot | 40 | 10 | 28+3 | 6 | 5+0 | 2 | 2+0 | 2 | 2+0 | 0 |
| 11 | MF | (Scotland) SCO | Grant Anderson | 42 | 3 | 28+4 | 2 | 4+0 | 0 | 2+0 | 0 | 4+0 | 1 |
| 12 | MF | (Scotland) SCO | Ross Callachan | 33 | 0 | 16+11 | 0 | 0+1 | 0 | 0+2 | 0 | 3+0 | 0 |
| 14 | DF | (Scotland) SCO | Reece Donaldson | 12 | 0 | 8+2 | 0 | 0+1 | 0 | 0+0 | 0 | 1+0 | 0 |
| 15 | FW | (Scotland) SCO | Gordon Smith | 42 | 8 | 17+15 | 6 | 1+3 | 0 | 2+0 | 1 | 4+0 | 1 |
| 16 | DF | (Scotland) SCO | Laurie Ellis | 18 | 0 | 11+2 | 0 | 1+0 | 0 | 0+1 | 0 | 2+1 | 0 |
| 17 | GK | (Scotland) SCO | Ross Laidlaw | 16 | 0 | 12+1 | 0 | 0+0 | 0 | 0+0 | 0 | 3+0 | 0 |
| 18 | DF | (Scotland) SCO | Grant Murray | 0 | 0 | 0+0 | 0 | 0+0 | 0 | 0+0 | 0 | 0+0 | 0 |
| 19 (until January 2014) | DF | (Scotland) SCO | Kevin McCann | 5 | 1 | 1+2 | 1 | 0+0 | 0 | 0+0 | 0 | 1+1 | 0 |
| 19 (from January 2014) | DF | (Scotland) SCO | Fraser Mullen | 12 | 0 | 7+3 | 0 | 0+1 | 0 | 0+0 | 0 | 1+0 | 0 |
| 20 (until February 2014) | GK | (Scotland) SCO | Colin Stewart | 0 | 0 | 0+0 | 0 | 0+0 | 0 | 0+0 | 0 | 0+0 | 0 |
| 20 (from February 2014) | GK | (England) ENG | Lee Robinson | 16 | 0 | 14+0 | 0 | 1+0 | 0 | 0+0 | 0 | 1+0 | 0 |
| 21 | MF | (Scotland) SCO | Lewis Vaughan | 23 | 3 | 5+14 | 2 | 1+0 | 0 | 0+2 | 1 | 0+1 | 0 |
| 22 | FW | (Scotland) SCO | Jamie Watson | 0 | 0 | 0+0 | 0 | 0+0 | 0 | 0+0 | 0 | 0+0 | 0 |
| 23 | MF | (Scotland) SCO | Ross Matthews | 1 | 0 | 0+1 | 0 | 0+0 | 0 | 0+0 | 0 | 0+0 | 0 |
| 24 | MF | (Scotland) SCO | Liam McCroary | 0 | 0 | 0+0 | 0 | 0+0 | 0 | 0+0 | 0 | 0+0 | 0 |
| 25 | FW | (Scotland) SCO | Callum Robertson | 0 | 0 | 0+0 | 0 | 0+0 | 0 | 0+0 | 0 | 0+0 | 0 |
| 26 | DF | (Scotland) SCO | David Bates | 0 | 0 | 0+0 | 0 | 0+0 | 0 | 0+0 | 0 | 0+0 | 0 |
| 27 | GK | (Scotland) SCO | Jordan Roberts | 0 | 0 | 0+0 | 0 | 0+0 | 0 | 0+0 | 0 | 0+0 | 0 |
| 29 | FW | (Scotland) SCO | John Baird | 16 | 8 | 14+1 | 7 | 1+0 | 1 | 0+0 | 0 | 0+0 | 0 |

=== Disciplinary record ===
Includes all competitive matches.

Last updated May 2014

| Nation | Position | Name | Scottish Championship | | Challenge Cup | | League Cup | | Scottish Cup | | Total | |
| Nation | Position | Name | Yellow card | Red card | Yellow card | Red card | Yellow card | Red card | Yellow card | Red card | Yellow card | Red card |
| (Scotland) | GK | Ross Laidlaw | 1 | 0 | 0 | 0 | 0 | 0 | 1 | 0 | 2 | 0 |
| (Scotland) | GK | David McGurn | 0 | 0 | 1 | 0 | 0 | 0 | 0 | 0 | 1 | 0 |
| (Scotland) | GK | Colin Stewart | 0 | 0 | 0 | 0 | 0 | 0 | 0 | 0 | 0 | 0 |
| (England) | GK | Lee Robinson | 2 | 0 | 0 | 0 | 0 | 0 | 0 | 0 | 2 | 0 |
| (Scotland) | DF | Reece Donaldson | 2 | 2 | 0 | 0 | 0 | 0 | 0 | 0 | 2 | 2 |
| (Scotland) | DF | Laurie Ellis | 2 | 0 | 0 | 0 | 0 | 0 | 0 | 0 | 2 | 0 |
| (Scotland) | DF | Dougie Hill | 3 | 2 | 0 | 0 | 0 | 1 | 1 | 0 | 4 | 3 |
| (Scotland) | DF | Grant Murray | 0 | 0 | 0 | 0 | 0 | 0 | 0 | 0 | 0 | 0 |
| (Scotland) | DF | Jason Thomson | 2 | 1 | 1 | 0 | 2 | 0 | 0 | 0 | 5 | 1 |
| (Scotland) | DF | David Bates | 0 | 0 | 0 | 0 | 0 | 0 | 0 | 0 | 0 | 0 |
| (Scotland) | DF | Callum Booth | 4 | 1 | 0 | 0 | 0 | 0 | 2 | 0 | 6 | 1 |
| (Scotland) | DF | Paul Watson | 0 | 0 | 0 | 0 | 1 | 0 | 0 | 0 | 1 | 0 |
| (Scotland) | DF | Kevin McCann | 0 | 0 | 0 | 0 | 0 | 0 | 0 | 0 | 0 | 0 |
| (Scotland) | DF | Fraser Mullen | 2 | 0 | 1 | 0 | 0 | 0 | 0 | 0 | 3 | 0 |
| (Scotland) | MF | Ross Callachan | 2 | 0 | 0 | 0 | 0 | 0 | 1 | 0 | 3 | 0 |
| (Scotland) | MF | Lewis Vaughan | 0 | 0 | 0 | 0 | 0 | 0 | 0 | 0 | 0 | 0 |
| (Scotland) | MF | Grant Anderson | 1 | 0 | 2 | 0 | 0 | 0 | 1 | 0 | 4 | 0 |
| (Scotland) | MF | Kevin Moon | 6 | 0 | 0 | 0 | 0 | 0 | 0 | 0 | 6 | 0 |
| (Scotland) | MF | Ross Matthews | 0 | 0 | 0 | 0 | 0 | 0 | 0 | 0 | 0 | 0 |
| (Scotland) | MF | Liam McCroary | 0 | 0 | 0 | 0 | 0 | 0 | 0 | 0 | 0 | 0 |
| (Scotland) | MF | Liam Fox | 8 | 0 | 1 | 0 | 0 | 0 | 1 | 0 | 10 | 0 |
| (England) | MF | Joe Cardle | 9 | 1 | 1 | 0 | 0 | 0 | 0 | 0 | 10 | 1 |
| (Scotland) | FW | Callum Robertson | 0 | 0 | 0 | 0 | 0 | 0 | 0 | 0 | 0 | 0 |
| (Scotland) | FW | Greig Spence | 0 | 0 | 1 | 0 | 0 | 0 | 1 | 0 | 2 | 0 |
| (Scotland) | FW | Jamie Watson | 0 | 0 | 0 | 0 | 0 | 0 | 0 | 0 | 0 | 0 |
| (Scotland) | FW | Calum Elliot | 7 | 0 | 2 | 0 | 1 | 0 | 0 | 0 | 10 | 0 |
| (Scotland) | FW | Gordon Smith | 5 | 0 | 1 | 0 | 0 | 0 | 0 | 0 | 6 | 0 |
| (Scotland) | FW | John Baird | 1 | 0 | 0 | 0 | 0 | 0 | 0 | 0 | 1 | 0 |

== Team statistics ==
=== League table ===
| Pos | Team | Pld | W | D | L | GF | GA | GD | Pts | Promotion, qualification or relegation |
|---|---|---|---|---|---|---|---|---|---|---|
| 5 | Dumbarton | 36 | 15 | 6 | 15 | 65 | 64 | +1 | 51 | |
| 6 | Livingston | 36 | 13 | 7 | 16 | 51 | 56 | −5 | 46 | |
| 7 | Raith Rovers | 36 | 11 | 9 | 16 | 48 | 61 | −13 | 42 | |
| 8 | Alloa Athletic | 36 | 11 | 7 | 18 | 34 | 51 | −17 | 40 | |
| 9 | Cowdenbeath (O) | 36 | 11 | 7 | 18 | 50 | 72 | −22 | 40 | Qualification for the Championship play-offs |

Source: Soccerway
Rules for classification: 1) points; 2) goal difference; 3) number of goals scored.
(O) Play-off winners

=== Division summary ===
| Round | 1 | 2 | 3 | 4 | 5 | 6 | 7 | 8 | 9 | 10 | 11 | 12 | 13 | 14 | 15 | 16 | 17 | 18 | 19 | 20 | 21 | 22 | 23 | 24 | 25 | 26 | 27 | 28 | 29 | 30 | 31 | 32 | 33 | 34 | 35 | 36 |
|---|---|---|---|---|---|---|---|---|---|---|---|---|---|---|---|---|---|---|---|---|---|---|---|---|---|---|---|---|---|---|---|---|---|---|---|---|
| Ground | H | A | H | A | A | H | H | A | H | A | H | A | A | H | A | H | H | A | H | A | A | H | A | H | A | H | A | H | H | A | A | H | H | A | H | A |
| Result | L | W | D | D | W | W | D | W | W | D | W | L | L | W | L | W | D | L | L | D | L | D | L | L | D | L | D | W | L | L | W | W | L | L | L | L |
| Position | 9 | 5 | 5 | 5 | 3 | 2 | 2 | 2 | 2 | 3 | 3 | 3 | 3 | 3 | 4 | 3 | 3 | 4 | 4 | 4 | 5 | 8 | 6 | 7 | 8 | 8 | 7 | 7 | 8 | 8 | 7 | 7 | 8 | 7 | 7 | 7 |

Updated to match(es) played on 3 May 2014. Source:
A = Away; H = Home; W = Win; D = Draw; L = Loss
