= 2014–15 Raith Rovers F.C. season =

Raith Rovers
2014–15 season
- Chairman: Turnbull Hutton (until 14 November); Alan Young (from 19 December)
- Manager: Grant Murray (Until 27 April); Laurie Ellis (Caretaker)
- Stadium: Stark's Park
- Scottish Championship: Sixth place
- Challenge Cup: First round, lost to Dunfermline Athletic
- League Cup: Second round, lost to Dundee
- Scottish Cup: Quarter-Final, lost to Inverness CT
- Highest home attendance: 6,250
- Lowest home attendance: 788
- Average home league attendance: 2,598
Home colours	Away colours

The 2014–15 season was Raith Rovers' sixth consecutive season in the second tier of Scottish football having been promoted from the Scottish Second Division at the end of the 2008–09 season. Raith Rovers also competed in the Challenge Cup, League Cup and the Scottish Cup.

== Summary ==
=== Management ===
Raith were led by player-manager Grant Murray for the 2014–15 season as with the previous season, having extended his contract in December 2013, until 2016.

== Results & fixtures ==
Win Draw Loss Postponed

=== Preseason ===
9 July 2014 Friendly	Edinburgh City	2–2	Raith Rovers	Meadowbank Stadium
19:30	Gibson 33' (pen.); Allum 41'	Raith Report	Elliot 25' (pen.); Nadé 54'	Attendance: 240; Referee: Stuart

12 July 2014 Friendly	Raith Rovers	1–1	St Johnstone	Stark's Park
15:00	Nadé 7'	Raith Report	Wotherspoon 50'	Attendance: 1,103; Referee: Clancy

15 July 2014 Friendly	Raith Rovers	0–4	York City	Stark's Park
19:45		Raith Report	Coulson 4'; Straker 24', 33'; Hyde 62'	Attendance: 838; Referee: Beaton

19 July 2014 Friendly	Raith Rovers	0–1	Inverness CT	Stark's Park
15:00		Raith Report	Christie 81'	Attendance: 788; Referee: Finnie

=== Scottish Championship ===
9 August 2014 Scottish Championship	Raith Rovers	3–1	Dumbarton	Stark's Park
15:00	Watson 56'; Conroy 78'; Nadé 81'	Raith Report	Agnew 90'	Attendance: 1,642; Referee: Beaton

16 August 2014 Scottish Championship	Alloa Athletic	0–1	Raith Rovers	Recreation Park
15:00		Raith Report	Conroy 4'	Attendance: 858; Referee: Muir

23 August 2014 Championship	Raith Rovers	0–4	Heart of Midlothian	Stark's Park
15:00		Raith Report	Keatings 13', 28', 58'; Oliver 90'	Attendance: 6,105; Referee: Charleston

30 August 2014 Scottish Championship	Cowdenbeath	1–3	Raith Rovers	Central Park
15:00	Milne 90'	Raith Report	Stewart 29'; Vaughan 71'; Conroy 77'	Attendance: 1,216; Referee: Graham

12 September 2014 Scottish Championship	Raith Rovers	0–4	Rangers	Stark's Park
19:45		Raith Report	Clark 16'; Black 38'; Law 39'; McCulloch 73' (pen.)	Attendance: 6,250; Referee: Colvin

20 September 2014 Scottish Championship	Livingston	0–1	Raith Rovers	Almondvale Stadium
15:00		Raith Report	Scott 18'	Attendance: 1,309; Referee: Madden

27 September 2014 Scottish Championship	Raith Rovers	0–0	Falkirk	Stark's Park
15:00		Raith Report		Attendance: 1,871; Referee: Roache

4 October 2014 Scottish Championship	Hibernian	1–1	Raith Rovers	Easter Road
15:00	Robertson 44'	Raith Report	Nadé 68'	Attendance: 9,954; Referee: Beaton

10 October 2014 Scottish Championship	Raith Rovers	3–4	Queen of the South	Stark's Park
19:35	Stewart 59', 78'; Nadé 62'	Raith Report	Baird 7'; Reilly 50'; Holt (red card) 73'; Lyle 74'; Russell 90'	Attendance: 1,552; Referee: Muir

18 October 2014 Scottish Championship	Rangers	6–1	Raith Rovers	Ibrox Stadium
15:00	McCulloch 8'; Law 36'; Miller 55'; Boyd 63'; Daly 84', 90'	Raith Report	Scott 54'	Attendance: 33,956; Referee: Robertson

25 October 2014 Scottish Championship	Raith Rovers	1–1	Alloa Athletic	Stark's Park
15:00	Anderson 34'	Raith Report	Buchanan 14'; Benedictus (yellow card) 81' (red card)	Attendance: 1,541; Referee: Anderson

8 November 2014 Scottish Championship	Hearts	1–0	Raith Rovers	Tynecastle Stadium
15:00	Öztürk 5'	Raith Report		Attendance: 16,372; Referee: Allan

15 November 2014 Scottish Championship	Raith Rovers	2–1	Cowdenbeath	Stark's Park
15:00	Moon 58'; Nadé 71'	Raith Report	Oyenuga 35'	Attendance: 1,779; Referee: Colvin

22 November 2014 Scottish Championship	Queen of the South	2–0	Raith Rovers	Palmerston Park
17:30	Baird 22'; Reilly 80'	Raith Report		Attendance: 1,597; Referee: Finnie

6 December 2014 Scottish Championship	Raith Rovers	1–5	Livingston	Stark's Park
15:00	Perry (red card) 2'; Anderson 45'	Raith Report	White 3' (pen.); Burchill 23'; Glen 44'; Mullen 78'; McKenna 88'	Attendance: 1,385; Referee: Allan

13 December 2014 Scottish Championship	Dumbarton	2–1	Raith Rovers	Dumbarton Football Stadium
15:00	Agnew 20', 88' (pen.)	Raith Report	Stewart 63'	Attendance: 764; Referee: Madden

20 December 2014 Scottish Championship	Raith Rovers	1–3	Hibernian	Stark's Park
15:00	McKay 40'	Raith Report	Cummings 44'; Fontaine 78'; Malonga 81'	Attendance: 3,166; Referee: Robertson

27 December 2014 Scottish Championship	Falkirk	0–1	Raith Rovers	Falkirk Stadium
17:30		Raith Report	Conroy 79'	Attendance: 3,358; Referee: Dallas

3 January 2015 Scottish Championship	Cowdenbeath	0–1	Raith Rovers	Central Park
15:00		Raith Report	Nadé 89'	Attendance: 1,265; Referee: Robertson

17 January 2015 Scottish Championship	Raith Rovers	2–1	Dumbarton	Stark's Park
15:00	Conroy 29' (pen.); Anderson 32'	Raith Report	Megginson 81'	Attendance: 1,474; Referee: McKendrick

24 January 2015 Scottish Championship	Alloa Athletic	0–0	Raith Rovers	Recreation Park
15:00		Raith Report		Attendance: 914; Referee: Graham

31 January 2015 Scottish Championship	Hibernian	1–1	Raith Rovers	Easter Road
15:00	Boyle 46'	Raith Report	Nadé 90'	Attendance: 9,024; Referee: Anderson

14 February 2015 Scottish Championship	Raith Rovers	2–2	Falkirk	Stark's Park
15:00	Vaulks 60' (o.g.); Callachan 90'	Raith Report	Baird 23' (pen.); McCracken 68'	Attendance: 2,092; Referee: Cook

20 February 2015 Scottish Championship	Raith Rovers	1–2	Rangers	Stark's Park
19:45	Conroy 70'	Raith Report	Murdoch 35'; Boyd 54'	Attendance: 4,604; Referee: Charleston

28 February 2015 Scottish Championship	Livingston	0–2	Raith Rovers	Almondvale Stadium
15:00		Raith Report	Callachan 15'; Vaughan 21'	Attendance: 972; Referee: Robertson

14 March 2015 Scottish Championship	Queen of the South	2–1	Raith Rovers	Palmerston Park
15:00	Russell 9'; Reilly 39'	Raith Report	Vaughan 20'	Attendance: 1,656; Referee: Graham

17 March 2015 Scottish Championship	Raith Rovers	1–3	Hearts	Stark's Park
19:45	Barr 43'; Nadé (red card) 65'	Raith Report	McHattie 27'; Walker 79'; King 85'	Attendance: 4,760; Referee: Salmond

21 March 2015 Scottish Championship	Raith Rovers	2–1	Alloa Athletic	Stark's Park
17:30	Stewart 29'; Vaughan 47'	Raith Report	Buchanan 33'	Attendance: 1,100; Referee: Colvin

24 March 2015 Scottish Championship	Raith Rovers	3–0	Queen of the South	Stark's Park
19:45	Stewart 23', 78'; Vaughan 82'	Raith Report		Attendance: 1,152; Referee: Charleston

28 March 2015 Scottish Championship	Raith Rovers	2–1	Hibernian	Stark's Park
15:00	Stewart 53'; Vaughan 84'	Raith Report	Fyvie 56'	Attendance: 3,183; Referee: Muir

4 April 2015 Scottish Championship	Falkirk	1–0	Raith Rovers	Falkirk Stadium
15:00	Vaulks 62'	Raith Report	Fox (red card) 45'	Attendance: 4,032; Referee: Robertson

8 April 2015 Scottish Championship	Raith Rovers	1–3	Cowdenbeath	Stark's Park
19:45	Stewart 88'	Raith Report	Nish 33', 61', 80'	Attendance: 1,350; Referee: McKendrick

12 April 2015 Scottish Championship	Rangers	4–0	Raith Rovers	Ibrox Stadium
15:00	Clark 6'; Vučkić 27'; Law 72', 88'	Raith Report		Attendance: 31,427; Referee: Finnie

18 April 2015 Scottish Championship	Hearts	2–1	Raith Rovers	Tynecastle Stadium
15:00	Nicholson 34'; El Hassnaoui 56'	Raith Report	Elliot 66'	Attendance: 15,405; Referee: Collum

25 April 2015 Scottish Championship	Raith Rovers	0–4	Livingston	Stark's Park
15:00		Raith Report	Fordyce 19'; Sives 49'; Mullen 55'; Barr 71' (o.g.)	Attendance: 1,766; Referee: Graham

2 May 2015 Scottish Championship	Dumbarton	2–2	Raith Rovers	Dumbarton Football Stadium
12:15	Kirkpatrick 21'; Agnew 78'	Raith Report	Stewart 53'; Vaughan 60'	Attendance: 801; Referee: Northcroft

=== Scottish Challenge Cup ===
26 July 2014 Round 1	Dunfermline Athletic	P – P	Raith Rovers	East End Park
15:00		BBC Report		Referee: McLean
Note: Postponed due to a waterlogged pitch.

5 August 2014 Round 1	Dunfermline Athletic	1–0	Raith Rovers	East End Park
19:45	Millen 82'	Raith Report		Attendance: 4,230; Referee: Muir

=== Scottish League Cup ===
2 August 2014 Round 1	Raith Rovers	4 – 2 (a.e.t.)	Forfar Athletic	Stark's Park
15:00	Conroy 34'; Elliot 65' (pen.), 103'; Young 118' (o.g.)	Raith Report	Denholm 25', 75'	Attendance: 1,143; Referee: Colvin

26 August 2014 Round 2	Dundee	4–0	Raith Rovers	Dens Park
19:45	Stewart 3'; McGinn 43'; MacDonald 59'; Boyle 70'	Raith Report		Attendance: 2,645; Referee: Clancy

=== Scottish Cup ===
1 November 2014 Round 3	Linlithgow Rose	0–2	Raith Rovers	Prestonfield
14:00		Raith Report	Conroy 68' (pen.); Watson 86'	Attendance: 2,250; Referee: McKendrick

29 November 2014 Round 4	Stirling Albion	0–2	Raith Rovers	Forthbank Stadium
15:00		Raith Report	McKay 44'; Anderson 54'	Attendance: 912; Referee: Aitken

8 February 2015 Round 5	Rangers	1–2	Raith Rovers	Ibrox Stadium
15:00	Vučkić 62'	Raith Report	Conroy 54'; Nadé 75'	Attendance: 11,422; Referee: Madden

10 March 2015 Quarter-Final	Inverness CT	1–0	Raith Rovers	Caledonian Stadium
19:45	Devine 63'	Raith Report		Attendance: 2,276; Referee: Allan

=== Fife Cup ===
12 August 2014 Fife Cup	Burntisland Shipyard	1–2	Raith Rovers	Recreation Park
19:00	McPhail 4'	Burntisland Shipyard Report	Robertson 27'; Callachan 33'	Referee: Lambie

== Player statistics ==
=== Captain ===
No.	P	Name	Country	No. games	Notes
2	DF	Jason Thomson	(Scotland)	43	Club captain

Last updated: 2 May 2015
Source: Competitive match reports.
Competitive matches only
Matches started as captain only
Country: FIFA nationality; No.: Squad number; P: Position; Name: Player name; No. Games: Number of games started as captain.

=== Squad ===
Last updated 2 May 2015

No.	Pos	Nat	Player	Total		Scottish Championship		Challenge Cup		League Cup		Scottish Cup	
No.	Pos	Nat	Player	Apps	Goals	Apps	Goals	Apps	Goals	Apps	Goals	Apps	Goals
1	GK	(Scotland) SCO	Kevin Cuthbert	10	0	7+0	0	1+0	0	2+0	0	0+0	0
2	DF	(Scotland) SCO	Jason Thomson	43	0	36+0	0	1+0	0	2+0	0	4+0	0
3	DF	(Scotland) SCO	Ross Perry	16	0	10+1	0	1+0	0	2+0	0	2+0	0
4	DF	(Scotland) SCO	Paul Watson	43	2	36+0	1	1+0	0	2+0	0	4+0	1
5	DF	(Scotland) SCO	Dougie Hill	12	0	10+1	0	0+0	0	0+0	0	1+0	0
6	MF	(Scotland) SCO	Liam Fox	29	0	22+3	0	1+0	0	1+0	0	2+0	0
7	MF	(Scotland) SCO	Grant Anderson	37	4	22+9	3	0+0	0	0+2	0	4+0	1
8	MF	(Scotland) SCO	Kevin Moon	27	1	18+5	1	0+0	0	1+0	0	2+1	0
9	FW	(Scotland) SCO	Mark Stewart	41	10	26+8	10	1+0	0	2+0	0	3+1	0
10	FW	(Scotland) SCO	Calum Elliot	18	3	11+5	1	0+0	0	1+0	2	1+0	0
11	MF	(Scotland) SCO	Martin Scott	32	2	21+5	2	1+0	0	2+0	0	2+1	0
12	MF	(Scotland) SCO	Ross Callachan	31	2	21+4	2	0+1	0	0+2	0	2+1	0
14	MF	(Scotland) SCO	Ryan Conroy	42	9	29+6	6	1+0	0	2+0	1	2+2	2
16	MF	(Scotland) SCO	Lewis Vaughan	26	7	12+9	7	1+0	0	1+1	0	0+2	0
17	GK	(Scotland) SCO	Ross Laidlaw	7	0	7+0	0	0+0	0	0+0	0	0+0	0
18	FW	(Scotland) SCO	Dale Carrick	2	0	0+1	0	0+0	0	0+0	0	1+0	0
19	MF	(Scotland) SCO	Barrie McKay	25	2	16+7	1	0+0	0	0+0	0	2+0	1
20	GK	(Scotland) SCO	David McGurn	26	0	22+0	0	0+0	0	0+0	0	4+0	0
23	DF	(Northern Ireland) NIR	Rory McKeown	43	0	36+0	0	1+0	0	2+0	0	4+0	0
24	DF	(Scotland) SCO	Laurie Ellis	7	0	5+1	0	0+0	0	0+1	0	0+0	0
25	DF	(Scotland) SCO	Grant Murray	0	0	0+0	0	0+0	0	0+0	0	0+0	0
27	FW	(France) FRA	Christian Nadé	33	7	16+11	6	1+0	0	2+0	0	3+0	1
29	MF	(Scotland) SCO	Liam McCroary	0	0	0+0	0	0+0	0	0+0	0	0+0	0
30	FW	(Scotland) SCO	Callum Robertson	1	0	0+1	0	0+0	0	0+0	0	0+0	0
31	MF	(Scotland) SCO	Ross Matthews	1	0	1+0	0	0+0	0	0+0	0	0+0	0
32	DF	(Scotland) SCO	David Bates	0	0	0+0	0	0+0	0	0+0	0	0+0	0
33	MF	(Scotland) SCO	Kieran Campbell	0	0	0+0	0	0+0	0	0+0	0	0+0	0
34	FW	(Scotland) SCO	Jonny Court	0	0	0+0	0	0+0	0	0+0	0	0+0	0
35	GK	(Scotland) SCO	Scott Law	0	0	0+0	0	0+0	0	0+0	0	0+0	0
36	DF	(Scotland) SCO	Elliot Ford	0	0	0+0	0	0+0	0	0+0	0	0+0	0
55	DF	(Scotland) SCO	Craig Barr	13	1	12+0	1	0+0	0	0+0	0	1+0	0

=== Disciplinary record ===
Includes all competitive matches.

Last updated May 2015

Nation	Position	Name	Scottish Championship		Challenge Cup		League Cup		Scottish Cup		Total	
Nation	Position	Name	Booked	Sent off (straight red)	Booked	Sent off (straight red)	Booked	Sent off (straight red)	Booked	Sent off (straight red)	Booked	Sent off (straight red)
(Scotland)	GK	Ross Laidlaw	0	0	0	0	0	0	0	0	0	0
(Scotland)	GK	David McGurn	0	0	0	0	0	0	0	0	0	0
(Scotland)	GK	Kevin Cuthbert	0	0	0	0	0	0	0	0	0	0
(Scotland)	GK	Scott Law	0	0	0	0	0	0	0	0	0	0
(Scotland)	DF	Laurie Ellis	0	0	0	0	0	0	0	0	0	0
(Scotland)	DF	Dougie Hill	3	0	0	0	0	0	0	0	3	0
(Scotland)	DF	Grant Murray	0	0	0	0	0	0	0	0	0	0
(Scotland)	DF	Jason Thomson	4	0	0	0	1	0	1	0	6	0
(Scotland)	DF	David Bates	0	0	0	0	0	0	0	0	0	0
(Scotland)	DF	Paul Watson	5	0	0	0	0	0	0	0	5	0
(Scotland)	DF	Craig Barr	3	0	0	0	0	0	0	0	3	0
(Northern Ireland)	DF	Rory McKeown	0	0	0	0	0	0	0	0	0	0
(Scotland)	DF	Ross Perry	0	1	1	0	1	0	2	0	4	1
(Scotland)	DF	Elliot Ford	0	0	0	0	0	0	0	0	0	0
(Scotland)	MF	Ross Callachan	6	0	0	0	0	0	0	0	6	0
(Scotland)	MF	Lewis Vaughan	1	0	0	0	0	0	0	0	1	0
(Scotland)	MF	Grant Anderson	2	0	0	0	1	0	0	0	3	0
(Scotland)	MF	Kevin Moon	5	0	0	0	1	0	0	0	6	0
(Scotland)	MF	Ross Matthews	0	0	0	0	0	0	0	0	0	0
(Scotland)	MF	Liam McCroary	0	0	0	0	0	0	0	0	0	0
(Scotland)	MF	Liam Fox	3	1	0	0	0	0	0	0	3	1
(Scotland)	MF	Martin Scott	7	0	1	0	0	0	2	0	10	0
(Scotland)	MF	Kieran Campbell	0	0	0	0	0	0	0	0	0	0
(Scotland)	MF	Ryan Conroy	0	0	0	0	0	0	0	0	0	0
(Scotland)	MF	Barrie McKay	1	0	0	0	0	0	0	0	1	0
(Scotland)	FW	Callum Robertson	0	0	0	0	0	0	0	0	0	0
(Scotland)	FW	Calum Elliot	1	0	0	0	1	0	0	0	2	0
(France)	FW	Christian Nadé	6	1	0	0	0	0	0	0	6	1
(Scotland)	FW	Jonny Court	0	0	0	0	0	0	0	0	0	0
(Scotland)	FW	Mark Stewart	1	0	0	0	0	0	0	0	1	0
(Scotland)	FW	Dale Carrick	0	0	0	0	0	0	0	0	0	0

== Team statistics ==
=== League table ===
Pos	Team	Pld	W	D	L	GF	GA	GD	Pts	Promotion, qualification or relegation
4	Queen of the South	36	17	9	10	58	41	+17	60	Qualification for the Premiership play-off quarter-final
5	Falkirk	36	14	11	11	48	48	0	53	
6	Raith Rovers	36	12	7	17	42	65	−23	43	
7	Dumbarton	36	9	7	20	36	79	−43	34	
8	Livingston (Note: Livingston were deducted 5 points due to failure of tax payments.)	36	8	8	20	41	53	−12	27	

Source: Soccerway
Rules for classification: 1) Points; 2) Goal difference; 3) Number of goals scored

=== Division summary ===
Round	1	2	3	4	5	6	7	8	9	10	11	12	13	14	15	16	17	18	19	20	21	22	23	24	25	26	27	28	29	30	31	32	33	34	35	36
Ground	H	A	H	A	H	A	H	A	H	A	H	A	H	A	H	A	H	A	A	H	H	A	A	H	H	A	H	A	H	H	A	H	A	A	H	A
Result	W	W	L	W	L	W	D	D	L	L	D	L	W	L	L	L	L	W	W	W	W	D	D	D	L	W	L	L	W	W	L	L	L	L	L	D
Position	1	2	4	3	3	3	3	3	4	5	4	5	5	5	6	7	7	7	6	6	6	6	6	6	6	6	6	6	6	6	6	6	6	6	6	6

Updated to match(es) played on 2 May 2015. Source:
A = Away; H = Home; W = Win; D = Draw; L = Loss

=== Management statistics ===
Last updated on 2 May 2015

Name	From	To	P	W	D	L	Win% (Note: Win% is the percentage of matches won rounded to two decimal places.)
Grant Murray	26 July 2014	Present	43	16	6	21	37.21
