= 2013–14 Scottish Challenge Cup =

Tournament details
- Country: Scotland
- Teams: 33

Final positions
- Champions: Raith Rovers
- Runners-up: Rangers

Tournament statistics
- Matches played: 33
- Goals scored: 103 (3.12 per match)

The 2013–14 Scottish Challenge Cup, known as the Ramsdens Challenge Cup due to sponsorship reasons with Ramsdens, was the 23rd season of the competition. It was contested by 32 clubs, which included the 30 members of the 2013–14 Scottish Championship-League Two, the top Highland League club with a valid SFA club licence (Formartine United) and the winner of a preliminary round tie between the highest placed top in the East of Scotland League with a valid SFA club licence (Spartans) and their counterparts in the South of Scotland League (Threave Rovers), the preliminary tie was a two-legged tie played on the Saturdays of 13 and 20 July with Spartans at home in the 1st leg. Spartans came out on top.

The defending champions were Queen of the South, who defeated Partick Thistle in the 2013 final; and lost 3–0 to Rangers in the Quarter final.

Raith Rovers won the trophy with a late winner by John Baird against Rangers at Easter Road in Edinburgh.

== Schedule ==
Round	First match date	Fixtures	Clubs
Preliminary round	Sat 13/20 July 2013	2	33 → 32
First round	Sat 27 July 2013	16	32 → 16
Second round	Tue 20/Wed 21 August 2013	8	16 → 8
Quarter-finals	Saturday 7 September 2013	4	8 → 4
Semi-finals	Sunday 13 October 2013	2	4 → 2
Final	Sunday 6 April 2014	1	2 → 1

== Fixtures and results ==
=== Preliminary round ===
Team 1	Agg.	Team 2	1st leg	2nd leg
Spartans	4–3	Threave Rovers	4–2	0–1

First leg

13 July 2013
15:00

Spartans	4–2	Threave Rovers
Ross 48', 55'; Motion 85'; Anderson 90'	BBC Sport	Milligan 71'; Wilby 77' (pen.)

Ainslie Park, Edinburgh
Attendance: 321
Referee: Walsh

Second leg

20 July 2013
15:00

Threave Rovers	1–0	Spartans
Fyfe 75'	BBC Sport

Meadow Park, Castle Douglas
Attendance: 252
Referee: Graham

=== First round ===
The first round draw took place on Friday 28 June 2013 at 11am BST at Hampden Park.

==== North and East Region ====
27 July 2013	Formartine United	2–0	East Stirlingshire	North Lodge Park, Pitmedden
15:00	Park 26'; Keith 42'	Report		Attendance: 186; Referee: Steven

27 July 2013	Stenhousemuir	4 – 4 (a.e.t.) (3–2 p)	Arbroath	Ochilview Park, Stenhousemuir
15:00	Higgins 25'; Gemmell 68', 119' (pen.); Douglas 97'; Devlin (yellow card) 104' (red card)	Report	Linn 21'; Banjo 36'; Milne 95', 120'	Attendance: 280; Referee: Somers

27 July 2013	Forfar Athletic	2–1	East Fife	Station Park, Forfar
15:00	Kader 25'; Malcolm 30'	Report	Buchanan 40' (pen.)	Attendance: 545; Referee: Dallas

27 July 2013	Elgin City	2–0	Montrose	Borough Briggs, Elgin
15:00	Gunn 57'; Sutherland 84'	Report		Attendance: 505; Referee: Cook

27 July 2013	Cowdenbeath	1–3	Dunfermline Athletic	Central Park, Cowdenbeath
15:00	Wedderburn 15'; Milne (red card) 85'	Report	Morris 36'; Ferguson 64'; Thomson 80'	Attendance: 1,161; Referee: Madden

27 July 2013	Peterhead	2–1	Brechin City	Balmoor Stadium, Peterhead
15:00	Cox 8'; Brown 73'	Report	Strachan 45' (o.g.)	Attendance: 546; Referee: Roache

27 July 2013	Alloa Athletic	0–1	Dundee	Recreation Park, Alloa
15:00		Report	Monti 60' (pen.)	Referee: Clancy

27 July 2013	Raith Rovers	2–1	Stirling Albion	Stark's Park, Kirkcaldy
15:00	Moon 74'; Cardle 90'	Report	White 88' (pen.)	Attendance: 1,111; Referee: Norris

==== South and West Region ====
27 July 2013	Annan Athletic	1–0	Greenock Morton	Galabank, Annan
15:00	Weatherson 71'	Report		Attendance: 732; Referee: Allan

27 July 2013	Berwick Rangers	3 – 2 (a.e.t.)	Livingston	Shielfield Park, Berwick-upon-Tweed
15:00	Gray 26'; Morris 99'; Ronald 105'	Report	McNulty 90'; Talbot (red card) 94'; Mensing 105' (pen.)	Attendance: 460; Referee: Salmond

27 July 2013	Queen's Park	1–2	Ayr United	Hampden Park, Glasgow
15:00	Quinn 28' (pen.)	Report	Moffat 53'; Forrest 89'	Attendance: 887; Referee: P.Robertson

27 July 2013	Queen of the South	4–0	Spartans	Palmerston Park, Dumfries
15:00	McKenna 12', 23'; Lyle 18'; Holt 68'	Report		Attendance: 1,224; Referee: D.Robertson

27 July 2013	Clyde	1–2	Falkirk	Broadwood Stadium, Cumbernauld
15:00	McCluskey 61'	Report	Alston 49'; McGrandles 64'	Attendance: 935; Referee: Brines

27 July 2013	Stranraer	4–2	Dumbarton	Stair Park, Stranraer
15:00	Winter 10'; Grehan 67'; Aitken 83', 88' (pen.)	Report	Fleming 26'; Smith 45'	Attendance: 333; Referee: McKendrick

27 July 2013	Airdrieonians	2–1	Hamilton Academical	Excelsior Stadium, Airdrie
15:00	McLaren 24'; Blockley 59'	Report	Longridge 18'	Referee: Murray

28 July 2013	Albion Rovers	0–4	Rangers	Almondvale Stadium, Livingston
16:05		Report	Trialist 26', 44'; Black 71'; Templeton 74'	Attendance: 5,345; Referee: Beaton

=== Second round ===
The second round draw took place on Wednesday 31 July 2013 at 3pm BST at the Ramsdens store in Clydebank.

==== North and East Region ====
20 August 2013	Peterhead	1 – 3 (a.e.t.)	Stenhousemuir	Balmoor Stadium, Peterhead
19:30	Cox 26'	Report	Gemmell 63'; R.Smith (yellow card) 90' (red card); D.Smith 93'; McNeil 120'	Attendance: 427; Referee: Northcroft

20 August 2013	Dundee	3 – 1 (a.e.t.)	Forfar Athletic	Dens Park, Dundee
19:45	McBride 80'; MacDonald 97', 120'	Report	Malcolm 52'	Attendance: 2,052; Referee: Allan

20 August 2013	Dunfermline Athletic	0 –2	Raith Rovers	East End Park, Dunfermline
19:45		Report	Hill 2'; Fox 64' (pen.)	Attendance: 3,765; Referee: Aitken

21 August 2013	Formartine United	5–1	Elgin City	North Lodge Park, Pitmedden
19:30	Ewen 15'; Keith 52' (pen.), 57', 61'; McKeown 90'	Report	Crighton 6', (red card) 52'	Attendance: 480; Referee: Somers

==== South and West Region ====
20 August 2013	Stranraer	2–3	Annan Athletic	Stair Park, Stranraer
19:45	Aitken 41' (pen.); Grehan 85'	Report	Mackay 19', 36'; Hopkirk 86'	Attendance: 290; Referee: O'Reilly

20 August 2013	Ayr United	1 – 2 (a.e.t.)	Falkirk	Somerset Park, Ayr
19:45	Malcolm 41'	Report	Loy 62'; Shepherd 111'	Attendance: 921; Referee: Charleston

20 August 2013	Airdrieonians	0 –2	Queen of the South	Excelsior Stadium, Airdrie
19:45		Report	Lyle 45+1', 64'	Attendance: 637; Referee: McKendrick

27 August 2013	Rangers	2–0	Berwick Rangers	Ibrox Stadium, Glasgow
19:45	McKay 60'; Little 62'	Report		Attendance: 16,097; Referee: Norris

=== Quarter-finals ===
The quarter-final draw took place on Thursday 22 August 2013 at 2pm BST at Hampden Park in Glasgow.

7 September 2013	Raith Rovers	1–0	Falkirk	Stark's Park, Kirkcaldy
15:00	Spence 86'	Report		Attendance: 1,565; Referee: Allan

7 September 2013	Dundee	1 – 1 (a.e.t.) (4–5 p)	Stenhousemuir	Dens Park, Dundee
15:00	MacDonald 52' (pen.)	Report	Higgins 63'	Attendance: 1,615; Referee: McKendrick

7 September 2013	Annan Athletic	4–0	Formartine United	Galabank, Annan
15:00	Love 53' (pen.); Brannan 73'; MacKay 79'; Hopkirk 86'	Report		Attendance: 506; Referee: Anderson

17 September 2013	Queen of the South	0–3	Rangers	Palmerston Park, Dumfries
19:45	Higgins (yellow card) 75' (red card)	Report	Mohsni 7'; Daly 75'; McCulloch 83'	Attendance: 6,155; Referee: Murray

=== Semi-finals ===
The semi-final draw took place on Thursday 19 September 2013 at 2pm BST at Hampden Park in Glasgow.

13 October 2013	Raith Rovers	3–0	Annan Athletic	Stark's Park, Kirkcaldy
16:05	Weatherson 1' (o.g.); Elliot 73', 89'	Report		Attendance: 2,119; Referee: Clancy

29 October 2013	Stenhousemuir	0–1	Rangers	Ochilview Park, Stenhousemuir
19:35		Report	Daly 75'	Attendance: 2,338; Referee: Madden

=== Final ===
6 April 2014	Raith Rovers	1–0	Rangers	Easter Road, Edinburgh
16:05	Baird 116'	Report		Attendance: 19,983; Referee: Kevin Clancy
