= 2014–15 Scottish Challenge Cup =

- Petrofac Training Cup

Tournament details
- Country: Scotland
- Teams: 32

Final positions
- Champions: Livingston
- Runners-up: Alloa Athletic

Tournament statistics
- Matches played: 31
- Goals scored: 112 (3.61 per match)

The 2014–15 Scottish Challenge Cup, known as the Petrofac Training Cup due to sponsorship reasons with Petrofac, was the 24th season of the competition. It was competed for by 32 clubs, which included the 30 members of the 2014–15 Scottish Championship-League Two, the top Highland League club with a valid SFA club licence (Brora Rangers) and the highest placed team from the previous season in the Lowland League with a valid SFA club licence (Spartans).

The defending champions were Raith Rovers, who had defeated Rangers in the 2014 final. Raith were eliminated 1–0 by Dunfermline Athletic in the first round of the North Section.

== Schedule ==
Round	First match date	Fixtures	Clubs
First round	Sat 26 July 2014	16	32 → 16
Second round	Tue 19/Wed 20 August 2014	8	16 → 8
Quarter-finals	Saturday 6 September 2014	4	8 → 4
Semi-finals	Sunday 12 October 2014	2	4 → 2
Final	Sunday 5 April 2015	1	2 → 1

== Fixtures and results ==
=== First round ===
The first round draw took place on Wednesday 2 July 2014 at 2pm BST at Easter Road.

==== North Section ====
26 July 2014	Arbroath	1 – 4	Alloa Athletic	Gayfield Park, Arbroath
15:00	Tiffoney 90' (o.g.)	Report	Simmons 9'; Spence 54', 70', 83'	Attendance: 560; Referee: Don Robertson

26 July 2014	East Fife	2 – 1	Forfar Athletic	Bayview Stadium, Methil
15:00	McShane 14'; Moyes 42'	Report	Hilson 72'	Attendance: 449; Referee: Alan Newlands

26 July 2014	Montrose	0 – 3	Peterhead	Links Park, Montrose
15:00	Webster (red card) 34'; Wood (red card) 50'	Report	Rodgers 6'; McAllister 17'; Stevenson 28'	Attendance: 347; Referee: Colin Steven

26 July 2014	Elgin City	0 – 3	Stirling Albion	Borough Briggs, Elgin
15:00	Cooper (red card) 58'	Report	G. Smith 48', 58' (pen.), 78'	Attendance: 470; Referee: Nick Walsh

26 July 2014	Cowdenbeath	1 – 3 (a.e.t.)	Brechin City	Central Park, Cowdenbeath
15:00	Higgins 13'	Report	Thomson 64'; Trouten 93'; Ferguson 108'	Attendance: 294; Referee: Gavin Duncan

26 July 2014	East Stirlingshire	1 – 7	Falkirk	Ochilview Park, Stenhousemuir
15:00	McKenna 71'	Report	Vaulks 29'; Cooper 62'; Loy 66' (pen.), 73'; Bia-Bi 81'; Alston 85', 88'	Attendance: 933; Referee: Andrew Dallas

26 July 2014	Brora Rangers	3 – 1 (a.e.t.)	Stenhousemuir	Dudgeon Park, Brora
15:00	Sutherland 32', 92', 104'	Report	Grehan 52' (pen.)	Attendance: 250; Referee: Mat Northcroft

5 August 2014	Dunfermline Athletic	1 – 0	Raith Rovers	East End Park, Dunfermline
19:45	Millen 82'	Report		Attendance: 4,230; Referee: Alan Muir

==== South Section ====
25 July 2014	Queen's Park	1 – 1 (a.e.t.) (3 – 4 p)	Berwick Rangers	Excelsior Stadium, Airdrie
19:45	McPherson 33'; Fraser (yellow card) 91' (red card)	Report	Lavery 3'	Attendance: 245; Referee: Kevin Graham

26 July 2014	Stranraer	3 – 2	Dumbarton	Stair Park, Stranraer
15:00	McKeown 65', 77'; Winter 90+4'	Report	Kirkpatrick 4'; Gilhaney 45'	Attendance: 355; Referee: Des Roache

26 July 2014	Heart of Midlothian	3 – 1	Annan Athletic	Tynecastle Stadium, Edinburgh
15:00	King 8'; Sow 18'; Paterson 39'	Report	Davidson 90'	Attendance: 6,708; Referee: Calum Murray

26 July 2014	Airdrieonians	2 – 2 (a.e.t.) (2 – 4 p)	Albion Rovers	Excelsior Stadium, Airdrie
15:00	Watt 5'; Blockley 62'	Report	Love 39'; Gemmell 87'	Attendance: 851; Referee: Bobby Madden

26 July 2014	Queen of the South	3 – 4 (a.e.t.)	Livingston	Palmerston Park, Dumfries
15:00	Dowie 25'; Russell 56'; Paton 107'	Report	Sives 57'; Mullen 64'; Hippolyte 98'; Robertson 115'	Attendance: 1,196; Referee: Craig Charleston

26 July 2014	Greenock Morton	1 – 0	Spartans	Cappielow, Greenock
15:00	O'Neil 27'	Report		Attendance: 928; Referee: Gavin Ross

26 July 2014	Clyde	2 – 0	Ayr United	Broadwood Stadium, Cumbernauld
15:00	McManus 8'; Sweeney 29' (pen.)	Report		Attendance: 689; Referee: Stephen Finnie

5 August 2014	Rangers	2 – 1 (a.e.t.)	Hibernian	Ibrox Stadium, Glasgow
19:35	MacLeod 14'; Law 101'	Report	Handling 59' (red card) 108'	Attendance: 18,138; Referee: John Beaton

=== Second round ===
The second round draw took place on Tuesday 29 July 2014 at 3:30pm BST at the Petrofac Training base in Aberdeen.

==== North Section ====
19 August 2014	Brora Rangers	2 – 3	East Fife	Dudgeon Park, Brora
19:30	MacKay 29'; Sutherland 38'	Report	McShane 34' (pen.), 42'; Austin 86'	Attendance: 395; Referee: John McKendrick

19 August 2014	Dunfermline Athletic	1 – 2	Falkirk	East End Park, Dunfermline
19:45	Geggan 68'	Report	Taiwo 55', 60'; Biabi (red card) 75'	Attendance: 2,810; Referee: George Salmond

19 August 2014	Brechin City	0 – 2	Peterhead	Glebe Park, Brechin
19:45		Report	Redman 8'; Noble 58'	Attendance: 328; Referee: Craig Charleston

19 August 2014	Stirling Albion	1 – 2	Alloa Athletic	Forthbank Stadium, Stirling
19:45	D.Smith 82'	Report	Spence 49', 69'	Attendance: 537; Referee: Euan Anderson

==== South Section ====
18 August 2014	Rangers	8 – 1	Clyde	Ibrox Stadium, Glasgow
19:35	Boyd 16', 33', 79'; Aird 24'; McCulloch 38', 77'; MacLeod 45', 65'	Report	Watt 90'	Attendance: 11,190; Referee: Andrew Dallas

19 August 2014	Greenock Morton	5 – 2 (a.e.t.)	Berwick Rangers	Cappielow, Greenock
19:45	J.McCluskey 14', (yellow card) 119' (red card); O'Ware 45'; McManus 105', 114', 117'	Report	Maxwell 9'; L.Currie 90'	Attendance: 906; Referee: Barry Cook

19 August 2014	Stranraer	2 – 1	Albion Rovers	Stair Park, Stranraer
19:45	Malcolm 19'; Rumsby 37'	Report	Gemmell 72' (pen.)	Attendance: 236; Referee: Stephen Finnie

20 August 2014	Livingston	4 – 1	Heart of Midlothian	Almondvale Stadium, Livingston
19:45	White 6', 76'; Hippolyte 81'; Robertson 84'	Report	Talbot 90' (o.g.)	Attendance: 3,807; Referee: Crawford Allan

=== Quarter-finals ===
The quarter-final draw took place on Thursday 21 August 2014 at 2pm BST at Lesser Hampden in Glasgow.

6 September 2014	Greenock Morton	0 – 1	Alloa Athletic	Cappielow, Greenock
15:00		Report	McCord 89'	Attendance: 1,273; Referee: Des Roache

6 September 2014	Stranraer	1 – 0	Falkirk	Stair Park, Stranraer
15:00	Marenghi 41'	Report		Attendance: 551; Referee: Euan Anderson

6 September 2014	Peterhead	0 – 1 (a.e.t.)	Livingston	Balmoor Stadium, Peterhead
15:00	Rodgers (red card) 120'	Report	Hippolyte 113'	Attendance: 695; Referee: Brian Colvin

21 October 2014	East Fife	0 – 2	Rangers	Bayview Stadium, Methil
19:45		Report	Daly 29'; Black 57'	Attendance: 1,827; Referee: George Salmond

=== Semi-finals ===
The semi-final draw took place on Tuesday 9 September 2014 at 2pm BST at Hampden Park in Glasgow.

12 October 2014	Livingston	1 – 1 (a.e.t.) (5 – 4 p)	Stranraer	Almondvale Stadium, Livingston
16:05	Glen 66'	Report	Longworth 45'	Attendance: 845; Referee: George Salmond

3 December 2014	Alloa Athletic	3 – 2	Rangers	Recreation Park, Alloa
19:30	Spence 72', 89'; McCord 74'	Report	Miller 49'; Shiels 64'	Attendance: 2,443; Referee: John McKendrick

=== Final ===
5 April 2015	Livingston	4 – 0	Alloa Athletic	McDiarmid Park, Perth
16:05	Pittman 21'; Fordyce 61'; White 86', 90'	Report		Attendance: 2,869; Referee: John Beaton
