= 2013–14 Scottish Championship =

Scottish Championship
- Season: 2013–14
- Champions: Dundee
- Promoted: Dundee; Hamilton Academical
- Relegated: Greenock Morton
- Matches: 170
- Goals: 476 (2.8 per match)
- Top goalscorer: Rory Loy (20 goals)
- Biggest home win: Hamilton Academical 10–2 Greenock Morton (3 May 2014)
- Biggest away win: Greenock Morton 1–5 Livingston (23 November 2013); Alloa Athletic 1–5 Dumbarton (18 January 2014)
- Highest scoring: Hamilton Academical 10–2 Greenock Morton (3 May 2014)
- Highest attendance: 10,718; Dundee 2–1 Dumbarton (3 May 2014)
- Lowest attendance: 318; Cowdenbeath 3–0 Greenock Morton (25 March 2014)

The 2013–14 Scottish Championship was the 20th season in the current format of 10 teams in the second-tier of Scottish football. This was the first season of the competition being part of the newly formed Scottish Professional Football League after the merger of the Scottish Premier League and the Scottish Football League.

Dundee won the title.

== Teams ==
Queen of the South were promoted as 2012–13 Scottish Second Division champions, with Alloa Athletic promoted after defeating Dunfermline Athletic 3–1 on aggregate in the play-off final.

=== Stadia and locations ===
Team	Location	Stadium	Capacity
Alloa Athletic	Alloa	Recreation Park	3,100
Cowdenbeath	Cowdenbeath	Central Park	4,309
Dumbarton	Dumbarton	Dumbarton Football Stadium	2,020
Dundee	Dundee	Dens Park	11,506
Falkirk	Falkirk	Falkirk Stadium	8,750
Greenock Morton	Greenock	Cappielow Park	11,589
Hamilton Academical	Hamilton	New Douglas Park	6,078
Livingston	Livingston	Almondvale Stadium	9,865
Queen of the South	Dumfries	Palmerston Park	7,620
Raith Rovers	Kirkcaldy	Stark's Park	8,473

=== Personnel and kits ===
Location of teams in 2013–14 Scottish Championship

Team	Manager	Kit manufacturer	Shirt sponsor
Alloa Athletic	(Scotland) Barry Smith	Pendle	Marshall Construction
Cowdenbeath	(Northern Ireland) Jimmy Nicholl	Uhlsport	Subsea Pressure Controls
Dumbarton	(Scotland) Ian Murray	1872 (Club own brand)	Bet Butler
Dundee	(Scotland) Paul Hartley	Puma	Kilmac Energy
Falkirk	(Scotland) Gary Holt	Puma	Central Demolition
Greenock Morton	(Northern Ireland) Kenny Shiels	Puma	Millions Chews
Hamilton Academical	(Scotland) Alex Neil	Nike	M&H Logistics (H), Life Skills Centres (A)
Livingston	(Scotland) John McGlynn	Adidas	Energy Assets Group
Queen of the South	(Scotland) Jim McIntyre	Joma	Southwest Mechanical Services
Raith Rovers	(Scotland) Grant Murray	Puma	O'Connell's Bar & Diner (H), Livesport.co.uk (A)

== League table ==
It was a close race for the championship, which offered automatic promotion to the 2014–15 Scottish Premiership. Dundee went into the final day in first place, but Hamilton Academical and Falkirk also had a chance of winning the championship.

Pos	Team	Pld	W	D	L	GF	GA	GD	Pts	Promotion, qualification or relegation
1	Dundee (C, P)	36	21	6	9	54	26	+28	69	Promotion to the Premiership
2	Hamilton Academical (O, P)	36	19	10	7	68	41	+27	67	Qualification for the Premiership play-off semi-final
3	Falkirk	36	19	9	8	59	33	+26	66	Qualification for the Premiership play-off quarter-final
4	Queen of the South	36	16	7	13	53	39	+14	55	Qualification for the Premiership play-off quarter-final
5	Dumbarton	36	15	6	15	65	64	+1	51	
6	Livingston	36	13	7	16	51	56	−5	46	
7	Raith Rovers	36	11	9	16	48	61	−13	42	
8	Alloa Athletic	36	11	7	18	34	51	−17	40	
9	Cowdenbeath (O)	36	11	7	18	50	72	−22	40	Qualification for the Championship play-offs
10	Greenock Morton (R)	36	6	8	22	32	71	−39	26	Relegation to League One

Source: Soccerway
Rules for classification: 1) points; 2) goal difference; 3) number of goals scored.
(C) Champions; (O) Play-off winners; (P) Promoted; (R) Relegated

== Season statistics ==
=== Top scorers ===
Rank	Scorer	Team	Goals
1	(Scotland) Rory Loy	Falkirk	20
2	(England) Kane Hemmings	Cowdenbeath	18
3	(Scotland) Peter MacDonald	Dundee	17
3	(Scotland) Marc McNulty	Livingston	17
5	(France) Anthony Andreu	Hamilton Academical	14
6	(Scotland) James Keatings	Hamilton Academical	13
6	(Scotland) Iain Russell	Queen of the South	13
8	(France) Mickaël Antoine-Curier	Hamilton Academical	12
8	(Scotland) Gavin Reilly	Queen of the South	12
10	(Scotland) Greg Stewart	Cowdenbeath	11

== Results ==
Teams play each other four times in this league. In the first half of the season each team plays every other team twice (home and away) and then do the same in the second half of the season, for a total of 36 games.

=== First half of season ===
Home \ Away	ALO	COW	DUM	DND	FAL	GMO	HAM	LIV	QOS	RAI
Alloa Athletic		3–1	1–2	0–1	0–0	2–0	1–0	1–0	0–3	1–0
Cowdenbeath	0–2		3–2	0–2	1–0	5–1	2–4	2–3	0–2	3–4
Dumbarton	1–1	0–0		1–4	1–1	3–1	2–1	1–2	0–1	2–4
Dundee	1–0	1–2	3–0		1–1	3–1	0–0	3–0	2–1	2–0
Falkirk	0–0	4–0	1–2	3–1		3–1	1–2	4–1	2–1	3–1
Greenock Morton	0–2	2–0	2–0	1–2	0–2		1–1	1–5	0–2	1–1
Hamilton Academical	0–1	1–0	4–1	0–3	2–0	1–0		2–0	2–0	1–1
Livingston	3–2	5–1	1–3	2–1	0–3	2–2	0–0		3–3	3–0
Queen of the South	0–0	1–1	1–2	4–3	2–0	2–0	0–1	2–2		0–1
Raith Rovers	4–2	3–3	2–1	0–0	1–1	2–1	0–1	1–0	2–1	

Legend: Blue = home team win; Yellow = draw; Red = away team win.

=== Second half of season ===
Home \ Away	ALO	COW	DUM	DND	FAL	GMO	HAM	LIV	QOS	RAI
Alloa Athletic		0–1	1–5	0–3	3–0	2–0	0–3	0–3	0–1	0–1
Cowdenbeath	2–2		2–4	2–0	0–2	3–0	1–1	4–0	1–1	1–0
Dumbarton	4–1	5–1		0–1	2–1	2–0	4–1	2–2	0–3	3–3
Dundee	1–1	4–0	2–1		0–1	2–0	1–0	0–1	1–0	0–0
Falkirk	3–1	5–0	2–0	2–0		1–1	0–0	1–1	1–0	2–1
Greenock Morton	0–1	1–1	3–0	1–0	1–1		3–4	2–0	1–1	0–0
Hamilton Academical	2–1	3–4	3–3	1–1	3–1	10–2		2–0	3–1	3–2
Livingston	2–0	1–0	1–2	0–2	0–1	0–1	1–1		1–2	2–0
Queen of the South	3–1	2–1	3–1	0–1	1–2	3–0	1–1	2–0		1–0
Raith Rovers	1–1	1–2	1–3	0–2	2–4	2–1	2–4	2–4	3–2	

Legend: Blue = home team win; Yellow = draw; Red = away team win.

== Championship play-offs ==
=== Semi-finals ===
==== First leg ====
7 May 2014
19:45

Ayr United	1–2	Cowdenbeath
Pope 79'	Report	G. Stewart 15', 37'

Somerset Park, Ayr
Attendance: 1,495
Referee: Don Robertson

7 May 2014
19:45

Stranraer	2–1	Dunfermline Athletic
Grehan 12'; Bell 88'	Report	El Bakhtaoui 41'

Stair Park, Stranraer
Attendance: 867
Referee: Bobby Madden

==== Second leg ====
10 May 2014
15:00

Cowdenbeath	3–1	Ayr United
G. Stewart 1', 30'; O'Brien 52'	Report	Donald 35'

Central Park, Cowdenbeath
Attendance: 933
Referee: John Beaton

Cowdenbeath won 5–2 on aggregate.

10 May 2014
15:00

Dunfermline Athletic	3–0 (a.e.t.)	Stranraer
Geggan 59', 98'; El Bakhtaoui 103'	Report

East End Park, Dunfermline
Attendance: 4,525
Referee: Crawford Allan

Dunfermline Athletic won 4–2 on aggregate.

=== Final ===
==== First leg ====
14 May 2014
19:45

Cowdenbeath	1–1	Dunfermline Athletic
O'Brien 83'	Report	Geggan 77'

Central Park, Cowdenbeath
Attendance: 3,379
Referee: Stephen Finnie

==== Second leg ====
18 May 2014
16:05

Dunfermline Athletic	0–3	Cowdenbeath
	Report	Hemmings 1'; O'Brien 67'; G. Stewart 77'

East End Park, Dunfermline
Attendance: 8,288
Referee: Steven McLean

Cowdenbeath won 4–1 on aggregate.
