= 2014 Scottish Challenge Cup final =

- Event: 2013–14 Scottish Challenge Cup
Raith Rovers	Rangers
1	0
- After extra time
- Date: 6 April 2014
- Venue: Easter Road, Edinburgh
- Referee: Kevin Clancy
- Attendance: 19,983

The 2014 Scottish Challenge Cup final, also known as the Ramsdens Cup final for sponsorship reasons, was a football match that took place at Easter Road on 6 April 2014, between Raith Rovers and Rangers. The match was televised by BBC ALBA. It was the 23rd final of the Scottish Challenge Cup since it was first organised in 1990 to celebrate the centenary of the now defunct Scottish Football League, it was the first Challenge Cup final since the formation of the SPFL. Both teams progressed through four elimination rounds to reach the final. The match was both clubs' first appearance in the final of the competition, whilst it was Raith Rovers' first cup final in 20 years since winning the League Cup in 1994.

== Route to the final ==
The competition is a knock-out tournament and in 2013–14 was contested by 32 teams; the 30 clubs that played in the Championship, League One and League Two of the Scottish Professional Football League, Highland League club Formartine United by invitation (the highest placed team in that league from the previous season with an SFA licence) & the winner of a preliminary round tie between Spartans & Threave Rovers (the highest placed teams in the previous season's East of Scotland & South of Scotland leagues with SFA licences), the winner of the tie being Spartans. For the first and second rounds only, the draw was divided into two geographical regions – north/east and south/west. Teams were paired at random and the winner of each match progressed to the next round and the loser was eliminated.

=== Raith Rovers ===
Round	Opposition	Score
First round	Stirling Albion (h)	2–1
Second round	Dunfermline Athletic (a)	2–0
Quarter-final	Falkirk (h)	1–0
Semi-final	Annan Athletic (h)	3–0

=== Rangers ===
Round	Opposition	Score
First round	Albion Rovers (a)	4–0
Second round	Berwick Rangers (h)	2–0
Quarter-final	Queen of the South (a)	3–0
Semi-final	Stenhousemuir (a)	1–0

== Match details ==
6 April 2014
16:05
Final

Raith Rovers	1 – 0 (a.e.t.)	Rangers
Baird 117'	Report

Easter Road
Attendance: 19,983
Referee: Kevin Clancy

Raith Rovers	Rangers

RAITH ROVERS:
GK	20	(England) Lee Robinson
RB	2	(Scotland) Jason Thomson (c)
CB	4	(Scotland) Paul Watson
CB	5	(Scotland) Dougie Hill
LB	3	(Scotland) Callum Booth
RM	7	(Scotland) Joe Cardle	(yellow card) 68'	(substituted off) 90+5'
CM	8	(Scotland) Kevin Moon		(substituted off) 78'
CM	6	(Scotland) Liam Fox	(yellow card) 42'
LM	11	(Scotland) Grant Anderson	(yellow card) 77'
CF	29	(Scotland) John Baird
CF	10	(Scotland) Calum Elliot	(yellow card) 45'	(substituted off) 86'
Substitutes:
GK	17	(Scotland) Ross Laidlaw
DF	14	(Scotland) Reece Donaldson
DF	19	(Scotland) Fraser Mullen	(yellow card) 120+1'	(substituted in) 78'
FW	15	(Scotland) Gordon Smith		(substituted in) 86'
FW	9	(Scotland) Greig Spence		(substituted in) 90+5'
Manager:
(Scotland) Grant Murray

RANGERS:
GK	1	(Scotland) Cammy Bell
RB	2	(Scotland) Richard Foster
CB	6	(Scotland) Lee McCulloch (c)
CB	3	(Tunisia) Bilel Mohsni
LB	5	(Scotland) Lee Wallace		(substituted off) 66'
RM	4	(Canada) Fraser Aird
CM	8	(Scotland) Ian Black	(yellow card) 75'
CM	10	(Scotland) Kyle Hutton		(substituted off) 61'
CM	11	(England) Nicky Law
LM	7	(Scotland) Steven Smith	(yellow card) 79'	(substituted off) 111'
CF	9	(Republic of Ireland) Jon Daly
Substitutes:
GK	17	(England) Steve Simonsen
DF	14	(France) Sébastien Faure	(yellow card) 74'	(substituted in) 66'
MF	15	(Northern Ireland) Dean Shiels
FW	16	(Scotland) Calum Gallagher		(substituted in) 111'
FW	12	(Scotland) Nicky Clark	(yellow card) 65'	(substituted in) 61'
Manager:
(Scotland) Ally McCoist

Match officials

- Referee: Kevin Clancy
- Assistant referees:
  - Stephen Mitchell
  - Joseph Lawson
- Fourth official: Greg Aitken

Match rules

- 90 minutes.
- 30 minutes of extra-time if necessary.
- Penalty shoot-out if scores still level.
- Five named substitutes.
- Maximum of three substitutions.
