= Callum Booth =

Scottish footballer (born 1991)

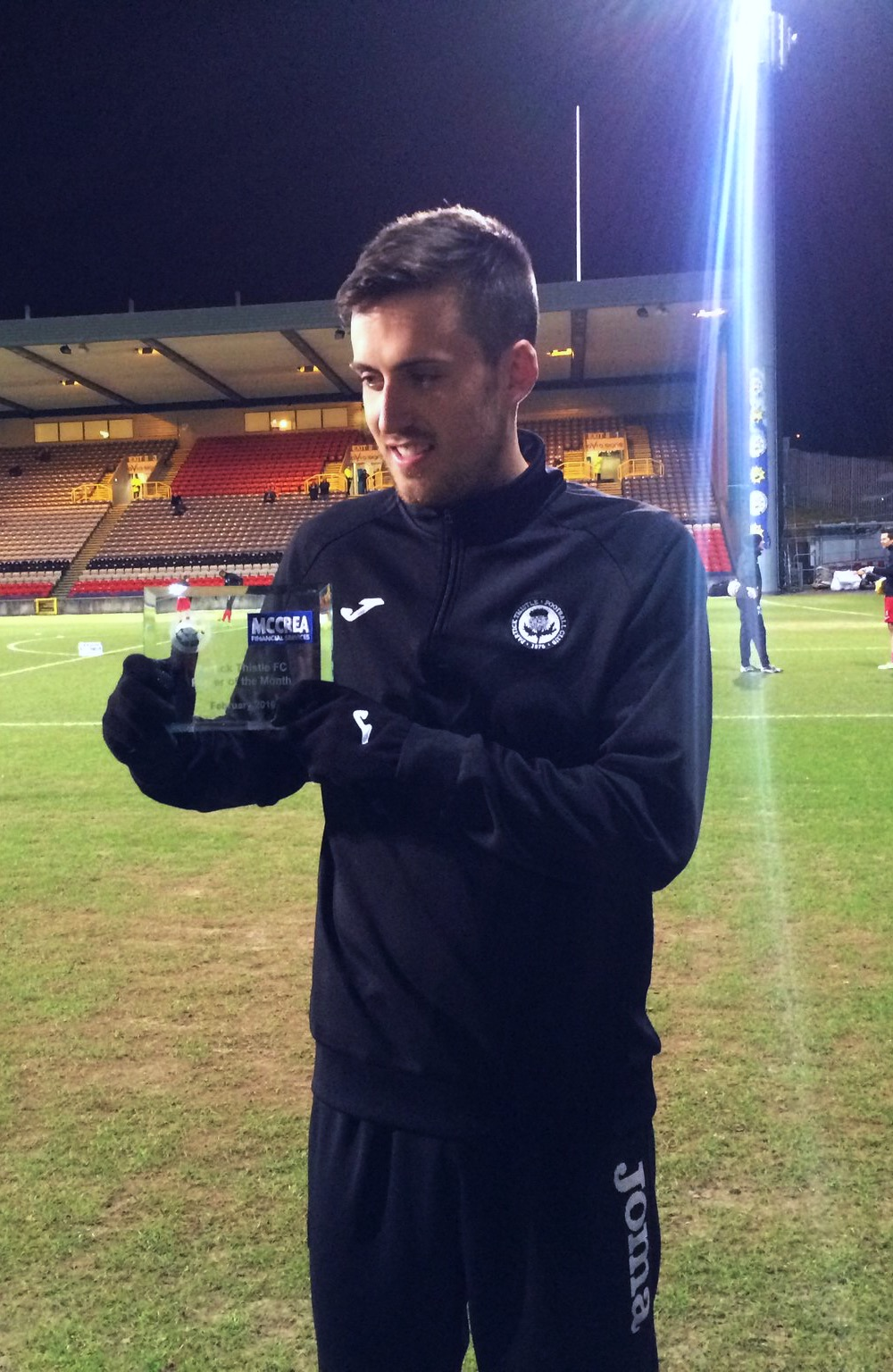
- Booth in 2016

Personal information
- Full name: Callum Booth
- Date of birth: 30 May 1991 (age 35)
- Place of birth: Stranraer, Scotland
- Position: Left-back

Team information
- Current team: The Spartans
- Number: 3

Youth career
- 2001–2010: Hibernian

Senior career*
| Years | Team | Apps | (Gls) |
| 2010–2015 | Hibernian | 40 | (3) |
| 2010 | → Arbroath (loan) | 15 | (1) |
| 2010 | → Brechin City (loan) | 11 | (2) |
| 2012–2013 | → Livingston (loan) | 31 | (1) |
| 2013–2014 | → Raith Rovers (loan) | 35 | (3) |
| 2015 | → Partick Thistle (loan) | 14 | (0) |
| 2015–2018 | Partick Thistle | 77 | (3) |
| 2018–2019 | Dundee United | 21 | (2) |
| 2019–2024 | St Johnstone | 58 | (0) |
| 2024 | → The Spartans (loan) | 16 | (0) |
| 2024– | The Spartans | 45 | (1) |

International career^{‡}
| 2008–2010 | Scotland U19 | 13 | (0) |
| 2010–2011 | Scotland U21 | 4 | (0) |
- * Club domestic league appearances and goals as of 4 May 2026 ‡ National team caps and goals as of 11 October 2012

Callum Booth (born 30 May 1991) is a Scottish professional footballer who plays as a left-back for Scottish League Two side The Spartans.

Booth, who joined Hibernian aged 10, played for the youth team that won a league and cup double in 2009. After loan spells with Arbroath and Brechin City in 2010, he broke into the Hibernian first team in 2011. He was selected less frequently during 2012 and was loaned to Livingston for the 2012–13 season and then to Raith Rovers the following season. Booth moved to Partick Thistle in January 2015, initially on loan. After three years at Firhill he signed for Dundee United in May 2018, leaving the club in August 2019.

== Early life ==
Booth was born in Stranraer, but he moved to Haddington, East Lothian, aged three, with his parents and elder brother Tom. He was educated at Haddington Infant School, King's Meadow Primary and Knox Academy.

== Career ==
=== Hibernian ===
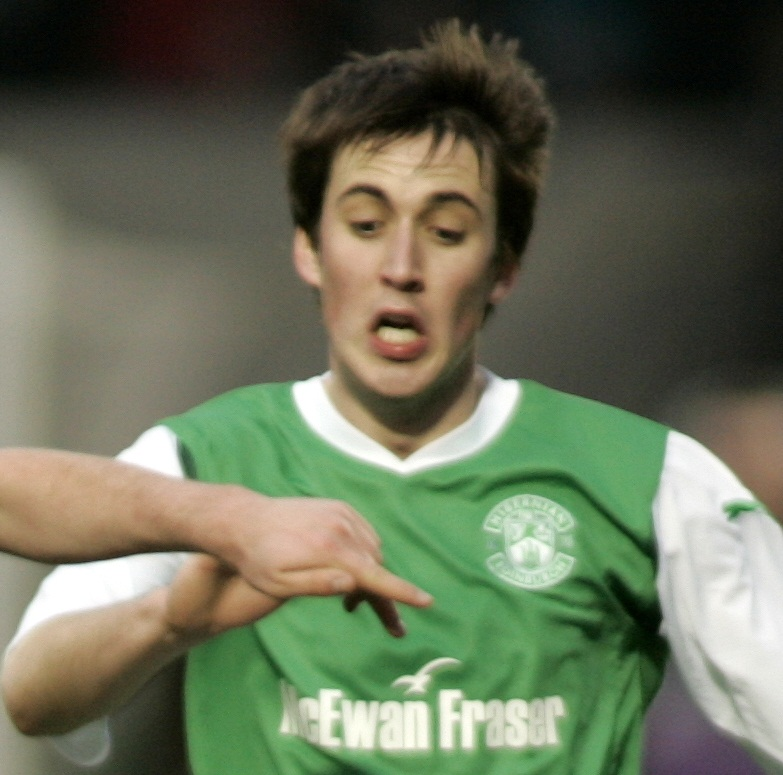
Booth playing for Hibernian

Booth joined the Hibernian youth setup aged 10, and he played for the Hibs under-19s side that won the League and Cup double in the 2008–09 season. Booth signed professional terms with Hibs after that success, but had to wait to make his first appearance in the first team.

He had loan spells at Scottish Football League clubs Arbroath in 2009–10, where he won the Scottish Football League Young Player of the Month for February 2010 and in 2010–11 at Brechin City. Colin Calderwood gave Booth a long-term contract when he returned from the latter club in December 2010.

Booth made his debut for Hibernian on 18 January 2011, in a 1–0 Scottish Cup defeat at Ayr United. He scored his first goal for the club in a 2–0 win against Inverness CT on 26 February at Easter Road. Following his good run of form since his debut, he was named as SPL Young Player of the Month for February 2011. Booth was dropped from the team early in the 2011–12 season, after he made a few defensive errors.

Booth signed on loan for Livingston in August 2012. In total he made 31 First Division appearances for the West Lothian club.

Booth moved on loan to Raith Rovers, for the full duration of the 2013–14 season, in June 2013. On 6 April 2014, he played the full match as Raith Rovers beat Rangers 1–0 after extra time at Easter Road to win the Scottish Challenge Cup.

=== Partick Thistle ===
On 28 January 2015, Booth joined Partick Thistle for the remainder of the season on loan. On 14 May 2015, it was announced that Booth had signed a one-year contract with Thistle. His contract was extended by another year in February 2016, when he made his 25th league appearance of the 2015/16 season. Booth scored his first goal for Partick Thistle in a 3–1 away defeat to Motherwell. He scored his second goal for Thistle only a few days later in a 2–1 victory away to St. Johnstone.

Booth signed a new two-year contract with Thistle, with the option of a further year, on 7 April 2016. He scored his first goal of the 2016–17 season in a 2–0 home win against Dundee on 28 December 2016, with a curling free kick. Thistle were relegated via the playoffs at the end of the 2017–18 season. Following that relegation, Booth was one of many players released by the club.

=== Dundee United ===
Booth signed a two-year contract with Scottish Championship club Dundee United on 30 May 2018. He left the club on 24 July 2019.

=== St Johnstone ===
After leaving Dundee United, Booth agreed a two-year contract with Bury that was due to be completed upon the lifting of a transfer embargo. The embargo was never lifted and Bury were subsequently expelled from the English Football League, which meant that the transfer never took place.

On 16 September 2019, Booth signed for St Johnstone on a contract until January 2020. In December 2019 his contract was extended until the end of the season. Booth was one of three St Johnstone players to sign a short term six-month contract extension in May 2020, as the club formulated plans amid the ongoing coronavirus pandemic. On 28 February 2021, he started for St Johnstone as they won 1–0 against Livingston in the February 2021 Scottish League Cup Final.

In January 2024, Booth joined Scottish League Two club The Spartans on loan until the end of the season.

== Career statistics ==
As of 6 August 2021

Appearances and goals by club, season and competition
| Club | Season | League | | | Scottish Cup | | League Cup | | Other | | Total | |
| Club | Season | Division | Apps | Goals | Apps | Goals | Apps | Goals | Apps | Goals | Apps | Goals |
|---|---|---|---|---|---|---|---|---|---|---|---|---|
| Hibernian | 2010–11 | Scottish Premier League | 17 | 1 | 1 | 0 | 0 | 0 | 0 | 0 | 18 | 1 |
| Hibernian | 2011–12 | Scottish Premier League | 12 | 1 | 1 | 0 | 2 | 0 | — | | 15 | 1 |
| Hibernian | 2012–13 | Scottish Premier League | 0 | 0 | 0 | 0 | 1 | 0 | — | | 1 | 0 |
| Hibernian | 2013–14 | Scottish Premiership | 0 | 0 | 0 | 0 | 0 | 0 | — | | 0 | 0 |
| Hibernian | 2014–15 | Scottish Championship | 11 | 1 | 0 | 0 | 1 | 0 | 0 | 0 | 12 | 1 |
| Hibernian | Total | | 40 | 3 | 2 | 0 | 4 | 0 | 0 | 0 | 46 | 3 |
| Arbroath (loan) | 2009–10 | Scottish Second Division | 15 | 1 | 0 | 0 | 0 | 0 | 4 (Note: Appearances in the Second Division play-offs) | 0 | 19 | 1 |
| Brechin City (loan) | 2010–11 | Scottish Second Division | 11 | 2 | 0 | 0 | 3 | 0 | 1 (Note: Appearances in the Scottish Challenge Cup) | 0 | 15 | 2 |
| Livingston (loan) | 2012–13 | Scottish First Division | 31 | 1 | 1 | 0 | 0 | 0 | 0 | 0 | 32 | 1 |
| Raith Rovers (loan) | 2013–14 | Scottish Championship | 35 | 3 | 4 | 0 | 2 | 0 | 5 | 0 | 46 | 3 |
| Partick Thistle (loan) | 2014–15 | Scottish Premiership | 14 | 0 | 0 | 0 | 0 | 0 | — | | 14 | 0 |
| Partick Thistle | 2015–16 | Scottish Premiership | 34 | 2 | 2 | 0 | 1 | 0 | — | | 37 | 2 |
| Partick Thistle | 2016–17 | Scottish Premiership | 31 | 1 | 2 | 0 | 5 | 0 | — | | 38 | 1 |
| Partick Thistle | 2017–18 | Scottish Premiership | 12 | 0 | 2 | 0 | 4 | 0 | 2 (Note: Appearances in the Scottish Premiership play-offs) | 0 | 20 | 0 |
| Partick Thistle | Total | | 77 | 3 | 6 | 0 | 10 | 0 | 2 | 0 | 95 | 3 |
| Dundee United | 2018–19 | Scottish Championship | 26 | 1 | 1 | 1 | 1 | 0 | 5 (Note: One appearance in the Scottish Challenge Cup and four appearances in the Scottish Premiership play-offs) | 0 | 33 | 2 |
| Dundee United | 2019–20 | Scottish Championship | 0 | 0 | 0 | 0 | 0 | 0 | 0 | 0 | 0 | 0 |
| Dundee United | Total | | 26 | 1 | 1 | 1 | 1 | 0 | 5 | 0 | 33 | 2 |
| St Johnstone | 2019–20 | Scottish Premiership | 13 | 0 | 2 | 1 | 0 | 0 | — | | 15 | 1 |
| St Johnstone | 2020–21 | Scottish Premiership | 18 | 0 | 4 | 0 | 7 | 0 | — | | 29 | 0 |
| St Johnstone | 2021–22 | Scottish Premiership | 0 | 0 | 0 | 0 | 0 | 0 | 1 (Note: Appearances in the UEFA Europa League) | 0 | 1 | 0 |
| St Johnstone | Total | | 31 | 0 | 6 | 1 | 7 | 0 | 1 | 0 | 45 | 1 |
| Career total | | | 280 | 14 | 20 | 2 | 27 | 0 | 18 | 0 | 345 | 16 |

== Honours ==
Raith Rovers

- Scottish Challenge Cup: 2013–14

St Johnstone

- Scottish Cup: 2020–21
- Scottish League Cup: 2020–21
