= Paul Watson (footballer, born 1990) =

Scottish footballer

Personal information
- Date of birth: 20 December 1990 (age 35)
- Place of birth: Edinburgh, Scotland
- Height: 1.80 m (5 ft 11 in)
- Position: Centre-back

Team information
- Current team: The Spartans
- Number: 44

Youth career
- –2006: Hutchison Vale BC
- 2006–2009: Ipswich Town U18s

Senior career*
Years	Team	Apps	(Gls)
2008–2009	Ipswich Town	0	(0)
2009–2013	Livingston	109	(6)
2013–2015	Raith Rovers	58	(2)
2015–2018	Falkirk	56	(3)
2018–2020	Dundee United	42	(4)
2020–2021	Dunfermline Athletic	29	(2)
2022–2023	Falkirk	11	(3)
2023–	The Spartans	37	(3)
- * Club domestic league appearances and goals as of 4 May 2026

Paul Watson (born 20 December 1990) is a Scottish professional footballer who plays as a centre-back for Scottish League Two club The Spartans.

== Career ==
=== Livingston ===
Former Livingston manager Gary Bollan signed Watson from Ipswich Town in August 2009. He helped the club win the Scottish Third Division, in his first season at Almondvale. The next season, he helped Livingston win the Scottish Second Division title by making 33 appearances for the West Lothian club. Watson subsequently signed a new two-year contract, keeping him at the club until the summer of 2013.

=== Raith Rovers ===
Watson signed for Raith Rovers on 17 July 2013.

On 12 June 2015, it was confirmed that Watson would not be renewing his contract with the club.

=== Falkirk ===
On 19 July 2015, it was announced that Watson had joined Falkirk. He was released by Falkirk at the end of the 2017–18 season.

=== Dundee United ===
On 20 July 2018, Watson signed for Dundee United, agreeing a two-year contract. After winning the Scottish Championship with them in the 2019–20 season, Watson was released by United at the end of COVID-19-shortened season.

=== Dunfermline Athletic ===
On 29 June 2020, Watson was announced as Dunfermline Athletic's first summer signing, joining the Scottish Championship side on a two-year deal.

On 19 October 2021, Watson left Dunfermline Athletic via mutual consent.

=== Return to Falkirk ===
On 24 January 2022, Watson returned to Falkirk on an 18-month contract.

=== The Spartans ===
On 25 August 2023, Watson made a move to newly promoted Scottish League Two side The Spartans.

== Career statistics ==
As of 25 September 2021

Appearances and goals by club, season and competition
Club	Season	League			Scottish Cup		League Cup		Other		Total	
Club	Season	Division	Apps	Goals	Apps	Goals	Apps	Goals	Apps	Goals	Apps	Goals
Livingston	2009–10	Scottish Third Division	26	1	3	0	0	0	0	0	29	1
Livingston	2010–11	Scottish Second Division	33	1	1	0	0	0	1 (Note: Appearances in the Scottish Challenge Cup)	0	35	1
Livingston	2011–12	Scottish First Division	32	1	2	0	2	0	4	0	40	1
Livingston	2012–13	Scottish First Division	18	3	0	0	2	0	1	0	21	3
Livingston	Total		109	6	6	0	4	0	6	0	125	6
Raith Rovers	2013–14	Scottish Championship	22	1	2	0	2	0	5	0	31	1
Raith Rovers	2014–15	Scottish Championship	36	1	4	1	2	0	1	0	43	2
Raith Rovers	Total		58	2	6	1	4	0	6	0	74	3
Falkirk	2015–16	Scottish Championship	27	3	1	1	3	0	5 (Note: Three appearances in the Scottish Challenge Cup; two appearances and a goal in the Premiership play-offs)	1	36	5
Falkirk	2016–17	Scottish Championship	11	0	1	0	4	0	3 (Note: Two appearances in the Scottish Challenge Cup and one in the Premiership play-offs)	0	19	0
Falkirk	2017–18	Scottish Championship	18	0	1	0	4	0	1	0	24	0
Falkirk	Total		56	3	3	1	11	0	9	1	79	5
Dundee United	2018–19	Scottish Championship	23	4	1	0	1	0	4 (Note: Appearances in the Scottish Premiership play-offs)	0	29	4
Dundee United	2019–20	Scottish Championship	19	0	1	0	2	1	1	0	23	1
Dundee United	Total		42	4	2	0	3	1	5	0	52	5
Dunfermline Athletic	2020–21	Scottish Championship	23	2	0	0	6	1	2	0	31	3
Dunfermline Athletic	2021–22	Scottish Championship	6	0	0	0	5	0	0	0	11	0
Dunfermline Athletic	Total		29	2	0	0	11	1	2	0	42	3
Career total			294	17	17	2	33	2	28	1	372	22

== Honours ==
Livingston

- Scottish Third Division: 2009–10
- Scottish Second Division: 2010–11

Raith Rovers

- Scottish Challenge Cup: 2013–14

Dundee United

- Scottish Championship: 2019–20
