= Calum Elliot =

Scottish footballer and manager

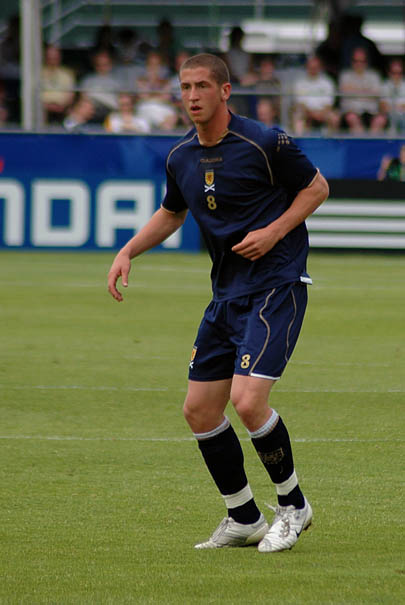
- Elliot playing for the Scotland U20 team in the 2007 FIFA U-20 World Cup.

Personal information
- Date of birth: 30 March 1987 (age 39)
- Place of birth: Edinburgh, Scotland
- Position: Forward

Team information
- Current team: Edinburgh University

Youth career
- –: Hutchison Vale BC
- 2004–2005: Heart of Midlothian

Senior career*
Years	Team	Apps	(Gls)
2004–2012	Heart of Midlothian	110	(13)
2006	→ Motherwell (loan)	15	(2)
2008–2009	→ Livingston (loan)	13	(11)
2011	→ Dundee (loan)	6	(0)
2012–2013	Žalgiris Vilnius	33	(16)
2013	Alloa Athletic	10	(2)
2013–2015	Raith Rovers	47	(7)
2017–2018	Mousehole		
Total		234	(51)

International career^{‡}
2007	Scotland U20	7	(0)
2007–2008	Scotland U21	8	(0)

Managerial career
- 2015–2016: Edinburgh United
- 2017–2018: Mousehole
- 2018–2020: Tynecastle
- 2020–2022: Tranent Juniors
- 2023: Penicuik Athletic
- 2023–2024: Cowdenbeath
- 2024–2025: Bonnyrigg Rose
- 2026-: Edinburgh University
- * Club domestic league appearances and goals as of 20:50, 9 August 2015 (UTC) ‡ National team caps and goals as of 30 June 2013

Calum Elliot (born 30 March 1987) is a Scottish former professional footballer who is manager of East of Scotland League club Edinburgh University.

He played as a forward for Heart of Midlothian, Motherwell, Livingston, Dundee, Žalgiris Vilnius, Alloa and Raith Rovers. He also represented Scotland at youth international levels up to and including the under-21 team. He was previous manager of Tranent Juniors until he left his position in August 2022 and went onto Cowdenbeath.

== Club career ==
=== Hearts ===
Elliot grew up in south-western Edinburgh, attending Bonaly Primary School then Firrhill High School. He signed for Hearts in 2004, having previously played with their youth initiative and Salvesen Boys Club. He made his first team debut as a substitute against Inverness Caledonian Thistle early in the 2004–05 season. He scored his first Hearts goals in the 5–0 win over Falkirk in December 2005. Less than a week later he signed a new three-and-a-half-year deal with the Jambos. His form during the 2005–06 season ensured he was considered a possible candidate for the 2006 Scottish PFA Young Player of the Year, although the title was won by Kilmarnock's Steven Naismith. Elliot was surprised to find himself available for loan at the beginning of the 2006–07 season, although his initial anger and disappointment were replaced by an acceptance of the benefit of regular first team action. Despite interest from Dunfermline Athletic and Falkirk, Elliot eventually joined Motherwell on loan. In May 2008, Elliot was linked with a move to Scottish First Division side Dunfermline Athletic. Inverness Caley Thistle were also reported to be looking at the unsettled striker in June 2008. Elliot travelled south for talks with League 1 side MK Dons, but eventually signed for Livingston on a loan deal, where he scored 11 goals in thirteen appearances. Elliot started in his first match for Hearts since returning on loan from Livingston on 4 April 2009 against Kilmarnock, scoring twice in a 3–1 win. Thanks to this display, Elliot won the SPL Young Player of the Month for April 2009.

Due to injury appearances were limited and he failed to score any goals during the 2009–10 season. The following season Elliot scored three goals in the first two games of the 2010–11 season with his fourth goal coming against Inverness Caley Thistle in a 3–1 victory for Hearts. Due to an ongoing knee injury his appearances were limited and had to undergo surgery which ruled him out of the end of the season. Having built his fitness back up on 4 November 2011, he signed for Scottish First Division side Dundee on a month's loan. Making his debut the following day against Partick Thistle Only 30 seconds into the match he suffered a recurrence of his knee injury and despite trying to play on had to be stretchered off after four minutes. The injury was not as bad as first feared and he missed only one game before returning as a substitute in Dundee's 2–1 win over Stirling. His loan was later extended until 31 December. With Hearts in financial difficulty and looking to cut their squad, on 12 December 2011 it was announced the Elliot had come to an agreement with Hearts to end his contract with the club early. His contract expired on 1 January 2012.

=== Žalgiris Vilnius and Alloa Athletic ===
Having turned down an offer to join Houston Dynamo on a weeks trial, Elliot agreed a two-year deal with Lithuanian A Lyga club Žalgiris Vilnius. He signed for them on 20 January 2012. Elliot scored his first goal for Žalgiris Vilnius on his first A Lyga game in a 2–1 away win over FK Banga Gargždai. He then scored 4 goals in his second league match against FK Atlantas in a 7–0 demolition at home. On 20 May 2012, he won the Lithuanian Football Federation Cup with Žalgiris Vilnius defeating the winner of the tournament in the previous two seasons Ekranas 3–1 after a penalty shootout.

On 25 February 2013, it was announced by Scottish Second Division club Alloa Athletic that Elliot had signed a deal which would see him play the club until the end of the season. He was due to be included in Paul Hartley's squad for the midweek trip to Arbroath the same week, subject to international clearance from the Lithuanian FA.

=== Raith Rovers ===
In April 2013, Eliott signed a pre-contract agreement to rejoin Livingston for the 2013–14 season, having previously spent time on loan with the club earlier in his career. On 4 June, fellow Scottish First Division side Raith Rovers announced he had signed for them on a one-year deal, prompting the West Lothian side to seek urgent clarification. Both clubs felt they were entitled to register the player however, on 6 June, Livingston decided not to pursue the situation further citing their disappointment in the player's conduct. This left Raith Rovers free to register the player. After two years with Raith, Elliot was forced to retire in 2015 due to knee injuries.

== International career ==
Elliot was rewarded with a place in the Scotland squad for the 2006 UEFA U-19 Championships. He scored twice during the tournament, including the winner in the 1–0 semi-final victory over the Czech Republic, as Scotland creditably finished runners-up. In the summer of 2007, Elliot was selected in the squad Scotland squad for the FIFA Under-20 World Cup, which was held in Canada.

== Management ==
Elliot was appointed manager of Junior side Edinburgh United in August 2015. He resigned 14 months later, with the club lying in sixth place in the Junior South Division and 16 points off promotion.

Elliot joined Mousehole in November 2017. The club play in the South West Peninsula League which is competed for by teams in Devon and Cornwall. Elliot's initial roles were as player, in combination with being full-time academy coach and also assisting first-team manager Kevin Richards. Elliot then took on the role of manager on a temporary basis following Richards' departure from the club in April 2018, with the position now since made permanent.

On 26 November 2018, Elliot become the new manager of Tynecastle.

Elliot was announced as the new manager of Tranent Juniors with his assistant Conan McDiarmid on 26 September 2020 until August 2022.

Elliot was appointed as the new manager of Penicuik Athletic on 6 March 2023. He left the role on 20 April 2023.

He left the Blue Brazil to become manager of Bonnyrigg Rose on 25 March 2024. Elliot was sacked from his role on 11 March 2025.

== Managerial statistics ==
As of match played 8 March 2025

Managerial record by team and tenure
Team	From	To	Record					Ref
Team	From	To	P	W	D	L	Win %	Ref
Tyncastle FC	26 November 2018	26 September 2020	23	21	2	0	91.3	
Tranent Juniors	26 September 2020	24 August 2022	50	34	14	2	68.0	
Penicuik Athletic	6 March 2023	20 April 2023	7	4	1	2	57.1	
Cowdenbeath	21 April 2023	25 March 2024	43	16	12	15	37.2	
Bonnyrigg Rose	25 March 2024	10 March 2025	39	11	9	19	28.2	

- Managerial statistics for tenure at Edinburgh United and Mousehole are not available

== Personal life ==
While Elliot was playing for Hearts, Hibernian defender Darren McCormack was arrested for an alleged assault on Elliot on 22 March 2009 near an Edinburgh nightclub.

== Career statistics ==
As of 9 August 2015

Club statistics
Club	Season	League		Cup		League Cup		Other		Total	
Club	Season	App	Goals	App	Goals	App	Goals	App	Goals	App	Goals
Heart of Midlothian	2004–05	4	0	0	0	0	0	0	0	4	0
Heart of Midlothian	2005–06	28	5	4	1	2	0	0	0	34	6
Heart of Midlothian	2006–07	10	0	1	0	0	0	1	0	12	0
Heart of Midlothian	2007–08	24	2	0	0	3	2	0	0	27	4
Heart of Midlothian	2008–09	12	2	1	0	0	0	0	0	13	2
Heart of Midlothian	2009–10	13	0	0	0	0	0	0	0	13	0
Heart of Midlothian	2010–11	19	4	1	0	1	0	0	0	21	4
Heart of Midlothian	2011–12	0	0	0	0	0	0	0	0	0	0
Heart of Midlothian	Total	110	13	7	1	6	2	1	0	124	16
Motherwell (loan)	2006–07	15	2	0	0	2	0	0	0	17	2
Livingston (loan)	2008–09	13	11	0	0	1	0	0	0	14	11
Dundee (loan)	2011–12	6	0	1	0	0	0	0	0	7	0
Žalgiris Vilnius	2012	33	16	4	1	0	0	0	0	37	17
Alloa	2012–13	10	2	0	0	0	0	4	2	14	4
Raith Rovers	2013–14	30	6	2	0	2	2	5	2	39	10
Raith Rovers	2014–15	17	1	1	0	1	2	0	0	19	3
Raith Rovers	Total	47	7	3	0	3	4	5	2	58	13
Total		234	51	15	2	12	6	10	4	271	63

== Honours ==
=== As a player ===
Žalgiris Vilnius

- Lithuanian Football Cup: 2011–12

Raith Rovers

- Scottish Challenge Cup: 2013–14

=== Individual ===
- SPL Young Player of the Month: December 2005, April 2009
- SFL Young Player of the Month: September 2008

=== As a manager ===
Tynecastle

- East of Scotland Conference B: 2019–20

Tranent Juniors

- East of Scotland Premier: 2021–22 (Promoted to Lowland League after play-off)
