= John Baird (footballer, born 1985) =

Scottish footballer (born 1985)

Personal information
- Full name: John David Baird
- Date of birth: 22 August 1985 (age 41)
- Place of birth: Glasgow, Scotland
- Position: Striker

Team information
- Current team: Mandurah City

Senior career*
Years	Team	Apps	(Gls)
2002–2004	Clyde	1	(0)
2004–2007	St Mirren	22	(4)
2006	→ Stenhousemuir (loan)	19	(5)
2007	→ Montrose (loan)	9	(5)
2007–2009	Montrose	41	(20)
2008	→ Brechin City (loan)	9	(0)
2009–2010	Airdrie United	43	(13)
2010–2012	Raith Rovers	71	(23)
2012–2013	Dundee	37	(4)
2013–2014	Partick Thistle	13	(0)
2014	Raith Rovers	14	(7)
2014–2015	Queen of the South	18	(3)
2015–2017	Falkirk	87	(32)
2017–2018	Inverness Caledonian Thistle	22	(3)
2018	→ Greenock Morton (loan)	8	(3)
2018–2019	Forfar Athletic	36	(16)
2019–2020	Raith Rovers	19	(4)
2020–	Mandurah City	84	(43)

Managerial career
- 2018–2019: Forfar Athletic (player/assistant manager)
- 2020–: Mandurah City (player/manager)
- * Club domestic league appearances and goals as of 17 July 2020 (UTC)

John David Baird (born 22 August 1985) is a Scottish footballer who plays as a forward. He currently plays for Football West State League Division 1 side Mandurah City.

Baird has also previously played for Clyde, St Mirren, Stenhousemuir, Montrose, Brechin City, Airdrie United, Dundee, Partick Thistle, Raith Rovers, Queen of the South, Falkirk, Inverness Caledonian Thistle, Greenock Morton and Forfar Athletic where he was also the assistant manager.

== Career ==
=== Clyde, St Mirren and Montrose ===
Baird, who was born in Glasgow, began his career with Clyde, and made his debut in May 2003, coming on as a substitute against Ayr United. Baird signed a professional contract with Clyde in July 2003, but only made one more appearance for the club, in the Scottish Challenge Cup, before he was released from his contract along with seven other youth players in December 2003.

He was then snatched up by St Mirren, where he became a fringe player. He had loan spells at Stenhousemuir and Montrose, before signing for Montrose on a permanent transfer in July 2007. Upon the move, Manager Jim Weir made expectations for Baird and Andy Rodgers to become the top scorer in the Third Division.

Baird signed a new contract with Montrose for at least one more year. He has stated his desire to see Montrose promoted and also his eventual aim to play full-time football.

=== Airdrie United, Raith Rovers and Dundee ===
Manager Weir was axed after a 2–1 defeat away at Cowdenbeath in September. The move saw Calum Smith go in the other direction. Baird waited until deadline day in January 2009 to make his decision to join Airdrie United, Baird enjoyed a successful second half of the 2008–09 season where he established himself as a first-team player with the new Diamonds. Baird scored crucial goals in the play-off including a hat-trick against Ayr Utd battle to keep the club in the First Division.

On 26 May 2010, he signed for Raith Rovers on a two-year full-time deal. Since his arrival at Starks Park, Baird has become a fans' favourite, scoring 13 league goals in his first season with the Kirkcaldy outfit during their 2010–11 title push. However, Raith Rovers' title push came to an end after losing 2–1 to Dunfermline Athletic. Despite this, Baird was named the First Division Player of the Year and also was named player of the year in the Irn Bru Phenomenal awards.

Baird signed for Dundee in May 2012. While at Dundee, Baird appeared in the first team, making 37 appearances, though his playing time significantly decreased. It wasn't until 19 January 2013 that he scored his first goal in a 1–1 draw against Hibernian. He went on to score three goals in three consecutive games against St Johnstone, St Mirren, Inverness Caledonian Thistle.

=== Partick Thistle, Raith return ===
He then signed for newly promoted side Partick Thistle in May 2013. However, on 28 January 2014, Baird was released by Partick Thistle after an unsuccessful time having started four games and making a further 13 substitute appearances without scoring a single competitive goal.

On 30 January 2014, Baird returned for a second spell at Raith Rovers. Baird's first game after signing for the club in his second spell came on 1 February 2014 when Raith Rovers lost 1–0 against Cowdenbeath and then scored his first goal two weeks later, in a 4–2 loss against Hamilton Academical. He scored the winner for Raith in the Challenge Cup Final, beating Rangers 1–0 in extra time at Easter Road on 6 April 2014.

=== Queen of the South and Falkirk ===
On 20 May 2014, Baird signed for Queen of the South on a two-year contract. Baird was released by the club on 5 January 2015.

On 7 January 2015, Baird signed for Falkirk, where he joined up with Mark Kerr, who had also recently departed the Dumfries club. On signing for the club, he commented that he had always admired Falkirk, saying "Falkirk is a club I've always respected and when I walked in the door Alex Smith told me I'd been nipping his ear for four years to get here." He scored on his debut for the club, a 3–3 draw away to Hibernian on 10 January 2015. On 24 February 2015, Baird signed a new contract with Falkirk, keeping him at the club until the end of the 2015–16 season with the option of an additional year.

=== Inverness ===
Baird signed for Inverness Caledonian Thistle in June 2017. He Scored his first goal & his first hat-trick for ICT in a 4–1 friendly away win at Brora Rangers

He made his first competitive start for ICT in their first game of the season, the opening game of the Scottish League Cup group stages, a 3–0 home win against Brechin City He retained his starting place for the following match, a 0–0 draw away at Stirling Albion, a match which set a record as the lowest scoring penalty shootout in Scottish football history. Baird was one of those who failed to score as Inverness won the shootout 2–0. He scored his first competitive goal for the Caley Jags a week later in a 2–1 away win at Forfar Athletic, although it wasn't enough for the club to progress from their League Cup group.

=== Greenock Morton (loan) ===
Greenock Morton announced on 22 February that they had agreed to sign Baird on an emergency loan from Inverness Caledonian Thistle for the rest of the 2017–18 season.

=== Forfar Athletic ===
Baird signed for Forfar Athletic as a player/assistant manager on 3 May 2018. Baird scored 22 goals in 44 appearances for the club, before leaving at the end of the season to move to Australia.

=== Raith return ===
In September 2019, Baird re-signed for Raith Rovers, joining the club for a third spell, claiming to have "unfinished business" at the club. However, he left with his family to Australia in June 2020, unfortunately without finishing the business he desired, due to COVID-19 postponing all footballing tournaments including a Challenge Cup Final, which would've pitted him up against a former club, Inverness Caledonian Thistle.

=== Mandurah City ===
Baird moved to Western Australian club Mandurah City in 2020, and became their head coach. He signed Leigh Griffiths to the club in August 2022.

== Career statistics ==
As of match played 11 May 2019

Appearances and goals by club, season and competition
Club	Season	League			Scottish Cup		League Cup		Other		Total	
Club	Season	Division	Apps	Goals	Apps	Goals	Apps	Goals	Apps	Goals	Apps	Goals
Clyde	2002–03	Scottish First Division	1	0	0	0	0	0	0	0	1	0
Clyde	2003–04	Scottish First Division	0	0	0	0	0	0	1 (Note: Appearances in the Scottish Challenge Cup)	0	1	0
Clyde	Total		1	0	0	0	0	0	1	0	2	0
St Mirren	2004–05	Scottish First Division	20	3	1	0	0	0	1	0	22	3
St Mirren	2005–06	Scottish First Division	2	1	0	0	1	0	1	0	4	1
St Mirren	Total		22	4	1	0	1	0	2	0	26	4
Stenhousemuir (loan)	2006–07	Third Division	19	5	1	0	1	1	0	0	21	6
Montrose (loan)	2006–07	Scottish Third Division	9	5	0	0	0	0	0	0	9	5
Montrose	2007–08	Scottish Third Division	34	18	0	0	2	0	4 (Note: Two appearances and three goals in the Scottish Challenge Cup, two appearances in the Second Division play-offs)	3	40	21
Montrose	2008–09	Scottish Third Division	8	2	0	0	1	0	0	0	9	2
Montrose	Total		42	20	0	0	3	0	4	3	49	23
Brechin City (loan)	2008–09	Scottish Second Division	9	0	1	0	0	0	0	0	10	0
Airdrie United (loan)	2008–09	Scottish Football First Division	12	2	0	0	0	0	4 (Note: Appearances in the First Division play-offs)	3	16	5
Airdrie United	2009–10	Scottish First Division	31	11	2	1	1	0	3 (Note: One appearance in the Scottish Challenge Cup and two in the First Division Play-offs)	0	37	12
Raith Rovers	2010–11	Scottish First Division	36	13	0	0	2	0	0	0	38	13
Raith Rovers	2011–12	Scottish First Division	35	10	1	0	2	1	1	2	39	13
Raith Rovers	Total		71	23	1	0	4	1	1	2	77	26
Dundee	2012–13	Scottish Premier League	37	4	3	1	2	0	—		42	5
Partick Thistle	2013–14	Scottish Premier League	13	0	1	0	3	0	—		17	0
Raith Rovers	2013–14	Scottish Championship	15	7	0	0	0	0	1	1	16	7
Queen of the South	2014–15	Scottish Championship	18	3	1	0	1	0	0	0	20	3
Falkirk	2014–15	Scottish Championship	17	7	0	0	0	0	0	0	17	7
Falkirk	2015–16	Scottish Championship	36	17	2	0	3	1	5 (Note: Two appearances and one goal in the Scottish Challenge Cup; three appearances in the Premiership play-offs)	1	46	19
Falkirk	2016–17	Scottish Championship	34	8	1	0	4	0	4 (Note: Two appearances and two goals in the Scottish Challenge Cup; two appearances in the Premiership play-offs)	2	43	10
Falkirk	Total		87	32	3	0	7	1	9	3	106	36
Inverness Caledonian Thistle	2017–18	Scottish Championship	22	3	2	0	4	1	3	0	31	4
Greenock Morton (loan)	2017–18	Scottish Championship	8	3	0	0	0	0	0	0	8	3
Forfar Athletic	2018–19	Scottish League One	36	16	2	1	3	3	3 (Note: One appearance in the Scottish Challenge Cup; two appearances and two goals in the Championship play-offs)	2	44	22
Raith Rovers	2019–20	Scottish League One	13	2	2	1	0	0	1	0	16	3
Mandurah City	2020	Football West State League Division 1										
Career total			475	140	20	4	30	7	32	14	557	164

== Honours ==
=== Player ===
Raith Rovers

- Scottish League One: 2019–20
- Scottish Challenge Cup: 2013–14, 2019–20
- PFA Scotland First Division Player of the Year: 2010–11
- SFL First Division Player of the Year: 2010–11

Mandurah City

- FWSL Division 1 Top Four Cup: 2022

=== Manager ===
Mandurah City

- FWSL Division 1 Top Four Cup: 2022
