= Greig Spence =

Scottish footballer (born 1992)

Personal information
- Date of birth: 6 July 1992 (age 34)
- Place of birth: Dunfermline, Scotland
- Height: 1.69 m (5 ft 7 in)
- Position: Striker

Team information
- Current team: East Stirlingshire
- Number: 9

Youth career
- Inverkeithing Hillfield Swifts
- Rangers
- Alloa Athletic
- 2009–2011: Celtic

Senior career*
Years	Team	Apps	(Gls)
2008–2009	Alloa Athletic	19	(4)
2011–2012	Celtic	0	(0)
2011–2012	→ Hamilton Academical (loan)	29	(5)
2012–2014	Raith Rovers	59	(20)
2014–2015	Alloa Athletic	28	(4)
2015–2016	Cowdenbeath	36	(17)
2016–2017	Alloa Athletic	35	(16)
2017–2018	Raith Rovers	32	(11)
2018–2019	Alloa Athletic	13	(0)
2019–2020	Arbroath	19	(0)
2020–2021	Stenhousemuir	20	(7)
2021	→ East Fife (loan)	9	(0)
2021–2022	Inverkeithing Hillfield Swifts		
2022–2023	Broomhill	2	(0)
2023–2024	Stirling Albion	37	(5)
2024–	East Stirlingshire	14	(3)
- * Club domestic league appearances and goals as of 14 December 2024

Greig Spence (born 6 July 1992) is a Scottish professional footballer who plays as a striker for Lowland League East club East Stirlingshire.

Born in Dunfermline, he started his career at Alloa Athletic, breaking into their first-team at the age of 16. He was then signed by Scottish Premier League club Celtic in 2009. He was loaned to First Division club Hamilton Academical for the 2011–12 season. In July 2012, he signed a one-year contract with Raith Rovers. In June 2014, he returned to Alloa before signing for Cowdenbeath the following season, before once again resigning for Alloa in 2016. After a year with Alloa, Spence moved back to Raith for his second spell, spending a further year in Kirkcaldy. Spence signed on for his fourth spell with Alloa in June 2018. He has since played for Arbroath, Stenhousemuir, East Fife (on loan) and Inverkeithing Hillfield Swifts.

== Career ==
Spence spent 10 years at Inverkeithing Hillfield Swifts.

Spence played for Rangers youth team as a schoolboy. He then moved on to Alloa Athletic where he broke into the first-team at the age of 16.

His first start came against Queens Park on 16 February, he scored Alloa's equaliser in a 2–1 win. On 4 May, Spence scored Alloa's equaliser against Ayr United, drawing the match ensured that Alloa would not be relegated. After the match manager Allan Maitland praised Spence for how well he took his goal. Overall, Spence scored four goals in nineteen appearances for Second Division Alloa during the 2008–09 season. Spence only played three times for Alloa during the 2009–10 season as he left the club in August. His only goal came in a 3–2 defeat against Ross County in the Scottish Challenge Cup.

Scottish Premier League club Celtic signed Spence in August 2009 for a six-figure fee. Spence missed the first half of the 2010–11 season through injury but came back to score in the 2011 Scottish Youth Cup Final. On 16 July 2011, Spence scored for Celtic's development squad in a 2–1 loss to Partick Thistle.

In August 2011, Spence moved on loan to Scottish First Division side Hamilton Academical. He scored his first goal for Hamilton in a 2–1 Scottish Challenge Cup quarter-final win over Morton on 4 September. Two weeks later he scored in Hamilton's 2–2 draw against Raith Rovers. On 3 November, he scored a 'superb' header in Hamilton's 3–2 loss against Ayr United. On 13 January, Spence scored the winner in Hamilton's 1–0 victory over Partick Thistle. The next week he scored in Hamilton's 2–2 draw with Ayr United. On 24 March, Spence scored the first goal in Hamilton's 3–0 win over Queen of the South.

Spence announced on his Twitter account in May 2012 that he was leaving Celtic, subsequently training with Raith Rovers in an attempt to win a permanent contract. He signed for the club on 18 July 2012. He was part of the Raith Rovers team that won 1–0 against Rangers in the 2014 Scottish Challenge Cup Final.

On 24 June 2014, Spence signed for Alloa Athletic for a second time. He scored a hat-trick on his first appearance on 26 July 2014, in a Challenge Cup match against Arbroath as Alloa won 4–1. On 3 December 2014, Spence scored twice as Alloa came from 2–0 behind to defeat Rangers 3–2 in the semi-final of the Challenge Cup, the club's first ever win against Rangers. After one season with The Wasps, Spence signed for Scottish League One side Cowdenbeath. Although Cowdenbeath were relegated to Scottish League Two Spence had a particularly successful season with the club, finishing third top scorer in the league with 17 goals, as well as being nominated for PFA Scotland's League One player of the year award and being included in the PFA Scotland League One team of the year.

In May 2016, Spence returned for his third spell with Alloa Athletic. In February 2017, Spence scored the SPFL's 8000th goal (across all four divisions, but not including play-offs), in a 2–0 win at Queen's Park.

Spence returned to the east of Scotland in June 2017, signing with his former club Raith Rovers, now in Scottish League One. After the club failed to win promotion back to the Scottish Championship, Spence was released by the club in May 2018. Spence re-signed for Alloa for his fourth spell in June 2018.

Spence spent just six months with Alloa, before signing an eighteen-month contract with League One leaders Arbroath in January 2019. He then moved to Stenhousemuir in January 2020. Spence was loaned to East Fife in April 2021.

In July 2021 he returned to boyhood club Inverkeithing Hillfield Swifts.

On 6 January 2023, Spence returned to the SPFL with Scottish League Two club Stirling Albion on an 18-month deal.

== Career statistics ==
As of 4 November 2019

Appearances and goals by club, season and competition
Club	Season	League			Scottish Cup		League Cup		Other		Total	
Club	Season	Division	Apps	Goals	Apps	Goals	Apps	Goals	Apps	Goals	Apps	Goals
Alloa Athletic	2008–09	Scottish Second Division	18	4	0	0	1	0	0	0	19	4
Alloa Athletic	2009–10	Scottish Second Division	1	0	0	0	1	0	1 (Note: Appearances in the Scottish Challenge Cup)	1	3	1
Alloa Athletic	Total		19	4	0	0	2	0	1	1	22	5
Celtic	2009–10	Scottish Premier League	0	0	0	0	0	0	0	0	0	0
Celtic	2010–11	Scottish Premier League	0	0	0	0	0	0	0	0	0	0
Celtic	2011–12	Scottish Premier League	0	0	0	0	0	0	0	0	0	0
Celtic	Total		0	0	0	0	0	0	0	0	0	0
Hamilton Academical (loan)	2011–12	Scottish First Division	29	5	2	0	0	0	3	1	34	6
Raith Rovers	2012–13	Scottish First Division	32	11	4	2	3	1	2	1	41	15
Raith Rovers	2013–14	Scottish Championship	27	9	4	0	1	1	5	2	37	12
Raith Rovers	Total		59	20	8	2	4	2	7	3	78	27
Alloa Athletic	2014–15	Scottish Championship	28	4	1	0	2	2	7 (Note: Five appearances and seven goals in the Scottish Challenge Cup and two appearances in the Scottish Championship play-offs)	7	38	13
Cowdenbeath	2015–16	Scottish League One	36	17	3	1	1	0	3 (Note: One appearance in the Scottish Challenge Cup and two appearances in the Scottish League One play-offs)	1	43	19
Alloa Athletic	2016–17	Scottish League One	35	16	2	1	6	3	7 (Note: Three appearances in the Scottish Challenge Cup and four appearances and three goals in tue Scottish Championship play-offs)	6	50	26
Raith Rovers	2017–18	Scottish League One	32	11	1	0	4	1	6 (Note: Two appearances in the Scottish Challenge Cup and four appearances and one goal in the Scottish Championship play-offs)	1	43	13
Alloa Athletic	2018–19	Scottish Championship	13	0	1	1	4	2	2	0	20	3
Arbroath	2018–19	Scottish League One	11	0	0	0	0	0	0	0	11	0
Arbroath	2019–20	Scottish Championship	8	0	0	0	4	2	2	0	14	2
Arbroath	Total		19	0	0	0	4	2	2	0	21	2
Career total			270	77	18	5	27	12	38	20	353	114

== Honours ==
Raith Rovers

- Scottish Challenge Cup: 2013–14
