= Callum Robertson =

Scottish footballer

Personal information
- Date of birth: 12 July 1996 (age 30)
- Place of birth: Livingston, Scotland
- Position: Forward

Senior career*
Years	Team	Apps	(Gls)
2015–2016	Raith Rovers	2	(1)
2015–2016	→ Linlithgow Rose (loan)		
- Whitburn
- * Club domestic league appearances and goals as of 22 January 2016

Callum Robertson (born 12 July 1996) is a Scottish football player who plays as a forward, he is currently a free agent after leaving SJFA East Premier League side Whitburn Junior.

== Career ==
Born in Livingston, Robertson began his career with Raith Rovers. He was first included in a matchday squad on 16 November 2013, remaining an unused substitute in a 1–0 away defeat to Alloa Athletic in the Scottish Championship, his only inclusion that season. His debut came on 2 May 2015 as Raith concluded the season with a 2–2 draw at Dumbarton, replacing Mark Stewart in added time.

In January 2016 he was released by the club. He had been on loan at Linlithgow Rose.
