= Grant Murray =

Scottish footballer & manager (born 1975)

Personal information
- Full name: Grant Robert Murray
- Date of birth: 29 August 1975 (age 51)
- Place of birth: Edinburgh, Scotland
- Position: Defender

Team information
- Current team: Livingston F.C. (Assistant Manager)

Senior career*
Years	Team	Apps	(Gls)
1995–2001	Heart of Midlothian	75	(1)
2001–2003	St Johnstone	71	(2)
2003–2006	Partick Thistle	104	(1)
2006–2009	Kilmarnock	49	(1)
2009–2015	Raith Rovers	116	(8)
Total		415	(13)

Managerial career
- 2012–2015: Raith Rovers
- 2022–2023: Queen of the South (Interim)
- * Club domestic league appearances and goals

Grant Robert Murray (born 29 August 1975) is a Scottish former professional football player. Murray is currently the assistant manager at Livingston.

His versatility saw him play in several positions during his career, such as a defensive midfielder and at fullback, although he was primarily considered to be a centre-back.

== Playing career ==
Murray started his career with Hearts, playing for their first team in six seasons. He was an unused substitute as Hearts beat Rangers 2–1 in the 1998 Scottish Cup Final. Murray moved to St Johnstone in 2001, but they were relegated from the Scottish Premier League (SPL) in 2002. He then signed for Partick Thistle in 2003, but they were relegated from the SPL in 2004 and the First Division in 2005. Murray signed for Kilmarnock in 2006, where he linked up again with Jim Jefferies, who had been his manager at Hearts. He agreed a new two-year contract with Kilmarnock in April 2007.

Murray was released by Kilmarnock after the 2008–09 Scottish Premier League season. He signed for First Division club Raith Rovers later in the 2009 close season and scored his first goal for Raith Rovers on 29 August 2009, a stunning 30-yard volley against Dunfermline Athletic in a Fife derby at East End Park.

== Coaching career ==
Murray moved into coaching while playing for Raith Rovers, earning UEFA qualifications. On 3 July 2012, Murray was appointed their player-manager. Murray signed an extended contract with Raith Rovers in December 2013. He guided Raith Rovers to victory in the 2013–14 Scottish Challenge Cup, winning in the final against Rangers at Easter Road. It was his first trophy as a manager and Raith's first cup win since the 1994–95 Scottish League Cup. Murray was sacked by Raith in April 2015, after a run of five successive defeats.

As of October 2015, Murray was coaching Hibernian academy players. Murray guided the Hibernian Under-20's team to double success in the 2017-18 season, winning the SPFL Development League and the Scottish Youth Cup.

In March 2021, Murray was appointed assistant manager to Gary Naysmith at Scottish League Two club, Edinburgh City.

In June 2021, Murray was appointed assistant manager to Laurie Ellis at Scottish League One club Queen's Park. On 31 December 2021, Ellis and Murray departed the Spiders.

On 19 February 2022, Queens interim player-manager Willie Gibson, had Murray as his assistant manager, as Queen of the South earned a 0–0 draw at Palmerston versus Arbroath, league leaders in the Scottish Championship. On 21 February 2022, Gibson and Murray were announced as the Doonhamers management team until the end of the 2021-22 season. On 4 May 2022, Gibson and Murray were appointed Queens management team until the end of the 2022–23 season.

On 21 December 2022, after Gibson departed the Dumfries club by mutual consent, Murray was placed in interim charge of the Doonhamers.

On 10 January 2023, Marvin Bartley announced after Queens Quarter Final win over Kelty Hearts in the SPFL Trust Trophy that Murray would be remaining as the Doonhamers assistant manager, having worked with him previously at Hibernian.

== Managerial statistics ==
As of 7 January 2023

Team	From	To	Record				
Team	From	To	G	W	D	L	Win %
Raith Rovers	3 July 2012	27 April 2015	133	51	29	53	38.35
Queen of the South (Interim)	21 December 2022	7 January 2023	3	1	0	2	33.33
Total			136	52	29	55	38.24

== Honours ==
=== Player ===
Heart Of Midlothian

- Scottish Cup (1): 1997-98

=== Manager ===
Raith Rovers

- Scottish Challenge Cup (1): 2013–14
