= Liam Fox (footballer) =

Scottish footballer and coach (born 1984)

Personal information
- Date of birth: 2 February 1984 (age 42)
- Place of birth: Edinburgh, Scotland
- Position: Midfielder

Senior career*
Years	Team	Apps	(Gls)
2001–2004	Heart of Midlothian	0	(0)
2004	→ Crusaders (loan)	10	(1)
2004–2006	Inverness Caledonian Thistle	26	(4)
2006–2013	Livingston	185	(22)
2013–2015	Raith Rovers	55	(0)
2015–2016	Heart of Midlothian	0	(0)
Total		276	(27)

Managerial career
- 2016–2017: Cowdenbeath
- 2022–2023: Dundee United
- 2023–2024: Hearts B
- 2024: Heart of Midlothian (interim)
- 2025: Heart of Midlothian (interim)
- 2025–: Sporting JAX
- * Club domestic league appearances and goals

Liam Fox (born 2 February 1984) is a Scottish professional football manager and former player, who currently manages USL Championship club Sporting JAX.

Fox, who played as a midfielder, began his playing career with Heart of Midlothian, from where he was loaned to Crusaders in Northern Ireland. After a spell with Inverness Caledonian Thistle, Fox played for Livingston between 2006 and 2013, making over 200 appearances. He then played for Raith Rovers before returning to Hearts as a coach.

From 2016 to 2017, Fox was head coach of Scottish League Two club Cowdenbeath. He rejoined Hearts as a first team coach, and left in September 2020. After stints as an assistant manager with Livingston and Dundee United, he was appointed United manager in September 2022. He left that position in February 2023.

== Career ==
=== Hearts ===
Fox started his career as a youth team player at Heart of Midlothian. Having been an unused substitute for the first team once, he was loaned to Northern Ireland club Crusaders in 2004, where he made ten appearances and scored one goal.

=== Inverness CT ===
On his return to Scotland he was signed by Scottish Football League First Division team Inverness Caledonian Thistle in 2004. During his time at the club, Inverness were promoted to the Scottish Premier League. Fox scored four goals in 26 first team appearances for the club.

=== Livingston ===
In 2006, Fox signed for Livingston, then playing in the Scottish Football League First Division. Shortly after his arrival the club were placed into administration and subsequently demoted two divisions by the Scottish Football Association to the Scottish Football League Third Division. Following seven years and 219 appearances for Livingston, it was announced that Fox would be leaving the club after the 2012–13 season. On 4 May 2013, he scored for the club in his last appearance in a 3–2 defeat to Raith Rovers.

=== Raith Rovers ===
On 1 June 2013, Fox signed for Raith Rovers.

== Coaching career ==
In the summer of 2015, Fox returned to Hearts as a coach. He also registered as a player and he appeared in a pre-season friendly against former club Raith Rovers on 7 July 2015.

Fox was appointed head coach of Cowdenbeath in May 2016. Fox was sacked on 6 March 2017, with Cowdenbeath bottom of Scottish League Two and at risk of their third consecutive relegation.

In 2017 Fox returned to Hearts as a First Team coach, before being moved to Reserves Head Coach in December 2019 following a reshuffle after Daniel Stendel's appointment as Manager. In September 2020 Fox left Hearts, due to lack of reserves football in Scotland and the hiring of other first team coaches.

In December 2020, Fox was appointed as assistant manager at Livingston, under manager David Martindale. Fox left this role in May 2021.

=== Dundee United ===
In June 2021 Fox joined Dundee United as assistant manager. Fox was appointed caretaker manager of Dundee United in August 2022 following the sacking of Jack Ross. In his first game in charge, he led United to a 2–1 Scottish League Cup victory against Livingston on 31 August 2022. On 23 September, he was appointed manager of Dundee United on a permanent basis. Fox left United in February 2023, with the team sitting four points adrift at the bottom of the 2022–23 Scottish Premiership after a 4–0 defeat at Ross County. The club had only won six matches, and drawn three, in 22 games with Fox in permanent charge.

=== Aberdeen ===
Fox joined Aberdeen as a first team coach under Barry Robson in 2023.

=== Hearts ===
After leaving Aberdeen, Fox returned to Hearts in June 2023, taking on the role of manager of the Hearts B team manager.

In September 2024, Fox was appointed as caretaker manager of the Hearts first team after Steven Naismith was sacked. He took control of the team for two league matches and one Europa Conference league stage match, holding Ross County to a draw in his first game, winning in Europe against Dinamo Minsk, and narrowly losing to Aberdeen in his final game. On 15 October 2024, Neil Critchley was named as the new manager and Fox returned to his role in charge of Hearts B.

On 19 October 2024, Fox was promoted into the first team coaching staff, taking on the role of assistant first team coach. He became caretaker manager of Hearts for a second time on 26 April 2025, following the sacking of Critchley. Fox took charge of the team for their last four matches of the season, but it was announced before the final game that he would leave Hearts afterwards.

=== Sporting JAX ===
On 4 November 2025, Fox was appointed as the first head coach of Sporting Club Jacksonville, colloquially referred to as Sporting JAX, a newly formed team based in Jacksonville, Florida, set to join the USL Championship for its inaugural 2026 season. The role marked his first coaching position outside Scotland. Fox signed a two-year contract, with an option for a third year, working alongside former Rangers manager and current Jacksonville sporting director Mark Warburton. Upon his appointment, he described the opportunity as “a brilliant challenge to build a club from the bottom up,” noting that Sporting JAX had no signed players and no permanent stadium at the time of his arrival.

== Managerial record ==
As of 5 March 2026

Team	From	To	Record				
Team	From	To	G	W	D	L	Win %
Cowdenbeath	23 May 2016	6 March 2017	30	6	4	20	20.00
Dundee United	30 August 2022	26 February 2023	25	7	4	14	28.00
Heart of Midlothian (interim)	22 September 2024	15 October 2024	3	1	1	1	33.33
Heart of Midlothian (interim)	26 April 2025	18 May 2025	4	4	0	0	100.00
Sporting Club Jacksonville	4 November 2025	Present	13	1	3	9	7.69
Total			74	18	12	44	24.32

- Initially caretaker and appointed permanently on 23 September 2022

== Honours ==
Livingston

- 2009–10 Scottish Third Division
- 2010–11 Scottish Second Division

Raith Rovers

- Scottish Challenge Cup: 2013–14
