= Lewis Milne =

Scottish footballer

Personal information
- Date of birth: 26 April 1994 (age 32)
- Place of birth: Edinburgh, Scotland
- Height: 1.76 m (5 ft 9 in)
- Position: Midfielder

Team information
- Current team: Brechin City
- Number: 18

Youth career
- 2006–2008: Dunfermline Athletic
- 2008–2012: Cowdenbeath

Senior career*
Years	Team	Apps	(Gls)
2011–2016	Cowdenbeath	97	(10)
2016–2017	Forfar Athletic	31	(8)
2017	Forfar Athletic	3	(0)
2018	Montrose	16	(11)
2018–2019	Raith Rovers	14	(0)
2019–2023	Montrose	99	(13)
2023–	Stirling Albion	38	(0)
2024–	→ Brechin City (loan)		
- * Club domestic league appearances and goals as of 19 October 2024

Lewis Milner (born 26 April 1994) is a Scottish footballer who plays as a midfielder for Lowland League East club Brechin City on loan from Stirling Albion. Milne has previously played for Cowdenbeath, Forfar Athletic, Raith Rovers and Montrose.

== Career ==
Born in Edinburgh, Milner began his footballing career at Dunfermline Athletic, playing for the club's youth setup in 2007–08 season. He then signed with Cowdenbeath in October 2008, playing in their youth setup and signing a professional deal in July 2010. On 7 May 2011 he made his first team debut, playing the last 24 minutes in a 0–3 away loss against Ross County. In March 2012 Milner signed a new two-year deal with Cowdenbeath. He scored his first professional goal on 6 October, in a 1–1 away draw against Livingston.

After 8 years at Central Park, Milner signed for Forfar Athletic in June 2016. Milner spent one season with Forfar, before deciding to move to Australia. Milner returned from Australia in November 2017, signing a short-term deal with Forfar. After this expired, he moved to Angus rivals Montrose at the beginning of January 2018.

Milne left Montrose to go full-time with Raith Rovers, but he did not hold down a regular first-team place with the Kirkcaldy club. He returned to Montrose in January 2019.

On 5 November 2024, Milne joined Brechin City on loan until the end of the 2024–25 season.
