= Stephen Finnie =

Scottish football referee

- Full name: Stephen Finnie
- Born: October 13, 1969 (age 57); Scotland

Domestic
Years	League	Role
1994-2018	Scottish Football Association	Referee
2004-2013	SFL / SPL	Referee
2013-2018	SPFL	Referee

Stephen Finnie (born 13 October 1969) is a Scottish former football referee.
