= Kevin Clancy =

Scottish football referee

- Full name: Kevin Gerrard Clancy
- Born: 23 November 1983 (age 42)
- Other occupation: Solicitor

Domestic
Years	League	Role
2000–	SPFL	Referee

International
Years	League	Role
2012–	FIFA listed	Referee

Kevin Clancy (born 23 November 1983) is a Scottish football referee who has been on the international list of FIFA referees since January 2012 after attending a course at UEFA's Centre of Refereeing Excellence.

== Career ==
In a match between Celtic and Rangers in 2019, Clancy failed to disallow a goal scored by Celtic after the ball struck Celtic striker Edouard's hand before ending up in the net. During the same game Clancy was criticised for a lack of consistency in making decisions, awarding Celtic a penalty for a shirt pull in the box but failing to award Rangers a penalty for a similar type of foul. Clancy subsequently sent off Rangers striker Alfredo Morelos for an apparent dive. Following the match Clancy admitted that he had made mistakes.

In the lead up to the new season in 2020 Clancy made the controversial statement that referees "knew exactly what's at stake" with regard to decisions made affecting the outcome of the league.

Clancy was criticised following a match between Rangers and Celtic in April 2023 when he disallowed a goal scored by Rangers striker Alfredo Morelos when replays showed that Morelos had been fouled in the lead up to the goal. Former referee Dermot Gallagher stated that Celtic were "very, very lucky" to have the goal disallowed and Sky Sports commentators stating "that's not even a foul" after viewing the replays of the incident.

In a match between Aberdeen and Rangers in 2022, Clancy was criticised for sending off Rangers player Ryan Kent. During the same game Clancy controversially awarded Aberdeen a penalty for a hand ball.

Clancy took charge of the Uefa conference league playoff match between Partizan and Nordsjaelland in December 2023.
