= Craig Charleston =

Scottish football referee

- Full name: Craig Charleston
- Born: May 8, 1970 (age 56); Scotland

Domestic
Years	League	Role
1997-	Scottish Football Association	Referee
2005-2013	SFL	Referee
2012-2013	Scottish Premier League	Referee
2013-	SPFL	Referee

Craig Charleston (born 8 May 1970) is a Scottish football referee.
