= Crawford Allan =

Scottish football referee

- Full name: Crawford Allan
- Born: May 16, 1967 (age 59); Scotland

Domestic
Years	League	Role
1991–2017	Scottish Football Association	Referee
2002–2013	Scottish Football League	Referee
2005–2013	Scottish Premier League	Referee
2013–2017	Scottish Professional Football League	Referee

Crawford Allan (born 16 May 1967) is a retired Scottish football referee. He was appointed Head of Referee Operations at the Scottish FA, before leaving the role and being succeeded by Willie Collum in July 2024

== Refereeing career ==
Allan, who began his refereeing career in the early nineties, retired from refereeing shortly after his 50th birthday. His final match was a Scottish Premiership game between Hamilton Academical and Dundee at the end of the 2016–17 season.
