= 2007–08 Dundee F.C. season =

Dundee
2007–08 season
- Manager: Alex Rae
- Stadium: Dens Park
- Scottish First Division: 2nd
- Scottish Cup: Quarter-Finals
- Scottish League Cup: Third Round
- Scottish Challenge Cup: First Round
- Top goalscorer: League: McDonald (9); All: McDonald (10)
- Highest home attendance: 8,203 (vs Celtic, 26 September 2007) (SLC)
- Lowest home attendance: 1,471 (vs Ross County, 14 August 2007) (CC)
- Average home league attendance: 4,264
Home colours

The 2007–08 season saw Dundee compete in the Scottish First Division after coming 3rd place the season prior. Dundee finished in 2nd position with 69 points, 7 points behind eventual league winners Hamilton Academical.

== Final league table ==
Pos	Team	Pld	W	D	L	GF	GA	GD	Pts	Promotion, qualification or relegation
1	Hamilton Academical (C, P)	36	23	7	6	62	27	+35	76	Promotion to the Premier League
2	Dundee	36	20	9	7	58	30	+28	69	
3	St Johnstone	36	15	13	8	60	45	+15	58	
4	Queen of the South	36	14	10	12	47	43	+4	52	Qualification for the UEFA Cup second qualifying round (Note: Queen of the South qualified for the UEFA Cup Second Qualifying Round as Scottish Cup runners-up)
5	Dunfermline Athletic	36	13	12	11	36	41	−5	51	

Source: BBC Sport
Rules for classification: 1) points; 2) goal difference; 3) number of goals scored.
(C) Champions; (P) Promoted

== Results ==
Dundee's score comes first

=== Legend ===
Win	Draw	Loss

=== Scottish First Division ===
Match	Date	Opponent	Venue	Result	Attendance	Scorers
1	4 August 2007	Livingston	A	2–0	2,872	Robertson (2) 17', 58'
2	11 August 2007	Queen of the South	H	2–1	4,023	Davidson (2) 13' (pen), 75'
3	18 August 2007	St Johnstone	A	1–1	6,079	Daquin 77', Žemlík (red card) 90'
4	25 August 2007	Partick Thistle	H	3–0	4,354	Swankie 8', Davidson 16', McDonald 56'
5	1 September 2007	Clyde	A	2–1	1,606	McHale 52', O'Brien 64'
6	15 September 2007	Dunfermline Athletic	H	1–1	5,173	McDonald 23'
7	22 September 2007	Stirling Albion	A	2–2	1,595	Davidson 32', Páleník 69'
8	29 September 2007	Greenock Morton	H	2–1	3,952	Páleník 2', Šturm 74'
9	6 October 2007	Hamilton Academical	A	0–2	3,197	
10	20 October 2007	Livingston	H	4–1	3,639	Davidson (2) 20', 68', Žemlík 61', Lyle 73'
11	27 October 2006	Partick Thistle	A	1–1	2,589	Lyle 55' (pen)
12	3 November 2007	St Johnstone	H	2–1	5,518	Davidson 59', McDonald 90'
13	11 November 2007	Clyde	A	0–1	3,727	
14	24 November 2007	Hamilton Academical	H	1–0	4,375	Robertson 12'
16	1 December 2007	Dunfermline Athletic	A	1–0	4,113	McDonald 72'
17	8 December 2007	Stirling Albion	H	3–1	3,590	Robertson 56', McDonald 60', Lyle 66'
18	15 December 2007	Greenock Morton	A	2–0	2,526	McDonald 13', Lyle 89'
19	26 December 2007	Queen of the South	A	1–2	1,980	Lyle (red card) 7', Páleník 20'
20	29 December 2007	Partick Thistle	H	1–0	4,548	McDonald 90'
21	2 January 2008	St Johnstone	A	1–1	6,072	McDonald 49'
15	5 January 2008	Dunfermline Athletic	H	0–0	4,607	
22	19 January 2008	Clyde	A	1–1	1,328	Páleník 90'
23	26 January 2008	Queen of the South	H	2–3	3,926	McMenamin (2) 9', 90'
24	9 February 2008	Livingston	A	1–1	2,500	Antoine-Curier 44' (pen), Páleník (red card) 86'
25	16 February 2008	Greenock Morton	H	2–0	4,103	Antoine-Curier 6', Swankie 8'
26	23 February 2008	Stirling Albion	A	6–1	1,430	Antoine-Curier (2) 14', 57', McMenamin 36', Ellis 49' (og), Davidson 66', Lyle 78'
27	1 March 2008	St Johnstone	H	3–2	6,192	Antoine-Curier 40', McMenamin (2) 74', 90'
28	11 March 2008	Livingston	H	2–0	3,715	Antoine-Curier (2) 48', 61'
29	15 March 2008	Hamilton Academical	A	0–1	5,078	Antoine-Curier (red card) 52'
31	22 March 2008	Dunfermline Athletic	A	1–0	3,972	Daquin 50'
30	29 March 2008	Clyde	H	2–0	4,037	O'Brien 8', McDonald 73'
33	1 April 2008	Partick Thistle	A	0–1	2,426	
32	5 April 2008	Greenock Morton	A	2–1	3,478	Antoine-Curier 25', Lyle 80'
34	12 April 2008	Stirling Albion	H	3–0	4,129	MacKenzie 55', Swankie 58', Robertson 90'
35	19 April 2008	Queen of the South	A	0–1	3,005	
36	26 April 2008	Hamilton Academical	H	1–1	3,146	McMenamin 90'

=== Scottish Cup ===
Match	Date	Opponent	Venue	Result	Attendance	Scorers
R4	15 January 2008	Huntly	A	3–1	2,113	McDonald 29', Malone 81', Daquin 90'
R5	11 February 2008	Motherwell	A	2–1	5,733	McHale 49', Robertson 55', McDonald (red card) 83', MacKenzie (red card) 88'
QF	8 March 2008	Queen of the South	A	0–2	6,278	

=== Scottish League Cup ===
Match	Date	Opponent	Venue	Result	Attendance	Scorers
R1	7 August 2007	Greenock Morton	H	2–0	2,942	Žemlík 47', Swankie 52'
R2	28 August 2007	Livingston	H	2–2 (6–5 on pens)	2,355	Robertson 33', Lyle 86' (pen)
R3	26 September 2007	Celtic	H	1–2	8,203	Robertson 71'

=== Scottish Challenge Cup ===
Match	Date	Opponent	Venue	Result	Attendance	Scorers
R1	14 August 2007	Ross County	H	1–2	1,471	Šturm 59', O'Brien (red card) 90'
