= 2007–08 Livingston F.C. season =

Livingston F.C.
2007–08 season
- Manager: Mark Proctor
- Stadium: Almondvale Stadium
- Scottish First Division: 7th
- Scottish Cup: Fifth round
- League Cup: Second round
- Challenge Cup: First round
- Top goalscorer: Dorrans (11)

Season 2007–08 saw Livingston compete in the First Division. They also competed in the Challenge Cup, League Cup and the Scottish Cup.

== Results & fixtures ==
Win Draw Loss

=== First Division ===
4 August 2007	Livingston	0–2	Dundee	Almondvale Stadium
15:00	Dorrans (yellow card) 62' (red card); Hamill (red card) 85'	BBC Report	Robertson 17', 58'	Attendance: 2,872; Referee: Somers

11 August 2007	Partick Thistle	3–0	Livingston	Firhill Stadium
15:00	Strachan 18', 24'; Buchanan 55'	Herald Report Liv Mad Report		Attendance: 2,650; Referee: Smith

19 August 2007	Livingston	1–1	Dunfermline Athletic	Almondvale Stadium
15:00	Mackay 81' (pen.)	BBC Report	O Morrison 89'; Bamba (yellow card) 81' (red card)	Attendance: 2,494; Referee: Boyle

25 August 2007	Queen of the South	1–0	Livingston	Palmerston Park
15:00	Noubissie 54' (o.g.)	Liv Mad Report		Attendance: 1,830; Referee: Tumilty

1 September 2007	Stirling Albion	3–3	Livingston	Forthbank Stadium
15:00	Tinkler 64' (o.g.); McKenna 66', 75'	Liv Mad Report	Pesir 33'; Dorrans 54'; Snodgrass 89'	Attendance: 972; Referee: McCurry

15 September 2007	Livingston	4–0	Greenock Morton	Almondvale Stadium
15:00	Fox 9'; Dorrans 41', 42'; Mackay 67' (pen.)	BBC Report		Attendance: 2,500; Referee: O'Reilly

22 September 2007	Hamilton Academical	1–1	Livingston	New Douglas Park
15:00	Taylor 37'	Liv Mad Report	Craig 54'	Attendance: 1,835; Referee: Dougal

29 September 2007	Livingston	4–2	Clyde	Almondvale Stadium
15:00	Pesir 23'; Mackay 42' (pen.); Snodgrass (red card) 52'; Craig 64'; Fox 65'	BBC Report	McGowan 15'; Ruari MacLennan (red card) 42'; Imrie 85' (pen.); Smith (red card) 88'	Attendance: 1,500; Referee: Tumilty

6 October 2007	Livingston	0–2	St Johnstone	Almondvale Stadium
15:00		BBC Report	Deuchar 62'; Jackson 77'	Attendance: 1,780; Referee: Boyd

19 October 2007	Dundee	4–1	Livingston	Dens Park
15:00	Davidson 20', 68'; Zemlik 61'; Lyle 73'	BBC Report	Pesir 14'	Attendance: 3,639; Referee: MacKay

27 October 2007	Livingston	2–2	Queen of the South	Almondvale Stadium
15:00	Dorrans 21'; Pesir 54'	Liv Mad Report	O'Connor 17'; Dobbie 56'	Attendance: 721; Referee: Clark

3 November 2007	Dunfermline Athletic	0–4	Livingston	East End Park
15:00		BBC Report	Craig 44', 49'; Tinkler 66'; Kennedy 90'	Attendance: 3,473; Referee: Muir

10 November 2007	Livingston	4–3	Stirling Albion	Almondvale Stadium
15:00	Dorrans 24', 34', 74'; Mackay 33'	BBC Report	Bell 46'; McBride 52'; Cramb 53'; Harris (red card) 80'	Attendance: 2,021; Referee: Norris

14 November 2007	Livingston	0–4	Partick Thistle	Almondvale Stadium
19:45		BBC Report	Chaplain 6'; Buchanan 39', 62'; Roberts 79'	Attendance: 2,018; Referee: Underhill

1 December 2007	Greenock Morton	2–2	Livingston	Cappielow
15:00	Millar 7'; Russell 38'	BBC Report	Dorrans 10'; Kennedy 42'	Attendance: 2,132; Referee: Boyle

8 December 2007	Livingston	2–0	Hamilton Academical	Almondvale Stadium
15:00	Snodgrass 52', 70'	Liv Mad Report		Attendance: 1,618; Referee: Freeland

15 December 2007	Clyde	2–1	Livingston	Broadwood Stadium
15:00	McKeown 43'; McGregor 75'	BBC Report	Dorrans 8'	Attendance: 910; Referee: Collum

22 December 2007	St Johnstone	5–2	Livingston	McDiarmid Park
15:00	Jackson 22', 73'; Craig 41'; Quinn 56'; MacDonald 78'	Liv Mad Report	McMenamin 14'; Pešír 90'	Attendance: 2,217; Referee: Thomson

29 December 2007	Queen of the South	1–0	Livingston	Palmerston Park
15:00	O'Neill 83'	BBC Report		Attendance: 1,719; Referee: Finnie

2 January 2008	Livingston	0–2	Dunfermline Athletic	Almondvale Stadium
15:00		BBC Report	Hamilton 9'; Burchill 10'	Attendance: 2,300; Referee: Somers

5 January 2008	Livingston	6–1	Greenock Morton	Almondvale Stadium
15:00	Mackay 17' (pen.); Pešír 36', 58'; Walker 71'; McMenamin 76'; Griffiths 88'	Morton Report	Russell 89' (pen.)	Attendance: 1,800; Referee: MacDonald

19 January 2008	Stirling Albion	1–4	Livingston	Forthbank Stadium
15:00	Partaalu 28'	BBC Report	Dorans 35'; Craig 39'; Snodgrass 58', 65'	Attendance: 848; Referee: Boyle

9 February 2008	Livingston	1–1	Dundee	Almondvale Stadium
15:00	Snodgrass 26'	BBC Report	Antione-Curier 44' (pen.)	Attendance: 2,500; Referee: MacDonald

23 February 2008	Hamilton Academical	3–1	Livingston	New Douglas Park
15:00	Stevenson 7'; Stewart 49' (o.g.); McLaughlin 64'	BBC Report	Snodgrass 70'	Attendance: 1,800; Referee: Dougal

1 March 2008	Livingston	1–1	Dundee	Almondvale Stadium
15:00	Burke 12'	BBC Report	Dorrans 23'	Attendance: 3,268; Referee: Collum

4 March 2008	Partick Thistle	2–1	Livingston	Firhill Stadium
19:30	McKeown 14'; Gray 62'	Liv Mad Report	Griffiths 36'	Attendance: 1,372; Referee: Allan

8 March 2008	Livingston	0–0	Clyde	Almondvale Stadium
15:00		Liv Mad Report		Attendance: 1,524; Referee: Nicholls

11 March 2008	Dundee	2–0	Livingston	Dens Park
19:30	Antione-Curier 48', 61'	BBC Report		Attendance: 3,715; Referee: MacDonald

15 March 2008	Livingston	0–2	St Johnstone	Almondvale Stadium
15:00		BBC Report	Quinn 24', 56'	Attendance: 1,543; Referee: Conroy

22 March 2008	Greenock Morton	1–1	Livingston	Cappielow
15:00	McAlistair 30'	BBC Report	Snodgrass 59'	Attendance: 2,345; Referee: Hornby

29 March 2008	Livingston	2–1	Stirling Albion	Almondvale Stadium
15:00	Snodgrass 36'; Griffiths 47'	BBC Report	Rodriguez 14'	Attendance: 1,148; Referee: Muir

1 April 2008	Livingston	1–0	Queen of the South	Almondvale Stadium
19:45	Griffiths 85'	BBC Report	Burns (red card) 90'	Attendance: 1,152; Referee: Norris

5 April 2008	Clyde	3–2	Livingston	Broadwood Stadium
15:00	Clarke 19'; MacLennan 24', 48'	Liv Mad Report	Weir 28'; Tinkler 71'	Attendance: 1,156; Referee: Boyd

12 April 2008	Livingston	3–1	Hamilton Academical	Almondvale Stadium
15:00	Mackay 86' (pen.)	Liv Mad Report	Offiong 25'; McArthur 39'; Mensing 47'	Attendance: 2,110; Referee: Brown

19 April 2008	Livingston	1–0	Partick Thistle	Almondvale Stadium
15:00	Fox 30'	Liv Mad Report		Attendance: 1,575; Referee: Law

26 April 2008	St Johnstone	5–2	Livingston	McDiarmid Park
15:00	Moon 45'; Sheerin 57' (pen.), 60' (pen.); Milne 64', 81'	BBC Report	Griffiths 63'; Davidson 80'	Attendance: 2,751; Referee: Somers

=== Challenge Cup ===
14 August 2007 First round	Greenock Morton	1–0	Livingston	Cappielow
19:45	Graham 26'	BBC Report		Attendance: 1,658; Referee: Conroy

=== League Cup ===
7 August 2007 First round	Livingston	5–0	Ayr United	Almondvale Stadium
19:30	Snodgrass 36'; Mackay 39', 83' (pen.); Lowing 75' (o.g.)	BBC Report		Attendance: 1,300; Referee: Collum

28 August 2007 Second round	Dundee	2–2 (a.e.t.) (6–5 p)	Livingston	Dens Park
19:45	Robertson 33'; Lyle 86' (pen.)	BBC Report	Mitchell 8'; Craig 49'	Attendance: 2,355; Referee: MacKay

=== Scottish Cup ===
24 November 2007 Third round	Livingston	4–0	Alloa Athletic	Almondvale Stadium
15:00	Raliukonis 33'; MacKay 57' (pen.) 66'; Jacobs 63'	BBC Report		Attendance: 819; Referee: Brines

15 January 2008 Fourth round	Livingston	2–0	Cowdenbeath	Almondvale Stadium
19:45	Craig 4'; McMenamin 31'	BBC Report		Attendance: 830; Referee: Freeland

2 February 2008 Fifth round	Livingston	0–0	Partick Thistle	Almondvale Stadium
15:00		BBC Report		Attendance: 2,110; Referee: Clark

12 February 2008 Fifth round replay	Partick Thistle	1–1 (a.e.t.) (5–4 p)	Livingston	Firhill Stadium
19:45	Twaddle 83'	BBC Report	Dorrans 41'	Attendance: 2,554; Referee: Clark

== League table ==
Pos	Team	Pld	W	D	L	GF	GA	GD	Pts	Promotion, qualification or relegation
5	Dunfermline Athletic	36	13	12	11	36	41	−5	51	
6	Partick Thistle	36	11	12	13	40	39	+1	45	
7	Livingston	36	10	9	17	55	66	−11	39	
8	Greenock Morton	36	9	10	17	40	58	−18	37	
9	Clyde	36	9	10	17	40	59	−19	37	Qualification for the First Division Play-offs (Note: The 9th placed team were entered into a play-off with the Second Division's 2nd, 3rd and 4th placed teams. The winning team were awarded a place in the 2008–09 First Division, Clyde won the play-off to stay in the division.)

Source: BBC Sport
Rules for classification: 1) points; 2) goal difference; 3) number of goals scored.
