= 2006–07 Dundee F.C. season =

Dundee
2006–07 season
- Manager: Alex Rae
- Stadium: Dens Park
- Scottish First Division: 3rd
- Scottish Cup: Third Round
- Scottish League Cup: First Round
- Scottish Challenge Cup: First Round
- Top goalscorer: League: Lyle (12); All: Lyle (15)
- Highest home attendance: 5,538 (vs St Johnstone, 30 September 2006) (SFD)
- Lowest home attendance: 2,180 (vs Partick Thistle, 8 August 2006) (SLC)
- Average home league attendance: 3,880
Home colours

The 2006–07 season saw Dundee compete in the Scottish First Division after coming 7th place the season prior. Dundee finished in 3rd position with 53 points.

== Final league table ==
Pos	Team	Pld	W	D	L	GF	GA	GD	Pts	Promotion, qualification or relegation
1	Gretna (C, P)	36	19	9	8	70	40	+30	66	Promotion to the Premier League
2	St Johnstone	36	19	8	9	65	42	+23	65	
3	Dundee	36	16	5	15	48	42	+6	53	
4	Hamilton Academical	36	14	11	11	46	47	−1	53	
5	Clyde	36	11	14	11	46	35	+11	47	

Source: "2006-2007 First Division - SPFL Archive". SPFL.
Rules for classification: 1) points; 2) goal difference; 3) number of goals scored.
(C) Champions; (P) Promoted

== Results ==
Dundee's score comes first

=== Legend ===
Win	Draw	Loss

=== Scottish First Division ===
Match	Date	Opponent	Venue	Result	Attendance	Scorers
1	5 August 2006	Partick Thistle	H	0–1	5,144	
2	12 August 2006	Hamilton Academical	A	0–1	1,517	
3	20 August 2006	Clyde	H	3–0	3,417	Harris 10', Lyle 42' (pen), Swankie 48'
4	26 August 2006	Livingston	H	0–1	4,059	
5	9 September 2006	Gretna	A	4–0	1,556	Lyle 9', Rae 18', McLaren 24', McDonald 40'
6	16 September 2006	Queen of the South	H	2–1	3,745	Mann 4', Lyle 47' (pen)
7	23 September 2006	Airdrie United	A	1–0	1,249	Lyle 25' (pen)
8	30 September 2006	St Johnstone	H	1–1	5,538	Lynch (red card) 7', McLaren 71'
9	14 October 2006	Ross County	A	0–1	2,454	
10	21 October 2006	Hamilton Academical	H	1–1	3,851	Strong 55'
11	28 October 2006	Partick Thistle	A	1–3	2,987	Rae 28', (red card) 28'
12	4 November 2006	Gretna	H	1–3	3,938	McGinty 28', McLaren (red card) 67'
13	11 November 2006	Livingston	A	3–2	1,868	Swankie (2) 15', 77', Lyle 63'
14	18 November 2006	Queen of the South	A	0–2	1,861	
16	25 November 2006	Airdrie United	H	1–0	3,528	Smith 37'
17	2 December 2006	Ross County	H	3–1	3,380	Rae 73', Lyle 77', McLaren 84'
18	9 December 2006	St Johnstone	A	1–2	4,127	Swankie 14'
15	16 December 2006	Clyde	A	1–2	1,088	Swankie 87' (pen), McLaren (red card) 87'
19	26 December 2006	Partick Thistle	H	3–1	4,113	Deasley (2) 21', 33', Swankie 62'
20	30 December 2006	Gretna	A	0–1	1,541	
21	2 January 2007	Livingston	H	2–0	3,804	Mackay 46' (og), Robertson 82'
22	20 January 2007	Queen of the South	H	1–0	3,360	Lyle 48'
23	27 January 2007	Ross County	A	0–0	2,175	
24	3 February 2007	Airdrie United	A	3–0	1,404	Lyle (2) 36', 65', Robertson 65'
25	10 February 2007	St Johnstone	H	2–1	5,145	Lyle 64' (pen), Swankie 81'
26	17 February 2007	Clyde	H	1–4	3,812	Hamdaoui 83'
27	24 February 2007	Hamilton Academical	A	0–1	1,439	
28	3 March 2007	Livingston	A	3–1	1,980	Davidson (2) 65' (pen), 80', McDonald 89'
29	11 March 2007	Gretna	H	0–1	3,928	
31	17 March 2007	Queen of the South	A	2–2	1,967	Daal 31', Davidson 56'
30	25 March 2007	St Johnstone	A	0–2	3,523	
33	1 April 2007	Airdrie United	H	2–1	2,837	Daal (2) 28', 56'
32	7 April 2007	Ross County	H	3–2	3,013	Daal (2) 20', 32', McHale 54'
34	14 April 2007	Partick Thistle	A	1–2	2,433	Lyle 22', Rae (red card) 90'
35	21 April 2007	Hamilton Academical	H	1–0	3,221	Lyle 62' (pen), Smith (red card) 75'
36	29 April 2006	Clyde	A	1–1	1,582	Clark 21', Lyle (red card) 76'

=== Scottish Cup ===
Match	Date	Opponent	Venue	Result	Attendance	Scorers
R3	6 January 2007	Queen of the South	H	1–1	2,681	Lyle 37'
R3(r)	16 January 2007	Queen of the South	A	3–3 (2–4 on pens)	2,037	Lyle (2) 48', 87', Deasley 82'

=== Scottish League Cup ===
Match	Date	Opponent	Venue	Result	Attendance	Scorers
R1	8 August 2006	Partick Thistle	H	1–3	2,180	Swankie 10'

=== Scottish Challenge Cup ===
Match	Date	Opponent	Venue	Result	Attendance	Scorers
R1	15 August 2006	Forfar Athletic	A	1–2	840	Swankie 90'
