= 2005–06 Dundee F.C. season =

Dundee
2005–06 season
- Manager: Alan Kernaghan
- Stadium: Dens Park
- Scottish First Division: 7th
- Scottish Cup: Semi-Finals
- Scottish League Cup: Second Round
- Scottish Challenge Cup: Quarter-Finals
- Top goalscorer: League: Simon Lynch (13); All: Simon Lynch (18)
- Highest home attendance: 7,460 (vs Hamilton Accies, 9 March 2006) (SC)
- Lowest home attendance: 1,841 (vs Brechin City, 11 April 2006) (SFD)
- Average home league attendance: 3,797
Home colours

The 2005–06 season saw Dundee compete in the Scottish First Division after being relegated the season prior. Dundee finished in 7th position with 43 points, the lowest position the club has ever finished in. The club made it to the semi-finals of the Scottish Cup, before falling to Second Division side Gretna.

== Final league table ==
Pos	Team	Pld	W	D	L	GF	GA	GD	Pts	Promotion, qualification or relegation
5	Clyde	36	15	10	11	54	42	+12	55	
6	Airdrie United	36	11	12	13	57	43	+14	45	
7	Dundee	36	9	16	11	43	50	−7	43	
8	Queen of the South	36	7	12	17	31	54	−23	33	
9	Stranraer (R)	36	5	14	17	33	53	−20	29	Qualification for the First Division Play-offs

Source: "2005-2006 First Division - SPFL Archive". SPFL.
Rules for classification: 1) points; 2) goal difference; 3) number of goals scored.
(R) Relegated

== Results ==
Dundee's score comes first

=== Legend ===
Win	Draw	Loss

=== Scottish First Division ===
Match	Date	Opponent	Venue	Result	Attendance	Scorers
1	6 August 2005	St Mirren	H	3–2	5,011	Mann 10', Lynch 77', McManus 83'
2	13 August 2005	Clyde	A	1–1	1,645	Lynch 61'
3	20 August 2005	Queen of the South	H	3–1	4,257	Mann 25', Lynch 35', Anderson 62'
4	27 August 2005	Hamilton Academical	A	1–1	2,091	Lynch 36'
5	10 September 2005	Airdrie United	H	0–2	4,198	
6	17 September 2005	St Johnstone	A	1–1	5,172	Craig 10'
7	24 September 2005	Ross County	H	0–0	4,025	
8	1 October 2005	Brechin City	A	3–1	2,022	Lynch (2) 14', 34', Craig 30'
9	15 October 2005	Stranraer	H	1–1	3,417	Ferguson 82'
10	22 October 2005	St Mirren	A	0–0	4,027	
11	26 October 2005	Clyde	H	3–3	3,360	Lynch 22', McManus (2) 42', 51'
12	29 October 2005	Airdrie United	A	0–4	1,656	
13	12 November 2005	St Johnstone	H	2–1	5,383	Lynch 18' (pen), McManus 73'
14	15 November 2005	Hamilton Academical	H	1–1	3,890	Craig 87'
15	19 November 2005	Ross County	A	0–3	2,826	
16	26 November 2005	Brechin City	H	1–0	3,278	Lynch 73' (pen)
17	3 December 2005	Stranraer	A	0–0	482	
18	10 December 2005	St Mirren	H	4–0	4,202	McDonald 3', O'Reilly (2) 72', 76', Ferguson 82'
19	26 December 2005	Airdrie United	H	2–3	4,378	O'Reilly 22', Mann 45'
20	31 December 2005	Hamilton Academical	A	0–0	1,533	
21	2 January 2006	St Johnstone	A	0–0	5,170	
22	14 January 2006	Ross County	H	0–0	3,671	
23	21 January 2006	Brechin City	A	3–0	1,521	McDonald 19', Dixon 53', Lynch 62' (pen)
24	28 January 2006	Stranraer	H	2–1	3,134	Deasley 7', Lynch 65'
25	11 February 2006	Queen of the South	H	2–3	3,365	Lynch (2) 37', 58'
26	18 February 2006	Clyde	A	3–3	1,062	McManus (2) 4', 48, Marshall 26'
27	28 February 2006	Queen of the South	A	0–0	1,566	
28	4 March 2006	Hamilton Academical	H	2–4	3,540	Wilkie 85', Robertson 88'
29	11 March 2006	Airdrie United	A	0–7	1,127	
30	18 March 2006	St Johnstone	H	0–1	4,193	
31	4 April 2006	Ross County	A	0–0	1,754	
32	8 April 2006	Stranraer	A	1–1	400	McDonald 42'
33	11 April 2006	Brechin City	H	0–1	1,841	
34	15 April 2006	St Mirren	A	1–2	7,629	Craig 46'
35	22 April 2006	Clyde	H	0–1	3,199	
36	29 April 2006	Queen of the South	A	3–1	2,624	Craig (2) 25', 29', Dixon 26'

=== Scottish Cup ===
Match	Date	Opponent	Venue	Result	Attendance	Scorers
R3	8 January 2006	Stranraer	H	2–0	2,580	O'Reilly 46', Lynch 79'
R4	4 February 2006	Airdrie United	A	1–1	3,557	Deasley 21'
R4(r)	14 February 2006	Airdrie United	H	2–0	3,824	Deasley 8', Lynch 71'
QF	25 February 2006	Hamilton Academical	A	0–0	4,486	
QF(r)	9 March 2006	Hamilton Academical	H	3–2 (AET)	7,460	Mann 56', Lynch 68', Craig 91'
SF	1 April 2006	Gretna	N	0–3	14,179	

=== Scottish League Cup ===
Match	Date	Opponent	Venue	Result	Attendance	Scorers
R2	23 August 2005	Stranraer	A	1–3	668	Lynch 72'

=== Scottish Challenge Cup ===
Match	Date	Opponent	Venue	Result	Attendance	Scorers
R1	31 July 2005	East Stirlingshire	H	2–0	2,554	Anderson 25', Lynch 30'
R2	30 August 2005	Airdrie United	H	1–1 (3–2 on pens)	1,857	Robertson 36'
R3	13 September 2005	Hamilton Academical	A	0–2	609	
