= 2016–17 Raith Rovers F.C. season =

Raith Rovers
2016–17 season
- Chairman: Alan Young
- Manager: Gary Locke (until 7 February 2017); John Hughes (from 10 February 2017)
- Stadium: Stark's Park
- Championship: Ninth Place (Relegated via play-offs)
- Challenge Cup: Third Round
- League Cup: Group stage
- Scottish Cup: Fourth Round
- Highest home attendance: 5,899 v Dunfermline Athletic, League One, 2 January 2017
- Lowest home attendance: 1,147 v Montrose, League Cup, 19 July 2016
- Average home league attendance: 2,631
Home colours	Away colours

The 2016–17 season was Raith Rovers' eighth consecutive season in the second tier of Scottish football having been promoted from the then Scottish Second Division at the end of the 2008–09 season. Raith Rovers also competed in the Challenge Cup, League Cup and the Scottish Cup.

== Summary ==
=== Management ===
Raith were led by manager Gary Locke for the 2016–17 season for his 1st season at the club.

On 7 February 2017 Locke parted company with the club.

3 days later, John Hughes was appointed the new manager.

== Results & fixtures ==
Win Draw Loss Postponed

=== Pre-season ===
28 June 2016 Friendly	Forfar Athletic	2 – 0	Raith Rovers	Station Park
19:45	Cox 34'; Hay 74'	Raith Report		Attendance: 339; Referee: Stephen Finnie

2 July 2016 Friendly	Brechin City	0 – 2	Raith Rovers	Glebe Park
14:00		Raith Report	Johnston 34'; Vaughan 78'	Attendance: 207; Referee: Graham Beaton

5 July 2016 Friendly	Raith Rovers	0 – 0	Partick Thistle	Stark's Park
19:45		Raith Report		Attendance: 813; Referee: Kevin Clancy

9 July 2016 Friendly	Arbroath	0 – 4	Raith Rovers	Gayfield Park
14:00		Raith Report	Vaughan 33'; McHattie 38'; Trialist 46'; Trialist 82'	Attendance: 395; Referee: Craig Charleston

=== Scottish Championship ===
6 August 2016 Championship	Ayr United	0 – 2	Raith Rovers	Somerset Park
15:00		Raith Report	Callachan 19'; Matthews 75'	Attendance: 1,550; Referee: Euan Anderson

13 August 2016 Championship	Raith Rovers	3 – 1	St Mirren	Stark's Park
15:00	McManus 17', 51'; Callachan 50'	Raith Report	Hardie 63'	Attendance: 2,140; Referee: Kevin Graham

20 August 2016 Championship	Raith Rovers	2 – 0	Dunfermline Athletic	Stark's Park
15:00	B.Barr 71'; Stewart 79'	Raith Report		Attendance: 5,114; Referee: Alan Muir

27 August 2016 Championship	Dundee United	2 – 2	Raith Rovers	Tannadice Park
15:00	Flood 17'; C.Smith 23' (pen.)	Raith Report	Thompson 38'; McHattie 72'	Attendance: 7,434; Referee: Craig Thomson

10 September 2016 Championship	Raith Rovers	0 – 2	Falkirk	Stark's Park
15:00		Raith Report	Baird 30'; Taiwo 72'	Attendance: 2,320; Referee: Euan Anderson

17 September 2016 Championship	Queen of the South	3 – 1	Raith Rovers	Palmerston Park
15:00	Dobbie 52', 68'; Brotherston 80'	Raith Report	Mvoto 90'	Attendance: 1,864; Referee: Gavin Duncan

24 September 2016 Championship	Raith Rovers	3 – 2	Dumbarton	Stark's Park
15:00	McHattie 15'; Callachan 34'; Roberts 35'	Raith Report	Stevenson 71'; Thomson 77'; Buchanan (yellow card) 89' (red card)	Attendance: 1,636; Referee: Steven Kirkland

1 October 2016 Championship	Greenock Morton	1 – 0	Raith Rovers	Cappielow
15:00	Forbes 18'	Raith Report		Attendance: 1,528; Referee: Craig Charleston

15 October 2016 Championship	Raith Rovers	0 – 0	Hibernian	Stark's Park
15:00		Raith Report	Bartley (red card) 38'	Attendance: 3,753; Referee: Stephen Finnie

22 October 2016 Championship	Falkirk	2 – 4	Raith Rovers	Falkirk Stadium
15:00	Baird 18'; Miller 75'	Raith Report	Davidson 17'; Stewart 37', 79'; McManus 72'	Attendance: 4,773; Referee: Barry Cook

29 October 2016 Championship	Raith Rovers	1 – 0	Queen of the South	Stark's Park
17:15	Stewart 90'	Raith Report		Attendance: 1,244; Referee: Crawford Allan

5 November 2016 Championship	Dunfermline Athletic	0 – 0	Raith Rovers	East End Park
15:00		Raith Report		Attendance: 5,649; Referee: Craig Thomson

19 November 2016 Championship	Dumbarton	0 – 0	Raith Rovers	Cheaper Insurance Direct Stadium
15:00		Raith Report		Attendance: 600; Referee: Alan Muir

22 November 2016 Championship	Raith Rovers	1 – 1	Ayr United	Stark's Park
19:45	Coustrain 17'; Benedictus (yellow card) 36' (red card)	Raith Report	Cairney (red card) 57'; Harkins 88'	Attendance: 1,241; Referee: Craig Charleston

10 December 2016 Championship	St Mirren	1 – 0	Raith Rovers	Paisley 2021 Stadium
15:00	Morgan 47'	Raith Report		Attendance: 2,630; Referee: Barry Cook

17 December 2016 Championship	Raith Rovers	0 – 0	Dundee United	Stark's Park
15:00		Raith Report	Toshney (yellow card) 55' (red card)	Attendance: 4,361; Referee: Steven Kirkland

24 December 2016 Championship	Hibernian	1 – 1	Raith Rovers	Easter Road
13:00	Boyle 88'	Raith Report	Mvoto 49'	Attendance: 15,409; Referee: Greg Aitken

2 January 2017 Championship	Raith Rovers	0 – 2	Dunfermline Athletic	Stark's Park
15:00		Raith Report	Clark 11'; Ashcroft 77'	Attendance: 5,899; Referee: Don Robertson

7 January 2017 Championship	Raith Rovers	1 – 4	Falkirk	Stark's Park
15:00	Johnston 9'	Raith Report	Hippolyte 16'; McHugh 25'; Sibbald 38', 48'	Attendance: 2,202; Referee: Andrew Dallas

14 January 2017 Championship	Greenock Morton	2 – 0	Raith Rovers	Cappielow
15:00	Forbes 27'; Shankland 67'	Raith Report		Attendance: 1,957; Referee: Gavin Duncan

28 January 2017 Championship	Raith Rovers	1 – 3	Dumbarton	Stark's Park
15:00	Hardie 27'	Raith Report	Nadé 49'; Harvie 57'; Buchanan 63'	Attendance: 1,413; Referee: Mat Northcroft

4 February 2017 Championship	Dundee United	3 – 0	Raith Rovers	Tannadice Park
17:15	Mikkelsen 45', 53'; Andreu 48'	Raith Report		Attendance: 5,232; Referee: Stephen Finnie

7 February 2017 Championship	Raith Rovers	0 – 1	Greenock Morton	Stark's Park
19:45		Raith Report	Kilday 53'	Attendance: 1,161; Referee: Gavin Duncan

18 February 2017 Championship	Raith Rovers	1 – 1	Hibernian	Stark's Park
15:00	Stevenson 52'	Raith Report	Cummings 60'	Attendance: 4,172; Referee: Craig Charleston

25 February 2017 Championship	Queen of the South	2 – 1	Raith Rovers	Palmerston Park
15:00	Rankin 7'; Lyle 36'	Raith Report	Mvoto 60'	Attendance: 1,484; Referee: Barry Cook

28 February 2017 Championship	Ayr United	1 – 0	Raith Rovers	Somerset Park
19:45	El Alagui 62'	Raith Report		Attendance: 1,103; Referee: Willie Collum

8 March 2017 Championship	Raith Rovers	2 – 0	St Mirren	Stark's Park
19:45	Hardie 74', 80'	Raith Report		Attendance: 2,124; Referee: Crawford Allan

11 March 2017 Championship	Dumbarton	4 – 0	Raith Rovers	Cheaper Insurance Direct Stadium
15:00	Thomson 6', 44'; Stanton 47'; Fleming 90'	Raith Report		Attendance: 719; Referee: Alan Newlands

18 March 2017 Championship	Raith Rovers	2 – 1	Dundee United	Stark's Park
15:00	Barr 41'; Hardie 49'	Raith Report	Murray 81'	Attendance: 2,192; Referee: Craig Charleston

25 March 2017 Championship	Raith Rovers	1 – 1	Queen of the South	Stark's Park
15:00	Hardie 10'	Raith Report	Dobbie 24'	Attendance: 1,609; Referee: Colin Steven

1 April 2017 Championship	Falkirk	1 – 0	Raith Rovers	Falkirk Stadium
15:00	Miller 71'	Raith Report		Attendance: 4,823; Referee: Nick Walsh

8 April 2017 Championship	Dunfermline Athletic	1 – 0	Raith Rovers	East End Park
15:00	Higginbotham 49' (pen.)	Raith Report		Attendance: 4,865; Referee: Andrew Dallas

15 April 2017 Championship	Raith Rovers	2 – 0	Greenock Morton	Stark's Park
15:00	Barr 28'; Matthews 59'	Raith Report		Attendance: 1,720; Referee: Alan Newlands

26 April 2017 Championship	Hibernian	3 – 2	Raith Rovers	Easter Road
19:45	Keatings 41', 90'; Holt 81'	Raith Report	McManus 67'; Hardie 85'	Attendance: 13,604; Referee: Greg Aitken

29 April 2017 Championship	St Mirren	5 – 0	Raith Rovers	Paisley 2021 Stadium
15:00	Mallan 27', 59'; McManus 39' (o.g.); Loy 48'; Morgan 87'	Raith Report		Attendance: 4,937; Referee: Kevin Clancy

6 May 2017 Championship	Raith Rovers	2 – 1	Ayr United	Stark's Park
15:00	Penksa (red card) 4'; Court 37'; McManus 90'	Raith Report	Docherty 70'	Attendance: 3,064; Referee: Steven McLean

=== Scottish Championship play-offs ===
10 May 2017 Championship Play-Off Semi-Final 1st Leg	Brechin City	1 – 1	Raith Rovers	Glebe Park
19:45	Caldwell 45' (pen.)	Raith Report	McManus 70'	Attendance: 1,022; Referee: Don Robertson

13 May 2017 Championship Play-Off Semi-Final 2nd Leg	Raith Rovers	3 – 3 (a.e.t.) (4 – 4 agg.) (3 – 4 p)	Brechin City	Stark's Park
15:00	Mvoto 68'; McManus 90+1'; Hardie 101'	Raith Report	Caldwell 51'; Trouten 84'; Watt 115'	Attendance: 2,932; Referee: Alan Muir
	Penalties
	Handling (penalty scored); Thompson (penalty scored); B. Barr (penalty missed); McManus (penalty scored); Robertson (penalty missed)		Dyer (penalty scored); Watt (penalty missed); McLean (penalty missed); Trouten (penalty scored); Love (penalty scored); Jackson (penalty scored)

=== Scottish Challenge Cup ===
3 September 2016 Round 3	Forfar Athletic	3 – 2	Raith Rovers	Station Park
15:00	Milne 31'; Peters 37', 57'	Raith Report	Stewart 19'; McManus 67'	Attendance: 690; Referee: Alan Newlands

=== Scottish League Cup ===
15 July 2016 Group D	Cove Rangers	1 – 2	Raith Rovers	Station Park
19:45	Stott 32'	Raith Report	Benedictus 36'; Vaughan 56'	Attendance: 362; Referee: Graham Beaton

19 July 2016 Group D	Raith Rovers	2 – 1	Montrose	Stark's Park
19:45	Johnston 12'; Vaughan 87' (pen.)	Raith Report	Bolochoweckyj 58'; Templeman (red card) 88'	Attendance: 1,147; Referee: Colin Steven

23 July 2016 Group D	Ross County	1 – 1 (3 – 4 p)	Raith Rovers	Global Energy Stadium
15:00	Graham 75' (pen.)	Raith Report	Čikoš 18' (o.g.)	Attendance: 1,173; Referee: John McKendrick

30 July 2016 Group D	Raith Rovers	0 – 1	Alloa Athletic	Stark's Park
15:00		Raith Report	Spence 34'	Attendance: 1,674; Referee: Kevin Clancy

=== Scottish Cup ===
22 January 2017 Round 4	Raith Rovers	1 – 1	Hearts	Stark's Park
13:05	McManus 89'	Raith Report	Walker 37'	Attendance: 5,036; Referee: John Beaton

25 January 2017 Round 4 Replay	Hearts	4 – 2 (a.e.t.)	Raith Rovers	Tynecastle Stadium
19:45	Currie 35'; Martin 94' (pen.); Walker 105' (pen.); Johnsen 114'	Raith Report	Barr 14'; Hardie 101'	Attendance: 10,740; Referee: John Beaton

=== Fife Cup ===
31 August 2016 Semi-final	Raith Rovers	1 – 1 (5 – 4 p)	Dunfermline Athletic	Stark's Park
19:45	Trialist 59'	Raith Report	El Alagui 28'	Attendance: 500

3 May 2017 Final	Cowdenbeath	2 – 1	Raith Rovers	Stark's Park
19:45	Trialist 48'; Muirhead 54'	Raith Report	Stevenson 82'

== Player statistics ==
=== Squad ===
Last updated 13 May 2017

No.	Pos	Nat	Player	Total		Championship		Championship play-offs		Challenge Cup		League Cup		Scottish Cup	
No.	Pos	Nat	Player	Apps	Goals	Apps	Goals	Apps	Goals	Apps	Goals	Apps	Goals	Apps	Goals
1	GK	(Scotland) SCO	Kevin Cuthbert	23	0	17+0	0	0+0	0	0+0	0	4+0	0	2+0	0
2	DF	(Scotland) SCO	Jason Thomson	30	0	23+0	0	2+0	0	0+0	0	4+0	0	0+1	0
3	DF	(Scotland) SCO	Kevin McHattie	34	2	27+0	2	0+0	0	1+0	0	4+0	0	2+0	0
4	MF	(Scotland) SCO	Ross Callachan	38	3	31+0	3	0+0	0	1+0	0	4+0	0	2+0	0
5	DF	(France) FRA	Jean-Yves Mvoto	41	4	34+0	3	2+0	1	1+0	0	2+0	0	2+0	0
6	DF	(Scotland) SCO	Kyle Benedictus	39	1	30+0	0	2+0	0	1+0	0	4+0	1	2+0	0
7	MF	(Scotland) SCO	Chris Johnston	34	2	20+7	1	0+1	0	0+0	0	3+1	1	1+1	0
8	MF	(Scotland) SCO	Scott Robertson	2	0	0+1	0	0+1	0	0+0	0	0+0	0	0+0	0
9	FW	(Scotland) SCO	Mark Stewart	36	6	12+17	5	0+0	0	1+0	1	1+3	0	2+0	0
10	FW	(Scotland) SCO	Lewis Vaughan	17	2	5+7	0	0+0	0	0+1	0	4+0	2	0+0	0
11	MF	(Scotland) SCO	Bobby Barr	36	2	23+5	1	0+1	0	1+0	0	4+0	0	2+0	1
12	MF	(Scotland) SCO	Ross Matthews	32	2	23+1	2	2+0	0	1+0	0	3+0	0	2+0	0
14	MF	(Scotland) SCO	Iain Davidson	35	1	25+1	1	2+0	0	1+0	0	4+0	0	2+0	0
15	FW	(Ghana) GHA	Yaw Osei	3	0	0+1	0	0+0	0	0+0	0	1+1	0	0+0	0
16	MF	(Republic of Ireland) IRL	Joel Coustrain	9	1	1+5	1	0+0	0	0+1	0	0+2	0	0+0	0
17	GK	(Australia) AUS	Aaron Lennox	2	0	2+0	0	0+0	0	0+0	0	0+0	0	0+0	0
18	MF	(Scotland) SCO	Scott Roberts	19	1	5+12	1	0+0	0	0+0	0	0+2	0	0+0	0
19	MF	(Czech Republic) CZE	Rudi Skácel	29	0	10+14	0	1+0	0	1+0	0	0+1	0	0+2	0
20	FW	(Scotland) SCO	Declan McManus	41	9	28+6	5	2+0	2	1+0	1	2+0	0	1+1	1
21	MF	(Northern Ireland) NIR	Jordan Thompson	32	1	26+3	1	0+1	0	0+0	0	0+0	0	2+0	0
22 (until January 2017)	DF	(Scotland) SCO	David Bates	0	0	0+0	0	0+0	0	0+0	0	0+0	0	0+0	0
22 (from April 2017)	MF	(Scotland) SCO	Danny Handling	7	0	4+1	0	2+0	0	0+0	0	0+0	0	0+0	0
23	GK	(Northern Ireland) NIR	Conor Brennan	11	0	6+2	0	2+0	0	1+0	0	0+0	0	0+0	0
24 (until December 2016)	MF	(Scotland) SCO	Robbie Crawford	0	0	0+0	0	0+0	0	0+0	0	0+0	0	0+0	0
24 (from January 2017)	DF	(Scotland) SCO	David Syme	0	0	0+0	0	0+0	0	0+0	0	0+0	0	0+0	0
25	DF	(Scotland) SCO	Liam Smith	2	0	2+0	0	0+0	0	0+0	0	0+0	0	0+0	0
26	FW	(Scotland) SCO	Jonny Court	6	1	1+3	1	2+0	0	0+0	0	0+0	0	0+0	0
27	MF	(Scotland) SCO	James Berry	0	0	0+0	0	0+0	0	0+0	0	0+0	0	0+0	0
28	MF	(Scotland) SCO	Ryan Stevenson	0	0	0+0	0	0+0	0	0+0	0	0+0	0	0+0	0
29	DF	(Scotland) SCO	David McKay	0	0	0+0	0	0+0	0	0+0	0	0+0	0	0+0	0
30	MF	(Denmark) DEN	Andreas Thorsen	0	0	0+0	0	0+0	0	0+0	0	0+0	0	0+0	0
35	MF	(Scotland) SCO	Kyle Bell	0	0	0+0	0	0+0	0	0+0	0	0+0	0	0+0	0
36	GK	(Slovakia) SVK	Pavol Penksa	10	0	10+0	0	0+0	0	0+0	0	0+0	0		
52	FW	(Scotland) SCO	Ryan Hardie	22	8	11+7	6	1+1	1	0+0	0	0+0	0	0+2	1
55	DF	(Scotland) SCO	Craig Barr	18	2	15+1	2	2+0	0	0+0	0	0+0	0	0+0	0
66	MF	(Scotland) SCO	Ryan Stevenson	9	1	6+3	1	0+0	0	0+0	0	0+0	0	0+0	0
--	MF	(Scotland) SCO	Craig Easton	0	0	0+0	0	0+0	0	0+0	0	0+0	0	0+0	0

=== Disciplinary record ===
Includes all competitive matches.

Last updated May 2017

Nation	Position	Name	Championship		Championship Play-offs		Challenge Cup		League Cup		Scottish Cup		Total	
Nation	Position	Name	Booked	Sent off (straight red)	Booked	Sent off (straight red)	Booked	Sent off (straight red)	Booked	Sent off (straight red)	Booked	Sent off (straight red)	Booked	Sent off (straight red)
(Scotland)	GK	Kevin Cuthbert	0	0	0	0	0	0	0	0	0	0	0	0
(Australia)	GK	Aaron Lennox	0	0	0	0	0	0	0	0	0	0	0	0
(Northern Ireland)	GK	Conor Brennan	0	0	0	0	0	0	0	0	0	0	0	0
(Slovakia)	GK	Pavol Penksa	0	1	0	0	0	0	0	0	0	0	0	1
(Scotland)	DF	Jason Thomson	5	0	0	0	0	0	0	0	1	0	6	0
(Scotland)	DF	David Bates	0	0	0	0	0	0	0	0	0	0	0	0
(Scotland)	DF	Craig Barr	5	0	0	0	0	0	0	0	0	0	5	0
(Scotland)	DF	Kyle Benedictus	7	1	0	0	0	0	0	0	0	0	7	1
(Scotland)	DF	Kevin McHattie	10	0	0	0	1	0	1	0	1	0	13	0
(France)	DF	Jean-Yves Mvoto	2	0	0	0	0	0	0	0	0	0	2	0
(Scotland)	DF	David McKay	0	0	0	0	0	0	0	0	0	0	0	0
(Scotland)	DF	Liam Smith	0	0	0	0	0	0	0	0	0	0	0	0
(Scotland)	DF	David Syme	0	0	0	0	0	0	0	0	0	0	0	0
(Scotland)	MF	Ross Callachan	6	0	0	0	1	0	0	0	0	0	7	0
(Scotland)	MF	Ross Matthews	6	0	0	0	0	0	1	0	0	0	7	0
(Scotland)	MF	Iain Davidson	12	0	1	0	0	0	1	0	0	0	14	0
(Scotland)	MF	Scott Robertson	0	0	0	0	0	0	0	0	0	0	0	0
(Scotland)	MF	Bobby Barr	3	0	0	0	1	0	0	0	1	0	5	0
(Scotland)	MF	James Berry	0	0	0	0	0	0	0	0	0	0	0	0
(Scotland)	MF	Ryan Stevenson	0	0	0	0	0	0	0	0	0	0	0	0
(Scotland)	MF	Chris Johnston	1	0	0	0	0	0	0	0	0	0	1	0
(Republic of Ireland)	MF	Joel Coustrain	0	0	0	0	0	0	0	0	0	0	0	0
(Scotland)	MF	Scott Roberts	1	0	0	0	0	0	0	0	0	0	1	0
(Czech Republic)	MF	Rudi Skácel	8	0	0	0	0	0	0	0	0	0	8	0
(Denmark)	MF	Andreas Thorsen	0	0	0	0	0	0	0	0	0	0	0	0
(Northern Ireland)	MF	Jordan Thompson	6	0	0	0	0	0	0	0	1	0	7	0
(Scotland)	MF	Craig Easton	0	0	0	0	0	0	0	0	0	0	0	0
(Scotland)	MF	Robbie Crawford	0	0	0	0	0	0	0	0	0	0	0	0
(Scotland)	MF	Ryan Stevenson	0	0	0	0	0	0	0	0	0	0	0	0
(Scotland)	MF	Kyle Bell	0	0	0	0	0	0	0	0	0	0	0	0
(Scotland)	MF	Danny Handling	2	0	1	0	0	0	0	0	0	0	3	0
(Scotland)	FW	Lewis Vaughan	0	0	0	0	0	0	0	0	0	0	0	0
(Scotland)	FW	Jonny Court	1	0	0	0	0	0	0	0	0	0	1	0
(Scotland)	FW	Mark Stewart	2	0	0	0	0	0	0	0	0	0	2	0
(Ghana)	FW	Yaw Osei	0	0	0	0	0	0	1	0	0	0	1	0
(Scotland)	FW	Declan McManus	10	0	0	0	1	0	0	0	0	0	11	0
(Scotland)	FW	Ryan Hardie	0	0	0	0	0	0	0	0	0	0	0	0

== Team statistics ==
=== League table ===
Pos	Team	Pld	W	D	L	GF	GA	GD	Pts	Promotion, qualification or relegation
6	Queen of the South	36	11	10	15	46	52	−6	43	
7	St Mirren	36	9	12	15	52	56	−4	39	
8	Dumbarton	36	9	12	15	46	56	−10	39	
9	Raith Rovers (R)	36	10	9	17	35	52	−17	39	Qualification for the Championship play-offs
10	Ayr United (R)	36	7	12	17	33	62	−29	33	Relegation to League One

Source: Soccerway
Rules for classification: 1) Points; 2) Goal difference; 3) Number of goals scored
(R) Relegated

=== Division summary ===
Round	1	2	3	4	5	6	7	8	9	10	11	12	13	14	15	16	17	18	19	20	21	22	23	24	25	26	27	28	29	30	31	32	33	34	35	36
Ground	A	H	H	A	H	A	H	A	H	A	H	A	H	A	H	A	H	A	H	H	A	H	A	H	A	A	H	A	H	H	A	A	H	A	A	H
Result	W	W	W	D	L	L	W	L	D	W	W	D	D	D	L	L	D	D	L	L	L	L	L	D	L	L	W	L	W	D	L	L	W	L	L	W
Position	1	1	1	2	3	3	4	4	5	4	3	3	4	4	8	5	4	5	5	5	6	7	8	8	8	8	7	8	7	7	8	8	7	8	9	9

Updated to match(es) played on 6 May 2017. Source:
A = Away; H = Home; W = Win; D = Draw; L = Loss

=== Management statistics ===
Last updated on 13 May 2017

Name	From	To	P	W	D	L	Win% (Note: Win% is the percentage of matches won rounded to two decimal places.)
Gary Locke	20 May 2016	7 February 2017	30	9	8	13	30.00
John Hughes	10 February 2017	Present	15	4	3	8	26.67
