= Kevin McDonald (footballer, born 1988) =

Scottish footballer

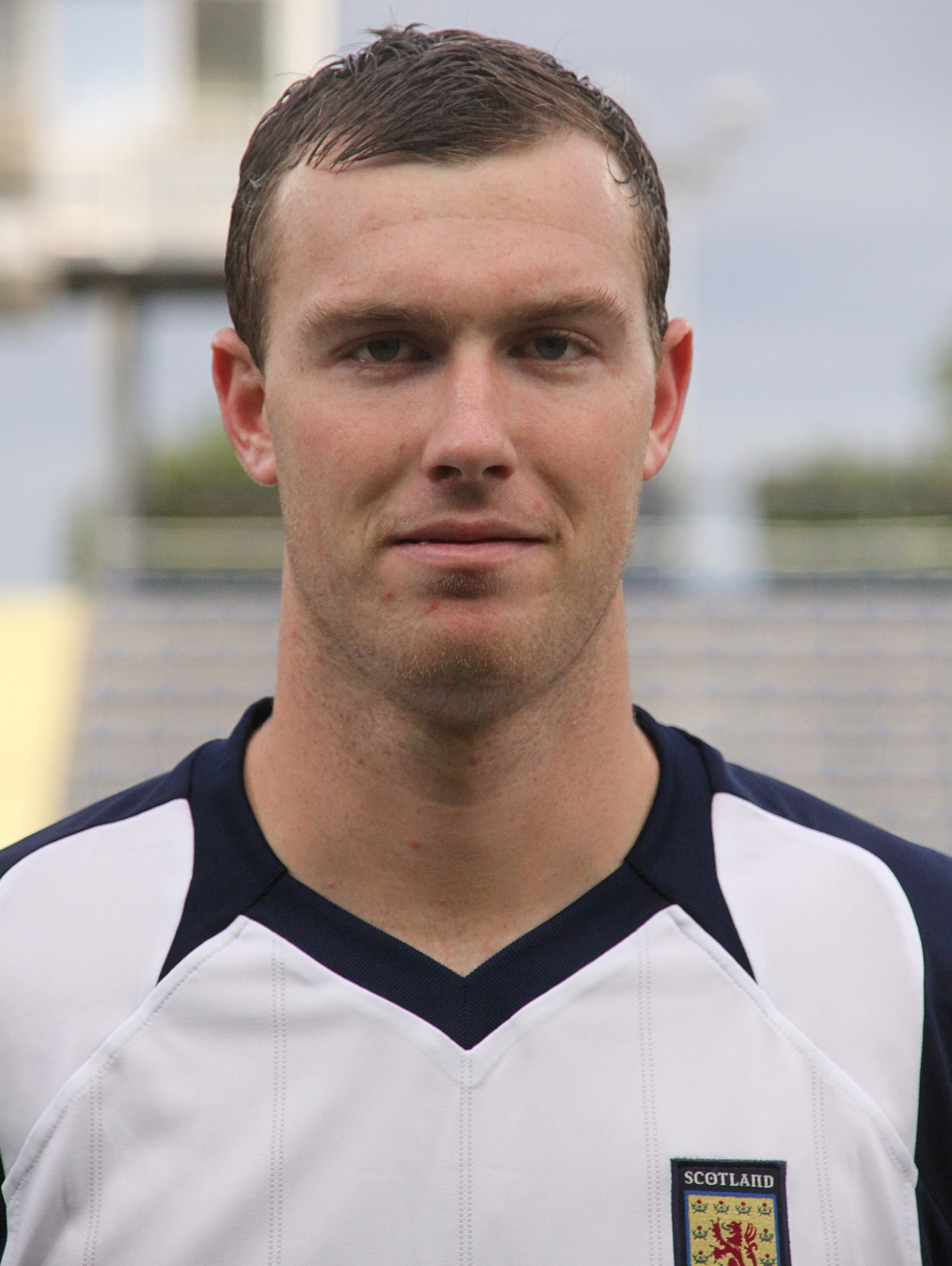
- McDonald lining up for Scotland U21s in 2009

Personal information
- Full name: Kevin David McDonald
- Date of birth: 4 November 1988 (age 38)
- Place of birth: Carnoustie, Scotland
- Height: 6 ft 4 in (1.92 m)
- Position: Midfielder

Senior career*
Years	Team	Apps	(Gls)
2005–2008	Dundee	90	(14)
2008–2011	Burnley	51	(2)
2010	→ Scunthorpe United (loan)	5	(1)
2011	→ Notts County (loan)	11	(0)
2011–2013	Sheffield United	77	(5)
2013–2016	Wolverhampton Wanderers	120	(8)
2016–2021	Fulham	116	(6)
2022	Dundee United	9	(0)
2023	Exeter City	11	(3)
2023–2024	Bradford City	19	(0)
2024–2026	Exeter City	22	(1)

International career^{‡}
2006	Scotland U19	1	(0)
2007–2010	Scotland U21	14	(2)
2018	Scotland	5	(0)

Managerial career
- 2023: Bradford City (caretaker)
- * Club domestic league appearances and goals as of 28 December 2025 (UTC) ‡ National team caps and goals as of 01:26, 7 October 2021 (UTC)

Kevin David McDonald (born 4 November 1988) is a Scottish professional footballer who plays as a midfielder.

He began his career with Dundee before moving to England to sign for Burnley, for whom he played one season in the Premier League. He spent two full seasons with Sheffield United before moving to Wolverhampton Wanderers in 2013 where he spent three seasons. McDonald signed for Fulham in 2016 and made his full international debut for Scotland in March 2018. His career was disrupted by illness, which resulted in him needing a kidney transplant. He left Fulham in 2021 and, after recovering from the operation, he signed for Dundee United.

== Club career ==
=== Dundee ===
Born in Carnoustie, McDonald was initially signed as a youngster by Dundee and worked his way into the first team for the Scottish Championship side. He had been the subject of a £75,000 bid from Celtic in June 2006 which was rejected by Dundee.

By May 2008, Dundee manager Alex Rae told the media that he would let McDonald leave the club if a suitable offer was received. On the same day it was revealed that Dundee had rejected an offer of £250,000 from English Championship side Burnley.

=== Burnley ===
Burnley eventually had a second offer of £500,000 accepted, and McDonald was signed on a three-year deal, scoring his first goal for the club in a 3–0 win over Derby County at the end of November 2008.

In Burnley's 2008–09 League Cup campaign McDonald scored both goals in a 2–0 win over Arsenal at Turf Moor. His second strike against the Gunners was particularly precise, an outside of the right foot strike from the edge of the area.

His career with Burnley suffered after he left the stadium without permission (after being substituted) during a 6–1 defeat against Manchester City in April 2010. Out of the Burnley first team, he signed for Championship rivals Scunthorpe United on a one-month loan in October 2010. This was followed by another loan to League One side Notts County in February 2011, running until the end of the 2010/11 season.

=== Sheffield United ===
At the end of the 2010–11 season McDonald was released by Burnley and undertook a trial with League One Sheffield United leading to a one-year contract with the South Yorkshire club. McDonald made his debut for the Blades against Brentford on 13 August 2011. Initially used as a substitute he gradually became the focus of the team's midfield and a regular starter as the season progressed and the team contested for a promotion place. An injury during the play–off semi-final victory against Stevenage meant that McDonald missed the play-off final, which was lost on penalties to Huddersfield. Out of contract, it was initially uncertain whether he would return to the club, but following negotiations he signed a new two-year contract with Sheffield United at the end of July 2012 whilst in Malta on their pre-season tour.

=== Wolverhampton Wanderers ===
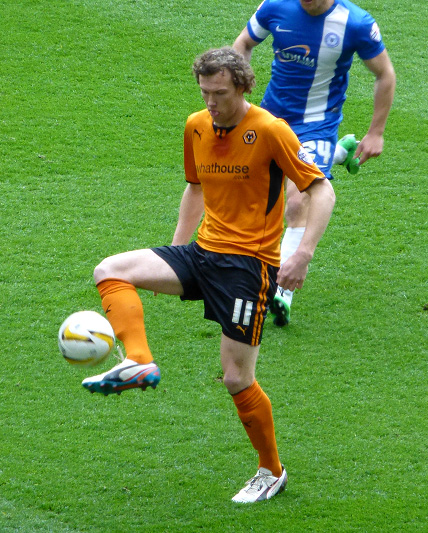
McDonald playing for Wolverhampton Wanderers in 2014

On 14 August 2013 McDonald moved to fellow League One club Wolverhampton Wanderers, signing a three-year contract for an undisclosed fee (reported to be £750,000). After making his Wolves debut as a substitute in a 2–1 win at Bristol City on 17 August 2013, he scored his first goal two weeks later in a 3–1 win at Port Vale on 31 August.

McDonald became a regular starting player in the Wolves' side that set a new League One points record (103) as it won the division. At the conclusion of the campaign, he won both the Fans' as well as the Players' Player of the Season Awards, having been already also named in the PFA's League One Team of the Year.

At Championship level, he remained a regular member of Wolves' team, featuring in every league game as the club missed out on the play-off on goal difference. Over the summer he attracted interest from fellow Championship club Fulham, who reportedly bid for the midfielder after failing to agree a new contract at Wolves. He admitted to being aware of the interest and said "it is obviously a bit unsettling not knowing where you are going to be". He subsequently agreed a new three-year deal at Wolves that was due to run until summer 2018.

=== Fulham ===
Despite his new contract agreement with Wolves, McDonald eventually moved to Fulham after the 2015–16 season, signing for the London club on 22 July 2016 for an undisclosed fee in a three-year deal (with the option of an additional year). He scored his first goal for Fulham in a 2–2 draw with Cardiff City on 20 August 2016.

In March 2021, McDonald stated that he will receive a kidney transplant in April 2021 which may end his playing career prematurely. McDonald was unable to play for Fulham during the 2020–21 season due to his illness. He said in July 2021 that he had undergone the operation, having received a kidney from his brother Fraser. In August 2021 McDonald revealed that his kidney disease was IgA nephropathy, a chronic disease characterised by the gradual build-up of an antibody in the kidneys' filtration system that causes a gradual deterioration in kidney performance.

=== Dundee United and afterwards ===
After leaving Fulham at the end of the 2020–21 season upon the expiry of his contract, McDonald went six months without a club. During January 2022, he trained with Dundee United, and signed a short-term contract with them on 1 February 2022. Released by United at the end of the season, he went on trial with Derby County, playing for them in a pre-season friendly but missing out on a contract due to injury. He subsequently trained with Fulham's under-21 team and planned to do some coaching.

=== Exeter City ===
On 31 January 2023, McDonald signed for League One club Exeter City on a short-term contract until the end of the season having been training with the club for a short period. McDonald scored his first goal for Exeter on 25 February, in a 2–0 win against Cambridge United. It was also his first goal since he received a kidney transplant in 2021, and came eight days after his daughter was born.

=== Bradford City ===
On 20 June 2023, McDonald signed for Bradford City on a free transfer on a two-year deal. He became player-caretaker manager on 4 October 2023. On 30 August 2024, McDonald's contract with Bradford City was terminated by mutual consent.

=== Return to Exeter City ===
On 13 November 2024, McDonald re-signed with Exeter City on a short-term contract until January, having been training with the League One side after his departure from Bradford City. On 16 January 2025, McDonald signed a contract extension until the end of the season.

== International career ==
McDonald received his first call up to the senior Scotland team when Gordon Strachan called him up for a match against Germany in August 2014. On 29 September 2015 he was called up again for games against Poland and Gibraltar. McDonald was selected again in March 2018, this time by Alex McLeish, for friendlies with Costa Rica and Hungary. He made his international debut in a 1–0 home defeat against Costa Rica.

== Career statistics ==
As of match played 4 October 2025

Appearances and goals by club, season and competition
Club	Season	League			National cup (Note: Includes Scottish Cup, FA Cup)		League cup (Note: Includes Scottish League Cup, EFL Cup)		Other		Total	
Club	Season	Division	Apps	Goals	Apps	Goals	Apps	Goals	Apps	Goals	Apps	Goals
Dundee	2005–06	Scottish First Division	26	3	6	0	0	0	1 (Note: Appearance in Scottish Challenge Cup)	0	33	3
Dundee	2006–07	Scottish First Division	30	2	1	0	1	0	1	0	33	2
Dundee	2007–08	Scottish First Division	34	9	2	1	3	1	0	0	39	11
Dundee	Total		90	14	9	1	4	1	2	0	105	16
Burnley	2008–09	Championship	25	1	2	0	5	2	1 (Note: Appearance(s) in Championship play-offs)	0	33	3
Burnley	2009–10	Premier League	26	1	2	0	2	0	—		30	1
Burnley	2010–11	Championship	0	0	0	0	1	1	—		1	1
Burnley	Total		51	2	4	0	8	3	1	0	64	5
Scunthorpe United (loan)	2010–11	Championship	5	1	—		—		—		5	1
Notts County (loan)	2010–11	EFL League One	11	0	—		—		—		11	0
Sheffield United	2011–12	EFL League One	31	3	3	0	0	0	4 (Note: Two appearances in Football League Trophy, two in EFL League One play-offs)	0	38	3
Sheffield United	2012–13	EFL League One	45	1	3	0	1	0	2 (Note: Appearances in League One play-offs)	0	51	1
Sheffield United	2013–14	EFL League One	1	1	—		1	0	—		2	1
Sheffield United	Total		77	5	6	0	2	0	6	0	91	5
Wolverhampton Wanderers	2013–14	EFL League One	41	5	1	0	—		2 (Note: Appearances in Football League Trophy)	0	44	5
Wolverhampton Wanderers	2014–15	Championship	46	0	1	0	0	0	—		47	0
Wolverhampton Wanderers	2015–16	Championship	33	3	1	0	1	0	—		35	3
Wolverhampton Wanderers	Total		120	8	3	0	1	0	2	0	126	8
Fulham	2016–17	Championship	43	3	3	0	0	0	2	0	48	3
Fulham	2017–18	Championship	42	3	1	0	0	0	3	0	46	3
Fulham	2018–19	Premier League	15	0	0	0	1	0	—		16	0
Fulham	2019–20	Championship	16	0	1	0	1	0	0	0	18	0
Fulham	2020–21	Premier League	0	0	0	0	0	0	—		0	0
Fulham	Total		116	6	5	0	2	0	5	0	128	6
Dundee United	2021–22	Scottish Premiership	9	0	2	0	—		—		11	0
Exeter City	2022–23	EFL League One	11	3	0	0	0	0	0	0	11	3
Bradford City	2023-24	EFL League Two	19	0	0	0	0	0	4 (Note: Appearance(s) in EFL Trophy)	0	23	0
Exeter City	2024–25	EFL League One	11	0	2	0	0	0	1	0	14	0
Exeter City	2025–26	EFL League One	3	1	0	0	1	0	0	0	4	1
Exeter City	Total		14	1	2	0	1	0	1	0	18	1
Career total			522	40	31	1	18	4	21	0	600	45

== Honours ==
Burnley

- Football League Championship play-offs: 2009

Wolverhampton Wanderers

- Football League One: 2013–14

Fulham

- EFL Championship play-offs: 2018, 2020

Individual

- PFA Team of the Year: 2013–14 League One
- Football League One Team of the Season: 2013–14
