= 2017–18 Raith Rovers F.C. season =

Raith Rovers
2017–18 season
- Chairman: Alan Young
- Manager: Barry Smith
- Stadium: Stark's Park
- League 1: 2nd
- Challenge Cup: Quarter-final
- League Cup: Group stage
- Scottish Cup: Third round
- Top goalscorer: League: Lewis Vaughan (15); All: Lewis Vaughan (23)
- Highest home attendance: 4,496 vs. Alloa Athletic, 28 April 2018
- Lowest home attendance: 971 vs. Brora Rangers, 15 August 2017
- Average home league attendance: 1,886
Home colours	Away colours

The 2017–18 season was Raith Rovers' first season in the third tier of Scottish football since being relegated from the Scottish Championship via the play-offs at the end of the 2016–17 season. Raith Rovers also competed in the Challenge Cup, League Cup and the Scottish Cup.

== Summary ==
=== Management ===
Raith were led by manager Barry Smith for the 2017–18 season for his 1st season at the club.

== Results and fixtures ==
Win Draw Loss Postponed

=== Pre-season ===
5 July 2017 Pre-Season Friendly	Edinburgh City	1 – 1	Raith Rovers	Ainslie Park
19:45	Allan 54'	Raith Report	Court 90'	Attendance: 321; Referee: Craig Charleston

8 July 2017 Pre-Season Friendly	Clyde	1 – 2	Raith Rovers	Broadwood Stadium
12:30	Goodwillie 53' (pen.)	Raith Report	Buchanan 15'; Ferguson 67' (o.g.)	Attendance: 324; Referee: David Lowe

10 July 2017 Pre-Season Friendly	Raith Rovers	3 – 0	Dunfermline Athletic	Stark's Park
19:45	Buchanan 23'; Vaughan 31'; Matthews 88'	Raith Report		Attendance: 1,460; Referee: John Beaton

=== Scottish League One ===
5 August 2017 League One	Alloa Athletic	1 – 1	Raith Rovers	Indodrill Stadium
15:00	Cawley 16'	Raith Report	Vaughan 90'	Attendance: 1,114; Referee: Barry Cook

12 August 2017 League One	Raith Rovers	3 – 0	Stranraer	Stark's Park
15:00	Vaughan 43', 64'; Spence 61'	Raith Report		Attendance: 1,625; Referee: Mike Roncone

19 August 2017 League One	Raith Rovers	3 – 1	Forfar Athletic	Stark's Park
15:00	Vaughan 31'; Buchanan 85'; Spence 88'	Raith Report	Millar 18'; Bain (red card) 39'	Attendance: 1,589; Referee: Alan Newlands

26 August 2017 League One	East Fife	0 – 5	Raith Rovers	Bayview Stadium
15:00		Raith Report	Barr 5'; Vaughan 20', 80'; Spence 39'; Buchanan 69'	Attendance: 1,850; Referee: Craig Napier

9 September 2017 League One	Raith Rovers	2 – 1	Ayr United	Stark's Park
15:00	Vaughan 50'; Thomson 59'	Raith Report	Shankland 45'; Higgins (yellow card) 88' (red card)	Attendance: 2,286; Referee: Alan Muir

16 September 2017 League One	Queen's Park	0 – 5	Raith Rovers	Hampden Park
15:00		Raith Report	Buchanan 3'; Vaughan 7'; Zanatta 56'; Barr 80'; Thomson 90'	Attendance: 873; Referee: John McKendrick

23 September 2017 League One	Raith Rovers	2 – 0	Airdrieonians	Stark's Park
15:00	Thomson 74'; Zanatta 89'	Raith Report		Attendance: 1,726; Referee: Mat Northcroft

30 September 2017 League One	Albion Rovers	2 – 1	Raith Rovers	Exsel Group Stadium
15:00	Trouten 38'; Shields 83'	Raith Report	Spence 87'	Attendance: 616; Referee: David Lowe

14 October 2017 League One	Raith Rovers	2 – 0	Arbroath	Stark's Park
15:00	Vaughan 32'; Thomson 37'	Raith Report		Attendance: 1,827; Referee: Barry Cook

28 October 2017 League One	Forfar Athletic	1 – 1	Raith Rovers	Station Park
15:00	Millar 73' (pen.)	Raith Report	Herron 59'; Davidson (red card) 72'	Attendance: 865; Referee: Graham Beaton

4 November 2017 League One	Raith Rovers	1 – 0	East Fife	Stark's Park
15:00	Vaughan 29'	Raith Report		Attendance: 2,656; Referee: Stephen Finnie

14 November 2017 League One	Ayr United	3 – 0	Raith Rovers	Somerset Park
19:45	Shankland 16'; Crawford 22'; Moore 90'	Raith Report		Attendance: 2,040; Referee: Barry Cook

25 November 2017 League One	Raith Rovers	2 – 0	Queen's Park	Stark's Park
15:00	Zanatta 64'; Spence 66'	Raith Report		Attendance: 1,260; Referee: Mike Roncone

2 December 2017 League One	Raith Rovers	2 – 1	Alloa Athletic	Stark's Park
15:00	Spence 55'; Buchanan 68'	Raith Report	Cawley 88'	Attendance: 1,400; Referee: Colin Steven

10 December 2017 League One	Airdrieonians	2 – 2	Raith Rovers	Excelsior Stadium
16:10	Hastie 23'; Russell 38'	Raith Report	Spence 22'; Court 90'	Attendance: 450; Referee: Don Robertson

23 December 2017 League One	Arbroath	1 – 2	Raith Rovers	Gayfield Park
15:00	Matthews 55' (o.g.)	Raith Report	Spence 19'; Buchanan 32'	Attendance: 1,035; Referee: Euan Anderson

30 December 2017 League One	Raith Rovers	3 – 0	Stranraer	Stark's Park
15:00	Spence 13'; Buchanan 27'; Vaughan 69'	Raith Report		Attendance: 1,432; Referee: Craig Charleston

2 January 2018 League One	East Fife	2 – 3	Raith Rovers	Bayview Stadium
15:00	Wilkie 20'; Linton 56'	Raith Report	Robertson 8'; Buchanan 25'; Zanatta 78'	Attendance: 1,795; Referee: Gavin Ross

6 January 2018 League One	Raith Rovers	2 – 1	Forfar Athletic	Stark's Park
15:00	Spence 13'; Trialist 26' (o.g.)	Raith Report	Peters 21'	Attendance: 1,575; Referee: Greg Aitken

13 January 2018 League One	Raith Rovers	1 – 1	Ayr United	Stark's Park
15:00	Spence 47'	Raith Report	Shankland 34'	Attendance: 3,064; Referee: Barry Cook

20 January 2018 League One	Stranraer	1 – 0	Raith Rovers	Stair Park
15:00	Beith 9'	Raith Report		Attendance: 449; Referee: Scott Millar

27 January 2018 League One	Alloa Athletic	0 – 0	Raith Rovers	Indodrill Stadium
15:00		Raith Report		Attendance: 904; Referee: Alan Muir

3 February 2018 League One	Queen's Park	1 – 3	Raith Rovers	Hampden Park
15:00	Keena 41'; Fotheringham (yellow card) 90' (red card)	Raith Report	Murray 15'; Furtado 18'; Buchanan 30'	Attendance: 777; Referee: Graham Beaton

6 February 2018 League One	Raith Rovers	3 – 1	Albion Rovers	Stark's Park
19:45	Herron 7', 63'; Thomson 76'	Raith Report	Hopkins 54'	Attendance: 1,294; Referee: Alan Newlands

10 February 2018 League One	Raith Rovers	2 – 1	Airdrieonians	Stark's Park
15:00	Furtado 64'; Vaughan 77'	Raith Report	Carrick 44'	Attendance: 1,685; Referee: Craig Charleston

17 February 2018 League One	Albion Rovers	2 – 2	Raith Rovers	Exsel Group Stadium
15:00	Trouten 11', 90' (pen.)	Raith Report	Murray 40'; Marr 82' (o.g.)	Attendance: 519; Referee: Gavin Duncan

24 February 2018 League One	Raith Rovers	2 – 2	Arbroath	Stark's Park
15:00	Thomson 43'; Furtado 74'	Raith Report	Wallace 64' (pen.); McIntosh 90'	Attendance: 1,707; Referee: Mat Northcroft

10 March 2018 League One	Ayr United	3 – 0	Raith Rovers	Somerset Park
15:00	Shankland 34'; Adams 43'; Moffat 53'	Raith Report		Attendance: 2,126; Referee: Gavin Ross

13 March 2018 League One	Forfar Athletic	2 – 1	Raith Rovers	Station Park
19:45	Aitken 68', 76'	Raith Report	Vaughan 78'	Attendance: 509; Referee: Mike Roncone

24 March 2018 League One	Airdrieonians	1 – 2	Raith Rovers	Excelsior Stadium
15:00	Stewart 46'; Watt (yellow card) 90' (red card)	Raith Report	Vaughan 8'; Thomson 20'	Attendance: 915; Referee: Gavin Duncan

27 March 2018 League One	Raith Rovers	2 – 0	East Fife	Stark's Park
19:45	Barr 39'; Davidson 85'	Raith Report		Attendance: 1,485; Referee: Barry Cook

31 March 2018 League One	Raith Rovers	2 – 0	Albion Rovers	Stark's Park
15:00	Barr 86'; Zanatta 89'}	Raith Report		Attendance: 1,456; Referee: Graham Beaton

7 April 2018 League One	Arbroath	1 – 1	Raith Rovers	Gayfield Park
15:00	McIntosh 74'	Raith Report	Buchanan 39' (pen.)	Attendance: 1,110; Referee: Stephen Finnie

14 April 2018 League One	Raith Rovers	2 – 0	Queen's Park	Stark's Park
15:00	Barr 10'; Zanatta 39'	Raith Report		Attendance: 1,391; Referee: Alan Newlands

21 April 2018 League One	Stranraer	0 – 3	Raith Rovers	Stair Park
15:00		Raith Report	Murray 5'; Buchanan 44'; Vaughan 78'	Attendance: 524; Referee: Kevin Graham

28 April 2018 League One	Raith Rovers	0 – 0	Alloa Athletic	Stark's Park
15:00		Raith Report		Attendance: 4,496; Referee: Gavin Duncan

=== Scottish Championship play-offs ===
2 May 2018 Play-Off Semi-Final Leg 1	Alloa Athletic	2 – 0	Raith Rovers	Indodrill Stadium
19:45	Stewart 23'; Flannigan 58'	Raith Report	Davidson (yellow card) 82' (red card)	Attendance: 1,133; Referee: Don Robertson

5 May 2018 Play-Off Semi-Final Leg 2	Raith Rovers	1 – 2 (1 – 4 agg.)	Alloa Athletic	Stark's Park
15:00	Murray 53'	Raith Report	Kirkpatrick 40'; Stewart 81'	Attendance: 1,831; Referee: Stephen Finnie

=== Scottish Challenge Cup ===
15 August 2017 Round 1	Raith Rovers	3 – 0	Brora Rangers	Stark's Park
19:45	Callachan 15'; Vaughan 65'; Osei 83'	Raith Report		Attendance: 971; Referee: Steven Reid

2 September 2017 Round 2	Raith Rovers	4 – 0	Ross County U20	Stark's Park
15:00	Vaughan 7', 21'; Barr 10'; Buchanan 27'	Raith Report		Attendance: 1,035; Referee: Gavin Ross

7 October 2017 Round 3	St Mirren	1 – 3	Raith Rovers	Paisley 2021 Stadium
15:00	Reilly 63'	Raith Report	Vaughan 64'; Spence 73'; Barr 81'	Attendance: 1,970; Referee: Euan Anderson

11 November 2017 Quarter-Final	Dumbarton	2 – 0	Raith Rovers	Dumbarton Football Stadium
15:00	McLaughlin 20'; Roy 49'	Raith Report	Spence (red card) 58'	Attendance: 888; Referee: Gavin Duncan

=== Scottish League Cup ===
==== Table ====
Pos	Team	Pld	W	PW	PL	L	GF	GA	GD	Pts	Qualification	DUN	DND	RAI	COW	BUC
1	Dundee United (Q)	4	3	1	0	0	10	2	+8	11	Qualification for the Second Round	—	—	2–0	4–1	—
2	Dundee (Q)	4	3	0	1	0	8	2	+6	10	Qualification for the Second Round	1–1p	—	—	—	2–0
3	Raith Rovers	4	2	0	0	2	9	5	+4	6		—	1–2	—	2–0	—
4	Cowdenbeath	4	1	0	0	3	5	11	−6	3		—	0–3	—	—	4–2
5	Buckie Thistle	4	0	0	0	4	3	15	−12	0		0–3	—	1–6	—	—

Rules for classification: 1) goal difference, 2) goals scored, 3) away goals scored, 4) matches won, 5) away matches won, 6) drawing of lots.
(Q) Qualified to the phase indicated

==== Matches ====
15 July 2017 Group C	Dundee United	2 – 0	Raith Rovers	Tannadice Park
15:00	McMullan 59'; Keatings 72' (pen.)	Raith Report		Attendance: 3,753; Referee: Steven McLean

18 July 2017 Group C	Raith Rovers	1 – 2	Dundee	Stark's Park
19:45	Vaughan 90'	Raith Report	Moussa 83'; Hendry 90'	Attendance: 2,962; Referee: Stephen Finnie

25 July 2017 Group C	Buckie Thistle	1 – 6	Raith Rovers	Victoria Park
20:00	McLeod 27'	Raith Report	Vaughan 14' (pen.), 45'; Spence 40'; Buchanan 65', 69'; Matthews 86'	Attendance: 620; Referee: Ryan Milne

29 July 2017 Group C	Raith Rovers	2 – 0	Cowdenbeath	Stark's Park
15:00	Vaughan 9'; Buchanan 32'	Raith Report		Attendance: 1,480; Referee: Kevin Graham

=== Scottish Cup ===
18 November 2017 Round 3	Peterhead	3 – 0	Raith Rovers	Balmoor Stadium
15:00	Brown 55'; McAllister 57', 85'	Raith Report		Attendance: 671; Referee: Mat Northcroft

=== Fife Cup ===
12 April 2018 Semi-final	Cowdenbeath	2 – 0	Raith Rovers	Central Park
19:45	Muirhead 37'; Marks 90+3'	Raith Report

== Player statistics ==
=== Squad ===
Last updated 5 May 2018

No.	Pos	Nat	Player	Total		League 1		League Cup		Challenge Cup		Scottish Cup	
No.	Pos	Nat	Player	Apps	Goals	Apps	Goals	Apps	Goals	Apps	Goals	Apps	Goals
	GK	(Australia) AUS	Rory Brian	1	0	1+0	0	0+0	0	0+0	0	0+0	0
	GK	(Australia) AUS	Aaron Lennox	19	0	14+0	0	4+0	0	1+0	0	0+0	0
	GK	(Scotland) SCO	Graeme Smith	28	0	23+1	0	0+0	0	3+0	0	1+0	0
	DF	(Scotland) SCO	Kyle Benedictus	21	0	15+0	0	4+0	0	1+1	0	0+0	0
	DF	(Scotland) SCO	Iain Davidson	36	1	29+1	1	3+0	0	3+0	0	0+0	0
	DF	(Scotland) SCO	Kevin McHattie	14	0	13+0	0	0+0	0	1+0	0	0+0	0
	DF	(Scotland) SCO	David McKay	22	0	13+4	0	1+1	0	1+1	0	1+0	0
	DF	(Scotland) SCO	Euan Murray	45	3	35+1	3	4+0	0	4+0	0	1+0	0
	DF	(Scotland) SCO	Jason Thomson	47	7	38+0	7	4+0	0	4+0	0	1+0	0
	DF	(Scotland) SCO	Jamie Watson	7	0	4+0	0	0+0	0	2+0	0	1+0	0
	MF	(Scotland) SCO	Bobby Barr	39	7	27+7	5	1+1	0	3+0	2	0+0	0
	MF	(Scotland) SCO	James Berry	9	0	0+4	0	0+1	0	3+1	0	0+0	0
	MF	(Scotland) SCO	Ross Callachan	9	1	4+0	0	4+0	0	1+0	1	0+0	0
	MF	(France) FRA	Willis Furtado	18	3	12+6	3	0+0	0	0+0	0	0+0	0
	MF	(Scotland) SCO	Regan Hendry	13	0	10+3	0	0+0	0	0+0	0	0+0	0
	MF	(Scotland) SCO	John Herron	22	3	14+5	3	0+0	0	2+0	0	1+0	0
	MF	(Scotland) SCO	Ross Matthews	44	1	26+9	0	2+2	1	4+0	0	1+0	0
	MF	(Scotland) SCO	Scott Robertson	39	1	30+2	1	4+0	0	1+1	0	1+0	0
	MF	(Canada) CAN	Dario Zanatta	26	6	17+9	6	0+0	0	0+0	0	0+0	0
	FW	(Scotland) SCO	Liam Buchanan	41	14	31+3	10	4+0	3	1+1	1	1+0	0
	FW	(Scotland) SCO	Jonny Court	21	1	1+14	1	0+2	0	0+3	0	1+0	0
	FW	(Ghana) GHA	Yaw Osei	13	1	0+5	0	1+3	0	1+2	1	0+1	0
	FW	(Scotland) SCO	Jack Smith	1	0	0+1	0	0+0	0	0+0	0	0+0	0
	FW	(Scotland) SCO	Greig Spence	41	13	20+12	11	4+0	1	4+0	1	1+0	0
	FW	(Scotland) SCO	Lewis Vaughan	45	23	37+0	15	4+0	4	4+0	4	0+0	0

- Squad numbers are not compulsory in Scottish League One.

=== Disciplinary record ===
Includes all competitive matches.

Last updated May 2018

Nation	Position	Name	League 1		League Cup		Challenge Cup		Scottish Cup		Total	
Nation	Position	Name	Booked	Sent off (straight red)	Booked	Sent off (straight red)	Booked	Sent off (straight red)	Booked	Sent off (straight red)	Booked	Sent off (straight red)
(Scotland)	GK	Graeme Smith	0	0	0	0	1	0	0	0	1	0
(Scotland)	DF	Kyle Benedictus	2	0	0	0	1	0	0	0	3	0
(Scotland)	DF	Iain Davidson	14	1	0	0	0	0	0	0	15	2
(Scotland)	DF	Euan Murray	5	0	0	0	0	0	0	0	5	0
(Scotland)	DF	Jason Thomson	2	0	0	0	0	0	0	0	2	0
(Scotland)	DF	Kevin McHattie	3	0	0	0	0	0	0	0	3	0
(Scotland)	DF	Jamie Watson	1	0	0	0	0	0	0	0	1	0
(Scotland)	MF	Bobby Barr	5	0	0	0	1	0	0	0	6	0
(France)	MF	Willis Furtado	2	0	0	0	0	0	0	0	2	0
(Scotland)	MF	Regan Hendry	1	0	0	0	0	0	0	0	1	0
(Scotland)	MF	John Herron	4	0	0	0	0	0	0	0	4	0
(Scotland)	MF	Ross Matthews	5	1	0	0	0	0	0	0	6	0
(Scotland)	MF	Scott Robertson	1	0	0	1	0	0	1	0	3	0
(Canada)	MF	Dario Zanatta	4	0	0	0	0	0	0	0	4	0
(Scotland)	FW	Liam Buchanan	1	0	0	0	0	0	0	0	1	0
(Scotland)	FW	Greig Spence	2	1	0	0	1	0	0	0	3	1
(Scotland)	FW	Lewis Vaughan	7	0	0	0	0	0	0	0	7	0
(Scotland)	FW	Jonny Court	1	1	0	0	0	0	1	0	3	0

== Team statistics ==
=== League table ===
Pos	Team	Pld	W	D	L	GF	GA	GD	Pts	Promotion, qualification or relegation
1	Ayr United (C, P)	36	24	4	8	92	42	+50	76	Promotion to the Championship
2	Raith Rovers	36	22	9	5	68	32	+36	75	Qualification for the Championship play-offs
3	Alloa Athletic (O, P)	36	17	9	10	56	43	+13	60	Qualification for the Championship play-offs
4	Arbroath	36	17	8	11	70	51	+19	59	Qualification for the Championship play-offs
5	Stranraer	36	16	5	15	58	66	−8	53	

Source: SPFL
Rules for classification: 1) Points; 2) Goal difference; 3) Number of goals scored
(C) Champions; (O) Play-off winners; (P) Promoted

=== Division summary ===
Round	1	2	3	4	5	6	7	8	9	10	11	12	13	14	15	16	17	18	19	20	21	22	23	24	25	26	27	28	29	30	31	32	33	34	35	36
Ground	A	H	H	A	H	A	H	A	H	A	H	A	H	H	A	A	H	A	H	H	A	A	A	H	H	A	H	A	A	A	H	H	A	H	A	H
Result	D	W	W	W	W	W	W	L	W	D	W	L	W	W	D	W	W	W	W	D	L	D	W	W	W	D	D	L	L	W	W	W	D	W	W	D
Position	6	2	2	1	1	1	1	1	1	1	1	2	2	2	2	2	2	2	2	2	1	1	2	1	1	1	1	1	2	2	2	2	2	2	1	2

Updated to match(es) played on 28 April 2018. Source:
A = Away; H = Home; W = Win; D = Draw; L = Loss; P = Postponed

=== Management statistics ===
Last updated on 5 May 2018

Name	From	To	P	W	D	L	Win% (Note: Win% is the percentage of matches won rounded to two decimal places.)
Barry Smith	5 August 2017	Present	47	27	9	11	57.45
