= Jonathan Court =

Scottish footballer

Personal information
- Date of birth: 30 March 1996 (age 30)
- Position: Striker

Team information
- Current team: Musselburgh Athletic

Youth career
- Raith Rovers

Senior career*
Years	Team	Apps	(Gls)
2014–2018	Raith Rovers	19	(2)
2014	→ Newtongrange Star (loan)		
2014–2015	→ Bonnyrigg Rose Athletic (loan)	20	(1)
2015	→ East Stirlingshire (loan)	13	(1)
2016–2017	→ Montrose (loan)	11	(1)
2018–2019	East Fife	25	(1)
2019–2020	Edinburgh City	21	(2)
2020	Linlithgow Rose		
2024–	Musselburgh Athletic		
- * Club domestic league appearances and goals as of 00:00, 3 November 2020 (UTC)

Jonathan Court (born 30 March 1996) is a Scottish professional footballer who plays as a striker for Musselburgh Athletic.

== Early and personal life ==
Court attended Stewart's Melville College in Edinburgh, where he played rugby rather than football.

== Career ==
Court began his senior career with Raith Rovers in 2014, spending loan spells at Newtongrange Star, Bonnyrigg Rose Athletic, East Stirlingshire and Montrose.

He scored the 5000th goal in the SPFL era for East Stirlingshire against Elgin City at Ochilview in October 2015.

He was released by Raith in May 2018, and signed for East Fife in June 2018.

Court played for Edinburgh City during the 2019–20 season and later signed with East of Scotland team Linlithgow Rose on 25 August 2020.

Rose announced that Court left the club on 2 November 2020.

Court was part of the Musselburgh Athletic squad that won the East of Scotland League Cup in 2024–25.

== Career statistics ==
As of 8 May 2019

Appearances and goals by club, season and competition
Club	Season	League			Scottish Cup		League Cup		Other		Total	
Club	Season	Division	Apps	Goals	Apps	Goals	Apps	Goals	Apps	Goals	Apps	Goals
Raith Rovers	2014–15	Championship	0	0	0	0	0	0	0	0	0	0
Raith Rovers	2015–16	Championship	1	0	0	0	0	0	0	0	1	0
Raith Rovers	2016–17	Championship	4	1	0	0	0	0	2 (Note: Appearance(s) in the Scottish Challenge Cup.)	0	6	1
Raith Rovers	2017–18	League One	14	1	1	0	2	0	4	0	21	1
Raith Rovers	Total		19	2	1	0	2	0	6	0	28	2
Bonnyrigg Rose Athletic (loan)	2014–15	East Superleague	20	1	0	0	0	0	8	2	28	3
East Stirling (loan)	2015–16	League Two	13	1	0	0	0	0	0	0	13	1
Montrose (loan)	2016–17	League Two	11	1	2	1	0	0	0	0	13	2
East Fife	2018–19	League One	25	1	2	0	3	0	3	1	33	2
Career total			88	6	5	1	5	0	17	2	115	10

== Honours ==
Musselburgh

- East of Scotland League Cup: 2024–25
