= Yaw Osei =

Swaziland-born Ghanaian footballer (born 1998)

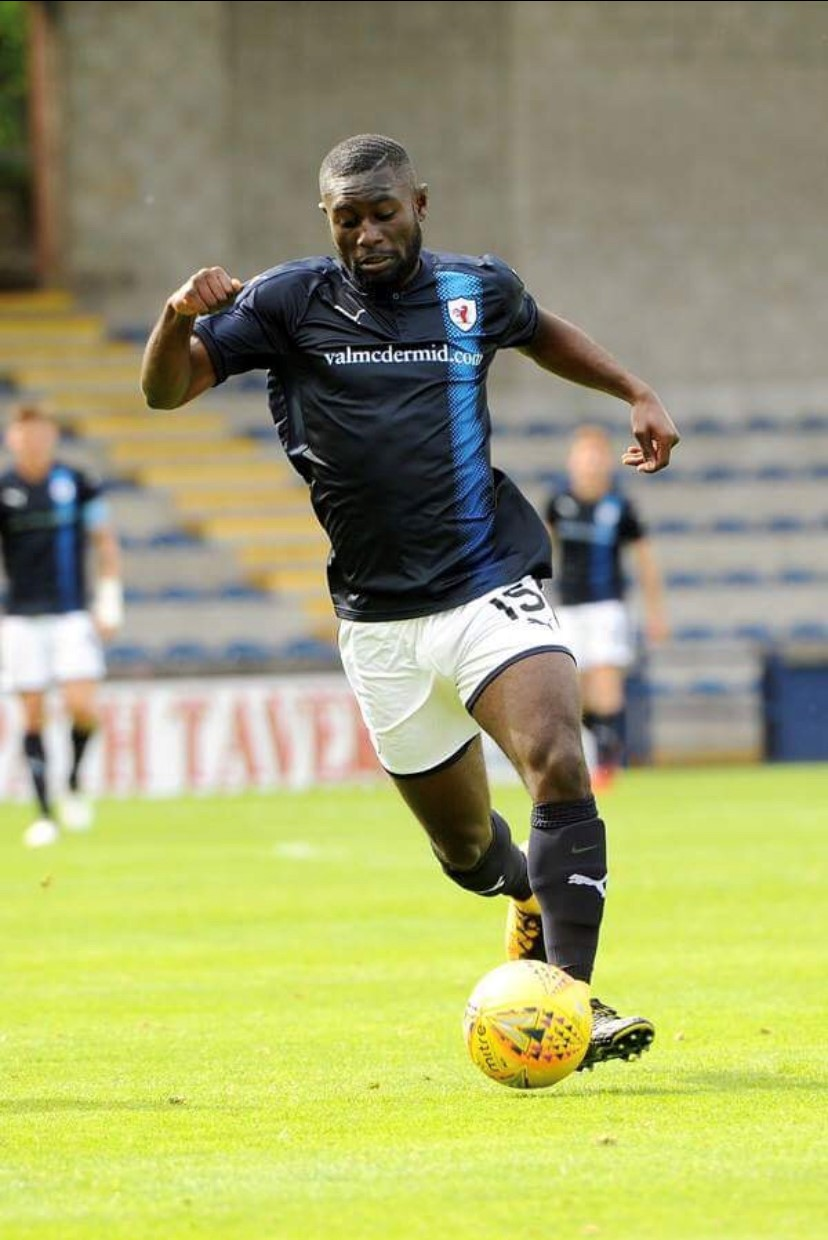
- Yaw Osei playing for Raith Rovers.

Personal information
- Full name: Yaw Osei Opoku-Berchie
- Date of birth: 19 February 1998 (age 28)
- Place of birth: Swaziland
- Position: Forward

Youth career
- Reading
- Chalfont St Peter

Senior career*
Years	Team	Apps	(Gls)
2016–2018	Raith Rovers	6	(0)
2019–2020	Berwick Rangers	0	(0)
- * Club domestic league appearances and goals as of 13:30, 24 July 2019 (UTC)

Yaw Osei (born 19 February 1998) is a Swaziland-born Ghanaian footballer who plays as a forward.

== Career ==
Osei played for a local team, Langley Zebras where he was seen by Reading F.C. Over the years he was in and out of the academy without earning a contract before joining JMA Reading FC based at John Madejski Academy for 2 years. Osei also signed for a Non league youth side Windsor F.C making 11 appearances as a substitute and scoring 12 goals in the season (2013/2014). Osei spent his youth career with Windsor F.C and Chalfont St Peter. Osei shone as he was the youngest 1st team player at Chalfont and with his great physical attributes he stood out mostly playing on the wing. On 14 July 2016, after having scored and impressed Raith Rovers manager Gary Locke in a pre-season friendly against Arbroath, Osei signed a professional contract with Raith Rovers. A day later, he made his professional debut as a substitute in a Scottish League Cup win over Cove Rangers, a match where he also saw his first yellow card for the club. Osei made his league debut on 11 March 2017 in a 4–0 defeat to Dumbarton. Osei was released by Raith following the end of the 2017–18 season.

== Career statistics ==
As of match played 4 November 2017

Appearances and goals by club, season and competition
Club	Season	League			Scottish Cup		League Cup		Other		Total	
Club	Season	Division	Apps	Goals	Apps	Goals	Apps	Goals	Apps	Goals	Apps	Goals
Raith Rovers	2016–17	Championship	1	0	0	0	2	0	0	0	3	0
Raith Rovers	2017–18	League One	5	0	0	0	4	0	2 (Note: Appearances in the Scottish Challenge Cup)	1	11	1
Career total			6	0	0	0	6	0	2	1	14	1
