= Aaron Lennox =

Australian soccer player

Personal information
- Full name: Aaron Keith Lennox
- Date of birth: 19 February 1993 (age 33)
- Place of birth: Hurstville, Australia
- Height: 1.91 m (6 ft 3 in)
- Position: Goalkeeper

Youth career
- 2009–2011: AIS

Senior career*
Years	Team	Apps	(Gls)
2011–2015	Queens Park Rangers	0	(0)
2012	→ Maidenhead United (loan)	3	(0)
2014	→ Concord Rangers (loan)	3	(0)
2015	Hayes & Yeading United	0	(0)
2016–2017	Aberdeen	1	(0)
2016–2017	→ Raith Rovers (loan)	2	(0)
2017–2018	Raith Rovers	16	(0)
2018–2019	Partick Thistle	0	(0)
2019	→ Cowdenbeath (loan)	8	(0)
2019–2023	Montrose	54	(0)

International career
2009	Australia U17	1	(0)
2012	Australia U20	3	(0)
2014–2016	Australia U23	7	(0)
- * Club domestic league appearances and goals

Aaron Keith Lennox (born 19 February 1993) is an Australian former professional footballer who played as a goalkeeper. Lennox played for Queens Park Rangers, Maidenhead United, Concord Rangers, Hayes & Yeading United, Aberdeen, Raith Rovers, Cowdenbeath, Partick Thistle and Montrose. He has represented Australia numerous times at youth level.

== Club career ==
=== Queens Park Rangers ===
In 2011, Lennox joined Queens Park Rangers.

On 30 January 2013, Lennox signed a two-year extension with Queens Park Rangers, but failed to make a single appearance.

In May 2015, at the end of his contract, Lennox was not offered an extension and was released by Queens Park Rangers.

==== Maidenhead United (loan) ====
On 24 February 2012, Lennox joined Maidenhead United on short-term loan, and a day later made his debut, playing a full game against Boreham Wood, conceding 3 goals. He then went on to keep a clean sheet in the next game against top of the table Woking in a 2–0 victory. In the first half of the game he saved a penalty from midfielder Jack King.

==== Concord Rangers (loan) ====
On 3 October 2014, Lennox joined Conference South club Concord Rangers on a 28-day loan. After 3 appearances for Concord Rangers, Lennox broke his finger during training and returned early to Queens Park Rangers.

=== Hayes & Yeading United ===
On 19 September 2015, Lennox joined Hayes & Yeading United, but terminated his contract a week later after not making an appearance.

=== Aberdeen ===
On 25 January 2016, Lennox signed for Scottish side Aberdeen until the end of the season. He made his professional debut against Ross County in the final game of the 2015–16 Scottish Premiership. In May 2016, he signed a new one-year contract with Aberdeen. Following his loan to Raith Rovers, Lennox was released by Aberdeen on 31 May 2017.

=== Raith Rovers ===
After extending his contract with Aberdeen, Lennox joined Scottish Championship side Raith Rovers on a season long loan in June 2016. He made his debut for Raith Rovers against St Mirren in the second league match of the season. He then kept a clean sheet in his second match for Raith Rovers making a string of saves despite tearing his hamstring in the first half of the match. He was forced to play through the injury as there was not a fit goalkeeper on the bench. Five months later Lennox sustained significant injuries to his face and hand during a training match against Dundee United. As a result Lennox returned to Aberdeen in March 2017.

On 30 June 2017, it was announced that Lennox had re-joined Raith Rovers on a permanent transfer. He played the first league match of the 2017–18 season, making a crucial save to allow Lewis Vaughan to score the equalising goal of a 1–1 draw with Alloa Athletic. Lennox was released by Raith at the end of the 2017–18 season.

=== Partick Thistle ===
Lennox signed a one-year contract with Scottish Championship club Partick Thistle in June 2018.

Lennox made his debut for Partick Thistle against Stenhousemuir FC in July 2018. Tearing his cruiciate in a contact after punching clear at a corner. He then played 20 minutes until having to be substituted at half time.

==== Cowdenbeath (loan) ====
Lennox was loaned to Cowdenbeath in January 2019 until the end of the season.

In his first game for Cowdenbeath, Lennox was named in the SPFL Team of the Week for a solid performance making multiple saves at crucial stages only to concede to a late penalty.

=== Montrose ===
In July 2019, Lennox joined Montrose of Scottish League One on a one-year deal.

In June 2023 Lennox made an announcement of his step back from football to become a father leaving Montrose a year before his contract expired.

== International career ==
In December 2013 Lennox was named in Australia's U-23 squad for the AFC U-22 Championship. He played in a goalless draw with Jordan U23s during Australia's showing at the 2016 AFC U-23 Championship.

== Career statistics ==
As of match played 9 July 2023

Appearances and goals by club, season and competition
Club	Season	League			National cup		League cup		Other		Total	
Club	Season	Division	Apps	Goals	Apps	Goals	Apps	Goals	Apps	Goals	Apps	Goals
Queens Park Rangers	2013–14	Championship	0	0	0	0	0	0	0	0	0	0
Maidenhead United (loan)	2011–12	Conference South	3	0	0	0	—		0	0	3	0
Concord Rangers (loan)	2014–15	Conference South	3	0	0	0	—		0	0	3	0
Hayes & Yeading United	2015–16	Conference South	0	0	0	0	—		0	0	0	0
Aberdeen	2015–16	Scottish Premiership	1	0	0	0	0	0	0	0	1	0
Raith Rovers (loan)	2016–17	Scottish Championship	2	0	0	0	0	0	0	0	2	0
Raith Rovers	2017–18	Scottish League One	14	0	0	0	4	0	1 (Note: Appearance(s) in the Scottish Challenge Cup)	0	19	0
Raith Rovers	Raith Rovers total		16	0	0	0	4	0	1	0	21	0
Partick Thistle	2018–19	Scottish Championship	0	0	0	0	1	0	0	0	1	0
Cowdenbeath (loan)	2018–19	Scottish League Two	8	0	0	0	0	0	0	0	8	0
Montrose	2019–20	Scottish League One	18	0	0	0	3	0	2	0	23	0
Montrose	2020–21	Scottish League One	10	0	1	0	1	0	—		12	0
Montrose	2021–22	Scottish League One	19	0	2	0	2	0	2	0	25	0
Montrose	2022–23	Scottish League One	7	0	1	0	4	0	1	0	13	0
Montrose	Total		54	0	4	0	10	0	5	0	73	0
Career total			85	0	4	0	15	0	6	0	110	0

== See also ==
- List of foreign Scottish Premiership players
