= Scott Roberts (footballer) =

Scottish footballer

Personal information
- Date of birth: 15 March 1996 (age 30)
- Place of birth: Irvine, Scotland
- Position: Midfielder

Team information
- Current team: Broomhill
- Number: 11

Youth career
- 2012–2015: Rangers

Senior career*
Years	Team	Apps	(Gls)
2015–2017	Rangers	0	(0)
2016	→ Raith Rovers (loan)	12	(1)
2017	Raith Rovers	5	(0)
2017–2019	Annan Athletic	37	(5)
2019	Elgin City	14	(0)
2019–2020	Albion Rovers	25	(3)
2020–2021	Stirling Albion	18	(1)
2021–2023	Albion Rovers	28	(2)
2023–	Broomhill	13	(1)
- * Club domestic league appearances and goals as of 18:08, 21 January 2024 (UTC)

Scott Roberts (born 5 June 1996) is a Scottish footballer who plays as a midfielder for Broomhill.

== Career ==
Roberts, who started his career with Rangers, joined Scottish Championship side Raith Rovers on a short-term loan deal on 19 July 2016, and subsequently signed permanently for the club on 11 January 2017.

After being released by Raith at the end of the 2016–17 season, Roberts signed for Scottish League Two club Annan Athletic on 16 September 2017.

Roberts moved to Elgin City in January 2019.

On 5 July 2019, Roberts signed for Albion Rovers.

== Career statistics ==
As of match played 29 April 2021

Appearances and goals by club, season and competition
Club	Season	League			Scottish Cup		League Cup		Other		Total	
Club	Season	Division	Apps	Goals	Apps	Goals	Apps	Goals	Apps	Goals	Apps	Goals
Rangers	2016–17	Scottish Premiership	0	0	0	0	0	0	0	0	0	0
Raith Rovers (loan)	2016–17	Scottish Championship	12	1	0	0	1	0	0	0	13	1
Raith Rovers	2016–17	Scottish Championship	5	0	0	0	0	0	0	0	5	0
Annan Athletic	2017–18	Scottish League Two	21	3	1	0	0	0	0	0	22	3
Annan Athletic	2018–19	Scottish League Two	16	2	3	0	4	1	2 (Note: Appearances in the Scottish Challenge Cup)	0	25	3
Annan Athletic	Total		37	5	4	0	4	1	2	0	47	6
Elgin City	2018–19	Scottish League Two	14	0	0	0	0	0	0	0	14	0
Albion Rovers	2019–20	Scottish League Two	25	3	2	1	4	0	1	0	32	4
Stirling Albion	2020–21	Scottish League Two	18	1	1	0	3	0	0	0	22	1
Career total			111	10	7	1	12	1	3	0	133	12
