= Bobby Barr (footballer) =

Scottish footballer (born 1988)

Personal information
- Full name: Robert Barr
- Date of birth: 23 June 1988 (age 38)
- Place of birth: Glasgow, Scotland
- Height: 1.70 m (5 ft 7 in)
- Position: Left midfielder

Team information
- Current team: Ashfield

Youth career
- St Johnstone

Senior career*
Years	Team	Apps	(Gls)
2007–2008	St Johnstone	0	(0)
2008	→ Albion Rovers (loan)	10	(3)
2008–2010	Albion Rovers	43	(12)
2009–2010	→ Brechin City (loan)	4	(0)
2010–2013	Livingston	96	(10)
2012–2013	→ East Fife (loan)	30	(6)
2013–2015	Brechin City	68	(10)
2015–2016	Greenock Morton	34	(1)
2016–2018	Raith Rovers	62	(6)
2018–2019	Dumbarton	36	(6)
2019–2020	East Stirlingshire	19	(5)
2020–2021	Forfar Athletic	16	(1)
2021	Brechin City	13	(2)
2021-2022	Cowdenbeath	8	(0)
2022-	Ashfield		
- * Club domestic league appearances and goals as of 23:05, 31 October 2021 (UTC)

Robert Barr (born 23 June 1988) is a Scottish professional footballer who plays as a midfielder for Ashfield.

== Career ==
Born in Glasgow, Barr first played for St Johnstone, but failed to make it into the first team. After being released by St Johnstone he was given a chance by Paul Martin at Albion Rovers, before signing for Livingston manager Gary Bollan in January 2010. Livingston won the Scottish Third Division.

Before he was released by Livingston, Barr was sent to East Fife on loan for a period of three months and scored on his debut at home to Ayr United. In June 2013, he signed for Brechin City, and after two years at the club moved to Greenock Morton on a one-year deal. He scored his first goal for the club in a 4-2 win at Livingston on 5 September 2015.

Barr signed a pre-contract agreement on a two-year deal with league rivals Raith Rovers, with his signing being confirmed at the end of May 2016. Following the end of his contract, Barr was released by Raith at the end of the 2017–18 season. He signed for Dumbarton on 4 June 2018 and scored his first goal for the club in a 4-2 Scottish League Cup defeat to Kilmarnock a month later. After being an ever-present as the Sons finished sixth in Scottish League One Barr turned down a new deal to join Lowland League side East Stirlingshire.

Barr signed with Forfar Athletic in January 2020. He then moved to Cowdenbeath in July 2021.

Following the Blue Brazil's relegation from Scottish League Two, Barr left the club. He joined West of Scotland Football League side Ashfield following a short trial.

== Career statistics ==
As of 08:28, 1 May 2020 (UTC)

Appearances and goals by club, season and competition
Club	Season	League			Scottish Cup		League Cup		Other		Total	
Club	Season	Division	Apps	Goals	Apps	Goals	Apps	Goals	Apps	Goals	Apps	Goals
Albion Rovers (loan)	2007–08	Third Division	10	3	0	0	0	0	0	0	10	3
Albion Rovers	2008–09	Third Division	32	11	2	1	1	0	1 (Note: Appearances in the Scottish Challenge Cup)	1	36	13
Albion Rovers	2009–10	Third Division	11	1	0	0	2	1	2	1	15	3
Albion Rovers	Total		43	12	2	1	3	1	3	2	51	16
Brechin City (loan)	2009–10	Second Division	4	0	0	0	0	0	0	0	4	0
Livingston	2009–10	Third Division	20	0	0	0	0	0	0	0	20	0
Livingston	2010–11	Second Division	35	6	0	0	0	0	0	0	35	6
Livingston	2011–12	First Division	36	4	1	0	2	0	2	2	41	6
Livingston	2012–13	First Division	5	0	0	0	2	1	0	0	7	1
Livingston	Total		96	10	1	0	4	1	2	2	103	13
East Fife (loan)	2012–13	Second Division	30	6	0	0	—		4 (Note: Appearances in the Second Division play-offs)	0	34	6
Brechin City	2013–14	League One	34	5	1	0	1	1	1	0	37	6
Brechin City	2014–15	League One	34	5	4	1	1	0	4 (Note: Two appearances in the Scottish Challenge Cup and two in the Championship play-offs)	0	43	6
Brechin City	Total		68	10	5	1	2	1	5	0	80	12
Greenock Morton	2015–16	Championship	34	1	3	0	4	0	1	0	42	1
Raith Rovers	2016–17	Championship	29	1	2	1	4	0	2 (Note: One appearance in the Scottish Challenge Cup and one in the Championship play-offs)	0	37	2
Raith Rovers	2017–18	League One	33	5	0	0	2	0	3	2	39	7
Raith Rovers	Total		62	6	2	1	6	0	7	2	76	9
Dumbarton	2018–19	League One	36	6	1	0	4	1	2	0	43	7
Forfar Athletic	2019–20	League One	6	0	0	0	0	0	0	0	6	0
Career total			367	54	14	3	23	4	24	6	449	67

== Honours ==
Livingston

- Third Division: 2009–10
- Second Division: 2010–11

Individual

- 2008–09 Scottish Third Division PFA Player of the Year
