= Milan Páleník =

Czech footballer

Personal information
- Date of birth: 18 May 1977 (age 49)
- Place of birth: Czechoslovakia
- Height: 1.90 m (6 ft 3 in)
- Position: Defender

Senior career*
Years	Team	Apps	(Gls)
1998–2001	Baník Ostrava	27	(2)
2001–2002	Mladá Boleslav	31	(4)
2002–2003	Dukla Hranice	53	(1)
2003–2004	Siad Most	33	(2)
2004–2007	Dukla Banská Bystrica	61	(4)
2007–2008	Dundee	29	(4)
2008	ASIL Lysi	10	(0)
2009	Mutěnice		
2009–2010	DAC Dunajská Streda	1	(0)
- * Club domestic league appearances and goals as of 16 July 2007

Milan Páleník (born 18 May 1977 in the Czech Republic) is a retired Czech footballer.

== Position ==
He had played as a central defender and with previous experience as a striker or attacking midfielder.
