= Pavol Penksa =

Retired Slovak footballer

Personal information
- Full name: Pavol Penksa
- Date of birth: 7 November 1985 (age 41)
- Place of birth: Spišská Nová Ves, Czechoslovakia
- Height: 1.93 m (6 ft 4 in)
- Position: Goalkeeper

Senior career*
Years	Team	Apps	(Gls)
- Spišská Nová Ves
- Horn
2004–2005	Goral Stará Ľubovňa		
2006	Fotbal Kunovice		
- Tatran Prachatice
2007–2008	Slovan Duslo Šaľa		
2008–2011	Ružomberok	26	(0)
2011–2012	Anagennisi Deryneia	6	(0)
2012–2013	Zalaegerszeg	2	(0)
2013–2014	Ružomberok	1	(0)
2014	→ DAC Dunajská Streda (loan)	14	(0)
2014–2015	DAC Dunajská Streda	8	(0)
2015	→ ŽP Šport Podbrezová (loan)	8	(0)
2015–2016	Iskra Borčice	9	(0)
2016	Frýdek-Místek	3	(0)
2016	Tatran Prešov	1	(0)
2017	Raith Rovers	10	(0)
2018–2020	iClinic Sereď	21	(0)

Managerial career
- 2021–: Zemplín Michalovce (goalkeeping coach)
- * Club domestic league appearances and goals as of 30 December 2019

Pavol Penksa (born 7 November 1985) is a retired Slovak footballer who played as a goalkeeper.

Penksa signed a short-term deal with Scottish club Raith Rovers in March 2017, after all three of the club's goalkeepers were unfit to participate in matches.
