= Tomáš Pešír =

Czech footballer

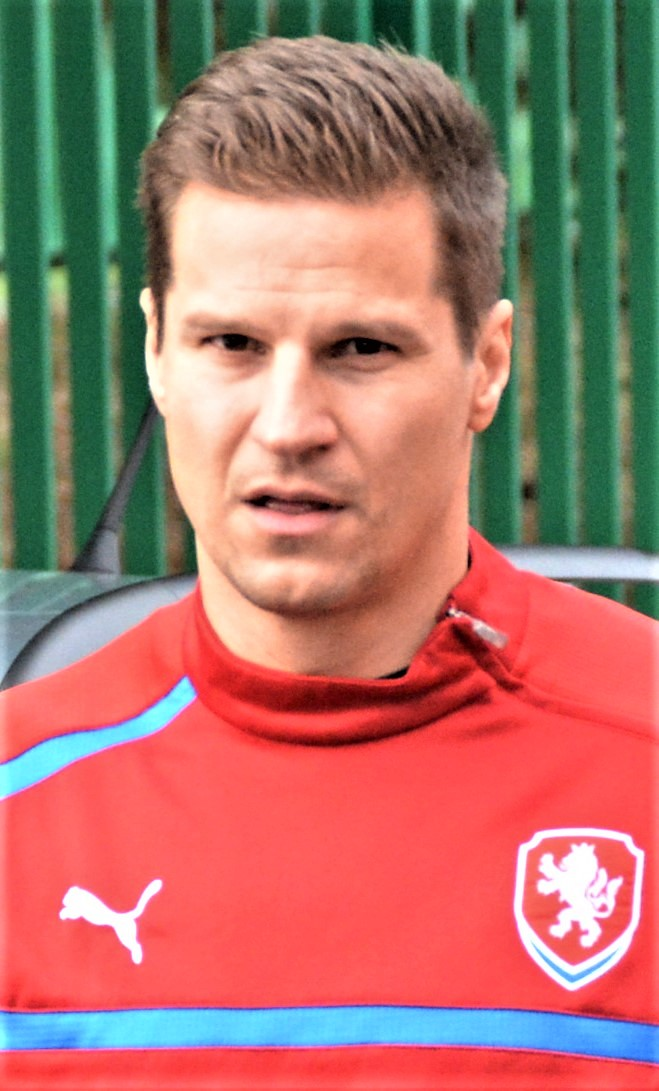

Personal information
- Date of birth: 30 May 1981 (age 45)
- Place of birth: Prague, Czechoslovakia
- Height: 1.85 m (6 ft 1 in)
- Position: Striker

Team information
- Current team: Ujezd Praha

Youth career
- 1987–1991: SK Horní Měcholupy
- 1991–2000: Slavia Prague

Senior career*
Years	Team	Apps	(Gls)
2000–2001	Slavia Prague	0	(0)
2000–2001	→ Mladá Boleslav (loan)	19	(6)
2001–2005	Chmel Blšany	79	(8)
2005	Kayserispor	12	(5)
2005–2006	Slavia Prague	15	(1)
2006	Chmel Blšany	10	(0)
2006–2007	SIAD Most	24	(1)
2007–2008	→ Livingston (loan)	20	(7)
2008	SIAD Most	11	(1)
2008	Jagiellonia Białystok	8	(0)
2009	Ružomberok	11	(1)
2009	Néa Salamís	6	(0)
2010	Zenit Čáslav	9	(0)
2010–2013	Górnik Łęczna	81	(12)
2013–2014	Sokol Cizova		
2014–2017	Přední Kopanina		
2017–2020	Ujezd Praha		
2020	SK Hostivar		
2020–2021	Ujezd Praha		
2021–2022	Cechie Dubec		
2022–	Ujezd Praha		

International career
2002–2003	Czech Republic U21	10	(2)
- * Club domestic league appearances and goals as of 30 June 2024

Tomáš Pešír (born 30 May 1981) is a Czech footballer who plays as a striker for Ujezd Praha. He has had a journeyman career, having played for 15 different clubs in his 24-year playing career.

== Career ==
=== Club ===
Pešír signed for Scottish First Division side Livingston in July 2007. He made 20 league appearances for Livingston in the 2007–08 season, scoring 7 goals. He played his last game for the club in January 2008, marking the occasion by scoring twice in a 6–1 win against Greenock Morton. In September 2008 he signed with Jagiellonia Białystok.

After leaving Livingston, he returned to Czech Republic and had spells playing for several clubs before signing for Ujezd Praha in 2022.

=== National team ===
He played for his country in the 2001 FIFA World Youth Championship. He also represented the Czech Republic at under-21 level, making ten appearances and scoring two goals.
