= Jan Žemlík =

Czech footballer

Personal information
- Date of birth: 9 October 1977 (age 49)
- Place of birth: Příbram, Czechoslovakia
- Height: 1.98 m (6 ft 6 in)
- Position: Striker

Youth career
- 1983–1991: Nový Jičín
- 1991: Sokol Žilina
- 1991–1994: Nový Jičín
- 1994–1995: Baník Ostrava

Senior career*
Years	Team	Apps	(Gls)
1995–1996	Dukla Hranice		
1996–1998	Nový Jičín		
1998	Žilina	10	(3)
1999	Frýdek-Místek	7	(0)
1999	Koba Senec	15	(3)
2000	Baník Prievidza	5	(0)
2000	LeRK Prostějov	10	(3)
2000–2001	Włókniarz Kietrz		
2001	Nový Jičín		
2001–2002	LeRK Prostějov	5	(3)
2002–2003	Chmel Blšany	30	(12)
2003–2004	Marila Příbram	34	(6)
2004–2007	Tescoma Zlín	30	(5)
2007	Dundee	18	(1)
2008–2009	Saigon United		
2009–2011	Nový Jičín		
Total		158	(36)
- * Club domestic league appearances and goals

Jan Žemlík (born 9 October 1977) is a Czech retired footballer.
