= Bryan Deasley (footballer) =

Scottish footballer (born 1988)

Personal information
- Date of birth: 29 June 1988 (age 38)
- Place of birth: Dundee, Scotland
- Position: Winger

Team information
- Current team: Lochee United

Senior career*
Years	Team	Apps	(Gls)
2005–2010	Dundee	31	(7)
2008	→ Arbroath (loan)	4	(1)
2009–2010	→ Forfar Athletic (loan)	12	(4)
2010–2011	Forfar Athletic	20	(3)
2011–2013	Peterhead	22	(4)
2012–2013	→ Carnoustie Panmure (loan)		
2013	Lochee United		
2013–2014	Forfar Athletic	3	(0)
2013	→ Montrose (loan)	35	(10)
2014–2015	Montrose	16	(3)
2015–	Lochee United		
- * Club domestic league appearances and goals as of 18 March 2014

Bryan Deasley (born 29 June 1988) is a Scottish professional footballer who plays for Lochee United.

== Career ==
Born in Dundee, and a product of the Dundee youth system, Deasley made his debut on 26 December 2005 against Airdrie United in a First Division match. He won 2 young player of the month awards and then won the young player of the year award. He scored a memorable goal against Dundee derby rivals Dundee United.

Towards the end of the 2007–08 season, Deasley was loaned out to Arbroath. He was then loaned to Second Division Cowdenbeath and a year loan at Third Division side Forfar Athletic. On 4 May 2010, he was informed along with three other players that he was no longer wanted by Dundee and was free to look for another club.

Deasley then signed for Forfar Athletic.

In June 2011, Deasley left the Loons to join relegated Peterhead.

Deasley went on loan to junior side Carnoustie Panmure in December 2012, before finally leaving Peterhead to sign for fellow junior side Lochee United in February 2013.

He resigned for Forfar Athletic in the summer of 2013.

On 31 August Deasley join Montrose on loan until January 2014.

On 26 June 2015, Deasley join Lochee United.

== Career statistics ==
As of 6 December 2012

Appearances and goals by club, season and competition
Club	Season	League			FA Cup		League Cup		Other^{[A]}		Total	
Club	Season	Division	Apps	Goals	Apps	Goals	Apps	Goals	Apps	Goals	Apps	Goals
Dundee	2005–06	Scottish First Division	13	1	6	2	0	0	0	0	19	3
Dundee	2006–07	Scottish First Division	13	2	1	1	1	0	1	0	16	3
Dundee	2007–08	Scottish First Division	1	0	0	0	0	0	1	0	2	0
Dundee	2008–09	Scottish First Division	12	1	0	0	1	0	0	0	13	1
Dundee	2009–10	Scottish First Division	0	0	0	0	0	0	0	0	0	0
Arbroath (loan)	2007–08	Scottish Third Division	7	1	0	0	0	0	0	0	7	1
Forfar Athletic (loan)	2009–10	Scottish Third Division	22	2	1	0	2	1	3	1	28	4
Dundee Total			39	4	7	3	2	0	2	0	50	7
Forfar Athletic	2010–11	Scottish Second Division	34	3	0	0	1	0	2	0	37	3
Total			34	3	0	0	1	0	2	0	37	3
Peterhead	2011–12	Scottish Third Division	22	4	0	0	0	0	0	0	22	4
Peterhead	2012–13	Scottish Third Division	11	0	0	0	1	0	1	0	13	0
Total			35	4	0	0	1	0	1	0	35	4
Career totals			137	14	8	3	6	1	8	1	157	19

A. The "Other" column constitutes appearances and goals (including substitutes) in the Scottish Challenge Cup, Scottish First Division Play-offs and Scottish Second Division Play-offs
