= Bob Davidson (footballer) =

Scottish footballer (born 1986)

Personal information
- Full name: Robert Davidson
- Date of birth: 25 March 1986 (age 40)
- Place of birth: Rutherglen, Scotland
- Position: Striker

Youth career
- 1999–2006: Rangers

Senior career*
| Years | Team | Apps | (Gls) |
| 2004–2007 | Rangers | 2 | (0) |
| 2006 | → Boston United (loan) | 9 | (0) |
| 2007–2009 | Dundee | 54 | (11) |
| 2009 | Clyde (trial) | 2 | (0) |
| 2015–2017 | Cambuslang Rangers | | |
- * Club domestic league appearances and goals as of 21:56, 11 May 2009 (UTC)

Robert Davidson (born 25 March 1986 in Rutherglen) is a Scottish footballer.

Davidson started his career at Rangers, and after progressing through the Ibrox side's youth ranks alongside Ross McCormack, he made his debut against Dunfermline on 16 May 2004 as part of an experimental team fielded by manager Alex McLeish at the end of the season. He made one other appearance, against Inverness Caledonian Thistle in a 1–1 draw in season 2004–05.

He was loaned to Boston United in England at the start of the 2006–07 season, returning to Rangers in January. However, at the behest of new manager Walter Smith he was allowed to leave on a free transfer, joining Dundee in January 2007. Davidson failed to have his contract renewed when it expired in 2009.

Davidson made two appearances as a trialist for Clyde in the Second Division during the 2009/10 season. He then moved into junior football with Lanark United. In 2015 he signed for Cambuslang Rangers.
