= Scott Robertson (footballer, born 1985) =

Scottish footballer and coach

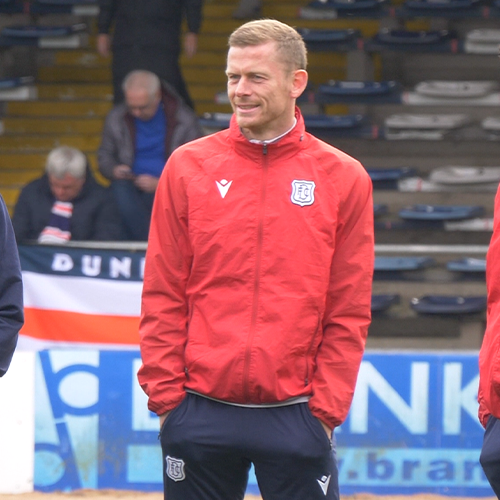
- Robertson in 2024

Personal information
- Full name: Scott Robertson
- Date of birth: 7 April 1985 (age 41)
- Place of birth: Dundee, Scotland
- Position: Midfielder

Team information
- Current team: Dundee (coach)

Senior career*
| Years | Team | Apps | (Gls) |
| 2003–2008 | Dundee | 102 | (8) |
| 2004 | → Peterhead (loan) | 26 | (4) |
| 2008–2012 | Dundee United | 107 | (9) |
| 2012–2013 | Blackpool | 1 | (0) |
| 2013–2015 | Hibernian | 68 | (8) |
| 2015 | Botoșani | 1 | (0) |
| 2015–2018 | Raith Rovers | 30 | (1) |
| 2019 | Brechin City | 16 | (0) |
| 2019–2020 | Forfar Athletic | 17 | (0) |
| Total | | 342 | (26) |

International career
| 2008–2010 | Scotland | 2 | (0) |
- * Club domestic league appearances and goals

Scott Robertson (born 7 April 1985) is a Scottish football coach and former player who currently serves as a coach at Dundee. Robertson played as a midfielder for Dundee, Peterhead, Dundee United, Blackpool, Hibernian, Romanian club Botosani, Raith Rovers, Brechin City and Forfar Athletic, and was also formerly the assistant manager of Forfar. He also represented Scotland twice in full international matches.

== Club career ==
=== Dundee ===
Robertson began his career with Dundee and progressed through the ranks of the club’s youth system. He appeared once as an unused substitute bench during the 2003–04 season with the Dens. Robertson made his senior debut while on loan at Peterhead, spending the second part of the 2003–04 season at Balmoor. He made his professional football debut (and for the club), starting the whole game, in a 2–0 win against Stirling Albion on 7 February 2004. Robertson then scored his first goal for Peterhead, in a 1–1 draw against Stranraer on 27 March 2004. This was followed up by scoring two more goals, coming against Albion Rovers and East Stirlingshire. At the end of the 2003–04 season, he made fifteen appearances and scoring three times in all competitions.

At the start of the 2004–05 season, Robertson returned to Peterhead on loan, resulting in him spending all of 2004 with the Scottish Third Division side. He went on to make ten appearances and scoring once for the club before recalled by his parent club in January. Shortly after returning to Dens Park, Robertson made his Dundee debut, coming on as a 70th-minute substitute, in a 2–0 loss against Hibernian on 9 January 2005. However, Dundee were relegated from the Scottish Premier League on the last game of the season following a 1–1 draw against Livingston. At the end of the 2004–05 season, he went on to make nine appearances in all competitions for Dundee.

Ahead of the 2005–06 season, Robertson’s performances attracted interest from Craig Levein at Leicester City, but he was stayed put at Dundee. Robertson then scored his first goal for the club against Airdrieonians in the second round of the Scottish League Cup and went on to win on penalties following a 1–1 draw. Following this, he quickly became a first team regular at Dundee in the First Division throughout the 2005–06 season. On 3 February 2006, Robertson signed a new deal to keep him at the club until 2008. A month later, on 4 March 2006, he scored his second goal of the season, in a 4–2 win against Hamilton Academical. At the end of the 2005–06 season, Robertson went on to make forty–four appearances and scoring two times in all competitions.

In the 2006–07 season, Robertson continued to maintain his starting place in the first team. On 2 January 2007, he scored his first goal of the season, in a 2–0 win against Livingston. A month later, on 3 February 2007, Robertson scored his second goal of the season, in a 3–0 win against Airdrieonians. However, he suffered an injury that saw him out for the rest of the season. At the end of the 2006–07 season, Robertson made thirty–three appearances and scoring two goals in all competitions.

In the opening game of the 2007–08 season, Robertson scored twice on his return from his injury, in a 2–0 win against Livingston. Following this, he continued to maintain his starting place in the first team. On 28 August 2007, Robertson scored his second goal of the season, in a match against Livingston in the second round of the Scottish League Cup and helped Dundee win 6–5 on penalties to advance to the next round. He later scored three more goals by the end of 2007, including another against Livingston. His performance led the club to open talks with Robertson over a new contract. On 12 February 2008, he scored his sixth goal of the season, in a 2–1 win against Motherwell in the fifth round of the Scottish Cup. However, in a match against St Johnstone, on 1 March 2008, Robertson suffered an injury and was substituted in the 52nd minute, as Dundee won 3–2. After the match, he was out for a month. Robertson returned on 12 April 2008 from his injury, coming on as a 75th-minute substitute, scoring the third goal of the game, in a 3–0 win against Stirling Albion. At the end of the 2007–08 season, he made thirty–four appearances and scoring seven goals in all competitions.

=== Dundee United ===
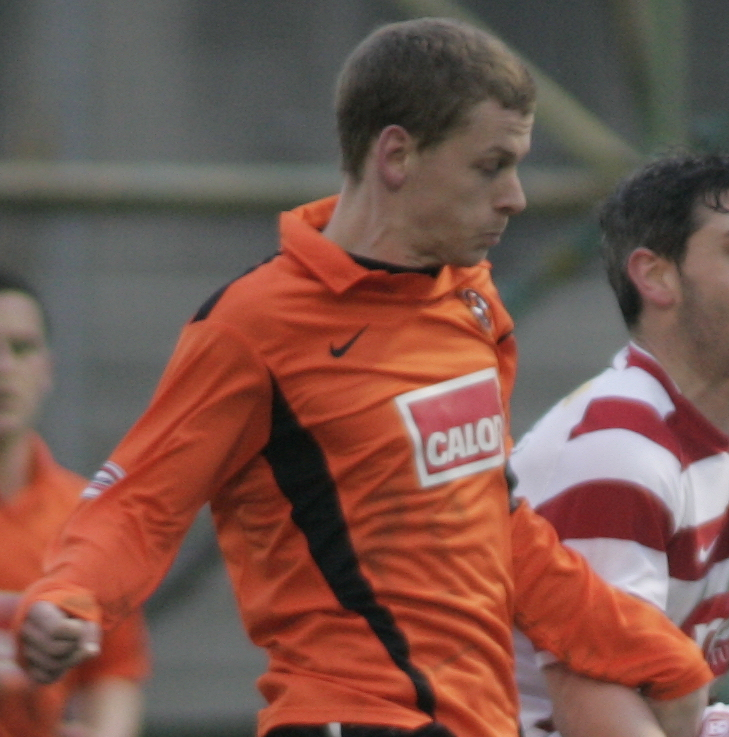
Robertson playing for Dundee United.

After rejecting a new contract in April 2008, and with his contract close to expiry, Robertson signed for Dundee's rivals Dundee United on 3 June 2008, with Craig Levein – then in charge at United – getting the player he had tried to sign three years previously. The 23-year-old joined the Tannadice club under freedom of contract and agreed a three-year deal. Dundee openly criticised Dundee United about the way they pursued Robertson, stating that the Tangerines had been "disrespectful" towards their Dee rivals.

He made his debut for the club, starting the whole game, in a 3–1 loss against Hamilton Academical in the opening game of the season. A month later, on 23 September 2008, Robertson scored his first goal, netting in the League Cup victory over Airdrieonians. Four days later, on 27 September 2008, Robertson scored his first league goal, netting the third in a 3–0 win over Hearts. Since joining Dundee United, he became a first team regular and had played every minute of United's matches that season. Robertson was also praised for his performance that saw him named Man of the Match three times for the Tanagerines. On 28 October 2008, he scored the only goal of the game, in a 1–0 win against Dunfermline Athletic in the quarter–finals of the Scottish League Cup. A week later, on 4 November 2008, Robertson scored his fourth goal for the Tangerines, in a 3–3 draw against Rangers. A month later, on 27 December 2008, he scored the only goal of the game, in a 1–0 win against Falkirk. After the match, Robertson said his aim was to help Dundee United qualify for the Europe next season. In January, however, an osteitis pubis diagnosis during a match against Motherwell ruled him out for the remaining few months of the season. After his recovery, Robertson revealed that he credited surgeon David Lloyd for saving his career and revealed it was the hardest moment of his career. Robertson returned on 7 May 2009 from his injury, coming on as a 71st-minute substitute, in a 1–1 draw against Aberdeen. At the end of the 2008–09 season, he made twenty–six appearances and scoring five goals in all competitions.

At the start of the 2009–10 season, Robertson started in the first four league games of the season. However, in a match against Celtic, on 12 September 2009, he was sent off for a second bookable offence in the 1–1 draw. After serving a one match suspension, Robertson returned to the starting line–up, in a 1–1 draw against St Johnstone on 26 September 2009. However, his return was short–lived when he suffered an injury while on international duty with Scotland. During the same month, his former club, Dundee director, Calum Melville, publicly stated he was planning to bid £500,000 for Robertson in the January transfer window. Dundee United, however, were not impressed and threatened to haul him in front of the SFA over these comments. Craig Levein, the United manager, criticised the Dundee director by suggesting he needs tutored in the workings of football. In response, Dundee manager Jocky Scott was also reluctant to sign Robertson, especially not in the near future. However, he, once again, suffered an injury by straining his abductor muscle and was out for a month. On 5 December 2009, Robertson made his return from his injury, coming on as a 53rd-minute substitute, in a 3–2 win against St Mirren. However, his return was short–lived for the third time in the 2009–10 season when he suffered an Inguinal Hernia, which ruled him out for the remaining few months of the season and described 2009 as his worst year. Expecting to return in the 2010–11 pre–season, he made his return to training after being out for four months. On 18 April 2010, Robertson returned to the first team, coming on as a 81st-minute substitute, in a 3–2 win against Motherwell. in the Scottish Cup final, he came on as a 74th-minute substitute, in a 3–0 win against Ross County, picking up his first winners medal. After the match, Robertson talked about winning the final and said "It's been a long 18 months and while the Cup Final doesn't make up for all the frustration and pain that I went through, it helps quite a bit. And I'm proud to have played a part in this win and somehow got a winner's medal that I never dreamed could have come my way two months ago.". At the end of the 2009–10 season, he made sixteen appearances in all competitions. Following this, Robertson signed a 12-month contract extension, that will expire in 2012.

At the start of the 2010–11 season, Robertson said about his return: "Coming back into the team has been a bit strange because I feel like the new boy. He played in both legs of the UEFA Europa League play–off round against Greek side AEK Athens, as Dundee United loss 2–1 on aggregate and was eliminated from the tournament. Robertson alternated between the substitute bench and the starting line–up at the club. However, in a match against Kilmarnock, on 22 January 2011, he received a red card for a second bookable offence, in a 1–1 draw. After serving a one match suspension, Robertson returned to the starting line–up, in a 3–0 win against Hibernian on 30 January 2011. Following this, he said his aim was to score goals for the Tangerines in the 2010–11 season. Robertson also captained a number of matches for the Tangerines. On 19 March 2011, Robertson set up the only goal of the game for Danny Swanson, in a 1–0 win against Inverness Caledonian Thistle. At the end of the 2010–11 season, he went on to make forty–two appearances in all competitions.

Ahead of the 2011–12 season, Robertson suffered an ankle injury limped out of a pre-season friendly with Forfar Athletic. But he soon recovered in late–July and made his return from his injury, coming on as a 76th-minute substitute, in a 1–0 win against Hearts on 31 July 2011. Since returning from his injury, Robertson continued to alternate between the substitute bench and starting eleven. After missed one match due to a knock, he returned to the starting line–up, in a 3–3 draw against Hibernian on 24 September 2011. In mid-October, Manager Peter Houston began negotiating a new deal with Robertson and many other players. On 19 November 2011, he scored his first goal in three years, in a 1–0 win over Hearts. Two months later, on 7 January 2012, in the fourth round of the Scottish Cup, Robertson scored and provided an assist for Gary Mackay-Steven in a 6–2 win over Airdrie United. A month later, on 21 February 2012, he scored his third goal of the season, in a 4–0 win against Kilmarnock. Two weeks later, on 5 March 2012, Robertson scored his fourth goal of the season, in a 3–0 win against Inverness Caledonian Thistle. Three weeks later, on 31 March 2012, he scored his fifth goal of the season, in a 3–0 win against Dunfermline Athletic. On 21 April 2012, Robertson scored his sixth goal of the season, in a 2–0 win against St Johnstone. On 6 May 2012, he scored the winning goal, in a 1–0 win against champions, Celtic. At the end of the 2011–12 season, Robertson made forty–one appearances and scoring seven times in all competitions.

With his contract the end of the 2011–12 season, Robertson said he hinted about staying at Dundee United. But many clubs in England including Birmingham City, Brentford, Blackpool and Rangers were interested in signing Robertson.

=== Blackpool ===
On 27 July 2012, Robertson signed a two-year contract with an option for a further year with Blackpool. Upon signing for the club, Robertson said he would like to be as successful at Blackpool as Charlie Adam had been in his spell there.

Robertson made his only appearance for Blackpool, starting the match, in a 3–0 loss against Cardiff City on 29 September 2012. However, it didn't go to plan as his first team opportunities where he spent most of his time at the club on the bench or not in the squad and only made one appearance. Upon leaving Blackpool, Robertson says his time there was 'torture' and that the club had signed him without even seeing him play.

=== Hibernian ===
Robertson was released from his contract at Blackpool on 28 January 2013, and signed for Hibernian.

Two days after joining the club, on 30 January 2013, Robertson made his debut for Hibs, starting the whole game, in a 1–0 loss against Ross County. Since joining the club, he quickly became a first team regular, playing in the midfield position. In the Edinburgh derby against Hearts, Robertson played a role into setting up a goal for Ross Caldwell, who scored a winning goal, in a 2–1 win. In a follow–up match against Kilmarnock, he scored his first goal for Hibs on 15 May 2013, in a 3–1 win against Kilmarnock. After the match, Robertson later admitted that he should have scored for Hibs earlier than that, particularly when he missed an easy chance in a Scottish Cup tie against Falkirk. In the 2013 Scottish Cup Final, Robertson was an unused substitute as Hibernian lost 3–0 to Celtic. At the end of the 2012–13 season, he went on to make twelve appearances and scoring once in all competitions.

In the 2013–14 season, Robertson played in both legs on as a substitute in UEFA Europa League qualifying second round to Swedish side Malmö, as Hibernian suffered a 9–0 aggregate, including a 7–0 reverse in the home leg. He then scored the club's first goal of the season, in a 1–1 draw against Dundee United on 17 August 2013. After serving a one match suspension for accumulating five yellow cards. Robertson returned to the starting line–up and set up the equalising goal, in a 2–1 win against St Johnstone on 14 September 2013. Following his return from suspension, he continued to be involved in the first team, especially after Terry Butcher became manager. During a match against Ross County in the fourth round of the Scottish Cup, Robertson suffered a hamstring injury and was substituted in the first minute of the game, as the club won 1–0. But he made a quick recovery. However, his return was short–lived when Robertson, once again, was suspended for accumulating five yellow cards for the second time this season. Having accumulated five yellow cards for the third time this season, he suffered a medial knee ligament damage while playing for Hibernian’s reserve team and was out for two months. On 15 April 2014, Robertson returned to training from his injury after a nine weeks' absence. However, the club’s manager Butcher was unwilling to risk returning him quickly to the team. On 27 April 2014, he made his return from his injury, starting the match, in a 2–1 loss against rivals, Hearts. In the Premiership play–off final against Hamilton Academical, Robertson played in both legs that led to penalty shootout following a 2–2 draw on aggregate and scored in a shootout, as Hibernian loss 4–3 and were relegated to the Scottish Championship. At the end of the 2013–14 season, he went on to make thirty–one appearances and scoring once in all competitions. Robertson later reflected on the 2013–14 season, describing it as a "disaster".

At the start of the 2014–15 season, however, Robertson received a red card for a second bookable offence, in a 2–1 loss against rivals, Hearts on 17 August 2014. After serving a one match suspension, he returned to the starting line–up, playing the whole game, in a 3–2 win against Cowdenbeath on 13 September 2014. Following his return from his injury, Robertson continued to be in the first team regular under the management of Alan Stubbs. Robertson scored his first goal of the season on 4 October 2014, in a 1–1 draw against Raith Rovers. However, in mid–November, he missed one match, due to suffering from a broken hand. But on 22 November 2014, Robertson made his return to the starting line–up, in a 6–3 win against Dumbarton. A month later, on 27 December 2014, he then scored his second goal of the season in a 4–0 win against Rangers. Robertson then scored on 17 January 2015 and 24 January 2015 against Cowdenbeath and Queen of the South respectively. Two weeks later on 13 February 2015, Robertson scored his fifth goal of the season, in a 2–0 win at Rangers. He had to wait until on 22 April 2015 to score his sixth goal of the season, in a 3–1 win over Livingston. Robertson only played in the first leg of the semi–finals of Premiership play-offs against Rangers, as he was unable to help Hibernian to secure promotion from the Scottish Championship after losing 2–1 on aggregate. At the end of the 2014–15 season, Robertson made forty–one appearances and scoring six goals in all competitions for the club.

With his contract at the club expiring at the end of the 2014–15 season, Robertson said he was keen on signing a new contract with Hibernian. However, Robertson left the club at the end of the season under freedom of contract. Following this, He expressed "devastation" to not be at Hibernian for the next season and was keen to stay, citing his family.

=== Botosani ===
Robertson signed for Romanian club Botosani in June 2015, becoming the first Scot to play in the Romanian Liga 1.

He made his debut for the club, coming on as a 64th-minute substitute, in a 1–0 loss against Legia Warsaw in the second qualifying round of the UEFA Europa League. In the return, Robertson was unable to help Botosani overcome the deficit, as the club loss 3–0 and was eliminated from the tournament. However, he made three appearances for Botosani and left the club by mutual consent on 8 September 2015. Robertson later describing the move as a 'nightmare'.

=== Raith Rovers ===
On 3 October 2015, it was announced that Robertson had signed for Raith Rovers.

He made his debut for the club, coming on as a 76th-minute substitute, in a 2–1 win against Greenock Morton on the same day. A month later, on 21 November 2015, Robertson scored his first goal for Raith Rovers, in a 3–3 draw against Dumbarton. Since joining the club, he became a first team regular, playing in the midfield position. However, Robertson suffered an injury that saw him out for a month. On 9 April 2016, he made his return from his injury, starting the whole game, in a 3–1 win against Queen of the South. At the end of the 2015–16 season, Robertson made twenty–one appearances and scoring once in all competitions.

However, Robertson missed almost all the 2016–17 season due to a groin injury. His first appearance of the season was in a promotion/relegation play-off match against Brechin City. The game ended in a 3–3 draw and Robertson missed the decisive kick in a penalty shootout, which meant that Raith were relegated to League One.

At the start of the 2017–18 season, Robertson regained his first team place, playing in either centre–back position and midfield position. On 2 January 2018, he scored his first goal of the season, in a 3–2 win against East Fife. However, Robertson suffered a hamstring injury that saw him out for two matches. But on 6 February 2018, he made his return from his injury against Albion Rovers and set up a goal, in a 3–1 win. However, his return was short–lived when Robertson suffered another injury that saw him out for two matches. But on 24 March 2018 when he made his return from his injury, in a 2–1 win against Airdrieonians. Robertson then played in the Scottish Championship play–offs against Alloa Athletic, as Raith Rovers loss 4–1 on aggregate. At the end of the 2017–18 season, he went on to make thirty–nine appearances and scoring once in all competitions. On 8 June 2018, Robertson announced his retirement from playing as he accepted a coaching position with Dundee United.

=== Brechin City ===
After a change of ownership and management at Dundee United meant that Robertson was allowed to play for another club while coaching with them, leading him to sign for Brechin City on 1 January 2019.

He made his debut for the club, starting the whole game, in a 1–0 loss against Arbroath on 5 January 2019. After missing two matches, Robertson made his return to the starting line–up, in a 1–0 win against Airdrieonians on 16 February 2019. However, he was unable to help Brechin City avoid relegation after drawing 1–1 against Stenhousemuir on the last game of the season. At the end of the 2018–19 season, Robertson made sixteen appearances in all competitions. Following this, he was released by the club.

=== Forfar Athletic ===
Robertson signed with Forfar Athletic during the 2019 close season.

He made his debut for the club, coming on as a 70th-minute substitute, in a 2–0 win against Airdrieonians in the group stage of the Scottish League Cup. Since joining Forfar Athletic, Robertson found himself in and out of the starting line–up. However, the season was curtailed because of the COVID-19 pandemic, with the club finishing ninth place. As a result, Forfar Athletic furloughed players, including Robertson. At the end of the 2019–20 season, he made twenty–three appearances in all competitions. Despite being offered a one-year extension by Forfar in 2020, Robertson decided to prioritise his coaching role with Dundee and declined the offer.

=== International career ===
On 17 November 2008, Robertson was called up to the Scotland squad in the friendly against Argentina. Two days later, on 19 November 2008, he received his first international cap for Scotland in the friendly against Argentina, coming on as a 59th-minute substitute for Barry Ferguson, in a 1–0 loss. After the match, Robertson reflected on his Scotland’s debut, saying: "I didn't expect to play for as long, if at all. All the best and I hope you do well'. I've kept the shirt from tonight. No-one expected me to do brilliantly, and I didn't, but I think I did alright when I had the ball. Just to be involved was great. The lads were great with me. I did not know any of the boys coming into the squad, although I have played against most of them. They made me feel very welcome."

A year later, in October 2009, Robertson was called up to the Scotland squad but he did not play due to injury. In August 2010, Robertson was recalled to the Scotland squad. He made his second (and last) appearance for Scotland, coming on as a 54th-minute substitute for Kevin Thomson, in a 3–0 loss against Sweden on 11 August 2010.

== Coaching career ==
Robertson began coaching at aged 27, due to his preparation of planning when his football career coming to an end. He went on to earn himself a coaching badge for ‘A’ licence.

Shortly after announcing his retirement from professional football, Robertson was appointed under-18s coach at Dundee United in June 2018. Together with Craig Easton, they helped the club’s U18 team win the D&K Lafferty Cup. They also managed Dundee United’s reserve team match in the Scottish Challenge Cup against Alloa Athletic, as they loss 5–4 on penalties. However, on 7 March 2019, both Easton and Robertson were placed on a gardening leave by Dundee United.

Shortly after signing for Forfar Athletic, Robertson took a similar role with Dundee on 20 June 2019.

In June 2021, Robertson was named as the new assistant manager for his former side Forfar Athletic, under former Forfar teammate Gary Irvine. As part of his deal, he would also remain a youth coach with Dundee. Robertson would remain assistant manager of Forfar until the end of the season, where he would leave the role to take a more 'enhanced' position with Dundee.

== Personal life ==
Scott's mother Diane Robertson (née McLaren) was a footballer and Scottish internationalist who played for her country seventeen times during the 1970s.

At the end of 2010–11 season, Robertson married his wife, Vikki. Robertson attended Dundee's Braeview Academy, alongside fellow future footballers Garry Kenneth and Charlie Adam.

== Career statistics ==
As of match played 29 August 2020

Appearances and goals by club, season and competition
| Club | Season | League | | | Scottish Cup | | League Cup | | Europe | | Other (Note: Includes other competitive competitions, including the Scottish Challenge Cup and SPFL play-offs.) | | Total | |
| Club | Season | Division | Apps | Goals | Apps | Goals | Apps | Goals | Apps | Goals | Apps | Goals | Apps | Goals |
|---|---|---|---|---|---|---|---|---|---|---|---|---|---|---|
| Dundee | 2004–05 | Scottish Premier League | 9 | 0 | 1 | 0 | 0 | 0 | 0 | 0 | 0 | 0 | 10 | 0 |
| Dundee | 2005–06 | First Division | 35 | 1 | 6 | 0 | 0 | 0 | 0 | 0 | 3 | 1 | 44 | 2 |
| Dundee | 2006–07 | First Division | 29 | 2 | 2 | 0 | 1 | 0 | 0 | 0 | 1 | 0 | 33 | 2 |
| Dundee | 2007–08 | First Division | 29 | 5 | 2 | 1 | 3 | 0 | 0 | 0 | 0 | 0 | 34 | 6 |
| Dundee | Total | | 102 | 8 | 11 | 1 | 4 | 0 | 0 | 0 | 4 | 1 | 121 | 10 |
| Dundee Utd | 2008–09 | Scottish Premier League | 23 | 3 | 0 | 0 | 3 | 2 | 0 | 0 | 0 | 0 | 26 | 5 |
| Dundee Utd | 2009–10 | Scottish Premier League | 13 | 0 | 1 | 0 | 2 | 0 | 0 | 0 | 0 | 0 | 16 | 0 |
| Dundee Utd | 2010–11 | Scottish Premier League | 34 | 0 | 5 | 0 | 2 | 0 | 1 | 0 | 0 | 0 | 42 | 0 |
| Dundee Utd | 2011–12 | Scottish Premier League | 37 | 6 | 3 | 1 | 1 | 0 | 0 | 0 | 0 | 0 | 41 | 7 |
| Dundee Utd | Total | | 107 | 9 | 9 | 1 | 8 | 2 | 1 | 0 | 0 | 0 | 125 | 12 |
| Blackpool | 2012–13 | Championship | 1 | 0 | 0 | 0 | 0 | 0 | 0 | 0 | 0 | 0 | 1 | 0 |
| Hibernian | 2012–13 | Scottish Premier League | 12 | 1 | 3 | 0 | 0 | 0 | 0 | 0 | 0 | 0 | 15 | 1 |
| Hibernian | 2013–14 | Scottish Premier League | 24 | 1 | 1 | 0 | 2 | 0 | 2 | 0 | 2 | 0 | 31 | 1 |
| Hibernian | 2014–15 | Scottish Championship | 32 | 6 | 4 | 0 | 3 | 0 | 0 | 0 | 2 | 0 | 41 | 6 |
| Hibernian | Total | | 68 | 8 | 8 | 0 | 5 | 0 | 2 | 0 | 4 | 0 | 87 | 8 |
| Botoșani | 2015–16 | Liga I | 1 | 0 | 0 | 0 | 0 | 0 | 0 | 0 | 0 | 0 | 1 | 0 |
| Raith Rovers | 2015–16 | Scottish Championship | 19 | 1 | 2 | 0 | 0 | 0 | 0 | 0 | 0 | 0 | 21 | 1 |
| Raith Rovers | 2016–17 | Scottish Championship | 1 | 0 | 0 | 0 | 1 | 0 | 0 | 0 | 1 | 0 | 3 | 0 |
| Raith Rovers | 2017–18 | Scottish League One | 10 | 0 | 0 | 0 | 4 | 0 | 0 | 0 | 1 | 0 | 15 | 0 |
| Raith Rovers | Total | | 30 | 1 | 2 | 0 | 5 | 0 | 0 | 0 | 2 | 0 | 39 | 1 |
| Brechin City | 2018–19 | Scottish League One | 16 | 0 | 0 | 0 | 0 | 0 | 0 | 0 | 0 | 0 | 16 | 0 |
| Forfar Athletic | 2019–20 | Scottish League One | 17 | 0 | 1 | 0 | 4 | 0 | 0 | 0 | 1 | 0 | 23 | 0 |
| Career Total | | | 342 | 26 | 31 | 2 | 26 | 2 | 3 | 0 | 11 | 1 | 413 | 31 |

== Honours ==
Dundee United

- Scottish Cup : 1

2010
