= 2011–12 Raith Rovers F.C. season =

Raith Rovers
2011–12 season
- Manager: John McGlynn
- Stadium: Stark's Park
- Scottish First Division: 7th
- Challenge Cup: Second round (eliminated by Ayr United)
- League Cup: Second round (eliminated by Airdrie United)
- Scottish Cup: Fourth round (eliminated by Greenock Morton)
- Top goalscorer: League: Brian Graham (11); All: John Baird (13)
- Highest home attendance: 3,629 vs. Dundee, 2 January 2012
- Lowest home attendance: 1,416 vs. Hamilton Academical, 26 November 2011
- Average home league attendance: 1,933
Home colours	Away colours

The 2011–12 season was Raith Rovers's third consecutive season in the Scottish First Division, having been promoted from the Scottish Second Division at the end of the 2008–09 season. Raith Rovers also competed in the Challenge Cup, League Cup and the Scottish Cup.

== Summary ==
Raith Rovers finished seventh in the First Division. They reached the second round of the Challenge Cup, the second round of the League Cup and the fourth round of the Scottish Cup.

== Results and fixtures ==
Win Draw Loss Postponed

=== Pre-season ===
8 July 2011 Friendly	Arbroath	2–1	Raith Rovers	Gayfield Park, Arbroath
19:30	Swankie 57', 68'	Raith Rovers Report	Baird 66'	Attendance: 294; Referee: Stephen Finnie

9 July 2011 Friendly	Montrose	1–0	Raith Rovers	Links Park, Montrose
15:00	Boyle 40'	Raith Rovers Report		Referee: Craig Charleston

12 July 2011 Friendly	Raith Rovers	1–1	Morecambe	Stark's Park, Kirkcaldy
19:30	Baird 80'	Raith Rovers Report	Alessandra 75'	Referee: Kevin Clancy

16 July 2011 Gilvenbank Hotel Football Festival Semi-Final	East Fife	0–0 (7–6 p)	Raith Rovers	Bayview Stadium, Methil
13:00		Raith Rovers Report		Referee: Craig Charleston

17 July 2011 Gilvenbank Hotel Football Festival 3rd Place Play-Off	Southend United	0–0	Raith Rovers	Bayview Stadium, Methil
13:00		Raith Rovers Report		Referee: John Beaton

=== Scottish First Division ===
6 August 2011 First Division	Raith Rovers	1–0	Falkirk	Stark's Park, Kirkcaldy
15:00	Hamill 45'	BBC Sport	Dods (yellow card) 89' (red card)	Attendance: 2,695; Referee: Charlie Richmond

13 August 2011 First Division	Queen of the South	1–3	Raith Rovers	Palmerston Park, Dumfries
15:00	Smith 45' (pen.), (red card) 87'	BBC Sport	Baird 67', 77'; Graham 88'	Attendance: 1,602; Referee: Alan Muir

20 August 2011 First Division	Raith Rovers	1–1	Morton	Stark's Park, Kirkcaldy
15:00	Reynolds 30'	BBC Sport	Di Giacomo 38'	Attendance: 2,109; Referee: Charlie Richmond

27 August 2011 First Division	Ayr United	2–1	Raith Rovers	Somerset Park, Ayr
15:00	Moffat 23'; Robertson 90'	BBC Sport	Callachan (red card) 28'; Hamill 34'	Attendance: 1,570; Referee: Mat Northcroft

10 September 2011 First Division	Raith Rovers	0–1	Dundee	Stark's Park, Kirkcaldy
15:00		BBC Sport	O'Donnell (yellow card) 28' (red card); Riley 86'	Attendance: 2,459; Referee: Crawford Allan

17 September 2011 First Division	Hamilton Academical	2–2	Raith Rovers	New Douglas Park, Hamilton
15:00	Spence 66'; Lyle 73'	BBC Sport	Baird 45'; Hamill 62'	Attendance: 1,982; Referee: Stephen Finnie

24 September 2011 First Division	Raith Rovers	0–1	Ross County	Stark's Park, Kirkcaldy
15:00		BBC Sport	Boyd 82'	Attendance: 1,479; Referee: John McKendrick

1 October 2011 First Division	Livingston	1–1	Raith Rovers	Almondvale Stadium, Livingston
15:00	McNulty 67'	BBC Sport	Hill (red card) 18'; Graham 60'	Attendance: 2,011; Referee: William Collum

15 October 2011 First Division	Raith Rovers	2–0	Partick Thistle	Stark's Park, Kirkcaldy
15:00	Ellis 31'; Baird 56'	BBC Sport		Attendance: 1,769; Referee: Alan Muir

22 October 2011 First Division	Raith Rovers	0–2	Queen of the South	Stark's Park, Kirkcaldy
15:00		BBC Sport	McLaughlin 18'; Brighton 75'	Attendance: 1,523; Referee: Stephen Finnie

29 October 2011 First Division	Falkirk	2–0	Raith Rovers	Falkirk Stadium, Falkirk
15:00	Alston 77'; Dods 82'	BBC Sport		Attendance: 3,628; Referee: Steve Conroy

5 November 2011 First Division	Dundee	1–0	Raith Rovers	Dens Park, Dundee
15:00	Conroy 83'	BBC Sport		Attendance: 4,258; Referee: Calum Murray

12 November 2011 First Division	Raith Rovers	0–1	Ayr United	Stark's Park, Kirkcaldy
15:00		BBC Sport	Graham 10' (o.g.)	Attendance: 2,038; Referee: John Beaton

26 November 2011 First Division	Raith Rovers	3–2	Hamilton Academical	Stark's Park, Kirkcaldy
15:00	Holt 9'; Prychynenko 61'; Smith 79'	BBC Sport	Imrie 16'; McLaughlin 90'	Attendance: 1,416; Referee: Stevie O'Reilly

3 December 2011 First Division	Ross County	4–2	Raith Rovers	Victoria Park, Dingwall
15:00	Quinn 28'; McMenamin 45', 62'; Gardyne 81'	BBC Sport	Walker 12', 36'	Attendance: 2,698; Referee: Craig Charleston

10 December 2011 First Division	Raith Rovers	0–1	Livingston	Stark's Park, Kirkcaldy
15:00		BBC Sport	Barr 56'	Attendance: 1,604; Referee: Crawford Allan

17 December 2011 First Division	Partick Thistle	0–1	Raith Rovers	Firhill Stadium, Glasgow
15:00		BBC Sport	Baird 66'	Attendance: 1,918; Referee: Mike Tumilty

26 December 2011 First Division	Ayr United	1–1	Raith Rovers	Somerset Park, Ayr
15:00	Tiffoney 63'	BBC Sport	Baird 42'	Attendance: 1,407; Referee: John McKendrick

2 January 2012 First Division	Raith Rovers	0–1	Dundee	Stark's Park, Kirkcaldy
15:00		BBC Sport	Hyde 37'	Attendance: 3,629; Referee: David Somers

14 January 2012 First Division	Morton	1–1	Raith Rovers	Cappielow, Greenock
15:00	O'Brien 65'	BBC Sport	Murray 55'	Attendance: 1,739; Referee: Kevin Clancy

21 January 2012 First Division	Raith Rovers	2–2	Falkirk	Stark's Park, Kirkcaldy
15:00	Murray 27'; Baird 33'	BBC Sport	El Alagui 36'; Dods 63'	Attendance: 2,026; Referee: John Beaton

28 January 2012 First Division	Hamilton Academical	P–P	Raith Rovers	New Douglas Park, Hamilton
15:00

11 February 2012 First Division	Raith Rovers	1–1	Ross County	Stark's Park, Kirkcaldy
15:00	Walker 89'	BBC Sport	Craig 53'	Attendance: 1,702; Referee: Calum Murray

18 February 2012 First Division	Livingston	4–0	Raith Rovers	Almondvale Stadium, Livingston
15:00	Jacobs 17'; McNulty 48', 60', 70' (pen.)	BBC Sport	Davidson (red card) 69'	Attendance: 1,929; Referee: Brian Colvin

21 February 2012 First Division	Hamilton Academical	2–1	Raith Rovers	New Douglas Park, Hamilton
19:45	Canning 45'; Mensing 63'	BBC Sport	Graham 59'	Attendance: 1,276; Referee: John McKendrick

25 February 2012 First Division	Raith Rovers	2–1	Partick Thistle	Stark's Park, Kirkcaldy
15:00	Graham 63'; Baird 72'	BBC Sport	Doolan 28'; Paton (red card) 68'	Attendance: 1,535; Referee: Kevin Clancy

3 March 2012 First Division	Raith Rovers	5–0	Morton	Stark's Park, Kirkcaldy
15:00	Graham 36', 46'; Baird 59'; J.Walker 86'; Williamson 90'	BBC Sport		Attendance: 1,480; Referee: George Salmond

10 March 2012 First Division	Queen of the South	1–0	Raith Rovers	Palmerston Park, Dumfries
15:00	Reilly 82'	BBC Sport		Attendance: 1,561; Referee: Brian Winter

17 March 2012 First Division	Raith Rovers	2–2	Ayr United	Stark's Park, Kirkcaldy
15:00	Graham 13'; Casalinuovo 90'	BBC Sport	Roberts 64' (pen.); Malone 79'	Attendance: 1,861; Referee: Crawford Allan

24 March 2012 First Division	Dundee	1–1	Raith Rovers	Dens Park, Dundee
15:00	Finnigan 6'	BBC Sport	Casalinuovo 45'	Attendance: 4,118; Referee: William Collum

31 March 2012 First Division	Ross County	1–1	Raith Rovers	Victoria Park, Dingwall
15:00	Lawson 85'	BBC Sport	Clarke 90' (pen.)	Attendance: 3,379; Referee: Steven McLean

7 April 2012 First Division	Raith Rovers	2–1	Hamilton Academical	Stark's Park, Kirkcaldy
15:00	Casalinuovo 55'; A. Walker 61'	BBC Sport	McLaughlin 23'	Attendance: 1,526; Referee: Craig Charleston

10 April 2012 First Division	Raith Rovers	0–3	Livingston	Stark's Park, Kirkcaldy
19:45		BBC Sport	Boulding 17' (pen.), 45', 55'	Attendance: 1,541; Referee: Iain Brines

14 April 2012 First Division	Partick Thistle	1–1	Raith Rovers	Firhill Stadium, Glasgow
15:00	Welsh 64'	BBC Sport	Paton 74' (o.g.)	Attendance: 1,832; Referee: Calum Murray

21 April 2012 First Division	Falkirk	2–3	Raith Rovers	Falkirk Stadium, Falkirk
15:00	El Alagui 11'; Alston 67'	BBC Sport	Graham 24' (pen.), 45', 69'	Attendance: 3,024; Referee: Bobby Madden

28 April 2012 First Division	Raith Rovers	3–1	Queen of the South	Stark's Park, Kirkcaldy
15:00	Graham 15'; Baird 54'; Clarke 90'	BBC Sport	Carmichael 58'	Attendance: 2,400; Referee: Brian Colvin

5 May 2012 First Division	Greenock Morton	1–3	Raith Rovers	Cappielow, Greenock
15:00	Hawke 77'	BBC Sport	Walker 16'; Clarke 52', 54'	Attendance: 1,813; Referee: Kevin Clancy

=== Scottish Cup ===
7 January 2011 Scottish Cup round 4	Raith Rovers	1–2	Greenock Morton	Stark's Park, Kirkcaldy
15:00	Clarke 39'	BBC Sport	Campbell 67'; MacDonald 76' (pen.)	Attendance: 1,581; Referee: Steven McLean

=== Scottish League Cup ===
30 July 2011 Scottish League Cup round 1	Montrose	1–4	Raith Rovers	Links Park, Montrose
15:00	Winter 20'	BBC Sport	Williamson 31'; Walker 52'; Baird 54'; Thomson 77'	Attendance: 614; Referee: Brian Colvin

23 August 2011 Scottish League Cup round 2	Airdrie United	2–0	Raith Rovers	Excelsior Stadium, Airdrie
19:45	Holmes 27'; Donnelly 41'	BBC Sport		Attendance: 683; Referee: George Salmond

=== Scottish Challenge Cup ===
23 July 2011 Scottish Challenge Cup round 1	Raith Rovers	2–1	Cowdenbeath	Stark's Park, Kirkcaldy
15:00	Baird 51', 77'	BBC Sport	Coult 80'	Attendance: 1,098; Referee: Mike Tumilty

9 August 2011 Scottish Challenge Cup round 2	Ayr United	3–0	Raith Rovers	Cappielow, Greenock
19:45	Paterson 43'; McKernon 76'; Robertson 79'	BBC Sport		Attendance: 227; Referee: Steve Conroy

=== Fife Cup ===
30 August 2011 Fife Cup Semi-Final	Dunfermline Athletic	0–1	Raith Rovers	East End Park, Dunfermline
19:00		Raith Rovers FC	Graham 90'	Attendance: 524; Referee: David McGeachie

6 October 2011 Fife Cup Final	Raith Rovers	3–0	Cowdenbeath	Stark's Park, Kirkcaldy
19:30	Graham 1', 20', 52'	Raith Rovers FC		Attendance: 320; Referee: David McGeachie

== Player statistics ==
=== Captains ===
No.	P	Name	Country	No. games	Notes
	DF	Grant Murray	(Scotland)	41	Club captain

Last updated: 5 May 2012
Source: Competitive match reports.
Competitive matches only
Matches started as captain only
Country: FIFA nationality; No.: Squad number; P: Position; Name: Player name; No. Games: Number of games started as captain.

=== Squad ===
Last updated 5 May 2012

No.	Pos	Nat	Player	Total		Scottish First Division		Scottish Cup		League Cup		Challenge Challenge Cup	
No.	Pos	Nat	Player	Apps	Goals	Apps	Goals	Apps	Goals	Apps	Goals	Apps	Goals
	GK	(Scotland) SCO	David McGurn	39	0	34+0	0	1+0	0	2+0	0	2+0	0
	GK	(Scotland) SCO	Ross Laidlaw	2	0	2+0	0	0+0	0	0+0	0	0+0	0
	GK	(France) FRA	Ludovic Roy	0	0	0+0	0	0+0	0	0+0	0	0+0	0
	DF	(Scotland) SCO	Laurie Ellis	37	1	30+2	1	1+0	0	2+0	0	2+0	0
	DF	(Scotland) SCO	Dougie Hill	30	0	28+1	0	0+0	0	0+1	0	0+0	0
	DF	(Scotland) SCO	Grant Murray	41	2	36+0	2	1+0	0	2+0	0	2+0	0
	DF	(Scotland) SCO	Willie Dyer	38	0	30+4	0	0+0	0	2+0	0	2+0	0
	DF	(Scotland) SCO	Colin Wilson	1	0	0+1	0	0+0	0	0+0	0	0+0	0
	DF	(Scotland) SCO	Reece Donaldson	26	0	21+0	0	1+0	0	2+0	0	2+0	0
	DF	(Scotland) SCO	Jason Thomson	11	0	11+0	0	0+0	0	0+0	0	0+0	0
	MF	(Scotland) SCO	Ross Callachan	8	0	1+5	0	0+0	0	0+2	0	0+0	0
	MF	(Scotland) SCO	Iain Davidson	25	0	21+2	0	1+0	0	0+0	0	1+0	0
	MF	(Scotland) SCO	David Low	0	0	0+0	0	0+0	0	0+0	0	0+0	0
	MF	(Scotland) SCO	Scott McBride	6	0	1+3	0	0+0	0	1+0	0	0+1	0
	MF	(Scotland) SCO	Allan Walker	41	4	36+0	3	1+0	0	2+0	1	2+0	0
	MF	(Scotland) SCO	Andy Walls	1	0	0+0	0	0+0	0	0+1	0	0+0	0
	MF	(Scotland) SCO	Joe Hamill	38	3	30+3	3	1+0	0	2+0	0	2+0	0
	MF	(Scotland) SCO	Danny Thomson	16	1	4+8	0	0+0	0	2+0	1	1+1	0
	MF	(Germany) GER	Denis Prychynenko	5	1	4+1	1	0+0	0	0+0	0	0+0	0
	MF	(Scotland) SCO	Jason Holt	5	1	3+2	1	0+0	0	0+0	0	0+0	0
	MF	(Scotland) SCO	Jamie Walker	24	3	10+13	3	0+1	0	0+0	0	0+0	0
	MF	(Scotland) SCO	Lewis Vaughan	1	0	0+1	0	0+0	0	0+0	0	0+0	0
	MF	(Scotland) SCO	Jonny Stewart	4	0	1+3	0	0+0	0	0+0	0	0+0	0
	FW	(Scotland) SCO	Stephen Reynolds	15	1	1+10	1	0+0	0	1+1	0	0+2	0
	FW	(Scotland) SCO	John Baird	39	13	34+1	10	1+0	0	2+0	1	1+0	2
	FW	(Scotland) SCO	Brian Graham	28	11	19+5	11	0+0	0	1+1	0	2+0	0
	FW	(Scotland) SCO	Iain Williamson	31	2	17+10	1	1+0	0	1+0	1	2+0	0
	FW	(Scotland) SCO	David Smith	9	1	6+2	1	0+1	0	0+0	0	0+0	0
	FW	(Scotland) SCO	Pat Clarke	16	5	7+8	4	1+0	1	0+0	0	0+0	0
	FW	(Argentina) ARG	Damián Casalinuovo	16	3	9+6	3	1+0	0	0+0	0	0+0	0

=== Disciplinary record ===
Includes all competitive matches.

Last updated 5 May 2012

Nation	Position	Name	Scottish First Division		Scottish Cup		League Cup		Challenge Cup		Total	
Nation	Position	Name	Booked	Sent off (straight red)	Booked	Sent off (straight red)	Booked	Sent off (straight red)	Booked	Sent off (straight red)	Booked	Sent off (straight red)
(Scotland)	GK	David McGurn	3	0	0	0	0	0	0	0	3	0
(Scotland)	GK	Ross Laidlaw	0	0	0	0	0	0	0	0	0	0
(France)	GK	Ludovic Roy	0	0	0	0	0	0	0	0	0	0
(Scotland)	DF	Laurie Ellis	3	0	0	0	0	0	0	0	3	0
(Scotland)	DF	Dougie Hill	2	1	0	0	0	0	0	0	2	1
(Scotland)	DF	Grant Murray	3	0	1	0	0	0	0	0	4	0
(Scotland)	DF	Willie Dyer	5	0	0	0	1	0	1	0	7	0
(Scotland)	DF	Colin Wilson	0	0	0	0	0	0	0	0	0	0
(Scotland)	DF	Reece Donaldson	1	0	0	0	0	0	0	0	2	0
(Scotland)	DF	Jason Thomson	3	0	0	0	0	0	0	0	3	0
(Scotland)	MF	Ross Callachan	1	1	0	0	0	0	0	0	1	1
(Scotland)	MF	Iain Davidson	7	1	0	0	0	0	0	0	7	1
(Scotland)	MF	David Low	0	0	0	0	0	0	0	0	0	0
(Scotland)	MF	Scott McBride	0	0	0	0	0	0	0	0	0	0
(Scotland)	MF	Allan Walker	4	0	0	0	1	0	0	0	5	0
(Scotland)	MF	Andy Walls	0	0	0	0	0	0	0	0	0	0
(Scotland)	MF	Joe Hamill	2	0	0	0	0	0	0	0	2	0
(Scotland)	MF	Danny Thomson	0	0	0	0	0	0	0	0	0	0
(Germany)	MF	Denis Prychynenko	2	0	0	0	0	0	0	0	2	0
(Scotland)	MF	Jason Holt	0	0	0	0	0	0	0	0	0	0
(Scotland)	MF	Jamie Walker	3	0	0	0	0	0	0	0	3	0
(Scotland)	MF	Lewis Vaughan	0	0	0	0	0	0	0	0	0	0
(Scotland)	MF	Jonny Stewart	1	0	0	0	0	0	0	0	1	0
(Scotland)	FW	Stephen Reynolds	0	0	0	0	0	0	0	0	0	0
(Scotland)	FW	John Baird	5	0	0	0	1	0	0	0	6	0
(Scotland)	FW	Brian Graham	5	1	0	0	1	0	0	0	6	1
(Scotland)	FW	Iain Williamson	3	0	0	0	0	0	0	0	3	0
(Scotland)	FW	David Smith	0	0	0	0	0	0	0	0	0	0
(Scotland)	FW	Pat Clarke	1	0	1	0	0	0	0	0	2	0
(Argentina)	FW	Damián Casalinuovo	1	0	0	0	0	0	0	0	1	0

=== Awards ===
Last updated 14 May 2012

Nation	Name	Award	Month
(Scotland)	John McGlynn	First Division Manager of the Month	April

== League table ==
Pos	Team	Pld	W	D	L	GF	GA	GD	Pts	Promotion, qualification or relegation
5	Livingston	36	13	9	14	56	54	+2	48	
6	Partick Thistle	36	12	11	13	50	39	+11	47	
7	Raith Rovers	36	11	11	14	46	49	−3	44	
8	Greenock Morton	36	10	12	14	40	55	−15	42	
9	Ayr United (R)	36	9	11	16	44	67	−23	38	Qualification for the First Division play-offs

Source: SPFL Archive
Rules for classification: 1) points; 2) goal difference; 3) number of goals scored.
(R) Relegated

== Transfers ==
Rovers started the season by releasing 16 players.

=== Players in ===
Player	From	Fee
(Scotland) Brian Graham	(Scotland) Greenock Morton	Free
(Scotland) Joe Hamill	(Scotland) Livingston	Free
(Scotland) Stephen Reynolds	(Scotland) St Johnstone	Loan
(Scotland) Danny Thomson	(Scotland) Heart of Midlothian	Loan
(Germany) Denis Prychynenko	(Scotland) Heart of Midlothian	Loan
(Scotland) David Smith	(Scotland) Heart of Midlothian	Loan
(Scotland) Jamie Walker	(Scotland) Heart of Midlothian	Loan
(Scotland) Jason Holt	(Scotland) Heart of Midlothian	Loan
(France) Ludovic Roy	(Scotland) Cowdenbeath	Free
(Scotland) Pat Clarke	(Scotland) Dunfermline Athletic	Loan
(Argentina) Damián Casalinuovo	Free agent	Free
(Scotland) Johnny Stewart	(Scotland) Heart of Midlothian	Loan
(Scotland) Jason Thomson	(Scotland) Heart of Midlothian	Loan

=== Players out ===
Player	To	Fee
(Scotland) Graeme Beveridge	(Scotland) Elgin City	Free
(Scotland) Kevin Brown	(Iceland) BÍ/Bolungarvík	Free
(Scotland) Mark Campbell	(Scotland) Queen of the South	Free
(Scotland) Mark Ferry	(Scotland) Stirling Albion	Free
(Scotland) Tam Graham	(Scotland) Rosyth	Free
(Scotland) Jamie Mackie	(Scotland) Tayport	Free
(Scotland) Jordan McKechnie	(Scotland) Annan Athletic	Free
(Scotland) Andrew McNeil	(Scotland) Livingston	Free
(Scotland) Stephen Simmons	(Scotland) Queen of the South	Free
(Scotland) Jamie Stewart	Free agent	Free
(France) Grégory Tadé	(Scotland) Inverness Caledonian Thistle	Free
(Scotland) Gary Wales	Free agent	Free
(Scotland) Craig Wedderburn	(Scotland) Arbroath	Free
(Scotland) Graham Weir	(Scotland) Brechin City	Free
(Scotland) Craig Wilson	(Scotland) Forfar Athletic	Free
(Scotland) Ryan Logan	(Scotland) Heart of Midlothian	Free
(Scotland) Lee Bryce	(Scotland) Arbroath	Free
(Scotland) Ross Callachan	(Scotland) Musselburgh Athletic	Loan
(Scotland) Colin Wilson	(Scotland) Musselburgh Athletic	Loan
(France) Ludovic Roy	Free agent	Free
