= 2012–13 Raith Rovers F.C. season =

Raith Rovers
2012–13 season
- Manager: Grant Murray
- Stadium: Stark's Park
- Scottish First Division: 6th
- Challenge Cup: Quarter-finals (lost to Partick Thistle)
- League Cup: 3rd round (lost to Celtic)
- Scottish Cup: 5th round (lost to Celtic)
- Top goalscorer: League: Brian Graham (18); All: Brian Graham (27)
- Highest home attendance: 7,775 (v Celtic, 3 February 2013)
- Lowest home attendance: 773 (v Montrose, 14 August 2012)
- Average home league attendance: 1,953
Home colours	Away colours

The 2012–13 season was Raith Rovers' fourth consecutive season in the Scottish First Division, having been promoted from the Scottish Second Division at the end of the 2008–09 season. Raith Rovers also competed in the Challenge Cup, League Cup and the Scottish Cup.

== Management ==
Raith will be led by player-manager Grant Murray for the 2012–13 season, following the departure of John McGlynn. McGlynn signed a new one-year contract during the close season, and began leading the club for pre season. However, on 26 June 2012, McGlynn was appointed as the new manager of Heart of Midlothian, because he was under contract compensation was owed to Raith.

== Results & fixtures ==
Win Draw Loss Postponed

=== Preseason ===
A match against Alloa Athletic scheduled for 24 July, was cancelled.

10 July 2012 Friendly	Raith Rovers	1 – 1	Ross County	Stark's Park
19:45	Graham 16'	Raith Rovers Official Site Report	Morrow 8'	Referee: John Beaton

14 July 2012 Laurie Ellis Testimonial	Raith Rovers	0 – 3	Heart of Midlothian	Stark's Park
15:00		Hearts Report; Scotsman Report	Paterson 28'; Sutton 44'; Templeton 67'	Attendance: 2,907; Referee: Charleston

17 July 2012 Friendly	Raith Rovers	1 – 1	Motherwell	Stark's Park
19:45	Clarke 87'	Raith Rovers Official Site Report	Moore 69'	Attendance: 898; Referee: Finnie

21 July 2012 Friendly	Raith Rovers	1 – 2	Dundee United	Stark's Park
15:00	Graham 48'	Raith Report	Watson 86'; McLean 89'	Referee: Salmond

=== Scottish First Division ===
11 August 2012 Scottish First Division	Raith Rovers	2 – 0	Hamilton Academical	Stark's Park
15:00	Graham 63' (pen.), 86'	Raith Report		Attendance: 1,868; Referee: Madden

18 August 2012 Scottish First Division	Falkirk	0 – 2	Raith Rovers	Falkirk Stadium
15:00		Raith Report	Walker 45'; Clarke 47'	Attendance: 3,064; Referee: O'Reilly

25 August 2012 Scottish First Division	Raith Rovers	0 – 0	Livingston	Stark's Park
15:00		Raith Report		Attendance: 1,774; Referee: Colvin

1 September 2012 Scottish First Division	Dunfermline Athletic	3 – 1	Raith Rovers	East End Park
15:00	Wallace 25'; Falkingham 33'; Barrowman 56'	Raith Report	Graham 51'	Attendance: 5,634; Referee: Murray

15 September 2012 Scottish First Division	Raith Rovers	2 – 0	Airdrie United	Stark's Park
15:00	Graham 37'; Spence 83'	Raith Report		Attendance: 1,481; Referee: Allan

22 September 2012 Scottish First Division	Greenock Morton	1 – 0	Raith Rovers	Cappielow
15:00	Stirling 67'	Raith Report		Attendance: 1,628; Referee: Salmond

29 September 2012 Scottish First Division	Raith Rovers	1 – 1	Partick Thistle	Stark's Park
15:00	Spence 67'	Raith Report	Doolan 90'	Attendance: 1,957; Referee: Clancy

6 October 2012 Scottish First Division	Raith Rovers	2 – 2	Dumbarton	Stark's Park
15:00	Graham 23'; Spence 69'	Raith Report	Lister 52'; Prunty 90'	Attendance: 1,425; Referee: Tumilty

20 October 2012 Scottish First Division	Cowdenbeath	4 – 4	Raith Rovers	Central Park
15:00	Miller 6'; Stevenson 24'; Coult 78', 80'	Raith Report	Graham 35'; Spence 45'; Clarke 81'; Mensing 90'	Attendance: 1,209; Referee: Madden

27 October 2012 Scottish First Division	Hamilton Academical	0 – 1	Raith Rovers	New Douglas Park
15:00		Raith Report	Walker 45'	Attendance: 1,079; Referee: Colvin

10 November 2012 Scottish First Division	Raith Rovers	2 – 1	Falkirk	Stark's Park
15:00	Smith 56'; G.Anderson 85'	Raith Report	Leahy 43'	Attendance: 1,986; Referee: McKendrick

17 November 2012 Scottish First Division	Raith Rovers	1 – 3	Dunfermline Athletic	Stark's Park
15:00	Clarke 24'; Walker (red card) 45'; Hill (yellow card) 45' (red card)	Raith Report	Husband 37', 88'; Cardle 46'	Attendance: 4,294; Referee: Allan

24 November 2012 Scottish First Division	Airdrie United	0 – 0	Raith Rovers	Excelsior Stadium
15:00	Jack Boyle (yellow card) 63' (red card)	Raith Report		Attendance: 747; Referee: Beaton

8 December 2012 Scottish First Division	Raith Rovers	3 – 3	Greenock Morton	Stark's Park
15:00	Graham 23', 71'; Spence 85'	Raith Report	Rutkiewicz 8'; O'Brien 65'; Hardie 88'	Attendance: 1,375; Referee: McLean

15 December 2012 Scottish First Division	Partick Thistle	3 – 2	Raith Rovers	Firhill Stadium
15:00	Bannigan 21'; Lawless 32'; Craig 87'	Raith Report	Spence 13'; Graham 81'	Attendance: 2,221; Referee: Clancy

22 December 2012 Scottish First Division	Dumbarton	P – P	Raith Rovers	Dumbarton Football Stadium
15:00		Raith Report
Note: Postponed due to waterlogged pitch

29 December 2012 Scottish First Division	Raith Rovers	2 – 2	Cowdenbeath	Stark's Park
15:00	Hill 50'; Spence 53'	Raith Report	Milne 9'; Stevenson 42' (pen.)	Attendance: 1,877; Referee: Murray

2 January 2013 Scottish First Division	Dunfermline Athletic	1 – 0	Raith Rovers	East End Park
15:00	Geggan 71'	Raith Report		Attendance: 5,835; Referee: Charleston

5 January 2013 Scottish First Division	Raith Rovers	2 – 0	Airdrie United	Stark's Park
15:00	Graham 35'; Clarke 61'	Raith Report		Attendance: 1,270; Referee: Collum

12 January 2013 Scottish First Division	Livingston	2 – 1	Raith Rovers	Almondvale Stadium
15:00	Russell 29'; Barr 49'	Raith Report	Graham 34'	Attendance: 1,424; Referee: Madden

19 January 2013 Scottish First Division	Raith Rovers	0 – 2	Hamilton Academical	Stark's Park
15:00	Hill (red card) 83'	Raith Report	Ellis 89' (o.g.); May 90'	Attendance: 1,194; Referee: Salmond

26 January 2013 Scottish First Division	Greenock Morton	1 – 0	Raith Rovers	Cappielow
15:00	Tidser 53'	Raith Report		Attendance: 2,006; Referee: Clancy

9 February 2013 Scottish First Division	Raith Rovers	P – P	Partick Thistle	Stark's Park
15:00		BBC Report
Note: Postponed due to a waterlogged pitch

16 February 2013 Scottish First Division	Raith Rovers	3 – 2	Dumbarton	Stark's Park
15:00	Walker 39'; Clarke 52'; Graham 90'	Raith Report	Prunty 45', 58'	Attendance: 1,304; Referee: Charleston

23 February 2013 Scottish First Division	Cowdenbeath	1 – 1	Raith Rovers	Central Park
15:00	Stewart 81'	Raith Report	Graham 48'	Attendance: 1,078; Referee: Colvin

5 March 2013 Scottish First Division	Falkirk	1 – 1	Raith Rovers	Falkirk Stadium
15:00	Murdoch 90'	Raith Report	Graham 30'	Attendance: 2,428; Referee: Muir

9 March 2013 Scottish First Division	Raith Rovers	0 – 2	Livingston	Stark's Park
15:00		Raith Report	Russell 20' (pen.); Scougall 35'	Attendance: 1,117; Referee: Somers

12 March 2013 Scottish First Division	Raith Rovers	P – P	Partick Thistle	Stark's Park
19:45		BBC Report
Note: Postponed due to a frozen pitch

16 March 2013 Scottish First Division	Raith Rovers	1 – 1	Dunfermline Athletic	Stark's Park
15:00	Spence 39'	Raith Report	Geggan 58'	Attendance: 3,733; Referee: Beaton

23 March 2013 Scottish First Division	Airdrie United	1 – 2	Raith Rovers	Excelsior Stadium
15:00	Bain 7'	Raith Report	Spence 44'; G.Anderson 78'	Attendance: 554; Referee: Roache

27 March 2013 Scottish First Division	Dumbarton	4 – 2	Raith Rovers	Dumbarton Football Stadium
19:30	Lister 36', 64', 84'; Agnew 70' (pen.)	Raith Report	Spence 4'; G.Anderson 25'	Attendance: 483; Referee: Madden

30 March 2013 Scottish First Division	Raith Rovers	2 – 1	Greenock Morton	Stark's Park
15:00	Graham 12'; Tidser 38' (o.g.)	Raith Report	Wilkie 72'	Attendance: 1,529; Referee: Allan

2 April 2013 Scottish First Division	Raith Rovers	0 – 0	Partick Thistle	Stark's Park
19:45		Raith Report	Muirhead (yellow card) 58' (red card)	Attendance: 1,761; Referee: Murray

9 April 2013 Scottish First Division	Dumbarton	1 – 2	Raith Rovers	Dumbarton Football Stadium
19:30	Gilhaney 70'	Raith Report	Spence 14'; Graham 75'	Attendance: 553; Referee: Somers

13 April 2013 Scottish First Division	Raith Rovers	0 – 1	Cowdenbeath	Stark's Park
15:00		Raith Report	Stevenson 41'	Attendance: 1,574; Referee: Collum

16 April 2013 Scottish First Division	Partick Thistle	0 – 0	Raith Rovers	Firhill Stadium
19:45		Raith Report		Attendance: 4,963; Referee: Clancy

20 April 2013 Scottish First Division	Hamilton Academical	2 – 0	Raith Rovers	New Douglas Park
15:00	May 52'; Ryan 90'	Raith Report		Attendance: 969; Referee: Allan

27 April 2013 Scottish First Division	Raith Rovers	0 – 0	Falkirk	Stark's Park
15:00		Raith Report		Attendance: 1,406; Referee: McLean

4 May 2013 Scottish First Division	Livingston	2 – 3	Raith Rovers	Almondvale Stadium
15:00	Fox 45' (pen.); Russell 90'	Raith Report	G.Anderson 21'; Graham 82', 90'	Attendance: 1,302; Referee: Roache

=== Scottish Challenge Cup ===
28 July 2012 Scottish Challenge Cup round 1	Wick Academy	2 – 4	Raith Rovers	Harmsworth Park
15:00	Geruzel 51'; Allan 61'	Raith Report	Graham 39'; Hill 57'; G.Anderson 71'; Clarke 82'	Attendance: 980; Referee: Somers

14 August 2012 Scottish Challenge Cup round 2	Raith Rovers	5 – 2	Montrose	Stark's Park
19:45	Walker 7'; Graham 32', 54'; McGurn (red card) 44'; Clarke 42'; Spence 90'	Raith Report	Watson 45' (pen.); Young 77'	Attendance: 773; Referee: Finnie

9 September 2012 Scottish Challenge Cup QF	Partick Thistle	3 – 0	Raith Rovers	Firhill Stadium
16:05	Erskine 50', 58'; Craig 53'			Attendance: 1,807; Referee: Charleston

=== Scottish League Cup ===
4 August 2012 Scottish League Cup round 1	Raith Rovers	4 – 3	Berwick Rangers	Stark's Park
15:00	Graham 25', 73'; Hill 58'; Clarke 85'	SFL Report	Currie 9', 65'; Addison 50'	Attendance: 1,071; Referee: Norris

28 August 2012 Scottish League Cup round 2	Ross County	1 – 4	Raith Rovers	Global Energy Stadium
19:45	Duncan 84'	SFL Report	Spence 25'; Graham 41', 63'; Hill 51'	Attendance: 1,147; Referee: McKendrick

25 September 2012 Scottish League Cup round 3	Celtic	4 – 1	Raith Rovers	Celtic Park
19:45	Hooper 12', 37', 58', 60'	SFL Report	Walker 28'	Attendance: 14,737; Referee: Muir

=== Scottish Cup ===
3 November 2012 Scottish Cup round 3	Airdrie United	2 – 2	Raith Rovers	Excelsior Stadium
15:00	Griffin 28'; Thomson 78' (o.g.)	Raith Report	Mensing 13'; Graham (red card) 47'; Spence 90'	Attendance: 854; Referee: Finnie

13 November 2012 Scottish Cup round 3 replay	Raith Rovers	4 – 3 (a.e.t.)	Airdrie United	Stark's Park
19:45	Spence 5'; Walker 21' (pen.); G.Anderson 55'; Hill 99'	Raith Report	Watt 3'; Di Giacomo 45' (pen.); Buchanan 86'	Attendance: 935; Referee: Finnie

1 December 2012 Scottish Cup round 4	Raith Rovers	2 – 1	Deveronvale	Stark's Park
15:00	Graham 55', 89'; Hill (red card) 57'	Raith Report	Fraser 58' (pen.)	Attendance: 1,439; Referee: Robertson

3 February 2013 Scottish Cup round 5	Raith Rovers	0 – 3	Celtic	Stark's Park
12:45		Raith Report	Commons 56' (pen.); Forrest 83'; Mulgrew 86'	Attendance: 7,775; Referee: McLean

== Player statistics ==
=== Captains ===
No.	P	Name	Country	No. games	Notes
	MF	Allan Walker	(Scotland)		Club captain

Last updated: May 2011
Source: Competitive match reports.
Competitive matches only
Matches started as captain only
Country: FIFA nationality; No.: Squad number; P: Position; Name: Player name; No. Games: Number of games started as captain.

=== Squad ===
Last updated May 2013

No.	Pos	Nat	Player	Total		First Division		Challenge Cup		League Cup		Scottish Cup	
No.	Pos	Nat	Player	Apps	Goals	Apps	Goals	Apps	Goals	Apps	Goals	Apps	Goals
	GK	(Scotland) SCO	Ross Laidlaw	14	0	9+1	0	0+1	0	0+0	0	3+0	0
	GK	(Scotland) SCO	David McGurn	33	0	27+0	0	2+0	0	3+0	0	1+0	0
	GK	(Scotland) SCO	Allan Fleming	1	0	0+0	0	1+0	0	0+0	0	0+0	0
	DF	(Scotland) SCO	Reece Donaldson	10	0	2+4	0	1+0	0	0+1	0	1+1	0
	DF	(Scotland) SCO	Laurie Ellis	34	0	23+2	0	1+1	0	2+1	0	3+1	0
	DF	(Scotland) SCO	Dougie Hill	33	4	23+2	1	2+0	1	3+0	1	3+0	1
	DF	(Scotland) SCO	Eddie Malone	43	0	30+4	0	3+0	0	3+0	0	3+0	0
	DF	(Scotland) SCO	Grant Murray	12	0	9+1	0	2+0	0	0+0	0	0+0	0
	DF	(Scotland) SCO	Jason Thomson	45	0	35+0	0	3+0	0	3+0	0	4+0	0
	DF	(Scotland) SCO	Colin Wilson	2	0	1+0	0	0+0	0	0+1	0	0+0	0
	DF	(Scotland) SCO	Liam Gordon	0	0	0+0	0	0+0	0	0+0	0	0+0	0
	DF	(England) ENG	Simon Mensing	32	2	27+0	1	0+0	0	1+0	0	4+0	1
	MF	(Scotland) SCO	Ross Callachan	17	0	4+6	0	0+3	0	0+2	0	0+2	0
	MF	(Scotland) SCO	Joe Hamill	36	0	23+4	0	3+0	0	3+0	0	3+0	0
	MF	(Scotland) SCO	Allan Walker	43	6	35+0	3	2+0	1	3+0	1	3+0	1
	MF	(Scotland) SCO	Lewis Vaughan	3	0	0+3	0	0+0	0	0+0	0	0+0	0
	MF	(Scotland) SCO	Grant Anderson	42	6	27+6	4	3+0	1	2+0	0	2+2	1
	MF	(Scotland) SCO	Stuart Anderson	43	0	26+6	0	3+0	0	3+1	0	3+1	0
	MF	(Scotland) SCO	Josh Watt	6	0	3+3	0	0+0	0	0+0	0	0+0	0
	MF	(England) ENG	Joe Cardle	7	0	4+3	0	0+0	0	0+0	0	0+0	0
	FW	(Scotland) SCO	Pat Clarke	35	7	17+9	5	3+0	2	2+0	0	4+0	0
	FW	(Scotland) SCO	Brian Graham	43	27	33+1	18	3+0	3	3+0	4	3+0	2
	FW	(Scotland) SCO	David Smith	24	1	16+3	1	0+1	0	0+1	0	2+1	0
	FW	(Scotland) SCO	Greig Spence	40	14	22+9	10	0+2	1	2+1	1	2+2	2
	FW	(Scotland) SCO	Jamie Watson	0	0	0+0	0	0+0	0	0+0	0	0+0	0

=== Disciplinary record ===
Includes all competitive matches.

Last updated May 2013

Nation	Position	Name	First Division		Challenge Cup		League Cup		Scottish Cup		Total	
Nation	Position	Name	Booked	Sent off (straight red)	Booked	Sent off (straight red)	Booked	Sent off (straight red)	Booked	Sent off (straight red)	Booked	Sent off (straight red)
(Scotland)	GK	Ross Laidlaw	0	0	0	0	0	0	1	0	1	0
(Scotland)	GK	David McGurn	0	0	0	1	0	0	0	0	0	1
(Scotland)	GK	Allan Fleming	0	0	0	0	0	0	0	0	0	0
(Scotland)	DF	Reece Donaldson	1	0	1	0	0	0	0	0	2	0
(Scotland)	DF	Laurie Ellis	5	0	0	0	1	0	1	0	7	0
(Scotland)	DF	Dougie Hill	6	2	2	0	0	0	1	1	9	3
(Scotland)	DF	Eddie Malone	6	0	0	0	0	0	0	0	6	0
(Scotland)	DF	Grant Murray	1	0	1	0	0	0	0	0	2	0
(Scotland)	DF	Jason Thomson	10	0	0	0	0	0	1	0	11	0
(Scotland)	DF	Colin Wilson	0	0	0	0	0	0	0	0	0	0
(Scotland)	DF	Liam Gordon	0	0	0	0	0	0	0	0	0	0
(England)	DF	Simon Mensing	8	0	0	0	0	0	0	0	8	0
(Scotland)	MF	Ross Callachan	0	0	0	0	0	0	0	0	0	0
(Scotland)	MF	Joe Hamill	2	0	0	0	0	0	0	0	2	0
(Scotland)	MF	Allan Walker	6	1	0	0	0	0	1	0	7	1
(Scotland)	MF	Lewis Vaughan	0	0	0	0	0	0	0	0	0	0
(Scotland)	MF	Grant Anderson	5	0	1	0	1	0	0	0	7	0
(Scotland)	MF	Stuart Anderson	5	0	2	0	0	0	1	0	8	0
(Scotland)	MF	Josh Watt	0	0	0	0	0	0	0	0	0	0
(England)	MF	Joe Cardle	0	0	0	0	0	0	0	0	0	0
(Scotland)	FW	Pat Clarke	3	0	0	0	0	0	2	0	5	0
(Scotland)	FW	Brian Graham	4	0	0	0	0	0	0	1	4	1
(Scotland)	FW	David Smith	1	0	0	0	0	0	0	0	1	0
(Scotland)	FW	Greig Spence	3	0	0	0	0	0	0	0	3	0
(Scotland)	FW	Jamie Watson	0	0	0	0	0	0	0	0	0	0

== Team statistics ==
=== League table ===
Pos	Team	Pld	W	D	L	GF	GA	GD	Pts
4	Livingston	36	14	10	12	58	56	+2	52
5	Hamilton Academical	36	14	9	13	52	45	+7	51
6	Raith Rovers	36	11	13	12	45	48	−3	46
7	Dumbarton	36	13	4	19	58	83	−25	43
8	Cowdenbeath	36	8	12	16	51	65	−14	36

Source: SPFL Archive
Rules for classification: 1) points; 2) goal difference; 3) number of goals scored.

=== Division summary ===
Round	1	2	3	4	5	6	7	8	9	10	11	12	13	14	15	16	17	18	19	20	21	22	23	24	25	26	27	28	29	30	31	32	33	34	35	36
Ground	H	A	H	A	H	A	H	H	A	A	H	H	A	H	A	A	H	A	H	A	H	A	H	H	A	A	H	H	A	H	A	A	H	A	H	A
Result	W	W	D	L	W	L	D	D	D	W	W	L	D	D	L	L	D	L	W	L	L	L	D	W	D	D	L	L	W	W	D	W	L	L	D	W
Position	4	2	2	4	3	4	4	4	4	4	4	5	4	5	5	6	6	6	4	5	5	6	6	6	6	6	6	6	6	6	6	6	6	6	6	6

Updated to match(es) played on 4 May 2013. Source:
A = Away; H = Home; W = Win; D = Draw; L = Loss

== Transfers ==
=== Players in ===
Player	From	Fee
(Scotland) Eddie Malone	(Scotland) Ayr United	Free
(Scotland) Jason Thomson	(Scotland) Heart of Midlothian	Free
(Scotland) Pat Clarke	(Scotland) Dunfermline Athletic	Free
(Scotland) Grant Anderson	(Scotland) Hamilton Academical	Free
(Scotland) Stuart Anderson	(England) Salisbury City	Free
(Scotland) Greig Spence	(Scotland) Celtic	Free
(Scotland) David Smith	(Scotland) Heart of Midlothian	Loan
(England) Simon Mensing	(Scotland) Hamilton Academical	Free
(Scotland) Josh Watt	(Scotland) Motherwell	Loan
(England) Joe Cardle	(Scotland) Dunfermline Athletic	Free

=== Players out ===
Player	To	Fee
(Scotland) Willie Dyer	(Scotland) Greenock Morton	Free
(Scotland) John Baird	(Scotland) Dundee	Free
(Scotland) Iain Davidson	(Scotland) Dundee	Free
(Scotland) Mark Aitken		Free
(Argentina) Damian Casalinuovo		Free
(France) Samir Dghoughi		Free
(Scotland) James Forsyth		Free
(Scotland) Scott McBride	(Scotland) East Fife	Free
(Scotland) Dayle McGaw		Free
(Scotland) Jordan Roberts		Free
(Scotland) Jamie Stewart		Free
(Scotland) Andy Walls	(Scotland) Lochee United	Free
(Scotland) Iain Williamson	(Iceland) Grindavík	Free
(Scotland) Jordan Wright		Free
(Scotland) Paul Millar	(Scotland) Broxburn Athletic	Free
(Scotland) Liam Gordon	(Scotland) Heart of Midlothian	Undisclosed
(Scotland) Colin Wilson		Free
