= Ross Laidlaw =

Scottish footballer

Personal information
- Date of birth: 12 July 1992 (age 34)
- Place of birth: Livingston, Scotland
- Height: 6 ft 7 in (2.01 m)
- Position: Goalkeeper

Youth career
- Raith Rovers

Senior career*
| Years | Team | Apps | (Gls) |
| 2011–2016 | Raith Rovers | 32 | (0) |
| 2014–2015 | → Elgin City (loan) | 14 | (0) |
| 2016–2019 | Hibernian | 19 | (0) |
| 2019 | → Dundee United (loan) | 1 | (0) |
| 2019–2026 | Ross County | 155 | (0) |
| 2026 | Strathspey Thistle | 4 | (0) |
- * Club domestic league appearances and goals as of 13:49, 18 October 2026 (UTC)

Ross Laidlaw (born 12 July 1992) is a Scottish footballer who last played as a goalkeeper for Highland League club, Strathspey Thistle. He has also previously played for Raith Rovers, Elgin City, Hibernian, Dundee United and Ross County.

== Career ==
=== Raith Rovers ===
Laidlaw began his playing career for the Raith Rovers under-19 side. He progressed to the senior side and appeared on bench on two occasions during the 2010–11 season. He featured in pre-season friendly matches in advance of the 2011–12 season, the final of which was against Southend United in a scoreless draw. Following the departure of Andrew McNeil he became the regular back-up goalkeeper to David McGurn.

However he suffered a setback, injuring his knee, with Raith having to sign Ludovic Roy as a temporary replacement. After recovering from injury, Laidlaw made his senior debut on 3 March 2012, keeping a clean sheet in a 5–0 home victory against Greenock Morton.

On 22 January 2015, he joined Elgin City on loan. His last game for Elgin was in April 2015, a 5–4 defeat against Annan Athletic. Laidlaw returned to Raith after this loan spell, but failed to displace Kevin Cuthbert as first-choice goalkeeper. In December 2015 he suffered a torn kidney, which kept him out of action for the rest of the season. Laidlaw left Raith at the end of the 2015–16 season.

=== Hibernian ===
On 6 July 2016, Laidlaw signed a one-year contract with Hibernian. He made his first appearance for Hibernian in the second leg of a Europa League qualifier against Brondby. Laidlaw kept a clean sheet as Hibs won 1–0 in the second leg, but were knocked out of the competition after a penalty shootout. Although he mainly served as a backup to Ofir Marciano during the 2016–17 season, Laidlaw made 18 first team appearances.

He signed a two-year contract with Hibs in May 2017. Laidlaw temporarily took over as first choice goalkeeper in September, as Marciano missed one game due to him observing Yom Kippur. He injured a shoulder in November, and this eventually required surgery. Laidlaw returned to first-team training in June 2018. He made his first appearance since injury on 9 August, in a Europa League qualifier against Molde.

Laidlaw moved on loan to Championship club Dundee United in January 2019. In May 2019, Hibs announced that Laidlaw would be released at the end of the season.

=== Ross County ===
On 30 May 2019 Laidlaw signed for newly promoted Scottish Premiership team Ross County on a two-year contract. On 13 July 2019, he made his debut for Ross County against Montrose in the Scottish League Cup. After winning Ross County's player of the year award for the 2020-21 season Laidlaw signed a new two-year contract with the club. On 3 January 2023 Laidlaw singled a three-and-a-half-year contract keeping him at County until the summer of 2026. Laidlaw announced his departure from Ross County via an Instagram post on the 3rd of May 2026.

Following his departure from Ross County, Laidlaw briefly signed for Highland League side, Strathspey Thistle, before leaving the club in October 2026 for a coaching role in Dubai.

== Career statistics ==
As of 6 December 2025

Appearances and goals by club, season and competition
| Club | Season | League | | | Cup | | League Cup | | Other | | Total | |
| Club | Season | Division | Apps | Goals | Apps | Goals | Apps | Goals | Apps | Goals | Apps | Goals |
|---|---|---|---|---|---|---|---|---|---|---|---|---|
| Raith Rovers | 2011–12 | Scottish First Division | 2 | 0 | 0 | 0 | 0 | 0 | 0 | 0 | 2 | 0 |
| Raith Rovers | 2012–13 | Scottish First Division | 10 | 0 | 1 | 0 | 0 | 0 | 1 (Note: Appearances in Scottish Challenge Cup) | 0 | 12 | 0 |
| Raith Rovers | 2013–14 | Scottish Championship | 13 | 0 | 3 | 0 | 0 | 0 | 0 | 0 | 16 | 0 |
| Raith Rovers | 2014–15 | Scottish Championship | 7 | 0 | 0 | 0 | 0 | 0 | 0 | 0 | 7 | 0 |
| Raith Rovers | 2015–16 | Scottish Championship | 0 | 0 | 0 | 0 | 0 | 0 | 0 | 0 | 0 | 0 |
| Raith Rovers | Total | | 32 | 0 | 4 | 0 | 0 | 0 | 1 | 0 | 37 | 0 |
| Elgin City (loan) | 2014–15 | Scottish League Two | 14 | 0 | 0 | 0 | 0 | 0 | 0 | 0 | 14 | 0 |
| Hibernian | 2016–17 (Note: Soccerbase did not record an appearance made by Laidlaw against Brøndby on 21 July 2016.) | Scottish Championship | 15 | 0 | 1 | 0 | 1 | 0 | 1 (Note: Appearances in the UEFA Europa League) | 0 | 18 | 0 |
| Hibernian | 2017–18 | Scottish Premiership | 3 | 0 | 0 | 0 | 3 | 0 | — | | 6 | 0 |
| Hibernian | 2018–19 (Note: Soccerbase did not record an appearance made by Laidlaw against Molde on 9 August 2018.) | Scottish Premiership | 1 | 0 | 0 | 0 | 1 | 0 | 1 | 0 | 3 | 0 |
| Hibernian | Total | | 19 | 0 | 1 | 0 | 5 | 0 | 2 | 0 | 27 | 0 |
| Dundee United (loan) | 2018–19 | Scottish Championship | 1 | 0 | 0 | 0 | 0 | 0 | 0 | 0 | 1 | 0 |
| Ross County | 2019–20 | Scottish Premiership | 17 | 0 | 0 | 0 | 5 | 0 | — | | 22 | 0 |
| Ross County | 2020–21 | Scottish Premiership | 33 | 0 | 1 | 0 | 6 | 0 | — | | 40 | 0 |
| Ross County | 2021–22 | Scottish Premiership | 20 | 0 | 1 | 0 | 2 | 0 | — | | 23 | 0 |
| Ross County | 2022–23 | Scottish Premiership | 38 | 0 | 1 | 0 | 2 | 0 | 2 (Note: Appearances in 2022–23 Scottish Premiership play-offs) | 0 | 43 | 0 |
| Ross County | 2023–24 | Scottish Premiership | 25 | 0 | 0 | 0 | 3 | 0 | 2 (Note: Appearances in 2023–24 Scottish Premiership play-offs) | 0 | 30 | 0 |
| Ross County | 2024–25 | Scottish Premiership | 15 | 0 | 0 | 0 | 3 | 0 | — | | 18 | 0 |
| Ross County | 2025–26 | Scottish Championship | 7 | 0 | 1 | 0 | 2 | 0 | — | | 10 | 0 |
| Ross County | Total | | 155 | 0 | 4 | 0 | 23 | 0 | 4 | 0 | 186 | 0 |
| Career total | | | 221 | 0 | 9 | 0 | 28 | 0 | 7 | 0 | 265 | 0 |

== Honours ==
Raith Rovers

- Scottish Challenge Cup: 2013–14

Hibernian

- Scottish Championship: 2016–17
