= Reece Donaldson =

Scottish footballer (born 1994)

Personal information
- Date of birth: 9 January 1994 (age 32)
- Place of birth: Edinburgh, Scotland
- Position: Defender

Youth career
- Edina Hibs
- Raith Rovers

Senior career*
Years	Team	Apps	(Gls)
2010–2014	Raith Rovers	39	(0)
2013	→ Peterhead (loan)	7	(1)
2014–2015	Peterhead	1	(0)
2015–2016	East Stirlingshire	24	(1)
2016–2017	Linlithgow Rose		
- * Club domestic league appearances and goals

Reece Donaldson (born 9 January 1994) is a Scottish former footballer. He has previously played for Raith Rovers and Peterhead.

== Career ==
Donaldson joined Raith aged 14 as a member of their youth academy, from Edina Hibs youth team. He was promoted to the senior squad in June 2010, signing a full-time contract He made his first team debut aged 17, on 7 May 2011, as a substitute in Raith Rovers' 3–0 defeat against Partick Thistle in the Scottish First Division. Having firmly broken into the first team at the start of the following season, Donaldson was given a two-year contract extension confirming his stay until 2014. At the end of his contract he was released by the club.

Donaldson joined Peterhead on loan on 14 November 2013. He made his debut on 16 November 2013, as Peterhead drew 1–1 with East Stirlingshire. He scored his first goal on 7 December 2013, in a 3–1 win away at Clyde. His loan ended early when he was recalled by Raith Rovers on 31 December 2013.

After his release by Raith Rovers, Donaldson agreed a deal to sign for Peterhead on a permanent basis. At the end of the 2014–15 season, Donaldson was released by Peterhead and within a few days of leaving The Blue Toon, Donaldson signed for Scottish League Two side East Stirlingshire.

Donaldson had a loan spell at Linlithgow Rose in 2016-2017.

== Career statistics ==
As of 11 August 2014

Club statistics
Club	Season	League		Scottish Cup		League Cup		Other		Total	
Club	Season	App	Goals	App	Goals	App	Goals	App	Goals	App	Goals
Raith Rovers	2010–11	1	0	0	0	0	0	0	0	1	0
Raith Rovers	2011–12	21	0	1	0	2	0	2	0	26	0
Raith Rovers	2012–13	7	0	2	0	1	0	1	0	11	0
Raith Rovers	2013–14	10	0	1	0	0	0	1	0	12	0
Raith Rovers	Total	39	0	4	0	3	0	4	0	50	0
Peterhead (loan)	2013–14	7	1	0	0	0	0	0	0	7	1
Peterhead	2014–15	1	0	0	0	1	0	1	0	3	0
Career total		47	1	4	0	4	0	5	0	60	1

== Honours ==
Raith Rovers

- Scottish Challenge Cup: 2013–14
