= Colin Wilson (Scottish footballer) =

Scottish footballer

Personal information
- Full name: Colin Wilson
- Date of birth: 19 May 1993 (age 33)
- Place of birth: Scotland
- Height: 1.83 m (6 ft 0 in)
- Position: Defender

Youth career
- Raith Rovers

Senior career*
Years	Team	Apps	(Gls)
2011–2013	Raith Rovers	2	(0)
2012	→ Musselburgh Athletic (loan)	2	(0)
2013–2014	Montrose	19	(0)
- * Club domestic league appearances and goals as of 15 January 2014

Colin Wilson (born 19 May 1993) is a Scottish footballer, who played as a defender for Raith Rovers and Montrose.

== Career ==
Wilson progressed through the youth sides before earning a full-time contract with Raith Rovers in June 2010. He featured in pre-season friendly matches in advance of the 2011–12 season, such as the 0–0 draw against English side Southend United.

Wilson made his senior debut on 12 November 2011 as a substitute for Dougie Hill in a 1–0 defeat against Ayr United in a Scottish First Division fixture.

In March 2012 he joined junior side Musselburgh Athletic on loan until the end of the season.

== Career statistics ==
As of 22 September 2012.

Club	Season	League		Cup		League Cup		Other^{[a]}		Total	
Club	Season	Apps	Goals	Apps	Goals	Apps	Goals	Apps	Goals	Apps	Goals
Raith Rovers	2011–12	1	0	0	0	0	0	0	0	1	0
Raith Rovers	2012–13	1	0	0	0	1	0	0	0	2	0
Raith Rovers	Total	2	0	0	0	1	0	0	0	3	0
Musselburgh Athletic (loan)	2011–12	2	0	0	0	0	0	1	0	3	0
Career total		4	0	0	0	1	0	1	0	6	0

a. Includes other competitive competitions, including the Scottish Challenge Cup & East of Scotland Cup.
