= Ross Callachan =

Scottish footballer

Personal information
- Date of birth: 4 September 1993 (age 33)
- Place of birth: Edinburgh, Scotland
- Position: Midfielder

Youth career
- 2006–2010: Raith Rovers

Senior career*
Years	Team	Apps	(Gls)
2010–2017	Raith Rovers	129	(7)
2012	→ Musselburgh Athletic (loan)	1	(0)
2017–2018	Heart of Midlothian	23	(4)
2018–2020	St Johnstone	26	(1)
2020	→ Dundee (loan)	3	(0)
2020–2021	Hamilton Academical	33	(10)
2021–2024	Ross County	59	(5)
2024–2025	Motherwell	1	(0)
2025–2026	Arbroath	7	(1)
Total		282	(28)
- * Club domestic league appearances and goals

Ross Callachan (born 4 September 1993) is a former professional footballer who played as a midfielder. During his career, he played for Raith Rovers, Musselburgh Athletic, Heart of Midlothian, St Johnstone, Dundee, Hamilton Academical, Ross County, Motherwell and Arbroath.

== Club career ==
=== Raith Rovers ===
Callachan came through the youth system at Raith Rovers. He was promoted to the first team after agreeing a full-time contract with the club as a 16-year-old in June 2010.

He spent much of the 2010–11 season in the reserves. He did, however, make his first team league debut in the final match of the campaign, replacing teammate Iain Williamson as a 60th-minute substitute in a 3–0 defeat against Partick Thistle on 7 May 2011.

His first game in the following 2011–12 season was in the second round of the Scottish League Cup. Raith Rovers recorded a convincing 4–1 victory over Montrose in this July 2011 fixture, with Callachan appearing as a second-half substitute.

In March 2012 he joined Musselburgh Athletic on loan until the end of the season.

=== Heart of Midlothian ===
On 31 August 2017, Callachan signed for Heart of Midlothian on a two-year deal, for an undisclosed transfer fee.

=== St Johnstone ===
After one season at Hearts, Callachan signed for St Johnstone on a two-year deal before the closing of the Summer transfer window. He scored his first goal for St. Johnstone on 29 September 2018 against his former club Hearts in a 2–1 defeat at Tynecastle.

==== Loan to Dundee ====
Callachan joined Dundee on loan in January 2020 for the rest of the season. After just a few weeks with Dundee however, Callachan suffered a leg fracture during a game against Partick Thistle that kept him out for the rest of the season. In May, St Johnstone announced Callachan would be one of a few players to leave the club once his contract ended at the end of the month.

=== Hamilton Academical ===
On 29 June 2020, Hamilton Academical's chairman confirmed that Callachan had signed for Accies.

=== Ross County ===
Callachan signed a two-year contract with Ross County in June 2021. After playing a key role for the Staggies over two seasons, Callachan would be sidelined for an extended period after rupturing his ACL in April 2023, and would miss the entire 2023–24 season as a result.

=== Motherwell ===
On 19 June 2024, Callachan joined Motherwell on a one-year deal upon expiration of his contract with Ross County. Callachan made his debut for the Steelmen on 3 August 2024, 16 months after his injury, in the league opener against his former club Ross County. Shortly after, Motherwell manager Stuart Kettlewell confirmed that Callachan had picked up a "bad" hamstring injury which would keep him out for the remainder of the season. At the end of the season, Motherwell confirmed that Callachan was departing the club upon the expiry of his contract.

=== Arbroath ===
On 27 June 2025, Callachan joined the newly-promoted Scottish Championship club Arbroath on a permanent deal. On 22 July 2025, Callachan played his first competitive minutes in nearly a year in a 6–0 Arbroath home win over Annan Athletic in the League Cup. On 9 August, Callachan scored his first goal since October 2022 in a league win away to Queen's Park. On 4 June 2026, Arbroath announced Callachan's departure. The following month, Callachan retired from professional football.

== Career statistics ==
As of match played 30 August 2025

Appearances and goals by club, season and competition
Club	Season	League			National Cup		League Cup		Other		Total	
Club	Season	Division	Apps	Goals	Apps	Goals	Apps	Goals	Apps	Goals	Apps	Goals
Raith Rovers	2010–11	Scottish First Division	1	0	0	0	0	0	0	0	1	0
Raith Rovers	2011–12	Scottish First Division	6	0	0	0	2	0	0	0	8	0
Raith Rovers	2012–13	Scottish First Division	10	0	2	0	2	0	3 (Note: Appearances in the Scottish Challenge Cup)	0	17	0
Raith Rovers	2013–14	Scottish Championship	28	0	3	0	2	0	1	0	34	0
Raith Rovers	2014–15	Scottish Championship	25	2	3	0	2	0	1	0	31	2
Raith Rovers	2015–16	Scottish Championship	25	2	2	0	1	0	4 (Note: Two appearances in the Scottish Challenge Cup and two appearances in the Scottish Premiership play-offs)	0	32	2
Raith Rovers	2016–17	Scottish Championship	30	3	2	0	4	0	1	0	37	3
Raith Rovers	2017–18	Scottish League One	4	0	0	0	4	0	1	1	9	1
Raith Rovers	Total		129	7	12	0	17	0	11	1	169	8
Musselburgh Athletic (loan)	2011–12	East SuperLeague	1	0	0	0	0	0	0	0	1	0
Heart of Midlothian	2017–18	Scottish Premiership	23	4	2	0	0	0	—		25	4
Heart of Midlothian	2018–19	Scottish Premiership	0	0	0	0	0	0	—		0	0
Heart of Midlothian	Total		23	4	2	0	0	0	0	0	25	4
St. Johnstone	2018–19	Scottish Premiership	24	1	2	0	1	0	—		27	1
St. Johnstone	2019–20	Scottish Premiership	2	0	0	0	2	0	—		4	0
St. Johnstone	Total		26	1	2	0	3	0	0	0	31	1
Dundee (loan)	2019–20	Scottish Championship	3	0	1	0	0	0	0	0	4	0
Hamilton Academical	2020–21	Scottish Premiership	33	10	1	0	3	0	—		37	10
Ross County	2021–22	Scottish Premiership	35	4	1	0	2	0	—		38	4
Ross County	2022–23	Scottish Premiership	24	1	1	0	3	0	—		28	1
Ross County	2023–24	Scottish Premiership	0	0	0	0	0	0	—		0	0
Ross County	Total		59	5	2	0	5	0	0	0	66	5
Motherwell	2024–25	Scottish Premiership	1	0	0	0	0	0	0	0	1	0
Arbroath	2025–26	Scottish Championship	7	1	1	0	2	0	2	0	12	1
Career total			282	28	21	0	30	0	13	1	346	29
