= Danny Thomson =

Scottish footballer (born 1991)

Daniel Thomson
Personal information
- Date of birth: 24 February 1991 (age 35)
- Place of birth: Edinburgh, Scotland
- Position: Central midfielder

Youth career
- Heart of Midlothian

Senior career*
Years	Team	Apps	(Gls)
2010–2013	Heart of Midlothian	0	(0)
2011	→ Clyde (loan)	5	(0)
2011–2012	→ Raith Rovers (loan)	12	(0)

International career
2007–2008	Scotland U17	10	(0)
- * Club domestic league appearances and goals

Daniel Thomson (born 24 February 1991) is a Scottish former footballer who last played for Heart of Midlothian, as a midfielder. He has also played for Clyde and Raith Rovers on loan.

== Career ==
=== Hearts ===
A member of the Hearts youth team, Thomson signed a new contract with the club in January 2010. Having yet to make his first team debut for the club, Thomson was loaned to Clyde and Raith Rovers to get first-team experience. On 29 January 2013, he was released by the club, having made no first-team appearances.

=== Clyde ===
Thomson went out on loan to Clyde in February 2011 to gain first-team experience until the end of the season, making his debut on 15 February against Berwick Rangers. In all he made five appearances for Clyde.

=== Raith Rovers ===
At the start of the 2011–12 season Thomson was once again sent out on loan by Hearts, this time to Scottish First Division team Raith Rovers. He made his debut as a substitute against Cowdenbeath in the Challenge Cup on 23 July 2011. The following week, he scored his first goal for the club, against Montrose in the Scottish League Cup. His last game came on 26 December against Ayr United, and on 5 January 2012 his loan expired and he returned to Hearts.

== Career statistics ==
As of 29 January 2012

Club statistics
Club	Season	League		Scottish Cup		League Cup		Other		Total	
Club	Season	App	Goals	App	Goals	App	Goals	App	Goals	App	Goals
Clyde	2010–11 season	5	220	0	0	-1	100	0	0	4	320
Raith Rovers	2011–12 season	12	27	0	0	2	48	2	0	16	75
Total		17	247	0	0	1	148	2	0	21	395

== Personal life ==
He is the younger brother of fellow footballer Jason Thomson.
