= David McGurn =

Scottish footballer (born 1980)

Personal information
- Full name: David Edward McGurn
- Date of birth: 14 September 1980 (age 46)
- Place of birth: Glasgow, Scotland
- Height: 6 ft 1 in (1.85 m)
- Position: Goalkeeper

Team information
- Current team: Dumbarton (Goalkeeper Coach)

Youth career
- Queen's Park
- Hillwood Boys Club
- 2001–2002: Greenock Morton

Senior career*
Years	Team	Apps	(Gls)
2002–2008	Greenock Morton	82	(0)
2008–2016	Raith Rovers	180	(0)
2015–2016	→ Stranraer (loan)	15	(0)
2016–2019	Cowdenbeath	76	(0)
2019–2021	Raith Rovers	11	(0)
2021–2022	Cowdenbeath	0	(0)
2021	→ Falkirk (loan)	0	(0)
- * Club domestic league appearances and goals as of 26 November 2021 (UTC)

David Edward McGurn (born 14 September 1980) is a Scottish footballer who played as a goalkeeper he is currently the goalkeeper coach at Dumbarton. McGurn previously played for Greenock Morton, Raith Rovers, Stranraer, Cowdenbeath and Falkirk.

== Career ==
McGurn was born in Glasgow. He began his senior Greenock Morton career in 2003 when he was signed by John McCormack from Hillwood Boys Club. McGurn had previously played in the youth teams at Queen's Park, under John McCormack. In his first season McGurn was second in line behind first-choice goalkeeper Craig Coyle. He spent all of the 2003–04 season on the substitutes bench.

He was the regular first-choice goalkeeper for Greenock Morton initially when Jim McInally replaced John McCormack as manager, when he also worked as the club's goalkeeping coach until David Wylie returned to the club. When Jim McInally took charge Craig Coyle was out injured and from there McGurn retained his place in the side until Jim McInally signed Paul Mathers.

He was released by Greenock Morton in May 2008 and signed for Scottish Second Division club Raith Rovers a few days later. On 29 April 2015, McGurn sign a new contract to stay at Raith Rovers for the next two years at least.

On 28 August 2015, McGurn agreed a season-long loan with Stranraer.

On 21 June 2016, McGurn signed for Cowdenbeath.

On 4 June 2019, McGurn signed for Raith Rovers, as a player-coach, on a part-time basis.

After working as a coach at Cowdenbeath and Kelty Hearts, McGurn joined Dumbarton in May 2026.

== Outside of football ==
McGurn works as a lecturer at Cardonald College in sports coaching and fitness. He is also a Culture & Sport Glasgow activity coach, Glasgow football section coach and a qualified SFA goalkeeping coach. He is married to wife Alana, with whom he has a daughter.

== Career statistics ==
As of match played 28 October 2017

Appearances and goals by club, season and competition
Club	Season	League			Scottish Cup		League Cup		Other		Total	
Club	Season	Division	Apps	Goals	Apps	Goals	Apps	Goals	Apps	Goals	Apps	Goals
Greenock Morton	2004–05	Scottish Second Division	23	0	1	0	0	0	0	0	24	0
Greenock Morton	2005–06	Scottish Second Division	29	0	2	0	1	0	6 (Note: Four appearances in Scottish Challenge Cup, two in Scottish First Division play-offs)	0	38	0
Greenock Morton	2006–07	Scottish Second Division	14	0	0	0	1	0	2 (Note: Appearance(s) in Scottish Challenge Cup)	0	17	0
Greenock Morton	2007–08	Scottish First Division	16	0	4	0	0	0	1	0	21	0
Greenock Morton	Total		82	0	7	0	2	0	9	0	100	0
Raith Rovers	2008–09	Scottish Second Division	30	0	0	0	2	0	1	0	33	0
Raith Rovers	2009–10	Scottish First Division	35	0	6	0	1	0	1	0	43	0
Raith Rovers	2010–11	Scottish First Division	22	0	0	0	2	0	0	0	24	0
Raith Rovers	2011–12	Scottish First Division	34	0	1	0	2	0	1	0	38	0
Raith Rovers	2012–13	Scottish First Division	27	0	1	0	3	0	2	0	33	0
Raith Rovers	2013–14	Scottish Championship	10	0	0	0	2	0	1	0	13	0
Raith Rovers	2014–15	Scottish Championship	22	0	4	0	0	0	0	0	26	0
Raith Rovers	Total		180	0	12	0	12	0	6	0	210	0
Stranraer (loan)	2015–16	Scottish League One	15	0	1	0	0	0	0	0	16	0
Cowdenbeath	2016–17	Scottish League Two	21	0	1	0	4	0	1	0	27	0
Cowdenbeath	2017–18	Scottish League Two	2	0	1	0	2	0	0	0	5	0
Cowdenbeath	Total		23	0	2	0	6	0	1	0	32	0
Career total			300	0	22	0	20	0	16	0	358	0

== Honours ==
Greenock Morton

- Scottish Second Division: 2006–07

Raith Rovers

- Scottish Second Division: 2008–09
