= David Smith (footballer, born 1993) =

Scottish footballer

Personal information
- Date of birth: 1 March 1993 (age 33)
- Place of birth: Glasgow, Scotland
- Position: Right back

Team information
- Current team: Syngenta Juniors

Youth career
- 2003–2011: Heart of Midlothian

Senior career*
Years	Team	Apps	(Gls)
2011–2014	Heart of Midlothian	36	(1)
2011–2012	→ Raith Rovers (loan)	8	(1)
2012–2013	→ Raith Rovers (loan)	19	(1)
2014–2016	Falkirk	41	(2)
2016–2018	Dumbarton	53	(1)
2018–2020	Stranraer	38	(1)
2020-	Syngenta		

International career^{‡}
2008	Scotland U16	5	(2)
2009	Scotland U17	7	(1)
2011	Scotland U19	2	(1)
2012–2013	Scotland U21	4	(0)
- * Club domestic league appearances and goals as of 13:58 3 November 2020 (UTC) ‡ National team caps and goals as of 23 December 2011 (UTC)

David Smith (born 1 March 1993) is a Scottish footballer who plays as a right-back or winger for Scottish junior side Syngenta Juniors. Smith has previously played for Heart of Midlothian, Falkirk and Dumbarton, as well as having had two loan spells with Raith Rovers.

== Club career ==
=== Hearts ===
Smith attended Abronhill High School in Cumbernauld and joined the Hearts youth setup aged 10. A member of Hearts under 19 team Smith made his first team debut as a substitute against Dundee United on 15 May 2011. His performance for the under 19 squad in the early part of the 2011–12 season earned him a new three-year contract extending his stay with the club until 2014.

With Hearts in financial difficulty and wanting to bring through members of their under-19 squad into the first team, Smith was sent on loan to Raith Rovers to gain first team experience.

The 2013–14 season would be darkest time for Smith, as Hearts entered administration and were deducted 15 points ahead of the new season. On 2 January 2014, Smith scored his only goal for Hearts, in a 2–1 loss against Hibernian. During a semi-final match against Inverness CT, Smith fractured his knee in the first half and have to be substituted. After a scan, it announced that Smith would be out for six weeks. Smith would make his return, in a 2–1 loss against Dundee United on 21 March 2014. However, Smith was unable to help the club survive relegation. At the end of the season, Smith signed a contract extension with the club, keeping until 2015.

During his final month at Hearts, Smith lost his first team opportunities following new arrivals and was told he could leave Hearts.

==== Raith Rovers ====
On 21 November 2011, Smith joined Scottish First Division side Raith Rovers on a month's loan deal. Making his debut on 26 November 2011 scoring their second goal in a 3–2 win against Hamilton. After six appearances on 4 January 2012, his loan was extended for another month. He returned to Hearts on 30 January 2012. On 31 August 2012, he returned to the club on loan.

=== Falkirk ===
On 1 September 2014, Smith moved to Falkirk, signing a two-year contract. He made his debut on 13 September 2014, as Falkirk drew 1–1 with Queen of the South. Smith then scored his first goal and provided two assists, in a 6–0 win over Cowdenbeath on 25 October 2014.

=== Dumbarton ===
After leaving Falkirk, Smith signed for Scottish Championship rivals Dumbarton in June 2016. He scored his first goal for the club in a 3–3 draw with Peterhead in July 2016. After being an ever present for the club, playing in all 43 games of the season, Smith agreed to a new 1-year deal in May 2017 Smith was released by the club in May 2018.

=== Stranraer ===
Smith signed for Stranraer on 22 May 2018.

=== Syngenta ===
David then signed for Grangemouth-based Syngenta on 29 May 2020.

== International career ==
Smith has represented Scotland at under-16, under-17, under-19 and under-21 level.

== Career statistics ==
As of 13:58, 3 November 2020 (UTC)

Club statistics
Club	Season	League		Scottish Cup		League Cup		Other		Total	
Club	Season	App	Goals	App	Goals	App	Goals	App	Goals	App	Goals
Hearts	2010–11 season	1	0	0	0	0	0	0	0	1	0
Hearts	2011–12 season	0	0	0	0	0	0	0	0	0	0
Hearts	2012–13 season	3	0	0	0	0	0	0	0	3	0
Hearts	2013–14 season	32	1	1	0	2	0	0	0	35	1
Hearts	2014–15 season	0	0	0	0	1	0	1	0	2	0
Hearts	Total	36	1	1	0	3	0	1	0	41	1
Raith Rovers	2011–12 season	8	1	0	0	0	0	0	0	8	1
Raith Rovers	2012–13 season	19	1	1	0	0	0	1	0	21	1
Raith Rovers	Total	27	2	1	0	0	0	1	0	29	2
Falkirk	2014–15 season	26	2	5	1	0	0	0	0	31	3
Falkirk	2015–16 season	15	0	2	0	3	0	2	1	20	1
Falkirk	Total	41	2	7	1	3	0	2	1	53	4
Dumbarton	2016–17 season	36	0	2	0	4	1	1	0	43	1
Dumbarton	2017–18 season	17	1	2	0	4	0	6	0	29	1
Dumbarton	Total	53	1	4	0	8	1	7	0	72	2
Stranraer	2018–19 Season	33	1	2	0	4	0	1	0	40	1
Stranraer	2019–20 Season	5	0	3	0	0	0	1	0	9	0
Career Total		195	7	18	1	18	1	13	1	244	10
