= Dougie Hill =

Scottish footballer (born 1985)

Personal information
- Date of birth: 16 January 1985 (age 41)
- Place of birth: Edinburgh, Scotland
- Position: Defender

Team information
- Current team: Cowdenbeath (manager)

Youth career
- Falkirk

Senior career*
Years	Team	Apps	(Gls)
2004–2005	Alloa Athletic	15	(2)
2005–2008	Cowdenbeath	79	(3)
2008–2009	Alloa Athletic	32	(0)
2009–2015	Raith Rovers	132	(6)
2011	→ Brechin City (loan)	4	(1)
2015–2016	Alloa Athletic	29	(1)
2016–2017	Brechin City	32	(3)
2017–2018	Dumbarton	20	(0)
2018–2020	Brechin City	54	(4)
2020–2023	Kelty Hearts	11	(1)
2023	Cowdenbeath	10	(1)
2024	Berwick Rangers	8	(0)

Managerial career
- 2024–: Cowdenbeath
- * Club domestic league appearances and goals

Douglas Hill (born 16 January 1985) is a Scottish retired footballer who played as a defender. He is currently the manager of Lowland League side Cowdenbeath.

At the start of the 2022/2023 season Hill took on the role as assistant manager while playing when required at Kelty Hearts now has now been named manager at Cowdenbeath FC.

He has previously played for Alloa Athletic, twice with Cowdenbeath twice, Raith Rovers, Dumbarton, Brechin City, Kelty Hearts and Berwick Rangers.

== Career ==
Hill started his career in the youth side of Falkirk and in July 2004, signed for Alloa Athletic After one season at Alloa, Hill signed for Cowdenbeath in July 2005. On 17 June 2008, Hill signed for Alloa Athletic for a second time. On 17 July 2009, Hill signed for Raith Rovers. He made his debut on 8 August 2009, as a substitute against Queen of The South in the Scottish First Division. He went on to score his first goal and the winning goal for the club in their game against Ross County on 22 August 2009. In all he made 33 appearances scoring two goals that season.

At the start of the 2010–11 season, Hill suffered a broken ankle in the Reserve League Cup Final against Dunfermline Athletic. On his return from injury, in order to regain full fitness, he went out on loan to Brechin City. He made his debut on 29 January 2011, in a 2–1 win against Dumbarton scoring the opening goal. In all he made five appearances for Brechin but unfortunately was sent off in his last game for the club. On his return to Raith Rovers, Hill broke back into the first team making a further eight appearances for them.

On 6 April 2014, Hill was named man of the match in a 1–0 win against Rangers in the 2014 Scottish Challenge Cup Final. In June 2015, after six-years with the Kirkcaldy side, Hill was released by Raith Rovers. On 22 June 2015, Hill signed for a third spell with Scottish Championship club Alloa Athletic. After one season at Recreation Park, Hill moved to Scottish League One side Brechin City in June 2016, who he previously had a short spell on loan with in 2011. After achieving promotion to the Scottish Championship, Hill was one of a number of players who were released by Brechin.

Following a successful trial, Hill joined Scottish Championship side Dumbarton on a one-year deal in July 2017. He scored his first goal for the club in a Playoff semi-final victory against Arbroath in May 2018. He left Dumbarton in May 2018, following the expiration of his contract, and rejoined Brechin City.

Hill signed with Kelty Hearts on 10 September 2020.

== Career statistics ==
As of 14:49, 24 April 2019 (UTC)

Club	Season	League		Scottish Cup		League Cup		Other		Total	
Club	Season	Apps	Goals	Apps	Goals	Apps	Goals	Apps	Goals	Apps	Goals
Alloa Athletic	2004–05	15	2	1	0	2	0	2	0	20	2
Cowdenbeath	2005–06	24	1	1	0	1	0	1	0	27	1
Cowdenbeath	2006–07	28	1	4	1	0	0	0	0	32	2
Cowdenbeath	2007–08	27	1	2	0	2	0	3	0	34	1
Cowdenbeath	Total	79	3	7	1	3	0	4	0	93	4
Alloa Athletic	2008–09	32	0	3	0	2	0	2	0	39	0
Raith Rovers	2009–10	29	2	7	0	1	0	0	0	37	2
Raith Rovers	2010–11	8	0	0	0	1	0	0	0	9	0
Raith Rovers	2011–12	29	0	0	0	1	0	0	0	30	0
Raith Rovers	2012–13	25	1	3	1	3	2	2	1	33	5
Raith Rovers	2013–14	30	3	3	1	2	0	4	1	39	5
Raith Rovers	2014–15	11	0	1	0	0	0	0	0	12	0
Raith Rovers	Total	132	6	14	2	8	2	6	2	160	12
Brechin City (loan)	2010–11	4	1	1	0	0	0	0	0	5	1
Alloa Athletic	2015–16	29	1	1	0	1	0	2	0	33	1
Brechin City	2016–17	32	3	1	0	4	0	2	0	39	3
Dumbarton	2017–18	20	0	2	0	2	0	5	1	29	1
Brechin City	2018–19	28	3	1	0	4	0	0	0	32	3
Total		370	18	30	3	26	2	23	3	449	27

== Honours ==
=== Club ===
Raith Rovers

- Scottish Challenge Cup: 2013–14
