= 2021–22 Ross County F.C. season =

Ross County
2021–22 season
- Chairman: Roy MacGregor
- Manager: Malky Mackay
- Ground: Victoria Park; Dingwall, Ross-shire (Capacity: 6,541)
- Scottish Premiership: 6th
- Scottish Cup: Fourth round
- Scottish League Cup: Group stage
- Top goalscorer: League: Charles-Cook (13 goals); All: Charles-Cook (13 goals)
- Highest home attendance: 6,698 vs Rangers (league)
- Lowest home attendance: 1,990 vs St Johnstone (league)
Home colours	Away colours

The 2021–22 season is Ross County's third consecutive season in the Scottish Premiership and the club's 9th season overall in the top flight of Scottish football. Ross County will also compete in the Scottish Cup and Scottish League Cup. Malky Mackay was appointed as the club's manager on 26 May 2021.

== Results and fixtures ==
Win Draw Loss Postponed

=== Pre-season ===
3 July 2021 Friendly	Elgin City	0–5	Ross County	Elgin
			White 2', 52'; Callachan 49'; Samuel 84'; Wright 86'	Stadium: Borough Briggs

=== Scottish Premiership ===
31 July 2021 1	Ross County	0–0	St Johnstone	Dingwall
15:00			McCann (penalty missed) 70'	Stadium: Victoria Park; Attendance: 1,990; Referee: Colin Steven

8 August 2021 2	Hibernian	3–0	Ross County	Edinburgh
15:00	Boyle 22'; Magennis 26'; Doidge 33'			Stadium: Easter Road; Attendance: 5,600; Referee: Grant Irvine

21 August 2021 3	Ross County	2–4	Rangers	Dingwall
15:00	Clarke 40'; White 77' (pen.)		Aribo 15'; Goldson 19'; Morelos 56'; Arfield 84'	Stadium: Victoria Park; Attendance: 6,450; Referee: David Munro

29 August 2021 4	Aberdeen	1–1	Ross County	Aberdeen
15:00	Ramirez 88'		Charles-Cook 33'	Stadium: Pittodrie; Attendance: 14,434; Referee: Nick Walsh

11 September 2021 5	Celtic	3–0	Ross County	Glasgow
15:00	Carter-Vickers 64'; Ajeti 70', 85'			Stadium: Celtic Park; Attendance: 56,511; Referee: Don Robertson

18 September 2021 6	Ross County	2–2	Heart of Midlothian	Dingwall
15:00	Spittal 10', 45'		Boyce 9'; Kingsley 66'	Stadium: Victoria Park; Attendance: 3,802; Referee: David Dickinson

25 September 2021 7	Motherwell	2–1	Ross County	Motherwell
15:00	Slattery 2'; Watt 80'		Charles-Cook 39'	Stadium: Fir Park; Attendance: 4,477; Referee: Craig Napier

2 October 2021 8	Dundee United	1–0	Ross County	Dundee
15:00	Niskanen 31'			Stadium: Tannadice Park; Attendance: 6,548; Referee: Don Robertson

16 October 2021 9	Ross County	2–3	St Mirren	Dingwall
15:00	Spittal 37'; Iacovitti 66'		Brophy 15'; Fraser 34'; Tanser 38'	Stadium: Victoria Park; Attendance: 3,882; Referee: Colin Steven

23 October 2021 10	Ross County	2–3	Livingston	Dingwall
15:00	Clarke 7'; White (penalty missed) 24'; Callachan 67' (pen.)		Anderson 31'; Bailey 43'; Parkes 90+5'	Stadium: Victoria Park; Attendance: 2,566; Referee: Euan Anderson

27 October 2021 11	Dundee	0–5	Ross County	Dundee
19:45			Clarke 18'; Callachan 27'; Hungbo 34'; Charles-Cook 40', 71'	Stadium: Dens Park; Attendance: 4,883; Referee: David Dickinson

7 November 2021 12	Rangers	4–2	Ross County	Glasgow
15:00	Aribo 19'; Kent 30'; Bacuna 49'; Iacovitti 60' (o.g.)		Hungbo 6'; White 87'	Stadium: Ibrox Stadium; Attendance: 49,222; Referee: David Munro

24 November 2021 13	Ross County	1–0	Hibernian	Dingwall
19:45	Spittal 72'			Stadium: Victoria Park; Attendance: 3,316; Referee: Gavin Duncan

27 November 2021 14	Ross County	1–1	Dundee United	Dingwall
15:00	Baldwin 90+3'		Appere 49'	Stadium: Victoria Park; Attendance: 3,214; Referee: Greg Aitken

1 December 2021 15	St Mirren	0–0	Ross County	Paisley
19:45				Stadium: St Mirren Park; Attendance: 3,806; Referee: David Dickinson

11 December 2021 16	Ross County	3–2	Dundee	Dingwall
15:00	D. Samuel 23'; Mullen 64' (o.g.); Charles-Cook 78'	Report	McCowan 15', 38'	Stadium: Victoria Park; Attendance: 3,122; Referee: Bobby Madden

15 December 2021 17	Ross County	1–2	Celtic	Dingwall
19:45	Baldwin 57'		Abada 21'; Ralston 90+7'	Stadium: Victoria Park; Attendance: 5,592; Referee: Alan Muir

18 December 2021 18	Livingston	1–1	Ross County	Livingston
15:00	Obileye 89'		Cancola 45+1'	Stadium: Almondvale Stadium; Attendance: 2,554; Referee: Grant Irvine

22 December 2021 19	St Johnstone	1–2	Ross County	Perth
19:45	Butterfield 19'		Charles-Cook 15'; Callachan (penalty missed) 29' 69'	Stadium: McDiarmid Park; Attendance: 2,249; Referee: William Collum

26 December 2021 20	Heart of Midlothian	2–1	Ross County	Edinburgh
15:00	Smith 4'; Woodburn 42'		White 72'	Stadium: Tynecastle Park; Attendance: 0 Referee: David Munro

18 January 2022 21	Ross County	3–1	Motherwell	Dingwall
19:45	Solholm Johansen 57' (o.g.); Charles-Cook 72', 79' (pen.)		Roberts 55'	Stadium: Victoria Park; Attendance: 2,523; Referee: John Beaton

26 January 2022 22	Dundee United	2–1	Ross County	Dundee
19:45	Clark 74' (pen.), 90+1'		Charles-Cook 52'	Stadium: Tannadice Park; Attendance: 4,519; Referee: David Munro

29 January 2022 23	Ross County	3–3	Rangers	Dingwall
12:30	White 25'; Charles-Cook 29'; Wright 90+6'		Diallo 5'; Tavernier 49'; Goldson 72'	Stadium: Victoria Park; Attendance: 6,401; Referee: Nick Walsh

1 February 2022 24	Ross County	1–1	Aberdeen	Dingwall
19:45	Callachan 53'		Hayes 48'	Stadium: Victoria Park; Attendance: 3,343; Referee: Alan Muir

5 February 2022 25	Dundee	1–2	Ross County	Dundee
15:00	Rudden 24' (red card)		Hungbo 45+1'; Charles-Cook (penalty missed) 59' 80'	Stadium: Dens Park; Attendance: 4,621; Referee: Don Robertson

9 February 2022 26	Ross County	1–1	Livingston	Dingwall
19:45	Ramsey 90+3'		Forrest 50'; Obileye (penalty missed)	Stadium: Victoria Park; Attendance: 2,224; Referee: David Munro

19 February 2022 27	Hibernian	2–0	Ross County	Edinburgh
15:00	Doyle-Hayes 50', 78'			Stadium: Easter Road; Attendance: 14,149; Referee: Steven McLean

26 February 2022 28	Ross County	3–1	St Johnstone	Dingwall
15:00	Charles-Cook 35', 53'; Hungbo 66'		Hendry 24'	Stadium: Victoria Park; Attendance: 3,161; Referee: Nick Walsh

2 March 2022 29	Motherwell	0–1	Ross County	Motherwell
19:45			Hungbo 15' (pen.)	Stadium: Fir Park; Attendance: 3,587; Referee: John Beaton

5 March 2022 30	Ross County	1–0	St Mirren	Dingwall
15:00	Hungbo 49' (pen.)			Stadium: Victoria Park; Attendance: 3,229; Referee: David Dickinson

19 March 2022 31	Celtic	4–0	Ross County	Glasgow
15:00	Giakoumakis 11', 18', 61' (pen.); Maeda 26'			Stadium: Celtic Park; Attendance: 58,432; Referee: Don Robertson

2 April 2022 32	Ross County	1–1	Heart of Midlothian	Dingwall
15:00	Iacovitti 31'		McKay (penalty missed) 17' 39'	Stadium: Victoria Park; Attendance: 5,210; Referee: Gavin Duncan

9 April 2022 33	Aberdeen	0–1	Ross County	Aberdeen
15:00			Hungbo 86' (pen.)	Stadium: Pittodrie; Attendance: 15,162; Referee: Greg Aitken

24 April 2022 34	Ross County	0–2	Celtic	Dingwall
14:30			Furuhashi 12'; Jota 87'	Stadium: Victoria Park; Attendance: 6,698; Referee: Kevin Clancy

30 April 2022 35	Heart of Midlothian	0–0	Ross County	Edinburgh
15:00				Stadium: Tynecastle Park; Attendance: 16,699; Referee: Steven McLean

7 May 2022 36	Ross County	0–1	Motherwell	Dingwall
15:00			van Veen 68' (pen.)	Stadium: Victoria Park; Attendance: 3,067; Referee: David Munro

11 May 2022 37	Rangers	4–1	Ross County	Glasgow
19:45	Wright 13'; Tavernier 29' (pen.); Sakala 82'; Diallo 90'		White 72'	Stadium: Ibrox Stadium; Attendance: 48,474; Referee: Andrew Dallas

14 May 2022 38	Ross County	1–2	Dundee United	Dingwall
12:15	Spittal 65'		Clark 70' (pen.), 89'	Stadium: Victoria Park; Attendance: 5,165; Referee: Nick Walsh

=== Scottish League Cup ===
Ross County's first two group stage matches were forfeited due to a COVID-19 outbreak in their squad leaving them unable to field a team.

==== Group stage ====
10 July 2021	Forfar Athletic	3–0	Ross County	Forfar
15:00				Stadium: Station Park

18 July 2021	Ross County	0–3	Dundee	Dingwall
15:00				Stadium: Global Energy Stadium

21 July 2021	Brora Rangers	0–1	Ross County	Brora
19:45			Iacovitti 53'	Stadium: Dudgeon Park; Referee: Euan Anderson

24 July 2021	Ross County	4–1	Montrose	Dingwall
15:00	Spittal 6', 56'; Iacovitti 35'; White 53'		Johnston 61'	Stadium: Global Energy Stadium; Referee: Craig Napier

=== Scottish Cup ===
22 January 2022 Fourth round	Livingston	1–0	Ross County	Livingston
15:00	Obileye 16' (pen.)			Stadium: Almondvale Stadium; Attendance: 1,227; Referee: Bobby Madden

== Squad statistics ==
=== Captains ===
No.	Pos	Nat	Name	No of games	Notes
5	DF	(England)	Jack Baldwin	19	
15	DF	(Scotland)	Keith Watson	15	Club Captain
7	MF	(Scotland)	Blair Spittal	7	

=== Appearances ===
As of 14 May 2022

No.	Pos	Nat	Player	Total		Premiership		Scottish Cup		League Cup	
No.	Pos	Nat	Player	Apps	Goals	Apps	Goals	Apps	Goals	Apps	Goals
1	GK	(Scotland) SCO	Ross Laidlaw	23	0	20	0	1	0	2	0
2	DF	(England) ENG	Connor Randall	32	0	27+2	0	1	0	1+1	0
3	DF	(England) ENG	Jake Vokins	23	0	19+1	0	1	0	2	0
4	MF	(Austria) AUT	David Cancola	18	1	12+6	1	0	0	0	0
5	DF	(England) ENG	Jack Baldwin	30	2	27+3	2	0	0	0	0
6	MF	(Canada) CAN	Harry Paton	32	0	23+8	0	0+1	0	0	0
7	MF	(Scotland) SCO	Blair Spittal	37	7	27+7	5	1	0	2	2
8	MF	(Scotland) SCO	Ross Callachan	38	4	33+2	4	1	0	2	0
9	FW	(Wales) WAL	Alex Samuel	6	0	3+2	0	1	0	0	0
10	FW	(England) ENG	Dominic Samuel	31	1	9+19	1	1	0	2	0
11	MF	(England) ENG	Josh Sims	1	0	0+1	0	0	0	0	0
15	DF	(Scotland) SCO	Keith Watson	26	0	13+11	0	0	0	2	0
16	DF	(Scotland) SCO	Alex Iacovitti	33	4	31	2	0	0	2	2
17	MF	(Grenada) GRN	Regan Charles-Cook	37	13	36+1	13	0	0	0	0
18	MF	(Scotland) SCO	Jack Burroughs	18	0	7+10	0	1	0	0	0
19	DF	(England) ENG	Kayne Ramsay	9	1	5+3	1	1	0	0	0
20	DF	(England) ENG	Declan Drysdale	6	0	3+2	0	1	0	0	0
21	GK	(Scotland) SCO	Ross Munro	1	0	1	0	0	0	0	0
22	MF	(England) ENG	Jordan Tillson	34	0	29+3	0	0	0	2	0
23	FW	(England) ENG	Joseph Hungbo	33	7	21+12	7	0	0	0	0
25	MF	(Canada) CAN	Ben Paton	11	0	6+4	0	1	0	0	0
26	FW	(Scotland) SCO	Jordan White	41	6	31+7	5	0+1	0	1+1	1
30	FW	(Scotland) SCO	Matthew Wright	5	1	0+4	1	0	0	0+1	0
31	GK	(Australia) AUS	Ashley Maynard-Brewer	17	0	17	0	0	0	0	0
32	MF	(Scotland) SCO	Adam Mackinnon	3	0	1+2	0	0	0	0	0
33	DF	(Scotland) SCO	Ben Williamson	1	0	0	0	0	0	0+1	0
34	MF	(Scotland) SCO	Ryan MacLeman	1	0	0	0	0	0	0+1	0
Players who left the club during the season
9	FW	(Scotland) SCO	Oli Shaw	3	0	0+1	0	0	0	1+1	0
11	MF	(England) ENG	Alexander Robertson	5	0	0+3	0	0	0	1+1	0
12	DF	(England) ENG	Tom Grivosti	0	0	0	0	0	0	0	0
20	DF	(England) ENG	Harry Clarke	17	3	15+2	3	0	0	0	0
25	DF	(Scotland) SCO	Coll Donaldson	4	0	2	0	0	0	2	0

=== Goalscorers ===
Rank	No.	Nat.	Po.	Name	Premiership	Scottish Cup	League Cup	Total
1	17	(Grenada)	MF	Regan Charles-Cook	13	0	0	13
2	23	(England)	MF	Joseph Hungbo	7	0	0	7
2	7	(Scotland)	MF	Blair Spittal	5	0	2	7
4	26	(Scotland)	FW	Jordan White	5	0	1	6
5	8	(Scotland)	MF	Ross Callachan	4	0	0	4
5	16	(Scotland)	DF	Alex Iacovitti	2	0	2	4
6	20	(England)	DF	Harry Clarke	3	0	0	3
8	5	(England)	DF	Jack Baldwin	2	0	0	2
9	10	(England)	FW	Dominic Samuel	1	0	0	1
9	30	(Scotland)	FW	Matthew Wright	1	0	0	1
9	4	(Austria)	MF	David Cancola	1	0	0	1
9	19	(England)	DF	Kayne Ramsay	1	0	0	1
Own goals					2	0	0	2
Total					47	0	5	52
As of 14 May 2022

== Team statistics ==
=== League table ===
Pos	Team	Pld	W	D	L	GF	GA	GD	Pts	Qualification or relegation (Note: Teams play each other three times (33 matches), before the league is split into two groups (the top six and the bottom six).)
4	Dundee United	38	12	12	14	37	44	−7	48	Qualification for the Europa Conference League third qualifying round
5	Motherwell	38	12	10	16	42	61	−19	46	Qualification for the Europa Conference League second qualifying round
6	Ross County	38	10	11	17	47	61	−14	41	
7	Livingston	38	13	10	15	41	46	−5	49	
8	Hibernian	38	11	12	15	38	42	−4	45	

Rules for classification: 1) Points; 2) Goal difference; 3) Goals scored; 4) Head-to-head points; 5) Head-to-Head goal difference; 6) Play-off (only if deciding champion, UEFA competitions qualification, second stage group allocation or relegation).

=== League cup table ===
Pos	Team	Pld	W	PW	PL	L	GF	GA	GD	Pts	Qualification	DUN	FOR	ROS	MON	BRO
1	Dundee	4	4	0	0	0	14	2	+12	12	Qualification for the second round	—	5–2	—	—	4–0
2	Forfar Athletic	4	2	1	0	1	6	5	+1	8		—	—	3–0 (Note: Forfar Athletic were awarded a technical 3−0 win over Ross County, who were unable to raise a team after a COVID-19 outbreak among players and staff.)	p0–0	—
3	Ross County	4	2	0	0	2	5	7	−2	6		0–3 (Note: Dundee were awarded a technical 3−0 win over Ross County, who were unable to raise a team after a COVID-19 outbreak among players and staff.)	—	—	4–1	—
4	Montrose	4	1	0	1	2	4	6	−2	4		0–2	—	—	—	3–0
5	Brora Rangers	4	0	0	0	4	0	9	−9	0		—	0–1	0–1	—	—

Rules for classification: 1) goal difference, 2) goals scored, 3) away goals scored, 4) matches won, 5) away matches won, 6) drawing of lots.

== Transfers ==
=== In ===
Date	Player	From	Fee
3 June 2021	(Scotland) Ross Callachan	(Scotland) Hamilton Academical	Free
29 June 2021	(England) Dominic Samuel	(England) Gillingham	Free
2 July 2021	(England) Jake Vokins	(England) Southampton	Loan
5 July 2021	(England) Alexander Robertson	(England) Manchester City	Loan
22 July 2021	(Austria) David Cancola	(Czech Republic) Slovan Liberec	Free
2 August 2021	(England) Harry Clarke	(England) Arsenal	Loan
6 August 2021	(Australia) Ashley Maynard-Brewer	(England) Charlton Athletic	Loan
6 August 2021	(Scotland) Jack Burroughs	(England) Coventry City	Loan
6 August 2021	(Canada) Ben Paton	(England) Blackburn Rovers	Free
17 August 2021	(England) Joseph Hungbo	(England) Watford	Loan
25 August 2021	(England) Jack Baldwin	(England) Bristol Rovers	Free
31 August 2021	(Wales) Alex Samuel	(England) Wycombe Wanderers	Free
11 January 2022	(England) Declan Drysdale	(England) Coventry City	Loan
14 January 2022	(England) Kayne Ramsay	(England) Southampton	Loan
14 February 2022	(England) Josh Sims	(England) Southampton	Free

=== Out ===
Date	Player	To	Fee
27 May 2021	(England) Carl Tremarco	Retired	Free
27 May 2021	(France) Mohamed Maouche		Free
16 June 2021	(Northern Ireland) Billy McKay	(Scotland) Inverness Caledonian Thistle	Free
17 June 2021	(Scotland) Michael Gardyne	(Scotland) Inverness Caledonian Thistle	Free
17 June 2021	(Scotland) Jason Naismith	(Scotland) Kilmarnock	Free
23 June 2021	(England) Ross Draper	(Scotland) Cove Rangers	Free
23 June 2021	(Scotland) Iain Vigurs	(Scotland) Cove Rangers	Free
26 June 2021	(England) Jermaine Hylton	(Wales) Newport County	Free
19 July 2021	(Northern Ireland) Callum Morris	(England) Morpeth Town	Free
11 August 2021	(Scotland) Matthew Wright	(Scotland) Brora Rangers	Loan
11 August 2021	(Scotland) Ben Williamson	(Scotland) Nairn County	Loan
11 August 2021	(Scotland) Logan Ross	(Scotland) Lossiemouth	Loan
31 August 2021	(Scotland) Oli Shaw	(Scotland) Kilmarnock	Undisclosed
1 September 2021	(England) Tom Grivosti	(Scotland) Elgin City	Loan
3 January 2022	(Scotland) Coll Donaldson	(Scotland) Dunfermline Athletic	Loan
20 January 2022	(England) Tom Grivosti	(Republic of Ireland) St Patrick's Athletic	Undisclosed
2 February 2022	(France) Tony Andreu	(Andorra) UE Sant Julià	Free
