= Andy Walls =

Scottish footballer

Personal information
- Date of birth: 2 September 1993 (age 33)
- Place of birth: Dundee, Scotland
- Positions: Midfielder; forward

Team information
- Current team: Raith Rovers

Youth career
- Raith Rovers

Senior career*
Years	Team	Apps	(Gls)
2010–2012	Raith Rovers	0	(0)
- * Club domestic league appearances and goals as of 04:40, 4 June 2012 (UTC)

Andrew Walls (born 2 September 1993) is a Scottish former footballer who played for Raith Rovers in the Scottish First Division.

== Career ==
Walls earned a full-time contract with Raith Rovers in June 2010 after progressing through the youth sides. In September 2011 he was part of a Raith side who won the SFL Reserve League Cup defeating Livingston 2–1 in the final.

He made his senior debut on 30 July 2011 as a substitute in a 4–1 victory against Montrose in a Scottish League Cup fixture replacing teammate Brian Graham. Walls was released by Raith in May 2012.

== Career statistics ==
As of 4 June 2012.

Club	Season	League		Cup		League Cup		Other^{[a]}		Total	
Club	Season	Apps	Goals	Apps	Goals	Apps	Goals	Apps	Goals	Apps	Goals
Raith Rovers	2010-12	0	0	0	0	1	0	0	0	1	0
Lochee United JFC	2012-13										
Dundee East Craigie JFC	2013-16										
Forfar West End JFC	2016-20										
Broughty Athletic JFC	2020										
Downfield Spiders JFC	2020-21										
Kirrie Thistle JFC	2021-22										
Tayport FC	2022-23										
Forfar West End JFC	2023-										
Career total		0	0	0	0	1	0	0	0	1	0

a. Includes other competitive competitions, including the Scottish Challenge Cup.
