= Willie Dyer =

Scottish footballer

Personal information
- Full name: William Dyer
- Date of birth: 25 February 1987 (age 39)
- Place of birth: Glasgow, Scotland
- Position: Left back

Team information
- Current team: Drumchapel United

Youth career
- St Johnstone

Senior career*
Years	Team	Apps	(Gls)
2004–2008	St Johnstone	12	(0)
2007	→ Brechin City (loan)	9	(0)
2008–2010	Brechin City	76	(2)
2010–2012	Raith Rovers	64	(1)
2012–2013	Greenock Morton	24	(0)
2013–2015	Dundee	42	(0)
2015–2018	Brechin City	88	(1)
2018–2019	Dumbarton	14	(0)
2019–2020	East Stirlingshire	7	(0)
2020–2023	Drumchapel United	??	(??)

Managerial career
- 2025-: Arthurlie
- * Club domestic league appearances and goals as of 00:00, 7 May 2020 (UTC)

William Dyer (born 25 February 1987 in Glasgow) is a Scottish former professional footballer who is currently the First Team Manager of Arthurlie F.C.

As a footballer he played for St Johnstone, Brechin City, Raith Rovers, Greenock Morton, Dundee, Dumbarton East Stirlingshire, and Drumchapel United F.C.

== Career ==
Dyer began his career at St Johnstone, progressing through the club's youth ranks.

In September 2007, he went on loan to Brechin City. He returned to Saints in December after making nine appearances for Brechin. He made a permanent move to Brechin in January 2008.

On 20 May 2010, he was confirmed as a new signing for Raith Rovers on a two-year full-time deal.

Dyer signed for Greenock Morton in May 2012, under freedom of contract. His contract expired in May 2013.

On 5 June 2013, Dyer signed for Dundee along with fellow former Morton player Peter MacDonald. Dyer made his debut for the club in the first round of the Scottish Challenge Cup, in a 1–0 win over Alloa Athletic, where he came on for Kevin McBride in the 79th minute. He soon made his league debut in a 0–0 draw against Raith Rovers. After making twenty-four appearances in all competitions, as Dundee won the Scottish Championship and promotion to the Scottish Premiership, Dyer signed a two-year contract extension. He left Dundee at the end of the 2014–15 season, having not been offered a new contract.

After his release by Dundee, Dyer re-signed with Brechin City for the third time. After three seasons at Glebe Park, Dyer signed a one-year deal with Dumbarton in May 2018 however was released from the club in May 2019 after making just 21 appearances - and not featuring after the start of January, joining Lowland League East Stirlingshire a month later.

Dyer signed for his local club Drumchapel United at the end of April 2020.

After finishing his playing he moved into coaching, becoming First Team Manager of West of Scotland Premier Division side Arthurlie F.C.

== Career statistics ==
As of 18:28, 5 January 2019 (UTC)

Appearances and goals by club, season and competition
Club	Season	League			Scottish Cup		League Cup		Other		Total	
Club	Season	Division	Apps	Goals	Apps	Goals	Apps	Goals	Apps	Goals	Apps	Goals
St Johnstone	2004–05	First Division	7	0	0	0	0	0	0	0	7	0
St Johnstone	2005–06	First Division	3	0	0	0	0	0	0	0	3	0
St Johnstone	2006–07	First Division	1	0	2	0	1	0	3 (Note: Appearances in the Scottish Challenge Cup)	0	7	0
St Johnstone	2007–08	First Division	1	0	0	0	0	0	2	0	3	0
St Johnstone	Total		12	0	2	0	1	0	5	0	20	0
Brechin City (loan)	2007–08	Second Division	9	0	0	0	0	0	0	0	9	0
Brechin City	2007–08	Second Division	16	1	1	0	0	0	0	0	17	1
Brechin City	2008–09	Second Division	35	1	2	0	2	0	3	0	42	1
Brechin City	2009–10	Second Division	25	0	3	0	2	0	0	0	30	0
Brechin City	Total		85	2	6	0	4	0	3	0	98	2
Raith Rovers	2010–11	First Division	30	1	1	0	3	0	1	0	35	1
Raith Rovers	2011–12	First Division	34	0	0	0	2	0	2	0	38	0
Raith Rovers	Total		64	1	1	0	5	0	3	0	73	1
Greenock Morton	2012–13	First Division	24	0	5	0	1	0	1	0	31	0
Dundee	2013–14	Championship	21	0	0	0	2	0	3	0	26	0
Dundee	2014–15	Premiership	21	0	2	0	1	0	0	0	24	0
Dundee	Total		42	0	2	0	3	0	3	0	50	0
Brechin City	2015–16	League One	31	0	1	0	0	0	0	0	32	0
Brechin City	2016–17	League One	28	1	1	0	3	1	6 (Note: Two appearances in the Scottish Challenge Cup and four in the Championship play-offs)	0	38	2
Brechin City	2017–18	Championship	29	0	1	0	4	0	1	0	35	0
Brechin City	Total		88	1	3	0	7	1	7	0	105	2
Dumbarton	2018–19	League One	14	0	1	0	4	0	2	0	21	0
Career total			329	4	20	0	25	1	24	0	398	5

== Honours ==
Dundee

- Scottish Championship: 2013–14

== See also ==
2012–13 Greenock Morton F.C. season
