= Brian Graham (footballer) =

Scottish footballer (born 1987)

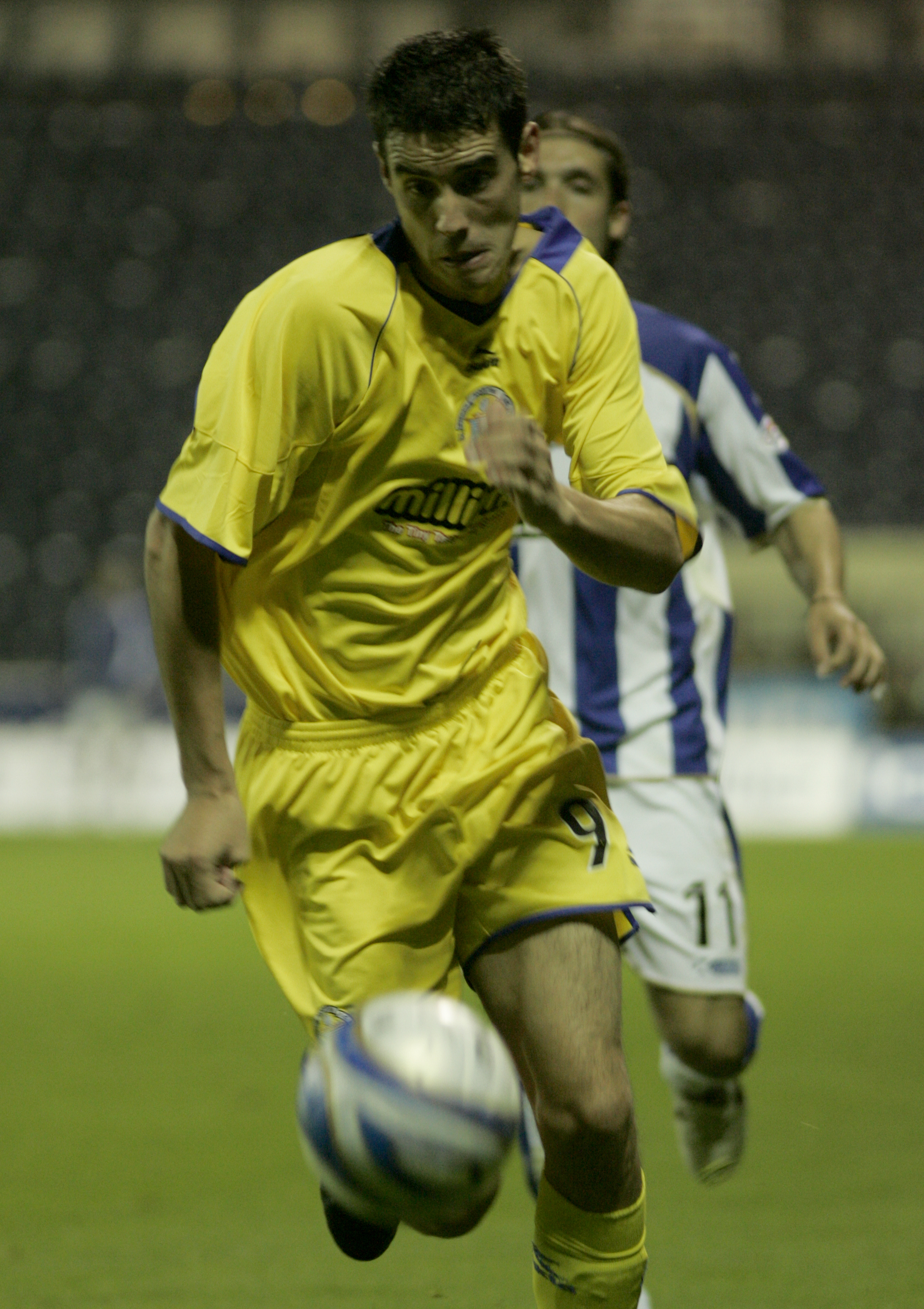
- Graham in 2009

Personal information
- Full name: Brian Graham
- Date of birth: 23 November 1987 (age 38)
- Place of birth: Glasgow, Scotland
- Height: 1.93 m (6 ft 4 in)
- Position: Striker

Team information
- Current team: Ross County
- Number: 9

Youth career
- Hillington F.C.

Senior career*
| Years | Team | Apps | (Gls) |
| 2006–2011 | Greenock Morton | 65 | (10) |
| 2008–2009 | → East Stirlingshire (loan) | 33 | (15) |
| 2011–2013 | Raith Rovers | 58 | (29) |
| 2013–2015 | Dundee United | 31 | (6) |
| 2014–2015 | → St Johnstone (loan) | 24 | (9) |
| 2015–2016 | Ross County | 24 | (6) |
| 2016–2017 | Hibernian | 28 | (4) |
| 2017–2018 | Cheltenham Town | 27 | (5) |
| 2018–2020 | Ross County | 48 | (12) |
| 2020–2025 | Partick Thistle | 155 | (75) |
| 2025–2026 | Falkirk | 24 | (4) |
| 2026– | Ross County | 14 | (15) |

Managerial career
- 2020–2025: Partick Thistle (women)
- 2025: Partick Thistle (co-interim)
- * Club domestic league appearances and goals as of 11:11, 8 November 2026 (UTC)

Brian Graham (born 23 November 1987) is a Scottish football striker who plays for Scottish League One club Ross County.

A striker, Graham spent five years at Greenock Morton after joining the club from Hillington. Whilst at Morton he spent a season on loan at East Stirlingshire in the Third Division. He then played for Raith Rovers, moving from there to Dundee United in 2013. After spending most of the 2014–15 season on loan to St Johnstone, he joined Ross County in June 2015, signed for Hibernian in August 2016 – helping them win the 2016–17 Scottish Championship – then moved to English club Cheltenham Town in August 2017. Graham returned to Ross County in August 2018 and subsequently joined Partick Thistle in 2020, going on to become team captain and one of the club's most prolific goal-scorers, netting exactly 100 goals in 207 appearances. He signed for Falkirk in June 2025.

== Playing career ==
=== Greenock Morton ===
Born in Glasgow, Graham made his senior début for Greenock Morton on 29 April 2006 at Station Park, Forfar against Forfar Athletic. He replaced that season, in order to come into contention for the first team, Allan Moore ordered him and Kevin Kelbie to lose weight (despite being one of the thinnest at the club).

=== Raith Rovers ===
After leaving Morton at the end of 2010–11, he signed for Raith Rovers in May 2011. He scored 11 goals in his first season at Stark's Park, two behind top scorer John Baird. Graham went on to 28 times in his second season at the club as they finished 6th in the First Division.

=== Dundee United ===
Graham was unveiled as a Dundee United player before the SPL club's last game of the 2012–13 season against Celtic at Tannadice, signing a two-year deal as Jon Daly made an exit. Graham was mainly used as a substitute in his first season, with 23 of his 36 appearances coming from the bench. He scored his first goal for the club in a 4–1 win over Partick Thistle, and went on to finish the season with seven goals in total.

=== St Johnstone (loan) ===
In August 2014, Graham was loaned to St Johnstone for the rest of the 2014–15 season. He scored the winning goal on his St Johnstone debut on 30 August 2014 in a 1–0 win away to Motherwell, in the 86th minute, having come on as a substitute. On 20 December 2014, Graham scored from the penalty spot to give St Johnstone a 1–0 win over Inverness Caledonian Thistle, with the penalty being awarded after he appeared to be fouled by Inverness goalkeeper Dean Brill; however, in the days following the match, he was offered a two-match suspension by the Scottish Football Association's compliance officer after it had been alleged he had dived to win the penalty. St Johnstone accepted the two-match suspension.

=== Ross County (first spell) ===
In April 2015, Dundee United announced Graham would be released when his contract expires at the end of the season. It was announced by Ross County in May 2015 that Graham would be joining the club on a two-year contract. He scored 11 goals in his first season at the club and started the 2016 Scottish League Cup Final victory over Hibernian, which gave County their first ever piece of silverware.

Graham began the 2016–17 season in fine form, scoring in all four of Ross County's group stage matches in the reformatted League Cup. He scored the winner in a 1–0 win against Montrose, followed by a 75th-minute penalty against his former club, Raith Rovers to rescue a 1–1 draw the following week. He also netted in a 3–2 to Alloa, and despite scoring a hat-trick as County thrashed Cove Rangers 7–0 on 30 July, it proved to be not enough as the club finished third in their group and thus failed to qualify for the knockout round. A 3–1 defeat to Dundee on the opening day of the Scottish Premiership season proved to be Graham's last match for Ross County as he was released by the club on 19 August 2016, despite having a year left on his contract.

=== Hibernian ===
He signed for Hibernian on 20 August 2016 on a free transfer, although Ross County later received a fee as Hibs gained promotion to the Premiership.

=== Cheltenham Town ===
Graham signed for EFL League Two club Cheltenham Town in August 2017.

=== Ross County return ===
Graham rejoined Ross County on 2 August 2018 after leaving Cheltenham at the end of the 2017–18 season.

=== Partick Thistle ===
In January 2020, Graham signed for Scottish Championship club Partick Thistle on a 2 1/2-year deal. He scored on his debut in a 2–1 defeat away to Arbroath. Scottish football was stopped in March 2020 due to the COVID-19 pandemic, at which time Thistle were in last place in the Championship (two points behind 9th place Queen of the South, although Thistle had a game in hand). A vote was subsequently taken to curtail the Championship, League One and League Two seasons, which meant that Thistle were relegated to League One. Graham remained at the club ahead of the 2020–21 season in League One. After winning the division and finishing as the club's top scorer with 11 goals, he signed a new contract adding an extra year to his deal, extending it until 2023.

Graham scored his first hat-trick for Thistle in a 3–3 draw away to Inverness on 9 February 2022. After finishing the 2021–22 season with 18 goals, he signed a further one-year extension to his contract in summer 2022, with his deal extended to the end of the 2023–24 season. The following season he scored 22 goals in all competitions, becoming the first Thistle striker to hit 20 goals since Mark Roberts. Graham was part of the squad that reached the Scottish Premiership promotion play off final. Following this he added an extra year to his deal until summer 2025.

After another successful start to the 2023–24 season Graham once again extended his Thistle contract, adding an additional year until summer 2026. In the 2023–24 season Graham won the PFA Scottish Championship player of the year, after finishing top scorer in the division with 20 goals. He ended the 2023–24 season on 26 goals in all competitions, the second highest return of his career in a single season.

In May 2025, Graham scored his 99th and 100th goals for Partick Thistle in a 2–0 away win against Ayr United in the Scottish Premiership Play-Offs quarter finals, sending Thistle into the semi final. Graham finished the 2024–25 season once again as both the Scottish Championship top scorer with 15 league goals and Partick Thistle's top scorer with 21 goals in all competitions, in what would turn out to be his final season with the club.

=== Falkirk ===
On 13 June 2025, Graham joined Scottish Premiership club Falkirk for an undisclosed fee, joining on a one-year deal with an option of a further year. Graham scored his first Falkirk goal, coming off the bench in a 3–1 victory over Queen's Park in the Scottish League Cup group stages.

=== Ross County ===
After leaving Falkirk, Graham joined Scottish League One side Ross County on 26 May, 2026 for a third spell at the club. Graham was made Ross County captain ahead of the 2026-27 season.

== Managerial career ==
In September 2020 Graham was appointed manager of Partick Thistle W.F.C. in the second tier of the Scottish Women's Premier League, heading a coaching team comprising three players from the club's men's team. At the end of their first season Thistle were promoted to the Premier Division, and finished their first stint in the SWPL in the Top 6. The following season, Thistle again finished in the Top 6 and reached the final of the Sky Sports Cup, losing 4–1 to Rangers. Graham left this position at the end of the 2024–25 season.

Following the departure of Kris Doolan in February 2025, Graham and Thistle youth coach Mark Wilson took over as co-interim managers of the Partick Thistle men's team. At the end of the season, Wilson was appointed head coach on a permanent basis.

== Career statistics ==
=== Club ===
As of match played 31 October 2026

Appearances and goals by club, season and competition
| Club | Season | League | | | National cup (Note: Includes Scottish Cup, FA Cup) | | League cup (Note: Includes Scottish League Cup, EFL Cup) | | Other | | Total | |
| Club | Season | Division | Apps | Goals | Apps | Goals | Apps | Goals | Apps | Goals | Apps | Goals |
|---|---|---|---|---|---|---|---|---|---|---|---|---|
| Greenock Morton | 2005–06 | Scottish Second Division | 1 | 0 | 0 | 0 | 0 | 0 | 0 | 0 | 1 | 0 |
| Greenock Morton | 2006–07 | Scottish Second Division | 1 | 0 | 0 | 0 | 0 | 0 | 0 | 0 | 1 | 0 |
| Greenock Morton | 2007–08 | Scottish First Division | 13 | 1 | 1 | 0 | 1 | 0 | 3 (Note: Appearance(s) in Scottish Challenge Cup) | 2 | 18 | 3 |
| Greenock Morton | 2008–09 | Scottish First Division | 0 | 0 | 0 | 0 | 0 | 0 | 0 | 0 | 0 | 0 |
| Greenock Morton | 2009–10 | Scottish First Division | 22 | 2 | 1 | 0 | 2 | 0 | 1 | 0 | 26 | 2 |
| Greenock Morton | 2010–11 | Scottish First Division | 28 | 7 | 3 | 2 | 0 | 0 | 0 | 0 | 31 | 9 |
| Greenock Morton | Total | | 65 | 10 | 5 | 2 | 3 | 0 | 4 | 2 | 77 | 14 |
| East Stirling (loan) | 2008–09 | Scottish Third Division | 33 | 15 | 2 | 1 | 1 | 1 | 3 (Note: One appearance in Scottish Challenge Cup, two appearances in Scottish Second Division play-offs) | 1 | 39 | 18 |
| Raith Rovers | 2011–12 | Scottish First Division | 24 | 11 | 0 | 0 | 2 | 0 | 1 | 0 | 27 | 11 |
| Raith Rovers | 2012–13 | Scottish First Division | 34 | 18 | 2 | 2 | 3 | 4 | 2 | 3 | 41 | 27 |
| Raith Rovers | Total | | 58 | 29 | 2 | 2 | 5 | 4 | 3 | 3 | 68 | 38 |
| Dundee United | 2013–14 | Scottish Premiership | 30 | 6 | 3 | 1 | 3 | 0 | – | | 36 | 7 |
| Dundee United | 2014–15 | Scottish Premiership | 1 | 0 | 0 | 0 | 0 | 0 | – | | 1 | 0 |
| Dundee United | Total | | 31 | 6 | 3 | 1 | 3 | 0 | 0 | 0 | 37 | 7 |
| St Johnstone (loan) | 2014–15 | Scottish Premiership | 24 | 9 | 2 | 0 | 2 | 1 | – | | 28 | 10 |
| Ross County | 2015–16 | Scottish Premiership | 23 | 6 | 4 | 4 | 4 | 1 | – | | 31 | 11 |
| Ross County | 2016–17 | Scottish Premiership | 1 | 0 | 0 | 0 | 4 | 6 | – | | 5 | 6 |
| Ross County | Total | | 24 | 6 | 4 | 4 | 8 | 7 | 0 | 0 | 36 | 17 |
| Hibernian | 2016–17 | Scottish Championship | 28 | 4 | 4 | 0 | 0 | 0 | 1 | 1 | 33 | 5 |
| Hibernian | 2017–18 | Scottish Premiership | 0 | 0 | 0 | 0 | 2 | 1 | – | | 2 | 1 |
| Hibernian | Total | | 28 | 4 | 4 | 0 | 2 | 1 | 1 | 1 | 35 | 6 |
| Cheltenham Town | 2017–18 | League Two | 27 | 5 | 1 | 0 | 1 | 0 | 2 (Note: Appearances in EFL Trophy) | 1 | 31 | 6 |
| Ross County | 2018–19 | Scottish Championship | 30 | 8 | 3 | 2 | 1 | 0 | 4 | 4 | 38 | 14 |
| Ross County | 2019–20 | Scottish Premiership | 18 | 4 | 1 | 0 | 4 | 2 | – | | 23 | 6 |
| Ross County | Total | | 48 | 12 | 4 | 2 | 5 | 2 | 4 | 4 | 61 | 20 |
| Partick Thistle | 2019–20 | Scottish Championship | 6 | 3 | — | | | | 1 | 0 | 7 | 3 |
| Partick Thistle | 2020–21 | Scottish League One | 19 | 11 | 2 | 0 | 3 | 0 | — | | 24 | 11 |
| Partick Thistle | 2021–22 | Scottish Championship | 32 | 13 | 2 | 1 | 4 | 4 | 4 (Note: Two appearances in Scottish Challenge Cup, two appearances in Scottish Premiership play-offs) | 0 | 42 | 18 |
| Partick Thistle | 2022–23 | Scottish Championship | 31 | 14 | 2 | 1 | 6 | 2 | 6 (Note: Appearances in Scottish Premiership play-offs) | 5 | 45 | 22 |
| Partick Thistle | 2023–24 | Scottish Championship | 33 | 20 | 3 | 1 | 5 | 3 | 5 (Note: One appearance in Scottish Challenge Cup, four appearances and two goals in Scottish Premiership play-offs) | 2 | 46 | 26 |
| Partick Thistle | 2024–25 | Scottish Championship | 33 | 15 | 1 | 0 | 4 | 3 | 5 (Note: One appearance and goal in Scottish Challenge Cup, four appearances and two goals in Scottish Premiership play-offs) | 3 | 43 | 21 |
| Partick Thistle | Total | | 155 | 75 | 10 | 3 | 22 | 12 | 21 | 10 | 207 | 100 |
| Falkirk | 2025–26 | Scottish Premiership | 24 | 4 | 2 | 0 | 5 | 1 | – | | 31 | 5 |
| Ross County | 2026–27 | Scottish League One | 13 | 14 | 0 | 0 | 6 | 5 | 4 | 0 | 23 | 19 |
| Career total | | | 529 | 191 | 39 | 15 | 63 | 34 | 42 | 22 | 673 | 261 |

== Managerial statistics ==
As of match played 16 May 2025

Managerial record by team and tenure
| Team | From | To | Record | | | | |
| Team | From | To | P | W | D | L | Win % |
|---|---|---|---|---|---|---|---|
| Partick Thistle (co-interim) | 18 February 2025 | 16 May 2025 | 15 | 6 | 4 | 5 | 40.00 |
| Total | | | 15 | 6 | 4 | 5 | 40.00 |

== Honours ==
Ross County

- Scottish Championship: 2018–19
- Scottish League Cup: 2015–16
- Scottish Challenge Cup: 2018–19

Hibernian

- Scottish Championship: 2016–17

Partick Thistle

- Scottish League One: 2020–21

Individual

- SPFL Championship Player of the Month: April 2019
