= 2010–11 Raith Rovers F.C. season =

Raith Rovers
2010–11 season
- Chairman: Dave Somerville
- Manager: John McGlynn
- Stadium: Stark's Park
- Scottish Football League First Division: 2nd
- Scottish Cup: 3rd round (lost to Alloa Athletic)
- League Cup: 3rd round (lost to Aberdeen)
- Challenge Cup: 1st round (lost to Cowdenbeath)
- Top goalscorer: League: John Baird (13); All: John Baird (15)
Home colours	Away colours	Third colours

Raith Rovers competed in the Scottish First Division, Scottish Cup, Scottish League Cup & Scottish Challenge Cup during the 2010–11 season.

== Fixtures ==
*Note: Tayport, Whitehill Welfare & Civil Service Strollers friendlies were a Raith Rovers XI.

Date	Venue	Opponents	Score	Competition	Raith Rovers scorer(s)	Match Report	Referee
10 July 2010	Links Park	Montrose	3–1	F	Davidson, Williamson (pen.), Baird	Raith Rovers Official Site	Bryan Braidwood
13 July 2010	Station Park	Forfar Athletic	1–0	F	O'Carroll (trialist)	Raith Rovers Official Site	Frank McDermott
17 July 2010	Shielfield Park	Berwick Rangers	1–1	F	Baird	Raith Rovers Official Site	Brian Colvin
19 July 2010	The Canniepairt	Tayport	0–4	F			Ross McIntyre
20 July 2010	Ochilview Park	Stenhousemuir	1–0	F	Weir	Raith Rovers Official Site	Iain Brines
22 July 2010	Ferguson Park	Whitehill Welfare	4–3	F	Unknown		Graeme Leslie
24 July 2010	Stark's Park	Cowdenbeath	0–1	SCC		Raith Rovers Official Site	Frank McDermott
27 July 2010	Stark's Park	Dundee United	0–5	F		Raith Rovers Official Site	Brian Winter
31 July 2010	Stark's Park	East Fife	4–1	SLC	Tadé (2), Baird, Mole	Raith Rovers Official Site	John McKendrick
1 August 2010	Muirhouse	Civil Service Strollers	2–1	F	Unknown		Alan Hogg
7 August 2010	Stark's Park	Partick Thistle	4–0	First Division	Ferry, Baird (pen.)	Raith Rovers Official Site	Euan Norris
14 August 2010	Palmerston Park	Queen of the South	3–1	First Division	Ferry, Baird, Mole	Raith Rovers Official Site	Steven McLean
21 August 2010	Stark's Park	Dunfermline Athletic	2–0	First Division	Davidson, Ellis	Raith Rovers Official Site	Stevie O'Reilly
24 August 2010	Stark's Park	Hamilton Academical	1–0	SLC	Ferry	Raith Rovers Official Site	Steve Conroy
28 August 2010	Stark's Park	Greenock Morton	1–0	First Division	Tadé	Raith Rovers Official Site	Bobby Madden
11 September 2010	Victoria Park	Ross County	0–0	First Division		Raith Rovers Official Site	Anthony Law
18 September 2010	Dens Park	Dundee	0–0	First Division		Raith Rovers Official Site	David Somers
22 September 2010	Pittodrie Stadium	Aberdeen	2–3	SLC	Mole, Tadé	Raith Rovers Official Site	Iain Brines
25 September 2010	Stark's Park	Falkirk	2–1	First Division	Tadé, Dyer	Raith Rovers Official Site	Steve Conroy
2 October 2010	Stark's Park	Stirling Albion	0–2	First Division		Raith Rovers Official Site	William Collum
16 October 2010	Central Park	Cowdenbeath	2–1	First Division	Baird, Simmons	Raith Rovers Official Site	Bobby Madden
23 October 2010	Stark's Park	Ross County	1–0	First Division	Mole	Raith Rovers Official Site	Brian Winter
30 October 2010	Cappielow	Greenock Morton	1–0	First Division	Walker	Raith Rovers Official Site	Steve Conroy
6 November 2010	Stark's Park	Queen of the South	0–1	First Division		Raith Rovers Official Site	Steven McLean
13 November 2010	East End Park	Dunfermline Athletic	2–2	First Division	Williamson, Walker	Raith Rovers Official Site	Eddie Smith
20 November 2010	Recreation Park	Alloa Athletic	2–4	SC	Baird, Murray	Raith Rovers Official Site	George Salmond
26 December 2010	Firhill Stadium	Partick Thistle	0–0	First Division		Raith Rovers Official Site	George Salmond
29 December 2010	Falkirk Stadium	Falkirk	0–0	First Division		Raith Rovers Official Site	Stevie O'Reilly
2 January 2011	Stark's Park	Dunfermline Athletic	2–1	First Division	Campbell, Tadé	Raith Rovers Official Site	Charlie Richmond
15 January 2011	Victoria Park	Ross County	1–0	First Division	Ellis	Raith Rovers Official Site	Steven Nicholls
22 January 2011	Stark's Park	Greenock Morton	2–2	First Division	Baird, Walker	Raith Rovers Official Site	Craig Thomson
29 January 2011	Stark's Park	Falkirk	1–2	First Division	Ellis	Raith Rovers Official Site	Bobby Madden
5 February 2011	Forthbank Stadium	Stirling Albion	3–1	First Division	Tadé (2), Walker	Raith Rovers Official Site	Alan Muir
12 February 2011	Dens Park	Dundee	1–2	First Division	Murray	Raith Rovers Official Site	George Salmond
19 February 2011	Central Park	Cowdenbeath	3–0	First Division	Baird, Simmons, Campbell	Raith Rovers Official Site	Anthony Law
22 February 2011	Stark's Park	Dundee	1–2	First Division	Walker	Raith Rovers Official Site	Iain Brines
26 February 2011	Stark's Park	Stirling Albion	2–1	First Division	Murray, Baird	Raith Rovers Official Site	Steve Conroy
5 March 2011	Palmerston Park	Queen of the South	2–0	First Division	Baird, Campbell	Raith Rovers Official Site	Charlie Richmond
12 March 2011	Stark's Park	Partick Thistle	0–2	First Division		Raith Rovers Official Site	Frank McDermott
15 March 2011	Stark's Park	Cowdenbeath	2–1	First Division	Tadé, Baird	Raith Rovers Official Site	Calum Murray
19 March 2011	Cappielow	Greenock Morton	0–0	First Division		Raith Rovers Official Site	Crawford Allan
22 March 2011	Stark's Park	Ross County	1–1	First Division	Tadé	Raith Rovers Official Site	Stephen Finnie
26 March 2011	Falkirk Stadium	Falkirk	1–2	First Division	Baird	Raith Rovers Official Site	Steve Conroy
2 April 2011	Stark's Park	Dundee	2–1	First Division	Tadé, Walker	Raith Rovers Official Site	Craig Charleston
9 April 2011	Stark's Park	Cowdenbeath	2–2	First Division	Murray, Campbell	Raith Rovers Official Site	Brian Winter
16 April 2011	Forthbank Stadium	Stirling Albion	2–1	First Division	Walker, Baird	Raith Rovers Official Site	Frank McDermott
23 April 2011	East End Park	Dunfermline Athletic	1–2	First Division	Baird	Raith Rovers Official Site	George Salmond
30 April 2011	Stark's Park	Queen of the South	0–1	First Division		Raith Rovers Official Site	John McKendrick
7 May 2011	Firhill Stadium	Partick Thistle	0–3	First Division		Raith Rovers Official Site	Eddie Smith

== League table ==
Pos	Team	Pld	W	D	L	GF	GA	GD	Pts	Promotion, qualification or relegation
1	Dunfermline Athletic (C, P)	36	20	10	6	66	31	+35	70	Promotion to the Premier League
2	Raith Rovers	36	17	9	10	47	35	+12	60	
3	Falkirk	36	17	7	12	57	41	+16	58	
4	Queen of the South	36	14	7	15	54	53	+1	49	
5	Partick Thistle	36	12	11	13	44	39	+5	47	

Source: SPFL
Rules for classification: 1) points; 2) goal difference; 3) number of goals scored.
(C) Champions; (P) Promoted
