= Joe Hamill =

Scottish footballer

Joseph Hamill
Personal information
- Full name: Joseph Patrick Hamill
- Date of birth: 25 February 1984 (age 42)
- Place of birth: Bellshill, Scotland
- Position: Winger

Youth career
- East Stirlingshire

Senior career*
Years	Team	Apps	(Gls)
2000–2005	Heart of Midlothian	57	(4)
2005–2006	Leicester City	12	(0)
2006–2011	Livingston	102	(2)
2010	→ Queen of the South (loan)	11	(0)
2010	→ Östersunds FK (loan)		
2011–2013	Raith Rovers	60	(3)
2013–2014	Formartine United		
2014–2015	Airdrieonians	2	(0)
2014–2015	→ Bonnyrigg Rose (loan)		
2015	Bonnyrigg Rose		
2015–2017	Linlithgow Rose		
2017–????	Haddington Athletic		

Managerial career
- 2017–2021: Haddington Athletic
- 2021–2022: Musselburgh Athletic
- * Club domestic league appearances and goals

Joseph Patrick Hamill (born 25 February 1984) is a Scottish professional footballer. He has played for Heart of Midlothian, Leicester City, Livingston, Queen of the South, Raith Rovers, Formartine United, Airdrieonians and Bonnyrigg Rose.

== Career ==
Hamill had a spell as a teenager playing for East Stirlingshire Boys Club until he joined the youth development scheme at Hearts, graduating from there to the youth academy in 2000. Known as a hard working and tricky winger, he was promoted in April 2002 to the first team squad after major roles in the Under-18s and Under-21s. He was featured in the side that won Youth League championship in season 2000–01.

Hamill was on the fringes of the first team squad in season 2002–03, however during the following season he started to play more games for the first team, making 20 competitive appearances. He also obtained a massive confidence boost when, in May 2004, he scored the only goal in a SPL match against Rangers at Ibrox.

During the 2004–2005 season, Hamill gained competitive European experience by playing during the Tynecastle outfit's UEFA Cup campaign. He also scored the winner in the Edinburgh derby against Hibernian on 24 October 2004.

In August 2005, Hamill was signed by his former Hearts boss Craig Levein for Leicester City in the English Championship, joining former Jambo teammates Mark de Vries, Alan Maybury and Patrick Kisnorbo. He scored his first goal for the club after 37 minutes of his debut in a League Cup defeat of Bury and made his league debut a week later, coming off the bench in the 1–1 draw away to Hull City.

On 28 July 2006, it was announced that Hamill had parted ways with Leicester City after just 11 months at the club, having his contract terminated by mutual consent. His then manager Rob Kelly, who had replaced Levein in early 2006, said that Hamill had left the club to seek first team football elsewhere. He also said Hamill was a smashing lad and never caused an ounce of trouble at the club.

On 2 August 2006, he joined Scottish First Division club Livingston on a free transfer. On 29 January 2010, Dumfries club Queen of the South confirmed that Hamill had signed on loan with Steve Tosh moving in the opposite direction. After returning to Livingston, Hamill went out on loan again, this time to Swedish club Östersunds FK on a six-month deal. Upon his return to Livingston, Hamill was involved in the squad as the club won the Second Division title.

On 1 June 2011, Kirkcaldy club Raith Rovers signed Hamill on a 2-year contract. On 8 May 2013, it was confirmed that Hamill had been released.

After leaving Raith Rovers, Hamill signed for Highland League club Formartine United in August 2013. In December 2013, Hamill rejected a move to an unnamed League One club saying that he wanted to stay and try to help Formartine win the title. At the end of the season he was released by the club.

On 8 June 2014 Airdrieonians confirmed that they had signed Hamill for the 2014–2015 season.

In October 2014, Hamill moved to Junior club Bonnyrigg Rose on loan. On 30 January 2015, he signed for the club permanently.

== Managerial career ==
Hamill was appointed manager of Haddington Athletic in 2017. He left to become manager of Musselburgh Athletic in 2021.
