= Ludovic Roy =

French footballer (born 1977)

Personal information
- Full name: Ludovic Roy
- Date of birth: 18 August 1977 (age 49)
- Place of birth: Tours, France
- Height: 1.91 m (6 ft 3 in)
- Position: Goalkeeper

Youth career
- –: Châteauroux

Senior career*
Years	Team	Apps	(Gls)
1998–2003	St Mirren	122	(0)
2002	→ St Johnstone (loan)	2	(0)
2003–2005	Ayr United	57	(0)
2005–2006	Livingston	6	(0)
2006–2009	Dundee	37	(0)
2009–2010	Queen of the South	4	(0)
2010–2011	Cowdenbeath	6	(0)
2011–2012	Raith Rovers	0	(0)
2012–2013	Partick Thistle	0	(0)
Total		234	(0)
- * Club domestic league appearances and goals as of 1 December 2011

Ludovic Roy (born 18 August 1977) is a French former professional footballer who played as a goalkeeper. Roy spent his entire professional career in Scotland, most notably having started at St Mirren.

== Club career ==
=== Early days ===
Roy spent his youth career in his native France with La Berrichonne de Châteauroux.

=== St Mirren ===
Roy arrived in Scotland at the start of the 1998–99 season, joining St Mirren from La Berrichonne de Châteauroux in France. Roy was a member of the squad that won promotion to the SPL at the end of season 1999–2000.

During 2002 Roy had a short loan spell at St Johnstone where he made 2 league appearances before returning to Love Street for the start of season 2002–03.

Roy stayed with St Mirren for 5 seasons and in total made 122 league appearances.

=== Ayr United ===
Roy signed for Ayr United at the start of the 2003–04 season and spent 2 seasons with the Somerset Park club and in total made 57 league appearances.

=== Livingston ===
Roy signed for Livingston at the start of the 2005–06 season. Roy only made 6 league appearances in his one season at Almondvale.

=== Dundee ===
Roy signed for Dundee at the start of the 2006–07 season and made his first appearance for the club in a pre-season friendly at Forfar Athletic.

However, he suffered a rib injury in his first competitive match on the opening day of the season against Partick Thistle and missed the early part of the campaign as a consequence. Roy failed to have his contract renewed when it expired at the end of the 2008–09 season.

Roy made 37 league appearances for the Dens Park club during his 3 seasons at Dundee.

=== Queen of the South ===
Roy was signed by Gordon Chisholm for Dumfries club Queen of the South on 29 May 2009 for the start of the 2009–10 season. Roy signed a one-year contract with the Palmerston club.

In competition with David Hutton for the goalkeeper's jersey, Roy made 7 appearances for Queens (in league and cup) before picking up a hip injury on 26 September 2009.

After a lengthy hip injury lay-off, Roy appeared as an unused substitute goalkeeper for Queens on 6 April 2010 at Victoria Park, Dingwall for the match versus Ross County, as cover for Scott Fox. The match ended in a 1–1 draw.

Roy was released by Queens at the end of the 2009–10 season.

=== Cowdenbeath ===
He signed for Cowdenbeath in 2010 where he served as goalkeeper coach as well as a player.

=== Raith Rovers ===
At the start of November 2011 Roy went on a trial to Raith Rovers and was included in the squad as a substitute in all their matches since then until 1 December 2011 when he signed a contract with the club.

In January 2012 his contract expired and he left the club.

== After playing ==
He is now a businessman, having set up a personal fitness company.

== International career ==
Roy has represented France at U-15, 16, 17 and 18 levels.
