= Laurie Ellis =

Scottish footballer (born 1979)

Personal information
- Full name: Laurence Ellis
- Date of birth: 7 November 1979 (age 46)
- Place of birth: Edinburgh, Scotland
- Position: Defender

Team information
- Current team: Hearts of Midlothian (Head of Academy Coaching)

Youth career
- Links United

Senior career*
Years	Team	Apps	(Gls)
1998–2003	Raith Rovers	90	(1)
2003–2005	St Mirren	44	(2)
2005–2006	Raith Rovers	35	(3)
2006–2007	Cowdenbeath	32	(3)
2007–2008	Stirling Albion	33	(1)
2008–2016	Raith Rovers	162	(6)
Total		396	(16)

Managerial career
- 2015: Raith Rovers (caretaker)
- 2017: Dundee United (caretaker)
- 2018: Dundee United (caretaker)
- 2021: Queen's Park
- * Club domestic league appearances and goals

Laurie Ellis (born 7 November 1979) is a Scottish football coach and former professional footballer who is a coach with the Rangers Academy. He played for Raith Rovers over three spells, as well as St Mirren, Cowdenbeath and Stirling Albion. As a coach, he has twice served as caretaker manager at Dundee United and managed Queen's Park between May and December 2021.

== Playing career ==
Ellis was born in Edinburgh. He started his senior career with Raith Rovers after joining from Edinburgh amateur club Links United. Ellis debuted on 12 December 1998 versus Greenock Morton in the Scottish First Division. Ellis made over 90 appearances for the Kirkcaldy club during his first spell and scored his first league goal on 25 November 2000 in a defeat versus Ayr United.

Ellis remained at the Fife club until 2003, when he signed for St Mirren. Ellis debuted on 2 August 2003 versus Queen's Park in the Scottish League Challenge Cup and stayed with the Paisley club for two seasons, before leaving at the end of the 2004–05 season when his contract expired. After being released by the Buddies, Ellis returned to his former club at Stark's Park, debuting for a second time on 30 July 2005 versus Elgin City in the Scottish League Challenge Cup. Ellis remained at the Kirkcaldy club for one season before joining their local Fife rivals Cowdenbeath, whose manager was his former St Mirren team-mate Mixu Paatelainen.

Ellis debuted for the Blue Brazil on 5 August 2006 versus Alloa Athletic in the Scottish Second Division and went on to feature in all but four of their matches during the 2006–07 season, scoring six goals. At the end of the season he returned to play in the First Division, after signing for newly promoted Stirling Albion on 1 June 2007. Ellis debuted for the Binos on 4 August 2007 versus Partick Thistle. During May 2008, Ellis returned for a third spell at Stark's Park, after one season at Forthbank . During August 2010, Ellis played his 250th match for Raith Rovers and on 15 October 2011 Ellis played his 300th game, scoring in a 2–0 win over the Harry Wraggs.

== Managerial and coaching career ==
In July 2012, Ellis took up a role as first-team coach at Raith, as well as continuing as a player. In May 2016, he moved to Dundee United as assistant manager to Ray McKinnon. In October 2017, when McKinnon departed the club, Ellis was appointed caretaker manager. Ellis stayed on at United as assistant manager to Csaba László. On 30 September 2018, Ellis was appointed caretaker manager for a second occasion, after László departed the Terrors. Ellis was also assistant manager to Robbie Neilson at Tannadice for a brief spell until Neilson got his backroom team organised.

Ellis was appointed as assistant manager to Gary Naysmith at Queen of the South in March 2019, but left the club two months later when Naysmith was sacked. After working for a time alongside Keith Wright at one of the Scottish Football Association Performance Schools, he joined Queen's Park as assistant manager in January 2020, once again working under McKinnon.

Ellis was appointed as head coach of Queen's Park on 21 May 2021, replacing former head coach Ray McKinnon. On 31 December, Ellis was relieved of his duties as manager following a downturn in form.

In July 2022, Ellis joined Rangers in a coaching role within the club's Academy.

== Managerial statistics ==
As of match played 29 December 2021

Managerial record by team and tenure
Team	From	To	Record							
Team	From	To	G	W	D	L	GF	GA	GD	Win %
Raith Rovers (caretaker)	27 April 2015	22 May 2015	1	0	1	0	2	2	+0	0.00
Dundee United (caretaker)	24 October 2017	8 November 2017	2	2	0	0	4	1	+3	100.00
Dundee United (caretaker)	30 September 2018	8 October 2018	1	0	0	1	0	2	−2	0.00
Queen's Park	21 May 2021	31 December 2021	26	8	12	6	38	27	+11	30.77
Total			30	10	13	7	44	32	+12	33.33

== Honours ==
Raith Rovers

- Scottish Second Division: 2002–03, 2008–09
