= Allan Walker (footballer) =

Scottish footballer

Personal information
- Date of birth: 3 January 1986 (age 40)
- Place of birth: Edinburgh, Scotland
- Position: Midfielder

Youth career
- –2002: Hibernian
- 2002–2005: Livingston

Senior career*
Years	Team	Apps	(Gls)
2005–2008	Livingston	72	(3)
2006–2007	→ Raith Rovers (loan)	7	(0)
2008–2013	Raith Rovers	139	(16)
2013–2014	Brechin City	16	(0)
2014–2015	East Fife	46	(3)
2015–2017	Berwick Rangers	13	(1)
Total		293	(23)

Managerial career
- 2019–2021: Syngenta
- * Club domestic league appearances and goals

Allan Walker (born 3 January 1986) is a Scottish former footballer who played as a midfielder.

== Playing career ==
Walker was born in Edinburgh and began his career at Livingston. He signed on loan for Raith Rovers on 26 October 2007 for one month, then in June 2008 signed for the club permanently. During his time at Raith Rovers, he was part of the side that won the 2008–09 Second Division title.

On 6 June 2013, Walker signed for Scottish League One side Brechin City. Walker spent one season at Glebe Park before moving to East Fife in July 2014, spending eighteen months with the side before signing for Berwick Rangers in January 2016. Walker subsequently left Berwick in September 2016.

== Coaching career ==
Walker was appointed as manager of Syngenta in 2019, but departed the club in 2021.

== Honours ==
Raith Rovers

- Scottish Second Division: 1

2008–09
