= 2011–12 Peterhead F.C. season =

Peterhead
2011–12 season
- Chairman: Rodger Morrison
- Manager: John Sheran
- Stadium: Balmoor
- Scottish Third Division: Fifth
- Challenge Cup: Round Two
- League Cup: Round one
- Scottish Cup: Fourth round
- Top goalscorer: League: Rory McAllister (20); All: Rory McAllister (22)
- Highest home attendance: 626 vs. Elgin City, 2 January 2012
- Lowest home attendance: 396 vs. Berwick Rangers, 24 March 2012

The 2011–12 season was Peterhead's first season back in the Scottish Third Division, having been relegated from the Scottish Second Division at the end of the 2010–11 season. Peterhead also competed in the Challenge Cup, League Cup and the Scottish Cup.

== Summary ==
Peterhead finished fifth in the Third Division. They reached the second round of the Scottish Challenge Cup, the first round of the League Cup and the fourth round of the Scottish Cup, losing 3–0 to Scottish Premier League side Celtic at Balmoor.

== Results & fixtures ==
Win Draw Loss Postponed

=== Third Division ===
6 August 2011 Scottish Third Division	Clyde	2–0	Peterhead	Broadwood Stadium
15:00	Sweeney 45'; McDonald 75'	BBC Report		Attendance: 711; Referee: Robertson

13 August 2011 Scottish Third Division	Peterhead	2–3	Annan Athletic	Balmoor Stadium
15:00	Deasley 8'; McAllister 41'	BBC Report	McKechnie 19', 50'; Harty 73' (pen.)	Attendance: 448; Referee: Anderson

20 August 2011 Scottish Third Division	East Stirlingshire	0–2	Peterhead	Ochilview Park
15:00		BBC Report	Deasley 38'; McAllister 68' (pen.)	Attendance: 287; Referee: Colvin

27 August 2011 Scottish Third Division	Alloa Athletic	2–1	Peterhead	Recreation Park
15:00	Cawley 46', 67'	SFL Report	McAllister 30'	Attendance: 507; Referee: Barry Cook

10 September 2011 Scottish Third Division	Peterhead	1–3	Elgin City	Balmoor Stadium
	Sellars 46'	BBC Report	Gunn 4'; Nicolson 8'; Duff 45'; Moore (yellow card) 88' (red card)	Attendance: 596; Referee: Robertson

17 September 2011 Scottish Third Division	Berwick Rangers	2–1	Peterhead	Shielfield Park
	McLaren 12', 43'	BBC Report	McAllister 15' (pen.)	Attendance: 334; Referee: Madden

24 September 2011 Scottish Third Division	Peterhead	1–1	Queen's Park	Balmoor Stadium
	Bavidge 73'	BBC Report	Watt 52'	Attendance: 478; Referee: Northcroft

1 October 2011 Scottish Third Division	Montrose	2–1	Peterhead	Links Park
15:00	Masson 41'; Boyle 66'	BBC Report	McAllister 12'	Attendance: 359; Referee: Colvin

15 October 2011 Scottish Third Division	Peterhead	1–3	Queen's Park	Balmoor Stadium
	McAllister 68'	SFL Report	McKeown 12'; Stirling 39'; Moore 90'	Attendance: 405; Referee: Cook

29 October 2011 Scottish Third Division	Annan Athletic	P–P	Peterhead	Galabank
15:00

5 November 2011 Scottish Third Division	Peterhead	0–0	Clyde	Balmoor Stadium
15:00		SFL Report	Hay (yellow card) 83' (red card)	Attendance: 517; Referee: Dallas

8 November 2011 Scottish Third Division	Annan Athletic	2–0	Peterhead	Galabank
19:30	Muirhead 10' (Penalty); Steele 11'	SFL Report		Attendance: 388; Referee: Robertson

12 November 2011 Scottish Third Division	Peterhead	1–1	Alloa Athletic	Balmoor Stadium
15:00	McDowall 87' (Own Goal)	SFL Report	One 77'	Attendance: 528; Referee: Northcroft

26 November 2011 Scottish Third Division	Elgin City	P–P	Peterhead	Borough Briggs
15:00

3 December 2011 Scottish Third Division	Queen's Park	1–1	Peterhead	Hampden Park
15:00	Murray 82'	SFL Report	McAllister 48'	Attendance: 431; Referee: Graham

10 December 2011 Scottish Third Division	Peterhead	P–P	Berwick Rangers	Balmoor Stadium
15:00

17 December 2011 Scottish Third Division	Stranraer	2–1	Peterhead	Stair Park
15:00	Moore 80'; Stirling 90'	SFL Report	Deasley 58'	Attendance: 290; Referee: Aitken

20 December 2011 Scottish Third Division	Peterhead	1–0	Berwick Rangers	Balmoor Stadium
19:45	McAllister 45' (pen.)	SFL Report		Attendance: 438; Referee: Salmond

26 December 2011 Scottish Third Division	Peterhead	2–3	Montrose	Balmoor Stadium
15:00	Strachan 74'; Bavidge 90'	SFL Report	Strachan 15' (Own Goal); McGowan 62'; Crawford 90'	Attendance: 566; Referee: Northcroft

2 January 2012 Scottish Third Division	Peterhead	3–0	Elgin City	Balmoor Stadium
15:00	McAllister 21' (Penalty); Sharp 45'; Ross 72'	SFL Report	Clark (red card) 19'	Attendance: 626; Referee: Robertson

7 January 2012 Scottish Third Division	Alloa Athletic	P–P	Peterhead	Recreation Park
15:00

14 January 2012 Scottish Third Division	Peterhead	1–0	East Stirlingshire	Balmoor Stadium
15:00	Wyness 35'	SFL Report		Attendance: 451; Referee: Anderson

21 January 2012 Scottish Third Division	Clyde	0–1	Peterhead	Broadwood Stadium
15:00		SFL Report	Bavidge 3'	Attendance: 456; Referee: Brian Colvin

28 January 2012 Scottish Third Division	Peterhead	2–1	Queen's Park	Balmoor Stadium
15:00	McAllister 62', 67'	SFL Report	Burns 34'	Attendance: 505; Referee: Winter

31 January 2012 Scottish Third Division	Alloa Athletic	3–1	Peterhead	Recreation Park
19:45	Gordon 13'; Docherty 37'; May 65'	BBC Report	McAllister 35'	Attendance: 429; Referee: Madden

4 February 2012 Scottish Third Division	Berwick Rangers	P–P	Peterhead	Shielfield Park
15:00

11 February 2012 Scottish Third Division	Peterhead	1–1	Stranraer	Balmoor Stadium
15:00	McAllister 42' (Penalty)	SFL Report	Malcolm 1'	Attendance: 435; Referee: Finnie

14 February 2012 Scottish Third Division	Elgin City	6–1	Peterhead	Borough Briggs
19:45	Ross 25' (Own goal); Millar 53'; McAllister 55' (Own goal); MacDonald 70' (Own goal); Cameron 90'; Gunn 90'	SFL Report	Redman 80'	Attendance: 431; Referee: Northcroft

18 February 2012 Scottish Third Division	Montrose	1–3	Peterhead	Links Park
15:00	Boyle 62'	SFL Report	Webster 32'; Ross 51'; Bavidge 54'	Attendance: 358; Referee: Aitken

25 February 2012 Scottish Third Division	Peterhead	3–2	Annan Athletic	Balmoor Stadium
15:00	Tully 55'; Bavidge 60', 79'; McAllister (yellow card) 81' (red card)	SFL Report	Muirhead 15' (Penalty), 45'	Attendance: 453; Referee: Hilland

28 February 2012 Scottish Third Division	Berwick Rangers	0 –1	Peterhead	Shielfield Park
19:45		SFL Report	Bavidge 83'	Attendance: 278; Referee: Somers

3 March 2012 Scottish Third Division	East Stirlingshire	6–3	Peterhead	Ochilview Park
15:00	Hunter 10'; Devlin 23'; Lurinsky 33' (Penalty); Maxwell 38'; Stirling 41', 90'; Maxwell (yellow card) 62' (red card)	SFL Report	Sharp 1'; MacDonald 50'; McBain 57'; MacDonald (red card) 94'	Attendance: 277; Referee: Beaton

10 March 2012 Scottish Third Division	Elgin City	1–2	Peterhead	Borough Briggs
15:00	Nicolson 2'	SFL Report	Bavidge 38'; Redman 53'	Attendance: 1,072; Referee: Steven

17 March 2012 Scottish Third Division	Peterhead	0–1	Alloa Athletic	Balmoor Stadium
15:00		SFL Report	May 20'	Attendance: 488; Referee: Robertson

24 March 2012 Scottish Third Division	Peterhead	1–2	Berwick Rangers	Balmoor Stadium
15:00	McAllister 49' (Penalty)	SFL Report	Handling 23', 56'; Forster (red card) 58'	Attendance: 396; Referee: McDermott

31 March 2012 Scottish Third Division	Queen's Park	0–1	Peterhead	Hampden Park
15:00		SFL Report	McAllister 54'	Attendance: 441; Referee: Muir

7 April 2012 Scottish Third Division	Peterhead	2–1	Montrose	Balmoor Stadium
15:00	McAllister 9', 65'	SFL Report	Crawford 55'	Attendance: 458; Referee: Somers

14 April 2012 Scottish Third Division	Stranraer	0–3	Peterhead	Stair Park
15:00		SFL Report	McAllister 34', 75'; McBain 82'	Attendance: 291; Referee: Robertson

21 April 2012 Scottish Third Division	Peterhead	1–1	Clyde	Balmoor Stadium
15:00	Gray 48'	SFL Report	Gallagher 90'	Attendance: 497; Referee: Barry Cook

28 April 2012 Scottish Third Division	Annan Athletic	0 –3	Peterhead	Galabank
15:00		SFL Report	Deasley 21'; MacDonald 49'; McAllister 84'	Attendance: 408; Referee: Anderson

5 May 2012 Scottish Third Division	Peterhead	2–0	East Stirlingshire	Balmoor Stadium
15:00	Redman 12'; Ross 50'	SFL Report		Attendance: 494; Referee: Robertson

=== Challenge Cup ===
23 July 2011 Challenge Cup R1	Peterhead	2–2 (a.e.t.) (5–4 p)	Alloa Athletic	Balmoor
	Beasley 30'; McAllister 60'	BBC Report	McCord 16'; Wright 73'	Attendance: 443; Referee: Hilland

9 August 2011 Challenge Cup R2	Annan Athletic	4–2	Peterhead	Galabank
	Harty 30', 48', 87'; Muirhead 31'	BBC Report	Redman 49'; McAllister 75' (pen.)	Attendance: 359; Referee: Finnie

=== Scottish League Cup ===
30 July 2011 League Cup R1	Forfar Athletic	2–0	Peterhead	Station Park
	Crawford 43'; Templeman 61'	BBC Report		Attendance: 452; Referee: Roache

=== Scottish Cup ===
22 October 2011 Scottish Cup round 2	Peterhead	2 –0	Nairn County	Balmoor Stadium
15:00	Bavidge 12', 24'	Sky Report		Attendance: 625; Referee: Anderson

19 November 2011 Scottish Cup round 3	Inverurie Loco Works	2–4	Peterhead	Harlaw Park
	Park 25'; McLean 57'	BBC Report	Redman 18'; Ross 22'; McDonald 44'; McAllister 74'	Attendance: 998; Referee: Charleston

7 January 2012 Scottish Cup round 4	Peterhead	0 –3	Celtic	Balmoor Stadium
15:00		BBC Report	Stokes 36', 57', 82'	Attendance: 4,505; Referee: Muir

== Player statistics ==
=== Squad ===
Last updated 5 May 2012

No.	Pos	Nat	Player	Total		Third Division		Scottish Cup		League Cup		Challenge Cup	
No.	Pos	Nat	Player	Apps	Goals	Apps	Goals	Apps	Goals	Apps	Goals	Apps	Goals
	GK	(Scotland) SCO	Neil Duffy	2	0	1	0	0	0	0	0	1	0
	GK	(Scotland) SCO	Paul Jarvie	18	0	17	0	1	0	0	0	0	0
	GK	(Scotland) SCO	Raymond Jellema	25	0	21	0	2	0	1	0	1	0
	DF	(Scotland) SCO	David Donald	41	0	36	0	3	0	0	0	2	0
	DF	(Scotland) SCO	Callum MacDonald	38	2	32	2	3	0	1	0	2	0
	DF	(Scotland) SCO	Paul Watson	9	0	6	0	0	0	1	0	2	0
	DF	(Scotland) SCO	Alan Rattray	7	0	6	0	0	0	1	0	0	0
	DF	(Scotland) SCO	Scott Ross	28	2	24	2	3	0	1	0	0	0
	DF	(Scotland) SCO	Lewis Davidson	22	0	19	0	2	0	0	0	1	0
	DF	(Scotland) SCO	Ryan Strachan	31	1	28	1	3	0	0	0	0	0
	DF	(Scotland) SCO	Craig Tully	11	1	11	1	0	0	0	0	0	0
	DF	(Scotland) SCO	Ross Smith	8	0	8	0	0	0	0	0	0	0
	MF	(Scotland) SCO	Nicky Clark	0	0	0	0	0	0	0	0	0	0
	MF	(Scotland) SCO	Aaron Conway	12	0	9	0	0	0	1	0	2	0
	MF	(Scotland) SCO	Russell Duncan	5	0	5	0	0	0	0	0	0	0
	MF	(Scotland) SCO	Roy McBain	34	2	29	2	2	0	1	0	2	0
	MF	(Scotland) SCO	Jamie Redman	39	4	33	3	3	0	1	0	2	1
	MF	(Scotland) SCO	Barry Sellars	10	1	8	1	0	0	1	0	1	0
	MF	(Scotland) SCO	Graeme Sharp	34	2	28	2	3	0	1	0	2	0
	MF	(Scotland) SCO	Paul Young	0	0	0	0	0	0	0	0	0	0
	MF	(Scotland) SCO	Jamie Bishop	3	0	3	0	0	0	0	0	0	0
	MF	(Scotland) SCO	Shuan Robertson	4	0	4	0	0	0	0	0	0	0
	MF	(Scotland) SCO	Darren Kelly	1	0	1	0	0	0	0	0	0	0
	MF	(Scotland) SCO	Graham Webster	7	1	7	1	0	0	0	0	0	0
	FW	(Scotland) SCO	Martin Bavidge	37	10	31	8	3	2	1	0	2	0
	FW	(Scotland) SCO	Peter Bruce	0	0	0	0	0	0	0	0	0	0
	FW	(Scotland) SCO	Bryan Deasley	35	5	29	4	3	0	1	0	2	1
	FW	(Scotland) SCO	Rory McAllister	40	22	34	20	3	0	1	0	2	2
	FW	(Scotland) SCO	Dave Ross	27	1	23	1	3	0	0	0	1	0
	FW	(Scotland) SCO	Dennis Wyness	33	1	29	1	3	0	1	0	0	0
	FW	(Scotland) SCO	Gary Wood	5	0	4	0	1	0	0	0	0	0

=== Disciplinary record ===
Includes all competitive matches.

Last updated 5 May 2012

Nation	Position	Name	Third Division		Scottish Cup		League Cup		Challenge Cup		Total	
Nation	Position	Name	Booked	Sent off (straight red)	Booked	Sent off (straight red)	Booked	Sent off (straight red)	Booked	Sent off (straight red)	Booked	Sent off (straight red)
(Scotland)	GK	Neil Duffy	0	0	0	0	0	0	1	0	1	0
(Scotland)	GK	Paul Jarvie	0	0	0	0	0	0	0	0	0	0
(Scotland)	GK	Raymond Jellema	0	0	0	0	0	0	0	0	0	0
(Scotland)	DF	David Donald	2	0	0	0	0	0	0	0	2	0
(Scotland)	DF	Callum MacDonald	5	1	1	0	0	0	1	0	7	1
(Scotland)	DF	Paul Watson	1	0	0	0	1	0	1	0	3	0
(Scotland)	DF	Alan Rattray	5	0	0	0	0	0	0	0	5	0
(Scotland)	DF	Scott Ross	10	0	1	0	0	0	0	0	11	0
(Scotland)	DF	Lewis Davidson	1	0	0	0	0	0	0	0	1	0
(Scotland)	DF	Ryan Strachan	8	0	1	0	0	0	0	0	9	0
(Scotland)	DF	Craig Tully	4	0	0	0	0	0	0	0	4	0
(Scotland)	DF	Ross Smith	1	0	0	0	0	0	0	0	1	0
(Scotland)	MF	Nicky Clark	0	0	0	0	0	0	0	0	0	0
(Scotland)	MF	Aaron Conway	1	0	0	0	0	0	0	0	1	0
(Scotland)	MF	Russell Duncan	0	0	0	0	0	0	0	0	0	0
(Scotland)	MF	Roy McBain	6	0	1	0	0	0	1	0	8	0
(Scotland)	MF	Jamie Redman	5	0	0	0	0	0	1	0	6	0
(Scotland)	MF	Barry Sellars	1	0	0	0	0	0	0	0	1	0
(Scotland)	MF	Graeme Sharp	3	0	0	0	0	0	0	0	3	0
(Scotland)	MF	Paul Young	0	0	0	0	0	0	0	0	0	0
(Scotland)	MF	Shuan Robertson	0	0	0	0	0	0	0	0	0	0
(Scotland)	MF	Darren Kelly	0	0	0	0	0	0	0	0	0	0
(Scotland)	MF	Graham Webster	1	0	0	0	0	0	0	0	1	0
(Scotland)	FW	Martin Bavidge	2	0	0	0	0	0	0	0	2	0
(Scotland)	FW	Peter Bruce	0	0	0	0	0	0	0	0	0	0
(Scotland)	FW	Bryan Deasley	5	0	0	0	0	0	0	0	5	0
(Scotland)	FW	Rory McAllister	13	1	1	0	0	0	0	0	14	1
(Scotland)	FW	Dave Ross	0	0	0	0	0	0	0	0	0	0
(Scotland)	FW	Dennis Wyness	1	0	0	0	0	0	0	0	1	0
(Scotland)	FW	Gary Wood	1	0	1	0	0	0	0	0	2	0

=== Awards ===
Last updated 14 May 2012

Nation	Name	Award	Month
(Scotland)	Jim McInally	Third Division Manager of the Month	April

== League table ==
Pos	Team	Pld	W	D	L	GF	GA	GD	Pts	Promotion or qualification
3	Stranraer (P)	36	17	7	12	77	57	+20	58 (Note: Stranraer advanced to the final of the Second Division play-offs but were defeated by Albion Rovers, who retained their place in the Second Division. However, following the demotion of Rangers to the Third Division, Dundee were promoted from the First Division to the SPL, Airdrie United promoted from the Second to the First Division, and Stranraer were promoted from the Third to the Second Division.)	Qualification for the Second Division Play-offs
4	Elgin City	36	16	9	11	68	60	+8	57	Qualification for the Second Division Play-offs
5	Peterhead	36	15	6	15	51	53	−2	51	
6	Annan Athletic	36	13	10	13	53	53	0	49	
7	Berwick Rangers	36	12	12	12	61	58	+3	48	

Source: SPFL Archive
Rules for classification: 1) points; 2) goal difference; 3) number of goals scored.
(P) Promoted

== Transfers ==
=== Players in ===
Player	From	Fee
(Scotland) Jamie Redman	(Scotland) Brechin City	Free
(Scotland) Aaron Conway	(Scotland) Livingston	Free
(Scotland) Paul Watson	(Scotland) Forfar Athletic	Free
(Scotland) Roy McBain	(Scotland) Inverness Caledonian Thistle	Free
(Scotland) Barry Sellars	(Scotland) Forfar Athletic	Free
(Scotland) Brian Deasley	(Scotland) Forfar Athletic	Free
(Scotland) Neil Duffy	(Scotland) St Johnstone	Free
(Scotland) Raymond Jellema	Unattached	Free
(Scotland) Alan Rattray	(Scotland) Arbroath	Free
(Scotland) Rory McAllister	(Scotland) Brechin City	Free
(Scotland) Scott Ross	(Scotland) Aberdeen	Loan
(Scotland) Lewis Davidson	(Scotland) Aberdeen	Free
(Scotland) Garry Wood	(Scotland) Ross County	Loan
(Scotland) Jamie Bishop	(Scotland) Forfar Athletic	Loan
(Scotland) Graham Webster	(Scotland) Dundee	Loan
(Scotland) Ross Smith	(Scotland) Dundee United	Loan
(Scotland) Russell Duncan	(Scotland) Ross County	Loan

=== Players out ===
Player	To	Fee
(Scotland) Bobby Mann	(Scotland) Formartine United	Free
(Scotland) Neil McVitie	(Scotland) Formartine United	Free
(Scotland) Stuart Smith	(Scotland) Formartine United	Free
(Scotland) Daniel Moore	(Scotland) Elgin City	Free
(Scotland) Nicky Clark	(Scotland) Queen of the South	Free
(Scotland) Connor Gethins	(Scotland) Nairn County	Free
(Scotland) Peter-Alexander Bruce	(Scotland) Fraserburgh	Loan
(Scotland) Paul Young	(Scotland) Turriff United	Loan
(Scotland) Jonathan Bateman	(England) Wolverhampton Sporting Community	Free
(Scotland) Paul Emslie	(Scotland) Cove Rangers	Free
(Scotland) Aaron Conway	(Scotland) Montrose Roselea	Loan
(Scotland) Barry Sellars	(Scotland) Peterhead	Free
(Scotland) Aaron Conway	(Scotland) Dundee Violet	Loan
(Scotland) Paul Watson	(Scotland) St Andrews United	Loan
(Scotland) Alan Rattray	(Scotland) St Andrews United	Loan

== See also ==
- List of Peterhead F.C. seasons
