= Calum MacDonald =

Calum or Callum MacDonald is the name of:

- Callum Macdonald (1912–1999), Scottish publisher
- Callum MacDonald (born 1983), Scottish footballer
- Calum Macdonald (footballer) (born 1997), English-born Scottish footballer for Tranmere Rovers
- Calum MacDonald (musician) (born 1953), Scottish musician in the band Runrig
- Calum MacDonald (politician) (born 1956), Scottish politician, Labour MP for the Western Isles, 1987–2005
- Malcolm MacDonald (music critic) (1948–2014), alias Calum MacDonald, Scottish author
- Malky MacDonald (1913–1999), alias Calum MacDonald, football player and manager
