= List of Scottish Professional Football League hat-tricks =

List of hat-tricks scored in the SPFL

The Scottish Professional Football League (SPFL) consists of four divisions; Scottish Premiership, Scottish Championship, Scottish League One and Scottish League Two. The league structure was established in 2013 after the merger of the Scottish Premier League (SPL) and the Scottish Football League (SFL).

== Scottish Premiership ==
=== Hat-tricks ===
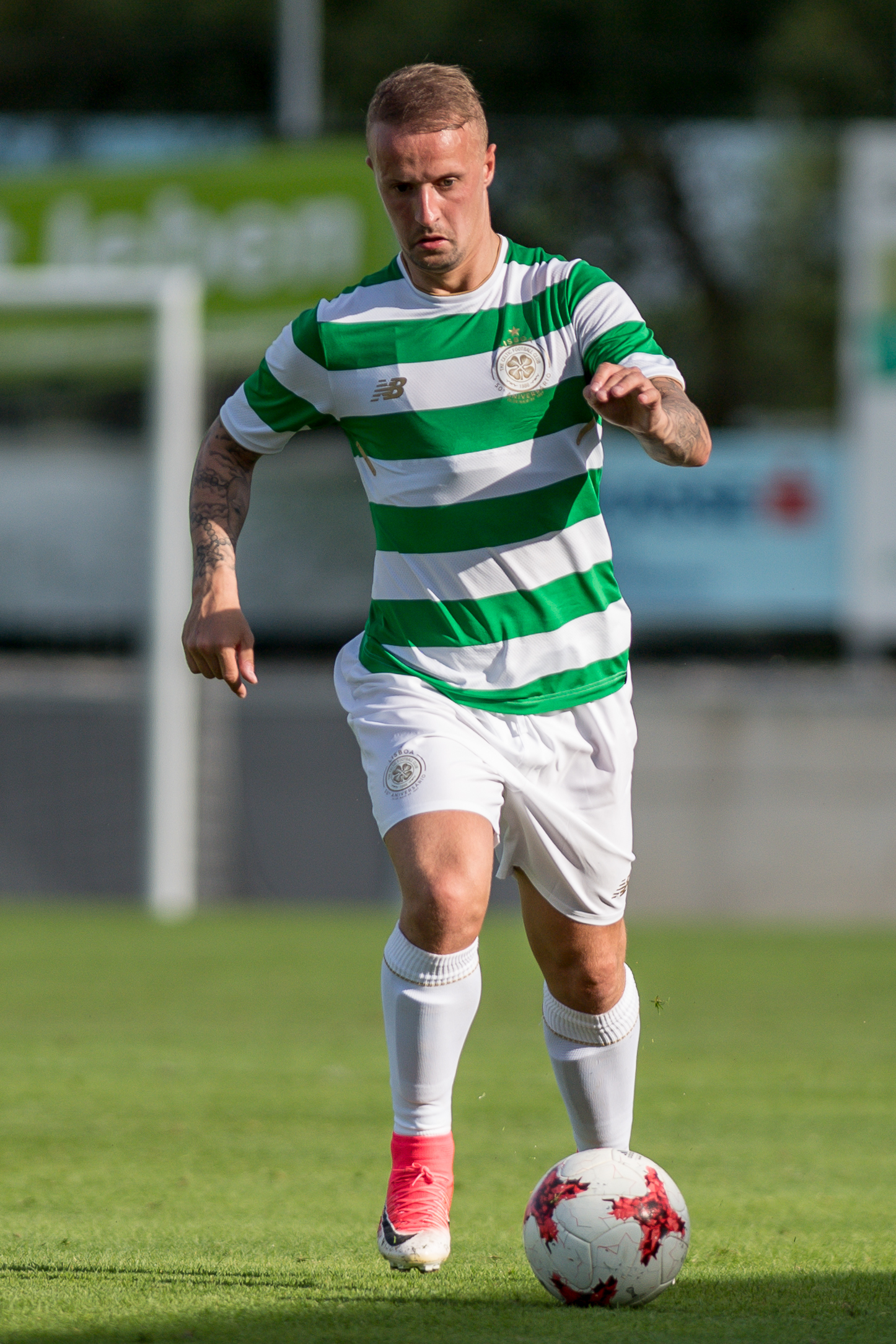
Leigh Griffiths has scored the most hat-tricks in the Scottish Premiership, netting five for Celtic.

As of 9 August 2026

Key
^{4}	Player scored four goals
^{5}	Player scored five goals
*	The home team

No.	Player	Nationality	For	Against	Result^{[e]}	Date	Ref.
1	Georgios Samaras	Greece	Celtic	Kilmarnock*	2–5	23 September 2013	
2	Stevie May	Scotland	St Johnstone*	Dundee United	3–0	29 December 2013	
3	Stevie May	Scotland	St Johnstone*	Heart of Midltohian	3–3	18 January 2014	
4	Anthony Stokes	Ireland	Celtic*	St Johnstone	3–0	16 February 2014	
5	Leigh Griffiths	Scotland	Celtic*	Inverness Caledonian Thistle	5–0	1 March 2014	
6	Kris Commons	Scotland	Celtic	Kilmarnock*	0–3	14 March 2014	
7	Anthony Stokes	Ireland	Celtic*	Inverness Caledonian Thistle	6–0	27 April 2014	
8	Ryan Stevenson	Scotland	Heart of Midlothian*	Kilmarnock	5–0	4 May 2014	
9	Scott Vernon	England	Aberdeen	Dundee United*	1–3	6 May 2014	
10	Kris Doolan^{4}	Scotland	Partick Thistle*	Hamilton Academical	5–0	21 January 2015	
11	Liam Boyce	Northern Ireland	Ross County	St Mirren*	0–3	13 April 2015	
12	Leigh Griffiths	Scotland	Celtic*	Kilmarnock	4–1	15 April 2015	
13	Leigh Griffiths	Scotland	Celtic	Dundee United*	0–3	26 April 2015	
14	Steven MacLean	Scotland	St Johnstone*	Hamilton Academical	4–1	12 September 2015	
15	Kane Hemmings	England	Dundee*	Hamilton Academical	4–0	19 December 2015	
16	Liam Boyce	Northern Ireland	Ross County*	Dundee	5–2	26 December 2015	
17	Leigh Griffiths	Scotland	Celtic*	Hamilton Academical	8–1	19 January 2016	
18	Liam Boyce	Northern Ireland	Ross County	Inverness Caledonian Thistle*	2–3	13 August 2016	
19	Moussa Dembélé	France	Celtic*	Rangers	5–1	10 September 2016	
20	Louis Moult^{4}	England	Motherwell*	Hamilton Academical	4–2	17 September 2016	
21	Moussa Dembélé	France	Celtic	St Johnstone*	2–5	5 February 2017	
22	Adam Rooney	Ireland	Aberdeen*	Motherwell	7–2	15 February 2017	
23	Andrew Considine	Scotland	Aberdeen	Dundee*	0–7	31 March 2017	
24	Scott Sinclair	England	Celtic	Heart of Midlothian*	0–5	2 April 2017	
25	Liam Boyce^{4}	Northern Ireland	Ross County*	Inverness Caledonian Thistle	4–0	28 April 2017	
26	Scott Wright	Scotland	Aberdeen	Partick Thistle*	0–6	21 May 2017	
27	Adam Rooney	Ireland	Aberdeen*	St Johnstone	3–0	30 September 2017	
28	Odsonne Édouard	France	Celtic*	Motherwell	5–1	2 December 2017	
29	Gary Mackay-Steven	Scotland	Aberdeen*	Hibernian	4–1	16 December 2017	
30	Josh Windass	England	Rangers	Hamilton Academical*	3–5	18 February 2018	
31	Alex Schalk	Netherlands	Ross County*	Partick Thistle	4–0	3 April 2018	
32	Florian Kamberi	Switzerland	Hibernian*	Hamilton Academical	3–1	3 April 2018	
33	Steven MacLean	Scotland	St Johnstone	Motherwell*	1–5	5 May 2018	
34	Jamie Maclaren	Australia	Hibernian*	Rangers	5–5	13 May 2018	
35	Steven Naismith	Scotland	Heart of Midlothian*	St Mirren	4–1	1 September 2018	
36	James Forrest^{4}	Scotland	Celtic	St Johnstone*	0–6	7 October 2018	
37	Kenny Miller	Scotland	Dundee*	Hamilton Academical	4–0	5 December 2018	
38	Scott Sinclair	England	Celtic	Aberdeen*	3–4	26 December 2018	
39	Scott Arfield	Canada	Rangers	Motherwell*	0–3	7 April 2019	
40	Cody Cooke	England	St Mirren	Dundee*	2–3	18 May 2019	
41	Ryan Christie	Scotland	Celtic*	St Johnstone	7–0	3 August 2019	
42	Jermain Defoe	England	Rangers*	Hibernian	6–1	11 August 2019	
43	Jermain Defoe	England	Rangers*	Hamilton Academical	5–0	6 October 2019	
44	Christian Doidge	Wales	Hibernian	St Johnstone*	1–4	9 November 2019	
45	Lyndon Dykes	Scotland	Livingston*	Ross County	4–0	21 December 2019	
46	Leigh Griffiths	Scotland	Celtic*	St Mirren	5–0	7 March 2020	
47	Odsonne Édouard	France	Celtic*	Hamilton Academical	5–1	2 August 2020	
48	Kevin Nisbet	Scotland	Hibernian	Livingston*	1–4	8 August 2020	
49	Mohamed Elyounoussi	Norway	Celtic	Motherwell*	1–4	8 November 2020	
50	Kyle Lafferty	Northern Ireland	Kilmarnock*	Dundee United	3–0	21 April 2021	
51	Kyōgo Furuhashi	Japan	Celtic*	Dundee	6–0	8 August 2021	
52	David Turnbull	Scotland	Celtic*	St Mirren	6–0	21 August 2021	
53	Fashion Sakala	Zambia	Rangers	Motherwell*	1–6	31 October 2021	
54	Giorgos Giakoumakis	Greece	Celtic*	Dundee	3–2	20 February 2022	
55	Giorgos Giakoumakis	Greece	Celtic*	Ross County	4–0	19 March 2022	
56	Kemar Roofe	Jamaica	Rangers	St Mirren*	1–4	10 April 2022	
57	James Scott	Scotland	Hibernian*	St Johnstone	4–0	15 May 2022	
58	Kyōgo Furuhashi	Japan	Celtic	Dundee United*	0–9	28 August 2022	
59	Liel Abada	Israel	Celtic	Dundee United*	0–9	28 August 2022	
60	Kevin van Veen	Netherlands	Motherwell	Ross County*	0–5	4 October 2022	
61	James Forrest	Scotland	Celtic*	Hibernian	6–1	15 October 2022	
62	Lawrence Shankland	Scotland	Heart of Midlothian*	Celtic	3–4	22 October 2022	
63	Kevin Nisbet	Scotland	Hibernian	Motherwell*	2–3	8 January 2023	
64	Josh Campbell	Scotland	Hibernian*	Aberdeen	6–0	28 January 2023	
65	Lawrence Shankland	Scotland	Heart of Midlothian*	Ross County	6–1	22 April 2023	
66	Jordan White	Scotland	Ross County	Dundee United*	1–3	13 May 2023	
67	Hamza Igamane	Morocco	Rangers	Hibernian*	3–3	5 January 2025	
68	Barney Stewart	Scotland	Falkirk*	Hibernian	4–1	24 January 2026	
69	Tyreece John-Jules	England	Kilmarnock*	St Mirren	4–3	11 February 2026	
70	Youssef Chermiti	Portugal	Rangers*	Heart of Midlothian	4–2	15 February 2026	
71	Youssef Chermiti	Portugal	Rangers	Falkirk*	2–5	16 May 2026	
72	Kasper Høgh	Denmark	Celtic	Kilmarnock*	1–5	9 August 2026	

=== Multiple hat-tricks ===
Rank	Player	Hat-tricks
1	(Scotland) Leigh Griffiths	5
2	(Northern Ireland) Liam Boyce	4
3	(Portugal) Youssef Chermiti	2
3	(England) Jermain Defoe	2
3	(France) Moussa Dembélé	2
3	(Scotland) James Forrest	2
3	(Japan) Kyōgo Furuhashi	2
3	(Greece) Giorgos Giakoumakis	2
3	(Scotland) Steven MacLean	2
3	(Scotland) Stevie May	2
3	(Scotland) Kevin Nisbet	2
3	(Republic of Ireland) Adam Rooney	2
3	(Scotland) Lawrence Shankland	2
3	(England) Scott Sinclair	2
3	(Republic of Ireland) Anthony Stokes	2

== Scottish Championship ==
James Keatings became the first player for 43 years to score hat-tricks for both Edinburgh clubs Heart of Midlothian (in 2014) and Hibernian (in 2015). Género Zeefuik of Heart of Midlothian scored a hat-trick in a 10–0 SPFL record win against Cowdenbeath (who also suffered a joint-club record defeat) on 28 February 2015. The three-minute Zeefuik hat-trick equalled the fastest ever hat-trick scored by a Heart of Midlothian player (Andy Black in 1938) in this match too. Kenny Miller became the oldest ever Rangers player to score a hat-trick, with three goals against Dumbarton on 2 January 2016. Mickaël Antoine-Curier and Tony Andreu both scored hat-tricks for Hamilton Academical in the same match, as the club equalled an 82-year-old club record scoreline by beating Greenock Morton 10–2 on the last day of the 2013–14 season.

=== Hat-tricks ===
As of 7 November 2026

Key
^{4}	Player scored four goals
^{5}	Player scored five goals
*	The home team

No.	Player	Nationality	For	Against	Result^{[e]}	Date	Ref.
1	Greig Spence	Scotland	Raith Rovers	Cowdenbeath*	3–4	17 August 2013	
2	Philip Roberts	Ireland	Falkirk	Livingston*	0–3	24 August 2013	
3	Callum Fordyce	Scotland	Livingston*	Cowdenbeath	5–1	28 September 2013	
4	Kane Hemmings	England	Cowdenbeath*	Greenock Morton	5–1	9 October 2013	
5	Mark McNulty	Scotland	Livingston	Greenock Morton*	1–5	23 November 2013	
6	Rory Loy	Scotland	Falkirk*	Cowdenbeath	5–0	5 April 2014	
7	Mickaël Antoine-Curier^{4}	France	Hamilton Academical*	Greenock Morton	10–2	3 May 2014	
8	Tony Andreu	France	Hamilton Academical*	Greenock Morton	10–2	3 May 2014	
9	James Keatings	Scotland	Heart of Midlothian	Raith Rovers*	0–4	23 August 2014	
10	Jordan White	Scotland	Livingston*	Alloa Athletic	4–0	13 September 2014	
11	Dominique Malonga	Republic of the Congo	Hibernian	Dumbarton*	3–6	22 November 2014	
12	Derek Lyle	Scotland	Queen of the South	Cowdenbeath*	0–5	31 January 2015	
13	Género Zeefuik	Netherlands	Heart of Midlothian*	Cowdenbeath	10–0	28 February 2015	
14	Colin Nish	Scotland	Cowdenbeath	Raith Rovers*	1–3	8 April 2015	
15	Martyn Waghorn	England	Rangers	Greenock Morton*	0–4	27 September 2015	
16	John Baird	Scotland	Falkirk	Dumbarton*	0–5	24 October 2015	
17	James Keatings	Scotland	Hibernian	St Mirren*	1–4	7 November 2015	
18	John Baird	Scotland	Falkirk*	Alloa Athletic	5–0	14 November 2015	
19	Kenny Miller	Scotland	Rangers	Dumbarton*	0–6	2 January 2016	
20	Martyn Waghorn	England	Rangers*	Livingston	4–1	16 January 2016	
21	Ryan Hardie	Scotland	Raith Rovers*	St Mirren	4–3	5 March 2016	
22	Christian Nade	France	Dumbarton*	Alloa Athletic	3–1	8 March 2016	
23	Joe Cardle	England	Dunfermline Athletic*	Dumbarton	4–3	6 August 2016	
24	Alan Forrest	Scotland	Ayr United	Dumbarton*	0–3	15 October 2016	
25	Nicky Clark^{4}	Scotland	Dunfermline Athletic*	Dumbarton	5–1	4 March 2017	
26	Stephen Dobbie	Scotland	Queen of the South	Falkirk*	1–4	26 August 2017	
27	Stephen Dobbie	Scotland	Queen of the South	Dunfermline Athletic*	2–5	9 December 2017	
28	Stephen Dobbie	Scotland	Queen of the South*	Brechin City	3–1	27 January 2018	
29	Nicky Clark	Scotland	Dunfermline Athletic	Brechin City*	0–3	20 March 2018	
30	Nicky Clark	Scotland	Dunfermline Athletic*	Queen of the South	3–1	31 March 2018	
31	Nathan Austin	Scotland	Inverness Caledonian Thistle*	Dumbarton	5–1	14 April 2018	
32	Stephen Dobbie	Scotland	Queen of the South	Falkirk*	0–3	25 August 2018	
33	Stephen Dobbie^{4}	Scotland	Queen of the South*	Ayr United	5–0	1 September 2018	
34	Billy McKay	Northern Ireland	Ross County	Dundee United*	1–5	29 September 2018	
35	Stephen Dobbie	Scotland	Queen of the South*	Alloa Athletic	3–3	6 October 2018	
36	Billy McKay	Northern Ireland	Ross County*	Greenock Morton	5–0	27 October 2018	
37	Lawrence Shankland^{4}	Scotland	Ayr United	Dundee United*	0–5	30 November 2018	
38	Billy McKay	Northern Ireland	Ross County*	Ayr United	3–2	26 February 2019	
39	Brian Graham	Scotland	Ross County	Ayr United*	1–3	19 April 2019	
40	Lawrence Shankland^{4}	Scotland	Dundee United*	Inverness Caledonian Thistle	4–1	3 August 2019	
41	Bob McHugh	Scotland	Greenock Morton*	Alloa Athletic	4–1	10 August 2019	
42	Lawrence Shankland	Scotland	Dundee United*	Greenock Morton	6–0	28 September 2019	
43	Kevin Nisbet^{4}	Scotland	Dunfermline Athletic*	Partick Thistle	5–1	30 November 2019	
44	Lawrence Shankland	Scotland	Dundee United	Partick Thistle*	1–4	11 January 2020	
45	Kevin O'Hara	Scotland	Dunfermline Athletic	Alloa Athletic*	1–4	24 October 2020	
46	Osman Sow	Sweden	Dundee	Queen of the South*	1–3	26 December 2020	
47	Steven Naismith	Scotland	Heart of Midlothian*	Arbroath	3–1	29 December 2020	
48	Liam Boyce	Northern Ireland	Heart of Midlothian*	Alloa Athletic	6–0	9 April 2021	
49	Brian Graham	Scotland	Partick Thistle	Inverness Caledonian Thistle*	3–3	9 February 2022	
50	Dipo Akinyemi	England	Ayr United*	Queen's Park	5–0	8 October 2022	
51	Billy Mckay	Northern Ireland	Inverness Caledonian Thistle*	Cove Rangers	6–1	2 January 2023	
52	Simon Murray^{4}	Scotland	Queen's Park	Cove Rangers*	0–6	7 January 2023	
53	Lyall Cameron	Scotland	Dundee*	Hamilton Academical	7–0	1 April 2023	
54	Kevin Holt	Scotland	Dundee United	Partick Thistle*	0–5	21 October 2023	
55	Lewis Vaughan	Scotland	Raith Rovers*	Ayr United	4–4	22 December 2023	
56	Tony Watt	Scotland	Dundee United*	Partick Thistle	3–0	29 December 2023	
57	Robbie Muirhead	Scotland	Greenock Morton*	Ayr United	3–0	2 January 2024	
58	George Oakley	England	Greenock Morton	Dundee United*	2–3	6 January 2024	
59	Alex Samuel	Wales	Inverness Caledonian Thistle	Raith Rovers*	2–3	27 January 2024	
60	Anton Dowds	Scotland	Ayr United	Airdrieonians*	2–3	17 February 2024	
61	Oli Shaw	Scotland	Hamilton Academical*	Greenock Morton	3–0	26 October 2024	
62	George Oakley	England	Ayr United*	Raith Rovers	3–0	4 January 2025	
63	Scott Arfield	Canada	Falkirk*	Partick Thistle	5–2	8 February 2025	
64	Josh McPake	Scotland	St Johnstone*	Partick Thistle	5–1	2 August 2025	
65	Andrew Tod	Scotland	Dunfermline Athletic	Arbroath*	0–5	13 September 2025	
66	Adama Sidibeh	Gambia	St Johnstone*	Airdrieonians	3–0	1 November 2025	
67	Jack Hamilton	Scotland	Raith Rovers*	Queens Park	4–1	24 January 2026	
68	Euan Henderson	Scotland	Partick Thistle*	Stenhousemuir	3–0	24 October 2026	
69	George Oakley	England	Raith Rovers	Arbroath	0–4	31 October 2026	
70	Dylan Borso^{4}	United States	Greenock Morton*	Stenhousemuir	4–3	7 November 2026	

=== Multiple hat-tricks ===
Rank	Player	Hat-tricks
1	(Scotland) Stephen Dobbie	6
2	(Scotland) Lawrence Shankland	4
3	(Scotland) Nicky Clark	3
3	(Northern Ireland) Billy McKay	3
5	(Scotland) James Keatings	2
5	(Scotland) John Baird	2
5	(England) Martyn Waghorn	2
5	(Scotland) Brian Graham	2
5	(England) George Oakley	2

== Scottish League One ==
=== Hat-tricks ===
As of 7 November 2026

Key
^{4}	Player scored four goals
^{5}	Player scored five goals
*	The home team

No.	Player	Nationality	For	Against	Result^{[e]}	Date	Ref.
1	Lee McCulloch	Scotland	Rangers*	East Fife	5–0	31 August 2013	
2	Lee McCulloch	Scotland	Rangers*	Arbroath	5–1	14 September 2013	
3	Jon Daly	Ireland	Rangers*	Stenhousemuir	8–0	28 September 2013	
4	Jon Daly	Ireland	Rangers	East Fife*	0–4	26 October 2013	
5	Michael Moffat	Scotland	Stranraer	Ayr United*	3–6	12 November 2013	
6	Jamie Longworth	Scotland	Ayr United*	Stranraer	3–6	12 November 2013	
7	Nicky Clark	Scotland	Rangers*	Forfar Athletic	6–1	3 December 2013	
8	Martin Grehan	Scotland	Stranraer	Brechin City*	1–3	22 February 2014	
9	Lee McCulloch	Scotland	Rangers*	Airdrieonians	3–0	12 March 2014	
10	Craig Malcolm	Scotland	Ayr United*	East Fife	4–1	3 May 2014	
11	Gozie Ugwu	England	Dunfermline Athletic*	Stirling Albion	4–0	22 November 2014	
12	Colin McMenamin	Scotland	Stenhousemuir	Ayr United*	2–3	13 December 2014	
13	Stefan McCluskey	Scotland	Greenock Morton*	Stirling Albion	4–0	3 March 2015	
14	Joe Cardle	England	Dunfermline Athletic	Forfar Athletic*	0–4	5 September 2015	
15	Rory McAllister	Scotland	Peterhead	Stenhousemuir*	4–3	31 October 2015	
16	Leighton McIntosh	Scotland	Peterhead*	Cowdenbeath	7–0	21 November 2015	
17	Jordan Preston	Scotland	Ayr United	Albion Rovers*	1–3	23 January 2016	
18	Joe Cardle	England	Dunfermline Athletic*	Stranraer	6–1	27 February 2016	
19	Rory McAllister	Scotland	Peterhead*	Brechin City	4–1	27 February 2016	
20	Faissal El Bakhtaoui	France	Dunfermline Athletic*	Brechin City	3–1	26 March 2016	
21	Robert Thomson	Scotland	Brechin City*	Peterhead	5–1	16 April 2016	
22	Iain Russell	Scotland	Airdrieonians*	Queen's Park	4–1	22 October 2016	
23	Ross Caldwell	Scotland	Brechin City	Peterhead*	1–3	5 November 2016	
24	Andy Ryan	Scotland	Airdrieonians	East Fife*	0–4	29 April 2017	
25	Craig Moore	Scotland	Ayr United	Albion Rovers*	1–5	5 August 2017	
26	Scott Agnew	Scotland	Stranraer	Albion Rovers*	0–4	16 September 2017	
27	Ryan McCord	Scotland	Arbroath	Stranraer*	2–6	23 September 2017	
28	Michael Moffat	Scotland	Ayr United	Forfar Athletic*	0–5	21 October 2017	
29	Ross C. Stewart	Scotland	Alloa Athletic*	Arbroath*	5–3	6 March 2018	
30	Lawrence Shankland	Scotland	Ayr United*	Queen's Park	4–0	24 March 2018	
31	Liam Buchanan	Scotland	Raith Rovers	Airdrieonians*	3–4	25 August 2018	
32	Bobby Linn	Scotland	Arbroath*	Forfar Athletic	3–1	15 September 2018	
33	Bobby Linn	Scotland	Arbroath	Forfar Athletic*	2–3	8 December 2018	
34	Bobby Linn	Scotland	Arbroath*	Airdrieonians	3–2	23 February 2019	
35	Dom Thomas	Scotland	Dumbarton	East Fife*	3–4	23 February 2019	
36	Leighton McIntosh	Scotland	Airdrieonians	Stranraer*	1–4	4 May 2019	
37	Declan McManus	Scotland	Falkirk*	Dumbarton	6–0	10 August 2019	
38	David Goodwillie^{5}	Scotland	Clyde*	Stranraer	6–1	14 September 2019	
39	David Goodwillie	Scotland	Clyde*	Stranraer	3–3	4 January 2020	
40	Declan McManus	Scotland	Falkirk	Peterhead*	1–3	11 January 2020	
41	David Goodwillie	Scotland	Clyde*	Montrose	3–2	21 November 2020	
42	Mitchell Megginson	Scotland	Cove Rangers*	East Fife	5–2	14 August 2021	
43	Rory McAllister	Scotland	Cove Rangers	Alloa Athletic*	1–3	2 October 2021	
44	Anton Dowds	Scotland	Falkirk*	Dumbarton	6–2	8 January 2022	
45	Euan Henderson^{4}	Scotland	Alloa Athletic*	Montrose	4–1	30 April 2022	
46	Lewis Jamieson	Scotland	Airdrieonians*	Montrose	4–0	29 October 2022	
47	Ryan Shanley	Scotland	Edinburgh*	Alloa Athletic	4–3	19 November 2022	
48	Craig McGuffie	Scotland	Falkirk*	Peterhead	5–0	4 March 2023	
49	Gabby McGill	England	Airdrieonians*	Kelty Hearts	6–1	11 March 2023	
50	Calum Gallagher	Scotland	Airdrieonians*	Peterhead	7–0	18 March 2023	
51	Kevin O'Hara (footballer)	Scotland	Hamilton Academical*	Stirling Albion	5–0	11 November 2023	
52	Rumarn Burrell	England	Cove Rangers*	Stirling Albion	3–1	18 November 2023	
53	Rumarn Burrell	England	Cove Rangers	Annan Athletic*	1–3	9 December 2023	
54	Josh Cooper	Scotland	Stirling Albion*	Kelty Hearts	5–0	27 January 2024	
55	Alfie Bavidge	Scotland	Kelty Hearts	Edinburgh City*	0–3	3 February 2024	
56	Ahkeem Rose	Jamaica	Hamilton Academical	Kelty Hearts*	0–5	2 March 2024	
57	Callumn Morrison^{4}	Scotland	Falkirk*	Edinburgh City	4–1	23 March 2024	
58	Blair Alston	Scotland	Stenhousemuir*	Annan Athletic	5–1	31 August 2024	
59	Matty Yates	Scotland	Stenhousemuir*	Dumbarton	4–0	7 December 2024	
60	Corey O'Donnell	Scotland	Stenhousemuir	Dumbarton*	1–2	1 March 2025	
61	Keith Bray	Scotland	Inverness Caledonian Thistle	Cove Rangers*	0–3	5 April 2025	
62	David Eguaibor	Ireland	Cove Rangers*	Montrose	3–3	16 August 2025	
63	Matthew Douglas	England	Queen of the South*	Hamilton Academical	4–1	27 December 2025	
64	Taylor Sutherland	Scotland	Montrose	East Fife*	2–3	31 January 2026	
65	Callum Burnside	Northern Ireland	Alloa Athletic	Montrose*	5–4	14 March 2026	
66	Kyle MacDonald	Scotland	Hamilton Academical*	Airdrieonians	4–0	15 August 2026	
67	Cameron Elliot	Scotland	East Kilbride*	Peterhead	3–1	12 September 2026	
68	Andy Ryan	Scotland	Hamilton Academical*	Queen of the South	4–1	19 September 2026	
69	Cameron Elliot	Scotland	East Kilbride	East Fife*	0–3	3 October 2026	
70	Brian Graham	Scotland	Ross County*	Airdrieonians	4–0	24 October 2026	
71	Edimond Oppong	Italy	Cove Rangers*	Hamilton Academical	4–0	7 November 2026	

=== Multiple hat-tricks ===
Rank	Player	Hat-tricks
1	(Scotland) Lee McCulloch	3
1	(Scotland) Bobby Linn	3
1	(Scotland) David Goodwillie	3
1	(Scotland) Rory McAllister	3
5	(England) Joe Cardle	2
5	(Republic of Ireland) Jon Daly	2
5	(Scotland) Michael Moffat	2
5	(Scotland) Leighton McIntosh	2
5	(England) Rumarn Burrell	2

== Scottish League Two ==
Elgin City's Darryl McHardy and Annan Athletic's Peter Weatherson both scored hat-tricks in the same match in a 5–4 win for Annan Athletic at Elgin City on 25 April 2015. It was also the first hat-trick of McHardy's career.

=== Hat-tricks ===
As of 31 October 2026

Key
^{4}	Player scored four goals
^{5}	Player scored five goals
*	The home team

No.	Player	Nationality	For	Against	Result^{[e]}	Date	Ref.
1	Scott Dalziel	Scotland	Berwick Rangers	Queen's Park*	0–4	21 December 2013	
2	Rory McAllister	Scotland	Peterhead*	Stirling Albion	3–1	21 December 2013	
3	Jordan White	Scotland	Stirling Albion*	Clyde	4–1	3 May 2014	
4	Simon Murray	Scotland	Arbroath	East Fife*	1–5	27 December 2014	
5	Peter Weatherson	England	Annan Athletic	East Stirlingshire*	1–3	17 January 2015	
6	Nathan Austin	Scotland	East Fife	Elgin City*	3–5	3 March 2015	
7	Bobby Linn	Scotland	Arbroath*	Clyde	3–1	14 March 2015	
8	Craig Gunn	Scotland	Elgin City*	Berwick Rangers	3–3	31 March 2015	
9	Darryl McHardy	Scotland	Elgin City*	Annan Athletic	4–5	25 April 2015	
10	Peter Weatherson	England	Annan Athletic	Elgin City*	4–5	25 April 2015	
11	Nathan Austin	England	East Fife	Montrose*	1–4	26 September 2015	
12	David Gormley^{4}	Scotland	Clyde	Berwick Rangers*	0–5	21 November 2015	
13	Darren Smith	Scotland	Stirling Albion	Montrose*	1–3	12 December 2015	
14	Nathan Austin	England	East Fife	Stirling Albion*	1–3	26 December 2015	
15	Darren Smith	Scotland	Stirling Albion*	Montrose	7–0	9 February 2016	
16	Bobby Linn	Scotland	Arbroath*	Stirling Albion	5–3	27 August 2016	
17	Shane Sutherland	Scotland	Elgin City*	Berwick Rangers	6–0	10 December 2016	
18	Shane Sutherland	Scotland	Elgin City*	Edinburgh City	3–1	28 January 2017	
19	Steven Thomson	Scotland	Berwick Rangers*	Annan Athletic	4–1	4 February 2017	
20	Steven Doris	Scotland	Arbroath	Annan Athletic*	2–5	1 April 2017	
21	David Goodwillie	Scotland	Clyde*	Elgin City	3–2	15 April 2017	
22	Ryan McCord	Scotland	Arbroath*	Elgin City	3–2	29 April 2017	
23	Blair Henderson	Scotland	Annan Athletic	Stenhousemuir*	1–3	9 December 2017	
24	Russell McLean	Scotland	Peterhead	Annan Athletic*	3–3	20 February 2017	
25	Lewis Milne	Scotland	Montrose	Stirling Albion*	0–5	7 April 2018	
26	Blair Henderson	Scotland	Annan Athletic*	Stirling Albion	3–1	21 April 2018	
27	Blair Henderson	Scotland	Edinburgh City*	Albion Rovers	4–0	4 August 2018	
28	Blair Henderson	Scotland	Edinburgh City*	Elgin City	4–1	15 December 2018	
29	Peter MacDonald	Scotland	Stirling Albion	Albion Rovers*	0–5	26 January 2019	
30	Darryl McHardy	Scotland	Elgin City	Albion Rovers*	0–3	9 February 2019	
31	David Galt	Scotland	Queen's Park*	Elgin City	4–1	16 March 2019	
32	Jordan Allan	Scotland	Cowdenbeath*	Edinburgh City	4–1	6 April 2019	
33	Tommy Muir	Scotland	Annan Athletic*	Cove Rangers	6–1	30 November 2019	
34	Darryl Duffy	Scotland	Stirling Albion	Albion Rovers*	0–3	4 January 2020	
35	Kane Hester	Scotland	Elgin City*	Cowdenbeath	5–2	28 November 2020	
36	Liam Henderson	Scotland	Edinburgh City*	Albion Rovers	5–2	5 December 2020	
37	Kane Hester	Scotland	Elgin City*	Albion Rovers	3–0	14 August 2021	
38	Nathan Austin	England	Kelty Hearts	Albion Rovers*	0–3	18 September 2021	
39	Dominic Docherty	Scotland	Annan Athletic*	Elgin City	4–1	11 December 2021	
40	Tony Wallace	Scotland	Annan Athletic*	Kelty Hearts	5–1	26 December 2021	
41	Stefan McCluskey	Scotland	Forfar Athletic*	Annan Athletic	5–1	16 April 2022	
42	Dale Carrick	Scotland	Stirling Albion*	Edinburgh City	5–0	30 April 2022	
43	Kane Hester^{4}	Scotland	Elgin City*	Annan Athletic	5–1	1 October 2022	
44	Russell Dingwall	Scotland	Elgin City	Bonnyrigg Rose*	2–3	5 November 2022	
45	Blair Henderson	Scotland	The Spartans	Elgin City*	0–4	16 December 2023	
46	Blair Henderson	Scotland	The Spartans	East Fife*	0–3	30 January 2024	
47	Peter Pawlett	Scotland	Peterhead*	Clyde	4–1	30 March 2024	
48	Nathan Austin	England	East Fife	Stirling Albion*	0–4	24 August 2024	
49	Alan Trouten	Scotland	East Fife	Bonnyrigg Rose*	5–0	5 October 2024	
50	Connor Young	Scotland	Edinburgh City	Peterhead*	2–3	16 November 2024	
51	Russell McLean	Scotland	Forfar Athletic*	Bonnyrigg Rose	5–1	14 December 2024	
52	Dylan Gavin	Ireland	Elgin City*	Clyde	4–2	17 December 2024	
53	Oliver Colloty	New Zealand	Peterhead*	Bonnyrigg Rose	5–0	5 April 2025	
54	Robbie Mahon	Ireland	Edinburgh City	Elgin City*	2–4	23 August 2025	
55	Cameron Elliot^{4}	Scotland	East Kilbride*	Forfar Athletic	5–0	30 August 2025	
56	Marley Redfern	Scotland	Clyde	Annan Athletic*	0–6	13 September 2025	
57	John Robertson	Scotland	East Kilbride	Forfar Athletic*	0–3	6 December 2025	
58	Scott Shepard	Scotland	Forfar Athletic*	Elgin City	4–2	27 December 2025	
59	Mark Stowe	Scotland	The Spartans	Edinburgh City*	1–3	27 December 2025	
60	Russell McLean	Scotland	Stirling Albion	Edinburgh City*	1–4	10 January 2026	
61	James Hilton	Scotland	Clyde*	Edinburgh City	5–0	21 February 2026	
62	Marc McNulty	Scotland	The Spartans*	Annan Athletic	4–0	28 February 2026	
63	Tommy Goss	Scotland	Annan Athletic*	Edinburgh City	3–0	14 March 2026	
54	Scott Williamson	Scotland	Clyde*	Edinburgh City	3–2	5 September 2026	
55	Innes Lawson	Scotland	Edinburgh City*	Stirling Albion	7–3	12 September 2026	
56	Mark Stowe	Scotland	The Spartans*	Forfar Athletic	5–1	12 September 2026	
57	Robbie McNab	Scotland	Stirling Albion*	Forfar Athletic	5–2	31 October 2026	

=== Multiple hat-tricks ===
Rank	Player	Hat-tricks
1st	(Scotland) Blair Henderson	6
2nd	(Scotland) Nathan Austin	4
3rd	(Scotland) Bobby Linn	2
3rd	(Scotland) Darren Smith	2
3rd	(England) Peter Weatherson	2
3rd	(Scotland) Shane Sutherland	2
3rd	(Scotland) Darryl McHardy	2

== SPFL play-offs ==
=== Hat-tricks ===
As of 22:42, 18 February 2024 (UTC)

Key
^{4}	Player scored four goals
^{5}	Player scored five goals
*	The home team

No.	Player	Nationality	For	Against	Result^{[e]}	Date	Ref.	Division
1	Jordan White	Scotland	Stiring Albion	Annan Athletic*	3–5	10 May 2014		2014 Scottish League One play-offs
2	Greig Spence	Scotland	Alloa Athletic*	Brechin City	4–3	20 May 2017		2017 Scottish Championship play-offs
3	Stephen Dobbie	Scotland	Queen of the South*	Montrose	5–0	11 May 2019		2019 Scottish Championship play-offs
4	Callum Smith	Scotland	Airdrieonians*	Montrose	6–4	7 May 2022		2022 Scottish Championship play-offs
5	Andy Winter	Scotland	Hamilton Academical*	Alloa Athletic	5–2	13 May 2023		2023 Scottish Championship play-offs
6	Blair Henderson	Scotland	The Spartans	Peterhead*	1–5	11 May 2024		2024 Scottish League One play-offs

== Notes ==
^{a} The Scottish Premiership is the top tier of the Scottish Professional Football League (SPFL) and level one of the Scottish football league system. It was established in 2013.

^{b} The Scottish Championship is the second tier of the Scottish Professional Football League (SPFL) and level two of the Scottish football league system. It was established in 2013.

^{c} The Scottish League One is the third tier of the Scottish Professional Football League (SPFL) and level three of the Scottish football league system. It was established in 2013.

^{d} The Scottish League Two is the bottom tier of the Scottish Professional Football League (SPFL) and level four of the Scottish football league system. It was established in 2013.

^{e} The results column shows the home team score first.

^{f} Includes one hat-trick scored in the 2014 Scottish League One play-offs.

^{g} Includes one hat-trick scored in the 2017 Scottish Championship play-offs.
