= 2010–11 Peterhead F.C. season =

Peterhead
2010–11 season
- Chairman: Rodger Morrison
- Manager: Neale Cooper; John Sheran
- Stadium: Balmoor
- Second Division: Tenth place
- Challenge Cup: Semi-final, lost to Queen of the South
- League Cup: Second round, lost to Inverness Caledonian Thistle
- Scottish Cup: Fourth round, lost to St Mirren
- Top goalscorer: League: Dennis Wyness (8); All: Dennis Wyness (13)
- Highest home attendance: 831 vs. Airdrie United, 2 April 2011
- Lowest home attendance: 312 vs. Airdrie United, 14 December 2012
- Average home league attendance: 490

The 2010–11 season was Peterhead's sixth consecutive season in the Scottish Second Division, having been promoted from the Scottish Third Division at the end of the 2004–05 season. Peterhead also competed in the Challenge Cup, League Cup and the Scottish Cup.

== Summary ==
Peterhead finished Tenth in the Second Division and were relegated to the Scottish Third Division. They reached the Semi-final of the Scottish Challenge Cup, the second round of the League Cup and the fourth round of the Scottish Cup.

=== Management ===
Peterhead began the 2010–11 season under the management of Neale Cooper. On 22 March 2011, Cooper was sacked as manager, with Defender Bobby Mann being appointed as caretaker manager for their match that night against Stenhousemuir. John Sheran was then appointed as manager on a permanent basis.

== Results and fixtures ==
Win Draw Loss

=== Scottish Second Division ===
7 August 2010 Scottish Second Division	Stenhousemuir	3–1	Peterhead	Ochilview Park
	Clark 17', 68'; Williams 50'	BBC Report	Donald 37'	Attendance: 423; Referee: Law

14 August 2010 Scottish Second Division	Peterhead	1–2	Forfar Athletic	Balmoor
15:00	Gethans 77'	SFL Report	Gibson 18'; Hilson 27'; Gallacher (red card) 71'	Attendance: 371; Referee: Madden

21 August 2010 Scottish Second Division	East Fife	2–1	Peterhead	Bayview Stadium
	Johnstone 76'; Sloan 82'	BBC Report	Bavidge 43'	Attendance: 565; Referee: Conroy

28 August 2010 Scottish Second Division	Ayr United	1–1	Peterhead	Somerset Park
	Roberts 90' (Penalty)	BBC Report	Emslie 11'; Emslie (yellow card) 78' (red card)	Attendance: 1,099; Referee: Finnie

11 September 2010 Scottish Second Division	Peterhead	0– 0	Livingston	Balmoor
15:00		BBC Report		Attendance: 431; Referee: Beaton

18 September 2010 Scottish Second Division	Airdrie United	2–2	Peterhead	Excelsior Stadium
	Stevenson 19'; Gemmill 81'	SFL Report	Gethans 22'; Bavidge 72'	Attendance: 846; Referee: Muir

25 September 2010 Scottish Second Division	Peterhead	1–0	Alloa Athletic	Balmoor
	Anderson 86'	BBC Report		Attendance: 534; Referee: McKendrick

2 October 2010 Scottish Second Division	Brechin City	4–2	Peterhead	Glebe Park
	Molloy 2'; McAllister 39', 58', 66'	SFL Report	Wyness 11' (Penalty); Bavidge 91'	Attendance: 473; Referee: Clancy

16 October 2010 Scottish Second Division	Peterhead	1–0	Dumbarton	Balmoor
	Ross 49'	SFL Report		Attendance: 496; Referee: Hilland

23 October 2010 Scottish Second Division	Livingston	1– 0	Peterhead	Braidwood Motor Company Stadium
15:00	Winters 62'	BBC Report		Attendance: 1,295; Referee: McDermott

30 October 2010 Scottish Second Division	Peterhead	2–4	Ayr United	Balmoor
15:00	Smith 18'; Bateman (red card) 32'; Robertson 87' (Own goal)	BBC Report	Roberts 33' (Penalty); Trouten 38'; McCann 38'; McKay 82'	Attendance: 560; Referee: Salmond

6 November 2010 Scottish Second Division	Forfar Athletic	1–1	Peterhead	Station Park
	Campbell (yellow card) 34' (red card); Campbell (red card) 37'; Fotheringham 88'	SFL Report	Clark 79'	Attendance: 497; Referee: Nicholls

13 November 2010 Scottish Second Division	Peterhead	2–2	East Fife	Balmoor
	Bavidge 87'; Anderson 89'	BBC Report	Byrne 47'; Johnstone 60'	Attendance: 594; Referee: Beaton

4 December 2010 Scottish Second Division	Alloa Athletic	2–2	Peterhead	Recreation Park
	Noble 35'; McDonald 90+1' (Penalty)	BBC Report	Strachan 22' (Penalty); Clark 44'	Attendance: 601; Referee: Smith

11 December 2010 Scottish Second Division	Peterhead	0–5	Brechin City	Balmoor
	Anderson (red card) 36'	SFL Report	McAllister 6', 34' (Penalty), 58', 79'; Archdeacon 91'	Attendance: 466; Referee: McLean

14 December 2010 Scottish Second Division	Peterhead	5–1	Airdrie United	Balmoor
	Sharp 3'; Clark 39'; Ross 44', 79'; McCord 93'	SFL Report	Gemmill 51'; Molloy (red card) 70'	Attendance: 312; Referee: Fergusson

15 January 2011 Scottish Second Division	Peterhead	3–0	Livingston	Balmoor
15:00	Ross 26'; Strachan 50', 71' (pen.)	BBC Report	Winters (yellow card) 66' (red card)	Attendance: 585; Referee: Robertson

22 January 2011 Scottish Second Division	Ayr United	2–2	Peterhead	Somerset Park
	Roberts 12' (Penalty), 29' (Penalty)	BBC Report	Sharp 54'; Ross 65'	Attendance: 1,226; Referee: Richmond

29 January 2011 Scottish Second Division	Peterhead	4–1	Alloa Athletic	Balmoor
	Wyness 22', 70'; Bavidge 27'; Gethins 90'	BBC Report	Noble 13'	Attendance: 469; Referee: Conroy

5 February 2011 Scottish Second Division	Airdrie United	1–0	Peterhead	Excelsior Stadium
	Craig 30'; Devlin (red card) 91'	SFL Report		Attendance: 660; Referee: McDermott

12 February 2011 Scottish Second Division	Brechin City	3–1	Peterhead	Glebe Park
	McKenna 52', 70'; McLean (yellow card) 77' (red card); Redman 88'	SFL Report	Strachan 32'	Attendance: 503; Referee: Beaton

19 February 2011 Scottish Second Division	Peterhead	1–2	Dumbarton	Balmoor
15:00	Smith 49'	SFL Report	McStay 25'; McShane 78'	Attendance: 388; Referee: Roache

22 February 2011 Scottish Second Division	Dumbarton	3–0	Peterhead	Strathclyde Homes Stadium
	Gilhaney 32', 54'; McShane 60'	SFL Report	Donald (red card) 39'	Attendance: 376; Referee: Somers

26 February 2011 Scottish Second Division	Stenhousemuir	4–2	Peterhead	Ochilview Park
	Williams 29'; Dalziel 40'; Anderson 45+1'; Lynch 88'	BBC Report	Emslie 35'; McDonald 38'	Attendance: 363; Referee: Charleston

1 March 2011 Scottish Second Division	East Fife	3–1	Peterhead	Bayview Stadium
	Hislop 22'; Linn 32', 54'	BBC Report	Bavidge 73'	Attendance: 314; Referee: Madden

5 March 2011 Scottish Second Division	Peterhead	1–1	Forfar Athletic	Balmoor
15:00	Gethans 34'	SFL Report	Campbell 93'	Attendance: 479; Referee: McDermott

19 March 2011 Scottish Second Division	Ayr United	1–2	Peterhead	Somerset Park
	Wyness 81' (Penalty)	BBC Report	Trouten 24'; Moffat 68'	Attendance: 536; Referee: Beaton

22 March 2011 Scottish Second Division	Peterhead	2–2	Stenhousemuir	Balmoor
	Wyness 41', 61' (Penalty)	BBC Report	Anderson 35', 39'	Attendance: 384; Referee: Northcroft

26 March 2011 Scottish Second Division	Alloa Athletic	0–0	Peterhead	Recreation Park
		BBC Report		Attendance: 406; Referee: Robertson

29 March 2011 Scottish Second Division	Livingston	5– 1	Peterhead	Braidwood Motor Company Stadium
19:45	Hamill 51'; Russell 62', 83'; De Vita 74'; Fox 89'	BBC Report	Bavidge 28'	Attendance: 754; Referee: Colvin

2 April 2011 Scottish Second Division	Peterhead	2–4	Airdrie United	Balmoor
	Tosh 22', 61'	SFL Report	McVitie 6' (Own Goal); Johnston 29'; Bain 32'; Gemill 42'	Attendance: 831; Referee: Watters

9 April 2011 Scottish Second Division	Dumbarton	5–2	Peterhead	Strathclyde Homes Stadium
	McShane 28'; Walker 40'; Halsman 64'; Gilhaney 73' (Penalty); McLeish 82'	SFL Report	Wyness 60'; Ross 81'	Attendance: 526; Referee: Charleston

16 April 2011 Scottish Second Division	Peterhead	1–1	Brechin City	Balmoor
	Clark 42'	SFL Report	Megginson 39'	Attendance: 498; Referee: Roache

23 April 2011 Scottish Second Division	Peterhead	0–2	East Fife	Balmoor
		BBC Report	Johnstone 28'; Muir 54'	Attendance: 473; Referee: Hilland

30 April 2011 Scottish Second Division	Forfar Athletic	2–1	Peterhead	Station Park
	Smith 35'; Sellars 66'	SFL Report	Wyness 64'; Ross (red card) 73'	Attendance: 448; Referee: Collum

7 May 2011 Scottish Second Division	Peterhead	0–3	Stenhousemuir	Balmoor
		BBC Report	Anderson 42'; Paton 68'; Dalziel 75'	Attendance: 405; Referee: Colvin

=== Scottish Challenge Cup ===
24 July 2010 Challenge Cup round 1	Peterhead	5–0	Montrose	Balmoor
	Wyness 7', 56'; McNalley 50' (o.g.); Emslie 66'; Bavidge 76'	SFL Report		Attendance: 357; Referee: Beaton

10 August 2010 Challenge Cup round 2	Peterhead	6–1	East Stirlingshire	Balmoor
	Smith 14'; Hay 54' (o.g.); Bavidge 66'; MacDonald 71', 74'; Gethans 84'	SFL Report	Maguire 38' (pen.)	Attendance: 368; Referee: Simpson

5 September 2010 Challenge Cup Round QF	Peterhead	3–1	Stenhousemuir	Balmoor
	Wyness 9', 50'; Gethans 43'	BBC Report	Dalziel 76'	Attendance: 442; Referee: Colvin

9 October 2010 Challenge Cup Round SF	Peterhead	1–2	Queen of the South	Balmoor
	Bavidge 78'	SFL Report	Reid 66'; Holmes 69'	Attendance: 1,003; Referee: Tumilty

=== Scottish League Cup ===
31 July 2010 League Cup round 1	Peterhead	1–0	Berwick Rangers	Balmoor
	Wyness 82'	BBC Report		Attendance: 399; Referee: Watters

25 August 2010 League Cup round 2	Inverness Caledonian Thistle	3–0	Peterhead	Caledonian Stadium
	Rooney 32' (pen.), 49'; Munro 38'	BBC Report		Attendance: 1,001; Referee: Somers

=== Scottish Cup ===
20 November 2010 Scottish Cup round 3	Peterhead	2–0	Cowdenbeath	Balmoor
	Strachan 42'; McVitie 50'	BBC Report; SFA Report		Attendance: 510; Referee: Watters

8 January 2011 Scottish Cup round 4	St Mirren	0–0	Peterhead	St Mirren Park
		BBC Report		Attendance: 2,312; Referee: McKendrick

18 January 2011 Scottish Cup round 4 replay	Peterhead	1–6	St Mirren	Balmoor
	Sharp 89'	BBC Report	McGowan 22', 33', 46'; Mooy 31'; McQuade 45', 56'	Attendance: 1,610; Referee: McKendrick

== Player statistics ==
=== Squad ===
No.	Pos	Nat	Player	Total		Second Division		Challenge Cup		League Cup		Scottish Cup	
No.	Pos	Nat	Player	Apps	Goals	Apps	Goals	Apps	Goals	Apps	Goals	Apps	Goals
	GK	(England) ENG	John Bateman	28	0	21+2	0	2+0	0	0+0	0	3+0	0
	GK	(Scotland) SCO	Paul Jarvie	20	0	15+1	0	2+0	0	2+0	0	0+0	0
	DF	(Scotland) SCO	David Donald	42	1	33+0	1	4+0	0	2+0	0	3+0	0
	DF	(Ireland) EIR	Conor Gethins	33	6	11+15	4	2+1	2	1+1	0	0+2	0
	DF	(Scotland) SCO	Callum MacDonald	42	3	30+3	1	4+0	2	2+0	0	2+1	0
	DF	(Scotland) SCO	Bobby Mann	13	0	9+0	0	1+0	0	1+0	0	2+0	0
	DF	(Scotland) SCO	Scott Ross	23	0	17+3	0	0+0	0	0+1	0	2+0	0
	DF	(Scotland) SCO	Stirling Smith	14	0	13+1	0	0+0	0	0+0	0	0+0	0
	DF	(Scotland) SCO	Stuart Smith	43	3	34+0	2	4+0	1	2+0	0	3+0	0
	DF	(Scotland) SCO	Ryan Strachan	37	5	23+6	4	1+3	0	0+1	0	3+0	1
	MF	(Scotland) SCO	Stuart Anderson	20	2	13+1	2	3+0	0	1+0	0	2+0	0
	MF	(Scotland) SCO	Nicky Clark	29	4	14+10	4	0+1	0	0+1	0	2+1	0
	MF	(Scotland) SCO	Paul Emslie	35	3	23+4	2	4+0	1	2+0	0	0+2	0
	MF	(Scotland) SCO	Neil McVitie	39	1	28+2	0	4+0	0	2+0	0	2+1	1
	MF	(Scotland) SCO	Daniel Moore	22	0	11+5	0	4+0	0	2+0	0	0+0	0
	MF	(Scotland) SCO	Shuan Robertson	1	0	0+1	0	0+0	0	0+0	0	0+0	0
	MF	(Scotland) SCO	Graeme Sharp	38	3	25+6	2	2+0	0	2+0	0	2+1	1
	MF	(Scotland) SCO	Barry Stephens	6	0	2+4	0	0+0	0	0+0	0	0+0	0
	FW	(Scotland) SCO	Martin Bavidge	37	10	30+0	7	4+0	3	1+0	0	2+0	0
	FW	(Scotland) SCO	Peter Bruce	1	0	0+0	0	0+1	0	0+0	0	0+0	0
	FW	(Scotland) SCO	Paul Campbell	2	0	0+2	0	0+0	0	0+0	0	0+0	0
	FW	(Scotland) SCO	Jamie Maclachlan	1	0	0+1	0	0+0	0	0+0	0	0+0	0
	FW	(Scotland) SCO	Dave Ross	29	6	19+7	6	0+1	0	0+0	0	1+1	0
	FW	(Scotland) SCO	Paul Tosh	6	2	4+2	2	0+0	0	0+0	0	0+0	0
	FW	(Scotland) SCO	Dennis Wyness	36	13	21+7	8	4+0	4	2+0	1	2+0	0
	FW	(Scotland) SCO	Paul Young	1	0	0+0	0	0+1	0	0+0	0	0+0	0

== League table ==
Pos	Team	Pld	W	D	L	GF	GA	GD	Pts	Promotion, qualification or relegation
6	Airdrie United	36	13	9	14	52	60	−8	48	
7	Dumbarton	36	11	7	18	52	70	−18	40	
8	Stenhousemuir	36	10	8	18	46	59	−13	38	
9	Alloa Athletic (R)	36	9	9	18	49	71	−22	36	Qualification for the Second Division play-offs
10	Peterhead (R)	36	5	11	20	47	76	−29	26	Relegation to the Third Division

Source: SPFL
Rules for classification: 1) points; 2) goal difference; 3) number of goals scored.
(R) Relegated

== See also ==
- List of Peterhead F.C. seasons
