= List of Peterhead F.C. seasons =

This is a list of Peterhead Football Club seasons from 1899 to 1999, when Peterhead joined the Aberdeenshire Football Association and Aberdeenshire League, to the present day. The list details Peterhead's record in league and cup competitions, and the club's top league goal scorer of each season. Top scorers in bold were also the top scorers in Peterhead's division that season. Records of competitions such as the Aberdeenshire Cup are not included.

The club was founded in 1891 and originally played in the Aberdeenshire League. In 2000 the club was elected to the Scottish Football League along with Elgin City F.C.

== Seasons ==
This list is incomplete; you can help by adding missing items with reliable sources.

Season	League									Scottish Cup	Highland League Cup Scottish League Cup	Challenge Cup	Top league goalscorer	
Season	Division	P	W	D	L	F	A	Pts	Pos	Scottish Cup	Highland League Cup Scottish League Cup	Challenge Cup	Name	Goals
1899–1900	Aberdeenshire	4	4	0	0	41	2	8	–	–	N/A	N/A		
1900–01	–									–	N/A	N/A	–	
1901–02	–									–	N/A	N/A	–	
1902–03	–									–	N/A	N/A	–	
1903–04	–									–	N/A	N/A	–	
1904–05	–									–	N/A	N/A	–	
1905–06	–									–	N/A	N/A	–	
1906–07	–									–	N/A	N/A	–	
1907–08	–									–	N/A	N/A	–	
1908–09	–									–	N/A	N/A	–	
1909–10	–									–	N/A	N/A	–	
1910–11	–									–	N/A	N/A	–	
1911–12	–									R1	N/A	N/A	–	
1912–13	–									–	N/A	N/A	–	
1913–14	–									–	N/A	N/A	–	
1914–15	–									N/A	N/A	N/A	–	
1915–16	–									N/A	N/A	N/A	–	
1916–17	–									N/A	N/A	N/A	–	
1917–18	–									N/A	N/A	N/A	–	
1918–19	–									N/A	N/A	N/A	–	
1919–20	North Eastern	8	1	4	3	12	21	6	5th	–	N/A	N/A		
1920–21	North Eastern	5	2	1	2	10	11	5	4th	R1	N/A	N/A		
1921–22	Aberdeenshire	10	5	1	4	13	21	11	5th	–	N/A	N/A		
1922–23	Aberdeenshire	8	3	1	4	13	17	7	4th	R3	N/A	N/A		
1923–24	Aberdeenshire	11	2	2	7	18	38	6	5th	–	N/A	N/A		
1924–25	Aberdeenshire	10	4	2	4	16	21	8	5th	R1	N/A	N/A		
1925–26	Aberdeenshire	14	5	4	5	24	28	14	4th	R1	N/A	N/A		
1926–27	Aberdeenshire	4	0	0	4	5	18	0	7th	–	N/A	N/A		
1927–28	Aberdeenshire	12	2	3	7	13	24	7	7th	–	N/A	N/A		
1928–29	Aberdeenshire	9	1	2	6	11	22	4	7th	–	N/A	N/A		
1929–30	Aberdeenshire	11	2	2	7	17	29	6	7th	R1	N/A	N/A		
1930–31	Aberdeenshire	6	1	2	3	9	14	4	5th	R1	N/A	N/A		
1931–32	Highland	26	10	6	10	52	48	26	8th	–	N/A	N/A		
1932–33	Highland	26	12	3	11	47	42	27	7th	–	N/A	N/A		
1933–34	Highland	26	9	2	15	52	56	20	10th	R1	N/A	N/A		
1934–35	Highland	24	10	6	8	51	48	26	7th	–	N/A	N/A		
1935–36	Highland	22	14	1	7	68	50	29	2nd	–	N/A	N/A		
1936–37	Highland	22	12	4	6	69	44	28	2nd	–	N/A	N/A		
1937–38	Highland	22	8	3	11	56	73	19	8th	R1	N/A	N/A		
1938–39	Highland	26	11	2	13	60	57	24	10th	–	N/A	N/A		
1939–40	Highland	4	1	1	2	10	10	3	–	N/A	N/A	N/A		
1940–41	–									N/A	N/A	N/A	–	
1941–42	–									N/A	N/A	N/A	–	
1942–43	–									N/A	N/A	N/A	–	
1943–44	–									N/A	N/A	N/A	–	
1944–45	–									N/A	N/A	N/A	–	
1945–46	–									N/A	N/A	N/A	–	
1946–47	Highland	30	22	5	3	89	38	49	1st	R1	SF	N/A		
1947–48	Highland	30	22	3	5	98	43	47	2nd	R2	R2	N/A		
1948–49	Highland	30	24	3	3	120	35	51	1st	–	R2	N/A		
1949–50	Highland	30	21	4	5	85	42	46	1st	–	R1	N/A		
1950–51	Highland	28	15	2	11	76	49	32	4th	R1	SF	N/A		
1951–52	Highland	28	8	4	16	39	66	20	13rd	–	GS	N/A		
1952–53	Highland	28	10	3	15	52	73	23	12th	–	GS	N/A		
1953–54	Highland	28	14	4	10	83	69	32	5th	–	GS	N/A		
1954–55	Highland	27	8	4	15	55	75	20	–	R3		N/A		
1955–56	Highland	28	8	4	16	63	88	20	11th	R1	RU	N/A		
1956–57	Highland	28	12	5	11	64	62	29	8th	R2	GS	N/A		
1957–58	Highland	28	14	5	9	57	52	33	3rd	–		N/A		
1958–59	Highland	28	15	3	10	74	65	33	4th	–	GS	N/A		
1959–60	Highland	28	10	5	13	65	67	25	9th	–	SF	N/A		
1960–61	Highland	28	14	5	9	74	57	33	4th	–		N/A		
1961–62	Highland	28	17	1	10	87	61	35	5th	R1	GS	N/A		
1962–63	Highland	28	11	3	14	75	71	25	9th	–	W	N/A		
1963–64	Highland	30	8	3	19	70	85	19	14th	–	RU	N/A		
1964–65	Highland	30	16	2	12	94	83	34	8th	–	GS	N/A		
1965–66	Highland	30	14	5	11	78	67	33	7th	–	W	N/A		
1966–67	Highland	30	18	2	10	94	60	38	4th	–	R1	N/A		
1967–68	Highland	30	19	2	9	98	57	40	4th	–	W	N/A		
1968–69	Highland	30	19	3	8	93	45	41	4th	–	RU	N/A		
1969–70	Highland	30	17	5	8	83	52	39	6th	PR1	RU	N/A		
1970–71	Highland	30	19	7	4	98	45	45	3rd	–	R1	N/A		
1971–72	Highland	30	19	5	6	62	31	43	5th	–	R1	N/A		
1972–73	Highland	30	13	4	13	51	40	30	7th	–	R1	N/A		
1973–74	Highland	30	5	10	15	35	61	20	13rd	–	R1	N/A		
1974–75	Highland	30	11	6	13	54	58	28	11th	–	R1	N/A		
1975–76	Highland	30	19	5	6	85	42	43	4th	R1	SF	N/A		
1976–77	Highland	30	21	4	5	77	35	46	2nd	–	R1	N/A		
1977–78	Highland	30	22	3	5	85	33	47	2nd	R2	R1	N/A		
1978–79	Highland	30	19	5	6	62	32	43	3rd	R2	R1	N/A		
1979–80	Highland	30	13	7	10	43	30	33	8th	R3	R1	N/A		
1980–81	Highland	30	14	8	8	50	35	36	6th	–	W	N/A		
1981–82	Highland	30	17	7	6	67	39	41	2nd	–	R1	N/A		
1982–83	Highland	30	15	7	8	68	49	52	5th	R1	RU	N/A		
1983–84	Highland	30	17	6	7	45	21	57	3rd	R2	R2	N/A		
1984–85	Highland	30	14	5	11	45	41	47	8th	–	R2	N/A		
1985–86	Highland	32	22	3	7	70	32	69	3rd	R2	R2	N/A		
1986–87	Highland	34	18	7	9	67	45	61	7th	R4	SF	N/A		
1987–88	Highland	34	22	5	7	68	40	71	3rd	–	R1	N/A		
1988–89	Highland	34	22	8	4	79	35	74	1st	–	R1	N/A		
1989–90	Highland	34	23	4	7	77	35	73	3rd	–	W	N/A		
1990–91	Highland	34	13	11	10	50	45	50	8th	–	PR	–		
1991–92	Highland	34	16	6	12	61	59	54	9th	R2	R1	–		
1992–93	Highland	34	8	10	16	61	80	34	14th	R1	R1	–		
1993–94	Highland	34	12	8	14	55	56	44	11th	–	PR	–		
1994–95	Highland	30	15	7	8	64	43	52	6th	–	GS	–		
1995–96	Highland	30	16	7	7	74	51	55	4th	–	GS	–		
1996–97	Highland	30	17	7	6	77	30	58	3rd	R2	GS	–		
1997–98	Highland	30	20	5	5	88	34	65	3rd	R2	GS	–		
1998–99	Highland	30	24	4	2	89	19	76	1st	R2	GS	–		
1999–2000	Highland	30	18	4	8	66	39	58	4th	R3	GS	–		
2000–01	SFL 3	36	13	10	13	46	46	49	5th	QF	R1	R2	Craig Yeats	11
2001–02	SFL 3	36	17	5	14	63	52	56	4th	R1	R1	R2	**Martin Johnston**; **Iain Stewart**	**18**
2002–03	SFL 3	36	20	8	8	76	37	68	4th	R3	R1	R1	Iain Stewart	21
2003–04	SFL 3	36	18	7	11	67	37	61	4th	R2	R2	R2	Martin Johnston	18
2004–05	SFL 3	36	23	9	4	39	81	38	2nd	R1	R2	R2	Scott Michie	21
2005–06	SFL 2	36	17	6	13	53	47	57	3rd	R3	R2	R1	Bobby Linn	12
2006–07	SFL 2	36	11	8	17	60	62	41	8th	R2	R2	R1	Martin Bavidge	11
2007–08	SFL 2	36	16	7	13	65	54	55	5th	R3	R2	R2	Martin Bavidge	15
2008–09	SFL 2	36	15	11	10	54	39	56	4th	R4	R1	R2	Martin Bavidge; Graeme Sharp	9
2009–10	SFL 2	36	15	6	15	45	49	51	5th	R3	R1	R1	Martin Bavidge	11
2010–11	SFL 2	36	5	1	20	47	76	26	10th	R4	R2	SF	Dennis Wyness	8
2011–12	SFL 3	36	15	6	15	51	53	51	5th	R4	R1	R2	Rory McAllister	20
2012–13	SFL 3	36	17	8	11	52	28	59	2nd	R2	R1	R1	Rory McAllister	21
2013–14	SL 2	36	23	7	6	74	38	76	1st	R2	R1	R2	Rory McAllister	32
2014–15	SL 1	36	14	9	13	51	54	51	6th	R3	R1	QF	Rory McAllister	8
2015–16	SL 1	36	16	11	9	72	47	59	3rd	R3	R1	RU	Rory McAllister	22
2016–17	SL 1	36	10	10	16	44	59	40	9th	R3	R2	R3	Rory McAllister	16
2017–18	SL 2	36	24	4	8	79	39	76	2nd	R4	GS	R3	Rory McAllister	20
2018–19	SL 2	36	24	7	5	65	29	79	1st	R3	GS	R2	Rory McAllister	15
2019–20	SL 1	27	7	5	15	30	44	26	8th	R3	GS	R2	Scott Brown	8
2020–21	SL 1	22	9	2	11	24	27	29	7th	R2	GS	N/A	Scott Brown	5
2021–22	SL 1	36	11	9	16	46	51	42	7th	R5	GS	R2	Russell McLean	12
2022–23	SL 1	36	3	7	26	19	84	16	10th	R3	GS	R3	Jason Brown; Kieran Shanks; Conor O'Keefe	3
2023–24	SL 2	36	16	12	8	58	39	60	2nd	R3	GS	R4	Kieran Shanks; Hamish Ritchie	9
2024–25	SL 2	36	19	9	8	52	40	66	1st	R3	GS	R4	Kieran Shanks	10

== Key ==
Champions	Runners-up	Promoted	Relegated

- P = Played
- W = Games won
- D = Games drawn
- L = Games lost
- F = Goals for
- A = Goals against
- Pts = Points
- Pos = Final position
- R1 = Round 1
- R2 = Round 2
- R3 = Round 3
- R4 = Round 4
- QF = Quarter-finals
- SF = Semi-finals
- Aberdeenshire, North Eastern = Aberdeenshire and District League
- Highland = Highland Football League
- SFL 3 = Scottish Third Division
- SFL 2 = Scottish Second Division
- SL2 = Scottish League Two
- SL1 = Scottish League One
