= 2025 Indian Super League playoffs =

2025 edition of the ISL Cup playoffs

2024–25 ISL Cup playoffs
Tournament details
- Country: India
- Teams: 6

Final positions
- Champions: Mohun Bagan (2nd title)
- Runners-up: Bengaluru
- Semifinalists: Goa; Jamshedpur

Tournament statistics
- Matches played: 7
- Goals scored: 20 (2.86 per match)

The 2025 Indian Super League Cup playoffs was the post-season knockout tournament of the 2024–25 Indian Super League to determine the ISL Cup winners. It was the 11th and last edition of the Indian Super League playoffs. The competition began on 29 March 2025 and concluded with the ISL Cup final on 12 April 2025.

The top two teams from the regular season — Mohun Bagan and Goa — directly qualified for the semi-finals.

Teams finishing third to sixth competed in single-leg knockout play-offs to decide the remaining semi-finalists. Bengaluru advanced after defeating Mumbai City in Knockout Play-off 1, while Jamshedpur triumphed over NorthEast United in Knockout Play-off 2.

The semi-finals were played over two legs, while the final was a single match hosted at the Vivekananda Yuba Bharati Krirangan Stadium in Kolkata. Mohun Bagan defeated Bengaluru in the final to claim their second ISL Cup title.

== Season table ==
Pos	Team	Pld	W	D	L	GF	GA	GD	Pts	Qualification
1	Mohun Bagan (C, W)	24	17	5	2	47	16	+31	56	Qualification for the Champions League Two group stage and semi-finals
2	Goa	24	14	6	4	43	27	+16	48	Qualification for the Champions League Two preliminary stage and semi-finals (Note: Goa qualified for the AFC Champions League Two preliminary stage by winning the 2025 Super Cup.)
3	Bengaluru	24	11	5	8	40	31	+9	38 (Note: Head-to-head points: Bengaluru 7, NorthEast 7, Jamshedpur 3; Head-to-head goal difference: Bengaluru +2, NorthEast -2.)	Qualification for the knockouts
4	NorthEast United	24	10	8	6	46	29	+17	38	Qualification for the knockouts
5	Jamshedpur	24	12	2	10	37	43	−6	38	Qualification for the knockouts
6	Mumbai City	24	9	9	6	29	28	+1	36	Qualification for the knockouts
7	Odisha	24	8	9	7	44	37	+7	33	
8	Kerala Blasters	24	8	5	11	33	37	−4	29	
9	East Bengal	24	8	4	12	27	33	−6	28 (Note: Head-to-head points: East Bengal 6, Punjab 0.)	
10	Punjab	24	8	4	12	34	38	−4	28	
11	Chennaiyin	24	7	6	11	34	39	−5	27	
12	Hyderabad	24	4	6	14	22	47	−25	18	
13	Mohammedan	24	2	7	15	12	43	−31	13	

Source: ISL
Rules for classification: 1) points; 2) goal difference; 3) number of goals scored; 4) head-to-head points; 5) head-to-head goal difference; 6) head-to-head goals scored; 7) fair play ranking; 8) drawing of lots
(Note: Head-to-head record is used only after all the matches between the teams in question have been played).
(C) Champions; (W) ISL Cup winners

== Teams ==
Automatically qualified for semi-finals

- Mohun Bagan
- Goa

Qualified for the knockout play-offs

- NorthEast United
- Bengaluru
- Jamshedpur
- Mumbai City

== Bracket ==
Knockout
4	NorthEast United	0
5	Jamshedpur	2
3	Bengaluru	5
6	Mumbai City	0

Semifinals
1	Mohun Bagan	1	2	3
5	Jamshedpur	2	0	2
2	Goa	0	2	2
3	Bengaluru	2	1	3

Finals
1	Mohun Bagan (a.e.t.)	2
3	Bengaluru	1

=== Knockout play-offs ===
Team 1	Score	Team 2
Bengaluru	5–0	Mumbai City
NorthEast United	0–2	Jamshedpur

=== Semi-finals ===
Team 1	Agg.	Team 2	1st leg	2nd leg
Mohun Bagan	3–2	Jamshedpur	1–2	2–0
Goa	2–3	Bengaluru	0–2	2–1

== Knockout play-offs ==
1st Knockout play-offs

29 March 2025
19:30 IST

Bengaluru FC	5–0	Mumbai City
Suresh 9'; Méndez 42' (pen.); Williams 62'; Chhetri 76'; Díaz 83'	ISL; AIFF; I-League

Sree Kanteerava Stadium, Bengaluru
Attendance: 16,123
Referee: Harish Kundu

2nd Knockout play-offs

30 March 2025
19:30 IST

NorthEast United FC	0–2	Jamshedpur
	ISL; AIFF; I-League	Stephen 29'; Hernández 90+10'

Jawaharlal Nehru Stadium, Shillong
Attendance: 14,849
Referee: Senthil Nathan Sekaran

== Semi-finals ==
=== Semi-finals 1st legs ===
2 April 2025
19:30 IST

Bengaluru	2–0	Goa
Jhingan 42' (o.g.); Méndez 51'	ISL; AIFF; I-League

Sree Kanteerava Stadium, Bengaluru
Attendance: 19,443
Referee: Aditya Purkayastha
3 April 2025
19:30 IST

Jamshedpur	2–1	Mohun Bagan
Siverio 24'; Hernández 90+1'	ISL; AIFF; I-League	Cummings 37'

JRD Tata Sports Complex, Jamshedpur
Attendance: 20,968
Referee: Ashwin

=== Semi-finals 2nd legs ===
6 April 2025
19:30 IST

Goa	2–1	Bengaluru
Borja 49'; Sadiku 88'	ISL; AIFF; I-League	Chhetri 90+2'

Jawaharlal Nehru Stadium, Goa
Attendance: 16,875
Referee: Senthil Nathan Sekaran

Bengaluru won 3–2 on aggregate.

7 April 2025
19:30 IST

Mohun Bagan	2–0	Jamshedpur
Cummings 51' (pen.); Apuia 90+4'	ISL; AIFF; I-League

Vivekananda Yuba Bharati Krirangan, Kolkata
Attendance: 58,123
Referee: Tejas Visvasrao Nagvenkar

Mohun Bagan won 3–2 on aggregate.

== Final ==
Final Match
Team 1	Score	Team 2
Mohun Bagan	2–1	Bengaluru

12 April 2025
19:30 IST

Mohun Bagan	2–1 (a.e.t.)	Bengaluru
Cummings 72' (pen.); Maclaren 96'	ISL; AIFF; I-League	Alberto 49' (o.g.)

Vivekananda Yuba Bharati Krirangan, Kolkata
Attendance: 59,112
Referee: Senthil Nathan Sekaran
