= 2025 Indian Super League final =

2025 edition of the ISL Cup Final

ISL Cup Final 2025
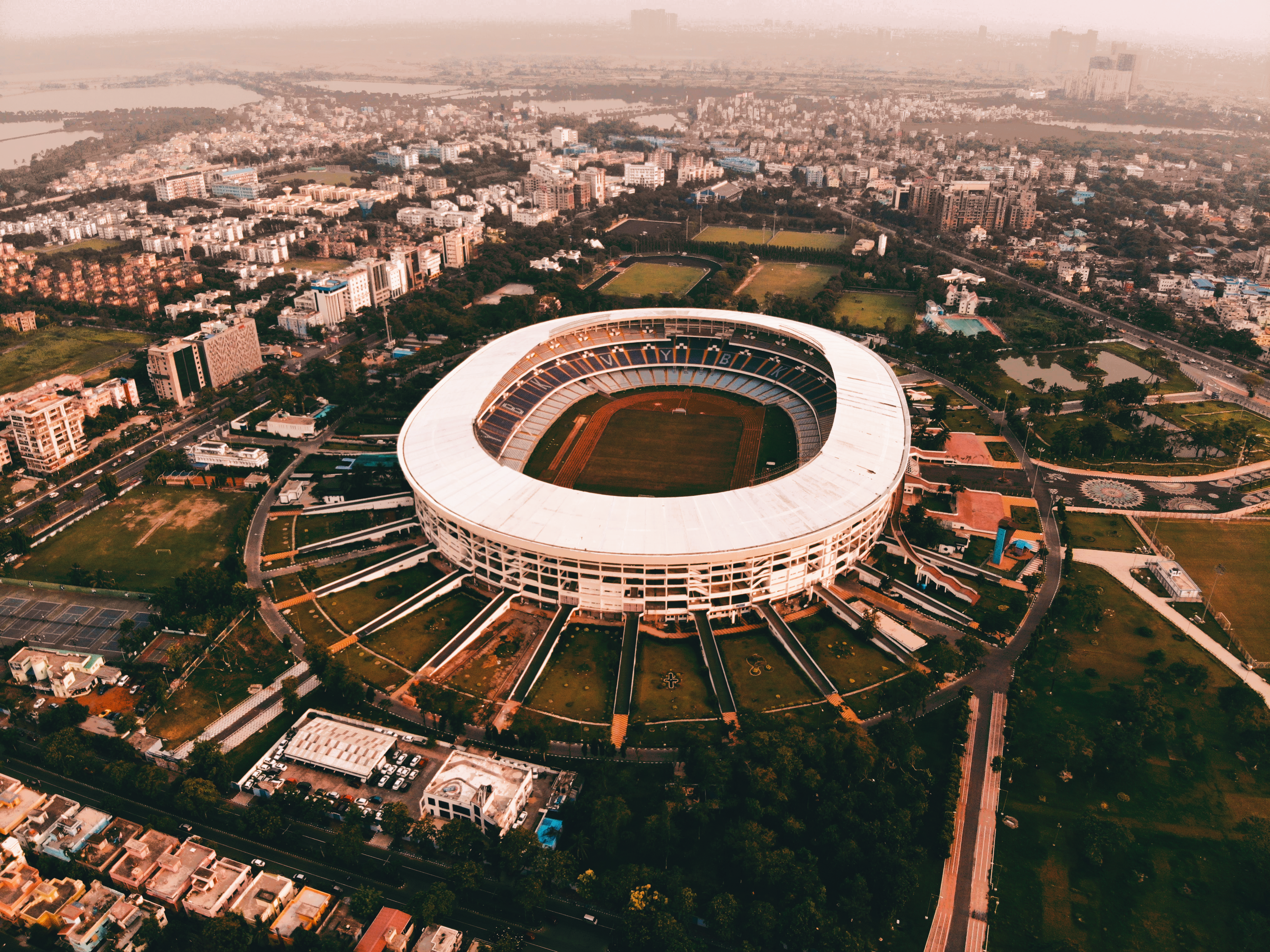
- Vivekananda Yuba Bharati Krirangan in Kolkata, the host venue of the 2025 ISL Cup Final
- Event: 2024–25 Indian Super League
Mohun Bagan	Bengaluru
2	1
- After extra time
- Date: April 12, 2025
- Venue: Vivekananda Yuba Bharati Krirangan, Kolkata
- Player of the Match: Jamie Maclaren (Mohun Bagan)
- Referee: Senthil Nathan S
- Attendance: 59,112

2025 Indian Super League Cup final was the final match of the 2025 ISL Cup playoffs. It was played on 12 April 2025 between Mohun Bagan SG and Bengaluru at Vivekananda Yuba Bharati Krirangan in Kolkata.

Both Mohun Bagan and Bengaluru were appearing in their fourth ISL Cup Final. Mohun Bagan won 2–1 after extra time to clinch their second ISL Cup title and complete a league and cup double. Jamie Maclaren was named the Player of the Match for his performance.

== Background ==
Mohun Bagan finished first in the regular season table and won 3–2 aggregate against Jamshedpur in the playoff semi-final to qualify for the final.

Bengaluru finished fourth in the regular season table and won 5–0 in the playoff knockout against Mumbai City. They then went on to win 3–2 aggregate against table second place FC Goa in the playoff semi-final to qualify for the final.

Points table

Pos	Team	Pld	Pts
1	Mohun Bagan (C, W)	24	56
2	Goa	24	48
3	Bengaluru	24	38
4	NorthEast United	24	38
5	Jamshedpur	24	38
6	Mumbai City	24	36
7	Odisha	24	33
8	Kerala Blasters	24	29
9	East Bengal	24	28
10	Punjab	24	28
11	Chennaiyin	24	27
12	Hyderabad	24	18
13	Mohammedan	24	13

Source: ISL
(C) Champions;
(W) ISL Cup winners

== Venues ==
The final match of the competition will be held at the Vivekananda Yuba Bharati Krirangan in West Bengal.

The final match will be held at this stadium.	Kolkata
The final match will be held at this stadium.	Vivekananda Yuba Bharati Krirangan
The final match will be held at this stadium.	Capacity: 66,600

== Match ==
12 April 2025
19:30 IST

Mohun Bagan	2–1 (a.e.t.)	Bengaluru
Cummings 72' (pen.); Maclaren 96'	ISL; AIFF; I-League	Alberto 49' (o.g.)

Vivekananda Yuba Bharati Krirangan, Kolkata
Attendance: 59,112
Referee: Senthil Nathan Sekaran

Mohun Bagan	Bengaluru

Player of the Match

- Jamie Maclaren (Mohun Bagan)

Match rules

- 90 minutes.
- 30 minutes of extra time if necessary.
- Penalty shoot-out if scores still level.
- Nine named substitutes.
- Maximum of five substitutions.
