= Jamie Maclaren =

Australian soccer player (born 1993)

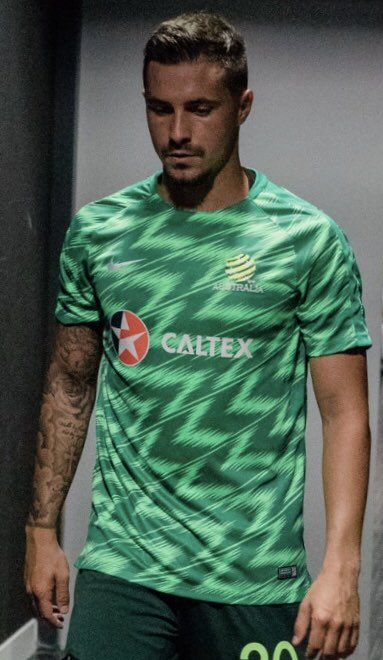
- Maclaren at the 2018 FIFA World Cup with Australia

Personal information
- Full name: Jamie Maclaren
- Date of birth: 29 July 1993 (age 33)
- Place of birth: Sunbury, Victoria, Australia
- Height: 1.78 m (5 ft 10 in)
- Position: Striker

Team information
- Current team: Mohun Bagan
- Number: 29

Youth career
- 1998–2003: Sunbury United
- 2003–2009: Green Gully
- 2009–2013: Blackburn Rovers

Senior career*
Years	Team	Apps	(Gls)
2013–2015	Perth Glory	38	(11)
2015–2017	Brisbane Roar	53	(40)
2017–2019	Darmstadt 98	7	(0)
2018–2019	→ Hibernian (loan)	27	(9)
2019–2024	Melbourne City	142	(103)
2024–	Mohun Bagan	53	(28)

International career^{‡}
2011–2012	Scotland U19	2	(0)
2012–2013	Australia U20	18	(9)
2014–2016	Australia U23	17	(9)
2016–2024	Australia	32	(11)
- * Club domestic league appearances and goals as of 03:45, 08 September 2026 (IST) ‡ National team caps and goals as of 29 January 2024

Jamie Maclaren (born 29 July 1993) is an on Australian professional soccer player who plays as a striker for Indian Super League club Mohun Bagan.

He previously played for Melbourne City, SV Darmstadt, Perth Glory, Brisbane Roar and Hibernian. Maclaren initially represented Scotland at youth level, but has since appeared for Australia at both youth and senior international level. Maclaren is a five time A-League Golden Boot winner as A-League top scorer in the 2016–17 (19 goals), 2019–20 (22 goals), 2020–21 (25 goals) and 2021–22 (15 goals) season, 2022–23 and 24 goals). With 154 goals across 3 clubs, Maclaren is the A-League's all time top goalscorer, Melbourne City's all time top goalscorer, as well as Brisbane Roar's third highest all time goalscorer.

== Club career ==
=== Early years ===
Maclaren grew up in the north-western suburbs of Melbourne. He first joined the junior side of local team Sunbury United at the early age of four or five, then switched to the youth ranks of nearby Victorian Premier League (now National Premier Leagues Victoria) side Green Gully in 2003, where although he continued to play against older players, his team was very successful, at one point winning around 50 games in a row.

=== Blackburn Rovers ===
In July 2009, aged 15, he was invited to trial for Blackburn Rovers' under-16 squad. In his first trial match he scored two goals against Derby County's under-16 squad, followed by a hat-trick against Manchester United, which resulted in a contract offer from Rovers.

Maclaren benefited from the mentorship of fellow Australians Vince Grella and Brett Emerton at Blackburn, where he soon progressed to be a regular under-21 squad player and training with the senior team. However, after four years in England having not broken into the first team, he was released by Rovers at the end of the 2012–13 season.

=== Perth Glory ===
Seeking first-team game time, Maclaren elected to return to Australia and signed a three-year contract with A-League club Perth Glory at the beginning of the 2013–14 season. Maclaren made his Perth Glory debut, where he played 90 minutes, in a 3–1 loss against Adelaide United. Maclaren then scored his first goal for Perth Glory weeks later, on 27 October 2013, in a 1–0 win over Melbourne City and scored his second Perth Glory goal on 23 November 2013

The 2014–15 season was his breakout year, scoring 10 goals in 23 appearances across all competitions, and earning the April nomination for the league's young player of the year award. He also made a number of appearances in the National Premier Leagues side scoring 11 goals in just five games. Maclaren scored his first senior club hat-trick, scoring all three of Glory's goals in a 3–1 win against Melbourne City on 19 April 2015.

At the end of the 2014–15 season, in the fallout from the Perth Glory salary cap scandal, Glory agreed to release all contracted players who wished to leave the club, with the sole exception of Maclaren. In response, he lodged a formal breach-of-contract notice against Perth Glory to the players' Union, Professional Footballers Australia. Maclaren was subsequently released by Glory on 29 June 2015.

=== Brisbane Roar ===
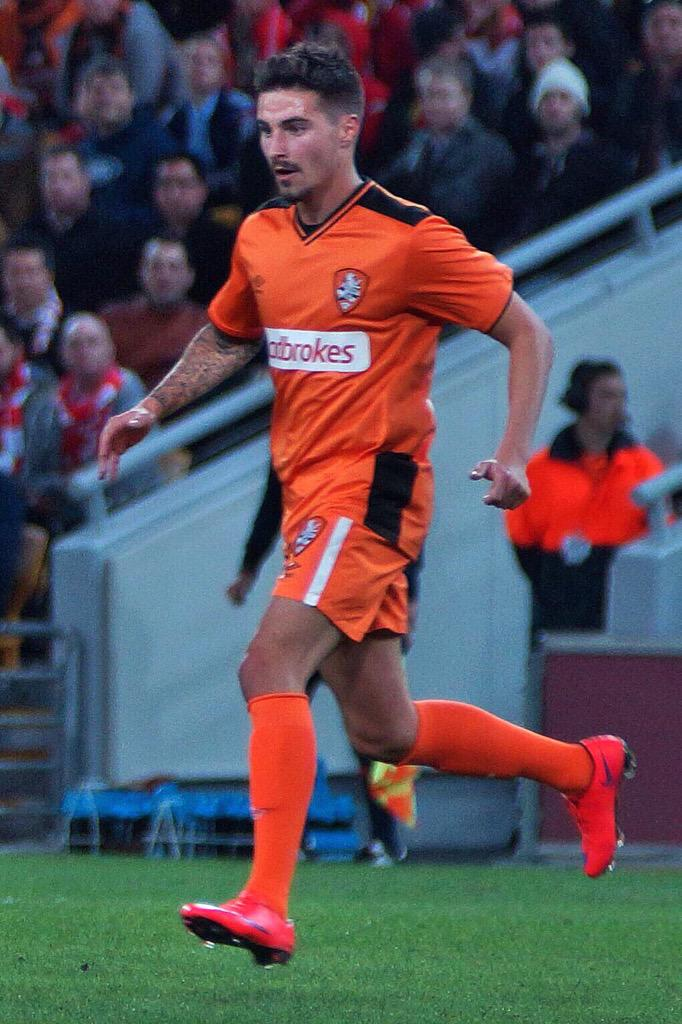
Maclaren playing for the Brisbane Roar in 2015

During the A-League off-season, on 5 July 2015, Brisbane Roar signed Maclaren to a two-year deal.

Maclaren made his debut with the Roar against the Western Sydney Wanderers on 8 October 2015. In the same game, he scored a brace for the Roar, with goals in the 9th and 34th minutes of the match. Later that season Maclaren reached his 50th senior A-League appearance, scoring a goal and assisting another against his former club, Perth Glory. He scored his second senior club hat-trick in a win against Melbourne Victory on 12 March 2016.

Maclaren finished the A-League regular season with 18 goals, second in the Golden Boot race to Melbourne City's Uruguayan striker Bruno Fornaroli, however his season tally was enough to become the all-time A-League record for an Australian player. Maclaren scored two more goals in the finals series to make his final club goal count 20 from 25 games. At the end of the 2015–16 season, he was awarded as the Young Player of the Year by the FFA.

Maclaren scored 19 goals for the Roar in the 2016–17 A-League regular season, tying with Besart Berisha for the Golden Boot.

=== Darmstadt 98 ===
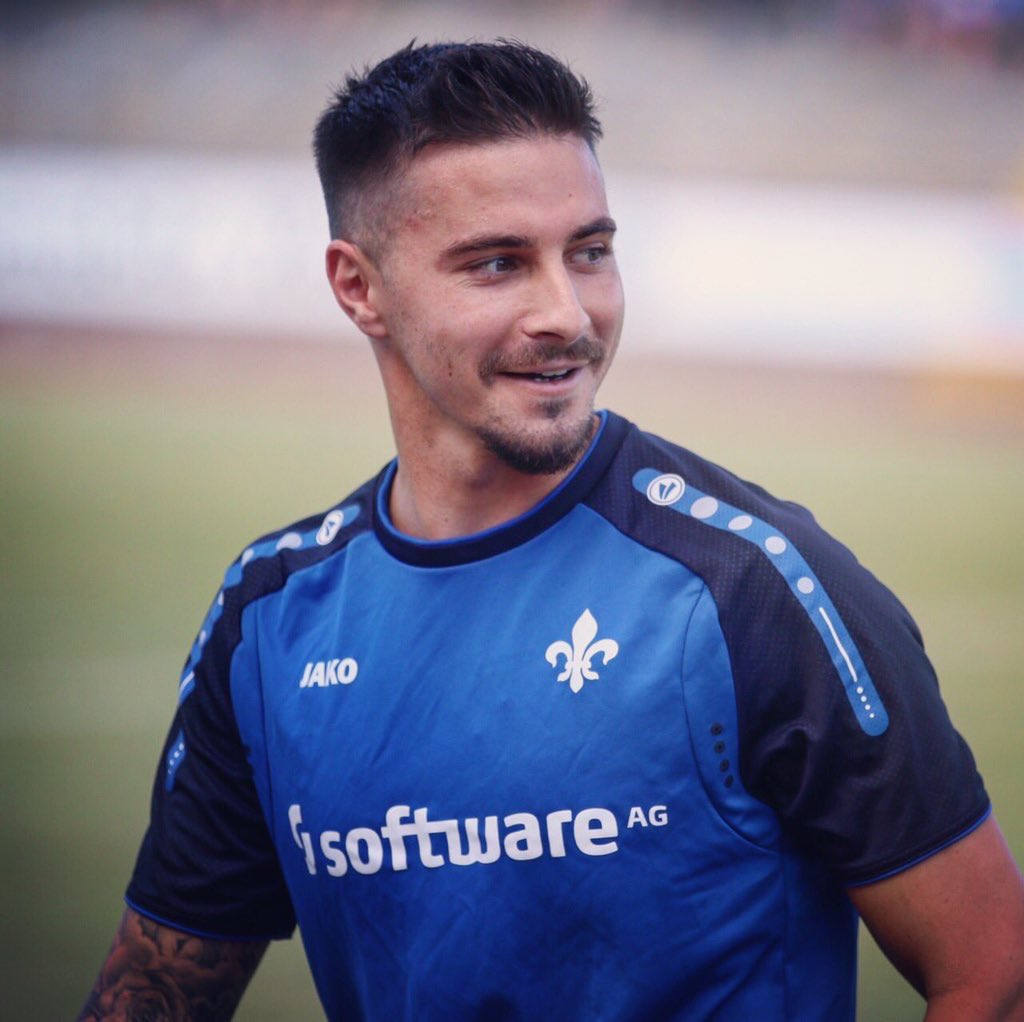
Maclaren with SV Darmstadt 98 in 2017

In May 2017, Maclaren joined German 2. Bundesliga club Darmstadt 98 signing a three-year deal. He made his debut in the second round of the season as a 63rd minute substitution in a 1–1 draw away to FC Kaiserslautern on 4 August.

==== Loans to Hibernian ====
Maclaren was loaned to Scottish club Hibernian in January 2018, in the hope that more playing time would boost his chances of being selected by Australia for the 2018 FIFA World Cup. He made his Scottish Premiership debut in a 1–0 win at Dundee on 24 January. Maclaren scored his first goal for Hibs on 3 February, converting a match-winning penalty against Rangers. He scored the second goal in a 2–0 win for Hibs in an Edinburgh derby on 9 March, and helped to delay Celtic's title celebrations by scoring the first goal in a 2–1 win for Hibs on 21 April. He ended his season in Scotland by scoring a hat-trick in a 5–5 draw with Rangers.

After the loan spell ended, Maclaren said that he hoped Darmstadt would make him available for transfer. On 3 August, Maclaren returned to Hibernian on a season-long loan. This spell was less productive, as Maclaren only scored one goal and he struggled to hold down a regular place in the starting lineup. Hibs terminated the loan on 31 January 2019.

=== Melbourne City ===
On 31 January 2019, Maclaren signed for A-League club Melbourne City on a marquee deal to see him at the club till May 2022. He scored in his first game for City with a backheel against Adelaide United on 9 February. He won the Golden Boot that season with 22 goals, three more than the nearest competitor, Adam Le Fondre.

On 6 March 2021, Maclaren scored and assisted two in Melbourne City's 6–0 away win over city rivals Melbourne Victory. On the next meeting on 17 April 2021, he became the first player to score five goals in the A-League regular season history, and just the second of all time, as the hosts won 7–0. He became Melbourne City's record goalscorer with 58 goals on 13 May 2021, when his team won 4–1 against Adelaide United at home overtaking Bruno Fornaroli.

After 5 and a half seasons at the club, on 30 April 2024 it was announced that Maclaren would leave Melbourne City at the conclusion of the 2023–24 A-League season, in the lead up to the club's elimination final against derby rivals Melbourne Victory.

Maclaren played his final match for Melbourne City in a Melbourne Derby elimination final against Melbourne Victory. Maclaren was substituted off in the 75th minute of the match, having registered just 8 touches in the match, as Melbourne City lost 3–2 on penalties after the match ended 1–1 in regulation time.

=== Mohun Bagan ===
In July 2024, Maclaren signed with Indian Super League club Mohun Bagan on a two-year deal. He made his debut for the club on 23 September, coming on as an 80th minute substitute in a 3–2 win against NorthEast United. Maclaren scored his first goal for Mohun Bagan on 5 October, heading the opening goal in the 8th minute of a 3–0 win over city rivals Mohammedan. In the following match on 19 October, he scored the opening goal in the Kolkata Derby against arch-rivals East Bengal. On 12 April 2025, he scored the extra time winner in a 2–1 victory over Bengaluru FC in the 2025 ISL Cup final, and was named the Player of the Match.

On 6 March 2026, Mclaren scored four goals in a 5–1 win over Odisha FC, his first ever ISL hat-trick.

== International career ==
=== Youth ===
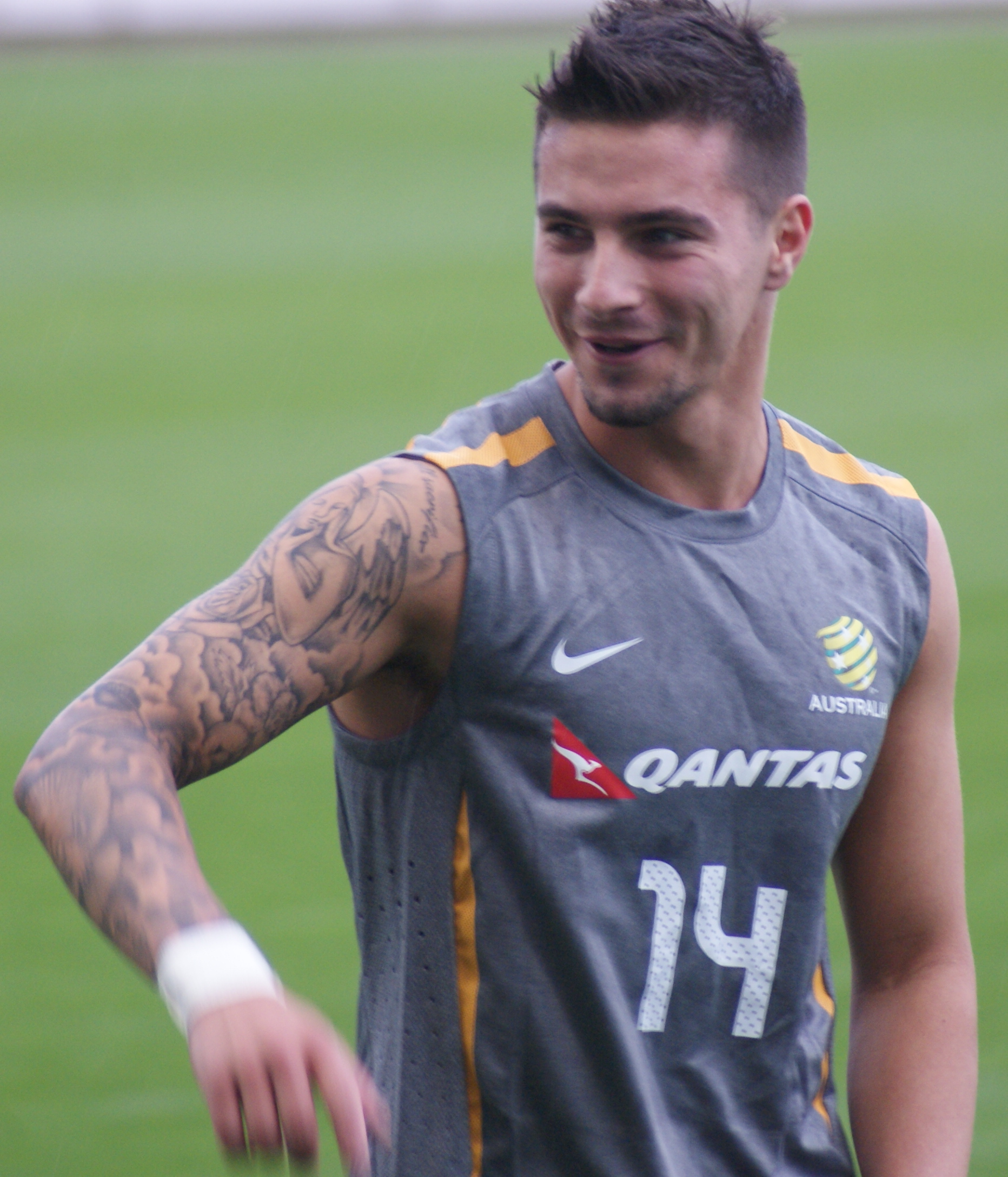
Maclaren with the Young Socceroos in 2013

==== Scotland ====
Maclaren international career started when he was called up for Scotland under-19, who he was eligible to play for through his father Donald. Maclaren made two appearances for the team, playing against Denmark and Norway. Maclaren was then involved with the Australian under-20 squad, and scored a goal against the hosts Turkey in the 2013 FIFA U-20 World Cup.

==== Australia ====
Maclaren joined the Australian under-23 team ("Olyroos") for 2016 AFC U-23 Championship qualification Group F games held in Taiwan in March 2015, which doubled as Olympic qualification. He played in two of the Olyroos' three games, scoring a hat-trick against Hong Kong and another two goals against Myanmar, achieving the second highest tally for the qualification stage out of the entire AFC. Maclaren was named in the Australian squad for the 2016 AFC U-23 Championship, where he played every minute of Australia's campaign in three games against the UAE, Vietnam and Jordan, scoring against Vietnam.

=== Senior ===
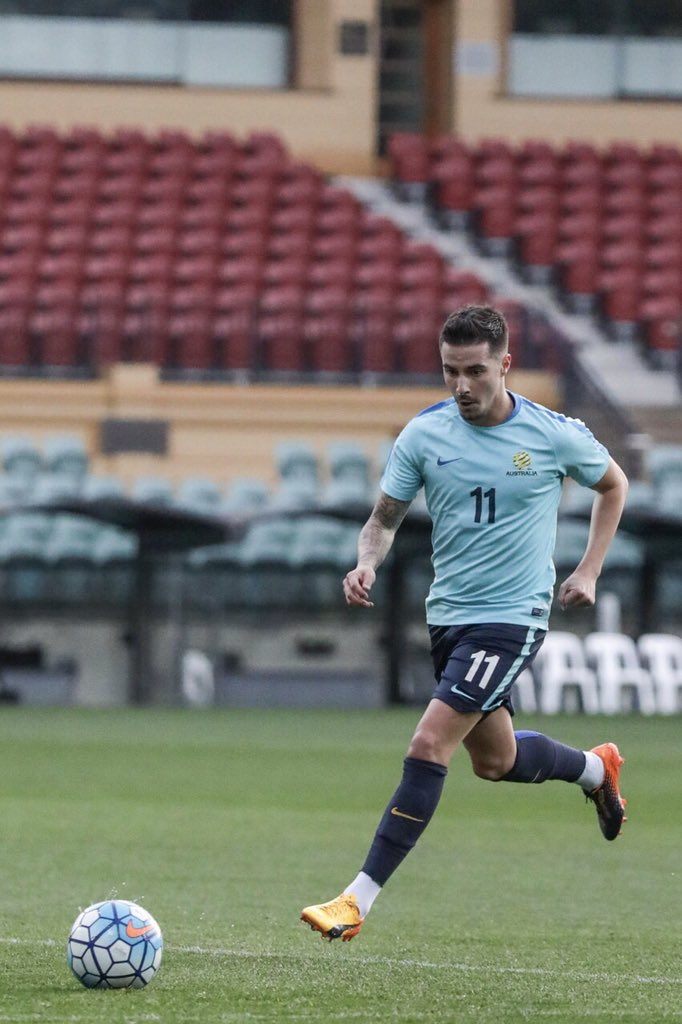
Maclaren training with Australia in 2017

In February 2016, Maclaren announced that and pledged to play for Australia rather than Scotland, but later expressed his pride at having been selected for the young Scots. In May 2016, Maclaren was called up to the Socceroos for the first time for a friendly match away to England, in which he started. After a solid start to the 2016–17 A-League season, Maclaren was called up again to the Socceroos squad in November 2016 for Australia's 2018 World Cup Qualifying Third Round match against Thailand in Bangkok. He started the match, playing 57 minutes in the eventual 2–2 draw before being substituted for Nathan Burns. He was again called up for the final two Round 3 matches in August and September 2017, coming on in the 71st minute of the crucial final match at home to Thailand, which the Socceroos won 2–1.

Maclaren dropped out of the Australia squad later in 2017, due to his lack of playing time at Darmstadt. A major factor in him seeking a loan move in January 2018 was to try and earn selection for the 2018 FIFA World Cup squad. He was named in a 32-man provisional squad for the World Cup, but was cut from the 26-man squad to go to a pre-tournament camp in Turkey. Following an injury to Tomi Juric, Maclaren was added to the training squad. He played in a preparatory friendly match against Czech Republic, and was selected in the final 23-man squad.

Incoming Socceroo coach Graham Arnold selected Maclaren in the Australian squad for the 2019 AFC Asian Cup. He came on as a 64th minute substitute in the only pre-tournament friendly against Oman, and started all three matches in the group stage; a loss against Jordan, having a potential equaliser ruled offside, the second match against Palestine, scoring his first international goal in the 18th minute with a header from a Tom Rogic cross, and the last game, a win against Syria. Maclaren continued in the starting XI for the Socceroos in the first knockout stage match, against Uzbekistan, playing the first 75 minutes before being replaced by Apostolos Giannou in the eventual win on penalties. He was named to start alongside Giannou in a changed two-striker formation in the Quarter-Final against hosts UAE.

On 10 October 2019, Maclaren scored his first international hat-trick in a 5–0 win against Nepal during the 2022 FIFA World Cup qualification.

On 16 November 2023, Maclaren scored his second international hat-trick during the 2026 FIFA World Cup qualification match against Bangladesh.

== Personal life ==
Maclaren holds a British passport, and is half-Maltese through his mother; this led to Malta approaching Maclaren to play for them, however, he turned down the request. His Scottish father Donald had a short career as a footballer with Dunfermline Athletic (after failing to break through at Heart of Midlothian) prior to emigrating to Australia, while his paternal uncle Ross MacLaren played in the English leagues with Shrewsbury Town, Derby County and Swindon Town.

Maclaren is a fan of Premier League club Aston Villa.

== Career statistics ==
=== Club ===
As of match played 5 November 2026

Appearances and goals by club, season and competition
Club	Season	League			National cup (Note: Includes FFA Cup, DFB-Pokal, Scottish Cup, AIFF Super Cup)		League cup (Note: Includes Scottish League Cup, Durand Cup)		Continental		Other		Total	
Club	Season	Division	Apps	Goals	Apps	Goals	Apps	Goals	Apps	Goals	Apps	Goals	Apps	Goals
Perth Glory	2013–14	A-League	18	2	—		—		—		—		18	2
Perth Glory	2014–15	A-League	20	9	2	0	—		—		—		22	9
Perth Glory	Total		38	11	2	0	—		—		—		40	11
Brisbane Roar	2015–16	A-League	25	20	1	0	—		—		—		26	20
Brisbane Roar	2016–17	A-League	28	20	1	0	—		6 (Note: Appearances in AFC Champions League)	3	—		35	23
Brisbane Roar	Total		53	40	2	0	—		6	3	—		61	43
Darmstadt 98	2017–18	2. Bundesliga	7	0	1	0	—		—		—		8	0
Darmstadt 98	Total		7	0	1	0	0	0	0	0	0	0	8	0
Hibernian (loan)	2017–18	Scottish Premiership	15	8	0	0	—		—		—		15	8
Hibernian (loan)	2018–19	Scottish Premiership	12	1	0	0	1	0	2 (Note: Appearances in UEFA Europa League)	0	—		15	1
Hibernian (loan)	Total		27	9	0	0	1	0	2	0	—		30	9
Melbourne City	2018–19	A-League Men	9	5	0	0	—		—		—		9	5
Melbourne City	2019–20	A-League Men	25	23	5	6	—		—		—		30	29
Melbourne City	2020–21	A-League Men	24	25	—		—		—		—		24	25
Melbourne City	2021–22	A-League Men	27	16	—		—		6	2	—		33	18
Melbourne City	2022–23	A-League Men	29	24	2	0	—		—		—		31	24
Melbourne City	2023–24	A-League Men	28	10	3	3	—		6	1	—		37	14
Melbourne City	Total		142	103	10	9	—		12	3	—		164	115
Mohun Bagan	2024–25	Indian Super League	25	12	–		–		–		—		25	12
Mohun Bagan	2025–26	Indian Super League	13	10	3	2	2	1	1 (Note: Appearance in AFC Champions League Two)	0	3 (Note: three appearances and two goals in IFA Shield)	2	22	15
Mohun Bagan	2026–27	Indian Super League	1	0	0	0	4	1	—		2 (Note: Appearances in IFA Shield)	0	7	1
Mohun Bagan	Total		39	22	3	2	6	2	1	0	5	2	54	28
Career total			306	185	18	11	7	2	21	6	5	2	357	206

=== International ===
As of match played 16 November 2023

Appearances and goals by national team and year
National team	Year	Apps	Goals
Australia	2016	2	0
Australia	2017	3	0
Australia	2018	3	0
Australia	2019	7	5
Australia	2021	4	1
Australia	2022	10	2
Australia	2023	2	3
Total		32	11

Scores and results list Australia's goal tally first, score column indicates score after each Maclaren goal.

List of international goals scored by Jamie Maclaren
No.	Date	Venue	Cap	Opponent	Score	Result	Competition
1	11 January 2019	Rashid Stadium, Dubai, United Arab Emirates	10	Palestine	1–0	3–0	2019 AFC Asian Cup
2	10 October 2019	Canberra Stadium, Canberra, Australia	14	Nepal	1–0	5–0	2022 FIFA World Cup qualification
3	10 October 2019	Canberra Stadium, Canberra, Australia	14	Nepal	2–0	5–0	2022 FIFA World Cup qualification
4	10 October 2019	Canberra Stadium, Canberra, Australia	14	Nepal	5–0	5–0	2022 FIFA World Cup qualification
5	15 October 2019	National Stadium, Kaohsiung, Taiwan	15	Chinese Taipei	6–1	7–1	2022 FIFA World Cup qualification
6	7 June 2021	Jaber Al-Ahmad International Stadium, Kuwait City, Kuwait	16	Chinese Taipei	2–0	5–1	2026 FIFA World Cup qualification
7	27 January 2022	Melbourne Rectangular Stadium, Melbourne, Australia	20	Vietnam	1–0	4–0	2022 FIFA World Cup qualification
8	1 February 2022	Sultan Qaboos Sports Complex, Muscat, Oman	21	Oman	1–0	2–2	2022 FIFA World Cup qualification
9	16 November 2023	Melbourne Rectangular Stadium, Melbourne, Australia	30	Bangladesh	5–0	7–0	2026 FIFA World Cup qualification
10	16 November 2023	Melbourne Rectangular Stadium, Melbourne, Australia	30	Bangladesh	6–0	7–0	2026 FIFA World Cup qualification
11	16 November 2023	Melbourne Rectangular Stadium, Melbourne, Australia	30	Bangladesh	7–0	7–0	2026 FIFA World Cup qualification

== Honours ==
Melbourne City

- A-League Men Premiership: 2020–21, 2021–22, 2022–23

Mohun Bagan

- Indian Super League Shield: 2024–25
- Indian Super League Cup: 2024–25
- IFA Shield: 2025, 2026

Individual

- A-League Young Footballer of the Year: 2015–16, 2016–17
- PFA A-League Team of the Season: 2015–16, 2019–20, 2020–21, 2021–22, 2022–23
- A-League Golden Boot: 2016–17, 2019–20, 2020–21, 2021–22 Aleague 2022-23 . 5 golden boots aleague
- Harry Kewell Medal: 2016
- A-Leagues All Star: 2022
