= Raymond Jellema =

Scottish footballer (born 1985)

Personal information
- Date of birth: 27 September 1985 (age 41)
- Place of birth: Irvine, Scotland
- Position: Goalkeeper

Youth career
- ?–2002: PrestAyr B.C.

Senior career*
Years	Team	Apps	(Gls)
2002–2007	Hamilton Academical	25	(0)
2007–2009	Alloa Athletic	70	(0)
2011–2012	Peterhead	21	(0)
2013–2014	Elgin City	26	(0)
- * Club domestic league appearances and goals as of 00:20, 6 April 2014 (UTC)

Raymond Jellema (born 27 September 1985) is a Scottish footballer who plays as a goalkeeper and is currently without a club after leaving Elgin City.

== Career ==
Raised in Ayr, he signed his first professional contract for Hamilton Academical during the 2002–03 season.

While appearances in the first season of his career were not forthcoming, Jellema made his debut appearance for the club in a Second Division match against his future team Alloa Athletic during Hamilton's promotion-winning 2003–04 season. Still the second choice goalkeeper during 2004–05, due to David McEwan's presence at the club during this time (strangely enough, McEwan himself would later join Alloa), Jellema made four First Division appearances during the 2005-06 campaign. Jellema became a regular first-team goalkeeper during the 2006–07 season, starting eighteen league games, as Hamilton finished in fourth position in the table.

As the 2007–08 season got under way, Jellema transferred to Alloa for free. After two seasons at Alloa, in the summer of 2009, Jellema moved to the Republic of the Congo, Africa where he spent two years working on and offshore with French Oil Company, Total.

Upon returning to Scotland, Jellema signed for Peterhead. He was released by the club in May 2012.

After a year without a club, Jellema signed for Elgin City on 19 July 2013. He left Elgin at the end of the 2013–14 season when his contract expired.

During 2014-15 season, Raymond was the goalkeeping coach at Banks O'Dee youth academy and Colin Cockles Goalkeeping academy in Aberdeen before moving to Luanda, Angola in Africa in 2015.

Raymond spent four years in Angola working as a Petroleum Engineer for TotalEnergies E&P Angola. While in Luanda, Raymond played and coached goalkeeping in various forms of the game (including futsal and beach football) at local football clubs, orphanages and youth academies. While in Angola, he dedicated his spare time to training for triathlons and qualified for the amateur level 70.3 World Championship Ironman (held in Nice, France) in 2019.

Raymond returned to Europe for the start of the season 2019-2020, where he became as a youth academy goalkeeping coach for Pau F.C. (French Ligue II) in Pau, South of France. During his time at Pau F.C., he obtained his UEFA B Goalkeeping Coaching Certificate from the Scottish Football Association (SFA). Raymond stayed at Pau F.C. until end of the 2023-24 season, where he moved with his family to Abu Dhabi in the UAE to work for Abu Dhabi National Oil Company (ADNOC).
