= 1985–86 Highland Football League =

Highland League
- Season: 1985–1986
- Champions: Forres Mechanics
- Matches: 272
- Goals: 906 (3.33 per match)
- Average goals/game: 3.33

The 1985–1986 Highland Football League featured 17 teams. Notable results included Caledonian 7 v 0 Inverness Thistle on Wednesday 2nd April.

It was won by Forres Mechanics for the first time, ahead of Elgin City.

== Teams ==
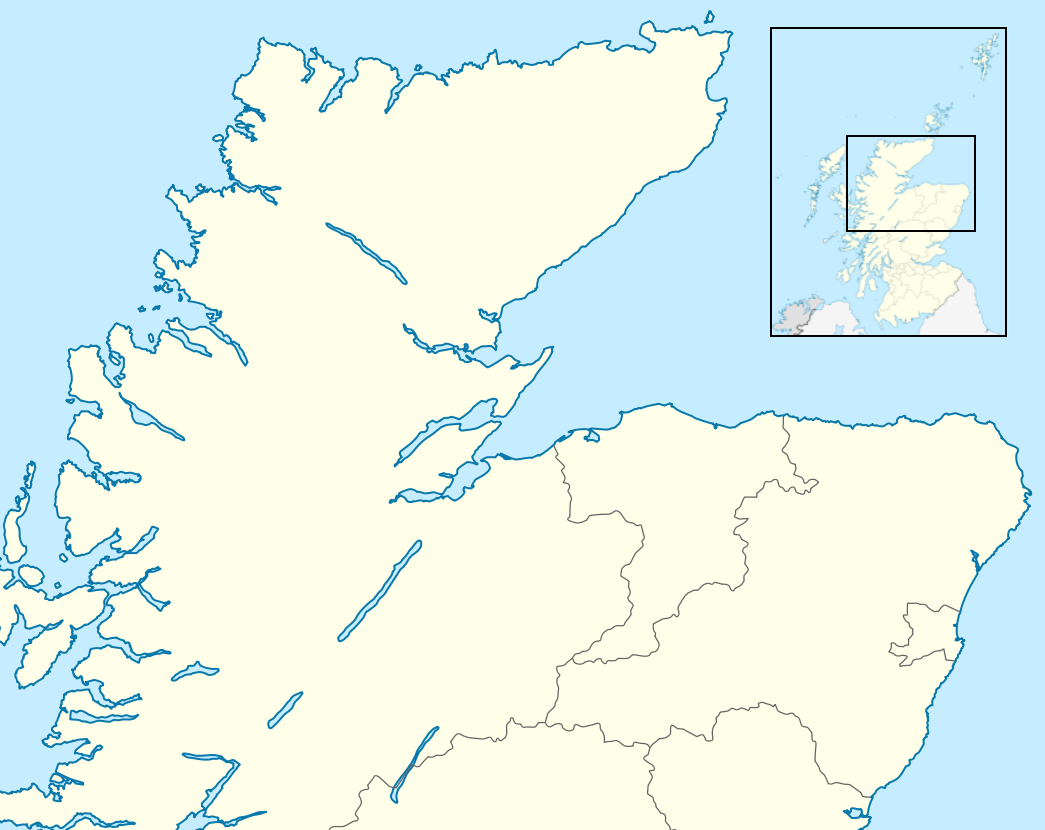
Location of teams in 1985–86 Highland Football League

== Table ==
Pos	Team	Pld	W	D	L	GF	GA	GD	Pts
1	Forres Mechanics (C)	32	22	6	4	77	27	+50	72
2	Elgin City	32	21	7	4	67	33	+34	70
3	Peterhead	32	22	3	7	70	32	+38	69
4	Inverness Caledonian	32	19	9	4	70	32	+38	66
5	Keith	32	17	5	10	66	40	+26	56
6	Huntly	32	15	8	9	58	45	+13	53
7	Buckie Thistle	32	14	8	10	48	36	+12	50
8	Inverness Thistle	32	12	9	11	56	53	+3	45
9	Nairn County	32	11	6	15	47	60	−13	39
10	Ross County	32	11	4	17	65	66	−1	37
11	Rothes	32	9	8	15	51	62	−11	35
12	Fort William	32	10	5	17	40	73	−33	35
13	Clachnacuddin	32	8	7	17	43	72	−29	31
14	Fraserburgh	32	8	6	18	40	60	−20	30
15	Lossiemouth	32	6	8	18	38	63	−25	26
16	Brora Rangers	32	6	5	21	39	74	−35	23
17	Deveronvale	32	4	10	18	31	65	−34	22

Source: Scottish Football Historical Archive - Highland League Final Tables
(C) Champions
