= Nicky Clark =

Scottish footballer (born 1991)

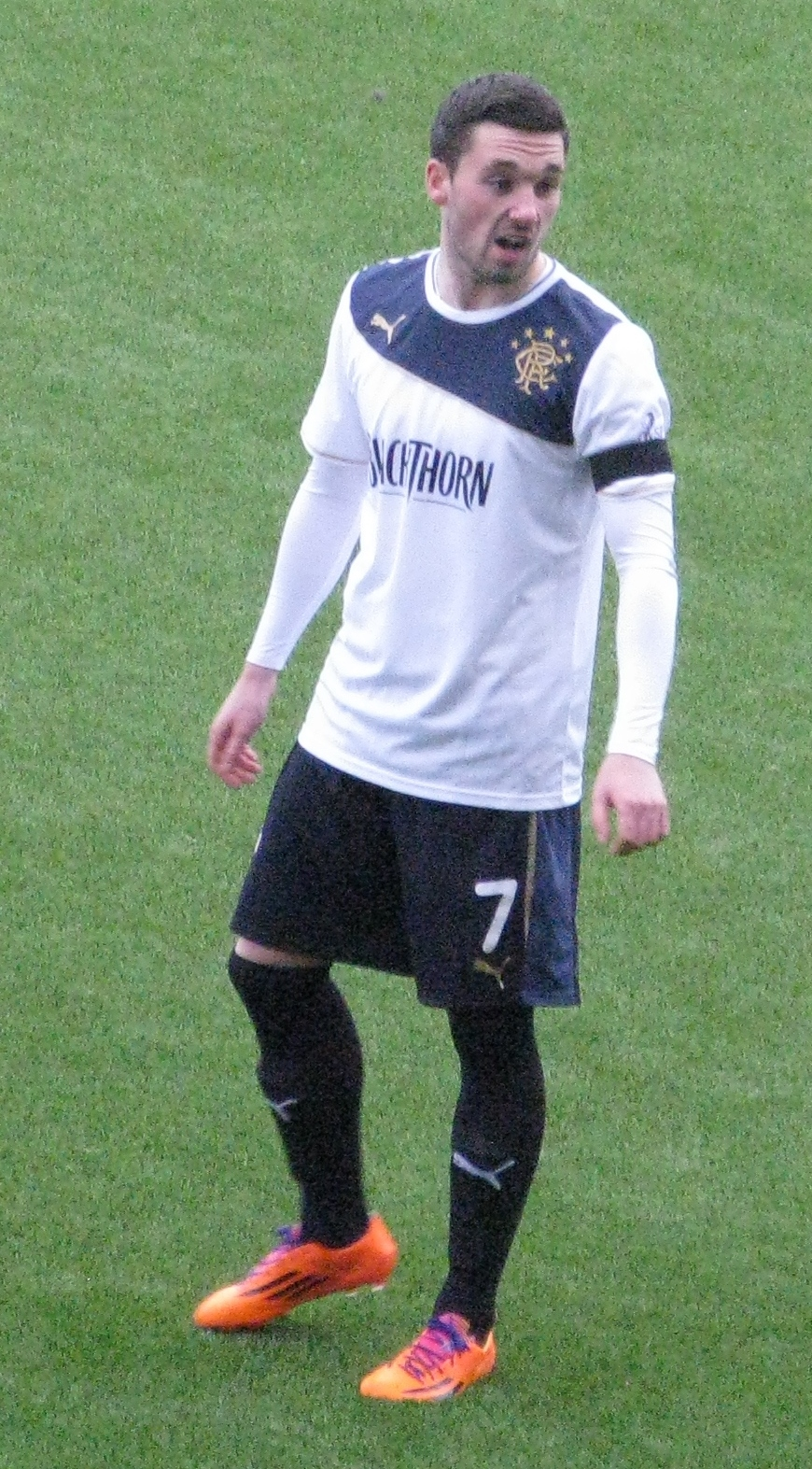
- Clark in 2013

Personal information
- Full name: Nicholas Alexander McCormack Clark
- Date of birth: 3 June 1991 (age 35)
- Place of birth: Bellshill, Scotland
- Height: 5 ft 10 in (1.78 m)
- Position: Striker

Team information
- Current team: Queen of the South (player-manager)
- Number: 88

Youth career
- 2003–2006: Rangers
- 2006–2009: Aberdeen

Senior career*
Years	Team	Apps	(Gls)
2009–2010	Aberdeen	0	(0)
2009–2010	→ Peterhead (loan)	23	(4)
2010–2011	Peterhead	24	(4)
2011–2013	Queen of the South	66	(32)
2013–2016	Rangers	78	(19)
2016	Bury	3	(0)
2016–2018	Dunfermline Athletic	62	(29)
2018–2022	Dundee United	114	(31)
2022–2025	St Johnstone	70	(17)
2025–2026	Ross County	9	(0)
2026–	Queen of the South	13	(5)

Managerial career
- 2026–: Queen of the South
- * Club domestic league appearances and goals as of 4 May 2026

Nicholas Alexander McCormack Clark (born 3 June 1991) is a Scottish professional footballer who plays as a striker and is the current player-manager of Scottish League One club Queen of the South. He is the son of the former Airdrieonians, Hearts, Rangers and West Ham striker Sandy Clark.

== Career ==
=== Early career ===
Clark began his career with the youth team of Rangers but was released at 15 and joined Aberdeen. He appeared as an unused substitute during the 2008–09 season and in early 2009, Clark signed a contract extension with the club.

=== Peterhead ===
To gain first team experience, Clark joined Peterhead on loan until January. Clark made his debut for the club on 19 September 2009, where he came on as a substitute in the 74th minute as Peterhead drew 1–1 with Arbroath. Clark's loan spell with Peterhead was extended until the end of the 2009–10 season. In the 2009–10 season, Clark would make twenty-five appearances and score four times. Clark, along with Jonathan Crawford, was released by the club after being told they wouldn't be offered a new contract.

After being released by Aberdeen, Clark joined Peterhead permanently in August 2010. Like his loan spell, Clark continued to be a first team regular for the club, where he made twenty-nine appearances and scored four times.

=== Queen of the South ===
He moved to Queen of the South in July 2011, signing a one-year contract extension in May 2012. The first season with Queen of the South was a struggle for Clark, as he failed to score his first goal, though it eventually happened in the second round of Scottish League Cup against Forfar Athletic.

The 2012–13 season was an improvement and breakthrough season for Clark after his dad, Sandy, joined the club as an assistant manager and he formed a striking partnership with Derek Lyle. Clark would score 41 goals in 46 appearances in all competitions, including scoring two hat-tricks against Stranraer and Forfar Athletic. Clark also played a role in winning the Challenge Cup Final when he scored the opener before Partick Thistle equalised, leading to a penalty shootout. Queen of the South would win the penalty shootout 6–5 to lift the cup. With the club also winning the Second Division, this gained the club their inaugural league and cup double.

Clark was the SFL Division 2 Player of the Year for the 2012–13 season, and he also won the Ginger Boot Award for being the top scorer across all four Scottish divisions. Clark was also named in the PFA Scotland Team of the Year for the Second Division alongside team-mates Chris Mitchell, Mark Durnan, Chris Higgins, Daniel Carmichael and Lee Robinson.

=== Rangers ===
In May 2013 he signed a three-year contract with Rangers, effective from 1 September 2013. The move was successful after Clark started talks with Ally McCoist. Ahead of the 2013–14 season, Clark expressed the opinion that playing in the Scottish League One would not be easy.

Clark scored on his debut on 31 August 2013 after 30 seconds, as Rangers won 5–0 against East Fife, just one day before the end of the club's transfer embargo. After the match, Clark said he believed the club could score 100 goals by the end of the season after scoring 18 goals at such an early stage. Clark initially struggled to make an impact, as he was often on the bench. This led to the Evening Times questioning whether Clark should become a first team starter. This continued until he scored four goals in a 6–1 win over Forfar Athletic on 3 December 2013. In the second half of the season, Clark suffered a broken foot that kept him out for five weeks. After his return, Clark scored in a 2–1 win over Brechin City on 23 March 2014.

On 3 May, Rangers became the first side in 116 years to go an entire league season unbeaten after a 1–1 draw with Dunfermline during which they clinched the Scottish League One championship. On 28 December 2015, Clark scored in the 65th minute in a crucial match against Hibernian, which put Rangers three points clear of Hibs.

On 23 May 2016, Clark was released by Rangers.

=== Bury ===
On 25 June 2016, Clark signed for Football League One side Bury on a two-year deal. Clark made his debut for Bury in a 2–0 victory over Charlton on 6 August 2016. However, after Bury signed James Vaughan from Birmingham City, Clark was deemed surplus to requirement and allowed to leave Gigg Lane, having made only four competitive appearances.

=== Dunfermline Athletic ===
Clark returned to Scotland after two months in England, signing for Scottish Championship side Dunfermline Athletic in August 2016 on a two-year deal. His move to the Pars saw Clark team up with his former manager at Queen of the South, Allan Johnston, as well as his father Sandy Clark who was also assistant to Johnston at the Doonhamers. Clark spent two seasons with the Pars, finishing top goalscorer for the club in both seasons, scoring 16 goals in his first and 21 goals in his second.

=== Dundee United ===
On 23 May 2018, after opting not to extend his contract with Dunfermline Athletic, Clark joined fellow Scottish Championship club Dundee United on a two-year contract. In his first season, he scored 15 goals in 36 competitive first team games.

During the 2019–20 season Clark played in a deeper role in the side. He signed an extended contract in January 2020, despite having suffered an ankle injury that required surgery.

On 14 January 2021, Clark signed a new contract with Dundee United, keeping him at the club until 2023.

=== St Johnstone ===
On 31 August 2022, Clark signed for St Johnstone for an undisclosed fee.

=== Queen of the South (second spell) ===
After a brief spell with Ross County, Clark signed for Queen of the South in January 2026.

On 25 May 2026, Clark was named player-manager of the Doonhamers. His father Sandy was made his assistant, a role Sandy had previously held at Queens while Allan Johnston was manager.

== Personal life ==
Clark was born in Bellshill and his father is the former Airdrieonians, Heart of Midlothian and Rangers striker, Sandy Clark.

== Career statistics ==
As of match played 28 February 2024

Club	Season	League			National Cup		League Cup		Other		Total	
Club	Season	Division	Apps	Goals	Apps	Goals	Apps	Goals	Apps	Goals	Apps	Goals
Aberdeen	2009–10	Scottish Premier League	0	0	0	0	0	0	0	0	0	0
Aberdeen	Total		0	0	0	0	0	0	0	0	0	0
Peterhead (loan)	2009–10	Scottish Second Division	23	4	2	0	0	0	0	0	25	4
Peterhead	2010–11	Scottish Second Division	24	4	3	0	1	0	1 (Note: Appearances in the Scottish Challenge Cup)	0	29	4
Queen of the South	2011–12	Scottish First Division	30	0	2	0	3	1	1	0	36	1
Queen of the South	2012–13	Scottish Second Division	36	32	2	2	3	3	5	4	46	41
Queen of the South	Total		66	32	4	2	6	4	6	4	82	42
Rangers	2013–14	Scottish League One	23	9	4	0	0	0	3	0	30	9
Rangers	2014–15	Scottish Championship	33	8	1	0	3	0	8 (Note: Two appearances in the Scottish Challenge Cup and six appearances and one goal in the Scottish Premiership play-offs)	1	45	9
Rangers	2015–16	Scottish Championship	22	2	4	1	2	1	4	2	32	6
Rangers	Total		78	19	9	1	5	1	15	3	107	24
Bury	2016–17	League One	3	0	0	0	1	0	0	0	4	0
Dunfermline Athletic	2016–17	Scottish Championship	30	15	4	1	0	0	3	0	37	16
Dunfermline Athletic	2017–18	Scottish Championship	32	14	2	1	3	4	4 (Note: Two appearances and two goals in the Scottish Challenge Cup and two appearances in the Scottish Premiership play-offs)	2	41	21
Dunfermline Athletic	Total		62	29	6	2	3	4	7	2	78	37
Dundee United	2018–19	Scottish Championship	25	8	3	2	4	3	4 (Note: Appearances in the Scottish Premiership play-offs)	2	36	15
Dundee United	2019–20	Scottish Championship	18	7	0	0	3	0	1	0	22	7
Dundee United	2020–21	Scottish Premiership	31	8	4	1	3	2	0	0	38	11
Dundee United	2021–22	Scottish Premiership	37	8	3	0	6	2	0	0	46	10
Dundee United	2022–23	Scottish Premiership	3	0	0	0	0	0	1	0	4	0
Dundee United	Total		114	31	10	3	16	7	6	2	146	43
St Johnstone	2022-23	Scottish Premiership	20	4	1	0	0	0	0	0	21	4
St Johnstone	2023–24	Scottish Premiership	12	5	1	0	0	0	0	0	13	5
St Johnstone	Total		32	9	2	0	0	0	0	0	34	9
Career total			402	128	36	8	32	16	35	11	505	163

=== Managerial record ===
As of match played 14 November 2026

Team	From	To	Record				
Team	From	To	G	W	D	L	Win %
Queen of the South	25 May 2026	present	25	8	4	13	32.00
Total			25	8	4	13	32.00

== Honours ==
Queen of the South

- Scottish Challenge Cup: 2012–13
- Scottish Second Division: 2012–13

Rangers

- Scottish Championship: 2015–16
- Scottish League One: 2013–14
- Scottish Challenge Cup: 2015–16

Dundee United

- Scottish Championship: 2019–20
