= Callum MacDonald =

Scottish footballer

Personal information
- Date of birth: 31 May 1983 (age 43)
- Place of birth: Perth, Scotland
- Position: Defender

Youth career
- –2003: Dundee

Senior career*
Years	Team	Apps	(Gls)
2003–2007	Dundee	72	(1)
2002–2003	→ Peterhead (loan)	29	(3)
2007–2014	Peterhead	120	(11)
2016	Gartcairn		
2016–2017	Montrose	16	(0)
2018	Albion Rovers	1	(0)
2018–2019	Edusport Academy		
- * Club domestic league appearances and goals as of 12:00, 3 July 2019 (UTC)

Callum MacDonald (born 31 May 1983 in Perth) is a Scottish footballer who last played as a defender for Edusport Academy.

During his career, MacDonald has played for Dundee, Peterhead and Montrose.
