= 2013–14 Queen of the South F.C. season =

Queen of the South
2013–14 season
- Chairman: Billy Hewitson
- Manager: Jim McIntyre
- Stadium: Palmerston Park
- Scottish Championship: 4th
- Challenge Cup: Third round
- League Cup: Third round
- Scottish Cup: Fourth round replay
- Top goalscorer: League: Iain Russell (13); All: Derek Lyle (14); Iain Russell (14)
- Highest home attendance: 2,644 vs. Dundee, 10 August 2013
- Lowest home attendance: 1,476 vs. Alloa Athletic, 11 January 2014
- Average home league attendance: 1,724

The 2013–14 season was Queen of the South's first season back in the second tier of Scottish football and their first season in the newly established Scottish Championship, having been promoted as champions from the Scottish Second Division at the end of the 2012–13 season. Queens also competed in the Challenge Cup, League Cup and the Scottish Cup.

== Summary ==
Queen of the South finished fourth in the Scottish Championship. Their league position qualified the club for the quarter-final stage of the Scottish Premiership play-offs where they were defeated 4-3 on aggregate by Falkirk over two legs.

The club reached the third round of the Challenge Cup, the third round of the League Cup and the fourth round of the Scottish Cup.

=== Management ===
The club were managed by Jim McIntyre, alongside his assistant Gerry McCabe for the 2013–14 season, following the departures of Allan Johnston and Sandy Clark who left to become the new manager and assistant of Scottish Premiership side Kilmarnock. On 9 June 2014 McCabe left to become the new assistant manager at newly promoted Scottish Premiership side Dundee under Paul Hartley.

== Results & fixtures ==
Win Draw Loss Abandoned or Postponed

=== Preseason ===
6 July 2013 Friendly	Queen's Park	1 – 2	Queen of the South	Lesser Hampden
15:00		QOSFC Report	Lyle; Splaine	Attendance: Closed doors

10 July 2013 Friendly	Clyde	2 – 5	Queen of the South	Broadwood Stadium
19:30		QOSFC Report	Carmichael; Burns; Russell	Attendance: Closed doors

13 July 2013 Friendly	Annan Athletic	0 – 2	Queen of the South	Galabank
15:00		QOSFC Report	Russell 21' (pen.); Paton 39'	Attendance: 710

20 July 2013 Friendly	Queen of the South	0 – 0	Heart of Midlothian	Palmerston Park
15:00		QOSFC Report		Attendance: 1,428; Referee: Norris

24 July 2013 Friendly	Queen of the South	4 – 2	St Mirren	Palmerston Park
19:30	McKenna 23'; Paton 51' (pen.); Lyle 72', 88'	QOSFC Report	Harkins 47'; Teale 67'	Attendance: 750; Referee: Murray

=== Scottish Championship ===
10 August 2013 ScoChamp Match 1	Queen of the South	4 – 3	Dundee	Palmerston Park
15:00	Lyle 45'; McGuffie 59' (pen.); Russell 63'; Paton 70'	QOSFC Report	MacDonald 8'; Gallagher 80'; Davidson 89'	Attendance: 2,644; Referee: Colvin

17 August 2013 ScoChamp Match 2	Livingston	3 – 3	Queen of the South	Energy Assets Arena
15:00	Denholm 12'; Fordyce 58'; Hastings (yellow card) 45' (yellow-red card) 72'; Mullen 80'	QOSFC Report	Russell 38'; McGuffie 44' (pen.); Reilly 86'	Attendance: 1,149; Referee: Muir

24 August 2013 ScoChamp Match 3	Hamilton Academical	2 – 0	Queen of the South	New Douglas Park
15:00	MacKinnon 39'; Ryan 80'	QOSFC Report		Attendance: 1,367; Referee: McLean

31 August 2013 ScoChamp Match 4	Queen of the South	0 – 0	Alloa Athletic	Palmerston Park
15:00		QOSFC Report		Attendance: 1,607; Referee: Anderson

14 September 2013 ScoChamp Match 5	Queen of the South	0 – 1	Raith Rovers	Palmerston Park
15:00	Durnan (red card) 78'	QOSFC Report	Spence 18'	Attendance: 1,620; Referee: D Robertson

21 September 2013 ScoChamp Match 6	Greenock Morton	0 – 2	Queen of the South	Cappielow Park
15:00		QOSFC Report	Russell 45'; Lyle 59'	Attendance: 1,826; Referee: Finnie

28 September 2013 ScoChamp Match 7	Queen of the South	1 – 2	Dumbarton	Palmerston Park
15:00	Russell 26'	QOSFC Report	Turner 19'; Fleming 87'	Attendance: 1,693; Referee: Clancy

5 October 2013 ScoChamp Match 8	Falkirk	2 – 1	Queen of the South	Falkirk Stadium
15:00	Loy 33' (pen.), 85'	QOSFC Report	Russell 57'	Attendance: 3,189; Referee: Beaton

12 October 2013 ScoChamp Match 9	Queen of the South	1 – 1	Cowdenbeath	Palmerston Park
15:00	Dowie 85'	QOSFC Report	Stewart 11'	Attendance: 1,514; Referee: Dallas

19 October 2013 ScoChamp Match 10	Dundee	2 – 1	Queen of the South	Dens Park
15:00	MacDonald 78'; Beattie 89'	QOSFC Report	Lyle 80'	Attendance: 4,357; Referee: McLean

26 October 2013 ScoChamp Match 11	Alloa Athletic	0 – 3	Queen of the South	Recreation Park
15:00		QOSFC Report	Russell 16', 71'; Reilly 75'	Attendance: 724; Referee: Colvin

9 November 2013 ScoChamp Match 12	Queen of the South	0 – 1	Hamilton Academical	Palmerston Park
15:00		QOSFC Report	Antoine-Curier 16'	Attendance: 1,557; Referee: Salmond

16 November 2013 ScoChamp Match 13	Queen of the South	2 – 0	Greenock Morton	Palmerston Park
15:00	Reilly 6'; McShane 18'	QOSFC Report		Attendance: 1,685; Referee: Allan

23 November 2013 ScoChamp Match 14	Raith Rovers	2 – 1	Queen of the South	Stark's Park
15:00	Elliot 63', 87'	QOSFC Report	Reilly 62'	Attendance: 1,497; Referee: Northcroft

7 December 2013 ScoChamp Match 15	Dumbarton	0 – 1	Queen of the South	Bet Butler Stadium
15:00		QOSFC Report	Russell 15'	Attendance: 824; Referee: Colvin

14 December 2013 ScoChamp	Queen of the South	A – A	Falkirk	Palmerston Park
15:00		BBC Sport		Referee: Brines
Note: Abandoned due to high winds

21 December 2013 ScoChamp Match 16	Queen of the South	2 – 2	Livingston	Palmerston Park
15:00	Paton 17'; Durnan 45'	QOSFC Report	McNulty 4', 77'	Attendance: 1,523; Referee: Cook

28 December 2013 ScoChamp Match 17	Cowdenbeath	0 – 2	Queen of the South	Central Park
15:00		QOSFC Report	Burns 45'; Russell 64'	Attendance: 556; Referee: O'Reilly

4 January 2014 ScoChamp Match 18	Hamilton Academical	3 – 1	Queen of the South	New Douglas Park
15:00	Longridge 4'; Antoine-Curier 9'; Crawford 58'	QOSFC Report	Russell 22'	Attendance: 1,366; Referee: Murray

11 January 2014 ScoChamp Match 19	Queen of the South	3 – 1	Alloa Athletic	Palmerston Park
15:00	Paton 30'; Reilly 34'; Lyle 56'	QOSFC Report	Caldwell 62'	Attendance: 1,476; Referee: Finnie

18 January 2014 ScoChamp Match 20	Queen of the South	1 – 0	Raith Rovers	Palmerston Park
15:00	McShane 25'	QOSFC Report		Attendance: 1,538; Referee: Dallas

25 January 2014 ScoChamp	Greenock Morton	A – A	Queen of the South	Cappielow Park
15:00		BBC Sport		Referee: D Robertson
Note: Abandoned due to death of spectator

29 January 2014 ScoChamp Match 21	Greenock Morton	1 – 1	Queen of the South	Cappielow Park
19:30	Campbell 86'	QOSFC Report	Russell 44' (red card) 51'; Higgins (red card) 45'	Attendance: 2,341; Referee: Anderson

1 February 2014 ScoChamp Match 22	Livingston	1 – 2	Queen of the South	Energy Assets Arena
15:00	McNulty 40' (pen.)	QOSFC Report	Durnan 55'; Lyle 79'	Attendance: 1,041; Referee: Aitken

8 February 2014 ScoChamp Match 23	Queen of the South	2 – 0	Falkirk	Palmerston Park
15:00	Reilly 81', 86'	QOSFC Report		Attendance: 1,818; Referee: Brines

15 February 2014 ScoChamp Match 24	Queen of the South	0 – 1	Dundee	Palmerston Park
15:00		QOSFC Report	Conroy 45' (pen.)	Attendance: 2,152; Referee: Cook

22 February 2014 ScoChamp Match 25	Falkirk	1 – 0	Queen of the South	Falkirk Stadium
15:00	Millar 90' (pen.)	QOSFC Report		Attendance: 2,862; Referee: Colvin

1 March 2014 ScoChamp Match 26	Queen of the South	3 – 1	Dumbarton	Palmerston Park
15:00	Durnan 30'; Reilly 45'; McHugh 66'	QOSFC Report	Miller 71'	Attendance: 1,604; Referee: McLean

8 March 2014 ScoChamp Match 27	Queen of the South	1 – 1	Hamilton Academical	Palmerston Park
15:00	Reilly 63'	QOSFC Report	Canning 56'	Attendance: 1,703; Referee: McKendrick

15 March 2014 ScoChamp Match 28	Alloa Athletic	0 – 1	Queen of the South	Recreation Park
15:00		QOSFC Report	Dowie 18'	Attendance: 644; Referee: Dallas

22 March 2014 ScoChamp Match 29	Queen of the South	2 – 1	Cowdenbeath	Palmerston Park
15:00	Higgins 16'; Reilly 33'	QOSFC Report	Stewart 90'	Attendance: 1,619; Referee: Charleston

25 March 2014 ScoChamp Match 30	Dundee	1 – 0	Queen of the South	Dens Park
19:45	Davidson 58'	QOSFC Report		Attendance: 3,999; Referee: Anderson

29 March 2014 ScoChamp Match 31	Queen of the South	3 – 0	Greenock Morton	Palmerston Park
15:00	Higgins 9'; Lyle 49'; Reilly 81'	QOSFC Report		Attendance: 1,487; Referee: Brines

12 April 2014 ScoChamp Match 32	Queen of the South	1 – 2	Falkirk	Palmerston Park
15:00	Reilly 67'	QOSFC Report	Alston 59'; Beck 61'; Flynn (red card) 68'	Attendance: 1,863; Referee: Allan

15 April 2014 ScoChamp Match 33	Raith Rovers	3 – 2	Queen of the South	Stark's Park
19:45	Cardle 4'; Watson 7'; Baird 81'; Donaldson (yellow card) 64' (yellow-red card) 85'	QOSFC Report	Durnan 37', 45'	Attendance: 993; Referee: Aitken

19 April 2014 ScoChamp Match 34	Dumbarton	0 – 3	Queen of the South	Bet Butler Stadium
15:00		QOSFC Report	Russell 17'; Lyle 52'; Holt 66'	Attendance: 1,263; Referee: Graham

26 April 2014 ScoChamp Match 35	Queen of the South	2 – 0	Livingston	Palmerston Park
15:00	McShane 25'; Russell 54'	QOSFC Report		Attendance: 1,923; Referee: D Robertson

3 May 2014 ScoChamp Match 36	Cowdenbeath	1 – 1	Queen of the South	Central Park
15:00	Hemmings 76'	QOSFC Report	McHugh 90'	Attendance: 1,053; Referee: McKendrick

=== Premiership play-offs ===
6 May 2014 Quarter Final 1st Leg	Queen of the South	2 – 1	Falkirk	Palmerston Park
19:45	McHugh 56', 90'	QOSFC Report	Alston 8'	Attendance: 1,996; Referee: McKendrick

10 May 2014 Quarter Final 2nd Leg	Falkirk	3 – 1 (a.e.t.) (4 – 3 agg.)	Queen of the South	Falkirk Stadium
15:00	Loy 53'; Sibbald 70'; Alston 118'	QOSFC Report	McHugh 36'	Attendance: 4,427; Referee: Murray

=== Scottish Challenge Cup ===
27 July 2013 Round 1	Queen of the South	4 – 0	Spartans	Palmerston Park
15:00	McKenna 12', 23'; Lyle 18'; Holt 68'	QOSFC Report		Attendance: 1,224; Referee: D Robertson

20 August 2013 Round 2	Airdrieonians	0 – 2	Queen of the South	Excelsior Stadium
19:45		QOSFC Report	Lyle 45', 64'	Attendance: 637; Referee: McKendrick

17 September 2013 Round 3	Queen of the South	0 – 3	Rangers	Palmerston Park
19:45	Higgins (yellow card) 27' (yellow-red card) 75'	QOSFC Report	Mohsni 7'; Daly 75'; McCulloch 83'	Attendance: 6,155; Referee: Murray

=== Scottish League Cup ===
3 August 2013 Round 1	Queen of the South	3 – 0	Annan Athletic	Palmerston Park
15:00	Lyle 59', 67', 69'	QOSFC Report	Watson (yellow card) 48' (yellow-red card) 58'	Attendance: 1,588; Referee: P Robertson

27 August 2013 Round 2	Queen of the South	2 – 1 (a.e.t.)	St Mirren	Palmerston Park
19:45	McKenna 103'; Paton 115'	QOSFC Report	Thompson 95'	Attendance: 2,073; Referee: Charleston

25 September 2013 Round 3	Heart of Midlothian	3 – 3 (a.e.t.) (4 – 2 p)	Queen of the South	Tynecastle Stadium
19:45	McHattie 14'; Hamill 51' (pen.); Wilson 93'	QOSFC Report	McGuffie 20'; Paton 62'; Higgins 116'	Attendance: 8,381; Referee: McKendrick
	Penalties
	McGhee (penalty scored); Hamill (penalty missed); McGowan (penalty scored); King (penalty scored); Carrick (penalty scored)		(penalty scored) Lyle; (penalty missed) Mitchell; (penalty missed) Paton; (penalty scored) Dzierzawski

=== Scottish Cup ===
2 November 2013 Round 3	Queen of the South	1 – 0	Hamilton Academical	Palmerston Park
15:00	Lyle 64'	QOSFC Report		Attendance: 1,324; Referee: Finnie

30 November 2013 Round 4	Queen of the South	2 – 2	St Mirren	Palmerston Park
15:00	Russell 35'; Paton 72'	QOSFC Report	Newton 9'; Thompson 51'	Attendance: 2,176; Referee: Clancy

10 December 2013 Round 4 Replay	St Mirren	3 – 0	Queen of the South	St Mirren Park
19:45	Harkins 19'; Thompson 74'; Kelly 87'	QOSFC Report		Attendance: 2,775; Referee: Allan

== Player statistics ==
=== Captains ===
No.	P	Name	Country	No. games	Notes
	DF	Chris Higgins	(Scotland)	33	Club Captain
	MF	Stephen McKenna	(Scotland)	7	Vice Captain
	DF	Ryan McGuffie	(Scotland)	1	Vice Captain
	DF	Mark Durnan	(Scotland)	6	Vice Captain

Last updated: 10 May 2014
Source: Competitive match reports.
Competitive matches only
Matches started as captain only
Country: FIFA nationality; No.: Squad number; P: Position; Name: Player name; No. Games: Number of games started as captain.

=== Squad ===
Last updated 10 May 2014

No.	Pos	Nat	Player	Total		Scottish Championship		Other^{[a]}		League Cup		Scottish Cup	
No.	Pos	Nat	Player	Apps	Goals	Apps	Goals	Apps	Goals	Apps	Goals	Apps	Goals
	GK	(Wales) WAL	Calum Antell	16	0	9+1	0	3+0	0	3+0	0	0+0	0
	GK	(Scotland) SCO	Zander Clark	29	0	24+0	0	2+0	0	0+0	0	3+0	0
	GK	(England) ENG	James Atkinson	4	0	3+1	0	0+0	0	0+0	0	0+0	0
	DF	(Scotland) SCO	Scott Hooper	1	0	1+0	0	0+0	0	0+0	0	0+0	0
	DF	(Scotland) SCO	Mark Durnan	35	5	28+0	5	3+0	0	1+0	0	3+0	0
	DF	(Scotland) SCO	Chris Higgins	34	3	25+1	2	3+0	0	2+0	1	3+0	0
	DF	(Scotland) SCO	Ryan McGuffie	15	3	9+1	2	2+0	0	2+1	1	0+0	0
	DF	(Scotland) SCO	Chris Mitchell	40	0	31+0	0	3+0	0	2+1	0	3+0	0
	DF	(Scotland) SCO	Andy Dowie	36	2	27+1	2	5+0	0	3+0	0	0+0	0
	DF	(Scotland) SCO	Kevin Holt	41	2	28+2	1	5+0	1	3+0	0	3+0	0
	DF	(Scotland) SCO	Lewis Kidd	6	0	1+3	0	1+1	0	0+0	0	0+0	0
	MF	(United States) USA	Kevin Dzierzawski	18	0	10+4	0	0+2	0	1+0	0	1+0	0
	MF	(Scotland) SCO	Paul Burns	31	1	22+3	1	2+0	0	2+0	0	2+0	0
	MF	(Scotland) SCO	Mark Kerr	13	0	10+1	0	2+0	0	0+0	0	0+0	0
	MF	(Scotland) SCO	Daniel Carmichael	33	0	9+16	0	2+2	0	1+1	0	2+0	0
	MF	(Scotland) SCO	Ian McShane	38	3	24+4	3	4+1	0	1+1	0	3+0	0
	MF	(Scotland) SCO	Stephen McKenna	30	3	17+6	0	3+0	2	2+0	1	2+0	0
	MF	(Scotland) SCO	Dan Orsi	2	0	0+1	0	0+0	0	0+1	0	0+0	0
	MF	(Scotland) SCO	Patrick Slattery	1	0	0+0	0	0+1	0	0+0	0	0+0	0
	MF	(Scotland) SCO	Derek Young	23	0	12+4	0	2+2	0	2+0	0	1+0	0
	FW	(Scotland) SCO	Iain Russell	45	14	28+6	13	4+1	0	2+1	0	3+0	1
	FW	(Scotland) SCO	Derek Lyle	46	14	25+10	7	4+1	3	3+0	3	1+2	1
	FW	(Scotland) SCO	Gavin Reilly	41	12	19+14	12	0+3	0	0+3	0	2+0	0
	FW	(Scotland) SCO	Michael Paton	38	6	24+6	3	3+0	0	3+0	2	1+1	1
	FW	(Scotland) SCO	Aidan Smith	0	0	0+0	0	0+0	0	0+0	0	0+0	0
	FW	(Scotland) SCO	Robert McHugh	15	5	10+3	2	2+0	3	0+0	0	0+0	0

a. Includes other competitive competitions, including the play-offs and the Challenge Cup.

=== Disciplinary record ===
Includes all competitive matches.

Last updated 10 May 2014

Nation	Position	Name	Scottish Championship		Other		League Cup		Scottish Cup		Total	
Nation	Position	Name	Yellow card	Red card	Yellow card	Red card	Yellow card	Red card	Yellow card	Red card	Yellow card	Red card
(Wales)	GK	Calum Antell	0	0	0	0	0	0	0	0	0	0
(Scotland)	GK	Zander Clark	0	0	1	0	0	0	0	0	1	0
(England)	GK	James Atkinson	0	1	0	0	0	0	0	0	0	1
(Scotland)	DF	Scott Hooper	0	0	0	0	0	0	0	0	0	0
(Scotland)	DF	Mark Durnan	6	1	1	0	0	0	0	0	7	1
(Scotland)	DF	Chris Higgins	6	1	2	1	0	0	0	0	8	2
(Scotland)	DF	Ryan McGuffie	2	0	0	0	1	0	0	0	3	0
(Scotland)	DF	Chris Mitchell	6	0	0	0	0	0	1	0	7	0
(Scotland)	DF	Andy Dowie	3	0	0	0	0	0	0	0	3	0
(Scotland)	DF	Kevin Holt	4	0	1	0	1	0	0	0	6	0
(Scotland)	DF	Lewis Kidd	0	0	1	0	0	0	0	0	1	0
(United States)	MF	Kevin Dzierzawski	1	0	0	0	0	0	0	0	1	0
(Scotland)	MF	Paul Burns	6	0	0	0	0	0	0	0	6	0
(Scotland)	MF	Mark Kerr	1	0	0	0	0	0	0	0	1	0
(Scotland)	MF	Daniel Carmichael	1	0	0	0	0	0	0	0	1	0
(Scotland)	MF	Ian McShane	4	0	0	0	0	0	0	0	4	0
(Scotland)	MF	Stephen McKenna	6	0	0	0	1	0	0	0	7	0
(Scotland)	MF	Dan Orsi	0	0	0	0	0	0	0	0	0	0
(Scotland)	MF	Patrick Slattery	0	0	0	0	0	0	0	0	0	0
(Scotland)	MF	Derek Young	2	0	0	0	0	0	0	0	2	0
(Scotland)	FW	Iain Russell	5	1	0	0	2	0	1	0	8	1
(Scotland)	FW	Derek Lyle	6	0	0	0	0	0	1	0	7	0
(Scotland)	FW	Gavin Reilly	0	0	0	0	0	0	0	0	0	0
(Scotland)	FW	Michael Paton	2	0	0	0	0	0	0	0	2	0
(Scotland)	FW	Aidan Smith	0	0	0	0	0	0	0	0	0	0
(Scotland)	FW	Robert McHugh	0	0	0	0	0	0	0	0	0	0

=== Clean sheets ===
R	Pos	Nat	Name	Scottish Championship	Other	League Cup	Scottish Cup	Total
1	GK	(Wales)	Calum Antell	2	2	1	0	5
2	GK	(Scotland)	Zander Clark	9	0	0	1	10
3	GK	(England)	James Atkinson	1	0	0	0	1
			Totals	12	2	1	1	16

Last updated: 10 May 2014
Source: Match reports in Competitive matches

=== Top Scorers ===
Last updated on 10 May 2014

Position	Nation	Name	Scottish Championship	Other	League Cup	Scottish Cup	Total
1	(Scotland)	Derek Lyle	7	3	3	1	14
=	(Scotland)	Iain Russell	13	0	0	1	14
3	(Scotland)	Gavin Reilly	12	0	0	0	12
4	(Scotland)	Michael Paton	3	0	2	1	6
5	(Scotland)	Mark Durnan	5	0	0	0	5
=	(Scotland)	Robert McHugh	2	3	0	0	5
7	(Scotland)	Stephen McKenna	0	2	1	0	3
=	(Scotland)	Ryan McGuffie	2	0	1	0	3
=	(Scotland)	Chris Higgins	2	0	1	0	3
=	(Scotland)	Ian McShane	3	0	0	0	3
11	(Scotland)	Andy Dowie	2	0	0	0	2
=	(Scotland)	Kevin Holt	1	1	0	0	2
13	(Scotland)	Paul Burns	1	0	0	0	1

== Team statistics ==
=== League table ===
Pos	Team	Pld	W	D	L	GF	GA	GD	Pts	Promotion, qualification or relegation
2	Hamilton Academical (O, P)	36	19	10	7	68	41	+27	67	Qualification for the Premiership play-off semi-final
3	Falkirk	36	19	9	8	59	33	+26	66	Qualification for the Premiership play-off quarter-final
4	Queen of the South	36	16	7	13	53	39	+14	55	Qualification for the Premiership play-off quarter-final
5	Dumbarton	36	15	6	15	65	64	+1	51	
6	Livingston	36	13	7	16	51	56	−5	46	

Source: Soccerway
Rules for classification: 1) points; 2) goal difference; 3) number of goals scored.
(O) Play-off winners; (P) Promoted

=== Division summary ===
Round	1	2	3	4	5	6	7	8	9	10	11	12	13	14	15	16	17	18	19	20	21	22	23	24	25	26	27	28	29	30	31	32	33	34	35	36
Ground	H	A	A	H	H	A	H	A	H	A	A	H	H	A	A	H	A	A	H	H	A	A	H	H	A	H	H	A	H	A	H	H	A	A	H	A
Result	W	D	L	D	L	W	L	L	D	L	W	L	W	L	W	D	W	L	W	W	D	W	W	L	L	W	D	W	W	L	W	L	L	W	W	D
Position	2	3	6	6	9	5	7	7	7	9	8	8	7	8	7	8	7	8	8	6	6	4	4	4	5	4	4	4	4	4	4	4	4	4	4	4

Updated to match(es) played on 4 May 2014. Source:
A = Away; H = Home; W = Win; D = Draw; L = Loss

== Transfers ==
=== Players in ===
Player	From	Fee
(Scotland) Iain Russell	(Scotland) Livingston	Free
(Scotland) Andy Dowie	(Scotland) Partick Thistle	Free
(Wales) Calum Antell	(Scotland) Hibernian	Free
(United States) Kevin Dzierzawski	(United States) Dartmouth Big Green	Free
(Scotland) Zander Clark	(Scotland) St Johnstone	Loan
(Scotland) Robert McHugh	(Scotland) Motherwell	Loan
(Scotland) Mark Kerr	(Scotland) Partick Thistle	Free
(Scotland) Lewis Kidd	(Scotland) Celtic	Loan

=== Players out ===
Player	To	Fee
(Scotland) Nicky Clark	(Scotland) Rangers	Free
(England) Lee Robinson	(Sweden) Ostersunds FK	Free
(Scotland) Steven Black	(Scotland) Annan Athletic	Free
(Scotland) Marc Fitzpatrick	(Scotland) Greenock Morton	Free
(Scotland) Kevin Smith	(Scotland) Dumbarton	Free
(Wales) Calum Antell	(Scotland) Brechin City	Loan
(Scotland) Dan Orsi	(Scotland) Annan Athletic	Free
(Scotland) Ryan McGuffie	(Australia) St Albans Saints	Free
(Scotland) Liam Park	(Scotland) Dalbeattie Star	Loan

== See also ==
- List of Queen of the South F.C. seasons
