= Kevin Holt =

Scottish footballer

Personal information
- Date of birth: 25 January 1993 (age 33)
- Place of birth: Dumfries, Scotland
- Height: 1.89 m (6 ft 2 1/2 in)
- Positions: Left-back; centre back

Team information
- Current team: Ayr United
- Number: 5

Youth career
- 2010–2011: Queen of the South

Senior career*
Years	Team	Apps	(Gls)
2011–2015	Queen of the South	108	(5)
2015–2018	Dundee	95	(7)
2018–2019	Pafos	26	(0)
2019–2020	Queen of the South	27	(2)
2020–2021	Ermis Aradippou	27	(2)
2021–2023	Partick Thistle	59	(9)
2023–2025	Dundee United	54	(8)
2025	Derry City	20	(2)
2025–	Ayr United	44	(2)
- * Club domestic league appearances and goals as of 23:09, 7 November 2026 (UTC)

Kevin Holt (born 25 January 1993) is a Scottish professional footballer who plays as a left-back and also a centre-back for Scottish Championship club Ayr United. Holt started his career with local side Queen of the South before playing for Dundee and Cypriot side Pafos, then returning to The Doonhamers. After another stint in Cyprus with Ermis Aradippou, Holt spent two seasons with Partick Thistle before signing with Dundee United.

== Playing career ==
=== Queen of the South (First spell) ===
Holt joined Queen of the South in August 2010 and began playing for their Under-19 squad. In June 2011, Holt was awarded the Jade Moore Memorial Trophy for being Queens under-19s player of the season. Holt debuted for the first-team on 17 September 2011, appearing as a substitute in a 4–1 victory versus Greenock Morton in a Scottish First Division fixture replacing hat-trick scorer Kevin Smith.

Holt made his first senior start on 12 November 2011, versus Partick Thistle in a goalless home draw. Holt was sent off versus Dundee in December 2011 and this was his first ever dismissal. Holt's debut in the Scottish Cup was in a 1–0 away win versus the Maryhill Magyars on 7 January 2012 with the goal scored by Dan Carmichael. This was Queens first win in the competition since their 4–3 semi-final win versus Aberdeen in 2008 at Hampden Park. At the end of the 2011–12 season Queens were relegated to the Scottish Second Division but despite this Holt remained with the club, having signed a new contract in December 2011. He scored 6 goals in 137 competitive QoS first team games.

=== Dundee ===
In May 2015, Holt signed a pre-contract with Scottish Premiership club Dundee and the move was completed during the summer of 2015. After three seasons with Dundee, Holt was released at the end of the 2017-18 season. Holt scored 8 goals in 113 competitive first-team matches for the Dee.

=== Pafos ===
On 9 June 2018, after being released by Dundee, Holt signed for Cypriot club Pafos. Pafos ended their 22 matches in eighth position out of twelve clubs and entered the league's relegation section.

=== Queen of the South (Second spell) ===
On 27 May 2019, Holt signed for Queen of the South for a second spell on a two-year contract. The club announced Holt's departure from the club in September 2020.

=== Ermis Aradippou ===
On 11 September 2020, Holt returned to Cyprus to sign for Ermis Aradippou.

=== Partick Thistle ===
Holt signed a two-year deal with Scottish Championship club Partick Thistle in May 2021. Holt scored his first goal for Thistle, heading in from a corner, in a 3-0 away win against Dunfermline.

Holt finished the 2022–23 season having scored nine goals that season for Thistle, the highest return of his career in an individual season.

During his second season with Thistle, Holt was part of the squad that made it to the Scottish Premiership promotion play off final, which Thistle eventually lost on penalties to Ross County, meaning the club remained in the Scottish Championship. Following this Holt left the club.

=== Dundee United ===
In June 2023, Holt signed a one-year deal with Scottish Championship club Dundee United.

=== Derry City ===
On 22 February 2025, he signed for League of Ireland Premier Division club Derry City on a two-year-contract, for a fee understood to be £40,000 plus add-ons, with Dundee United stating that he had threatened to make himself unavailable for selection for the rest of his contract should they try to block the move from taking place.

=== Ayr United ===
Holt returned to Scotland in July 2025, signing a two year deal with Scottish Championship club Ayr United for an undisclosed fee.

== Personal life ==
Kevin Holt is the son of the Dumfries born footballer Gordon Holt. Gordon played for Kello Rovers in the Scottish Junior ranks before turning professional when he played for Airdrieonians during the 1986-87 season and then for Stranraer during the 1987-88 season.

In 2011, Holt was studying for a career in banking.

== Career statistics ==
As of match played on 4 July 2025

Appearances and goals by club, season and competition
Club	Season	League			National Cup (Note: Includes Scottish Cup, Cypriot Cup & FAI Cup)		League Cup (Note: Includes Scottish League Cup)		Other		Total	
Club	Season	Division	Apps	Goals	Apps	Goals	Apps	Goals	Apps	Goals	Apps	Goals
Queen of the South	2011–12	Scottish First Division	17	0	2	0	0	0	0 (Note: Appearances in the Scottish Challenge Cup)	0	19	0
Queen of the South	2012–13	Scottish Second Division	28	1	1	0	3	0	4	0	36	1
Queen of the South	2013–14	Scottish Championship	30	1	3	0	3	0	5 (Note: 3 appearances in the Scottish Challenge Cup; 2 appearances, 1 goal in the 2013–14 Scottish Premiership play-offs)	1	41	2
Queen of the South	2014–15	Scottish Championship	33	3	3	0	2	0	3 (Note: 1 appearance in the Scottish Challenge Cup; 2 appearances in the 2014–15 Scottish Premiership play-offs)	0	41	3
Queen of the South	Total		108	5	9	0	8	0	12	1	137	6
Dundee	2015–16	Scottish Premiership	34	2	4	1	1	0	—		39	3
Dundee	2016–17	Scottish Premiership	37	3	1	0	4	0	—		42	3
Dundee	2017–18	Scottish Premiership	24	2	2	0	6	0	—		32	2
Dundee	Total		95	7	7	1	11	0	—		113	8
Pafos	2018–19	Cypriot First Division	26	0	2	0	—		—		28	0
Queen of the South	2019–20	Scottish Championship	27	2	1	0	4	0	1	0	33	2
Ermis Aradippou	2020–21	Cypriot First Division	27	2	1	0	—		—		28	2
Partick Thistle	2021–22	Scottish Championship	34	4	3	0	4	0	4 (Note: 2 appearances, 1 goal in the Scottish Challenge Cup; 2 appearances in the 2021–22 Scottish Premiership Playoffs)	1	45	5
Partick Thistle	2022–23	Scottish Championship	25	5	2	1	6	1	6 (Note: Appearances in the 2022–23 Scottish Premiership Playoffs)	2	39	9
Partick Thistle	Total		59	9	5	1	10	1	10	3	84	14
Dundee United	2023–24	Scottish Championship	31	6	1	0	4	2	2	0	38	8
Dundee United	2024–25	Scottish Premiership	23	2	1	0	5	2	—		29	4
Dundee United	Total		54	8	2	0	9	4	2	0	67	12
Derry City	2025	LOI Premier Division	20	2	0	0	—		—		20	2
Career total			416	35	27	2	42	5	25	4	510	46

== Honours ==
Dundee United

- Scottish Championship: 2023–24

Queen of the South

- Scottish Second Division: 2012–13
- Scottish Challenge Cup: 2012–13
