= 2014–15 Queen of the South F.C. season =

Queen of the South
2014–15 season
- Chairman: Billy Hewitson
- Manager: Jim McIntyre; James Fowler
- Stadium: Palmerston Park
- Scottish Championship: 4th
- Challenge Cup: First round
- League Cup: Second round
- Scottish Cup: Sixth round
- Top goalscorer: League: Derek Lyle (15); All: Derek Lyle (21)
- Highest home attendance: 6,185 vs. Rangers, 12 December 2014
- Lowest home attendance: 1,597 vs. Raith Rovers, 22 November 2014
- Average home league attendance: 2,778

The 2014–15 season was Queen of the South's second consecutive season in the second tier of Scottish football and their second season in the Scottish Championship, having been promoted as champions from the Scottish Second Division at the end of the 2012–13 season. Queens also competed in the Challenge Cup, League Cup and the Scottish Cup.

== Summary ==
Queen of the South finished fourth in the Scottish Championship. Their league position qualified the club for the quarter-final stage of the Scottish Premiership play-offs where they were defeated 3-2 on aggregate by Rangers over two legs.

The club reached the first round of the Challenge Cup, the second round of the League Cup and the sixth round of the Scottish Cup.

=== Management ===
The club began the 2014-15 season under the management of Jim McIntyre. On 9 September 2014, McIntyre and first team coach Billy Dodds left to become the new manager and assistant of Scottish Premiership side Ross County. On 30 September 2014 James Fowler was announced as the club's new player-manager. On 30 March 2015 Fowler agreed a contract extension until 31 May 2016.

== Results & fixtures ==
Win Draw Loss Abandoned or Postponed

=== Preseason ===
2 July 2014 Friendly	Clyde	1 – 2	Queen of the South	Broadwood Stadium
19:30	Watt	QOSFC Report	Baird; Reilly	Attendance: Closed doors

5 July 2014 Friendly	Greenock Morton	0 – 1	Queen of the South	Broadwood Stadium
15:00		QOSFC Report	Paton 10'	Attendance: Closed doors

9 July 2014 Friendly	Annan Athletic	0 – 1	Queen of the South	Galabank
19:30		QOSFC Report	Swinglehurst 11' (o.g.)	Attendance: 300

12 July 2014 Friendly	Queen's Park	0 – 2	Queen of the South	Lesser Hampden
15:00		QOSFC Report	Lyle 45'; Hooper 70'	Attendance: Closed doors

16 July 2014 Friendly	Queen of the South	1 – 0	Gateshead	Palmerston Park
15:00	Baird 45'	QOSFC Report		Attendance: Closed doors

19 July 2014 Friendly	Queen of the South	5 – 1	Rotherham United	Palmerston Park
15:00	Baird 43', 62'; Lyle 68', 77'; Kidd 80'	QOSFC Report	Rowe 3'	Attendance: 689; Referee: Roache

22 July 2014 Friendly	Newcastle United	4 – 4	Queen of the South	Little Benton
12:00	Roberts; Ben Arfa; Bigirimana	QOSFC Report; Shields Gazette	Reilly; Dzierzawski; Russell	Attendance: Closed doors

=== Scottish Championship ===
9 August 2014 ScoChamp Match 1	Queen of the South	2 – 0	Alloa Athletic	Palmerston Park
15:00	Lyle 8'; Reilly 40'	QOSFC Report		Attendance: 1,635; Referee: Dallas

16 August 2014 ScoChamp Match 2	Dumbarton	0 – 4	Queen of the South	Bet Butler Stadium
15:00		QOSFC Report	Lyle 20'; Reilly 50'; Fowler 68'; Russell 77'	Attendance: 958; Referee: D Robertson

23 August 2014 ScoChamp Match 3	Queen of the South	1 – 1	Livingston	Palmerston Park
15:00	Jacobs 34' (o.g.); Fowler (yellow card) 63' (yellow-red card) 72'	QOSFC Report	White 66' (pen.)	Attendance: 1,805; Referee: Aitken

30 August 2014 ScoChamp Match 4	Rangers	4 – 2	Queen of the South	Ibrox Stadium
15:00	Zaliukas 27'; Templeton 46'; Mohsni 64'; Miller 86'	QOSFC Report	Reilly 22'; Russell 36'	Attendance: 31,851; Referee: McLean

13 September 2014 ScoChamp Match 5	Falkirk	1 – 1	Queen of the South	Falkirk Stadium
15:00	Durnan 83' (o.g.)	QOSFC Report	Reilly 70'	Attendance: 3,793; Referee: Thomson

20 September 2014 ScoChamp Match 6	Queen of the South	1 – 0	Hibernian	Palmerston Park
15:00	McShane 29'	QOSFC Report		Attendance: 3,083; Referee: Muir

27 September 2014 ScoChamp Match 7	Cowdenbeath	2 – 1	Queen of the South	Central Park
15:00	Oyenuga 28'; Gallagher 41'	QOSFC Report	Lyle 62'	Attendance: 674; Referee: Anderson

4 October 2014 ScoChamp Match 8	Queen of the South	0 – 3	Heart of Midlothian	Palmerston Park
15:00		QOSFC Report	Sow 39'; Buaben 42'; McGhee 59'	Attendance: 5,534; Referee: Colvin

10 October 2014 ScoChamp Match 9	Raith Rovers	3 – 4	Queen of the South	Stark's Park
19:35	Stewart 59', 78'; Nade 62'	QOSFC Report	Baird 7'; Reilly 50'; Holt (red card) 73'; Lyle 74'; Russell 90'	Attendance: 1,552; Referee: Muir

18 October 2014 ScoChamp Match 10	Queen of the South	3 – 0	Falkirk	Palmerston Park
15:00	Dowie 38'; Reilly 42'; Kerr 72'	QOSFC Report		Attendance: 2,038; Referee: Beaton

25 October 2014 ScoChamp Match 11	Livingston	2 – 2	Queen of the South	Energy Assets Arena
15:00	Mullen 81'; Glen 88'	QOSFC Report	Russell 31'; Reilly 69'	Attendance: 1,099; Referee: Graham

8 November 2014 ScoChamp Match 12	Queen of the South	3 – 0	Dumbarton	Palmerston Park
15:00	Baird 32' (pen.); Durnan 69'; Lyle 71'	QOSFC Report		Attendance: 1,677; Referee: Thomson

15 November 2014 ScoChamp Match 13	Hibernian	0 – 0	Queen of the South	Easter Road
15:00		QOSFC Report		Attendance: 10,069; Referee: Salmond

22 November 2014 ScoChamp Match 14	Queen of the South	2 – 0	Raith Rovers	Palmerston Park
17:30	Baird 22'; Reilly 80'	QOSFC Report		Attendance: 1,597; Referee: Finnie

6 December 2014 ScoChamp Match 15	Heart of Midlothian	4 – 1	Queen of the South	Tynecastle Stadium
15:00	Keatings 19'; Wilson 67'; Buaben 74'; Eckersley 79'	QOSFC Report	Russell 56' (pen.)	Attendance: 15,459; Referee: Charleston

12 December 2014 ScoChamp Match 16	Queen of the South	2 – 0	Rangers	Palmerston Park
19:45	Holt 22'; Reilly 67'	QOSFC Report		Attendance: 6,185; Referee: Dallas

20 December 2014 ScoChamp Match 17	Queen of the South	1 – 2	Cowdenbeath	Palmerston Park
15:00	Lyle 86'	QOSFC Report	Gallagher 41'; Higgins 90'	Attendance: 1,717; Referee: Anderson

27 December 2014 ScoChamp Match 18	Alloa Athletic	1 – 1	Queen of the South	Indodrill Stadium
15:00	Cawley 75'	QOSFC Report	Lyle 41'	Attendance: 921; Referee: Finnie

3 January 2015 ScoChamp Match 19	Queen of the South	3 – 1	Livingston	Palmerston Park
15:00	Dowie 31'; Lyle 65'; Russell 76'	QOSFC Report	White 39'	Attendance: 1,940; Referee: Aitken

10 January 2015 ScoChamp	Raith Rovers	P – P	Queen of the South	Stark's Park
15:00		BBC Sport News
Note: Postponed due to waterlogged pitch

17 January 2015 ScoChamp Match 20	Falkirk	1 – 1	Queen of the South	Falkirk Stadium
15:00	Loy 16' (pen.)	QOSFC Report	Reilly 56'; Durnan (red card) 64'	Attendance: 3,478; Referee: Allan

24 January 2015 ScoChamp Match 21	Queen of the South	0 – 2	Hibernian	Palmerston Park
15:00		QOSFC Report	McGeouch 63' (pen.); Robertson 75'	Attendance: 3,677; Referee: Murray

31 January 2015 ScoChamp Match 22	Cowdenbeath	0 – 5	Queen of the South	Central Park
15:00		QOSFC Report	Lyle 45', 58', 81' (pen.); Reilly 56'; McShane 61'	Attendance: 569; Referee: Cook

14 February 2015 ScoChamp Match 23	Queen of the South	1 – 0	Alloa Athletic	Palmerston Park
15:00	Holt 76'	QOSFC Report	Benedictus (yellow card) 54' (yellow-red card) 90'	Attendance: 1,673; Referee: Charleston

21 February 2015 ScoChamp Match 24	Queen of the South	1 – 2	Heart of Midlothian	Palmerston Park
15:00	Carmichael 24'	QOSFC Report	King 32'; Zeefuik 85'	Attendance: 5,100; Referee: Anderson

28 February 2015 ScoChamp Match 25	Dumbarton	0 – 0	Queen of the South	Bet Butler Stadium
15:00		QOSFC Report	Lyle (red card) 90'	Attendance: 904; Referee: McLean

10 March 2015 ScoChamp Match 26	Rangers	1 – 1	Queen of the South	Ibrox Stadium
19:45	Vuckic 77'	QOSFC Report	A. Smith 86'	Attendance: 35,018; Referee: McKendrick

14 March 2015 ScoChamp Match 27	Queen of the South	2 – 1	Raith Rovers	Palmerston Park
15:00	Russell 9'; Reilly 39'	QOSFC Report	Vaughan 20'	Attendance: 1,656; Referee: Graham

21 March 2015 ScoChamp Match 28	Queen of the South	4 – 1	Cowdenbeath	Palmerston Park
15:00	Russell 27'; Paton 51'; Durnan 75'; Lyle 89'	QOSFC Report	Higgins 60'	Attendance: 1,671; Referee: Aitken

24 March 2015 ScoChamp Match 29	Raith Rovers	3 – 0	Queen of the South	Stark's Park
19:45	Stewart 23', 78'; Vaughan 82'	QOSFC Report		Attendance: 1,152; Referee: Charleston

28 March 2015 ScoChamp Match 30	Heart of Midlothian	2 – 0	Queen of the South	Tynecastle Stadium
15:00	Sow 6'; Ozturk 67'	QOSFC Report		Attendance: 16,855; Referee: Thomson

4 April 2015 ScoChamp Match 31	Hibernian	0 – 1	Queen of the South	Easter Road
15:00		QOSFC Report	Durnan 47'	Attendance: 8,773; Referee: Murray

9 April 2015 ScoChamp Match 32	Queen of the South	3 – 0	Rangers	Palmerston Park
19:45	Lyle 33'; Kidd 46'; Reilly 69'	QOSFC Report		Attendance: 5,093; Referee: D Robertson

12 April 2015 ScoChamp Match 33	Queen of the South	1 – 0	Falkirk	Palmerston Park
15:00	Lyle 22'	QOSFC Report		Attendance: 2,057; Referee: Muir

18 April 2015 ScoChamp Match 34	Alloa Athletic	2 – 2	Queen of the South	Indodrill Stadium
15:00	Gordon 40'; Buchanan 66'	QOSFC Report	Lyle 51' (pen.); Millar 53' (red card) 88'	Attendance: 822; Referee: Finnie

25 April 2015 ScoChamp Match 35	Queen of the South	2 – 1	Dumbarton	Palmerston Park
15:00	Holt 55'; McKenna 72'	QOSFC Report	McCallum 80'	Attendance: 1,865; Referee: Colvin

2 May 2015 ScoChamp Match 36	Livingston	1 – 0	Queen of the South	Energy Assets Arena
12:15	Jacobs 78' (pen.)	QOSFC Report		Attendance: 2,475; Referee: Collum

=== Premiership play-offs ===
9 May 2015 Quarter Final 1st Leg	Queen of the South	1 – 2	Rangers	Palmerston Park
17:30	Lyle 64'	QOSFC Report	Smith 44'; Shiels 75'	Attendance: 5,224; Referee: Muir

17 May 2015 Quarter Final 2nd Leg	Rangers	1 – 1 (3 – 2 agg.)	Queen of the South	Ibrox Stadium
15:30	Wallace 60'	QOSFC Report	Lyle 35'	Attendance: 48,035; Referee: Clancy

=== Scottish Challenge Cup ===
26 July 2014 Round 1	Queen of the South	3 – 4 (a.e.t.)	Livingston	Palmerston Park
15:00	Dowie 24'; Russell 56'; Paton 107'	QOSFC Report	Sives 58'; Mullen 65'; Hippolyte 98'; Robertson 115'	Attendance: 1,196; Referee: Charleston

=== Scottish League Cup ===
2 August 2014 Round 1	Queen of the South	5 – 0	Elgin City	Palmerston Park
15:00	Russell 6', 61', 86'; Lyle 35', 90'	QOSFC Report		Attendance: 939; Referee: Allan

26 August 2014 Round 2	Livingston	1 – 0 (a.e.t.)	Queen of the South	Energy Assets Arena
19:45	Hippolyte 119'	QOSFC Report		Attendance: 620; Referee: Salmond

=== Scottish Cup ===
29 November 2014 Round 4	Queen of the South	4 – 1	Brora Rangers	Palmerston Park
15:00	Lyle 3'; Reilly 61'; Russell 71'; Kidd 80'	QOSFC Report	Greig 65'	Attendance: 1,434; Referee: Muir

7 February 2015 Round 5	Queen of the South	2 – 0	St Johnstone	Palmerston Park
15:00	Lyle 48'; Reilly 90'	QOSFC Report		Attendance: 3,043; Referee: McLean

6 March 2015 Round 6	Queen of the South	0 – 1	Falkirk	Palmerston Park
19:35		QOSFC Report	Sibbald 34'	Attendance: 2,833; Referee: Clancy

== Player statistics ==
=== Captains ===
No.	P	Name	Country	No. games	Notes
6	DF	Chris Higgins	(Scotland)	41	Club Captain
5	DF	Mark Durnan	(Scotland)	2	Vice Captain
4	DF	Andy Dowie	(Scotland)	1	Vice Captain

Last updated: 26 May 2015
Source: Competitive match reports.
Competitive matches only
Matches started as captain only
Country: FIFA nationality; No.: Squad number; P: Position; Name: Player name; No. Games: Number of games started as captain.

=== Squad ===
Last updated 26 May 2015

No.	Pos	Nat	Player	Total		Scottish Championship		Other^{[a]}		League Cup		Scottish Cup	
No.	Pos	Nat	Player	Apps	Goals	Apps	Goals	Apps	Goals	Apps	Goals	Apps	Goals
1	GK	(Scotland) SCO	Zander Clark	39	0	33+0	0	3+0	0	2+0	0	1+0	0
2	DF	(Scotland) SCO	Chris Mitchell	2	0	0+1	0	0+0	0	0+0	0	0+1	0
3	DF	(Scotland) SCO	Kevin Holt	41	3	33+0	3	3+0	0	2+0	0	3+0	0
4	DF	(Scotland) SCO	Andy Dowie	42	3	34+0	2	3+0	1	2+0	0	3+0	0
5	DF	(Scotland) SCO	Mark Durnan	38	3	29+1	3	3+0	0	2+0	0	3+0	0
6	DF	(Scotland) SCO	Chris Higgins	41	0	34+0	0	2+0	0	2+0	0	3+0	0
7	MF	(Scotland) SCO	Paul Burns	7	0	2+3	0	0+0	0	0+0	0	2+0	0
*8	MF	(Scotland) SCO	Mark Kerr	13	1	10+2	1	0+0	0	0+0	0	1+0	0
8	MF	(Scotland) SCO	Mark Millar	15	1	10+3	1	1+1	0	0+0	0	0+0	0
*9	FW	(Scotland) SCO	John Baird	20	3	8+10	3	0+0	0	1+0	0	0+1	0
10	FW	(Scotland) SCO	Gavin Reilly	39	15	30+2	13	3+0	0	1+0	0	3+0	2
11	FW	(Scotland) SCO	Iain Russell	40	13	24+8	8	1+2	1	2+0	3	2+1	1
12	DF	(Scotland) SCO	Lewis Kidd	43	2	23+12	1	3+0	0	1+1	0	2+1	1
14	MF	(Scotland) SCO	Stephen McKenna	16	1	7+6	1	1+1	0	0+0	0	0+1	0
15	FW	(Scotland) SCO	Michael Paton	24	2	13+7	1	1+1	1	0+0	0	2+0	0
16	MF	(United States) USA	Kevin Dzierzawski	19	0	2+14	0	0+1	0	1+1	0	0+0	0
17	MF	(Scotland) SCO	Daniel Carmichael	41	1	30+3	1	3+0	0	1+1	0	1+2	0
18	MF	(Scotland) SCO	Ian McShane	41	2	32+1	2	3+0	0	2+0	0	3+0	0
19	FW	(Scotland) SCO	Derek Lyle	41	21	26+8	15	2+1	2	1+1	2	2+0	2
20	GK	(England) ENG	James Atkinson	6	0	3+1	0	0+0	0	0+0	0	2+0	0
21	MF	(Scotland) SCO	Patrick Slattery	0	0	0+0	0	0+0	0	0+0	0	0+0	0
22	DF	(Scotland) SCO	Scott Hooper	7	0	2+5	0	0+0	0	0+0	0	0+0	0
23	MF	(Scotland) SCO	Dean Smith	6	0	0+3	0	0+1	0	0+2	0	0+0	0
24	FW	(Scotland) SCO	Aidan Smith	7	1	1+4	1	0+1	0	0+0	0	0+1	0
25	FW	(Algeria) ALG	Salim Kouider Aissa	0	0	0+0	0	0+0	0	0+0	0	0+0	0
26	DF	(Scotland) SCO	James Fowler	11	1	7+1	1	1+0	0	2+0	0	0+0	0
27	FW	(Scotland) SCO	Greg Kiltie	3	0	3+0	0	0+0	0	0+0	0	0+0	0
28	FW	(England) ENG	Jake Pickard	12	0	0+11	0	0+0	0	0+0	0	0+1	0
29	DF	(England) ENG	Jack Dickinson	0	0	0+0	0	0+0	0	0+0	0	0+0	0
31	GK	(Scotland) SCO	Kenny Arthur	0	0	0+0	0	0+0	0	0+0	0	0+0	0

a. Includes other competitive competitions, including the play-offs and the Challenge Cup.

=== Disciplinary record ===
Includes all competitive matches.

Last updated 26 May 2015

Nation	Position	Name	Scottish Championship		Other		League Cup		Scottish Cup		Total	
Nation	Position	Name	Yellow card	Red card	Yellow card	Red card	Yellow card	Red card	Yellow card	Red card	Yellow card	Red card
(Scotland)	GK	Zander Clark	2	0	0	0	0	0	0	0	2	0
(England)	GK	James Atkinson	1	0	0	0	0	0	0	0	1	0
(Scotland)	GK	Kenny Arthur	0	0	0	0	0	0	0	0	0	0
(Scotland)	DF	Scott Hooper	1	0	0	0	0	0	0	0	1	0
(Scotland)	DF	Mark Durnan	8	1	0	0	0	0	0	0	8	1
(Scotland)	DF	Chris Higgins	8	0	0	0	0	0	1	0	9	0
(Scotland)	DF	Chris Mitchell	0	0	0	0	0	0	0	0	0	0
(Scotland)	DF	Andy Dowie	5	1	0	0	0	0	0	0	5	1
(Scotland)	DF	Kevin Holt	5	1	0	0	0	0	0	0	5	1
(Scotland)	DF	Lewis Kidd	3	0	0	0	0	0	1	0	4	0
(Scotland)	DF	James Fowler	4	1	1	0	0	0	0	0	5	1
(England)	DF	Jack Dickinson	0	0	0	0	0	0	0	0	0	0
(United States)	MF	Kevin Dzierzawski	0	0	0	0	0	0	0	0	0	0
(Scotland)	MF	Paul Burns	0	0	0	0	0	0	0	0	0	0
(Scotland)	MF	Mark Kerr	1	0	0	0	0	0	0	0	1	0
(Scotland)	MF	Mark Millar	2	1	1	0	0	0	0	0	3	1
(Scotland)	MF	Daniel Carmichael	1	0	0	0	0	0	0	0	1	0
(Scotland)	MF	Ian McShane	5	0	0	0	0	0	0	0	5	0
(Scotland)	MF	Stephen McKenna	1	0	1	0	0	0	0	0	2	0
(Scotland)	MF	Patrick Slattery	0	0	0	0	0	0	0	0	0	0
(Scotland)	MF	Dean Smith	1	0	0	0	0	0	0	0	1	0
(Algeria)	FW	Salim Kouider Aissa	0	0	0	0	0	0	0	0	0	0
(Scotland)	FW	John Baird	1	0	0	0	0	0	0	0	1	0
(Scotland)	FW	Iain Russell	6	0	2	0	1	0	0	0	9	0
(Scotland)	FW	Derek Lyle	3	1	0	0	0	0	1	0	4	1
(Scotland)	FW	Gavin Reilly	0	0	0	0	0	0	1	0	1	0
(Scotland)	FW	Michael Paton	3	0	0	0	0	0	0	0	3	0
(Scotland)	FW	Aidan Smith	0	0	0	0	0	0	0	0	0	0
(Scotland)	FW	Greg Kiltie	0	0	0	0	0	0	0	0	0	0
(England)	FW	Jake Pickard	0	0	0	0	0	0	0	0	0	0

=== Clean sheets ===
No.	Pos	Nat	Name	Scottish Championship	Other	League Cup	Scottish Cup	Total
1	GK	(Scotland)	Zander Clark	14	0	1	0	15
20	GK	(England)	James Atkinson	0	0	0	1	1
31	GK	(Scotland)	Kenny Arthur	0	0	0	0	0
			Totals	14	0	1	1	16

Last updated: 26 May 2015
Source: Match reports in Competitive matches

=== Top Scorers ===
Last updated on 26 May 2015

Position	Nation	Name	Scottish Championship	Other	League Cup	Scottish Cup	Total
1	(Scotland)	Derek Lyle	15	2	2	2	21
2	(Scotland)	Gavin Reilly	13	0	0	2	15
3	(Scotland)	Iain Russell	8	1	3	1	13
4	(Scotland)	John Baird	3	0	0	0	3
=	(Scotland)	Andy Dowie	2	1	0	0	3
=	(Scotland)	Mark Durnan	3	0	0	0	3
=	(Scotland)	Kevin Holt	3	0	0	0	3
8	(Scotland)	Michael Paton	1	1	0	0	2
=	(Scotland)	Ian McShane	2	0	0	0	2
=	(Scotland)	Lewis Kidd	1	0	0	1	2
11	(Scotland)	Mark Kerr	1	0	0	0	1
=	(Scotland)	James Fowler	1	0	0	0	1
=	(Scotland)	Daniel Carmichael	1	0	0	0	1
=	(Scotland)	Aidan Smith	1	0	0	0	1
=	(Scotland)	Mark Millar	1	0	0	0	1
=	(Scotland)	Stephen McKenna	1	0	0	0	1

== Team statistics ==
=== League table ===
Pos	Team	Pld	W	D	L	GF	GA	GD	Pts	Promotion, qualification or relegation
2	Hibernian	36	21	7	8	70	32	+38	70	Qualification for the Premiership play-off semi-final
3	Rangers	36	19	10	7	69	39	+30	67	Qualification for the Premiership play-off quarter-final
4	Queen of the South	36	17	9	10	58	41	+17	60	Qualification for the Premiership play-off quarter-final
5	Falkirk	36	14	11	11	48	48	0	53	
6	Raith Rovers	36	12	7	17	42	65	−23	43	

Source: Soccerway
Rules for classification: 1) Points; 2) Goal difference; 3) Number of goals scored

=== Division summary ===
Round	1	2	3	4	5	6	7	8	9	10	11	12	13	14	15	16	17	18	19	20	21	22	23	24	25	26	27	28	29	30	31	32	33	34	35	36
Ground	H	A	H	A	A	H	A	H	A	H	A	H	A	H	A	H	H	A	H	A	H	A	H	H	A	A	H	H	A	A	A	H	H	A	H	A
Result	W	W	D	L	D	W	L	L	W	W	D	W	D	W	L	W	L	D	W	D	L	W	W	L	D	D	W	W	L	L	W	W	W	D	W	L
Position	2	1	2	4	4	4	4	4	3	3	3	3	3	3	3	3	4	4	4	4	5	4	4	4	4	4	4	4	4	4	5	4	4	4	4	4

Updated to match(es) played on 3 May 2015. Source:
A = Away; H = Home; W = Win; D = Draw; L = Loss

== Transfers ==
=== Players in ===
Player	From	Fee
(Scotland) John Baird	(Scotland) Raith Rovers	Free
(Scotland) Lewis Kidd	(Scotland) Celtic	Free
(Scotland) James Fowler	(Scotland) Kilmarnock	Free
(Scotland) Zander Clark	(Scotland) St Johnstone	Loan
(Algeria) Salim Kouider-Aissa	(Scotland) Stenhousemuir	Free
(Scotland) Greg Kiltie	(Scotland) Kilmarnock	Loan
(Scotland) Kenny Arthur	(Scotland) Annan Athletic	Free
(Scotland) Mark Millar	(Scotland) Peterhead	Free

=== Players out ===
Player	To	Fee
(Wales) Calum Antell	(Scotland) Nairn County	Free
(Scotland) Derek Young	(Scotland) Forfar Athletic	Free
(Algeria) Salim Kouider-Aissa	(Scotland) Shotts Bon Accord	Loan
(Scotland) Patrick Slattery	(Scotland) Queen's Park	Loan
(Scotland) Mark Kerr	(Scotland) Falkirk	Free
(Scotland) John Baird	(Scotland) Falkirk	Free
(United States) Kevin Dzierzawski	(Scotland) Peterhead	Loan

== See also ==
- List of Queen of the South F.C. seasons
