= Lee Robinson (footballer) =

English footballer

Personal information
- Full name: Lee David Robinson
- Date of birth: 2 July 1986 (age 40)
- Place of birth: Sunderland, England
- Height: 1.80 m (5 ft 11 in)
- Position: Goalkeeper

Senior career*
Years	Team	Apps	(Gls)
2004–2009	Rangers	1	(0)
2007–2008	→ Greenock Morton (loan)	20	(0)
2008	→ St Johnstone (loan)	0	(0)
2009	→ Queen of the South (loan)	17	(0)
2009–2010	Kilmarnock	1	(0)
2010–2013	Queen of the South	72	(0)
2013	Östersund	0	(0)
2014	Raith Rovers	14	(0)
2014–2015	Rangers	7	(0)
2016–2017	Queen of the South	35	(0)
2018–2019	Dunfermline Athletic	39	(0)
Total		206	(0)
- * Club domestic league appearances and goals

Lee David Robinson (born 2 July 1986 in Sunderland) is an English former professional goalkeeper. Robinson played for Rangers, Greenock Morton, St Johnstone, Queen of the South, Kilmarnock, Östersund, Raith Rovers and Dunfermline Athletic.

== Career ==
=== Rangers (first spell) ===
Born in Sunderland, England, Robinson began his football career at Sunderland and spent five years with the academy before being let go at age thirteen, as he was "too small". Robinson then joined Esh Winning, where he progressed with the team. Robinson then signed a professional contract with Esh Winning that kept him until the end of the 2003–04 season. Having gone on a trial with "a couple of league clubs", it was announced on 17 October 2003 that he would be joining Rangers. By the time he was signing for the club, Robinson attended Peterlee's East Durham and Houghall Community College, studying Leisure and Recreation course.

Robinson first appeared for Rangers as an unused substitute, in a 2–0 win against Partick Thistle on 19 April 2004. He made his first-team debut for the club on 7 May 2006, coming on as a substitute for Ronald Waterreus for the final twelve minutes of Rangers 2–0 win over Hearts. On 12 December 2006, Robinson signed a new contract, to keep him at Rangers until the summer of 2009

==== Loan spells from Rangers ====
On 6 July 2007, it was announced that Robinson would spend the duration of the 2007–08 season on loan at Greenock Morton. He was previously advised by Rangers' first-choice goalkeeper Allan McGregor to go out on loan to "get first team football". Robinson made his debut for the club, starting the whole game, in a 3–2 win over Clyde in the opening game of the 2007–08 season. However, he soon broke his finger that saw him sidelined for two months and did not play again for the rest of the year. But Robinson made his return to the starting line-up for Greenock Morton, in a 2–1 win against Stirling Albion on 2 January 2008. At the end of the 2007–08 season, he went on to make twenty appearances in all competitions.

In October 2008, Robinson moved to Scottish First Division side St Johnstone on a month-long loan deal as back-up to Alan Main. Robinson returned to Rangers on 31 December 2008.

Robinson later signed a loan deal to play for First Division club Queen of the South until the end of season 2008–09. He made his debut for the club, starting the whole game, in a 2–2 draw against Greenock Morton on 3 January 2009. Robinson became a first-choice goalkeeper for the Queen of the South and played eighteen matches for the Dumfries club. At the end of the season, he returned to Rangers. Robinson departed Rangers in the summer of 2009.

=== Kilmarnock ===
Robinson then signed for Kilmarnock on a free transfer. He made one first team appearance in his season at Rugby Park, coming on as an early substitute for the injured Cammy Bell against Hibernian on 6 March 2010. Robinson claimed man of the match for his performance after frustrating the opposition with a number of saves including a penalty save which would become a trademark of his game in the upcoming years.

=== Queen of the South (first spell) ===
Roddy McKenzie sustained a serious injury in the pre-season testimonial game for Jim Thomson against Rangers at Palmerston Park. The severity of the injury merited Queens signing Robinson to provide additional goalkeeping resource to the squad due to McKenzie's absence. Robinson re-joined Queens on a short-term deal, and this was extended for half of that particular season.

Robinson played 45 minutes in a pre-season friendly against Hamilton. Robinson then started in the League Cup win against Albion Rovers on 24 July 2010. Robinson, in the Challenge Cup second round penalty shoot-out win away at Dunfermline Athletic on 10 August 2010 was described by one reporter as, "excellent all night, he commands his box well and when called upon made a couple of fine saves one of which was superb and of course he made two crucial penalty saves too. So for that he'd be my man of the match."

Robinson continued to be selected for Queens cup ties with David Hutton being favoured for league matches. This led to Robinson playing in the Challenge Cup semi final 2–1 win away to Peterhead on 9 October 2010. The club announced on 13 January 2011 that Robinson had left the club yet again. His last appearance was in the 2–1 Scottish Cup match versus Brechin City on the previous Tuesday night.

Queen of the South signed Robinson once again on 28 July 2011 for the new season after he had been training with the club for a short time. Robinson's first game of this spell was early in the season on 20 August 2011, in a 2–0 defeat to Ross County. Since joining Queen of the South, Robinson, once again, established himself as the first-choice goalkeeper at Queens. This led to McKenzie leaving the club by mutual consent on 10 January 2012. At the end of the 2011–12 season, he made thirty–nine appearances in all competitions.

The start of the 2012–13 season saw Robinson keeping four consecutive clean sheets in the first four league matches. He was successful in a second penalty shoot-out for Queens when eliminating Rangers from the Challenge Cup at Ibrox. This was followed up by keeping another three consecutive clean sheets between 22 September 2012 and 6 October 2012. Robinson then made his 100th appearance for the club in a derby match against Stranraer on 16 February 2013. Robinson was instrumental in the 6–5 penalty shoot-out when Queens of the South won the Challenge Cup versus Partick Thistle on 7 April 2013 and with the club also winning the Second Division, thus gained the club their inaugural league and cup double. Robinson was described as a "hero" by Dumfries and Galloway Standard newspaper. At the end of the 2012–13 season, he was named in the PFA Scotland Team of the Year for the Second Division alongside teammates Chris Mitchell, Mark Durnan, Chris Higgins, Daniel Carmichael and Nicky Clark. Robinson was also awarded SFL Goalkeeper of the Season. Having made forty-six appearances in all competitions, he left Queens of the South after turning down a new contract offered by the club.

=== Östersunds FK ===
Robinson signed for Swedish club Östersund managed by Graham Potter. Östersunds were in Sweden's second tier at the time after promotion in each of the two seasons before under the Potter regime. They finished the season with Robinson in tenth position in the league.

He made his debut for the club, starting the whole game, in a 2–2 draw against Falkenberg on 27 July 2013. However, Robinson made three appearances for Östersunds and left the club at the end of the 2013 season.

=== Raith Rovers ===
On 7 February 2014, Robinson signed until the end of the season for Scottish club Raith Rovers.

He made his debut for the club, starting the whole game, in a 4–2 defeat to Hamilton on 15 February 2014. Having won the 2012–13 Scottish Challenge Cup final with Queen of the South, Robinson was instrumental in repeating this success against Rangers putting in a man of the match performance in a 1–0 victory.

=== Rangers (second spell) ===
Robinson signed for Rangers in August 2014, as manager Ally McCoist sought cover for the injured Cammy Bell.

He spent four months as the club's second-choice goalkeeper behind Steve Simonsen. Robinson made his first appearance for Rangers in eight years, coming on as a 54th-minute substitute, in a 1–0 win against St Johnstone in the quarter–finals of the Scottish League Cup. In a follow-up match against Dumbarton, he started the whole game and kept a clean sheet, in a 1–0 win. After claiming the number one position following Simonsen's suspension, he played seven games under the caretaker management of Kenny McDowall. However, poor performance led Robinson being dropped from the first-choice goalkeeper status by interim manager Stuart McCall in favour of the returning Bell, as the club were unsuccessful in gaining promotion back to the Scottish Premiership. At the end of the 2014–15 season, he made nine appearances in all competitions. Shortly after, Robinson was released by Rangers for the second time.

=== Queen of the South (second spell) ===
After one season away from playing football to coach goalkeepers in the United States, Robinson returned to Scotland to sign a two-year contract with Queen of the South on 17 June 2016. He was also appointed the Dumfries club's goalkeeping coach after the departure of Kenny Arthur to Partick Thistle.

Robinson made his third debut for Queen of the South, starting the whole game and kept a clean sheet, in a 2–0 win against Queen's Park in the Scottish League Cup. Since re–joining the club, he regained his first-choice goalkeeper role throughout the 2016–17 season and made forty–six appearances in all competitions.

On 9 September 2017, Robinson departed Queens by mutual consent, after not featuring since the start of the 2017–18 season. Robinson, having played for the Doonhamers more than any other club in his career thus far, after three spells in Dumfries, once on loan and two as a signed player, was the Queens goalkeeper in 124 league matches and 35 cup matches. This gives Robinson 159 appearances in all competitions.

=== Dunfermline Athletic ===
On 2 January 2018, Robinson signed a short-term deal with Scottish Championship club Dunfermline Athletic, making his debut on the same day in a local derby match against Falkirk. Robinson was named man-of-the-match after an assured debut. This was followed up by keeping a clean sheet in the next two league matches against Dumbarton and Dundee United. He, once again, kept three consecutive clean sheets between 13 March 2018 and 20 March 2018. However, Robinson was unable to help the club overcome the deficit after losing 2–1 in the Premiership play–offs on aggregate against Dundee United. At the end of the 2017–18 season, he made twenty–one appearances in all competitions. On 17 May 2018, Robinson signed a new one-year deal with Dunfermline Athletic.

During the 2018–19 season, Robinson played regularly for the Pars, until Johnston's departure following Alloa Athletic's 2–2 comeback draw on 5 January 2019. He played in the following two matches, with his final appearance of the season being the 3–0 defeat at Raith Rovers in the Scottish Cup on 19 January 2019. Following this, he was dropped in favour of Ryan Scully for the rest of the 2018–19 season and finished the season, making twenty–eight appearances in all competitions. Robinson was then released by Dunfermline Athletic at the end of that season.

== Career statistics ==
As of 9 February 2019

Appearances and goals by club, season and competition
Club	Season	League			FA Cup		League Cup		Other		Total	
Club	Season	Division	Apps	Goals	Apps	Goals	Apps	Goals	Apps	Goals	Apps	Goals
Rangers	2005–06	Scottish Premier League	1	0	0	0	0	0	0	0	1	0
Greenock Morton (loan)	2007–08	Scottish First Division	20	0	0	0	1	0	2 (Note: Appearances in the Scottish Challenge Cup)	0	23	0
St Johnstone (loan)	2008–09	Scottish First Division	0	0	0	0	0	0	0	0	0	0
Queen of the South (loan)	2008–09	Scottish First Division	17	0	1	0	0	0	0	0	18	0
Kilmarnock	2009–10	Scottish Premier League	1	0	0	0	0	0	0	0	1	0
Queen of the South	2010–11	Scottish First Division	2	0	1	0	2	0	0	0	5	0
Queen of the South	2011–12	Scottish First Division	34	0	3	0	2	0	0	0	39	0
Queen of the South	2012–13	Scottish Second Division	36	0	1	0	3	0	3	0	43	0
Queen of the South	Total		72	0	5	0	7	0	3	0	87	0
Östersund	2013	Superettan	0	0	0	0	0	0	0	0	0	0
Raith Rovers	2013–14	Scottish Championship	14	0	1	0	0	0	0	0	15	0
Rangers	2014–15	Scottish Championship	7	0	1	0	1	0	0	0	9	0
Queen of the South	2016–17	Scottish Championship	35	0	1	0	6	0	4	0	46	0
Dunfermline Athletic	2017–18	Scottish Championship	18	0	1	0	0	0	2 (Note: Appearances in the Scottish Premiership play-offs)	0	21	0
Dunfermline Athletic	2018–19	Scottish Championship	21	0	1	0	4	0	2	0	28	0
Dunfermline Athletic	Total		39	0	2	0	4	0	4	0	49	0
Career Total			206	0	11	0	19	0	13	0	249	0

== Honours ==
=== Club ===
Queen of the South

- Scottish Challenge Cup: 2012–13
- Scottish Second Division: 2012–13

Raith Rovers

- Scottish Challenge Cup: 2013–14

=== Individual ===
- SFL Goalkeeper of the Season Award: 2012–13
- PFA Scotland Team of the Year: 2012–13
