= 2012–13 Queen of the South F.C. season =

Queen of the South
2012–13 season
- Chairman: Billy Hewitson
- Manager: Allan Johnston
- Stadium: Palmerston Park
- Second Division: 1st (champions)
- Challenge Cup: Winners
- League Cup: Third round
- Scottish Cup: Fourth round
- Top goalscorer: League: Nicky Clark (32); All: Nicky Clark (41)
- Highest home attendance: 2,568 vs. East Fife, 27 April 2013
- Lowest home attendance: 1,247 vs. Forfar Athletic, 11 August 2012
- Average home league attendance: 1,670

The 2012–13 season was Queen of the South's first season back in the Scottish Second Division after an absence of a decade after the club's relegation from the Scottish First Division at the end of the 2011–12 season. Queens also competed in the Challenge Cup, League Cup and the Scottish Cup.

== Summary ==
Queen of the South finished first in the Second Division to be crowned champions and were promoted to the Scottish Championship. The club were also the winners of the Challenge Cup to complete a historic double for the club and also reached the third round of the League Cup and the fourth round of the Scottish Cup.

== Results & fixtures ==
Win Draw Loss Abandoned or Postponed

=== Preseason ===
7 July 2012 Friendly	Clyde	1–3	Queen of the South	East Kilbride
		QOSFC Report	Carmichael; Lyle; McKay	Attendance: Closed doors

11 July 2012 Friendly	Partick Thistle	1–4	Queen of the South	Firhill Stadium
		QOSMAD Report	Smith; McShane; Durnan	Attendance: Closed doors

14 July 2012 Friendly	Gretna 2008	0–4	Queen of the South	Raydale Park
		QOSFC Report	Clark 18'; Holt 30'; Smith 44'; Reilly 85'	Attendance: 516

17 July 2012 Friendly	Queen's Park	0–2	Queen of the South	Lesser Hampden
		QOSFC Report	Reilly 5'; A. Trialist 80'	Attendance: Closed doors

21 July 2012 Friendly	Workington	0–2	Queen of the South	Borough Park
		QOSFC Report	Clark 7'; Smith 45'	Attendance: 236

=== Scottish Second Division ===
11 August 2012 1	Queen of the South	2–0	Forfar Athletic	Palmerston Park
15:00	Lyle 32'; Reilly 89'	QOSFC Report		Attendance: 1,247; Referee: Tumilty

18 August 2012 2	East Fife	0–0	Queen of the South	Bayview Stadium
15:00		QOSFC Report	Johnston (yellow card) 69' (yellow-red card) 88'	Attendance: 628; Referee: Roache

25 August 2012 3	Queen of the South	1–0	Albion Rovers	Palmerston Park
15:00	Lyle 21'	QOSFC Report		Attendance: 1,426; Referee: Charleston

1 September 2012 4	Queen of the South	6–0	Arbroath	Palmerston Park
15:00	Gibson 17'; Clark 37'; Reilly 53', 64', 90'; Smith 87'	QOSFC Report		Attendance: 1,554; Referee: McKendrick

15 September 2012 5	Ayr United	2–4	Queen of the South	Somerset Park
15:00	MacKinnon 9', 19'	QOSFC Report	Clark 16'; Burns 31'; Reilly 62', 69'	Attendance: 1,373; Referee: Muir

22 September 2012 6	Brechin City	0–3	Queen of the South	Glebe Park
15:00		QOSFC Report	Higgins 7'; Lyle 40'; Gibson 53' (pen.)	Attendance: 538; Referee: Robertson

29 September 2012 7	Queen of the South	1–0	Alloa Athletic	Palmerston Park
15:00	Clark 67'	QOSFC Report		Attendance: 1,573; Referee: Beaton

6 October 2012 8	Stranraer	0–2	Queen of the South	Stair Park
15:00		QOSFC Report	Reilly 28'; Clark 90'	Attendance: 1,015; Referee: Cook

20 October 2012 9	Queen of the South	2–2	Stenhousemuir	Palmerston Park
15:00	Durnan 2'; Young (red card) 45'; Clark 48'; Holt (red card) 90'	QOSFC Report	Gemmell 68'; Ferguson 71' (pen.)	Attendance: 1,531; Referee: Hilland

28 October 2012 10	Queen of the South	1–0	East Fife	Palmerston Park
15:00	Lyle 4'	QOSFC Report		Attendance: 1,577; Referee: Salmond

17 November 2012 11	Arbroath	2–3	Queen of the South	Gayfield Park
15:00	Doris 45' (pen.), 90' (pen.)	QOSFC Report	Clark 22'; Higgins 28'; Durnan 60'	Attendance: 691; Referee: Roache

20 November 2012 12	Forfar Athletic	1–5	Queen of the South	Station Park
19:30	Dunlop (red card) 21'; Swankie 25'	QOSFC Report	Clark 5', 49'; McGuffie 22' (pen.); Durnan 27'; Hopkirk 81'	Attendance: 391; Referee: Aitken

24 November 2012 13	Queen of the South	2–0	Ayr United	Palmerston Park
15:00	McGuffie 16'; Clark 55'	QOSFC Report		Attendance: 1,953; Referee: Anderson

8 December 2012	Alloa Athletic	P–P	Queen of the South	Recreation Park
15:00		BBC Sport News
Note: Postponed due to frozen pitch

11 December 2012 14	Alloa Athletic	1–0	Queen of the South	Recreation Park
19:30	McCord 58' (pen.)	QOSFC Report		Attendance: 475; Referee: Colvin

15 December 2012 15	Queen of the South	1–0	Brechin City	Palmerston Park
15:00	Carmichael 21'	QOSFC Report		Attendance: 1,419; Referee: Salmond

26 December 2012 16	Queen of the South	4–1	Stranraer	Palmerston Park
15:00	Clark 31', 63', 70'; Smith 84'	QOSFC Report	McKeown 20'	Attendance: 2,122; Referee: Graham

29 December 2012 17	Stenhousemuir	1–3	Queen of the South	Ochilview Park
15:00	Kean 90'	QOSFC Report	Reilly 32', 69'; Clark 55'	Attendance: 632; Referee: Tumilty

2 January 2013 18	Ayr United	1–5	Queen of the South	Somerset Park
15:00	Winters 30'	QOSFC Report	McStay 32' (o.g.); Clark 43'; Carmichael 47'; McCann 69' (o.g.); Lyle 72'	Attendance: 1,216; Referee: Dallas

5 January 2013 19	Queen of the South	5–1	Arbroath	Palmerston Park
15:00	Durnan (red card) 20'; Lyle 54'; Clark 58', 84'; Carmichael 65'; McKenna 81'	QOSFC Report	Doris 18'	Attendance: 1,693; Referee: Finnie

12 January 2013 20	Albion Rovers	0–3	Queen of the South	Cliftonhill Stadium
15:00		QOSFC Report	Clark 41'; Lyle 68'; Young 76'	Attendance: 810; Referee: Charleston

19 January 2013 21	Queen of the South	3–1	Forfar Athletic	Palmerston Park
15:00	McGuffie 11'; Lyle 19'; Clark 70'	QOSFC Report	Templeman 15'	Attendance: 1,481; Referee: Colvin

26 January 2013	Brechin City	P–P	Queen of the South	Glebe Park
15:00		BBC Sport News
Note: Postponed due to frozen pitch

2 February 2013 22	Queen of the South	0–0	Alloa Athletic	Palmerston Park
15:00		QOSFC Report		Attendance: 1,738; Referee: Allan

9 February 2013 23	Queen of the South	2–1	Stenhousemuir	Palmerston Park
15:00	Young 34'; Mitchell 45'	QOSFC Report	Corcoran 47'	Attendance: 1,354; Referee: Robertson

16 February 2013 24	Stranraer	0–5	Queen of the South	Stair Park
15:00	Mitchell (red card) 21'	QOSFC Report	Burns 17'; McGuffie 24' (pen.); Lyle 39', 71'; Clark 59'	Attendance: 810; Referee: Salmond

23 February 2013 25	Queen of the South	3–0	Albion Rovers	Palmerston Park
15:00	Lyle 43'; Clark 76'; Durnan 81'	QOSFC Report		Attendance: 1,520; Referee: Anderson

26 February 2013	Brechin City	P–P	Queen of the South	Glebe Park
19:45		BBC Sport News
Note: Postponed due to waterlogged pitch

2 March 2013 26	East Fife	2–3	Queen of the South	Bayview Stadium
15:00	McManus 64' Gormley 86'	QOSFC Report	Reilly 15'; Clark 66'; Durnan 69'	Attendance: 627; Referee: Northcroft

9 March 2013 27	Queen of the South	2–0	Ayr United	Palmerston Park
15:00	Lyle 45'; Reilly 60'	QOSFC Report		Attendance: 1,471; Referee: Charleston

16 March 2013 28	Arbroath	1–1	Queen of the South	Gayfield Park
15:00	Smith 83'	QOSFC Report	Clark 90'	Attendance: 656; Referee: Tumilty

23 March 2013 29	Alloa Athletic	1–2	Queen of the South	Recreation Park
15:00	Cawley 56'	QOSFC Report	Clark 40'; McGuffie 85' (pen.)	Attendance: 647; Referee: Dallas

27 March 2013 30	Brechin City	0–6	Queen of the South	Station Park
19:45	McLauchlan (yellow card) 41' (yellow-red card) 76'	QOSFC Report	Clark 1', 42'; Paton 3', 36'; Moyes 18' (o.g.); Reilly 57'	Attendance: 627; Referee: Cook

30 March 2013 31	Queen of the South	2–1	Brechin City	Palmerston Park
15:00	Durnan 16'; Lyle 73'	QOSFC Report	Trouten 75' (pen.)	Attendance: 2,026; Referee: Aitken

13 April 2013 32	Queen of the South	2–0	Stranraer	Palmerston Park
15:00	Holt 31'; Clark 76'	QOSFC Report		Attendance: 1,806; Referee: Graham

16 April 2013 33	Stenhousemuir	2–1	Queen of the South	Ochilview Park
19:30	Smith 28'; Dickson 72'	QOSFC Report	Mitchell 44'	Attendance: 504; Referee: Charleston

20 April 2013 34	Forfar Athletic	0–4	Queen of the South	Station Park
15:00		QOSFC Report	Paton 33'; Clark 54', 56', 85'	Attendance: 555; Referee: Roache

27 April 2013 35	Queen of the South	2–2	East Fife	Palmerston Park
15:00	Clark 87', 90'	QOSFC Report	Campbell 36'; Wardlaw 76'	Attendance: 2,568; Referee: McKendrick

4 May 2013 36	Albion Rovers	0–1	Queen of the South	Cliftonhill Stadium
15:00		QOSFC Report	Clark 71'	Attendance: 853; Referee: Graham

=== Scottish Challenge Cup ===
28 July 2012 Round 1	Dumbarton	0–1	Queen of the South	Bet Butler Stadium
15:00		QOSFC Report	Clark 69'	Attendance: 684; Referee: Hilland

14 August 2012 Round 2	Greenock Morton	1–2 (a.e.t.)	Queen of the South	Cappielow Park
19:30	Tidser 38'	QOSFC Report	Durnan 66'; Clark 108'	Attendance: 1,178; Referee: Salmond

18 September 2012 Round 3	Rangers	2–2 (a.e.t.) (3–4 p)	Queen of the South	Ibrox Stadium
19:45	McKay 55'; Kyle (yellow card) 63' (red card) 66'; McCulloch 72' (pen.)	QOSFC Report	Clark 49'; Gibson (yellow card) 62' (yellow-red card) 90'; Reilly 90'	Attendance: 23,932; Referee: O'Reilly
	Penalties
	McCulloch (penalty scored); Shiels (penalty missed); Naismith (penalty scored); Black (penalty scored); Argyriou (penalty missed)		(penalty missed) Lyle; (penalty scored) Clark; (penalty scored) Young; (penalty scored) Reilly; (penalty scored) McGuffie

14 October 2012 Round 4	Queen of the South	2–1 (a.e.t.)	Arbroath	Palmerston Park
15:00	Young 9'; McGuffie 117'	QOSFC Report	Keddie 58'	Attendance: 2,310; Referee: Clancy

7 April 2013 Final	Queen of the South	1–1 (a.e.t.) (6–5 p)	Partick Thistle	Braidwood Motor Company Stadium
16:05	Clark 101'	QOSFC Report	Muirhead (red card) 119'; Doolan 120'	Attendance: 9,452; Referee: Allan
	Penalties
	Young (penalty scored); Carmichael (penalty missed); Fitzpatrick (penalty scored); Robinson (penalty scored); Reilly (penalty scored); Mitchell (penalty scored); Higgins (penalty scored)		(penalty missed) O'Donnell; (penalty scored) Erskine; (penalty scored) Welsh; (penalty scored) Sinclair; (penalty scored) Forbes; (penalty scored) Doolan; (penalty missed) Balatoni

=== Scottish League Cup ===
4 August 2012 Round 1	Queen of the South	5–2	Alloa Athletic	Palmerston Park
15:00	Mitchell 9'; Higgins 67'; Clark 83', 85'; Lyle 89'	QOSFC Report	Gordon 64'; Grehan 78'	Attendance: 967; Referee: Colvin

28 August 2012 Round 2	Queen of the South	2–0	Hibernian	Palmerston Park
19:45	Clark 13'; Reilly 42'	QOSFC Report		Attendance: 2,658; Referee: Madden

25 September 2012 Round 3	Queen of the South	0–1	Dundee United	Palmerston Park
19:45		QOSFC Report	Russell 28'	Attendance: 2,374; Referee: Norris

=== Scottish Cup ===
3 November 2012 Round 3	Edinburgh City	0–2	Queen of the South	Meadowbank Stadium
15:00		QOSFC Report	Clark 42'; Reilly 65'	Attendance: 1,038; Referee: Northcroft

1 December 2012 Round 4	Kilmarnock	2–1	Queen of the South	Rugby Park
15:00	Sheridan 8'; Perez 69'	QOSFC Report	McKenna (red card) 2'; Clark 77'	Attendance: 4,295; Referee: Tumilty

== Player statistics ==
=== Captains ===
No.	P	Name	Country	No. games	Notes
	DF	Chris Higgins	(Scotland)	40	Club Captain
	DF	Ryan McGuffie	(Scotland)	6	Vice Captain

Last updated: 5 May 2013
Source: Competitive match reports.
Competitive matches only
Matches started as captain only
Country: FIFA nationality; No.: Squad number; P: Position; Name: Player name; No. Games: Number of games started as captain.

=== Squad ===
Last updated 27 July 2013

No.	Pos	Nat	Player	Total		Second Division		Challenge Cup		League Cup		Scottish Cup	
No.	Pos	Nat	Player	Apps	Goals	Apps	Goals	Apps	Goals	Apps	Goals	Apps	Goals
	GK	(England) ENG	James Atkinson	1	0	0+1	0	0+0	0	0+0	0	0+0	0
	GK	(England) ENG	Lee Robinson	46	0	36+0	0	5+0	0	3+0	0	2+0	0
	DF	(Scotland) SCO	Steven Black	15	0	4+7	0	0+2	0	0+1	0	1+0	0
	DF	(Scotland) SCO	Mark Durnan	41	7	32+0	6	5+0	1	3+0	0	1+0	0
	DF	(Scotland) SCO	Chris Higgins	41	3	32+0	2	4+0	0	3+0	1	2+0	0
	DF	(Scotland) SCO	Ryan McGuffie	34	6	23+4	5	4+0	1	1+0	0	2+0	0
	DF	(Scotland) SCO	Marc Fitzpatrick	5	0	3+1	0	1+0	0	0+0	0	0+0	0
	DF	(Scotland) SCO	Chris Mitchell	42	3	33+0	2	4+0	0	3+0	1	2+0	0
	DF	(Scotland) SCO	Kevin Holt	36	1	25+3	1	4+0	0	3+0	0	0+1	0
	MF	(Scotland) SCO	Paul Burns	28	2	23+2	2	0+0	0	0+1	0	2+0	0
	MF	(Scotland) SCO	Daniel Carmichael	43	3	34+0	3	5+0	0	2+0	0	2+0	0
	MF	(Scotland) SCO	Nicky Clark	46	41	36+0	32	5+0	4	3+0	3	2+0	2
	MF	(Scotland) SCO	David Hopkirk	5	1	0+4	1	0+1	0	0+0	0	0+0	0
	MF	(Scotland) SCO	Willie Gibson	23	2	11+6	2	2+0	0	1+1	0	0+2	0
	MF	(Scotland) SCO	Allan Johnston	7	0	1+4	0	1+1	0	0+0	0	0+0	0
	MF	(Scotland) SCO	Ian McShane	2	0	0+0	0	0+0	0	0+1	0	0+1	0
	MF	(Scotland) SCO	Stephen McKenna	40	1	28+3	1	4+0	0	3+0	0	2+0	0
	MF	(Scotland) SCO	Dan Orsi	17	0	4+8	0	1+2	0	2+0	0	0+0	0
	MF	(Scotland) SCO	Pat Slattery	4	0	3+1	0	0+0	0	0+0	0	0+0	0
	MF	(Scotland) SCO	Derek Young	33	3	22+4	2	3+0	1	3+0	0	1+0	0
	FW	(Scotland) SCO	Derek Lyle	39	14	23+6	13	1+4	0	2+1	1	2+0	0
	FW	(Scotland) SCO	Gavin Reilly	41	15	17+14	12	3+2	1	1+2	1	1+1	1
	FW	(Scotland) SCO	Kevin Smith	20	2	0+18	2	1+1	0	0+0	0	0+0	0
	FW	(Scotland) SCO	Michael Paton	11	3	6+4	3	1+0	0	0+0	0	0+0	0

=== Disciplinary record ===
Includes all competitive matches.

Last updated 27 July 2013

Nation	Position	Name	Second Division		Challenge Cup		League Cup		Scottish Cup		Total	
Nation	Position	Name	Booked	Sent off (straight red)	Booked	Sent off (straight red)	Booked	Sent off (straight red)	Booked	Sent off (straight red)	Booked	Sent off (straight red)
(England)	GK	James Atkinson	0	0	0	0	0	0	0	0	0	0
(England)	GK	Lee Robinson	1	0	1	0	0	0	0	0	2	0
(Scotland)	DF	Steven Black	0	0	0	0	0	0	0	0	0	0
(Scotland)	DF	Mark Durnan	4	1	0	0	0	0	0	0	4	1
(Scotland)	DF	Chris Higgins	7	0	3	0	0	0	0	0	10	0
(Scotland)	DF	Ryan McGuffie	0	0	2	0	0	0	0	0	2	0
(Scotland)	DF	Marc Fitzpatrick	0	0	0	0	0	0	0	0	0	0
(Scotland)	DF	Chris Mitchell	5	0	0	0	0	0	0	0	5	0
(Scotland)	DF	Kevin Holt	4	1	2	0	0	0	0	0	6	1
(Scotland)	MF	Paul Burns	2	0	0	0	0	0	0	0	2	0
(Scotland)	MF	Daniel Carmichael	2	0	1	0	0	0	0	0	3	0
(Scotland)	MF	Nicky Clark	1	0	0	0	0	0	0	0	1	0
(Scotland)	MF	David Hopkirk	0	0	0	0	0	0	0	0	0	0
(Scotland)	MF	Willie Gibson	2	0	2	1	0	0	0	0	4	1
(Scotland)	MF	Allan Johnston	2	1	0	0	0	0	0	0	2	1
(Scotland)	MF	Ian McShane	0	0	0	0	0	0	0	0	0	0
(Scotland)	MF	Stephen McKenna	6	0	3	0	1	0	0	1	10	1
(Scotland)	MF	Dan Orsi	0	0	0	0	0	0	0	0	0	0
(Scotland)	MF	Pat Slattery	0	0	0	0	0	0	0	0	0	0
(Scotland)	MF	Derek Young	4	1	1	0	0	0	0	0	5	1
(Scotland)	FW	Derek Lyle	1	0	1	0	0	0	1	0	3	0
(Scotland)	FW	Gavin Reilly	1	0	0	0	0	0	0	0	1	0
(Scotland)	FW	Kevin Smith	0	0	0	0	0	0	0	0	0	0
(Scotland)	FW	Michael Paton	0	0	0	0	0	0	0	0	0	0

=== Manager of the Month Awards ===
Last updated 14 June 2013

Nation	Name	Month
(Scotland)	Allan Johnston	August
(Scotland)	Allan Johnston	September
(Scotland)	Allan Johnston	December
(Scotland)	Allan Johnston	January
(Scotland)	Allan Johnston	March

=== Top Scorers ===
Last updated on 4 May 2013

Position	Nation	Name	Second Division	Scottish Cup	League Cup	Challenge Cup	Total
1	(Scotland)	Nicky Clark	32	2	3	4	41
2	(Scotland)	Gavin Reilly	12	1	1	1	15
3	(Scotland)	Derek Lyle	13	0	1	0	14
4	(Scotland)	Mark Durnan	6	0	0	1	7
5	(Scotland)	Ryan McGuffie	5	0	0	1	6
6	(Scotland)	Chris Higgins	2	0	1	0	3
=	(Scotland)	Danny Carmichael	3	0	0	0	3
=	(Scotland)	Derek Young	2	0	0	1	3
=	(Scotland)	Chris Mitchell	2	0	1	0	3
=	(Scotland)	Michael Paton	3	0	0	0	3
11	(Scotland)	Willie Gibson	2	0	0	0	2
=	(Scotland)	Paul Burns	2	0	0	0	2
=	(Scotland)	Kevin Smith	2	0	0	0	2
14	(Scotland)	Stephen McKenna	1	0	0	0	1
=	(Scotland)	David Hopkirk	1	0	0	0	1
=	(Scotland)	Kevin Holt	1	0	0	0	1

=== Clean sheets ===
R	Pos	Nat	Name	Second Division	Scottish Cup	League Cup	Challenge Cup	Total
1	GK	(England)	Lee Robinson	19	1	1	1	22
			Totals	19	1	1	1	22

Last updated: 4 May 2013
Source: Match reports in Competitive matches

== Team statistics ==
=== League table ===
Pos	Team	Pld	W	D	L	GF	GA	GD	Pts	Promotion, qualification or relegation
1	Queen of the South (C, P)	36	29	5	2	92	23	+69	92	Promotion to the Championship
2	Alloa Athletic (O, P)	36	20	7	9	62	35	+27	67	Qualification for the First Division play-offs
3	Brechin City	36	19	4	13	72	59	+13	61	Qualification for the First Division play-offs
4	Forfar Athletic	36	17	3	16	67	74	−7	54	Qualification for the First Division play-offs
5	Arbroath	36	15	7	14	47	57	−10	52	

Source: SPFL Archive
Rules for classification: 1) points; 2) goal difference; 3) number of goals scored.
(C) Champions; (O) Play-off winners; (P) Promoted

=== Division summary ===
Round	1	2	3	4	5	6	7	8	9	10	11	12	13	14	15	16	17	18	19	20	21	22	23	24	25	26	27	28	29	30	31	32	33	34	35	36
Ground	H	A	H	H	A	A	H	A	H	H	A	A	H	A	H	H	A	A	H	A	H	H	H	A	H	A	H	A	A	A	H	H	A	A	H	A
Result	W	D	W	W	W	W	W	W	D	W	W	W	W	L	W	W	W	W	W	W	W	D	W	W	W	W	W	D	W	W	W	W	L	W	D	W
Position	1	4	2	1	1	1	1	1	1	1	1	1	1	1	1	1	1	1	1	1	1	1	1	1	1	1	1	1	1	1	1	1	1	1	1	1

Updated to match(es) played on 4 May 2013. Source:
A = Away; H = Home; W = Win; D = Draw; L = Loss

== Transfers ==
=== Players in ===
Player	From	Fee
(Scotland) Willie Gibson	(Scotland) Falkirk	Free
(Scotland) Mark Durnan	(Scotland) St Johnstone	Free
(Scotland) Chris Mitchell	(England) Bradford City	Free
(Scotland) Derek Lyle	(Scotland) Cowdenbeath	Free
(Scotland) Derek Young	(Scotland) Greenock Morton	Free
(Scotland) David Hopkirk	(Scotland) Hamilton Academical	Free
(Scotland) Paul Burns	(Scotland) Dunfermline Athletic	Free
(Scotland) Michael Paton	(Scotland) Aberdeen	Free
(Scotland) Marc Fitzpatrick	(Scotland) Ross County	Free

=== Players out ===
Player	To	Fee
(Scotland) Steven Degnan	(Scotland) Gretna FC 2008	Free
(Scotland) Marc McCusker	(Scotland) Dumbarton	Free
(Scotland) Sam Parkin	(Scotland) St Mirren	Free
(Scotland) Scott McLaughlin	(Scotland) Peterhead	Free
(Scotland) Stephen Simmons	(Scotland) Alloa Athletic	Free
(Scotland) Tom Brighton	(Scotland) Irvine Meadow	Free
(Scotland) Ryan Smylie	(Scotland) Kilbirnie Ladeside	Free
(Scotland) Craig Reid	(Scotland) Greenock Morton	Free
(Scotland) David Hopkirk	(Scotland) Annan Athletic	Loan
(Scotland) David Hopkirk	(Scotland) Annan Athletic	Free
(Scotland) Dan Orsi	(Scotland) Annan Athletic	Loan
(Scotland) Steven Black	(Scotland) Annan Athletic	Loan
(Scotland) Willie Gibson	(England) Celtic Nation	Free

== See also ==
- List of Queen of the South F.C. seasons
