= 2013 Scottish Challenge Cup final =

- Event: 2012–13 Scottish Challenge Cup
Queen of the South	Partick Thistle
1	1
- After extra time Queen of the South won 6–5 on penalties
- Date: 7 April 2013
- Venue: Almondvale Stadium, Livingston
- Referee: Crawford Allan
- Attendance: 9,452

The 2013 Scottish Challenge Cup final, also known as the Ramsdens Cup final for sponsorship reasons, was an association football match between Queen of the South and Partick Thistle on 7 April 2013 at Almondvale Stadium in Livingston. It was the 22nd final of the Scottish Challenge Cup since it was first organised in 1990 to celebrate the centenary of the Scottish Football League.

Both teams progressed through four elimination rounds to reach the final. The match was Queen of the South's fourth appearance in the final of the competition, the last in 2010, whilst it was Partick Thistle's first cup final in 42 years since the League Cup in 1971. The tournament was contested by clubs below the Scottish Premier League; Partick Thistle from the First Division and Queen of the South from the Second Division.

The scoreline was 0–0 after 90 minutes of normal time which forced 30 minutes of extra time to be played. Queen of the South scored the first goal of the game in the 101st minute from Nicky Clark. Partick Thistle were awarded a penalty kick with only two minutes left to play and missed; Aaron Muirhead, who missed the penalty, was then sent off for headbutting Chris Higgins. Partick equalised the score to 1–1 in the final minute of the match from Kris Doolan and take the game to penalties. Queen of the South emerged victorious after winning the shoot-out 6–5.

== Route to the final ==
The competition is a knock-out tournament and in 2012–13 was contested by 32 teams; the 30 clubs that played in the First, Second and Third Divisions of the Scottish Football League and two Highland Football League clubs by invitation. For the first and second rounds only, the draw was divided into two geographical regions – north/east and south/west. Teams were paired at random and the winner of each match progressed to the next round and the loser was eliminated.

=== Queen of the South ===
Round	Opposition	Score
First round	Dumbarton (a)	1–0
Second round	Greenock Morton (a)	2–1 (a.e.t.)
Quarter-final	Rangers (a)	2–2 (a.e.t.) (4–3 pens.)
Semi-final	Arbroath (h)	2–1 (a.e.t.)

=== Partick Thistle ===
Round	Opposition	Score
First round	Clyde (a)	1–0
Second round	Queen's Park (a)	5–4
Quarter-final	Raith Rovers (h)	3–0
Semi-final	Cowdenbeath (a)	1–0

== Match ==
=== Details ===
7 April 2013
16:05 BST

Queen of the South	1–1 (a.e.t.)	Partick Thistle
Clark 101'	Report	Doolan 120'
Penalties
Young (penalty scored); Carmichael (penalty missed); Fitzpatrick (penalty scored); Robinson (penalty scored); Reilly (penalty scored); Mitchell (penalty scored); Higgins (penalty scored)	6–5	(penalty missed) O'Donnell; (penalty scored) Erskine; (penalty scored) Welsh; (penalty scored) Taylor-Sinclair; (penalty scored) Forbes; (penalty scored) Doolan; (penalty missed) Balatoni

Almondvale Stadium, Livingston
Attendance: 9,452
Referee: Crawford Allan

Queen of the South	Partick Thistle

GK	1	(England) Lee Robinson	(yellow card) 72'
DF	2	(Scotland) Chris Mitchell
DF	3	(Scotland) Marc Fitzpatrick
DF	4	(Scotland) Mark Durnan
DF	5	(Scotland) Chris Higgins	(yellow card) 28'
MF	6	(Scotland) Derek Young
MF	8	(Scotland) Stephen McKenna	(yellow card) 120'
MF	10	(Scotland) Nicky Clark		(substituted off) 101'
MF	7	(Scotland) Daniel Carmichael	(yellow card) 72'
FW	9	(Scotland) Derek Lyle		(substituted off) 77'
FW	11	(Scotland) Michael Paton		(substituted off) 115'
Substitutes:
GK	12	(England) James Atkinson
DF	16	(Scotland) Steven Black		(substituted in) 115'
MF	17	(Scotland) Allan Johnston
FW	14	(Scotland) Gavin Reilly		(substituted in) 77'
FW	15	(Scotland) Kevin Smith		(substituted in) 101'
Manager:
(Scotland) Allan Johnston

GK	1	(Scotland) Scott Fox
DF	2	(Scotland) Stephen O'Donnell
DF	3	(Scotland) Aaron Taylor-Sinclair	(yellow card) 55'
DF	5	(Scotland) Aaron Muirhead	(red card) 119'
MF	4	(Scotland) Stuart Bannigan		(substituted off) 94'
MF	6	(England) Conrad Balatoni
MF	7	(Scotland) Sean Welsh
FW	8	(England) James Craigen	(yellow card) 34'
MF	11	(Scotland) Chris Erskine
FW	9	(Scotland) Steven Craig		(substituted off) 66'
FW	10	(Scotland) Steven Lawless		(substituted off) 60'
Substitutes:
GK	12	(Belgium) Glenn Daniels
FW	17	(Scotland) Mark McGuigan
FW	14	(Scotland) Kris Doolan		(substituted in) 66'
MF	15	(Scotland) Ross Forbes		(substituted in) 94'
FW	16	(England) Christie Elliott	(yellow card) 120'	(substituted in) 60'
Manager:
(Scotland) Alan Archibald

Match officials

- Assistant referees:
  - Stuart MacMillan
  - Graeme Stewart
- Fourth official: Paul Robertson

Match rules

- 90 minutes.
- 30 minutes of extra-time if necessary.
- Penalty shoot-out if scores still level.
- Five named substitutes.
- Maximum of three substitutions.
