= Chris Higgins (footballer) =

Scottish footballer (born 1985)

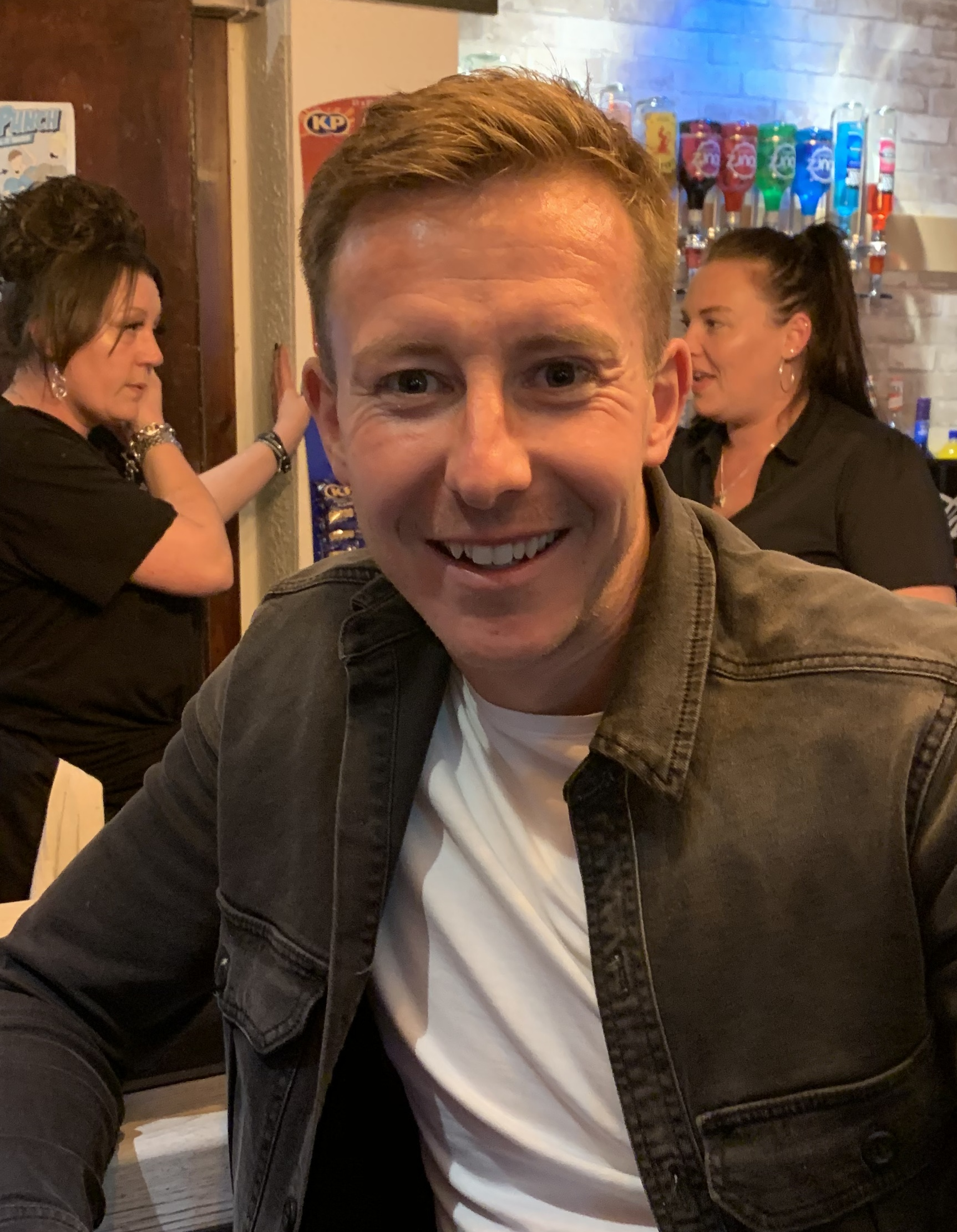

Personal information
- Full name: Christopher James Higgins
- Date of birth: 4 July 1985 (age 41)
- Place of birth: Broxburn, Scotland
- Height: 6 ft 1 in (1.85 m)
- Position: Defender

Youth career
- 2001–2004: Motherwell

Senior career*
Years	Team	Apps	(Gls)
2004–2005	Motherwell	0	(0)
2005–2009	Clyde	132	(6)
2009–2011	Dunfermline Athletic	38	(1)
2011–2017	Queen of the South	180	(7)
2017–2019	Ayr United	22	(3)
2019	→ East Fife (loan)	12	(0)
2019–2022	East Fife	77	(2)
- * Club domestic league appearances and goals

Christopher James Higgins (born 4 July 1985) is a Scottish former professional footballer. Higgins played for Motherwell, Clyde, Dunfermline Athletic, Queen of the South, Ayr United and East Fife.

== Career ==
=== Early years ===
Born in Broxburn, Higgins started his career as a youth player at Motherwell, but failed to break into the first team squad and had no appearances.

=== Clyde ===
Higgins signed for Clyde on 12 June 2005, and made his début on 30 July 2005 in a Scottish Challenge Cup match versus Brechin City. Higgins was a vital part of the team in his defensive position at centre-half and only missed two league matches of the 2005–06 season. Higgins was part of the Clyde team that defeated Celtic in a 2–1 shock victory in the third round of the Scottish Cup on 8 January 2006. The former Manchester United captain, Roy Keane happened to be playing in his first match for Celtic that same day.

Higgins scored his first goal for Clyde against Greenock Morton on 27 September 2006 in a 3–1 win in the Challenge Cup. Higgins played in the Cumbernauld-based club's run to the 2006 Scottish Challenge Cup final where they faced Ross County. With the match level at 1–1 after extra-time the game was decided on penalties. Higgins missed a penalty in the shoot-out that allowed Jason Crooks the opportunity to win the trophy for Ross County. Crooks scored his resultant penalty and the Dingwall club won 5–4 in the shoot-out.

Higgins was extremely consistent in his second season at Clyde, missing only two league matches due to suspension. Higgins was an integral part of the Clyde defence that conceded the fewest goals in the division. Higgins played his 100th match for Clyde on Boxing Day 2007, in a Scottish First Division match against Hamilton Academical.

Higgins was the Clyde captain on the final day of the season in his 100th league appearance. Despite winning 3–0 against Stirling Albion, Clyde still finished in the play-off position as Greenock Morton finished ahead of Clyde on goal difference.

Higgins won Clyde's official website's Player of the Year Award for season 2008–09. After Clyde's relegation to the Scottish Second Division Higgins was one of thirteen players released in June 2009 with the club stating that they could not afford to offer new contracts to all of these players.

=== Dunfermline Athletic ===
After leaving Clyde, Higgins then signed for Dunfermline Athletic. Higgins' debut was on 22 July 2009, in a 2–1 win against Arbroath in the Challenge Cup. Higgins was at East End Park for two seasons and scored one goal in a 6–1 win against Queen of the South on 16 April 2011. In Higgins' second season at Dunfermline Athletic the club won the Scottish First Division and won promotion to the Scottish Premier League. However, two days before the club were due to receive the trophy Higgins was told that he would not be retained for the following season.

=== Queen of the South ===
On 4 July 2011, manager Gus MacPherson announced on the website of Dumfries club, Queen of the South that Higgins had agreed terms to join the Palmerston Park club. MacPherson commented, "He`s experienced, versatile and can play on three different areas on the left flank.". Higgins' Queens' debut was on 23 July 2011, in a 2–0 defeat against Ayr United after extra time in the Challenge Cup. Despite the club being relegated at the end of his first season, Higgins signed a new contract on 30 May 2012.

Higgins was appointed club captain in the summer of 2012 and Queens won the 2012–13 Scottish Second Division and the Scottish Challenge Cup for the double, defeating Partick Thistle 6–5 on penalties after a 1–1 draw at the end of extra-time, after no goals were scored during the regulation 90 minutes. Higgins was involved in an incident with Firhill defender and Dumfries born Aaron Muirhead, who was then shown a red card for headbutting Higgins after Lee Robinson had saved Muirhead's penalty just before the end of extra-time.

Higgins completed 200 first-team appearances for Queen of the South after playing against Dumbarton on 1 October 2016. Higgins presentation was conducted before the home match with Linfield in the 2016–17 Scottish Challenge Cup on 9 October 2016 that Queens won 2–0 after extra time. Higgins lost the club captaincy after the arrival of John Rankin on 5 January 2017 from Falkirk, as decided by the recently appointed Queens manager, Gary Naysmith. Higgins contract at Queens wasn't renewed during May 2017, so he was released after six seasons, four and a half of those as the club captain.

=== Ayr United ===
On 18 May 2017, Higgins signed for Scottish League One club Ayr United, deciding to go full-time after their recent relegation from the Scottish Championship, after leaving Queen of the South. Ayr were promoted back to the Championship in 2018, and Higgins was loaned to League One club East Fife in February 2019.

=== East Fife ===
On 27 May 2019, Higgins signed for the Fifers on a permanent basis.

Higgins retired from professional football at the end of the 2021–22 season, aged 36, two months short of his 37th birthday.

== Other work ==
From 2016, Higgins (who had trained to become a personal trainer) had a coaching role with the youth academy teams at Heart of Midlothian. While still an active player, as of 2021 he also took on an administrative role as 'Personal Development Officer' at the footballers' union PFA Scotland with the aim of assisting players find work alongside or after their careers in the game.

== Career statistics ==
As of 6 November 2021

Appearances and goals by club, season and competition
Club	Season	League			Scottish Cup		League Cup		Other		Total	
Club	Season	Division	Apps	Goals	Apps	Goals	Apps	Goals	Apps	Goals	Apps	Goals
Clyde	2005–06	Scottish First Division	34	0	2	0	2	0	1 (Note: Appearances in Scottish Challenge Cup)	0	39	0
Clyde	2006–07	Scottish First Division	34	2	1	0	1	0	4	1	40	3
Clyde	2007–08	Scottish First Division	32	2	2	0	1	0	6 (Note: Two appearances in Scottish Challenge Cup, four appearances in Scottish First Division play-offs)	0	41	2
Clyde	2008–09	Scottish First Division	32	2	2	0	2	0	3	0	39	2
Clyde	Total		132	6	7	0	6	0	14	1	159	7
Dunfermline Athletic	2009–10	Scottish First Division	17	0	0	0	2	0	1	0	20	0
Dunfermline Athletic	2010–11	Scottish First Division	21	1	0	0	1	0	1	0	23	1
Dunfermline Athletic	Total		38	1	0	0	3	0	2	0	43	1
Queen of the South	2011–12	Scottish First Division	32	2	3	0	3	0	1	0	39	2
Queen of the South	2012–13	Scottish Second Division	32	2	2	0	3	1	4	0	41	3
Queen of the South	2013–14	Scottish Championship	26	2	3	0	2	1	3 (Note: Two appearances in Scottish Challenge Cup, one appearance in Scottish Premiership play-offs)	0	34	3
Queen of the South	2014–15	Scottish Championship	34	0	3	0	2	0	2 (Note: Appearances in Scottish Premiership play-offs)	0	41	0
Queen of the South	2015–16	Scottish Championship	33	1	1	0	2	0	2	0	38	1
Queen of the South	2016–17	Scottish Championship	23	0	1	0	4	0	1	0	29	0
Queen of the South	Total		180	7	13	0	16	2	13	0	222	9
Ayr United	2017–18	Scottish League One	19	3	0	0	5	0	2	0	26	3
Ayr United	2018–19	Scottish Championship	3	0	2	0	0	0	0	0	5	0
Ayr United	Total		22	3	2	0	5	0	2	0	31	3
East Fife (loan)	2018–19	Scottish League One	12	0	0	0	0	0	0	0	12	0
East Fife	2019–20	Scottish League One	28	2	1	0	4	0	1	0	34	2
East Fife	2020–21	Scottish League One	18	0	1	0	4	0	0	0	23	0
East Fife	2021–22	Scottish League One	11	0	0	0	4	0	1	0	16	0
East Fife	Total		57	2	2	0	12	0	2	0	73	2
Career total			412	19	24	0	42	2	33	1	540	22

== Honours ==
Clyde

- Scottish Challenge Cup runner-up: 2006–07

Dunfermline Athletic

- Scottish First Division: 2010–11

Queen of the South

- Scottish Second Division: 2012–13
- Scottish Challenge Cup: 2012–13
