= Michael Paton =

Scottish footballer (born 1989)

Personal information
- Date of birth: 25 March 1989 (age 37)
- Place of birth: Greenock, Scotland
- Position: Midfielder

Team information
- Current team: Caledonian Braves - Assistant Manager

Youth career
- 2005–2007: Aberdeen

Senior career*
Years	Team	Apps	(Gls)
2007–2012	Aberdeen	57	(6)
2008	→ Brechin City (loan)	16	(4)
2011	→ Stockport County (loan)	16	(4)
2013–2015	Queen of the South	73	(12)
2015–2018	Dunfermline Athletic	82	(7)
2018–2019	Dumbarton	30	(2)
2019–2020	Queen of the South	27	(1)
2020–2022	Brechin City	50	(5)
2022–2025	Albion Rovers	20	(2)

Managerial career
- 2020–2021: Brechin City
- * Club domestic league appearances and goals as of 16 August 2023

Michael Paton (born 25 March 1989) is a Scottish former professional football player and coach, who joined Caledonian Braves as assistant manager in 2026. Paton has previously played for Aberdeen, Dunfermline Athletic, Dumbarton, Stockport County and Queen of the South over two spells. He then transferred as the player-manager of Brechin City and was player-coach at Albion Rovers before retiring from playing to join Kelty Hearts as assistant manager. During his playing career, Paton notably played at every professional football stadium in Scotland.

== Career ==
=== Aberdeen ===
Born in Greenock, Paton was a product of Aberdeen's youth academy and first played senior football for Scottish Second Division club Brechin City, whom he joined on loan from January to June 2008; he joined up with the Glebe Park club for a short second loan spell in September 2008, but did not make any competitive appearances.

Paton made his debut for Aberdeen during December 2008, coming on as a substitute in a 3–0 win over Inverness Caledonian Thistle. He scored his first senior goal for the Dons in a 2–1 defeat to Rangers at Ibrox in May 2009.

Paton was a regular for Aberdeen in the 2009-10 season. He scored his first brace in a 3–2 defeat to Dundee at Dens Park in the quarter-final of Scottish League Cup, after appearing as a substitute. Paton set up Lee Miller to score the only goal in the Dons' 1–0 win over Rangers at Pittodrie Stadium. The following month, he signed a three-year contract extension to keep him at the club until May 2013. In the 2010 January transfer window, he was linked with a loan move to Dundee but this didn't transpire. Paton scored his second league goal for Aberdeen versus Hibernian at Easter Road on 10 February 2010, and his first at Pittodrie three days later versus Celtic with a left-foot strike from the edge of the penalty area.

The following season, Paton's playing time was reduced due to the arrival of new striker Scott Vernon. He turned down possible loan moves to Greenock Morton and Dundee, insisting he wanted to fight for his first-team place at Aberdeen. In his first appearance of the season, Paton received a straight red card for the first time in his career for stamping on Jonny Hayes in a 2–0 defeat versus Inverness Caledonian Thistle. His three-match ban was rescinded by the Scottish FA on appeal and he was available to return for the next match. On 30 November 2010, Paton travelled to Austria for a three-day trial with Austrian Bundesliga club Fußballclub Wacker Innsbruck, with the aim of winning a short-term loan deal in the following transfer window but this wasn't concluded.

Paton was offered a free transfer by Aberdeen during the 2011 close season but opted to stay with the club. At the end of that transfer window on 31 August 2011, Paton signed for Stockport County on a six-month loan deal. His debut saw him receive a yellow card during the match in a 1–1 draw versus Telford United. Having featured in five games, Paton then scored his first goal for the club on 1 October 2011 in a 2–1 defeat versus York City. Two weeks later on 11 October 2011, he scored a brace in a 4–3 defeat to Darlington Paton would score one more goal versus Bath City and also provided an assist for Nick Chadwick in a 2–0 victory. He returned to his parent club at the end of November after sustaining an injury.

On 31 August 2012, Paton was released by Aberdeen; his release left him demoralised after he was surplus to requirements at the Pittodrie club. Meanwhile, the Dons manager at that time, Craig Brown, said that Paton's release was mainly due to his lack of scoring goals.

=== Queen of the South (First spell) ===
On 28 February 2013, Paton signed for Queen of the South until the end of that season. He had been on trial with the Doonhamers, playing on three occasions as a trialist, it was the first club he had played for in six months. On 2 March 2013, he debuted for Queens, appearing as a substitute for Paul Burns in the 71st minute in a 3–2 win over East Fife. On 27 March 2013, Paton scored his first two goals for Queen of the South in a league title-clinching 6–0 win against Brechin City. On 20 April 2013, he scored his third goal for the club in a 4–0 win versus Forfar Athletic. After helping the club win the Scottish Challenge Cup and gain promotion back to the Scottish Championship, his performances earned him a contract extension with the Doonhamers until 31 May 2014.

At the start of the 2013–14 season, Paton began well and scored the winning goal in the opening league match in a 4–3 home victory over recently relegated club Dundee, who had John Brown as their manager. On 25 August 2013, he again scored the winning goal in a 2–1 win versus St Mirren in the second round of the Scottish League Cup at Palmerston Park. On 25 September 2013, Paton scored again in the third round of Scottish League Cup versus Hearts. On 30 November 2013, he scored versus St Mirren once again, this time in the fourth round of Scottish Cup, in a 2–2 draw. The Paisley club, however, would go on to win the replay. On 21 December 2013, Paton scored his second league goal of the season in a 2–2 draw versus Livingston and his third on 11 January 2014 in a 3–1 win versus Alloa Athletic. In his first full season with the Doonhamers, Paton had 38 appearances and scored six goals in all competitions. He went on to sign an extension to his contract at the end of that season.

In his second season with the Dumfries club, Paton scored in the first round of the Scottish Challenge Cup, in a 4–3 defeat versus Livingston. However, he then suffered a hamstring injury that kept him sidelined for four months. Paton's return to the first-team was on 12 December 2014, appearing as a substitute for Iain Russell in the last few minutes of the 2–0 home win versus Rangers. Having returned to the first-team squad, mostly appearing as a substitute, he then had a goal assist for Aidan Smith in a 1–1 draw at Ibrox versus the Govan club and then on 21 March 2015 scored his first goal of that season in a 4–1 win versus Cowdenbeath. Paton's second season saw him playing on 23 occasions and scoring one goal in all competitions. With his contract expiring at the end of that season, his future with the Dumfries club looked uncertain and he decided to move on to another club.

=== Dunfermline Athletic ===
After two years with Queen of the South, Paton's new club was to be Dunfermline Athletic in the close season of 2015, being signed on a one-year deal by Allan Johnston, his former manager at Palmerston. Paton's debut for the Pars was versus Arbroath in the Scottish Challenge Cup and his first match at East End Park was in a 5–1 win over Fife derby rivals Cowdenbeath. After registering six assists, he scored his first goal for the club in September 2015, in a match versus Dundee United in the League Cup. After winning the league title versus Brechin City with five league matches remaining, Paton agreed a new one-year extension to his contract with the Pars to keep him at East End Park until summer 2017. Dunfermline manager Johnston described Paton as a "massive player" for the Scottish League One champions with Paton finishing the season as the club's best creator of goal scoring opportunities.

Paton spent a further two seasons with the club, although his time was marred by injury. His final match for Dunfermline came in a 2–1 defeat to St Mirren on 26 January 2018, when he was replaced after 63 minutes. Following the end of his contract he was released in May 2018, having made over 80 competitive appearances for the side.

=== Dumbarton ===
Following a successful trial period, Paton signed for Scottish League One club Dumbarton on 13 July 2018. He scored his first goal for the club in a 2–1 Scottish Challenge Cup victory against Greenock Morton in August 2018. After 30 appearances and two goals for the club, he was released after a single season in May 2019.

=== Queen of the South (second spell) ===
On 15 July 2019, Paton signed for the Doonhamers for a second spell after a pre-season trial period.

=== Brechin City ===
Paton signed for Brechin City in October 2020. In the following month he became their player-manager. Brechin were relegated from Scottish League Two at the end of the season, after which Paton stepped down from his role as manager but remained at the club as a player for the 2021/2022 season.

== Career statistics ==
=== Player ===
As of 25 August 2020 (UTC)

Appearances and goals by club, season and competition
Club	Season	League			Scottish Cup		League Cup		Other		Total	
Club	Season	Division	Apps	Goals	Apps	Goals	Apps	Goals	Apps	Goals	Apps	Goals
Aberdeen	2007–08	Scottish Premier League	0	0	0	0	0	0	0	0	0	0
Aberdeen	2008–09	Scottish Premier League	4	1	1	0	0	0	0	0	5	1
Aberdeen	2009–10	Scottish Premier League	35	3	2	0	1	2	1	0	39	5
Aberdeen	2010–11	Scottish Premier League	10	0	1	0	0	0	0	0	11	0
Aberdeen	2011–12	Scottish Premier League	2	0	0	0	0	0	0	0	2	0
Aberdeen	Total		51	4	4	0	1	2	1	0	57	6
Brechin City (loan)	2007–08	Scottish Division Two	16	4	1	0	0	0	0	0	17	4
Stockport County (loan)	2011–12	Conference National	15	4	0	0	0	0	0	0	15	4
Queen of the South	2012–13	Scottish Division Two	10	3	0	0	0	0	1	0	11	3
Queen of the South	2013–14	Scottish Championship	30	3	2	1	3	2	1	0	36	6
Queen of the South	2014–15	Scottish Championship	20	1	2	0	0	0	2	1	24	2
Queen of the South	Total		60	7	4	1	3	2	4	1	71	11
Dunfermline Athletic	2015–16	Scottish League One	31	2	3	0	3	1	3	0	40	3
Dunfermline Athletic	2016–17	Scottish Championship	18	1	2	1	0	0	2	0	22	2
Dunfermline Athletic	2017–18	Scottish Championship	11	1	1	0	5	1	2	0	19	2
Dunfermline Athletic	Total		60	4	6	1	8	2	7	0	81	7
Dumbarton	2018–19	Scottish League One	24	1	1	0	4	0	1	1	30	2
Queen of the South	2019-20	Scottish Championship	22	1	1	0	3	1	1	0	27	2
Career total			248	25	17	2	19	7	14	2	298	36

== Managerial record ==
As of match played 23 May 2021

Managerial record by team and tenure
Team	From	To	Record				
Team	From	To	P	W	D	L	Win %
Brechin City	October 2020	May 2021	24	2	4	18	8.3

- statistics including games as caretaker.

== Honours ==
Queen of the South

- Scottish Challenge Cup: 2012–13

Dunfermline Athletic

- Scottish League One: 2015–16
