= Mark Durnan =

Scottish footballer (born 1992)

Personal information
- Date of birth: 28 November 1992 (age 33)
- Place of birth: Glasgow, Scotland
- Position: Defender

Team information
- Current team: Johnstone Burgh

Youth career
- 2006–2008: Clyde
- 2008–2010: St Johnstone

Senior career*
Years	Team	Apps	(Gls)
2010–2012	St Johnstone	0	(0)
2010–2011	→ Arbroath (loan)	9	(1)
2011	→ Stranraer (loan)	4	(0)
2012	→ Elgin City (loan)	17	(2)
2012–2015	Queen of the South	90	(14)
2015–2018	Dundee United	87	(8)
2018–2019	Dunfermline Athletic	13	(0)
2019–2021	Falkirk	34	(3)
2021–2023	Alloa Athletic	50	(4)
2023–2026	Dumbarton	79	(9)
2026–	Johnstone Burgh		
- * Club domestic league appearances and goals as of 19:30, 2 May 2026 (UTC)

Mark Durnan (born 28 November 1992) is a Scottish professional footballer whoplays as a defender for Johnstone Burgh.

He has previously played for St Johnstone, Queen of the South, Dundee United, Dunfermline Athletic, Falkirk, Alloa Athletic and Dumbarton, as well as Arbroath, Stranraer and Elgin City on loan.

== Career ==
=== Early career ===
Durnan started his career in the youth system at Clyde before moving to St Johnstone in 2008 but in his time at the Perth club, he failed to have a first-team appearance. Whilst at the Saints, Durnan went out on loan to various clubs. In August 2010, he moved out on loan to Arbroath. On 23 August 2011, Durnan was loaned out to Stranraer for one month and on 11 January 2012, he was loaned out to Elgin City for the remainder of that season.

=== Queen of the South ===
On 25 July 2012, Durnan signed for Dumfries club Queen of the South, signing a one-year contract. In his first season at the club Queens won the 2012–13 Scottish Second Division title and the Scottish Challenge Cup. On 19 April 2013, he signed a new one-year contract with the Doonhamers. At the end of that season, Durnan was one of six Queens players named in the PFA Scotland 2012–13 Second Division Team of the Year. On 7 January 2014, he extended his contract with the Dumfries club.

=== Dundee United ===
In June 2015, Durnan signed a three-year contract with Dundee United. He scored his first goal for the club on 23 January 2016 in a 5–1 win over Kilmarnock. Durnan spent three seasons at Tannadice, before being released by the Terrors in May 2018.

=== Dunfermline ===
After leaving the Arabs, Durnan signed for Dunfermline Athletic during the 2018 close season and was released in May 2019 after only one season with the Pars.

=== Falkirk ===
On 21 June 2019, Durnan signed a two-year contract with Scottish League One club Falkirk.

=== Alloa Athletic ===
Durnan signed for Alloa Athletic in June 2021.

=== Dumbarton ===
After two seasons with the club he joined Scottish League Two side Dumbarton in May 2023 and was named club captain. He extended his deal with the club until the summer of 2025 in January 2024. In his first season with the club, he captained them to promotion via the playoffs. After three seasons and 104 appearances, Durnan left the Sons in May 2026.

=== Later career ===
In June 2026 he signed for Johnstone Burgh.

== Career statistics ==
As of 19:30, 2 May 2026 (UTC)

Appearances and goals by club, season and competition
Club	Season	League			Scottish Cup		League Cup		Other		Total	
Club	Season	Division	Apps	Goals	Apps	Goals	Apps	Goals	Apps	Goals	Apps	Goals
St Johnstone	2010–11	Scottish Premier League	0	0	0	0	0	0	—		0	0
St Johnstone	2011–12	Scottish Premier League	0	0	0	0	0	0	—		0	0
St Johnstone	Total		0	0	0	0	0	0	0	0	0	0
Arbroath (loan)	2010–11	Scottish Third Division	9	1	0	0	0	0	0	0	9	1
Stranraer (loan)	2011–12	Scottish Third Division	4	0	0	0	0	0	0	0	4	0
Elgin City (loan)	2011–12	Scottish Third Division	17	2	0	0	0	0	2 (Note: Appearances in the Second Division play-offs)	0	19	2
Queen of the South	2012–13	Scottish Second Division	32	6	1	0	3	0	3 (Note: Appearances in the Scottish Challenge Cup)	1	39	7
Queen of the South	2013–14	Scottish Championship	28	5	3	0	1	0	2 (Note: Appearances in the Premiership play-offs)	0	34	5
Queen of the South	2014–15	Scottish Championship	30	3	3	0	2	0	3 (Note: One appearance in the Scottish Challenge Cup and two in the Premiership play-offs)	0	38	3
Queen of the South	Total		90	14	7	0	6	0	8	1	111	15
Dundee United	2015–16	Scottish Premiership	28	2	3	0	2	0	—		33	2
Dundee United	2016–17	Scottish Championship	32	4	1	0	4	0	9 (Note: Three appearances and a goal in the Scottish Challenge Cup; six appearances in the Premiership play-offs)	1	46	5
Dundee United	2017–18	Scottish Championship	27	2	2	1	4	1	3 (Note: Three appearances in the Premiership play-offs)	0	14	2
Dundee United	Total		87	8	6	1	10	1	12	1	115	11
Dunfermline Athletic	2018–19	Scottish Championship	13	0	1	0	5	0	1	0	20	0
Falkirk	2019–20	Scottish League One	22	2	4	0	3	0	1	0	30	2
Falkirk	2020–21	Scottish League One	12	1	0	0	3	0	0	0	15	1
Falkirk	Total		34	3	4	0	6	0	1	0	45	3
Alloa Athletic	2021–22	Scottish League One	33	4	1	0	0	0	1	0	35	4
Alloa Athletic	2022–23	Scottish League One	17	0	0	0	0	0	1	0	18	0
Alloa Athletic	Total		50	4	1	0	0	0	2	0	53	4
Dumbarton	2023–24	Scottish League Two	19	0	0	0	4	0	6	0	29	0
Dumbarton	2024–25	Scottish League One	31	5	2	0	3	0	0	0	36	5
Dumbarton	2025–26	Scottish League Two	29	4	1	0	3	0	6	0	39	4
Dumbarton	Total		79	9	3	0	10	0	12	0	104	9
Career total			383	41	22	1	37	1	38	2	480	45

== Honours ==
Queen of the South

- Scottish Challenge Cup: 2012–13

Dundee United

- Scottish Challenge Cup: 2016-17
