= Kevin Dzierzawski =

American soccer player

Personal information
- Full name: Randy Kevin Dzierzawski, Jr.
- Date of birth: June 28, 1991 (age 35)
- Height: 5 ft 10 in (1.78 m)
- Position: Midfielder

Youth career
- 2009–2012: Dartmouth Big Green

Senior career*
Years	Team	Apps	(Gls)
2013–2015	Queen of the South	30	(0)
2015	→ Peterhead (loan)	17	(1)
2015–2017	Peterhead	51	(3)
- * Club domestic league appearances and goals as of 14:52, 8 June 2017 (UTC)

Randy Kevin Dzierzawski Jr. (born June 28, 1991) is an American professional soccer player who plays as a midfielder.

== Career ==
Dzierzawski played college soccer for the Dartmouth Big Green, before beginning his professional career in Scotland with Queen of the South. He made his professional debut in the Scottish Championship on September 14, 2013, as a 66th-minute substitute for Derek Young in a 0–1 loss to Raith Rovers at Palmerston Park.

Dzierzawksi was loaned out to Peterhead on January 22, 2015, for the rest of the Scottish League One season. He made his debut nine days later, playing the full 90 minutes and scoring in a 2–0 win over Stenhousemuir at the Balmoor Stadium.

On May 28, 2015, he transferred to Peterhead, on the basis that he was unlikely to retain a work permit if he were to remain at Queen of the South.

During his first season with Peterhead, where Dzierzawski made 42 appearances, the club finished in 3rd place qualifying for the Scottish Championship playoff as well as leading the club to its first ever Cup final against Rangers at Hampden Park. He was released at the end of the 2016–17 season following the club's relegation to Scottish League Two.
