= Dan Carmichael =

Scottish footballer (born 1990)

Personal information
- Full name: Daniel Carmichael
- Date of birth: 21 June 1990 (age 36)
- Place of birth: Dumfries, Scotland
- Height: 5 ft 7 in (1.70 m)
- Position: Midfielder

Team information
- Current team: Annan Athletic

Youth career
- Queen of the South
- 2006–2008: Workington

Senior career*
Years	Team	Apps	(Gls)
2007–2008	Workington		
2008–2010	Gretna 2008		
2010–2015	Queen of the South	155	(12)
2015–2016	Hibernian	6	(1)
2016–2018	Queen of the South	26	(0)
2018–2019	Cumnock Juniors		
2019	Workington		
2019–2020	East Kilbride		
2020	Gretna 2008		
2020–2022	Threave Rovers		
2022–2024	Gretna 2008		
2024	Dalbeattie Star		
- * Club domestic league appearances and goals as of 17:48, 18 March 2024 (UTC)

Daniel Carmichael (born 21 June 1990) is a Scottish professional footballer, who plays for Annan Athletic as a midfielder.

Carmichael has played previously for Queen of the South in two spells, Hibernian, Cumnock Juniors, Workington, East Kilbride, Gretna in three spells, Threave Rovers and Dalbeattie Star.

== Career ==
=== Early career ===
After playing as a youth with home-town club Queen of the South, Carmichael joined Workington whilst the club ran a Football Development Centre in tandem with the University of Central Lancashire. Carmichael debuted for the first-team for the Cumbrian club in a Conference North match versus Worcester City in January 2007.

Workington reserve team manager, Stuart Rome, left the club in 2008 to take charge of the newly formed Gretna 2008, with Carmichael following him to the East of Scotland Football League club. As well as featuring for the East of Scotland Select team whilst at Gretna, Carmichael was also called into the England Colleges squad.

=== Queen of the South (first spell) ===
It was announced on 30 April 2010 that Carmichael would sign for Queen of the South on a two-year contract. This would take effect after the last game of Gretna's season on 13 May 2010. Carmichael's league debut for Queens was the season opening 1–0 defeat away to Dundee. Carmichael's first league goal for the Doonhamers arrived in the home defeat the week after versus Raith Rovers. Carmichael was named in the Second Division team of the year for 2012–13 by PFA Scotland, as he helped Queens win promotion and the 2012–13 Scottish Challenge Cup.

In announcing his departure from the club on 2 June 2015, Carmichael had started 142 first-team matches and had 54 substitute appearances, scoring 15 goals.

=== Hibernian ===
On 2 June 2015, Carmichael signed a two-year deal with Hibernian. Carmichael's appearances were restricted during the early part of the 2015–16 season due to an abdominal injury. Carmichael departed Easter Road by mutual consent in August 2016, having made nine appearances in total for the club.

=== Queen of the South (second spell) ===
After leaving Hibernian, Carmichael was signed once again for Queens, until the end of the 2016–17 season.

On 18 May 2017, Carmichael signed a new one-year contract with Queens.

Carmichael's appearances were thwarted by injury problems during his second spell at Palmerston and he was released by the Dumfries club at the end of the 2017-18 season.

=== Cumnock Juniors ===
In August 2018, Carmichael joined Junior club Cumnock Juniors after a successful trial period.

=== Workington ===
On 30 January 2019, Carmichael signed for Workington until 31 May 2019, where he played on four occasions for the first-team.

=== East Kilbride ===
During the 2019 close season, Carmichael signed for East Kilbride.

=== Gretna 2008 ===
Carmichael returned to Gretna 2008 for a second spell in 2020.

=== Further spells with Gretna 2008 ===
In June 2022, Carmichael returned to Gretna 2008 for a third spell following a two-year spell with Threave Rovers.

On 19 January 2024, Carmichael returned for a fourth spell with Gretna, departing the club less than two months later.

== Career statistics ==
As of 29 April 2018

Club	Season	League			Scottish Cup		League Cup		Challenge Cup		Total	
Club	Season	Division	Apps	Goals	Apps	Goals	Apps	Goals	Apps	Goals	Apps	Goals
Queen of the South	2010–11	Scottish First Division	28	3	1	0	2	1	0	0	31	4
Queen of the South	2011–12	Scottish First Division	34	4	3	1	3	1	1	0	41	6
Queen of the South	2012–13	Scottish Second Division	34	3	1	0	2	0	3	0	40	3
Queen of the South	2013–14	Scottish Championship	26	1	2	0	2	0	3	0	33	1
Queen of the South	2014–15	Scottish Championship	33	1	3	0	2	0	1	0	39	1
Queen of the South	Total		155	12	10	1	11	2	8	0	184	15
Hibernian	2015–16	Scottish Championship	6	1	1	0	2	0	0	0	9	1
Total		Scottish Championship	6	1	1	0	2	0	0	0	9	1
Queen of the South	2016–17	Scottish Championship	19	0	1	0	0	0	1	0	21	0
Queen of the South	2017-18	Scottish Championship	7	0	0	0	1	0	1	0	9	0
Queen of the South	Career totals		187	13	12	1	14	2	10	0	223	16

== Honours ==
Queen of the South

- Scottish Second Division: 2012–13
- Scottish Challenge Cup: 2012–13

Winning the league with eh star
