= Chris Mitchell (Scottish footballer) =

Scottish footballer

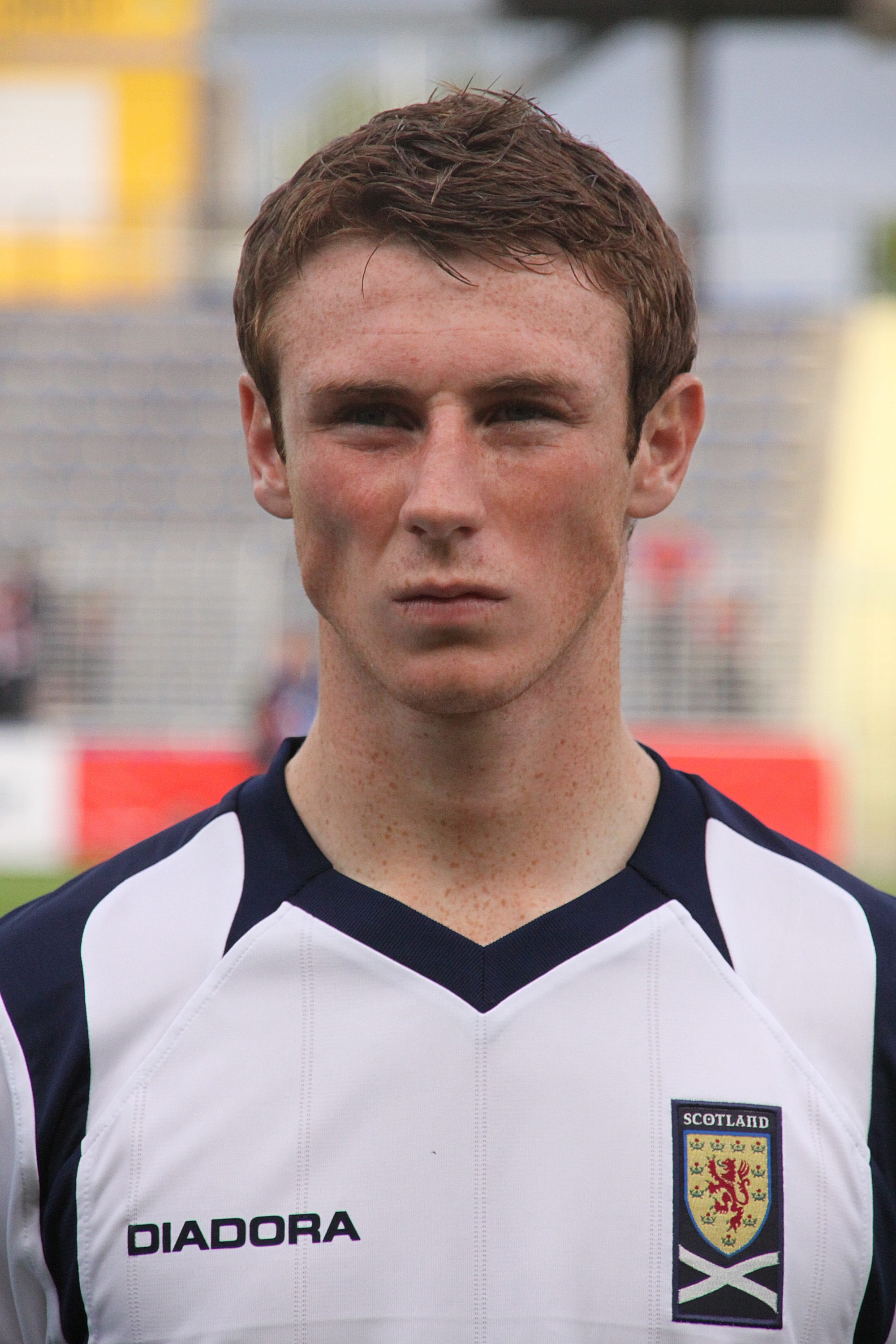
- Mitchell with Scotland U21 in 2009

Personal information
- Full name: Christopher Philip Mitchell
- Date of birth: 21 July 1988
- Place of birth: Stirling, Scotland
- Date of death: 7 May 2016 (aged 27)
- Place of death: Cornton, Stirling, Scotland
- Height: 1.75 m (5 ft 9 in)
- Positions: Defender; midfielder

Youth career
- Livingston
- 2006–2007: Falkirk

Senior career*
Years	Team	Apps	(Gls)
2007–2011	Falkirk	39	(1)
2010	→ Ayr United (loan)	10	(1)
2011–2012	Bradford City	11	(1)
2012–2015	Queen of the South	65	(2)
2015–2016	Clyde	15	(0)
Total		140	(5)

International career
2008–2009	Scotland U21	7	(0)
- * Club domestic league appearances and goals

Christopher Philip Mitchell (21 July 1988 – 7 May 2016) was a Scottish professional footballer who played as a defender or midfielder.

Mitchell began his senior career at Scottish Premier League club Falkirk, who also loaned him to Ayr United. He then had a season in England with Bradford City, before joining Queen of the South in 2012. In his first season at Queen of the South he won the Scottish Challenge Cup and SFL Second Division; and was named in the division's PFA Scotland Team of the Year.

After complications from spinal surgery disrupted his third season at Queen of the South, he joined Clyde on a one-year deal in 2015; before leaving in February 2016 to establish a new career. Mitchell suffered from depression after his halted football career, and committed suicide at the age of 27.

== Football career ==
=== Falkirk ===
Stirling-born Mitchell was in the youth system at Livingston, before moving to Falkirk's equivalent system. At Falkirk, he was promoted to the first team. In a pre-season game in 2007, he scored the winning goal against Dutch team Ajax. He made his competitive debut on 22 December 2007 as an added-time substitute in a 3–0 Scottish Premier League victory at Motherwell. He finished his first season with five appearances, the last three of which were starts. On 21 November 2009 he scored his only competitive goal for Falkirk; a 20-yard free kick in a 2–0 home win against Hamilton Academical.

Mitchell moved to Ayr United on loan on 22 January 2010 for the rest of the season. He made ten appearances for the club in the Scottish Football League First Division, scoring the opening goal of a 1–1 draw at Raith Rovers on 27 March again from another free kick, this time from 30 yards.

During his time at Falkirk, Mitchell won seven caps for the Scotland national under-21 football team. The first was on 20 May 2008 in a 4–1 friendly loss to Norway at Rugby Park in Kilmarnock.

=== Bradford City ===
Mitchell signed for Bradford City on 1 July 2011 on a one-year deal along with Falkirk teammate Mark Stewart. He made his debut against Aldershot Town at Valley Parade on 6 August. He played the full 90 minutes in this 1–2 loss on the opening day of the Football League Two season. On 27 August Mitchell provided three assists during a 4–2 home win against Barnet.

On 8 November he scored the winning spot-kick as the Bantams defeated Yorkshire neighbours Sheffield United 6–5 in a penalty shootout. This was in the quarter-finals of the Football League Trophy. On 19 November Mitchell scored his first goal for the club in a home game Yorkshire neighbours Rotherham United. Despite Mitchell's headed equaliser his side lost 2–3. On 28 April 2012 Bradford announced that he would leave the club with his contract ended by mutual consent. Michael Flynn and Craig Fagan were also included in the announcement.

=== Queen of the South ===
On 26 July 2012 Mitchell returned to Scotland initially on a one-year contract. He signed for newly relegated Scottish Football League Second Division team Queen of the South. He scored nine minutes into his debut for the Doonhamers. This goal on 4 August opened a 5–2 win over Alloa Athletic in the first round of the Scottish League Cup.

On 7 April 2013 Mitchell played in the Scottish Challenge Cup final at the Almondvale Stadium in Livingston. He played the full 120 minutes of the 1–1 draw against Partick Thistle. Mitchell scored with his side's penultimate kick in a penalty shootout they won 6–5. In his first season in Dumfries he played in 33 league games of a title winning campaign. He scored twice in that campaign – both against Stenhousemuir. QoS had six players including Mitchell named in the division's PFA Scotland Team of the Year.

Next season back in the second tier Queens finished fourth making the playoffs.

Injury disrupted Mitchell's third and final season at Palmerston Park.

=== Clyde ===
On 11 May 2015 Mitchell agreed to join Clyde of Scottish League Two on a one-year deal. The 4–2 win over Elgin City at the Broadwood Stadium on 14 November 2015 was Mitchell's only career dismissal.

He left Clyde in February 2016 in order to focus on a new job.

== Death ==
Complications from surgery for spinal injury caused Mitchell to go from playing professionally for Queen of the South to part-time for Clyde while working in a factory. He eventually left the sport to train as a salesman for his uncle's company, but during his training he confessed that he was depressed and his family took him to see a psychologist; he was placed on medication but stopped taking it due to side effects.

On 7 May 2016, while his partner Louise Rooney was in London, Mitchell went to a level crossing in Cornton near his home in Stirling and telephoned her to say that he was intending to kill himself. The call was still live when he was fatally struck by the train.

=== Reaction ===
On 10 May, Clyde paid tribute to Mitchell in their play-off game against Queen's Park. Falkirk did the same against Hibernian four days later.

Clyde, Falkirk, Queen of the South and Bradford joined with Mitchell's family to make a charitable foundation in his name, to help former professionals make the transition into new jobs.

== Honours ==
Queen of the South

- Scottish Challenge Cup: 2012–13
