= Kevin Smith (footballer, born 1987) =

Scottish footballer

Personal information
- Full name: Kevin James Smith
- Date of birth: 20 March 1987 (age 39)
- Place of birth: Edinburgh, Scotland
- Height: 1.80 m (5 ft 11 in)
- Position: Forward

Team information
- Current team: Bonnyrigg Rose (assistant manager)

Senior career*
Years	Team	Apps	(Gls)
2005–2006	Leeds United	0	(0)
2006–2007	Sunderland	0	(0)
2006–2007	→ Wrexham (loan)	8	(2)
2007	→ Dundee (loan)	8	(0)
2008–2010	Dundee United	1	(0)
2008	→ Raith Rovers (loan)	18	(12)
2009	→ Raith Rovers (loan)	11	(6)
2009–2010	→ Raith Rovers (loan)	9	(2)
2010–2011	Notts County	11	(2)
2011–2013	Queen of the South	35	(7)
2013–2014	Dumbarton	10	(0)
2014	→ East Fife (loan)	15	(0)
2014–2022	East Fife	141	(35)
2022–2023	Bonnyrigg Rose Athletic	24	(6)
2023–2024	Cowdenbeath	3	(0)

Managerial career
- 2023–2024: Cowdenbeath (assistant)
- 2024–: Bonnyrigg Rose (assistant)
- * Club domestic league appearances and goals

Kevin James Smith (born 20 March 1987) is a Scottish professional football coach and a former forward who works as assistant manager at Bonnyrigg Rose. He has previously played for Leeds United, Sunderland, Dundee United, Notts County, Queen of the South, Dumbarton, East Fife and Bonnyrigg Rose Athletic, and has also appeared for Wrexham, Dundee, Raith Rovers on loan and Cowdenbeath as player/assistant manager.

== Background ==
Born in Edinburgh, Kevin Smith attended Musselburgh Grammar School. He was selected for the Lothian Schools XI in 2002.

== Career ==
Smith began his career with Leeds United, but was allowed to leave and signed for Sunderland in January 2006. He had loan spells with Wrexham and Dundee but could not break into Sunderland's first team and was released in June 2007 after eighteen months at the club.

After a lengthy period without a club, Smith began training with Dundee United in April 2008. He appeared as an unused substitute in the final two matches of the season and subsequently signed a one-year contract.

In July 2008, six days after appearing against them in a friendly, Smith undertook a five-month loan spell with Raith Rovers, scoring in his second match for the club. Smith was recalled from his loan spell in January 2009 after scoring 12 goals in 17 appearances for Raith; however, on 23 January 2009 he was allowed to return to the Kirkcaldy club until the end of the season. In April 2009, after helping Raith to top of the table with three games remaining, Smith suffered a broken leg and dislocated ankle, ruling him out for six months. Following his recovery from this injury he was loaned to Raith for a third time as he sought to recover his match fitness. He helped Rovers to that season's Scottish Second Division Championship.

He then moved to League One Notts County after signing a one-year deal on 2 August 2010.

It was announced on 25 June 2011, along with ex-Raith colleague Mark Campbell, that he had agreed terms but not yet signed for Dumfries club Queen of the South. His Queens debut was on 23 July 2011 the extra time 2–0 defeat away at Ayr United in the 2011–12 Scottish Challenge Cup.

== Career statistics ==
As of match played on 19 March 2019.

Appearances and goals by club, season and competition
Club	Season	League			Cup		League Cup		Other		Total		Ref.
Club	Season	Division	Apps	Goals	Apps	Goals	Apps	Goals	Apps	Goals	Apps	Goals	Ref.
Leeds United	2005–06	Championship	0	0	0	0	0	0	—		0	0	
Sunderland	2005–06	Premier League	0	0	0	0	0	0	—		0	0	
Sunderland	2006–07	Championship	0	0	0	0	0	0	—		0	0	
Sunderland	Total		0	0	0	0	0	0	—		0	0	—
Wrexham	2006–07	League Two	8	1	2	1	0	0	—		10	2	
Dundee	2006–07	Scottish First Division	8	0	0	0	0	0	—		8	0	
Dundee United	2007–08	Scottish Premier League	0	0	0	0	0	0	—		0	0	
Dundee United	2008–09	Scottish Premier League	0	0	0	0	0	0	—		0	0	
Dundee United	2009–10	Scottish Premier League	3	0	0	0	0	0	—		3	0	
Dundee United	Total		3	0	0	0	0	0	—		3	0	—
Raith Rovers (loan)	2008–09	Scottish Second Division	28	18	0	0	0	0	—		28	18	
Raith Rovers (loan)	2009–10	Scottish First Division	5	2	6	2	0	0	—		11	4	
Raith Rovers (loan)	Total		33	20	6	2	0	0	—		39	22	—
Notts County	2010–11	League One	13	1	0	0	3	2	1 (Note: Appearance in the EFL Trophy.)	0	17	3	
Queen of the South	2011–12	Scottish Championship	23	5	0	0	2	0	1 (Note: Appearances in the Scottish Challenge Cup.)	0	26	5	
Queen of the South	2012–13	League One	18	2	0	0	0	0	1	0	19	2	
Queen of the South	Total		41	7	0	0	2	0	2	0	45	7	—
Dumbarton	2013–14	Scottish Championship	10	0	1	0	2	1	1	1	14	2	
East Fife	2013–14	Scottish League One	15	0	0	0	0	0	4 (Note: Appearances in the Scottish League One Relegation Playoff.)	1	19	1	
East Fife	2014–15	Scottish League Two	26	11	2	0	1	0	4 (Note: Appearances in the Scottish Challenge Cup and Scottish League Two Promotion Playoff.)	0	33	11	
East Fife	2015–16	Scottish League Two	26	6	1	0	1	0	1	0	29	6	
East Fife	2016–17	Scottish League One	29	7	4	0	4	2	1	1	38	10	
East Fife	2017–18	Scottish League One	21	1	2	1	0	0	—		23	2	
East Fife	2018–19	Scottish League One	26	7	1	0	4	0	3	1	34	8	
East Fife	Total		143	32	10	1	10	2	13	3	176	38	—
Career total			253	59	19	4	17	5	17	3	306	71	—

== Honours ==
Raith Rovers

- Scottish Second Division: 1

2008–09

Queen of the South

- Scottish Second Division: 1

2012–13

- Scottish Challenge Cup: 1

2012–13
