= 2011–12 Queen of the South F.C. season =

Queen of the South
2011–12 season
- Chairman: Davie Rae
- Manager: Gus MacPherson; Allan Johnston
- Stadium: Palmerston Park
- First Division: 10th (Relegated)
- Challenge Cup: First round
- League Cup: Third round
- Scottish Cup: Fifth round replay
- Top goalscorer: League: Scott McLaughlin (6); Sam Parkin (6); All: Scott McLaughlin (7)
- Highest home attendance: 2,079 vs. Ayr United, 31 March 2012
- Lowest home attendance: 1,282 vs. Hamilton Academical, 2 January 2012
- Average home league attendance: 1,551
Home colours	Away colours

The 2011–12 season was Queen of the South's tenth consecutive season in the Scottish First Division, having been promoted from the Scottish Second Division at the end of the 2001–02 season. Queens also competed in the Challenge Cup, League Cup and the Scottish Cup.

== Summary ==
Queen of the South finished tenth in the First Division and were relegated to the Second Division. They reached the first round of the Challenge Cup, the third round of the League Cup and the fifth round of the Scottish Cup.

=== Management ===
The club began the 2011–12 season under the management of Gus MacPherson. On 30 April 2012, MacPherson resigned after relegation was confirmed. On 3 May, Allan Johnston was appointed as manager.

== Results and fixtures ==
Win Draw Loss Abandoned or Postponed

=== Preseason ===
5 July 2011 Friendly	Gretna 2008	1–5	Queen of the South	Raydale Park
	Sloan	QOSFC Report	Carmichael; McGuffie; Brighton; A. Trialist; B. Trialist	Attendance: 509

7 July 2011 Friendly	Queen's Park	2 – 2	Queen of the South	Hampden Park
		QOSFC Report		Attendance: Closed doors

12 July 2011 Friendly	Clyde	1 – 3	Queen of the South	Broadwood Stadium
				Attendance: Closed doors

14 July 2011 Friendly	Alloa Athletic	3 – 0	Queen of the South	Recreation Park
	A. Trialist; Holmes	Alloa FC Report		Attendance: Closed doors

16 July 2011 Friendly	Annan Athletic	0 – 1	Queen of the South	East Kilbride
		QOSFC Report	Carmichael	Attendance: Closed doors

=== Scottish First Division ===
6 August 2011 First Division	Livingston	2 – 2	Queen of the South	Braidwood Motor Company Stadium
	Sinclair 56'; Russell 85' (pen.)	BBC Sport	McLaughlin 19'; Brighton 32'; C Reid (red card) 84'	Attendance: 1,444; Referee: Euan Norris

13 August 2011 First Division	Queen of the South	1 – 3	Raith Rovers	Palmerston Park
	Smith 45' (pen.), (red card) 87'	BBC Sport	Baird 67', 77'; Graham 88'	Attendance: 1,602; Referee: Alan Muir

20 August 2011 First Division	Ross County	2 – 0	Queen of the South	Victoria Park
	Kettlewell (red card) 70'; Craig 87', 90'	BBC Sport		Attendance: 2,065; Referee: Steve Conroy

27 August 2011 First Division	Partick Thistle	2 – 1	Queen of the South	Firhill Stadium
	Doolan 20'; Elliott 85'	BBC Sport	Campbell 61'	Attendance: 2,045; Referee: John McKendrick

10 September 2011 First Division	Queen of the South	1 – 0	Hamilton Academical	Palmerston Park
	Johnston 51'	BBC Sport		Attendance: 1,514; Referee: Charlie Richmond

17 September 2011 First Division	Queen of the South	4 – 1	Greenock Morton	Palmerston Park
	Smith 20', 35', 38'; Brighton 30'	BBC Sport	MacDonald 87'	Attendance: 1,699; Referee: George Salmond

24 September 2011 First Division	Ayr United	1 – 0	Queen of the South	Somerset Park
	Roberts 84'	BBC Sport		Attendance: 1,582; Referee: Calum Murray

1 October 2011 First Division	Queen of the South	0 – 0	Dundee	Palmerston Park
		BBC Sport		Attendance: 1,649; Referee: Mike Tumilty

15 October 2011 First Division	Falkirk	1 – 0	Queen of the South	Falkirk Stadium
	Dods 90'	QOSFC Report		Attendance: 3,094; Referee: John Beaton

22 October 2011 First Division	Raith Rovers	0 – 2	Queen of the South	Stark's Park
		BBC Sport	McLaughlin 18'; Brighton 75'	Attendance: 1,523; Referee: Stephen Finnie

29 October 2011 First Division	Queen of the South	0 – 2	Livingston	Palmerston Park
		BBC Sport	McNulty 6'; Fotheringham 64'	Attendance: 1,556; Referee: Brian Winter

5 November 2011 First Division	Hamilton Academical	3 – 1	Queen of the South	New Douglas Park
	Paterson 17'; Imrie 82'; Anderson 90'	BBC Sport	Smith 31'	Attendance: 1,836; Referee: George Salmond

12 November 2011 First Division	Queen of the South	0 – 0	Partick Thistle	Palmerston Park
		BBC Sport		Attendance: 1,728; Referee: Calum Murray

26 November 2011 First Division	Greenock Morton	2 – 2	Queen of the South	Cappielow Park
	Jackson 17'; Weatherson 82'	BBC Sport	McLaughlin 2'; McKenna 57'	Attendance: 1,352; Referee: William Collum

3 December 2011 First Division	Queen of the South	4 – 1	Ayr United	Palmerston Park
	McKenna 31'; McLaughlin 71' (pen.); Carmichael 72'; Simmons 89'	BBC Sport	Wardlaw 45'; Malone (red card) 70'	Attendance: 1,478; Referee: Steven McLean

10 December 2011 First Division	Dundee	2 – 1	Queen of the South	Dens Park
	Hyde 8'; Riley 25'; Riley (yellow card) 56' (yellow-red card)	BBC Sport	Holt (yellow card) 27' (yellow-red card); Higgins 55'	Attendance: 5,019; Referee: Charlie Richmond

17 December 2011 First Division	Queen of the South	1 – 5	Falkirk	Palmerston Park
	McLaughlin 34'	BBC Sport	Sibbald 43', 77'; El Alagui 73', 86'; Higginbotham 81'	Attendance: 1,466; Referee: Brian Colvin

26 December 2011 First Division	Partick Thistle	1 – 0	Queen of the South	Firhill Stadium
	Doolan 48'	BBC Sport		Attendance: 2,261; Referee: Bobby Madden

2 January 2012 First Division	Queen of the South	1 – 2	Hamilton Academical	Palmerston Park
	McGuffie 82'	BBC Sport	Imrie 5', 15'; McLaughlin (yellow card) 71' (yellow-red card)	Attendance: 1,282; Referee: Gary Hilland

14 January 2012 First Division	Queen of the South	0 – 0	Ross County	Palmerston Park
		BBC Sport		Attendance: 1,314; Referee: Iain Brines

21 January 2012 First Division	Livingston	2 – 2	Queen of the South	Braidwood Motor Company Stadium
	Fox 40'; Scougall 73'	SFL Report	Brighton 16'; McGuffie 81' (pen.); C. Reid (yellow card) 90' (yellow-red card)	Attendance: 1,286; Referee: David Somers

28 January 2012 First Division	Queen of the South	2 – 1	Greenock Morton	Palmerston Park
	Parkin 58', 65'	BBC Sport	Campbell 75'	Attendance: 1,444; Referee: Craig Charleston

11 February 2012 First Division	Ayr United	1 – 1	Queen of the South	Somerset Park
	Moffat 85'	QOSFC Report	McLaughlin 76'	Attendance: 1,475; Referee: Kevin Clancy

18 February 2012 First Division	Queen of the South	1 – 1	Dundee	Palmerston Park
	Parkin 44'	BBC Sport	Lockwood 89'	Attendance: 1,682; Referee: Steve Conroy

25 February 2012 First Division	Falkirk	3 – 0	Queen of the South	Falkirk Stadium
	El Alagui 35'; Gibson 36'; Dods 79'	BBC Sport		Attendance: 2,982; Referee: Stephen Finnie

3 March 2012 First Division	Ross County	2 – 1	Queen of the South	Victoria Park
	Vigurs 23'; Gardyne 72'	BBC Sport	McGuffie 57'	Attendance: 2,578; Referee: Stevie O'Reilly

10 March 2012 First Division	Queen of the South	1 – 0	Raith Rovers	Palmerston Park
	Reilly 82'	BBC Sport		Attendance: 1,561; Referee: Brian Winter

17 March 2012 First Division	Queen of the South	0 – 5	Partick Thistle	Palmerston Park
		BBC Sport	Doolan 17', 64'; O'Donnell 42'; Erskine 69'; Elliott 85'	Attendance: 1,689; Referee: George Salmond

24 March 2012 First Division	Hamilton Academical	3 – 0	Queen of the South	New Douglas Park
	Spence 72'; Redmond 84'; Ryan 90'	BBC Sport		Attendance: 1,631; Referee: Euan Norris

31 March 2012 First Division	Queen of the South	2 – 1	Ayr United	Palmerston Park
	Johnston 14'; Parkin 24'	BBC Sport	Moffat 78'	Attendance: 2,079; Referee: Charlie Richmond

7 April 2012 First Division	Greenock Morton	2 – 2	Queen of the South	Cappielow Park
	Bachirou 32'; MacDonald 62'	SFL Report	Parkin 60'; Carmichael 79'	Attendance: 1,622; Referee: Crawford Allan

10 April 2012 First Division	Dundee	1 – 1	Queen of the South	Dens Park
	O'Donnell 53'	QOSFC Report	Higgins 82'	Attendance: 3,371; Referee: John Beaton

14 April 2012 First Division	Queen of the South	0 – 0	Falkirk	Palmerston Park
		BBC Sport		Attendance: 1,446; Referee: Iain Brines

21 April 2012 First Division	Queen of the South	0 – 4	Livingston	Palmerston Park
	Higgins (red card) 35'	BBC Sport	Boulding 27', 88'; McNulty 38'; Jacobs 72'	Attendance: 1,403; Referee: Alan Muir

28 April 2012 First Division	Raith Rovers	3 – 1	Queen of the South	Stark's Park
	Graham 15'; Baird 54'; Clarke 90'	BBC Sport	Carmichael 58'	Attendance: 2,400; Referee: Brian Colvin

5 May 2012 First Division	Queen of the South	3 – 5	Ross County	Palmerston Park
	Carmichael 10'; Parkin 15'; Reilly 53'	BBC Sport	Kettlewell 11'; Gardyne 39', 77'; McMenamin 57'; Byrne 90'	Attendance: 1,323; Referee: David Somers

=== Scottish League Cup ===
30 July 2011 Round 1	Queen of the South	2 – 1	Stranraer	Palmerston Park
	Carmichael 19'; Brighton 78'	BBC Sport	Gallagher 15'	Attendance: 1,511; Referee: Stevie O'Reilly

23 August 2011 Round 2	Queen of the South	3 – 0	Forfar Athletic	Palmerston Park
	Brighton 29'; Johnston 58'; Clark 61'	BBC Sport		Attendance: 1,008; Referee: Willie Collum

20 September 2011 Round 3	Kilmarnock	5 – 0	Queen of the South	Rugby Park
	Harkins 2'; Heffernan 41', 59', 70'; Hutchinson 74'	BBC Sport	Smith (red card) 33'	Attendance: 3,091; Referee: Stevie O'Reilly

=== Challenge Cup ===
23 July 2011 Round 1	Ayr United	2 – 0 (a.e.t.)	Queen of the South	Somerset Park
	Campbell 94'; Geggan 115'	BBC Sport		Attendance: 1,272; Referee: Brian Winter

=== Scottish Cup ===
7 January 2012 Round 4	Partick Thistle	0 – 1	Queen of the South	Firhill Stadium
		BBC Report	Carmichael 89'	Attendance: 2,454; Referee: Des Roache

4 February 2012 Round 5	Aberdeen	1 – 1	Queen of the South	Pittodrie Stadium
	Vernon 67'	BBC Sport	McLaughlin 54'	Attendance: 6,785; Referee: Steven McLean

14 February 2012 Round 5 replay	Queen of the South	1 – 2	Aberdeen	Palmerston Park
	McGuffie 58' (pen.)	QOSFC Report	Fyvie 21'; Considine 90'	Attendance: 3,102; Referee: Alan Muir

== Player statistics ==
=== Captains ===
No.	P	Name	Country	No. games	Notes
	MF	Stephen Simmons	(Scotland)	28	Club Captain
	MF	Stephen McKenna	(Scotland)	13	Vice Captain
	DF	Ryan McGuffie	(Scotland)	2	Vice Captain

Last updated: 5 May 2012
Source: Competitive match reports.
Competitive matches only
Matches started as captain only
Country: FIFA nationality; No.: Squad number; P: Position; Name: Player name; No. Games: Number of games started as captain.

=== Squad ===
Last updated 5 May 2012

No.	Pos	Nat	Player	Total		First Division		Scottish Cup		League Cup		Challenge Cup	
No.	Pos	Nat	Player	Apps	Goals	Apps	Goals	Apps	Goals	Apps	Goals	Apps	Goals
	GK	(Scotland) SCO	Roddy McKenzie	4	0	2+0	0	0+0	0	1+0	0	1+0	0
	GK	(England) ENG	Lee Robinson	39	0	34+0	0	3+0	0	2+0	0	0+0	0
	GK	(England) ENG	James Atkinson	0	0	0+0	0	0+0	0	0+0	0	0+0	0
	DF	(Scotland) SCO	John Potter	13	0	12+1	0	0+0	0	0+0	0	0+0	0
	DF	(Scotland) SCO	Alan Reid	36	0	24+5	0	3+0	0	2+1	0	0+1	0
	DF	(Scotland) SCO	Mark Campbell	19	1	15+0	1	0+0	0	3+0	0	1+0	0
	DF	(Scotland) SCO	Steven Black	6	0	3+3	0	0+0	0	0+0	0	0+0	0
	DF	(Scotland) SCO	Chris Higgins	39	2	31+1	2	3+0	0	3+0	0	1+0	0
	DF	(Scotland) SCO	Ryan McGuffie	36	4	26+4	3	3+0	1	1+1	0	1+0	0
	DF	(Scotland) SCO	Craig Reid	32	0	25+0	0	3+0	0	3+0	0	1+0	0
	MF	(Scotland) SCO	Scott McLaughlin	41	7	34+0	6	3+0	1	3+0	0	1+0	0
	MF	(Scotland) SCO	Daniel Carmichael	41	6	27+7	4	3+0	1	2+1	1	0+1	0
	MF	(Scotland) SCO	Allan Johnston	37	3	31+0	2	3+0	0	2+0	1	1+0	0
	MF	(Scotland) SCO	Ian McShane	5	0	1+3	0	0+0	0	0+1	0	0+0	0
	MF	(Scotland) SCO	Dan Orsi	2	0	1+1	0	0+0	0	0+0	0	0+0	0
	MF	(Scotland) SCO	Stephen Simmons	36	1	23+6	1	1+2	0	3+0	0	1+0	0
	MF	(Scotland) SCO	Nicky Clark	36	1	19+11	0	2+0	0	2+1	1	0+1	0
	MF	(Scotland) SCO	Stephen McKenna	37	2	24+6	2	2+1	0	2+1	0	1+0	0
	MF	(Scotland) SCO	Kevin Holt	19	0	13+4	0	1+1	0	0+0	0	0+0	0
	FW	(Scotland) SCO	Kevin Smith	26	5	17+6	5	0+0	0	2+0	0	1+0	0
	FW	(Scotland) SCO	Tom Brighton	26	6	16+5	4	1+0	0	2+1	2	1+0	0
	FW	(Scotland) SCO	Steven Degnan	0	0	0+0	0	0+0	0	0+0	0	0+0	0
	FW	(Scotland) SCO	Marc McCusker	7	0	0+7	0	0+0	0	0+0	0	0+0	0
	FW	(Scotland) SCO	Gavin Reilly	17	2	3+12	2	0+2	0	0+0	0	0+0	0
	FW	(Scotland) SCO	Ryan Smylie	9	0	0+8	0	0+0	0	0+1	0	0+0	0
	FW	(Scotland) SCO	Sam Parkin	17	6	15+0	6	2+0	0	0+0	0	0+0	0

=== Disciplinary record ===
Includes all competitive matches.

Last updated 5 May 2012

Nation	Position	Name	First Division		Scottish Cup		League Cup		Challenge Cup		Total	
Nation	Position	Name	Yellow card	Red card	Yellow card	Red card	Yellow card	Red card	Yellow card	Red card	Yellow card	Red card
(Scotland)	GK	Roddy McKenzie	0	0	0	0	0	0	0	0	0	0
(England)	GK	Lee Robinson	1	0	0	0	0	0	0	0	1	0
(England)	GK	James Atkinson	0	0	0	0	0	0	0	0	0	0
(Scotland)	DF	John Potter	2	0	0	0	0	0	0	0	2	0
(Scotland)	DF	Alan Reid	3	0	0	0	0	0	0	0	3	0
(Scotland)	DF	Mark Campbell	3	0	0	0	0	0	0	0	3	0
(Scotland)	DF	Steven Black	1	0	0	0	0	0	0	0	1	0
(Scotland)	DF	Chris Higgins	4	1	0	0	0	0	1	0	5	1
(Scotland)	DF	Ryan McGuffie	4	0	0	0	0	0	0	0	4	0
(Scotland)	DF	Craig Reid	3	2	0	0	0	0	0	0	3	2
(Scotland)	MF	Scott McLaughlin	3	0	0	0	1	0	0	0	4	0
(Scotland)	MF	Daniel Carmichael	3	0	0	0	1	0	0	0	4	0
(Scotland)	MF	Allan Johnston	4	0	0	0	0	0	0	0	4	0
(Scotland)	MF	Ian McShane	0	0	0	0	0	0	0	0	0	0
(Scotland)	MF	Dan Orsi	0	0	0	0	0	0	0	0	0	0
(Scotland)	MF	Stephen Simmons	9	0	0	0	0	0	1	0	10	0
(Scotland)	MF	Nicky Clark	1	0	0	0	1	0	0	0	2	0
(Scotland)	MF	Stephen McKenna	10	0	1	0	0	0	0	0	11	0
(Scotland)	MF	Kevin Holt	3	1	0	0	0	0	0	0	3	1
(Scotland)	FW	Kevin Smith	1	1	0	0	0	1	0	0	1	2
(Scotland)	FW	Tom Brighton	2	0	0	0	0	0	0	0	2	0
(Scotland)	FW	Steven Degnan	0	0	0	0	0	0	0	0	0	0
(Scotland)	FW	Marc McCusker	0	0	0	0	0	0	0	0	0	0
(Scotland)	FW	Gavin Reilly	0	0	0	0	0	0	0	0	0	0
(Scotland)	FW	Ryan Smylie	0	0	0	0	0	0	0	0	0	0
(Scotland)	FW	Sam Parkin	4	0	0	0	0	0	0	0	4	0

=== Top scorers ===
Last updated on 5 May 2012

Position	Nation	Name	First Division	Scottish Cup	League Cup	Challenge Cup	Total
1	(Scotland)	Scott McLaughlin	6	1	0	0	7
2	(Scotland)	Tom Brighton	4	0	2	0	6
=	(Scotland)	Sam Parkin	6	0	0	0	6
=	(Scotland)	Daniel Carmichael	4	1	1	0	6
5	(Scotland)	Kevin Smith	5	0	0	0	5
6	(Scotland)	Ryan McGuffie	3	1	0	0	4
7	(Scotland)	Allan Johnston	2	0	1	0	3
8	(Scotland)	Stephen McKenna	2	0	0	0	2
=	(Scotland)	Chris Higgins	2	0	0	0	2
=	(Scotland)	Gavin Reilly	2	0	0	0	2
11	(Scotland)	Nicky Clark	0	0	1	0	1
=	(Scotland)	Stephen Simmons	1	0	0	0	1
=	(Scotland)	Mark Campbell	1	0	0	0	1

=== Clean sheets ===
R	Pos	Nat	Name	League	Scottish Cup	League Cup	Challenge Cup	Total
1	GK	(England)	Lee Robinson	7	1	1	0	9
2	GK	(Scotland)	Roddy McKenzie	0	0	0	0	0
			Totals	6	1	1	0	8

Last updated: 5 May 2012
Source: Match reports in Competitive matches

== Team statistics ==
=== League table ===
Pos	Team	Pld	W	D	L	GF	GA	GD	Pts	Promotion, qualification or relegation
6	Partick Thistle	36	12	11	13	50	39	+11	47	
7	Raith Rovers	36	11	11	14	46	49	−3	44	
8	Greenock Morton	36	10	12	14	40	55	−15	42	
9	Ayr United (R)	36	9	11	16	44	67	−23	38	Qualification for the First Division play-offs
10	Queen of the South (R)	36	7	11	18	38	64	−26	32	Relegation to the Second Division

Source: SPFL Archive
Rules for classification: 1) points; 2) goal difference; 3) number of goals scored.
(R) Relegated

=== Results summary ===
Overall								Home						Away					
Pld	W	D	L	GF	GA	GD	Pts	W	D	L	GF	GA	GD	W	D	L	GF	GA	GD
36	7	11	18	38	64	−26	32	6	5	7	21	31	−10	1	6	11	17	33	−16

Last updated: 5 May 2012.
Source: Competitive matches

=== Results by round ===
Round	1	2	3	4	5	6	7	8	9	10	11	12	13	14	15	16	17	18	19	20	21	22	23	24	25	26	27	28	29	30	31	32	33	34	35	36
Ground	A	H	A	A	H	H	A	H	A	A	H	A	H	A	H	A	H	A	H	H	A	H	A	H	A	A	H	H	A	H	A	A	H	H	A	H
Result	D	L	L	L	W	W	L	D	L	W	L	L	D	D	W	L	L	L	L	D	D	W	D	D	L	L	W	L	L	W	D	D	D	L	L	L
Position	4	8	10	10	10	7	9	8	9	8	9	10	10	10	8	8	9	10	10	10	10	9	9	8	10	10	10	10	10	10	10	10	10	10	10	10

Updated to match(es) played on 5 May 2012. Source: Statto.com
A = Away; H = Home; W = Win; D = Draw; L = Loss

=== Results by opponent ===
Last updated on 5 May 2012

Team	League Results^{[a]}				Points
Team	1	2	3	4	Points
Ayr United	0–1	4–1	1–1	2–1	7
Dundee	0–0	1–2	1–1	1–1	3
Falkirk	0–1	1–5	0–3	0–0	1
Greenock Morton	4–1	2–2	2–1	2–2	8
Hamilton Academical	1–0	1–3	1–2	0–3	3
Livingston	2–2	0–2	2–2	0–4	2
Partick Thistle	1–2	0–0	0–1	0–5	1
Raith Rovers	1–3	2–0	1–0	1–3	6
Ross County	0–2	0–0	1–2	3–5	1

Source: 2011–12 Scottish First Division Results Table

a. Queen of the South's score is shown first.

== Transfers ==
=== Players in ===
Player	From	Fee
Stephen Simmons	Raith Rovers	Free
Mark Campbell	Raith Rovers	Free
Kevin Smith	Notts County	Free
Chris Higgins	Dunfermline Athletic	Free
Scott McLaughlin	Ayr United	Free
Nicky Clark	Peterhead	Free
Tom Brighton	Stirling Albion	Free
Alan Reid	Unattached	Free
Lee Robinson	Unattached	Free
Marc McCusker	Clyde	Free
Sam Parkin	St Johnstone	Free
John Potter	Dunfermline Athletic	Loan

=== Players out ===
Player	To	Fee
Derek Holmes	Airdrie United	Free
Willie McLaren	Hamilton Academical	Free
David Lilley	Airdrie United	Free
Colin McMenamin	Ross County	Free
Paul Burns	Dunfermline Athletic	Free
Rocco Quinn	Ross County	Free
David Hutton	Hamilton Academical	Free
Robert Harris	Blackpool	Free
Ross Hyslop	Annan Athletic	Free
Neil Scally	Free agent	Free
David Weatherston	Falkirk	Free
Roddy McKenzie	Free agent	Free
Mark Campbell	Irvine Meadow	Free

== See also ==
- List of Queen of the South F.C. seasons
