= 2012–13 Annan Athletic F.C. season =

Annan Athletic
2012–13 season
- Manager: Harry Cairney (Until 20 December 2012); Jim Chapman (From 12 January 2013)
- Stadium: Galabank
- Third Division: Eighth place
- Challenge Cup: Second round, lost to Stenhousemuir
- League Cup: First round, lost to Hamilton Academical
- Scottish Cup: Second round, lost to Buckie Thistle
- Top goalscorer: League: Ally Love (12); All: Ally Love (12)
- Highest home attendance: 2,517 vs Rangers; Third Division; 15 September 2012
- Lowest home attendance: 242 vs Queen's Park; Third Division; 10 April 2013

The 2012–13 season was Annan Athletic's fifth consecutive season in the Scottish Third Division, having been admitted to the Scottish Football League at the start of the 2008–09 season. Annan also competed in the Challenge Cup, League Cup and the Scottish Cup.

== Summary ==
=== Season ===
Annan Athletic finished eighth in the Scottish Third Division. They reached the second round of the Challenge Cup, the first round of the League Cup and the second round of the Scottish Cup.

=== Management ===
They began the season under the management of Harry Cairney. On 21 December 2012, Cairney resigned as manager citing personal reasons with Euan Brydson taking over as manager on an interim basis. On 12 January 2013, Jim Chapman was appointed as the club's new manager.

== Results & fixtures ==
Win Draw Loss Postponed

=== Pre-season ===
30 June 2012 Friendly	Abbey Vale	1 – 5	Annan Athletic	Maryfield Park
14:00	Goal	Annan Report	Bell; Chaplain; Daly; Ramage

2 July 2012 Friendly	Dalbeattie Star	2 – 2	Annan Athletic	Islecroft Stadium
19:30	Goal	Report	Donley; Swinglehurst

6 July 2012 Friendly	Threave Rovers	0 – 5	Annan Athletic	Meadow Park
19:00		Report	Daly 22'; Ramage 33', 51'; Donley 63', 68'

10 July 2012 Friendly	Celtic Nation	2 – 1	Annan Athletic	Newton Rigg
19:30	Goal	Report	Murray

14 July 2012 Friendly	Gala Fairydean	1 – 3	Annan Athletic	Netherdale
15:00	Goal	Report	Daly; Ramage

17 July 2012 Friendly	Stenhousemuir	0 – 1	Annan Athletic	Ochilview Park
19:30		Report	Chaplain 54'	Referee: Cook

21 July 2012 Friendly	Spartans	1 – 2	Annan Athletic	Ainslie Park
14:30	Goal	Report	Daly 18', 44'

=== Scottish Third Division ===
11 August 2012 Scottish Third Division	Stirling Albion	5 – 1	Annan Athletic	Forthbank Stadium
15:00	Davidson 16'; Weir 31'; Ashe 37'; Clark 42'; McPherson 67'	SFL Report	Ramage (red card) 28'; Bell 72'	Attendance: 646 Attendance; Referee: Aitken

18 August 2012 Scottish Third Division	Annan Athletic	3 – 2	Berwick Rangers	Galabank Stadium
15:00	Chaplain 56' (Penalty), 59'; Love 61'	SFL Report	Addison 14'; McLaren 25'	Attendance: 512; Referee: Ross

25 August 2012 Scottish Third Division	Montrose	0 – 0	Annan Athletic	Links Park
15:00		SFL Report		Attendance: 267; Referee: Anderson

1 September 2012 Scottish Third Division	Clyde	2 – 1	Annan Athletic	Broadwood Stadium
15:00	Watt 26'; Chaplain 58' (Own Goal)	SFL Report; Clyde Report	Thorburn 55'	Attendance: 505; Referee: Roache

15 September 2012 Scottish Third Division	Annan Athletic	0 – 0	Rangers	Galabank Stadium
15:00		SFL Report		Attendance: 2,517; Referee: Charleston

22 September 2012 Scottish Third Division	Annan Athletic	2 – 1	Peterhead	Galabank Stadium
15:00	Ramage 2'; Daly 56'	SFL Report	Bavidge 85'	Attendance: 484; Referee: Robertson

13 October 2012 Scottish Third Division	Queen's Park	2 – 2	Annan Athletic	Hampden Park
15:00	Burns 37'; Shankland 48'	SFL Report	Ramage 20'; McGowan 70'	Attendance: 626; Referee: Somers

20 October 2012 Scottish Third Division	Elgin City	2 – 2	Annan Athletic	Borough Briggs
15:00	Duff 30'; Gunn 38'	SFL Report	Hopkirk 34', 46'	Attendance: 734; Referee: Anderson

27 October 2012 Scottish Third Division	Annan Athletic	5 – 2	East Stirlingshire	Galabank
15:00	Hopkirk 42', 68', 90'; Love 45'; Chaplain 79' (pen.)	SFL Report	Quinn 60'; Miller (red card) 78'; Shepherd 90+2'	Attendance: 374; Referee: Cook

10 November 2012 Scottish Third Division	Annan Athletic	5 – 2	Stirling Albion	Galabank
15:00	Love 30', 89'; Chaplain 37'; McGachie 67'; Daly 85'	SFL Report	Filler (red card) 21'; Thom (red card) 45'; Weir 60'; Day 73'	Attendance: 508; Referee: Ross

17 November 2012 Scottish Third Division	Berwick Rangers	3 – 1	Annan Athletic	Shielfield Park
15:00	Lavery 24'; Gray 44'; Hoskins 54'	SFL Report	Ramage 90'	Attendance: 460; Referee: Anderson

24 November 2012 Scottish Third Division	Annan Athletic	1 – 3	Clyde	Galabank
15:00	Swinglehurst (yellow card) 39' (yellow-red card); Chaplain 79' (Penalty)	SFL Report	Gilfillan 12', 49'; Marsh 16'; Marsh (yellow card) 23' (yellow-red card)	Attendance: 489; Referee: Hilland

8 December 2012 Scottish Third Division	Annan Athletic	2 – 3	Queen's Park	Galabank
15:00	Donley 89'; Daly 90+2'	SFL Report; BBC Report	Quinn 25' (Penalty); McParland 48'; Connolly 68'	Attendance: 453; Referee: Cook

15 December 2012 Scottish Third Division	Peterhead	2 – 0	Annan Athletic	Balmoor Stadium
15:00	McAllister 58'; Bavidge 84'	SFL Report		Attendance: 378; Referee: Roache

18 December 2012 Scottish Third Division	Rangers	3 – 0	Annan Athletic	Ibrox Stadium
19:45	Templeton 29', 70'; Wallace (red card) 59'; Little 64'	SFL Report		Attendance: 42,135; Referee: Robertson

22 December 2012 Scottish Third Division	East Stirlingshire	2 – 2	Annan Athletic	Ochilview Park
15:00	Stirling 37', 46' (Penalty)	SFL Report	Ramage 17'; Love 39'	Attendance: 192; Referee: Aitken

29 December 2012 Scottish Third Division	Annan Athletic	2 – 0	Elgin City	Galabank
15:00	Ramage 11'; Chaplain 80' (Penalty)	SFL Report		Attendance: 356; Referee: Duncan

2 January 2013 Scottish Third Division	Annan Athletic	1 – 3	Rangers	Galabank
12:45	Love 35'	BBC Report; Sky Report	Templeton 26', 83'; Crawford 63'	Attendance: 2,441; Referee: Finnie

5 January 2013 Scottish Third Division	Clyde	2 – 3	Annan Athletic	Broadwood Stadium
15:00	Sweeney 60'; Graham 78'	SFL Report	Chaplain 14'; Daly 15', 46'	Attendance: 524; Referee: McKendrick

12 January 2013 Scottish Third Division	Annan Athletic	2 – 1	Montrose	Galabank
15:00	Hopkirk 62'; Love 69'	SFL Report	Wood 89'	Attendance: 352; Referee: Graham

19 January 2013 Scottish Third Division	Stirling Albion	P – P	Annan Athletic	Forthbank Stadium
15:00		BBC Report
Note: Postponed due to frozen pitch

26 January 2013 Scottish Third Division	Annan Athletic	P – P	Peterhead	Galabank
15:00		BBC Report; SFL Report
Note: Pitch covered in snow

29 January 2013 Scottish Third Division	Annan Athletic	0 – 0	Peterhead	Galabank
19:30		SFL Report	Smith (red card) 82'	Attendance: 309; Referee: Colvin

2 February 2013 Scottish Third Division	Queen's Park	2 – 2	Annan Athletic	Hampden Park
15:00	Longworth 59', 85'	SFL Report	McNiff 21'; Love 83'	Attendance: 558; Referee: Newlands

9 February 2013 Scottish Third Division	Elgin City	3 – 1	Annan Athletic	Borough Briggs
15:00	Moore 14'; Harkins 23'; Gunn 43'	SFL Report	Daly 54'	Attendance: 550; Referee: Roache

16 February 2013 Scottish Third Division	Annan Athletic	1 – 2	East Stirlingshire	Galabank
15:00	Orsi 79'	SFL Report	Glasgow 49'; Holt 57'	Attendance: 349; Referee: Dallas

19 February 2013 Scottish Third Division	Stirling Albion	2 – 1	Annan Athletic	Forthbank Stadium
19:45	Weir 21'; White 50'	SFL Report	Chaplain 15'	Attendance: 327; Referee: Muir

23 February 2013 Scottish Third Division	Montrose	5 – 1	Annan Athletic	Links Park
15:00	Boyle 11', 15', 35', 46'; Winter 26' (Penalty)	SFL Report	Love 81'	Attendance: 425; Referee: Robertson

2 March 2013 Scottish Third Division	Annan Athletic	2 – 2	Berwick Rangers	Galabank
15:00	Love 62'; Chaplain 70'	SFL Report	Dalziel 14'; McLaren 67'	Attendance: 427; Referee: Aitken

9 March 2013 Scottish Third Division	Rangers	1 – 2	Annan Athletic	Ibrox Stadium
15:00	Little 59'	BBC Report; SFL Report; Sky Report	Love 48'; Hopkirk 55'	Attendance: 34,441; Referee: McKendrick

16 March 2013 Scottish Third Division	Annan Athletic	0 – 1	Clyde	Galabank
15:00		SFL Report	Sweeney 45+1' (Penalty)	Attendance: 464; Referee: Charleston

23 March 2013 Scottish Third Division	Annan Athletic	P – P	Queen's Park	Galabank
15:00		BBC Report
Note: Postponed due to snow

30 March 2013 Scottish Third Division	Peterhead	2 – 0	Annan Athletic	Balmoor
15:00	McAllister 70', 90'	SFL Report		Attendance: 483; Referee: Dallas

6 April 2013 Scottish Third Division	Annan Athletic	2 – 2	Elgin City	Galabank
15:00	Chisholm 69'; Hopkirk 90+1'	SFL Report	Morrison 77'; Wyness 90'	Attendance: 379; Referee: Finnie

10 April 2013 Scottish Third Division	Annan Athletic	2 – 0	Queen's Park	Galabank
19:45	Chaplain 28'; Hopkirk 84'	SFL Report		Attendance: 242; Referee: Hilland

13 April 2013 Scottish Third Division	East Stirlingshire	1 – 2	Annan Athletic	Ochilview Park
15:00	Wright 17'	SFL Report	Hopkirk 25'; Love 78'	Attendance: 288; Referee: Walsh

20 April 2013 Scottish Third Division	Annan Athletic	0 – 1	Stirling Albion	Galabank
15:00		SFL Report	Day 2'	Attendance: 488; Referee: Steven

27 April 2013 Scottish Third Division	Berwick Rangers	0 – 2	Annan Athletic	Shielfield Park
15:00	Currie (yellow card) 87' (yellow-red card)	SFL Report	Chaplain 45'; McNiff 90+3'	Attendance: 627; Referee: Newlands

4 May 2013 Scottish Third Division	Annan Athletic	1 – 1	Montrose	Galabank
12:45	Daly 58'	SFL Report	Johnston 24'	Attendance: 386; Referee: Somers

=== Scottish Challenge Cup ===
28 July 2012 Scottish Challenge Cup round 1	Annan Athletic	1 – 0	Livingston	Galabank
15:00	Bell 74'	SFL Report		Attendance: 572; Referee: Robertson

14 August 2012 Scottish Challenge Cup round 2	Annan Athletic	0 – 3	Stenhousemuir	Galabank
19:30		SFL Report	Kean 25'; Dickson 31'; Rodgers 60'	Attendance: 449; Referee: McKendrick

=== Scottish League Cup ===
4 August 2012 Scottish League Cup round 1	Hamilton Academical	2 – 0	Annan Athletic	New Douglas Park
15:00	Routledge 66'; Mackinnon 80'	SFL Report		Attendance: 620; Referee: Collum

=== Scottish Cup ===
29 September 2012 Scottish Cup round 2	Buckie Thistle	0 – 0	Annan Athletic	Victoria Park
15:00		Sky Sports		Attendance: 356; Referee: Duncan

6 October 2012 Scottish Cup round 2 Replay	Annan Athletic	1 – 2	Buckie Thistle	Galabank
15:00	Chaplain 48'	Sky Report	Sutherland 59', 77'; Carrol (red card) 60'	Attendance: 404; Referee: Duncan

== Player statistics ==
=== Squad ===
Last updated 13 May 2013

No.	Pos	Nat	Player	Total		Third Division		Challenge Cup		League Cup		Scottish Cup	
No.	Pos	Nat	Player	Apps	Goals	Apps	Goals	Apps	Goals	Apps	Goals	Apps	Goals
	GK	(Scotland) SCO	Alex Mitchell	38	0	34+0	0	2+0	0	0+0	0	2+0	0
	GK	(England) ENG	Craig Summersgill	3	0	2+0	0	0+0	0	1+0	0	0+0	0
	DF	(Scotland) SCO	Steven Black	3	0	1+2	0	0+0	0	0+0	0	0+0	0
	DF	(Scotland) SCO	Jonathan Blake	28	0	23+0	0	2+0	0	1+0	0	2+0	0
	DF	(Scotland) SCO	Iain Chisholm	11	1	11+0	1	0+0	0	0+0	0	0+0	0
	DF	(Scotland) SCO	Ally Love	34	12	20+10	12	2+0	0	0+1	0	0+1	0
	DF	(Scotland) SCO	Michael McGowan	41	1	36+0	1	2+0	0	1+0	0	2+0	0
	DF	(England) ENG	Steven Swinglehurst	34	0	29+0	0	2+0	0	1+0	0	2+0	0
	DF	(Scotland) SCO	Greig Thorburn	15	1	7+5	1	2+0	0	1+0	0	0+0	0
	DF	(Scotland) SCO	Lee Underwood	0	0	0+0	0	0+0	0	0+0	0	0+0	0
	DF	(Scotland) SCO	Peter Watson	21	0	17+2	0	0+0	0	0+0	0	2+0	0
	DF	(Scotland) SCO	John Watson	4	0	1+3	0	0+0	0	0+0	0	0+0	0
	MF	(Scotland) SCO	Scott Chaplain	41	12	35+1	11	2+0	0	1+0	0	2+0	1
	MF	(Scotland) SCO	David Hopkirk	20	10	18+2	10	0+0	0	0+0	0	0+0	0
	MF	(Scotland) SCO	Chris Jardine	35	0	28+3	0	1+0	0	1+0	0	2+0	0
	MF	(Scotland) SCO	Jordan McKechnie	25	0	10+11	0	1+0	0	0+1	0	0+2	0
	MF	(Scotland) SCO	Martin McNiff	16	2	15+1	2	0+0	0	0+0	0	0+0	0
	MF	(Scotland) SCO	Harry Monaghan	15	0	11+4	0	0+0	0	0+0	0	0+0	0
	MF	(Scotland) SCO	Dan Orsi	7	1	7+0	1	0+0	0	0+0	0	0+0	0
	MF	(Scotland) SCO	Steven Sloan	32	0	20+9	0	1+0	0	0+0	0	2+0	0
	MF	(Scotland) SCO	Jack Steele	18	0	13+2	0	1+1	0	1+0	0	0+0	0
	FW	(Scotland) SCO	Graeme Bell	3	2	0+1	1	0+1	1	1+0	0	0+0	0
	FW	(Scotland) SCO	Michael Daly	35	7	23+7	7	2+0	0	1+0	0	2+0	0
	FW	(Scotland) SCO	Andrew Donely	12	1	3+9	1	0+0	0	0+0	0	0+0	0
	FW	(Scotland) SCO	Lewis Hawke	6	0	2+4	0	0+0	0	0+0	0	0+0	0
	FW	(Scotland) SCO	Kieran McGachie	16	1	8+4	1	0+2	0	0+0	0	0+2	0
	FW	(Scotland) SCO	David Murray	18	0	7+7	0	1+0	0	1+0	0	2+0	0
	FW	(Scotland) SCO	Graeme Ramage	19	5	14+1	5	1+0	0	0+1	0	2+0	0

=== Disciplinary record ===
Includes all competitive matches.

Last updated 13 May 2013

Nation	Position	Name	Third Division		Challenge Cup		League Cup		Scottish Cup		Total	
Nation	Position	Name	Yellow card	Red card	Yellow card	Red card	Yellow card	Red card	Yellow card	Red card	Yellow card	Red card
(Scotland)	GK	Alex Mitchell	1	0	0	0	0	0	0	0	1	0
(England)	GK	Craig Summersgill	0	0	0	0	0	0	0	0	0	0
(Scotland)	DF	Steven Black	1	0	0	0	0	0	0	0	1	0
(Scotland)	DF	Jonathan Blake	0	0	1	0	0	0	0	0	1	0
(Scotland)	DF	Iain Chisholm	3	0	0	0	0	0	0	0	3	0
(Scotland)	DF	Sean Currie	0	0	0	0	0	0	0	0	0	0
(Scotland)	DF	Scott Gibson	0	0	0	0	0	0	0	0	0	0
(Scotland)	DF	Ally Love	2	0	0	0	0	0	0	0	2	0
(Scotland)	DF	Michael McGowan	3	0	0	0	0	0	0	0	3	0
(England)	DF	Steven Swinglehurst	3	1	0	0	0	0	0	0	3	1
(Scotland)	DF	Greig Thorburn	0	0	0	0	0	0	0	0	0	0
(Scotland)	DF	Lee Underwood	0	0	0	0	0	0	0	0	0	0
(Scotland)	DF	Peter Watson	1	0	0	0	0	0	1	0	2	0
(Scotland)	DF	John Watson	0	0	0	0	0	0	0	0	0	0
(Scotland)	MF	Scott Chaplain	6	0	0	0	0	0	1	0	7	0
(Scotland)	MF	David Hopkirk	1	0	0	0	0	0	0	0	1	0
(Scotland)	MF	Chris Jardine	6	0	0	0	0	0	0	0	6	0
(Scotland)	MF	Jordan McKechnie	2	0	1	0	0	0	0	0	3	0
(Scotland)	MF	Martin McNiff	2	0	0	0	0	0	0	0	2	0
(Scotland)	MF	Harry Monaghan	3	0	0	0	0	0	0	0	3	0
(Scotland)	MF	Dan Orsi	1	0	0	0	0	0	0	0	1	0
(Scotland)	MF	Steven Sloan	3	0	0	0	0	0	0	0	3	0
(Scotland)	MF	Jack Steele	2	0	0	0	1	0	0	0	3	0
(Scotland)	FW	Graeme Bell	0	0	0	0	0	0	0	0	0	0
(Scotland)	FW	Michael Daly	6	0	0	0	0	0	0	0	6	0
(Scotland)	FW	Andrew Donely	0	0	0	0	0	0	0	0	0	0
(Scotland)	FW	Lewis Hawke	0	0	0	0	0	0	0	0	0	0
(Scotland)	FW	Kieran McGachie	2	0	0	0	0	0	0	0	2	0
(Scotland)	FW	David Murray	0	0	0	0	0	0	0	0	0	0
(Scotland)	FW	Graeme Ramage	0	1	0	0	0	0	0	0	1	0

== Team statistics ==
=== League table ===
Pos	Team	Pld	W	D	L	GF	GA	GD	Pts
6	Montrose	36	12	11	13	60	68	−8	47
7	Stirling Albion	36	12	9	15	59	58	+1	45
8	Annan Athletic	36	11	10	15	54	65	−11	43
9	Clyde	36	12	4	20	42	66	−24	40
10	East Stirlingshire	36	8	5	23	49	97	−48	29

Source: SPFL archive
Rules for classification: 1) points; 2) goal difference; 3) number of goals scored.

=== Division summary ===
Round	1	2	3	4	5	6	7	8	9	10	11	12	13	14	15	16	17	18	19	20	21	22	23	24	25	26	27	28	29	30	31	32	33	34	35	36
Ground	A	H	A	A	H	H	A	A	H	H	A	H	H	A	A	A	H	H	A	H	H	A	A	H	A	A	H	A	H	A	H	H	A	H	A	H
Result	L	W	D	L	D	W	D	D	W	W	L	L	L	L	L	D	W	L	W	W	D	D	L	L	L	L	D	W	L	L	D	W	W	L	W	D
Position	10	7	6	7	8	7	5	7	5	3	5	6	7	7	7	7	6	7	7	6	6	6	6	6	6	7	8	8	8	9	9	9	7	9	8	8

Updated to match(es) played on 13 May 2013. Source:
A = Away; H = Home; W = Win; D = Draw; L = Loss

== Transfers ==
=== Players in ===
Player	From	Fee
(Scotland) Michael Daly	(Scotland) Queen's Park	Free
(England) Steven Swinglehurst	(England) Carlisle United	Free
(Scotland) David Murray	(Scotland) Queen's Park	Free
(Scotland) Scott Chaplain	(Scotland) Albion Rovers	Free
(Scotland) Kieran McGachie	(Scotland) Motherwell	Free
(Scotland) Ally Love	(Scotland) Kirkintilloch Rob Roy	Free
(Scotland) Graeme Ramage	(Scotland) Dumbarton	Free
(Scotland) Andrew Donely	(Scotland) Threave Rovers	Free
(Scotland) Greig Thorburn	(Scotland) Kilmarnock	Free
(Scotland) Jonathan Blake	(Scotland) Gretna 2008	Free
(Scotland) David Hopkirk	(Scotland) Queen of the South	Loan
(Scotland) Harry Monaghan	(Scotland) Hibernian	Loan
(Scotland) David Hopkirk	(Scotland) Queen of the South	Free
(Scotland) Martin McNiff	(Scotland) Dumbarton	Loan
(Scotland) Dan Orsi	(Scotland) Queen of the South	Loan
(Scotland) Lewis Hawke	(Scotland) Greenock Morton	Free
(Scotland) Steven Black	(Scotland) Queen of the South	Loan

=== Players out ===
Player	To	Fee
(England) Sean O'Connor	(England) Hednesford Town	Free
(Scotland) David Cox	(Scotland) Annan Athletic	Free
(Northern Ireland) Bryan Gilfillan	(Scotland) Clyde	Free
(Scotland) Danny Mitchell	(Scotland) Glenafton Athletic	Free
(Scotland) David Winters	(Scotland) Ayr United	Free
(Scotland) Aaron Muirhead	(Scotland) Partick Thistle	Undisclosed
(Scotland) Jonny Jamieson	Free agent	Free
(Scotland) John MacBeth	(Scotland) Dalbeattie Star	Free
(Scotland) Graeme Bell	Free agent	Free
(Scotland) Kieran McGachie	(Scotland) Clyde	Free
(Scotland) Andrew Donely	(Scotland) St Cuthbert Wanderers	Loan
(Scotland) Conor Jamieson	(Scotland) Lesmahagow	Loan

== See also ==
- List of Annan Athletic F.C. seasons
