= 2021–22 Scottish Cup =

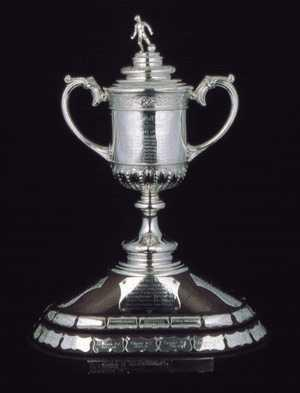

Tournament details
- Country: Scotland
- Teams: 113

Final positions
- Champions: Rangers
- Runners-up: Heart of Midlothian

Tournament statistics
- Matches played: 127
- Goals scored: 399 (3.14 per match)
- Top goal scorer: João Vitoria (6 goals)
- All statistics correct as of 21 May 2022.

The 2021–22 Scottish Cup was the 137th season of Scotland's most prestigious football knockout competition.

The defending champions St Johnstone, who won the 2021 Scottish Cup Final on 22 May 2021, were defeated by Kelty Hearts in the fourth round.

== Calendar ==
The calendar for the 2021–22 Scottish Cup was announced by Scottish Football Association on 30 July 2021.

The format featured several changes from the previous season, with all Highland and Lowland League teams entering in the same round. Replays were re-introduced for drawn matches played before the fourth round after they were removed for the 2020–21 competition. However, replays that were level after 90 minutes went directly to a penalty shootout instead of playing extra time.

Round	Original date	Number of fixtures	Clubs	New Entries	Leagues entering at this round
Preliminary round	28 August 2021	11	113 → 102	37	
First round	18 September 2021	30	102 → 72	34	18 Highland League teams 16 Lowland League teams
Second round	23 October 2021	20	72 → 52	10	10 League Two teams
Third round	27 November 2021	20	52 → 32	20	10 Championship teams 10 League One teams
Fourth round	22 January 2022	16	32 → 16	12	12 Premiership teams
Fifth round	12 February 2022	8	16 → 8	None	
Quarter-finals	12 March 2022	4	8 → 4	None	
Semi-finals	16 & 17 April 2022	2	4 → 2	None	
Final	21 May 2022	1	2 → 1	None	

== Preliminary round ==
The preliminary round took place on 28 August 2021.

Cumnock Juniors, Dalkeith Thistle, Darvel, Dunbar United, and Sauchie Juniors took part in the Scottish Cup for the first time having each gained their Club Licence. Auchinleck Talbot, Irvine Meadow, Musselburgh Athletic also competed for the first time as SFA members rather than qualifiers. Clydebank made their first appearance in the Scottish Cup since 2001–02 after re-founding as a junior club in 2003 and gaining their SFA licence.

=== Draw ===
Teams in bold advanced to the first round.

East of Scotland League	South of Scotland League	West of Scotland League	North Caledonian League	SJFA North Region
Premier Division: **Blackburn United**; Broxburn Athletic; **Camelon Juniors**; **Dunbar United**; Dundonald Bluebell; **Hill of Beath Hawthorn**; **Jeanfield Swifts**; Linlithgow Rose; **Lothian Thistle Hutchison Vale**; Musselburgh Athletic; **Newtongrange Star**; **Penicuik Athletic**; **Sauchie Juniors**; **Tranent Juniors**; **Tynecastle**; Whitehill Welfare; First Division: Burntisland Shipyard; **Coldstream**; **Dalkeith Thistle**; **Dunipace**; Easthouses Lily Miners Welfare; **Haddington Athletic**; Hawick Royal Albert United; **Preston Athletic**	Newton Stewart; **St Cuthbert Wanderers**; Threave Rovers; **Wigtown & Bladnoch**	Premier Division: **Auchinleck Talbot**; **Clydebank**; **Cumnock Juniors**; **Darvel**; **Irvine Meadow**; Tier 7 Conferences: Girvan; **Glasgow University**	**Golspie Sutherland**	North Superleague: **Banks O' Dee**

The draw for the preliminary round took place on 12 August 2021. Auchinleck Talbot, Camelon Juniors, Clydebank, Cumnock Juniors, Darvel, Dunipace, Glasgow University, Haddington Athletic, Hill of Beath Hawthorn, Lothian Thistle Hutchison Vale, Newtongrange Star, Sauchie, St Cuthbert Wanderers, Tranent Juniors and Wigtown & Bladnoch all received a bye to the first round.

=== Matches ===
28 August 2021	Linlithgow Rose	**1–2**	**Banks O' Dee**	Linlithgow
15:00	Halleran 40'		Henderson 32'; Gilmour 90'	Stadium: Prestonfield; Referee: Calum Scott

28 August 2021	Burntisland Shipyard	**1–1**	Dalkeith Thistle	Burntisland
15:00	Anthony 6'		Aitchison 22'	Stadium: Recreation Park; Referee: Ryan Lee

28 August 2021	Newton Stewart	**1–3**	**Coldstream**	Newton Stewart
15:00	Whyte 50'		Allan 7'; Briggs 9'; Simpson 33'	Stadium: Blairmount Park; Referee: Sean Henderson

28 August 2021	**Irvine Meadow**	**2–1**	Musselburgh Athletic	Irvine
15:00	McManus 62' (o.g.); Boyd 69'		McManus 7'	Stadium: Meadow Park; Referee: Lorraine Watson

28 August 2021	Dundonald Bluebell	**1–3**	**Penicuik Athletic**	Cardenden
15:00	Drummond 10'		Finnie 12'; Reid 36', 89'	Stadium: Moorside Park; Referee: Stewart Luke

28 August 2021	**Preston Athletic**	**2–0**	Threave Rovers	Prestonpans
15:00	Grotlin 62', 67'			Stadium: Pennypit Park; Referee: Regan Wallace

28 August 2021	Hawick Royal Albert United	**0–2**	**Golspie Sutherland**	Hawick
15:00			Bremner 35'; Mackay 54'	Stadium: Albert Park; Referee: Daniel Graves

28 August 2021	**Blackburn United**	**2–1**	Easthouses Lily Miners Welfare	Blackburn
15:00	Heath 19'; Campbell 44'		Russell 21'	Stadium: New Murrayfield Park; Referee: Greg Soutar

28 August 2021	**Tynecastle**	**4–2**	Girvan	Edinburgh
15:00	Combe 14'; Cameron 44'; Hendry 67', 75'		McLelland 2'; Orr 90+2'	Stadium: Meggetland Sports Complex; Referee: Colin Whyte

28 August 2021	**Jeanfield Swifts**	**4–1**	Whitehill Welfare	Perth
15:00	McLeish 10'; Fergus 20', 33'; Smith 87'		Miller 60'	Stadium: Riverside Stadium; Referee: Ross Hardie

28 August 2021	**Dunbar United**	**3–1**	Broxburn Athletic	Dunbar
15:00	Jones 4'; Devlin 66', 74'		Ireland 40'	Stadium: New Countess Park; Referee: George Calder

=== Replay ===
4 September 2021	**Dalkeith Thistle**	**3–3** (**6–5** p)	Burntisland Shipyard	Dalkeith
15:00	Leslie 16', 21'; Woods 57'		Wilson 48'; Anthony 77'; Johnston 79' (o.g.)	Stadium: King's Park; Referee: Ryan Lee

== First round ==
The first round took place on the weekend of 18 September 2021. Along with the 11 winners from the preliminary round and 15 teams with byes, there were 34 new entries at this stage - 18 from the Highland Football League and 16 from the Lowland Football League. The draw took place on 29 August 2021.

=== Draw ===
Teams in bold advanced to the second round.

Highland League	Lowland League	East of Scotland League	West of Scotland League	Other
**Brechin City**; **Brora Rangers**; **Buckie Thistle**; Clachnacuddin; Deveronvale; **Formartine United**; Forres Mechanics; Fort William; Fraserburgh; **Huntly**; Inverurie Loco Works; Keith; Lossiemouth; **Nairn County**; **Rothes**; Strathspey Thistle; Turriff United; Wick Academy	**Berwick Rangers**; **Bo'ness United**; **Bonnyrigg Rose Athletic**; **Broomhill**; Caledonian Braves; **Civil Service Strollers**; Cumbernauld Colts; **Dalbeattie Star**; **East Kilbride**; **East Stirlingshire**; Edinburgh University; **Gala Fairydean Rovers**; Gretna 2008; The Spartans; **University of Stirling**; Vale of Leithen	Premier Division: Blackburn United; Camelon Juniors; **Dunbar United**; Hill of Beath Hawthorn; **Jeanfield Swifts**; **Lothian Thistle Hutchison Vale**; Newtongrange Star; Penicuik Athletic; **Sauchie Juniors**; **Tranent Juniors**; Tynecastle; First Division: Dalkeith Thistle; Coldstream; **Dunipace**; **Haddington Athletic**; **Preston Athletic**	Premier Division: **Auchinleck Talbot**; **Clydebank**; Cumnock Juniors; **Darvel**; Irvine Meadow; Tier 7 Conferences: Glasgow University	North Caledonian League: Golspie Sutherland; North Superleague: **Banks O' Dee**; South of Scotland League: **St Cuthbert Wanderers**; Wigtown & Bladnoch

=== Matches ===
17 September 2021	**East Stirlingshire**	**3–0**	Fort William	Falkirk
19:45	Hamilton 45'; Fulton 53'; Turner 70'			Stadium: Falkirk Stadium; Referee: Andy Taylor

17 September 2021	Cumbernauld Colts	**1–1**	Buckie Thistle	Cumbernauld
20:00	Murray 54'		McLeod 60'	Stadium: Broadwood Stadium; Referee: Matthew MacDermid

18 September 2021	Penicuik Athletic	**1–3**	**Tranent Juniors**	Penicuik
14:30	Forbes 20'		Stevenson 44'; Docherty 75'; Miller 85'	Stadium: Penicuik Park; Referee: Barry Dickson

18 September 2021	**Nairn County**	**4–0**	Strathspey Thistle	Nairn
15:00	Gethins 30'; Williamson 49'; Shewan 80'; Main 82'			Stadium: Station Park; Referee: Gary Hanvidge

18 September 2021	Wigtown & Bladnoch	**0–8**	**St Cuthbert Wanderers**	Wigtown
15:00			Meechan 15', 56', 87'; Milligan 34' (pen.), 53'; Hunter 52', 60', 77'	Stadium: Trammondford Park; Referee: Ross Menzies

18 September 2021	Fraserburgh	**1–2**	**Sauchie Juniors**	Fraserburgh
15:00	Harris 5'		Smith 73'; Kelly 76'	Stadium: Bellslea Park; Referee: Michael McCart

18 September 2021	**Banks O' Dee**	**1–0**	Turriff United	Aberdeen
15:00	MacLeod 76'			Stadium: Spain Park; Referee: Calum Haswell

18 September 2021	Newtongrange Star	**1–1**	Dalbeattie Star	Newtongrange
15:00	McIntosh 19'		Cairnie 53'	Stadium: New Victoria Park; Referee: Lee Robertson

18 September 2021	The Spartans	**0–1**	**Gala Fairydean Rovers**	Edinburgh
15:00			Healy 90'	Stadium: Ainslie Park; Referee: Barry Cook

18 September 2021	Blackburn United	**1–2**	**Rothes**	Blackburn
15:00	McQuillan 16'		Robertson 62'; Hyde 90'	Stadium: New Murrayfield Park; Referee: Steven Reid

18 September 2021	**Broomhill**	**6–0**	Glasgow University	Alloa
15:00	Duncan 37'; Cusick 42', 89'; Kavanagh 62', 77'; Gray 79'			Stadium: Recreation Park; Referee: Calum Scott

18 September 2021	Coldstream	**1–10**	**East Kilbride**	Coldstream
15:00	Straughan 82'		Erskine 6', 49'; McLaughlin 35', 36'; Victoria 28', 61', 63', 90'; Miller 70'; Stainrod 73'	Stadium: Home Park; Referee: Stewart Luke

18 September 2021	**Clydebank**	**7–0**	Dalkeith Thistle	Clydebank
15:00	McKinlay 28', 51'; Slattery 33'; Holmes 41', 90'; Green 57'; McPherson 67'			Stadium: Holm Park; Referee: Keiran Trayner

18 September 2021	Caledonian Braves	**0–1**	**University of Stirling**	Motherwell
15:00			Rae 23'	Stadium: Alliance Park; Referee: George Calder

18 September 2021	Lossiemouth	**0–3**	**Preston Athletic**	Lossiemouth
15:00			Molloy 10', 34'; Jack 89'	Stadium: Grant Park; Referee: Ross Anderson

18 September 2021	**Dunbar United**	**2–0**	Camelon Juniors	Dunbar
15:00	Jones 39'; Edmond 45'			Stadium: New Countess Park; Referee: Gordon Seago

18 September 2021	**Brechin City**	**5–0**	Vale of Leithen	Brechin
15:00	Scott 2', 76'; Inglis 4'; Wade 28'; Cox 45'			Stadium: Glebe Park; Referee: Terry Ormiston

18 September 2021	Inverurie Loco Works	**0–3**	**Jeanfield Swifts**	Inverurie
15:00			McLaren 1', 48'; Smith 5'	Stadium: Harlaw Park; Referee: Frazer Bushell

18 September 2021	Keith	**1–2**	**Darvel**	Keith
15:00	Nawrocki 53'		Miller 8'; MacKenzie 13'	Stadium: Kynoch Park; Referee: Ryan Lee

18 September 2021	Golspie Sutherland	**0–3**	**Civil Service Strollers**	Golspie
15:00			Moffat 30'; Valentine 50'; Johnston 75'	Stadium: King George V Park; Referee: Greg Soutar

18 September 2021	Wick Academy	**2–2**	Bo'ness United	Wick
15:00	Henry 19'; Anderson 52'		Miller 39'; Flynn 74'	Stadium: Harmsworth Park; Referee: Alex Shepherd

18 September 2021	Formartine United	**2–2**	Cumnock Juniors	Pitmedden
15:00	S. Smith 48'; J. Smith 73'		Frye 30'; Veitch 84'	Stadium: North Lodge Park; Referee: Chris Fordyce

18 September 2021	**Huntly**	**3–0**	Hill of Beath Hawthorn	Huntly
15:00	Elphinstone 22'; Imbert-Thomas 24'; Dalling 63'			Stadium: Christie Park; Referee: Mark Harris

18 September 2021	Irvine Meadow	**1–3**	**Auchinleck Talbot**	Irvine
15:00	McLennan 18'		Armstrong 58'; Shankland 72'; Samson 75'	Stadium: Meadow Park; Referee: Duncan Nicolson

18 September 2021	Forres Mechanics	**0–2**	**Bonnyrigg Rose Athletic**	Forres
15:00			McGachie 33'; Hunter 90'	Stadium: Mosset Park; Referee: Daniel Graves

18 September 2021	Deveronvale	**2–2**	Haddington Athletic	Banff
15:00	Ballard 62'; Tinnock 90'		Hill 3'; Auriemma 74'	Stadium: Princess Royal Park; Referee: Andy Gamble

18 September 2021	Clachnacuddin	**1–2**	**Dunipace**	Inverness
15:00	Anderson 85'		Fleming 63'; Grant 65'	Stadium: Grant Street Park; Referee: Robin Taylor

18 September 2021	Tynecastle	**0–6**	**Brora Rangers**	Edinburgh
15:00			MacRae 9', 28', 48'; Gillespie 33'; Wright 78', 81'	Stadium: Meggetland Sports Complex; Referee: Brent Falconer

19 September 2021	Lothian Thistle Hutchison Vale	**2–2**	Edinburgh University	Edinburgh
15:00	Douglas 59'; O'Brien 65'		Lawson 14'; Watson 26'	Stadium: Ainslie Park; Referee: Harry Bruce

20 September 2021	**Berwick Rangers**	**2–1**	Gretna 2008	Berwick-upon-Tweed, England
19:45	Harris 3'; Martins 29' (o.g.)		Cooper 36'	Stadium: Shielfield Park; Referee: Peter Stuart

=== Replays ===
25 September 2021	**Buckie Thistle**	**4–1**	Cumbernauld Colts	Buckie
15:00	Barry 10'; McLeod 17', 76'; Urquhart 28'		MacPherson 65'	Stadium: Victoria Park; Referee: Filippo Mazonni

25 September 2021	Cumnock Juniors	**1–5**	**Formartine United**	Cumnock
15:00	McAusland 47'		Rodger 17'; J. Smith 18'; Mykyta 23'; Lisle 38'; Anderson 74'	Stadium: Townhead Park; Referee: Ross Hardie

25 September 2021	**Dalbeattie Star**	**3–2**	Newtongrange Star	Dalbeattie
15:00	Currie 55'; Orsi 60'; Graham 90'		Conlon 3'; McIntosh 34'	Stadium: Islecroft Stadium; Referee: Lee Robertson

25 September 2021	Edinburgh University	**0–3**	**Lothian Thistle Hutchison Vale**	Edinburgh
15:00			Signorini 11'; Kemp 50'; Douglas 68'	Stadium: East Peffermill; Referee: Harry Bruce

25 September 2021	**Haddington Athletic**	**1–1** (**5–3** p)	Deveronvale	Haddington
15:00	McGarry 14'		Ballard 2'	Stadium: Millfield Park; Referee: Andy Gamble
	**Penalties**
	King (penalty scored); Auriemma (penalty scored); Hill (penalty scored); Russell (penalty scored); Watson (penalty scored)		Connelly (penalty scored); Robertson (penalty missed); Noble (penalty scored); Aitken (penalty scored)

28 September 2021	**Bo'ness United**	**4–1**	Wick Academy	Bo'ness
19:45	Wilson 11'; Anderson 46'; Locke 49'; Stevenson 85' (pen.)		Halliday 71' (pen.)	Stadium: Newtown Park; Referee: Colin Whyte

== Second round ==
The second round took place on the weekend of 23 October 2021. Along with the 30 winners from the first round, there were 10 new entries at this stage - all from League Two. The draw took place on 19 September 2021.

=== Draw ===
Teams in Italics were unknown at the time of the draw. Teams in bold advanced to the third round.

League Two	Highland League	Lowland League	East of Scotland League	West of Scotland League	Other
**Albion Rovers**; **Annan Athletic**; Cowdenbeath; **Edinburgh City**; Elgin City; **Forfar Athletic**; **Kelty Hearts**; **Stenhousemuir**; **Stirling Albion**; Stranraer	**Brechin City**; Brora Rangers; Buckie Thistle; Formartine United; Huntly; Nairn County; Rothes	Berwick Rangers; Bo'ness United; **Bonnyrigg Rose Athletic**; Broomhill; **Civil Service Strollers**; **Dalbeattie Star**; **East Kilbride**; East Stirlingshire; **Gala Fairydean Rovers**; University of Stirling	Premier Division: Dunbar United; Jeanfield Swifts; **Lothian Thistle Hutchison Vale**; **Sauchie Juniors**; **Tranent Juniors**; First Division: Dunipace; Haddington Athletic; Preston Athletic	Premier Division: **Auchinleck Talbot**; **Clydebank**; **Darvel**	North Superleague: **Banks O' Dee**; South of Scotland League: St Cuthbert Wanderers

=== Matches ===
23 October 2021	**Annan Athletic**	**3–1**	Jeanfield Swifts	Annan
15:00	Wallace 50' (pen.), 60'; Moxon 85'		McLeish 89'	Stadium: Galabank; Attendance: 395; Referee: Steven Reid

23 October 2021	**Banks O' Dee**	**5–0**	Nairn County	Aberdeen
15:00	Buglass 15'; Winton 23'; Philipson 29'; MacLeod 56', 59'			Stadium: Spain Park; Attendance: 196; Referee: Daniel Graves

23 October 2021	Berwick Rangers	**1–2**	**Stirling Albion**	Berwick-upon-Tweed, England
15:00	Denholm 33'		Mackin 25'; McGregor 90+2'	Stadium: Shielfield Park; Attendance: 519; Referee: Mike Roncone

23 October 2021	**Brechin City**	**2–1**	Haddington Athletic	Brechin
15:00	Denham 55'; Wade 90+1'		McGarry 22'	Stadium: Glebe Park; Attendance: 401; Referee: Alastair Grieve

23 October 2021	Broomhill	**0–2**	**Tranent Juniors**	Alloa
15:00			Rutherford 15'; Miller 83'	Stadium: Recreation Park; Attendance: 202; Referee: Michael McCart

23 October 2021	Brora Rangers	**0–0**	Albion Rovers	Brora
15:00				Stadium: Dudgeon Park; Referee: Iain Snedden

23 October 2021	Cowdenbeath	**2–4**	**Civil Service Strollers**	Cowdenbeath
15:00	Renton 13'; Buchanan 35'		Valentine 17'; Faye 38', 65'; Dukuray 76'	Stadium: Central Park; Attendance: 282; Referee: Jordan Curran

23 October 2021	Dalbeattie Star	**0–0**	Rothes	Dalbeattie
15:00				Stadium: Islecroft Stadium; Attendance: 210; Referee: Colin Whyte

23 October 2021	Dunbar United	**1–1**	Lothian Thistle Hutchison Vale	Dunbar
15:00	Devlin 72' (pen.)		Douglas 90'	Stadium: New Countess Park; Attendance: 858; Referee: Paul Timmons

23 October 2021	**East Kilbride**	**4–0**	University of Stirling	East Kilbride
15:00	McManus 23'; Malcolm 60'; Stainrod 83', 87'			Stadium: K-Park Training Academy; Attendance: 170; Referee: Ryan Kennedy

23 October 2021	East Stirlingshire	**0–3**	**Bonnyrigg Rose Athletic**	Falkirk
15:00			Young 8'; Barrett 23'; Hunter 77'	Stadium: Falkirk Stadium; Attendance: 421; Referee: Calum Haswell

23 October 2021	**Edinburgh City**	**2–1**	Bo'ness United	Edinburgh
15:00	Shanley 45'; Robertson 76'		Anderson 10'	Stadium: Ainslie Park; Attendance: 352; Referee: Alan Muir

23 October 2021	Formartine United	**0–2**	**Forfar Athletic**	Pitmedden
15:00			Shepherd 33' (pen.); Anderson 61'	Stadium: North Lodge Park; Referee: Calum Scott

23 October 2021	**Kelty Hearts**	**4–1**	Buckie Thistle	Kelty
15:00	O'Ware 34'; Cardle 36', 77'; Philp 86'		Urquhart 79'	Stadium: New Central Park; Attendance: 608; Referee: Steven Kirkland

23 October 2021	Preston Athletic	**0–2**	**Auchinleck Talbot**	Prestonpans
15:00			Glasgow 77'; Samson 82'	Stadium: Pennypit Park; Referee: Chris Gentles

23 October 2021	**Sauchie Juniors**	**2–1**	Dunipace	Sauchie
15:00	Smith 31' (pen.), 65' (pen.)		Grant 60'	Stadium: Beechwood Park; Attendance: 678; Referee: Stephen Gill

23 October 2021	**Stenhousemuir**	**4–1**	Huntly	Stenhousemuir
15:00	Brown 30', 71'; Orr 48'; Lyon 68'		MacIver 45'	Stadium: Ochilview Park; Attendance: 324; Referee: Connor Ashwood

23 October 2021	St Cuthbert Wanderers	**1–3**	**Gala Fairydean Rovers**	Kirkcudbright
15:00	Kelly 25'		Berry 39'; Murray 44' (pen.); Healy 71'	Stadium: St Mary's Park; Attendance: 250; Referee: Alex Shepherd

23 October 2021	Stranraer	**0–1**	**Darvel**	Stranraer
15:00			Allan 38'	Stadium: Stair Park; Attendance: 357; Referee: Greg Soutar

25 October 2021	**Clydebank**	**1–1**	**Elgin City**	Clydebank
19:45	Little 69' (pen.)		MacEwan 14'	Stadium: Holm Park; Attendance: 1,040; Referee: Matthew MacDermid

=== Replays ===
30 October 2021	**Albion Rovers**	**1–0**	Brora Rangers	Coatbridge
15:00	Wilson 83' (pen.)			Stadium: Cliftonhill; Attendance: 276; Referee: Iain Snedden

30 October 2021	Rothes	**0–1**	**Dalbeattie Star**	Rothes
15:00			Orsi 81'	Stadium: MacKessack Park; Attendance: 194; Referee: Colin Whyte

30 October 2021	**Lothian Thistle Hutchison Vale**	**2–1**	Dunbar United	Edinburgh
15:00	Cunningham 16' (pen.), 49'		Devlin 3'	Stadium: Ainslie Park; Referee: Chris Gentles

30 October 2021	Elgin City	**1–2**	**Clydebank**	Elgin
15:00	Cameron 79'		McGonigle 14'; Little 67'	Stadium: Borough Briggs; Attendance: 1,118; Referee: Matthew MacDermid

== Third round ==
The third round took place on the weekend of 27 November 2021. Along with the 20 winners from the second round, there were 20 new entries at this stage - from League One and the Championship. The draw took place on 24 October 2021 at 5:15pm live on the Scottish Cup YouTube, Facebook and Twitter pages.

=== Draw ===
Teams in Italics were unknown at the time of the draw. Teams in bold advanced to the fourth round.

Championship	League One	League Two	Tier 5	Tier 6
**Arbroath**; **Ayr United**; Dunfermline Athletic; **Greenock Morton**; Hamilton Academical; Inverness Caledonian Thistle; **Kilmarnock**; **Partick Thistle**; Queen of the South; **Raith Rovers**	**Airdrieonians**; **Alloa Athletic**; Clyde; **Cove Rangers**; **Dumbarton**; East Fife; Falkirk; Montrose; **Peterhead**; Queen's Park	Albion Rovers; **Annan Athletic**; **Edinburgh City**; Forfar Athletic; **Kelty Hearts**; Stenhousemuir; **Stirling Albion**	Highland League: Brechin City; Lowland League: Bonnyrigg Rose Athletic; Civil Service Strollers; Dalbeattie Star; **East Kilbride**; Gala Fairydean Rovers	East of Scotland Premier Division: Lothian Thistle Hutchison Vale; Sauchie Juniors; Tranent Juniors; West of Scotland Premier Division: **Auchinleck Talbot**; **Clydebank**; **Darvel**; North Superleague: **Banks O' Dee**

=== Matches ===
26 November 2021	**Partick Thistle**	**1–0**	Dunfermline Athletic	Glasgow
19:45	Docherty 82'			Stadium: Firhill Stadium; Attendance: 2,198; Referee: John Beaton

27 November 2021	Kelty Hearts	**0–0**	Montrose	Kelty
15:00				Stadium: New Central Park; Attendance: 805; Referee: Barry Cook

27 November 2021	**Dumbarton**	**3–1**	Sauchie Juniors	Dumbarton
15:00	Pignatiello 24'; McKee 90'; Schiavone 90+3'		Smith 58' (pen.)	Stadium: Dumbarton Football Stadium; Attendance: 571; Referee: Peter Stuart

27 November 2021	**Auchinleck Talbot**	**1–0**	Hamilton Academical	Auchinleck
15:00	G. Wilson 60'			Stadium: Beechwood Park; Attendance: 1,778; Referee: Matthew MacDermid

27 November 2021	Civil Service Strollers	**0–3**	**Peterhead**	Edinburgh
15:00			McLean 55' (pen.); S. Brown 59'; Cameron 90+3'	Stadium: Christie Gillies Park; Attendance: 180; Referee: Chris Graham

27 November 2021	Falkirk	**1–2**	**Raith Rovers**	Falkirk
15:00	Morrison 50'		Matthews 27'; Ross 84'	Stadium: Falkirk Stadium; Attendance: 2,512; Referee: Nick Walsh

27 November 2021	**Stirling Albion**	**4–0**	Tranent Juniors	Stirling
15:00	Mackin 20', 63' (pen.); Leitch 30'; McGregor 81'			Stadium: Forthbank Stadium; Attendance: 701; Referee: Lloyd Wilson

27 November 2021	**Clydebank**	**2–0**	Clyde	Clydebank
15:00	Darroch 44'; Little 64'			Stadium: Holm Park; Attendance: 1,040; Referee: Alan Newlands

27 November 2021	Dalbeattie Star	**1–2**	**East Kilbride**	Dalbeattie
15:00	Degnan 69'		McLaughlin 42' (pen.); Saunders 64'	Stadium: Islecroft Stadium; Attendance: 196; Referee: Iain Sneddon

27 November 2021	**Alloa Athletic**	**5–0**	Bonnyrigg Rose Athletic	Alloa
15:00	Niang 13', 90'; Henderson 20', 70', 83'			Stadium: Recreation Park; Attendance: 513; Referee: Calum Scott

27 November 2021	**Ayr United**	**2–1**	Albion Rovers	Ayr
15:00	Maxwell 54'; Moffat 65'		Wright 46'	Stadium: Somerset Park; Attendance: 986; Referee: Willie Collum

27 November 2021	Stenhousemuir	**0–2**	**Airdrieonians**	Stenhousemuir
15:00			Frizzell 37'; S. McGill 55'	Stadium: Ochilview Park; Attendance: 597; Referee: Steven Kirkland

27 November 2021	Queen's Park	**0–1**	**Kilmarnock**	Glasgow
15:00			E. Murray 45+1'	Stadium: Firhill Stadium; Attendance: 1,153; Referee: Grant Irvine

27 November 2021	Gala Fairydean Rovers	**0–1**	**Annan Athletic**	Galashiels
15:00			Smith 51'	Stadium: Netherdale; Attendance: 300; Referee: George Calder

27 November 2021	Inverness Caledonian Thistle	**1–1**	Greenock Morton	Inverness
15:00	Mackay 12'		Reilly 81'	Stadium: Caledonian Stadium; Attendance: 790; Referee: Colin Steven

27 November 2021	Lothian Thistle Hutchison Vale	**1–2**	**Edinburgh City**	Edinburgh
15:00	Douglas 82'		Handling 35'; Murray 42'	Stadium: Ainslie Park; Attendance: 216; Referee: Dan McFarlane

27 November 2021	**Banks O' Dee**	**2–1**	East Fife	Aberdeen
15:00	Newton 28' (o.g.); Gilmour 81'		Semple 13'	Stadium: Spain Park; Attendance: 328; Referee: Dan McFarlane

27 November 2021	Cove Rangers	**2–2**	Queen of the South	Aberdeen
15:00	Vigurs 33'; McAllister 90+1'		Soares Junior 32'; Paton 72'	Stadium: Balmoral Stadium; Attendance: 468; Referee: Scott Lambie

27 November 2021	**Arbroath**	**3–0**	Forfar Athletic	Arbroath
15:00	Thomson 12'; Little 20'; Donnelly 53'			Stadium: Gayfield Park; Attendance: 1,280; Referee: Mike Roncone

29 November 2021	Brechin City	**1–1**	Darvel	Brechin
19:45	Cox 56'		Kirkpatrick 32'	Stadium: Glebe Park; Attendance: 577; Referee: Graham Grainger

=== Replays ===
4 December 2021	Montrose	**1–1** (**1–3** p)	**Kelty Hearts**	Montrose
15:00	Johnston 42'		Cardle 6'	Stadium: Links Park; Attendance: 690; Referee: Barry Cook
	**Penalties**
	Steeves (penalty missed); Whatley (penalty missed); Johnston (penalty scored); Callaghan (penalty missed)		(penalty scored) Higginbotham; (penalty scored) Cardle; (penalty scored) Barjonas

7 December 2021	**Greenock Morton**	**1–1** (**5–4** p)	Inverness Caledonian Thistle	Greenock
19:45	Muirhead 42'		Devine 47'	Stadium: Cappielow; Attendance: 700; Referee: David Dickinson
	**Penalties**
	Reilly (penalty scored); Lyon (penalty scored); Ugwu (penalty scored); Muirhead (penalty scored); Oliver (penalty scored)		(penalty scored) Doran; (penalty scored) McAlear; (penalty scored) Allardice; (penalty scored) Jamieson; (penalty missed) Devine

7 December 2021	Queen of the South	**0–3**	**Cove Rangers**	Dumfries
19:45			Fyvie 38'; Megginson 80', 83'	Stadium: Palmerston Park; Attendance: 527; Referee: Scott Lambie

14 December 2021	**Darvel**	**2–2** (**5–4** p)	Brechin City	Darvel
19:45	Meggatt 45'; Thomson 80'		Inglis 38'; MacKintosh 88'	Stadium: Recreation Park; Attendance: 781; Referee: Graham Grainger
	**Penalties**
	Miller (penalty scored); McShane (penalty missed); Caldwell (penalty scored); Ferguson (penalty scored); Allan (penalty scored); Thomson (penalty scored)		(penalty scored) Inglis; (penalty missed) Wood; (penalty scored) MacKintosh; (penalty scored) Bain; (penalty scored) Kucheriavyi; (penalty missed) Milne

== Fourth round ==
The fourth round took place on the weekend of 22 January 2022. Along with the 20 winners from the third round, there were 12 new entries at this stage - from the Premiership. The draw took place on 29 November 2021 following the Brechin City v Darvel match live on BBC Scotland.

=== Draw ===
Teams in Italics were unknown at the time of the draw. Teams in bold advanced to the fifth round. Auchinleck Talbot were drawn against Premiership club Heart of Midlothian (58 places above them), representing the biggest league position gap between two teams in the competition's history since the pyramid system was introduced.

Premiership	Championship	League One	League Two	Other
**Aberdeen**; **Celtic**; **Dundee**; **Dundee United**; **Heart of Midlothian**; **Hibernian**; **Livingston**; **Motherwell**; **Rangers**; Ross County; St Johnstone; **St Mirren**	**Arbroath**; Ayr United; Greenock Morton; Kilmarnock; **Partick Thistle**; **Raith Rovers**	Airdrieonians; Alloa Athletic; Cove Rangers; Dumbarton; **Peterhead**	**Annan Athletic**; Edinburgh City; **Kelty Hearts**; Stirling Albion	Lowland League: East Kilbride; North Superleague: Banks O' Dee; West of Scotland Premier Division: Auchinleck Talbot; Clydebank; Darvel

=== Matches ===
20 January 2022	**Hibernian**	**1–0** (a.e.t.)	Cove Rangers	Edinburgh
19:45	Nisbet 112'			Stadium: Easter Road; Attendance: 5,849; Referee: Euan Anderson

21 January 2022	**Rangers**	**4–0**	Stirling Albion	Glasgow
19:45	Lowry 31'; Tavernier 37' (pen.); Itten 59'; Sakala 86'			Stadium: Ibrox Stadium; Attendance: 37,916; Referee: John Beaton

22 January 2022	Auchinleck Talbot	**0–5**	**Heart of Midlothian**	Auchinleck
12:30			Halliday 14'; Boyce 39' (pen.), 51'; Haring 80'; Cochrane 83'	Stadium: Beechwood Park; Attendance: 3,270; Referee: Greg Aitken

22 January 2022	**Peterhead**	**2–2** (a.e.t.) (**5–3** p)	East Kilbride	Peterhead
15:00	McLean 43'; McCarthy 45'		Victoria 11', 65'	Stadium: Balmoor Stadium; Attendance: 629; Referee: Chris Graham
	**Penalties**
	McDonald (penalty scored); McCarthy (penalty scored); Duncan (penalty scored); Lyle (penalty scored); McLean (penalty scored)		(penalty scored) McLaughlin; (penalty scored) Elliott; (penalty missed) Finlay; (penalty scored) McAninch

22 January 2022	Clydebank	**3–4** (a.e.t.)	**Annan Athletic**	Clydebank
15:00	McKinlay 45'; Black 68'; Mulcahy 94'		Moxon 9'; Douglas 54'; McCartney 119'; Anderson 120+3'	Stadium: Holm Park; Attendance: 1,200; Referee: Grant Irvine

22 January 2022	Banks O' Dee	**0–3**	**Raith Rovers**	Aberdeen
15:00			Stanton 67'; Poplatnik 90'; Connolly 90+3'	Stadium: Spain Park; Attendance: 870; Referee: Craig Napier

22 January 2022	**Motherwell**	**2–1** (a.e.t.)	Greenock Morton	Motherwell
15:00	Van Veen 111' (pen.); Donnelly 120+1'		Muirhead 105'	Stadium: Fir Park; Attendance: 4,735; Referee: Nick Walsh

22 January 2022	**Kelty Hearts**	**1–0** (a.e.t.)	St Johnstone	Kelty
15:00	Higginbotham 103'			Stadium: New Central Park; Attendance: 2,183; Referee: Kevin Clancy

22 January 2022	**Livingston**	**1–0**	Ross County	Livingston
15:00	Obileye 16' (pen.)			Stadium: Almondvale Stadium; Attendance: 1,227; Referee: Bobby Madden

22 January 2022	Dumbarton	**0–1**	**Dundee**	Dumbarton
15:00			Griffiths 63' (pen.)	Stadium: Dumbarton Football Stadium; Attendance: 1,198; Referee: Colin Steven

22 January 2022	**Aberdeen**	**3–0**	Edinburgh City	Aberdeen
15:00	Hedges 23'; Ramirez 44'; Ferguson 90+2'			Stadium: Pittodrie Stadium; Attendance: 9,019; Referee: Alan Muir

22 January 2022	Ayr United	**0–2**	**St Mirren**	Ayr
15:00			McAllister 7'; Kiltie 24'	Stadium: Somerset Park; Attendance: 3,423; Referee: David Dickinson

22 January 2022	Kilmarnock	**1–2** (a.e.t.)	**Dundee United**	Kilmarnock
15:00	McKenzie 20'		McNulty 4'; Levitt 111'	Stadium: Rugby Park; Attendance: 5,380; Referee: Willie Collum

22 January 2022	**Partick Thistle**	**1–0**	Airdrieonians	Glasgow
15:00	Graham 25'			Stadium: Firhill Stadium; Attendance: 2,895; Referee: David Munro

22 January 2022	**Arbroath**	**3–0**	Darvel	Arbroath
15:00	J. Hamilton 28', 68', 90'			Stadium: Gayfield Park; Attendance: 1,106; Referee: Matthew MacDermid

22 January 2022	Alloa Athletic	**1–2**	**Celtic**	Alloa
17:30	Sammon 78'		Giakoumakis 14'; Abada 45+1'	Stadium: Recreation Park; Attendance: 3,022; Referee: Don Robertson

== Fifth round ==
The fifth round took place on the weekend of 12 February 2022, featuring the 16 winners from the fourth round. The draw took place on 22 January 2022 following the Alloa Athletic v Celtic match live on Premier Sports 1. Teams in bold advanced to the quarter-finals.

=== Draw ===
Premiership	Championship	League One	League Two
Aberdeen; **Celtic**; **Dundee**; **Dundee United**; **Heart of Midlothian**; **Hibernian**; Livingston; **Motherwell**; **Rangers**; **St Mirren**	Arbroath; Partick Thistle; Raith Rovers	Peterhead	Annan Athletic; Kelty Hearts

=== Matches ===
12 February 2022	**Motherwell**	**2–1**	Aberdeen	Motherwell
15:00	Van Veen 34'; Shields 45'		Ramirez 3'	Stadium: Fir Park; Attendance: 5,892; Referee: Greg Aitken

12 February 2022	**Heart of Midlothian**	**0–0** (a.e.t.) (**4–3** p)	Livingston	Edinburgh
15:00				Stadium: Tynecastle Park; Attendance: 12,232; Referee: Nick Walsh
	**Penalties**
	Souttar (penalty scored); Haring (penalty scored); Woodburn (penalty scored); Simms (penalty scored)		(penalty scored) Shinnie; (penalty scored) Kelly; (penalty scored) Holt; (penalty missed) Montaño; (penalty missed) Obileye

12 February 2022	Partick Thistle	**0–1**	**Dundee United**	Glasgow
15:00			Harkes 34'	Stadium: Firhill Stadium; Attendance: 4,632; Referee: John Beaton

12 February 2022	**St Mirren**	**4–0**	Kelty Hearts	Paisley
15:00	Greive 15'; Jones 50'; Kiltie 58', 85'			Stadium: St Mirren Park; Attendance: 3,398; Referee: Andrew Dallas

12 February 2022	Annan Athletic	**0–3**	**Rangers**	Annan
17:30			Helander 7'; Roofe 22'; Sakala 32'	Stadium: Galabank; Attendance: 2,500; Referee: Alan Muir

13 February 2022	Arbroath	**1–3**	**Hibernian**	Arbroath
12:30	Wighton 6'		Mitchell 20'; Nisbet 71'; Mueller 87'	Stadium: Gayfield Park; Attendance: 4,049; Referee: Willie Collum

13 February 2022	**Celtic**	**4–0**	Raith Rovers	Glasgow
16:00	Scales 22'; Giakoumakis 68'; Maeda 71'; Bitton 88'			Stadium: Celtic Park; Referee: Steven McLean

14 February 2022	Peterhead	**0–3**	**Dundee**	Peterhead
19:45			Adam 31' (pen.); McGinn 54'; Mulligan 89'	Stadium: Balmoor Stadium; Attendance: 1,598; Referee: David Munro

== Quarter-finals ==
The quarter-finals took place on the weekend of 12 March 2022. The draw took place on 14 February 2022 following the Peterhead v Dundee match live on BBC Scotland with guest Paul Slane.

=== Draw ===
Teams in Bold advanced to the semi-finals.

Premiership
- **Celtic**
- Dundee
- Dundee United
- **Heart of Midlothian**
- **Hibernian**
- Motherwell
- **Rangers**
- St Mirren

=== Matches ===
12 March 2022	**Heart of Midlothian**	**4–2**	St Mirren	Edinburgh
19:45	Baningime 16'; Haring 29'; McEneff 67'; Simms 85'		Brophy 36'; Ronan 62'	Stadium: Tynecastle Park; Attendance: 13,899; Referee: Bobby Madden

13 March 2022	Motherwell	**1–2**	**Hibernian**	Motherwell
12:30	Efford 43'		Melkersen 15', 37'	Stadium: Fir Park; Attendance: 8,126; Referee: Willie Collum

13 March 2022	Dundee	**0–3**	**Rangers**	Dundee
16:00			Goldson 9'; Tavernier 25' (pen.); Sakala 87'	Stadium: Dens Park; Attendance: 5,536; Referee: Steven McLean

14 March 2022	Dundee United	**0–3**	**Celtic**	Dundee
19:45			McGregor 12'; Giakoumakis 58', 88'	Stadium: Tannadice Park; Attendance: 8,553; Referee: John Beaton

== Semi-finals ==
The semi-finals took place on the weekend of 16 April 2022. The draw took place on 14 March 2022 following the Dundee United v Celtic match live on Premier Sports 1 with guest Greg Hemphill.

The semi-finalists were Celtic, Hearts, Hibernian and Rangers, the first time in the competition's history (its 122nd edition since Celtic were founded in 1888) that this combination of teams made up the last four.

=== Draw ===
Premiership
- Celtic
- Heart of Midlothian
- Hibernian
- Rangers

=== Matches ===
16 April 2022	Heart of Midlothian	2–1	Hibernian	Glasgow
12:15	Simms 16'; Kingsley 21'		Cadden 22'	Stadium: Hampden Park; Attendance: 37,783; Referee: John Beaton

17 April 2022	Celtic	1–2 (a.e.t.)	Rangers	Glasgow
14:00	Taylor 64'		Arfield 78'; Starfelt 114' (o.g.)	Stadium: Hampden Park; Attendance: 50,072; Referee: Bobby Madden

== Final ==
21 May 2022
15:00

Rangers	2–0 (a.e.t.)	Heart of Midlothian
Jack 94'; Wright 97'	Report

Hampden Park, Glasgow
Attendance: 50,319
Referee: Willie Collum

== Broadcasting ==
The Scottish Cup was broadcast by Premier Sports and BBC Scotland. Premier Sports had the first two picks of the fourth and fifth rounds, the quarter-finals as well as first pick of one semi-final and aired the final non-exclusively. BBC Scotland broadcast one match per round from the first round onwards and two matches per round from the fourth round to the quarter-finals, as well as one semi-final and the final.

The following matches were broadcast live on UK television:

Round	BBC Scotland	Premier Sports
First round	Berwick Rangers v Gretna F.C. 2008	
Second round	Clydebank v Elgin City	
Third round	Brechin City v Darvel	
Fourth round	Hibernian v Cove Rangers; Auchinleck Talbot v Heart of Midlothian	Rangers v Stirling Albion; Alloa Athletic v Celtic
Fifth round	Arbroath v Hibernian; Peterhead v Dundee	Annan Athletic v Rangers; Celtic v Raith Rovers
Quarter-finals	Heart of Midlothian v St Mirren; Motherwell v Hibernian	Dundee v Rangers; Dundee United v Celtic
Semi-finals	Heart of Midlothian v Hibernian	Heart of Midlothian v Hibernian; Celtic v Rangers
Final	Rangers v Heart of Midlothian	
