= List of Annan Athletic F.C. seasons =

This is a list of Annan Athletic Football Club seasons from 1945 to 1946, when Annan Athletic became a founding member of the Dumfries & District Amateur Junior League, to the present day. The list details Annan's record in league and cup competitions, and the club's top league goal scorer of each season.

The club was founded in 1942 and first competed in the Dumfries and District Youth League during the Second World War. In 1945 the club joined the Dumfries and District Junior League. From 1952 to 1977 Annan competed in the Carlisle and District League in England before returning to Scottish football in the South of Scotland Football League. In 2008, following the demise of local rivals Gretna, the club applied to play in the Scottish Football League and were successful. Annan's largest success since joining the Scottish Football League is reaching the semi-finals of the Scottish Challenge Cup on three separate occasions in 2009–10, 2011–12 and 2013–14. The club also reached the Second Division play-off final in 2010–11 losing 4–3 on aggregate to Albion Rovers and the League One play-off final in 2018–19 to Clyde.

== Seasons ==
This list is incomplete; you can help by adding missing items with reliable sources.

Season	League									Scottish Cup	SoS League Cup EoS League Cup Scottish League Cup	Challenge Cup	Other	Top league goalscorer	
Season	Division	P	W	D	L	F	A	Pts	Pos	Scottish Cup	SoS League Cup EoS League Cup Scottish League Cup	Challenge Cup	Other	Name	Goals
1945–46	Dumfries & District Amateur Junior League								2nd	–	N/A	N/A			
1946–47	Dumfries & District Amateur Junior League	24	18	2	4	107	46	38	1st	–	N/A	N/A			
1947–48	Dumfries & District Amateur Junior League	18	15	1	2	81	25	31	1st	–	N/A	N/A			
1948–49	Dumfries & District Amateur Junior League	15	10	3	2	62	26	23	3rd	–	N/A	N/A			
1949–50	Dumfries & District Amateur Junior League	18	14	1	3	75	29	29	1st	–	N/A	N/A			
195051	Dumfries & District Amateur Junior League	12	9	0	3	54	18	18	1st	–	N/A	N/A			
1951–52	–									–	N/A	N/A		–	
1952–53	Carlisle and District League								1st	–	N/A	N/A	Cumberland Senior Cup Winners		
1953–54	Carlisle and District League									–	N/A	N/A			
1954–55	Carlisle and District League									–	N/A	N/A	Cumberland Senior Cup Runners-up		
1955–56	Carlisle and District League									–	N/A	N/A			
1956–57	Carlisle and District League									–	N/A	N/A			
1957–58	Carlisle and District League									–	N/A	N/A			
1958–59	Carlisle and District League									–	N/A	N/A			
1959–60	Carlisle and District League									–	N/A	N/A			
1960–61	Carlisle and District League									–	N/A	N/A			
1961–62	Carlisle and District League									–	N/A	N/A			
1962–63	Carlisle and District League									–	N/A	N/A			
1963–64	Carlisle and District League									–	N/A	N/A			
1964–65	Carlisle and District League									–	N/A	N/A			
1965–66	Carlisle and District League									–	N/A	N/A			
1966–67	Carlisle and District League									–	N/A	N/A			
1967–68	Carlisle and District League									–	N/A	N/A			
1968–69	Carlisle and District League									–	N/A	N/A	Cumberland Senior Cup Winners		
1969–70	Carlisle and District League									–	N/A	N/A			
1970–71	Carlisle and District League									–	N/A	N/A			
1971–72	Carlisle and District League									–	N/A	N/A	Cumberland Senior Cup Winners		
1972–73	Carlisle and District League									–	N/A	N/A			
1973–74	Carlisle and District League									–	N/A	N/A			
1974–75	Carlisle and District League									–	N/A	N/A			
1975–76	Carlisle and District League									–	N/A	N/A			
1976–77	Carlisle and District League									–	N/A	N/A			
1977–78	SoS League	18	9	3	6	54	39	21	5th	–		N/A			
1978–79	SoS League	18	11	1	6	44	34	23	4th	–		N/A			
1979–80	SoS League	19	12	1	6			25	3rd	R1		N/A			
1980–81	SoS League	18	12	2	4	52	28	26	3rd	–		N/A			
1981–82	SoS League	18	13	2	3	65	22	28	2nd	–		N/A	Detroit Trophy Winners (shared)		
1982–83	SoS League	18	11	3	4	61	38	25	3rd	–	W	N/A	Cree Lodge Cup Winners		
1983–84	SoS League	18	13	4	1	74	23	30	1st	–		N/A	Haig Gordon Memorial Trophy Winners Detroit Trophy Winners (shared) Tweedie Cup Winners		
1984–85	SoS League	18	12	1	5	60	17	25	2nd	–	W	N/A			
1985–86	SoS League	18	9	8	1	49	23	26	4th	–		N/A	Haig Gordon Memorial Trophy Winners		
1986–87	SoS League	18	15	0	3	73	18	30	1st	R1		N/A	Detroit Trophy Winners		
1987–88	EoS League First Division	18	12	5	1	57	33	29	1st ↑	–		N/A	N/A		
1988–89	EoS League Premier Division	18	5	4	9	29	35	14	8th	R2		N/A	N/A		
1989–90	EoS League Premier Division	18	11	5	2	38	24	27	1st	–		N/A	N/A		
1990–91	EoS League Premier Division	18	5	5	8	35	45	15	7th	–		–	N/A		
1991–92	EoS League Premier Division	16	1	3	12	17	43	5	9th↓	–		–	N/A		
1992–93	EoS League First Division	18	12	2	4	38	27	26	2nd	–		–	N/A		
1993–94	EoS League Premier Division	18	7	5	6	31	34	19	5th	–		–	N/A		
1994–95	EoS League Premier Division	18	10	1	7	34	29	21	3rd	–		–	N/A		
1995–96	EoS League Premier Division	18	9	6	3	41	30	33	3rd	R2		–	N/A		
1996–97	EoS League Premier Division	18	7	4	7	31	29	25	5th	–		–	N/A		
1997–98	EoS League Premier Division	18	8	4	6	44	28	28	4th	R3		–	N/A		
1998–99	EoS League Premier Division	18	11	4	3	39	26	37	3rd	–		–	N/A		
1999–2000	EoS League Premier Division	22	15	6	1	62	21	51	1st	R3	W	–	N/A		
2000–01	EoS League Premier Division	22	13	6	3	48	26	45	1st	–		–	N/A		
2001–02	EoS League Premier Division	22	11	3	8	53	40	36	3rd	–		–	N/A		
2002–03	EoS League Premier Division	22	14	2	6	59	32	44	2nd	–		–	N/A		
2003–04	EoS League Premier Division	22	11	4	7	49	45	37	4th	–		–	N/A		
2004–05	EoS League Premier Division	20	15	1	4	66	29	46	2nd	–		–	N/A		
2005–06	EoS League Premier Division	22	11	4	7	37	31	37	6th	–		–	N/A		
2006–07	EoS League Premier Division	22	17	3	2	64	18	54	1st	R2		–	Scottish Qualifying Cup (South) Winners		
2007–08	EoS League Premier Division	22	7	7	8	40	33	28	7th	R2		–	South Region Challenge Cup Winners		
2008–09	SFL 3	36	14	8	14	56	45	50	7th	R2	R1	R1	N/A	Mike Jack	15
2009–10	SFL 3	36	11	10	15	41	42	43	8th	R2	R1	SF	N/A	Graeme Bell	9
2010–11	SFL 3	36	16	11	9	58	45	59	4th	R3	R1	R1	N/A	Ian Harty	14
2011–12	SFL 3	36	13	10	13	53	53	49	6th	R3	R1	SF	N/A	Scott Gibson; Aaron Muirhead; Sean O'Connor	7
2012–13	SFL 3	36	11	10	15	54	65	43	8th	R2	R1	R2	N/A	Ally Love	12
2013–14	SPFL L2	36	19	6	11	69	49	63	2nd	R3	R1	SF	N/A	Kenneth Mackay	13
2014–15	SPFL L2	36	14	8	14	56	56	50	5th	R4	R1	R1	N/A	Peter Weatherson	21
2015–16	SPFL L2	36	16	8	12	69	57	56	5th	R5	R1	R2	N/A	Peter Weatherson	16
2016–17	SPFL L2	36	18	4	14	61	58	58	3rd	R3	Group	R1	N/A	David McKenna	11
2017–18	SPFL L2	36	12	11	13	49	41	47	7th	R2	Group	R2	N/A	Blair Henderson	16
2018–19	SPFL L2	36	20	6	10	70	39	66	4th	R3	Group	R2	N/A	Tommy Muir; Tony Wallace	12
2019–20	SPFL L2	27	9	4	14	33	54	31	7th (Note: The 2019–20 Scottish League Two was curtailed due to the COVID-19 pandemic, with league positions, promotions and relegations decided on a points-per-game basis.)	R3	Group	R2	N/A	Tommy Muir	7
2020–21	SPFL L2	22	5	7	10	25	27	22	8th	R2	Group	N/A	N/A	Tony Wallace	5
2021–22	SPFL L2	36	18	5	13	64	51	59	3rd	R5	Group	R1	N/A	Tony Wallace	13
2022–23	SPFL L2	36	14	9	13	61	51	51	3rd	R2	R2	R3	N/A	Tommy Goss	23
2023–24	SPFL L1	36	9	12	15	55	68	39	8th	R3	Group	R3	N/A	Aidan Smith	11
2024–25	SPFL L1	36	10	6	20	41	68	36	9th	R3	Group	R4	N/A	Tommy Muir	10
2025–26	SPFL L2												N/A		

== Key ==
Key to divisions

- SoS League = South of Scotland League
- EoS League = East of Scotland League
- SFL 3 = Scottish Third Division
- SPFL L2 = Scottish League Two
- SPFL L1 = Scottish League One

Key to positions and symbols

- 1st – Champions
- 2nd – Runners-up
- 3rd – 3rd place
- ↑ – Promoted
- ↓ – Relegated

Key to rounds

- GS – Group stage
- R1 – Round 1, etc.
- QF – Quarter-finals
- SF – Semi-finals
- RU – Runners-up
- W – Winners
