= 2010–11 Queen of the South F.C. season =

Queen of the South
2010–11 season
- Chairman: Davie Rae
- Manager: Kenny Brannigan
- Stadium: Palmerston Park
- First Division: 4th
- Scottish Cup: Fourth round
- League Cup: Third round
- Challenge Cup: Runners-Up
- Top goalscorer: League: Colin McMenamin (10); All: Colin McMenamin (11)
- Highest home attendance: League: 2,254 vs. Falkirk; Cup: 1,751 vs. East Fife
- Lowest home attendance: League: 956 vs. Morton; Cup: 981 vs. Forfar Athletic
- Average home league attendance: League: 1,702

The 2010–11 season was Queen of the South's ninth consecutive season in the Scottish First Division, having been promoted from the Scottish Second Division at the end of the 2001–02 season. Queens also competed in the Challenge Cup, League Cup and the Scottish Cup.

== First team transfers ==
- From end of 2009–10 season, to last match of season 2010–11

=== In ===
Player	From	League	Fee
(Scotland) Allan Johnston	Free agent		Free (July 2010)
(Scotland) Ryan Conroy	Celtic	SPL	Loan (August 2010)
(Scotland) Colin McMenamin	Free agent		Free (November 2010)

=== Out ===
Player	To	League	Fee
(Scotland) Ryan Conroy	Celtic	SPL	Loan Return (December 2010)

== Squad (that played for first team) ==
Note: Flags indicate national team as defined under FIFA eligibility rules; some limited exceptions apply. Players may hold more than one non-FIFA nationality.

No.	Pos.	Nation	Player
—	GK	(Scotland) SCO	David Hutton
—	GK	(Scotland) SCO	Ross Hyslop
—	GK	(Scotland) SCO	Roddy McKenzie
—	DF	(Scotland) SCO	Steven Black
—	DF	(Scotland) SCO	Robert Harris
—	DF	(Scotland) SCO	David Lilley (Captain)
—	DF	(Scotland) SCO	Ryan McGuffie
—	DF	(Scotland) SCO	Craig Reid
—	MF	(Scotland) SCO	Paul Burns

No.	Pos.	Nation	Player
—	FW	(Scotland) SCO	Daniel Carmichael
—	MF	(Scotland) SCO	Allan Johnston
—	MF	(Scotland) SCO	Stephen McKenna
—	MF	(Scotland) SCO	Willie McLaren
—	MF	(Scotland) SCO	Dan Orsi
—	MF	(Scotland) SCO	Rocco Quinn
—	MF	(Scotland) SCO	Neil Scally
—	FW	(Scotland) SCO	Derek Holmes
—	FW	(Scotland) SCO	Colin McMenamin
—	FW	(Scotland) SCO	David Weatherston

== Fixtures and results ==
Win Draw Loss Upcoming fixture

=== Friendlies ===
Date	Opponents	Stadium	Result F–A	Scorer(s)	Attendance
5 July 2010	Gretna 2008	Raydale Park	2–3	Reilly 11', Holmes 58'	504
7 July 2010	Annan Athletic	Palmerston Park	4–1	Holmes 31' pen., McLaren 37', Degnan 68', Reilly 82'	332
10 July 2010	Dungannon Swifts	Stangmore Park	3–1	Quinn 24', Weatherston 48', McLaren 88'	
18 July 2010 (Jim Thomson Testimonial)	Rangers	Palmerston Park	0–1		2,708
20 July 2010	Hamilton Academical	Palmerston Park	0–0		560

=== Irn-Bru Scottish Football League First Division ===
Date	Opponents	Stadium	Result F–A	Scorer(s)	Attendance	Referee
7 August 2010	Dundee	Dens Park	0–1		4,644	Stevie O'Reilly
14 August 2010	Raith Rovers	Palmerston Park	1–3	Carmichael 45'	1,961	Steven McLean
22 August 2010	Cowdenbeath	Central Park	3–1	Burns 3', Holmes 54', McGuffie 86'	672	David Somers
28 August 2010	Ross County	Palmerston Park	3–0	Quinn 2', Conroy 22', McLaren 89'	1,644	Crawford Allan
11 September 2010	Falkirk	Falkirk Stadium	1–3	Burns 66'	4,064	John McKendrick
18 September 2010	Partick Thistle	Palmerston Park	2–1	Johnston 76', Quinn 87'	2,013	Stephen Finnie
25 September 2010	Stirling Albion	Forthbank Stadium	0–0		945	Neil Watters
2 October 2010	Dunfermline Athletic	Palmerston Park	2–0	Dowie 52' o.g., McLaren 63'	2,139	George Salmond
16 October 2010	Morton	Cappielow Park	0–2		1,777	Calum Murray
23 October 2010	Falkirk	Palmerston Park	1–5	Burns 49'	2,254	Charlie Richmond
30 October 2010	Ross County	Victoria Park	1–1	McMenamin (trialist) 16'	2,186	Brian Colvin
6 November 2010	Raith Rovers	Stark's Park	1–0	Conroy 75'	2,108	Steven McLean
13 November 2010	Cowdenbeath	Palmerston Park	3–0	Burns 20', Conroy 34', McLaren 80'	1,782	Steve Conroy
11 December 2010	Dunfermline Athletic	East End Park	0–1		2,062	Stevie O'Reilly
15 January 2011	Falkirk	Falkirk Stadium	3–0	Johnston 28', 43', McMenamin 39'	3,376	George Salmond
5 February 2011	Dundee	Palmerston Park	1–2	McGuffie 60'	2,006	Stephen Finnie
12 February 2011	Partick Thistle	Palmerston Park	3–3	McLaren 43', 87', Johnston 90'	1,860	Crawford Allan
19 February 2011	Morton	Cappielow Park	4–0	McLaren 1' pen., Weatherston 32', 63', 76'	1,754	Frank McDermott
22 February 2011	Stirling Albion	Palmerston Park	2–2	McMenamin 50', McGuffie 69'	1,185	Calum Murray
26 February 2011	Dunfermline Athletic	Palmerston Park	1–3	McMenamin 68'	2,052	Stevie O'Reilly
1 March 2011	Cowdenbeath	Central Park	2–2	Weatherston 17', McMenamin 84'	670	Crawford Allan
5 March 2011	Raith Rovers	Palmerston Park	0–2		1,754	Charlie Richmond
8 March 2011	Partick Thistle	Firhill Stadium	1–3	Carmichael 86'	1,001	Thomas Robertson
12 March 2011	Dundee	Dens Park	1–2	McMenamin 34'	4,242	Craig Thomson
16 March 2011	Morton	Palmerston Park	2–0	McMenamin 15', McLaren 24'	956	Steven McLean
19 March 2011	Ross County	Victoria Park	2–1	Harris 26' pen., Weatherston 44'	2,181	Brian Colvin
22 March 2011	Falkirk	Palmerston Park	0–1		1,270	Steven Nicholls
26 March 2011	Stirling Albion	Palmerston Park	4–1	McLaren 23' pen., 36', McMenamin 54', 77'	1,392	John McKendrick
29 March 2011	Stirling Albion	Forthbank Stadium	2–0	Orsi 3', Lilley 45'	444	Brian Winter
2 April 2011	Partick Thistle	Firhill Stadium	0–0		1,806	Crawford Allan
13 April 2011	Morton	Palmerston Park	1–4	Degnan 71'	966	Anthony Law
16 April 2011	Dunfermline Athletic	East End Park	1–6	Harris 62'	3,255	Alan Muir
23 April 2011	Cowdenbeath	Palmerston Park	2–2	Carmichael 17', Holmes 45'	1,102	Craig Charleston
26 April 2011	Ross County	Forthbank Stadium	0–1		266	Eddie Smith
30 April 2011	Raith Rovers	Stark's Park	1–0	Degnan 90'	2,001	John McKendrick
7 May 2011	Dundee	Palmerston Park	3–0	Johnston 18', Burns 24', 61'	2,590	Alan Muir

=== Active Nation Scottish Cup ===
Date	Round	Opponents	Stadium	Result F–A	Scorer(s)	Attendance	Referee
11 January 2011	Round 4	Brechin City	Palmerston Park	1–2	McMenamin 66'	1,169	Steven Nicholls

=== League Cup ===
Date	Round	Opponents	Stadium	Result F–A	Scorer(s)	Attendance	Referee
31 July 2010	Round 1	Dumbarton	Palmerston Park	5–1	Holmes 18', 28' pen., Johnston 56', Quinn 78', Reilly 89'	1,329	Brian Winter
25 August 2010	Round 2	Forfar Athletic	Palmerston Park	4–1	McLaren 17', Harris 22' pen., Weatherston 62', Carmichael 76'	981	Steven Nicholls
21 September 2010	Round 3	St Johnstone	McDiarmid Park	0–3		1,624	Alan Muir

=== Challenge Cup ===
Date	Round	Opponents	Stadium	Result F–A	Scorer(s)	Attendance	Referee
24 July 2010	Round 1	Albion Rovers	Palmerston Park	2–1	McGuffie 18', Burns 73'	1,115	George Salmond
10 August 2010	Round 2	Dunfermline Athletic	East End Park	1–1 (6–5 p)	Weatherston 53'	1,160	John McKendrick
4 September 2010	Round 3	East Fife	Palmerston Park	5–0	Burns 32', 47', 79', Ovenstone 64' o.g., Harris 90'	1,751	Charlie Richmond
9 October 2010	Round 4	Peterhead	Balmoor Stadium	2–1	Reid 65', Holmes 66'	1,003	Mike Tumilty
10 April 2011	Final	Ross County	McDiarmid Park	0–2		5,124	Euan Norris

== League table ==
Pos	Team	Pld	W	D	L	GF	GA	GD	Pts
2	Raith Rovers	36	17	9	10	47	35	+12	60
3	Falkirk	36	17	7	12	57	41	+16	58
4	Queen of the South	36	14	7	15	54	53	+1	49
5	Partick Thistle	36	12	11	13	44	39	+5	47
6	Dundee	36	19	12	5	54	34	+20	44 (Note: Dundee were docked 25 points for entering administration. The deduction was temporarily lifted pending an appeal by the club, however the appeal failed and the deduction was reinstated.)

Source: SPFL
Rules for classification: 1) points; 2) goal difference; 3) number of goals scored.
