= Ian McShane (footballer) =

Scottish footballer

Personal information
- Date of birth: 20 December 1992 (age 33)
- Place of birth: Bellshill, Scotland
- Height: 1.75 m (5 ft 9 in)
- Position: Midfielder

Team information
- Current team: Johnstone Burgh

Youth career
- Queen of the South

Senior career*
| Years | Team | Apps | (Gls) |
| 2010–2015 | Queen of the South | 78 | (5) |
| 2015–2017 | Ross County | 26 | (3) |
| 2017–2019 | St Mirren | 39 | (5) |
| 2019–2020 | Falkirk | 30 | (3) |
| 2020–2023 | Darvel | | |
| 2023–2024 | Gartcairn Juniors | | |
| 2024–2025 | East Kilbride | 14 | (0) |
| 2025– | Johnstone Burgh | 38 | (5) |
- * Club domestic league appearances and goals as of 29 November 2025 (UTC)

Ian McShane (born 20 December 1992) is a Scottish professional footballer who plays as a midfielder for Johnstone Burgh FC in the West of Scotland Football League, having previously played for Queen of the South, Ross County, St Mirren and Falkirk. McShane is the younger cousin of former Hamilton Academical player John McShane and is a minority shareholder in MacIntyre Sheds of Beauly.

== Career ==
=== Queen of the South ===
McShane is a product of the youth policy of Dumfries club Queen of the South. McShane figured in the 2010 pre-season set up for Queens before being formally announced on the club website on 25 July 2010 as having officially signed a senior player's contract along with fellow youth team players Dan Orsi, Steven Degnan and Gavin Reilly. McShane debuted for Queens in a 5–0 Scottish Challenge Cup victory versus East Fife on 4 September 2010. McShane's league debut was on 15 January 2011, as a 90th-minute substitute in the 3–0 away win versus Falkirk.

=== Ross County ===
On 25 May 2015, McShane signed for Ross County on a three-year contract. McShane made his debut on 1 August 2015, in a 2–0 defeat versus Celtic. McShane scored his first two goals for County in a 3–2 loss to Aberdeen, a low-driven freekick and a long range effort. It was announced on 23 May 2017 that McShane had been instructed by the Staggies to find another club.

=== St Mirren ===
On 13 July 2017, McShane signed for Scottish Championship club St Mirren on a two-year contract.

=== Falkirk ===
McShane signed for Falkirk in January 2019 on an 18-month contract. McShane played regularly for the Bairns, starting sixteen competitive first-team matches and scored three goals. Falkirk were relegated on the last game of the season, finishing bottom of the table.

=== Darvel ===
In June 2020 McShane made the switch to Scottish Junior club Darvel.

=== Gartcairn Juniors ===
On October 27, 2023, Darvel FC confirmed that McShane was leaving the club to join West of Scotland Football League club Gartcairn Juniors

== Career statistics ==
As of match played 12 November 2019

Appearances and goals by club, season and competition
| Club | Season | League | | | Scottish Cup | | League Cup | | Other | | Total | |
| Club | Season | Division | Apps | Goals | Apps | Goals | Apps | Goals | Apps | Goals | Apps | Goals |
|---|---|---|---|---|---|---|---|---|---|---|---|---|
| Queen of the South | 2010–11 | First Division | 13 | 0 | 0 | 0 | 0 | 0 | 1 (Note: Appearances in the Scottish Challenge Cup) | 0 | 14 | 0 |
| Queen of the South | 2011–12 | First Division | 4 | 0 | 0 | 0 | 1 | 0 | 0 | 0 | 5 | 0 |
| Queen of the South | 2012–13 | Second Division | 0 | 0 | 1 | 0 | 1 | 0 | 0 | 0 | 2 | 0 |
| Queen of the South | 2013–14 | Championship | 28 | 3 | 3 | 0 | 2 | 0 | 5 (Note: Three appearances in the Scottish Challenge Cup and two in the Premiership play-offs) | 0 | 38 | 3 |
| Queen of the South | 2014–15 | Championship | 33 | 2 | 3 | 0 | 2 | 0 | 3 (Note: One appearance in the Scottish Challenge Cup and two in the Premiership play-offs) | 0 | 41 | 2 |
| Queen of the South | Total | | 78 | 5 | 7 | 0 | 6 | 0 | 9 | 0 | 100 | 5 |
| Ross County | 2015–16 | Premiership | 18 | 3 | 4 | 0 | 4 | 0 | 0 | 0 | 26 | 3 |
| Ross County | 2016–17 | Premiership | 8 | 0 | 0 | 0 | 3 | 0 | 0 | 0 | 11 | 0 |
| Ross County | Total | | 26 | 3 | 4 | 0 | 7 | 0 | 0 | 0 | 37 | 3 |
| St Mirren | 2017–18 | Championship | 31 | 5 | 2 | 0 | 4 | 0 | 3 | 0 | 40 | 5 |
| St Mirren | 2018–19 | Premiership | 8 | 0 | 0 | 0 | 1 | 0 | 0 | 0 | 9 | 0 |
| St Mirren | Total | | 39 | 5 | 2 | 0 | 5 | 0 | 3 | 0 | 49 | 5 |
| Falkirk | 2018–19 | Championship | 16 | 3 | 0 | 0 | 0 | 0 | 0 | 0 | 16 | 3 |
| Falkirk | 2019–20 | League One | 9 | 0 | 0 | 0 | 4 | 0 | 2 | 0 | 15 | 0 |
| Falkirk | Total | | 25 | 3 | 0 | 0 | 4 | 0 | 2 | 0 | 31 | 3 |
| Career total | | | 168 | 16 | 13 | 0 | 22 | 0 | 12 | 0 | 217 | 16 |

== Honours ==
=== Club ===
Ross County

- Scottish League Cup: 2015–16
