= Ryan Smillie =

Scottish footballer

Personal information
- Date of birth: 30 May 1992 (age 34)
- Place of birth: Bellshill, Scotland
- Position: Striker

Team information
- Current team: Petershill

Youth career
- –2010: Queen of the South

Senior career*
Years	Team	Apps	(Gls)
2010–2011	Queen of the South	13	(0)
2012–2013	Kilbirnie Ladeside		
2013–	Petershill		
- * Club domestic league appearances and goals as of 19:30, 1 September 2013 (UTC)

Ryan Smillie (born 30 May 1992) is a Scottish professional footballer who plays as a striker for Petershill in the Scottish Junior Football Association, West Region. He has previously played in the Scottish Football League First Division for Queen of the South.

== Club career ==
Smillie came through the youth system at Queen of the South. He was promoted from the under-19s to the first team in August 2010 after agreeing a full-time contract with the club. His current contract, which expires at the end of May 2012, is supported by an apprenticeship scheme.

He was first included in the matchday squad in the 2010–11 season, in a September 2010 league match away to Stirling Albion. On that occasion he was an unused substitute. He made his first league appearance towards the end of the season, as a second-half substitute in a 1–0 win away to Raith Rovers in April 2011. He went on to make a further four Scottish First Division appearances for the season. He was an unused substitute in the final of the 2010–11 Scottish Challenge Cup, in which Queen of the South were defeated 2–0 by Ross County.

Smillie continued to make a contribution to the first team in the 2011–12 season. He played in Queen of the South's first league match of the season against Livingston in a 2–2 draw and in their first 2011–12 Scottish League Cup fixture against Stranraer in a 2–1 victory.

Smillie signed for Junior side Kilbirnie Ladeside on 10 July 2012 before moving to Petershill in August 2013.
