= Craig Reid (footballer, born 1986) =

Scottish footballer

Personal information
- Date of birth: 26 February 1986 (age 40)
- Place of birth: Irvine, Scotland
- Positions: Right back; centre-back

Team information
- Current team: Ardrossan Winton Rovers F.C.

Youth career
- Ardrossan Winton Rovers
- 2002–2007: Celtic

Senior career*
Years	Team	Apps	(Gls)
2007–2008	Celtic	0	(0)
2007–2008	→ Stirling Albion (loan)	13	(0)
2008–2012	Queen of the South	113	(1)
2012–2014	Greenock Morton	48	(0)
2014–2016	Motherwell	34	(1)
2015–2016	→ St Mirren (loan)	6	(0)
2016	Dunfermline Athletic	12	(0)
2016	Keflavík	11	(0)
2017	Peterhead	11	(1)
2017–2018	Ayr United	30	(0)
2018–2020	East Kilbride	48	(9)
2020–2021	Kelty Hearts	30	(0)
2021	Stenhousemuir	1	(0)
2021–2022	Darvel	20	(1)
2022-2024	Hurlford United	38	(1)

International career
- Scotland U17
- Scotland U18
- Scotland U19
- * Club domestic league appearances and goals as of 13:00, 2 June 2021 (UTC)

Craig Reid (born 26 February 1986) is a Scottish footballer who plays as either a right back or centre-back for the Ardrossan Winton Rovers.

== Early life ==
Craig attended Ardrossan Academy.

== Club career ==
=== Celtic ===
Reid started his career as a youth player with Celtic from 2002 until 2007. Unfortunately, he never made a first team appearance due to serious injuries, after signing from Ardrossan Winton Rovers.Y.F.C. Celtic loaned him out to Stirling Albion during the first half of the 2007–08 season to gain some first team experience. Reid played in 13 league matches during his time at Forthbank Stadium.

=== Queen of the South ===
Reid signed for Dumfries side Queen of the South in the January 2008 transfer window. Queens progressed to the 2008 Scottish Cup final, but Reid was unable to play because he was cup-tied having played for Stirling Albion in a previous round of the competition. Reid played for the Palmerston club in both legs of the Uefa Cup Qualifiers against Danish side FC Nordsjælland.

Reid established himself in the first team of the Palmerston Park side during the 2009–10 season. He signed a new two-year contract extension with Queens on 23 April 2010. Reid's first senior goal was the opener in the Challenge Cup semi final 2–1 win away at Peterhead on Saturday 9 October 2010 when he lashed home a loose ball inside the box.

On 23 April 2011, before the home match versus Cowdenbeath, Davie Rae presented Reid with a trophy in recognition of his century of appearances for the first team. Reid, however, did not complete the match due to receiving a red card.

=== Greenock Morton ===
On 16 July 2012, Reid signed for Greenock Morton on a one-year deal. His contract expired in May 2013. Reid played as a trialist on 24 July 2013 for Coventry City as they lost 2–0 to Fleetwood Town. On 18 October 2013, Reid re-signed for Morton until January 2014. He left the club upon expiry of his contract.

=== Motherwell ===
After training with the club during pre-season, Reid signed for Motherwell until the end of the season, on 21 February 2014. Reid made a major contribution by scoring the winning goal, in injury time, of the final fixture of the season to secure second place ahead of rivals Aberdeen. On 28 May 2014, he signed a new two-year contract with the club. In October 2015, Reid signed an emergency three-month loan with St Mirren. He returned to Motherwell at the end of his loan on 2 January 2016.

=== Dunfermline Athletic ===
On 1 February 2016, Reid left Motherwell by mutual consent, signing the following day for Scottish League One side Dunfermline Athletic until the end of the 2015–16 season. Reid briefly played with and worked under Pars manager Allan Johnston whilst at Queen of the South. After achieving promotion to the Scottish Championship, Reid was released at the end of the 2015–16 season having made 12 appearances for Dunfermline.

=== Keflavík ===
In July 2016, Reid signed for Iceland First Division side Keflavík, becoming the club's third Scottish signing of the 2016 season after Marc McAusland. and Stuart Carswell also joined the club. Reid left Keflavík at the end of the 2016 season after his contract with the club was not renewed.

=== Return to Scotland ===
Reid returned to Scotland in March 2017, signing for Scottish League One side Peterhead until the end of the 2016–17 season. Following the team's relegation to Scottish League Two, Reid was released by the club. Reid subsequently signed for Ayr United in June 2017. He helped them to a promotion in 2017–18, but was released at the end of the season.

== International career ==
Reid played at under-17, under-18 and under-19 level for Scotland.

== Career statistics ==
As of match played 28 October 2017

Appearances and goals by club, season and competition
Club	Season	League			Scottish Cup		League Cup		Other		Total	
Club	Season	Division	Apps	Goals	Apps	Goals	Apps	Goals	Apps	Goals	Apps	Goals
Celtic	2007–08	Premier League	0	0	0	0	0	0	0	0	0	0
Stirling Albion (loan)	2007–08	Division One	13	0	1	0	0	0	0	0	14	0
Queen of the South	2008–09	Division One	15	0	0	0	0	0	0	0	15	0
Queen of the South	2009–10	Division One	32	0	0	0	3	0	2 (Note: Appearances in the Scottish Challenge Cup)	0	37	0
Queen of the South	2010–11	Division One	32	0	1	0	2	0	0	0	35	0
Queen of the South	2011–12	Division One	26	0	3	0	3	0	1	0	33	0
Queen of the South	Total		105	0	4	0	8	0	3	0	120	0
Greenock Morton	2012–13	Division One	30	0	3	0	2	0	1	0	36	0
Greenock Morton	2013–14	Championship	9	0	1	0	1	0	0	0	11	0
Greenock Morton	Total		39	0	4	0	3	0	1	0	47	0
Motherwell	2013–14	Premiership	14	1	0	0	0	0	0	0	14	1
Motherwell	2014–15	Premiership	20	0	1	0	1	0	2 (Note: Appearances in the Europa League)	0	24	0
Motherwell	2015–16	Premiership	0	0	0	0	0	0	0	0	0	0
Motherwell	Total		34	1	1	0	1	0	2	0	38	1
St Mirren (loan)	2015–16	Championship	6	0	0	0	0	0	1	0	7	0
Dunfermline Athletic	2015–16	League One	12	0	0	0	0	0	0	0	12	0
Keflavík	2016	1. deild karla	11	0	0	0	0	0	0	0	11	0
Peterhead	2016–17	League One	8	1	0	0	0	0	3 (Note: Appearances in the League One play-offs)	0	11	1
Ayr United	2017–18	League One	26	0	0	0	0	0	4	0	30	0
Career totals			257	2	10	0	12	0	11	0	290	3

== Honours ==
=== Club ===
Celtic

- Scottish Youth Cup: Winner (2)
- Scottish Youth League: Winner (3)
- Scottish Reserve League: Winner (4)

Dunfermline Athletic

- Scottish League One: 2015–16

Ayr United

- Scottish League One: 2017–18

East Kilbride

- Lowland League: 2018–19
- SFA South Region Challenge Cup: 2018–19

Kelty Hearts

- Lowland League: 2019–20, 2020–21

Darvel

- West of Scotland Football League Premier Division: 2021–22

=== Individual ===
Greenock Morton

- MSC Player of the Year: 2012–13

Queen of the South

- Player of the Year: 2010–11
- Young Player of the Year: 2009–10
