= Graeme Ramage =

Scottish footballer and coach

Personal information
- Date of birth: 28 August 1992 (age 34)
- Place of birth: Alexandria, Scotland
- Position: Midfielder

Youth career
- St Mirren

Senior career*
Years	Team	Apps	(Gls)
2010–2011	St Mirren	1	(0)
2011–2012	Dumbarton	5	(0)
2012	→ East Stirlingshire (loan)	10	(1)
2012–2013	Annan Athletic	15	(5)
2014	Arthurlie		
2014–2015	Clydebank		
2015–2016	Shettleston		
2016	Yoker Athletic		
2017–2018	Kello Rovers		
2018–2019	Kirkintilloch Rob Roy		
2019	Cumnock Juniors		
2019–2020	Vale of Leven		
- * Club domestic league appearances and goals as of 15:29, 1 October 2020 (UTC)

Graeme Ramage (born 28 August 1992) is a Scottish former professional footballer and coach who played as a midfielder.

He has previously played in the Scottish Premier League for St Mirren, .

== Career ==
Born in Alexandria, Ramage began his career with St Mirren and made his Scottish Premier League debut against Celtic in 2010, before signing with Dumbarton in July 2011.

On 4 July 2012, he signed a one-year contract for Annan Athletic. After suffering a knee injury in January 2013, he was then released by Annan at the end of the season.

On 5 March 2014, Ramage signed for Junior club Arthurlie before moving to Clydebank in July the same year. After spells with Shettleston and Yoker Athletic he joined Kello Rovers in 2016.

After a spell with Kirkintilloch Rob Roy, he signed for Cumnock Juniors in June 2019 before moving to Vale of Leven a few months later.

Ramage announced his retirement as a player on 1 October 2020. He then founded the Graeme Ramage Football Academy in West Dunbartonshire.

== Career statistics ==
As of 9 March 2013

Club	Season	League		Cup		League Cup		Other		Total	
Club	Season	Apps	Goals	Apps	Goals	Apps	Goals	Apps	Goals	Apps	Goals
St Mirren	2010–11	1	0	0	0	0	0	0	0	1	0
Dumbarton	2011–12	5	0	0	0	1	0	1	0	7	0
East Stirlingshire (loan)	2011–12	10	1	0	0	0	0	0	0	10	1
Annan Athletic	2012–13	15	5	0	0	1	0	0	0	16	5
Career total		31	6	0	0	2	0	1	0	34	6
