= Ally Love (footballer) =

Scottish footballer (born 1991)

Personal information
- Full name: Alistair Love
- Date of birth: 22 August 1991 (age 35)
- Positions: Striker; winger

Team information
- Current team: Hurlford United

Senior career*
Years	Team	Apps	(Gls)
2010–2011	St Mirren	1	(0)
2010	→ Stenhousemuir (loan)	2	(0)
2011–2012	East Stirlingshire	16	(2)
2012–2014	Annan Athletic	63	(19)
2014–2016	Albion Rovers	56	(19)
2016–2018	Brechin City	39	(8)
2018–2022	Clyde	109	(19)
2022–2023	Dumbarton	32	(5)
2023–	Hurlford United		
- * Club domestic league appearances and goals as of 18:37, 6 May 2023 (UTC)

Alistair Love (born 22 August 1991) is a Scottish professional footballer who plays as a winger for West of Scotland Football League side Hurlford United. Love has previously played for St Mirren, East Stirlingshire, Annan Athletic, Albion Rovers, Brechin City, Clyde and Dumbarton, as well as Stenhousemuir on loan.

== Career ==
Love began his career with St Mirren, where he also spent a loan spell at Stenhousemuir. On 13 May 2011 it was announced that Love would be one of 10 players leaving St. Mirren at the end of the 2010–11 season.

In July 2011 he signed a one-month contract with East Stirlingshire.

After a spell with Annan Athletic, Love signed for Albion Rovers in May 2014. He scored on his debut for the club on 26 July 2014, as Albion Rovers defeated local rivals Airdrieonians 4–2 on penalties following a 2–2 draw in the Scottish Challenge Cup. After two seasons with the Wee Rovers, Love signed for fellow Scottish League One side Brechin City in May 2016.

Love signed with Scottish League Two club Clyde on 1 January 2018, until summer 2019. Love was given a five-game ban for "excessive misconduct" by the Scottish Football Association after being found guilty of racially abusing Annan Athletic player Rabin Omar during Love's first appearance for Clyde. On 3 May 2022, it was announced that Love was one of ten players released by the club following the end of the 2021–22 season. He joined Dumbarton in May 2022 scoring his first goals for the club in a 2-1 victory against Elgin City on 27 August, that secured the best start to a season in the club's 150 year history. He left the Sons in the summer of 2023 and joined Hurlford United.

== Personal life ==
His brother Robert was also a footballer, playing for Stenhousemuir and Albion Rovers.

== Career statistics ==
As of 20:08, 13 May 2023 (UTC)

Appearances and goals by club, season and competition
Club	Season	League			Scottish Cup		League Cup		Other		Total	
Club	Season	Division	Apps	Goals	Apps	Goals	Apps	Goals	Apps	Goals	Apps	Goals
St Mirren	2010–11	Premier League	1	0	0	0	0	0	0	0	1	0
Stenhousemuir (loan)	2010–11	Third Division	2	0	0	0	0	0	0	0	2	0
East Stirlingshire	2011–12	Third Division	16	2	0	0	1	0	1 (Note: Appearances in the Scottish Challenge Cup)	1	18	3
Annan Athletic	2012–13	Third Division	30	12	0	0	1	0	1	0	32	12
Annan Athletic	2013–14	League Two	33	7	4	1	1	0	2 (Note: One appearance in the Scottish Challenge Cup; one appearance and a goal in the League One play-offs)	1	40	9
Annan Athletic	Total		63	19	4	1	2	0	3	1	72	21
Albion Rovers	2014–15	League Two	22	7	2	0	1	0	2	1	27	8
Albion Rovers	2015–16	League One	34	12	1	0	1	0	1	1	37	13
Albion Rovers	Total		56	19	3	0	2	0	3	2	64	21
Brechin City	2016–17	League One	34	8	1	0	4	1	5 (Note: Two appearances and a goal in the Scottish Challenge Cup; three appearances in the Championship play-offs)	1	44	10
Brechin City	2017–18	Championship	5	0	0	0	4	0	1	0	10	0
Brechin City	Total		39	8	1	0	8	1	6	1	54	10
Clyde	2017–18	League Two	13	1	0	0	—		0	0	13	1
Clyde	2018–19	League Two	24	8	1	0	3	0	4	2	32	10
Clyde	2019–20	League One	22	2	2	1	0	0	3	1	27	4
Clyde	2020–21	League One	21	3	2	0	4	1	0	0	27	4
Clyde	2021–22	League One	29	5	1	0	4	2	1	0	35	7
Clyde	Total		109	19	6	1	11	3	8	3	134	26
Dumbarton	2022–23	League Two	32	5	2	0	3	0	2	0	39	5
Career total			318	72	16	2	27	4	23	8	384	86
