= Roddy McKenzie =

Scottish footballer (born 1975)

Personal information
- Date of birth: 8 August 1975 (age 51)
- Place of birth: Bellshill, Scotland
- Position: Goalkeeper

Senior career*
Years	Team	Apps	(Gls)
1993–2003	Hearts	49	(0)
1995–1996	→ Stenhousemuir (loan)	36	(0)
2003–2006	Livingston	100	(0)
2006–2008	Dunfermline Athletic	14	(0)
2008–2010	Livingston	56	(0)
2010–2012	Queen of the South	11	(0)
Total		266	(0)

International career
1996	Scotland U21	2	(0)
- * Club domestic league appearances and goals

Roderick McKenzie (born 8 August 1975) is a Scottish retired professional association footballer who played as goalkeeper. He is currently running a football business called first choice goalkeeping. After leaving Queen of the South by mutual consent on 10 January 2012.

His greatest success to date has been with Livingston for whom he made over 150 league appearances and won the Scottish League Cup.

== Career ==
=== Hearts & Stenhousemuir ===
McKenzie started his career with Heart of Midlothian, signing his first contract in 1993. He did not experience any first team football until he went on a year-long loan at Stenhousemuir in the 1995–96 season. The highlight of his spell at Ochilview Park was Stenhousemuir's victory in the Scottish Challenge Cup, when McKenzie saved a penalty in the 5–4 penalty shootout win against Dundee United, following a 0–0 draw.

McKenzie returned to Hearts and played as an understudy to, among others, Gilles Rousset and Antti Niemi. He was never able to establish himself permanently in the first team making 52 starts over 10 years at the Tynecastle club.

=== Livingston & Dunfermline Athletic ===
McKenzie moved from Hearts to Livingston in 2003. McKenzie appeared 119 times during his 3 1/2-year spell in West Lothian. Livingston won their first major honour when they defeated Hibernian 2–0 in the 2004 Scottish League Cup final with goals in the final scored by Derek Lilley and Jamie McAllister. This triumph came amidst a cash crisis and period in administration for Livingston, which severely weakened the playing side. Despite McKenzie's best efforts, the club was relegated after several years of struggle, following the 2005–06 season.

In July 2006, McKenzie accepted a contract with Dunfermline Athletic, making his debut against former club Hearts later that month. In the January 2008, McKenzie was released from his contract with Dunfermline after sustaining a bad injury to his back.

In August 2008 it was announced that McKenzie had re-signed for his former club Livingston on a three-year deal.

=== Queen of the South ===
Dumfries club Queen of the South announced on 1 June 2010 that he had signed on a two-year contract as had fellow goalkeeper Ross Hyslop. On 18 July 2010 McKenzie sustained a torn cruciate in the pre season testimonial game for Jim Thomson against Rangers at Palmerston Park. The severity of the injury merited Queens temporarily signing Lee Robinson to provide additional goalkeeping resource to the supplement David Hutton due to McKenzie's projected prolonged absence.

McKenzie eventually made his competitive debut for Queens on 19 March 2011 in the 2–1 win at Ross County.

At the start of the 2011–12 season and Hutton's departure, McKenzie was unable to establish himself ahead of the returning Robinson. The club announced McKenzie's departure from Palmerston Park on 10 Jan 2012 by mutual consent.

== Coaching career ==
McKenzie joined the coaching staff of Junior side Thorniewood United in the summer of 2014.

== Honours ==
Stenhousemuir

- Scottish Challenge Cup 1995–96

Livingston

- Scottish League Cup 2003–04
