= Steven Black (footballer) =

Scottish footballer

Personal information
- Date of birth: 17 June 1992 (age 34)
- Place of birth: Dumfries, Scotland
- Position: Centre-back

Team information
- Current team: Dalbeattie Star

Youth career
- 2003–2009: Queen of the South

Senior career*
Years	Team	Apps	(Gls)
2009–2013	Queen of the South	21	(0)
2010	→ Gretna 2008 (loan)		
2013	→ Annan Athletic (loan)	3	(0)
2013–2017	Annan Athletic	82	(2)
2017–2018	Gretna 2008		
2020–	Dalbeattie Star	4	(0)

International career^{‡}
2009	Scotland U18	4	(0)
- * Club domestic league appearances and goals as of 15:00, 28 May 2021 (UTC) ‡ National team caps and goals as of 18:45, 14 February 2020 (UTC)

Steven Black (born 17 June 1992) is a Scottish professional footballer who plays as a centre-back for Dalbeattie Star.

== Early life ==
Black was born in Dumfries, and attended Annan Academy as a pupil in Dumfries and Galloway.

== Career ==
=== Club career ===
Black joined Queen of the South's youth set-up at eleven years old. After progressing through the youth set-up, Black signed a modern apprenticeship contract in May 2009, having already represented his country at schoolboy level.

In 2010, Black was on loaned out to Gretna 2008 and during his loan spell he even played in goal versus Hawick Royal Albert, due to an injury to the keeper and all substitutes were already utilised.

On 26 March 2011, Black debuted for the Doonhamers first-team in a 4–1 home league win versus Stirling Albion as an 83rd-minute substitute. On 26 April 2011, Black started his first match for Queens a month later versus Ross County alongside David Lilley in central defence in a 1–0 defeat. Black won the under-19's Players' Player of the season award in June 2011.

On 4 March 2013, Black was loaned out to Annan Athletic for one month. On 22 June 2013, Black returned to the Black and Golds, this time on a permanent deal. Black then spent four seasons with the Galabankies before signing for Lowland League club Gretna 2008 in June 2017, after previously being out on loan at Raydale Park whilst being a Queen of the South player.

On 14 February 2020, Black signed for Lowland League club Dalbeattie Star.

=== International career ===
Black was selected for the Scotland international schools squad in January 2011 for the Schools Centenary Internationals. Black played for Scotland's under-18 national team on four occasions versus Northern Ireland, England, Australia and Wales.

== Honours ==
Queen of the South

- Scottish Challenge Cup: 2012–13
