= Dan Orsi =

Scottish footballer

Personal information
- Date of birth: 31 March 1992 (age 34)
- Place of birth: Dumfries, Scotland
- Position: Midfielder

Team information
- Current team: Dalbeattie Star

Senior career*
Years	Team	Apps	(Gls)
2010–2013	Queen of the South	30	(1)
2012–2013	→ Annan Athletic (loan)	14	(1)
2013–2014	Annan Athletic	7	(0)
2014–2017	Glenafton Athletic	100	(14)
2017–2018	Annan Athletic	26	(0)
2018	Dalbeattie Star		
2018	Kilsyth Rangers		
2018–2020	Glenafton Athletic	60	(12)
2020–	Dalbeattie Star	10	(3)
- * Club domestic league appearances and goals as of 15:00, 28 May 2021 (UTC)

Daniel Orsi (born 31 March 1992) is a Scottish footballer who plays for Dalbeattie Star.

Orsi has previously played for Queen of the South and Annan Athletic in the Scottish Professional Football League.

== Career ==
Orsi is from Dumfries and a former pupil of Dumfries Academy. As well as playing in the youth set up for Queen of the South, Orsi made his début for the first-team, appearing as a substitute in a friendly match in season 2009-10 versus Celtic. Orsi was selected for six squads in the Scotland under-18 international set-up, namely for the matches versus Australia and New Zealand and also for the Centenary Shield matches versus England, Northern Ireland, Republic of Ireland and Wales. Queen of the South teammate Dean Thomson was also selected for the squad but had to withdraw due to tonsillitis.

On 25 July 2010, Orsi was announced on the Queens website as having officially signed for the club, having previously been on a youth contract. Also announced were the signings of Steven Degnan, Ian McShane and Gavin Reilly on similar deals. On 26 March 2011, Orsi was awarded the man-of-the-match award, in only his sixth match for the club in a 4-1 league win at Palmerston Park versus Stirling Albion. On 29 March 2011, just three days later in his next game, away to Stirling Albion at Forthbank Stadium, Orsi scored his first senior goal in the fourth minute of the match in a 2–0 win, after receiving a pass from Colin McMenamin and placing the ball through the keeper's legs and into the net. However, in the sixteenth minute he was stretchered off with a knee injury after making an awkward challenge.

Orsi was then loaned out to Annan Athletic in February 2013 for the remainder of the season. He played in the club's win versus Rangers at Ibrox Stadium the following month.

In December 2013 Orsi signed for Annan Athletic on a six-month contract until May 2014.

Orsi joined Scottish Juniors club Glenafton Athletic from New Cumnock in June 2014. He spent three seasons there winning the league championship in the 2016–17 season. He also won the Scottish Junior Cup at Rugby Park in a 2–1 win versus local rivals Auchinleck Talbot on 4 June 2017.

Orsi re-signed for Annan Athletic on 22 June 2017, but left the club in early 2018 citing the pressures of university and work commitments. He joined Dalbeattie Star in May 2018 for the last few games of the season to alleviate a player shortage at the club.

For the 2018–19 season, Orsi joined Kilsyth Rangers under the management of his old Queen of the South colleague Jim Thomson. His spell at Duncansfield was brief however and Orsi joined Glenafton Athletic for a second time in September 2018.

Orsi rejoined Dalbeattie Star in July 2020.

== Personal life ==
Orsi has also competed in the Scottish Schools Cross Country Championships.
