= Gavin Reilly =

Scottish footballer (born 1993)

Personal information
- Full name: Gavin Christopher Reilly
- Date of birth: 10 May 1993 (age 33)
- Place of birth: Dumfries, Scotland
- Height: 5 ft 11 in (1.81 m)
- Position: Striker

Team information
- Current team: Arbroath
- Number: 10

Youth career
- 2005-2010: Queen of the South

Senior career*
Years	Team	Apps	(Gls)
2010–2015	Queen of the South	111	(39)
2010–2011	→ Gretna 2008 (loan)		
2015–2017	Heart of Midlothian	28	(4)
2016–2017	→ Dunfermline Ath (loan)	22	(1)
2017–2018	St Mirren	35	(11)
2018–2020	Bristol Rovers	34	(4)
2019–2020	→ Cheltenham Town (loan)	21	(4)
2020–2021	Carlisle United	16	(0)
2021–2022	Livingston	6	(0)
2021–2022	→ Greenock Morton (loan)	29	(5)
2022–2024	Queen of the South	47	(14)
2023	→ Stenhousemuir (loan)	11	(2)
2024–	Arbroath	52	(12)
- * Club domestic league appearances and goals as of 4 May 2026

Gavin Christopher Reilly (born 10 May 1993) is a Scottish professional footballer who plays as a striker for Scottish Championship club Arbroath.

== Career ==
=== Queen of the South (first spell) ===
Reilly arrived through the youth ranks of Dumfries club Queen of the South, signing a professional contract before the start of the 2010–11 season. He made his competitive first-team debut on 31 July 2010, in a 5–1 Scottish League Cup first round win versus Dumbarton as an 83rd-minute substitute for Derek Holmes. Reilly marked the occasion by scoring the team's fifth and final goal of the match. Reilly's league debut was as an 86th minute substitute in the season's opening 1–0 away defeat away to Dundee.

Reilly scored 15 goals in 22 starts during the 2012–13 season and then scored 12 goals in 19 league starts in the 2013–14 season. In August 2014, he went on trial with English Championship club Brentford.

=== Heart of Midlothian ===
On 23 June 2015, it was announced that Reilly had signed a three-year contract with Scottish Premiership club Heart of Midlothian, with an undisclosed development fee being paid to Queen of the South. The announcement stated that Reilly had scored 44 first team goals in over 140 games, including over 80 starting appearances since his debut as a 17-year-old. He scored his first goal for Hearts on 12 August 2015, in a 6–0 win versus Motherwell from the penalty spot.

In June 2016, Reilly joined Scottish Championship club Dunfermline Athletic on a year-long loan deal. He had previously worked with Dunfermline manager Allan Johnston at Queen of the South, where he helped the club win the Scottish Second Division and also the 2013 Scottish Challenge Cup Final versus Partick Thistle in the 2012–13 season. Reilly's first appearance for the Pars was in a 3–0 victory at East End Park in the Scottish League Cup and his first goal arrived in a 2–1 defeat away to Hibernian at Easter Road. After the arrival of his former Queens strike-partner Nicky Clark from Bury at the end of August 2016, Reilly's remaining minutes on the pitch were restricted to second-half substitute appearances and he ended his season with the club, having scored 2 goals in 28 appearances.

=== St Mirren ===
Reilly signed a one-year deal with Scottish Championship club St Mirren on 12 June 2017. He scored 22 goals in 44 games for Saints, as he helped fire them to the Scottish Championship title. Reilly left St Mirren at the end of the season when new manager Alan Stubbs opted to withdraw the offer of a new contract.

=== Bristol Rovers ===
In July 2018, Reilly departed the Buddies and signed for Bristol Rovers on a free transfer. On 22 September 2018, he scored his first league goal for the Pirates in the 7th minute at home to Coventry City in a 3–1 win. In 2018–19 he featured in 35 competitive first team games, of which he started 16 in the league and was brought on as substitute 14 times. He was substituted in 13 of those league games that he started. From the 35 games in which he played he scored 4 goals.

Reilly was not offered a new deal with the League One club at the end of the 2019–20 season.

==== Cheltenham Town (loan) ====
On 1 August 2019, Reilly joined English League Two club Cheltenham Town on loan for the first half of the 2019-20 season.

=== Carlisle United ===
On 4 August 2020, Reilly signed a one-year contract with Carlisle United following his release from Bristol Rovers. On 5 January 2021, Reilly left Carlisle United via mutual consent.

=== Livingston ===
On 5 January 2021, Reilly signed for Scottish Premiership club Livingston on an 18-month contract.

On 30 August 2021, Reilly was sent on loan to Greenock Morton for the entire 2021–22 season.

=== Queen of the South (second spell) ===
On 24 May 2022, Reilly returned to Dumfries club Queen of the South on a two-year contract, despite the Doonhamers relegation to Scottish League One at the end of the 2021-22 season.

=== Stenhousemuir (loan) ===
On 23 February 2023, Reilly was loaned out to Stenhousemuir until the end of the season.

=== Arbroath ===
On 6 May 2024, Reilly signed a pre-contract with Arbroath on a two-year deal, having decided to play part-time whilst taking up an apprenticeship outside the game.

== Career statistics ==
As of 7 May 2024

Appearances and goals by club, season and competition
Club	Season	League			National Cup		League Cup		Other		Total	
Club	Season	Division	Apps	Goals	Apps	Goals	Apps	Goals	Apps	Goals	Apps	Goals
Queen of the South	2010–11	Scottish First Division	1	0	0	0	1	1	1	0	3	1
Queen of the South	2011–12	Scottish First Division	14	2	2	0	0	0	0	0	16	2
Queen of the South	2012–13	Second Division	30	12	1	1	3	1	5	1	39	15
Queen of the South	2013–14	Scottish Championship	34	12	2	0	3	0	1	0	40	12
Queen of the South	2014–15	Scottish Championship	32	13	3	2	1	0	3	0	39	15
Queen of the South	Total		111	39	8	3	8	2	10	1	137	45
Gretna 2008 (loan)	2010–11	East of Scotland Football League	0	0	0	0	0	0	0	0	0	0
Heart of Midlothian	2015–16	Scottish Premiership	28	4	2	0	2	0	0	0	32	4
Heart of Midlothian	2016–17	Scottish Premiership	0	0	0	0	0	0	0	0	0	0
Heart of Midlothian	Total		28	4	2	0	2	0	0	0	32	4
Dunfermline Athletic (loan)	2016–17	Scottish Championship	22	1	2	0	2	0	2	1	28	2
St Mirren	2017–18	Scottish Championship	35	11	2	5	4	3	3	3	44	22
Bristol Rovers	2018–19	League One	30	4	0	0	1	0	4	0	35	4
Bristol Rovers	2019–20	League One	4	0	0	0	0	0	0	0	4	0
Bristol Rovers	Total		34	4	0	0	1	0	4	0	39	4
Cheltenham Town (loan)	2019–20	League Two	21	4	1	0	0	0	0	0	22	4
Carlisle United	2020–21	League Two	16	0	2	0	1	0	2	1	21	1
Livingston	2020–21	Scottish Premiership	5	0	0	0	2	0	0	0	7	0
Livingston	2021–22	Scottish Premiership	1	0	0	0	3	0	0	0	4	0
Livingston	Total		6	0	0	0	5	0	0	0	11	0
Greenock Morton (loan)	2021-22	Scottish Championship	29	5	3	1	0	0	3	0	35	6
Queen of the South	2022-23	Scottish League One	20	5	1	0	1	0	2	0	24	5
Queen of the South	2023-24	Scottish League One	30	9	1	1	4	3	1	1	36	14
Queen of the South	Total		50	14	2	1	5	3	3	1	60	19
Stenhousemuir (loan)	2022-23	Scottish League Two	11	2	0	0	0	0	0	0	11	2
Career total			363	84	22	10	28	8	27	7	440	109

== Honours ==
Queen of the South

- Scottish Challenge Cup: 2012–13
