= Alan Muir (referee) =

Scottish football referee

- Full name: Alan James Muir
- Born: 10 May 1975 (age 51); Scotland

Domestic
Years	League	Role
1992-	Scottish Football Association	Referee
2004-2013	SFL / SPL	Referee
2013-	SPFL	Referee
2009-2012	FIFA	Referee

Alan James Muir (born 10 May 1975) is a Scottish football referee.
