= 2012–13 Stenhousemuir F.C. season =

Stenhousemuir
2012–13 season
- Chairman: Bill Darroch
- Manager: Martyn Corrigan
- Stadium: Ochilview Park
- Second Division: Sixth place
- Challenge Cup: Quarter-final, lost to Arbroath
- League Cup: Third round, lost to Inverness Caledonian Thistle
- Scottish Cup: Fourth round, lost to Falkirk
- Top goalscorer: League: John Gemmell (18); All: John Gemmell (22)
- Highest home attendance: 1,758 vs Falkirk; Scottish Cup; 1 December 2012
- Lowest home attendance: 282 vs Brechin City; League Cup; 4 August 2012

The 2012–13 season was Stenhousemuir's fourth consecutive season in the Scottish Second Division, having been promoted from the Scottish Third Division at the end of the 2008–09 season. Stenhousemuir also competed in the Challenge Cup, League Cup and the Scottish Cup.

== Summary ==
=== Season ===
Stenhousemuir finished sixth in the Scottish Second Division. They reached the Quarter-final of the Challenge Cup, the third round of the League Cup and the fourth round of the Scottish Cup.

=== Management ===
Stenhousemuir were managed by Martyn Corrigan for the 2012–13 season, following the resignation of Davie Irons for personal reasons.

== Results & fixtures ==
Win Draw Loss Postponed

=== Scottish Second Division ===
11 August 2012 Scottish Second Division	Ayr United	1 – 1	Stenhousemuir	Somerset Park
15:00	Winters 19'	SFL Report	McMillan 90'	Attendance: 1,248; Referee: O'Reilly

18 August 2012 Scottish Second Division	Stenhousemuir	3 – 1	Brechin City	Ochilview Park
15:00	Gemmell 21', 73', 90'	SFL Report	Jackson 58'	Attendance: 522; Referee: Anderson

25 August 2012 Scottish Second Division	Stranraer	1 – 1	Stenhousemuir	Stair Park
15:00	Borris 58'	SFL Report	McMillan 19'	Attendance: 290; Referee: Graham

1 September 2012 Scottish Second Division	Stenhousemuir	0 – 4	Forfar Athletic	Ochilview Park
15:00		SFL Report	Tulloch 37'; Campbell 45' (Penalty); Denholm 62'; Templeman 89'	Attendance: 673; Referee: Hilland

15 September 2012 Scottish Second Division	Alloa Athletic	0 – 2	Stenhousemuir	Recreation Park
15:00		SFL Report	Smith 67'; Ferguson 91' (Penalty)	Attendance: 509; Referee: Cook

22 September 2012 Scottish Second Division	Albion Rovers	4 – 4	Stenhousemuir	Cliftonhill Stadium
15:00	Crawford 13', 84'; McGuigan 49'; Phillips 82'	SFL Report	Kean 26', 32', 90'; Rodgers 56'	Attendance: 389; Referee: Northcroft

29 September 2012 Scottish Second Division	Stenhousemuir	2 – 2	Arbroath	Ochilview Park
15:00	Gemmell 46'; McKinlay 90'	SFL Report; SFC Report	Sibanda 61'; Currie 90'	Attendance: 633; Referee: McDermott

6 October 2012 Scottish Second Division	Stenhousemuir	3 – 0	East Fife	Ochilview Park
15:00	Gemmell 65', 68'; Kean 72'	SFL Report		Attendance: 589; Referee: Dallas

20 October 2012 Scottish Second Division	Queen of the South	2 – 2	Stenhousemuir	Palmerston Park
15:00	Durnan 2'; Young (red card) 45'; Clark 48'; Holt (red card) 90'	SFL Report	Gemmell 68'; Ferguson 71' (pen.)	Attendance: 1,531; Referee: Hilland

27 October 2012 Scottish Second Division	Brechin City	7 – 2	Stenhousemuir	Glebe Park
15:00	Byrne 9'; Trouten 31', 42', 63'; McKenna 69' (pen.); Carcary 82', 84'	SFL Report	Gemmell 29'; Dickson 55'; Ferguson (red card) 68'	Attendance: 542; Referee: McLean

10 November 2012 Scottish Second Division	Stenhousemuir	1 – 1	Ayr United	Ochilview Park
15:00	Smith 84'	SFL Report	Moffat 68'	Attendance: 586; Referee: O'Reilly

17 November 2012 Scottish Second Division	Forfar Athletic	3 – 2	Stenhousemuir	Station Park
15:00	Swankie 5', 23'; Motion 74'	SFL Report	McMillan 35'; Rodgers 58' (pen.)	Attendance: 432; Referee: Cook

24 November 2012 Scottish Second Division	Stenhousemuir	0 – 2	Alloa Athletic	Ochilview Park
15:00		SFL Report	Cawley 24'; Simmons 36'	Attendance: 671; Referee: Graham

8 December 2012 Scottish Second Division	Arbroath	2 – 2	Stenhousemuir	Gayfield Park
15:00	Doris 10'; Malcolm 51'	SFL Report	Smith 3'; Kean 90+2'	Attendance: 647; Referee: McKendrick

15 December 2012 Scottish Second Division	Stenhousemuir	1 – 0	Albion Rovers	Ochilview Park
15:00	Smith 53'; McKinlay (yellow card) 80' (yellow-red card)	SFL Report	Marriott (red card) 90+3'	Attendance: 396; Referee: Finnie

22 December 2012 Scottish Second Division	East Fife	3 – 2	Stenhousemuir	Bayview Stadium
15:00	Barr 5'; Campbell 32'; McBride 71'	SFL Report	Kean 57'; Rodgers 69'	Attendance: 408; Referee: Allan

29 December 2012 Scottish Second Division	Stenhousemuir	1 – 3	Queen of the South	Ochilview Park
15:00	Kean 90'	BBC Sport	Reilly 32', 69'; Clark 55'	Attendance: 632; Referee: Tumilty

2 January 2013 Scottish Second Division	Alloa Athletic	1 – 0	Stenhousemuir	Recreation Park
15:00	McCord 17'	SFL Report		Attendance: 603; Referee: Hilland

5 January 2013 Scottish Second Division	Stenhousemuir	2 – 0	Forfar Athletic	Ochilview Park
15:00	Dickson 65'; Smith 67'	SFL Sport		Attendance: 461; Referee: Aitken

12 January 2013 Scottish Second Division	Stenhousemuir	0 – 0	Stranraer	Ochilview Park
15:00		SFL Sport		Attendance: 484; Referee: Northcroft

19 January 2013 Scottish Second Division	Ayr United	P – P	Stenhousemuir	Somerset Park
15:00		BBC Report
Note: Postponed due to frozen pitch

26 January 2013 Scottish Second Division	Albion Rovers	P – P	Stenhousemuir	Cliftonhill Stadium
15:00		STV Report
Note: Postponed due to frozen pitch

2 February 2013 Scottish Second Division	Stenhousemuir	1 – 0	Arbroath	Ochilview Park
15:00	Gemmell 45'	SFL Sport		Attendance: 459; Referee: Anderson

9 February 2013 Scottish Second Division	Queen of the South	2 – 1	Stenhousemuir	Palmerston Park
15:00	Young 34'; Mitchell 45'	SFL Report	Corcoran 47'	Attendance: 1,354; Referee: Robertson

16 February 2013 Scottish Second Division	Stenhousemuir	2 – 1	East Fife	Ochilview Park
15:00	Hodge 60', 85'	SFL Report	McBride 55'	Attendance: 476; Referee: Graham

19 February 2013 Scottish Second Division	Albion Rovers	P – P	Stenhousemuir	Cliftonhill Stadium
19:45		BBC Report
Note: Postponed due to frozen pitch

23 February 2013 Scottish Second Division	Stranraer	1 – 1	Stenhousemuir	Stair Park
15:00	Gribben 3'	SFL Report	McKinlay 22'	Attendance: 346; Referee: Robertson

26 February 2013 Scottish Second Division	Ayr United	1 – 2	Stenhousemuir	Somerset Park
19:45	Winters 33'	SFL Report	Dickson 60'; Corcoran 90+2'	Attendance: 821; Referee: Muir

2 March 2013 Scottish Second Division	Stenhousemuir	3 – 3	Brechin City	Ochilview Park
15:00	Corcoran 20'; Hay 55' (o.g.); Gemmell 63'; Gemmell (red card) 90'	SFL Report	Trouten 6'; Moyes 70'; McKenna 77'; Fusco (yellow card) 82' (yellow-red card)	Attendance: 504; Referee: Somers

5 March 2013 Scottish Second Division	Albion Rovers	4 – 3	Stenhousemuir	Cliftonhill Stadium
19:45	Dallas 8'; Crawford 19'; Reid 50'; Sally 69'	SFL Report	Gemmell 53' (Penalty), 85'; Reid 90+1'	Attendance: 206; Referee: Dallas

9 March 2013 Scottish Second Division	Stenhousemuir	1 – 1	Alloa Athletic	Ochilview Park
15:00	Smith 69'	SFL Report	McCord 22' (Penalty)	Attendance: 513; Referee: Aitken

16 March 2013 Scottish Second Division	Forfar Athletic	3 – 3	Stenhousemuir	Station Park
15:00	Kader 10'; Denholm 77'; Campbell 37' (Penalty)	SFL Report	Kean 5'; Gemmell 31', 35'; Buist (red card) 86'	Attendance: 395; Referee: Roache

23 March 2013 Scottish Second Division	Arbroath	P – P	Stenhousemuir	Gayfield Park
15:00		BBC Report
Note: Postponed due to high winds

30 March 2013 Scottish Second Division	Stenhousemuir	0 – 1	Albion Rovers	Ochilview Park
15:00		SFL Report	Dallas 1'	Attendance: 360; Referee: Cook

3 April 2013 Scottish Second Division	Arbroath	0 – 0	Stenhousemuir	Gayfield Park
19:45		Report		Attendance: 532; Referee: McKendrick

13 April 2013 Scottish Second Division	East Fife	1 – 2	Stenhousemuir	Bayview Stadium
15:00	McBride 67'; McCormack (yellow card) 88' (yellow-red card)	SFL Report	Buist 43'; Gemmell 52'	Attendance: 461; Referee: Roache

16 April 2013 Scottish Second Division	Stenhousemuir	2 – 1	Queen of the South	Ochilview Park
19:30	Smith 28'; Dickson 72'	SFL Report	Mitchell 44'	Attendance: 504; Referee: Charleston

20 April 2013 Scottish Second Division	Stenhousemuir	4 – 0	Ayr United	Ochilview Park
15:00	Dickson 5'; Gemmell 20', 42' (Penalty); Smith 56'	SFL Report	Smith (red card) 42'	Attendance: 497; Referee: Somers

27 April 2013 Scottish Second Division	Brechin City	1 – 2	Stenhousemuir	Glebe Park
15:00	Trouten 75'	SFL Report	Rowson 8'; Reid 34'	Attendance: 474; Referee: Hilland

4 May 2013 Scottish Second Division	Stenhousemuir	1 – 2	Stranraer	Ochilview Park
15:00	Gemmell 22'; Ross (yellow card) 90+1' (yellow-red card)	SFL Report	Malcolm 4', 44' (Penalty)	Attendance: 818; Referee: O'Reilly

=== Scottish Challenge Cup ===
28 July 2012 Scottish Challenge Cup round 1	Stranraer	1 – 2	Stenhousemuir	Stair Park
15:00	Winter 71'	SFL Report	Gemmell 36'; Ferguson 86'	Attendance: 306; Referee: Roache

14 August 2012 Scottish Challenge Cup round 2	Annan Athletic	0 – 3	Stenhousemuir	Galabank
19:30		SFL Report	Kean 25'; Dickson 31'; Rodgers 60'	Attendance: 449; Referee: McKendrick

9 September 2012 Scottish Challenge Cup QF	Arbroath	1 – 0	Stenhousemuir	Gayfield Park
15:00	Robertson 34'	SFL Report	Gemmell (red card) 49'	Attendance: 623; Referee: Colvin

=== Scottish League Cup ===
4 August 2012 Scottish League Cup round 1	Stenhousemuir	4 – 0	Brechin City	Ochilview Park
15:00	Gemmell 1'; Smith 76', 90'; Kean 88' (Penalty)	SFL Report	McLauchlan (red card) 87'	Attendance: 282; Referee: Somers

28 August 2012 Scottish League Cup round 2	Kilmarnock	1 – 2	Stenhousemuir	Rugby Park
19:45	Nelson 90'	BBC Report	Ferguson 20' (Penalty); Gemmell 43'	Attendance: 2,538; Referee: Collum

25 September 2012 Scottish League Cup round 3	Stenhousemuir	1 – 1 (a.e.t.) (5 – 6 p)	Inverness Caledonian Thistle	Ochilview Park
19:45	Ferguson 40' (pen.)	BBC Report	McKay 23'	Attendance: 705; Referee: Madden
	Penalties
	Ferguson (penalty scored); Rodgers (penalty scored); Hodge (penalty missed); Gemmell (penalty scored); McMillan (penalty scored); Kean (penalty scored); Smith (penalty missed)		Foran (penalty missed); Shinnie (penalty scored); Morrison (penalty scored); Doran (penalty scored); Shinnie (penalty scored); Draper (penalty scored); Roberts (penalty scored)

=== Scottish Cup ===
3 November 2012 Scottish Cup round 3	Stenhousemuir	1 – 1	Berwick Rangers	Ochilview Park
15:00	Kean 78'; McKinlay (yellow card) 83' (yellow-red card)	BBC Report	Currie 32'	Attendance: 439; Referee: Robertson

13 November 2012 Scottish Cup round 3 replay	Berwick Rangers	2 – 5	Stenhousemuir	Shielfield Park
19:45	Currie 11' (pen.), (yellow card) 87' (yellow-red card); Lavery 66'	BBC Report	Smith 39', 86'; Gemmell 48'; Kean 52', 56'	Attendance: 402; Referee: Robertson

1 December 2012 Scottish Cup round 4	Stenhousemuir	0 – 1	Falkirk	Ochilview Park
15:00		BBC Report	Duffie 9'	Attendance: 1,758; Referee: Northcroft

== Player statistics ==
=== Squad ===
Last updated 12 May 2013

No.	Pos	Nat	Player	Total		Second Division		Challenge Cup		League Cup		Scottish Cup	
No.	Pos	Nat	Player	Apps	Goals	Apps	Goals	Apps	Goals	Apps	Goals	Apps	Goals
	GK	(Scotland) SCO	Connor Fairley	0	0	0+0	0	0+0	0	0+0	0	0+0	0
	GK	(Scotland) SCO	Callum Reidford	28	0	22+0	0	3+0	0	2+0	0	1+0	0
	GK	(Scotland) SCO	Dean Shaw	1	0	0+1	0	0+0	0	0+0	0	0+0	0
	GK	(Scotland) SCO	Chris Smith	7	0	7+0	0	0+0	0	0+0	0	0+0	0
	GK	(Scotland) SCO	Robbie Thomson	10	0	7+0	0	0+0	0	1+0	0	2+0	0
	DF	(Scotland) SCO	Scott Buist	26	1	20+0	1	3+0	0	2+0	0	1+0	0
	DF	(Scotland) SCO	Nicky Devlin	8	0	7+1	0	0+0	0	0+0	0	0+0	0
	DF	(Scotland) SCO	Robbie Duncan	2	0	1+1	0	0+0	0	0+0	0	0+0	0
	DF	(Scotland) SCO	Jack Hamilton	0	0	0+0	0	0+0	0	0+0	0	0+0	0
	DF	(Scotland) SCO	Lee Kilday	3	0	3+0	0	0+0	0	0+0	0	0+0	0
	DF	(Scotland) SCO	Alan Lawson	2	0	1+1	0	0+0	0	0+0	0	0+0	0
	DF	(Cameroon) CMR	Joe Mbu	5	0	5+0	0	0+0	0	0+0	0	0+0	0
	DF	(Scotland) SCO	Brad McKay	4	0	3 +1	0	0+0	0	0+0	0	0+0	0
	DF	(Scotland) SCO	Kevin McKinlay	32	2	25+1	2	1+0	0	3+0	0	2+0	0
	DF	(Scotland) SCO	Ross McMillan	36	3	27+1	3	3+0	0	3+0	0	2+0	0
	DF	(Scotland) SCO	Greg Ross	42	0	32+1	0	3+0	0	3+0	0	3+0	0
	MF	(Scotland) SCO	Craig Anderson	26	0	12+7	0	1+1	0	1+2	0	2+0	0
	MF	(Scotland) SCO	Ross Brash	8	0	1+4	0	0+1	0	0+1	0	0+1	0
	MF	(Scotland) SCO	Mark Corcoran	14	3	9+5	3	0+0	0	0+0	0	0+0	0
	MF	(Scotland) SCO	Sean Dickson	44	6	29+6	5	3+0	1	3+0	0	3+0	0
	MF	(Scotland) SCO	Brown Ferguson	29	5	16+6	2	2+0	1	3+0	2	2+0	0
	MF	(Scotland) SCO	Bryan Hodge	44	2	35+0	2	3+0	0	3+0	0	3+0	0
	MF	(Scotland) SCO	Jamie O'Grady	2	0	0+0	0	0+0	0	0+0	0	1+1	0
	MF	(Scotland) SCO	Eric Paton	9	0	3+3	0	1+0	0	0+0	0	1+1	0
	MF	(Scotland) SCO	Nick Phinn	1	0	0+1	0	0+0	0	0+0	0	0+0	0
	MF	(Scotland) SCO	Jamie Reid	13	2	8+5	2	0+0	0	0+0	0	0+0	0
	MF	(Scotland) SCO	David Rowson	18	1	18+0	1	0+0	0	0+0	0	0+0	0
	MF	(Scotland) SCO	Cieran Summers	1	0	0+1	0	0+0	0	0+0	0	0+0	0
	MF	(Scotland) SCO	Iain Thomson	37	0	18+11	0	1+1	0	3+0	0	1+2	0
	FW	(Scotland) SCO	Kieran Anderson	2	0	0+1	0	0+0	0	0+0	0	0+1	0
	FW	(Spain) ESP	Daniel Exposito-Hepburn	1	0	0+1	0	0+0	0	0+0	0	0+0	0
	FW	(Scotland) SCO	John Gemmell	32	22	23+1	18	3+0	1	3+0	2	2+0	1
	FW	(Scotland) SCO	Stewart Kean	37	13	26+3	8	2+0	1	2+1	1	3+0	3
	FW	(Algeria) ALG	Salim Kouider–Aissa	7	0	0+7	0	0+0	0	0+0	0	0+0	0
	FW	(Scotland) SCO	Stuart Love	5	0	0+4	0	0+1	0	0+0	0	0+0	0
	FW	(Scotland) SCO	Andy Rodgers	25	4	10+6	3	2+1	1	1+2	0	1+2	0
	FW	(Scotland) SCO	Owen Ronald	1	0	0+1	0	0+0	0	0+0	0	0+0	0
	FW	(Scotland) SCO	Darren Smith	40	12	29+3	8	2+1	0	0+2	2	2+1	2

=== Disciplinary record ===
Includes all competitive matches.

Last updated 12 May 2013

Nation	Position	Name	Second Division		Challenge Cup		League Cup		Scottish Cup		Total	
Nation	Position	Name	Yellow card	Red card	Yellow card	Red card	Yellow card	Red card	Yellow card	Red card	Yellow card	Red card
(Scotland)	GK	Connor Fairley	0	0	0	0	0	0	0	0	0	0
(Scotland)	GK	Callum Reidford	0	0	0	0	0	0	1	0	1	0
(Scotland)	GK	Dean Shaw	0	0	0	0	0	0	0	0	0	0
(Scotland)	GK	Chris Smith	0	0	0	0	0	0	0	0	0	0
(Scotland)	GK	Robbie Thomson	0	0	0	0	0	0	0	0	0	0
(Scotland)	DF	Scott Buist	5	1	1	0	1	0	1	0	8	1
(Scotland)	DF	Nicky Devlin	2	0	0	0	0	0	0	0	2	0
(Scotland)	DF	Robbie Duncan	0	0	0	0	0	0	0	0	0	0
(Scotland)	DF	Jack Hamilton	0	0	0	0	0	0	0	0	0	0
(Scotland)	DF	Lee Kilday	0	0	0	0	0	0	0	0	0	0
(Scotland)	DF	Alan Lawson	0	0	0	0	0	0	0	0	0	0
(Cameroon)	DF	Joe Mbu	0	0	0	0	0	0	0	0	0	0
(Scotland)	DF	Brad McKay	1	0	0	0	0	0	0	0	1	0
(Scotland)	DF	Kevin McKinlay	7	1	1	0	1	0	3	1	12	2
(Scotland)	DF	Ross McMillan	5	0	0	0	0	0	0	0	5	0
(Scotland)	DF	Greg Ross	6	1	0	0	1	0	1	0	8	1
(Scotland)	MF	Craig Anderson	2	0	0	0	0	0	1	0	3	0
(Scotland)	MF	Ross Brash	1	0	0	0	0	0	0	0	1	0
(Scotland)	MF	Mark Corcoran	0	0	0	0	0	0	0	0	0	0
(Scotland)	MF	Sean Dickson	3	0	0	0	0	0	0	0	3	0
(Scotland)	MF	Brown Ferguson	2	1	0	0	0	0	0	0	2	1
(Scotland)	MF	Bryan Hodge	4	0	1	0	1	0	1	0	7	0
(Scotland)	MF	Jamie O'Grady	0	0	0	0	0	0	1	0	1	0
(Scotland)	MF	Eric Paton	0	0	0	0	0	0	0	0	0	0
(Scotland)	MF	Nick Phinn	0	0	0	0	0	0	0	0	0	0
(Scotland)	MF	Jamie Reid	2	0	0	0	0	0	0	0	2	0
(Scotland)	MF	David Rowson	5	0	0	0	0	0	0	0	5	0
(Scotland)	MF	Cieran Summers	0	0	0	0	0	0	0	0	0	0
(Scotland)	MF	Iain Thomson	5	0	1	0	2	0	2	0	10	0
(Scotland)	FW	Kieran Anderson	0	0	0	0	0	0	0	0	0	0
(Spain)	FW	Daniel Exposito-Hepburn	0	0	0	0	0	0	0	0	0	0
(Scotland)	FW	John Gemmell	5	1	0	1	1	0	0	0	6	2
(Scotland)	FW	Stewart Kean	0	0	0	0	1	0	0	0	1	0
(Algeria)	FW	Salim Kouider–Aissa	1	0	0	0	0	0	0	0	1	0
(Scotland)	FW	Stuart Love	0	0	0	0	0	0	0	0	0	0
(Scotland)	FW	Andy Rodgers	3	0	2	0	1	0	2	0	8	0
(Scotland)	FW	Owen Ronald	0	0	0	0	0	0	0	0	0	0
(Scotland)	FW	Darren Smith	1	0	0	0	0	0	0	0	1	0

== Team statistics ==
=== League table ===
Pos	Team	Pld	W	D	L	GF	GA	GD	Pts	Promotion, qualification or relegation
4	Forfar Athletic	36	17	3	16	67	74	−7	54	Qualification for the First Division play-offs
5	Arbroath	36	15	7	14	47	57	−10	52	
6	Stenhousemuir	36	12	13	11	59	59	0	49	
7	Ayr United	36	12	5	19	53	65	−12	41	
8	Stranraer	36	10	7	19	43	71	−28	37	

Source: SPFL Archive
Rules for classification: 1) points; 2) goal difference; 3) number of goals scored.

=== Division summary ===
Round	1	2	3	4	5	6	7	8	9	10	11	12	13	14	15	16	17	18	19	20	21	22	23	24	25	26	27	28	29	30	31	32	33	34	35	36
Ground	A	H	A	H	A	A	H	H	A	A	H	A	H	A	H	A	H	A	H	H	H	A	H	A	A	H	A	H	A	H	A	A	H	H	A	H
Result	D	W	D	L	W	D	D	W	D	L	D	L	L	D	W	L	L	L	W	D	W	L	W	D	W	D	L	D	D	L	D	W	W	W	W	L
Position	7	3	5	6	4	5	5	5	5	5	4	5	7	7	6	7	7	7	7	7	7	7	6	6	6	6	6	6	6	7	7	7	6	6	6	6

Updated to match(es) played on 12 May 2013. Source:
A = Away; H = Home; W = Win; D = Draw; L = Loss

== Transfers ==
=== Players in ===
Player	From	Fee
(Scotland) Greg Ross	(Scotland) Forfar Athletic	Free
(Scotland) John Gemmell	(Scotland) Albion Rovers	Free
(Scotland) Bryan Hodge	(Scotland) Brechin City	Free
(Scotland) Scott Buist	(Scotland) Brechin City	Free
(Scotland) Callum Reidford	(Scotland) Stirling Albion	Free
(Scotland) Craig Anderson	(Scotland) Civil Service Strollers	Free
(Scotland) Darren Smith	(Scotland) Stirling Albion	Free
(Scotland) Robbie Thomson	(Scotland) Celtic	Loan
(Scotland) Lee Kilday	(Scotland) Hamilton Academical	Loan
(Scotland) Brad McKay	(Scotland) Heart of Midlothian	Loan
(Scotland) Connor Fairley	(Iceland) Einherji	Free
(Scotland) David Rowson	(Scotland) Partick Thistle	Loan
(Scotland) Jamie Reid	(Scotland) Dundee	Loan
(Scotland) Mark Corcoran	(Scotland) Ross County	Free
(Scotland) David Rowson	(Scotland) Stenhousemuir	Free
(Cameroon) Joe Mbu	(Scotland) Cowdenbeath	Loan
(Scotland) Nicky Devlin	(Scotland) Motherwell	Loan
(Scotland) Chris Smith	(Scotland) St Mirren	Loan
(Algeria) Salim Kouider-Aissa	(Scotland) Motherwell	Free

=== Players out ===
Player	To	Fee
(Scotland) Stevie Murray	Free agent	Free
(Scotland) Willie Lyle	(Scotland) Auchinleck Talbot	Free
(Scotland) Martyn Corrigan	Free agent	Free
(Scotland) Paul McHale	Free agent	Free
(Scotland) Chris McCluskey	(Scotland) Albion Rovers	Free
(Scotland) Grant Plenderlieth	(Scotland) Sauchie	Free
(Scotland) Joe McCafferty	(Scotland) Shotts Bon Accord	Free
(Scotland) Michael Hunter	(Scotland) East Stirlingshire	Free
(Scotland) Jordan Burns	Free agent	Free
(Scotland) Sean Diamond	Free agent	Free
(Scotland) Sean Doherty	Free agent	Free
(Scotland) Dean McLean	Free agent	Free
(Scotland) Tom Nelson	Free agent	Free
(Scotland) Stephen Welsh	Free agent	Free
(Scotland) Scott Wilson	Free agent	Free
(Scotland) Alistair Brown	(Scotland) Ayr United	Free
(Scotland) Andy Rodgers	(Scotland) Peterhead	Loan
(Scotland) Ross Brash	(Scotland) Beith	Loan
(Scotland) Stuart Love	(Scotland) Sauchie	Loan
(Scotland) Eric Paton	Free agent	Free
(Scotland) Callum Reidford	Free agent	Free
(Scotland) Craig Anderson	(Scotland) Craigroyston	Loan
(Scotland) Jack Hamilton	(Scotland) East Stirlingshire	Loan
(Scotland) Alan Lawson	(Scotland) Bo'ness United	Loan
(Scotland) Kieran Anderson	(Scotland) Whitburn Junior	Loan
