= 2012–13 Berwick Rangers F.C. season =

Berwick Rangers
2012–13 season
- Chairman: Brian Porteous
- Manager: Ian Little
- Stadium: Shielfield Park
- Third Division: Fourth place
- Challenge Cup: First round, lost to Queen's Park
- League Cup: First round, lost to Raith Rovers
- Scottish Cup: Third round, lost to Stenhousemuir
- Top goalscorer: League: Darren Lavery (17); All: Darren Lavery (20)
- Highest home attendance: 4,476 vs Rangers Third Division, 23 February 2013
- Lowest home attendance: 372 vs Queen's Park Challenge Cup, 28 July 2012
- Average home league attendance: League: 917

The 2012–13 season was Berwick Rangers's eighth consecutive season in the Scottish Third Division, having been relegated from the Scottish Second Division at the end of the 2004–05 season. Berwick also competed in the Challenge Cup, League Cup and the Scottish Cup.

== Summary ==
=== Season ===
Berwick Rangers finished fourth in the Scottish Third Division, entering the play-offs losing 3–2 to East Fife on aggregate in the Semi-final. They reached the first round of the Challenge Cup, the first round of the League Cup and the third round of the Scottish Cup.

== Results & fixtures ==
Win Draw Loss Postponed

=== Pre-season ===
7 July 2012 Friendly	Berwick Rangers	P – P	Heart of Midlothian	Shielfield Park
14:00		Report

14 July 2012 Friendly	Berwick Rangers	P – P	Dunfermline Athletic	Shielfield Park
14:00		Report

21 July 2012 Friendly	Berwick Rangers	2 – 1	Livingston	Shielfield Park
14:00	Currie	Report	McNulty

24 July 2012 Friendly	Berwick Rangers	1 – 2	Dunfermline Athletic	Shielfield Park
19:30	Ferguson 3'	Report	Kirk 20' (Penalty); Barrowman	Attendance: 250; Referee: Salmond

=== Scottish Third Division ===
11 August 2012 Scottish Third Division	Berwick Rangers	0 – 0	Elgin City	Shielfield Park
15:00		SFL Report	Moore (red card) 23'	Attendance: 539; Referee: Hilland

18 August 2012 Scottish Third Division	Annan Athletic	3 – 2	Berwick Rangers	Galabank Stadium
15:00	Chaplain 56' (Penalty), 59'; Love 61'	SFL Report	Addison 14'; McLaren 25'	Attendance: 512; Referee: Ross

26 August 2012 Scottish Third Division	Berwick Rangers	1 – 1	Rangers	Shielfield Park
12:00	McLaren 62'	SFL Report	Little 45'	Attendance: 4,140; Referee: Tumilty

1 September 2012 Scottish Third Division	Berwick Rangers	3 – 0	East Stirlingshire	Shielfield Park
15:00	Lavery 11'; McLaren 39'; Hoskins 80'	SFL Report		Attendance: 520; Referee: Dallas

15 September 2012 Scottish Third Division	Montrose	3 – 1	Berwick Rangers	Links Park
15:00	McIntosh 29', 77'; Gray 31'	SFL Report	Lavery 45'	Attendance: 258; Referee: Robertson

22 September 2012 Scottish Third Division	Berwick Rangers	4 – 1	Stirling Albion	Shielfield Park
15:00	Currie 17'; Lavery 45'; Ferguson 62', 88'	SFL Report	White 75'	Attendance: 544; Referee: Ross

6 October 2012 Scottish Third Division	Peterhead	1 – 0	Berwick Rangers	Balmoor
15:00	Maguire 77'	SFL Report		Attendance: 455; Referee: Graham

20 October 2012 Scottish Third Division	Berwick Rangers	2 – 1	Clyde	Shielfield Park
15:00	Hoskins 43'; Notman 77'	SFL Report	Watt 41'; Gray (yellow card) 63' (yellow-red card)	Attendance: 546; Referee: Somers

27 October 2012 Scottish Third Division	Queen's Park	1 – 1	Berwick Rangers	Hampden Park
15:00	Quinn 34'	SFL Report	Lavery 32'	Attendance: 487; Referee: McKendrick

10 November 2012 Scottish Third Division	Elgin City	3 – 1	Berwick Rangers	Borough Briggs
15:00	Nicolson 16'; Leslie 25'; Wyness 90'	SFL Report	Gray 19'	Attendance: 790; Referee: Cook

17 November 2012 Scottish Third Division	Berwick Rangers	3 – 1	Annan Athletic	Shielfield Park
15:00	Lavery 24'; Gray 44'; Hoskins 54'	SFL Report	Ramage 90'	Attendance: 460; Referee: Anderson

25 November 2012 Scottish Third Division	East Stirlingshire	0 – 1	Berwick Rangers	Ochilview Park
15:00		SFL Report	Gray 22'; Notman (yellow card) 61' (red card)	Attendance: 327; Referee: Duncan

1 December 2012 Scottish Third Division	Berwick Rangers	1 – 4	Montrose	Shielfield Park
15:00	Lavery 9'	SFL Report	McIntosh 11'; Winter 22'; Johnston 80'; Young 84'	Attendance: 484; Referee: Aitken

8 December 2012 Scottish Third Division	Berwick Rangers	1 – 1	Peterhead	Shielfield Park
15:00	Lavery 58'	SFL Report	McLaughlin 26'	Attendance: 396; Referee: Robertson

15 December 2012 Scottish Third Division	Stirling Albion	6 – 3	Berwick Rangers	Forthbank Stadium
15:00	Day 17'; Thom 26'; White 37', 80' (Penalty); Ferry 45+2'; Weir 83'	SFL Report	Lavery 24'; Currie 30', 58'	Attendance: 427; Referee: Newlands

22 December 2012 Scottish Third Division	Berwick Rangers	P – P	Queen's Park	Shielfield Park
15:00		BBC Report

29 December 2012 Scottish Third Division	Clyde	2 – 1	Berwick Rangers	Broadwood Stadium
15:00	Brydon 50' (Own goal); Watt 89'	SFL Report	Carse 3'	Attendance: 427; Referee: Aitken

2 January 2013 Scottish Third Division	Montrose	1 – 3	Berwick Rangers	Links Park
15:00	Young 39'	SFL Report	Lavery 25'; McLaren 74'; McDonald 90+1'	Attendance: 434; Referee: Duncan

5 January 2013 Scottish Third Division	Berwick Rangers	2 – 0	East Stirlingshire	Shielfield Park
15:00	Lavery 10'; Easton 17'	SFL Report		Attendance: 473; Referee: Robertson

12 January 2013 Scottish Third Division	Rangers	4 – 2	Berwick Rangers	Ibrox Stadium
15:00	Little 9', 47', 74'; Templeton 53'	BBC; Sky Sports	Gray 65'; McLaren 73'	Attendance: 44,976; Referee: McLean

19 January 2013 Scottish Third Division	Berwick Rangers	P – P	Elgin City	Shielfield Park
15:00		BBC Report
Note: Postponed due to frozen pitch

26 January 2013 Scottish Third Division	Berwick Rangers	P – P	Stirling Albion	Shielfield Park
15:00		BBC Report
Note: Snow on pitch

2 February 2013 Scottish Third Division	Peterhead	1 – 1	Berwick Rangers	Balmoor
15:00	McAllister 5'	SFL Report	Lavery 6'	Attendance: 432; Referee: Roache

9 February 2013 Scottish Third Division	Berwick Rangers	3 – 3	Clyde	Shielfield Park
15:00	Lavery 46', 63'; McLaren 49'	SFL Report	Sharp 27'; Sweeney 58'; Scullion 79'	Attendance: 507; Referee: Newlands

16 February 2013 Scottish Third Division	Queen's Park	2 – 1	Berwick Rangers	Hampden Park
15:00	Longworth 24'; McParland 61'; Keenan (yellow card) 73' (yellow-red card)	SFL Report	Lavery 8'; McDonald (red card) 55'; Notman (yellow card) 83' (yellow-red card)	Attendance: 462; Referee: Walsh

23 February 2013 Scottish Third Division	Berwick Rangers	1 – 3	Rangers	Shielfield Park
12:00	Argyriou 6' (Own goal)	SFL Report	Shiels 9' (Penalty); Little 45+1'; Faure 66'	Attendance: 4,476; Referee: Murray

26 February 2013 Scottish Third Division	Berwick Rangers	2 – 1	Elgin City	Shielfield Park
19:45	Lavery 59'; Dalziel 74'	SFL Report	Gunn 3'	Attendance: 382; Referee: Hilland

2 March 2013 Scottish Third Division	Annan Athletic	2 – 2	Berwick Rangers	Galabank
15:00	Love 62'; Chaplain 70'	SFL Report	Dalziel 14'; McLaren 67'	Attendance: 427; Referee: Aitken

5 March 2013 Scottish Third Division	Berwick Rangers	1 – 0	Stirling Albion	Shielfield Park
19:45	Currie 87'	SFL Report		Attendance: 402; Referee: Anderson

9 March 2013 Scottish Third Division	Berwick Rangers	4 – 0	Montrose	Shielfield Park
14:00	McLaren 12', 52', 70'; Carse 90+1'	SFL Report	Crawford (yellow card) 69' (red card)	Attendance: 478; Referee: Steven

12 March 2013 Scottish Third Division	Berwick Rangers	2 – 0	Queen's Park	Shielfield Park
19:45	Easton 60'; Janczyk 76'	SFL Report		Attendance: 456; Referee: Muir

16 March 2013 Scottish Third Division	East Stirlingshire	0 – 3	Berwick Rangers	Ochilview Park
15:00		SFL Report	Miller 23' (Own goal); Dalziel 38'; McDonald 72'	Attendance: 248; Referee: Robertson

23 March 2013 Scottish Third Division	Berwick Rangers	0 – 2	Peterhead	Shielfield Park
15:00		SFL Report	McCann 51'; McAllister 84'	Attendance: 454; Referee: Graham

30 March 2013 Scottish Third Division	Stirling Albion	1 – 0	Berwick Rangers	Forthbank Stadium
15:00		SFL Report	Ferry 87'	Attendance: 601; Referee: Salmond

6 April 2013 Scottish Third Division	Clyde	2 – 1	Berwick Rangers	Broadwood Stadium
15:00	Watt 39'; Sweeney 86'	SFL Report	Notman 53'	Attendance: 472; Referee: Dallas

13 April 2013 Scottish Third Division	Berwick Rangers	4 – 1	Queen's Park	Shielfield Park
15:00	Notman 10', 50'; Lavery 13'; Currie 25'	SFL Report	Urquhart 4'	Attendance: 623; Referee: Tumilty

20 April 2013 Scottish Third Division	Elgin City	1 – 2	Berwick Rangers	Borough Briggs
15:00	Leslie 7' (Penalty)	SFL Report	Lavery 65'; McDonald 75'	Attendance: 870; Referee: Anderson

27 April 2013 Scottish Third Division	Berwick Rangers	0 – 2	Annan Athletic	Shielfield Park
15:00	Currie (yellow card) 87' (yellow-red card)	SFL Report	Chaplain 45'; McNiff 90+3'	Attendance: 627; Referee: Newlands

4 May 2013 Scottish Third Division	Rangers	1 – 0	Berwick Rangers	Ibrox Stadium
	Aird 32'	SFL Report		Attendance: 50,048; Referee: McKendrick

=== Second Division play-offs ===
8 May 2013 Play-offs SF R1	Berwick Rangers	1 – 1	East Fife	Shielfield Park
20:00	Lavery 72'	SFL Report	Muir 44'	Attendance: 732; Referee: Salmond

11 May 2013 Play-offs SF R2	East Fife	2 – 1 (a.e.t.) (3 – 2 agg.)	Berwick Rangers	Bayview Stadium
15:00	McDonald 78' (Own goal); Gormley 119'	SFL Report	Lavery 61' (Penalty)	Attendance: 856; Referee: Colvin

=== Scottish Challenge Cup ===
28 July 2012 Scottish Challenge Cup round 1	Berwick Rangers	2 – 2 (a.e.t.) (2 – 3 p)	Queen's Park	Shielfield Park
15:00	Janczyk 76'; McDonald 113'	SFL Report	Quinn 54', 101'	Attendance: 372; Referee: Robertson
	Penalties
	McDonald (penalty scored); Currie (penalty missed); Stevenson (penalty scored); McLaren (penalty missed); Addison (penalty missed); Miller (penalty missed)		Quinn (penalty missed); Keenan (penalty missed); Shankland (penalty scored); Longworth (penalty missed); Little (penalty scored); Parry (penalty scored)

=== Scottish League Cup ===
4 August 2012 Scottish League Cup round 1	Raith Rovers	4 – 3	Berwick Rangers	Stark's Park
15:00	Graham 25', 73'; Hill 58'; Clarke 85'	SFL Report	Currie 9', 65'; Addison 50'	Attendance: 1,071; Referee: Norris

=== Scottish Cup ===
29 September 2012 Scottish Cup round 2	Berwick Rangers	1 – 0	Wick Academy	Shielfield Park
15:00	Currie 84' (Penalty)	SKY Report		Attendance: 423; Referee: Campbell

3 November 2012 Scottish Cup round 3	Stenhousemuir	1 – 1	Berwick Rangers	Ochilview Park
15:00	Kean 78'; McKinlay (yellow card) 83' (yellow-red card)	BBC Report	Currie 32'	Attendance: 439; Referee: Robertson

13 November 2012 Scottish Cup round 3 Replay	Berwick Rangers	2 – 5	Stenhousemuir	Shielfield Park
19:45	Currie 11' (pen.), (yellow card) 87' (yellow-red card); Lavery 66'	BBC Report	Smith 39', 86'; Gemmell 48'; Kean 52', 56'	Attendance: 402; Referee: Robertson

== Player statistics ==
=== Squad ===
Last updated 13 May 2013

No.	Pos	Nat	Player	Total		Third Division		Other^{[a]}		League Cup		Scottish Cup	
No.	Pos	Nat	Player	Apps	Goals	Apps	Goals	Apps	Goals	Apps	Goals	Apps	Goals
	GK	(Scotland) SCO	Youssef Bejaoui	17	0	12+0	0	1+0	0	1+0	0	3+0	0
	GK	(Scotland) SCO	Marc McCallum	19	0	17+0	0	2+0	0	0+0	0	0+0	0
	GK	(England) ENG	Ian McCaldon	7	0	7+0	0	0+0	0	0+0	0	0+0	0
	DF	(Scotland) SCO	Ross Brady	0	0	0+0	0	0+0	0	0+0	0	0+0	0
	DF	(Scotland) SCO	Dean Droudge	4	0	4+0	0	0+0	0	0+0	0	0+0	0
	DF	(Scotland) SCO	Ross Gray	11	4	7+2	4	0+0	0	0+0	0	2+0	0
	DF	(South Africa) RSA	Devon Jacobs	40	0	30+3	0	3+0	0	1+0	0	3+0	0
	DF	(England) ENG	Marc Lancaster	3	0	2+0	0	0+0	0	1+0	0	0+0	0
	DF	(Scotland) SCO	Andy McLean	20	0	13+3	0	3+0	0	1+0	0	0+0	0
	DF	(Scotland) SCO	Steven Notman	32	4	24+3	4	2+0	0	0+0	0	3+0	0
	DF	(Scotland) SCO	Chris Townsley	36	0	32+0	0	1+0	0	0+0	0	3+0	0
	MF	(Scotland) SCO	Phil Addison	18	2	5+10	1	0+2	0	1+0	1	0+0	0
	MF	(Scotland) SCO	Dougie Brydon	34	0	28+1	0	1+0	0	1+0	0	3+0	0
	MF	(Scotland) SCO	Lee Currie	40	10	32+1	5	2+1	0	1+0	2	3+0	3
	MF	(Spain) ESP	Alberto Garcia Arena	0	0	0+0	0	0+0	0	0+0	0	0+0	0
	MF	(Scotland) SCO	Damian Gielty	36	0	24+6	0	3+0	0	1+0	0	0+2	0
	MF	(Scotland) SCO	Dean Hoskins	24	3	19+1	3	1+0	0	0+0	0	3+0	0
	MF	(Scotland) SCO	Neil Janczyk	36	2	27+3	1	3+0	1	1+0	0	2+0	0
	MF	(Scotland) SCO	Kevin McDonald	39	4	27+5	3	2+1	1	1+0	0	2+1	0
	MF	(Scotland) SCO	Fraser McLaren	37	10	24+7	10	3+0	0	1+0	0	2+0	0
	MF	(Scotland) SCO	Ben Miller	2	0	0+0	0	0+1	0	0+1	0	0+0	0
	MF	(Scotland) SCO	Craig Stevenson	4	0	0+2	0	0+1	0	0+1	0	0+0	0
	FW	(Scotland) SCO	Dean Carse	13	2	2+11	2	0+0	0	0+0	0	0+0	0
	FW	(Scotland) SCO	Scott Dalziel	19	3	11+6	3	2+0	0	0+0	0	0+0	0
	FW	(Scotland) SCO	Dylan Easton	18	2	13+3	2	1+1	0	0+0	0	0+0	0
	FW	(Scotland) SCO	John Ferguson	15	2	5+6	2	1+0	0	0+0	0	0+3	0
	FW	(Scotland) SCO	Darren Lavery	40	20	29+5	17	2+1	2	0+0	0	3+0	1
	FW	(Scotland) SCO	Ian Little	0	0	0+0	0	0+0	0	0+0	0	0+0	0
	FW	(Scotland) SCO	Stuart Noble	9	0	2+4	0	0+0	0	0+0	0	1+2	0
	FW	(Scotland) SCO	Kenny O'Brien	4	0	0+4	0	0+0	0	0+0	0	0+0	0
	FW	(Scotland) SCO	Greig Smith	1	0	0+1	0	0+0	0	0+0	0	0+0	0
	FW	(Scotland) SCO	Josh Morris	8	0	0+7	0	0+1	0	0+0	0	0+0	0

a. Includes other competitive competitions, including the play-offs and the Challenge Cup.

=== Disciplinary record ===
Includes all competitive matches.

Last updated 13 May 2013

Nation	Position	Name	Third Division		Other		League Cup		Scottish Cup		Total	
Nation	Position	Name	Yellow card	Red card	Yellow card	Red card	Yellow card	Red card	Yellow card	Red card	Yellow card	Red card
(Scotland)	GK	Youssef Bejaoui	0	0	0	0	0	0	0	0	0	0
(Scotland)	GK	Marc McCallum	1	0	0	0	0	0	0	0	1	0
(England)	GK	Ian McCaldon	0	0	0	0	0	0	0	0	0	0
(Scotland)	DF	Ross Brady	0	0	0	0	0	0	0	0	0	0
(Scotland)	DF	Dean Droudge	0	0	0	0	0	0	0	0	0	0
(Scotland)	DF	Ross Gray	2	0	0	0	0	0	0	0	2	0
(South Africa)	DF	Devon Jacobs	4	0	1	0	1	0	0	0	6	0
(England)	DF	Marc Lancaster	0	0	0	0	1	0	0	0	1	0
(Scotland)	DF	Andy McLean	0	0	0	0	0	0	0	0	0	0
(Scotland)	DF	Steven Notman	7	2	1	0	0	0	0	0	8	2
(Scotland)	DF	Chris Townsley	5	0	0	0	0	0	1	0	6	0
(Scotland)	MF	Phil Addison	0	0	0	0	0	0	0	0	0	0
(Scotland)	MF	Dougie Brydon	7	0	1	0	0	0	1	0	9	0
(Scotland)	MF	Lee Currie	10	1	2	0	0	0	2	1	14	2
(Spain)	MF	Alberto Garcia Arena	0	0	0	0	0	0	0	0	0	0
(Scotland)	MF	Damian Gielty	2	0	1	0	0	0	0	0	3	0
(Scotland)	MF	Dean Hoskins	5	0	1	0	0	0	0	0	6	0
(Scotland)	MF	Neil Janczyk	2	0	0	0	0	0	0	0	2	0
(Scotland)	MF	Kevin McDonald	3	1	2	0	0	0	0	0	5	1
(Scotland)	MF	Fraser McLaren	4	0	1	0	0	0	1	0	6	0
(Scotland)	MF	Craig Stevenson	0	0	0	0	0	0	0	0	0	0
(Scotland)	FW	Dean Carse	0	0	0	0	0	0	0	0	0	0
(Scotland)	FW	Scott Dalziel	2	0	0	0	0	0	0	0	2	0
(Scotland)	FW	Dylan Easton	4	0	0	0	0	0	0	0	4	0
(Scotland)	FW	John Ferguson	1	0	0	0	0	0	0	0	1	0
(Scotland)	FW	Darren Lavery	2	0	0	0	0	0	0	0	2	0
(Scotland)	FW	Ian Little	0	0	0	0	0	0	0	0	0	0
(Scotland)	FW	Stuart Noble	1	0	0	0	0	0	0	0	1	0
(Scotland)	FW	Kenny O'Brien	0	0	0	0	0	0	0	0	0	0
(Scotland)	FW	Greig Smith	0	0	0	0	0	0	0	0	0	0
(Scotland)	FW	Josh Morris	0	0	0	0	0	0	0	0	0	0

== Team statistics ==
=== League table ===
Pos	Team	Pld	W	D	L	GF	GA	GD	Pts	Promotion or qualification
2	Peterhead	36	17	8	11	52	28	+24	59	Qualification for the Second Division Play-offs
3	Queen's Park	36	16	8	12	60	54	+6	56	Qualification for the Second Division Play-offs
4	Berwick Rangers	36	14	7	15	59	55	+4	49	Qualification for the Second Division Play-offs
5	Elgin City	36	13	10	13	67	69	−2	49	
6	Montrose	36	12	11	13	60	68	−8	47	

Source: SPFL archive
Rules for classification: 1) points; 2) goal difference; 3) number of goals scored.

=== Division summary ===
Round	1	2	3	4	5	6	7	8	9	10	11	12	13	14	15	16	17	18	19	20	21	22	23	24	25	26	27	28	29	30	31	32	33	34	35	36
Ground	H	A	H	H	A	H	A	H	A	A	H	A	H	H	A	A	A	A	A	A	H	A	H	H	A	H	H	H	A	H	A	A	H	A	H	A
Result	D	L	D	W	L	W	L	W	D	L	W	W	L	D	L	L	W	W	L	D	D	L	L	W	D	W	W	W	W	L	L	L	W	W	L	L
Position	6	8	9	6	6	6	6	5	6	7	7	5	5	5	6	7	6	6	7	7	7	7	8	6	6	5	4	4	3	4	5	5	4	4	4	4

Updated to match(es) played on 9 May 2013. Source:
A = Away; H = Home; W = Win; D = Draw; L = Loss

== Transfers ==
=== Players in ===
Player	To	Fee
(Scotland) Youssef Bejaoui	(Scotland) Cowdenbeath	Free
(Scotland) Neil Janczyk	(Scotland) East Fife	Free
(Scotland) Dean Hoskins	(Scotland) Spartans	Free
(Scotland) Dougie Brydon	(Scotland) Duns	Free
(Scotland) Damian Gielty	(Luxembourg) Avenir Beggen	Free
(Scotland) Craig Stevenson	(Scotland) Lothian Thistle	Free
(Scotland) Dean Droudge	(Scotland) Cowdenbeath	Free
(England) Ian McCaldon	Free agent	Free
(Scotland) Darren Linton	(Scotland) Leith Athletic	Free
(Scotland) Nicholas Rendall	(Scotland) Alloa Athletic	Free
(Scotland) Craig Robertson	(Scotland) Tynecastle	Free
(Scotland) Grant Sandison	(Scotland) Alloa Athletic	Free
(Scotland) Greig Smith	(Scotland) Alloa Athletic	Free
(South Africa) Devon Jacobs	(Scotland) Stirling Albion	Free
(Scotland) Phil Addison	(Scotland) Hibernian	Free
(England) Marc Lancaster	(Scotland) Hibernian	Free
(Scotland) Ross Brady	(Scotland) Livingston	Free
(Scotland) Dean Carse	(Scotland) Aberdeen	Free
(Spain) Alberto Garcia Arena	(Spain) Atlético Mancha Real	Free
(Scotland) Ross Gray	(Scotland) Livingston	Loan
(Scotland) Marc McCallum	(Scotland) Dundee United	Loan
(Scotland) Dylan Easton	(Scotland) Livingston	Free
(Scotland) Scott Dalziel	(Scotland) Brechin City	Free

=== Players out ===
Player	To	Fee
(Scotland) David Greenhill	(Scotland) East Stirlingshire	Free
(Scotland) Jamie Barclay	(Scotland) Clyde	Free
(Scotland) Michael Deland	(Scotland) Newtongrange Star	Free
(Scotland) Elliott Smith	Free agent	Free
(Scotland) Stephen Thompson	(Scotland) Bonnyrigg Rose	Free
(Scotland) Richard Walker	Free agent	Free
(Scotland) Aaron Ponton	(Scotland) Musselburgh Athletic	Free
(Scotland) Darren Smith	Free agent	Free
(England) Damon Gray	(Scotland) Kelty Hearts	Free
(Scotland) Darren Gribben	(Scotland) Arbroath	Free
(Scotland) Chris McLeod	Free agent	Free
(Scotland) John Ferguson	(Scotland) Spartans	Free
(Scotland) Youssef Bejaoui	Free agent	Free
(Scotland) Stuart Noble	Free agent	Free
