= 2012–13 Peterhead F.C. season =

Peterhead
2012–13 season
- Chairman: Rodger Morrison
- Manager: Jim McInally
- Stadium: Balmoor
- Third Division: Second place
- Challenge Cup: First round, lost to East Fife
- League Cup: First round, lost to Dundee
- Scottish Cup: Second round, lost to Deveronvale
- Top goalscorer: League: Rory McAllister (21); All: Rory McAllister (23)

The 2012–13 season was Peterhead's second consecutive season in the Scottish Third Division, having been relegated from the Scottish Second Division at the end of the 2010–11 season. Peterhead also competed in the Challenge Cup, League Cup and the Scottish Cup.

== Results & fixtures ==
Win Draw Loss Postponed

=== Scottish Third Division ===
11 August 2012 Scottish Third Division	Peterhead	2 – 2	Rangers	Balmoor
12:45	McAllister 64'; McLaughlin 82'	BBC Report	McKay 27'; Little 90'	Attendance: 4,485; Referee: Finnie

18 August 2012 Scottish Third Division	Clyde	0 – 2	Peterhead	Recreation Park
15:00		SFL Report	Winters 20'; McAllister 29' (Penalty kick)	Attendance: 401; Referee: Robertson

25 August 2012 Scottish Third Division	Peterhead	1 – 0	Queen's Park	Balmoor
15:00	McAllister 82' (Penalty kick)	SFL Report		Attendance: 539; Referee: Dallas

1 September 2012 Scottish Third Division	Peterhead	2 – 0	Montrose	Balmoor
15:00	McAllister 52', 72'	SFL Report		Attendance: 509; Referee: Duncan

15 September 2012 Scottish Third Division	Elgin City	2 – 0	Peterhead	Borough Briggs
15:00	Moore 58' (Penalty), 66' (Penalty)	SFL Report	MacDonald (red card) 57'; Noble (yellow card) 73' (red card); Ross (yellow card) 89' (red card)	Attendance: 945; Referee: Ross

22 September 2012 Scottish Third Division	Annan Athletic	2 – 1	Peterhead	Galabank Stadium
15:00	Ramage 2'; Daly 56'	SFL Report	Bavidge 85'	Attendance: 484; Referee: Robertson

6 October 2012 Scottish Third Division	Peterhead	1 – 0	Berwick Rangers	Balmoor
15:00	Maguire 77'	SFL Report		Attendance: 455; Referee: Graham

20 October 2012 Scottish Third Division	East Stirlingshire	2 – 1	Peterhead	Ochilview Park
15:00	Turner 32', 51'	SFL Report	McAllister 2' (pen.); Ross (red card) 58'	Attendance: 296; Referee: Ross

27 October 2012 Scottish Third Division	Peterhead	2 – 2	Stirling Albion	Balmoor Stadium
15:00	Bavidge 10'; Smith 28'	SFL Report	White 31'; Flood 83'	Attendance: 508; Referee: Hilland

10 November 2012 Scottish Third Division	Rangers	2 – 0	Peterhead	Ibrox Stadium
15:00	McCulloch 43'; Wallace 66'	SFL Report		Attendance: 48,407; Referee: Charleston

17 November 2012 Scottish Third Division	Peterhead	1 – 0	Clyde	Balmoor Stadium
15:00	Winters 45'	SFL Report		Attendance: 514; Referee: Northcroft

24 November 2012 Scottish Third Division	Montrose	2 – 0	Peterhead	Links Park
15:00	Wood 4'; Masson 15'	SFL Report		Attendance: 479; Referee: Finnie

5 December 2012 Scottish Third Division	Peterhead	1 – 1	Elgin City	Balmoor Stadium
19:45	Cox 23'	SFL Report	Leslie 60'	Attendance: 225; Referee: Brines

8 December 2012 Scottish Third Division	Berwick Rangers	1 – 1	Peterhead	Shielfield Park
15:00	Lavery 58'	SFL Report	McLaughlin 26'	Attendance: 396; Referee: Robertson

15 December 2012 Scottish Third Division	Peterhead	2 – 0	Annan Athletic	Balmoor Stadium
15:00	McAllister 58'; Bavidge 84'	SFL Report		Attendance: 378; Referee: Roache

22 December 2012 Scottish Third Division	Stirling Albion	1 – 0	Peterhead	Forthbank Stadium
15:00	White 67' (Penalty); White (yellow card) 90+3' (yellow-red card)	SFL Report	Ross (red card) 17'	Attendance: 416; Referee: Duncan

29 December 2012 Scottish Third Division	Peterhead	2 – 0	East Stirlingshire	Balmoor Stadium
15:00	Bavidge 6'; Cox 73'	SFL Report		Attendance: 446; Referee: Anderson

2 January 2013 Scottish Third Division	Elgin City	0 – 3	Peterhead	Borough Briggs
15:00		SFL Report	Cox 19'; Strachan 38'; Winters 75'	Attendance: 880; Referee: Northcroft

5 January 2013 Scottish Third Division	Peterhead	0 – 1	Montrose	Balmoor
15:00		SFL Report	Johnston 3'	Attendance: 594; Referee: Newlands

12 January 2013 Scottish Third Division	Queen's Park	0 – 0	Peterhead	Hampden Park
15:00		SFL Report		Attendance: 584; Referee: Dallas

20 January 2013 Scottish Third Division	Peterhead	0 – 1	Rangers	Balmoor Stadium
12:00	McAllister (yellow card) 64' (yellow-red card)	BBC Report; Sky Report; SFL Report	Sandaza 30'	Attendance: 4,855; Referee: Tumilty

26 January 2013 Scottish Third Division	Annan Athletic	P – P	Peterhead	Galabank
15:00		BBC Report; SFL Report
Note: Pitch covered in snow

29 January 2013 Scottish Third Division	Annan Athletic	0 – 0	Peterhead	Galabank
19:30		SFL Report	Smith (red card) 82'	Attendance: 309; Referee: Colvin

2 February 2013 Scottish Third Division	Peterhead	1 – 1	Berwick Rangers	Balmoor
15:00	McAllister 5'	SFL Report	Lavery 6'	Attendance: 432; Referee: Roache

9 February 2013 Scottish Third Division	East Stirlingshire	2 – 4	Peterhead	Ochilview Park
15:00	Jackson 88'; Glasgow 90+1'	SFL Report	McAllister 22', 25'; Rodgers 29'; McLaughlin 31'	Attendance: 278; Referee: Steven

16 February 2013 Scottish Third Division	Peterhead	0 – 0	Stirling Albion	Balmoor
15:00		SFL Report	Allison (red card) 83'	Attendance: 466; Referee: Robertson

23 February 2013 Scottish Third Division	Peterhead	0 – 2	Queen's Park	Balmoor
15:00		SFL Report	Noble 12' (Own goal); Shankland 50'	Attendance: 479; Referee: Aitken

2 March 2013 Scottish Third Division	Clyde	2 – 0	Peterhead	Broadwood Stadium
15:00	Watt 65'; Sweeney 84' (Penalty)	SFL Report	Strachan (red card) 82'	Attendance: 558; Referee: Roache

9 March 2013 Scottish Third Division	Peterhead	0 – 1	Elgin City	Balmoor
15:00		SFL Report	Moore 9'	Attendance: 496; Referee: Hilland

16 March 2013 Scottish Third Division	Montrose	0 – 6	Peterhead	Links Park
15:00		SFL Report	McCann 7'; McAllister 18', 31', 88'; Rodgers 85', 90'	Attendance: 444; Referee: Cook

23 March 2013 Scottish Third Division	Berwick Rangers	0 – 2	Peterhead	Shielfield Park
15:00		SFL Report	McCann 51'; McAllister 84'	Attendance: 454; Referee: Graham

30 March 2013 Scottish Third Division	Peterhead	2 – 0	Annan Athletic	Balmoor
15:00	McAllister 70', 90'	SFL Report		Attendance: 483; Referee: Dallas

6 April 2013 Scottish Third Division	Peterhead	6 – 0	East Stirlingshire	Balmoor
15:00	McAllister 3', 40'; Bavidge 16'; Redman 17', 57'; Cowie 39'	SFL Report		Attendance: 456; Referee: Newlands

13 April 2013 Scottish Third Division	Stirling Albion	0 – 1	Peterhead	Forthbank Stadium
15:00		SFL Report	McAllister 34'	Attendance: 502; Referee: Cook

20 April 2013 Scottish Third Division	Rangers	1 – 2	Peterhead	Ibrox Stadium
15:00	McCulloch 12'	SFL Report	Ross 23'; McAllister 56'	Attendance: 43,961; Referee: Norris

27 April 2013 Scottish Third Division	Peterhead	3 – 0	Clyde	Balmoor
15:00	Rodgers 44', 48'; McAllister 69' (Penalty)	SFL Report	Bronsky (red card) 70'	Attendance: 560; Referee: Northcroft

4 May 2013 Scottish Third Division	Queen's Park	0 – 3	Peterhead	Hampden Park
12:45		SFL Report	Gilfillan 21'; Rodgers 52'; Cowie 79'	Attendance: 462; Referee: Robertson

=== Second Division play-offs ===
8 May 2013 Play-offs SF R1	Queen's Park	0 – 1	Peterhead	Hampden Park
		SFL Report	Rodgers 90+4'	Attendance: 651; Referee: McKendrick

11 May 2013 Play-offs SF R2	Peterhead	3 – 1 (4 – 1 agg.)	Queen's Park	Balmoor
	Cox 4', 10'; McAllister 64'; Strachan (red card) 80'	SFL Report	Shankland 87'	Attendance: 954; Referee: Robertson

15 May 2013 Play-offs Final R1	East Fife	0 – 0	Peterhead	Bayview Stadium
19:45		SFL Report		Attendance: 826; Referee: Beaton

19 May 2013 Play-offs Final R2	Peterhead	0 – 1 (0 – 1 agg.)	East Fife	Balmoor
15:00		SFL Report	Muir 48'	Attendance: 1,855; Referee: Clancy

=== Scottish Challenge Cup ===
28 July 2012 Scottish Challenge Cup round 1	Peterhead	1 – 2	East Fife	Balmoor
15:00	McAllister 75'	SFL Report	McBride 10' (Penalty kick); Samuel 54'	Attendance: 520; Referee: Aitken

=== Scottish League Cup ===
31 July 2012 Scottish League Cup round 1	Peterhead	0 – 0 (a.e.t.) (1 – 4 p)	Dundee	Balmoor
19:45		SFL Report		Attendance: 844; Referee: Brines
	Penalties
	McAllister (penalty scored); MacDonald (penalty missed); McLaughlin (penalty missed)		McBride (penalty scored); Baird (penalty scored); Irvine (penalty scored); Conroy (penalty scored)

=== Scottish Cup ===
29 September 2012 Scottish Cup round 2	Deveronvale	3 – 2	Peterhead	Princess Royal Park
15:00	Blackhall 7'; Rodger 9'; Fraser 37'; Lombardi (red card) 72'	Sky Sports	Smith 81'; Deasley 84'	Attendance: 542; Referee: Milne

== Player statistics ==
=== Squad ===
Last updated 17 May 2013

No.	Pos	Nat	Player	Total		Third Division		Other^{[a]}		League Cup		Scottish Cup	
No.	Pos	Nat	Player	Apps	Goals	Apps	Goals	Apps	Goals	Apps	Goals	Apps	Goals
	GK	(Scotland) SCO	Paul Jarvie	9	0	6+0	0	1+0	0	1+0	0	1+0	0
	GK	(Scotland) SCO	Marc McCallum	6	0	5+1	0	0+0	0	0+0	0	0+0	0
	GK	(Scotland) SCO	Graeme Smith	28	0	25+0	0	3+0	0	0+0	0	0+0	0
	DF	(Scotland) SCO	Greg Alexander	1	0	0+1	0	0+0	0	0+0	0	0+0	0
	DF	(Scotland) SCO	Ryan Harding	4	0	3+0	0	0+0	0	0+0	0	1+0	0
	DF	(Scotland) SCO	Callum MacDonald	9	0	6+0	0	1+0	0	1+0	0	1+0	0
	DF	(Scotland) SCO	Conner McGlinchey	11	0	3+7	0	0+1	0	0+0	0	0+0	0
	DF	(Scotland) SCO	Scott Ross	33	1	28+0	1	4+0	0	1+0	0	0+0	0
	DF	(Scotland) SCO	Ross Smith	35	2	29+2	1	3+0	0	0+0	0	1+0	1
	DF	(Scotland) SCO	Ryan Strachan	36	1	29+3	1	2+1	0	1+0	0	0+0	0
	DF	(Scotland) SCO	Craig Tully	3	0	0+3	0	0+0	0	0+0	0	0+0	0
	MF	(Scotland) SCO	Dean Cowie	40	2	33+1	2	4+0	0	1+0	0	1+0	0
	MF	(Scotland) SCO	Jake Fitzgerald	1	0	0+1	0	0+0	0	0+0	0	0+0	0
	MF	(Scotland) SCO	Bryan Gilfillan	15	1	7+5	1	3+0	0	0+0	0	0+0	0
	MF	(Scotland) SCO	Darren Kelly	4	0	0+4	0	0+0	0	0+0	0	0+0	0
	MF	(Scotland) SCO	Roy McBain	3	0	1+1	0	0+0	0	0+1	0	0+0	0
	MF	(Scotland) SCO	Ryan McCann	23	2	13+7	2	0+3	0	0+0	0	0+0	0
	MF	(Scotland) SCO	Scott McLaughlin	29	3	26+0	3	1+0	0	1+0	0	1+0	0
	MF	(Scotland) SCO	Steven Noble	41	0	35+0	0	4+0	0	1+0	0	1+0	0
	MF	(Scotland) SCO	Jamie Redman	40	2	34+0	2	4+0	0	1+0	0	1+0	0
	MF	(Scotland) SCO	Graeme Sharp	29	0	15+9	0	4+0	0	1+0	0	0+0	0
	FW	(Scotland) SCO	Martin Bavidge	30	5	14+14	5	0+1	0	0+0	0	1+0	0
	FW	(Scotland) SCO	David Cox	30	5	26+1	3	3+0	2	0+0	0	0+0	0
	FW	(Scotland) SCO	Bryan Deasley	16	1	2+11	0	1+0	0	0+1	0	0+1	1
	FW	(Scotland) SCO	Stephen Maguire	18	1	4+12	1	0+0	0	0+1	0	1+0	0
	FW	(Scotland) SCO	Rory McAllister	40	23	31+3	21	4+0	2	1+0	0	1+0	0
	FW	(Scotland) SCO	Andy Rodgers	17	7	9+5	6	2+1	1	0+0	0	0+0	0
	FW	(Scotland) SCO	Dave Ross	2	0	2+0	0	0+0	0	0+0	0	0+0	0
	FW	(Scotland) SCO	Robbie Winters	23	3	10+10	3	0+1	0	1+0	0	0+1	0

a. Includes other competitive competitions, including the play-offs and the Challenge Cup.

=== Disciplinary record ===
Includes all competitive matches.

Last updated 17 May 2013

Nation	Position	Name	Third Division		Other		League Cup		Scottish Cup		Total	
Nation	Position	Name	Yellow card	Red card	Yellow card	Red card	Yellow card	Red card	Yellow card	Red card	Yellow card	Red card
(Scotland)	GK	Paul Jarvie	0	0	0	0	0	0	0	0	0	0
(Scotland)	GK	Marc McCallum	1	0	0	0	0	0	0	0	1	0
(Scotland)	GK	Graeme Smith	1	0	0	0	0	0	0	0	1	0
(Scotland)	DF	Greg Alexander	0	0	0	0	0	0	0	0	0	0
(Scotland)	DF	Ryan Harding	0	0	0	0	0	0	0	0	0	0
(Scotland)	DF	Callum MacDonald	1	1	1	0	0	0	1	0	3	1
(Scotland)	DF	Conner McGlinchey	0	0	0	0	0	0	0	0	0	0
(Scotland)	DF	Scott Ross	5	3	1	0	0	0	0	0	6	3
(Scotland)	DF	Ross Smith	5	1	0	0	0	0	1	0	6	1
(Scotland)	DF	Ryan Strachan	8	1	0	1	0	0	0	0	8	2
(Scotland)	DF	Craig Tully	0	0	0	0	0	0	0	0	0	0
(Scotland)	MF	Dean Cowie	9	0	1	0	0	0	0	0	10	0
(Scotland)	MF	Jake Fitzgerald	0	0	0	0	0	0	0	0	0	0
(Scotland)	MF	Bryan Gilfillan	1	0	1	0	0	0	0	0	2	0
(Scotland)	MF	Darren Kelly	0	0	0	0	0	0	0	0	0	0
(Scotland)	MF	Roy McBain	1	0	0	0	0	0	0	0	1	0
(Scotland)	MF	Ryan McCann	4	0	0	0	0	0	0	0	4	0
(Scotland)	MF	Scott McLaughlin	7	0	0	0	0	0	0	0	7	0
(Scotland)	MF	Steven Noble	4	1	0	0	0	0	0	0	4	1
(Scotland)	MF	Jamie Redman	2	0	2	0	0	0	0	0	4	0
(Scotland)	MF	Graeme Sharp	3	0	0	0	1	0	0	0	4	0
(Scotland)	FW	Martin Bavidge	0	0	0	0	0	0	0	0	0	0
(Scotland)	FW	David Cox	4	0	0	0	0	0	0	0	4	0
(Scotland)	FW	Bryan Deasley	2	0	0	0	0	0	1	0	3	0
(Scotland)	FW	Stephen Maguire	0	0	0	0	0	0	0	0	0	0
(Scotland)	FW	Rory McAllister	8	1	1	0	0	0	0	0	9	1
(Scotland)	FW	Andy Rodgers	1	0	1	0	0	0	0	0	2	0
(Scotland)	FW	Dave Ross	0	0	0	0	0	0	0	0	0	0
(Scotland)	FW	Robbie Winters	1	0	0	0	0	0	0	0	1	0

=== Awards ===
Last updated 28 September 2012

Nation	Name	Award	Month
(Scotland)	Jim McInally	Third Division Manager of the Month	August

== Team statistics ==
=== League table ===
Pos	Team	Pld	W	D	L	GF	GA	GD	Pts	Promotion or qualification
1	Rangers (C, P)	36	25	8	3	87	29	+58	83	Promotion to League One
2	Peterhead	36	17	8	11	52	28	+24	59	Qualification for the Second Division Play-offs
3	Queen's Park	36	16	8	12	60	54	+6	56	Qualification for the Second Division Play-offs
4	Berwick Rangers	36	14	7	15	59	55	+4	49	Qualification for the Second Division Play-offs
5	Elgin City	36	13	10	13	67	69	−2	49	

Source: SPFL archive
Rules for classification: 1) points; 2) goal difference; 3) number of goals scored.
(C) Champions; (P) Promoted

=== Division summary ===
Round	1	2	3	4	5	6	7	8	9	10	11	12	13	14	15	16	17	18	19	20	21	22	23	24	25	26	27	28	29	30	31	32	33	34	35	36
Ground	H	A	H	H	A	A	H	A	H	A	H	A	H	A	H	A	H	A	H	A	H	A	H	A	H	H	A	H	A	A	H	H	A	A	H	A
Result	D	W	W	W	L	L	W	L	D	L	W	L	D	D	W	L	W	W	L	D	L	D	D	W	D	L	L	L	W	W	W	W	W	W	W	W
Position	4	2	2	1	2	2	2	4	4	6	3	5	6	6	4	5	4	2	4	3	4	4	4	3	3	4	4	5	5	5	4	3	2	2	2	2

Updated to match(es) played on 17 May 2013. Source:
A = Away; H = Home; W = Win; D = Draw; L = Loss

== Transfers ==
=== Players in ===
Player	To	Fee
(Scotland) Steven Noble	(Scotland) Stranraer	Free
(Scotland) Darren Kelly	(Scotland) Newburgh	Free
(Scotland) Ross Smith	(Scotland) Dundee United	Loan
(Scotland) Scott McLaughlin	(Scotland) Queen of the South	Free
(Scotland) Robbie Winters	(Scotland) Alloa Athletic	Free
(Scotland) Dean Cowie	(Scotland) Fraserburgh	Free
(Scotland) Stephen Maguire	(Scotland) Thorniewood United	Free
(Scotland) Ryan Harding	(Scotland) Alloa Athletic	Loan
(Scotland) David Cox	(Scotland) Alloa Athletic	Loan
(Scotland) Graeme Smith	(Scotland) St Mirren	Free
(Scotland) David Cox	(Scotland) Alloa Athletic	Free
(Scotland) Ryan McCann	(Iceland) Einherji	Free
(Scotland) Andy Rodgers	(Scotland) Stenhousemuir	Loan
(Scotland) Conner McGlinchey	(Scotland) Hamilton Academical	Free

=== Players out ===
Player	To	Fee
(Scotland) Raymond Jellema		Free
(Scotland) Neil Duffy	(Scotland) Longside	Free
(Scotland) Alan Rattray	(Scotland) Ballingry Rovers	Free
(Scotland) Paul Watson		Free
(Scotland) Aaron Conway		Free
(Scotland) David Donald		Free
(Scotland) Dennis Wyness	(Scotland) Elgin City	Free
(Scotland) Lewis Davidson		Free
(Scotland) Paul Young		Free
(Scotland) Ross Salmon	(Scotland) Sunnybank	Free
(Scotland) Roy McBain	(Scotland) Cove Rangers	Loan
(Scotland) Roy McBain	(Scotland) Cove Rangers	Free
(Scotland) Robbie Winters	(Scotland) Dumbarton	Free

== See also ==
- List of Peterhead F.C. seasons
