= 2012–13 Scottish Challenge Cup =

Tournament details
- Country: Scotland
- Teams: 32

Final positions
- Champions: Queen of the South
- Runners-up: Partick Thistle

Tournament statistics
- Matches played: 31
- Goals scored: 108 (3.48 per match)

The 2012–13 Scottish Challenge Cup, known as the Ramsdens Challenge Cup due to sponsorship reasons with Ramsdens, was the 22nd season of the competition. It was competed for by 32 clubs, which included the 30 members of the 2012–13 Scottish Football League, and for the second season running, the top two Highland Football League clubs with a valid SFA club licence.

The defending champions were Falkirk, who defeated Hamilton Academical in the 2012 final; who lost 1–0 to Rangers in the Second round.

Inverurie Loco Works who finished fourth and Wick Academy eighth in the Highland Football League qualified for the competition for the first time after being asked to compete following their work in the SFA's Club Licensing programme. Clubs ranked higher such as Forres Mechanics were not compliant with the programme so the qualification spot moved to a lower ranked club. Buckie Thistle and Deveronvale were ruled out as they had been invited in the previous season's competition.

== Schedule ==
Round	First match date	Fixtures	Clubs
First round	Sat 28/Sun 29 July 2012	16	32 → 16
Second round	Tue 14/Wed 15 August 2012	8	16 → 8
Quarter-finals	Sunday 9 September 2012	4	8 → 4
Semi-finals	Sunday 14 October 2012	2	4 → 2
Final	Sunday 7 April 2013	1	2 → 1

== Fixtures and results ==
=== First round ===
The first round draw was conducted on 12 June 2012 at the Falkirk Stadium, the home of the reigning champions Falkirk F.C., by former player Kevin McAllister and Ramsden's representative Stewart Smith. Like the previous season, the first round is separated regionally into two sections: north and east and south and west. After the draw was made, Rangers F.C. were placed in Division 3 of the SFL, being replaced in the SPL by Dundee FC. Following this change, Dundee's place in the competition was taken by Rangers.

==== North and East Region ====
29 July 2012	Brechin City	1–2 (a.e.t.)	Rangers	Glebe Park, Brechin
15:05	Jackson 43'		Little 4'; McCulloch 102'	Attendance: 4070; Referee: George Salmond

28 July 2012	Falkirk	3–0	Stirling Albion	Falkirk Stadium, Falkirk
15:00	Duffie 34'; Taylor 51', 57'			Attendance: 1532; Referee: John McKendrick

28 July 2012	Montrose	4–2	Inverurie Loco Works	Links Park, Montrose
15:00	Watson 28'; Boyle 60'; Wood 66'; Masson 81'		Mackay 16'; Souter 88'	Attendance: 401; Referee: Kevin Graham

28 July 2012	Peterhead	1–2	East Fife	Balmoor Stadium, Peterhead
15:00	McAllister 75'	Greg Aitken	McBride 10' (pen.); Samuel 54'

28 July 2012	Elgin City	5–7	Arbroath	Borough Briggs, Elgin
15:00	Gunn 19'; Leslie 50', 89'; Moore 52'; Wyness 87'		Sibanda 16', 27', 43'; Doris 21'; Gribben 45', 66', 71' (pen.)	Referee: Brian Colvin

28 July 2012	Forfar Athletic	3–2	Dunfermline Athletic	Station Park, Forfar
15:00	Kader 13'; Denholm 53'; Swankie 66'		Wallace 16'; Barrowman 35'	Referee: Kevin Clancy

28 July 2012	Wick Academy	2–4	Raith Rovers	Harmsworth Park, Wick
15:00	Geruzel 51'; Allan 61'		Graham 39'; Hill 57'; Anderson 71'; Clarke 83'	Referee: David Somers

28 July 2012	Cowdenbeath	1–1 (a.e.t.) (3–1 p)	Alloa Athletic	Central Park, Cowdenbeath
15:00	Coult 2'		Gordon 20'	Referee: Bobby Madden

Source: Scottish Football League

==== South and West Region ====
28 July 2012	East Stirlingshire	3–1	Ayr United	Ochilview Park, Stenhousemuir
15:00	Herd 28', 42'; Maxwell 86'		Shankland 51'	Referee: Barry Cook

28 July 2012	Greenock Morton	2–0	Albion Rovers	Cappielow, Greenock
15:00	Wallace 48'; O'Brien 59'			Attendance: 1,268; Referee: John Beaton

28 July 2012	Berwick Rangers	2–2 (a.e.t.) (2–3 p)	Queen's Park	Shielfield Park, Berwick-upon-Tweed
15:00	Janczyk 76'; McDonald 113'		Quinn 54', 101'	Referee: Don Robertson

28 July 2012	Dumbarton	0–1	Queen of the South	Dumbarton Football Stadium, Dumbarton
15:00			Clark 69'	Referee: Gary Hilland

28 July 2012	Hamilton Academical	0–1	Airdrie United	New Douglas Park, Hamilton
15:00			McLaren 85'	Referee: Craig Charleston

28 July 2012	Stranraer	1–2	Stenhousemuir	Stair Park, Stranraer
15:00	Winter 71'		Gemmell 36'; Ferguson 86'	Referee: Des Roache

28 July 2012	Annan Athletic	1–0	Livingston	Galabank, Annan
15:00	Bell 74'	Paul Robertson

28 July 2012	Clyde	0–1	Partick Thistle	Recreation Park, Alloa
15:00			Doolan 73'	Referee: Alan Muir

Source: Scottish Football League

=== Second round ===
The second round draw was conducted on 30 July 2012, at the Ramsdens store in the Forge Shopping Centre in Glasgow.

==== North and East Region ====
14 August 2012	Cowdenbeath	3–0	East Fife	Central Park, Cowdenbeath
19:45	Stevenson 44', 73'; Miller 67'

14 August 2012	Raith Rovers	5–2	Montrose	Stark's Park, Kirkcaldy
19:45	Walker 8'; Graham 34', 54'; Clarke 44'; Spence 90'		Watson 45' (pen.); Young 77'

14 August 2012	Arbroath	3–2	Forfar Athletic	Gayfield Park, Arbroath
19:45	Currie 21'; Gribben 34', 37'		Swankie 29'; Gibson 43'

21 August 2012	Falkirk	0–1	Rangers	Falkirk Stadium, Falkirk
19:45			Little 45'

Source: Scottish Football League

==== South and West Region ====
14 August 2012	Annan Athletic	0–3	Stenhousemuir	Galabank, Annan
19:30			Kean 29'; Dickson 32'; Rodgers 59'

14 August 2012	Queen's Park	4–5	Partick Thistle	Hampden Park, Glasgow
19:30	Shankland 19'; Longworth 53'; Quinn 78'; Little 85'		Sinclair 35'; Elliot 40'; Erskine 64', 90'; Bannigan 89'

14 August 2012	Greenock Morton	1–2 (a.e.t.)	Queen of the South	Cappielow, Greenock
19:30	Tidser 39'		Durnan 66'; Clark 105'

14 August 2012	East Stirlingshire	3–0	Airdrie United	Ochilview Park, Stenhousemuir
19:45	Maxwell 23'; Turner 37'; Herd 90'

Source: Scottish Football League

=== Quarter-finals ===
The quarter-final draw was conducted on 22 August 2012, at Hampden Park in Glasgow.

9 September 2012	Arbroath	1–0	Stenhousemuir	Gayfield Park, Arbroath
15:00	Robertson 34'

9 September 2012	East Stirlingshire	1–2	Cowdenbeath	Ochilview Park, Stenhousemuir
15:00	Kelly 24'		McKenzie 10'; Adamson 40'

9 September 2012	Partick Thistle	3–0	Raith Rovers	Firhill Stadium, Glasgow
16:05	Erskine 50', 58'; Craig 53'

18 September 2012	Rangers	2–2 (a.e.t.) (3–4 p)	Queen of the South	Ibrox Stadium, Glasgow
19:45	McKay 55'; McCulloch 72' (pen.)		Clark 49'; Reilly 90'	Attendance: 23,932; Referee: O'Reilly

Source: Scottish Football League

=== Semi-finals ===
The semi-final draw was conducted on 19 September 2012, at Hampden Park in Glasgow.

14 October 2012	Cowdenbeath	0–1	Partick Thistle	Central Park, Cowdenbeath
16:05			Craig 74'

14 October 2012	Queen of the South	2–1 (a.e.t.)	Arbroath	Palmerston Park, Dumfries
15:00	Young 9'; McGuffie 117'		Keddie 58'

Source: Scottish Football League

=== Final ===
7 April 2013
16:05 BST

Partick Thistle	1–1 (a.e.t.)	Queen of the South
Penalties
	5–6
