= 2012–13 Scottish League Cup =

2012–13 Scottish Communities League Cup
Tournament details
- Country: Scotland
- Dates: 4 August 2012 – 17 March 2013
- Teams: 42

Final positions
- Champions: St Mirren
- Runners-up: Heart of Midlothian

The 2012–13 Scottish League Cup was the 67th season of Scotland's second-most prestigious football knockout competition. It is also known as the Scottish Communities League Cup for sponsorship reasons, after the Scottish Government continued their 1.7 million sponsorship for a second season.

== Format ==
The competition is a single elimination knock-out competition. In each round, fixtures are determined by random draw, with the first to third rounds seeded according to last season's league positions (higher 50% of finishers drawn v lower 50% of finishers, alternating which is at home with each tie drawn).

Fixtures are played to a finish, with extra time and then penalties used in the event of draws. The competition is open to all clubs in the Scottish Premier League and Scottish Football League. Clubs involved in European competitions are given a bye to the third round in order to avoid congestion of fixtures.

- First round: 28 of the 30 sides from the previous season's Scottish Football League enter, except Ross County and Dunfermline. After Rangers were placed into the Third Division, they entered at this round.
- Second round: The 15 winners of the first round are joined by 6 of the 7 of last season's SPL sides not in Europe, plus newly promoted Ross County.
- Third round: The 11 winners of the second round are joined by the five SPL sides participating in European competition.
- Quarter-finals: The 8 winners of the third round play.
- Semi-finals: The 4 winners of the quarter-finals play.
- Final: The 2 winners of the semi-finals play.

== Schedule ==
- Round 1: Saturday 4 August
- Round 2: Tuesday 28/Wednesday 29 August
- Round 3: Tuesday 25/Wednesday 26 September
- Quarter-Finals: Tuesday 30/Wednesday 31 October
- Semi-Finals: Saturday 26/Sunday 27 January 2013
- Final: Sunday 17 March 2013

== Fixtures and results ==
=== First round ===
The first round draw was conducted on 20 July 2012 at Ochilview Park, Stenhousemuir by the First Minister of Scotland, Alex Salmond. Rangers were entered into the draw pending an application for membership of the Scottish Football Association, which is needed to participate.

31 July 2012	Peterhead	0 – 0 (a.e.t.) (1 – 4 p)	Dundee	Balmoor Stadium
19:45		BBC Sport		Attendance: 844; Referee: Brines
	Penalties
	McAllister (penalty scored); MacDonald (penalty missed); McLaughlin (penalty missed)		McBride (penalty scored); Baird (penalty scored); Irvine (penalty scored); Conroy (penalty scored)

4 August 2012	Queen of the South	5 – 2	Alloa Athletic	Palmerston Park
15:00	Mitchell 9'; Higgins 67'; Clark 83', 85'; Lyle 89'	BBC Sport	Gordon 64'; Grehan 78'	Attendance: 967; Referee: Colvin

4 August 2012	Stranraer	0 – 8	Livingston	Stair Park
15:00		BBC Sport	Morton 17', 87'; McNulty 23', 66', 83'; Russell 39', 80'; McCann 62'	Attendance: 284; Referee: Hilland

4 August 2012	Raith Rovers	4 – 3	Berwick Rangers	Stark's Park
15:00	Graham 25', 73'; Hill 58'; Clarke 85'	BBC Sport	Currie 9', 65'; Addison 50'	Attendance: 1,071; Referee: Norris

4 August 2012	Stenhousemuir	4 – 0	Brechin City	Ochilview Park
15:00	Gemmell 1'; Smith 76', 90'; Kean 88' (pen.)	BBC Sport		Attendance: 282; Referee: Somers

4 August 2012	Montrose	2 – 1	Cowdenbeath	Links Park
15:00	Boyle 31'; Watson 43'	BBC Sport	McKenzie 90'	Attendance: 312; Referee: Roache

4 August 2012	Ayr United	6 – 1	Clyde	Somerset Park
15:00	Winters 48'; Moffat 59', 90' (pen.); Tiffoney 63'; Sinclair 68', 90'	BBC Sport	Neill 82'	Attendance: 1,022; Referee: Anderson

4 August 2012	Queen's Park	3 – 2 (a.e.t.)	Airdrie United	Firhill Stadium
15:00	Brough 60', 104'; Shankland 88'	BBC Sport	Blockley 47'; Cook 66'	Attendance: 622; Referee: Finnie

4 August 2012	Dumbarton	2 – 0	Albion Rovers	Dumbarton Football Stadium
15:00	Prunty 45'; Lister 84'	BBC Sport		Attendance: 479; Referee: Salmond

4 August 2012	Forfar Athletic	0 – 2	Partick Thistle	Station Park
15:00		BBC Sport	Erskine 18'; Lawless 37'	Attendance: 693; Referee: Northcroft

4 August 2012	Falkirk	2 – 0	Elgin City	Falkirk Stadium
15:00	Kingsley 67'; Taylor 89'	BBC Sport		Attendance: 1,594; Referee: Allan

4 August 2012	Hamilton Academical	2 – 0	Annan Athletic	New Douglas Park
15:00	Routledge 66'; MacKinnon 80'	BBC Sport		Attendance: 620; Referee: Collum

4 August 2012	Arbroath	1 – 1 (a.e.t.) (3 – 2 p)	Stirling Albion	Gayfield Park
15:00	Currie 83'	BBC Sport	Ferry 42' (pen.)	Attendance: 579; Referee: Robertson
	Penalties
	Doris (penalty scored); Holmes (penalty scored); Sheerin (penalty missed); Currie (penalty scored)		(penalty missed) Weir; (penalty scored) Davidson; (penalty scored) McSorley; (penalty missed) Ferry; (penalty missed) Ashe

5 August 2012	East Stirlingshire	1 – 5	Greenock Morton	Ochilview Park
15:00	Herd 34'	BBC Sport	McLaughlin 1'; Weatherson 11'; Stirling 37'; Wallace 67'; Tidser 86'	Attendance: 581; Referee: Beaton

7 August 2012	Rangers	4 – 0	East Fife	Ibrox Stadium
19:45	McCulloch 15', 62'; Shiels 34'; Wallace 47'	BBC Sport		Attendance: 38,160; Referee: McKendrick

=== Second round ===
The Second round draw was conducted on 9 August 2012.

22 August 2012	Greenock Morton	0 – 2 (a.e.t.)	Aberdeen	Cappielow
19:30		BBC Sport	Rae 109'; Vernon 115'	Attendance: 2,817; Referee: Brines

28 August 2012	Dunfermline Athletic	3 – 0	Montrose	East End Park
19:45	Barrowman 4', 64'; Wallace 41'	BBC Sport		Attendance: 903; Referee: Salmond

28 August 2012	Hamilton Academical	1 – 0 (a.e.t.)	Partick Thistle	New Douglas Park
19:45	Crawford 107'	BBC Sport		Attendance: 1,268; Referee: O'Reilly

28 August 2012	Kilmarnock	1 – 2	Stenhousemuir	Rugby Park
19:45	Nelson 90'	BBC Sport	Ferguson 20' (pen.); Gemmell 43'	Attendance: 2,538; Referee: Collum

28 August 2012	Livingston	3 – 2 (a.e.t.)	Dumbarton	Braidwood Motor Company Stadium
19:45	Russell 39'; Barr 96'; Easton 102'	BBC Sport	Lister 36'; Gilhaney 110'	Attendance: 493; Referee: Crawford

28 August 2012	Ross County	1 – 4	Raith Rovers	Global Energy Stadium
19:45	Duncan 84'	BBC Sport	Spence 25'; Graham 41', 63'; Hill 51'	Attendance: 1,147; Referee: McKendrick

28 August 2012	Queen of the South	2 – 0	Hibernian	Palmerston Park
19:45	Clark 13'; Reilly 42'	BBC Sport		Attendance: 2,658; Referee: Madden

29 August 2012	Arbroath	0 – 2	Inverness CT	Gayfield Park
19:45		BBC Sport	Shinnie 7', 71'	Attendance: 672; Referee: Finnie

29 August 2012	St Mirren	5 – 1	Ayr United	St Mirren Park
19:45	Guy 16'; Thompson 24'; McGowan 30'; McLean 38' (pen.); Teale 58'	BBC Sport	Moffat 39'	Attendance: 2,306; Referee: Tumilty

29 August 2012	Queen's Park	2 – 1	Dundee	Hampden Park
19:45	Longworth 24' (pen.); Burns 76'	BBC Sport	Milne 5'	Attendance: 707; Referee: Colvin

30 August 2012	Rangers	3 – 0	Falkirk	Ibrox Stadium
19:45	McCulloch 18', 52'; Little 32'	BBC Sport		Attendance: 26,450; Referee: Muir

=== Third round ===
The third round draw took place on 3 September 2012. The matches were played on Tuesday 25 or Wednesday 26 September 2012.

25 September 2012	Celtic	4 – 1	Raith Rovers	Celtic Park
19:45	Hooper 12', 37', 58', 60'	BBC Sport	Walker 28'	Attendance: 14,737; Referee: Muir

25 September 2012	Heart of Midlothian	3 – 1	Livingston	Tynecastle Stadium
19:45	Grainger 45'; Žaliūkas 70', 74'	BBC Sport	McNulty 56'	Attendance: 6,322; Referee: McLean

25 September 2012	Queen of the South	0 – 1	Dundee United	Palmerston Park
19:45		BBC Sport	Russell 28'	Attendance: 2,374; Referee: Norris

25 September 2012	St Johnstone	4 – 1	Queen's Park	McDiarmid Park
19:45	MacLean 18', 40'; Davidson 76'; Craig 85'	BBC Sport	Keenan 30'	Attendance: 1,304; Referee: Clancy

25 September 2012	St Mirren	1 – 0	Hamilton Academical	St Mirren Park
19:45	Mair 90'	BBC Sport		Attendance: 1,914; Referee: Allan

25 September 2012	Stenhousemuir	1 – 1 (a.e.t.) (5 – 6 p)	Inverness CT	Ochilview Park
19:45	Ferguson 40' (pen.)	BBC Sport	McKay 23'	Attendance: 705; Referee: Madden
	Penalties
	Ferguson (penalty scored); Rodgers (penalty scored); Hodge (penalty missed); Gemmell (penalty scored); McMillan (penalty scored); Kean (penalty scored); Smith (penalty missed)		Foran (penalty missed); Shinnie (penalty scored); Morrison (penalty scored); Doran (penalty scored); Shinnie (penalty scored); Draper (penalty scored); Roberts (penalty scored)

26 September 2012	Rangers	2 – 0	Motherwell	Ibrox Stadium
19:15	McCulloch 50'; Shiels 56'	BBC Sport		Attendance: 29,413; Referee: Murray

26 September 2012	Dunfermline Athletic	0 – 1	Aberdeen	East End Park
19:45		BBC Sport	Vernon 90'	Attendance: 3,057; Referee: Beaton

=== Quarter-finals ===
The quarter-final draw took place on 4 October 2012. The matches were played on Tuesday 30 or Wednesday 31 October 2012.

30 October 2012	Aberdeen	2 – 2 (a.e.t.) (2−4 p)	St Mirren	Pittodrie Stadium
19:45	Vernon 22'; Magennis 90'	BBC Sport	Parkin 6'; McLean 69'	Attendance: 7,610; Referee: Allan Crawford
	Penalties
	Hughes (penalty missed); McGinn (penalty scored); Hayes (penalty scored); Smith (penalty missed)		(penalty scored) McLean; (penalty scored) Teale; (penalty scored) Goodwin; (penalty scored) McAusland

30 October 2012	Celtic	5 – 0	St Johnstone	Celtic Park
19:45	Commons 28', 32', 57' (pen.); Hooper 38'; Mulgrew 61'	BBC Sport		Attendance: 14,399; Referee: Bobby Madden

31 October 2012	Dundee United	1 – 1 (a.e.t.) (4−5 p)	Heart of Midlothian	Tannadice Park
19:15	Russell 35'	BBC Sport	Paterson 21'	Attendance: 3,789; Referee: Calum Murray
	Penalties
	Russell (penalty scored); Mackay-Steven (penalty missed); Rankin (penalty missed); Gunning (penalty scored); McLean (penalty scored); Armstrong (penalty scored); Dillon (penalty missed)		(penalty missed) Grainger; (penalty missed) Sutton; (penalty scored) Webster; (penalty scored) Driver; (penalty scored) R. McGowan; (penalty scored) Robinson; (penalty scored) Žaliūkas

31 October 2012	Rangers	0 – 3	Inverness CT	Ibrox Stadium
19:45		BBC Sport	A Shinnie 27'; Warren 59'; G Shinnie 79' (pen.)	Attendance: 28,033; Referee: Steven McLean

=== Semi-finals ===
The semi-final draw took place on 8 November 2012. The first match was played on Saturday 26 and the second was played on Sunday 27 January 2013.

26 January 2013	Inverness CT	1 – 1 (a.e.t.) (4–5 p)	Heart of Midlothian	Easter Road
15:00	Andrew Shinnie 49'	BBC Sport	Michael Ngoo 66'	Attendance: 16,326; Referee: Euan Norris
	Penalties
	Graeme Shinnie (penalty scored); Andrew Shinnie (penalty scored); Billy McKay (penalty scored); Owain Tudur Jones (penalty scored); Philip Roberts (penalty missed)		Marius Zaliukas (penalty scored); Michael Ngoo (penalty scored); Andy Webster (penalty scored); Arvydas Novikovas (penalty scored); Mehdi Taouil (penalty scored)

27 January 2013	St Mirren	3 – 2	Celtic	Hampden Park
14:30	Gonçalves 8'; McGowan 63' (pen.); Thompson 69'	BBC Sport	Hooper 45'; Mulgrew 90+3'	Attendance: 24,417; Referee: William Collum

=== Final ===
17 March 2013
15:00

St Mirren	3 – 2	Heart of Midlothian
Gonçalves 37'; Thompson 46'; Newton 66'	BBC Sport	Stevenson 10', 85'

Hampden Park
Attendance: 44,036
Referee: Craig Thomson
