= 2012–13 Scottish Second Division =

Irn Bru Scottish Second Division
- Season: 2012–13
- Champions: Queen of the South
- Promoted: Queen of the South; Alloa Athletic
- Relegated: Albion Rovers
- Matches: 180
- Goals: 590 (3.28 per match)
- Top goalscorer: Nicky Clark (Queen of the South) (32)
- Biggest home win: Brechin City 7–2 Stenhousemuir (27 October 2012)
- Biggest away win: Brechin City 0–6 Queen of the South (27 March 2013)
- Longest unbeaten run: 18 games Queen of the South

The 2012–13 Scottish Football League Second Division (also known as the 2012–13 Irn Bru Scottish Football League Second Division for sponsorship reasons) was the 19th season in the current format of 10 teams in the third-tier of Scottish football. Cowdenbeath were the current champions.

== Teams ==
Location of teams in Scottish Second Division 2012–13

Two sides were promoted from the 2011–12 competition. Cowdenbeath as champions, and Dumbarton as winners of the promotion play-offs. They were replaced by Queen of the South, who finished bottom of the First Division, and Ayr United, who were relegated through the first division play-offs. Stirling Albion were relegated from this division after finishing bottom, and they were replaced by Third Division winners Alloa Athletic.

Albion Rovers finished in 9th place, but were able to stay up as a result of winning the promotion play-offs. Stranraer, who had lost to Albion Rovers in the play-off final, were promoted to the Second Division after the decision was made for Rangers to start in the Third Division. Stranraer replaced Airdrie United, who will take up the space in the First Division.

=== Stadia and locations ===
Team	Location	Home ground	Capacity
Albion Rovers	Coatbridge	Cliftonhill	2,496
Alloa Athletic	Alloa	Recreation Park	3,412
Arbroath	Arbroath	Gayfield Park	5,900
Ayr United	Ayr	Somerset Park	10,243
Brechin City	Brechin	Glebe Park	3,960
East Fife	Methil	Bayview Stadium	2,000
Forfar Athletic	Forfar	Station Park	6,777
Queen of the South	Dumfries	Palmerston Park	6,412
Stenhousemuir	Stenhousemuir	Ochilview Park	3,776
Stranraer	Stranraer	Stair Park	5,600

== League table ==
Pos	Team	Pld	W	D	L	GF	GA	GD	Pts	Promotion, qualification or relegation
1	Queen of the South (C, P)	36	29	5	2	92	23	+69	92	Promotion to the Championship
2	Alloa Athletic (O, P)	36	20	7	9	62	35	+27	67	Qualification for the First Division play-offs
3	Brechin City	36	19	4	13	72	59	+13	61	Qualification for the First Division play-offs
4	Forfar Athletic	36	17	3	16	67	74	−7	54	Qualification for the First Division play-offs
5	Arbroath	36	15	7	14	47	57	−10	52	
6	Stenhousemuir	36	12	13	11	59	59	0	49	
7	Ayr United	36	12	5	19	53	65	−12	41	
8	Stranraer	36	10	7	19	43	71	−28	37	
9	East Fife (O)	36	8	8	20	50	65	−15	32	Qualification for the Second Division play-offs
10	Albion Rovers (R)	36	7	3	26	45	82	−37	24	Relegation to the League Two

Source: SPFL Archive
Rules for classification: 1) points; 2) goal difference; 3) number of goals scored.
(C) Champions; (O) Play-off winners; (P) Promoted; (R) Relegated

== Results ==
Teams play each other four times in this league. In the first half of the season each team plays every other team twice (home and away) and then do the same in the second half of the season, for a total of 36 games.

=== First half of season ===
Home \ Away	ALB	ALO	ARB	AYR	BRE	EFI	FOR	QOS	STE	STR
Albion Rovers		0–3	4–0	2–0	1–2	0–3	2–3	0–3	4–4	2–1
Alloa Athletic	5–1		2–3	1–0	2–2	1–1	2–1	1–0	0–2	3–0
Arbroath	2–1	1–2		4–2	3–1	2–0	1–1	2–3	2–2	2–1
Ayr United	2–1	0–0	2–0		3–0	2–3	2–3	2–4	1–1	2–1
Brechin City	1–0	1–3	3–2	2–1		2–1	4–1	0–3	7–2	3–0
East Fife	1–2	0–1	2–1	2–3	2–2		3–0	0–0	3–2	0–1
Forfar Athletic	4–2	2–3	1–1	2–1	1–0	3–2		1–5	3–2	4–0
Queen of the South	1–0	1–0	6–0	2–0	1–0	1–0	2–0		2–2	4–1
Stenhousemuir	1–0	0–2	2–2	1–1	3–1	3–0	0–4	1–3		0–0
Stranraer	1–1	3–2	1–1	2–0	0–2	2–6	4–1	0–2	1–1	

Source: BBC Sport
Legend: Blue = home team win; Yellow = draw; Red = away team win.

=== Second half of season ===
Home \ Away	ALB	ALO	ARB	AYR	BRE	EFI	FOR	QOS	STE	STR
Albion Rovers		1–5	0–1	1–3	3–1	1–1	1–2	0–1	4–3	2–3
Alloa Athletic	4–1		0–1	2–2	0–1	1–1	1–0	1–2	1–0	4–1
Arbroath	2–1	0–1		1–4	0–1	1–0	3–1	1–1	0–0	1–0
Ayr United	5–2	0–2	0–1		1–2	2–1	2–1	1–5	1–2	2–1
Brechin City	2–0	3–2	2–0	2–1		6–0	3–4	0–6	1–2	2–2
East Fife	2–0	2–1	0–1	3–3	0–3		1–2	2–3	1–2	1–1
Forfar Athletic	4–2	0–1	2–4	2–1	1–4	3–2		0–4	3–3	3–1
Queen of the South	3–0	0–0	5–1	2–0	2–1	2–2	3–1		2–1	2–0
Stenhousemuir	0–1	1–1	1–0	4–0	3–3	2–1	2–0	2–1		1–2
Stranraer	3–2	1–2	2–0	0–1	3–2	3–1	0–3	0–5	1–1	

Source: BBC Sport
Legend: Blue = home team win; Yellow = draw; Red = away team win.

== Second Division play-offs ==
Times are BST (UTC+1)

=== Semi-finals ===
The fourth placed team in the Third Division (Berwick Rangers) played the ninth placed team in the Second Division (East Fife) and third placed team in the Third Division (Peterhead) played the second placed team in the Third Division (Queen's Park). The play-offs were played over two legs, and the winning team in each semi-final advanced to the final.

Team 1	Agg.	Team 2	1st leg	2nd leg
Berwick Rangers	2–3	East Fife	1–1	1–2
Queen's Park	1–4	Peterhead	0–1	1–3

First legs

8 May
8:00 pm

Berwick Rangers	1 – 1	East Fife
Lavery 72'	BBC Sport	Muir 44'

Shielfield Park
Attendance: 732
Referee: Salmond

8 May
7:30 pm

Queen's Park	0 – 1	Peterhead
	BBC Sport	Rodgers 90' (pen.)

Hampden Park
Attendance: 651
Referee: McKendrick

Second legs

11 May
3:00 pm

East Fife	2 – 1 (a.e.t.)	Berwick Rangers
McDonald 78' (o.g.); Gormley 119'	BBC Sport	Lavery 61' (pen.)

Bayview Stadium
Attendance: 856
Referee: Colvin

11 May
3:00 pm

Peterhead	3 – 1	Queen's Park
Cox 4', 10'; McAllister 64'; Strachan (red card) 80'	BBC Sport	Shankland 87'

Balmoor Stadium
Attendance: 954
Referee: Robertson

=== Final ===
The two semi-final winners played each other over two legs. The winning team was awarded a place in the 2013–14 Second Division.

Team 1	Agg.	Team 2	1st leg	2nd leg
East Fife	1 – 0	Peterhead	0 – 0	1 – 0

First leg

15 May 2013
7:45 pm

East Fife	0 – 0	Peterhead
	BBC Sport

Bayview Stadium
Attendance: 826
Referee: Beaton

Second leg

19 May 2013
3:00 pm

Peterhead	0 - 1	East Fife
	BBC Sport	Muir 48'

Balmoor Stadium
Attendance: 1,855
Referee: Clancy
