= David Cox (footballer) =

Scottish footballer (born 1989)

Personal information
- Date of birth: 17 March 1989 (age 37)
- Place of birth: Lanark, Scotland
- Position: Forward

Youth career
- Livingston
- 2005–2009: Kilmarnock

Senior career*
Years	Team	Apps	(Gls)
2007–2009	Kilmarnock	4	(0)
2009	Montrose	11	(2)
2009–2012	Annan Athletic	93	(14)
2012–2013	Alloa Athletic	2	(0)
2012–2013	→ Peterhead (loan)	10	(3)
2013–2015	Peterhead	63	(3)
2015–2016	Airdrieonians	28	(4)
2016–2018	Forfar Athletic	50	(15)
2018–2021	Cowdenbeath	76	(17)
2021	Albion Rovers	5	(0)
2021–2022	Brechin City	1	(2)
2022–2024	Gretna 2008		
- * Club domestic league appearances and goals

David Cox (born 17 March 1989) is a Scottish retired footballer who played as a forward.

Cox has previously played for Kilmarnock, Montrose, Annan Athletic, Alloa Athletic, Peterhead, Airdrieonians, Forfar Athletic, Cowdenbeath, Albion Rovers, Brechin City and Gretna 2008.

== Career ==
Born in Lanark, Cox began his career in the youth academy of Livingston. He later moved to Kilmarnock where he made his first team debut, aged 19 on 10 May 2008, in their 2–0 victory over Hearts in the Scottish Premier League.

He left Kilmarnock in January 2009, On 18 June 2009, Cox signed a two-year contract with Annan Athletic. On 10 May 2012, he signed for newly promoted Alloa Athletic. In November 2012, Cox signed for Peterhead on loan, making his debut against Rangers on 10 November 2012. On 12 January 2013, the loan was turned into a permanent transfer.

After two and a half years with Peterhead, Cox moved to Scottish League One rivals Airdrieonians in June 2015, departing from the club in April 2016 to sign for Forfar Athletic. In January 2018, Cox was once again signed by manager Gary Bollan, this time for Scottish League Two strugglers Cowdenbeath. He played in both legs of the end-of-season play-off in which Cowdenbeath defeated Cove Rangers 3–2 to maintain their place in the SPFL.

In February 2018, Cox stated that he had been mocked by both players and fans for discussing his mental health problems. In December 2019, he commented that the abuse had continued and in some cases had worsened, and that it had caused him to be overly aggressive on the pitch and as a consequence he was considering quitting football, but that his club had offered their support.

In March 2021, Cox joined Scottish League Two side Albion Rovers. On 29 April 2021, during a match against Stenhousemuir, Cox left the stadium at half-time after an alleged taunt from opposition defender Jonathan Tiffoney, and stated he was retiring from football due to the incident. Tiffoney later refuted the allegations and claimed it was Cox that verbally abused him. A few days later, Cox confirmed that he would not be reversing his decision to retire.

On 1 July 2021, Cox relented on his retirement, and signed for Highland Football League side Brechin City.

== Career statistics ==
As of 23:18, 6 December 2019 (UTC)

Appearances and goals by club, season and competition
Club	Season	League			Scottish Cup		League Cup		Other		Total	
Club	Season	Division	Apps	Goals	Apps	Goals	Apps	Goals	Apps	Goals	Apps	Goals
Kilmarnock	2007–08	Scottish Premier League	2	0	0	0	0	0	0	0	2	0
Kilmarnock	2008–09	Scottish Premier League	2	0	0	0	0	0	0	0	2	0
Kilmarnock	Total		4	0	0	0	0	0	0	0	4	0
Montrose	2008–09	Scottish Third Division	11	2	0	0	0	0	0	0	11	2
Annan Athletic	2009–10	Scottish Third Division	30	5	0	0	1	0	3 (Note: Appearances in the Scottish Challenge Cup)	0	34	5
Annan Athletic	2010–11	Scottish Third Division	32	4	2	0	1	0	0	0	35	4
Annan Athletic	2011–12	Scottish Third Division	31	5	3	0	1	1	4	2	39	8
Annan Athletic	Total		93	14	5	0	3	1	7	2	108	17
Alloa Athletic	2012–13	Scottish Second Division	2	0	0	0	1	0	1	0	4	0
Peterhead (loan)	2012–13	Scottish Third Division	10	3	0	0	0	0	0	0	10	3
Peterhead	2012–13	Scottish Third Division	17	0	0	0	0	0	4 (Note: Appearances in the Second Division play-offs)	2	21	2
Peterhead	2013–14	Scottish League Two	13	1	1	0	1	0	2	2	17	3
Peterhead	2014–15	Scottish League One	33	2	0	0	1	0	3	0	37	2
Peterhead	Total		63	3	1	0	2	0	9	4	75	7
Airdrieonians	2015–16	Scottish League One	28	4	2	0	2	0	1	0	33	4
Forfar Athletic	2016–17	Scottish League Two	33	11	2	0	4	0	5 (Note: One appearance in the Scottish Challenge Cup; four appearances and a goal in the League One play-offs)	1	44	12
Forfar Athletic	2017–18	Scottish League One	17	4	1	0	4	0	1	0	23	4
Forfar Athletic	Total		50	15	3	0	8	0	6	1	68	16
Cowdenbeath	2017–18	Scottish League Two	16	2	0	0	0	0	2 (Note: Appearances in the League Two play-offs)	0	18	2
Cowdenbeath	2018–19	Scottish League Two	34	9	3	3	4	1	1	0	42	13
Cowdenbeath	2019–20	Scottish League Two	11	4	2	1	4	0	1	0	18	5
Cowdenbeath	Total		61	15	5	4	8	1	4	0	78	20
Career total			322	56	16	4	24	2	28	7	390	69
