= Stephen Simmons (footballer) =

Scottish footballer

Personal information
- Date of birth: 27 February 1982 (age 44)
- Place of birth: Glasgow, Scotland
- Position: Midfielder

Team information
- Current team: Dumbarton (Assistant manager)

Youth career
- Celtic Boys Club
- 1998–2001: Heart of Midlothian

Senior career*
Years	Team	Apps	(Gls)
2000–2006	Heart of Midlothian	89	(8)
2001	→ Cowdenbeath (loan)	2	(0)
2006–2008	Dunfermline Athletic	59	(5)
2008	Queen of the South	9	(0)
2008–2011	Raith Rovers	60	(3)
2011–2012	Queen of the South	29	(2)
2012–2016	Alloa Athletic	81	(6)
Total		329	(24)

International career
2002	Scotland U21	1	(0)

Managerial career
- 2021–2024: Brechin City (Assistant)
- 2025–: Dumbarton (Assistant)
- * Club domestic league appearances and goals

Stephen Simmons (born 27 February 1982) is a Scottish retired professional footballer and football coach who is currently the assistant manager of Scottish League Two side Dumbarton.

== Career ==
Simmons started his senior career with Heart of Midlothian in 1998, having previously been attached to Celtic through their Boys Club system. He made his senior debut 2 years later as a substitute in a 3–1 defeat of Dundee United on 23 December 2000 and, after a further two substitute appearances, was loaned to Cowdenbeath in March to further aid his development. In 2001–02 Simmons blossomed into a first team regular. He scored his first senior goal against Rangers in September to earn Hearts a 2–2 draw and netted a further 4 times during a season in which he also earned Scotland U21 recognition. He was unable to maintain this level of form in the following years, however, and with the likes of Paul Hartley, Scott Severin and Phil Stamp preferred in central midfield, for the next 3 seasons he assumed the role of perpetual substitute, 41 of his 64 appearances coming from the bench.

In January 2006, with Hearts, acquiring further competition for his favoured central midfield role allowed Simmons to leave Tynecastle, signing for Dunfermline on an initial 6-month deal. Due to an earlier cup appearance with Hearts, he was ineligible to appear in Dunfermline's League Cup campaign that season, in which they lost 3–0 to Celtic in the final. However, his league performances were enough to ensure he earned a new, extended contract in the summer. He signed this contract on the same day as he was married in May 2006 with then Pars manager Jim Leishman attending the wedding ceremony to complete the deal. In April 2008, Dunfermline manager Jim McIntyre announced that Simmons had been offered a new contract but had decided to leave the Scottish First Division side to "pursue other avenues". In May 2008, Simmons was linked with Scottish First Division side Dundee and in July 2008 it was announced he was on trial with League Two side Morecambe.

Simmons eventually signed a short-term deal with Scottish First Division side Queen of the South in September 2008.

He played as a trialist for Raith Rovers in their Scottish Second Division league game against Peterhead in August 2008 and he made a second trialist appearance for Raith Rovers on Saturday 18 January 2009 at home to Stranraer. On 23 January 2009 he signed. He scored in Raith Rovers' Scottish Cup quarter-final win over Dundee in 2010.

On 17 June 2011 Simmons rejoined Queen of the South. His second spell at QoS debut was on 23 July 2011 the extra time 2–0 defeat away at Ayr United in the 2011-12 Scottish Challenge Cup. For this game he was given the captain's armband. He scored his first ever QoS goal on Saturday 3 December 2011 in the 4–1 home win against Ayr United. Simmons signed for Alloa Athletic on 26 June 2012, where he linked up with his former Hearts teammate Paul Hartley.

=== Coaching career ===
Simmons was the assistant manager at Brechin City when Andy Kirk and Craig Levein were brought to the club but left the club in 2024. He was appointed as assistant manager to Frank McKeown at Scottish League Two side Dumbarton in December 2025.

== Honours ==
Raith Rovers

- Scottish Second Division: 1

2008–09

== See also ==
- 2007–08 Dunfermline Athletic F.C. season
