= Martin Grehan =

Scottish footballer (born 1984)

Personal information
- Date of birth: 9 October 1984 (age 42)
- Place of birth: Glenrothes, Fife, Scotland
- Position: Striker

Youth career
- East Fife
- –2008: Kettle United
- 2008: Dundonald Bluebell

Senior career*
Years	Team	Apps	(Gls)
2008	Motherwell	1	(0)
2008	→ Forfar Athletic (loan)	10	(2)
2008–2010	Stirling Albion	49	(19)
2010–2011	Partick Thistle	39	(3)
2011–2012	Stranraer	27	(5)
2012–2013	Alloa Athletic	31	(8)
2013–2014	Stranraer	36	(13)
2014–2015	Stenhousemuir	26	(6)
2015–2016	Arbroath	13	(1)
2016–2017	Kilbirnie Ladeside		
2017–2020	BSC Glasgow	61	(33)
2020–2021	Gartcairn		
2021	BSC Glasgow		
2021–2022	Drumchapel United		
2023–2024	Broomhill	28	(3)
- * Club domestic league appearances and goals as of 28 May 2021

Martin Grehan (born 9 October 1984) is a Scottish footballer who played as a forward before becoming professional. Prolific as an amateur and winning the 5 a-side Scottish Cup 2003 in Dunfermline and 2004 edition in Hamilton with Inter Silky Soccer.

== Career ==
Grehan was born in Glenrothes. After a spell in the East Fife Youth system, Grehan spent some time in the Amateurs with Fife side Kettle United. During his time at United he played with the Scotland Amateur Team. Grehan then joined Scottish Premier League club Motherwell from junior team Dundonald Bluebell in January 2008. He became the first junior player to join the club since legend Dougie Arnott back in the late 1980s. Soon after, Grehan went on a month's loan to Scottish Third Division club Forfar Athletic, and made an immediate impact by scoring on his debut.

Grehan was released by Motherwell and then signed for Scottish Second Division club Stirling Albion in the summer of 2008.

Grehan was unveiled by manager Ian McCall on 29 January 2010 as a Partick Thistle player having signed for an undisclosed fee. He scored his first Thistle goal to give The Jags a 2–1 victory, away to Ross County, during the second last match of the 2009–10 season.

After his spell at Thistle, Grehan moved to Stranraer. Grehan went on to play 27 games for Stranraer, scoring 5 goals, as the club reached the end of season play-offs, losing in the final against Albion Rovers. Grehan signed for Alloa Athletic in the 2012 summer transfer window. However, after only one season at Alloa, he was released by Paul Hartley in May 2013. Grehan then returned to Stranraer for the 2013–14 season in June 2013. Grehan departed Stranraer after one season and signed for League One rivals Stenhousemuir on 6 June 2014. Grehan had a short spell with Arbroath in 2015, before dropping back into junior football with Kilbirnie Ladeside in February 2016.

Grehan signed with BSC Glasgow in 2017 and spent three seasons with the Lowland League club before announcing his intentions to move on in July 2020.

On 5 October 2020, Grehan signed for West of Scotland League team Gartcairn. He later resigned with BSC Glasgow on 7 January 2021.

Drumchapel United announced the signing of Grehan on 22 May 2021.
