= John Gemmell =

Scottish footballer

Personal information
- Full name: John O'Neill Gemmell
- Date of birth: 6 September 1984 (age 42)
- Place of birth: Glasgow, Scotland
- Position: Forward

Youth career
- Giffnock North

Senior career*
Years	Team	Apps	(Gls)
2001–2003	Queen's Park	45	(11)
2003–2005	Partick Thistle	5	(0)
2003–2004	→ Hamilton Academical (loan)	8	(1)
2004–2007	Dumbarton	47	(7)
2007–2008	Bellshill Athletic		
2008–2009	Albion Rovers	21	(11)
2008–2010	Cowdenbeath	35	(13)
2009–2011	Montrose	22	(4)
2010–2012	Albion Rovers	58	(15)
2012–2014	Stenhousemuir	50	(29)
2014–2016	Albion Rovers	38	(8)
2016	Clyde	10	(2)
2016	Hurlford United	15	(15)
2016	Arthurlie	9	(3)
2017–2019	Cambuslang Rangers	64	(59)
2019–2020	Troon	34	(9)
2021–2022	Cambuslang Rangers	28	(17)
2022–2023	Dumbarton	6	(0)
- * Club domestic league appearances and goals as of 19:31, 15 October 2022 (UTC)

John Gemmell (born 6 September 1984) is a Scottish former footballer who last played as a forward for Scottish League Two side Dumbarton and is now Commercial Manager at Albion Rovers.

== Playing career ==
=== Queens Park ===
John began his senior career at Queens Park as a 17-year-old from the Giffnock North youth team. His time at Hampden was fruitful, with a goal record of over 1 in 4.

Gemmell was the top scorer in his last season with the Spiders.

=== Partick Thistle ===
Gemmell was tipped as a future international player when he was signed by manager John Lambie as a 19-year-old, in one of his last acts as Partick Thistle boss. His progress was monitored under his replacement Gerry Collins.

Gemmell was top scorer in Thistle reserves & made some appearances from the bench as Thistle struggled at the wrong end of the Scottish Premier League and he failed to score in 5 appearances in a poor side.

=== Hamilton Academicals ===
Desperate for first-team football, Gemmell joined First Division Accies on a short-term loan deal & saw more action in a side short of goals and falling short of promotion.

=== Dumbarton ===
Manager Paul Martin, a former Queens Park teammate, signed Gemmell for Dumbarton in January 2005 after he was allowed to leave Firhill. He signed an 18-month contract at The Rock.

=== Bellshill Athletic ===
Gemmell had his first taste of Junior football with Bellshill Athletic. He then returned to senior football: electing for a stint at Cliftonhill.

=== Albion Rovers ===
Gemmell's goalscoring exploits at Bellshill attracted attention higher up the leagues, and Albion Rovers boss John McCormack paid a four-figure sum in January 2008 to bring Gemmell to Cliftonhill, where he penned an 18-month deal.

Unsettled at the Manager's departure that summer and keen to prove himself at a higher level, Gemmell was transferred listed at his request at the end of the season.

=== Cowdenbeath ===
Manager Danny Lennon signed Gemmell for Cowdenbeath in the summer of 2008 on a two-year contract, and his haul of 13 goals in 35 games made him a key player for Lennon as he guided the Blue Brazil to successive promotions.

=== Montrose ===
Montrose manager Steven Tweed pursued Gemmell in 2009 before Gemmell finally committed himself to the club on a two-year deal.

Gemmell returned to Albion Rovers for a second spell in August 2010.

=== Stenhousemuir ===
Gemmell signed for Stenhousemuir in the summer of 2012 and he found a home in senior football at last. His strike rate of 29 goals in 50 appearances was his most prolific. He spoke warmly of being appreciated by supporters he had previously been heckled by in opposition teams. His contract was not renewed by incoming Manager Scott Booth and he departed at the end of the season.

=== Clyde ===
After his third spell (18 months this time) at Albion Rovers, Gemmell was signed for Clyde by Manager Barry Ferguson on 1 February 2016 as he was seeking a more physical foil for striker David Gormley. Initially signed on a short-term contract until the end of the season, with a view to a longer stay, Gemmell left unhappy that summer, stating that a verbal contract offer had been reneged upon, with a lesser offer on the table. On point of principle, Gemmell departed Broadwood as a free agent.

=== Hurlford United ===
Gemmell joined Scottish former Junior Cup winners Hurlford United in the summer of 2016. to play under former Stranraer player Darren Henderson.

=== Cambuslang Rangers ===
After a very brief spell with Arthurlie, Gemmell joined Cambuslang Rangers. on 8 March 2017.

With a First Division winners medal & a Super First and a goal-scoring ratio of 57 goals in 64 games, Gemmell departed Somervell Park by mutual consent in January 2019.

=== Troon ===
Gemmell signed for Troon on 21 January 2019, alongside his former Cambuslang Rangers team-mate David Green. Gemmell played as a central defender for the remainder of the season to help the Portland Parkers through an injury crisis before returning to lead the line as the club's main striker for season 2019/20.

=== Cambuslang Rangers ===
Gemmell returned to Cambuslang Rangers in 2021 and was named club captain shortly after. With injuries in defense, Gemmell had to fill in as a central defender for some games and also net 17 times as he surpassed the 100-goal mark at that level of football.

=== Dumbarton (second spell) ===
Gemmell returned to senior football in August 2022 at the age of 37, joining Scottish League Two side Dumbarton for a second spell with the club, having impressed as a trialist. His season ended in October, however, after a serious injury, with Gemmell retiring due to it in May 2023.

== Life after Football ==
John became Commercial director of ex-Club Albion Rovers after retiring from playing football he started the role in June 2026.
