= Brown Ferguson =

Scottish footballer and manager

Personal information
- Full name: Brown Ferguson
- Date of birth: 4 June 1981 (age 45)
- Place of birth: Falkirk, Scotland
- Height: 5 ft 11 in (1.80 m)
- Position: Defensive midfielder

Team information
- Current team: Ayr United (Assistant manager)

Senior career*
Years	Team	Apps	(Gls)
1998–2002	East Stirlingshire	85	(3)
2002–2005	Alloa Athletic	64	(12)
2005–2006	Hamilton Academical	28	(7)
2006–2007	Partick Thistle	24	(1)
2007–2011	Alloa Athletic	98	(15)
2011–2014	Stenhousemuir	64	(9)
Total		365	(47)

Managerial career
- 2015–2018: Stenhousemuir
- 2019–2021: Linlithgow Rose
- 2023–2026: Stenhousemuir (Assistant Manager)
- 2026–: Ayr United (Assistant Manager)
- * Club domestic league appearances and goals

Brown Ferguson (born 4 June 1981 in Falkirk) is a Scottish football player and coach. He is currently the assistant manager of Ayr United . He also previously had manager spells at Stenhousemuir and Linlithgow Rose.

As a player, he played for East Stirlingshire, Alloa Athletic, Hamilton Academical, Partick Thistle and then finally at Stenhousemuir.

His coaching career began with Stenhousemuir, and he managed the club for over three years previously.

== Playing career ==
Ferguson started his career with East Stirlingshire in 1998. In the summer of 2002, Ferguson moved to Alloa Athletic (two spells), where he made a great start to his Alloa career only to break his leg and face a long time on the sidelines. The club stuck by Ferguson during his injury and he repaid them once fully fit with some commanding displays from centre midfield endearing himself to the fans.

At the end of the 2004–05 season, Brown moved up to the Scottish Football League First Division to Hamilton Academical where he spent one season before moving to Partick Thistle for the 2006–2007 season.

Ferguson joined Alloa Athletic in June 2007 and moved to Stenhousemuir in 2011. In January 2014, after parting ways with Martyn Corrigan, Stenhousemuir appointed Brown as caretaker manager until Scott Booth took charge.

== Coaching career ==
On 30 June 2014, Ferguson decided to retire from playing professional football. He was appointed caretaker manager of Stenhousemuir after Scott Booth was sacked in February 2015. Later in 2015, Ferguson was appointed manager on a permanent basis. He led the club to Scottish League One safety after beating Queen's Park after winning a two-legged final in May 2015.

Ferguson signed a new contract with Stenhousemuir in September 2016. Stenhousemuir were relegated to Scottish League Two in May 2017. Ferguson led the club to immediate promotion back to Scottish League One after a play-off win against Peterhead the following season. He was sacked by Stenhousemuir in November 2018, with the team sitting in ninth place in League One.

After a spell working for the Rangers academy, Ferguson was appointed manager of Linlithgow Rose in October 2019.

== Career statistics ==
=== Manager ===
As of 3 November 2018

Team	From	To	Record				
Team	From	To	G	W	D	L	Win %
Stenhousemuir	February 2015	November 2018	165	51	30	84	30.91

== Honours and achievements ==
=== Manager ===
Stenhousemuir

- Scottish League One play-offs: 2014–15; 2017–18
- Stirlingshire Cup: 2014-15

=== Individual ===
- Stenhousemuir
  - SPFL League One Manager of the Month (1): November 2015
