= Greg Aitken =

Scottish football referee (born 1977)

Greg Aitken (born 1977) is a Scottish football referee and one of the first dedicated video assistant referees (VARs) in Scotland.

== Early life and career ==
Greg Aitken began his refereeing career in the early 2000s, officiating matches in the lower divisions of Scottish football.

In August 2023, the Scottish Football Association (SFA) appointed Greg Aitken and Andrew Dallas as the first dedicated video assistant referees in Scotland. It has an Independent Review Panel to assess match incidents. The VAR team operates from Clydesdale House, the SFA's VAR operations center.
