= Don Robertson (referee) =

Scottish football referee

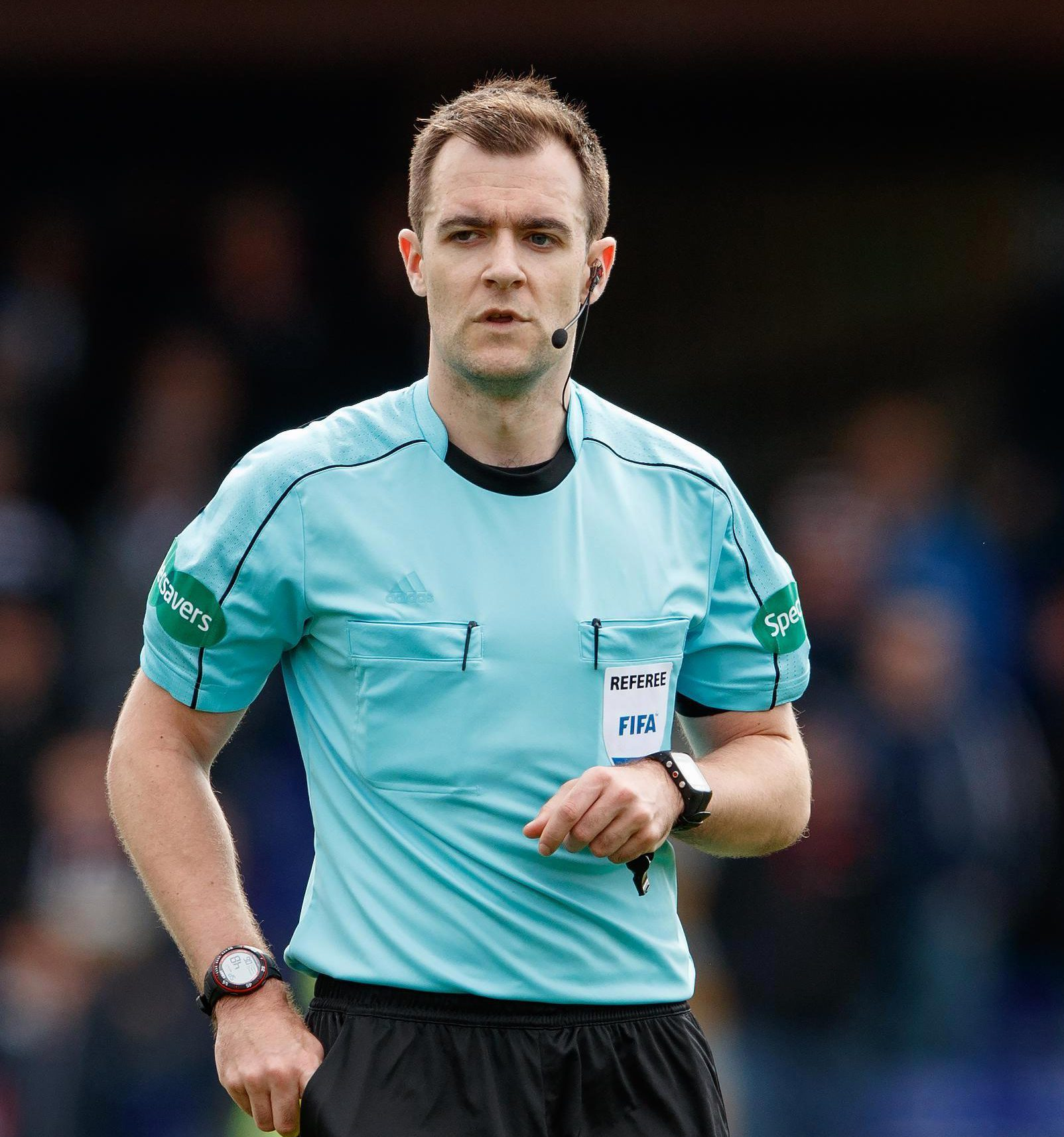
- Robertson in 2017
- Full name: Donald Robertson
- Born: 1 January 1987 (age 39); Glasgow, Scotland

Domestic
Years	League	Role
2014–	SPFL	Referee

International
Years	League	Role
2017–	FIFA listed	Referee

Donald Robertson (born 1 January 1987) is a Scottish football referee. He began refereeing in 2011, and has been a FIFA referee since 2017. Before his refereeing career, Robertson was a youth goalkeeper with Partick Thistle (where his brother Michael also had a short spell), Queen's Park and St. Mirren.

== Career ==
Robertson first began refereeing in 2011. Since then (as of June 2020), he has made 268 refereeing appearances, given 791 yellow cards and 51 red cards.

Celtic manager Brendan Rodgers openly criticised Robertson after a match in 2017 when Robertson awarded a penalty against Celtic, stating that "if he makes too many of them (mistakes) he is not going to be a top class referee".

Robertson was chosen to referee the first Qualifying round of the UEFA Champions League in 2019. The game took place on 9 July 2019 in Tallinn, Estonia between local side Nõmme Kalju FC and KF Shkëndija of North Macedonia; Shkëndija won 0–1.

In May 2022, Robertson was criticised by Hearts manager Robbie Neilson for not giving a free kick to Hearts when Celtic scored their equalising goal. Celtic went on to win the game and Robertson was criticised for giving Celtic many decisions which swayed the result of the match. Hearts manager Neilson stated "It is a free kick. I have seen it again and am pretty sure you will agree. That was the disappointment with the ref. I thought it was a pretty simple one to get and he doesn’t get it right."

In May 2023 Robertson took charge of his first Celtic vs Rangers match. Robertson replaced injured referee Willie Column just before kick off for the Scottish Cup semi final match between Celtic and Rangers. Robertson later stated that his wife and father in law were at the match.

In June 2023 Robertson refereed the Euro 2024 qualification match between Iceland and Slovakia.

In July 2023, Robertson refereed the Uefa Champions League Match between Hamrun Spar and Maccabi Haifa. The same month Robertson also refereed the Europa Conference League match between Apoel Nicosia and Vojvodina.

In August and September 2023, Robertson refereed the Europa Conference League matches between Astana and Partizan, and Zrinjski Mostar and AZ Alkmaar.

In a match between Rangers and Celtic in 2023, Robertson disallowed a goal scored by Rangers striker Kemar Roofe for an apparent infringement in the lead up to the goal, Celtic went on to win the match. The decision was criticised after the match.

In a match between Rangers and Aberdeen in 2024 Robertson sent off Rangers player Dujon Sterling late in the game despite the fact that Robertson was asked to review his decision by VAR. The decision was criticised after the game due to Robertsons lack of consistency. A subsequent independent VAR review of decisions taken during the 2023-24 season decided that Robertson's decision to send off Sterling was incorrect, and the correct decision should have been a yellow card.

In a match between Hearts and Celtic in March 2023 Robertson awarded both Hearts and Celtic penalties in the game. A subsequent independent VAR review of decisions taken during the 2023-24 season decided that both penalties were incorrectly awarded.

In the 2024 Scottish Cup Semi Final between Celtic and Aberdeen, Robertson changed his decision to award Aberdeen a late penalty kick but instead awarded Celtic a free kick. The decision, which effectively meant Celtic won the game, was criticised after the match.

Kilmarnock manager Derek McInnes revealed that Robertson apologised to him at half time in a match against Celtic for not stopping the game for a foul in the lead up to Celtics opening goal.

In the final league match of the 2023-24 season, Robertson decided not to award Rangers a penalty against Hearts. The decision was criticised after the game with former referee Dermot Gallagher stating "I thought it was a foul and I was surprised this wasn’t referred [for a pitchside review]".

Robertson was the official involved with calling off the Dundee vs Rangers match in April 2024. The match was called off twice by Robertson within hours of the scheduled kick off time due to a waterlogged pitch. The original date for the match was meant to be March 17th, but this was rearranged twice following that original call off.

Robertson was the VAR official during the match between Aberdeen and Rangers in October 2024. During the match VAR awarded Aberdeen a penalty for an apparent handball by Rangers defender John Souttar. Aberdeen went on to win the match by 2 goals to 1.

Following a review into refereeing decisions made in November 2024, it was found that Don Robertson was wrong in his position as VAR official not to ask the referee Nick Walsh to send off Celtic player Hatate during a match against Kilmarnock for a dangerous challenge.

In a December 2024 match between Aberdeen and Celtic, Robertson turned down two penalty appeals for Aberdeen. Robertson also failed to punish Celtic striker Kyogo for a challenge on Aberdeen goalkeeper Ross Doohan. The Celtic player kicked Doohan in the head while chasing a through ball and the challenge has since been described as "reckless and shows a disregard for the opponent".

Robertson was criticised following his refereeing performance in a match between Rangers and Celtic in January 2025. During the match Rangers player Raskin grappled with Celtic's McGregor just before half time and Robertson cautioned Rangers player Raskin but didn't caution the Celtic player. Raskin later reflected on this after the game saying I think the referee wanted to book us both, but then looked at him and remembered he had a yellow and then just booked me. So it was a bit unfair for me, because if you book me, you have to book him. We've both done the same thing. So it's just a bit weird.

On 16 May 2026, Robertson officiated a crucial match in the title race between Celtic and Hearts at Celtic Park. There was high controversy about the game over Celtics second goal scored by Daizen Maeda which was argued to be offside, however after a thorough check by Robertson and VAR the goal was deemed to be onside. Further controversy regarded a pitch invasion from Celtic fans after The Hoop’s third goal before the game had ended, but Robertson remained professional and decided the best course of action was to blow the final whistle to officially end the game along with Robertson and other officials giving a fair performance without any major mistakes. Celtic secured a 3-1 victory to finally clinch the Scottish Premiership title for the 2025-2026 season.
