= Andy Rodgers =

Scottish footballer (born 1983)

Personal information
- Full name: Andrew Rodgers
- Date of birth: 18 October 1983 (age 43)
- Place of birth: Falkirk, Scotland
- Height: 5 ft 11 in (1.80 m)
- Position: Forward

Youth career
- Falkirk

Senior career*
Years	Team	Apps	(Gls)
2000–2004	Falkirk	33	(2)
2003–2004	→ Dumbarton (loan)	11	(4)
2004–2006	Dumbarton	64	(18)
2006–2008	Montrose	55	(14)
2008–2010	East Stirlingshire	75	(24)
2010–2011	Ayr United	31	(4)
2011–2013	Stenhousemuir	49	(17)
2013	→ Peterhead (loan)	14	(6)
2013–2016	Peterhead	62	(18)
2016	→ East Stirlingshire (loan)	4	(2)
2016–2021	East Stirlingshire	102	(68)
2021	Kelty Hearts	1	(0)
2021–2022	Syngenta		

Managerial career
- 2018–2021: East Stirlingshire (assistant)
- * Club domestic league appearances and goals

Andrew Rodgers (born 18 October 1983) is a Scottish football coach and a former forward.

== Career ==
Rodgers began his career at Falkirk, scoring nine minutes into his debut after coming on as a substitute in a 2–1 win against Ross County in the First Division on 24 November 2001. During his time at Falkirk he spent a week on trial at English club Tottenham Hotspur in 2001.

On 20 December 2003, he left Falkirk to join Dumbarton, initially on loan, before signing permanently on 18 June 2004.

After two seasons at Dumbarton, on 22 July 2006, Rodgers moved to Montrose. He then signed for East Stirlingshire on 1 February 2008.

On 11 July 2010, Rodgers signed for Second Division club Ayr United.

Rodgers was released by Ayr in 2011 and signed for Stenhousemuir. He was awarded the SFL Goal of the Month for September 2011 for his overhead kick against East Fife, he had also scored a similar effort for Ayr United in a Scottish Cup tie against Junior club Sunnybank the previous season.

On 25 January 2013, Rodgers signed for Peterhead on loan until the end of the 2012–13 season. On 21 June 2013, he agreed a deal to sign permanently for Peterhead. On 12 April 2014, Rodgers opened the scoring in Peterhead's 2–0 win against Clyde, a result which meant the club won the Scottish League Two title and promotion to League One.

In July 2016, Rodgers returned to East Stirlingshire on a month-long loan deal. On 8 September 2016, Rodgers signed a full contract with East Stirlingshire until the end of the season. Rodgers scored 41 goals in his first season back at East Stirlingshire before following this up with 18 goals in the 2017–18 campaign, then 6 goals in 2018–19 and 3 goals in 2019–20. Rodgers was appointed player/assistant manager of The Shire in September 2018, alongside teammate and Shire legend Derek Ure; who took over managerial duties as player/manager.

Rodgers left East Stirlingshire on 4 January 2021, and later signed with Shire's Lowland League rivals Kelty Hearts on 6 January 2021.

Syngenta announced the signing of Rodgers on 4 June 2021.

== Honours ==
Falkirk

- Scottish First Division: 2002–03

Peterhead

- Scottish League Two: 2013–14
