= Shielfield Park =

Football stadium in England

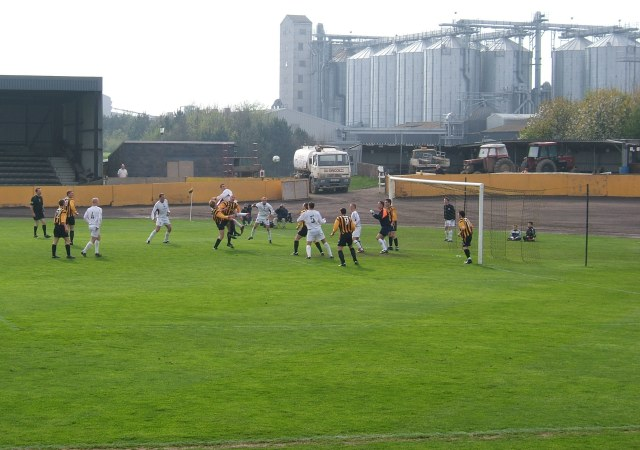
- Berwick Rangers playing Stenhousemuir at Shielfield Park in 2006.

- Location in Northumberland
- Location: Berwick-upon-Tweed, England
- Coordinates: 55°45′36″N 2°00′57″W
- Owner: Berwick Rangers Supporters Trust
- Capacity: 4,099 (1,366 seated)
- Surface: Grass
- Field size: 100 x 70 yards (football pitch)

Construction
- Opened: 1954

Tenants
- Berwick Rangers F.C. (1954–present); Berwick Bandits (1968–1980, 1996–present)

Shielfield Park is a football stadium that is home to Berwick Rangers and Berwick Bandits speedway team. Although Berwick Rangers is a Scottish Lowland Football League club, Shielfield Park is situated in the English county of Northumberland.

== History ==
There has been a ground at Shielfield Park, named after land owned by local butcher William Shiel Dods, since 1890. Berwick Rangers played at a number of other sites in Berwick, including a ground adjacent to the present site at Shielfield. Berwick Rangers first entered the Scottish Football League in 1951. After a successful run in the 1953–54 Scottish Cup, a stand was purchased from Bradford City and the team settled at Shielfield. The ground was opened with a game against Aston Villa. The record attendance at Shielfield Park is 13,365, for the Scottish Cup game against Rangers on 28 January 1967, which Berwick won 1–0 in a famous cup upset.

Due to financial problems, Berwick Rangers was forced to sell Shielfield Park to the local council in 1985, who leased it back to the club. Both stand roofs were dismantled in 1990 as a safety precaution. Berwick Rangers nearly went out of business in 1992 and the lease was sold to a greyhound company. The greyhound company initially locked Berwick Rangers out, forcing the club to groundshare with other Second Division clubs. The company eventually relented and allowed the club back in for part of each week. The club's supporters eventually bought the lease out in August 1995. The Club are now the leaseholders after the supporters club and supporters Trust handed over the shares they held to the club in 2023

== Speedway ==
Berwick Bandits first used Shielfield Park in 1968, but the speedway team left in 1981. Arguments with Berwick Rangers forced the Bandits to find a new home, which was Berrington Lough near Ancroft, Northumberland. The club moved back into Berwick in 1996 and have remained there ever since, enjoying much success during this time and good crowd attendances.

== Greyhound racing ==
Gordon Grant secured a lease for greyhound racing in 1991 and after the construction of a track and associated facilities the racing arrived at Shielfield Park on 29 May 1992. The 390m circumference track was described as a good galloping circuit but the venture only lasted four years because the football club fans bought out the lease in 1995.

== Structure and facilities ==
The current capacity of Shielfield Park is 4,099, of which 1,366 are seated in the Main Stand. Opposite the Main Stand is a small covered terrace, nicknamed the "Ducket". Both of the ends are turfed and unused as spectator areas. Behind the west end curve is a maltings.
