= Balmoor Stadium =

Football stadium in Peterhead, Scotland

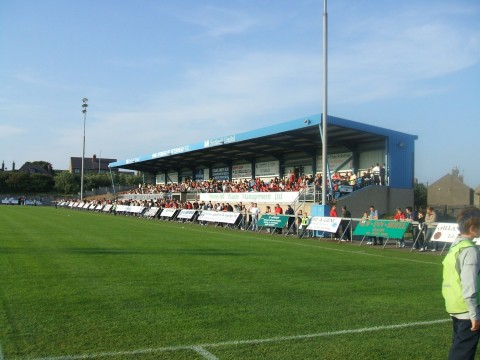
- View of the East Stand at Balmoor

- Location within Aberdeenshire
- Location: Peterhead, Scotland
- Coordinates: 57°30′42″N 1°47′45″W
- Owner: Peterhead F.C.
- Capacity: 3,150 (1,000 seated)
- Surface: Grass
- Record attendance: 4,855 (vs Rangers, 20 January 2013)
- Field size: 105 × 70 yards

Construction
- Opened: 1997

Tenant
- Peterhead F.C.

Balmoor (also known as Balmoor Stadium) is an association football ground in the Scottish town of Peterhead, Aberdeenshire. It is home to Peterhead. The stadium has a capacity of 3,150 spectators, of which 1,000 can be seated.

The ground was opened in 1997, after Peterhead's old Recreation Park ground was sold off to supermarket company Safeway. The standard of the facilities at Balmoor was one of the main reasons why Peterhead were elected to the Scottish Football League in 2000, along with Elgin City.

The record attendance at Balmoor is 4,855, for a Scottish Football League Third Division match against Rangers on 20 January 2013. This broke the previous record crowd of 4,505.

The nearest railway station to Balmoor is Aberdeen railway station, which is 32 miles (51 km) away. This is the greatest distance between a senior league football ground and its nearest railway station in Great Britain. Balmoor is located on the A982 road, just north of Peterhead town centre.
