= John McKendrick =

Scottish football referee

- Full name: John McKendrick
- Born: 11 May 1969 (age 57); Scotland

Domestic
Years	League	Role
1986-	SFA	Referee
2013-	SPFL	Referee

John McKendrick (born 11 May 1969) is a Scottish football referee.

McKendrick is a senior lecturer in human geography at Glasgow Caledonian University.
