= 2013–14 Falkirk F.C. season =

Falkirk
2013–14 season
- Chairman: Martin Ritchie
- Manager: Gary Holt
- Stadium: Falkirk Stadium
- Championship: Third place
- Premiership play-off: Semi-final
- Challenge Cup: Quarter-final
- League Cup: Third round
- Scottish Cup: Fourth round
- Top goalscorer: League: Rory Loy (20); All: Rory Loy (22)
- Highest home attendance: 6,228 vs. Rangers, Scottish Cup, 30 November 2013
- Lowest home attendance: 1,154 vs. Clyde, League Cup, 3 August 2013
- Average home league attendance: 3,124
Home colours	Away colours

The 2013–14 season was Falkirk's first season in the newly formed Scottish Championship and their fourth consecutive season in the second tier of Scottish football, having been relegated from the Scottish Premier League at the end of season 2009–10. Falkirk also competed in the Challenge Cup, League Cup and the Scottish Cup.

== Summary ==
=== Season ===
Falkirk finished third in the Scottish Championship with 66 points and qualified for the Scottish Premiership play-offs, losing to Hamilton Academical in the semi-final. Falkirk also reached the quarter-final of the Challenge Cup, the third round of the League Cup and the fourth round of the Scottish Cup.

== Results & fixtures ==
Win Draw Loss Postponed

=== Scottish Championship ===
10 August 2013 1	Dumbarton	1–1	Falkirk	Dumbarton Football Stadium, Dumbarton
15:00	Prunty 84'	Report	McGrandles 61'	Attendance: 1,224; Referee: Calum Murray

17 August 2013 2	Falkirk	3–1	Greenock Morton	Falkirk Stadium, Falkirk
15:00	Loy 40', 45'; Roberts 48'	Report	Hands 90'	Attendance: 3,058; Referee: Craig Thomson

24 August 2013 3	Livingston	0–3	Falkirk	Almondvale Stadium, Livingston
15:00		Report	Roberts 30', 41', 54'	Attendance: 1,416; Referee: George Salmond

31 August 2013 4	Falkirk	1–2	Hamilton Academical	Falkirk Stadium, Falkirk
15:00	Fulton 50'	Report	Antoine-Curier 72'; Crawford 75'	Attendance: 3,266; Referee: Bobby Madden

14 September 2013 5	Cowdenbeath	1–0	Falkirk	Central Park, Cowdenbeath
15:00	Stewart 89'	Report		Attendance: 644

21 September 2013 6	Falkirk	3–1	Dundee	Falkirk Stadium, Falkirk
15:00	Loy 12', 65'; Fulton 55'	Report	Conroy 74'	Attendance: 3,349; Referee: Willie Collum

28 September 2013 7	Raith Rovers	1–1	Falkirk	Stark's Park, Kirkcaldy
15:00	Anderson 3'	Report	Faulds 90+1'	Attendance: 1,715; Referee: John McKendrick

5 October 2013 8	Falkirk	2–1	Queen of the South	Falkirk Stadium, Falkirk
15:00	Loy 33' (pen.), 85'	Report	Russell 57'	Attendance: 3,189; Referee: John Beaton

12 October 2013 9	Alloa Athletic	0–0	Falkirk	Recreation Park, Alloa
15:00		Report		Attendance: 1,625; Referee: Willie Collum

19 October 2013 10	Falkirk	1–2	Dumbarton	Falkirk Stadium, Falkirk
15:00	Roberts 39' (red card) 90+3'	Report	Fleming 7'; Megginson 24'	Attendance: 2,704; Referee: George Salmond

26 October 2013 11	Hamilton Academical	2–0	Falkirk	New Douglas Park, Hamilton
15:00	Andreu 21'; Longridge 89'	Report		Attendance: 1,340; Referee: Alan Muir

9 November 2013 12	Falkirk	4–1	Livingston	Falkirk Stadium, Falkirk
15:00	Vaulks 37'; Loy 52', 69'; Sibbald 60'	Report	Vaulks 72' (o.g.)	Attendance: 2,878; Referee: Euan Anderson

16 November 2013 13	Dundee	1–1	Falkirk	Dens Park, Dundee
15:00	Conroy 24' (pen.)	Report	Leahy 90+3'	Attendance: 4,661; Referee: Stevie O’Reilly

23 November 2013 14	Falkirk	4–0	Cowdenbeath	Falkirk Stadium, Falkirk
15:00	Millar 51', 84'; Loy 75'; Shepherd 87'	Report		Attendance: 2,550; Referee: Barry Cook

7 December 2013 15	Falkirk	3–1	Raith Rovers	Falkirk Stadium, Falkirk
15:00	Sibbald 4'; McGrandles 25'; Kingsley 51'	Report	Spence 73'	Attendance: 2,934; Referee: Alan Muir

21 December 2013 16	Greenock Morton	0–2	Falkirk	Cappielow, Greenock
15:00		Report	Duffie 51'; Loy 69' (pen.)	Attendance: 1,873; Referee: Stephen Finnie

28 December 2013 17	Falkirk	0–0	Alloa Athletic	Falkirk Stadium, Falkirk
15:00		Report		Attendance: 3,417; Referee: Andrew Dallas

4 January 2014 18	Livingston	0–1	Falkirk	Almondvale Stadium, Livingston
15:00	Donaldson (red card) 25'	Report	Loy 26' (pen.)	Attendance: 1,585; Referee: Kevin Graham

11 January 2014 19	Falkirk	0–0	Hamilton Academical	Falkirk Stadium, Falkirk
15:00		Report		Attendance: 3,099; Referee: Crawford Allan

18 January 2014 20	Cowdenbeath	0–2	Falkirk	Central Park, Cowdenbeath
15:00		Report	Millar 54'; Loy 56'	Attendance: 566; Referee: Calum Murray

25 January 2014 21	Falkirk	2–0	Dundee	Falkirk Stadium, Falkirk
15:00	McGrandles 16'; Loy 73'	Report	Letheren (red card) 45+1'	Attendance: 4,183; Referee: Bobby Madden

1 February 2014 22	Falkirk	1–1	Greenock Morton	Falkirk Stadium, Falkirk
15:00	Millar 63' (pen.)	Report	Imrie 45+1'	Attendance: 3,120; Referee: John McKendrick

8 February 2014 23	Queen of the South	2–0	Falkirk	Palmerston Park, Dumfries
15:00	Reilly 81', 86'	Report		Attendance: 1,818; Referee: Iain Brines

15 February 2014 24	Dumbarton	2–1	Falkirk	Dumbarton Football Stadium, Dumbarton
15:00	Megginson 63'; Kirkpatrick 73'	Report	Loy 29'	Attendance: 1,003; Referee: Greg Aitken

22 February 2014 25	Falkirk	1–0	Queen of the South	Falkirk Stadium, Falkirk
15:00	Millar 90+1' (pen.)	Report		Attendance: 2,862; Referee: Brian Colvin

1 March 2014 26	Raith Rovers	2–4	Falkirk	Stark's Park, Kirkcaldy
15:00	Baird 23'; Booth 28' (pen.)	Report	Hill 18' (o.g.); McCracken 47'; Loy 71'; Millar 87'	Attendance: 1,729; Referee: Euan Anderson

8 March 2014 27	Falkirk	1–1	Livingston	Falkirk Stadium, Falkirk
15:00	Alston 82'; Roberts (red card) 86'	Report	McNulty 35'	Attendance: 2,924

15 March 2014 28	Hamilton Academical	3–1	Falkirk	New Douglas Park, Hamilton
15:00	Scotland 4'; MacKinnon 74'; Longridge 90'	BBC	Beck 71'	Attendance: 1,706; Referee: Alan Muir

22 March 2014 29	Alloa Athletic	3–0	Falkirk	Recreation Park, Alloa
15:00	Ferns 71'; Cawley 78'; McCord 87'	BBC	Roberts (red card) 63'	Attendance: 1,025; Referee: Alan Muir

25 March 2014 30	Falkirk	2–0	Dumbarton	Falkirk Stadium, Falkirk
19:45	McCracken 25'; Loy 73'	Report	Murray (red card) 89'	Attendance: 2,489; Referee: Stephen Finnie

29 March 2014 31	Dundee	0–1	Falkirk	Dens Park, Dundee
15:00		BBC	Beck 19'	Attendance: 4,919; Referee: John McKendrick

5 April 2014 32	Falkirk	5–0	Cowdenbeath	Falkirk Stadium, Falkirk
19:45	Loy 16', 28', 54'; Alston 40'; Sibbald 48'	Report		Attendance: 2,830; Referee: Don Robertson

12 April 2014 33	Queen of the South	1–2	Falkirk	Palmerston Park, Dumfries
15:00	Reilly 67'	BBC	Alston 59'; Beck 61'; Flynn (red card) 68'	Attendance: 4,919; Referee: John McKendrick

19 April 2014 34	Falkirk	2–1	Raith Rovers	Falkirk Stadium, Falkirk
15:00	Loy 19'; McGrandles 23'	Report	Vaulks 32' (o.g.)	Attendance: 3,200; Referee: Euan Anderson

26 April 2014 35	Greenock Morton	1–1	Falkirk	Cappielow, Greenock
15:00	Vine 60'	BBC	McGrandles 41'	Attendance: 1,921; Referee: Craig Thomson

3 May 2014 36	Falkirk	3–1	Alloa Athletic	Falkirk Stadium, Falkirk
15:00	Beck 23', 90+1'; Sibbald 61'	Report	Cawley 29'	Attendance: 3,998; Referee: Willie Collum

=== Premiership play-off ===
6 May 2014 Quarter-final 1st leg	Queen of the South	2–1	Falkirk	Palmerston Park, Dumfries
19:45	McHugh 56', 90'	Report	Alston 8'	Attendance: 1,996; Referee: John McKendrick

10 May 2014 Quarter-final 2nd leg	Falkirk	3–1 (a.e.t.) (4–3 agg.)	Queen of the South	Falkirk Stadium, Falkirk
15:00	Loy 53'; Sibbald 70'; Alston 118'	Report	McHugh 36'	Attendance: 4,427; Referee: Calum Murray

13 May 2014 Semi–final 1st Leg	Falkirk	1–1	Hamilton Academical	Falkirk Stadium, Falkirk
19:45	Beck 80'	Report	MacKinnon 61'	Attendance: 4,194; Referee: John Beaton

18 May 2014 Semi–final 2nd Leg	Hamilton Academical	1–0 (2–1 agg.)	Falkirk	New Douglas Park, Hamilton
19:45	Andreu 16'	Report		Attendance: 4,678; Referee: Kevin Clancy

=== Scottish Challenge Cup ===
27 July 2013 First Round	Clyde	1–2	Falkirk	Broadwood Stadium, Cumbernauld
15:00	McCluskey 51'	Report	Alston 49'; McGrandles 64'	Attendance: 935; Referee: Ian Brines

20 August 2013 Second Round	Ayr United	1–2 (a.e.t.)	Falkirk	Somerset Park, Ayr
19:45	Malcolm 41'	Report	Loy 62'; Shepherd 111'	Attendance: 921; Referee: Craig Charleston

7 September 2013 Quarter-Final	Raith Rovers	1–0	Falkirk	Stark's Park, Kirkcaldy
15:00	Spence 86'	Report		Attendance: 1,565; Referee: Crawford Allan

=== Scottish League Cup ===
3 August 2013 First Round	Falkirk	3–0	Clyde	Recreation Park, Alloa
15:00	Alston 73'; Roberts 79'; Grant 81'	Report		Attendance: 1,154; Referee: Brian Colvin

27 August 2013 Second Round	Falkirk	2–1	Dunfermline Athletic	Falkirk Stadium, Falkirk
19:45	Morris 20' (o.g.); Fulton 33'	Report	Moore 28'	Attendance: 3,663; Referee: Steven McLean

25 September 2013 Third Round	Falkirk	0–5	Aberdeen	Falkirk Stadium, Falkirk
19:45		Report	Shaughnessy 23'; Smith 36'; Vernon 54', 55', 75' (pen.)	Attendance: 2,838; Referee: Steven McLean

=== Scottish Cup ===
30 November 2013 Fourth Round	Falkirk	0–2	Rangers	Falkirk Stadium, Falkirk
12:15	McCracken (red card) 57'	Report	Law 89'; Templeton 90+4'	Attendance: 6,228; Referee: Brian Colvin

== Player statistics ==
As of 18 May 2014 (UTC)

No.	Pos	Nat	Player	Total		Championship		League Cup		Scottish Cup		Other	
No.	Pos	Nat	Player	Apps	Goals	Apps	Goals	Apps	Goals	Apps	Goals	Apps	Goals
1	GK	(Northern Ireland) NIR	Michael McGovern	43	0	34+0	0	3+0	0	1+0	0	5+0	0
2	DF	(Scotland) SCO	Kieran Duffie	31	1	26+0	1	3+0	0	1+0	0	1+0	0
3	DF	(Scotland) SCO	Stephen Kingsley	44	1	35+0	1	3+0	0	1+0	0	5+0	0
4	MF	(Nigeria) NGR	Olumide Durojaiye	21	0	7+10	0	2+0	0	0+0	0	1+1	0
5	DF	(Northern Ireland) NIR	Johnny Flynn	29	0	14+8	0	0+1	0	1+1	0	4+0	0
6	MF	(Wales) WAL	Will Vaulks	42	1	33+0	1	3+0	0	1+0	0	5+0	0
7	MF	(England) ENG	Mark Beck	19	6	13+2	5	0+0	0	0+0	0	4+0	1
8	MF	(Scotland) SCO	Blair Alston	38	7	23+6	3	2+1	1	0+1	0	5+0	3
9	FW	(Republic of Ireland) IRL	Philip Roberts	31	6	24+2	5	3+0	1	1+0	0	1+0	0
10	MF	(Scotland) SCO	Craig Sibbald	43	5	29+5	4	3+0	0	1+0	0	4+1	1
11	MF	(Scotland) SCO	Conor McGrandles	45	6	36+0	5	2+1	0	1+0	0	5+0	1
12	GK	(Scotland) SCO	Graham Bowman	2	0	2+0	0	0+0	0	0+0	0	0+0	0
15	DF	(Scotland) SCO	Liam Dick	8	0	1+3	0	1+0	0	0+0	0	1+2	0
16	MF	(Scotland) SCO	Thomas Grant	6	1	0+4	0	0+0	0	1+0	1	0+1	0
17	MF	(Scotland) SCO	Kris Faulds	3	1	0+3	1	0+0	0	0+0	0	0+0	0
18	FW	(Scotland) SCO	Lewis Small	5	0	0+5	0	0+0	0	0+0	0	0+0	0
19	DF	(England) ENG	Luke Leahy	23	1	1+18	1	0+2	0	0+0	0	1+1	0
20	MF	(Scotland) SCO	Steven Brisbane	0	0	0+0	0	0+0	0	0+0	0	0+0	0
21	DF	(Scotland) SCO	Liam Rowan	0	0	0+0	0	0+0	0	0+0	0	0+0	0
22	DF	(Scotland) SCO	Kyle Turnbull	7	0	4+1	0	1+0	0	0+0	0	1+0	0
26	GK	(Scotland) SCO	Gregor Amos	0	0	0+0	0	0+0	0	0+0	0	0+0	0
27	MF	(Scotland) SCO	Ryan Blair	0	0	0+0	0	0+0	0	0+0	0	0+0	0
28	MF	(Scotland) SCO	Michael Martin	1	0	0+0	0	0+1	0	0+0	0	0+0	0
29	MF	(Scotland) SCO	Connor Hogg	2	0	0+2	0	0+0	0	0+0	0	0+0	0
30	FW	(Scotland) SCO	Botti Biabi	1	0	0+0	0	0+0	0	0+0	0	0+1	0
31	FW	(Scotland) SCO	Scott Shepherd	19	1	1+13	1	0+0	0	0+1	0	1+3	0
32	MF	(Scotland) SCO	Robbie McNab	0	0	0+0	0	0+0	0	0+0	0	0+0	0
33	FW	(Scotland) SCO	Rory Loy	41	22	34+0	20	3+0	0	1+0	0	3+0	2
34	DF	(Scotland) SCO	David McCracken	29	2	24+1	2	0+0	0	1+0	0	3+0	0
35	MF	(Scotland) SCO	Mark Millar	29	6	24+0	6	0+0	0	1+0	0	4+0	0
36	DF	(Scotland) SCO	Joe Chalmers	11	0	10+1	0	0+0	0	0+0	0	0+0	0
Players who left the club during the 2013–14 season
7	MF	(Scotland) SCO	Jay Fulton	26	3	19+2	2	2+1	1	1+0	0	1+0	0
13	FW	(England) ENG	Rakish Bingham	12	0	2+9	0	0+1	0	0+0	0	0+0	0

== League table ==
Pos	Team	Pld	W	D	L	GF	GA	GD	Pts	Promotion, qualification or relegation
1	Dundee (C, P)	36	21	6	9	54	26	+28	69	Promotion to the Premiership
2	Hamilton Academical (O, P)	36	19	10	7	68	41	+27	67	Qualification for the Premiership play-off semi-final
3	Falkirk	36	19	9	8	59	33	+26	66	Qualification for the Premiership play-off quarter-final
4	Queen of the South	36	16	7	13	53	39	+14	55	Qualification for the Premiership play-off quarter-final
5	Dumbarton	36	15	6	15	65	64	+1	51	

Source: Soccerway
Rules for classification: 1) points; 2) goal difference; 3) number of goals scored.
(C) Champions; (O) Play-off winners; (P) Promoted

=== Division summary ===
Round	1	2	3	4	5	6	7	8	9	10	11	12	13	14	15	16	17	18	19	20	21	22	23	24	25	26	27	28	29	30	31	32	33	34	35	36
Ground	A	H	A	H	A	H	A	H	A	H	A	H	A	H	H	A	H	A	H	A	H	H	A	A	H	A	H	A	A	H	A	H	A	H	A	H
Result	D	W	W	L	L	W	D	W	D	L	L	W	D	W	W	W	D	W	D	W	W	D	L	L	W	W	D	L	L	W	W	W	W	W	D	W
Position	7	2	2	2	4	3	3	3	4	4	4	4	5	4	3	4	4	3	3	3	3	2	2	3	3	3	3	3	3	3	3	3	3	3	3	3

A = Away; H = Home; W = Win; D = Draw; L = Loss

== Transfers ==
=== Players in ===
Player	From	Fee
(Republic of Ireland) Philip Roberts	(England) Arsenal	Free
(Scotland) David McCracken	(Scotland) St. Johnstone	Free
(Scotland) Rory Loy	(England) Carlisle United	Free
(England) Rakish Bingham	(England) Wigan Athletic	Loan
(Scotland) Mark Millar	(Scotland) Dundee United	Loan
(Scotland) Joe Chalmers	(Scotland) Celtic	Loan
(England) Mark Beck	(England) Carlisle United	Loan

=== Players out ===
Player	To	Fee
(Scotland) Stewart Murdoch	(England) Fleetwood Town	Free
(Scotland) Iain Flannigan	(Scotland) Alloa Athletic	Free
(Scotland) Darren Dods	(Scotland) Forfar Athletic	Free
(Scotland) Sean Higgins	(England) Stenhousemuir	Free
(Montserrat) Lyle Taylor	(England) Sheffield United	Undisclosed
(Scotland) Ryan McGeever	(Scotland) Peterhead	Loan
(Scotland) Jay Fulton	(Wales) Swansea City	Undisclosed
