= Lewis Small =

Scottish footballer

Personal information
- Date of birth: 26 January 1995 (age 31)
- Place of birth: Linlithgow, Scotland
- Position: Forward

Team information
- Current team: Camelon

Youth career
- –2012: Falkirk

Senior career*
Years	Team	Apps	(Gls)
2012–2016	Falkirk	16	(1)
2014–2015	→ Stirling Albion (loan)	4	(0)
2015–2016	→ Stenhouseuir (loan)	23	(1)
2016–2017	Linlithgow Rose		
2017–	Camelon		
- * Club domestic league appearances and goals

Lewis Small (born 26 January 1995) is a Scottish footballer who plays for Camelon. Small was a product of the Falkirk academy system, graduating to the first team in 2012–13 Season.

== Club career ==
Small came through the academy system of his local senior club Falkirk, making his first team debut against Cowdenbeath at Central Park as a substitute for Andy Haworth in the 68th minute. His first senior goal followed in November with the winner deep in injury time against Hamilton Academical. Small has struggled with a shoulder injury over the last couple of years.

On 5 December 2014, Small signed on loan for Stilring Albion on loan until January 2015. Small then signed on a short-term loan deal with Scottish League One side Stenhousemuir in October 2015, scoring on his debut in a two all draw with Cowdenbeath.

== Career statistics ==
As of 22 October 2015

Appearances and goals by club, season and competition
Club	Season	League		Cup		League Cup		Other		Total	
Club	Season	Apps	Goals	Apps	Goals	Apps	Goals	Apps	Goals	Apps	Goals
Falkirk	2012–13	11	1	1	0	0	0	0	0	12	1
Falkirk	2013–14	5	0	0	0	0	0	0	0	5	0
Falkirk	2014–15	0	0	0	0	0	0	0	0	0	0
Falkirk	Total	16	1	1	0	0	0	0	0	17	1
Stirling Albion (loan)	2014–15	4	0	0	0	0	0	0	0	4	0
Stenhousemuir (loan)	2015–16	1	1	0	0	0	0	0	0	1	1
Career total		21	2	1	0	0	0	0	0	22	2
