= Steven Brisbane =

Scottish footballer

Personal information
- Date of birth: 13 January 1995 (age 31)
- Place of birth: Scotland
- Position: Midfielder

Senior career*
| Years | Team | Apps | (Gls) |
| 2011–2014 | Falkirk | 2 | (0) |
| 2013–2014 | → Broxburn Athletic (loan) | | |
| 2014–2015 | East Stirlingshire | 26 | (1) |
| 2015–2016 | Clyde | 7 | (0) |
| 2016–2019 | East Stirlingshire | | |
- * Club domestic league appearances and goals

Steven Brisbane (born 13 January 1995) is a Scottish former professional footballer who played as a midfielder. He has previously played for Falkirk, East Stirlingshire and Clyde, as well as Broxburn Athletic on loan.

== Career ==
Brisbane aged 16 made his first team debut on 13 August 2011 as a substitute in Falkirk's 2–1 win over Partick Thistle in the Scottish First Division. On 23 October 2013, Brisbane signed for Junior club Broxburn Athletic on loan. Brisbane was released by Falkirk on 21 February 2014.

On 18 July 2014, Brisbane agreed a deal to sign for East Stirlingshire. On 21 May 2015, Brisbane agreed a one-year deal with Clyde, however, he was released by the Cumbernauld side after just one season in which he made only 14 competitive appearances for the side.

== Career statistics ==
As of 22 February 2014

Club statistics
| Club | Season | League | | Scottish Cup | | League Cup | | Other | | Total | |
| Club | Season | App | Goals | App | Goals | App | Goals | App | Goals | App | Goals |
|---|---|---|---|---|---|---|---|---|---|---|---|
| Falkirk | 2011–12 | 2 | 0 | 0 | 0 | 0 | 0 | 0 | 0 | 2 | 0 |
| Falkirk | 2012–3 | 0 | 0 | 0 | 0 | 0 | 0 | 0 | 0 | 0 | 0 |
| Falkirk | 2013–14 | 0 | 0 | 0 | 0 | 0 | 0 | 0 | 0 | 0 | 0 |
| Total | | 2 | 0 | 0 | 0 | 0 | 0 | 0 | 0 | 2 | 0 |
