= Kieran Duffie =

Scottish footballer

Personal information
- Date of birth: 4 March 1992 (age 34)
- Place of birth: Clydebank, Scotland
- Height: 1.92 m (6 ft 4 in)
- Position: Defender

Youth career
- 2006–2010: Falkirk

Senior career*
Years	Team	Apps	(Gls)
2010–2016	Falkirk	132	(5)
2017	East Fife	6	(0)
2017–2020	Clyde	36	(0)

International career
2008	Scotland U17	9	(0)
2010	Scotland U19	7	(0)
2010–2013	Scotland U21	6	(0)
- * Club domestic league appearances and goals

Kieran Duffie (born 4 March 1992) is a Scottish former professional footballer who played as a defender. Duffie started his career with Falkirk, spending 10 years with the side, starting with the youth development system before playing over 160 matches for the first-team before signing for East Fife on 31 March 2017 until the end of the season.

== Career ==
=== Falkirk ===
Born in Clydebank, Scotland, Duffie started his football career at Falkirk and progressed through the club's youth system. He made his Falkirk first team debut against Aberdeen in the SPL on 2 February 2010. He quickly established himself as first choice right-back and has gone on to make over 100 league appearances for Falkirk in the SPL, SFL and in the combined SPFL.

Duffie has become renowned for being an attacking full-back who likes to break forward at pace and overlap the midfield to get crosses into the box. In season 2011–12, he was a frequent supplier for striker Farid El Alagui and the 28 goals he scored, and it was mainly down to this that he was included in the PFA Scotland Team of the Year for Division One for that year. He was also in the Falkirk side that won the Scottish Challenge Cup during that season as they beat Hamilton Academical 1–0 in the final. After suffering a number of injuries that restricted his playing time, Duffie was released by Falkirk in January 2016.

=== East Fife ===
Duffie signed for East Fife in March 2017.

== International career ==
Duffie has represented Scotland at under-17, under-19 and under-21 level.

== Career statistics ==
As of match played 28 October 2017

Appearances and goals by club, season and competition
Club	Season	League			Scottish Cup		League Cup		Other		Total	
Club	Season	Division	Apps	Goals	Apps	Goals	Apps	Goals	Apps	Goals	Apps	Goals
Falkirk	2009–10	Premier League	6	0	0	0	0	0	—		6	0
Falkirk	2010–11	First Division	23	1	1	0	1	0	0	0	25	1
Falkirk	2011–12	First Division	30	1	2	0	5	0	2 (Note: Appearances in the Scottish Challenge Cup)	0	39	1
Falkirk	2012–13	First Division	29	1	4	1	2	0	2	1	37	3
Falkirk	2013–14	Championship	26	1	1	0	3	0	1	0	31	1
Falkirk	2014–15	Championship	18	1	5	0	0	0	0	0	23	1
Falkirk	2015–16	Championship	0	0	0	0	0	0	0	0	0	0
Falkirk	Falkirk total		132	5	13	1	11	0	5	1	161	7
East Fife	2016–17	League One	6	0	0	0	0	0	0	0	6	0
Clyde	2017–18	League Two	5	0	1	0	0	0	0	0	6	0
Career total			143	5	14	1	11	0	5	1	173	7

== Honours ==
Falkirk

- Scottish Challenge Cup: 2011–12
