= Blair Alston =

Scottish footballer (born 1992)

Personal information
- Full name: Blair Michael Alston
- Date of birth: 23 March 1992 (age 34)
- Place of birth: Falkirk, Scotland
- Position: Midfielder

Team information
- Current team: Forfar Athletic
- Number: 26

Senior career*
Years	Team	Apps	(Gls)
2010–2016	Falkirk	166	(24)
2016–2019	St Johnstone	80	(8)
2019–2020	Hamilton Academical	19	(1)
2020–2021	Falkirk	21	(3)
2021–2023	Kilmarnock	46	(3)
2023–2024	Partick Thistle	24	(2)
2024–2025	Stenhousemuir	28	(9)
2026–	Forfar Athletic	12	(2)
- * Club domestic league appearances and goals as of 4 May 2026

Blair Michael Alston (born 23 March 1992) is a Scottish professional footballer who plays as a midfielder for Scottish League Two club Forfar Athletic. Alston has previously played for Hamilton Academical, St Johnstone, Falkirk, Kilmarnock and Partick Thistle.

== Career ==
=== Falkirk ===
Alston made his first team debut for Falkirk against Partick Thistle in their League Cup match on 24 August 2010. He scored his first goal for the club in their 2–1 win also against Partick Thistle on 12 April 2011. On 1 April 2012, he came on as a late substitute as Falkirk beat Hamilton Academical 1–0 to win the Scottish Challenge Cup.

=== St Johnstone ===
Alston moved to St Johnstone in May 2016 under freedom of contract.

=== Hamilton Academical ===
In June 2019 he signed for Hamilton Academical.

=== Falkirk return ===
In August 2020 he signed for Falkirk on a two-year contract for a second spell at the club.

=== Kilmarnock ===
Alston left Falkirk during the 2021 close season and signed a two-year contract with Kilmarnock. Alston scored the winning goal against Arbroath in the 90th minute to secure Kilmarnock's promotion back to the Scottish Premiership.

=== Partick Thistle ===
Alston signed for Scottish Championship side Partick Thistle on a One year deal in July 2023.

Alston scored his first goal for Thistle, coming off the bench to score the winner with a back heel in a 2-1 home victory over Greenock Morton.

Alston hit form during the Scottish Premiership promotion play offs, scoring three goals for Thistle over the two legs of the semi finals against Raith Rovers, which Raith eventually won on penalties after a 3–3 draw on aggregate.

=== Stenhousemuir ===
Following his departure from Partick Thistle Alston signed with Scottish League One club Stenhousemuir in August 2024 on a two year deal.

Alston scored a hat trick in a 5–1 win over Annan Athletic in League One.

== Career statistics ==
As of 2 January 2023

Appearances and goals by club, season and competition
Club	Season	Division	League		Scottish Cup		League Cup		Other		Total	
Club	Season	Division	Apps	Goals	Apps	Goals	Apps	Goals	Apps	Goals	Apps	Goals
Falkirk	2010–11	Scottish First Division	7	1	0	0	1	0	0	0	8	1
Falkirk	2011–12	Scottish First Division	24	5	2	1	3	0	3 (Note: Appearances in the Scottish Challenge Cup)	0	32	6
Falkirk	2012–13	Scottish First Division	34	2	4	3	2	0	1	0	41	5
Falkirk	2013–14	Scottish Championship	29	3	1	0	3	1	6 (Note: Two appearances and one goal in the Scottish Challenge Cup; four appearances and two goals in the Scottish Premiership play-offs)	3	39	7
Falkirk	2014–15	Scottish Championship	36	3	5	0	3	1	3	2	47	6
Falkirk	2015–16	Scottish Championship	36	10	2	0	3	1	6 (Note: Two appearances in the Scottish Challenge Cup; four appearances and one goal in the Scottish Premiership play-offs)	1	47	12
Falkirk	Total		166	24	14	4	15	3	19	6	214	37
St Johnstone	2016–17	Scottish Premiership	35	2	2	1	5	0	—		42	3
St Johnstone	2017–18	Scottish Premiership	24	2	2	0	1	0	2 (Note: Appearances in the UEFA Europa League)	0	29	2
St Johnstone	2018–19	Scottish Premiership	21	4	0	0	5	0	—		26	4
St Johnstone	Total		80	8	4	1	11	0	2	0	97	9
Hamilton Academical	2019–20	Scottish Premiership	19	1	2	0	4	1	—		25	2
Falkirk	2020–21	Scottish League One	21	3	1	0	3	0	0	0	25	3
Kilmarnock	2021–22	Scottish Championship	31	3	1	0	5	1	3	0	40	4
Kilmarnock	2022–23	Scottish Premiership	9	0	0	0	1	0	0	0	10	0
Kilmarnock	Total		40	3	1	0	6	1	3	0	50	4
Career total			326	39	22	5	39	5	20	6	411	55

== Honours ==
Falkirk

- Scottish Challenge Cup: 2011–12

Kilmarnock

- Scottish Championship: 2021–22
