= Stephen Kingsley =

Scottish footballer

Personal information
- Full name: Stephen Iain Kingsley
- Date of birth: 23 July 1994 (age 32)
- Place of birth: Stirling, Scotland
- Positions: Left-back; centre-back

Team information
- Current team: Heart of Midlothian
- Number: 3

Youth career
- 2004–2011: Falkirk

Senior career*
Years	Team	Apps	(Gls)
2011–2014	Falkirk	88	(1)
2014–2017	Swansea City	17	(0)
2015	→ Yeovil Town (loan)	12	(0)
2015	→ Crewe Alexandra (loan)	12	(0)
2017–2020	Hull City	45	(0)
2020–	Heart of Midlothian	140	(15)

International career
2011–2012	Scotland U18	2	(0)
2012–2013	Scotland U19	6	(0)
2015–2016	Scotland U21	6	(0)
2016–2022	Scotland	2	(0)
- * Club domestic league appearances and goals as of 25 October 2026

Stephen Iain Kingsley (born 23 July 1994) is a Scottish professional footballer who plays for Scottish Premiership club Heart of Midlothian and the Scotland national team.

He has previously played for Falkirk, Swansea City, and Hull City, as well as appearing for Yeovil Town and Crewe Alexandra on loan.

== Club career ==
=== Falkirk ===
Aged 16, Kingsley made his first-team debut for Falkirk on 12 April 2011 in a 2–1 win versus Partick Thistle in the Scottish First Division. He sustained an injury in a 2011–12 Scottish League Cup tie against Brechin City that kept him out of action for over three months. He returned to the starting line-up in a League Cup win against Dundee United. In March 2013, Kingsley signed a new contract with Falkirk. Kingsley made his 100th appearance for Falkirk on 5 April 2014, in a 5–0 victory over Cowdenbeath. He was also voted in to the SPFL Championship Team of the Year for season 2013–14.

=== Swansea City ===
On 30 June 2014, Kingsley signed for Swansea City on a three-year deal for an undisclosed fee.

On 18 February 2015, Kingsley joined English League One side Yeovil Town on a month's emergency loan which was later extended until the end of the season. Kingsley played in numerous positions in his 12 appearances for the Glovers including left-back, centre-back and midfield, and received praise for his versatility from Yeovil boss Terry Skiverton. Yeovil were subsequently relegated to League Two at the end of the season and Kingsley returned to Swansea City.

Kingsley joined English League One side Crewe Alexandra on an emergency loan in August 2015. He made 12 appearances for them before returning to Swansea after the emergency loan expired in November.

He made his Swansea City debut in their FA Cup 3–2 defeat away to Oxford United, on 10 January 2016. He made his Premier League debut on 2 March 2016 in Swansea's 2–1 victory away to Arsenal.

=== Hull City ===
Kingsley moved to Championship club Hull City in August 2017 for an undisclosed fee. He was released by Hull at the end of the 2019–20 season.

=== Heart of Midlothian ===
Kingsley signed a one-year contract with Heart of Midlothian on 6 October 2020. He played and scored for Hearts in the 2020 Scottish Cup Final, which finished 3–3 after extra time, but his effort in the subsequent penalty shootout was saved by Conor Hazard as Hearts lost 4–3 on penalties.

On 21 January 2021, Kingsley signed an 18-month contract extension with Hearts, keeping him at the club until the end of the 2021–22 season. He further extended his Hearts stay in January 2022, signing a three-and-a-half-year contract and keeping him at the club until the summer of 2025. He then further extended his contract on 6 August 2024 with a new three-year contract until the summer of 2027.

Kingsley quickly became known as an efficient taker of the direct free kick, scoring several long-range strikes for Hearts since joining. He scored what proved to be the match-winning goal in the semi-final of the 2021–22 Scottish Cup – an Edinburgh derby against Hibernian – from a 30-yard free kick, albeit assisted with a wall pass from Liam Boyce.

== International career ==
In April 2012 Kingsley was called up to the Scotland under-18 squad for two games against Serbia in Belgrade on the 17th and 19th of the month. He played 90 minutes in the first game, which ended 1–1, and 60 minutes in the second game, where Scotland won 4–1. In season 2012–13 he appeared for Scotland under-19s against Germany and the Netherlands. He was selected for the squad for the 2014 UEFA European Under-19 Football Championship qualification matches in October, playing in the third game against Switzerland. This was followed in March with an appearance in the friendly match against Sweden. In May he played in two of the Elite qualifying round games in Belgium against Belgium and Georgia. In March 2015, Kingsley made his Scotland under-21 debut in a 2–1 win against Hungary. This was followed up with four appearances for the side against France twice, Northern Ireland and Iceland in their Euro Championship Qualifying group.

On 20 May 2016, Kingsley received his first call-up to the Scotland national football team for their friendlies against Italy and France. He made his Scotland debut as a substitute in a 3–0 defeat against France, on 4 June 2016.

Kingsley was recalled to the national team squad in September 2022 as a replacement for the injured Kieran Tierney and Scott McKenna. He appeared as a substitute in a goalless draw with Ukraine that secured a promotion for Scotland in the UEFA Nations League.

== Career statistics ==
=== Club ===
As of 7 November 2026

Appearances and goals by club, season and competition
Club	Season	League			National cup		League cup		Other		Total	
Club	Season	Division	Apps	Goals	Apps	Goals	Apps	Goals	Apps	Goals	Apps	Goals
Falkirk	2010–11	Scottish First Division	3	0	0	0	0	0	0	0	3	0
Falkirk	2011–12	Scottish First Division	15	0	0	0	1	0	1 (Note: Appearances in the Scottish Challenge Cup)	0	17	0
Falkirk	2012–13	Scottish First Division	35	0	4	0	2	1	2	0	43	1
Falkirk	2013–14	Scottish Championship	35	1	1	0	3	0	5 (Note: Four appearances in Scottish Premiership play-offs, one appearance in the Scottish Challenge Cup)	0	44	1
Falkirk	Total		88	1	5	0	6	1	8	0	107	2
Swansea City	2014–15	Premier League	0	0	0	0	0	0	—		0	0
Swansea City	2015–16	Premier League	4	0	1	0	0	0	—		5	0
Swansea City	2016–17	Premier League	13	0	1	0	0	0	—		14	0
Swansea City	Total		17	0	2	0	0	0	0	0	19	0
Yeovil Town (loan)	2014–15	League One	12	0	0	0	0	0	0	0	12	0
Crewe Alexandra (loan)	2015–16	League One	12	0	0	0	0	0	0	0	12	0
Hull City	2017–18	Championship	11	0	0	0	0	0	—		11	0
Hull City	2018–19	Championship	26	0	0	0	1	0	—		27	0
Hull City	2019–20	Championship	8	0	0	0	0	0	—		8	0
Hull City	Total		45	0	0	0	1	0	0	0	46	0
Heart of Midlothian	2020–21	Scottish Championship	20	4	2 (Note: Two appearances in the previous season's Scottish Cup which was rescheduled to October due to COVID-19)	1	4	0	—		26	5
Heart of Midlothian	2021–22	Scottish Premiership	33	6	5	1	5	0	—		43	7
Heart of Midlothian	2022–23	Scottish Premiership	21	0	3	0	0	0	7 (Note: Two appearances in UEFA Europa League, five appearances in UEFA Europa Conference League)	0	31	0
Heart of Midlothian	2023–24	Scottish Premiership	32	1	4	0	3	0	4 (Note: Appearances in UEFA Europa Conference League)	0	43	1
Heart of Midlothian	2024–25	Scottish Premiership	9	1	1	0	1	0	4	0	15	1
Heart of Midlothian	2025–26	Scottish Premiership	21	2	0	0	3	1	0	0	24	3
Heart of Midlothian	2026–27	Scottish Premiership	4	1	0	0	2	0	4	0	10	1
Heart of Midlothian	Total		140	15	15	2	18	1	19	0	192	18
Career total			314	16	22	2	25	2	27	0	388	20

=== International ===
Appearances and goals by national team and year
National team	Year	Apps	Goals
Scotland	2016	1	0
Scotland	2022	1	0
Total		2	0

== Honours ==
Falkirk

- Scottish Challenge Cup: 2012

Heart of Midlothian

- Scottish Championship: 2020-21
