= Craig Sibbald =

Scottish footballer

Personal information
- Full name: Craig Alexander Sibbald
- Date of birth: 18 May 1995 (age 31)
- Place of birth: Falkirk, Scotland
- Height: 5 ft 7 in (1.70 m)
- Position: Midfielder

Team information
- Current team: Falkirk
- Number: 10

Senior career*
Years	Team	Apps	(Gls)
2011–2018	Falkirk	214	(30)
2018–2022	Livingston	90	(6)
2022–2026	Dundee United	111	(10)
2026–	Falkirk	4	(0)

International career
2010–2011	Scotland U16	3	(0)
2012	Scotland U17	2	(0)
- * Club domestic league appearances and goals as of 20 May 2026

Craig Alexander Sibbald (born 18 May 1995) is a Scottish professional footballer who plays as a midfielder for Scottish Premiership club Dundee United. He has previously played for Falkirk and Livingston, and represented Scotland at under-16 and under-17 level. Sibbald won the Scottish Challenge Cup with Falkirk during the 2011-12 season and the Scottish Championship in season 2023-24 with Dundee United.

== Club career ==
=== Falkirk ===
Sibbald made his first team debut for Falkirk aged 16, in a 2–1 win against Brechin City in the 2011–12 Scottish Challenge Cup. This was quickly followed by his first start in the league on 6 August against Raith Rovers.

Sibbald signed a contract extension with Falkirk on 3 July 2014, which contracted him to the club until 2017. He signed a new one-year contract with Falkirk on 11 August 2017, after an unsuccessful trial with Luton Town.

=== Livingston ===
Sibbald signed for newly promoted Scottish Premiership club Livingston on 30 May 2018 on a two-year contract.

=== Dundee United ===
During July 2022 Sibbald joined Dundee United on a two-year deal.

== International career ==
Sibbald was capped three times for the Scottish under-16 team from 2010 to 2011. On 17 August 2011, Sibbald was called up to the Scottish under-17 team to participate in the 2011 International Youth Toto Cup. He was capped twice for Scotland at under-17 level in 2012.

== Career statistics ==
As of match played 7 March 2026

Appearances and goals by club, season and competition
Club	Season	League			Scottish Cup		League Cup		Other		Total	
Club	Season	Division	Apps	Goals	Apps	Goals	Apps	Goals	Apps	Goals	Apps	Goals
Falkirk	2011–12	Scottish First Division	26	2	2	0	4	1	5 (Note: Appearances in Scottish Challenge Cup)	1	37	4
Falkirk	2012–13	Scottish First Division	20	2	2	1	2	0	2	0	26	3
Falkirk	2013–14	Scottish Championship	34	4	1	0	3	0	7 (Note: Three appearances in Scottish Challenge Cup, four appearances and one goal in Scottish Premiership play-offs)	1	45	5
Falkirk	2014–15	Scottish Championship	36	4	5	3	3	0	2	0	46	7
Falkirk	2015–16	Scottish Championship	36	4	2	0	3	0	5 (Note: One appearance in Scottish Challenge Cup, four in Scottish Premiership play-offs)	0	46	4
Falkirk	2016–17	Scottish Championship	36	10	1	0	4	0	4 (Note: Two appearances in Scottish Challenge Cup, two in Scottish Premiership play-offs)	0	45	10
Falkirk	2017–18	Scottish Championship	26	4	3	1	0	0	0	0	29	5
Falkirk	Total		214	30	16	5	19	1	25	2	274	38
Livingston	2018–19	Scottish Premiership	26	3	0	0	3	0	—		29	3
Livingston	2019–20	Scottish Premiership	18	2	2	0	1	2	—		21	4
Livingston	2020–21	Scottish Premiership	32	1	2	0	7	1	—		41	2
Livingston	2021–22	Scottish Premiership	14	0	0	0	4	1	—		18	1
Livingston	Total		90	6	4	0	15	4	0	0	108	10
Dundee United	2022–23	Scottish Premiership	35	1	2	0	2	0	2 (Note: Appearances in UEFA Conference League)	0	41	1
Dundee United	2023–24	Scottish Championship	33	4	1	0	3	1	2	0	39	5
Dundee United	2024–25	Scottish Premiership	16	1	0	0	6	0	—		22	1
Dundee United	2025–26	Scottish Premiership	23	4	2	0	1	0	4	0	30	4
Dundee United	Total		107	10	5	0	12	1	8	0	132	11
Career total			411	46	25	5	46	6	33	2	515	59

== Honours ==
=== Club ===
Falkirk

- Scottish Challenge Cup: 2011–12

Dundee United

- Scottish Championship: 2023-24

=== Individual ===
- Scottish Football League Young Player of the Month: August 2011
