= 2012–13 Falkirk F.C. season =

Falkirk
2012–13 season
- Chairman: Martin Ritchie
- Manager: Steven Pressley (until 8 March 2013); Alex Smith (interim) (8 March-7 April 2013); Gary Holt (from 8 April 2013)
- Stadium: Falkirk Stadium
- First Division: 3rd
- Challenge Cup: Second round (eliminated by Rangers)
- League Cup: Second round (eliminated by Rangers)
- Scottish Cup: Semi-final (eliminated by Hibernian)
- Top goalscorer: League: Lyle Taylor (24); All: Lyle Taylor (29)
- Highest home attendance: 4,804 v Partick Thistle, 20 April 2013
- Lowest home attendance: 2,288 v Dumbarton, 16 April 2013
- Average home league attendance: League: 3,176
Home colours	Away colours

The 2012–13 season was Falkirk's third consecutive season in the Scottish First Division, having been relegated from the Scottish Premier League at the end of season 2009–10. Falkirk also competed in the Challenge Cup, League Cup and the Scottish Cup.

== Summary ==
=== Season ===
During season 2012–13 Falkirk finished third in the Scottish First Division. They reached the second round of the Challenge Cup, the second round of the League Cup and the Semi-final of the Scottish Cup.

=== Management ===
Falkirk began the season under the management of Steven Pressley. On 8 March 2013, Pressley left the club to take up the manager post at Coventry City after compensation was agreed. The club's technical director Alex Smith took over as interim manager with Stevie Crawford acting as his assistant.

On 3 April, the club announced that Gary Holt would take over as manager from 8 April 2013.

== Results & fixtures ==
Win Draw Loss Postponed

=== Preseason ===
A match against Stenhousemuir scheduled for 24 July, was cancelled.

7 July 2012 Friendly (Closed Door)	Stirling Albion	0–3	Falkirk	Forthbank Stadium
15:00		Report	J Fulton 10'; D Fulton 24' (Penalty); Trialist 52'	Attendance: 0

9 July 2012 Friendly	Formartine United	1–1	Falkirk	North Lodge Park
19:30	Park	Report	Brisbane

11 July 2012 Friendly	Turriff United	2–5	Falkirk	The Haughs
20:00	Fraser 2'; Henderson 9'	Report	Trialist 6'; Dick 11'; Haworth 30'; White 57'; Kingsley 78'	Referee: Sim

14 July 2012 Friendly	Fraserburgh	1–4	Falkirk	Bellslea Park
15:00	Main 18' (Penalty)	Report	Trialist 7'; Alston 19'; Haworth 55'; Trialist 59'	Referee: Shaw

15 July 2012 Friendly	Spartans	0–0	Falkirk	Ainslie Park
15:00		Report		Referee: Duncan

17 July 2012 Friendly	Alloa Athletic	2–1	Falkirk	Recreation Park
19:30	Cawley 61'; McCord	Report	Small 73'	Referee: Charleston

18 July 2012 Friendly	Falkirk	1–0	Heart of Midlothian	Falkirk Stadium
19:45	Leahy 52'	Hearts Report; Scotsman Report		Attendance: 1,622; Referee: Muir

21 July 2012 Friendly	East Fife	2–0	Falkirk	Bayview Stadium
15:00	Samuel; Malcolm	Report

22 July 2012 Friendly	Falkirk	3–7	Middlesbrough	Falkirk Stadium
16:05	Taylor 5', 39', 47' (pen.)	Report	Williams 15', 20'; Leadbitter 31'; Ledesma 53'; Bailey 56'; McDonald 78', 90'	Attendance: 1,621; Referee: Madden

25 July 2012 Friendly	Falkirk	1–1	Bolton Wanderers	Falkirk Stadium
19:30	Taylor 1'	Report	Eagles 14'

=== Scottish First Division ===
11 August 2012	Partick Thistle	3–1	Falkirk	Firhill Stadium
15:00	Lawless 4'; Doolan 7', 57'	SFL Report	Taylor 53'	Attendance: 3,487; Referee: Salmond

18 August 2012	Falkirk	0–2	Raith Rovers	Falkirk Stadium
15:00		SFL Report	Walker 45'; Clarke 46'	Attendance: 3,064; Referee: O'Reilly

25 August 2012	Greenock Morton	1–2	Falkirk	Cappielow
15:00	Campbell 31'	SFL Report	Fulton 9'; Taylor 39'	Attendance: 1,756; Referee: Thomson

2 September 2012	Falkirk	1–2	Livingston	Falkirk Stadium
15:00	Murdoch 34' (pen.); Dods (yellow card) 88' (red card)	SFL Report	Fordyce 39'; Watson (red card) 49'; Andreu 90'	Attendance: 2,974; Referee: Norris

15 September 2012	Hamilton Academical	1–1	Falkirk	New Douglas Park
15:00	Routledge 42'	SFL Report	Taylor 5'	Attendance: 1,174; Referee: Beaton

22 September 2012	Falkirk	1–1	Airdrie United	Falkirk Stadium
15:00	Murdoch 35' (pen.)	SFL Report	Cook 68'	Attendance: 2,951; Referee: McLean

29 September 2012	Cowdenbeath	1–1	Falkirk	Central Park
15:00	Coult 18'	SFL Report	Weatherston 3'	Attendance: 699; Referee: O'Reilly

6 October 2012	Falkirk	2–2	Dunfermline Athletic	Falkirk Stadium
15:00	Taylor 30', 55'	SFL Report	Barrowman 79'; Thomson 82'	Attendance: 4,691; Referee: Colvin

20 October 2012	Dumbarton	0–2	Falkirk	Dumbarton Football Stadium
15:00		SFL Report	Taylor 16'; Weatherston 32'	Attendance: 1,041; Referee: Finnie

27 October 2012	Falkirk	0–0	Partick Thistle	Falkirk Stadium
15:00		SFL Report		Attendance: 3,818; Referee: Madden

10 November 2012	Raith Rovers	2–1	Falkirk	Stark's Park
15:00	Smith 56'; Anderson 85'	SFL Report	Leahy 43'	Attendance: 1,986; Referee: McKendrick

17 November 2012	Livingston	2–1	Falkirk	Braidwood Motor Company Stadium
15:00	McNulty 23'; Jacobs 65'	SFL Report	McGrandles 84'	Attendance: 1,471; Referee: Charleston

24 November 2012	Falkirk	2–1	Hamilton Academical	Falkirk Stadium
15:00	McGrandles 83'; Small 91'	SFL Report	Page 58'	Attendance: 2,682; Referee: Tumilty

8 December 2012	Airdrie United	P–P	Falkirk	Excelsior Stadium
15:00		SFL Report
Note: Postponed due to frozen pitch

15 December 2012	Falkirk	2–0	Cowdenbeath	Falkirk Stadium
15:00	Murdoch 33' (pen.); Taylor 42'	SFL Report		Attendance: 2,647; Referee: Robertson

22 December 2012	Airdrie United	1–4	Falkirk	Excelsior Stadium
15:00	Donnelly 56'; Blockley (yellow card) 79' (yellow-red card)	SFL Report	Fulton 43'; Taylor 67', 80', 90'	Attendance: 914; Referee: Clancy

26 December 2012	Dunfermline Athletic	0–1	Falkirk	East End Park
15:00	McMillan (red card) 41'	SFL Report	Duffie (yellow card) 85' (yellow-red card); Alston 90'	Attendance: 5,746; Referee: Finnie

29 December 2012	Falkirk	3–4	Dumbarton	Falkirk Stadium
15:00	Taylor 43', 86', 89'; Dods (red card) 67'	SFL Report	Lister 45+2', 79'; Agnew 67' (pen.); Creaney (red card) 82'	Attendance: 3,097; Referee: Salmond

2 January 2013	Falkirk	P–P	Livingston	Falkirk Stadium
15:00		BBC Report
Note: Postponed due to waterlogged pitch

5 January 2013	Hamilton Academical	1–1	Falkirk	New Douglas Park
15:00	Mackinnon 80'	SFL Report	Taylor 13'; Flynn (yellow card) 58' (red card)	Attendance: 1,423; Referee: Colvin

12 January 2013	Falkirk	0–1	Greenock Morton	Falkirk Stadium
15:00		SFL Report	Hardie 64'	Attendance: 3,078; Referee: Allan

19 January 2013	Partick Thistle	4–1	Falkirk	Firhill Stadium
15:00	Balatoni 4', 62'; Erskine 20', 64'	SFL Report	Taylor 18'	Attendance: 3,280; Referee: Beaton

26 January 2013	Falkirk	4–3	Airdrie United	Falkirk Stadium
15:00	Taylor 9', 35'; Murdoch 24'; Dods 73'	SFL Report	Di Giacomo 57' (pen.); McLaren 88'; Boyle 90'	Attendance: 2,715; Referee: Roache

9 February 2013	Cowdenbeath	4–1	Falkirk	Central Park
15:00	Armstrong 35', 73'; Hemmings 38'; Stevenson 90+1'	SFL Report	Taylor 2'	Attendance: 566; Referee: Finnie

16 February 2013	Falkirk	1–0	Dunfermline	Falkirk Stadium
15:00	Weatherston 86'	SFL Report		Attendance: 3,680; Referee: McLean

19 February 2013	Falkirk	2–0	Livingston	Falkirk Stadium
19:45	Taylor 39', 63'	SFL Report		Attendance: 2,583; Referee: Brines

23 February 2013	Dumbarton	0–2	Falkirk	Dumbarton Football Stadium
15:00		SFL Report	Grant 25'; Weatherston 30'	Attendance: 997; Referee: Somers

5 March 2013	Falkirk	1–1	Raith Rovers	Falkirk Stadium
19:45	Murdoch 90+2'	SFL Report	Graham 30'	Attendance: 2,428; Referee: Muir

9 March 2013	Greenock Morton	2–0	Falkirk	Cappielow
15:00	Campbell 30'; MacDonald 44'	SFL Report		Attendance: 1,962; Referee: Murray

16 March 2013	Livingston	P–P	Falkirk	Braidwood Motor Company Stadium
15:00		BBC Report
Note: Snow on pitch

23 March 2013	Falkirk	0–2	Hamilton Academical	Falkirk Stadium
15:00		SFL Report	Routledge 14'; Longridge 26'	Attendance: 2,616; Referee: Tumilty

27 March 2013	Dunfermline Athletic	0–2	Falkirk	East End Park
19:45		SFL Report	Taylor 10'; Alston 88'	Attendance: 2,879; Referee: Salmond

30 March 2013	Airdrie United	0–1	Falkirk	Excelsior Stadium
15:00		BBC Report	Taylor 58'; Taylor (yellow card) 67' (yellow-red card)	Attendance: 790; Referee: Northcroft

2 April 2013	Livingston	1–2	Falkirk	Almondvale Stadium
19:45	Russell 26' (pen.); Russell (yellow card) 82' (yellow-red card)	SFL Report	Higgins 62'; Talbot 73' (o.g.)	Attendance: 1,100; Referee: Colvin

6 April 2013	Falkirk	4–0	Cowdenbeath	Falkirk Stadium
15:00	Dods 69'; Sibbald 78'; Higgins 87' (pen.), 89'	SFL Report		Attendance: 2,539; Referee: Murray

16 April 2013	Falkirk	1–3	Dumbarton	Falkirk Stadium
19:45	Taylor 33'	SFL Report	Gilhaney 19'; Fleming 21', 65'	Attendance: 2,288; Referee: McKendrick

20 April 2013	Falkirk	0–2	Partick Thistle	Falkirk Stadium
15:00		SFL Report	Dowie 50'; Doolan 78'	Attendance: 4,804; Referee: Finnie

27 April 2013	Raith Rovers	0–0	Falkirk	Stark's Park
15:00		SFL Report		Attendance: 1,406; Referee: McLean

4 May 2013	Falkirk	4–1	Greenock Morton	Falkirk Stadium
15:00	Sibbald 60'; Taylor 64' (pen.); Duffie 79'; Higgins 88'	SFL Report	McLaughlin 27'	Attendance: 3,179; Referee: Anderson

=== Scottish Challenge Cup ===
28 July 2012 Scottish Challenge Cup round 1	Falkirk	3–0	Stirling Albion	Falkirk Stadium
15:00	Duffie 34'; Taylor 51', 57'	SFL Report		Attendance: 1,532; Referee: Mckendrick

21 August 2012 Scottish Challenge Cup round 2	Falkirk	0–1	Rangers	Falkirk Stadium
19:45		BBC Report; SFL Report	Little 45'	Attendance: 6,747; Referee: Murray

=== Scottish League Cup ===
4 August 2012 First round	Falkirk	2–0	Elgin City	Falkirk Stadium
15:00	Kingsley 67'; Taylor 89'	SFL Report		Attendance: 1,549; Referee: Allan

30 August 2012 Second round	Rangers	3–0	Falkirk	Ibrox Stadium
19:45	McCulloch 18', 52'; Little 32'	BBC Report; SFL Report		Attendance: 26,450; Referee: Muir

=== Scottish Cup ===
1 December 2012 Fourth round	Stenhousemuir	0–1	Falkirk	Ochilview Park
15:00		BBC Report	Duffie 9'	Attendance: 1,758; Referee: Northcroft

2 February 2013 Fifth round	Falkirk	4–1	Forfar Athletic	Falkirk Stadium
15:00	Taylor 19', 83'; Murdoch 68'; Weatherston 75'	BBC Report	Campbell 21' (pen.)	Attendance: 1,967; Referee: Clancy

2 March 2013 Quarter-final	Hamilton Academical	1–2	Falkirk	New Douglas Park
15:00	Ryan 74'; Page (red card) 90+3'	BBC Report	Alston 44', 71'	Attendance: 3,452; Referee: Collum

13 April 2013 Semi-final	Hibernian	4–3 (a.e.t.)	Falkirk	Hampden Park
12:30	Harris 51'; Griffiths 78', 115'; Doyle 83'	BBC Report	Sibbald 6'; Fulton 18'; Alston 30'	Attendance: 22,410; Referee: Brines

== Player statistics ==
=== Captains ===
No.	P	Name	Country	No. games	Notes
	DF	Darren Dods	(Scotland)	33	Club captain

Last updated: 8 May 2013
Source: Competitive match reports.
Competitive matches only
Matches started as captain only
Country: FIFA nationality; No.: Squad number; P: Position; Name: Player name; No. Games: Number of games started as captain.

=== Squad ===
Last updated 8 May 2013

No.	Pos	Nat	Player	Total		First Division		Challenge Cup		League Cup		Scottish Cup	
No.	Pos	Nat	Player	Apps	Goals	Apps	Goals	Apps	Goals	Apps	Goals	Apps	Goals
	GK	(Scotland) SCO	Graham Bowman	1	0	1+0	0	0+0	0	0+0	0	0+0	0
	GK	(Northern Ireland) NIR	Michael McGovern	43	0	35+0	0	2+0	0	2+0	0	4+0	0
	DF	(England) ENG	Rhys Bennett	0	0	0+0	0	0+0	0	0+0	0	0+0	0
	DF	(Scotland) SCO	Steven Brisbane	0	0	0+0	0	0+0	0	0+0	0	0+0	0
	DF	(Scotland) SCO	Darren Dods	33	2	27+0	2	1+0	0	1+0	0	4+0	0
	DF	(Scotland) SCO	Kieran Duffie	37	3	28+1	1	2+0	1	2+0	0	4+0	1
	DF	(Scotland) SCO	Liam Dick	5	0	3+0	0	0+1	0	0+0	0	0+1	0
	DF	(Northern Ireland) NIR	Johnny Flynn	41	0	33+0	0	2+0	0	2+0	0	4+0	0
	DF	(Scotland) SCO	Stephen Kingsley	43	1	35+0	0	2+0	0	2+0	1	4+0	0
	DF	(Scotland) SCO	Ryan McGeever	8	0	6+1	0	0+0	0	0+0	0	0+1	0
	DF	(Scotland) SCO	Robbie Neilson	3	0	3+0	0	0+0	0	0+0	0	0+0	0
	DF	(Scotland) SCO	Liam Rowan	2	0	2+0	0	0+0	0	0+0	0	0+0	0
	DF	(Scotland) SCO	Chris Smith	9	0	4+2	0	1+0	0	1+1	0	0+0	0
	DF	(England) ENG	Will Vaulks	6	0	4+2	0	0+0	0	0+0	0	0+0	0
	MF	(Scotland) SCO	Blair Alston	41	5	27+7	2	1+0	0	1+1	0	3+1	3
	MF	(Scotland) SCO	Kristopher Faulds	2	0	1+1	0	0+0	0	0+0	0	0+0	0
	MF	(Scotland) SCO	Jay Fulton	35	3	23+5	2	2+0	0	2+0	0	3+0	1
	MF	(Scotland) SCO	Dale Fulton	12	0	5+3	0	0+1	0	0+2	0	0+1	0
	MF	(Scotland) SCO	Thomas Grant	27	1	15+8	1	0+0	0	0+0	0	2+2	0
	MF	(England) ENG	Andy Haworth	16	0	7+5	0	1+1	0	1+1	0	0+0	0
	MF	(England) ENG	Luke Leahy	10	1	5+3	1	1+0	0	1+0	0	0+0	0
	MF	(Scotland) SCO	Conor McGrandles	30	2	23+3	2	0+0	0	0+0	0	4+0	0
	MF	(Scotland) SCO	Stewart Murdoch	40	6	32+0	5	2+0	0	2+0	0	4+0	1
	MF	(Scotland) SCO	Iain Flannigan	3	0	2+1	0	0	0	0	0	0	0
	FW	(Scotland) SCO	Sean Higgins	29	4	14+11	4	0+0	0	0+0	0	1+3	0
	FW	(Scotland) SCO	Craig Sibbald	26	3	11+9	2	2+0	0	2+0	0	2+0	1
	FW	(Scotland) SCO	Lewis Small	12	1	0+11	1	0+0	0	0+0	0	0+1	0
	FW	(England) ENG	Lyle Taylor	42	29	33+1	24	2+0	2	2+0	1	4+0	2
	FW	(Scotland) SCO	David Weatherston	29	5	16+8	4	1+0	0	1+0	0	1+2	1
	FW	(Scotland) SCO	Jordan White	5	0	0+3	0	0+2	0	0+0	0	0+0	0

=== Disciplinary record ===
Includes all competitive matches.

Last updated 8 May 2013

Nation	Position	Name	First Division		Challenge Cup		League Cup		Scottish Cup		Total	
Nation	Position	Name	Yellow card	Red card	Yellow card	Red card	Yellow card	Red card	Yellow card	Red card	Yellow card	Red card
(Scotland)	GK	Graham Bowman	0	0	0	0	0	0	0	0	0	0
(Northern Ireland)	GK	Michael McGovern	1	1	0	0	0	0	0	0	1	0
(England)	DF	Rhys Bennett	0	0	0	0	0	0	0	0	0	0
(Scotland)	DF	Steven Brisbane	0	0	0	0	0	0	0	0	0	0
(Scotland)	DF	Darren Dods	5	2	0	0	0	0	1	0	6	2
(Scotland)	DF	Kieran Duffie	5	1	0	0	0	0	0	0	5	1
(Scotland)	DF	Liam Dick	0	0	0	0	0	0	0	0	0	0
(Northern Ireland)	DF	Johnny Flynn	7	1	0	0	0	0	0	0	7	1
(Scotland)	DF	Stephen Kingsley	0	0	0	0	0	0	0	0	0	0
(Scotland)	DF	Ryan McGeever	0	0	0	0	0	0	0	0	0	0
(Scotland)	DF	Robbie Neilson	0	0	0	0	0	0	0	0	0	0
(Scotland)	DF	Liam Rowan	0	0	0	0	0	0	0	0	0	0
(Scotland)	DF	Chris Smith	2	0	0	0	0	0	0	0	2	0
(England)	DF	Will Vaulks	1	0	0	0	0	0	0	0	1	0
(Scotland)	MF	Blair Alston	3	0	0	0	0	0	1	0	4	0
(Scotland)	MF	Kristopher Faulds	0	0	0	0	0	0	0	0	0	0
(Scotland)	MF	Jay Fulton	2	0	0	0	0	0	0	0	2	0
(Scotland)	MF	Dale Fulton	4	0	0	0	0	0	0	0	4	0
(Scotland)		Thomas Grant	1	0	0	0	0	0	0	0	1	0
(England)	MF	Andy Haworth	1	0	1	0	0	0	0	0	2	0
(Scotland)	MF	Conor McGrandles	2	0	0	0	0	0	1	0	3	0
(England)	MF	Luke Leahy	1	0	0	0	0	0	0	0	1	0
(Scotland)	MF	Stewart Murdoch	6	0	0	0	0	0	1	0	7	0
(Scotland)	MF	Iain Flannigan	1	0	0	0	0	0	0	0	1	0
(Scotland)	FW	Sean Higgins	3	0	0	0	0	0	1	0	4	0
(Scotland)	FW	Craig Sibbald	0	0	1	0	0	0	1	0	2	0
(Scotland)	FW	Lewis Small	0	0	0	0	0	0	0	0	0	0
(England)	FW	Lyle Taylor	6	1	1	0	0	0	1	0	8	1
(Scotland)	FW	David Weatherston	0	0	0	0	0	0	0	0	0	0
(Scotland)	FW	Jordan White	0	0	0	0	0	0	0	0	0	0

== Team statistics ==
=== League table ===
Pos	Team	Pld	W	D	L	GF	GA	GD	Pts	Promotion or relegation
1	Partick Thistle (C, P)	36	23	9	4	76	28	+48	78	Promotion to the Premiership
2	Greenock Morton	36	20	7	9	73	47	+26	67	
3	Falkirk	36	15	8	13	52	48	+4	53	
4	Livingston	36	14	10	12	58	56	+2	52	
5	Hamilton Academical	36	14	9	13	52	45	+7	51	

Source: SPFL Archive
Rules for classification: 1) points; 2) goal difference; 3) number of goals scored.
(C) Champions; (P) Promoted

=== Division summary ===
Round	1	2	3	4	5	6	7	8	9	10	11	12	13	14	15	16	17	18	19	20	21	22	23	24	25	26	27	28	29	30	31	32	33	34	35	36
Ground	A	H	A	H	A	H	A	H	A	H	A	A	H	H	A	A	H	A	H	A	H	A	H	H	A	H	A	H	A	A	A	H	H	H	A	H
Result	L	L	W	L	D	D	D	D	W	D	L	L	W	W	W	W	L	D	L	L	W	L	W	W	W	D	L	L	W	W	W	W	L	L	D	W
Position	7	9	6	8	8	7	8	7	7	7	7	8	6	6	6	4	4	5	6	6	5	5	5	5	5	5	5	5	5	4	3	3	4	4	5	3

Updated to match(es) played on 8 May 2013. Source:
A = Away; H = Home; W = Win; D = Draw; L = Loss

== Transfers ==
=== Players in ===
Player	From	Fee
(Scotland) Ryan McGeever	(Scotland) Queen's Park	Free
(Northern Ireland) Johnny Flynn	(Scotland) Ross County	Undisclosed
(Scotland) Chris Smith	(Scotland) Ayr United	Free
(England) Andy Haworth	(England) Bury	Free
(England) Luke Leahy	(England) Rugby Town	Free
(England) Lyle Taylor	(England) Bournemouth	Free
(Scotland) Sean Higgins	(Scotland) St Johnstone	Free
(England) Will Vaulks	(England) Workington	Free
(Scotland) Iain Flannigan	Unattached	Free

=== Players out ===
Player	To	Fee
(Scotland) Ryan Millar	(Scotland) Alloa Athletic	Free
(Scotland) Ally Graham	(Scotland) Clydebank	Free
(Scotland) Conor Kelly	(Scotland) Alloa Athletic	Free
(Scotland) Tam Scobbie	(Scotland) St Johnstone	Free
(Scotland) Mark Millar	(Scotland) Dundee United	Free
(Scotland) Willie Gibson	(Scotland) Queen of the South	Free
(Scotland) Blair Munn	(Scotland) Alloa Athletic	Free
(England) Jack Compton	(England) Portsmouth	Free
(Morocco) Farid El Alagui	(England) Brentford	Free
(Scotland) Jordan White	(Scotland) Stirling Albion	Loan
(England) Andy Haworth	(England) Rochdale	Free
(Scotland) Jordan White	(Scotland) Stirling Albion	Free
