= Conor McGrandles =

Scottish footballer (born 1995)

Personal information
- Full name: Conor McGrandles
- Date of birth: 24 September 1995 (age 31)
- Place of birth: Falkirk, Scotland
- Height: 6 ft 1 in (1.85 m)
- Position: Midfielder

Team information
- Current team: Lincoln City
- Number: 14

Youth career
- –2012: Falkirk

Senior career*
| Years | Team | Apps | (Gls) |
| 2012–2014 | Falkirk | 65 | (7) |
| 2014–2017 | Norwich City | 1 | (0) |
| 2016 | → Falkirk (loan) | 5 | (0) |
| 2017–2020 | Milton Keynes Dons | 75 | (2) |
| 2020–2022 | Lincoln City | 78 | (6) |
| 2022–2024 | Charlton Athletic | 12 | (1) |
| 2023 | → Cambridge United (loan) | 19 | (0) |
| 2024 | → Lincoln City (loan) | 5 | (0) |
| 2024– | Lincoln City | 99 | (1) |
- * Club domestic league appearances and goals as of 09:08, 8 November 2026 (UTC)

Conor McGrandles (born 24 September 1995) is a Scottish professional footballer who plays as a midfielder for EFL Championship club Lincoln City.

== Club career ==
=== Falkirk ===
Born in Falkirk, McGrandles is a product of the Falkirk youth academy, moving into the first team at the start of the 2012–13 season. He made his first team début on 29 September 2012, against Cowdenbeath at Central Park, five days after his 17th birthday. His first senior goal came seven weeks later, against Livingston at Almondvale in the 84th minute.

=== Norwich City ===
McGrandles was transferred to Norwich City in August 2014. In January 2016, McGrandles returned to Falkirk on loan until the end of the season. On 20 February 2016, McGrandles was stretchered off during Falkirk's 1–0 win at Greenock Morton after suffering a double break in his right leg.

=== Milton Keynes Dons ===
McGrandles signed a two-year contract with Milton Keynes Dons in May 2017. On 4 August 2018, during the opening league game of the season away to Oldham Athletic, McGrandles sustained a serious facial fracture resulting in a three-month absence. He made his return to the first team on 13 November 2018, starting in an EFL Trophy group fixture against Brighton & Hove Albion U21s. McGrandles scored his first goal for the club on 16 February 2019, the opening goal in a 3–2 away win over Carlisle United.

=== Lincoln City ===
Following the termination of his contract at Milton Keynes Dons, he signed a contract with League One rivals, Lincoln City on the 27 July 2020. He made his debut for Lincoln starting the game in the EFL Cup on 5 September 2020. He would score his first goal for the club at home to Northampton Town on the 23 January 2021. Lincoln offered him a new contract at the end of the 2021–22 season, but it was revealed that he had turned that offer down to explore other options.

=== Charlton Athletic ===
On 29 June 2022, McGrandles joined Charlton Athletic on a three-year contract following the expiry of his contract at Lincoln City.

==== Cambridge United (loan) ====
On 24 January 2023, McGrandles joined Cambridge United on loan for the rest of the 2022–23 season.

==== Lincoln City (loan) ====
On 1 February 2024, McGrandles re-joined Lincoln City on loan for the rest of the 2023–24 season. He made his second debut the following weekend, coming off the bench in the 1–0 victory against Burton Albion. He made five appearances on returning to Lincoln, before an ankle injury ruled him out for the remainder of the season.

=== Return to Lincoln City ===
On 14 June 2024, McGrandles rejoined Lincoln City on a permanent deal signing a two-year deal. He made his third debut for the club, starting against Mansfield Town on 24 August 2024, which finished in a 4–1 win. In January 2026, the club exercised their one-year option, extending this contract until the summer of 2027. He was voted Lincoln City's players player of the season, following the end of the 2025–26 season.

On 22 July 2026, he signed a new two-year contract, with a club option of a further 12 months.

== Career statistics ==
As of 7 November 2026

| Club | Season | League | | | National Cup | | League Cup | | Other (Note: Appearances in other competitions including the EFL Trophy, the Scottish Championship play-offs and the League One Play-offs) | | Total | |
| Club | Season | Division | Apps | Goals | Apps | Goals | Apps | Goals | Apps | Goals | Apps | Goals |
|---|---|---|---|---|---|---|---|---|---|---|---|---|
| Falkirk | 2012–13 | Scottish First Division | 26 | 2 | 4 | 0 | 0 | 0 | — | | 30 | 2 |
| Falkirk | 2013–14 | Scottish Championship | 36 | 5 | 1 | 0 | 4 | 1 | 4 | 0 | 45 | 6 |
| Falkirk | 2014–15 | Scottish Championship | 3 | 0 | 0 | 0 | 3 | 0 | — | | 6 | 0 |
| Falkirk (loan) | 2015–16 | Scottish Championship | 5 | 0 | 0 | 0 | 0 | 0 | — | | 5 | 0 |
| Falkirk (loan) | Total | | 70 | 7 | 5 | 0 | 7 | 1 | 4 | 0 | 86 | 8 |
| Norwich City | 2014–15 | Championship | 1 | 0 | 0 | 0 | 0 | 0 | 0 | 0 | 1 | 0 |
| Norwich City | 2015–16 | Championship | 0 | 0 | 0 | 0 | 0 | 0 | 0 | 0 | 0 | 0 |
| Norwich City | 2016–17 | Championship | 0 | 0 | 0 | 0 | 0 | 0 | 0 | 0 | 0 | 0 |
| Norwich City | Total | | 1 | 0 | 0 | 0 | 0 | 0 | 0 | 0 | 1 | 0 |
| Milton Keynes Dons | 2017–18 | League One | 19 | 0 | 4 | 0 | 1 | 0 | 3 | 0 | 27 | 0 |
| Milton Keynes Dons | 2018–19 | League Two | 25 | 1 | 0 | 0 | 0 | 0 | 1 | 0 | 26 | 1 |
| Milton Keynes Dons | 2019–20 | League One | 31 | 1 | 1 | 0 | 2 | 1 | 4 | 1 | 38 | 3 |
| Milton Keynes Dons | Total | | 75 | 2 | 5 | 0 | 3 | 1 | 8 | 1 | 91 | 4 |
| Lincoln City | 2020–21 | League One | 39 | 4 | 2 | 0 | 3 | 0 | 7 (Note: Appearance(s) in League One Play-offs & Football League Trophy) | 0 | 51 | 4 |
| Lincoln City | 2021–22 | League One | 39 | 2 | 2 | 0 | 1 | 0 | 3 (Note: Appearance(s) in Football League Trophy) | 0 | 45 | 2 |
| Lincoln City | Total | | 78 | 6 | 4 | 0 | 4 | 0 | 10 | 0 | 96 | 6 |
| Charlton Athletic | 2022–23 | League One | 9 | 0 | 1 | 0 | 0 | 0 | 2 (Note: Two appearances in the EFL Trophy) | 0 | 12 | 0 |
| Charlton Athletic | 2023–24 | League One | 3 | 1 | 2 | 0 | 1 | 0 | 1 (Note: One appearance in the EFL Trophy) | 1 | 7 | 2 |
| Charlton Athletic | Total | | 12 | 1 | 3 | 0 | 1 | 0 | 3 | 1 | 19 | 2 |
| Cambridge United (loan) | 2022–23 | League One | 19 | 0 | 0 | 0 | 0 | 0 | 0 | 0 | 19 | 0 |
| Lincoln City (loan) | 2023–24 | League One | 5 | 0 | 0 | 0 | 0 | 0 | 0 | 0 | 5 | 0 |
| Lincoln City | 2024–25 | League One | 42 | 0 | 2 | 1 | 0 | 0 | 1 (Note: One appearance in the EFL Trophy) | 0 | 45 | 1 |
| Lincoln City | 2025–26 | League One | 45 | 1 | 1 | 0 | 3 | 0 | 1 (Note: One appearance in the EFL Trophy) | 0 | 50 | 1 |
| Lincoln City | 2026–27 | Championship | 12 | 0 | 0 | 0 | 1 | 0 | 0 | 0 | 13 | 0 |
| Lincoln City | Total | | 99 | 1 | 3 | 1 | 4 | 0 | 2 | 0 | 108 | 2 |
| Career total | | | 358 | 17 | 20 | 1 | 19 | 2 | 27 | 2 | 424 | 22 |

== Honours ==
Milton Keynes Dons

- EFL League Two third-place promotion: 2018–19

Lincoln City

- EFL League One: 2025–26

Individual

- Milton Keynes Dons Young Player of the Year: 2018–19
