= Kris Faulds =

Scottish footballer

Personal information
- Full name: Kristopher Faulds
- Date of birth: 3 July 1994 (age 32)
- Place of birth: Scotland
- Height: 1.70 m (5 ft 7 in)
- Position: Midfielder

Senior career*
Years	Team	Apps	(Gls)
2012–2014	Falkirk	14	(1)
2013–2014	→ Stenhousemuir (loan)	9	(0)
2014–2015	Stenhousemuir	33	(2)
2015–2019	East Stirlingshire	32	(4)
- * Club domestic league appearances and goals as of 15:30, 10 January 2016 (UTC)

Kristopher Faulds (born 3 July 1994) is a Scottish professional footballer who last played as a midfielder for Scottish Lowland League side East Stirlingshire.

== Early life ==
He attended Braes High School and graduated in May 2012.

== Career ==
Faulds made his first team debut aged 17, on 25 February 2012, playing the full 90 minutes in Falkirk's 3–0 win over Queen of the South in the Scottish First Division.

On 29 November 2013, Faulds signed on loan for Scottish League One side Stenhousemuir until 31 January 2014. On 4 February 2014, the loan was extended until the end of the season.

In April 2014, Falkirk manager Gary Holt told Faulds that his Falkirk contract was not to be extended, and that he was free to leave and find himself a new club.

After a year with Stenhousemuir, whom he had previously been on loan with, Faulds was released by the "Warriors" and signed for Scottish League Two side East Stirlingshire in June 2015 but left the club in 2019.

== Career statistics ==
As of 4 May 2014

Club statistics
Club	Season	League		Scottish Cup		League Cup		Other		Total	
Club	Season	App	Goals	App	Goals	App	Goals	App	Goals	App	Goals
Falkirk	2011–12	9	0	0	0	0	0	0	0	9	0
Falkirk	2012–13	2	0	0	0	0	0	0	0	2	0
Falkirk	2013–14	3	1	0	0	0	0	0	0	3	1
Falkirk	Total	14	1	0	0	0	0	0	0	14	1
Stenhousemuir (loan)	2013–14	9	0	0	0	0	0	2	0	11	0
Career total		23	1	0	0	0	0	2	0	25	1
