= Liam Dick =

Scottish footballer (born 1995)

Personal information
- Full name: Liam Dick
- Date of birth: 19 August 1995 (age 31)
- Place of birth: Stirling, Scotland
- Height: 1.83 m (6 ft 0 in)
- Position: Full back

Team information
- Current team: Ayr United
- Number: 3

Senior career*
Years	Team	Apps	(Gls)
2011–2016	Falkirk	15	(0)
2015–2016	→ Stranraer (loan)	24	(0)
2016–2018	Stranraer	49	(1)
2018	Dumbarton	13	(0)
2018–2021	Alloa Athletic	76	(1)
2021–2025	Raith Rovers	118	(4)
2025-	Ayr United	40	(1)

International career^{‡}
2013	Scotland U19	1	(0)
- * Club domestic league appearances and goals as of 21:24, 20 November 2026 (UTC) ‡ National team caps and goals as of 08:54, 2 August 2025 (UTC)

Liam Dick (born 19 August 1995) is a Scottish professional footballer who plays for Scottish Championship side Ayr United.

== Career ==
A member of Falkirk's Under 19 team, Dick made his first team debut as a substitute in Falkirk's win over Dundee United on penalties in the Scottish League Cup on 25 October 2011. In the last game of the season, he made his league debut, coming on as a substitute towards the end of the 3–2 win over Ayr United. In January 2013, Dick, along with Ryan McGeever, signed with Falkirk until 2016.

In November 2015, Dick signed a short-term loan deal with Scottish League One side Stranraer. After impressing in his performances for Stranrer, on 4 January 2016, he signed an extension to keep him on loan at Stair Park until the end of the season. In June 2016, Dick signed for Stranraer on a permanent basis.

After two-and-a-half seasons at Stair Park, he agreed to join Scottish Championship side Dumbarton on 1 January 2018. After the Sons relegation to League One, Dick turned down a new deal and left the club in May 2018

Dick then signed for Alloa Athletic in July 2018. In June 2021, he joined Raith Rovers. In May 2023, he signed a new contract until the end of the 2023–24 season, and in June 2024, he extended his contract until 2025.

== Career statistics ==
As of 30 April 2021

Appearances and goals by club, season and competition
Club	Season	League			Scottish Cup		League Cup		Other		Total	
Club	Season	Division	Apps	Goals	Apps	Goals	Apps	Goals	Apps	Goals	Apps	Goals
Falkirk	2011–12	Scottish Championship	1	0	0	0	1	0	0	0	2	0
Falkirk	2012–13	Scottish Championship	3	0	1	0	0	0	1 (Note: Appearances in the Scottish Challenge Cup)	0	5	0
Falkirk	2013–14	Scottish Championship	4	0	0	0	1	0	4 (Note: One appearance in the Scottish Challenge Cup and three in the Premiership play-offs)	0	9	0
Falkirk	2014–15	Scottish Championship	7	0	1	0	3	0	2	0	13	0
Falkirk	Total		15	0	2	0	5	0	7	0	29	0
Stranraer (loan)	2015–16	Scottish League One	24	0	1	0	0	0	4 (Note: Appearances in the Championship play-offs)	1	29	1
Stranraer	2016–17	Scottish League One	34	1	2	0	4	0	2	0	42	1
Stranraer	2017–18	Scottish League One	15	0	1	0	4	0	3	0	23	0
Stranraer	Total		49	1	3	0	8	0	5	0	65	1
Dumbarton	2017–18	Scottish Championship	13	0	0	0	0	0	4	0	17	0
Alloa Athletic	2018–19	Scottish Championship	34	0	2	0	3	0	4	0	43	0
Alloa Athletic	2019–20	Scottish Championship	18	1	2	0	4	0	1	0	25	1
Alloa Athletic	2020–21	Scottish Championship	24	0	1	0	5	0	—		30	0
Alloa Athletic	Total		76	1	5	0	12	0	5	0	98	1
Career total			158	2	8	0	22	0	23	1	209	3

== Honours ==
Raith Rovers

- Scottish Challenge Cup : 2021-22
