= Andy Haworth =

British footballer (born 1988)

Personal information
- Full name: Andrew Alan David Haworth
- Date of birth: 28 November 1988 (age 37)
- Place of birth: Lancaster, England
- Height: 5 ft 8 in (1.73 m)
- Position: Winger

Youth career
- 2004–2008: Blackburn Rovers

Senior career*
Years	Team	Apps	(Gls)
2008–2010	Blackburn Rovers	0	(0)
2009	→ Gateshead (loan)	6	(0)
2010	→ Rochdale (loan)	7	(0)
2010–2012	Bury	45	(3)
2011	→ Oxford United (loan)	4	(0)
2012	→ Bradford City (loan)	3	(0)
2012	Falkirk	12	(0)
2013	Rochdale	7	(0)
2013–2014	Notts County	2	(0)
2013	→ Tamworth (loan)	1	(0)
2014	Tamworth	10	(0)
2014–2015	Cheltenham Town	5	(0)
2015	→ Barrow (loan)	15	(4)
2015–2017	Barrow	52	(3)
2017	Macclesfield Town	2	(0)
2017	Torquay United	6	(0)
2017–2018	Guiseley	7	(0)
2018	Halesowen Town	2	(0)
2018	Glossop North End	2	(0)
2018	Bamber Bridge	5	(1)
2018–2019	Stafford Rangers	23	(3)
2019	Ashton United	1	(0)
2020	Squires Gate	4	(0)
- * Club domestic league appearances and goals as of 13 October 2020 (UTC)

Andrew Alan David Haworth (born 28 November 1988) is an English footballer who plays as a winger.

Haworth progressed through the Blackburn Rovers youth system and made his first team debut in 2008. He had loans with Gateshead in 2009, Rochdale in 2010, Oxford United in 2011 and Bradford City in 2012. After being released, He joined Scottish First Division side Falkirk in July 2012, before leaving in November 2012. He then played for Rochdale, Notts County and Cheltenham Town in the Football League, followed by a series of clubs in non-league.

== Career ==
Born Lancaster, Lancashire, Haworth progressed through the Blackburn Rovers youth system and he made his debut for the academy in the 2004–05 season. His first start for the reserve team came in April 2007 and he scored a goal against Manchester United. However, his appearances during the 2007–08 season were limited due to injuries. He signed a professional contract in the summer of 2008. He made his first team debut for Blackburn after starting in a 2–1 victory at Sunderland in the League Cup on 12 November 2008, being substituted for Roque Santa Cruz on 62 minutes. His next appearance came against Sunderland in the FA Cup fourth round, coming on as a substitute on 56 minutes in a 0–0 draw on 24 January 2009. He finished the 2008–09 season with two appearances.

He joined Conference National team Gateshead on a month's loan on 13 November, making his debut the next day as a substitute in a 5–3 defeat at Stevenage Borough. He finished the loan with six appearances. He signed a new contract to keep him at Blackburn until June 2011 and he subsequently joined League Two team Rochdale on loan for the remainder of the 2009–10 season on 21 January 2010. He made his debut in a 4–1 victory at Cheltenham Town. He finished the loan with seven appearances as Rochdale won promotion to League One. He went on trial with Conference team York City in June with a view to signing on loan for the 2010–11 season. However, he signed for League Two team Bury on a two-year contract on a free transfer on 6 July.

On 12 January 2012 he joined Bradford City on a one-month loan deal lasting until 14 February 2012. He made his debut two days later in a 2–2 draw against Morecambe at Valley Parade. He started the following game playing the full 90 minutes in what was a 1–1 draw at home to Burton Albion. The loan deal expired after a 1–1 draw with Port Vale however it was extended by a further two months until 14 April. His made his first appearance after extending his loan deal as he came off the bench in the 86th minute to replace Craig Fagan during a 1–0 loss away to Dagenham & Redbridge. On 16 April 2012, Haworth loan spell at Bradford City had ended In May 2012, Haworth was released by Bury after being deemed surplus to requirements.

Shortly after leaving Bury, he soon move to Scotland by signing for Falkirk in the first division on a free transfer, with a two-year deal. Despite a good start in friendlies having scored twice, he failed to score later on in his Falkirk career, having been described as 'make the difference-type player' by manager Steven Pressley. On 30 November 2012, Haworth left Falkirk by mutual consent having failed to settle in Scotland. Upon a move to Notts County, Haworth stated his move to Falkirk was a "big mistake".

After his release from Falkirk, Haworth signed for League Two side Rochdale on 24 January after spending two months as a free agent, making newly manager Keith Hill his first signing. He made his debut, the next day, coming on as a substitute for Ashley Grimes in late minutes, as Rochdale settle a draw with Cheltenham Town. However, later in the season, Haworth has his playing time reduce, having spent time on bench or left out the squad selection and at the end of the season, he was released by the club, along with seven other players.

Haworth signed an initial six-month deal with Notts County on 1 July 2013. After the move, Haworth says joining Notts County made him glad. However, it did not and would go on to join Conference National side, Tamworth on loan. After making one appearance, Haworth joined Tanworth on a permanent basis after being released by Notts County.

On 12 April 2014, it was confirmed he hadd left the club.

On 24 June 2014, Haworth joined Cheltenham Town on a one-year deal. On 25 January 2015, he went on loan to Conference North side Barrow, before signing permanently for the club that summer.

After two years with Barrow, Haworth moved to join Macclesfield Town in February 2017. After a short spell with the Silkmen, on 11 August 2017 Haworth signed for Torquay United.

In October 2017, Haworth moved on again, joining fellow National League side Guiseley.

Ahead of the 2018–19 season, Haworth dropped down to the Southern League Premier Central, signing for Halesowen Town, before further spells that season with Northern Premier League sides Glossop North End and Bamber Bridge. He next played for Stafford Rangers, before being released in November 2019.

Following a time with Ashton United, Haworth signed for Squires Gate of the North West Counties Premier Division in September 2020.

== Style of play ==
Haworth plays a winger who primarily operates on the right but can also play on the left. He is an "effective dribbler who can use his pace and trickery to beat players in the final third" and has been described as "pacey and tricky".

== Career statistics ==
As of 1 December 2019

Appearances and goals by club, season and competition
Club	Season	League			National cup		League cup		Other		Total	
Club	Season	Division	Apps	Goals	Apps	Goals	Apps	Goals	Apps	Goals	Apps	Goals
Blackburn Rovers	2008–09	Premier League	0	0	1	0	1	0	—		2	0
Blackburn Rovers	2009–10	Premier League	0	0	0	0	0	0	—		0	0
Blackburn Rovers	Total		0	0	1	0	1	0	0	0	2	0
Gateshead (loan)	2009–10	Conference Premier	6	0	0	0	—		0	0	6	0
Rochdale (loan)	2009–10	League Two	7	0	0	0	0	0	0	0	7	0
Bury	2010–11	League Two	40	3	2	0	1	0	2 (Note: Appearances in the Football League Trophy)	0	45	3
Bury	2011–12	League One	6	0	0	0	0	0	1	0	7	0
Bury	Total		46	3	2	0	1	0	3	0	52	3
Oxford United (loan)	2011–12	League Two	4	0	0	0	0	0	—		4	0
Bradford City (loan)	2011–12	League Two	3	0	0	0	0	0	—		3	0
Falkirk	2012–13	Scottish First Division	12	0	0	0	2	0	2 (Note: Appearances in the Scottish Challenge Cup)	0	16	0
Rochdale	2012–13	League Two	7	0	0	0	0	0	0	0	7	0
Notts County	2013–14	League One	0	0	0	0	0	0	1	0	1	0
Tamworth (loan)	2013–14	Conference Premier	2	0	0	0	—		2 (Note: Appearances in the FA Trophy)	0	4	0
Tamworth	2013–14	Conference Premier	9	0	0	0	—		2	0	11	0
Cheltenham Town	2014–15	League Two	5	0	0	0	1	0	2	0	8	0
Barrow (loan)	2014–15	Conference North	15	4	0	0	—		0	0	15	4
Barrow	2015–16	National League	37	3	1	0	—		1	0	39	3
Barrow	2016–17	National League	15	0	1	0	—		2	0	18	0
Barrow	Total		52	3	2	0	0	0	3	0	57	3
Macclesfield Town	2016–17	National League	2	0	—		—		—		2	0
Torquay United	2017–18	National League	6	0	0	0	—		0	0	6	0
Guiseley	2017–18	National League	7	0	3	1	—		0	0	10	1
Halesowen Town	2018–19	Southern Premier Division Central	2	0	0	0	—		0	0	2	0
Glossop North End	2018–19	NPL Division One West	2	0	0	0	—		0	0	2	0
Bamber Bridge	2018–19	Northern Premier League	5	1	0	0	—		0	0	5	1
Stafford Rangers	2018–19	Northern Premier League	15	3	0	0	—		2 (Note: Appearances in the Staffordshire Senior Cup)	0	17	3
Stafford Rangers	2019–20	Northern Premier League	8	0	1	0	—		1	0	10	0
Stafford Rangers	Total		23	3	1	0	0	0	3	0	27	3
Ashton United	2019–20	Northern Premier League	1	0	0	0	—		0	0	1	0
Squires Gate	2020–21	North West Counties Premier Division	4	0	0	0	—		0	0	4	0
Career total			220	14	9	1	5	0	18	0	252	15
