= 2015–16 Falkirk F.C. season =

Falkirk
2015–16 season
- Chairman: Doug Henderson
- Head coach: Peter Houston
- Stadium: Falkirk Stadium
- Championship: Second place
- Premiership play-off: Runners–Up
- Challenge Cup: Second round
- League Cup: Third round
- Scottish Cup: Fourth round
- Top goalscorer: League: John Baird (17); All: John Baird (19)
- Highest home attendance: 7,804 v Hibernian, Play-off, 13 May 2016
- Lowest home attendance: 881 v East Stirling, League Cup, 31 July 2015
- Average home league attendance: 4,498
Home colours	Away colours

The 2015–16 season was Falkirk's sixth consecutive season in the second tier of Scottish football, having been relegated from the Scottish Premier League at the end of season 2009–10. Falkirk also competed in the Challenge Cup, League Cup and the Scottish Cup.

== Summary ==
=== Season ===
Falkirk finished as runners-up in the Scottish Championship and qualified for the Premiership play-off. Despite taking the lead in the 1st leg, Falkirk were beaten 4–1 by Kilmarnock on aggregate and remained in the Championship for another season.

== Results & fixtures ==
Win Draw Loss Postponed

=== Scottish Championship ===
8 August 2015 Championship	Greenock Morton	1–1	Falkirk	Cappielow
15:00	MacDonald 60'	BBC Report	Watson 19'	Attendance: 2,782; Referee: Muir

15 August 2015 Championship	Falkirk	1–0	Raith Rovers	Falkirk Stadium
15:00	Kerr 80'	BBC Report	Benedictus (yellow card) 71' (red card)	Attendance: 3,753; Referee: Finnie

22 August 2015 Championship	Livingston	1–2	Falkirk	Almondvale Stadium
15:00	Mullen 52'	BBC Report	Leahy 16'; Vaulks 62'	Attendance: 1,211; Referee: Dallas

28 August 2015 Championship	Falkirk	2–1	Dumbarton	Falkirk Stadium
19:45	Alston 5'; Sibbald 14'	BBC Report	Barr 27'	Attendance: 3,600; Referee: Cook

12 September 2015 Championship	St Mirren	2–3	Falkirk	St Mirren Park
15:00	Agnew 3'; Mallan 38'	BBC Report	Leahy 55'; Baird 72' (pen.), 90+2'	Attendance: 3,412; Referee: Beaton

19 September 2015 Championship	Alloa Athletic	1–1	Falkirk	Cappielow
15:00	Marr (red card) 68'; Hamilton 90'	BBC Report	Baird 68' (pen.)	Attendance: 1,572; Referee: Robertson

26 September 2015 Championship	Falkirk	0–0	Queen of the South	Falkirk Stadium
15:00		BBC Report		Attendance: 3,757; Referee: Salmond

3 October 2015 Championship	Rangers	3–1	Falkirk	Ibrox Stadium
15:00	Shiels 3'; Tavernier 81'; Wallace 90+2'	BBC Report	Vaulks 17'	Attendance: 45,135; Referee: McKendrick

17 October 2015 Championship	Falkirk	1–0	Greenock Morton	Falkirk Stadium
15:00	Lee Miller 90+1'	BBC Report		Attendance: 3,946; Referee: Anderson

20 October 2015 Championship	Falkirk	0–1	Hibernian	Falkirk Stadium
19:45		BBC Report	Cummings 40' (pen.)	Attendance: 5,429; Referee: Muir

24 October 2015 Championship	Dumbarton	0–5	Falkirk	Dumbarton Football Stadium
15:00		BBC Report	Baird 5', 23', 48'; McHugh 43'; Alston 71'	Attendance: 963; Referee: Collum

31 October 2015 Championship	Falkirk	3–0	St Mirren	Falkirk Stadium
15:00	Sibbald 18'; Baird 43'; Vaulks 76'	BBC Report		Attendance: 4,239; Referee: Greg Aitken

7 November 2015 Championship	Raith Rovers	1–2	Falkirk	Stark's Park
15:00	Stewart 39'	BBC Report	Alston 42'; Baird 60'	Attendance: 2,160; Referee: Nick Walsh

14 November 2015 Championship	Falkirk	5–0	Alloa Athletic	Falkirk Stadium
15:00	Baird 12', 31', 44'; McHugh 63'; Leahy 81'	BBC Report		Attendance: 3,550; Referee: Clancy

21 November 2015 Championship	Queen of the South	2–2	Falkirk	Palmerston Park
15:00	Lyle 35' (pen.); Russell 84'	BBC Report	Vaulks 17'; Miller 83'	Attendance: 1,728; Referee: McLean

12 December 2015 Championship	Hibernian	1–1	Falkirk	Easter Road
15:00	Boyle 90'	BBC Report	Miller 84'	Attendance: 9,459; Referee: Clancy

19 December 2015 Championship	Falkirk	2–1	Rangers	Falkirk Stadium
12:30	Baird 3' (pen.); Vaulks 55'	BBC Report	McKay 15'	Attendance: 7,488; Referee: Collum

26 December 2015 Championship	Falkirk	1–0	Dumbarton	Falkirk Stadium
15:00	Alston 36'	BBC Report		Attendance: 4,013; Referee: Anderson

29 December 2015 Championship	Falkirk	2–0	Livingston	Falkirk Stadium
19:45	Miller 56', 60'	BBC Report		Attendance: 4,245; Referee: Robertson

2 January 2016 Championship	Alloa Athletic	0–1	Falkirk	Recreation Park
15:00		BBC Report	Baird 15'	Attendance: 1,176; Referee: McKendrick

17 January 2016 Championship	Falkirk	1–1	Hibernian	Falkirk Stadium
15:00	Alston 49'	BBC Report	Cummings 73'	Attendance: 7,081; Referee: Beaton

23 January 2016 Championship	Livingston	1–1	Falkirk	Recreation Park
15:00	Buchanan 51'	BBC Report	Sibbald 44'	Attendance: 1,536; Referee: Almondvale Stadium

30 January 2016 Championship	Rangers	1–0	Falkirk	Ibrox Stadium
15:00	King 90+1'	BBC Report		Attendance: 46,980; Referee: Kevin Clancy

13 February 2016 Championship	Falkirk	2–2	Raith Rovers	Falkirk Stadium
15:00	Alston 14'; McCracken 20'	BBC Report	Craigen 16'; Stewart 68'; Benedictus (yellow card) 83' (red card)	Attendance: 3,956

20 February 2016 Championship	Greenock Morton	0–1	Falkirk	Greenock
		Report	Baird 27'	Stadium: Cappielow Park; Attendance: 1,991; Referee: Craig Thomson

27 February 2016 Championship	Falkirk	3–1	Queen of the South	Falkirk
	Baird 53'; Dowie 65' (o.g.); Alston 85'	Report	Higgins 43'	Stadium: Falkirk Stadium; Attendance: 3,918; Referee: William Collum

1 March 2016 Championship	St Mirren	0–0	Falkirk	Paisley
		Report		Stadium: St Mirren Park; Attendance: 2,321; Referee: Euan Anderson

5 March 2016 Championship	Falkirk	2–0	Alloa Athletic	Falkirk
	Watson 26'; Kerr 36'	Report		Stadium: Falkirk Stadium; Attendance: 3,774; Referee: Steven McLean

12 March 2016 Championship	Dumbarton	1–1	Falkirk	Dumbarton
	Fleming 90+3' (pen.)	Report	Baird 65' (pen.)	Stadium: Dumbarton Football Stadium; Attendance: 734; Referee: Andrew Dallas

18 March 2016 Championship	Falkirk	3–2	Rangers	Falkirk
	Alston 72'; Hippolyte 77'; McHugh 90+2'	Report	Miller 7'; McKay 9'	Stadium: Falkirk Stadium; Attendance: 7,804; Referee: Kevin Clancy

26 March 2016 Championship	Falkirk	1–2	Livingston	Falkirk
	Vaulks 90+1'	Report	White 76'; Stanton 90'; Longridge (red card) 90+3'	Stadium: Falkirk Stadium; Attendance: 3,897; Referee: Nick Walsh

2 April 2016 Championship	Queen of the South	2–2	Falkirk	Dumfries
	Lyle 73'; Russell 90+2'	Report	Alston 45+1'; Baird 52'	Stadium: Palmerston Park; Attendance: 1,530; Referee: Barry Cook

9 April 2016 Championship	Falkirk	3–2	St Mirren	Falkirk
	Miller 9'; McHugh 70'; Alston 90'	Report	Mallan 56', 82'	Stadium: Falkirk Stadium; Attendance: 4,331; Referee: Andrew Dallas

12 April 2016 Championship	Hibernian	2–2	Falkirk	Edinburgh
	Cummings 10', 81' (pen.)	Report	McCracken 87'; McHugh 90'	Stadium: Easter Road; Attendance: 10,277; Referee: Crawford Allan

23 April 2016 Championship	Raith Rovers	2–2	Falkirk	Kirkcaldy
	Thomas 7'; Hardie 70'	Report	Sibbald 56'; McHugh 88'	Stadium: Stark's Park; Attendance: 10,277; Referee: Bobby Madden

1 May 2016 Championship	Falkirk	1–0	Greenock Morton	Falkirk
	Watson 48'	Report		Stadium: Falkirk Stadium; Attendance: 5,271; Referee: Kevin Clancy

=== Premiership play-off ===
10 May 2016 Semi-final 1st Leg	Hibernian	2–2	Falkirk	Edinburgh
	Henderson 57'; McGregor 66'	Report	Miller 34'; McHugh 80'	Stadium: Easter Road; Attendance: 11,830; Referee: Allan Muir

13 May 2016 Semi-final 2nd Leg	Falkirk	3–2 (5–4 agg.)	Hibernian	Falkirk
	Alston 13'; Leahy 79'; McHugh 90+2'	Report	Keatings 31' (pen.), 34'	Stadium: Falkirk Stadium; Attendance: 7,851; Referee: Craig Thomson

19 May 2016 Final 1st Leg	Falkirk	1–0	Kilmarnock	Falkirk
	Vaulks 90+1'	Report		Stadium: Falkirk Stadium; Attendance: 7,636; Referee: John Beaton

22 May 2016 Final 2nd Leg	Kilmarnock	4–0 (4–1 agg.)	Falkirk	Kilmarnock
	Kiltie 3', 62'; Addison 8'; Boyd 65'	Report		Stadium: Rugby Park; Attendance: 11,013; Referee: Willie Collum

=== Scottish Challenge Cup ===
25 July 2015 Challenge Cup round 1	Falkirk	3–1	East Fife	Falkirk Stadium
15:00	Grant 2'; McHugh 90'; Baird 90'	BBC Report	Smith 14'	Attendance: 1,175; Referee: Anderson

18 August 2015 Challenge Cup round 2	Falkirk	3–5	Peterhead	Falkirk Stadium
19:45	Smith 13'; Watson 20'; Cooper 76'	BBC Report	McAllister 22', 27', 43', 81', 87' (pen.)	Attendance: 1,004; Referee: Colvin

=== Scottish League Cup ===
31 July 2015 League Cup round 1	Falkirk	5–0	East Stirling	Falkirk Stadium
	Muirhead 17'; Baird 57'; Vidler 68' (Own goal); McHugh 70'; Alston 78'	BBC Report		Attendance: 881; Referee: Salmond

25 August 2015 League Cup round 2	Partick Thistle	0–1	Falkirk	Firhill Stadium
19:45		BBC Report	Grant 32'	Attendance: 2,221; Referee: Thomson

22 September 2015 League Cup round 3	Ross County	7–0	Falkirk	Victoria Park
19:45	Boyce 30', 35', 40'; De Vita 46'; Franks 54'; Graham 58'; Holden 81'	BBC Report		Attendance: 1,341; Referee: Finnie

=== Scottish Cup ===
28 November 2015 Scottish Cup round 3	Falkirk	4–1	Fraserburgh	Falkirk Stadium
15:00	Miller 16', 74', 84'; Vaulks 70'	BBC Report	Lawrence 67'	Attendance: 1,825; Referee: Newlands

9 January 2016 Scottish Cup round 4	Dundee	P – P	Falkirk	Dens Park
15:00		BBC Report		Referee: Madden
Note: Postponed due to a waterlogged pitch.

12 January 2016 Scottish Cup round 4	Dundee	P – P	Falkirk	Dens Park
19:45		Dundee FC Report
Note: Postponed due to drainage problems.

26 January 2016 Scottish Cup round 4	Dundee	3–1	Falkirk	Dens Park
19:45	Hemmings 39', 60'; Harkins 74'	BBC Sport	Watson 41'	Attendance: 4,279; Referee: Collum

== Player statistics ==
During the 2015–16 season, Falkirk have used twenty-five different players in competitive games. The table below shows the number of appearances and goals scored by each player.

As of 22 May 2016 (UTC)

No.	Pos	Nat	Player	Total		Championship		Other^{[a]}		League Cup		Scottish Cup	
No.	Pos	Nat	Player	Apps	Goals	Apps	Goals	Apps	Goals	Apps	Goals	Apps	Goals
1	GK	(Republic of Ireland) IRL	Danny Rogers	43	0	35+0	0	1+0	0	3+0	0	4+0	0
3	DF	(England) ENG	Luke Leahy	46	4	36+0	3	5+0	1	3+0	0	2+0	0
4	DF	(Scotland) SCO	Aaron Muirhead	41	1	29+2	0	5+0	0	1+2	1	2+0	0
5	DF	(Scotland) SCO	David McCracken	26	2	20+1	2	4+0	0	0+0	0	1+0	0
6	DF	(England) ENG	Will Vaulks	45	7	35+0	6	5+0	0	3+0	0	2+0	1
7	MF	(England) ENG	Tom Taiwo	27	0	15+5	0	4+0	0	2+0	0	1+0	0
8	MF	(Scotland) SCO	Blair Alston	46	12	32+4	10	3+2	1	3+0	1	2+0	0
9	FW	(Scotland) SCO	John Baird	46	19	35+1	17	4+1	1	3+0	1	2+0	0
10	MF	(Scotland) SCO	Craig Sibbald	45	2	34+2	2	4+0	0	3+0	0	2+0	0
11	MF	(Scotland) SCO	Mark Kerr	42	2	34+1	2	4+0	0	2+0	0	1+0	0
12	GK	(Scotland) SCO	Graham Bowman	1	0	0+0	0	1+0	0	0+0	0	0+0	0
14	DF	(Scotland) SCO	Peter Grant	28	2	23+0	0	1+0	1	3+0	1	1+0	0
17	FW	(Scotland) SCO	David Smith	20	1	7+8	0	1+1	1	2+0	0	0+1	0
18	FW	(Scotland) SCO	Lee Miller	35	10	16+13	6	2+2	1	0+1	0	1+0	3
19	FW	(Scotland) SCO	Bob McHugh	30	10	9+13	6	4+1	3	1+1	1	0+1	0
20	MF	(Scotland) SCO	Alex Cooper	2	1	0+0	0	0+1	1	0+1	0	0+0	0
21	GK	(England) ENG	Alex Tokarczyk	1	0	0+0	0	0+0	0	0+0	0	1+0	0
22	MF	(Scotland) SCO	Ryan Blair	9	0	0+7	0	0+0	0	1+0	0	1+0	0
22	MF	(England) ENG	Myles Hippolyte	15	1	4+8	1	0+3	0	0+0	0	0+0	0
23	FW	(Scotland) SCO	Scott Shepherd	6	0	0+4	0	0+1	0	0+1	0	0+0	0
24	DF	(Scotland) SCO	Ryan Sinnamon	4	0	0+3	0	0+0	0	0+0	0	1+0	0
24	MF	(Scotland) SCO	Conor McGrandles	5	0	2+3	0	0+0	0	0+0	0	0+0	0
26	DF	(Scotland) SCO	Kevin McCann	2	0	1+1	0	0+0	0	0+0	0	0+0	0
28	GK	(Turkey) TUR	Deniz Mehmet	1	0	1+0	0	0+0	0	0+0	0	0+0	0
30	FW	(Scotland) SCO	Kevin O'Hara	16	0	3+11	0	0+1	0	0+0	0	0+1	0
33	DF	(Scotland) SCO	Tony Gallacher	1	0	0+0	0	0+0	0	0+0	0	0+1	0
44	DF	(Scotland) SCO	Paul Watson	35	5	25+2	3	4+0	1	3+0	0	1+0	1

a. Includes other competitive competitions, including the play-offs and the Challenge Cup.

=== Disciplinary record ===
As of 22 May 2016 (UTC)

Position	Nation	Number	Name	Championship		Other		League Cup		Scottish Cup		Total	
Position	Nation	Number	Name	Yellow card	Red card	Yellow card	Red card	Yellow card	Red card	Yellow card	Red card	Yellow card	Red card
1	(Republic of Ireland)	GK	Danny Rogers	1	0	0	0	0	0	0	0	1	0
3	(England)	DF	Luke Leahy	6	0	0	0	0	0	0	0	6	0
4	(Scotland)	DF	Aaron Muirhead	7	1	1	0	0	0	0	0	8	1
5	(Scotland)	DF	David McCracken	2	0	1	0	0	0	0	0	3	0
6	(England)	DF	Will Vaulks	5	0	2	0	2	0	0	0	9	0
7	(England)	MF	Tom Taiwo	3	0	2	0	0	0	0	0	5	0
8	(Scotland)	MF	Blair Alston	3	0	0	0	0	0	0	0	3	0
9	(Scotland)	FW	John Baird	4	0	0	0	0	0	0	0	4	0
10	(Scotland)	MF	Craig Sibbald	2	0	0	0	0	0	0	0	2	0
11	(Scotland)	MF	Mark Kerr	7	0	2	0	1	0	0	0	10	0
14	(Scotland)	DF	Peter Grant	2	0	0	0	1	0	0	0	3	0
18	(Scotland)	FW	Lee Miller	2	0	0	0	0	0	0	0	2	0
19	(Scotland)	FW	Bob McHugh	1	0	0	0	0	0	0	0	1	0
22	(England)	MF	Myles Hippolyte	1	0	1	0	0	0	0	0	2	0
24	(Scotland)	DF	Ryan Sinnamon	0	0	0	0	0	0	1	0	1	0
44	(Scotland)	DF	Paul Watson	1	0	1	0	0	0	1	0	3	0
Total				47	1	10	0	4	0	2	0	63	1

== Club statistics ==
=== League table ===
Pos	Team	Pld	W	D	L	GF	GA	GD	Pts	Promotion, qualification or relegation
1	Rangers (C, P)	36	25	6	5	88	34	+54	81	Promotion to the Premiership
2	Falkirk	36	19	13	4	61	34	+27	70	Qualification for the Premiership play-off semi-finals
3	Hibernian	36	21	7	8	59	34	+25	70	Qualification for the Europa League second qualifying round and for the Premiership play-off quarter-finals (Note: Hibernian qualified for the Europa League second qualifying round by winning the 2015–16 Scottish Cup.)
4	Raith Rovers	36	18	8	10	52	46	+6	62	Qualification for the Premiership play-off quarter-finals
5	Greenock Morton	36	11	10	15	39	42	−3	43	

Source: Soccerway
Rules for classification: 1) Points; 2) Goal difference; 3) Number of goals scored
(C) Champions; (P) Promoted

=== Division summary ===
Round	1	2	3	4	5	6	7	8	9	10	11	12	13	14	15	16	17	18	19	20	21	22	23	24	25	26	27	28	29	30	31	32	33	34	35	36
Ground	A	H	A	H	A	A	H	A	H	H	A	H	A	H	A	A	H	H	H	A	H	A	A	A	A	H	A	H	A	H	H	A	H	A	A	H
Result	D	W	W	W	W	D	D	L	W	L	W	W	W	W	D	D	W	W	W	W	D	D	L	D	W	W	D	W	D	W	L	D	W	D	D	W
Position	5	3	2	1	2	2	2	4	4	4	3	3	3	3	3	3	3	3	2	2	2	3	3	3	3	3	3	3	3	2	3	3	2	2	2	2

Updated to match(es) played on 1 May 2016. Source:
A = Away; H = Home; W = Win; D = Draw; L = Loss

=== Management statistics ===
Last updated on 22 May 2016

Name	From	To	P	W	D	L	Win% (Note: Win% is the percentage of matches won rounded to two decimal places.)
Peter Houston	25 July 2015	Present	36	19	13	4	52.78

== Transfers ==
=== Players in ===
Player	From	Fee
(Republic of Ireland) Danny Rogers	(Scotland) Aberdeen	Loan
(Scotland) Bob McHugh	(Scotland) Motherwell	Free
(Scotland) Paul Watson	(Scotland) Raith Rovers	Free
(Scotland) Ryan Sinnamon	(Scotland) Rangers	Loan
(Scotland) Lee Miller	(Scotland) Kilmarnock	Free
(England) Alex Tokarczyk	(England) Aylesbury United	Free
(Scotland) Conor McGrandles	(England) Norwich City	Loan
(England) Nathan Austin	(Scotland) East Fife	Undisclosed
(Scotland) Kevin McCann	(Singapore) Warriors	Free
(England) Myles Hippolyte	(Scotland) Livingston	Undisclosed
(Turkey) Deniz Mehmet	(Turkey) Kayserispor	Free

=== Players out ===
Player	To	Fee
(Scotland) Ryan McGeever	(Scotland) Queen's Park	Free
(Scotland) Rory Loy	(Scotland) Dundee	Free
(Scotland) Jamie MacDonald	(Scotland) Kilmarnock	Free
(Nigeria) Olumide Durojaiye	(England) Enfield Town	Free
(Scotland) Robbie McNab	Unattached	Free
(Scotland) Liam Rowan	Unattached	Free
(Scotland) Gregor Amos	(Scotland) Edinburgh City	Free
(Scotland) Botti Biabi	(Wales) Swansea City	Undisclosed
(England) Nathan Austin	(Scotland) East Fife	Loan
(Scotland) Ryan Blair	(Wales) Swansea City	Undisclosed
(Scotland) Kieran Duffie	Unattached	Free

== See also ==
- List of Falkirk F.C. seasons
