= Stewart Murdoch =

Scottish footballer

Personal information
- Full name: Stewart Murdoch
- Date of birth: 9 May 1990 (age 36)
- Place of birth: Aberdeen, Scotland
- Positions: Midfielder; defender

Youth career
- Syngenta
- –2007: Falkirk

Senior career*
Years	Team	Apps	(Gls)
2007–2013	Falkirk	71	(6)
2008	→ Berwick Rangers (loan)	4	(0)
2010	→ East Fife (loan)	14	(1)
2010	→ East Fife (loan)	10	(0)
2013–2015	Fleetwood Town	49	(0)
2014	→ Northampton Town (loan)	8	(1)
2015–2016	Ross County	29	(2)
2016–2019	Dundee United	59	(0)
2019	→ East Fife (loan)	5	(0)
2019–2025	East Fife	105	(4)
2025	Stirling Albion	4	(0)
- * Club domestic league appearances and goals as of 25 February 2024

Stewart Murdoch (born 9 May 1990) is a Scottish professional footballer playing as a midfielder or defender who is a free agent. Murdoch came through the youth academy at Falkirk, and over a six-year period played 88 games in all competitions for The Bairns, in which the majority of these came in the Scottish First Division. He also spent time on loan in the Scottish Second Division playing for Berwick Rangers in season 2007–08 and for East Fife in seasons 2009–10 and 2010–11.

Murdoch played for Fleetwood Town in English Football League One and English Football League Two from 2013 until 2015. He also spent time on loan in the English League Two playing for Northampton Town in season 2014–15. Murdoch then played for Ross County in the Scottish Premiership in season 2015–16, before moving to Dundee United. In season 2018–19, Murdoch returned on loan to East Fife before signing a permanent deal the following season.

== Club career ==
=== Falkirk ===
Born in Aberdeen, Scotland, Murdoch joined Falkirk when he was six years old and came through the youth academy. Murdoch remained there until 2007, when he signed his first professional contract and was included in the club's first team photo for the 2007–08 season. On 31 January 2009, Murdoch appeared in Falkirk’s first team as an unused substitute, in a 1–0 win against Aberdeen.

Ahead of the 2009–10 season, Murdoch signed a one-year contract with the club. Murdoch made his Falkirk first team debut on 8 November 2009, in a 3–3 home draw against Celtic, coming on as an 87th-minute substitute for Ryan Flynn. He made two further substitute appearances before going out on loan.

==== Loan spells from Falkirk ====
In January 2008, Murdoch joined Berwick Rangers on a month-long loan. He made his debut for the club, starting the whole game, in a 4–0 loss to Ayr United on 2 January 2008. Murdoch made four appearances scoring no goals during this loan period.

In February 2010, Murdoch joined East Fife on loan until the end of the 2009–10 season. He made his first team debut for the club, in a 1–1 draw away at Stenhousemuir on 27 February 2010. On 16 March 2010, Murdoch scored his only goal for East Fife, in a 3–1 victory over Arbroath. He went on to make fourteen appearances in all competitions at the end of the 2009–10 season.

Murdoch was sent on loan to East Fife again at the start of the 2010–11 season. He made his second debut for the club, in a 4–3 win against Brechin City in the first round of the Scottish Challenge Cup. Murdoch was featured in every matches for East Fife until he was suspended on two occasions, including a red card for a second bookable offence against Dumbarton on 30 October 2010. By the time Murdoch left East Fife in January 2011, he played ten times and scored no goals in all competitions.

=== Return to Falkirk ===
Murdoch returned to Falkirk and made his first start for them in a 1–0 away defeat against Partick Thistle in a Scottish Cup fourth round replay on 18 January 2011. After the match, he said: "I was pleased with my performance. I told the manager before the game that I'd been waiting a long time for this chance to start, and I was going to take it. He was pleased with that and I hope I can keep my place now." Since returning from a loan spell at the club, he became a first team regular, playing in the midfield position. Murdoch scored his first goal for the club in the home 2–0 victory against Cowdenbeath on 26 February 2011. For his performance, he signed a two–year contract with Falkirk, keeping him until 2013. Murdoch set up a goal on 19 April 2011 and 23 April 2011 against Partick Thistle and Stirling Albion respectively. At the end of the 2010–11 season, he made fourteen appearances and scoring once in all competitions.

At the start of the 2011–12 season, Murdoch set up a goal for Farid El Alagui to score the opening goal of the game, in a 2–1 win against Partick Thistle on 13 August 2011. In a match against Livingston on 10 September 2011, however, he was shown the first red card of his career in a 1–1 draw. After the match, the club decided not to appeal his sending off and was suspended for two matches. On 24 September 2011, Murdoch returned to the starting line–up from suspension, in a 3–2 loss against Greenock Morton. Since returning from suspension, he regained his place in the first team, playing in the midfield position. On 25 October 2011, Murdoch scored the winning penalty in a 5–4 shootout victory after a 2–2 draw in the quarterfinals of the League Cup away at Dundee United to help Falkirk advanced to the next round. In a match against Queen of the South on 19 December 2011, however, he suffered a knee injury and was substituted in the 39th minute. After missing two matches, Murdoch returned from injury, starting the whole game, in a 2–0 win against East Fife in the fourth round of the Scottish Cup on 7 January 2012. In a match against Greenock Morton on 20 March 2012, he suffered a foot injury and was substituted at half-time, as the club loss 2–0. After the match, Murdoch was out for the rest of the 2011–12 season. Due to his injury, Manager Steven Pressley said Murdoch's injury is "disappointing" with his season over and said that he has been a terrific influence on the squad. Nevertheless, Murdoch was then part of the Falkirk squad that won the 2011–12 Scottish Challenge Cup, as the club won 1–0 against Hamilton on 1 April 2012. At the end of the 2011–12 season, he made thirty–six appearances in all competitions. During the season, Pressley praised Murdoch for his good displays and nicknamed him "Lazarus".

At the start of the 2012–13 season, Murdoch continued to remain in Falkirk’s first team, playing in the midfield position. On 2 September 2012, he was then chosen to be the club’s penalty taker, scoring the opener in the 2–1 defeat to Livingston. Three weeks later on 22 September 2012, Murdoch scored his second goal of the season, scoring from a penalty spot, in the 1–1 draw with Airdrie United. On 15 December 2012, he scored his third goal of the season, from a penalty, in a 2–0 win against Cowdenbeath. Murdoch scored on 26 January 2013 and 2 February 2013 against Airdrie United and Forfar Athletic respectively. On 5 March 2013, he scored a 90th-minute header to secure Falkirk a 1–1 league draw against Raith Rovers. At the end of the 2012–13 season, Murdoch made forty appearances and scoring six times in all competitions. For his performances, he was awarded the Falkirk Herald Starshot prize.

Following this, Murdoch was offered a new deal by Falkirk, but he turned down the chance to stay in Scotland, moving instead to English outfit Fleetwood Town.

=== Fleetwood Town ===
On 14 June 2013, Fleetwood Town confirmed the signing of Murdoch on a two-year deal. Upon joining the club, he said his aim was to win a first team place.

Murdoch made his Fleetwood Town’s debut, coming on as a 70th-minute substitute for Steven Schumacher, in a 3–1 against Dagenham & Redbridge in the opening game of the season. Since joining the club, he became a first team regular, playing in the midfield position. Murdoch also faced competitions in the midfield position along the way. Towards the end of the 2013–14 season, he continued to alternate between the starting line–up and substitute bench. This also includes when on 26 May 2014, Murdoch came on as an 86th-minute substitute for Iain Hume in the League Two playoffs final, defeating Burton Albion 1–0 at Wembley Stadium that saw Fleetwood Town promoted to League One in his first season with the club. In his first season at Fleetwood, Murdoch made forty-seven appearances for the club in all competitions.

Murdoch's second season at Fleetwood Town was not as good as his first season with his first team opportunities limited mostly to appearances on the substitutes bench. Following his loan spell at Northampton Town came to an end, he returned to the first team at the club and continued to find his playing time, coming from the substitute bench. Murdoch made his first appearance for Fleetwood Town since returning from his loan spell with Northampton Town on 10 February 2015, in a 1–0 win over Barnsley He later made nine more appearances for the club, making five starts along the way. At the end of the 2014–15 season, Murdoch made thirteen appearances in all competitions. On 6 May 2015, he was released by Fleetwood Town and made 61 appearances in all competitions and scoring no goals upon departing the club.

==== Northampton Town (loan) ====
Murdoch joined Northampton Town on loan on 30 October 2014, with the loan due to end on 3 January 2015.

He made his debut for the club, starting the whole game, in a 2–0 victory over AFC Wimbledon on 1 November 2014. On 22 November 2014, Murdoch then set up a goal for Marc Richards to score the only goal of the game against Stevenage to end Northampton Town’s winless streak. On 13 December 2014, he scored his first goal in English football and his only goal in 8 appearances for Northampton in a 3–2 defeat against Plymouth Argyle. By January, Murdoch's loan spell with Northampton came to an end and he returned to his parent club.

=== Ross County ===
On 17 June 2015, Ross County confirmed the signing of Murdoch on a two-year deal, marking his return to Scotland. Upon joining the club, he said about his determination to prove himself in Scotland’s top-flight football.

He made his Ross County debut, starting a match and played 56 minutes before being substituted, in a 2–0 defeat against Celtic on 1 August 2015. After being dropped from the starting eleven for the next three matches, Murdoch returned to the first team, coming on as a 62nd-minute substitute, in a 4–0 win against Kilmarnock on 22 August 2015. In the last 16 of the Scottish League Cup against Falkirk, he set up two goals against his former club, in a 2–0 win to help Ross County advance to the next round. Following his return to the first team, Murdoch alternated between the starting line–up and substitute bench at the club. On 12 December 2015, he scored his first Ross County goal, in a 3–1 win against Hamilton Academical on 12 December 2015.

By December, however, Murdoch found his playing time, coming from the substitute bench. Murdoch won the Scottish League Cup with Ross County who defeated Hibernian in the final 2–1 on 13 March 2016, coming on as a 79th-minute substitute for Ian McShane. On 24 April 2016, he scored his second Ross County goal scoring the equaliser in a 1–1 draw with Celtic. At the end of the 2015–16 season, he made 34 appearances and scored 2 goals in all competitions.

Murdoch was released by Ross County on 13 June 2016.

=== Dundee United ===
On 14 June 2016, Murdoch signed for Scottish Championship club Dundee United on an initial one-year deal. It came after the Tangerines were interested in signing him.

Murdoch made his Dundee United debut in the Scottish League Cup group stage match against Arbroath and started the whole game to help the club win 5–3 in a penalty shootout following a 1–1 draw. He scored his first goal for Dundee United on 23 July 2016 in a 1–1 draw against Inverness Caledonian Thistle in the group stage of the 2016-17 Scottish League Cup, where the Tangerines won 4–1 in a penalty shootout. Murdoch started a number of matches, playing in the defensive midfield position at the start of the 2016–17 season. After missing three matches due to a calf injury, he returned to the starting line–up, in a 2–1 loss against Greenock Morton on 20 September 2016 in the quarter–finals of the Scottish League Cup. However, his return was short–lived when Murdoch suffered a slight tear of his cruciate ligament and was out for three months. On 12 November 2016, he returned from injury, coming on as a 87th-minute substitute, in a 1–0 win against Dunfermline Athletic in the quarterfinals of the Scottish Challenge Cup. But Murdoch’s return was short–lived when he was sat out throughout November, due to fitness concerns. On 2 December 2016, Murdoch made his first appearance in three weeks, coming on as a 82nd-minute substitute, in a 1–0 win against Hibernian. Following his return, he alternated between the starting line–up and substitute bench. Murdoch expressed optimism that Dundee United can be title contender in the Scottish Championship. He started in the right–back position in the Scottish Challenge Cup final, as Dundee United won 2–1 against St Mirren to win the tournament. Following this, Murdoch began playing in the right–back position for the rest of the 2016–17 season despite facing injury along the way. He played three times in the Scottish Premiership play–offs, beating Greenock Morton in both legs and Falkirk in the first leg. During the match against Falkirk, however, Murdoch suffered a groin injury that saw him out for the reminder of the play–offs campaign. His absence eventually saw the club lose 1–0 on aggregate in the final against Hamilton Academical, failing to win back promotion to the Scottish Premiership. At the end of the 2016–17 season, he made thirty appearances and scoring once in all competitions. On 21 June 2017, Murdoch signed a new two-year contract with Dundee United.

The start of the 2017–18 season saw Murdoch continuing to recover from a groin injury. On 9 August 2017, he made his return from injury, coming on as a 85th-minute substitute, in a 2–1 loss against Dundee in the last 16 of the Scottish League Cup. Following his return from injury, Murdoch regained his first team place, playing in the right–back position. In a match against Dumbarton on 9 September 2017, however, he was at fault when his mistake led to the opposition team scoring a goal, in a 1–1 draw. This led him to be dropped from the squad temporarily. On 7 October 2017, Murdoch returned to the starting line–up and was captain for the first time in his Dundee United’s career when he led the club beating Linfield 1–0 in the last 16 of the Scottish Challenge Cup. Murdoch soon regained his first team place, playing in the right–back position. However, he suffered an injury while training and was out for a month. On 20 January 2018, Murdoch returned from injury, coming on as a 83rd-minute substitute, in a 2–0 win against Alloa Athletic in the fourth round of the Scottish Cup. Following his return from injury, he regained his first team place, playing in right–back position, centre–back position and left–back position towards the end of the 2017–18 season. On the last game of the season, Murdoch captained Dundee United for the second time, in a 3–2 win against Livingston. After helping the club qualify for the Premiership play–offs, he played in both legs of the quarter–finals play–offs against Dunfermline Athletic and helped Dundee United advance to the semi–finals after the club won 2–1 on aggregate. Murdoch played in both legs of the semi–finals Premiership play–offs against Livingston, as Dundee United loss 4–2 on aggregate, resulting in the club failing to win promotion back to the Scottish Premiership for the second time. At the end of the 2017–18 season, he made thirty–six appearances in all competitions.

Ahead of the 2018–19 season, Murdoch was told by manager Csaba László that he’s still part of his plans for Dundee United’s first team. matches, in which he converted successfully and unsuccessfully against Arbroath and Alloa Athletic respectively, as the club lost in both matches. Shortly after, Murdoch suffered a knee injury that saw him out for three matches. On 25 August 2018, he returned to the starting line–up as a right–back position, in a 3–1 win against Partick Thistle. However, Murdoch’s return was short–lived when he suffered a knee problem while training and missed three matches. On 29 September 2018, Murdoch returned to the first team, coming on as a 56th-minute substitute, only for him to be sent–off three minutes later for a foul on Jamie Lindsay, in a 5–1 loss against Ross County. After serving a two match suspension, he returned to the starting line–up as a right–back position, in a 1–1 draw against Inverness Caledonian Thistle on 20 October 2018. Following his return from suspension, Murdoch regained his first team place, playing in the right–back position. However, during a match against Dunfermline Athletic on 12 January 2019, he suffered a knee injury and was substituted in the 73rd minute, as Dundee United won 1–0, in what turns out to be his last appearance for the club. By the time Murdoch was loaned out to East Fife, he made seventeen appearances in all competitions at Dundee United. Following his loan spells at East Fife came to an end, Murdoch was released by the club at the end of the 2018–19 season.

==== East Fife (loan) ====
On 25 February 2019, Murdoch joined East Fife on loan until the end of the 2018–19 season. He explained joining the club, saying: "The next few weeks, it's just a case of play and recover and that's what everybody wants to do; play games. I've missed six or seven weeks through injury, so the best thing for me was to go to East Fife and play as many games as possible. That was a reason why it was a draw, a chance to play as many games as possible and hopefully more games at the end of the season in May. There's an opportunity to play Tuesday and Saturday and get my fitness. I could have stayed at Dundee United and got a run out every so often but now I'm 28 I want to be playing football. Hopefully I can be involved in as many games as possible."

He made his debut for East Fife, starting the whole game in the centre–back position, in a 1–1 draw against Arbroath on 26 February 2019. However, in his second appearance for the club, Murdoch suffered an injury and was substituted in the 18th minute, in a 3–0 loss against Forfar Athletic on 2 March 2019. After the match, he was out for a month. On 20 April 2019, Murdoch made his return from injury, starting the whole game, in a 3–0 loss against Dumbarton. At the end of the 2018–19 season, he made five appearances in all competitions. Following this, Murdoch returned to his parent club.

=== East Fife ===
On 28 May 2019, Murdoch signed a permanent deal with East Fife.

His first game after signing for the club on a permanent basis came on 13 July 2019, starting the whole game, in a 2–0 loss against Cowdenbeath in the group stage of the Scottish League Cup. Since joining East Fife, he rotated in playing either the centre–back position and right–back position. On 20 September 2019, Murdoch scored his first goal for the club, in a 2–2 draw against Dumbarton. On 1 February 2020, he scored his second goal for East Fife, in a 4–2 win against Dumbarton. Murdoch remained in the first team until the season was soon curtailed because of the COVID-19 pandemic, with the club only received 45 points. At the end of the 2019–20 season, he made thirty–four appearances and scoring two goals in all competitions.

At the start of the 2020–21 season, Murdoch continued to remain in the first team regular, playing in the right–back position. He once played in the centre–back position, coming against Peterhead on 12 December 2020. Murdoch was involved in every matches in the 2020–21 season until he missed one match against Clyde on 1 April 2021. On 6 April 2021, Murdoch returned to the starting line–up, in a 2–2 draw against Partick Thistle. After missing two matches, he returned to the first team, coming on as a 65th-minute substitute, in a 3–1 win against Peterhead on 29 April 2021. In a follow–up match against Forfar Athletic, Murdoch scored his first goal of the season, in a 3–2 win. At the end of the 2020–21 season, he went on to make twenty–two appearances and scoring once in all competitions. Following this, Murdoch signed a contract extension with East Fife, keeping him until 2023.

At the start of the 2021–22 season, however, Murdoch suffered an injury and was substituted in the 37th minute, in a 3–0 loss against Kelty Hearts in the group stage of the Scottish League Cup. After the match, he was out for a month. On 28 August 2021, Murdoch made his return from injury, starting a match and played 50 minutes, only for him to be substituted after suffering an injury, in a 3–0 win against Peterhead. After missing one match, he returned from injury, starting a match and played 69 minutes before being substituted, in a 3–0 loss against Airdrieonians on 18 September 2021. During the match, however, Murdoch suffered a hamstring injury and was out for a month. On 13 November 2021, he returned from injury, starting the whole game, in a 1–0 loss against Airdrieonians. However, his return was short–lived when he suffered an injury and was out for two months. On 12 February 2022, Murdoch returned to the first team from injury, coming on as a 70th-minute substitute, in a 3–1 win against Alloa Athletic. On 12 March 2022, he captained East Fife for the first time against Dumbarton, only for him to be substituted in the 40th minute after suffering an injury, as the club won 2–0. After missing one match, Murdoch returned to the starting line–up from injury, playing the whole game, in a 3–0 loss against Alloa Athletic on 26 March 2022. During a match against Falkirk on 16 April 2022, he started the match and played 76 minutes before being substituted, as East Fife loss 3–1, resulting in their relegation to Scottish League Two. After the match, it was revealed that Murdoch suffered an injury and was out for the rest of the 2021–22 season. At the end of the 2021–22 season, he went on to make seventeen appearances in all competitions.

At the start of the 2022–23 season, Murdoch recovered from injury and was appointed as the new captain of East Fife. In the group stage match of the Scottish League Cup against Alloa Athletic, he was one of the two players that missed the penalty in a shootout that saw the club loss 6–5 following a 1–1 draw. After missing one match, Murdoch returned to the starting line–up, in a 7–0 loss against Ross County in the group stage match of the Scottish League Cup. After missing another one match due to work commitments, he returned to the starting line–up as captain, in a 2–2 draw against Stranraer on 27 August 2022. In the second round match of the Scottish Cup against Stenhousemuir, Murdoch suffered an injury and was substituted in the 10th minute, as East Fife loss 2–1. On 19 November 2022, he returned to the starting line–up from injury as captain, in a 3–1 loss against Stirling Albion. On 7 January 2023, Murdoch scored his first goal of the season when he "found himself with a bit of space 25-yards out and his sensational shot managed to find the top left corner", in a 2–1 win against Elgin City. In a match against Stranraer on 23 January 2023, however, he suffered a calf injury and was substituted in the 79th minute, as the club loss 3–1 and was out for a month. On 18 March 2023, Murdoch returned to the starting line–up from injury as captain, in a 1–1 draw against Bonnyrigg Rose. Despite this, he became a first team regular as captain for the rest of the 2022–23 season, playing in right–back position, left–back position and centre–back position. At the end of the 2022–23 season, Murdoch made thirty–one appearances and scoring once in all competitions. Following this, he signed a one–year contract extension with East Fife.

Murdoch made his first appearance of the 2023–24 season, coming on as a 81st-minute substitute, against Queen of the South as East Fife won 5–3 in a penalty shootout following a 0–0 draw in the group stage match of the Scottish League Cup. He continued to regain his first team place, playing in the left–back position in the first six league matches. In a match against Clyde on 16 September 2023, however, Murdoch suffered a calf injury and was substituted in the 26th minute, as the club won 2–0. After the match, he was out for a month. Murdoch made his return from injury, coming on as a second–half substitute, in a 1–0 loss against Dunbar United in the second round of the Scottish Cup. Following his return from injury, he regained his first team place as captain, playing in right–back position, left–back position and centre–back position. However, prior to the match against Elgin City on 3 February 2024, Murdoch suffered an injury in the warmup and missed two matches. On 17 February 2024, he returned to the starting line–up from injury, as captain, in a 2–0 win against Bonnyrigg Rose. Since returning from injury, Murdoch started in the next seven matches, playing in the right–back position. However, during a match against Stenhousemuir on 6 April 2024, he suffered an injury and was substituted at half-time, as the match ended in a 0–0 draw. After missing one match, Murdoch returned to the starting line–up as captain, in a 0–0 draw against Forfar Athletic on 20 April 2024. At the end of the 2023–24 season, he made thirty–four appearances in all competitions. Following this, Murdoch signed a contract extension with East Fife.

At the start of the 2024–25 season, Murdoch continued to remain in the first team as captain, playing in the right–back position, though his playing time was soon reduced. During the match against Clyde on 31 August 2024, however, he suffered an injury and was substituted in the 23rd minute, as East Fife won 5–1. After missing one match, Murdoch scored on his return from injury, in a 2–0 win against Peterhead on 21 September 2024. In a follow–up match against The Spartans, however, his return was short–lived when he suffered an injury and was substituted in the 8th minute, as the club won 1–0. After missing two matches, Murdoch returned to the starting line–up from injury as captain, in a 1–0 loss against Banks o' Dee on 26 October 2024. After missing two matches by the end of the year due to injury, he returned to the starting line–up from injury as captain, in a 1–0 win against Forfar Athletic on 4 January 2025. He started in the next matches, playing in the right–back position following his return from injury. However, Murdoch, once again, suffered an injury and did not play for a month. On 8 March 2025, he made his return to the starting line–up from injury as captain, in a 2–1 win against Clyde. However, towards the end of the 2024–25 season, Murdoch suffered an injury that saw him out of East Fife’s play-offs campaign. In the return leg of the Scottish League One play-offs against Annan Athletic, he came on as a 73rd-minute substitute and played the rest of the game to help East Fife drew 1–1, a result that saw the club promoted to the Scottish League One. At the end of the 2024–24 season, Murdoch made thirty appearances and scoring once in all competitions. On 3 June 2025, East Fife announced that he would be released by the club.

=== Stirling Albion ===
On 1 June 2025, Murdoch joined Stirling Albion on a free transfer.

He made his debut for the club, starting a match and played 61 minutes before being substituted, in a 3–1 win against Hibernian B team in the group stage of the Scottish Challenge Cup. However, in a match against Inverness Caledonian Thistle in the group stage of the Scottish League Cup, Murdoch received a straight red card in the 76th minute for a foul on a unprofessional foul, in a 2–1 loss. On 31 October 2025, he left Stirling Albion due to increased work commitments. By the time Murdoch left the club, he made six appearances in all competitions.

== Personal life ==
Murdoch is training to become a police officer in preparation for a new career once his playing career finishes.

== Career statistics ==
As of match played 9 January 2021

Appearances and goals by club, season and competition
Club	Season	League			National Cup		League Cup		Other		Total	
Club	Season	Division	Apps	Goals	Apps	Goals	Apps	Goals	Apps	Goals	Apps	Goals
Falkirk	2007–08	Scottish Premier League	0	0	0	0	0	0	0	0	0	0
Falkirk	2008–09	Scottish Premier League	0	0	0	0	0	0	0	0	0	0
Falkirk	2009–10	Scottish Premier League	3	0	0	0	0	0	0	0	3	0
Falkirk	2010–11	Scottish First Division	13	1	1	0	0	0	0	0	14	1
Falkirk	2011–12	Scottish First Division	26	0	2	0	4	0	4 (Note: Appearances in the Scottish Challenge Cup)	0	36	0
Falkirk	2012–13	Scottish First Division	32	5	4	1	2	0	2	0	40	6
Falkirk	Total		74	6	7	1	6	0	6	0	93	7
Berwick Rangers (loan)	2007–08	Scottish Second Division	4	0	0	0	0	0	0	0	4	0
East Fife (loan)	2009–10	Scottish Second Division	14	1	0	0	0	0	0	0	14	1
East Fife (loan)	2010–11	Scottish Second Division	10	0	0	0	1	0	3 (Note: Includes 1 Challenge Cup match not recorded on Soccerbase or Soccerway. "East Fife 4–3 Brechin City (aet)". BBC Sport. 24 July 2010.)	0	14	0
Fleetwood Town	2013–14	Football League Two	38	0	3	0	1	0	6 (Note: Four appearances in the Football League Trophy and two in the League Two play-offs)	0	48	0
Fleetwood Town	2014–15	Football League One	11	0	0	0	1	0	1 (Note: Appearance in the Football League Trophy)	0	13	0
Fleetwood Town	Total		49	0	3	0	2	0	7	0	61	0
Northampton Town (loan)	2014–15	Football League Two	8	1	2	0	0	0	0	0	10	1
Ross County	2015–16	Scottish Premiership	29	2	1	0	4	0	0	0	34	2
Dundee United	2016–17	Scottish Championship	18	0	1	0	6	1	5 (Note: Two appearances in the Scottish Challenge Cup and three in the Premiership play-offs)	0	30	1
Dundee United	2017–18	Scottish Championship	27	0	2	0	1	0	6	0	36	0
Dundee United	2018–19	Scottish Championship	14	0	0	0	3	0	0	0	17	0
Dundee United	Total		59	0	3	0	10	1	11	0	83	1
East Fife (loan)	2018–19	Scottish League One	5	0	0	0	0	0	0	0	5	0
East Fife	2019–20	Scottish League One	28	2	1	0	5	0	0	0	34	0
East Fife	2020-21	Scottish League One	9	0	1	0	3	0	0	0	13	0
East Fife	Total		37	2	2	0	8	0	0	0	47	2
Career total			289	12	18	1	31	1	27	0	369	12

== Honours ==
Falkirk

- Scottish Challenge Cup: 2011–12

Fleetwood Town

- Football League Two play-offs: 2014

Ross County

- Scottish League Cup: 2015–16

Dundee United

- Scottish Challenge Cup: 2016-17

East Fife

- Scottish League One play-offs 2024-25
