= Kyle Turnbull =

Scottish footballer

Personal information
- Date of birth: 22 January 1995 (age 31)
- Place of birth: Livingston, Scotland
- Position: Left back

Team information
- Current team: Bo'ness United
- Number: 18

Senior career*
Years	Team	Apps	(Gls)
2011–2014	Falkirk	4	(0)
2014–2017	Albion Rovers	84	(5)
2017–2019	Linlithgow Rose		
2019–2020	Sauchie Juniors		
2020–2023	Bo'ness United		
2023-	Dunipace		
- * Club domestic league appearances and goals as of 19:30, 4 November 2020 (UTC)

Kyle Turnbull (born 22 January 1995) is a Scottish professional footballer who plays as a left back for Dunipace.

== Career ==
Turnbull made his senior debut for Falkirk against Clyde early in the 2013–14 season.

He signed for Albion Rovers in July 2014. After three years with the club, Turnbull moved to SJFA East Superleague club Linlithgow Rose for the 2017–18 season.

Turnbull moved to Sauchie Juniors in July 2019.

He would later sign for Bo'ness United in February 2020.

In 2023, Turnbull joined East of Scotland First Division side Dunipace.
