= 2010–11 Falkirk F.C. season =

Falkirk
2010–11 season
- Chairman: Martin Ritchie
- Manager: Steven Pressley
- Stadium: Falkirk Stadium
- Scottish First Division: Third place
- Challenge Cup: First round, lost to Stirling Albion
- League Cup: Quarter-final, lost to Aberdeen
- Scottish Cup: Fourth round, lost to Partick Thistle
- Top goalscorer: League: Mark Stewart (15); All: Mark Stewart (17)
- Highest home attendance: 6,947 vs. Dunfermline Athletic, 7 August 2010
- Lowest home attendance: 3,376 vs. Queen of the South, 15 January 2011
- Average home league attendance: 4,224
Home colours	Away colours

The 2010–11 season was Falkirk's first season back in the Scottish First Division, having been relegated from the Scottish Premier League at the end of season 2009–10. Falkirk also competed in the Challenge Cup, League Cup and the Scottish Cup.

== Summary ==
Falkirk finished third in their first season back in the First Division. They also reached the quarter-final of the League Cup, the fourth round of the Scottish Cup, and the first round of the Challenge Cup.

== Results ==
Win Draw Loss

=== Scottish First Division ===
7 August 2010 First Division	Falkirk	0–1	Dunfermline	Falkirk Stadium
	Millar (red card) 90'	BBC Report	Clarke 16'	Attendance: 6,947; Referee: Murray

14 August 2010 First Division	Ross County	0–1	Falkirk	Victoria Park
		BBC Report	Flynn 36'	Attendance: 2,837; Referee: Brines

21 August 2010 First Division	Falkirk	3–0	Stirling Albion	Falkirk Stadium
	Twaddle 60'; Stewart 70'; Compton 79'	BBC Report		Attendance: 4,196; Referee: McDonald

28 August 2010 First Division	Dundee	2–0	Falkirk	Dens Park
	O'Donnell 43'; Riley 45+3'; Douglas (red card)	BBC Report		Attendance: 4,557; Referee: Collum

11 September 2010 First Division	Falkirk	3–1	Queen of the South	Falkirk Stadium
	McManus 15', 71'; Deuchar 84'	BBC Report	Burns 66'; Harris (red card)	Attendance: 4,064; Referee: McKendrick

18 September 2010 First Division	Falkirk	2–1	Morton	Falkirk Stadium
	Smyth 45+2'; Flynn 84'	BBC Report	Kean 79'	Attendance: 3,988; Referee: Tumilty

25 September 2010 First Division	Raith Rovers	2–1	Falkirk	Stark's Park
	Tadé 37'; Dyer 78'	BBC Report	Flynn 7'	Attendance: 3,438; Referee: Conroy

2 October 2010 First Division	Falkirk	5–1	Cowdenbeath	Falkirk Stadium
	Compton 11'; Stewart 22'; Millar 34', 79' (pen.); Finnigan 69'	BBC Report	Ramsay 83' (pen.)	Attendance: 3,764; Referee: Nicholls

16 October 2010 First Division	Partick Thistle	1–0	Falkirk	Firhill Stadium
	Paton 17'	BBC Report		Attendance: 2,783; Referee: Somers

23 October 2010 First Division	Queen of the South	1–5	Falkirk	Palmerston Park
	Burns 49'	BBC Report	Finnigan 4', 74'; Marr 52'; Deuchar 84'; Twaddle 89'	Attendance: 2,254; Referee: Richmond

30 October 2010 First Division	Falkirk	3–3	Dundee	Falkirk Stadium
	Stewart 72', 75'; Millar 88' (pen.)	BBC Report	Griffiths 2'; Higgins 7'; Witteveen 84'	Attendance: 4,667; Referee: Winter

6 November 2010 First Division	Falkirk	0–1	Ross County	Falkirk Stadium
		BBC Report	Barrowman 27'	Attendance: 4,512; Referee: McDonald

13 November 2010 First Division	Stirling Albion	0–5	Falkirk	Doubletree Dunblane Stadium
	Buist (red card)	BBC Report	Flynn 6'; Stewart 15', 57'; Deuchar 71'; Finnigan 79'	Attendance: 2,168; Referee: Robertson

29 December 2010 First Division	Falkirk	0–0	Raith Rovers	Falkirk Stadium
		BBC Report		Attendance: 4,037; Referee: O'Reilly

2 January 2011 First Division	Falkirk	4–2	Stirling Albion	Falkirk Stadium
	Higginbotham 5', 32'; Allison (20 og.); McLean 60'	BBC Report	Witteveen 25'; Paul McHale 88'	Attendance: 3,722; Referee: Madden

15 January 2011 First Division	Falkirk	0–3	Queen of the South	Falkirk Stadium
		BBC Report	Johnston 27', 44'; McMenamin 39'	Attendance: 3,376; Referee: Salmond

22 January 2011 First Division	Dundee	1–0	Falkirk	Dens Park
	Forsyth 8'	BBC Report	Finnigan (red card)	Attendance: 4,763; Referee: Allan

29 January 2011 First Division	Raith Rovers	1–2	Falkirk	Stark's Park
	Ellis 10'	BBC Report	Compton 38'; Stewart 42'; McLean (red card)	Referee: Madden

12 February 2011 First Division	Falkirk	1–0	Morton	Falkirk Stadium
	Stewart 81'; Millar (red card) 90'	BBC Report	Monti (red card) 73'; Tidser (red card) 77'	Attendance: 2,829; Referee: Somers

15 February 2011 First Division	Dunfermline	1–1	Falkirk	East End Park
	Kirk 85'	BBC SPORT	Scobbie 79'	Attendance: 5,082; Referee: Law

26 February 2011 First Division	Falkirk	2–0	Cowdenbeath	Falkirk Stadium
	Murdoch 20'; Flynn 55'	BBC SPORT		Attendance: 3,581; Referee: Nicholls

1 March 2011 First Division	Morton	0–0	Falkirk	Cappielow Park
		BBC SPORT		Attendance: 1,343; Referee: Winter

5 March 2011 First Division	Ross County	2–1	Falkirk	Victoria Park
	Brittain 24'; Barrowman 87'	BBC Sport	Stewart 37'	Attendance: 2,676; Referee: Salmond

12 March 2011 First Division	Falkirk	1–2	Dunfermline	Falkirk Stadium
	Millar 58' (pen.)	BBC Sport	Woods 28'; Hardie 44'	Attendance: 5,121; Referee: Smith

19 March 2011 First Division	Falkirk	2–2	Dundee	Falkirk Stadium
	McManus 27'; Stewart 64'	BBC SPORT	Irvine 65'; Forsyth 81'	Attendance: 4,099; Referee: Collum

22 March 2011 First Division	Queen of the South	0–1	Falkirk	Palmerston Park
		BBC Sport	McManus 25'	Attendance: 1,270; Referee: Nicholls

26 March 2011 First Division	Falkirk	2–1	Raith Rovers	Falkirk Stadium
	Stewart 38', 79'	BBC SPORT	Baird 74'	Attendance: 5,008; Referee: Conroy

29 March 2011 First Division	Cowdenbeath	0–0	Falkirk	Central Park
		BBC SPORT		Attendance: 803; Referee: McKendrick

2 April 2011 First Division	Morton	2–2	Falkirk	Cappielow Park
	O'Brien 9'; Graham 78'	BBC SPORT	Stewart 61'; Duffie 87'	Attendance: 1,965; Referee: Madden

9 April 2011 First Division	Falkirk	2–3	Partick Thistle	Falkirk Stadium
	McManus 66'; Finnigan 85'	BBC SPORT	Erskine 8', 24'; Doolan 62'	Attendance: 3,735; Referee: Brines

12 April 2011 First Division	Partick Thistle	1–2	Falkirk	Firhill Stadium
	Kinniburgh 90'	BBC SPORT	Alston 64'; Finnigan 67'	Attendance: 1,142; Referee: Richmond

16 April 2011 First Division	Cowdenbeath	1–2	Falkirk	Central Park
	Stewart 32'	BBC SPORT	Stewart 65'; McLean 69'	Attendance: 636; Referee: Robertson

19 April 2011 First Division	Falkirk	2–0	Partick Thistle	Falkirk Stadium
	McManus 45'; Stewart 90'	BBC SPORT		Attendance: 3,439; Referee: Northcroft

23 April 2011 First Division	Stirling Albion	1–2	Falkirk	Doubletree Dunblane Stadium
	Smith 53'	BBC SPORT	Millar 37'; McManus 41'	Attendance: 1,288; Referee: O'Reilly

30 April 2011 First Division	Falkirk	0–1	Ross County	Falkirk Stadium
		BBC SPORT	Flynn 90'	Attendance: 4,143; Referee: Richmond

7 May 2011 First Division	Dunfermline	3–0	Falkirk	East End Park
	Phinn 21', 53'; Clarke 87'	BBC SPORT		Attendance: 7,826; Referee: Conroy

=== Scottish Challenge Cup ===
24 July 2010 Challenge Cup round 1	Stirling Albion	0–0 (3–1 p)	Falkirk	Doubletree Dunblane Stadium
		BBC Report		Attendance: 1,542; Referee: McKendrick
	Penalties
	Devine (penalty scored); Colquhoun (penalty scored); Gibson (penalty missed); Buist (penalty missed); Forsyth (penalty scored)		Millar (penalty missed); Finnigan (penalty missed); O'Brien (penalty scored); Stewart (penalty missed)

=== Scottish League Cup ===
24 August 2010 League Cup round 2	Partick Thistle	0–1	Falkirk	Firhill Stadium
		BBC Sport	flynn 58'	Attendance: 1,619; Referee: Richmond

21 September 2010 League Cup round 3	Falkirk	4–3	Hearts	Falkirk Stadium
	Stewart 13', 90'; Finnigan 41'; Flynn 80'	BBC Sport	Thomson (red card) 26'; Kyle 67' (pen.), 78'; Suso 74'	Attendance: 4,216; Referee: B Winter

26 October 2010 League Cup QF	Aberdeen	2–1	Falkirk	Pittodrie Stadium
	Hartley 64', 90+5' (pen.)	BBC Sport	Khalis 33'	Attendance: 6,710; Referee: O'Reilly

=== Scottish Cup ===
11 January 2011 Scottish Cup round 4	Falkirk	2–2	Partick Thistle	Falkirk Stadium
	Millar 37'; Compton 72'	BBC Sport	Buchanan 8'; Doolan 86'	Attendance: 2,039; Referee: Winter

18 January 2011 Scottish Cup round 4 Replay	Partick Thistle	1–0	Falkirk	Firhill Stadium
	Erskine 6'	BBC Sport		Attendance: 2,024; Referee: Winter

== Squad ==
Note: Flags indicate national team as defined under FIFA eligibility rules; some limited exceptions apply. Players may hold more than one non-FIFA nationality.

No.	Pos.	Nation	Player
—	GK	AUT	Bobby Olejnik
—	GK	SCO	Jamie Barclay
—	GK	SCO	Michael Andrews
—	DF	SCO	Tam Scobbie
—	DF	SCO	Marc Twaddle
—	DF	NIR	Brian McLean
—	DF	SCO	Chris Mitchell
—	DF	MAR	Mehdi Khalis
—	DF	SCO	Kieran Duffie
—	DF	WAL	James Bloom (on loan to Alloa Athletic)
—	DF	SCO	Ross Perry (on loan from Rangers)
—	DF	SCO	Keiran Stallard (on loan to Airdrie United)

No.	Pos.	Nation	Player
—	MF	SCO	Burton O'Brien
—	MF	SCO	Ryan Flynn
—	MF	SCO	Mark Millar
—	MF	ENG	Jack Compton
—	MF	SCO	Stewart Murdoch
—	MF	SCO	Craig McLeish (on loan to Dumbarton)
—	MF	SCO	Scott Davidson
—	FW	ENG	Carl Finnigan
—	FW	ENG	Kallum Higginbotham
—	FW	SCO	Mark Stewart
—	FW	SCO	Tam McManus
—	FW	POR	Pedro Moutinho

== League table ==
Pos	Team	Pld	W	D	L	GF	GA	GD	Pts	Promotion, qualification or relegation
1	Dunfermline Athletic (C, P)	36	20	10	6	66	31	+35	70	Promotion to the Premier League
2	Raith Rovers	36	17	9	10	47	35	+12	60	
3	Falkirk	36	17	7	12	57	41	+16	58	
4	Queen of the South	36	14	7	15	54	53	+1	49	
5	Partick Thistle	36	12	11	13	44	39	+5	47	

Source: SPFL
Rules for classification: 1) points; 2) goal difference; 3) number of goals scored.
(C) Champions; (P) Promoted
