= 2018–19 Dunfermline Athletic F.C. season =

Dunfermline Athletic
2018–19 season
- Chairman: Ross McArthur
- Manager: Allan Johnston (Until 9 January); Stevie Crawford (From 10 January)
- Stadium: East End Park; Dunfermline, Scotland (Capacity: 11,480)
- Championship: 7th
- Challenge Cup: Third round (lost to Alloa Athletic)
- League Cup: Second round (lost to Heart of Midlothian)
- Scottish Cup: Fourth round (lost to Raith Rovers)
- Top goalscorer: League: Bruce Anderson (5); All: Myles Hippolyte & Louis Longridge (6)
- Highest home attendance: League: 6,349 vs. Dundee United (27 October 2018); Cup: 8,601 vs. Heart of Midlothian (18 August 2018)
- Lowest home attendance: League: 4,347 vs. Ross County (2 February 2019); Cup: 1,046 vs. Inverness CT (17 July 2018)
- Average home league attendance: 5,015 (228)
- Biggest win: League: Dunfermline Athletic 3–0 Greenock Morton (1 December 2018); Dunfermline Athletic 3–0 Partick Thistle (26 February 2019); Cup: Brechin City 1–7 Dunfermline Athletic (25 July 2018)
- Biggest defeat: League: Ayr United 4–1 Dunfermline Athletic (25 August 2018); Cup: Dunfermline Athletic 0–1 Heart of Midlothian (18 August 2018)
Home colours	Away colours	Third colours
- All statistics correct as of 4 May 2019.

The 2018–19 season was Dunfermline Athletic's third season in the Scottish Championship, having finished 4th in the 2017–18 season.

== Season review ==
=== January ===
- 9 Jan 2019: After three-and-a-half years, Allan Johnston resigned as manager, along with assistant manager Sandy Clark. In a brief statement, club chairman Ross McArthur thanked both coaches for their efforts. First-team coach Stevie Crawford was announced as interim manager for the following league match against Dundee United.
- 10 Jan 2019: Crawford was appointed as head coach the following day, with former Pars defender Greg Shields returning from America to take up the position of assistant head coach. The club also announced changes to the management structure, with the appointment of former player Jackie McNamara as a consultant to offer ongoing technical support.

== Squad list ==
As of 4 May 2019, the final match of the season

No.	Name	Nationality	Position	Date of birth (age)	Signed from	Signed in	Signed until	Apps.	Goals
Goalkeepers
1	Sean Murdoch	(Scotland)	GK	31 July 1986 (age 40)	(United States) Rochester Rhinos	2015	2019	114	0
16	Lee Robinson	(England)	GK	2 July 1986 (age 40)	Queen of the South	2018	2019	49	0
20	Cammy Gill	(Scotland)	GK	7 April 1998 (age 28)	Dunfermline Athletic youth teams	2016	2019	4	0
40	Ryan Scully	(Republic of Ireland)	GK	29 October 1992 (age 33)	Greenock Morton	2019	2019	101	0
Defenders
2	Ryan Williamson	(Scotland)	DF	14 March 1996 (age 30)	Dunfermline Athletic youth teams	2013	2019	136	1
3	Jackson Longridge	(Scotland)	DF	12 April 1995 (age 31)	Livingston	2018	2020	41	5
4	Lewis Martin	(Scotland)	DF	8 April 1996 (age 30)	Dunfermline Athletic youth teams	2012	2019	131	3
5	Mark Durnan	(Scotland)	DF	28 November 1992 (age 33)	Dundee United	2018	2019	20	0
6	Lee Ashcroft	(Scotland)	DF	29 August 1993 (age 33)	Kilmarnock	2016	2020	132	8
14	Danny Devine	(Republic of Ireland)	DF	7 September 1992 (age 34)	Partick Thistle	2018	2020	37	2
Midfielders
7	Kallum Higginbotham	(England)	MF	15 June 1989 (age 37)	Kilmarnock	2016	2019	113	19
8	Tom Beadling	(Australia)	MF	16 January 1996 (age 30)	(England) Sunderland	2018	2020	30	4
10	Louis Longridge	(Scotland)	MF	5 July 1991 (age 35)	Falkirk	2018	2019	29	6
11	Aidan Connolly	(Scotland)	MF	15 August 1995 (age 31)	(England) York City	2018	2019	25	1
15	Myles Hippolyte	(England)	MF	9 November 1994 (age 31)	St Mirren	2018	2020	39	6
17	Joe Thomson	(Scotland)	MF	14 January 1997 (age 29)	Celtic	2018	2020	32	2
19	James Vincent	(England)	MF	27 September 1989 (age 37)	Dundee (loan)	2018	2019	44	2
28	James Craigen	(England)	MF	28 March 1991 (age 35)	Falkirk	2018	2019	58	2
35	Ryan Blair	(Scotland)	MF	23 February 1996 (age 30)	(Wales) Swansea City (loan)	2019	2019	11	1
Forwards
9	Andy Ryan	(Scotland)	FW	29 September 1994 (age 32)	Airdrieonians	2017	2019	43	13
12	Bruce Anderson	(Scotland)	FW	23 September 1998 (age 28)	Aberdeen (loan)	2019	2019	13	5
18	Faissal El Bakhtaoui	(France)	FW	8 November 1992 (age 33)	Dundee (loan)	2018	2019	125	46
23	Callum Smith	(Scotland)	FW	13 November 1999 (age 26)	Fife Elite Football Academy	2016	2020	25	4
36	Robbie Muirhead	(Scotland)	FW	8 March 1996 (age 30)	(England) Milton Keynes Dons	2018	2019	14	0

== Results and fixtures ==
Win Draw Loss Postponed

=== Pre-season ===
30 June 2018 Friendly	East Fife	1–2	Dunfermline Athletic	Methil, Scotland
14:00	Court 60'	Match report	Todd 62'; McCann 81'	Stadium: Bayview Stadium; Referee: Irvine

4 July 2018 Friendly	Raith Rovers	2–1	Dunfermline Athletic	Methil, Scotland
20:00	Gillespie 15'; Matthews 36'	Match Report	McCann 20'	Stadium: Bayview Stadium; Attendance: 701; Referee: Dallas

7 July 2018 Friendly	Dunfermline Athletic	0–4	Tranmere Rovers	Dunfermline, Scotland
15:00		Match Report	Cole 40'; Soukouna 51'; Walker-Rice 70'; Long 87'	Stadium: East End Park; Attendance: 723; Referee: Munro

9 July 2018 Friendly	Arbroath	0–1	Dunfermline Athletic	Arbroath, Scotland
19:45		Match report	Todd 62'	Stadium: Gayfield Park; Referee: Ross

12 July 2018 Friendly	Dunfermline Athletic	0–0	Motherwell	Dunfermline, Scotland
19:30		Match report		Stadium: East End Park; Attendance: 901; Referee: Clancy

=== Scottish Championship ===
4 August 2018 Match 1	Dundee United	2–3	Dunfermline Athletic	Dundee, Scotland
15:00	Clark 44'; Aird 89'	BBC Sport report	Thomson 59'; J. Longridge 67'; L. Longridge 84'	Stadium: Tannadice; Attendance: 6,532; Referee: Collum

11 August 2018 Match 2	Dunfermline Athletic	1–3	Ross County	Dunfermline, Scotland
15:00	L. Longridge 28'	BBC Sport report	Mullin 25'; Gardyne 42'; Watson 68'	Stadium: East End Park; Attendance: 4,949; Referee: Thomson

25 August 2018 Match 3	Ayr United	4–1	Dunfermline Athletic	Ayr, Scotland
15:00	Forrest 5', 37'; Shankland 39'; Moffat 81'	BBC Sport report	J. Longridge 55'	Stadium: Somerset Park; Attendance: 2,597; Referee: Anderson

1 September 2018 Match 4	Dunfermline Athletic	0–3	Inverness Caledonian Thistle	Dunfermline, Scotland
15:00		BBC Sport report	Rooney 51'; Polworth 72'; Oakley 83'	Stadium: East End Park; Attendance: 5,138; Referee: Robertson

15 September 2018 Match 5	Dunfermline Athletic	0–0	Alloa Athletic	Dunfermline, Scotland
15:00		BBC Sport report		Stadium: East End Park; Attendance: 4,568; Referee: Roncone

22 September 2018 Match 6	Greenock Morton	1–1	Dunfermline Athletic	Greenock, Scotland
15:00	Tiffoney 81'	BBC Sport report	Ryan 68'	Stadium: Cappielow Park; Attendance: 2,084; Referee: Anderson

28 September 2018 Match 7	Dunfermline Athletic	1–0	Partick Thistle	Dunfermline, Scotland
19:45	Connolly 69'	BBC Sport report		Stadium: East End Park; Attendance: 4,740; Referee: Clancy

6 October 2018 Match 8	Falkirk	0–2	Dunfermline Athletic	Falkirk, Scotland
15:00		BBC Sport report	Ryan 40'; Hippolyte 90'	Stadium: Falkirk Stadium; Attendance: 6,173; Referee: Madden

20 October 2018 Match 9	Dunfermline Athletic	0–1	Queen of the South	Dunfermline, Scotland
15:00		BBC Sport report	Todd 83'	Stadium: East End Park; Attendance: 4,443; Referee: Reid

27 October 2018 Match 10	Dunfermline Athletic	0–2	Dundee United	Dunfermline, Scotland
15:00		BBC Sport report	McMullan 24'; King 60'	Stadium: East End Park; Attendance: 6,349; Referee: Kirkland

30 October 2018 Match 11	Inverness Caledonian Thistle	2–2	Dunfermline Athletic	Inverness, Scotland
19:45	Calder 20'; White 34'	BBC Sport report	Keena 10', 29'	Stadium: Tulloch Caledonian Stadium; Attendance: 1,994; Referee: Cook

3 November 2018 Match 12	Alloa Athletic	0–1	Dunfermline Athletic	Alloa, Scotland
15:00		BBC Sport report	J. Longridge 69'	Stadium: Recreation Park; Attendance: 1,169; Referee: Munro

10 November 2018 Match 13	Dunfermline Athletic	0–1	Falkirk	Dunfermline, Scotland
15:00		BBC Sport report	Rudden 71'	Stadium: East End Park; Attendance: 5,762; Referee: Dallas

24 November 2018 Match 14	Ross County	2–1	Dunfermline Athletic	Dingwall, Scotland
15:00	McKay 9'; Lindsay 60'	BBC Sport report	Higginbotham (red card) 15'; Draper (Note: The BBC Sport article incorrectly attributes the goal to Dunfermline player Jackson Longridge; however, an own goal was scored by Ross County defender Ross Draper.) 73' (o.g.)	Stadium: Global Energy Stadium; Referee: Muir

1 December 2018 Match 15	Dunfermline Athletic	3–0	Greenock Morton	Dunfermline, Scotland
15:00	Keena 3'; El Bakhtaoui 42' (pen.); Craigen 86'	BBC Sport report		Stadium: East End Park; Attendance: 4,370; Referee: Beaton

8 December 2018 Match 16	Partick Thistle	2–0	Dunfermline Athletic	Glasgow, Scotland
15:00	Spittal 12'; Storey 56'	BBC Sport report		Stadium: Firhill Stadium; Attendance: 2,566; Referee: Clancy

15 December 2018 Match 17	Queen of the South	0–0	Dunfermline Athletic	Dumfries, Scotland
15:00		BBC Sport report		Stadium: Palmerston Park; Attendance: 727; Referee: Kirkland

22 December 2018 Match 18	Dunfermline Athletic	0–0	Ayr United	Dunfermline, Scotland
15:00		BBC Sport report		Stadium: East End Park; Attendance: 4,916; Referee: Steven McLean

29 December 2018 Match 19	Falkirk	2–4	Dunfermline Athletic	Falkirk, Scotland
15:00	McKee 2'; Harrison 74'	BBC Sport report	Hippolyte 13'; Beadling 17', 51'; Vincent 67'	Stadium: Falkirk Stadium; Attendance: 5,786; Referee: Steven

5 January 2019 Match 20	Dunfermline Athletic	2–2	Alloa Athletic	Dunfermline, Scotland
15:00	Kenna 18'; Flannigan 73' (o.g.)	BBC Sport report	Trouten 49', 90+2'	Stadium: East End Park; Attendance: 4,723; Referee: Ross

12 January 2019 Match 21	Dundee United	1–0	Dunfermline Athletic	Dundee, Scotland
15:00	Clark 81'	BBC Sport report		Stadium: Tannadice; Attendance: 5,913; Referee: Muir

26 January 2019 Match 22	Greenock Morton	0–0	Dunfermline Athletic	Greenock, Scotland
15:00		BBC Sport report		Stadium: Cappielow Park; Attendance: 1,907; Referee: Newlands

2 February 2019 Match 23	Dunfermline Athletic	1–2	Ross County	Dunfermline, Scotland
15:00	Anderson 41'	BBC Sport report	McKay 52'; Gardyne 77'	Stadium: East End Park; Attendance: 4,347; Referee: Cook

16 February 2019 Match 24	Dunfermline Athletic	1–0	Inverness Caledonian Thistle	Dunfermline, Scotland
15:00	Thomson 47'	BBC Sport report		Stadium: East End Park; Attendance: 4,497; Referee: Kirkland

23 February 2019 Match 25	Ayr United	0–1	Dunfermline Athletic	Ayr, Scotland
15:00		BBC Sport report	L. Longridge 71' (pen.)	Stadium: Somerset Park; Attendance: 2,202; Referee: Munro

26 February 2019 Match 26	Dunfermline Athletic	3–0	Partick Thistle	Dunfermline, Scotland
19:45	Anderson 47', 86'; Devine 74'	BBC Sport report		Stadium: East End Park; Attendance: 4,904; Referee: Aitken

2 March 2019 Match 27	Dunfermline Athletic	1–0	Queen of the South	Dunfermline, Scotland
15:00	Blair 74'	BBC Sport report		Stadium: East End Park; Attendance: 4,708; Referee: Duncan

9 March 2019 Match 28	Alloa Athletic	0–1	Dunfermline Athletic	Alloa, Scotland
15:00		BBC Sport report	Anderson 53'	Stadium: Recreation Park; Attendance: 1,750; Referee: Anderson

16 Mar 2019 Match 29	Dunfermline Athletic	P – P	Dundee United	Dunfermline, Scotland
15:00				Stadium: East End Park
Note: _{Match postponed due to waterlogged pitch}

26 Mar 2019 Match 29^{(Rearranged)}	Dunfermline Athletic	0–1	Dundee United	Dunfermline, Scotland
15:00		BBC Sport report	Pawlett 24'	Stadium: East End Park; Attendance: 6,096; Referee: Anderson

29 Mar 2019 Match 30	Dunfermline Athletic	0–1	Ayr United	Dunfermline, Scotland
19:05		BBC Sport report	McDaid 24'	Stadium: East End Park; Attendance: 4,671; Referee: Duncan

6 April 2019 Match 31	Partick Thistle	2–2	Dunfermline Athletic	Glasgow, Scotland
15:00	Blair 31' (o.g.); McDonald 77'	BBC Sport report	Beadling 10'; Anderson 24'	Stadium: Firhill Stadium; Attendance: 2,850; Referee: Clancy

9 April 2019 Match 32	Ross County	1–0	Dunfermline Athletic	Dingwall, Scotland
19:45	Grivosti 60'	BBC Sport report		Stadium: Global Energy Stadium; Attendance: 3,222; Referee: Robertson

13 April 2019 Match 33	Dunfermline Athletic	0–1	Falkirk	Dunfermline, Scotland
15:00		BBC Sport report	Keillor-Dunn 77'	Stadium: East End Park; Attendance: 6,089; Referee: Collum

20 April 2019 Match 34	Queen of the South	2–1	Dunfermline Athletic	Dumfries, Scotland
15:00	Wilson 44'; Todd 52'	BBC Sport report	J. Longridge 90+5'	Stadium: Palmerston Park; Attendance: 1,704; Referee: Reid

27 April 2019 Match 35	Dunfermline Athletic	0–1	Greenock Morton	Dunfermline, Scotland
15:00	J. Longridge (yellow card) 73' (yellow-red card)	BBC Sport report	Kiltie 84' (pen.)	Stadium: East End Park; Attendance: 4,883; Referee: Dallas

4 May 2019 Match 36	Inverness Caledonian Thistle	1–0	Dunfermline Athletic	Inverness, Scotland
15:00	Austin 35'	BBC Sport report		Stadium: Tulloch Caledonian Stadium; Attendance: 2,828; Referee: Beaton

=== Scottish League Cup ===
==== Group stage ====
17 July 2018 Match 1	Dunfermline Athletic	3–0	Peterhead	Dunfermline, Scotland
19:45	Hippolyte 42'; Higginbotham 88' (pen.); Ryan 90+3'	BBC Sport report		Stadium: East End Park; Attendance: 1,848; Referee: McLean

22 July 2018 Match 2	Dundee	0–1	Dunfermline Athletic	Dundee, Scotland
15:00		BBC Sport report	Longridge 2'	Stadium: Dens Park; Attendance: 2,870; Referee: Madden

25 July 2018 Match 3	Brechin City	1–7	Dunfermline Athletic	Brechin, Scotland
19:45	Shields 60'	BBC Sport report	Devine 7'; Longridge 10'; El Bakhtaoui 15', 43'; Ryan 57', 63'; Hippolyte 85'	Stadium: Glebe Park; Attendance: 658; Referee: Newlands

28 July 2018 Match 4	Dunfermline Athletic	3–1	Stirling Albion	Dunfermline, Scotland
15:00	Hippolyte 47', 90+1'; Vincent 56'	BBC Sport report	MacDonald 35'	Stadium: East End Park; Attendance: 2,359; Referee: Roncone

==== Knockout phase ====
18 August 2018 Scottish League Cup round 2	Dunfermline Athletic	0–1	Heart of Midlothian	Dunfermline, Scotland
15:00		BBC Sport report	Lee 79'	Stadium: East End Park; Attendance: 8,601; Referee: Madden

=== Scottish Challenge Cup ===
14 August 2018 Challenge Cup round 1	Inverness Caledonian Thistle	1–2	Dunfermline Athletic	Inverness, Scotland
19:45	White 61'	Match report	Higginbotham 24' (pen.); Smith 87'	Stadium: Caledonian Stadium; Attendance: 1,046; Referee: Muir

8 September 2018 Challenge Cup round 1	Boreham Wood	0–0 (5–6 p)	Dunfermline Athletic	Borehamwood, England
15:00		Match report		Stadium: Meadow Park; Attendance: 1001; Referee: Boyce
	Penalties
	Murtagh (penalty scored); Umerah (penalty scored); Fyfield (penalty scored); Ilesanmi (penalty scored); Hackett-Fairchild (penalty scored); C. Smith (penalty missed)		(penalty scored) M. Martin; (penalty scored) Craigen; (penalty scored) Hippolyte; (penalty scored) El Bakhtaoui; (penalty scored) Connolly; (penalty scored) Muirhead

13 October 2018 Challenge Cup round 3	Dunfermline Athletic	2–2 (4–5 p)	Alloa Athletic	Dunfermline, Scotland
15:00	L. Longridge 28', 47' (pen.)	Match report	Trouten 8', 70'	Stadium: East End Park; Attendance: 1, 469; Referee: Walsh
	Penalties
	Craigen (penalty scored); L. Longridge (penalty scored); Hippolyte (penalty scored); Beadling (penalty scored); Connolly (penalty missed)		(penalty scored) Taggart; (penalty scored) Flannigan; (penalty scored) Zanatta; (penalty scored) Trouten; (penalty scored) Graham

=== Scottish Cup ===
19 January 2019 Scottish Cup round 4	Raith Rovers	3–0	Dunfermline Athletic	Kirkcaldy, Scotland
15:00	Vaughan 69' (pen.), 78', 81'	BBC Sport report		Stadium: Stark's Park; Attendance: 6,013; Referee: Madden

== Squad statistics ==
=== Captains ===
No.	P	Name	Country	No. games	Notes
6	DF	Lee Ashcroft	(Scotland)	44	Club Captain
7	MF	Kallum Higginbotham	(England)	1	

Last updated: 4 May 2019
Source: Competitive match reports.
Competitive matches only
Matches started as captain only
Country: FIFA nationality; No.: Squad number; P: Position; Name: Player name; No. Games: Number of games started as captain.

=== Appearances and goals ===
During the 2018–19 season, Dunfermline used twenty-eight different players in competitive matches. The table below shows the number of appearances and goals scored by each player. Defender and captain Lee Ashcroft made the most appearances, playing forty-four out of a possible 45 games. Myles Hippolyte and Louis Longridge scored the most goals, with six in all competitions. Loanee Bruce Anderson finished as the top-scorer for league matches, with 5 goals.

As of 4 May 2019

No.	Pos	Nat	Player	Total		Scottish Championship		Scottish Cup		League Cup		Challenge Cup	
No.	Pos	Nat	Player	Apps	Goals	Apps	Goals	Apps	Goals	Apps	Goals	Apps	Goals
1	GK	(Scotland) SCO	Sean Murdoch	0	0	0	0	0	0	0	0	0	0
2	DF	(Scotland) SCO	Ryan Williamson	23	0	15+4	0	0	0	4	0	0	0
3	DF	(Scotland) SCO	Jackson Longridge	41	5	32+1	4	1	0	5	1	2	0
4	DF	(Scotland) SCO	Lewis Martin	2	0	1+1	0	0	0	0	0	0	0
5	FW	(Scotland) SCO	Mark Durnan	20	0	11+2	0	0+1	0	5	0	1	0
6	DF	(Scotland) SCO	Lee Ashcroft	44	0	36	0	1	0	5	0	2	0
7	MF	(England) ENG	Kallum Higginbotham	28	2	17+5	0	1	0	3	1	2	1
8	MF	(Australia) AUS	Tom Beadling	22	3	17+2	3	1	0	0	0	1+1	0
9	FW	(Scotland) SCO	Andy Ryan	20	5	9+4	2	0	0	0+5	3	2	0
10	FW	(Scotland) SCO	Louis Longridge	29	6	19+3	3	0	0	5	1	2	2
11	MF	(Scotland) SCO	Aidan Connolly	25	1	12+5	1	0	0	0+5	0	2+1	0
12	FW	(Scotland) SCO	Bruce Anderson	14	5	14	5	0	0	0	0	0	0
14	DF	(Republic of Ireland) IRL	Danny Devine	37	2	30	1	1	0	5	1	1	0
15	MF	(England) ENG	Myles Hippolyte	39	6	13+18	2	1	0	5	4	0+2	0
16	GK	(England) ENG	Lee Robinson	28	0	21	0	1	0	4	0	2	0
17	MF	(Scotland) SCO	Joe Thomson	32	2	24+3	2	1	0	3	0	1	0
18	FW	(France) FRA	Faissal El Bakhtaoui	34	3	21+7	1	1	0	3	2	2	0
19	MF	(England) ENG	James Vincent	32	2	25+1	1	1	0	2+1	1	2	0
20	GK	(Scotland) SCO	Cammy Gill	3	0	1	0	0	0	1	0	1	0
22	DF	(Scotland) SCO	Stuart Morrison	2	0	1	0	0	0	0	0	1	0
23	FW	(Scotland) SCO	Callum Smith	4	1	1+2	0	0	0	0	0	1	1
26	MF	(Scotland) SCO	Matty Todd	10	0	4+4	0	0+1	0	0	0	1	0
27	FW	(Scotland) SCO	Lewis McCann	8	0	0+6	0	0	0	0+1	0	1	0
28	MF	(England) ENG	James Craigen	41	1	31+2	1	1	0	5	0	2	0
35	MF	(Scotland) SCO	Ryan Blair	13	1	12+1	1	0	0	0	0	0	0
36	FW	(Scotland) SCO	Robbie Muirhead	14	0	4+8	0	0+1	0	0	0	1	0
40	GK	(Republic of Ireland) IRL	Ryan Scully	14	0	14	0	0	0	0	0	0	0
Players away from the club on loan:
Players who appeared for Dunfermline Athletic but left during the season:
12	MF	(France) FRA	Malaury Martin	12	0	8+2	0	0	0	0	0	1+1	0
35	FW	(Republic of Ireland) IRL	Aidan Keena	12	4	10+2	4	0	0	0	0	0	0

=== Clean sheets ===
No.	Pos	Nat	Name	Total	Scottish Championship	Scottish Cup	Scottish League Cup	Scottish Challenge Cup
16	GK	(England)	Lee Robinson	10	7		2	1
40	GK	(Republic of Ireland)	Ryan Scully	6	6			
Total				16	13	0	2	1

Last updated: 4 May 2019
Source: Match reports in Competitive matches

=== Goalscorers ===
During the 2018–19 season, sixteen Dunfermline players scored 51 goals in all competitions, with 2 goals having been an own goal.

As of match played 4 May 2018

Place	Position	Nation	Name	Total	Scottish Championship	Scottish Cup	Scottish League Cup	Scottish Challenge Cup
1	FW	(Scotland)	Louis Longridge	6	3		1	2
1	MF	(England)	Myles Hippolyte	6	2		4	
3	FW	(Scotland)	Bruce Anderson	5	5			
3	DF	(Scotland)	Jackson Longridge	5	4		1	
3	FW	(Scotland)	Andy Ryan	5	2		3	
6	FW	(Republic of Ireland)	Aidan Keena	4	4			
7	FW	(France)	Faissal El Bakhtaoui	3	1		2	
8	MF	(Australia)	Tom Beadling	3	3			
8	MF	(Scotland)	Joe Thomson	2	2			
8	DF	(Republic of Ireland)	Danny Devine	2	1		1	
8	MF	(England)	James Vincent	2	1		1	
8	MF	(England)	Kallum Higginbotham	2			1	1
13	MF	(Scotland)	Ryan Blair	1	1			
13	MF	(Scotland)	Aidan Connolly	1	1			
13	MF	(England)	James Craigen	1	1			
13	FW	(Scotland)	Callum Smith	1				1
—			Own goal	2	2			
Total				51	33	0	14	4

=== Disciplinary record ===
As of match played 9 March 2019

Squad number	Position	Nation	Name	Total		Scottish Championship		Scottish Cup		Scottish League Cup		Scottish Challenge Cup	
Squad number	Position	Nation	Name	Booked	Sent off (straight red)	Booked	Sent off (straight red)	Booked	Sent off (straight red)	Booked	Sent off (straight red)	Booked	Sent off (straight red)
6	DF	(Scotland)	Lee Ashcroft	4	1	4			1				
7	DF	(England)	Kallum Higginbotham	2	1	2	1						
15	MF	(England)	Myles Hippolyte	8		6				1		1	
14	DF	(Republic of Ireland)	Danny Devine	5		4		1					
18	FW	(France)	Faissal El Bakhtaoui	4		4							
28	MF	(England)	James Craigen	5		4				1			
3	DF	(Scotland)	Jackson Longridge	3		3							
19	DF	(England)	James Vincent	3		3							
16	MF	(England)	Lee Robinson	3		1		1				1	
8	DF	(Australia)	Tom Beadling	2		2							
9	FW	(Scotland)	Andy Ryan	2		2							
17	DF	(Scotland)	Joe Thomson	2		2							
11	DF	(Scotland)	Aidan Connolly	1		1							
12	FW	(Scotland)	Bruce Anderson	1		1							
23	FW	(Scotland)	Callum Smith	1		1							
35	FW	(Scotland)	Ryan Blair	1		1							
36	FW	(Scotland)	Robbie Muirhead	1		1							
5	DF	(Scotland)	Mark Durnan	1						1			
12	MF	(France)	Malaury Martin	1								1	
27	MF	(Scotland)	Lewis McCann	1								1	
Total				51	2	42	1	2	1	3	0	4	0

== Club statistics ==
=== League table ===
Pos	Team	Pld	W	D	L	GF	GA	GD	Pts	Promotion, qualification or relegation
5	Greenock Morton	36	11	13	12	36	45	−9	46	
6	Partick Thistle	36	12	7	17	43	52	−9	43	
7	Dunfermline Athletic	36	11	8	17	33	40	−7	41	
8	Alloa Athletic	36	10	9	17	39	53	−14	39	
9	Queen of the South (O)	36	9	11	16	41	48	−7	38	Qualification for the Championship play-offs

Source: SPFL
Rules for classification: 1) Points; 2) Goal difference; 3) Goals scored; 4) Points in head-to-head matches; 5) Goal difference in hth matches; 6). Goals scored in hth matches; 7). Play-off (only for deciding promotion, play-off participation and relegation).
(O) Play-off winners

==== Results by round ====
Round	1	2	3	4	5	6	7	8	9	10	11	12	13	14	15	16	17	18	19	20	21	22	23	24	25	26	27	28	29	30	31	32	33	34	35	36
Ground	A	H	A	H	H	A	H	A	H	H	A	A	H	A	H	A	A	H	A	H	A	A	H	H	A	H	H	A	H	H	A	A	H	A	H	A
Result	W	L	L	L	D	D	W	W	L	L	D	W	L	L	W	L	D	D	W	D	L	D	L	W	W	W	W	W	L	L	D	L	L	L	L	L
Position	2	6	7	6	8	8	8	8	8	8	5	5	7	7	7	7	7	7	7	7	7	7	7	7	5	5	4	4	5	5	5	5	5	5	6	7

Updated to match(es) played on 11 May 2019. Source: DAFC.co.uk
A = Away; H = Home; W = Win; D = Draw; L = Loss

==== Results summary ====
Overall								Home						Away					
Pld	W	D	L	GF	GA	GD	Pts	W	D	L	GF	GA	GD	W	D	L	GF	GA	GD
36	11	8	17	33	40	−7	41	5	3	10	13	18	−5	6	5	7	20	22	−2

Last updated: 11 May 2019.
Source: Scottish Championship

=== League cup table ===
Pos	Team	Pld	W	PW	PL	L	GF	GA	GD	Pts	Qualification	DNF	DND	BRE	STI	PET
1	Dunfermline Athletic (Q)	4	4	0	0	0	14	2	+12	12	Qualification for the Second round	—	—	—	3–1	3–0
2	Dundee (Q)	4	3	0	0	1	8	1	+7	9	Qualification for the Second round	0–1	—	2–0	—	—
3	Brechin City	4	1	0	1	2	3	10	−7	4		1–7	—	—	—	0–0p
4	Stirling Albion	4	1	0	0	3	4	9	−5	3		—	0–4	1–2	—	—
5	Peterhead	4	0	1	0	3	0	7	−7	2		—	0–2	—	0–2	—

Rules for classification: 1) goal difference, 2) goals scored, 3) away goals scored, 4) matches won, 5) away matches won, 6) drawing of lots.
(Q) Qualified to the phase indicated

=== Home attendances ===
Win Draw Loss

Comp	Date	Score	Opponent	Attendance
League Cup	17 July 2018	3–0	Peterhead	1,848
League Cup	28 July 2018	3–1	Stirling Albion	2,359
Championship	11 August 2018	1–3	Ross County	4,949
League Cup	18 August 2018	0–1	Heart of Midlothian	8,601
			Average league attendance:	4,949
			Total league attendance:	4,949
			Average total attendance:	4,439
			Total attendance:	17,757

Last updated: 20 August 2018
Source: Match reports in Results

== Awards ==
=== Monthly ===
==== Scottish Championship Manager of the Month ====
Month	Name
February	(Scotland) Stevie Crawford

==== Club ====
Month	Name
August	(Scotland) Jackson Longridge
September	(England) James Craigen
October	(France) Malaury Martin
November	(Scotland) Jackson Longridge
December	(Scotland) Joe Thomson
January	(Scotland) Joe Thomson
February	(England) James Craigen
March	(Republic of Ireland) Ryan Scully

== Transfers ==
=== First team ===
==== Players in ====
Date	Position	No.	Nationality	Name	From	Fee	Ref.
1 June 2018	DF	3	(Scotland)	Jackson Longridge	Livingston	Free	
1 June 2018	FW	10	(Scotland)	Louis Longridge	Falkirk	Free	
6 June 2018	DF	14	(Republic of Ireland)	Danny Devine	Partick Thistle	Free	
6 June 2018	DF	5	(Scotland)	Mark Durnan	Dundee United	Free	
15 June 2018	MF	17	(Scotland)	Joe Thomson	Celtic	Free	
18 June 2018	MF	18	(Republic of Ireland)	Willo Flood	Dundee United	Free	
20 June 2018	MF	11	(Scotland)	Aidan Connolly	(England) York City	Free	
1 July 2018	MF	8	(Australia)	Tom Beadling	(England) Sunderland	Free	
13 July 2018	MF	15	(England)	Myles Hippolyte	St Mirren	Free	
31 August 2018	FW	36	(Scotland)	Robbie Muirhead	(England) Milton Keynes Dons	Free	
24 January 2019	GK	40	(Republic of Ireland)	Ryan Scully	Greenock Morton	Free	

==== Players out ====
Date	Position	No.	Nationality	Name	To	Fee	Ref.
23 May 2018	FW	10	(Scotland)	Nicky Clark	Dundee United	Free	
31 May 2018	DF	4	(France)	Jean-Yves Mvoto	(Norway) Nybergsund	Free	
31 May 2018	DF	5	(Republic of Ireland)	Callum Morris	Ross County	Free	
31 May 2018	MF	8	(England)	Nat Wedderburn	Raith Rovers	Free	
31 May 2018	MF	11	(England)	Joe Cardle	(England) AFC Fylde	Free	
31 May 2018	MF	13	(Scotland)	Aaron Splaine	(Republic of Ireland) Derry City	Free	
31 May 2018	DF	14	(England)	Jason Talbot	Cowdenbeath	Free	
31 May 2018	MF	15	(Scotland)	Michael Paton	Dumbarton	Free	
31 May 2018	MF	18	(Scotland)	Conner Duthie	Stenhousemuir	Free	
31 May 2018	MF	19	(Scotland)	Scott Lochhead	(Australia) Bentleigh Greens	Free	
31 May 2018	MF	27	(Northern Ireland)	Dean Shiels	(Republic of Ireland) Derry City	Free	
1 June 2018	MF	17	(Canada)	Fraser Aird	Dundee United	Free	
6 June 2018	FW	9	(Scotland)	Declan McManus	Ross Rounty	Free	
27 June 2018	MF	18	(Republic of Ireland)	Willo Flood	(Indonesia) Bali United	Free	

==== Loans in ====
Date	Position	No.	Nationality	Name	From	Duration	Ref.
3 July 2018	MF	19	(England)	James Vincent	Dundee	End of season	
12 July 2018	FW	18	(France)	Faissal El Bakhtaoui	Dundee	End of season	
31 August 2018	MF	12	(France)	Malaury Martin	Heart of Midlothian	End of season (recalled in January)	
31 August 2018	FW	35	(Republic of Ireland)	Aidan Keena	Heart of Midlothian	End of season (recalled in January)	
31 January 2019	FW	12	(Scotland)	Bruce Anderson	Aberdeen	End of season	
31 January 2019	MF	35	(Scotland)	Ryan Blair	(Wales) Swansea City	End of season	

==== Loans out ====
Date	Position	No.	Nationality	Name	To	Duration	Ref.
24 August 2018	FW	23	(Scotland)	Callum Smith	Arbroath	End of season (recalled in January)	

== Contract extensions ==
Date	Position	Nationality	Name	Length	Expiry	Ref.
17 May 2018	GK	(England)	Lee Robinson	1 year	2019	
17 May 2018	DF	(Scotland)	Lee Ashcroft	2 years	2020	
17 May 2018	MF	(England)	James Craigen	1 year	2019	
24 May 2018	GK	(Scotland)	Craig Burt	1 year	2019	
24 May 2018	MF	(Scotland)	Brandon Luke	1 year	2019	
1 June 2018	DF	(Scotland)	Lewis Martin	1 year	2019	
14 June 2018	MF	(England)	Kallum Higginbotham	1 year	2019	
