= Lewis Spence (footballer) =

Scottish footballer (born 1996)

Personal information
- Full name: Lewis Robert Spence
- Date of birth: 28 January 1996 (age 30)
- Place of birth: Kirkcaldy, Scotland
- Position: Midfielder

Youth career
- –2007: Heart of Midlothian
- 2007–2012: Rangers
- 2012–2013: Dunfermline Athletic

Senior career*
Years	Team	Apps	(Gls)
2013–2017	Dunfermline Athletic	34	(0)
2016	→ Brechin City (loan)	13	(3)
2016	→ Brechin City (loan)	7	(0)
2017–2019	Dundee	31	(0)
2019–2020	Ross County	30	(0)
2020–2021	Scunthorpe United	41	(1)
2021–2023	Hamilton Academical	23	(1)
2023	Edinburgh City	13	(0)
2023–2026	East Kilbride	65	(2)
2026	Dumbarton	0	(0)
- * Club domestic league appearances and goals as of 24 October 2026

Lewis Robert Spence (born 28 January 1996) is a Scottish professional footballer who last played as a midfielder for Scottish League Two side Dumbarton. Spence has previously played for Dunfermline Athletic, two short loan spells with Brechin City, Dundee, Ross County, Hamilton Academical, Edinburgh City and East Kilbride.

== Career ==
=== Dunfermline Athletic ===
Born in Kirkcaldy, Fife, Spence played for Cowdenbeath-based Blue Brazil Boys Club, before playing youth football with Heart of Midlothian and Rangers. In 2012, he joined Dunfermline Athletic, playing for their under-20 squad during the 2012–13 season. In the next season, Spence began to become involved with the Dunfermline first team. He appeared on the substitutes' bench on a number of occasions, before making his debut as an 89th-minute substitute for Ryan Williamson in a 0–4 defeat to Rangers at East End Park. His first starting appearance came in Scottish League One against Ayr United, with Spence playing 78 minutes of the 1–1 draw, before being replaced by Andy Geggan. In total, Spence made six appearances for Dunfermline during the 2013–14 season, with more than half being made as a substitute.

Spence played in Dunfermline's first match of the 2014–15 season, a 5–1 win over Annan Athletic in the Scottish League Cup. He scored his first goal for the club in a loss to St Mirren at St Mirren Park, also in the League Cup. Spence played 31 times for Dunfermline during the season, scoring once, as the team finished in seventh position in League One.

Following John Potter's resignation as manager and the appointment of Allan Johnston, Spence found himself on the fringes of the first team squad and made just one appearance for the club in the 2015–16 season, coming on as an 80th-minute substitute for Geggan in a 4–1 victory over Arbroath in August 2015. In January 2016, Spence was sent to fellow Scottish League One team Brechin City on a development loan to provide him with more game time. He made 13 appearances for Brechin and scored 3 goals, including an "outstanding" 35-yard lob against Airdrieonians, which was nominated in April 2016 as one of the club's goals of the season. His contribution helped Brechin avoid relegation, after they had been bottom of the league for the majority of the season.

At the end of the 2015–16 season, Spence signed a new one-year contract with Dunfermline which would see him remain at the club until the end of the 2016–17 season. After making a handful of appearances for the first-team, Spence returned to Brechin on a one-month loan in September 2016, which was subsequently extended for an additional month. Returning to Dunfermline, Spence made only seven appearances in the two seasons in which Johnston was in charge. He left the club in May 2017 when his contract expired, having made 45 appearances in his five years with Dunfermline.

=== Dundee ===
On 22 June 2017, Spence signed a one-year contract with Scottish Premiership club Dundee, under manager Neil McCann who had previously coached him at Dunfermline. After impressing in his first season, Spence signed a two-year contract extension in April 2018, which was due to keep him at the club until summer 2020. McCann was replaced as manager by Jim McIntyre during the 2018–19 season, and Spence was released from his contract in January 2019.

=== Ross County ===
After his release by Dundee, Spence signed for Scottish Championship club Ross County. In his first season, he played 21 games, including 15 in the league. He helped Ross County win the title and therefore promotion into the Scottish Premiership. He was also a part of the Scottish League Challenge Cup final squad, that Ross County won 3–1 against Connah's Quay. He spent another year at the club, only making 15 appearances.

=== Scunthorpe United ===
Spence made his move to England after signing a two-year contract with Scunthorpe United in August 2020. In his first season at the club, he started in 44 games, including 41 league games. He scored his only goal for Scunthorpe in a 3–1 win over Harrogate Town. After Scunthorpe poor season, which saw them narrowly avoid relegation, he asked to leave because he believed "Scunthorpe wasn't for [him]." His wish was granted and he moved back to Scotland.

=== Hamilton Academical ===
In July 2021, Spence confirmed that he had joined Hamilton Academical; he signed a two-year contract. He scored his first goal for the Accies in a Scottish Challenge Cup tie against Hearts U20s. Spence left the club by mutual consent in June 2023.

=== Edinburgh City ===
On 4 August 2023, Spence joined Scottish League One club Edinburgh City. He made his debut the following day in a league game away to Stirling Albion. Spence would be released by the Citizens in December 2023 following budget cuts amid financial turmoil.

=== East Kilbride ===
On 29 December 2023, Spence joined Lowland Football League club East Kilbride. Spence would win the Lowland League title with East Kilbride in April 2024.

Spence scored his first goal with Kilby in a Scottish Challenge Cup game against East Stirlingshire. Spence won the treble with East Kilbride in the 2024–25 season, lifting the Lowland League, SFA South Region Challenge Cup and Lowland League Cup trophies as well as reaching the semi-finals of the Scottish Challenge Cup. To cap it off, Spence and the Kilby won the Scottish League Two play-offs to earn promotion to the SPFL League Two. Spence and Kilby made it back-to-back promotions the following season as East Kilbride won League Two to earn promotion to the Scottish League One. On 22 May 2026, East Kilbride confirmed that Spence would depart after both parties were unable to agree new terms.

=== Dumbarton ===
Spence joined Dumbarton in June 2026 however left the club in October 2026, having played just twice after suffering an injury on his debut.

== Career statistics ==
As of 06:31, 23 September 2026 (UTC)

Appearances and goals by club, season and competition
Club	Season	League			Scottish Cup		League Cup		Other		Total	
Club	Season	Division	Apps	Goals	Apps	Goals	Apps	Goals	Apps	Goals	Apps	Goals
Dunfermline Athletic	2013–14	Scottish League One	6	0	0	0	0	0	1	0	7	0
Dunfermline Athletic	2014–15	Scottish League One	26	0	1	0	2	1	2	0	31	1
Dunfermline Athletic	2015–16	Scottish League One	0	0	0	0	0	0	1	0	1	0
Dunfermline Athletic	2016–17	Scottish Championship	2	0	0	0	4	0	0	0	6	0
Dunfermline Athletic	Total		34	0	1	0	6	1	4	0	45	1
Brechin City (loan)	2015–16	Scottish League One	13	3	0	0	0	0	0	0	13	3
Brechin City (loan)	2016–17	Scottish League One	7	0	0	0	0	0	0	0	7	0
Brechin City (loan)	Total		20	3	0	0	0	0	0	0	20	3
Dundee	2017–18	Scottish Premiership	18	0	1	0	2	0	–		21	0
Dundee	2018–19	Scottish Premiership	13	0	0	0	3	1	–		16	1
Dundee	Total		31	0	1	0	5	1	0	0	37	1
Ross County	2018–19	Scottish Championship	15	0	3	0	0	0	1 (Note: Appearance(s) in the Scottish Challenge Cup)	0	19	0
Ross County	2019–20	Scottish Premiership	15	0	0	0	0	0	–		15	0
Ross County	Total		30	0	3	0	0	0	1	0	34	0
Scunthorpe United	2020–21	League Two	41	1	1	0	1	0	1 (Note: Appearance(s) in the Football League Trophy)	0	44	1
Hamilton Academical	2021–22	Scottish Championship	20	1	0	0	2	0	1	1	23	2
Hamilton Academical	2022–23	Scottish Championship	0	0	0	0	2	0	0	0	2	0
Hamilton Academical	Total		20	1	0	0	4	0	1	1	25	2
Edinburgh City	2023–24	Scottish League One	13	0	0	0	0	0	0	0	13	0
East Kilbride	2023–24	Lowland League	10	0	0	0	0	0	6 (Note: Appearance(s) in the South Challenge Cup, the Lowland League Cup and the Scottish League Two play-offs)	0	16	0
East Kilbride	2024–25	Lowland League	25	1	3	0	4	0	18 (Note: 6 appearances and 1 goal in the Scottish Challenge Cup, 5 appearances and 1 goal in the South Challenge Cup, 3 appearances in the Lowland League Cup, 4 appearances in the League Two play-offs)	2	50	3
East Kilbride	2025–26	Scottish League Two	30	1	1	0	4	0	4	0	39	1
East Kilbride	Total		65	2	4	0	8	0	28	2	105	4
Dumbarton	2026–27	Scottish League Two	0	0	0	0	1	0	1	0	2	0
Career total			254	7	10	0	25	2	36	3	325	12

== Honours ==
Dunfermline Athletic

- Scottish League One: 2015–16

Ross County

- Scottish Championship: 2018–19
- Scottish Challenge Cup: 2018–19

Hamilton Academical

- Scottish Challenge Cup: 2022–23

East Kilbride

- Lowland Football League (2): 2023–24, 2024–25
- Scottish League Two play-off winners: 2024–25
- Scottish League Two: 2025–26
- SFA South Region Challenge Cup (2): 2023–24, 2024–25
- Lowland League Cup: 2024–25
