= 2018–19 Scottish League Cup group stage =

2018–19 Scottish League Cup (group stage)
Tournament details
- Country: Scotland
- Dates: 14 July 2018 – 28 July 2018
- Teams: 40

Tournament statistics
- Matches played: 64
- Goals scored: 205 (3.2 per match)
- Top goal scorer(s): Stephen Dobbie; Lawrence Shankland (7 goals)

The 2018–19 Scottish League Cup group stage was played from 14–28 July 2018. A total of 40 teams competed in the group stage. The winners of each of the eight groups, as well as the four best runners-up progressed to the second round (last 16) of the 2018–19 Scottish League Cup.

== Format ==
The group stage consisted of eight groups of five teams. The four clubs competing in the Champions League (Celtic) and Europa League (Aberdeen, Hibernian and Rangers) qualifying rounds were given a bye through to the second round. The 40 teams competing in the group stage consisted of the other eight teams that competed in the 2017–18 Scottish Premiership, and all of the teams that competed in the 2017–18 Scottish Championship, 2017–18 Scottish League One and 2017–18 Scottish League Two, as well as the 2017–18 Highland Football League and the 2017–18 Lowland Football League champions. The teams were divided into two sections – North and South – with each section containing four top seeds, four second seeds and twelve unseeded teams. Each section was then drawn into four groups with each comprising one top seed, one second seed and three unseeded teams. The winners of each of the eight groups, as well as the four best runners-up progressed to the second round (last 16), which included the four UEFA qualifying clubs. At this stage, the competition reverted to the traditional knock-out format. The four group winners with the highest points total and the clubs entering at this stage were seeded, with the four group winners with the lowest points unseeded along with the four best runners-up.

The draw for the group stages took place on 25 May 2018 and was broadcast live on BT Sport 2. Seedings for the draw were confirmed two days in advance.

== Teams ==
=== North ===
==== Seeding ====
Teams in Bold qualified for the second round

| Top seeds | Second seeds | Unseeded |
|---|---|---|
| 01. **Heart of Midlothian**; 02. **St Johnstone**; 03. **Dundee**; 04. **Ross County** | 09. Dundee United; 10. **Dunfermline Athletic**; 11. Inverness CT; 12. Falkirk | 17. Brechin City; 18. Raith Rovers; 19. Alloa Athletic; 20. Arbroath; 21. East Fife; 22. Forfar Athletic; 23. Montrose; 24. Peterhead; 25. Stirling Albion; 26. Elgin City; 27. Cowdenbeath; 28. Cove Rangers |

=== South ===
==== Seeding ====
Teams in Bold qualified for the second round

| Top seeds | Second seeds | Unseeded |
|---|---|---|
| 05. **Kilmarnock**; 06. **Motherwell**; 07. Hamilton Academical; 08. **Partick Thistle** | 13. **St Mirren**; 14. **Livingston**; 15. **Queen of the South**; 16. Greenock Morton | 29. Dumbarton; 30. **Ayr United**; 31. Stranraer; 32. Airdrieonians; 33. Queen's Park; 34. Albion Rovers; 35. Stenhousemuir; 36. Clyde; 37. Annan Athletic; 38. Berwick Rangers; 39. Edinburgh City; 40. Spartans |

== North ==
=== Group A ===
| Pos | Team | Pld | W | PW | PL | L | GF | GA | GD | Pts | Qualification | ROS | ARB | ALO | DUN | ELG |
|---|---|---|---|---|---|---|---|---|---|---|---|---|---|---|---|---|
| 1 | Ross County (Q) | 4 | 3 | 0 | 0 | 1 | 6 | 4 | +2 | 9 | Qualification for the Second round | — | — | — | 1–0 | 2–0 |
| 2 | Arbroath | 4 | 2 | 1 | 0 | 1 | 9 | 6 | +3 | 8 | | 4–1 | — | — | — | 2–0 |
| 3 | Alloa Athletic | 4 | 2 | 1 | 0 | 1 | 8 | 5 | +3 | 8 | | 0–2 | 4–2 | — | — | — |
| 4 | Dundee United | 4 | 1 | 0 | 2 | 1 | 6 | 3 | +3 | 5 | | — | 1–1p | 1–1p | — | — |
| 5 | Elgin City | 4 | 0 | 0 | 0 | 4 | 0 | 11 | −11 | 0 | | — | — | 0–3 | 0–4 | — |

Rules for classification: 1) goal difference, 2) goals scored, 3) away goals scored, 4) matches won, 5) away matches won, 6) drawing of lots.
(Q) Qualified to the phase indicated

==== Matches ====
14 July 2018
15:00

| Dundee United | 1–1 | Arbroath |
|---|---|---|
| Clark 77' | | Linn 82' (pen.) |
Penalties
| Murdoch (penalty scored); Aird (penalty scored); McMullan (penalty scored); Chalmers (penalty missed) | 3–5 | (penalty scored) McKenna; (penalty scored) Whatley; (penalty scored) Wallace; (penalty scored) Little; (penalty scored) Linn |

Tannadice Park, Dundee
Attendance: 2,939
Referee: Bobby Madden
14 July 2018
15:00

| Ross County | 2–0 | Elgin City |
|---|---|---|
| McManus 61'; Mullin 82' |

Victoria Park, Dingwall
Attendance: 1,270
Referee: Alan Newlands
17 July 2018
19:45

| Alloa Athletic | 4–2 | Arbroath |
|---|---|---|
| Spence 9', 36'; Toshney 10' (o.g.); Trouten 30' | | Wallace 20'; Hester 26' |

Recreation Park, Alloa
Attendance: 302
Referee: Craig Napier
17 July 2018
19:45

| Ross County | 1–0 | Dundee United |
|---|---|---|
| Lindsay 85' |

Victoria Park, Dingwall
Attendance: 1,532
Referee: Willie Collum
21 July 2018
15:00

| Arbroath | 2–0 | Elgin City |
|---|---|---|
| Hamilton 52'; O'Brien 82' |

Gayfield Park, Arbroath
Attendance: 386
Referee: Graham Beaton
21 July 2018
15:00

| Dundee United | 1–1 | Alloa Athletic |
|---|---|---|
| Frans 24' | | Trouten 72' (pen.) |
Penalties
| Murdoch (penalty missed); Aird (penalty scored); Barton (penalty scored); Glass (penalty scored); McMullan (penalty missed) | 3–4 | (penalty scored) Taggart; (penalty scored) Spence; (penalty scored) Flannigan; (penalty scored) Trouten |

Tannadice Park, Dundee
Attendance: 1,659
Referee: Steven McLean
24 July 2018
19:45

| Elgin City | 0–3 | Alloa Athletic |
|---|---|---|
| | | Hastie 2', 53'; Trouten 11' |

Borough Briggs, Elgin
Attendance: 417
Referee: Scott Millar
25 July 2018
19:45

| Arbroath | 4–1 | Ross County |
|---|---|---|
| McKenna 43', 60' (pen.); Hamilton 73'; Hester 83' | | Mckay 23' |

Gayfield Park, Arbroath
Attendance: 496
Referee: Steven Kirkland
28 July 2018
15:00

| Alloa Athletic | 0–2 | Ross County |
|---|---|---|
| | | Morris 59'; Paton 90+2' |

Recreation Park, Alloa
Attendance: 431
Referee: Ryan Lee
28 July 2018
15:00

| Elgin City | 0–4 | Dundee United |
|---|---|---|
| | | Clark 66', 73'; Barton 81' (pen.); Glass 90+1' |

Borough Briggs, Elgin
Attendance: 1,104
Referee: John McKendrick

=== Group B ===
| Pos | Team | Pld | W | PW | PL | L | GF | GA | GD | Pts | Qualification | STJ | FAL | MON | FOR | EFI |
|---|---|---|---|---|---|---|---|---|---|---|---|---|---|---|---|---|
| 1 | St Johnstone (Q) | 4 | 3 | 1 | 0 | 0 | 5 | 1 | +4 | 11 | Qualification for the Second round | — | 1–0 | — | — | p0–0 |
| 2 | Falkirk | 4 | 2 | 0 | 0 | 2 | 4 | 3 | +1 | 6 | | — | — | 0–1 | 2–0 | — |
| 3 | Montrose | 4 | 2 | 0 | 0 | 2 | 3 | 4 | −1 | 6 | | 0–1 | — | — | — | 1–0 |
| 4 | Forfar Athletic | 4 | 1 | 1 | 0 | 2 | 5 | 7 | −2 | 5 | | 1–3 | — | 3–1 | — | — |
| 5 | East Fife | 4 | 0 | 0 | 2 | 2 | 2 | 4 | −2 | 2 | | — | 1–2 | — | 1–1p | — |

Rules for classification: 1) goal difference, 2) goals scored, 3) away goals scored, 4) matches won, 5) away matches won, 6) drawing of lots.
(Q) Qualified to the phase indicated

==== Matches ====
14 July 2018
15:00

| Falkirk | 0–1 | Montrose |
|---|---|---|
| | | Rennie 19' |

Falkirk Stadium, Falkirk
Attendance: 1,730
Referee: Graham Beaton
14 July 2018
15:00

| St Johnstone | 0–0 | East Fife |
Penalties
| Craig (penalty scored); Kane (penalty scored); Watt (penalty scored); Alston (penalty scored); Wright (penalty scored) | 5–4 | (penalty scored) Watson; (penalty scored) Court; (penalty scored) Slattery; (penalty scored) Davidson; (penalty missed) Thomson |

McDiarmid Park, Perth
Attendance: 1,687
Referee: Steven Kirkland
17 July 2018
19:45

| Falkirk | 2–0 | Forfar Athletic |
|---|---|---|
| Lewis 54'; Petravicius 82' |

Falkirk Stadium, Falkirk
Attendance: 1,429
Referee: Steven Kirkland
17 July 2018
19:45

| Montrose | 1–0 | East Fife |
|---|---|---|
| Cavanagh 56' |

Links Park, Montrose
Attendance: 466
Referee: Kevin Graham
21 July 2018
15:00

| Montrose | 0–1 | St Johnstone |
|---|---|---|
| | | Watt 34' |

Links Park, Montrose
Attendance: 1,160
Referee: Barry Cook
22 July 2018
15:00

| East Fife | 1–1 | Forfar Athletic |
|---|---|---|
| Meechan 7' (o.g.) | | Baird 45' |
Penalties
| Watson (penalty scored); Dunsmore (penalty scored); Long (penalty scored); Davidson (penalty missed); Dowds (penalty scored); Meggatt (penalty missed) | 4–5 | (penalty scored) Munro; (penalty missed) Baird; (penalty scored) Hilson; (penalty scored) Meechan; (penalty scored) Easton; (penalty scored) Reilly |

Bayview Stadium, Methil
Attendance: 420
Referee: Lloyd Wilson
24 July 2018
19:45

| St Johnstone | 1–0 | Falkirk |
|---|---|---|
| Scougall 31' |

McDiarmid Park, Perth
Attendance: 2,379
Referee: Craig Thomson
25 July 2018
19:45

| Forfar Athletic | 3–1 | Montrose |
|---|---|---|
| Easton 26' (pen.); Baird 28'; Hilson 66' | | Campbell 64' |

Station Park, Forfar
Attendance: 658
Referee: Gavin Ross
28 July 2018
15:00

| East Fife | 1–2 | Falkirk |
|---|---|---|
| Dowds 24' | | Mackin 49', 63' |

Bayview Stadium, Methil
Attendance: 670
Referee: Colin Steven
28 July 2018
15:00

| Forfar Athletic | 1–3 | St Johnstone |
|---|---|---|
| Baird 15' | | Watt 42'; McMillan 51'; Kennedy 62' |

Station Park, Forfar
Attendance: 1,087
Referee: Gavin Duncan

=== Group C ===
| Pos | Team | Pld | W | PW | PL | L | GF | GA | GD | Pts | Qualification | HOM | INV | COW | COV | RAI |
|---|---|---|---|---|---|---|---|---|---|---|---|---|---|---|---|---|
| 1 | Heart of Midlothian (Note: Heart of Midlothian were deducted two points for fielding an ineligible player against Cove Rangers on 18 July 2018.) (Q) | 4 | 3 | 1 | 0 | 0 | 13 | 2 | +11 | 9 | Qualification for the Second round | — | 5–0 | 5–0 | — | — |
| 2 | Inverness Caledonian Thistle | 4 | 3 | 0 | 0 | 1 | 9 | 8 | +1 | 9 | | — | — | — | 2–0 | 2–1 |
| 3 | Cowdenbeath | 4 | 2 | 0 | 0 | 2 | 5 | 10 | −5 | 6 | | — | 2–5 | — | 1–0 | — |
| 4 | Cove Rangers | 4 | 1 | 0 | 0 | 3 | 3 | 5 | −2 | 3 | | 1–2 | — | — | — | 2–0 |
| 5 | Raith Rovers | 4 | 0 | 0 | 1 | 3 | 2 | 7 | −5 | 1 | | 1–1p | — | 0–2 | — | — |

Rules for classification: 1) goal difference, 2) goals scored, 3) away goals scored, 4) matches won, 5) away matches won, 6) drawing of lots.
(Q) Qualified to the phase indicated

==== Matches ====
14 July 2018
15:00

| Inverness Caledonian Thistle | 2–0 | Cove Rangers |
|---|---|---|
| Austin 30', 41' |

Caledonian Stadium, Inverness
Attendance: 932
Referee: Grant Irvine
14 July 2018
15:00

| Raith Rovers | 0–2 | Cowdenbeath |
|---|---|---|
| | | Sheerin 53', 86' |

Bayview Stadium, Methil
Attendance: 634
Referee: Steven Reid
17 July 2018
19:45

| Cowdenbeath | 2–5 | Inverness Caledonian Thistle |
|---|---|---|
| Sheerin 53', 86' | | Walsh 34', 41'; Doran 45', 80'; Oakley 73' |

Central Park, Cowdenbeath
Attendance: 374
Referee: John McKendrick
18 July 2018
20:00

| Cove Rangers | 1–2 | Heart of Midlothian |
|---|---|---|
| McManus 75' | | Lee 11'; MacLean 57' |

Balmoral Stadium, Cove
Attendance: 1,728
Referee: Nick Walsh
21 July 2018
15:00

| Cowdenbeath | 1–0 | Cove Rangers |
|---|---|---|
| Cox 86' |

Central Park, Cowdenbeath
Attendance: 320
Referee: Gavin Duncan
21 July 2018
15:00

| Raith Rovers | 1–1 | Heart of Midlothian |
|---|---|---|
| Nisbet 51' | | M. Smith 78' |
Penalties
| Gillespie (penalty scored); Benedictus (penalty missed); Matthews (penalty missed); Murray (penalty scored) | 2–4 | (penalty scored) M. Smith; (penalty scored) Keena; (penalty missed) Lee; (penalty scored) Naismith; (penalty scored) Souttar |

Bayview Stadium, Methil
Attendance: 1,452
Referee: Don Robertson
24 July 2018
19:45

| Heart of Midlothian | 5–0 | Cowdenbeath |
|---|---|---|
| MacLean 48'; Ikpeazu 64'; Haring 73'; Naismith 75' (pen.); M. Smith 81' |

Tynecastle Park, Edinburgh
Attendance: 7,486
Referee: Barry Cook
24 July 2018
19:45

| Inverness Caledonian Thistle | 2–1 | Raith Rovers |
|---|---|---|
| Austin 49'; D. Mackay 87' | | Gillespie 61' |

Caledonian Stadium, Inverness
Attendance: 1,295
Referee: Colin Steven
28 July 2018
15:00

| Cove Rangers | 2–0 | Raith Rovers |
|---|---|---|
| Park 9'; Masson 76' |

Balmoral Stadium, Cove
Attendance: 327
Referee: Kevin Graham
29 July 2018
15:00

| Heart of Midlothian | 5–0 | Inverness Caledonian Thistle |
|---|---|---|
| Ikpeazu 29', 33'; Garuccio 32'; Naismith 64', 81' |

Tynecastle Park, Edinburgh
Attendance: 10,030
Referee: Willie Collum

=== Group D ===
| Pos | Team | Pld | W | PW | PL | L | GF | GA | GD | Pts | Qualification | DNF | DND | BRE | STI | PET |
|---|---|---|---|---|---|---|---|---|---|---|---|---|---|---|---|---|
| 1 | Dunfermline Athletic (Q) | 4 | 4 | 0 | 0 | 0 | 14 | 2 | +12 | 12 | Qualification for the Second round | — | — | — | 3–1 | 3–0 |
| 2 | Dundee (Q) | 4 | 3 | 0 | 0 | 1 | 8 | 1 | +7 | 9 | Qualification for the Second round | 0–1 | — | 2–0 | — | — |
| 3 | Brechin City | 4 | 1 | 0 | 1 | 2 | 3 | 10 | −7 | 4 | | 1–7 | — | — | — | 0–0p |
| 4 | Stirling Albion | 4 | 1 | 0 | 0 | 3 | 4 | 9 | −5 | 3 | | — | 0–4 | 1–2 | — | — |
| 5 | Peterhead | 4 | 0 | 1 | 0 | 3 | 0 | 7 | −7 | 2 | | — | 0–2 | — | 0–2 | — |

Rules for classification: 1) goal difference, 2) goals scored, 3) away goals scored, 4) matches won, 5) away matches won, 6) drawing of lots.
(Q) Qualified to the phase indicated

==== Matches ====
14 July 2018
15:00

| Brechin City | 0–0 | Peterhead |
Penalties
| Hill (penalty scored); Tapping (penalty scored); Burns (penalty scored); P. McLean (penalty missed); Shields (penalty scored); Morena (penalty missed) | 4–5 | (penalty scored) McAllister; (penalty scored) Leitch; (penalty missed) Gibson; (penalty scored) R. McLean; (penalty scored) Stevenson; (penalty scored) Brown |

Glebe Park, Brechin
Attendance: 301
Referee: David Dickinson
14 July 2018
15:00

| Stirling Albion | 0–4 | Dundee |
|---|---|---|
| | | Moussa 39', 57'; Mendy 63'; Wighton 69' |

Forthbank Stadium, Stirling
Attendance: 1,400
Referee: Gavin Ross
17 July 2018
19:45

| Dunfermline Athletic | 3–0 | Peterhead |
|---|---|---|
| Hippolyte 42'; Higginbotham 88' (pen.); Ryan 90+3' |

East End Park, Dunfermline
Attendance: 1,848
Referee: Steven McLean
17 July 2018
19:45

| Stirling Albion | 1–2 | Brechin City |
|---|---|---|
| Stewart 44' | | Melingui 17'; Tapping 84' |

Forthbank Stadium, Stirling
Attendance: 334
Referee: David Lowe
21 July 2018
15:00

| Peterhead | 0–2 | Stirling Albion |
|---|---|---|
| | | P. MacDonald 9'; Stewart 71' |

Balmoor Stadium, Peterhead
Attendance: 473
Referee: Peter Stuart
22 July 2018
15:00

| Dundee | 0–1 | Dunfermline Athletic |
|---|---|---|
| | | Longridge 2' |

Dens Park, Dundee
Attendance: 2,870
Referee: Bobby Madden
25 July 2018
19:45

| Brechin City | 1–7 | Dunfermline Athletic |
|---|---|---|
| Shields 60' | | Devine 7'; Longridge 10'; El Bakhtaoui 15', 43'; Ryan 57', 63'; Hippolyte 85' |

Glebe Park, Brechin
Attendance: 658
Referee: Alan Newlands
25 July 2018
19:45

| Peterhead | 0–2 | Dundee |
|---|---|---|
| | | Madianga 49'; Mendy 90+3' |

Balmoor Stadium, Peterhead
Attendance: 934
Referee: Euan Anderson
28 July 2018
15:00

| Dundee | 2–0 | Brechin City |
|---|---|---|
| Spence 11'; McGowan 59' |

Dens Park, Dundee
Attendance: 2,058
Referee: Kevin Clancy
28 July 2018
15:00

| Dunfermline Athletic | 3–1 | Stirling Albion |
|---|---|---|
| Hippolyte 47', 90+1'; Vincent 56' | | MacDonald 35' |

East End Park, Dunfermline
Attendance: 2,359
Referee: Mike Roncone

== South ==
=== Group E ===
| Pos | Team | Pld | W | PW | PL | L | GF | GA | GD | Pts | Qualification | AYR | PAR | GMO | STE | ALB |
|---|---|---|---|---|---|---|---|---|---|---|---|---|---|---|---|---|
| 1 | Ayr United (Q) | 4 | 4 | 0 | 0 | 0 | 12 | 1 | +11 | 12 | Qualification for the Second round | — | — | 3–1 | 5–0 | — |
| 2 | Partick Thistle (Q) | 4 | 3 | 0 | 0 | 1 | 6 | 3 | +3 | 9 | Qualification for the Second round | 0–2 | — | 2–1 | — | — |
| 3 | Greenock Morton | 4 | 2 | 0 | 0 | 2 | 9 | 5 | +4 | 6 | | — | — | — | 2–0 | 5–0 |
| 4 | Stenhousemuir | 4 | 1 | 0 | 0 | 3 | 4 | 9 | −5 | 3 | | — | 0–2 | — | — | 4–0 |
| 5 | Albion Rovers | 4 | 0 | 0 | 0 | 4 | 0 | 13 | −13 | 0 | | 0–2 | 0–2 | — | — | — |

Rules for classification: 1) goal difference, 2) goals scored, 3) away goals scored, 4) matches won, 5) away matches won, 6) drawing of lots.
(Q) Qualified to the phase indicated

==== Matches ====
14 July 2018
15:00

| Ayr United | 3–1 | Greenock Morton |
|---|---|---|
| Shankland 48', 72', 75' | | Tidser 14' |

Somerset Park, Ayr
Attendance: 1,586
Referee: Willie Collum
14 July 2018
15:00

| Stenhousemuir | 0–2 | Partick Thistle |
|---|---|---|
| | | Gordon 2', 6' |

Ochilview Park, Stenhousemuir
Attendance: 675
Referee: Gavin Duncan
17 July 2018
19:45

| Partick Thistle | 2–1 | Greenock Morton |
|---|---|---|
| Storer 17'; Penrice 29' | | Tumilty 74' |

Firhill Stadium, Glasgow
Attendance: 2,088
Referee: Kevin Clancy
17 July 2018
19:30

| Stenhousemuir | 4–0 | Albion Rovers |
|---|---|---|
| Neill 54'; Duthie 56'; Ross 85'; Dickson 90+1' |

Ochilview Park, Stenhousemuir
Attendance: 230
Referee: Lloyd Wilson
21 July 2018
15:00

| Albion Rovers | 0–2 | Ayr United |
|---|---|---|
| | | Forrest 15'; Bell 80' |

Cliftonhill, Coatbridge
Attendance: 519
Referee: Mike Roncone
21 July 2018
15:00

| Greenock Morton | 2–0 | Stenhousemuir |
|---|---|---|
| MacLean 33'; McHugh 41' |

Cappielow, Greenock
Attendance: 847
Referee: Colin Steven
24 July 2018
19:45

| Albion Rovers | 0–2 | Partick Thistle |
|---|---|---|
| | | Storey 59'; Fitzpatrick 83' |

Cliftonhill, Coatbridge
Attendance: 963
Referee: David Lowe
24 July 2018
19:45

| Ayr United | 5–0 | Stenhousemuir |
|---|---|---|
| Shankland 2', 8', 45'; Moffat 41', 86' |

Somerset Park, Ayr
Attendance: 1,227
Referee: David Munro
28 July 2018
15:00

| Greenock Morton | 5–0 | Albion Rovers |
|---|---|---|
| McHugh 36'; Bell 38'; Tidser 74' (pen.), 79'; Armour 75' |

Cappielow, Greenock
Attendance: 758
Referee: Steven Reid
28 July 2018
15:00

| Partick Thistle | 0–2 | Ayr United |
|---|---|---|
| | | Moffat 6'; Shankland 66' |

Firhill Stadium, Glasgow
Attendance: 2,871
Referee: Nick Walsh

=== Group F ===
| Pos | Team | Pld | W | PW | PL | L | GF | GA | GD | Pts | Qualification | LIV | AIR | HAM | ANN | BER |
|---|---|---|---|---|---|---|---|---|---|---|---|---|---|---|---|---|
| 1 | Livingston (Q) | 4 | 3 | 1 | 0 | 0 | 5 | 1 | +4 | 11 | Qualification for the Second round | — | — | — | 1–0 | 2–0 |
| 2 | Airdrieonians | 4 | 2 | 0 | 1 | 1 | 9 | 4 | +5 | 7 | | 1–2 | — | — | 4–1 | — |
| 3 | Hamilton Academical | 4 | 1 | 1 | 1 | 1 | 5 | 2 | +3 | 6 | | 0–0p | p1–1 | — | — | — |
| 4 | Annan Athletic | 4 | 2 | 0 | 0 | 2 | 6 | 5 | +1 | 6 | | — | — | 1–0 | — | 4–0 |
| 5 | Berwick Rangers | 4 | 0 | 0 | 0 | 4 | 0 | 10 | −10 | 0 | | — | 0–3 | 0–4 | — | — |

Rules for classification: 1) goal difference, 2) goals scored, 3) away goals scored, 4) matches won, 5) away matches won, 6) drawing of lots.
(Q) Qualified to the phase indicated

==== Matches ====
14 July 2018
15:00

| Airdrieonians | 1–2 | Livingston |
|---|---|---|
| Duffy 53' | | Pittman 24'; L. Miller 25' |

Excelsior Stadium, Airdrie
Attendance: 733
Referee: Nick Walsh
14 July 2018
15:00

| Annan Athletic | 1–0 | Hamilton Academical |
|---|---|---|
| Smith 60' |

Galabank, Annan
Attendance: 491
Referee: David Munro
17 July 2018
19:45

| Annan Athletic | 4–0 | Berwick Rangers |
|---|---|---|
| Muir 30', 42'; Wilson 48'; Roberts 52' |

Galabank, Annan
Attendance: 192
Referee: Duncan Williams
17 July 2018
19:45

| Hamilton Academical | 0–0 | Livingston |
Penalties
| Imrie (penalty scored); Bingham (penalty scored); Kelly (penalty scored); Penny (penalty scored); MacKinnon (penalty missed); Cunningham (penalty scored); McGowan (penalty missed); Lyon (penalty missed) | 5–6 | (penalty scored) Halkett; (penalty scored) Lamie; (penalty scored) Sibbald; (penalty missed) Robinson; (penalty scored) Hamilton; (penalty scored) Crane; (penalty missed) Gallagher; (penalty scored) McMillan |

New Douglas Park, Hamilton
Attendance: 1,012
Referee: John Beaton
21 July 2018
15:00

| Berwick Rangers | 0–3 | Airdrieonians |
|---|---|---|
| | | Crighton 21'; Duffy 36'; McIntosh 75' |

Shielfield Park, Berwick-upon-Tweed
Attendance: 389
Referee: Scott Millar
21 July 2018
15:00

| Livingston | 1–0 | Annan Athletic |
|---|---|---|
| K. Miller 14' |

Prestonfield, Linlithgow
Attendance: 678
Referee: Kevin Clancy
24 July 2018
19:45

| Airdrieonians | 4–1 | Annan Athletic |
|---|---|---|
| Crighton 38'; Conroy 54'; Duffy 56'; Carrick 88' | | Wilson 84' |

Excelsior Stadium, Airdrie
Attendance: 461
Referee: Grant Irvine
24 July 2018
19:45

| Berwick Rangers | 0–4 | Hamilton Academical |
|---|---|---|
| | | Miller 5', 29', 64' (pen.); Imrie 87' |

Shielfield Park, Berwick-upon-Tweed
Attendance: 336
Referee: Greg Aitken
28 July 2018
15:00

| Hamilton Academical | 1–1 | Airdrieonians |
|---|---|---|
| Bingham 62' | | Victoria 83' |
Penalties
| Phillips (penalty scored); Kelly (penalty scored); Bingham (penalty scored) | 3–0 | (penalty missed) Conroy; (penalty missed) Crighton; (penalty missed) Carrick |

New Douglas Park, Hamilton
Attendance: 1,316
Referee: Craig Thomson
28 July 2018
15:00

| Livingston | 2–0 | Berwick Rangers |
|---|---|---|
| Hamilton 3'; McMillan 82' |

Prestonfield, Linlithgow
Attendance: 552
Referee: Steven Kirkland

=== Group G ===
| Pos | Team | Pld | W | PW | PL | L | GF | GA | GD | Pts | Qualification | MOT | QOS | EDC | CLY | STR |
|---|---|---|---|---|---|---|---|---|---|---|---|---|---|---|---|---|
| 1 | Motherwell (Q) | 4 | 3 | 0 | 1 | 0 | 11 | 2 | +9 | 10 | Qualification for the Second round | — | 2–0 | 5–0 | — | — |
| 2 | Queen of the South (Q) | 4 | 3 | 0 | 0 | 1 | 12 | 5 | +7 | 9 | Qualification for the Second round | — | — | — | 3–0 | 5–3 |
| 3 | Edinburgh City | 4 | 1 | 1 | 0 | 2 | 5 | 12 | −7 | 5 | | — | 0–4 | — | — | 4–2 |
| 4 | Clyde | 4 | 1 | 0 | 1 | 2 | 5 | 8 | −3 | 4 | | 1–3 | — | 1–1p | — | — |
| 5 | Stranraer | 4 | 0 | 1 | 0 | 3 | 7 | 13 | −6 | 2 | | p1–1 | — | — | 1–3 | — |

Rules for classification: 1) goal difference, 2) goals scored, 3) away goals scored, 4) matches won, 5) away matches won, 6) drawing of lots.
(Q) Qualified to the phase indicated

==== Matches ====
14 July 2018
15:00

| Clyde | 1–1 | Edinburgh City |
|---|---|---|
| McNiff 90+5' | | Balatoni 44' |
Penalties
| Goodwillie (penalty scored); Ferns (penalty missed); Grant (penalty missed) | 1–4 | (penalty scored) Laird; (penalty scored) McIntyre; (penalty scored) Donaldson; (penalty scored) Thomson |

Broadwood Stadium, Cumbernauld
Attendance: 407
Referee: Scott Lambie
14 July 2018
15:00

| Queen of the South | 5–3 | Stranraer |
|---|---|---|
| Harkins 41'; Dobbie 42', 87'; Dykes 44'; Stirling 64' | | McGowan 4'; Donnelly 9'; Turner 80' |

Palmerston Park, Dumfries
Attendance: 803
Referee: John Beaton
17 July 2018
19:45

| Motherwell | 5–0 | Edinburgh City |
|---|---|---|
| Frear 8', 24', 28'; Tait 18'; Main 44' |

Fir Park, Motherwell
Attendance: 2,749
Referee: Gavin Duncan
17 July 2018
19:45

| Queen of the South | 3–0 | Clyde |
|---|---|---|
| Dobbie 46', 49', 78' |

Palmerston Park, Dumfries
Attendance: 788
Referee: David Munro
21 July 2018
15:00

| Edinburgh City | 0–4 | Queen of the South |
|---|---|---|
| | | Dykes 24'; Dobbie 26', 38'; Todd 34' |

Ainslie Park, Edinburgh
Attendance: 525
Referee: Craig Napier
21 July 2018
15:00

| Stranraer | 1–1 | Motherwell |
|---|---|---|
| Layne 59' | | Hartley 38' |
Penalties
| Layne (penalty missed); Cummins (penalty scored); McGowan (penalty scored); Turner (penalty missed); Lamont (penalty missed); McDonald (penalty scored) | 3–2 | (penalty missed) Main; (penalty scored) Cadden; (penalty missed) Tait; (penalty scored) Bowman; (penalty missed) Frear; (penalty missed) Rose |

Stair Park, Stranraer
Attendance: 885
Referee: Euan Anderson
24 July 2018
19:45

| Motherwell | 2–0 | Queen of the South |
|---|---|---|
| Sammon 12', 37' |

Fir Park, Motherwell
Attendance: 3,337
Referee: Don Robertson
24 July 2018
19:45

| Stranraer | 1–3 | Clyde |
|---|---|---|
| Anderson 56' | | Goodwillie 2', 22'; McNiff 31' |

Stair Park, Stranraer
Attendance: 382
Referee: Steven Reid
28 July 2018
15:00

| Clyde | 1–3 | Motherwell |
|---|---|---|
| Goodwillie 31' | | Main 76'; Johnson 79'; Sammon 90+1' |

Broadwood Stadium, Cumbernauld
Attendance: 1,620
Referee: John Beaton
28 July 2018
15:00

| Edinburgh City | 4–2 | Stranraer |
|---|---|---|
| McIntyre 7'; Rodger 33'; Thomson 55'; Henderson 79' | | Cummins 23'; Anderson 35' |

Ainslie Park, Edinburgh
Attendance: 236
Referee: David Dickinson

=== Group H ===
| Pos | Team | Pld | W | PW | PL | L | GF | GA | GD | Pts | Qualification | KIL | STM | DUM | QPA | SPA |
|---|---|---|---|---|---|---|---|---|---|---|---|---|---|---|---|---|
| 1 | Kilmarnock (Q) | 4 | 3 | 0 | 1 | 0 | 9 | 2 | +7 | 10 | Qualification for the Second round | — | 0–0p | — | 2–0 | — |
| 2 | St Mirren (Q) | 4 | 1 | 3 | 0 | 0 | 8 | 2 | +6 | 9 | Qualification for the Second round | — | — | 6–0 | — | p2–2 |
| 3 | Dumbarton | 4 | 1 | 1 | 0 | 2 | 3 | 10 | −7 | 5 | | 2–4 | — | — | 1–0 | — |
| 4 | Queen's Park | 4 | 1 | 0 | 1 | 2 | 2 | 4 | −2 | 4 | | — | 0–0p | — | — | 2–1 |
| 5 | Spartans | 4 | 0 | 0 | 2 | 2 | 3 | 7 | −4 | 2 | | 0–3 | — | 0–0p | — | — |

Rules for classification: 1) goal difference, 2) goals scored, 3) away goals scored, 4) matches won, 5) away matches won, 6) drawing of lots.
(Q) Qualified to the phase indicated

==== Matches ====
13 July 2018
19:45

| Kilmarnock | 0–0 | St Mirren |
Penalties
| Erwin (penalty missed); Dicker (penalty missed); Burke (penalty scored); Broadfoot (penalty missed); Millen (penalty scored) | 2–3 | (penalty missed) S. McGinn; (penalty scored) P. McGinn; (penalty missed) King; (penalty scored) Coulson; (penalty scored) Mullen |

Rugby Park, Kilmarnock
Attendance: 4,026
Referee: Steven McLean
14 July 2018
15:00

| Spartans | 0–0 | Dumbarton |
Penalties
| Stevenson (penalty scored); Corbett (penalty scored); McFarland (penalty missed); Maxwell (penalty scored); Dishington (penalty missed) | 3–4 | (penalty scored) C. Barr; (penalty scored) Paton; (penalty scored) Gallagher; (penalty scored) Hutton |

Ainslie Park, Edinburgh
Attendance: 245
Referee: Stephen Brown
17 July 2018
19:45

| Dumbarton | 1–0 | Queen's Park |
|---|---|---|
| Gallagher 35' |

Dumbarton Football Stadium, Dumbarton
Attendance: 425
Referee: Gavin Ross
17 July 2018
19:45

| St Mirren | 2–2 | Spartans |
|---|---|---|
| S. McGinn 59'; Mullen 75' (pen.) | | Stevens 6'; Maxwell 55' |
Penalties
| Stewart (penalty scored); P. McGinn (penalty scored); Flynn (penalty scored); Mullen (penalty scored); Smith (penalty scored) | 5–3 | (penalty scored) Greenhill; (penalty missed) Atkinson; (penalty scored) Girdwood; (penalty scored) Herd |

St Mirren Park, Paisley
Attendance: 1,430
Referee: Alan Newlands
21 July 2018
15:00

| Dumbarton | 2–4 | Kilmarnock |
|---|---|---|
| C. Barr 41'; B. Barr 65' | | Ndjoli 48'; Boyd 68', 76', 90' |

Dumbarton Football Stadium, Dumbarton
Attendance: 1,353
Referee: Craig Thomson
21 July 2018
15:00

| Queen's Park | 2–1 | Spartans |
|---|---|---|
| Gibson 55'; Roberts 70' | | Dishington 52' |

Hampden Park, Glasgow
Attendance: 508
Referee: Duncan Smith
24 July 2018
19:45

| Queen's Park | 0–0 | St Mirren |
Penalties
| McKernon (penalty missed); Gibson (penalty scored); Mortimer (penalty scored); Peters (penalty scored); McGrory (penalty scored); Summers (penalty missed); Sharpe (penalty missed) | 4–5 | (penalty scored) Stewart; (penalty scored) P. McGinn; (penalty scored) Magennis; (penalty missed) Mullen; (penalty scored) S. McGinn; (penalty missed) Coulson; (penalty scored) Flynn |

Hampden Park, Glasgow
Attendance: 1,493
Referee: Nick Walsh
24 July 2018
19:45

| Spartans | 0–3 | Kilmarnock |
|---|---|---|
| | | Erwin 63'; Ndjoli 80', 90' |

Ainslie Park, Edinburgh
Attendance: 1,078
Referee: Mike Roncone
28 July 2018
15:00

| Kilmarnock | 2–0 | Queen's Park |
|---|---|---|
| Brophy 62'; Boyd 90+3' (pen.) |

Rugby Park, Kilmarnock
Attendance: 2,835
Referee: Barry Cook
28 July 2018
15:00

| St Mirren | 6–0 | Dumbarton |
|---|---|---|
| Coulson 1'; Smith 35', 84'; Stewart 48'; McGinn 53'; Kellerman 82' |

St Mirren Park, Paisley
Attendance: 1,610
Referee: Euan Anderson

== Best runners-up ==
| Pos | Grp | Team | Pld | W | PW | PL | L | GF | GA | GD | Pts | Qualification |
|---|---|---|---|---|---|---|---|---|---|---|---|---|
| 1 | G | Queen of the South (Q) | 4 | 3 | 0 | 0 | 1 | 12 | 5 | +7 | 9 | Qualification for the Second round |
| 2 | D | Dundee (Q) | 4 | 3 | 0 | 0 | 1 | 8 | 1 | +7 | 9 | Qualification for the Second round |
| 3 | H | St Mirren (Q) | 4 | 1 | 3 | 0 | 0 | 8 | 2 | +6 | 9 | Qualification for the Second round |
| 4 | E | Partick Thistle (Q) | 4 | 3 | 0 | 0 | 1 | 6 | 3 | +3 | 9 | Qualification for the Second round |
| 5 | C | Inverness Caledonian Thistle | 4 | 3 | 0 | 0 | 1 | 9 | 8 | +1 | 9 | |
| 6 | A | Arbroath | 4 | 2 | 1 | 0 | 1 | 9 | 6 | +3 | 8 | |
| 7 | F | Airdrieonians | 4 | 2 | 0 | 1 | 1 | 9 | 4 | +5 | 7 | |
| 8 | B | Falkirk | 4 | 2 | 0 | 0 | 2 | 4 | 3 | +1 | 6 | |

Rules for classification: 1) goal difference, 2) goals scored, 3) away goals scored, 4) matches won, 5) away matches won, 6) drawing of lots.
(Q) Qualified to the phase indicated

== Qualified teams ==
| Team | Qualified as | Qualified on | Notes |
|---|---|---|---|
| Ross County | Group A Winner | | |
| St Johnstone | Group B Winner | | Seeded in Round 2 draw |
| Heart of Midlothian | Group C Winner | | |
| Dunfermline Athletic | Group D Winner | | Seeded in Round 2 draw |
| Ayr United | Group E Winner | | Seeded in Round 2 draw |
| Livingston | Group F Winner | | Seeded in Round 2 draw |
| Motherwell | Group G Winner | | |
| Kilmarnock | Group H Winner | | |
| Queen of the South | Best 4 Runners Up | | |
| Dundee | Best 4 Runners Up | | |
| St Mirren | Best 4 Runners Up | | |
| Partick Thistle | Best 4 Runners Up | | |

== Top goalscorers ==
As of matches played on 29 July 2018

| Rank | Player | Club | Goals |
|---|---|---|---|
| 1 | (Scotland) Lawrence Shankland | Ayr United | 7 |
| 1 | (Scotland) Stephen Dobbie | Queen of the South | 7 |
| 3 | (Scotland) Jordyn Sheerin | Cowdenbeath | 4 |
| 3 | (England) Myles Hippolyte | Dunfermline Athletic | 4 |
| 3 | (Scotland) Kris Boyd | Kilmarnock | 4 |
| 6 | 15 players | | 3 |
