= 2022–23 South Challenge Cup =

SFA South Region Challenge Cup

Tournament details
- Country: Scotland; England (2 teams)
- Dates: 20 August 2022 – 28 May 2023
- Teams: 163

Final positions
- Champions: The Spartans
- Runners-up: Drumchapel United

Tournament statistics
- Matches played: 162
- All statistics correct as of 19 August 2021.

The 2022–23 SFA South Region Challenge Cup was the 16th edition of the annual knockout cup competition for senior non-league clubs in the central and southern regions of Scotland. The tournament entry increased from 161 to a record 163 teams thanks to additional clubs joining the West of Scotland Football League.

The defending champions were Auchinleck Talbot of the West of Scotland League, who beat Lowland League champions Bonnyrigg Rose Athletic 3–1 in the final on 22 May 2022. However they went out of the competition at the quarter-final stage, losing 2–1 to Caledonian Braves.

The Spartans lifted the trophy for a record fourth time, completing a league and cup double after also winning the Lowland League. They beat Drumchapel United 2–1 in the final.

== Format ==
The South Challenge Cup features 163 senior non-league clubs from the Lowland Football League (16), East of Scotland Football League (59), South of Scotland Football League (10), and West of Scotland Football League (79). The reserve teams of Stirling University, Caledonian Braves, and Stranraer, as well as Celtic B, Heart of Midlothian B, and Rangers B, do not take part. Newburgh were debarred due to a breach of rules.

The first and second rounds were regionalised, with north-east, south-east, south-west, and north-west sections each containing 40 or 41 clubs.

The draws are unseeded, with matches proceeding to extra time and penalties if they were tied after 90 minutes.

== Calendar ==
Round	Main date	Fixtures	Clubs
First Round	20 August 2022	35	163 → 128
Second Round	~~10 September 2022~~; 15 October 2022	64	128 → 64
Third Round	~~15 October 2022~~; 19 November 2022	32	64 → 32
Fourth Round	4 February 2023	16	32 → 16
Fifth Round	4 March 2023	8	16 → 8
Quarter-Finals	1 April 2023	4	8 → 4
Semi-Finals	TBC	2	4 → 2
Final	28 May 2023	1	2 → 1

== First round ==
The draw for the regionalised first and second rounds took place on Sunday 26 June 2022. Each zone features 9 fixtures in the first round with 23 clubs receiving a bye to the second round (except the South-West zone featuring 8 matches and 24 byes).

=== North-East zone ===
20 August 2022	Camelon Juniors	4–2	West Park United
14:30

20 August 2022	Cowdenbeath	0–2	Cumbernauld Colts
15:00

20 August 2022	Crossgates Primrose	1–3	University of Stirling
14:30

20 August 2022	East Stirlingshire	2–0	Kirkcaldy & Dysart
15:00

20 August 2022	Glenrothes	1–0	Broomhill
14:30

20 August 2022	Kilsyth Rangers	1–5	Hill of Beath Hawthron
14:00				Attendance: 113

20 August 2022	Luncarty	2–3 (a.e.t.)	Kirkintilloch Rob Roy
14:30

20 August 2022	Rosyth	0–3	Gartcairn
14:30

20 August 2022	Shotts Bon Accord	6–0	Burntisland Shipyard
14:00

=== North-West zone ===
19 August 2022	Greenock Juniors	0–3	Thorn Athletic	Greenock
19:30				Stadium: Ravenscraig Stadium

20 August 2022	Ardrossan Winton Rovers	0–2	St Roch's	Ardrossan
14:00				Stadium: Winton Park

20 August 2022	Beith Juniors	8–1	St Anthony's	Beith
14:00				Stadium: Bellsdale Park

20 August 2022	Benburb	–	Dalry Thistle	Govan, Glasgow
14:00				Stadium: New Tinto Park

20 August 2022	Maryhill	3–1	Port Glasgow
14:00

20 August 2022	Pollok	6–0	Eglinton
14:00

20 August 2022	Rutherglen Glencairn	4–0	Finnart
14:00

20 August 2022	St Peter's	1–3	Renfrew	Renfrew
14:00				Stadium: New Western Park

20 August 2022	Vale of Leven	2–4	Largs Thistle
14:00

== Second round ==
=== North-West zone ===
15 October 2022	Ardeer Thistle	0–3	Glasgow United
14:00

15 October 2022	Arthurlie	0–3	Irvine Meadow XI
14:00

15 October 2022	Ashfield	2–0	Thorn Athletic	Glasgow
14:00				Stadium: Saracen Park

15 October 2022	Beith Juniors	3–4	Largs Thistle	Beith
14:00				Stadium: Bellsdale Park

15 October 2022	Benburb	1–4	Rutherglen Glencairn	Govan, Glasgow
14:00				Stadium: New Tinto Park

15 October 2022	Glasgow Perthshire	1–5	Kilwinning Rangers	Glasgow
14:00

== Third round ==
The majority of the third round ties took place on the weekend of 19 November 2022, reverting to an open draw with 32 fixtures being played.

18 November 2022	Leith Athletic	1–2	Fauldhouse United
20:00

18 November 2022	Rossvale	3–1	Johnstone Burgh
19:30

18 November 2022	Yoker Athletic	0–2	Drumchapel United
19:30

19 November 2022	Abbey Vale	0–1	East Kilbride
13:30

19 November 2022	Auchinleck Talbot	3–0	Neilston
14:00

19 November 2022	Bo'ness United	5–2	Penicuik Athletic
15:00

19 November 2022	Caledonian Braves	4–1	Rutherglen Glencairn	Motherwell
15:00				Stadium: Alliance Park

19 November 2022	Cambuslang Rangers	0–1	Newton Stewart
13:30

19 November 2022	Clydebank	4–0	Largs Thistle
14:00

19 November 2022	Coldstream	1–4	Broxburn Athletic
14:30

19 November 2022	Dunipace	2–1 (a.e.t.)	Tynecastle
14:30

19 November 2022	Edinburgh South	0–5	St Cadoc's
13:30				Attendance: 70

19 November 2022	Gartcairn	3–1	Dunbar United
13:30

19 November 2022	Glasgow United	0–6	Sauchie Juniors
13:30

19 November 2022	Glenafton Athletic	1–0	Kinnoull
13:30

19 November 2022	Inverkeithing Hillfield Swifts	3–6	Bo'ness Athletic
14:00

19 November 2022	Jeanfield Swifts	1–2	Lochar Thistle
14:30

19 November 2022	Kilwinning Rangers	3–2	Musselburgh Athletic
13:30

19 November 2022	Linlithgow Rose	3–1	Civil Service Strollers
14:30

19 November 2022	Maryhill	2–1	Ashfield
13:30

19 November 2022	Maybole Juniors	5–0	Glenrothes
13:30

19 November 2022	Newtongrange Star	5–3 (a.e.t.)	Stoneyburn
14:30

19 November 2022	Renfrew	2–3	Cumnock Juniors
13:30

19 November 2022	The Spartans	9–0	Glasgow University
15:00

19 November 2022	Tranent Juniors	3–2	Blackburn United
15:00

19 November 2022	Troon	6–0	St Cuthbert Wanderers	Troon
13:30				Stadium: Portland Park

19 November 2022	Vale of Clyde	2–1	Irvine Meadow XI
13:30

20 November 2022	Lothian Thistle Hutchison Vale	3–1	Kello Rovers	Edinburgh
15:30

20 November 2022	University of Stirling	2–2 (a.e.t.) (4–2 p)	Darvel	Stirling
15:00				Stadium: Forthbank

28 January 2023	Luncarty	3–4	Thornton Hibs
13:30

1 February 2023	Threave Rovers	2–1	Whitletts Victoria
19:30

4 February 2023	Shotts Bon Accord	0–4	Dundonald Bluebell	Dalgety Bay
13:30				Stadium: Dalgety Bay Sports & Leisure Centre

== Fourth round ==
=== Draw ===
Lowland League	East of Scotland League	South of Scotland League	West of Scotland League
Bo'ness United; Caledonian Braves; East Kilbride; The Spartans; Tranent Juniors; University of Stirling	Premier Division: Broxburn Athletic; Dundonald Bluebell; Linlithgow Rose; Lothian Thistle Hutchison Vale; Sauchie Juniors; First Division: Dunipace; Newtongrange Star; Second Division: Thornton Hibs; Third Division: Bo'ness Athletic; Fauldhouse United	Lochar Thistle; Newton Stewart	Premier Division: Auchinleck Talbot; Clydebank; Cumnock Juniors; Glenafton Athletic; Kilwinning Rangers; Troon; First Division: Drumchapel United; Gartcairn; Rossvale; St Cadoc's; Second Division: Maryhill; Maybole Juniors; Third Division: Vale of Clyde; Fourth Division: Threave Rovers

=== Matches ===
4 February 2023	Auchinleck Talbot	7–0	Broxburn Athletic	Auchinleck
14:00				Stadium: Beechwood Park

4 February 2023	Caledonian Braves	4–3 (a.e.t.)	Bo'ness United	Motherwell
15:00				Stadium: Alliance Park

4 February 2023	Cumnock Juniors	4–2 (a.e.t.)	Troon	Cumnock
14:00				Stadium: Townhead Park

4 February 2023	Fauldhouse United	0–5	Sauchie Juniors	Fauldhouse
14:00				Stadium: Park View

4 February 2023	Gartcairn	4–3 (a.e.t.)	Bo'ness Athletic	Airdrie
14:00				Stadium: MTC Park

4 February 2023	Glenafton Athletic	2–3	Drumchapel United	New Cumnock
13:30				Stadium: Loch Park

4 February 2023	Kilwinning Rangers	3–0	Lothian Thistle Hutchison Vale	Kilwinning
13:30				Stadium: Buffs Park

4 February 2023	Lochar Thistle	1–4	Maryhill	Dumfries
13:30				Stadium: Wilson Park

4 February 2023	Maybole Juniors	0–1	Clydebank	Maybole
13:30				Stadium: Ladywell Stadium

4 February 2023	Newton Stewart	1–5	University of Stirling	Newton Stewart
15:00				Stadium: Blairmount Park

4 February 2023	Rossvale	1–5	East Kilbride	Glasgow
13:30				Stadium: Petershill Park

4 February 2023	The Spartans	5–0	Dunipace	Edinburgh
15:00				Stadium: Ainslie Park

4 February 2023	Threave Rovers	3–1	St Cadoc's	Castle Douglas
13:30				Stadium: Meadow Park

4 February 2023	Tranent Juniors	3–1	Linlithgow Rose	Tranent
15:00				Stadium: Foresters Park

4 February 2023	Vale of Clyde	1–0	Thornton Hibs	Glasgow
13:30				Stadium: Fullarton Park

14 February 2023	Newtongrange Star	0–2	Dundonald Bluebell	Newtongrange
19:30				Stadium: Victoria Park

== Fifth round ==
=== Draw ===
The draw for the fifth round was made on 6 February 2023, live on the West of Scotland Football League YouTube channel.

Teams in Italics were unknown at the time of the draw.

Lowland League	East of Scotland League	West of Scotland League
Caledonian Braves; East Kilbride; The Spartans; Tranent Juniors; University of Stirling	Premier Division: Dundonald Bluebell; Sauchie Juniors	Premier Division: Auchinleck Talbot; Clydebank; Cumnock Juniors; Kilwinning Rangers; First Division: Drumchapel United; Gartcairn; Second Division: Maryhill; Third Division: Vale of Clyde; Fourth Division: Threave Rovers

=== Matches ===
4 March 2023	Auchinleck Talbot	1–0	East Kilbride	Auchinleck
14:00				Stadium: Beechwood Park

4 March 2023	Clydebank	1–2	University of Stirling	Clydebank
15:00				Stadium: Holm Park

4 March 2023	Cumnock Juniors	2–3 (a.e.t.)	Sauchie Juniors	Cumnock
14:00				Stadium: Townhead Park

4 March 2023	Drumchapel United	3–2	Vale of Clyde	Drumchapel
14:00

4 March 2023	Dundonald Bluebell	2–2 (a.e.t.) (2–4 p)	The Spartans	Cardenden
14:30				Stadium: Moorside Park

4 March 2023	Gartcairn	2–1	Tranent Juniors	Airdrie
14:00				Stadium: MTC Park

4 March 2023	Maryhill	0–2	Kilwinning Rangers	Glasgow
14:00				Stadium: Lochburn Park

4 March 2023	Threave Rovers	0–2	Caledonian Braves	Castle Douglas
14:00				Stadium: Meadow Park

== Quarter-finals ==
=== Draw ===
Lowland League	East of Scotland League	West of Scotland League
Caledonian Braves; The Spartans; University of Stirling	Premier Division: Sauchie Juniors	Premier Division: Auchinleck Talbot; Kilwinning Rangers; First Division: Drumchapel United; Gartcairn

=== Matches ===
4 April 2023	Caledonian Braves	2–1	Auchinleck Talbot	Motherwell
15:00				Stadium: Alliance Park

4 April 2023	Kilwinning Rangers	1–4	Gartcairn	Kilwinning
14:00				Stadium: Buffs Park

4 April 2023	Sauchie Juniors	1–4	Drumchapel United	Sauchie
14:30				Stadium: Beechwood Park

4 April 2023	The Spartans	4–2	University of Stirling	Edinburgh
15:00				Stadium: Ainslie Park

== Semi-finals ==
=== Draw ===
Lowland League	West of Scotland League
Caledonian Braves; The Spartans	First Division: Drumchapel United; Gartcairn

=== Matches ===
18 April 2023	Caledonian Braves	2–3	The Spartans	Motherwell
19:45				Stadium: Alliance Park

26 April 2023	Gartcairn	0–1	Drumchapel United	Airdrie
19:45				Stadium: MTC Park

== Final ==
28 May 2023
14:00

The Spartans	2–1	Drumchapel United
Russell 17', 42'		Finnigan 87'

Broadwood Stadium, Cumbernauld
Referee: Greg Soutar
