= SFA North and South Region Challenge Cups =

Association football competition in Scotland

The North and South Region Challenge Cups are regional senior non-league competitions run by the Scottish Football Association. The southern tournament is open to full member non-league clubs in the south of the country, while similar stipulations applied to its northern counterpart.

== History ==
The Challenge Cup competitions replaced the Scottish Qualifying Cup North and South competitions in 2007, after the SFA decided to allow full member clubs at non-league level direct entry to the Scottish Cup proper, and as a consequence the Qualifying Cups were scrapped. To compensate clubs for the demise of the tournaments, two new ones were put in their place.

== North ==
SFA North Region Challenge Cup
- Founded: 2007
- Abolished: 2009
- Most championships: Huntly, Inverurie Locos (1 title each)

The North competition was scrapped in 2009.

=== Finals ===
Season	Winner	Score	Runner-up	Ref
2007–08	Huntly	1–0	Deveronvale	
2008–09	Inverurie Locos	3–1	Cove Rangers	

== South ==
SFA South Region Challenge Cup
- Founded: 2007
- Teams: 163
- Current champions: Cumnock Juniors (1st title)
- Most championships: East Kilbride (5 titles)
- Website: southchallengecup.com
- 2026–27 South Challenge Cup

The South Challenge Cup features 163 senior non-league clubs from the Lowland Football League (16), East of Scotland Football League (57), South of Scotland Football League (11), and West of Scotland Football League (79).

The reserve teams of Stirling University and Stranraer, as well as Celtic B and Hearts B, do not take part. It is an unseeded straight knock-out tournament, without replays. It is currently an all-in draw from the start, having previously seen the opening rounds regionalised at times during the competition's history.

The competition is named the Pyramid Live South Challenge Cup for sponsorship reasons in 2026–27.

=== Finals ===
- (aet) = Result after extra time.
- **Bold** = Winning team were also champions of their league

Season	Winner	Score	Runner-up	Venue	Ref
2007–08	Annan Athletic	3–2	Edinburgh City	Netherdale, Galashiels	
2008–09	**The Spartans**	6–0	Edinburgh University	Meadowbank Stadium, Edinburgh	
2009–10	**The Spartans (2)**	3–1	Gretna 2008	Tynecastle Stadium, Edinburgh	
2010–11	**The Spartans (3)**	3–0	Edinburgh City	Tynecastle Stadium, Edinburgh	
2011–12	**Stirling University**	4–2	Duns	Netherdale, Galashiels	
2012–13	**Whitehill Welfare**	3–1	Dalbeattie Star	Galabank, Annan	
2013–14	East Kilbride	2–0	Dalbeattie Star	Palmerston Park, Dumfries	
2014–15	BSC Glasgow	2–0	Civil Service Strollers	Ferguson Park, Rosewell	
2015–16	Whitehill Welfare (2)	2–2 aet 3–2 pen.	Edinburgh City	East Peffermill, Edinburgh	
2016–17	East Kilbride (2)	4–2	Cumbernauld Colts	Falkirk Stadium, Falkirk	
2017–18	Civil Service Strollers	2–1 aet	BSC Glasgow	Olivebank Stadium, Musselburgh	
2018–19	**East Kilbride (3)**	2–1	Bonnyrigg Rose Athletic	Meggetland Stadium, Edinburgh	
2019–20	Dunipace	3–1	Broomhill	Prestonfield, Linlithgow	
2020–21	Competition postponed at the third round stage due to the COVID-19 pandemic and later cancelled.				
2021–22	Auchinleck Talbot	3–1	Bonnyrigg Rose Athletic	Falkirk Stadium, Falkirk	
2022–23	**The Spartans (4)**	2–1	Drumchapel United	Broadwood Stadium, Cumbernauld	
2023–24	**East Kilbride (4)**	2–0	Kirkintilloch Rob Roy	Broadwood Stadium, Cumbernauld	
2024–25	**East Kilbride (5)**	2–0	Auchinleck Talbot	Broadwood Stadium, Cumbernauld	
2025–26	Cumnock Juniors	2–0	University of Stirling	Broadwood Stadium, Cumbernauld	

=== Performance by club ===
As of after 2025–26. Clubs no longer competing are marked in italics.

Club	Wins	Last win	Runners-up	Last final lost
East Kilbride	5	2025	—	—
The Spartans	4	2023	—	—
Whitehill Welfare	2	2016	—	—
BSC Glasgow / Broomhill	1	2015	2	2020
Civil Service Strollers	1	2018	1	2015
Annan Athletic	1	2008	—	—
University of Stirling	1	2012	1	2026
Dunipace	1	2020	—	—
Auchinleck Talbot	1	2022	1	2025
Cumnock Juniors	1	2026	—	
Edinburgh City	—	—	3	2016
Dalbeattie Star	—	—	2	2014
Bonnyrigg Rose Athletic	—	—	2	2022
Edinburgh University	—	—	1	2009
Gretna 2008	—	—	1	2010
Duns	—	—	1	2012
Cumbernauld Colts	—	—	1	2017
Drumchapel United	—	—	1	2023
Kirkintilloch Rob Roy	—	—	1	2024
