= Andy Ryan =

Scottish footballer (born 1994)

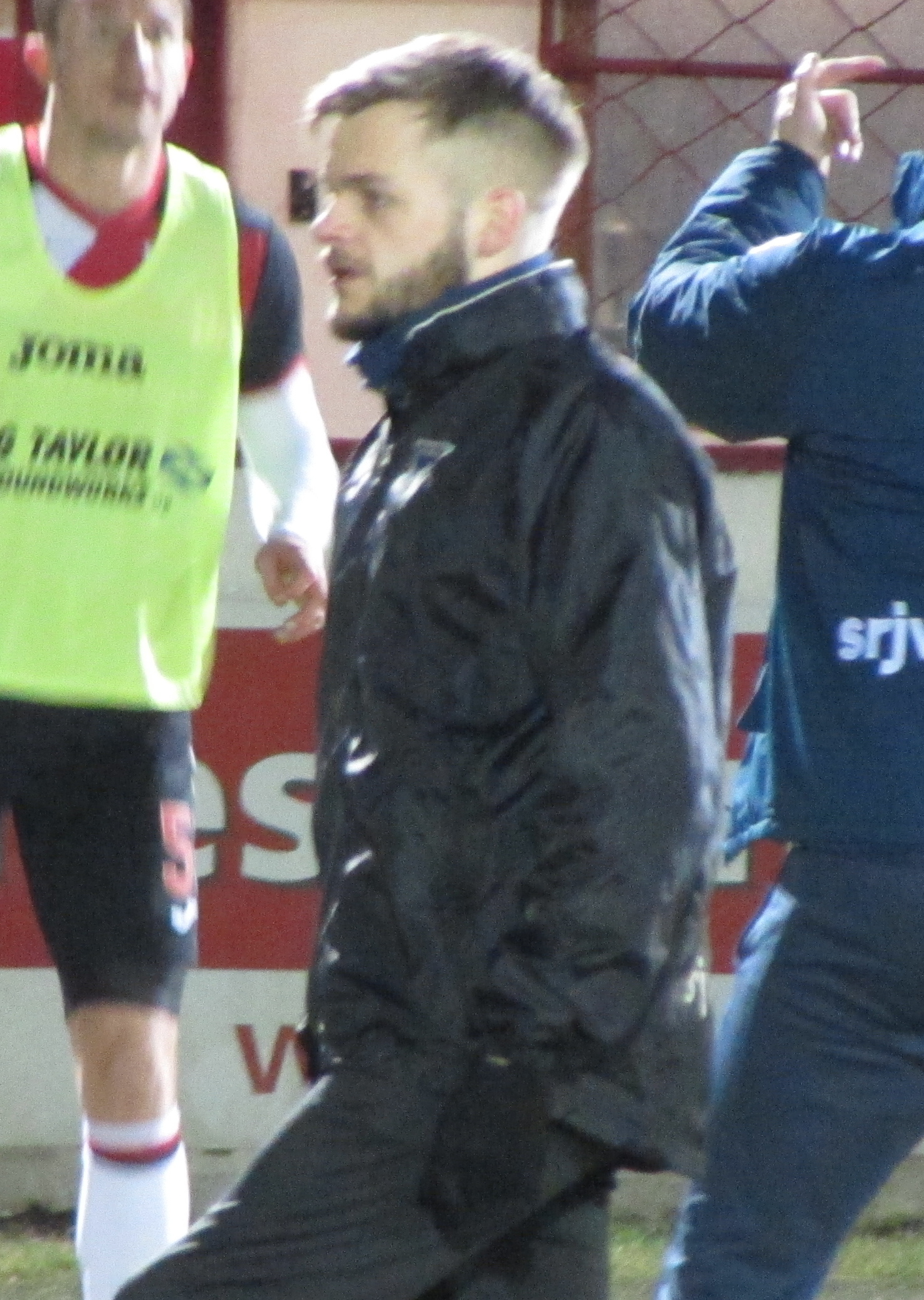
- Ryan, pre-match for Dunfermline Athletic in 2018

Personal information
- Date of birth: 29 September 1994 (age 32)
- Position: Striker

Team information
- Current team: Hamilton Academical
- Number: 29

Youth career
- Hamilton Academical

Senior career*
Years	Team	Apps	(Gls)
2011–2015	Hamilton Academical	74	(7)
2013	→ Brechin City (loan)	4	(1)
2015	→ Arbroath (loan)	10	(3)
2015–2016	Arbroath (trialist)	3	(1)
2016	Forfar Athletic	16	(9)
2016–2017	Airdrieonians	34	(24)
2017–2020	Dunfermline Athletic	45	(8)
2020	→ Airdrieonians (loan)	7	(2)
2020–2021	Stirling Albion	19	(10)
2021–2023	Hamilton Academical	45	(13)
2023–2026	Larne	95	(59)
2026–	Hamilton Academical	14	(8)
- * Club domestic league appearances and goals as of 22:04, 14 November 2026 (UTC)

Andy Ryan (born 29 September 1994) is a Scottish professional footballer who plays as a striker for Hamilton Academical.

Ryan began his career with Hamilton Academical, before moving on to Forfar Athletic and subsequently playing with Airdrieonians, Dunfermline Athletic, and Stirling Albion. He has also spent periods on loan with Brechin City and Arbroath.

== Career ==
He made his club debut for Hamilton Academical on 23 July 2011, in the semi-final of the Scottish Challenge Cup, before making his Scottish Football League debut one week later.

Ryan was named SFL Young Player of the Month for February 2012, and was given a three-year contract in March 2012.

In June 2012, Ryan praised the club's youth set-up. In September 2012, Ryan suffered an ankle injury. At the start of the 2013–14 season, Ryan publicly stated that he was eager to prove his worth for new manager Alex Neil.

On 18 October 2013, Ryan signed a one-month loan deal with Brechin City. After returning to Hamilton, he admitted his chances at the club had been limited but he was still grateful to play there. In April 2015 he signed a new contract with the club, until the summer of 2016. On 13 August 2015, Ryan joined Arbroath on a three-month loan. He left Hamilton by mutual consent in December 2015.

After leaving Hamilton, Ryan played three matches as trialist for Arbroath, scoring once against Clyde. He then signed for Forfar Athletic in January 2016.

Ryan signed for Airdrieonians in May 2016.

After a successful season with Airdrieonians, Ryan was signed for an undisclosed fee by Scottish Championship side Dunfermline Athletic on 15 August 2017. On the same day, Ryan made his debut for the Pars in a Scottish Challenge Cup match against his former club Arbroath, scoring both goals in a two-nil victory at East End Park. In January 2020 he returned to Airdrieonians on loan, scoring twice in 7 appearances. In May he was released by Dunfermline at the end of his contract.

Shortly after leaving Dunfermline, Ryan signed a deal with Scottish League Two side Stirling Albion. After a successful season in Stirling, Ryan returned to his first club Hamilton Academical on 28 June 2021, signing a two-year deal.

Ryan left Hamilton on 23 January 2023, to sign for Northern Irish club Larne.

Ryan returned to Hamilton Academical in June 2026.

== Career statistics ==
As of 29 November 2024

Appearances and goals by club, season and competition
Club	Season	League			National Cup		League Cup		Other		Total	
Club	Season	Division	Apps	Goals	Apps	Goals	Apps	Goals	Apps	Goals	Apps	Goals
Hamilton Academical	2011–12	Scottish First Division	21	4	2	0	0	0	2 (Note: Appearances in the Scottish Challenge Cup)	0	25	4
Hamilton Academical	2012–13	Scottish First Division	27	2	3	1	3	0	1	0	34	3
Hamilton Academical	2013–14	Scottish Championship	19	2	0	0	2	0	4 (Note: Appearances in the Scottish Premiership play-offs)	0	25	2
Hamilton Academical	2014–15	Scottish Premiership	7	0	0	0	2	0	0	0	9	0
Hamilton Academical	2015–16	Scottish Premiership	0	0	0	0	0	0	0	0	0	0
Hamilton Academical	Total		74	8	5	1	7	0	7	0	93	9
Brechin City (loan)	2013–14	Scottish League One	4	1	0	0	0	0	0	0	4	1
Arbroath (loan)	2015–16	Scottish League Two	10	3	0	0	0	0	0	0	10	3
Arbroath	2015–16	Scottish League Two	3	1	0	0	0	0	0	0	3	1
Arbroath	Total		13	4	0	0	0	0	0	0	13	4
Forfar Athletic	2015–16	Scottish League One	16	9	0	0	0	0	0	0	16	9
Airdrieonians	2016–17	Scottish League One	32	23	1	1	4	1	4 (Note: Two appearances and one goal in the Scottish Challenge Cup and two appearances and one goal in the Scottish Championship play-offs)	2	41	27
Airdrieonians	2017–18	Scottish League One	2	1	0	0	4	1	0	0	6	2
Airdrieonians	Total		34	24	1	1	8	2	4	2	47	29
Dunfermline Athletic	2017–18	Scottish Championship	19	4	1	1	0	0	4 (Note: Three appearances and three goals in the Scottish Challenge Cup and one appearance in the Scottish Premiership play-offs)	3	24	8
Dunfermline Athletic	2018–19	Scottish Championship	13	2	0	0	5	3	2	0	20	5
Dunfermline Athletic	2019–20	Scottish Championship	13	2	1	0	4	1	1	0	19	3
Dunfermline Athletic	Total		45	8	2	1	9	4	7	3	63	16
Airdrieonians (loan)	2019–20	Scottish League One	7	2	0	0	0	0	0	0	7	2
Stirling Albion	2020–21	Scottish League Two	19	10	3	1	0	0	0	0	22	11
Hamilton Academical	2021–22	Scottish Championship	32	9	1	0	1	0	3	2	37	11
Hamilton Academical	2022–23	Scottish Championship	13	4	2	3	4	2	0	0	19	9
Hamilton Academical	Total		45	13	3	3	5	2	3	2	56	20
Larne	2022–23	NIFL Premiership	14	7	3	1	0	0	0	0	17	8
Larne	2023–24	NIFL Premiership	32	24	3	4	2	1	5 (Note: 1 appearance in Charity Shield, 2 appearances in UEFA Champions League, 2 appearances in UEFA Conference League)	0	42	29
Larne	2024–25	NIFL Premiership	12	5	0	0	0	0	10 (Note: 1 appearance and 1 goal in Charity Shield, 2 appearances in UEFA Champions League, 7 appearances and 3 goals in UEFA Conference League)	4	22	9
Larne	Total		58	36	6	5	2	1	15	4	81	46
Career total			315	115	20	12	31	9	36	11	403	147

== Honours ==
Larne

- NIFL Premiership (3): 2022-23, 2023-24, 2025-26
- County Antrim Shield: 2023-24
- NIFL Charity Shield: 2024

Individual

- NIFL Premiership Team of the Season: 2023-24
