= 2018–19 Scottish League Cup =

Tournament details
- Country: Scotland
- Dates: 14 July 2018 – 2 December 2018
- Teams: 44

Final positions
- Champions: Celtic
- Runners-up: Aberdeen

Tournament statistics
- Matches played: 95
- Goals scored: 274 (2.88 per match)
- Top goal scorer: Lawrence Shankland (9 goals)

The 2018–19 Scottish League Cup (also known as the Betfred Cup for sponsorship reasons) was the 73rd season of Scotland's second-most prestigious football knockout competition.

The format for the 2018–19 competition was the same as the previous two seasons.

It began with eight groups of five teams which included all Scottish Professional Football League (SPFL) clubs, excluding those competing in Champions League and Europa League qualifiers, as well as the top teams from the 2017–18 Highland Football League (Cove Rangers) and the 2017–18 Lowland Football League (Spartans).

== Schedule ==
| Round | First match date | Fixtures | Clubs |
|---|---|---|---|
| Group stage | 14 July 2018 | 80 | 44 → 16 |
| Second round | 18 August 2018 | 8 | 16 → 8 |
| Quarter finals | 25 September 2018 | 4 | 8 → 4 |
| Semi finals | 27 October 2018 | 2 | 4 → 2 |
| Final | 2 December 2018 | 1 | 2 → 1 |

== Format ==
The competition began with eight groups of five teams. The four clubs competing in the UEFA Champions League (Celtic) and Europa League (Aberdeen, Hibernian and Rangers) qualifying rounds were given a bye through to the second round. The 40 teams competing in the group stage consisted of the other eight teams that competed in the 2017–18 Scottish Premiership, and all of the teams that competed in the 2017–18 Scottish Championship, 2017–18 Scottish League One and 2017–18 Scottish League Two, as well as the 2017–18 Highland Football League and the 2017–18 Lowland Football League champions.

The winners of each of the eight groups, as well as the four best runners-up progressed to the second round (last 16), which included the four UEFA qualifying clubs. At this stage, the competition reverted to the traditional knock-out format. The four group winners with the highest points total and the clubs entering at this stage were seeded, with the four group winners with the lowest points unseeded along with the four best runners-up.

=== Bonus point system ===
In December 2015, the SPFL announced that alongside the new group stage format, a bonus point system would be introduced to provide greater excitement and increase the number of meaningful games at this stage. The traditional point system of awarding three points for a win and one point for a draw is used, however, for each group stage match that finishes in a draw, a penalty shoot-out takes place, with the winner being awarded a bonus point.

== Group stage ==
The group stage was made up of eight teams from the 2017–18 Scottish Premiership, and all ten teams from each of the 2017–18 Scottish Championship, 2017–18 Scottish League One and 2017–18 Scottish League Two, as well as the winners of the 2017–18 Highland Football League and 2017–18 Lowland Football League. The 40 teams were divided into two sections – North and South – with each section containing four top seeds, four second seeds and 12 unseeded teams. Each section was drawn into four groups with each group comprising one top seed, one second seed and three unseeded teams.

The draw for the group stages took place on 25 May 2018 and was broadcast live on BT Sport 2.

=== North ===
==== Group A ====
| Pos | Team | Pld | W | PW | PL | L | GF | GA | GD | Pts | Qualification | ROS | ARB | ALO | DUN | ELG |
|---|---|---|---|---|---|---|---|---|---|---|---|---|---|---|---|---|
| 1 | Ross County (Q) | 4 | 3 | 0 | 0 | 1 | 6 | 4 | +2 | 9 | Qualification for the Second round | — | — | — | 1–0 | 2–0 |
| 2 | Arbroath | 4 | 2 | 1 | 0 | 1 | 9 | 6 | +3 | 8 | | 4–1 | — | — | — | 2–0 |
| 3 | Alloa Athletic | 4 | 2 | 1 | 0 | 1 | 8 | 5 | +3 | 8 | | 0–2 | 4–2 | — | — | — |
| 4 | Dundee United | 4 | 1 | 0 | 2 | 1 | 6 | 3 | +3 | 5 | | — | 1–1p | 1–1p | — | — |
| 5 | Elgin City | 4 | 0 | 0 | 0 | 4 | 0 | 11 | −11 | 0 | | — | — | 0–3 | 0–4 | — |

Rules for classification: 1) goal difference, 2) goals scored, 3) away goals scored, 4) matches won, 5) away matches won, 6) drawing of lots.
(Q) Qualified to the phase indicated

==== Group B ====
| Pos | Team | Pld | W | PW | PL | L | GF | GA | GD | Pts | Qualification | STJ | FAL | MON | FOR | EFI |
|---|---|---|---|---|---|---|---|---|---|---|---|---|---|---|---|---|
| 1 | St Johnstone (Q) | 4 | 3 | 1 | 0 | 0 | 5 | 1 | +4 | 11 | Qualification for the Second round | — | 1–0 | — | — | p0–0 |
| 2 | Falkirk | 4 | 2 | 0 | 0 | 2 | 4 | 3 | +1 | 6 | | — | — | 0–1 | 2–0 | — |
| 3 | Montrose | 4 | 2 | 0 | 0 | 2 | 3 | 4 | −1 | 6 | | 0–1 | — | — | — | 1–0 |
| 4 | Forfar Athletic | 4 | 1 | 1 | 0 | 2 | 5 | 7 | −2 | 5 | | 1–3 | — | 3–1 | — | — |
| 5 | East Fife | 4 | 0 | 0 | 2 | 2 | 2 | 4 | −2 | 2 | | — | 1–2 | — | 1–1p | — |

Rules for classification: 1) goal difference, 2) goals scored, 3) away goals scored, 4) matches won, 5) away matches won, 6) drawing of lots.
(Q) Qualified to the phase indicated

==== Group C ====
| Pos | Team | Pld | W | PW | PL | L | GF | GA | GD | Pts | Qualification | HOM | INV | COW | COV | RAI |
|---|---|---|---|---|---|---|---|---|---|---|---|---|---|---|---|---|
| 1 | Heart of Midlothian (Note: Heart of Midlothian were deducted two points for fielding an ineligible player against Cove Rangers on 18 July 2018.) (Q) | 4 | 3 | 1 | 0 | 0 | 13 | 2 | +11 | 9 | Qualification for the Second round | — | 5–0 | 5–0 | — | — |
| 2 | Inverness Caledonian Thistle | 4 | 3 | 0 | 0 | 1 | 9 | 8 | +1 | 9 | | — | — | — | 2–0 | 2–1 |
| 3 | Cowdenbeath | 4 | 2 | 0 | 0 | 2 | 5 | 10 | −5 | 6 | | — | 2–5 | — | 1–0 | — |
| 4 | Cove Rangers | 4 | 1 | 0 | 0 | 3 | 3 | 5 | −2 | 3 | | 1–2 | — | — | — | 2–0 |
| 5 | Raith Rovers | 4 | 0 | 0 | 1 | 3 | 2 | 7 | −5 | 1 | | 1–1p | — | 0–2 | — | — |

Rules for classification: 1) goal difference, 2) goals scored, 3) away goals scored, 4) matches won, 5) away matches won, 6) drawing of lots.
(Q) Qualified to the phase indicated

==== Group D ====
| Pos | Team | Pld | W | PW | PL | L | GF | GA | GD | Pts | Qualification | DNF | DND | BRE | STI | PET |
|---|---|---|---|---|---|---|---|---|---|---|---|---|---|---|---|---|
| 1 | Dunfermline Athletic (Q) | 4 | 4 | 0 | 0 | 0 | 14 | 2 | +12 | 12 | Qualification for the Second round | — | — | — | 3–1 | 3–0 |
| 2 | Dundee (Q) | 4 | 3 | 0 | 0 | 1 | 8 | 1 | +7 | 9 | Qualification for the Second round | 0–1 | — | 2–0 | — | — |
| 3 | Brechin City | 4 | 1 | 0 | 1 | 2 | 3 | 10 | −7 | 4 | | 1–7 | — | — | — | 0–0p |
| 4 | Stirling Albion | 4 | 1 | 0 | 0 | 3 | 4 | 9 | −5 | 3 | | — | 0–4 | 1–2 | — | — |
| 5 | Peterhead | 4 | 0 | 1 | 0 | 3 | 0 | 7 | −7 | 2 | | — | 0–2 | — | 0–2 | — |

Rules for classification: 1) goal difference, 2) goals scored, 3) away goals scored, 4) matches won, 5) away matches won, 6) drawing of lots.
(Q) Qualified to the phase indicated

=== South ===
==== Group E ====
| Pos | Team | Pld | W | PW | PL | L | GF | GA | GD | Pts | Qualification | AYR | PAR | GMO | STE | ALB |
|---|---|---|---|---|---|---|---|---|---|---|---|---|---|---|---|---|
| 1 | Ayr United (Q) | 4 | 4 | 0 | 0 | 0 | 12 | 1 | +11 | 12 | Qualification for the Second round | — | — | 3–1 | 5–0 | — |
| 2 | Partick Thistle (Q) | 4 | 3 | 0 | 0 | 1 | 6 | 3 | +3 | 9 | Qualification for the Second round | 0–2 | — | 2–1 | — | — |
| 3 | Greenock Morton | 4 | 2 | 0 | 0 | 2 | 9 | 5 | +4 | 6 | | — | — | — | 2–0 | 5–0 |
| 4 | Stenhousemuir | 4 | 1 | 0 | 0 | 3 | 4 | 9 | −5 | 3 | | — | 0–2 | — | — | 4–0 |
| 5 | Albion Rovers | 4 | 0 | 0 | 0 | 4 | 0 | 13 | −13 | 0 | | 0–2 | 0–2 | — | — | — |

Rules for classification: 1) goal difference, 2) goals scored, 3) away goals scored, 4) matches won, 5) away matches won, 6) drawing of lots.
(Q) Qualified to the phase indicated

==== Group F ====
| Pos | Team | Pld | W | PW | PL | L | GF | GA | GD | Pts | Qualification | LIV | AIR | HAM | ANN | BER |
|---|---|---|---|---|---|---|---|---|---|---|---|---|---|---|---|---|
| 1 | Livingston (Q) | 4 | 3 | 1 | 0 | 0 | 5 | 1 | +4 | 11 | Qualification for the Second round | — | — | — | 1–0 | 2–0 |
| 2 | Airdrieonians | 4 | 2 | 0 | 1 | 1 | 9 | 4 | +5 | 7 | | 1–2 | — | — | 4–1 | — |
| 3 | Hamilton Academical | 4 | 1 | 1 | 1 | 1 | 5 | 2 | +3 | 6 | | 0–0p | p1–1 | — | — | — |
| 4 | Annan Athletic | 4 | 2 | 0 | 0 | 2 | 6 | 5 | +1 | 6 | | — | — | 1–0 | — | 4–0 |
| 5 | Berwick Rangers | 4 | 0 | 0 | 0 | 4 | 0 | 10 | −10 | 0 | | — | 0–3 | 0–4 | — | — |

Rules for classification: 1) goal difference, 2) goals scored, 3) away goals scored, 4) matches won, 5) away matches won, 6) drawing of lots.
(Q) Qualified to the phase indicated

==== Group G ====
| Pos | Team | Pld | W | PW | PL | L | GF | GA | GD | Pts | Qualification | MOT | QOS | EDC | CLY | STR |
|---|---|---|---|---|---|---|---|---|---|---|---|---|---|---|---|---|
| 1 | Motherwell (Q) | 4 | 3 | 0 | 1 | 0 | 11 | 2 | +9 | 10 | Qualification for the Second round | — | 2–0 | 5–0 | — | — |
| 2 | Queen of the South (Q) | 4 | 3 | 0 | 0 | 1 | 12 | 5 | +7 | 9 | Qualification for the Second round | — | — | — | 3–0 | 5–3 |
| 3 | Edinburgh City | 4 | 1 | 1 | 0 | 2 | 5 | 12 | −7 | 5 | | — | 0–4 | — | — | 4–2 |
| 4 | Clyde | 4 | 1 | 0 | 1 | 2 | 5 | 8 | −3 | 4 | | 1–3 | — | 1–1p | — | — |
| 5 | Stranraer | 4 | 0 | 1 | 0 | 3 | 7 | 13 | −6 | 2 | | p1–1 | — | — | 1–3 | — |

Rules for classification: 1) goal difference, 2) goals scored, 3) away goals scored, 4) matches won, 5) away matches won, 6) drawing of lots.
(Q) Qualified to the phase indicated

==== Group H ====
| Pos | Team | Pld | W | PW | PL | L | GF | GA | GD | Pts | Qualification | KIL | STM | DUM | QPA | SPA |
|---|---|---|---|---|---|---|---|---|---|---|---|---|---|---|---|---|
| 1 | Kilmarnock (Q) | 4 | 3 | 0 | 1 | 0 | 9 | 2 | +7 | 10 | Qualification for the Second round | — | 0–0p | — | 2–0 | — |
| 2 | St Mirren (Q) | 4 | 1 | 3 | 0 | 0 | 8 | 2 | +6 | 9 | Qualification for the Second round | — | — | 6–0 | — | p2–2 |
| 3 | Dumbarton | 4 | 1 | 1 | 0 | 2 | 3 | 10 | −7 | 5 | | 2–4 | — | — | 1–0 | — |
| 4 | Queen's Park | 4 | 1 | 0 | 1 | 2 | 2 | 4 | −2 | 4 | | — | 0–0p | — | — | 2–1 |
| 5 | Spartans | 4 | 0 | 0 | 2 | 2 | 3 | 7 | −4 | 2 | | 0–3 | — | 0–0p | — | — |

Rules for classification: 1) goal difference, 2) goals scored, 3) away goals scored, 4) matches won, 5) away matches won, 6) drawing of lots.
(Q) Qualified to the phase indicated

=== Best runners-up ===
| Pos | Grp | Team | Pld | W | PW | PL | L | GF | GA | GD | Pts | Qualification |
|---|---|---|---|---|---|---|---|---|---|---|---|---|
| 1 | G | Queen of the South (Q) | 4 | 3 | 0 | 0 | 1 | 12 | 5 | +7 | 9 | Qualification for the Second round |
| 2 | D | Dundee (Q) | 4 | 3 | 0 | 0 | 1 | 8 | 1 | +7 | 9 | Qualification for the Second round |
| 3 | H | St Mirren (Q) | 4 | 1 | 3 | 0 | 0 | 8 | 2 | +6 | 9 | Qualification for the Second round |
| 4 | E | Partick Thistle (Q) | 4 | 3 | 0 | 0 | 1 | 6 | 3 | +3 | 9 | Qualification for the Second round |
| 5 | C | Inverness Caledonian Thistle | 4 | 3 | 0 | 0 | 1 | 9 | 8 | +1 | 9 | |
| 6 | A | Arbroath | 4 | 2 | 1 | 0 | 1 | 9 | 6 | +3 | 8 | |
| 7 | F | Airdrieonians | 4 | 2 | 0 | 1 | 1 | 9 | 4 | +5 | 7 | |
| 8 | B | Falkirk | 4 | 2 | 0 | 0 | 2 | 4 | 3 | +1 | 6 | |

Rules for classification: 1) goal difference, 2) goals scored, 3) away goals scored, 4) matches won, 5) away matches won, 6) drawing of lots.
(Q) Qualified to the phase indicated

== Knockout phase ==
=== Second round ===
==== Draw and seeding ====
Aberdeen, Celtic, Hibernian and Rangers entered the competition at this stage, after receiving a bye for the group stage due to their participation in UEFA club competitions.

The draw for the second round took place at Tynecastle Park following the conclusion of the Heart of Midlothian-Inverness Caledonian Thistle match on 29 July 2018. The four UEFA-qualifying clubs and the four group winners with the best record were seeded for the draw.

Teams in Bold advanced to the quarter-finals.

| Seeded | Unseeded |
|---|---|
| **Aberdeen**; **Ayr United**†; **Celtic**; Dunfermline Athletic†; **Hibernian**; Livingston; **Rangers**; **St Johnstone** | Dundee; **Heart of Midlothian**; Kilmarnock; **Motherwell**; Partick Thistle†; Queen of the South†; Ross County†; St Mirren |

Notes

- † denotes teams playing in the Championship.

==== Matches ====
| 18 August 2018 | Partick Thistle | **1–3** | **Celtic** | Glasgow |
| 12:30 | Mbuyi-Mutombo 73' | | Griffiths 18'; Dembélé 78'; Rogic 80' | Stadium: Firhill Stadium; Attendance: 6,350; Referee: Craig Thomson |

| 18 August 2018 | Livingston | **0–1** | **Motherwell** | Livingston |
| 15:00 | | | Johnson 23' | Stadium: Almondvale Stadium; Attendance: 1,957; Referee: Willie Collum |

| 18 August 2018 | Dundee | **0–3** | **Ayr United** | Dundee |
| 15:00 | | | Shankland 51', 86'; Moffat 89' | Stadium: Dens Park; Attendance: 3,151; Referee: John Beaton |

| 18 August 2018 | Dunfermline Athletic | **0–1** | **Heart of Midlothian** | Dunfermline |
| 15:00 | | | Lee 79' | Stadium: East End Park; Attendance: 8,601; Referee: Bobby Madden |

| 18 August 2018 | **Aberdeen** | **4–0** | St Mirren | Aberdeen |
| 15:00 | Mackay-Steven 16', 57' (pen.); Shinnie 20'; May 26' | | | Stadium: Pittodrie Stadium; Attendance: 9,011; Referee: Steven McLean |

| 18 August 2018 | Queen of the South | **2–4** (a.e.t.) | **St Johnstone** | Dumfries |
| 15:00 | Dykes 45+1'; Dobbie 116' (pen.) | | Watt 27', 105'; Wright 96'; Hendry 120+3' | Stadium: Palmerston Park; Attendance: 1,652; Referee: Don Robertson |

| 19 August 2018 | Kilmarnock | **1–3** | **Rangers** | Kilmarnock |
| 12:30 | Barišić 51' (o.g.) | | Morelos 28', 43', 74' | Stadium: Rugby Park; Attendance: 12,016; Referee: Nick Walsh |

| 19 August 2018 | **Hibernian** | **3–2** | Ross County | Edinburgh |
| 15:00 | Gray 15'; Mallan 70'; Horgan 90+1' | | Gardyne 10'; Mullin 64' (pen.) | Stadium: Easter Road; Attendance: 7,452; Referee: Kevin Clancy |

=== Quarter-finals ===
==== Draw ====
The draw for the quarter-finals took place on 19 August 2018 following the conclusion of the Kilmarnock-Rangers match. The draw was unseeded.

Teams in Bold advanced to the semi-finals.

==== Teams ====
| Premiership | Championship |
|---|---|
| **Aberdeen**; **Celtic**; **Heart of Midlothian**; Hibernian; Motherwell; **Rangers**; St Johnstone | Ayr United |

==== Matches ====
| 25 September 2018 | Hibernian | **0–0** (a.e.t.) (**5–6** p) | **Aberdeen** | Edinburgh |
| 19:45 | | Report | | Stadium: Easter Road; Attendance: 11,170; Referee: Steven McLean |
| | **Penalties** |
| | Mallan (penalty missed); Slivka (penalty scored); Whittaker (penalty scored); Stevenson (penalty scored); Boyle (penalty scored); Shaw (penalty scored); Agyepong (penalty missed) | | (penalty scored) Shinnie; (penalty scored) Mackay-Steven; (penalty missed) McGinn; (penalty scored) Anderson; (penalty scored) May; (penalty scored) Forrester; (penalty scored) McKenna |

| 26 September 2018 | **Rangers** | **4–0** | Ayr United | Glasgow |
| 19:45 | Katić 16'; Middleton 31', 70'; Morelos 49' | Report | | Stadium: Ibrox Stadium; Attendance: 35,042; Referee: Bobby Madden |

| 26 September 2018 | St Johnstone | **0–1** | **Celtic** | Perth |
| 19:45 | | Report | Griffiths 83' | Stadium: McDiarmid Park; Attendance: 5,635; Referee: John Beaton |

| 26 September 2018 | **Heart of Midlothian** | **4–2** | Motherwell | Edinburgh |
| 19:45 | MacLean 35'; Haring 64'; Lee 88'; Naismith 90+1' | Report | Main 12' (pen.); Bowman 80' | Stadium: Tynecastle Park; Attendance: 14,377; Referee: Willie Collum |

=== Semi-finals ===
==== Draw ====
The draw for the semi-finals took place on 26 September 2018 following the conclusion of the final three quarter-final matches. The draw was unseeded.

==== Teams ====
Premiership
- Aberdeen
- Celtic
- Heart of Midlothian
- Rangers

==== Matches ====
| 28 October 2018 | Heart of Midlothian | **0–3** | **Celtic** | Edinburgh |
| 13:30 | | Report | Sinclair 53' (pen.); Forrest 66'; Christie 72' | Stadium: Murrayfield Stadium; Attendance: 61,161; Referee: Willie Collum |

| 28 October 2018 | **Aberdeen** | **1–0** | Rangers | Glasgow |
| 16:30 | Ferguson 79' | Report | | Stadium: Hampden Park; Attendance: 46,186; Referee: John Beaton |

==== Semi-final controversy ====
The semi-finals were due to take place at Hampden Park on 27 and 28 October 2018, but due to Celtic and Rangers participating in the 2018–19 UEFA Europa League group stage, the team who would play on the Saturday would have less than 48 hours rest before the match. As a result, the SPFL - who had previously committed to using Hampden as the venue for the League Cup semi-finals and final - consulted with the four clubs involved, competition broadcaster BT Sport and Police Scotland to find a solution which may have included playing one match at Murrayfield Stadium or a change in date.

The SPFL announced on 27 September 2018 that both matches will be played at Hampden Park on the Sunday (28 October), with first match starting at noon and the other being played in the evening. The following day, SPFL chief executive Neil Doncaster said the decision was "the best solution" despite the "regrettable inconvenience" to supporters. The SPFL are contractually obliged to use Hampden Park as the venue for the semi-finals of the League Cup when Rangers or Celtic are involved or an attendance of over 20,000 is expected.

Aberdeen and Heart of Midlothian both criticised the SPFL for the decision saying they were "appalled" and "astonished". Aberdeen released a statement to confirm their "dismay" that their match would kick-off at a "completely unacceptable" time for their supporters. The first train leaving Aberdeen on 28 October 2018 would not arrive in Glasgow until 12:14, 14 minutes after kick-off. Heart of Midlothian manager Craig Levein said that playing both semi-finals at Hampden on the same day is the "craziest thing", "beyond belief" and "madness" and, in a statement released by the club, chairwoman Ann Budge said she had asked the SPFL if they could be released from their contract with Hampden Park Ltd as a result of the "very special circumstances" and was then told a formal request by the SPFL had been unsuccessful.

On 2 October 2018, Police Scotland Assistant Chief Constable Bernard Higgins said that they were "aware of issues and concerns" regarding the semi-final arrangements. As a result, the SPFL are reported to be considering moving the Heart of Midlothian-Celtic semi-final to Murrayfield Stadium pending a meeting with Police Scotland.

On 3 October 2018, the SPFL confirmed that venues and kick-off times had been switched to 13:30 at Murrayfield and 16:30 at Hampden.

== Final ==
2 December 2018
15:00

| Celtic | 1–0 | Aberdeen |
|---|---|---|
| Christie 45+5' | Report |

Hampden Park, Glasgow
Attendance: 50,936
Referee: Andrew Dallas

== Top goalscorers ==
As of matches played on 2 December 2018

| Rank | Player | Club | Goals |
|---|---|---|---|
| 1 | (Scotland) Lawrence Shankland | Ayr United | 9 |
| 2 | (Scotland) Stephen Dobbie | Queen of the South | 8 |
| 3 | (Scotland) Michael Moffat | Ayr United | 4 |
| 3 | (Scotland) Jordyn Sheerin | Cowdenbeath | 4 |
| 3 | (England) Myles Hippolyte | Dunfermline Athletic | 4 |
| 3 | (Scotland) Steven Naismith | Hearts | 4 |
| 3 | (Scotland) Kris Boyd | Kilmarnock | 4 |
| 3 | (Colombia) Alfredo Morelos | Rangers | 4 |
| 3 | (Scotland) Tony Watt | St Johnstone | 4 |

== Media coverage ==
The domestic broadcasting rights for the competition are held exclusively by BT Sport.

The following matches will be broadcast live on UK television:

| Round | Date | Match |
|---|---|---|
| Group Stage | 13 July 2018 | Kilmarnock v St Mirren |
| Group Stage | 21 July 2018 | Raith Rovers v Heart of Midlothian |
| Group Stage | 22 July 2018 | Dundee v Dunfermline Athletic |
| Group Stage | 28 July 2018 | Clyde v Motherwell |
| Group Stage | 29 July 2018 | Heart of Midlothian v Inverness Caledonian Thistle |
| Second Round | 18 August 2018 | Partick Thistle v Celtic |
| Second Round | 19 August 2018 | Kilmarnock v Rangers |
| Quarter-finals | 25 September 2018 | Hibernian v Aberdeen |
| Quarter-finals | 26 September 2018 | St Johnstone v Celtic |
| Semi-finals | 28 October 2018 | Aberdeen v Rangers; Heart of Midlothian v Celtic |
| Final | 2 December 2018 | Celtic v Aberdeen |
