= 2024–25 South Challenge Cup =

SFA South Region Challenge Cup

Tournament details
- Country: Scotland; England (2 teams)
- Dates: 17 August 2024 – 30 March 2025
- Teams: 163

Final positions
- Champions: East Kilbride
- Runners-up: Auchinleck Talbot

Tournament statistics
- Matches played: 152
- Goals scored: 641 (4.22 per match)
- All statistics correct as of 6 April 2025.

The 2024–25 SFA South Region Challenge Cup (known as the FinestCarMats.co.uk South Challenge Cup for sponsorship reasons) was the 18th edition of the annual knockout cup competition for senior non-league football clubs in the central and southern regions of Scotland. For a third season in a row, the tournament entry was a joint record 163 teams.

The defending champions were four-time winners East Kilbride. They successfully retained their title for the first time with a 2–0 win over Auchinleck Talbot in the final as part of a non-league treble, after also winning the Lowland League and Lowland League Cup.

== Format ==
The South Challenge Cup featured 163 senior non-league clubs from the Lowland Football League (16), East of Scotland Football League (57), South of Scotland Football League (11), and West of Scotland Football League (79). The reserve teams of Stirling University and Stranraer, as well as Celtic B and Heart of Midlothian B, do not take part. Carluke Rovers were debarred due to a previous breach of rules.

In a change to previous seasons there was no regionalisation and it was an all-in draw from the first round. The draws were unseeded, with matches proceeding to extra time and penalties if they were tied after 90 minutes.

== Calendar ==
Round	Main date	Fixtures	Clubs
First Round	17 August 2024	35	163 → 128
Second Round	14 September 2024	64	128 → 64
Third Round	12 October 2024	32	64 → 32
Fourth Round	16 November 2024	16	32 → 16
Fifth Round	21 December 2024	8	16 → 8
Quarter-Finals	1 February 2025	4	8 → 4
Semi-Finals	1 March 2025	2	4 → 2
Final	30 March 2025	1	2 → 1

== First round ==
The first round draw was published on 11 July 2024.

Home team	Score	Away team
17 August 2024
Ardeer Thistle	0–4	Clydebank
Ardrossan Winton Rovers	3–4 aet	Broxburn Athletic
Auchinleck Talbot	1–0	Hutchison Vale
Benburb	2–0	Yoker Athletic
Blantyre Victoria	2–2 aet (2–4 pen)	Lochgelly Albert
Broomhill	0–1	Thornton Hibs
BSC Glasgow	4–3 aet	St Peter's
Burntisland Shipyard	1–6	Glenrothes
Caledonian Locomotives	2–2 aet (5–4 pen)	Lochmaben
Cambuslang Rangers	2–3	Vale of Leven
Creetown	2–1	Tynecastle
Cumbernauld Colts	4–3	Linlithgow Rose
Dalbeattie Star	1–2	Blackburn United
Dundonald Bluebell	0–4	Troon
Edinburgh Community	2–3	Newton Stewart
Edinburgh South	2–3 (Note: Venue reversed after original draw.)	Bellshill Athletic
Fauldhouse United	0–8	Albion Rovers

Home team	Score	Away team
Glasgow Perthshire	2–3	Drumchapel United
Glasgow United	5–3	University of Stirling
Greenock Juniors	3–1	Glenvale
Inverkeithing Hillfield Swifts	2–3	Lesmahagow
Kilsyth Rangers	1–2	Hurlford United
Kinnoull	1–2	Newburgh
Kirkintilloch Rob Roy	2–0	Mid Annandale
Lanark United	3–2	Whitburn
Lochar Thistle	3–4	East Stirlingshire
Luncarty	2–5	Kilbirnie Ladeside
Maybole Juniors	0–1	Caledonian Braves
Petershill	1–4	Darvel
Pumpherston	0–5	Irvine Victoria
Shotts Bon Accord	2–1 aet	Rutherglen Glencairn
St Andrews United	w/o	Gartcairn
Vale of Clyde	5–1 aet	Stoneyburn
Whitehill Welfare	2–0	Kennoway Star Hearts
Wishaw	0–0 aet (4–1 pen)	Oakley United

== Second Round ==
The second round draw was published on 11 July 2024. Remaining in the competition were 128 clubs, from the Lowland Football League (13), East of Scotland Football League (42), South of Scotland Football League (7), and West of Scotland Football League (66).

Home team	Score	Away team
14 September 2024
Abbey Vale	0–3	Dalkeith Thistle
Albion Rovers	2–1 aet	Dunipace
Arniston Rangers	2–0	Cumbernauld Colts
Arthurlie	3–0	Easterhouse FA
Bathgate Thistle	0–1	Girvan
Beith Juniors	4–1	Armadale Thistle
Berwick Rangers	2–1	Heriot-Watt University
Bo'ness Athletic	1–4	Auchinleck Talbot
BSC Glasgow	0–5	Lesmahgow
Campbeltown Pupils	0–6	Linton Hotspur
Clydebank	7–1	Caledonian Locomotives
Coldstream	0–1	Blackburn United
Cumbernauld United	7–1	Tweedmouth Rangers
Cumnock Juniors	3–1	Lanark United
Darvel	3–2 aet	Whitletts Victoria
Drumchapel United	1–0 aet	Johnstone Burgh
Easthouses Lily	2–3	St Roch's
East Kilbride	2–1	Tranent
East Kilbride Thistle	1–5	Kilbirnie Ladeside
Edinburgh College	4–1	Creetown
Edinburgh United	1–3	Glasgow United
Eglinton	5–0	Bonnyton Thistle
Finnart	1–6 (Note: Venue reversed after original draw.)	Pollok
Gala Fairydean Rovers	4–2	Camelon Juniors
Glenafton Athletic	0–2	Dalry Thistle
Glenrothes	0–1	Forth Wanderers
Greenock Juniors	2–0	Thorniewood United
Gretna 2008	4–1	Newton Stewart
Haddington Athletic	1–2	Kilsyth Athletic
Harthill Royal	1–3	Knightswood
Hill of Beath Hawthorn	3–0	Edinburgh University
Hurlford United	3–1	Penicuik Athletic
Jeanfield Swifts	4–1	Glasgow University

Home team	Score	Away team
Kello Rovers	1–2	Sauchie Juniors
Kilwinning Rangers	3–2 aet	Muirkirk Juniors
Largs Thistle	7–0	Bellshill Athletic
Larkhall Thistle	4–0	Thornton Hibs
Livingston United	0–3	Bo’ness United
Lochore Welfare	2–1	Ashfield
Lugar Boswell Thistle	6–1	Craigmark Burntonians
Maryhill	3–1	Lochgelly Albert
Neilston	4–3	Peebles Rovers
Newburgh	2–3	Civil Service Strollers
Newmains United	2–2 aet (7–6 pen)	Leith Athletic
Newtongrange Star	2–1	Hawick Royal Albert
Nithsdale Wanderers	2–10	Broxburn Athletic
Ormiston Primrose	1–4	Cowdenbeath
Port Glasgow Juniors	4–3	West Park United
Renfrew	8–0	St Cuthbert Wanderers
Rossvale	0–2	Caledonian Braves
Royal Albert	1–2	Kirkintilloch Rob Roy
Saltcoats Victoria	0–2	Musselburgh Athletic
Shotts Bon Accord	1–0	Giffnock SC
St Cadoc's	7–0	Irvine Victoria
Thorn Athletic	3–2	Crossgates Primrose
Threave Rovers	4–2	Benburb
Troon	1–0	Dunbar United
Upper Annandale	1–2 aet	St Andrews United
Vale of Clyde	2–1 aet	Wishaw
Vale of Leithen	0–3	Preston Athletic
Vale of Leven	4–4 aet (1–3 pen)	Kirkcaldy & Dysart
West Calder United	1–2	East Stirlingshire
Whitehill Welfare	2–2 aet (10–9 pen)	St Anthony's
Wigtown & Bladnoch	0–10	Irvine Meadow XI

== Third round ==
The third round draw was published on 26 September 2024. Remaining in the competition were 64 clubs, from the Lowland Football League (11), East of Scotland Football League (15), and West of Scotland Football League (38).

Home team	Score	Away team
11 October 2024
St Cadoc's	3–0	Cowdenbeath
12 October 2024
Auchinleck Talbot	3–0	Jeanfield Swifts
Berwick Rangers	0–3	Threave Rovers
Blackburn United	3–1	Knightswood
Caledonian Braves	3–0	Arniston Rangers
Clydebank	5–1	Dalkeith Thistle
Cumbernauld United	8–0	Maryhill
Cumnock Juniors	2–1	Lochore Welfare
Dalry Thistle	0–3	Civil Service Strollers
Edinburgh College	2–3	Arthurlie
Eglinton	0–1	Bo'ness United
Gala Fairydean Rovers	0–1	Irvine Meadow XI
Glasgow United	6–5 aet	Forth Wanderers
Gretna 2008	3–1	Lesmahagow Juniors
Kirktintilloch Rob Roy	2–1	Whitehill Welfare
Larkhall Thistle	2–2 aet (5–4 pen)	Beith Juniors
Linton Hotspur	1–2 aet	Hill of Beath Hawthorn

Home team	Score	Away team
Lugar Boswell Thistle	2–4	Hurlford United
Musselburgh Athletic	2–0 aet	Kirkcaldy & Dysart
Neilston	2–3	East Stirlingshire
Newtongrange Star	0–3	Drumchapel United
Pollok	3–3 aet (4–2 pen)	Darvel
Port Glasgow Juniors	4–6	Kilsyth Athletic
Preston Athletic	3–2	Girvan
Sauchie Juniors	0–2	Kilwinning Rangers
St Andrews United	4–2	Kilbirnie Ladeside
St Roch's	1–3	Troon
Thorn Athletic	1–3	Broxburn Athletic
Vale of Clyde	2–0	Renfrew
29 October 2024
East Kilbride	1–0	Largs Thistle
16 November 2024
Shotts Bon Accord	0–0 aet (5–3 pen)	Albion Rovers
30 November 2024
Newmains United	0–6	Greenock Juniors

== Fourth round ==
The fourth round draw was published on 17 October 2024. Remaining in the competition were 32 clubs, from the Lowland Football League (7), East of Scotland Football League (5), and West of Scotland Football League (20).

Home team	Score	Away team
16 November 2024
Auchinleck Talbot	1–0	Cumbernauld United
Blackburn United	0–7	East Kilbride
Bo’ness United	3–4 aet	Musselburgh Athletic
Broxburn Athletic	0–4	Clydebank
Civil Service Strollers	3–1	Irvine Meadow XI
Cumnock Juniors	1–1 aet (4–2 pen)	Drumchapel United
East Stirlingshire	0–3	Pollok
Kilsyth Athletic	2–5	Glasgow United
Kirkintilloch Rob Roy	5–2	Preston Athletic
Larkhall Thistle	2–0	Threave Rovers
St Andrews United	5–3 aet	Hurlford United
St Cadoc’s	2–3	Gretna 2008
Troon	1–2	Arthurlie
Vale of Clyde	3–2	Caledonian Braves
30 November 2024
Shotts Bon Accord	3–2	Kilwinning Rangers
21 December 2024
Hill of Beath Hawthorn	4–0	Greenock Juniors

== Fifth round ==
The fourth round draw was published on 21 November 2024. Remaining in the competition were 16 clubs, from the Lowland Football League (3), East of Scotland Football League (3), and West of Scotland Football League (10).

Home team	Score	Away team
21 December 2024
Auchinleck Talbot	4–0	Larkhall Thistle
Civil Service Strollers	3–0	Shotts Bon Accord
Cumnock Juniors	3–0	St Andrews United
Pollok	1–3 aet	East Kilbride
Musselburgh Athletic	4–1	Vale of Clyde
1 February 2025
Arthurlie	2–1	Clydebank
Glasgow United	1–2	Kirkintilloch Rob Roy
Gretna 2008	1–3	Hill of Beath Hawthorn

== Quarter-finals ==
The draw for the quarter-finals and semi-finals was published on 9 January 2025. Remaining in the competition were 8 clubs, from the Lowland Football League (2), East of Scotland Football League (2), and West of Scotland Football League (4).

Home team	Score	Away team
1 February 2025
East Kilbride	1–1 aet (5–4 pen)	Cumnock Juniors
1 March 2025
Arthurlie	0–1	Musselburgh Athletic
Auchinleck Talbot	2–0	Kirkintilloch Rob Roy
Hill of Beath Hawthorn	2–1	Civil Service Strollers

== Semi-finals ==
Remaining in the competition were 4 clubs, from the Lowland Football League (1), East of Scotland Football League (2), and West of Scotland Football League (1).

Home team	Score	Away team
15 March 2025
East Kilbride	4–2	Musselburgh Athletic
22 March 2025
Auchinleck Talbot	1–1 aet (4–2 pen)	Hill of Beath Hawthorn

== Final ==
6 April 2025
14:00

East Kilbride	2–0	Auchinleck Talbot
Balde 13'; Elliot 55' (pen.)

Broadwood Stadium, Cumbernauld
Referee: Lewis Hogarth
