= 2012 Scottish Challenge Cup final =

- Event: 2011–12 Scottish Challenge Cup
Falkirk	Hamilton Academical
1	0
- Date: 1 April 2012
- Venue: Almondvale Stadium, Livingston
- Referee: Brian Winter
- Attendance: 5,210

The 2012 Scottish Challenge Cup final, also known as the Ramsdens Cup final for sponsorship reasons, was an association football match between Falkirk and Hamilton Academical on 1 April 2012 at Almondvale Stadium in Livingston. It was the 21st final of the Scottish Challenge Cup since it was first organised in 1990 to celebrate the centenary of the Scottish Football League.

Both teams progressed through four knock-out rounds to reach the final. The match was Falkirk's fourth appearance in the Scottish Challenge Cup Final with the club defending an unbeaten record in the final having won on three previous occasions, the most recent in 2004. It was also Hamilton's fourth appearance, the club winning twice in successive years in the early-1990s and losing in 2005. The tournament was contested by clubs below the Scottish Premier League with both clubs from the First Division. The match was watched by 5,210 spectators as well as being broadcast live on BBC Alba.

An early goal from Darren Dods in the 2nd minute was enough for Falkirk to win the match 1–0. In doing so Falkirk became the first club to win the tournament for a fourth time.

== Route to the final ==
The competition is a knock-out tournament and in 2011–12 was contested by 32 teams: the 30 clubs that played in the First, Second and Third Divisions of the Scottish Football League and two Highland Football League clubs by invitation. For the first round only, the draw was divided into two geographical regions made up of 16 clubs – north/east and south/west. Teams were paired at random and the winner of each match progressed to the next round and the loser was eliminated.

=== Falkirk ===
Round	Opposition	Score
First round	Brechin City (a)	2–1
Second round	Dundee (h)	1–0
Quarter-final	East Fife (a)	4–1
Semi-final	Annan Athletic (a)	3–0

Falkirk were placed in the north/east region for the first round and were drawn against Second Division side Brechin City away from home. All of the goals came in the first half but Darren Dods's debut goal in the 33rd minute proved to be the decider in the 2–1 win at Glebe Park. In the second round Falkirk faced fellow First Division side Dundee at the Falkirk Stadium. The only goal of the game came from Moroccan, Farid El Alagui in the 43rd minute and was enough to send Falkirk through to the quarter-final stage.

The reward for reaching the quarter-final stage was an away game against East Fife of the Second Division. The Methil based club took the lead on the 27th minute courtesy of a right-foot curler from Ryan Wallace. However, two goals in quick succession from Kallum Higginbotham and Craig Sibbald to make the score 3–1 was enough to overcome East Fife, with Higginbotham sealing the scoreline at 4–1 on the 87th minute in the match at Bayview Stadium.

The semi-final draw paired Falkirk with high flying Annan Athletic of the Third Division. Annan Athletic had played 12 games and won 10 in all competitions leading up to the semi-final tie and had knocked out First Division club Ayr United in the previous round. However, three first half goals, one from Mark Millar and two from Farid El Alagui saw off Annan Athletic in front of a record official attendance of 1,575 at Galabank.

=== Hamilton Academical ===
Round	Opposition	Score
First round	Queen's Park (a)	2–0
Second round	Partick Thistle (h)	1–0
Quarter-final	Greenock Morton (h)	2–1
Semi-final	Livingston (h)	1–0

Hamilton Academical competed in the south/west region for the first round and faced Third Division side Queen's Park at Hampden Park. Two debutant senior goals from Ali Crawford and David Hopkirk in the 72nd and 80th minutes respectively ensured a 2–0 victory for Accies and a clean sheet to progress to the second round. The opponents drawn were Partick Thistle of the First Division. A late penalty goal from Irishman James Chambers in the 86th minute at New Douglas Park was enough to book a place in the quarter-final stage.

The quarter-final draw paired Hamilton Academical with another First Division side, Greenock Morton, whom Accies defeated in the 1992 final. Despite Greenock Morton taking the lead in the 10th minute from a Paul Di Giacomo goal, Hamilton scored two other first half goals from Greig Spence and Simon Mensing to win 2–1 at New Douglas Park to progress to the semi-final stage.

A third club from the First Division provided the opposition for Hamilton in the semi-final in the form of Livingston. A late first half goal in the 43rd minute from Mark McLaughlin was enough to knock out the West Lothian side in front of a crowd of 1,418 and progress to their fourth Scottish Challenge Cup final in the club's history.

== Pre-match ==
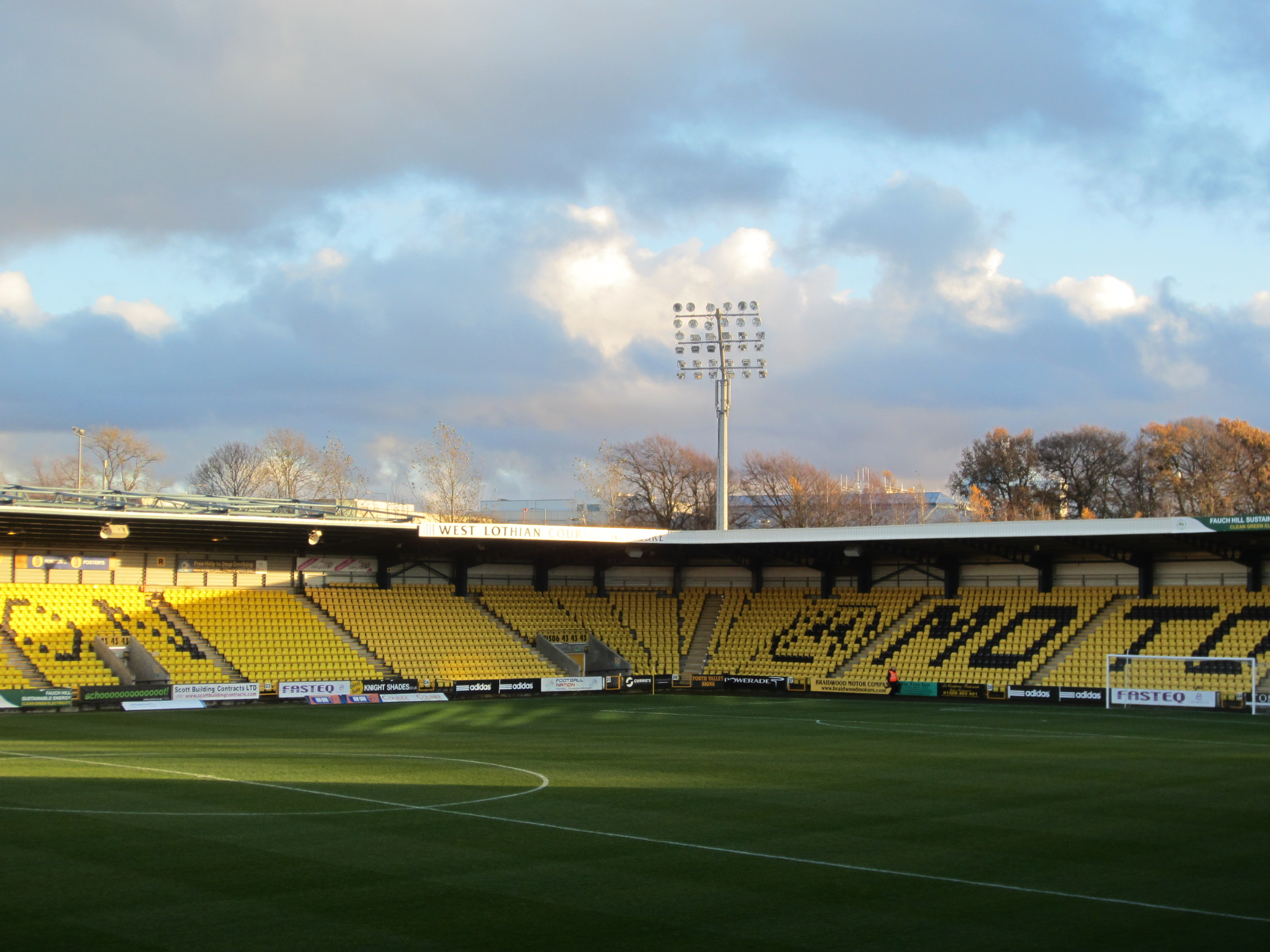
Almondvale Stadium hosted the final.

=== Venue ===
The 2012 final marked the first time the event was hosted at Almondvale Stadium in Livingston, the home of Livingston F.C. The venue opened in 1995 and at the time of the final was officially known as the Braidwood Motor Company Stadium after its sponsor. Seating arrangements for spectators in the stadium were segregated with Falkirk supporters occupying the East Stand and parts of the North and South Stands whilst Hamilton fans were allocated tickets for the West (Main) Stand. Falkirk travelled around 20 miles (32.2 km) to the venue and Hamilton Academical travelled approximately 30 miles (48.3 km).

=== Analysis ===
With the inclusion of two Highland League clubs for the first time, this brought the number of teams competing up to 32 which meant that there was no random bye for any club into the second round so both Falkirk and Hamilton entered the first round. Falkirk eliminated three lower league clubs en route to the final whilst Hamilton eliminated only one; defeating three First Division teams before the final.

Both teams appeared in the final for the fourth time. Falkirk had won the tournament on their three previous final appearances in 1993, 1997 and 2004, whereas Hamilton Academical had won the tournament twice in successive years in 1991 and 1992 and came runner-up in 2005.

== Match ==
=== Details ===
1 April 2012
16:05 BST

Falkirk	1–0	Hamilton Academical
Dods 2'	Report

Almondvale Stadium, Livingston
Attendance: 5,210
Referee: Brian Winter

Falkirk	Hamilton Academical

GK	1	(Northern Ireland) Michael McGovern
DF	2	(Scotland) Kieran Duffie
DF	3	(Scotland) Tam Scobbie
DF	4	(Scotland) Darren Dods (c)
DF	5	(Scotland) Murray Wallace
MF	6	(Scotland) Jay Fulton	(yellow card) 36'
MF	7	(Scotland) Craig Sibbald		(substituted off) 86'
MF	8	(Scotland) Mark Millar
FW	9	(Morocco) Farid El Alagui
MF	10	(Scotland) Willie Gibson
MF	11	(Scotland) David Weatherston
Substitutes:
DF	12	(England) Rhys Bennett
DF	14	(Scotland) Stephen Kingsley
MF	15	(Scotland) Blair Alston		(substituted on) 86'
FW	16	(Scotland) Jordan White
GK	17	(Scotland) Graham Bowman
Manager:
(Scotland) Steven Pressley

GK	1	(Scotland) David Hutton
DF	2	(England) Simon Mensing
DF	3	(Scotland) Mark McLaughlin		(substituted off) 71'
DF	4	(Scotland) Lee Kilday
MF	5	(England) Jon Routledge
MF	6	(England) Daniel Redmond
MF	7	(Scotland) Alex Neil (c)	(yellow card) 43'
MF	8	(Scotland) Jim McAlister
MF	9	(Scotland) Jordan Kirkpatrick		(substituted off) 45'
FW	10	(Scotland) Mark Stewart		(substituted off) 45'
FW	11	(Scotland) Jon McShane
Substitutes:
GK	12	(Scotland) Blair Currie
DF	13	(Scotland) Stephen Hendrie		(substituted on) 45'
DF	14	(Scotland) Grant Gillespie
FW	15	(Scotland) Greig Spence		(substituted on) 45'
FW	16	(Scotland) Andy Ryan		(substituted on) 71'
Manager:
(Scotland) Billy Reid

Officials

- Referee: Brian Winter
- Assistant Referee 1: David Watt
- Assistant Referee 2: Stuart Hodge

Match rules

- 90 minutes.
- 30 minutes of extra-time if necessary.
- Penalty shoot-out if scores still level.
- Five named substitutes.
- Maximum of three substitutions.

=== Statistics ===
Match statistics
	Falkirk	Hamilton
Goals scored	1	0
Total shots	6	8
Shots on target	3	5
Ball possession		
Corner kicks	5	2
Fouls committed	11	13
Offside	2	5
Yellow cards	1	1
Red cards	0	0
