= 2011–12 Scottish League Cup =

2011–12 Scottish Communities League Cup
Tournament details
- Country: Scotland
- Dates: 30 July 2011 – 18 March 2012
- Teams: 42

Final positions
- Champions: Kilmarnock
- Runners-up: Celtic

The 2011–12 Scottish League Cup was the 66th season of Scotland's second-most prestigious football knockout competition, the Scottish League Cup, also known as the Scottish Communities League Cup for sponsorship reasons. It was won by Kilmarnock

== Format ==
The competition is a single elimination knock-out competition. In each round, fixtures are determined by random draw, with the First Round to Third Round seeded according to last season's league positions (higher 50% of finishers drawn v lower 50% of finishers, alternating which is at home with each tie drawn).

Fixtures are played to a finish, with extra time and then penalties used in the event of ties. The competition is open to all clubs in the Scottish Premier League and Scottish Football League. Clubs involved in European competitions are given a bye to the third round to avoid congestion of fixtures.

- First round: The 30 sides from the previous season's Scottish Football League enter (including Dunfermline, promoted to the SPL).
- Second round: The 15 winners of the First Round are joined by 7 of the 8 of last season's SPL sides not in Europe (including Hamilton, relegated to the First Division).
- Third round: The 11 winners of the Second Round are joined by Kilmarnock plus the 4 SPL sides in Europe.
- Quarter-finals: The 8 winners of the third round play.
- Semi-finals: The 4 winners of the quarter-finals play.
- Final: The 2 winners of the semi-finals play.

=== Adjustments from the previous editions ===
The Cup is now sponsored by the Scottish Government.

== Schedule ==
- Round 1: Saturday 30 July
- Round 2: Tuesday 23 & Wednesday 24 August
- Round 3: Tuesday 20 & Wednesday 21 September
- Quarter-finals: Tuesday 25 & Wednesday 26 October
- Semi-finals: Saturday 28 & Sunday 29 January 2012, Hampden Park, Glasgow
- Final: Sunday 18 March, Hampden Park, Glasgow

== Fixtures and results ==
=== First round ===
The First round draw was conducted on Thursday 2 June 2011 at 2:15pm at Ravenscraig Sports Centre in Motherwell. All matches were played on Saturday 30 July 2011 at 15:00.

Saturday, 30 July	Airdrie United	5–0	Stirling Albion	New Broomfield
15:00	Graeme Owens 32' (pen.), 78' (pen.); Ryan Donelly 35', 81'; Jamie Bain 88'			Attendance: 705; Referee: Hilland

Saturday, 30 July	Albion Rovers	2–4	Falkirk	Cliftonhill
15:00

Saturday, 30 July	Alloa Athletic	0–3	Morton	Recreation Park
15:00

Saturday, 30 July	Annan Athletic	1–2	Dunfermline Athletic	Galabank
15:00

Saturday, 30 July	Brechin City	2–4 (a.e.t.)	Clyde	Glebe Park
15:00

Saturday, 30 July	Cowdenbeath	2–2 (a.e.t.) (3–4 p)	Stenhousemuir	Central Park
15:00				Attendance: 293; Referee: McKendrick

Saturday, 30 July	Dumbarton	0–4	Dundee	Strathclyde Homes Stadium
15:00

Saturday, 30 July	East Fife	2–1	Elgin City	Bayview Stadium
15:00

Saturday, 30 July	East Stirlingshire	0–3	Ayr United	Ochilview Park
15:00

Saturday, 30 July	Forfar Athletic	2–0	Peterhead	Station Park
15:00

Saturday, 30 July	Livingston	6–0	Arbroath	Almondvale Stadium
15:00	Boulding 2'; Russell 7', 22'; Jacobs 33'; Talbot 66'; McNulty 72'			Attendance: 804; Referee: Allan

Saturday, 30 July	Montrose	1–4	Raith Rovers	Links Park
15:00	Winter 20'		Williamson 31'; Walker 52'; Baird 54'; Thomson 77'	Attendance: 614; Referee: Colvin

Saturday, 30 July	Partick Thistle	1–3	Berwick Rangers	Firhill Stadium
15:00	Cairney 28'		Gray 33'; Noble 73'; Currie 79' (pen.)	Attendance: 1,255; Referee: McLean

Saturday, 30 July	Queen of the South	2–1	Stranraer	Palmerston Park
15:00	Carmichael 19'; Brighton 78'		Gallacher 15'	Attendance: 1,511; Referee: O'Reilly

Saturday, 30 July	Ross County	2–1	Queen's Park	Victoria Park
15:00	McMenamin 58'; Flynn 75'		Daly 5'	Attendance: 949; Referee: McDermott

=== Second round ===
The Second round draw took place at 1:00pm on Tuesday 2 August at the Highland Football Academy, Dingwall. The ties are due to be played on Tuesday 23/ Wednesday 24 August 2011.

23 August	Hibernian	5–0	Berwick Rangers	Easter Road, Edinburgh
19:45	Scott 11', 58'; Sodje 38'; O'Connor 51'; Sproule 87'			Attendance: 4,936; Referee: Stephen Finnie

23 August	East Fife	2–1	Dunfermline Athletic	Bayview Stadium, Methil
19:45	Linn 4'; Dalziel 54'		Buchanan 12'	Attendance: 1,262; Referee: Craig Charleston

24 August	St Johnstone	3–0	Livingston	McDiarmid Park, Perth
19:45	Wright 13'; Sandaza 18', 25'			Attendance: 2,439; Referee: Steve Conroy

23 August	Airdrie United	2–0	Raith Rovers	New Broomfield, Airdrie
19:45	Holmes 27'; Donnelly 41'			Attendance: 683; Referee: George Salmond

24 August	Falkirk	3–1	Stenhousemuir	Falkirk Stadium, Falkirk
19:30	Ferguson 47' (o.g.); Sibbald 49'; El Alagui 90+1'		Paton 25'	Attendance: 2,134; Referee: Alan Muir

24 August	Ayr United	1–0	Inverness Caledonian Thistle	Somerset Park, Ayr
19:30	Malone 60'			Attendance: 987; Referee: Brian Winter

23 August	Queen of the South	3–0	Forfar Athletic	Palmerston Park, Dumfries
19:45	Brighton 29'; Johnston 58'; Clark 61'			Attendance: 1,008; Referee: Collum

23 August	Greenock Morton	3–4	St Mirren	Cappielow, Greenock
19:30	Tidser 17'; MacDonald 27'; Jackson 79'		Teale 8'; Thompson 55', 66'; Hasselbaink 60' (pen.)	Attendance: 4,959; Referee: Murray

23 August	Hamilton Academical	1–2	Ross County	New Douglas Park, Hamilton
19:45	Chambers 2' (pen.)		Gardyne 65'; Craig 82'	Attendance: 828; Referee: Tumilty

24 August	Clyde	0–4	Motherwell	Broadwood Stadium, Cumbernauld
19:45			Higdon 17'; Law 41'; Hateley 51'; Lawless 85'	Attendance: 1,778; Referee: Richmond

23 August	Aberdeen	1–0	Dundee	Pittodrie Stadium, Aberdeen
19:45	Mackie 16'			Attendance: 5,722; Referee: McKendrick

=== Third round ===
The Third round draw was conducted on Monday 29 August. The top 5 teams of last years Scottish Premier League will join the 11 winners from the second round. The 8 ties will be played on 20/21 September.

Seeded Teams: Aberdeen, Celtic, Dundee United, Heart of Midlothian, Kilmarnock, Motherwell and Rangers and St Johnstone.

Unseeded Teams: Airdrie United, Ayr United, East Fife, Falkirk, Hibernian, Queen of the South, Ross County and St Mirren

20 September 2011	St Johnstone	0–2	St Mirren	McDiarmid Park
19:45			Adams 39' (o.g.); Goodwin 45'	Attendance: 2,296; Referee: Craig Thomson

21 September 2011	Ross County	0–2	Celtic	Victoria Park
19:15			Hooper 13'; Boyd 51' (o.g.)	Attendance: 5,367; Referee: Calum Murray

20 September 2011	Kilmarnock	5–0	Queen of the South	Rugby Park
19:45	Harkins 2'; Heffernan 41', 59', 70'; Hutchinson 74'			Attendance: 3,091; Referee: Steven O'Reilly

21 September 2011	Falkirk	3–2	Rangers	Falkirk Stadium
19:45	El Alagui 58', 73'; Millar 90+3'		Goian 83'; Jelavić 87'	Attendance: 6,493; Referee: Brian Winter

20 September 2011	Motherwell	2–2 (a.e.t.) (6–7 p)	Hibernian	Fir Park
19:45	Lasley 30'; Higdon 40'		O'Connor 19', 87'	Attendance: 3,909; Referee: Willie Collum

21 September 2011	Ayr United	1–1 (a.e.t.) (4–1 p)	Heart of Midlothian	Somerset Park
19:45	Wardlaw 63'		Robinson 49'

20 September 2011	Aberdeen	3–3 (a.e.t.) (3–4 p)	East Fife	Pittodrie
19:45	McArdle 40'; Mackie 47'; Fallon 90+2'		Wallace 31'; Park 54'; Floan 57'	Attendance: 3,964; Referee: Steven Mclean

20 September 2011	Airdrie United	0–2	Dundee United	Excelsior Stadium
19:45			Dow 11'; Daly 76'	Attendance: 1,252; Referee: Madden

=== Quarter-finals ===
The Quarter-finals draw was conducted on Thursday 22 September. The 4 ties will be played on 25/26 October.

25 October 2011	Dundee United	2–2 (a.e.t.) (4–5 p)	Falkirk	Tannadice Park
19:45	Russell 73'; Daly 96'	Report	El Alagui 70'; Graham 118'	Attendance: 4,188; Referee: Calum Murray
	Penalties
	Russell (penalty scored); Daly (penalty scored); Flood (penalty missed); Douglas (penalty scored); Gunning (penalty scored)		Fulton (penalty scored); El Alagui (penalty scored); Weatherston (penalty scored); Higginbotham (penalty scored); Murdoch (penalty scored)

25 October 2011	Kilmarnock	2–0	East Fife	Rugby Park
19:45	Sissoko 73'; Harkins 81'	Report	Ogleby (yellow card) 45' (red card)	Attendance: 4,029; Referee: Mike Tumilty

25 October 2011	St Mirren	0–1	Ayr United	St Mirren Park
19:45		Report	Smith 81'	Attendance: 4,570; Referee: Stevie O'Reilly

26 October 2011	Hibernian	1–4	Celtic	Easter Road
19:15	Majstorović 4' (o.g.); Sproule (yellow card) 72' (red card)	Report	Forrest 46', 58'; Stokes 64'; Hooper 69'	Referee: William Collum

=== Semi-finals ===
The draw for the semi-finals took place at Hampden Park on 1 November 2011 at 2pm. Celtic beat Falkirk 3–1, while Ayr United took on Kilmarnock in an historic Ayrshire derby. Kilmarnock won 1–0. The Ayrshire derby was the first such game to take place in such a late stage of a major tournament.

28 January 2012	Ayr United	0–1 (a.e.t.)	Kilmarnock	Hampden Park
13:00		BBC Sport	Shiels 109'	Attendance: 25,057; Referee: Steven McLean

29 January 2012	Falkirk	1–3	Celtic	Hampden Park
15:00	Fulton 40'	BBC Sport	Brown 27' (pen.); Stokes 56', 86'	Attendance: 30,000; Referee: Euan Norris

=== Final ===
18 March 2012	Celtic	0–1	Kilmarnock	Hampden Park
15:00		Report	Van Tornhout 84'	Attendance: 49,572; Referee: William Collum
