= 2011–12 Falkirk F.C. season =

Falkirk
2011–12 season
- Chairman: Martin Ritchie
- Manager: Steven Pressley
- Stadium: Falkirk Stadium
- Scottish First Division: Third place
- Scottish Cup: Fifth round, lost to Ayr United
- League Cup: Semi-final, lost to Celtic
- Challenge Cup: Winners
- Top goalscorer: League: Farid El Alagui (18); All: Farid El Alagui (28)
- Highest home attendance: 4,383 vs. Ross County, 25 December 2011
- Lowest home attendance: 2,461 vs. Hamilton Academical, 10 April 2012
- Average home league attendance: 3,188
| Home colours | Away colours |

The 2011–12 season was Falkirk's second consecutive season in the Scottish First Division, having been relegated from the Scottish Premier League at the end of season 2009–10. Falkirk also competed in the Challenge Cup, League Cup and the Scottish Cup.

== Summary ==
Falkirk finished third in the First Division. They reached the semi-final of the League Cup, the fifth round of the Scottish Cup, and won the Challenge Cup beating Hamilton 1–0 in the final.

== Results and fixtures ==
Win Draw Loss Postponed

=== Preseason ===
| 2 July 2011 Friendly | Alloa Athletic | 2–4 | Falkirk | Alloa |
| | Trialist 48'; Trialist 74' | Falkirk Report | One 28' (o.g.); Higginbotham 31'; Trialist 38'; McManus 51' | Stadium: Recreation Park; Referee: Hilland |

| 5 July 2011 Friendly (Closed-doors) | Falkirk | 2–5 | Dundee United | Falkirk |
| | Higginbotham 80'; Trialist 82' | Falkirk Report | Watson 10', 22', 45'; Goodwillie 14'; Russell 16' | Stadium: Falkirk Stadium |

| 8 July 2011 Friendly | Inverurie Loco Works | 1–1 | Falkirk | Inverurie |
| | Coull 16' | Falkirk Report | Winters 15' | Stadium: Harlaw Park |

| 9 July 2011 Friendly | Peterhead | 2–0 | Falkirk | Peterhead |
| | McAllister 18', 30' | Falkirk Report | | Stadium: Balmoor Stadium |

| 13 July 2011 Friendly | Falkirk | 0–2 | Leeds United | Falkirk |
| | | Falkirk Report | Scobbie 36' (o.g.); Snodgrass 56' | Stadium: Falkirk Stadium; Attendance: 2065; Referee: Charleston |

| 16 July 2011 Friendly | Falkirk | 2–2 | Preston North End | Falkirk |
| | Alston 1'; Flynn 67' | Falkirk FC Report | Proctor 82' (pen.); McLaughlin 88' | Stadium: Falkirk Stadium; Attendance: 901; Referee: Finnie |

| 19 July 2011 Friendly | Falkirk | 1–1 | Hibernian | Falkirk |
| | Bennett 3' | Falkirk FC Report | Hanlon 79' | Stadium: Falkirk Stadium; Attendance: 1,611; Referee: Madden |

=== Scottish First Division ===
| 6 August 2011 | Raith Rovers | 1–0 | Falkirk | Kirkcaldy |
| | Hamill 45' | BBC Sport | Dods (yellow card) 89' (red card) | Stadium: Stark's Park; Attendance: 2,695; Referee: Richmond |

| 13 August 2011 | Falkirk | 2–1 | Partick Thistle | Falkirk |
| | El Alagui 8'; Higginbotham 50' | BBC Sport | Doolan 36' | Stadium: Falkirk Stadium; Attendance: 3,036; Referee: Allan |

| 20 August 2011 | Ayr United | 2–2 | Falkirk | Ayr |
| | Wardlaw 29'; Malone 60'; Campbell (yellow card) 73' (red card) | BBC Sport | Higginbotham 8'; El Alagui 44' | Stadium: Somerset Park; Attendance: 1,938; Referee: Finnie |

| 27 August 2011 | Falkirk | 1–1 | Ross County | Falkirk |
| | El Alagui 87' | BBC Sport | Craig 75' | Stadium: Falkirk Stadium; Attendance: 3,009; Referee: Tumilty |

| 10 September 2011 | Livingston | 1–1 | Falkirk | Livingston |
| | Russell 70' | BBC Sport | Murdoch (red card) 38'; Millar 90' (pen.); Higginbotham (red card) 90' | Stadium: Braidwood Motor Company Stadium; Attendance: 2,229; Referee: Thomson |

| 17 September 2011 | Falkirk | 2–1 | Dundee | Falkirk |
| | Weatherston 79'; El Alagui 86' | BBC Sport | Milne 45' | Stadium: Falkirk Stadium; Attendance: 3,576; Referee: McLean |

| 24 September 2011 | Greenock Morton | 3–2 | Falkirk | Greenock |
| | MacDonald 6', 54' (pen.); Jackson 58' | BBC Sport | Weatherston 17'; Alston 24' | Stadium: Cappielow Park; Attendance: 2,621; Referee: Allan |

| 1 October 2011 | Hamilton Academical | 0–1 | Falkirk | Hamilton |
| | | BBC Sport | El Alagui 39' | Stadium: New Douglas Park; Attendance: 2,367; Referee: Norris |

| 15 October 2011 | Falkirk | 1–0 | Queen of the South | Falkirk |
| | Dods 90+5' | BBC Sport | | Stadium: Falkirk Stadium; Attendance: 3,094; Referee: Beaton |

| 22 October 2011 | Partick Thistle | 2–2 | Falkirk | Glasgow |
| | Rowson 48'; Erskine 90' | BBC Sport | El Alagui 35'; Higginbotham 85' | Stadium: Firhill Stadium; Attendance: 2,851; Referee: Collum |

| 29 October 2011 | Falkirk | 2–0 | Raith Rovers | Falkirk |
| | Alston 77'; Dods 82' | BBC Sport | | Stadium: Falkirk Stadium; Attendance: 3,628; Referee: Conroy |

| 5 November 2011 | Falkirk | 4–3 | Livingston | Falkirk |
| | El Alagui 12'; Wallace 17'; Brown 39' (o.g.); Weatherston 85' | BBC Sport | Barr 56'; Kn. Jacobs 62'; Fotheringham 78' | Stadium: Falkirk Stadium; Attendance: 3,691; Referee: Colvin |

| 12 November 2011 | Ross County | 3–1 | Falkirk | Dingwall |
| | Kettlewell 4'; Gardyne 52'; Miller 83' | BBC Sport | Wallace 10' | Stadium: Victoria Park; Attendance: 4,108; Referee: Somers |

| 26 November 2011 | Dundee | 4–2 | Falkirk | Dundee |
| | Rae 8'; Hyde 11', 67'; Milne 85' | SFL Report | Weston 35' (o.g.); Fulton 74' | Stadium: Dens Park; Attendance: 4,507; Referee: Conroy |

| 3 December 2011 | Falkirk | 1–0 | Greenock Morton | Falkirk |
| | El Alagui 58' | BBC Sport | | Stadium: Falkirk Stadium; Attendance: 3,114; Referee: Brines |

| 10 December 2011 | Falkirk | 0–0 | Hamilton Academical | Falkirk |
| | | SFL Report | | Stadium: Falkirk Stadium; Attendance: 3,024; Referee: Thomson |

| 17 December 2011 | Queen of the South | 1–5 | Falkirk | Dumfries |
| | McLaughlin 34' | SFL Report | Sibbald 43', 77'; El Alagui 73', 86'; Higginbotham 81' | Stadium: Palmerston Park; Attendance: 1,466; Referee: Colvin |

| 26 December 2011 | Falkirk | 1–1 | Ross County | Falkirk |
| | Duffie 77' | SFL Report | McMenamin 90' | Stadium: Falkirk Stadium; Attendance: 4,383; Referee: Richmond |

| 2 January 2012 | Livingston | 1–2 | Falkirk | Livingston |
| | McNulty 66' | BBC Sport | El Alagui 12'; Higginbotham 72' | Stadium: Braidwood Motor Company Stadium; Attendance: 2,967; Referee: Winter |

| 14 January 2012 | Falkirk | 0–0 | Ayr United | Falkirk |
| | | BBC Sport | | Stadium: Falkirk Stadium; Attendance: 3,091; Referee: Collum |

| 21 January 2012 | Raith Rovers | 2–2 | Falkirk | Kirkcaldy |
| | Murray 27'; Baird 33' | BBC Sport | El Alagui 36'; Dods 63' | Stadium: Stark's Park; Attendance: 2,026; Referee: Beaton |

| 28 January 2012 | Falkirk | P – P | Dundee | Falkirk |
| | | | | Stadium: Falkirk Stadium |

| 11 February 2012 | Greenock Morton | 0–0 | Falkirk | Greenock |
| | | SFL Report | | Stadium: Cappielow Park; Attendance: 1,757; Referee: Madden |

| 18 February 2012 | Hamilton Academical | 0–1 | Falkirk | Hamilton |
| | | SFL Report | Dods 45' | Stadium: New Douglas Park; Attendance: 1,843; Referee: McLean |

| 21 February 2012 | Falkirk | 1–1 | Dundee | Falkirk |
| | El Alagui 27' | SFL Report | Finnigan 87' | Stadium: Falkirk Stadium; Attendance: 3,089; Referee: Richmond |

| 25 February 2012 | Falkirk | 3–0 | Queen of the South | Falkirk |
| | El Alagui 35'; Gibson 36'; Dods 79' | SFL Report | | Stadium: Falkirk Stadium; Attendance: 2,982; Referee: Finnie |

| 3 March 2012 | Ayr United | 1–0 | Falkirk | Ayr |
| | Geggan 78' | BBC Sport | | Stadium: Somerset Park; Attendance: 1,621; Referee: McKendrick |

| 10 March 2012 | Falkirk | 1–1 | Partick Thistle | Falkirk |
| | Millar 52' (pen.); Duffie (red card) 56' | SFL Report | Cairney 45' | Stadium: Falkirk Stadium; Attendance: 3,257; Referee: Collum |

| 17 March 2012 | Ross County | 2–1 | Falkirk | Dingwall |
| | Brittain 19' (pen.); Quinn 25' | SFL Report | McGovern (red card) 16'; Millar 62'; El Alagui (yellow card) 82' (red card) | Stadium: Victoria Park; Attendance: 2,200; Referee: Brines |

| 20 March 2012 | Falkirk | 0–2 | Greenock Morton | Falkirk |
| | | SFL Report | Tidser 56'; Campbell 82' | Stadium: Falkirk Stadium; Attendance: 2,538; Referee: Norris |

| 24 March 2012 | Falkirk | 2–5 | Livingston | Falkirk |
| | El Alagui 29'; Weatherston 79' | BBC Sport | Boulding 36', 41'; B. Barr 71', 84'; Russell 74' (pen.) | Stadium: Falkirk Stadium; Attendance: 2,939; Referee: Somers |

| 7 April 2012 | Dundee | 3–1 | Falkirk | Dundee |
| | O'Donnell 11'; Conroy 36' (pen.); Milne 57' | SFL Report | Millar 24' | Stadium: Dens Park; Attendance: 3,896; Referee: Thomson |

| 10 April 2012 | Falkirk | 3–0 | Hamilton Academical | Falkirk |
| | Millar 58' (pen.), 60'; El Alagui 81' | SFL Report | Hutton (red card) 56' | Stadium: Falkirk Stadium; Attendance: 2,461; Referee: Allan |

| 14 April 2012 | Queen of the South | 0–0 | Falkirk | Dumfries |
| | | BBC Sport | | Stadium: Palmerston Park; Attendance: 1,446; Referee: Brines |

| 21 April 2012 | Falkirk | 2–3 | Raith Rovers | Falkirk |
| | El Alagui 9'; Alston 68' | SFL Report | Graham 24' (pen.), 45', 69' | Stadium: Falkirk Stadium; Attendance: 3,024; Referee: Madden |

| 28 April 2012 | Partick Thistle | 1–1 | Falkirk | Glasgow |
| | McGuigan 24' | SFL Report | Alston 71' | Stadium: Firhill Stadium; Attendance: 2,586; Referee: O'Reilly |

| 5 May 2012 | Falkirk | 3–2 | Ayr United | Falkirk |
| | Scobbie 7' (pen.); El Alagui 56'; Alston 63' | BBC Sport | Moffat 51', 81' | Stadium: Falkirk Stadium; Attendance: 3,445; Referee: Tumilty |

=== Scottish Challenge Cup ===
| 23 July 2011 First round | Brechin City | 1–2 | Falkirk | Brechin |
| | McKenna 40' | BBC Sport | Bennett 26'; Dods 33' | Stadium: Glebe Park; Attendance: 596; Referee: Salmond |

| 9 August 2011 Second round | Falkirk | 1–0 | Dundee | Falkirk |
| | El Alagui 43' | BBC Sport | | Stadium: Falkirk Stadium; Attendance: 1,791; Referee: Winter |

| 4 September 2011 Quarter-final | East Fife | 1–4 | Falkirk | Methil |
| | Wallace 27' | BBC Sport | Millar 42'; Higginbotham 52', 87'; Sibbald 54' | Stadium: Bayview Stadium; Attendance: 1,064; Referee: Colvin |

| 9 October 2011 Semi-final | Annan Athletic | 0–3 | Falkirk | Annan |
| | | BBC Sport | Millar 10'; El Alagui 25', 42' | Stadium: Galabank; Attendance: 1,575; Referee: Salmond |

| 1 April 2012 Final | Falkirk | 1–0 | Hamilton Academical | Livingston |
| | Dods 2' | BBC Sport | | Stadium: Almondvale Stadium; Attendance: 5,210; Referee: Winter |

=== Scottish League Cup ===
| 30 July 2011 First round | Albion Rovers | 2–4 | Falkirk | Coatbridge |
| | Chaplain 33' (pen.); Boyle 90+2' | BBC Sport | El Alagui 15', 67'; Fulton 50'; Higginbotham 69' | Stadium: Cliftonhill; Attendance: 602; Referee: Tumilty |

| 24 August 2011 Second round | Falkirk | 3–1 | Stenhousemuir | Falkirk |
| | Ferguson 47' (o.g.); Sibbald 49'; El Alagui 90' | BBC Sport | Paton 25' | Stadium: Falkirk Stadium; Attendance: 2,134; Referee: Muir |

| 21 September 2011 Third round | Falkirk | 3–2 | Rangers | Falkirk |
| | El Alagui 58', 73'; Millar 90+3' | BBC Sport | Goian 83'; Jelavić 87' | Stadium: Falkirk Stadium; Attendance: 6,493; Referee: Winter |

| 25 October 2011 Quarter-final | Dundee United | 2–2 (a.e.t.) (4–5 p) | Falkirk | Dundee |
| | Russell 73'; Daly 96' | BBC Sport | El Alagui 70'; Graham 118' | Stadium: Tannadice Park; Attendance: 4,188; Referee: Murray |

| 29 January 2012 Semi-final | Falkirk | 1–3 | Celtic | Glasgow |
| | Fulton 40' | BBC Sport | Brown 27' (pen.); Stokes 56', 86' | Stadium: Hampden Park; Attendance: 30,000; Referee: Norris |

=== Scottish Cup ===
| 7 January 2012 Fourth round | Falkirk | 2–0 | East Fife | Falkirk |
| | Dods 7'; El Alagui 21' | BBC Sport | | Stadium: Falkirk Stadium; Attendance: 2,475; Referee: McKendrick |

| 4 February 2012 Fifth round | Ayr United | P–P | Falkirk | Ayr |
| | | BBC Sport | | Stadium: Somerset Park |

| 15 February 2012 Fifth round | Ayr United | 2–1 | Falkirk | Ayr |
| | Geggan 19'; Roberts 57' (pen.) | BBC Sport | Alston 6' | Stadium: Somerset Park; Attendance: 1,873; Referee: Allan |

== Player statistics ==
=== Captains ===
| No. | P | Name | Country | No. games | Notes |
|---|---|---|---|---|---|
| | DF | Darren Dods | (Scotland) | 46 | Club captain |

Last updated: 5 May 2012
Source: Competitive match reports.
Competitive matches only
Matches started as captain only
Country: FIFA nationality; No.: Squad number; P: Position; Name: Player name; No. Games: Number of games started as captain.

=== Squad ===
Last updated 5 May 2012

| No. | Pos | Nat | Player | Total | | First Division | | Scottish Cup | | League Cup | | Challenge Cup | |
| No. | Pos | Nat | Player | Apps | Goals | Apps | Goals | Apps | Goals | Apps | Goals | Apps | Goals |
|---|---|---|---|---|---|---|---|---|---|---|---|---|---|
| | GK | (Northern Ireland) NIR | Michael McGovern | 47 | 0 | 35+0 | 0 | 2+0 | 0 | 5+0 | 0 | 5+0 | 0 |
| | GK | (Scotland) SCO | Graham Bowman | 2 | 0 | 1+1 | 0 | 0+0 | 0 | 0+0 | 0 | 0+0 | 0 |
| | DF | (Scotland) SCO | Tam Scobbie | 41 | 1 | 30+0 | 1 | 2+0 | 0 | 4+0 | 0 | 5+0 | 0 |
| | DF | (Scotland) SCO | Darren Dods | 46 | 8 | 34+0 | 5 | 2+0 | 1 | 5+0 | 0 | 5+0 | 2 |
| | DF | (Scotland) SCO | Kieran Duffie | 41 | 1 | 30+0 | 1 | 2+0 | 0 | 5+0 | 0 | 4+0 | 0 |
| | DF | (Scotland) SCO | Stephen Kingsley | 17 | 0 | 8+7 | 0 | 0+0 | 0 | 1+0 | 0 | 1+0 | 0 |
| | DF | (England) ENG | Rhys Bennett | 26 | 1 | 8+10 | 0 | 0+1 | 0 | 3+0 | 0 | 3+1 | 1 |
| | DF | (Scotland) SCO | Steven Brisbane | 2 | 0 | 0+2 | 0 | 0+0 | 0 | 0+0 | 0 | 0+0 | 0 |
| | DF | (Scotland) SCO | Murray Wallace | 42 | 2 | 32+2 | 2 | 2+0 | 0 | 3+0 | 0 | 3+0 | 0 |
| | DF | (Scotland) SCO | Liam Dick | 2 | 0 | 0+1 | 0 | 0+0 | 0 | 0+1 | 0 | 0+0 | 0 |
| | MF | (Scotland) SCO | Blair Alston | 33 | 6 | 14+10 | 5 | 1+1 | 1 | 1+2 | 0 | 1+3 | 0 |
| | MF | (Scotland) SCO | Jay Fulton | 42 | 3 | 23+9 | 1 | 0+1 | 0 | 5+0 | 2 | 3+1 | 0 |
| | MF | (Scotland) SCO | Mark Millar | 43 | 9 | 33+0 | 6 | 1+0 | 0 | 4+0 | 1 | 5+0 | 2 |
| | MF | (Scotland) SCO | Stewart Murdoch | 36 | 0 | 25+1 | 0 | 2+0 | 0 | 4+0 | 0 | 4+0 | 0 |
| | MF | (Scotland) SCO | Dale Fulton | 13 | 0 | 4+2 | 0 | 0+1 | 0 | 0+3 | 0 | 0+3 | 0 |
| | MF | (Scotland) SCO | Ryan Millar | 6 | 0 | 1+4 | 0 | 1+0 | 0 | 0+0 | 0 | 0+0 | 0 |
| | MF | (Scotland) SCO | Willie Gibson | 14 | 1 | 10+2 | 1 | 1+0 | 0 | 0+0 | 0 | 1+0 | 0 |
| | MF | (Scotland) SCO | Kristopher Faulds | 9 | 0 | 4+5 | 0 | 0+0 | 0 | 0+0 | 0 | 0+0 | 0 |
| | FW | (Scotland) SCO | David Weatherston | 34 | 4 | 25+2 | 4 | 1+0 | 0 | 3+0 | 0 | 3+0 | 0 |
| | FW | (England) ENG | Kallum Higginbotham | 29 | 8 | 20+0 | 5 | 1+0 | 0 | 4+0 | 1 | 4+0 | 2 |
| | FW | (Morocco) MAR | Farid El Alagui | 44 | 28 | 33+0 | 18 | 2+0 | 1 | 5+0 | 6 | 4+0 | 3 |
| | FW | (Scotland) SCO | Craig Sibbald | 37 | 4 | 22+4 | 2 | 2+0 | 0 | 3+1 | 1 | 4+1 | 1 |
| | FW | (Scotland) SCO | Ally Graham | 5 | 1 | 0+3 | 0 | 0+0 | 0 | 0+2 | 1 | 0+0 | 0 |
| | FW | (Scotland) SCO | Jordan White | 12 | 0 | 4+6 | 0 | 0+1 | 0 | 0+1 | 0 | 0+0 | 0 |

=== Disciplinary record ===
Includes all competitive matches.

Last updated 5 May 2012

| Nation | Position | Name | Scottish First Division | | Scottish Cup | | League Cup | | Challenge Cup | | Total | |
| Nation | Position | Name | Yellow card | Red card | Yellow card | Red card | Yellow card | Red card | Yellow card | Red card | Yellow card | Red card |
| (Northern Ireland) | GK | Michael McGovern | 0 | 1 | 0 | 0 | 0 | 0 | 0 | 0 | 0 | 1 |
| (Scotland) | GK | Graham Bowman | 0 | 0 | 0 | 0 | 0 | 0 | 0 | 0 | 0 | 0 |
| (Scotland) | DF | Tam Scobbie | 4 | 0 | 0 | 0 | 1 | 0 | 0 | 0 | 5 | 0 |
| (Scotland) | DF | Darren Dods | 9 | 1 | 0 | 0 | 1 | 0 | 0 | 0 | 10 | 1 |
| (Scotland) | DF | Kieran Duffie | 5 | 1 | 0 | 0 | 1 | 0 | 2 | 0 | 8 | 1 |
| (Scotland) | DF | Stephen Kingsley | 0 | 0 | 0 | 0 | 0 | 0 | 0 | 0 | 0 | 0 |
| (England) | DF | Rhys Bennett | 3 | 0 | 0 | 0 | 2 | 0 | 0 | 0 | 5 | 0 |
| (Scotland) | DF | Steven Brisbane | 0 | 0 | 0 | 0 | 0 | 0 | 0 | 0 | 0 | 0 |
| (Scotland) | DF | Murray Wallace | 2 | 0 | 1 | 0 | 0 | 0 | 0 | 0 | 3 | 0 |
| (Scotland) | DF | Liam Dick | 0 | 0 | 0 | 0 | 0 | 0 | 0 | 0 | 0 | 0 |
| (Scotland) | MF | Blair Alston | 1 | 0 | 0 | 0 | 0 | 0 | 0 | 0 | 1 | 0 |
| (Scotland) | MF | Jay Fulton | 3 | 0 | 0 | 0 | 0 | 0 | 0 | 0 | 3 | 0 |
| (Scotland) | MF | Mark Millar | 8 | 0 | 1 | 0 | 3 | 0 | 0 | 0 | 12 | 0 |
| (Scotland) | MF | Stewart Murdoch | 2 | 1 | 0 | 0 | 2 | 0 | 2 | 0 | 6 | 1 |
| (Scotland) | MF | Dale Fulton | 1 | 0 | 0 | 0 | 1 | 0 | 0 | 0 | 2 | 0 |
| (Scotland) | MF | Willie Gibson | 2 | 0 | 0 | 0 | 0 | 0 | 0 | 0 | 2 | 0 |
| (Scotland) | MF | Kristopher Faulds | 0 | 0 | 0 | 0 | 0 | 0 | 0 | 0 | 0 | 0 |
| (Scotland) | FW | David Weatherston | 0 | 0 | 0 | 0 | 0 | 0 | 0 | 0 | 0 | 0 |
| (England) | FW | Kallum Higginbotham | 0 | 1 | 0 | 0 | 1 | 0 | 2 | 0 | 3 | 1 |
| (Morocco) | FW | Farid El Alagui | 13 | 1 | 0 | 0 | 1 | 0 | 2 | 0 | 16 | 1 |
| (Scotland) | FW | Craig Sibbald | 2 | 0 | 0 | 0 | 0 | 0 | 1 | 0 | 3 | 0 |
| (Scotland) | FW | Ally Graham | 0 | 0 | 0 | 0 | 0 | 0 | 0 | 0 | 0 | 0 |
| (Scotland) | FW | Jordan White | 2 | 0 | 1 | 0 | 0 | 0 | 0 | 0 | 3 | 0 |

=== Awards ===
Last updated 5 May 2012

| Nation | Name | Award | Month |
|---|---|---|---|
| (Scotland) | Craig Sibbald | Young Player of the Month | August |
| (Scotland) | Steven Pressley | First Division Manager of the Month | September |
| (Morocco) | Farid El Alagui | Player of the Month | September |
| (Scotland) | Steven Pressley | First Division Manager of the Month (shared) | October |
| (Scotland) | Darren Dods | Player of the Month (shared) | October |
| (Morocco) | Farid El Alagui | Player of the Month | December |
| (Scotland) | Steven Pressley | First Division Manager of the Month | January |
| (Scotland) | Steven Pressley | First Division Manager of the Month | February |

== League table ==
| Pos | Team | Pld | W | D | L | GF | GA | GD | Pts | Promotion, qualification or relegation |
|---|---|---|---|---|---|---|---|---|---|---|
| 1 | Ross County (C, P) | 36 | 22 | 13 | 1 | 72 | 32 | +40 | 79 | Promotion to the Premier League |
| 2 | Dundee (P) | 36 | 15 | 10 | 11 | 53 | 43 | +10 | 55 (Note: Dundee were chosen to take the place of Rangers.) | Promotion to the Premier League |
| 3 | Falkirk | 36 | 13 | 13 | 10 | 53 | 48 | +5 | 52 | |
| 4 | Hamilton Academical | 36 | 14 | 7 | 15 | 55 | 56 | −1 | 49 | |
| 5 | Livingston | 36 | 13 | 9 | 14 | 56 | 54 | +2 | 48 | |

Source: SPFL Archive
Rules for classification: 1) points; 2) goal difference; 3) number of goals scored.
(C) Champions; (P) Promoted

== Transfers ==
Falkirk started the season by releasing Eighteen Players.

=== Players in ===
| Player | From | Fee |
|---|---|---|
| (Scotland) Darren Dods | (Scotland) Dundee United | Free |
| (Northern Ireland) Michael McGovern | (Scotland) Ross County | Free |
| (England) Rhys Bennett | (England) Bolton Wanderers | Loan |
| (Morocco) Farid El Alagui | (France) Romorantin | Free |
| (Scotland) David Weatherston | (Scotland) Queen of the South | Free |
| (Scotland) Jordan White | (Scotland) Clyde | Free |
| (Scotland) Murray Wallace | (England) Huddersfield Town | Loan |
| (Scotland) Willie Gibson | (England) Crawley Town | Free |

=== Players out ===
| Player | To | Fee |
|---|---|---|
| (Scotland) Lewis Bonar | (Scotland) Stirling Albion | Free |
| (England) Carl Finnigan | (Scotland) St Johnstone | Free |
| (Scotland) Scott Davidson | (Scotland) Stirling Albion | Loan |
| (Scotland) Mark Stewart | (England) Bradford City | Free |
| (Scotland) Chris Mitchell | (England) Bradford City | Free |
| (Austria) Bobby Olejnik | (England) Torquay United | Free |
| (Scotland) Marc Twaddle | (England) Rochdale | Free |
| (Scotland) Ryan Flynn | (England) Sheffield United | Undisclosed |
| (England) Jack Compton | (England) Bradford City | Loan |
| (Scotland) Michael Andrews | (Scotland) Montrose | Free |
| (Scotland) Jamie Barclay | (England) Berwick Rangers | Free |
| (Scotland) Craig McLeish | (Scotland) Stirling Albion | Free |
| (Morocco) Mehdi Khalis | (France) Drancy | Free |
| (Northern Ireland) Brian McLean | (England) Preston North End | Free |
| (Scotland) Burton O'Brien | Free Agent | Free |
| (Portugal) Pedro Moutinho | (Romania) Brașov | Free |
| (Scotland) Tam McManus | (Scotland) Ayr United | Free |
| (Scotland) Euen Grant | Free Agent | Free |
| (Wales) James Bloom | (England) Gloucester City | Free |
| (Scotland) Keiran Stallard | (Scotland) Airdrie United | Free |
| (Scotland) Grant Santi | (Scotland) Alloa Athletic | Free |
| (Scotland) Joseph McCafferty | (Scotland) Stenhousemuir | Free |
| (Scotland) Gavin MacPherson | (Scotland) Stirling Albion | Free |
| (Scotland) Aaron Sekhon | (Scotland) Partick Thistle | Free |
| (Scotland) Ally Graham | (Scotland) Dumbarton | Loan |
| (Scotland) Scott Davidson | (Scotland) Stirling Albion | Free |
| (Scotland) Dale Fulton | (Scotland) Clyde | Loan |
| (Scotland) Murray Wallace | (England) Huddersfield Town | Undisclosed |
| (England) Kallum Higginbotham | (England) Huddersfield Town | Undisclosed |
