= 2011–12 Scottish Challenge Cup =

Tournament details
- Country: Scotland
- Teams: 32

Final positions
- Champions: Falkirk
- Runners-up: Hamilton Academical

Tournament statistics
- Matches played: 31
- Goals scored: 102 (3.29 per match)
- Top goal scorer(s): Paul di Giacomo (5 goals)

The 2011–12 Scottish Challenge Cup, known as the Ramsdens Challenge Cup due to sponsorship reasons with Ramsdens, was the 21st season of the competition. It was competed for by 32 clubs, which included the 30 members of the Scottish Football League, and for the first time the top two clubs of the Highland Football League.

The defending champions were Ross County, who defeated Queen of the South in the 2010 final but were knocked out in the first round by Third Division side Elgin City. The tournament winners were Falkirk, who defeated Hamilton Academical in the final with Darren Dods scoring the only goal of the match in the 2nd minute.

== Schedule ==
Round	First match date	Fixtures	Clubs
First round	Sat/Sun 23/24 July 2011	16	32 → 16
Second round	Tuesday 9 August 2011	8	16 → 8
Quarter-finals	Sunday 4 September 2011	4	8 → 4
Semi-finals	Sunday 9 October 2011	2	4 → 2
Final	Sunday 1 April 2012	1	2 → 1

== Fixtures and results ==
=== First round ===
The First round draw was conducted on 6 June 2011.

==== North and East region ====
23 July 2011	Deveronvale	1–3	Stirling Albion	Princess Royal Park, Banff
13:00	McKenzie 58'	Report	Bonar 19' (pen.), 48'; MacPherson 63'	Attendance: 400; Referee: Don Robertson

23 July 2011	Arbroath	1 – 2 (a.e.t.)	Dundee	Gayfield Park, Arbroath
15:00	Elfverson 77'	Report	Milne 79'; O'Donnell 92'	Attendance: 1,761; Referee: Craig Charleston

23 July 2011	Brechin City	1–2	Falkirk	Glebe Park, Brechin
15:00	McKenna 40'	Report	Bennett 26'; Dods 33'	Attendance: 596; Referee: George Salmond

23 July 2011	Forfar Athletic	1 – 1 (a.e.t.) (5–4 p)	Buckie Thistle	Station Park, Forfar
15:00	Gibson 29'	Report	MacMillan 33'	Attendance: 416; Referee: John Beaton

23 July 2011	Montrose	1–6	East Fife	Links Park, Montrose
15:00	McPhee 73'	Report	Linn 16'; Ogleby 27', 51', 63' (pen.); Wallace 31'; Young 64'	Attendance: 404

23 July 2011	Peterhead	2 – 2 (a.e.t.) (5–4 p)	Alloa Athletic	Balmoor, Peterhead
15:00	Deasley 30'; McAllister 60'	Report	Ro. McCord 16'; Wright 73'	Attendance: 443; Referee: Gary Hilland

23 July 2011	Raith Rovers	2–1	Cowdenbeath	Stark's Park, Kirkcaldy
15:00	Baird 51', 77'	Report	Coult 80'	Attendance: 1,098; Referee: Mike Tumilty

23 July 2011	Ross County	1–2	Elgin City	Victoria Park, Dingwall
15:00	Morrison 2'	Report	Cameron 37'; Leslie 61'	Attendance: 1,368; Referee: Matt Northcroft

Source: The Scottish Football League

==== South and West region ====
23 July 2011	Airdrie United	0–5	Livingston	New Broomfield, Airdrie
15:00		Report	Sinclair 50'; Russell 55', 67'; Barr 82', 90'	Attendance: 719; Referee: Charlie Richmond

23 July 2011	Albion Rovers	0–2	Annan Athletic	Cliftonhill, Coatbridge
15:00		Report	Cox 29'; Harty 81'	Attendance: 247; Referee: Des Roache

23 July 2011	Ayr United	2 – 0 (a.e.t.)	Queen of the South	Somerset Park, Ayr
15:00	Campbell 94'; Geggan 115'	Report		Attendance: 1,272; Referee: Brian Winter

23 July 2011	Clyde	2 – 2 (a.e.t.) (3–4 p)	Berwick Rangers	Broadwood Stadium, Cumbernauld
15:00	Fitzpatrick 36'; McDonald 51'	Report	L. Currie 4'; Gray 10'	Attendance: 472; Referee: Stevie O'Reilly

23 July 2011	Partick Thistle	2–1	Stenhousemuir	Firhill Stadium, Glasgow
15:00	Rowson 20'; Stewart 82'	Report	Kean 86'	Attendance: 1,292; Referee: Stephen Finnie

23 July 2011	Queen's Park	0–2	Hamilton Academical	Hampden Park, Glasgow
15:00		Report	Crawford 72'; Hopkirk 81'	Attendance: 748

23 July 2011	Stranraer	0–8	Greenock Morton	Stair Park, Stranraer
15:00		Report	Jackson 19', 42', 77', 86' di Giacomo 53', 54', 64', 69'	Attendance: 374; Referee: John McKendrick

24 July 2011	Dumbarton	3–2	East Stirlingshire	Strathclyde Homes Stadium, Dumbarton
15:00	Prunty 54'; Gilhaney 61' (pen.); Walker 90'; Lyden (red card) 67'	Report	Love 66'; Turner 70'	Attendance: 454; Referee: Paul Robertson

Source: The Scottish Football League

=== Second round ===
9 August 2011	Annan Athletic	4–2	Peterhead	Galabank, Annan
19:30	Harty 20', 48', 87'; Muirhead 31'	Report	Redman 49'; McAllister 75' (pen.)	Attendance: 359; Referee: Stephen Finnie

9 August 2011	Forfar Athletic	0–5	Greenock Morton	Station Park, Forfar
19:30		Report	O'Brien 56'; Weatherson 59'; MacDonald 61', 75'; Campbell 78'	Attendance: 448; Referee: Matt Northcroft

9 August 2011	Ayr United	3–0	Raith Rovers	Cappielow, Greenock
19:45	Patterson 43'; McKernan 76'; Robertson 79'	Report		Attendance: 227; Referee: Steve Conroy

9 August 2011	Dumbarton	0–2	Berwick Rangers	Strathclyde Homes Stadium, Dumbarton
19:45		Report	Greenhill 55'; Currie 89'	Attendance: 334; Referee: Craig Charleston

9 August 2011	East Fife	2–0	Elgin City	Bayview Stadium, Methil
19:45	Wallace 52', 77'	Report		Attendance: 408; Referee: Mike Tumilty

9 August 2011	Falkirk	1–0	Dundee	Falkirk Stadium, Falkirk
19:45	El Alagui 43'	Report		Attendance: 1,791; Referee: Brian Winter

9 August 2011	Hamilton Academical	1–0	Partick Thistle	New Douglas Park, Hamilton
19:45	Chambers 86' (pen.)	Report		Attendance: 1,362; Referee: Craig Thomson

9 August 2011	Livingston	5–0	Stirling Albion	Almondvale Stadium, Livingston
19:45	Deuchar 23', 34', 90'; Devon Jacobs 36' (o.g.); Gary Thom 87' (o.g.)	Report		Attendance: 549; Referee: Iain Brines

Last updated: 9 August 2011
Source: The Scottish Football League

=== Quarter-finals ===
The quarter-final draw was conducted on 11 August 2011 at 2:00pm in a Ramsdens outlet in The Forge Shopping Centre, Glasgow.

4 September 2011
15:00

Berwick Rangers	1–2	Livingston
McDonald 52'	Report	Scougall 12'; Russell 85'

Shielfield Park, Berwick-upon-Tweed
Attendance: 567
Referee: Beaton

4 September 2011
15:00

East Fife	1–4	Falkirk
Wallace 27'	Report	Millar 42'; Higginbotham 52' (87); Sibbald 54'

Bayview Stadium, Methil
Attendance: 1,064
Referee: Colvin

4 September 2011
15:00

Hamilton Academical	2–1	Greenock Morton
Spence 18'; Mensing 33'	Report	Di Giacomo 10'

New Douglas Park, Hamilton
Attendance: 1,496
Referee: O'Reilly

4 September 2011
15:00

Ayr United	0–1	Annan Athletic
	Report	Cox 58'

Somerset Park, Ayr
Attendance: 1,232
Referee: Charleston

=== Semi-finals ===
The draw for the semi-finals of the Challenge cup took place at 2:00 pm on 7 September 2011, at Hampden Park, Glasgow.

9 October 2011
15:00

Annan Athletic	0–3	Falkirk
	Report	Millar 10'; El Alagui 25', 42'

Galabank, Annan
Attendance: 1,575
Referee: Salmond

9 October 2011
15:00

Hamilton Academical	1–0	Livingston
McLaughlin 43'	Report

New Douglas Park, Hamilton
Attendance: 1,418
Referee: Richmond

=== Final ===
1 April 2012
16:05 BST

Falkirk	1–0	Hamilton Academical
Dods 2'	Report

Braidwood Motor Company Stadium, Livingston
Attendance: 5,210
Referee: Winter

== Top scorers ==
Last updated on 9 October 2011

#	Name	Club	Goals
1	Paul di Giacomo	Greenock Morton	5
2	Ian Harty	Annan Athletic	4
2	Andy Jackson	Greenock Morton	4
2	Ryan Wallace	East Fife	4
5	Kenny Deuchar	Livingston	3
5	Farid El Alagui	Falkirk	3
5	Robert Ogleby	East Fife	3
