= Graham Bowman =

Scottish footballer (born 1993)

Personal information
- Date of birth: 2 January 1993 (age 33)
- Place of birth: Falkirk, Scotland
- Position: Goalkeeper

Team information
- Current team: Brechin City

Senior career*
Years	Team	Apps	(Gls)
2012–2017	Falkirk	6	(0)
2016	→ Stenhousemuir (loan)	2	(0)
2017	Stenhousemuir	7	(0)
2017–2018	Albion Rovers	13	(0)
2019–	Brechin City	0	(0)
- * Club domestic league appearances and goals as of 20:02, 18 November 2017 (UTC)

Graham Bowman (born 2 January 1993) is a Scottish footballer, who plays for Brechin City as a goalkeeper. Bowman has also previously played for Falkirk, Stenhousemuir and Albion Rovers.

== Career ==
A member of Falkirk's under-19 squad, Bowman was promoted to the first team for season 2011–12 as cover for Michael McGovern. He was an unused substitute on 29 occasions, before making his debut as a 17th-minute substitute on 17 March 2012, against Ross County following the sending off of Michael McGovern. He made his first start the following week against Livingston.

Bowman signed for Stenhousemuir in March 2017, leaving at the end of the season to sign for Scottish League One side Albion Rovers on 2 June 2017.

== Career statistics ==
As of 18 November 2017

Club statistics
Club	Season	League		Scottish Cup		League Cup		Other		Total	
Club	Season	App	Goals	App	Goals	App	Goals	App	Goals	App	Goals
Falkirk	2011–12	2	0	0	0	0	0	0	0	2	0
Falkirk	2012–13	1	0	0	0	0	0	0	0	1	0
Falkirk	2013–14	2	0	0	0	0	0	0	0	2	0
Falkirk	2014–15	1	0	0	0	0	0	0	0	1	0
Falkirk	2015–16	0	0	0	0	0	0	1	0	1	0
Falkirk	Total	6	0	0	0	0	0	1	0	7	0
Stenhousemuir (loan)	2015–16	2	0	0	0	0	0	0	0	2	0
Stenhousemuir	2016–17	7	0	0	0	0	0	0	0	7	0
Stenhousemuir	Total	9	0	0	0	0	0	1	0	9	0
Albion Rovers	2017–18	13	0	1	0	4	0	0	0	18	0
Career total		28	0	1	0	4	0	1	0	34	0

== Honours ==
Falkirk

- Scottish Challenge Cup: 2011–12
