= Ryan Millar (footballer) =

Scottish footballer

Personal information
- Full name: Ryan Millar
- Place of birth: Scotland
- Position: Forward

Team information
- Current team: Stenhousemuir

Senior career*
Years	Team	Apps	(Gls)
2011–2012	Falkirk	5	(0)
2012–2013	Alloa Athletic	0	(0)
2014–	Stenhousemuir	0	(0)
- * Club domestic league appearances and goals as of 11 June 2014

Ryan Millar is a Scottish professional footballer, who played for Falkirk.

== Career ==
=== Falkirk ===
A member of Falkirk's Under 19 team Millar made his first team debut as a substitute in Falkirk's 2–1 win over Dundee in the Scottish First Division on 17 September 2011.

== Career statistics ==
As of 17 October 2011

Club statistics
Club	Season	League		Scottish Cup		League Cup		Other		Total	
Club	Season	App	Goals	App	Goals	App	Goals	App	Goals	App	Goals
Falkirk	2011-12 season	1	0	0	0	0	0	0	0	1	0
Total		1	0	0	0	0	0	0	0	1	0
