= Steve Fulton =

Scottish footballer

Personal information
- Full name: Stephen Fulton
- Date of birth: 10 August 1970 (age 56)
- Place of birth: Greenock, Scotland
- Position: Midfielder

Youth career
- Celtic Boys Club

Senior career*
Years	Team	Apps	(Gls)
1987–1993	Celtic	76	(2)
1993–1994	Bolton Wanderers	4	(0)
1994	→ Peterborough United (loan)	3	(0)
1994–1995	Falkirk	33	(3)
1995–2002	Heart of Midlothian	204	(15)
2002–2004	Kilmarnock	57	(4)
2004–2005	Partick Thistle	19	(0)
Total		396	(24)

International career
1990–1992	Scotland U21	7	(0)
1998	Scotland B	1	(0)
- * Club domestic league appearances and goals

Stephen Fulton (born 10 August 1970) is a Scottish retired footballer who played as a left-sided midfielder.

== Playing career ==
Fulton joined Celtic from their Boys Club in 1987 and made his league debut during the 1988–89 season. After his impressive display in a Scottish Cup semi-final defeat of Hibernian that year he was likened by his manager Billy McNeill to Italian forward Roberto Baggio, and the Baggio moniker stuck with him throughout his career. He had become a first-team regular by 1990 and helped the side to the 1990–91 League Cup final, where they suffered a 2–1 defeat to Old Firm rivals Rangers.

Fulton left Celtic Park in August 1993, Bolton Wanderers paying £225,000 for his signature. However, he fell from favour within months of his move to Burnden Park and spent part of the 1993–94 season on loan to Peterborough United before returning to Scotland at its conclusion, in a £100,000 move to Falkirk. The Bairns enjoyed a profitable first season back in the Premier Division, challenging for European qualification and eventually finishing fifth, only six points behind 2nd place Motherwell. Fulton re-established himself as a first-team player, playing 33 times during the campaign.

In July 1995, Jim Jefferies resigned as Falkirk manager to take-over at Heart of Midlothian and Fulton was one of the first players he signed for the Edinburgh club. The side had been near the bottom of the table at the time Fulton signed but recovered to finish 4th and reach the Scottish Cup Final, where Rangers proved too strong for them. He helped Hearts to the League Cup Final the following season and scored their first goal in the Celtic Park showpiece. Rangers were again the opposition and once again they had the measure of Hearts, two individual goals from Paul Gascoigne turning the match in the Glasgow side's favour.

In 1997–98, Hearts mounted an unexpected challenge for the league title, with Fulton in the vanguard. He was the only Hearts player to start every league game and his six goals from midfield led the side to an eventual third-place finish. They also reached the Scottish Cup Final for the second time in three years and ended a 36-year wait for silverware by defeating Rangers 2–1. Due to an injury to regular skipper Gary Locke, Fulton was appointed captain for the occasion and he set his side on the way to victory after he was brought down in the box to win a first minute penalty kick from which they took the lead. He had been shortlisted for the Scottish PFA Player of the Year in 1998.

Fulton earned his debut selection to the Scotland national team in September 1998, for a World Cup qualification match against Lithuania. His Hearts team-mate Neil McCann made his debut in that game but Fulton remained on the bench.

Jim Jefferies was by this stage Kilmarnock manager and he again moved to sign Fulton, offering him a two-year contract with the Ayrshire club. He finished his career with a season with Partick Thistle.

== Personal life ==
His sons Jay, Dale and Tyler are also professional footballers. Jay plying his trade now at Swansea City having all played together at Fulton's former club Falkirk respectively. Jay was born in Bolton during his father's short spell in England with Bolton Wanderers during the 1993–94 season.
