= David Weatherston =

Scottish footballer (born 1986)

Personal information
- Date of birth: 25 August 1986 (age 40)
- Place of birth: Paisley, Scotland
- Positions: Forward; winger

Youth career
- 1995–1997: Busby Boys Club
- 1997–2003: Queen's Park Boys Club

Senior career*
Years	Team	Apps	(Gls)
2003–2007	Queen's Park	80	(24)
2007–2008	St Johnstone	28	(0)
2008–2011	Queen of the South	79	(17)
2011–2013	Falkirk	51	(8)
2013–2014	Stirling Albion	29	(8)
2014–2015	Alloa Athletic	2	(0)
2015–2016	Brechin City	16	(2)
2016–2017	Verdal IL	22	(4)
2019	Verdal 2	6	(1)
Total		313	(64)
- * Club domestic league appearances and goals

David Weatherston (born 25 August 1986) is a Scottish retired professional footballer who played for Queen's Park, St Johnstone, Queen of the South, Falkirk, Stirling Albion, Alloa Athletic, Brechin City and Verdal IL.

== Career ==
=== Queen's Park ===
Born in Paisley and raised in Clarkston, East Renfrewshire, Weatherston began his career with Queen's Park in 2004 where he played in 78 league games, scoring 22 goals in three seasons. During his time at the club, he was voted into the Third Division Team of the Year in 2006–07.

=== St Johnstone ===
He joined St Johnstone in the summer of 2007 for one season, where he played in 27 league games without scoring a goal.

=== Queen of the South ===
Weatherston signed for Dumfries side Queen of the South on 27 August 2008. Weatherston made his debut with a substitute appearance in the 3–1 league defeat at Palmerston against Dundee on 30 August 2008. He scored his first goal for Queens in the following game in a 1–0 victory over Ross County.

In the top of table clash at Palmerston against Livingston on 4 October 2008, Weatherston scored his next two goals. The 6–1 victory saw Queens go top of the First Division for the first time in five years.

On 19 February 2011 Weatherston scored his first senior career hat trick in the 4–0 win away at Morton.

In his three seasons with the club, Weatherston played in 74 league games, scoring 17 goals.

=== Falkirk ===
Weatherston signed for Falkirk on 10 August 2011, signing a six-month deal until 3 January 2012. He made his Falkirk debut against Partick Thistle three days later, as the club won the match 2–1. He scored his first goal for Falkirk on 17 September 2011 in 2–1 win over Dundee. He made 33 appearances in total in season 2011/12, and in the Summer of 2012, signed a one-year extension to his deal.

Weatherston's 2012–13 campaign was to be blighted with injury however, not allowing him to get a consistent run in the team. He made 29 appearances, 9 of those coming from the bench. Weatherston was told in May 2013 he would not have his contract renewed by newly appointed manager Gary Holt, and left the club along with Darren Dods, Sean Higgins, Iain Flannigan and Dale Fulton.

=== Stirling Albion ===
On 8 August 2013, Weatherston signed for Scottish League Two side Stirling Albion on a one-year deal along with former Falkirk teammate Dale Fulton. He made his debut against Montrose coming on as a substitute in a 2–1 victory. He played a key role in helping Albion gain promotion through the League Two play-offs, teaming up with old Falkirk teammate Jordan White up front, forming a strong partnership. He finished the season having made 36 appearances in all competitions, scoring 9 goals.

=== Alloa Athletic ===
On 29 May 2014, Weatherston signed for Scottish Championship side Alloa Athletic, after leaving Stirling.

=== Verdal ===
On 12 September 2016, the last day of the transfer window, Verdal confirmed the signing of Weatherston, after attempts from the player to be contracted by Norwegian 1st Division side Levanger had failed.

== Career statistics ==
=== Club ===
Appearances and goals by club, season and competition
Club	Season	League			FA Cup		League Cup		Challenge Cup		Total	
Club	Season	Division	Apps	Goals	Apps	Goals	Apps	Goals	Apps	Goals	Apps	Goals
Queen's Park	2003-04	Scottish Third Division	3	0	0	0	0	0	0	0	3	0
Queen's Park	2004-05	Scottish Third Division	7	0	0	0	0	0	0	0	7	0
Queen's Park	2005-06	Scottish Third Division	33	6	2	2	2	1	1	0	38	9
Queen's Park	2006-07	Scottish Third Division	37	18	2	0	3	0	2	0	44	18
Queen's Park	Total		80	24	4	2	5	1	3	0	92	27
St Johnstone	2007-08	Scottish First Division	27	0	0	0	0	0	0	0	27	0
St Johnstone	2008-09	Scottish First Division	1	0	0	0	0	0	0	0	1	0
St Johnstone	Total		28	0	0	0	0	0	0	0	28	0
Queen of the South	2008-09	Scottish First Division	20	4	0	0	1	0	0	0	21	4
Queen of the South	2009-10	Scottish First Division	30	8	1	0	3	2	3	0	37	10
Queen of the South	2010-11	Scottish First Division	29	5	1	0	3	1	4	1	37	7
Queen of the South	Total		79	17	2	0	7	3	7	1	95	21
Falkirk	2011-12	Scottish First Division	27	4	1	0	3	0	3	0	34	4
Falkirk	2012-13	Scottish First Division	24	4	3	1	1	0	1	0	29	5
Falkirk	Total		51	8	4	1	4	0	4	0	63	9
Stirling Albion	2013-14	Scottish League Two	29	8	2	0	0	0	0	0	31	8
Alloa Athletic	2014-15	Scottish Championship	2	0	2	0	0	0	0	0	4	0
Brechin City	2015-16	Scottish League One	16	2	0	0	1	0	0	0	17	2
Career total			285	59	14	3	17	4	14	1	330	67

== Honours ==
Falkirk

- Scottish Challenge Cup: 2011–12

== Sporting Family ==
Weatherston is the cousin of professional golfer Martin Laird.
