= Kallum Higginbotham =

English footballer (born 1989)

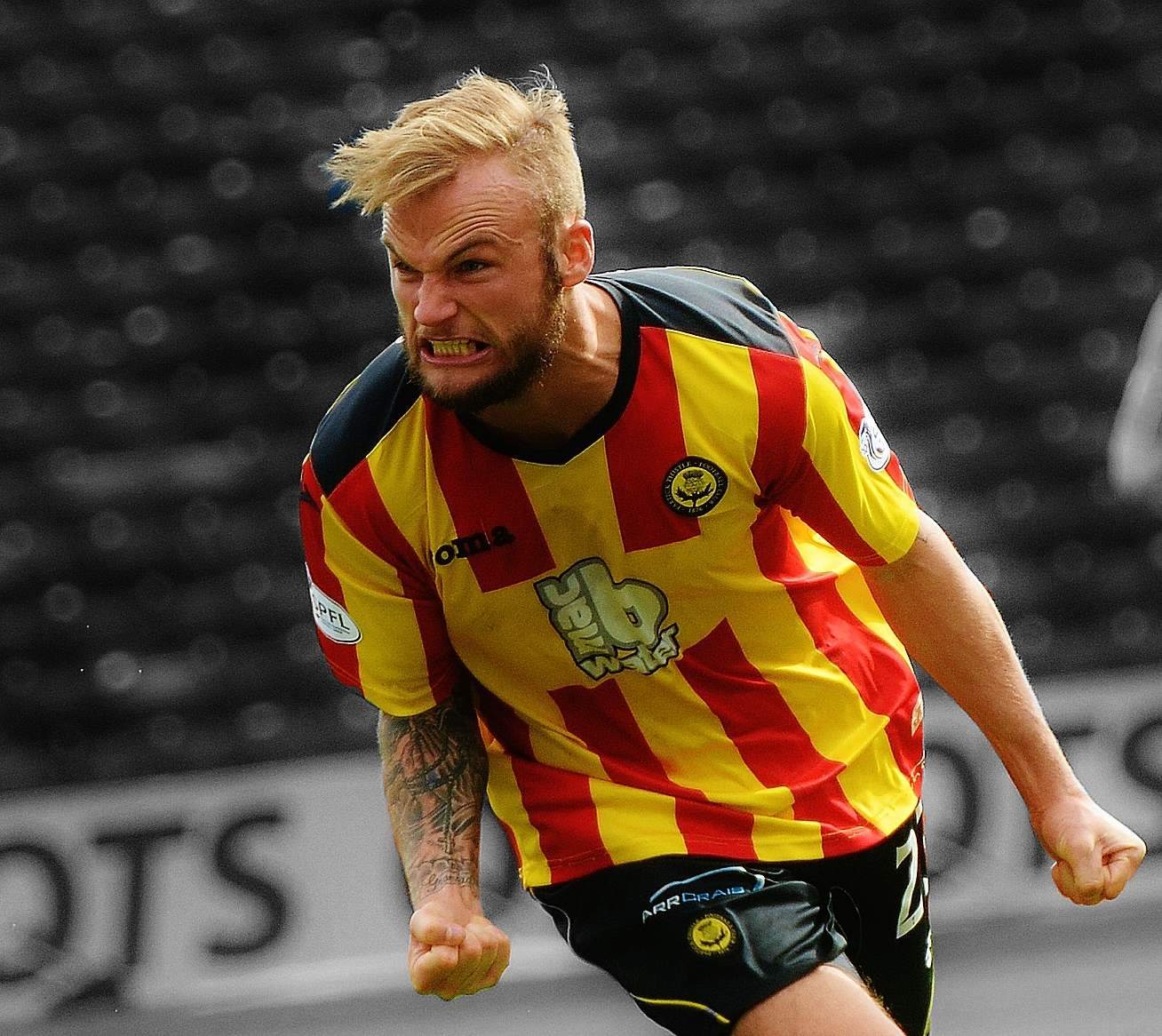
- Higginbotham with Partick Thistle in 2014

Personal information
- Full name: Kallum Michael Higginbotham
- Date of birth: 15 June 1989 (age 37)
- Place of birth: Salford, England
- Height: 5 ft 11 in (1.80 m)
- Positions: Winger; striker

Team information
- Current team: Kelty Hearts
- Number: 9

Senior career*
Years	Team	Apps	(Gls)
–2006	Salford City		
2006–2007	Oldham Athletic	0	(0)
2007–2010	Rochdale	72	(7)
2008	→ Accrington Stanley (loan)	5	(0)
2009	→ Accrington Stanley (loan)	7	(0)
2010–2012	Falkirk	50	(7)
2012–2013	Huddersfield Town	4	(0)
2012	→ Barnsley (loan)	5	(0)
2012	→ Carlisle United (loan)	10	(0)
2013	→ Motherwell (loan)	10	(1)
2013–2015	Partick Thistle	66	(10)
2015–2016	Kilmarnock	27	(5)
2016–2019	Dunfermline Athletic	86	(16)
2019–2020	Real Kashmir	15	(2)
2020–2023	Kelty Hearts	54	(17)
2023–2024	Tranent	31	(8)
2024	Bonnyrigg Rose	18	(1)
2025	East Fife	15	(0)
2025–2026	Bonnyrigg Rose	32	(8)
2026–	Kelty Hearts	10	(0)
- * Club domestic league appearances and goals as of 21:14, 19 October 2026 (UTC)

Kallum Michael Higginbotham (born 15 June 1989) is an English footballer who plays as a winger for Scottish League Two side Kelty Hearts.

Higginbotham started his football career as a youth player at Salford City and then in Oldham Athletic's reserve squad. Having failed to break into the first team at Boundary Park, Higginbotham joined League One side Rochdale in 2007. He was later loaned to Accrington Stanley, having fallen out of favour. He joined Scottish First Division side Falkirk in June 2010, where he enjoyed two successful seasons with the club. Higginbotham left Falkirk in 2012 and joined Huddersfield Town, where he spent the majority of his time on loan at Barnsley, Carlisle and Motherwell. Higginbotham failed to establish himself at Huddersfield and subsequently joined newly promoted Scottish Premiership side Partick Thistle in 2013. After spending a season with Kilmarnock, Higginbotham moved to newly promoted Scottish Championship side Dunfermline Athletic in 2016 where he spent three seasons. Higginbotham also had three seasons at Kelty Hearts until he left the club to join Tranent. After a year with Tranent he left the lowland league outfit to join Scottish league two side Bonnyrigg Rose Athletic for the forthcoming 2024-25 season. In the January transfer window he signed for Scottish league Two side East Fife until the end of 2024-25 season.

== Career ==
=== Rochdale ===
Born in Salford, Greater Manchester, Higginbotham started his career at Salford City before joining Oldham Athletic at 18 years of age. Despite a half-decent scoring record in the reserves at Oldham he never made it into the first team at Boundary Park. His most notable moment while at the Latics was his hat-trick in the Lancs Youth Cup final, against his later employers Rochdale.

Higginbotham was released by Oldham one year into his youth trainee contract, and joined Rochdale to complete the last year, hoping to persuade manager Keith Hill to offer him a professional contract. Higginbotham wore the number 18 shirt for the 2007–08 season. His debut came for Rochdale in a friendly against Rossendale United, in which he scored the winning goal.

During the 2007–08 season, Higginbotham became a regular in the first-team at Spotland, finding himself in favour over out-of-sorts winger Ben Muirhead. His first league goal came on 5 December when he scored against Accrington Stanley in a 2–1 win for Rochdale. The 2008–09 season saw Higginbotham displaced by the emergence of Will Buckley and he spent two spells on loan to Accrington Stanley, firstly moving on 16 October 2008, for one month and then returning for another two months on 23 January 2009. At the end of the season he was placed on the transfer list. In Rochdale's promotion season he scored the league's Goal of the Year with a beautiful volley from the halfway line at Accrington Stanley in a 4–2 victory.

=== Falkirk ===
In June 2010, he signed for Scottish First Division club Falkirk on a two-year deal. After a season where he did not find his best form, Higginbotham later formed a fruitful striking partnership with Moroccan striker Farid El Alagui. In January 2012, Higginbotham was awarded man of the match in the 2011–12 League Cup semi-final against Celtic, which turned out to be last game for the club.

=== Huddersfield Town ===
On 31 January 2012, just as the transfer window closed, Higginbotham headed back to England to join Football League One side Huddersfield Town on a two-and-a-half-year deal, despite interest from both Rangers and Celtic as well as Championship clubs Crystal Palace and Ipswich Town. He made his debut in the 1–1 draw against Milton Keynes Dons at the Galpharm Stadium on 4 February 2012, where he assisted Huddersfield's goal with a tantalising cross.

On 22 March, after being isolated by new Town boss Simon Grayson, Higginbotham went up a division to join Barnsley on loan for the remainder of the season. He was recalled on 26 April with Grayson saying he has a part to play in their current play-off campaign and the remainder of the season after getting form whilst on loan at Barnsley Higginbotham started in the League One play-off final as Huddersfield won promotion to the Championship beating Sheffield United 8–7 on penalties following a 0–0 draw.

==== Carlisle United loan ====
On 20 September 2012, Higginbotham joined Carlisle United on a 3-month loan deal. That loan was cancelled by the Cumbrian side on 7 December.

==== Motherwell loan ====
On 9 January 2013, after still not getting a chance to stake his claim at Huddersfield, Higginbotham returned to Scotland to join Scottish Premier League side Motherwell on loan for the season. His only goal whilst with the Well was an impressive scissor-kick in a 4–1 win over Hibernian.

=== Partick Thistle ===
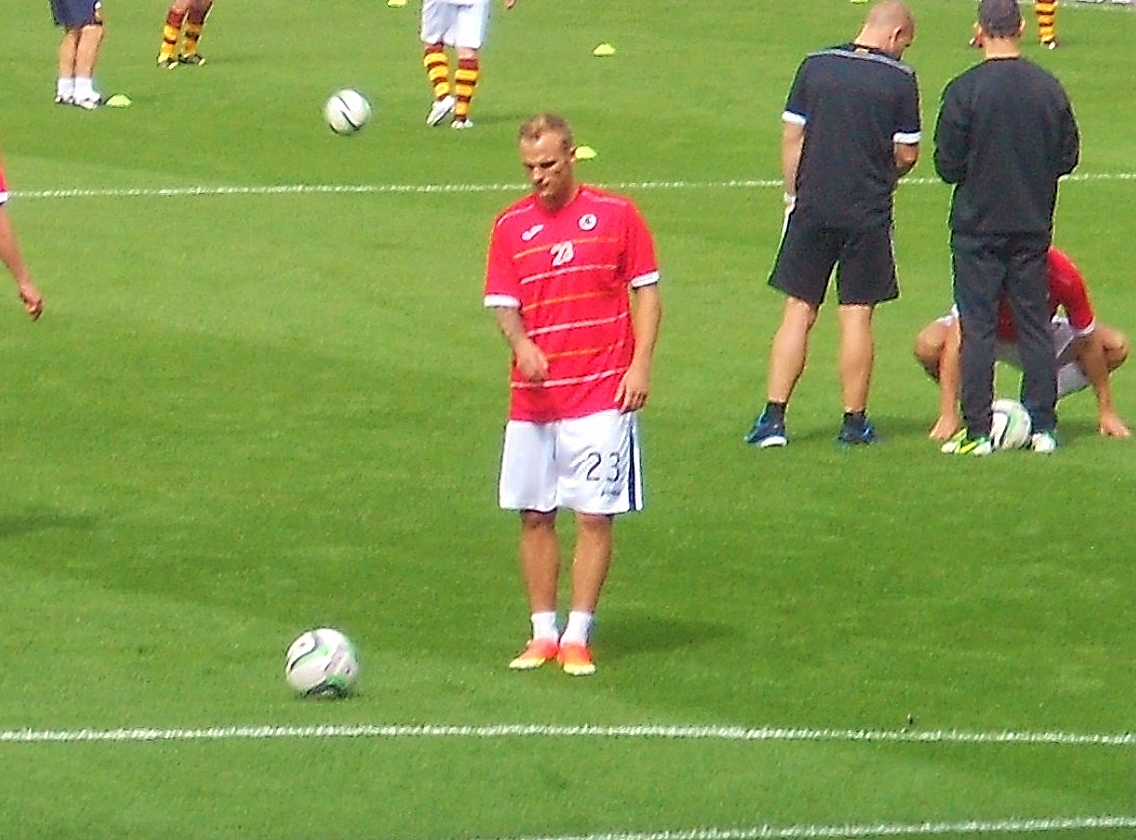
Higginbotham at Fir Park

After returning to Huddersfield Town, Higginbotham failed to establish himself in the first team, and was subsequently released from his contract. He signed for Scottish Premiership side Partick Thistle on a two-year deal on 8 August 2013. Two days later he made his Partick Thistle debut in a 3–1 victory over Ross County where he had two goals controversially disallowed for offside. He made his home debut for Thistle in a 1–1 draw against Hearts. Higginbotham scored his first goal for the Jags on 31 August 2013, in a 2–1 comeback win away to St Mirren. He scored his first home goal for the club with an overhead kick against Kilmarnock after 3 minutes, the game finished 1–1 after Killie scored a 90th-minute equalizer. On 15 February 2014, Higginbotham scored two goals against his former club Motherwell at Fir Park as Thistle lost 4–3 despite having led 3–2 with 4 minutes left to play. Higginbotham then scored a free kick in a 1–1 draw with Ross county. Higginbotham scored at the time his 6th goal of the season in a 3–1 home win against Hibernian sealing the win with a stoppage time goal to make it 3–1 thistle. Higginbotham then scored another free kick against killmarnock. On 7 May 2014, he scored the fourth goal as Partick Thistle won 4–2 away at Hearts, a result which secured their safety in the top flight.

In the 2014–15 season Higginbotham got his first goal in a 2–1 defeat at home to Hamilton Accies, scoring the opener in the 85th minute with a strike from 28 yards. Higginbotham scored his second goal of the season in a 3–1 home victory over Inverness Caledonian Thistle, who were at the time top of the table, with a 25-yard shot. On 7 March 2015, Higginbotham was red carded in a 1–0 defeat to Ross County.

=== Kilmarnock ===
On 25 June 2015, Higginbotham signed a two-year deal with Kilmarnock. Higginbotham scored his first Kilmarnock goal with a chipped penalty in a 2–2 draw with Celtic. Higginbotham scored a top corner strike in Kilmarnock's 4–1 league cup win over Berwick Higginbotham then scored his second league goal of the season scoring his second penalty in a 2–1 win over Dundee United. Higginbotham scored his third league goal of the season scoring a header in a 3–0 home win over St Johnstone Higginbotham was one of 7 players transfer listed by Kilmarnock after their play-off final win over Falkirk.

=== Dunfermline Athletic ===
After leaving Kilmarnock, Higginbotham signed a one-year contract with Scottish Championship side Dunfermline Athletic in July 2016. He made his first appearance for the side as a second-half substitute for Rhys McCabe against Arbroath in the Scottish League Cup, where he made an immediate impact by helping to create Michael Moffat's second goal of the match to leave his side as 3–0 winners. His first start for the Pars came in the same competition, against Fife rivals Cowdenbeath. Once again, Higginbotham helped to create a goal for his side, this time coming in the form of a free-kick which was headed in goal by defender Lee Ashcroft to put Dunfermline two-nil up. His first goal for the club came in his thirteenth appearance for Dunfermline, and saw him convert a penalty in the twenty-second minute against Hibernian, a match which the Pars eventually lost 3–1. Higginbotham was released in May 2019 after spending three seasons with the side.

=== Real Kashmir ===
Shortly after leaving Dunfermline, Higginbotham signed with I-League club Real Kashmir. Real Kashmir club manager David Robertson signed him as a winger for his side in the upcoming Hero I-League season 2019–20. He became the Kashmiri side's new foreigner in 2019 and the first English footballer in team history.

=== Kelty Hearts ===
Kelty Hearts announced the signing of Higginbotham on 12 July 2020.

=== Tranent ===
On 1 July 2023, Higginbotham joined Lowland League side Tranent.

=== East Fife ===
On 17 January 2025, Higginbotham joined Scottish League Two team East Fife on a short-term deal until the end of the season.

=== Bonnyrigg Rose ===
On 21 June 2025, Higginbotham rejoined former club Bonnyrigg Rose, who were now playing in the Lowland League, on a one-year deal.

=== Kelty Hearts ===
On 10 July 2026, Higginbotham returned to former club Kelty Hearts, now of Scottish League Two.

== Personal life ==
Higginbotham previously played youth football for Salford Lads' Club, and also worked as a scaffolder.

== Career statistics ==
As of 13 July 2020

Appearances and goals by club, season and competition
Club	Season	League			National cup		League cup		Other		Total	
Club	Season	Division	Apps	Goals	Apps	Goals	Apps	Goals	Apps	Goals	Apps	Goals
Rochdale	2007–08	League Two	36	3	1	0	0	0	1 (Note: Appearance in Football League Trophy)	0	38	3
Rochdale	2008–09	League Two	7	1	1	0	1	0	0	0	9	1
Rochdale	2009–10	League Two	29	3	2	0	1	0	0	0	32	3
Rochdale	Total		72	7	4	0	2	0	1	0	79	7
Accrington Stanley (loan)	2008–09	League Two	5	0	0	0	0	0	0	0	5	0
Accrington Stanley (loan)	2008–09	League Two	7	0	0	0	0	0	0	0	7	0
Falkirk	2010–11	Scottish First Division	30	2	2	0	2	0	1 (Note: Appearances in Scottish Challenge Cup)	0	35	2
Falkirk	2011–12	Scottish First Division	20	5	1	0	4	1	4	2	29	8
Falkirk	Total		50	7	3	0	6	1	5	2	64	10
Huddersfield Town	2011–12	League One	4	0	0	0	0	0	3 (Note: Appearances in League One play-offs)	0	7	0
Huddersfield Town	2012–13	Championship	0	0	0	0	0	0	0	0	0	0
Huddersfield Town	2013–14	Championship	0	0	0	0	0	0	0	0	0	0
Huddersfield Town	Total		4	0	0	0	0	0	3	0	7	0
Barnsley (loan)	2011–12	Championship	5	0	0	0	0	0	0	0	5	0
Carlisle United (loan)	2012–13	League One	10	0	0	0	1	0	0	0	11	0
Motherwell (loan)	2012–13	Scottish Premier League	10	1	0	0	0	0	0	0	10	1
Partick Thistle	2013–14	Scottish Premiership	36	8	1	0	2	0	0	0	39	8
Partick Thistle	2014–15	Scottish Premiership	30	2	2	0	3	0	0	0	35	2
Partick Thistle	Total		66	10	3	0	5	0	0	0	74	10
Kilmarnock	2015–16	Scottish Premiership	27	5	2	0	2	1	0	0	31	6
Dunfermline Athletic	2016–17	Scottish Championship	32	6	4	1	4	0	3	0	43	7
Dunfermline Athletic	2017–18	Scottish Championship	32	10	2	0	5	0	4 (Note: Appearances in Premiership play-offs)	0	43	10
Dunfermline Athletic	2018–19	Scottish Championship	22	0	1	0	3	1	2	0	28	1
Dunfermline Athletic	Total		86	16	7	1	12	1	9	0	114	18
Real Kashmir	2019–20	I-league	10	2	0	0	0	0	0	0	10	2
Career total			350	48	19	1	28	3	16	2	414	54

== Honours ==
Rochdale

- Football League Two third-place promotion: 2009–10

Huddersfield Town

- Football League One play-offs: 2012
