= Jay Fulton =

Scottish footballer

Personal information
- Full name: Jay Fulton
- Date of birth: 1 April 1994 (age 32)
- Place of birth: Bolton, England
- Height: 6 ft 1 in (1.85 m)
- Position: Defensive midfielder

Team information
- Current team: Swansea City
- Number: 4

Youth career
- Celtic
- 2006–2009: Heart of Midlothian
- 2009–2011: Falkirk

Senior career*
Years	Team	Apps	(Gls)
2011–2014	Falkirk	83	(5)
2014–	Swansea City	301	(14)
2015	→ Oldham Athletic (loan)	11	(0)
2018	→ Wigan Athletic (loan)	5	(1)

International career
2012	Scotland U18	2	(0)
2012	Scotland U19	1	(0)
2014–2015	Scotland U21	2	(0)
- * Club domestic league appearances and goals as of 20:16, 31 October 2026 (UTC)

Jay Fulton (born 1 April 1994) is a Scottish professional footballer who plays as a midfielder for EFL Championship club Swansea City. He previously played for Falkirk, and spent time with Oldham Athletic and Wigan Athletic on loan from Swansea. He represented Scotland at international youth levels up to under-21s.

== Club career ==
=== Falkirk ===
Fulton spent time with the youth systems of Celtic and Heart of Midlothian before finishing his development at Falkirk. He made his first team debut aged 17 on 12 April 2011 as a substitute in Falkirk's 2–1 away win over Partick Thistle in the Scottish First Division. He made one further appearance that season (a 2–0 home win over the same opponents).

=== Swansea ===
Fulton signed for Welsh side Swansea City on transfer deadline day of the 2014 January transfer window for an undisclosed fee, on a two-and-a-half-year deal. On 26 April 2014, he made his Premier League debut as an 83rd-minute substitute in Swansea's 4–1 win over Aston Villa. After an impressive end to the season Fulton was rewarded with a new four-year contract at Swansea, keeping him at the club until June 2018. On 18 September 2015, he joined League One side Oldham Athletic on a three-month emergency loan deal. He scored his first goal for Swansea in a 3–1 EFL Cup win against Peterborough United on 23 August 2016. On 25 January 2018, Fulton joined Wigan Athletic on loan for the remainder of the 2017–18 season. On 18 January 2021, he signed a new deal with Swansea, keeping him at the club until June 2024.

On the 29 May 2021, Fulton was sent off in the 65th minute at Wembley during Swansea's eventual loss to Brentford in the 2020–21 EFL Championship play-off final. Following Wayne Routledge's retirement, Fulton became the longest-serving Swansea player, eventually celebrating 10 years at the club in 2024.

== Personal life ==
Fulton is a third-generation footballer in his family. His grandfather Norrie Fulton played for Pollok and scored the winning goal in the 1981 Scottish Junior Cup Final. His father is former Falkirk, Celtic and Heart of Midlothian player Steve Fulton; he was born during his father's short spell in England with Bolton Wanderers. His brothers Dale and Tyler Fulton both played for Falkirk.

== Career statistics ==
As of match played 1 September 2026

Appearances and goals by club, season and competition
Club	Season	League			National cup (Note: Includes Scottish Cup, FA Cup)		League cup (Note: Includes Scottish League Cup, EFL Cup)		Other		Total	
Club	Season	Division	Apps	Goals	Apps	Goals	Apps	Goals	Apps	Goals	Apps	Goals
Falkirk	2010–11	Scottish First Division	2	0	0	0	0	0	0	0	2	0
Falkirk	2011–12	Scottish First Division	32	1	1	0	5	2	4 (Note: Appearance(s) in Scottish Challenge Cup)	0	42	3
Falkirk	2012–13	Scottish First Division	28	2	3	1	2	0	2	0	35	3
Falkirk	2013–14	Scottish Championship	21	2	1	0	3	1	3	0	28	3
Falkirk	Total		83	5	5	1	10	3	9	0	107	9
Swansea City	2013–14	Premier League	2	0	0	0	0	0	—		2	0
Swansea City	2014–15	Premier League	2	0	1	0	2	0	—		5	0
Swansea City	2015–16	Premier League	2	0	0	0	0	0	—		2	0
Swansea City	2016–17	Premier League	11	0	0	0	2	1	—		13	1
Swansea City	2017–18	Premier League	2	0	0	0	1	0	—		3	0
Swansea City	2018–19	Championship	33	2	4	1	0	0	—		37	3
Swansea City	2019–20	Championship	36	3	1	0	0	0	2 (Note: Appearances in Championship play-offs)	0	39	3
Swansea City	2020–21	Championship	40	3	3	0	1	0	3	0	47	3
Swansea City	2021–22	Championship	18	0	1	0	2	0	—		21	0
Swansea City	2022–23	Championship	38	3	2	0	1	1	—		41	4
Swansea City	2023–24	Championship	43	1	1	0	2	0			46	1
Swansea City	2024–25	Championship	31	1	0	0	2	0	—		33	1
Swansea City	2025–26	Championship	30	1	1	0	2	0	—		33	1
Swansea City	2026–27	Championship	4	0	1	0	0	0	—		5	0
Swansea City	Total		292	14	15	1	15	2	5	0	327	17
Swansea City U23	2016–17	—			—		—		3 (Note: Appearance(s) in EFL Trophy)	0	3	0
Swansea City U23	2017–18	—			—		—		1	0	1	0
Oldham Athletic (loan)	2015–16	League One	11	0	0	0	—		—		11	0
Wigan Athletic (loan)	2017–18	League One	5	1	1	0	—		—		6	1
Career total			391	20	21	2	25	5	18	0	455	27

== Honours ==
Swansea City U23

- Premier League Cup: 2016–17

Falkirk

- Scottish Challenge Cup: 2011–12
