= Dale Fulton =

Scottish footballer (born 1992)

Personal information
- Full name: Dale Fulton
- Date of birth: 11 September 1992 (age 34)
- Place of birth: Greenock, Scotland
- Height: 6 ft 0 in (1.83 m)
- Position: Midfielder

Senior career*
Years	Team	Apps	(Gls)
2011–2013	Falkirk	14	(0)
2012	→ Clyde (loan)	2	(0)
2013–2015	Stirling Albion	35	(5)
- * Club domestic league appearances and goals as of 01:52, 26 January 2015 (UTC)

Dale Fulton (born 11 September 1992) is a Scottish professional footballer who previously played for Falkirk, Clyde and Stirling Albion

== Career ==
=== Falkirk ===
Fulton made his first team debut on 30 July 2011 as a substitute in Falkirk's 4 -2 win over Albion Rovers in the Scottish League Cup. His first league start came on 6 August 2011, against Raith Rovers at Starks Park. He went on to make 12 more appearances for Falkirk in season 2011–12. During the 2012–13 season, he made 11 appearances in total, with his last outing in a Falkirk shirt coming at the same venue he made his league debut for the club, playing in a 0–0 draw against Raith Rovers at Stark's Park.

=== Clyde (loan) ===
On 13 January 2012, Fulton joined Scottish Third Division side Clyde on a month's loan deal. He made his league debut the following day, starting against Montrose.

=== Stirling Albion ===
On 8 August 2013, Fulton joined Scottish League Two side Stirling Albion along with former Falkirk teammate David Weatherston. He scored just 6 minutes into his debut on 10 August 2013, in a 2–1 victory over Montrose.

On 23 January 2015, Fulton left Stirling Albion.

== Personal life ==
Fulton's father is former Celtic, Falkirk and Hearts player Steve Fulton. His brother Jay Fulton plays for Swansea City.

== Career statistics ==
As of 26 January 2015

Club	Season	League		Scottish Cup		League Cup		Other		Total	
Club	Season	App	Goals	App	Goals	App	Goals	App	Goals	App	Goals
Falkirk	2011–12	6	0	1	0	3	0	3	0	13	0
Falkirk	2012–13	8	0	1	0	2	0	0	0	11	0
Falkirk	Total	14	0	2	0	5	0	3	0	24	0
Clyde (loan)	2011–12	2	0	0	0	0	0	0	0	2	0
Stirling Albion	2013–14	24	4	3	0	0	0	1	0	28	4
Stirling Albion	2014–15	11	1	3	0	1	0	2	0	17	1
Stirling Albion	Total	35	5	6	0	1	0	3	0	45	5
Career total		51	5	8	0	6	0	6	0	71	5
