= Brian Winter =

Scottish football referee

- Full name: Brian Winter
- Born: 21 January 1968 (age 58); Scotland

Domestic
Years	League	Role
1993–2012	Scottish Football Association	Referee
1998–2012	SFL / SPL	Referee

Brian Winter (born 21 January 1968) is a Scottish former football referee.

In September 2010 he had to be talked out of quitting as a referee after he failed to send off Steven Anderson despite showing two yellow cards to the player in the space of 12 minutes.

He retired in 2012 due to injury, a short time after taking charge of one of his highest-profile appointments, the 2012 Scottish Challenge Cup Final. He was appointed as a 'referee observer' by the Scottish Football Association a few months following his retirement. In 2017, he was given responsibility for overseeing officials in the Lanarkshire and Stirlingshire regions.

His son Andy Winter is a footballer who began his career with Hamilton Academical.
