= Mark Millar (footballer) =

Scottish footballer

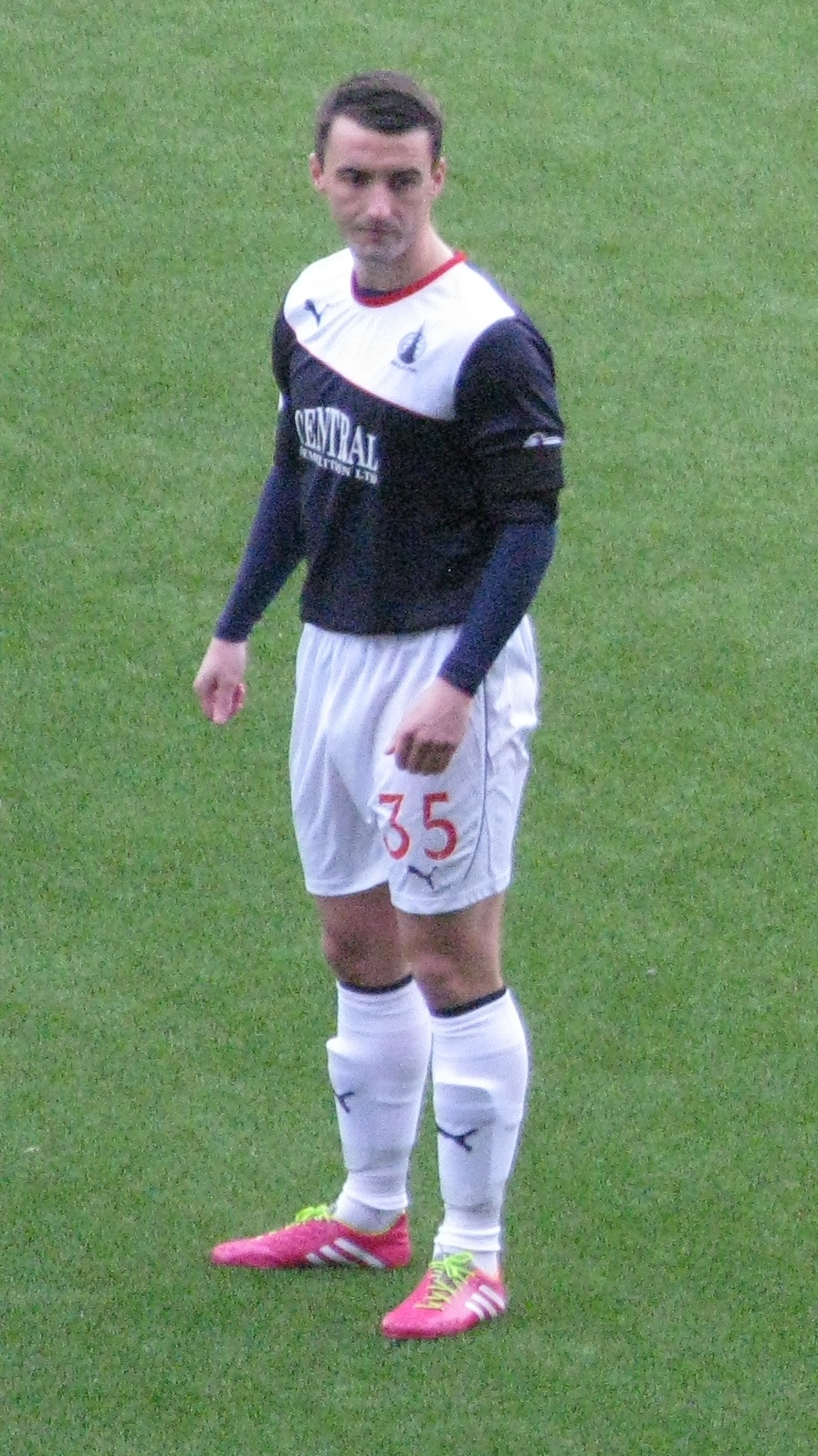
- Millar playing for Falkirk in 2013

Personal information
- Date of birth: 23 February 1988 (age 38)
- Place of birth: Greenock, Scotland
- Positions: Midfielder; defender

Youth career
- 2008–2009: Celtic

Senior career*
| Years | Team | Apps | (Gls) |
| 2009–2010 | Celtic | 0 | (0) |
| 2009–2010 | → Újpest (loan) | 13 | (1) |
| 2010–2012 | Falkirk | 63 | (11) |
| 2012–2014 | Dundee United | 18 | (0) |
| 2013–2014 | → Falkirk (loan) | 25 | (6) |
| 2014–2015 | Peterhead | 10 | (0) |
| 2015–2017 | Queen of the South | 58 | (3) |
| 2017 | Livingston | 13 | (0) |
| 2017–2018 | Forfar Athletic | 27 | (6) |
| 2018–2019 | Largs Thistle | 34 | (12) |
| 2019–2020 | East Stirlingshire | 14 | (5) |
| 2020–2022 | St Cadoc's | ? | (?) |
| 2022–2023 | Kilwinning Rangers | 19 | (2) |

International career
| 2007 | Scotland U19 | 3 | (0) |
| 2008 | Scotland U21 | 1 | (0) |
- * Club domestic league appearances and goals

Mark Millar (born 23 February 1988) is a Scottish footballer who played as a central defender and central midfielder.

Millar started his career with Scottish Premier League club Celtic, spending a six-month spell on loan at Újpest in Hungary. Millar then moved to Scottish First Division club Falkirk. In June 2012 Millar signed a three-year deal with Dundee United. Millar returned to Falkirk on loan for the majority of the 2013–14 season before being released from his contract at Tannadice in May 2014. Millar has since had spells with Peterhead and Queen of the South, before moving to the West Lothian club, Livingston.

After leaving Forfar in 2018, he dropped down the leagues to play for Largs Thistle, East Stirlingshire and St Cadoc's.

Millar has been capped at both under-19 and under-21 level for Scotland.

== Career ==
Millar started his career with Celtic. In 2009, Millar moved on a six-month loan to Hungarian Nemzeti Bajnokság I club Újpest.

Millar signed for First Division side Falkirk in June 2010, he signed on a two-year contract and Falkirk said that two SPL clubs were interested in him. On 21 September 2011, he scored a 90th minute freekick in the League Cup to give Falkirk a 3–2 win over Rangers. The 2011–12 season was very successful for Millar as he was one of Falkirk's best players. With his contract expiring at the end of the season he attracted interest from several clubs, including Premier League team Swansea City. On deadline day, Millar was subjected of a bid from EFL Championship side Blackpool, an offer rejected by the Bairns. On 1 April 2012, he played for Falkirk in their 1–0 win over Hamilton in the 2012 Scottish Challenge Cup final.

Millar agreed to sign for Scottish Premier League club Dundee United for the 2012–13 season. Manager Peter Houston said that he thought United had signed the two best players in the First Division in Millar and Michael Gardyne of Ross County. He also said that he thought Millar was a different type of player to what United already had and that he would become a fans' favourite due to his style of play.

After only making one appearance for United in the opening quarter of the 2013–14 season, on 31 October 2013, Millar returned to former club Falkirk on a short-term loan deal until January 2014. He scored his first goals since his return to the Falkirk Stadium on 23 November 2013, with a brace in a 4–0 win over Cowdenbeath. On 6 January 2014, the deal was extended until the end of the season. Millar played a pivotal role in helping The Bairns reach the play-offs, putting in many fantastic performances in the centre of the park. He was the scorer of a last minute penalty against Queen of the South on 23 February 2014, that put Falkirk clear in third place. His last appearance in his second spell at Falkirk came in a 1–0 (2–1 on aggregate) defeat to Hamilton in the Scottish Premiership Play-Off Semi-Final 2nd leg.

After making 30 appearances in all competitions and scoring 6 goals, Millar returned to his parent club Dundee United. On 4 June 2014, Millar was released from his contract by Dundee United. On 16 August 2014, Millar signed for Peterhead on a short-term contract until January 2015. He made his debut on the same day in a 2–0 win against Airdrieonians.

Millar signed for Dumfries club Queen of the South on 8 January 2015. Millar's first Queens goal was scored on 18 April 2015 against Alloa Athletic at Recreation Park in a league match which had given Queens a 2–1 lead. Millar left Palmerston Park on 6 January 2017, signing for Scottish League One side Livingston on the same day. Millar signed for Forfar Athletic in July 2017. After a season with the club he moved into Junior football, signing for Largs Thistle. In June 2019, East Stirlingshire agreed a fee with Largs for the transfer of Millar.

Millar signed with Kilwinning Rangers in 2022, and was released one season at the Buffs, along with his namesake Chris Millar and five others.

=== International career ===
Millar played three times in friendlies for Scotland under-19s. His debut came on 23 March 2007 against Netherlands. He played twice the following month against Norway and Austria. He has also played once for Scotland under-21s. His debut came on 18 November 2008 in a friendly match against Northern Ireland in a match played at Hamilton.

=== Style of play ===
Millar is a central midfielder. Although he is small he is an aggressive tackler. During his time in Hungary he noted how the players there were skilful but didn't like being closed down and he used this to his advantage by putting in many tough tackles. Millar is also a good player technically and has been described as a "playmaker".

== Career statistics ==
As of match played 14 October 2017

Appearances and goals by club, season and competition
| Club | Season | League | | | National Cup | | League Cup | | Other | | Total | |
| Club | Season | Division | Apps | Goals | Apps | Goals | Apps | Goals | Apps | Goals | Apps | Goals |
|---|---|---|---|---|---|---|---|---|---|---|---|---|
| Celtic | 2009–10 | Scottish Premier League | 0 | 0 | 0 | 0 | 0 | 0 | 0 | 0 | 0 | 0 |
| Újpest (loan) | 2009–10 | Nemzeti Bajnokság I | 13 | 1 | 1 | 0 | 0 | 0 | 0 | 0 | 14 | 1 |
| Falkirk | 2010–11 | First Division | 30 | 5 | 2 | 1 | 3 | 0 | 1 (Note: Appearances in the Scottish Challenge Cup) | 0 | 36 | 6 |
| Falkirk | 2011–12 | First Division | 33 | 6 | 2 | 0 | 4 | 1 | 5 | 2 | 44 | 9 |
| Falkirk | Total | | 63 | 11 | 4 | 1 | 7 | 1 | 6 | 2 | 80 | 15 |
| Dundee United | 2012–13 | Scottish Premier League | 18 | 0 | 1 | 0 | 1 | 0 | 0 | 0 | 20 | 0 |
| Dundee United | 2013–14 | Scottish Premiership | 0 | 0 | 0 | 0 | 1 | 0 | 0 | 0 | 1 | 0 |
| Dundee United | Total | | 18 | 0 | 0 | 0 | 2 | 0 | 0 | 0 | 21 | 0 |
| Falkirk (loan) | 2013–14 | Scottish Championship | 24 | 6 | 1 | 0 | 0 | 0 | 4 (Note: Appearances in the Premiership play-offs) | 0 | 29 | 6 |
| Peterhead | 2014–15 | Scottish League One | 10 | 0 | 1 | 0 | 0 | 0 | 1 | 0 | 12 | 0 |
| Queen of the South | 2014–15 | Scottish Championship | 13 | 1 | 0 | 0 | 0 | 0 | 2 (Note: Appearances in the Premiership play-offs) | 0 | 15 | 1 |
| Queen of the South | 2015–16 | Scottish Championship | 27 | 1 | 1 | 0 | 2 | 0 | 2 | 0 | 32 | 1 |
| Queen of the South | 2016–17 | Scottish Championship | 18 | 1 | 1 | 0 | 4 | 0 | 3 | 0 | 26 | 1 |
| Queen of the South | Total | | 58 | 3 | 2 | 0 | 6 | 0 | 7 | 0 | 73 | 3 |
| Livingston | 2016–17 | Scottish League One | 13 | 0 | 0 | 0 | 0 | 0 | 0 | 0 | 13 | 0 |
| Forfar Athletic | 2017–18 | Scottish League One | 27 | 6 | 0 | 0 | 4 | 1 | 1 | 1 | 32 | 6 |
| Career total | | | 226 | 27 | 10 | 1 | 19 | 2 | 19 | 3 | 274 | 31 |

== Honours ==
Falkirk

- Scottish Challenge Cup: 2011–12

Livingston

- Scottish League One: 2016–17
