= Darren Dods =

Scottish football player and coach (b.1975)

Personal information
- Date of birth: 7 June 1975 (age 51)
- Place of birth: Edinburgh, Scotland
- Position: Defender

Team information
- Current team: Cumbernauld Colts (assistant manager)

Senior career*
Years	Team	Apps	(Gls)
1992–1998	Hibernian	64	(1)
1998–2004	St Johnstone	168	(11)
2004–2007	Inverness Caledonian Thistle	100	(7)
2007–2011	Dundee United	82	(3)
2011–2013	Falkirk	61	(7)
2013–2015	Forfar Athletic	68	(5)
2015–2018	Brechin City	22	(2)
Total		565	(36)

International career
1995–1996	Scotland U21	5	(0)
2007	Scotland B	1	(0)

Managerial career
- 2015–2018: Brechin City
- * Club domestic league appearances and goals

Darren Dods (born 7 June 1975) is a Scottish football player and coach. Dods played as a central defender for Hibernian, St Johnstone, Inverness Caledonian Thistle, Dundee United, Falkirk, Forfar Athletic and Brechin City. He also represented Scotland at the under-21 and B international levels.

== Playing career ==
Edinburgh-born Dods attended Broughton High School. He began his professional career with hometown club Hibernian in 1992, making over seventy first team appearances in a six-year spell. In 1998, Dods moved to St Johnstone where his performances earned him a four-year contract extension in December 2000.

=== Inverness CT ===
When his contract expired in the Summer of 2004, he signed a contract at Inverness Caledonian Thistle and won the Caley Thistle fans' Player of the Year award in his first season.

In March 2006, shortly after Craig Brewster left Inverness to become Dundee United manager, Dods was rumoured to be a target for the Tayside club, although he still had over a year left on his contract. In June, it was reported that Dods had failed to agree a new contract, with Brewster – who had failed in a bid to sign Inverness players Ian Black and David Proctor – still heavily linked with the player. At the start of the 2006–07 season, Dods had a transfer request rejected by Inverness manager Charlie Christie with Inverness subsequently rejecting bids from United of £10,000 and then £35,000 for the player.

=== Dundee United ===
On 13 January 2007, it was announced Dods had signed a pre-contract agreement to join Dundee United in June 2007, despite Craig Brewster having left the United manager position three months earlier. New manager Craig Levein said he was "pleased" regarding Dods' two-year deal. On 22 June 2007, Dods formally joined the club, signing a two-year contract with Dundee United. In Dods' ninth game in October 2007, he scored his first goal for the club, heading the only goal in a 1–0 home win over Motherwell.

In November 2007, Dods won a cap for the Scotland B team.

=== Falkirk ===
On 13 June 2011, Dods signed for Falkirk. He scored his first goal against Brechin City in a Challenge Cup tie on 23 July 2011. Dods scored the goal in April 2012 to win Falkirk their 4th Scottish Challenge Cup, scoring a header in the 2nd minute in a 1–0 victory over Hamilton at Livingston's Almondvale Stadium. Dods signed a one-year contract extension to stay at Falkirk for the 2012/13 season. He missed a number of games at the start of the season due to a recurring injury, but by mid-September had settled back into his normal centre back role. Dods made 33 appearances in season 2012/13, scoring 5 goals, before leaving in the Summer of 2013. Despite being 37 and having begun his coaching badges, Dods said he still had an interest in the playing side of the game.

=== Forfar Athletic ===
On 7 July 2013, it was confirmed that Dods had signed for Forfar Athletic.

== Managerial career ==
=== Brechin City ===
In June 2015, following the departure of Ray McKinnon to Raith Rovers, Dods was appointed as player/manager of Brechin City in his first managerial role. Dods' first season with the club saw the club remain rooted to the bottom of League One for the majority of the 2015–16 season, winning just 4 of their first twenty-six matches. However, a late burst of form saw the club win 8 of the final ten games, pushing the side clear of the relegation and play-off positions to finish the season in seventh. Dods' second season was in stark contrast to the first, with Brechin remaining in the top four for most of the season 2016–17. Finishing the season in fourth, the club then went on to win promotion to the Scottish Championship for the first time in 11 years, defeating Raith Rovers and Alloa Athletic in the Championship play-offs.

They were relegated straight back to League One as early as March with only four points on the board following defeat by Morton on 24 March 2018. The club finished the season without winning a league match, the first club to do so in 126 years. Dods ended his playing career at the end of the 2017–18 season to focus solely on management. He was sacked by Brechin in October 2018.

== Career statistics ==
=== Player ===
As of match played 4 November 2017

Appearances and goals by club, season and competition
Club	Season	League			Scottish Cup		League Cup		Other		Total	
Club	Season	Division	Apps	Goals	Apps	Goals	Apps	Goals	Apps	Goals	Apps	Goals
Hibernian	1996–97	Premier Division	18	0	1	0	1	0	—		20	0
Hibernian	1997–98	Premier Division	29	1	1	0	2	0	—		32	1
Hibernian	Total		64	1	2	0	5	0	0	0	71	1
St Johnstone	1998–99	Premier League	34	2	4	1	5	0	—		43	3
St Johnstone	1999–2000	Premier League	22	2	1	0	0	0	2 (Note: Appearances in the UEFA Cup)	0	25	2
St Johnstone	2000–01	Premier League	30	1	2	0	1	0	—		33	1
St Johnstone	2001–02	Premier League	32	2	1	0	2	1	—		35	3
St Johnstone	2002–03	First Division	23	3	2	0	1	0	2 (Note: Appearances in the Scottish Challenge Cup)	0	28	3
St Johnstone	2003–04	First Division	26	1	0	0	4	2	2	0	32	3
St Johnstone	Total		167	11	10	1	13	3	6	0	196	15
Inverness Caledonian Thistle	2004–05	Premier League	28	1	2	0	0	0	—		30	1
Inverness Caledonian Thistle	2005–06	Premier League	37	2	4	0	2	0	—		43	2
Inverness Caledonian Thistle	2006–07	Premier League	35	4	3	0	1	0	—		39	4
Inverness Caledonian Thistle	Total		100	7	9	0	3	0	0	0	112	7
Dundee United	2007–08	Premier League	33	1	3	0	4	1	—		40	2
Dundee United	2008–09	Premier League	19	1	1	1	3	0	—		23	2
Dundee United	2009–10	Premier League	27	1	4	0	2	0	—		33	1
Dundee United	2010–11	Premier League	3	0	0	0	1	0	—		4	0
Dundee United	Total		82	3	8	1	10	1	0	0	100	5
Falkirk	2011–12	First Division	34	5	2	1	5	0	3	2	44	8
Falkirk	2012–13	First Division	27	2	4	0	1	0	1	0	33	2
Falkirk	Total		61	7	6	1	6	0	4	2	77	10
Forfar Athletic	2013–14	League One	33	2	4	0	1	0	0	0	38	2
Forfar Athletic	2014–15	League One	35	3	1	0	1	0	4 (Note: Appearances in the Championship play-offs)	0	41	3
Forfar Athletic	Total		68	5	5	0	2	0	4	0	79	5
Brechin City	2015–16	League One	21	2	1	0	0	0	1	0	23	2
Brechin City	2016–17	League One	1	0	0	0	0	0	0	0	1	0
Brechin City	2017–18	Championship	0	0	0	0	0	0	0	0	0	0
Brechin City	Total		22	2	1	0	0	0	1	0	24	2
Career total			542	34	40	3	39	4	14	2	635	43

=== Managerial record ===
As of match played 27 October 2018

Team	From	To	Record				
Team	From	To	G	W	D	L	Win %
Brechin City	10 June 2015	30 October 2018	143	35	23	85	24.48

== Honours and achievements ==
=== Player ===
Dundee United

- Scottish Cup: 2009–10

Falkirk

- Scottish Challenge Cup: 2011–12

=== Manager ===
Brechin City

- Scottish Championship play-offs: 2016–17

== See also ==
- List of footballers in Scotland by number of league appearances (500+)
