= Farid El Alagui =

French footballer (born 1985)

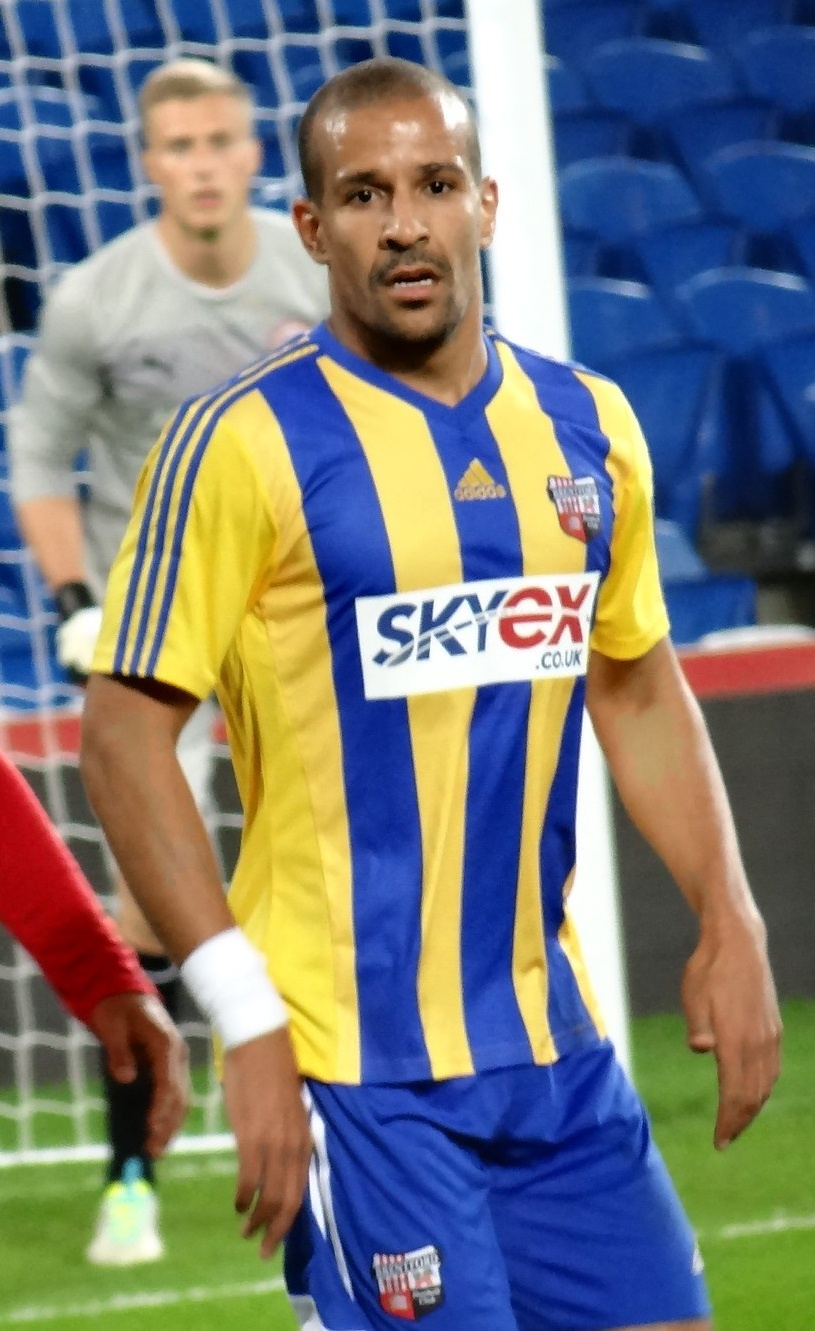
- El Alagui playing for Brentford's development team in 2013

Personal information
- Date of birth: 28 August 1985 (age 41)
- Place of birth: Bordeaux, France
- Height: 1.85 m (6 ft 1 in)
- Position: Forward

Senior career*
Years	Team	Apps	(Gls)
2005–2006	Marmande Foot	22	(10)
2006–2009	Bergerac Foot	54	(37)
2009–2010	Wydad	10	(3)
2010–2011	Romorantin	27	(14)
2011–2012	Falkirk	33	(18)
2012–2014	Brentford	23	(4)
2014	→ Dundee United (loan)	13	(3)
2014–2016	Hibernian	15	(5)
2016–2017	Dunfermline Athletic	13	(2)
2017	Ayr United	11	(3)
2017–2018	Edinburgh City	22	(4)
2018–2019	FC Marmande 47		
- * Club domestic league appearances and goals

Farid El Alagui (born 28 August 1985) is a Franco-Moroccan former professional footballer who played as a forward. He began his career in the lower leagues in France and made his breakthrough as a professional player at Scottish First Division club Falkirk, where he scored 27 goals in 43 appearances in his only season with the club.

== Club career ==
=== Early career ===
Born in Bordeaux, France, El Alagui began playing football when he was six or seven years old. El Alagui started out as a goalkeeper at 14 years old before moving to a defensive midfield position, as he wanted to play outfield. When El Alagui was 19, he tried out playing as a striker. Although El Alagui tried out playing as a striker, his manager was impressed with him and wanted to see him more in the position.

El Alagui began his career in amateur leagues in his native France, plying his trade at FC Marmande 47 and Bergerac Foot. He later revealed that: "No, I didn’t play professionally in France. I did have contact with Créteil and Gazélec Ajaccio at the time, but I didn’t pursue it. I wanted to play in countries where the passion and fervor for football were greater." This resulted in him moving to Moroccan top flight club Wydad Casablanca in 2009, winning the 2009–10 league championship in his first and only season with the club. In 2010, he returned to France and signed for CFA club SO Romorantin.

=== Falkirk ===
On 22 July 2011, El Alagui joined Scottish First Division club Falkirk on a one-year contracts. It came after when he went on trial with the club and impressed with the management, including Steven Pressley, leading him to a contract.

He made his first-team debut on 23 July 2011 in the club's 2–1 win over Brechin City in the Scottish Challenge Cup El Alagui scored his first goal for Falkirk in a 4–2 away win against Dundee, Albion Rovers on 30 July. He scored against Partick Thistle, Ayr United, Stenhousemuir and Ross County on 9 August 2011, 13 August 2011, 20 August 2011, 24 August 2011 and 27 August 2011 respectively. El Alagui scored on 17 September 2011 and 21 September 2011 against Dundee and a 3–2 victory against SPL club Rangers in the Scottish League Cup respectively. For his performance, he was named September’s Player of the Month.

El Alagui scored on 1 October 2011 and 9 October 2011 against Hamilton Academical and Annan Athletic (twice) respectively. He, once again, scored on 22 October 2011 and 25 October 2011 against Partick Thistle and Dundee United (a win that saw Falkirk advanced to the next round of the Scottish League Cup) respectively. His perfect start to the 2011–12 season in fine goalscoring form for his new club, scoring 15 goals in 17 appearances up until 25 October 2011. El Alagui later scored four more goals by the end of the year on 5 November 2011, 3 December 2011 and 17 December 2011 against Livingston, Greenock Morton and Queen of the South respectively. For his performances, he was December’s Player of the Month.

In the January transfer window, El Alagui was linked with several clubs in England, with the likes of Crawley Town, making a bid for him twice, only to be rejected by Steven Pressley, describing the bid as 'derisory'. Amid to his future at Falkirk, he scored on 2 January 2012 and 7 January 2012 against Livingston and East Fife respectively. On 21 January 2012, El Alagui scored his 23rd goal of the season, in a 2–2 draw against Raith Rovers. Ultimately, he stayed at the club.

El Alagui scored on 21 February 2012 and 25 February 2012 against Dundee and Queen of the South respectively. In a match against Ross County on 17 March 2012, however, he received a red card for a second bookable offence, in a 2–1 loss. After serving a one match suspension, El Alagui scored on his return and set up one of the goals, in a 5–2 loss against Livingston on 24 March 2012. On 1 April 2012, he furthered his reputation with the Falkirk fans, after winning the Scottish Challenge Cup against Hamilton Academical, he jumped into the crowd to celebrate with the support. A week later on 10 April 2012, El Alagui played against Hamilton Academical when he scored and set up one of the goals, in a 3–0 win. Two weeks later on 21 April 2012, El Alagui scored his 27th goal of the season and set up one of the goals, in a 3–2 loss against Raith Rovers. On the last game of the season, he scored his 28th goal of the season and set up one of the goals, in a 3–2 win against Ayr United. At the end of the 2011–12 season, El Alagui made 43 appearances and scored 27 goals during his only season with the club and departed in July 2012.

For his performances, El Alagui was the second highest top scorer in Scottish football in 2011–12, with Gary Hooper scoring one more goal. Due to his impressive season, he became a cult hero amongst the Falkirk supporters. El Alagui, along with teammate Michael McGovern, were nominated for PFA First Division Player of the Year, an award which El Alagui subsequently won. He was also named in the PFA First Division Team of the Year.

=== Brentford ===
League One club Brentford signed El Alagui on 3 July 2012 on a two-year deal, beating off interest from St Johnstone, Kilmarnock, several Championship clubs and clubs abroad. After joining the Bees, El Alagui said he turned down offers from two SPL clubs because manager Uwe Rösler persuaded him to join Brentford. Soon after, El Alagui was given a number ten shirt.

He made his debut for the club, coming on as a 63rd-minute substitute for Sam Saunders, in a 0–0 draw against Bury in the opening game of the season. On 24 August 2012, El Alagui scored his first two Brentford goals in a 5–1 win over Crewe Alexandra. After the match, strike partner Clayton Donaldson had supported El Alagui to become the new Gary Alexander. He was also named Football League’s Team of the Week for his performance. Two weeks later on 8 September 2012, El Alagui scored a winning goal in a 1–0 win over Colchester United. After the match, he was named Football League’s Team of the Week for his performance. During a match against Crawley Town on 6 October 2012, however, El Alagui came on as 79th-minute substitute but he soon suffered a serious knee injury, after colliding with Paul Jones, leading him to leave the pitch with 10 men for the rest of the game, as the club won 2–1. After the match, he spent much of the 2012–13 season on the sidelines. By March, El Alagui made his return to full training after recovering from a knee injury. On 18 March 2013, he made his return from injury, playing for Brentford’s Development Squad against Charlton Athletic’s reserve team and scored, as well as, setting up one of the goals, in a 4–2 win. On 20 April 2013, El Alagui made his first appearance in the club’s first team, coming on as a 75th-minute substitute replacing goalscorer Marcello Trotta, in a 1–1 draw against Hartlepool United. After the match, he said: "To get 10 or 15 minutes on Saturday was unbelievable. It was great to be among the lads on a matchday. I feared I was going to miss the rest of the season when I got injured. I was scared, but after seeing the specialist we decided to give the knee time to recover rather than having an operation." El Alagui made one substitute appearance during Brentford's unsuccessful playoff campaign, coming against Swindon Town. He finished the 2012–13 season having scored three goals in 12 appearances.

At the start of the 2013–14 season, El Alagui scored twice for Brentford, in a 3–2 win against Dagenham & Redbridge in the first round of the League Cup. Shortly after the match, he spoke out his determination to fight for his place in the first team. A week later on 17 August 2013, El Alagui scored a crucial injury time equaliser in a 1–1 draw with Gillingham. He, once again, scored two goals in Brentford's 5–3 Football League Trophy first round win over AFC Wimbledon on 3 September 2013. However, by November and having started in only three of his first 12 appearances of the 2013–14 season, El Alagui expressed his frustration at being unable to force his way into Uwe Rösler's plans. On 7 December 2013, he notched his sixth goal of the season in a 3–2 FA Cup second round defeat to Carlisle United. News reports surfaced in mid-December that before his departure as manager, Rösler gave the go-ahead for El Alagui to move to Scottish Premiership club Partick Thistle on loan in January 2014, but El Alagui rubbished the speculation and reaffirmed his commitment to Brentford. What would be El Alagui's final appearance for the Bees came in a 3–1 victory over Milton Keynes Dons on 29 December, replacing Marcello Trotta after 81 minutes. El Alagui made 18 appearances and scored six goals during the 2013–14 season. He made 30 appearances and scored 9 goals during his two seasons with the club, his time with the Bees largely disrupted by his knee injury suffered in October 2012.

==== Dundee United (loan) ====
On 8 January 2014, El Alagui moved to Scottish Premiership club Dundee United on loan until the end of the 2013–14 season.

On 12 January 2014, he made his debut for the club against Inverness CT in a 1–1 draw, after coming on as a substitute for the injured Brian Graham in the 52nd minute. Two weeks later on 1 February 2014, El Alagui scored his first goal for the club, in a 1–1 draw with Partick Thistle. He found his playing time, coming from the substitute bench in a number of matches. On 28 February 2014, El Alagui scored his second goal for Dundee United, in a 3–1 win against Hibernian. On 3 May 2014, he scored his third goal for the club, in a 1–1 draw against Inverness Caledonian Thistle. At the end of the 2013–14 season, El Alagui finished the season having scored three goals in 15 appearances and, as he had been previously released by Brentford a week before his loan spell had finished, he left and became a free agent.

=== Hibernian ===
On 14 July 2014, El Alagui signed a two-year contract with Scottish Championship club Hibernian in July 2014.

He made his debut for the club, starting the whole game, in a 2–1 loss against Rangers in the first round of the Scottish League Cup. El Alagui scored his first goal for Hibernian on 9 August 2014, in a 2–1 home win against Livingston in the opening league match of the season. He scored again in the following match, the Edinburgh derby against Hearts on 17 August 2014, although it was only a consolation goal as the club lost 2–1. On 26 August 2014, El Alagui scored twice for Hibernian, in a 3–2 win against Dumbarton in the second round of the Scottish League Cup. On 30 August 2014, El Alagui had to go off injured in the first half as Hibernian lost 2–1 against Alloa Athletic, with the club fearing he had a ruptured an achilles' tendon. He then had surgery on the injury and it was expected he would be out for four to six months. By March, El Alagui made his return to full training. On 28 March 2015, he made his return from injury, coming on as a 77th-minute substitute, in a 2–1 loss against Raith Rovers. On his return from injury, El Alagui came on as a substitute in an Edinburgh derby against Hearts. He scored in the dying minutes to wrap up a 2–0 victory for Hibernian. El Alagui later reflected on the goal, saying: "He derby when we won and I scored was the best moment for me. It was very special. It was a highlight of my football career in general, not just my Hibs career." However, El Alagui missed one match due to a knee injury. But he made his return from injury in the return, coming on as a 54th-minute substitute, in a 1–0 win against Rangers in the second leg of the semi–finals of Premiership play-offs, but the club were eliminated from the play-offs following a 2–1 loss on aggregate. At the end of the 2014–15 season, El Alagui made thirteen appearances and scoring five goals in all competitions.

Complications from the earlier surgery meant that El Alagui did not play for Hibs during the early part of the 2015–16 season. On 4 November 2015, he made his first appearance of the season, coming on as a 86th-minute substitute, in a 3–0 win against Dundee United in the quarter–finals of the Scottish League Cup. However, following his return from injury, El Alagui found his first team opportunities limited at the club, due to a competitions in the forward position and did not play in the first team for months. On 24 February 2016, he made his first appearance for Hibernian in three months, coming on as a 74th-minute substitute, in a 3–0 loss against Greenock Morton. In a follow–up match against Dumbarton, El Alagui scored his first goal of the season, in a 3–2 loss. On 2 April 2016, he then scored his second goal of the season, in a 2–2 draw against St Mirren. After the match, manager Alan Stubbs commented on El Alagui’s fitness, saying: "El Alagui had such a horrendous injury that when he recovered everybody thought he was ready but wasn’t. In the early part, El Alagui was quite a bit off it and he needed to get to the strength back up in his calves and his quads to give him that power. El Alagui doesn’t have Superman calves at the best of times. We’ve had to do tests with him to see how much he was lacking in terms of strength, so it’s been a long process. El Alagui offers a different element to our game and it’s something that could come in very useful for us between now and end of the season. He has a physical element and we can look to get the ball forward rather than pass and create the goal that’s pleasing on the eye." However, during a match against Livingston on 5 April 2016, El Alagui suffered a hamstring injury and was substituted in the 39th minute, as the club won 2–1. After the match, it was announced that he would be out for three weeks but never played for the rest of the 2015–16 season following his return from injury. At the end of the 2015–16 season, El Alagui made eight appearances and scoring two times in all competitions.

On 8 June 2016, El Alagui was released by Hibernian at the end of his contract. His departure from the club was confirmed on 5 July 2016. Subsequently, El Alagui appeared as a trialist for Inverness Caledonian Thistle and Dunfermline Athletic.

=== Dunfermline Athletic ===
After a trial period with Scottish Championship club Dunfermline Athletic, El Alagui signed a short-term contract with the club until January 2017.

His first appearances for the Pars came from the substitute bench against Dundee United on 10 September 2016, in a 3–1 loss. On 24 September 2016, El Alagui's scored a dramatic 85th-minute winner against St Mirren in a match that ended 4–3 to Dunfermline Athletic. On 8 October 2016, he scored twice for Dunfermline Athletic, in a 2–1 victory against Queen's Park in the Scottish Challenge Cup helped the club progress to the next round. In a follow–up match, El Alagui made his first full start coming against his former club Falkirk on 15 October 2016 and scored a late consolation, in a 2–1 loss. El Alagui scoring all three goals in the match led to him claiming an unusual hat-trick.

After missing one match due to a calf injury, he made his return from injury, starting the whole game, in a 0–0 draw against Raith Rovers on 5 November 2016. Following the match, El Alagui found his playing time reduced and his goal scoring form suffered. El Alagui's final appearance for the club came as a late substitute against Ayr United.

With his short-term expiring in January, manager Allan Johnston stated that he was keen on keeping El Alagui. Johnston also acknowledged that Dunfermline Athletic’s finance could be a deciding factor on keeping the player. On 20 January 2017, he was offered a new contract by the Pars. After turning down a new contract with the club, El Alagui departed Dunfermline on 23 January 2017, with the intention of moving to play in Asia. In his brief spell with the club, El Alagui's made a total of 16 appearances for the Pars, with the majority coming as a substitute. Although he scored only four times in his four months with the club, three of these goals gave the club important wins over St Mirren and Queen's Park.

=== Ayr United ===
El Alagui subsequently signed for fellow Scottish Championship club Ayr United on 7 February 2017, on a contract until the end of the 2016–17 season. Upon joining the club, he stated his determination to keep Ayr United’s survival hopes in the Scottish Championship.

El Alagui made his debut for the club, starting a match and played 45 minutes before being substituted at half-time, in a 2–2 draw against Dumbarton on 18 February 2017. On 1 March 2017, he scored his first goal at Somerset Park, in a 1–0 win against Raith Rovers. El Alagui played a role at Somerset Park against Dumbarton on 25 March 2017 when he scored the equalising goal and set up a goal, in a 2–1 win. A week later on 1 April 2017, El Alagui scored a consolation goal, in a 2–1 loss against St Mirren. However, he failed to fulfil Ayr United’s promise when the club were relegated to Scottish League One after losing 2–1 against Raith Rovers on the last game of the season. At the end of the 2016–17 season, El Alagui made eleven appearances and scoring three times in all competitions.

Following this, El Alagui was released by Ayr United.

=== Edinburgh City ===
After spending a number of months without a club, El Alagui played as a trialist for Scottish League Two club Edinburgh City on 4 November 2017, in a match against Stirling Albion, where he set up a goal, in a 2–1 loss. Shortly after, he signed a deal with the club until the end of the 2017–18 season.

Since joining Edinburgh City, El Alagui became a first team regular, becoming their first-choice striker. On 9 December 2017, he scored his first goal for the club, in a 1–1 draw against Elgin City. In a follow–up match against Stenhousemuir, El Alagui made a mistake for missing a penalty after he slipped and sent the ball high over the bar, in a 2–1 loss. In a follow–up match, El Alagui learned from his mistake when he scored his second goal for Edinburgh City, in a 2–1 loss against Annan Athletic on 23 December 2017. However, in a match against Montrose on 13 January 2018, El Alagui received a red card for a second bookable offence, in a 2–0 loss. After a one match suspension, he returned to the first team, coming on as a 82nd-minute substitute, in a 3–2 loss against Clyde on 3 February 2018. On 24 February 2018, El Alagui scored his third goal of the season, in a 4–0 win against Elgin City. On 27 March 2018, he scored his fourth goal of the season, in a 2–2 draw against Stirling Albion. At the end of the 2017–18 season, El Alagui made twenty–three appearances and scoring four times in all competitions. Following this, he left the club at the end of his contract on 11 May 2018.

=== FC Marmande 47 ===
On 17 August 2018, El Alagui returned to France by joining hometown club FC Marmande 47 on a free transfer.

On 3 September 2018, he made his debut for the club, where he had his penalty saved, in a 3–0 win against CA Pondaurat. In a follow–up match against Elan Béarnais Orthez, he scored his first goal for FC Marmande 47, in a 1–1 draw. On 22 October 2018, El Alagui scored FC Marmande 47’s second goal of the game, in a 5–4 win against FC Tartas Saint Yaguen. On 26 November 2018, he scored the club’s first goal of the game, in a 2–2 draw against FC Portes Entre Deux Mers. This was followed up in the next two matches against Aviron Bayonnais and a hat–trick against Langon FC. On 28 January 2019, El Alagui scored his eighth goal of the season. On 25 February 2019, he scored the opening goal of the game, in a 3–0 win against AS Lusitanos Cenon. El Alagui scored twice on 6 May 2019 and 13 May 2019 against Langon FC and Saint-Pierre-d'Irube respectively. However, he soon an injury that ruled him for the rest of the 2018–19 season.

After a final season with, El Alagui retired from football on 8 June 2019.

== Coaching career ==
After retiring from professional football, El Alagui began working as U16 coach at FC Marmande 47. He previously stated his desire to become a sport director or a general manager while also setting up an academy. El Alagui reflected on his first full season at FC Marmande 47, balancing his role as coach and sporting director. On 11 October 2021, the club announced the departure of El Alagui’s role as coach and sporting director.

== Personal life ==
In addition to speaking French, El Alagui is fluent in English. He is a Moroccan descent and has one sister. Prior to becoming a footballer, El Alagui studied finance and even worked in a bank. El Alagui’s mother works in a catering business.

El Alagui became famous among the Falkirk supporters for "Kissing the Coin" after every goal, the lucky coin being kept by the backroom staff at the touchline. He continued to follow his same trait after leaving Falkirk.

El Alagui said about his background: ""I feel both Moroccan and French, but my origin and my heart are Moroccan. My blood is Moroccan." He said his idol was Marouane Chamakh. El Alagui is married to his Scottish wife, Jenna and together, they have one daughter. Following his injury against Alloa Athletic on 30 August 2014, El Alagui never play in the artificial pitch for the rest of his playing career. El Alagui splits his time at Edinburgh and Bordeaux where he is studying for a degree in sports management. El Alagui eventually received his degree in sports management at University of Lyon.

== Career statistics ==
Appearances and goals by club, season and competition
Club	Season	League			National cup		League cup		Other		Total	
Club	Season	Division	Apps	Goals	Apps	Goals	Apps	Goals	Apps	Goals	Apps	Goals
Bergerac Foot	2008–09	Championnat de France Amateur Group C	31	10	1	0	—		—		32	10
SO Romorantin	2010–11	Championnat de France Amateur Group D	27	14	—		—		—		27	14
Falkirk	2011–12	Scottish First Division	33	18	2	1	5	6	3 (Note: Appearances in Scottish Challenge Cup)	2	43	27
Brentford	2012–13	League One	11	3	0	0	0	0	1 (Note: Appearances in Football League Trophy)	0	12	3
Brentford	2013–14	League One	12	1	2	1	2	2	2	2	18	6
Brentford	Total		23	4	2	1	2	2	3	2	30	9
Dundee United (loan)	2013–14	Scottish Premiership	13	3	2	0	—		—		15	3
Hibernian	2014–15	Scottish Championship	9	3	1	0	1	2	2 (Note: One appearance in Scottish Challenge Cup; one appearance in Scottish Premiership play-offs)	0	13	5
Hibernian	2015–16	Scottish Championship	6	2	1	0	1	0	0	0	8	2
Hibernian	Total		15	5	2	0	2	2	2	0	21	7
Dunfermline Athletic	2016–17	Scottish Championship	13	2	1	0	—		2	2	16	4
Ayr United	2016–17	Scottish Championship	11	3	—		—		—		11	3
Edinburgh City	2017–18	Scottish League Two	22	4	—		—		—		22	4
Career total			188	63	9	2	9	10	10	6	217	81

== Honours ==
Falkirk

- Scottish Challenge Cup: 2011–12

=== Individual ===
- PFA First Division Player of the Year: 2011–12
- PFA Scotland First Division Team of the Year: 2011–12
