= 2007–08 Falkirk F.C. season =

Falkirk F.C.
2007–08 season
- Manager: John Hughes
- Stadium: Falkirk Stadium
- Scottish Premier League: Seventh Place
- Scottish Cup: Fourth round
- Scottish League Cup: Third round
- Top goalscorer: League: Michael Higdon (8); All: Michael Higdon & Pedro Moutinho (8)
- Highest home attendance: 6,803
- Lowest home attendance: 4,490
- Average home league attendance: 5,567

During the 2007–08 Scottish football season, Falkirk competed in the Scottish Premier League.

== Season summary ==
Falkirk repeated last season's 7th-placed finish.

== Kit ==
Falkirk's kit was manufactured by Lotto, following the end of Falkirk's deal with TFG. The kit was sponsored by Central Demolition.

The home kit was designed to resemble Falkirk's kit from their 1957 Scottish Cup triumph, to commemorate the 50th anniversary of the victory.

== First-team squad ==
Squad at end of season

Note: Flags indicate national team as defined under FIFA eligibility rules; some limited exceptions apply. Players may hold more than one non-FIFA nationality.

| No. | Pos. | Nation | Player |
|---|---|---|---|
| 1 | GK | NED | Tim Krul (on loan from Newcastle United) |
| 3 | DF | ENG | Dean Holden |
| 4 | MF | IRL | Patrick Cregg |
| 5 | DF | SCO | Jack Ross |
| 6 | MF | SCO | Kevin McBride |
| 7 | FW | POR | Pedro Moutinho |
| 8 | FW | IRL | Billy Clarke (on loan from Ipswich Town) |
| 9 | FW | IRL | Graham Barrett |
| 10 | MF | TRI | Russell Latapy |
| 11 | FW | ENG | Michael Higdon |
| 12 | MF | IRL | Stephen Bradley |
| 14 | DF | NED | Gerard Aafjes |
| 15 | DF | SCO | Kenny Milne |
| 16 | MF | SCO | Scott Arfield |
| 17 | GK | AUT | Bobby Olejnik |
| 18 | DF | SCO | Brian Allison |
| 19 | MF | ESP | Arnau Riera (on loan from Sunderland) |
| 20 | MF | SCO | Darren Barr |
| 21 | FW | ENG | Carl Finnigan |

| No. | Pos. | Nation | Player |
|---|---|---|---|
| 22 | DF | SCO | Chris Mitchell |
| 23 | FW | SCO | Kevin Moffat |
| 24 | FW | SCO | Mark Stewart |
| 27 | MF | SCO | Dayne Robertson |
| 30 | GK | SCO | Jamie Barclay |
| 31 | DF | SCO | Scott Gibb |
| 33 | DF | SCO | Tam Scobbie |
| 34 | DF | SCO | Mark Staunton |
| 35 | MF | SCO | Stewart Murdoch |
| 40 | GK | IRL | Shane Supple (on loan from Ipswich Town) |
| 41 | GK | SCO | Michael Andrews |
| 42 | DF | SCO | Allan Galbraith |
| 43 | DF | SCO | Peter McMahon |
| 44 | DF | SCO | Kieran Stallard |
| 45 | DF | SCO | Calum McLean |
| 47 | MF | SCO | Lee Nichol |
| 48 | MF | SCO | Craig McLeish |
| 49 | FW | SCO | Paul Sludden |

=== Left club during season ===
Note: Flags indicate national team as defined under FIFA eligibility rules; some limited exceptions apply. Players may hold more than one non-FIFA nationality.

| No. | Pos. | Nation | Player |
|---|---|---|---|
| 8 | MF | SCO | Steven Thomson (to Brighton & Hove Albion) |
| 25 | FW | AUT | Roman Wallner (to Apollon Kalamarias) |
| 26 | MF | SCO | Liam Craig (on loan to St Johnstone) |

| No. | Pos. | Nation | Player |
|---|---|---|---|
| 29 | FW | SCO | Graeme Churchill (to Stirling Albion) |
| 50 | FW | SCO | Christopher Jeffrey (released) |

== League table ==
| Pos | Team | Pld | W | D | L | GF | GA | GD | Pts | Qualification or relegation (Note: Teams played each other three times (33 matches), before the league split into two groups (the top six and the bottom six) for the last five matches.) |
|---|---|---|---|---|---|---|---|---|---|---|
| 5 | Dundee United | 38 | 14 | 10 | 14 | 53 | 47 | +6 | 52 | |
| 6 | Hibernian | 38 | 14 | 10 | 14 | 49 | 45 | +4 | 52 | Qualification for the Intertoto Cup second round (Note: Hibernian qualified for the Intertoto Cup as the highest ranked club to apply for a place in the competition.) |
| 7 | Falkirk | 38 | 13 | 10 | 15 | 45 | 49 | −4 | 49 | |
| 8 | Heart of Midlothian | 38 | 13 | 9 | 16 | 47 | 55 | −8 | 48 | |
| 9 | Inverness Caledonian Thistle | 38 | 13 | 4 | 21 | 51 | 62 | −11 | 43 | |

Source: Scottish Professional Football League
Rules for classification: 1) Points; 2) Goal difference; 3) Goals scored
