= 2008–09 Falkirk F.C. season =

Falkirk
2008–09 season
- Chairman: Campbell Christie
- Manager: John Hughes
- Stadium: Falkirk Stadium
- Scottish Premier League: Tenth Place
- League Cup: Semi-final
- Scottish Cup: Runners-up
- Top goalscorer: League: Steve Lovell (8); All: Scott Arfield & Steve Lovell (10)
- Highest home attendance: 6,853 vs. Rangers, 5 April 2009
- Lowest home attendance: 4,385 vs. Dundee United, 3 March 2009
- Average home league attendance: 5,640
Home colours	Away colours

The 2008–09 season was Falkirk's fourth consecutive season in the Scottish Premier League. Falkirk also competed in the League Cup and the Scottish Cup.

== Summary ==
In their fourth season in the SPL, Falkirk finished in tenth place. The club reached the semi-final of the League Cup, and ended as runners in the Scottish Cup, losing to Rangers in both matches.

== Results ==
Win Draw Loss

=== Pre-season ===
Date	Venue	Opponents	Result F–A	Attendance	Falkirk scorer(s)	Ref.
22 July 2008	Falkirk Stadium	Ross County	2–2		Higdon, Finnigan	
23 July 2008	Shielfield Park	Berwick Rangers	1–2		J.Stewart	
26 July 2008	Falkirk Stadium	Queens Park Rangers	2–0		Own goal, J.Stewart	
28 July 2008	Falkirk Stadium	Alloa Athletic	0–0			
30 July 2008	Cambuur Stadion	SC Cambuur	0–1			
1 August 2008	De Langeleegte	BV Veendam	2–0		Finnigan, J.Stewart	
2 August 2008	Abe Lenstra Stadion	SC Heerenveen	0–4			

=== Scottish Premier League ===
Date	Venue	Opponents	Result F–A	Attendance	Falkirk scorer(s)	Ref.
9 August 2008	Falkirk Stadium	Rangers	0–1	6,669		
16 August 2008	Easter Road	Hibernian	2–3	12,445	Higdon 30', 53'	
23 August 2008	Celtic Park	Celtic	0–3	56,031		
30 August 2008	Falkirk Stadium	Inverness CT	1–2	4,730	M.Stewart 60'	
13 September 2008	Falkirk Stadium	Heart of Midlothian	2–1	5,960	McCann 3', Arfield 90'	
20 September 2008	Love Street	St Mirren	1–1	4,134	Barrett 47'	
27 September 2008	Falkirk Stadium	Hamilton Academical	4–1	4,734	Lovell 44', Arfield 69', 87' pen., O'Brien 79'	
5 October 2008	Fir Park	Motherwell	2–3	4,509	Lovell 22', Barrett 48'	
18 October 2008	Falkirk Stadium	Aberdeen	0–1	5,662		
25 October 2008	Rugby Park	Kilmarnock	2–1	4,267	Lovell 28', Arfield 66' pen.	
1 November 2008	Falkirk Stadium	Dundee United	0–0	5,608		
8 November 2008	New Douglas Park	Hamilton Academical	1–1	2,600	Higdon 49'	
12 November 2008	Caledonian Stadium	Inverness CT	1–1	3,111	Higdon 19'	
15 November 2008	Falkirk Stadium	Motherwell	1–0	5,279	Higdon 37'	
22 November 2008	Tynecastle Stadium	Heart of Midlothian	1–2	13,009	Lovell 16'	
29 November 2008	Falkirk Stadium	Hibernian	1–1	6,260	Barr 69'	
6 December 2008	Falkirk Stadium	St Mirren	1–2	4,828	Lovell 62'	
13 December 2008	Pittodrie Stadium	Aberdeen	1–2	8,909	Lovell 89'	
21 December 2008	Falkirk Stadium	Celtic	0–3	6,543		
27 December 2008	Tannadice Park	Dundee United	0–1	7,972		
3 January 2009	Falkirk Stadium	Kilmarnock	1–1	5,375	Lovell 41'	
17 January 2009	Ibrox Stadium	Rangers	1–3	48,811	Lovell 12'	
24 January 2009	Fir Park	Motherwell	1–1	5,018	Holden 53'	
31 January 2009	Falkirk Stadium	Aberdeen	1–0	5,605	Higdon 55'	
14 February 2009	St Mirren Park	St Mirren	2–2	5,504	Finnigan 35', Arfield 85' pen.	
21 February 2009	Falkirk Stadium	Hamilton Academical	1–2	5,307	Swailes 6' o.g.	
28 February 2009	Easter Road	Hibernian	0–0	10,682		
3 March 2009	Falkirk Stadium	Dundee United	0–1	4,385		
21 March 2009	Falkirk Stadium	Inverness CT	4–0	5,523	Finnigan 37', 90' M.Stewart 65', Arfield 82' pen.	
5 April 2009	Falkirk Stadium	Rangers	0–1	6,853		
8 April 2009	Celtic Park	Celtic	0–4	57,669		
11 April 2009	Rugby Park	Kilmarnock	0–3	5,835		
18 April 2009	Falkirk Stadium	Heart of Midlothian	0–0	6,156		
2 May 2009	Falkirk Stadium	Motherwell	2–1	4,937	Finnigan 9', Scobbie 56'	
9 May 2009	Rugby Park	Kilmarnock	1–1	5,955	Barr 56'	
13 May 2009	New Douglas Park	Hamilton Academical	1–0	3,710	Arfield 60'	
16 May 2009	Falkirk Stadium	St Mirren	0–2	6,744		
23 May 2009	Caledonian Stadium	Inverness CT	1–0	6,489	Higdon 68'	

=== Scottish League Cup ===
Round	Date	Opponent	Venue	Result	Attendance	Goalscorers	Match Report
Second round	26 August 2008	Raith Rovers	Stark's Park	3–1	2,090	Higdon 16', J.Stewart 35' pen., M.Stewart 84'	
Third round	23 September 2008	Queen of the South	Falkirk Stadium	2–1	2,058	McCann 29', Lovell 73'	
Quarter-final	28 October 2008	Inverness CT	Falkirk Stadium	1–0	3,007	McCann 36'	
Semi-final	27 January 2009	Rangers	Hampden Park	0–3	24,507		

=== Scottish Cup ===
Round	Date	Opponent	Venue	Result	Attendance	Goalscorers	Ref.
Fourth Round	10 January 2009	Queen of the South	Falkirk Stadium	4–2	3,423	Arfield 37' pen., 48' Barrett 68', 81'	
Fifth Round	7 February 2009	Heart of Midlothian	Tynecastle Stadium	1–0	14,569	Lovell 59'	
Quarter-final	7 March 2009	Inverness CT	Caledonian Stadium	1–0	3,024	Finnigan 31' pen.	
Semi-final	26 April 2009	Dunfermline Athletic	Hampden Park	2–0	17,124	Scobbie 54', Arfield 89' pen.	
Final	30 May 2009	Rangers	Hampden Park	0–1	50,956		

== Squad statistics ==
=== Player statistics ===
As of 30 May 2009(UTC)

No.	Pos	Nat	Player	Total		Premier League		League Cup		Scottish Cup	
No.	Pos	Nat	Player	Apps	Goals	Apps	Goals	Apps	Goals	Apps	Goals
1	GK	(Spain) ESP	Dani Mallo	20	0	15+0	0	1+0	0	4+0	0
2	DF	(Scotland) SCO	Lee Bullen	37	0	29+3	0	2+0	0	3+0	0
3	DF	(Northern Ireland) NIR	Dean Holden	22	1	16+3	1	1+0	0	1+1	0
4	MF	(Republic of Ireland) IRL	Patrick Cregg	31	0	16+7	0	2+2	0	2+2	0
5	DF	(Scotland) SCO	Jackie McNamara	37	0	29+0	0	4+0	0	4+0	0
6	MF	(Scotland) SCO	Kevin McBride	35	0	25+3	0	4+0	0	2+1	0
7	MF	(Scotland) SCO	Neil McCann	31	3	22+2	1	3+0	2	4+0	0
8	MF	(Spain) ESP	Arnau Riera	20	0	14+3	0	0+0	0	3+0	0
10	DF	(Scotland) SCO	Steven Pressley	19	0	15+1	0	1+0	0	2+0	0
11	FW	(England) ENG	Michael Higdon	42	8	27+7	7	3+1	1	3+1	0
12	MF	(Republic of Ireland) IRL	Stephen Bradley	4	0	4+0	0	0+0	0	0+0	0
14	DF	(Netherlands) NED	Gerard Aafjes	23	0	10+7	0	3+0	0	2+1	0
15	FW	(England) ENG	Steve Lovell	33	10	25+3	8	2+0	1	3+0	1
16	MF	(Canada) CAN	Scott Arfield	45	10	35+2	7	4+0	0	4+0	3
17	GK	(Austria) AUT	Bobby Olejnik	18	0	15+0	0	2+0	0	1+0	0
18	DF	(Scotland) SCO	Brian Allison	0	0	0+0	0	0+0	0	0+0	0
19	MF	(Scotland) SCO	Sean Lynch	0	0	0+0	0	0+0	0	0+0	0
20	DF	(Scotland) SCO	Darren Barr	44	2	35+0	2	4+0	0	5+0	0
21	FW	(England) ENG	Carl Finnigan	19	5	10+4	4	0+0	0	2+3	1
22	DF	(Scotland) SCO	Chris Mitchell	10	0	3+6	0	0+1	0	0+0	0
23	FW	(Scotland) SCO	Kevin Moffat	4	0	0+4	0	0+0	0	0+0	0
24	FW	(Scotland) SCO	Mark Stewart	27	3	5+15	2	1+2	1	1+3	0
29	MF	(Scotland) SCO	Sean Lynch	2	0	0+2	0	0+0	0	0+0	0
30	GK	(Scotland) SCO	Jamie Barclay	0	0	0+0	0	0+0	0	0+0	0
31	DF	(Northern Ireland) NIR	Dermot McCaffrey	2	0	1+1	0	0+0	0	0+0	0
33	DF	(Scotland) SCO	Tam Scobbie	27	2	18+2	1	2+1	0	4+0	1
34	FW	(Scotland) SCO	Dayne Robertson	4	0	0+4	0	0+0	0	0+0	0
35	DF	(Scotland) SCO	Mark Staunton	0	0	0+0	0	0+0	0	0+0	0
47	MF	(Scotland) SCO	Burton O'Brien	39	1	30+2	1	1+1	0	4+1	0
56	DF	(Sweden) SWE	Erik Schultz-Eklund	0	0	0+0	0	0+0	0	0+0	0
Players who left the club during the 2008–09 season
9	FW	(Republic of Ireland) IRL	Graham Barrett	19	4	9+6	2	2+1	0	1+0	2
10	MF	(Trinidad and Tobago) TRI	Russell Latapy	4	0	2+1	0	0+1	0	0+0	0
13	GK	(England) ENG	Scott Flinders	9	0	8+0	0	1+0	0	0+0	0
25	FW	(Scotland) SCO	John Stewart	5	1	4+0	0	1+0	1	0+0	0

== Team statistics ==
=== League table ===
Pos	Team	Pld	W	D	L	GF	GA	GD	Pts	Qualification or relegation (Note: Teams played each other three times (33 matches), before the league split into two groups (the top six and the bottom six) for the last five matches.)
8	Kilmarnock	38	12	8	18	38	48	−10	44	
9	Hamilton Academical	38	12	5	21	30	53	−23	41	
10	Falkirk	38	9	11	18	37	52	−15	38	Qualification for the Europa League second qualifying round (Note: Since Rangers, the winners of the Scottish Cup, already qualified for the Champions League via their league position, Falkirk, the losing finalist, earned a spot in the Europa League.)
11	St Mirren	38	9	10	19	33	52	−19	37	
12	Inverness Caledonian Thistle (R)	38	10	7	21	37	58	−21	37	Relegation to the First Division

Source: Scottish Professional Football League
Rules for classification: 1) Points; 2) Goal difference; 3) Goals scored
(R) Relegated

== Transfers ==
=== Players in ===
Player	From	Fee
(Northern Ireland) Dermot McCaffrey	(Scotland) Hibernian	Free
(Scotland) Jackie McNamara	(Scotland) Aberdeen	Free
(Scotland) Lee Bullen	(England) Sheffield Wednesday	Free
(Scotland) Neil McCann	(Scotland) Heart of Midlothian	Free
(Sweden) Erik Schultz-Eklund	(Scotland) Gretna	Free
(Scotland) Burton O'Brien	(England) Sheffield Wednesday	Free
(England) Ashley Young	(England) Bury	Free
(Spain) Arnau Riera	(England) Sunderland	Loan
(England) Steve Lovell	(Scotland) Aberdeen	Free
(England) Scott Flinders	(England) Crystal Palace	Loan
(Scotland) Sean Lynch	(Scotland) Hibernian	Free
(Scotland) Steven Pressley	(Denmark) Randers	Free
(Spain) Dani Mallo	(Portugal) Braga	Free

=== Players out ===
Player	To	Fee
(Portugal) Pedro Moutinho	(Portugal) Marítimo	Free
(Scotland) Liam Craig	(Scotland) St Johnstone	£25,000
(Scotland) Jack Ross	(Scotland) St Mirren	Free
(Scotland) Kenny Milne	(England) Scunthorpe United	Free
(Scotland) Peter McMahon	(Scotland) Berwick Rangers	Free
(Scotland) Jamie Barclay	(Scotland) East Stirlingshire	Loan
(Scotland) Scott Gibb	(Scotland) Stirling Albion	Loan
(Scotland) John Stewart	(Scotland) Ross County	Undisclosed
(Trinidad and Tobago) Russell Latapy	(Trinidad and Tobago) Caledonia AIA	Free
(Republic of Ireland) Graham Barrett	(Scotland) St Johnstone	Undisclosed
