= 2009 Scottish Cup final =

2009 Scottish Cup Final
- Event: 2008–09 Scottish Cup
Rangers	Falkirk
1	0
- Date: 30 May 2009
- Venue: Hampden Park, Glasgow
- Man of the Match: David Weir
- Referee: Craig Thomson
- Attendance: 50,956

The 2009 Scottish Cup Final was the final of the 124th season of the main domestic football cup competition in Scotland, the Scottish Cup. The final was played at Hampden Park in Glasgow on 30 May 2009. The match was contested by Rangers, who were defending the trophy having won the 2008 final, and Falkirk who last won the Cup in 1957.

Falkirk were contesting a Scottish Cup final for only the fourth time in their history, while it was Rangers' 51st appearance (winning 32 times and losing 17, with one final (1909) resulting in the cup being withheld). It was Rangers' second cup final of the season, having lost to Celtic in the League Cup Final on 15 March 2009.

== Route to the Final ==
=== Rangers ===
Round	Opposition	Score
Fourth round	St Johnstone (a)	0–2
Fifth round	Forfar Athletic (a)	0–4
Quarter-final	Hamilton Academical (h)	5–1
Semi-final	St Mirren (n)	3–0

Rangers first match of the 2008–09 Scottish Cup was away to Scottish First Division leaders St Johnstone. The match at McDiarmid Park was played on a Tuesday night due to BBC Sport Scotland's live coverage. An own goal from Saints defender Stuart McCaffrey gave Rangers the lead just before half-time and a late Nacho Novo strike with ten minutes left made the game safe.

The match against Scottish Third Division side Forfar Athletic was to be shown on Sky Sports and was therefore originally planned as a lunchtime kick-off on Sunday 8 February but was postponed due to a frozen pitch, the game was rescheduled and played on Wednesday 18 February. Rangers took an early lead in the match thanks to a Saša Papac goal after only eight minutes but the team could not add to their advantage until after half-time. A Kenny Miller double and Aarón Ñíguez's first Rangers goal ensured the team's progress in a 4–0 win.

The quarter-final was the first tie played at Ibrox by Rangers in the Scottish cup that season. The game ended in a convincing 5–1 win over Scottish Premier League side Hamilton Academical. The scoring was opened by Steven Whittaker before Hamilton's Rocco Quinn equalised. Rangers again took the lead through Kyle Lafferty before Aarón Ñíguez netted a retaken penalty as half time approached. Hamilton played most of the second half with 10 men due to injuries, goals after the break from Steven Davis and another from Kyle Lafferty completed the win.

The semi-final at Hampden Park was played against fellow Scottish Premier League side St Mirren. After just 75 seconds of the match Rangers were ahead through an Andrius Velička goal. Kris Boyd's 100th Rangers goal after 66 minutes made it 2–0 and a Kenny Miller goal twenty minutes from time saw Rangers through to their second successive final.

=== Falkirk ===
Round	Opposition	Score
Fourth round	Queen of the South (h)	4–2
Fifth round	Heart of Midlothian (a)	0–1
Quarter-final	Inverness CT (a)	0–1
Semi-final	Dunfermline Athletic (n)	2–0

Falkirk's first Scottish Cup match of the season was against the runners-up from the previous season, Queen of the South. Falkirk took the lead after Craig Barr fouled Graham Barrett, Scott Arfield converted the penalty. Queen's equalised five minutes later through a deflected Barry Wilson strike to leave the score level at half-time. Despite a superb free kick by Bob Harris to give Queen of the South a 2–1 lead, Falkirk went on to score a further three goals to win 4–2. A Graham Barrett double and a second from Arfield.

The Bairns faced Scottish Premier League opposition in the next round in the shape of Heart of Midlothian. A Steve Lovell header after 59 minutes sent Hearts out of the Cup in a game which saw two red cards, one for each side. Heart's Marius Žaliūkas was sent-off after wrestling Carl Finnigan to the ground and Falkirk's Arfield was shown red for a second bookable offence.

A trip to the Highlands ensued for the quarter-final after Falkirk were drawn away to Inverness Caledonian Thistle. A victory was secured by a Carl Finnigan penalty after 31 minutes when Lionel Djebi-Zadi was sent off for grappling with the striker inside the penalty box.

The semi-final match against Dunfermline Athletic was played at Hampden Park despite the Scottish Football Association offering to change the match to a different venue. Tam Scobbie opened the scoring when he knocked a Neil McCann free kick into the Pars goal with his shoulder early in the second half. The win was assured after Scott Arfield converted a penalty in the 89th minute, McCann had won the spot kick after being brought down by Dunfermline's Greg Ross.

== Background ==
Rangers went into the match as 32-time winners of the competition; they were the defending champions having won in 2008, this was their 50th final overall. Falkirk won the cup in 1913 and 1957; they reached the final in 1997 but lost.

Rangers had just won the Scottish Premier League to become Scottish champions and Falkirk had narrowly avoided relegation from the SPL; both had done so in the last match of their respective league seasons. The two teams had met each other four times that season three league meetings which were all won by Rangers and a Scottish League Cup Semi-final which Rangers also won. Falkirk had not beaten Rangers in any competition since an SPL meeting in December 2006, They had last met Rangers in the Scottish Cup in a 1998–99 Quarter-final which Rangers won 2–1, The last time they beat Rangers in a cup competition was in the 1994–95 League Cup, They had never previously met in a Cup Final.

== Pre-match ==
=== Ticket allocation ===
Rangers were allocated 24,890 tickets for the final, while Falkirk received 11,740 tickets with another 3,200 available if needed. Falkirk had originally wanted an allocation similar to Rangers. All Falkirk season ticket holders were guaranteed a seat for the final. SFA spokesman Rob Shorthouse told BBC Scotland at the end of April that it would be fair to both clubs and wanted to avoid unsold tickets being returned. Both semi-finals at Hampden were well below the 52,000 stadium capacity, with only 32,341 supporters watching Rangers beat St Mirren 3–0 in the first semi-final at Hampden, while 17,124 watched Falkirk's victory over Dunfermline 24 hours later.

On 27 May 2009, it was reported that Falkirk had failed to sell its originally allocation of tickets, only 12,200 to date, this meant that the club would be limited to 13,000 tickets in total. Meanwhile, Rangers were given an additional 3,000 tickets on top of there allocation which would now mean that the Glasgow club had a total of 28,000 for the final. Despite this, Falkirk supporters turned up in their droves to support their club, the official match attendance being recorded at 50,956.

=== Gowans asked to lead out Falkirk ===
As a mark of respect for a former Falkirk youth team player, Craig Gowans, who died in a tragic accident at the club's old training ground in July 2005, Bairns manager John Hughes asked Gowans' father, John, to lead out the team at Hampden Park.

== Match ==
=== Team news ===
Rangers were missing midfielder Kevin Thomson, who was ruled out until the following season after knee ligament damage sustained in November 2008, and defender Kirk Broadfoot due to a foot injury. There were fitness concerns over Pedro Mendes and Maurice Edu who were both suffering from thigh injuries.

Falkirk were without on-loan midfielder Arnau Riera due to a suspension he picked up in the semi-final against Dunfermline Athletic, he since returned to parent club Sunderland only to be released on 28 May 2009. Ex-Rangers players Steven Pressley and Neil McCann returned from suspension and injury respectively. Both players were missing from the final Scottish Premier League match of the season

=== Match details ===
30 May 2009
15:00

Rangers	1–0	Falkirk
Novo 46'	Report

Hampden Park, Glasgow
Attendance: 50,956
Referee: C Thomson

Rangers	Falkirk

RANGERS:
GK	25	(Scotland) Neil Alexander
RB	28	(Scotland) Steven Whittaker	(yellow card) 41'
CB	3	(Scotland) David Weir (c)
CB	24	(Algeria) Madjid Bougherra
LB	5	(Bosnia and Herzegovina) Saša Papac
RM	35	(Northern Ireland) Steven Davis
CM	6	(Scotland) Barry Ferguson
CM	12	(Scotland) Lee McCulloch
LM	27	(Northern Ireland) Kyle Lafferty		(substituted off) 88'
ST	9	(Scotland) Kris Boyd		(substituted off) 46'
ST	18	(Scotland) Kenny Miller		(substituted off) 85'
Substitutes:
GK	1	(Scotland) Allan McGregor
DF	72	(Scotland) Danny Wilson
DF	23	(Scotland) Christian Dailly	(yellow card) 88'	(substituted on) 88'
MF	14	(Scotland) Steven Naismith		(substituted on) 85'
ST	10	(Spain) Nacho Novo	(yellow card) 90+3'	(substituted on) 46'
Manager:
(Scotland) Walter Smith

FALKIRK :
GK	1	(Spain) Dani Mallo
RB	5	(Scotland) Jackie McNamara	(yellow card) 45'
CB	20	(Scotland) Darren Barr (c)	(yellow card) 74'
CB	14	(Netherlands) Gerard Aafjes
LB	33	(Scotland) Tam Scobbie
CM	47	(Scotland) Burton O'Brien
CM	6	(Scotland) Kevin McBride		(substituted off) 74'
CM	4	(Republic of Ireland) Patrick Cregg		(substituted off) 74'
CM	16	(Canada) Scott Arfield
ST	15	(England) Steve Lovell
ST	7	(Scotland) Neil McCann		(substituted off) 74'
Substitutes:
GK	17	(Austria) Bobby Olejnik
DF	10	(Scotland) Steven Pressley
MF	24	(Scotland) Mark Stewart		(substituted on) 74'
ST	21	(England) Carl Finnigan	(yellow card) 90+1'	(substituted on) 74'
ST	11	(England) Michael Higdon		(substituted on) 74'
Manager:
(Scotland) John Hughes

MATCH OFFICIALS

- Assistant referees:
  - Lawrence Kerrigan
  - Willie Dishington
- Fourth official: Steve Conroy

MATCH RULES

- 90 minutes
- 30 minutes of extra time if scores are level
- Penalty shootout if scores still level
- Five named substitutes
- Maximum of 3 substitutions

=== Statistics ===
Statistic	Rangers	Falkirk
Goals scored	1	0
Total shots	7	12
Shots on target	4	1
Ball possession	45%	55%
Fouls committed	16	10
Offsides	1	7
Yellow cards	3	3
Red cards	0	0

Source: BBC Sport, The Guardian

== Media coverage ==
In the UK the 2009 Scottish Cup Final was shown live on BBC One Scotland, Sky Sports 2 and Sky Sports HD2. In Australia it was shown live on Setanta Sports. A highlights package of the Scottish Cup final was shown on BBC One Scotland at 2200 BST on the day of the match.
