= 2010–11 Stirling Albion F.C. season =

Stirling Albion
2010–11 season
- Manager: John O'Neill; Jocky Scott
- Stadium: Forthbank Stadium
- Scottish First Division: 10th (Relegated)
- Challenge Cup: Second round
- League Cup: First round
- Scottish Cup: Third round
- Top goalscorer: League: stacy 1 All: brogan 0
- Highest home attendance: stacy
- Lowest home attendance: brogan 0

During Season 2010–11 Stirling Albion competed in the Scottish First Division, Challenge Cup, League Cup and the Scottish Cup.

== Summary ==
BROGANS BELLY First Division and were relegated to the Second Division. They reached the second round of the Challenge Cup, the first round of the League Cup and were eliminated in the third round of the Scottish Cup.

=== Management ===
They started season 2010–11 under the management of John O'Neill who had been appointed in the summer. On 19 January 2011, O'Neill was sacked by the club and the following day Jocky Scott was unveiled as the club's new manager.

== Results and fixtures ==
Win Draw Loss

=== Scottish First Division ===
7 August 2010 First Division	Greenock Morton	0–0	Stirling Albion	Cappielow Park
		BBC Report		Attendance: 2,375; Referee: Richmond

14 August 2010 First Division	Stirling Albion	1–3	Cowdenbeath	Forthbank Stadium
	Robertson 34'; Aitken (yellow card) 73' (red card)	SFL Report	Sibanda 61'; Brett 70'; Dempster 77'	Attendance: 820; Referee: Tumilty

21 August 2010 First Division	Falkirk	3–0	Stirling Albion	Falkirk Stadium
	Twaddle 60'; Stewart 70'; Compton 79'	BBC Report		Attendance: 4,196; Referee: McDonald

28 August 2010 First Division	Stirling Albion	1–5	Dunfermline Athletic	Forthbank Stadium
	Smith 34'	BBC Report	Bell 14'; Cardle 78'; Kirk 15', 88', 90'	Attendance: 1,370; Referee: Nicholls

11 September 2010 First Division	Partick Thistle	1–2	Stirling Albion	Firhill
	Doolan 50'	BBC Report	Gibson 54'; Smith 75'	Attendance: 1,994; Referee: Salmond

18 September 2010 First Division	Ross County	3–1	Stirling Albion	Victoria Park
	Wood 22', 50'; Morrison 38'	BBC Report	Smith 41'	Attendance: 2,125; Referee: Northcroft

25 September 2010 First Division	Stirling Albion	0–0	Queen of the South	Forthbank Stadium
		BBC Report		Attendance: 945; Referee: Watters

2 October 2010 First Division	Raith Rovers	0–2	Stirling Albion	Stark's Park
		BBC Report	Aitken 45' (Penalty); Smith 91'	Attendance: 2,010; Referee: Collum

16 October 2010 First Division	Stirling Albion	1–1	Dundee	Forthbank Stadium
	Forsyth 70'; Brown (red card) 84'	BBC Report	Griffiths 56'	Attendance: 1,578; Referee: Craig Thomson

23 October 2010 First Division	Stirling Albion	4–2	Partick Thistle	Forthbank Stadium
	Smith 2' (27); Aitken 30' (65)	BBC Report	Doolan 14' (78)	Attendance: 1,386; Referee: Allan

30 October 2010 First Division	Dunfermline Athletic	3–0	Stirling Albion	East End Park
	Gibson 18'; Kirk 30'; Woods 80'	BBC Report		Attendance: 3,025; Referee: McKendrick

6 November 2010 First Division	Cowdenbeath	5–1	Stirling Albion	Central Park
	Allison 19' (Own goal); Stewart 27'; Ramsay 53'; Fairbairn 73'; Miller 82'	SFL Report	Smith 9'; Allison (red card) 24'; Borris (red card) 71'	Attendance: 507; Referee: McDermott

13 November 2010 First Division	Stirling Albion	0–5	Falkirk	Forthbank Stadium
	Buist (red card)	BBC Report	Flynn 6'; Stewart 15' (57); Deuchar 71'; Finnigan 79'	Attendance: 2,168; Referee: Robertson

18 December 2010 First Division	Dundee	2–0	Stirling Albion	Dens Park
	O'Donnell 36'; Griffiths 46'	BBC Report		Attendance: 3,842; Referee: Watters

2 January 2011 First Division	Falkirk	4–2	Stirling Albion	Falkirk Stadium
	Higginbotham 5' (32); Allison 20' (Og.); McLean 60'	BBC Report	Witteveen 25'; Paul McHale 88'	Attendance: 3,722; Referee: Madden

15 January 2011 First Division	Partick Thistle	6–1	Stirling Albion	Firhill
	Doolan 23'; Flannigan 34'; Buchanan 50' (pen.), 67'; Fraser 74'; Campbell 82'	BBC Report	Aitken 90'	Attendance: 1,689; Referee: Finnie

5 February 2012 First Division	Stirling Albion	1–3	Raith Rovers	Forthbank Stadium
	Borris 39'	BBC Report	Tade 16', 53'; Walker 66'	Attendance: 1,193; Referee: Muir

12 February 2011 First Division	Ross County	0–0	Stirling Albion	Victoria Park
		BBC Report		Attendance: 2,114; Referee: Hilland

15 February 2012 First Division	Stirling Albion	0–1	Greenock Morton	Forthbank Stadium
		SFL Report	Graham 84'	Attendance: 626; Referee: McKendrick

19 February 2012 First Division	Stirling Albion	0–1	Dundee	Forthbank Stadium
		BBC Report	Higgins 35'; Irvine (red card) 64'	Attendance: 1,990; Referee: Winter

22 February 2011 First Division	Queen of the South	2–2	Stirling Albion	Palmerston Park
	McMenamin 50'; McGuffie 69'	BBC Report	Aitken 17'; Smith 87'	Attendance: 1,185; Referee: Murray

26 February 2011 First Division	Raith Rovers	2–1	Stirling Albion	Stark's Park
	Murray 35'; Baird 83'	BBC Report	Smith 53'	Attendance: 1,918; Referee: Conroy

1 March 2011 First Division	Stirling Albion	0–0	Ross County	Forthbank Stadium
		BBC Report	Flynn (yellow card) 80' (red card)	Attendance: 514; Referee: Charleston

5 March 2011 First Division	Stirling Albion	3–4	Cowdenbeath	Forthbank Stadium
	Welsh 40'; Mullen 58', 67'; Buist (yellow card) 81' (red card)	SFL Report	Ramsay 77', 82' (Penalty); Campbell 89'; Stewart 92'	Attendance: 735; Referee: Norris

15 March 2011 First Division	Stirling Albion	1–1	Dunfermline Athletic	Forthbank Stadium
	Borris 32'	BBC Report	Kirk 5'	Attendance: 944; Referee: Steve Conroy

19 March 2011 First Division	Dunfermline Athletic	4–1	Stirling Albion	East End Park
	Hardie 31' (pen.), 45' (pen.), 90'; Buchanan 55'	BBC Report	Kane 75'	Attendance: 2,553; Referee: Nicholls

22 March 2011 First Division	Stirling Albion	0–3	Partick Thistle	Forthbank Stadium
		BBC Report	Kris Doolan 27' (73), pen.' Balatoni 36'	Attendance: 651; Referee: Salmond

26 March 2011 First Division	Queen of the South	4–1	Stirling Albion	Palmerston Park
	McLaren 23' (Penalty), 36'; McMenamin 54', 76'	BBC Report	Smith	Attendance: 1,392; Referee: McKendrick

29 March 2011 First Division	Stirling Albion	0–2	Queen of the South	Forthbank Stadium
		BBC Report	Orsi 4'; Lilley 45+3'	Attendance: 444; Referee: Winter

2 April 2011 First Division	Stirling Albion	0–2	Ross County	Forthbank Stadium
		BBC Report	Vigurs 44'; Flynn 67'	Attendance: 461; Referee: Beaton

5 April 2011 First Division	Greenock Morton	2–0	Stirling Albion	Cappielow Park
	Forsyth 9' (Own goal); O'Brien 36'	SFL Report		Attendance: 980; Referee: Smith

10 April 2011 First Division	Dundee	1–1	Stirling Albion	Dens Park
	McIntosh 50'	BBC Report	Mullen 23'	Attendance: 4,177; Referee: Hilland

16 April 2011 First Division	Stirling Albion	1–2	Raith Rovers	Forthbank Stadium
	Flood 63'	BBC Report	Walker 15'; Baird 80'	Attendance: 1,162; Referee: McDermott

23 April 2011 First Division	Stirling Albion	1–2	Falkirk	Forthbank Stadium
	Smith 53'	BBC Report	Millar 37'; McManus 41'	Attendance: 1,288; Referee: O'Reilly

30 April 2011 First Division	Cowdenbeath	1–0	Stirling Albion	Central Park
	Crawford 79'	SFL Report		Attendance: 415; Referee: Murray

7 May 2011 First Division	Stirling Albion	3–2	Greenock Morton	Forthbank Stadium
	Stirling 42', 45+3'; Mullen 89'	BBC Report	Monti 28' (Penalty); McCaffrey 91'	Attendance: 701; Referee: Finnie

=== Scottish Challenge Cup ===
24 July 2010 Scottish Challenge Cup R1	Stirling Albion	0–0 (a.e.t.) (3–1 p)	Falkirk	Forthbank Stadium
		SFL Report		Attendance: 1,542; Referee: John McKendrick
	Penalties
	Devine (penalty scored); Colquhoun (penalty scored); Gibson (penalty missed); Buist (penalty missed); Forsyth (penalty scored)		Millar (penalty missed); Finnigan (penalty missed); O'Brien (penalty scored); Stewart (penalty missed)

10 August 2010 Scottish Challenge Cup R2	East Fife	3–1	Stirling Albion	Bayview Stadium
	Byrne 3'; Johnstone 50'; Cargill 90'	SFL Report	Devine 29'	Attendance: 512; Referee: Northcroft

=== Scottish League Cup ===
31 July 2010 Scottish League Cup R1	Stirling Albion	1–2	Forfar Athletic	Forthbank Stadium
	Taggart 65'	BBC Report	Campbell 16'; Campbell 51'	Attendance: 599; Referee: Conroy

=== Scottish Cup ===
20 November 2010 Scottish Scottish Cup R3	Stirling Albion	1–3	Partick Thistle	Forthbank Stadium
	Smith 73'	BBC Report	Cairney 59'; Donnelly 86'; Grehan 90'	Attendance: 1,146; Referee: Law

== League table ==
Pos	Team	Pld	W	D	L	GF	GA	GD	Pts	Promotion, qualification or relegation
6	Dundee	36	19	12	5	54	34	+20	44 (Note: Dundee were docked 25 points for entering administration. The deduction was temporarily lifted pending an appeal by the club, however the appeal failed and the deduction was reinstated.)	
7	Greenock Morton	36	11	10	15	39	43	−4	43	
8	Ross County	36	9	14	13	30	34	−4	41	
9	Cowdenbeath (R)	36	9	8	19	41	72	−31	35	Qualification for the First Division play-offs
10	Stirling Albion (R)	36	4	8	24	32	82	−50	20	Relegation to the Second Division

Source: SPFL
Rules for classification: 1) points; 2) goal difference; 3) number of goals scored.
(R) Relegated
