= Tam Scobbie =

Scottish footballer (born 1988)

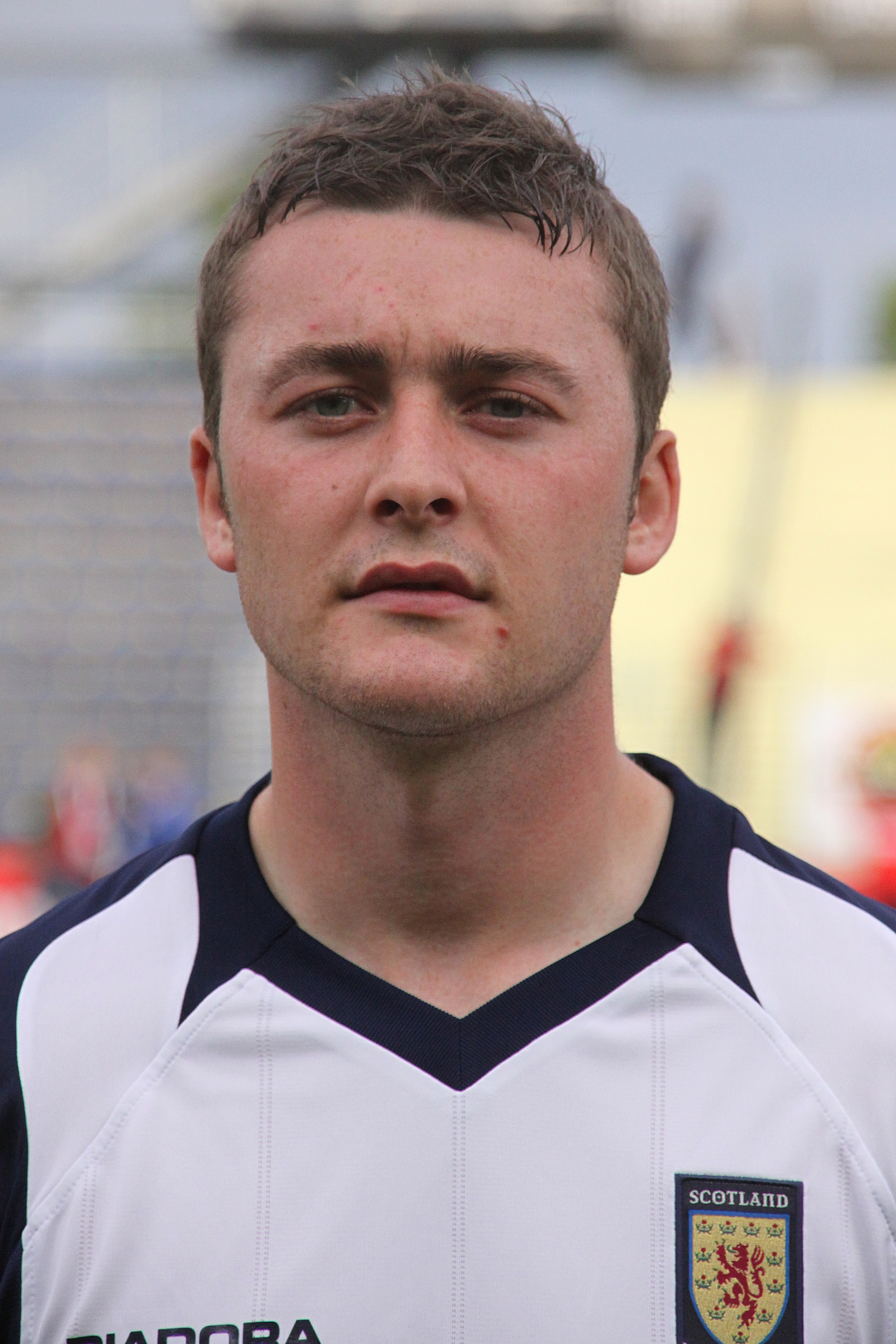
- Scobbie representing Scotland under-21s in 2009

Personal information
- Date of birth: 31 March 1988 (age 38)
- Place of birth: Falkirk, Scotland
- Position: Full back

Senior career*
Years	Team	Apps	(Gls)
2005–2012	Falkirk	160	(5)
2012–2017	St Johnstone	105	(2)
2017–2019	Dundee United	19	(0)
2018	→ Partick Thistle (loan)	7	(0)
2019	→ Brechin City (loan)	14	(0)
2019–2021	Kelty Hearts		
2021–2023	Berwick Rangers		

International career
2006–2007	Scotland U19	4	(0)
2007–2010	Scotland U21	12	(0)

Managerial career
- 2023–2025: Berwick Rangers
- 2025–: Camelon Juniors
- * Club domestic league appearances and goals

Thomas "Tam" Scobbie (born 31 March 1988) is a Scottish retired professional footballer who is currently the manager of East of Scotland Premier Division club Camelon Juniors.

In his playing career, Scobbie played for Falkirk, St Johnstone, Dundee United, Partick Thistle, Brechin City, and Kelty Hearts, before retiring at Berwick Rangers as a player/coach. Early in his career, Scobbie was also a regular squad member for the Scotland under-21 national team.

After retiring as a player, Tam was appointed manager of former club Berwick Rangers after Stuart Malcolm left for Arbroath in late October 2023. He left the club by mutual consent in early 2025.

== Personal life ==
Growing up in Westquarter, Falkirk, Scobbie played most of his football as a boy with Grangemouth Boys Club, whilst attending Graeme High School. An intelligent student, he mixed his studies well with football but left in fourth-year to pursue a career in the game. At age twelve, Scobbie joined Falkirk's academy team becoming the youngest player to sign a schoolboy form for the club.

After playing in the 2009 Scottish Cup final, Scobbie revealed that his grandfather died prior to the final. He has an older sister, Savanna.

== Club career ==
=== Falkirk ===
Having progressed through the Falkirk's youth system, Scobbie made his debut for the Bairns, coming on as an 81st-minute substitute, in a 1–0 loss against Hamilton Academical on 30 April 2005 with Falkirk having already won the league title and promotion to the Scottish Premier League. He had to wait for a year to make his top-flight football debut, starting the whole game, in a 2–0 win against Dundee United on 29 April 2006. He made two more appearances later in the 2005–06 season.

Scobbie made his first appearance of the 2006–07 season, starting the whole game, in a 2–1 win against Dundee United in the opening game of the season. He found himself alternating between the starting line–up and substitute bench throughout the season under John Hughes, who gave him his professional football debut. Scobbie commented about getting more playing time, saying: "I've had a fantastic start to the season, coming in at 18 years old and playing for my home team in almost every game." However, in a match against Motherwell on 10 February 2007, his poor pass led to Scott McDonald scoring an equaliser, as Falkirk went on to lose 2–1. After the match, manager Hughes defended his performance. In a follow–up match against Rangers, his performance did not improve when Scobbie received a red card for the first time in his career after he was caught in a late tackle with Chris Burke, as the Bairns went on to lose 2–1. After the match, manager Hughes thought Scobbie's tackle that led to a red card was "very soft". Following a two match suspension, he returned from suspension, coming on as a late substitute, in a 2–0 win against St Mirren on 31 March 2007. On 28 April 2007, Scobbie made amends from his mistakes two months ago against Motherwell when he scored his first goal for the club, in a 3–3 draw. At the end of the 2006–07 season, he went on to make twenty–three appearances and scoring once in all competitions.

In the opening game of the 2007–08 season, Scobbie made a good start for Falkirk when he provided an assist for Michael Higdon, in a 4–0 win against Gretna. However, in a match against Hearts on 6 October 2007, Scobbie was criticised during the match that saw the club lose 4–2 and was dropped for one match. But he regained his first team place and made improvements for the Bairns as the season progressed. As a result, on 26 February 2008, Scobbie signed a five-year contract with the club, keeping him until 2013. He helped Falkirk keep four consecutive clean sheets between 1 March 2008 and 29 March 2008. In a match against Hearts on 5 May 2008, Scobbie made amends from his mistakes earlier in the season when he scored his first goal for the club and then provided an assist for Carl Finnigan, in a 2–1 win. At the end of the 2007–08 season, Scobbie made thirty–five appearances and scoring once in all competitions.

However, at the start of the 2008–09 season, Scobbie was diagnosed with a pelvic injury that saw him out for two months. After returning to training, he appeared as an unused substitute, as Falkirk went on to lose 2–1 against Inverness Caledonian Thistle on 30 August 2008. In a follow–up match against Hearts, Scobbie returned to the starting line–up, in a 2–1 win. His return led to manager John Hughes commenting that his progression could see him being captain and could be a manager. However, his return was short–lived when he suffered an injury that kept him out for two months. On 27 December 2008, Scobbie made his return from injury, coming on as a 70th-minute substitute, in a 1–0 loss against Dundee United. However, his return was short lived once again when he suffered a hernia injury that kept him out for a month. Scobbie made his return from injury, starting the whole game, and helped Falkirk keep a clean sheet, in a 0–0 draw against Hibernian on 26 February 2009. In a follow–up match against Dundee United, he was at fault for giving away a penalty, which saw the opposition score the only goal of the season. Following his return from injury, he regained his first team place for the rest of the season. On 26 April 2009, Scobbie scored in a 2–0 win against Dunfermline Athletic in the Scottish Cup semi-final to help the Bairns reach the final. After the match, he said reaching the final was the moment that he never forget. A week later on 2 May 2009, Scobbie scored again, in a 2–1 win against Motherwell. In the final, Scobbie started the match, but was unable to help Falkirk overcome the deficit, as the club went on to lose 1–0 to Rangers in the 2009 Scottish Cup Final. Following the loss, Scobbie said the defeat left him "heartbroken". At the end of the 2008–09 season, he went on to make twenty–seven appearances and scoring once in all competitions.

Ahead of the 2009–10 season, Scobbie was among three players to be linked a move away from Falkirk, as he was keen to sit down with the club's board to discuss the fresh terms. Scobbie made his European debut for the Bairns in the second round qualifying round of the UEFA Europa League against FC Vaduz of Liechtenstein, but Falkirk lose 2–1 in a two-legged tie. The start of the 2009–10 season also saw him adjusting without manager, John Hughes, who left for Hibernian. However, in October, he sustained a recurrence of his pelvic problems, which caused him to be pulled out of Scotland's Under-21 squad. Scobbie revealed he had taken 12 injections and unsuccessfully had a hernia operations twice. In late January, he fully recovered from injuries. Scobbie returned on 13 February 2010 from his injury, starting the whole game, in a 3–2 loss against Hearts. Following his return from injury, he regained his first team place for the rest of the season. However, Scobbie was unable to help the club survive relegation on the last game of the season and was relegated to Division One. At the end of the 2009–10 season, he went on to make twenty–three appearances in all competitions.

At the start of the 2010–11 season, with many key players left Falkirk, Scobbie stayed at the Barins, reflecting: "There was talk of some financial difficulties and the club having to move some players on. I had a few options to leave, but I didn't want to leave on those terms, I didn't want to be remembered for leaving after we got relegated." He continued to be a first team regular for Falkirk throughout the season. On 15 February 2011, Scobbie scored his first goal of the season, in a 1–1 draw against Dunfermline Athletic. However, he failed to help the Bairns promoted back to the Scottish Premier League. At the end of the 2010–11 season, Scobbie went on to make thirty-six appearances and scoring once in all competitions. Following this, he was linked a move return Scottish Premier League, with the clubs like Kilmarnock and St Mirren interested in signing him.

The start of the 2011–12 season saw Scobbie set up the winning goal for Kallum Higginbotham, in a 2–1 win against Partick Thistle. He also found role reversed by guiding a new generation of Falkirk's young talent to break into the first team, such as, Murray Wallace, Jay Fulton, Craig Sibbald, Rhys Bennett and Stephen Kingsley. However, Scobbie suffered an injury and was substituted in the 58th minute, as Falkirk drew 2–2 on 22 October 2011. But he returned to the starting line–up, in a 3–1 loss against Ross County on 12 November 2011. Following this, Scobbie regained his first team place for the rest of the season. In the Scottish Challenge Cup final against Hamilton Academical, he started in the final and helped the Bairns win to win the Challenge Cup, earning his first trophy in his professional football career. In May 2012, Scobbie announced he is to leave the club this summer and said that his departure was "inevitable". After missing two matches due to an injury, Scobbie returned to the starting line–up against Ayr United in the last game of the season and scored the opening goal from the penalty, as Falkirk won 3–2, in what turned out to be his last appearance for the Bairns. At the end of the 2011–12 season, he went on to make forty–one appearances and scoring once in all competitions.

=== St Johnstone ===
Scobbie left Falkirk under freedom of contract in May 2012 and returned to the Scottish top–flight football by signing a two-year contract with St Johnstone. Upon joining the Saints, he said: "I'm glad to get the opportunity to come here. The manager didn't have to do a sales pitch on the club. Obviously European football was a major factor but Saints had a very good season and they have a good reputation in the game. Hopefully we can kick on next season."

However at the start of the 2012–13 season, he appeared as an unused substitute in both legs of the UEFA Europa League second qualifying round against Turkish side Eskişehirspor, as the club went on to lose 4–1 on aggregate and was eliminated in the tournament. Scobbie made his debut for the club, starting the whole game, in a 2–1 loss against Aberdeen on 18 August 2012. However, Scobbie was unable to regain his first team place at St Johnstone, due to facing competitions from Dave Mackay and Callum Davidson. Despite this, he did make number of appearances in the first team, due to St Johnstone's injury crisis. After dropped from the starting eleven for two matches by late–March, Scobbie made his return to the starting line–up, in a 1–1 draw against Dundee United on 1 April 2013. He was featured in the remaining six matches of the season and contributed to the Saints' third place finish and qualification to Europe again after beating Motherwell 2–0. During that moment, Scobbie began playing more in the centre–back position under the management of Steve Lomas. At the end of the 2012–13 season, he made twenty–one appearances in all competitions.

At the start of the 2013–14 season, Scobbie played in both legs of in the second round of the UEFA Europa League against Norwegian side Rosenberg, as St Johnstone won 2–1 on aggregate. However, he played in both legs of in the UEFA Europa League third qualifying round against Minsk, as the Saints was eliminated on penalties following a 1–1 draw. Following this, Scobbie helped St Johnstone keep three consecutive clean sheets in the first three league matches. After being dropped to the substitute bench for three matches between 21 September 2013 and 5 October 2013, Scobbie returned to the first team, coming on as a 77th-minute substitute, in a 4–3 loss against St Mirren on 19 October 2013. Following his return to the starting line–up, he began to play either the centre–back position or left–back position. On 14 January 2014, Scobbie signed a contract extension with the Saints, keeping him until 2015. A week later on 18 January 2014 against Hearts, he was forced to play in goal for the final three minutes, after Alan Mannus had been sent off with no substitutions remaining, and conceded a goal when Danny Wilson headed pass him, as the match ended in a 3–3 draw. However, during the match, Scobbie was involved in the incident for headbutting Brad McKay. This led the Scottish Football Association issued a notice on Scobbie and was considering banning him for two games. He ended up serving a two match ban after the club decided against appealing for his ban. After serving a two match suspension, Scobbie returned to the starting line–up, in a 3–0 loss against Celtic on 16 February 2014. In a follow–up match against Inverness Caledonian Thistle, he came on as a 37th-minute substitute for Frazer Wright and played the rest of the match despite sustaining a ligament damage along the way, as St Johnstone went on to lose 1–0. After an operation, it was announced that Scobbie would be out for the remainder of the season. Despite this, he was part of the successful side that went on to win Scottish Cup Final. At the end of the 2013–14 season, Scobbie went on to make twenty–seven appearances in all competitions.

At the start of the 2014–15 season, Scobbie played in both legs of the UEFA Europa League second qualifying round against Luzern as a late substitute, and played a vital role when he converted the winning penalty shoot-out, putting the Saints through to the next round. After sitting out in the first leg of the UEFA Europa League second qualifying round against Spartak Trnava, Scobbie returned to the starting line–up in the return leg, as he was unable to help the club overcome the deficit in a 1–1, resulting in their elimination from the tournament. Following this, Scobbie started in the first five league matches of the season. However, he suffered a medial ligament damage during training that requires repairment, resulting him out for three months. By late December, Scobbie made a full recovery from his injury and appeared two matches as an unused substitute in early January. He returned on 17 January 2015, coming on as an 82nd-minute substitute for Brian Easton, in a 2–0 win over Partick Thistle on 17 January 2015. Following his return from injury, Scobbie regained his first team place, playing in either the centre–back position or left–back position, though at times, he was dropped to the substitute bench, due to "tactical reasons". Despite this, on 13 April 2015, Scobbie signed a new two-year contract with St Johnstone, keeping him at the club until 2017. He played a role by setting up on 25 April 2015 and 2 May 2015 against Dundee and Inverness Caledonian Thistle respectively. On the last game of the season, Scobbie started the whole game to help St Johnstone beat Aberdeen 1–0 to help the Saints qualify for the UEFA Europa League for the third year running. At the end of the 2014–15 season, Scobbie made twenty–five appearances in all competitions. For his performance, he was awarded the Highland Saints' Magic Moment of the Season at the club's award ceremony.

Ahead of the 2015–16 season, Scobbie said he couldn't be more excited to play in Europe once again prior to the match against FC Alashkert in the first qualifying round of the UEFA Europa League. Scobbie started in the first leg of the first qualifying round of the UEFA Europa League against FC Alashkert, as St Johnstone lose 1–0. Prior to the match, he said the Saints must improved on their result in the return leg. However, his words didn't help as Scobbie was unable to help the club overturn the deficit, due to losing on away goal despite winning in the return leg. Following this, he remained in the first team, playing in either the centre–back position or left–back position. However, at times, Scobbie was placed on the substitute bench, due to having a difficult start to the season, as well as, his own injury. He then scored his first goal of the season, in a 4–3 loss against Aberdeen on 6 February 2016. Two weeks later on 20 February 2016, Scobbie scored his second goal of the season, scoring from a header at last minute, in a 2–1 win against Motherwell. After the match, he said scoring the winning goal showed his redemption, due to St Johnstone's bad form. At the end of the 2015–16 season, Scobbie made thirty–five appearances and scoring two times in all competitions.

At the start of the 2016–17 season, Scobbie made five starts, including four of them in the Scottish League Cup. However, during a 3–2 win against Hearts in the Scottish League Cup, he suffered a knee injury and was substituted at half–time. After the match, Scobbie was out for three months. After returning to the substitute bench in mid–November, he returned to the first team, coming on as a second–half substitute, in a 4–2 loss against Ross County on 19 November 2016. Following his return from injury, Scobbie found himself alternating between the starting eleven and substitute bench. By March, he made six consecutive starts for St Johnstone following the absence of Steven Anderson. Despite this, his contributions saw the Saints qualify for the UEFA Europa League next season. At the end of the 2016–17 season, Scobbie made twenty appearances in all competitions.

After leaving St Johnstone, Scobbie was critical of the club's chairman Steve Brown for forcing him out of the Saints, and feeling "undervalued" when he offered him a new contract with a 35% wage cut. In response, Steve Brown criticised Scobbie's comment, pointing out that "he only started 18 out of 46 competitive games last season and over the course of his five seasons with us, he was in the starting line-up in less than half of the games." Brown also stated that his actions to release Scobbie was "a financially prudent for St Johnstone".

=== Dundee United ===
After leaving St Johnstone Scobbie signed for Scottish Championship club Dundee United on 13 June 2017.

He made his debut for the club, starting the whole game as captain, in a 2–0 win against Raith Rovers in the Scottish League Cup. Scobbie made three more starts for Dundee United. However, just six games into the new campaign, he suffered a torn groin muscle in a League Cup tie with Dundee and substituted in the 18th minute, as the club went on to lose 2–1. As a result, this saw him ruled out of action for nearly two months. Scobbie returned on 28 October 2017 from his injury, starting the whole game, in a 2–0 win against Dumbarton. Just three matches to his return from suspension, he received a red card for a second bookable offence at the last minute, in a 1–1 draw against Brechin City on 25 November 2017. After serving a one match suspension, he returned to the first team regularly at full-back and the centre of defence for the club despite being out on two separate occasions. Following Dundee United's 6–1 loss against Falkirk on 6 January 2018, Scobbie apologised for his rant after he made a rant about the club's defeat. Having been described a key player to Dundee United's chance of promotion to the top–flight football, he helped the club qualify for a Play-off spot. However, Scobbie did not play in the play–offs, as Dundee United were unsuccessful to reach promotion to the Scottish Premiership after losing against Livingston 4–3 on aggregate. At the end of the 2017–18 season, he made twenty–four appearances in all competitions.

In the 2018–19 season, Scobbie was told by Dundee United that he could leave the club. Following his loan spells at Brechin City came to an end, he was released by the club at the end of the 2018–19 season.

==== Loan spells from Dundee United ====
Scobbie joined Partick Thistle on loan on Deadline Day, being given the number 37 kit. He made his debut for the club, starting the whole game, in a 2–1 loss against East Fife on 8 September 2018. However, Scobbie suffered an injury that saw him out for a month. He returned on 17 November 2018 from his injury, coming on as a 65th-minute substitute, in a 1–1 draw against Falkirk. By December, Scobbie made five starts for Partick Thistle. On 14 January 2019, he returned to Dundee United after making 8 appearances for Thistle.

Scobbie then joined Brechin City on loan on deadline day in January 2019, for the rest of the 2018–19 season. He made his debut for the club, starting the whole game, in a 1–0 win against Airdrieonians on 16 February 2019. Since joining Brechin City, Scobbie became a first team regular, playing in the left–back position. He also helped the club by assisting five times. At the end of the 2018–19 season, Scobbie made fourteen appearances in all competitions and returned to his parent club.

=== Kelty Hearts ===
Scobbie signed for Lowland League club Kelty Hearts on 13 September 2019.

He made his debut for the club, starting the whole game, in a 3–0 win against Gala Fairydean Rovers. Scobbie then scored his first goal for Kelty Hearts, in a 4–1 win against Caledonian Braves on 1 February 2020. He became a first team regular for the club before the season was curtailed because of the COVID-19 pandemic. A points per game formula was subsequently used to determine the final standings, with Kelty Hearts declared champions on 13 April 2020.

However, the 2020–21 season was suspended by the Scottish Football Association due to the escalating pandemic situation. On 30 March 2021, the league announced that a majority of clubs had voted to curtail the season, with a points per game basis used to finalise standings and Kelty Hearts were declared as the champions. Scobbie did not play in the Pyramid play-off against the winners of the 2020–21 Highland Football League Brora Rangers and Brechin City, as Kelty Hearts won the League Two play-off final to gain a place in Scottish League Two. Following this, he left the club at the end of the 2020–21 season.

=== Berwick Rangers ===
Berwick Rangers announced the signing of Scobbie on a short term deal on 30 August 2021.

On the same day, he made his debut for the club, starting the whole game, in a 1–0 loss against Bo'ness United. However, Scobbie suffered an injury that saw him have little playing time. Despite this, he signed a contract with Berwick Rangers for the rest of the 2021–22 season. At the end of the season, making fifteen appearances, Scobbie signed a contract extension with the club.

It was revealed that Scobbie moved to join Stuart Malcolm's backroom staff as a coach while remaining registered as a player for the 2022–23 season.

== Managerial career ==
=== Berwick Rangers ===
Having retired from professional football earlier in 2023, Scobbie was appointed as the new manager of Berwick Rangers on 24 October 2023. His first match as a manager came on 30 October 2023, in a 3–2 win against Camelon Juniors in the Quarter Final of the East of Scotland Qualifying Cup. At the end of the 2023–24 season, Berwick Rangers finished twelfth place in the league. Reflecting on his first season as a manager of the club, Scobbie said: "I've thoroughly enjoyed the first six or seven months in management. Hopefully it continues positively next season, and we can really go and have a competitive team."

The start of the 2024–25 season saw Berwick Rangers go on a four-match unbeaten in the league. However, the club's form soon took a dip when they went on as a six match winless from mid–October to early–November. Following a poor run of results, Scobbie departed Berwick by mutual consent in January 2025.

=== Camelon Juniors ===
In March 2025, Scobbie was appointed manager of East of Scotland Premier Division side Camelon Juniors. Under Scobbie's management, the club reached the fourth round of the 2025–26 Scottish Cup, having knocked out Scottish League Two side Edinburgh City in the third round.

== International career ==
In September 2006, Scobbie was called up to represent Scotland U19 team. He made his debut for the U19 side, starting the game, in a 6–0 win against Bosnia and Herzegovina on 5 October 2006.

In August 2007, Scobbie was called up to the Scotland U21 squad for the first time. He made his debut for the U21 side, coming on as a late substitute, in a 3–2 loss against Finland U21 on 7 September 2007. Scobbie had to wait until February 2008 to make another appearance for Scotland U21, as the U21 side went on to lose 2–1 against Portugal U21. He had to wait for a year to make another appearance for Scotland U21, beating Albania U21 on 28 March 2009. Scobbie went on to make twelve appearances for the under–21 side.

In February 2008, Scobbie stated that he hoped he makes it to the senior team under the new management of George Burley. Scobbie was called up to the senior squad for the provisional squad on two separate occasions but he failed to make the cut.

== Career statistics ==
As of match played 4 November 2017

Appearances and goals by club, season and competition
Club	Season	League			Scottish Cup		League Cup		Other		Total	
Club	Season	Division	Apps	Goals	Apps	Goals	Apps	Goals	Apps	Goals	Apps	Goals
Falkirk	2004–05	First Division	1	0	0	0	0	0	0	0	1	0
Falkirk	2005–06	Scottish Premier League	3	0	0	0	0	0	0	0	3	1
Falkirk	2006–07	Scottish Premier League	21	1	0	0	2	0	0	0	23	1
Falkirk	2007–08	Scottish Premier League	33	1	1	0	1	0	0	0	35	1
Falkirk	2008–09	Scottish Premier League	20	1	4	1	3	0	0	0	27	2
Falkirk	2009–10	Scottish Premier League	20	0	0	0	1	0	2 (Note: Appearances in the Europa League)	0	23	0
Falkirk	2010–11	First Division	32	1	1	0	2	0	1 (Note: Appearances in the Scottish Challenge Cup)	0	36	1
Falkirk	2011–12	First Division	30	1	2	0	4	0	5	0	41	1
Falkirk	Total		160	5	8	1	13	0	8	0	189	6
St Johnstone	2012–13	Scottish Premier League	18	0	2	0	1	0	0	0	21	0
St Johnstone	2013–14	Scottish Premiership	21	0	1	0	1	0	4	0	27	0
St Johnstone	2014–15	Scottish Premiership	20	0	1	0	1	0	3	0	25	0
St Johnstone	2015–16	Scottish Premiership	30	2	0	0	3	0	2	0	35	2
St Johnstone	2016–17	Scottish Premiership	16	0	0	0	4	0	0	0	20	0
St Johnstone	Total		105	2	4	0	10	0	9	0	128	2
Dundee United	2017–18	Scottish Championship	19	0	0	0	5	0	0	0	24	0
Partick Thistle (loan)	2018–19	Scottish Championship	7	0	0	0	1	0	0	0	8	0
Brechin City (loan)	2018–19	Scottish League One	14	0	0	0	0	0	0	0	14	0
Career total			305	7	12	1	28	0	17	0	363	8

== Honours ==
Falkirk

- Scottish Challenge Cup: 2011–12
- Scottish Cup: runner-up 2008–09

St Johnstone

- Scottish Cup: 2013–14

Kelty Hearts

- Lowland League: 2019–20 and 2020–21
