= Steve Lovell =

English footballer (born 1980)

Personal information
- Full name: Stephen William Henry Lovell
- Date of birth: 6 December 1980 (age 45)
- Place of birth: Amersham, England
- Position: Striker

Senior career*
| Years | Team | Apps | (Gls) |
| 1998–1999 | AFC Bournemouth | 7 | (0) |
| 1999–2002 | Portsmouth | 32 | (3) |
| 2000 | → Exeter City (loan) | 5 | (1) |
| 2002 | → Sheffield United (loan) | 5 | (1) |
| 2002 | → Queens Park Rangers (loan) | 0 | (0) |
| 2002–2005 | Dundee | 82 | (28) |
| 2005–2008 | Aberdeen | 76 | (20) |
| 2008–2009 | Falkirk | 28 | (8) |
| 2009–2010 | Partick Thistle | 16 | (3) |
| 2010–2011 | AFC Bournemouth | 9 | (1) |
| Total | | 260 | (65) |
- * Club domestic league appearances and goals

Stephen William Henry Lovell (born 6 December 1980) is an English former footballer who played as a striker. Lovell played the majority of his career in the Scottish Premier League, representing Dundee, Aberdeen and Falkirk, but also played in England for AFC Bournemouth, Portsmouth, Exeter City, Sheffield United and Queens Park Rangers. During his senior career Lovell made 261 appearances and scored 65 goals. He retired from professional football following an injury in 2011.

== Career ==
=== Portsmouth ===
Lovell started his career in 1998 when he joined AFC Bournemouth, but then surprisingly signed for Portsmouth for £250,000 despite only making a few brief appearances. He then went on loan to Exeter City, Sheffield United (where he scored once against Watford) and Queens Park Rangers.

=== Dundee ===
Lovell signed for Scottish Premier League club Dundee in the summer of 2002. He spent three seasons at Dens Park, scoring 35 goals in 98 competitive appearances.

=== Aberdeen ===
In the summer of 2005, following Dundee's relegation from the SPL, Lovell signed for Aberdeen. He made his Aberdeen début against Kilmarnock on 8 August and scored his first goal against Rangers the following week. Lovell went on to score a further nine times that season. Lovell formed the habit of scoring late goals for Aberdeen, becoming something of a "supersub". These late goals included two in separate matches against Inverness Caledonian Thistle, which maintained Aberdeen's unbeaten record against that opponent. Lovell also scored a consolation goal in the second leg of Aberdeen's UEFA Cup match against Bayern Munich in the Allianz Arena.

In April 2008, he was told by Jimmy Calderwood that he would not be offered a new contract by Aberdeen and would be free to leave in the summer. It was reported on 18 July that Hibernian, Kilmarnock and Falkirk were all interested in signing him.

=== Falkirk ===
In August 2008, Lovell signed for Falkirk on a one-year deal with the option of a further one. He scored his first goal in a League Cup match against Queen of the South and netted his first league goal against Hamilton Academical the following Saturday. Despite a disappointing season for Falkirk in the league, Lovell ended up with a Scottish Cup runners-up medal, after playing the full match in the final against Rangers. In May 2009, it was reported that Lovell had undertaken a medical at Tannadice Park ahead of a proposed move to Dundee United, although United manager Craig Levein later refuted the story and Lovell admitted he knew "absolutely nothing about it". On 27 June 2009, he left Falkirk despite finishing the season as their top league goal scorer after new manager Eddie May refused to renew his contract. Lovell attempted to sue the club the following year for compensation as he claimed he had been entitled to a contract extension.

=== Partick Thistle ===
After leaving Falkirk, Lovell signed for Partick Thistle where he played seventeen games, scoring 3 goals, before leaving on 24 March 2010 to have surgery on a niggling ankle injury.

=== AFC Bournemouth ===
In June 2010, Lovell joined his half-brother, Eddie Howe at Bournemouth, his second spell at the club. After spending a period of pre-season with the club in 2009 he finally signed following the lifting of the club's transfer embargo. Lovell's contract came to an end after the 2010–11 campaign, but was offered a further year plus one-year option by Cherries boss, Lee Bradbury, and put pen to paper on 25 May 2011 keeping him at Bournemouth until at least May 2012. Lovell had struggled to overcome an ankle injury and only returned to the squad in April 2011 but showed enough quality to merit a new deal. On 1 September 2011, Lovell announced his retirement from professional football with immediate effect after struggling with injuries for the past two seasons. Lovell scored four goals during his second spell at Bournemouth. His first goal came against Hartlepool in the league, a game in which Bournemouth confirmed their spot in the 2010–11 playoffs despite conceding an injury time goal scored by Hartlepool goalkeeper Scott Flinders. However, his two goals against Huddersfield in the play off semi final second leg were unable to prevent them from losing on penalties. At the start of the following season, Lovell scored a goal against West Bromwich Albion in the League Cup as they lost 4–1. On 2 September 2011 Lovell retired from football because of injury.

== Personal life ==
In 2008, Lovell became engaged to Scottish singer-songwriter Amy Macdonald but the two separated four years later.

He is the half brother of Eddie Howe.

== Career statistics ==
=== Club ===
Appearances and goals by club, season and competition
| Club | Season | League | | | National Cup | | League Cup | | Europe | | Other | | Total | |
| Club | Season | Division | Apps | Goals | Apps | Goals | Apps | Goals | Apps | Goals | Apps | Goals | Apps | Goals |
|---|---|---|---|---|---|---|---|---|---|---|---|---|---|---|
| AFC Bournemouth | 1998–99 | Second Division | 7 | 0 | 0 | 0 | 0 | 0 | — | | — | | 7 | 0 |
| AFC Bournemouth | 1999–2000 | Second Division | 1 | 0 | 0 | 0 | 0 | 0 | — | | — | | 1 | 0 |
| AFC Bournemouth | Total | | 8 | 0 | 0 | 0 | 0 | 0 | 0 | 0 | 0 | 0 | 8 | 0 |
| Portsmouth | 1999–2000 | First Division | 3 | 0 | 0 | 0 | 3 | 1 | — | | — | | 6 | 1 |
| Portsmouth | 2000–01 | First Division | 9 | 1 | 0 | 0 | 0 | 0 | — | | — | | 9 | 1 |
| Portsmouth | 2001–02 | First Division | 20 | 2 | 1 | 0 | 0 | 0 | — | | — | | 21 | 2 |
| Portsmouth | 2002–03 | First Division | 0 | 0 | 0 | 0 | 0 | 0 | — | | — | | 0 | 0 |
| Portsmouth | Total | | 32 | 3 | 1 | 0 | 3 | 1 | 0 | 0 | 0 | 0 | 36 | 4 |
| Exeter City (loan) | 1999–2000 | Third Division | 5 | 1 | 0 | 0 | 0 | 0 | — | | — | | 5 | 1 |
| Sheffield United (loan) | 2001–02 | First Division | 5 | 1 | 0 | 0 | 0 | 0 | — | | — | | 5 | 1 |
| Queens Park Rangers (loan) | 2002–03 | Second Division | 0 | 0 | 0 | 0 | 0 | 0 | — | | — | | 0 | 0 |
| Dundee | 2002–03 | Scottish Premier League | 28 | 12 | 5 | 3 | 2 | 0 | 0 | 0 | — | | 35 | 15 |
| Dundee | 2003–04 | Scottish Premier League | 21 | 5 | 1 | 0 | 2 | 0 | 3 | 1 | — | | 27 | 6 |
| Dundee | 2004–05 | Scottish Premier League | 33 | 11 | 1 | 0 | 2 | 3 | 0 | 0 | — | | 36 | 14 |
| Dundee | Total | | 82 | 28 | 7 | 3 | 6 | 3 | 3 | 1 | 0 | 0 | 98 | 35 |
| Aberdeen | 2005–06 | Scottish Premier League | 27 | 8 | 1 | 0 | 1 | 1 | 0 | 0 | — | | 29 | 9 |
| Aberdeen | 2006–07 | Scottish Premier League | 27 | 9 | 2 | 0 | 0 | 0 | 0 | 0 | — | | 29 | 9 |
| Aberdeen | 2007–08 | Scottish Premier League | 22 | 3 | 3 | 1 | 0 | 0 | 5 | 1 | — | | 30 | 5 |
| Aberdeen | Total | | 76 | 20 | 6 | 1 | 1 | 1 | 5 | 1 | 0 | 0 | 88 | 23 |
| Falkirk | 2008–09 | Scottish Premier League | 28 | 8 | 3 | 1 | 2 | 1 | 0 | 0 | — | | 33 | 10 |
| Partick Thistle | 2009–10 | Scottish First Division | 16 | 3 | 1 | 0 | 0 | 0 | — | | — | | 17 | 3 |
| AFC Bournemouth | 2010–11 | League One | 7 | 1 | 0 | 0 | 0 | 0 | — | | — | | 7 | 1 |
| AFC Bournemouth | 2011–12 | League One | 2 | 0 | 0 | 0 | 1 | 1 | — | | 1 | 0 | 4 | 1 |
| AFC Bournemouth | Total | | 9 | 1 | 0 | 0 | 1 | 1 | 0 | 0 | 1 | 0 | 11 | 2 |
| Career total | | | 261 | 65 | 18 | 5 | 13 | 7 | 8 | 2 | 1 | 0 | 301 | 79 |
