= Darren Barr =

Scottish footballer (born 1985)

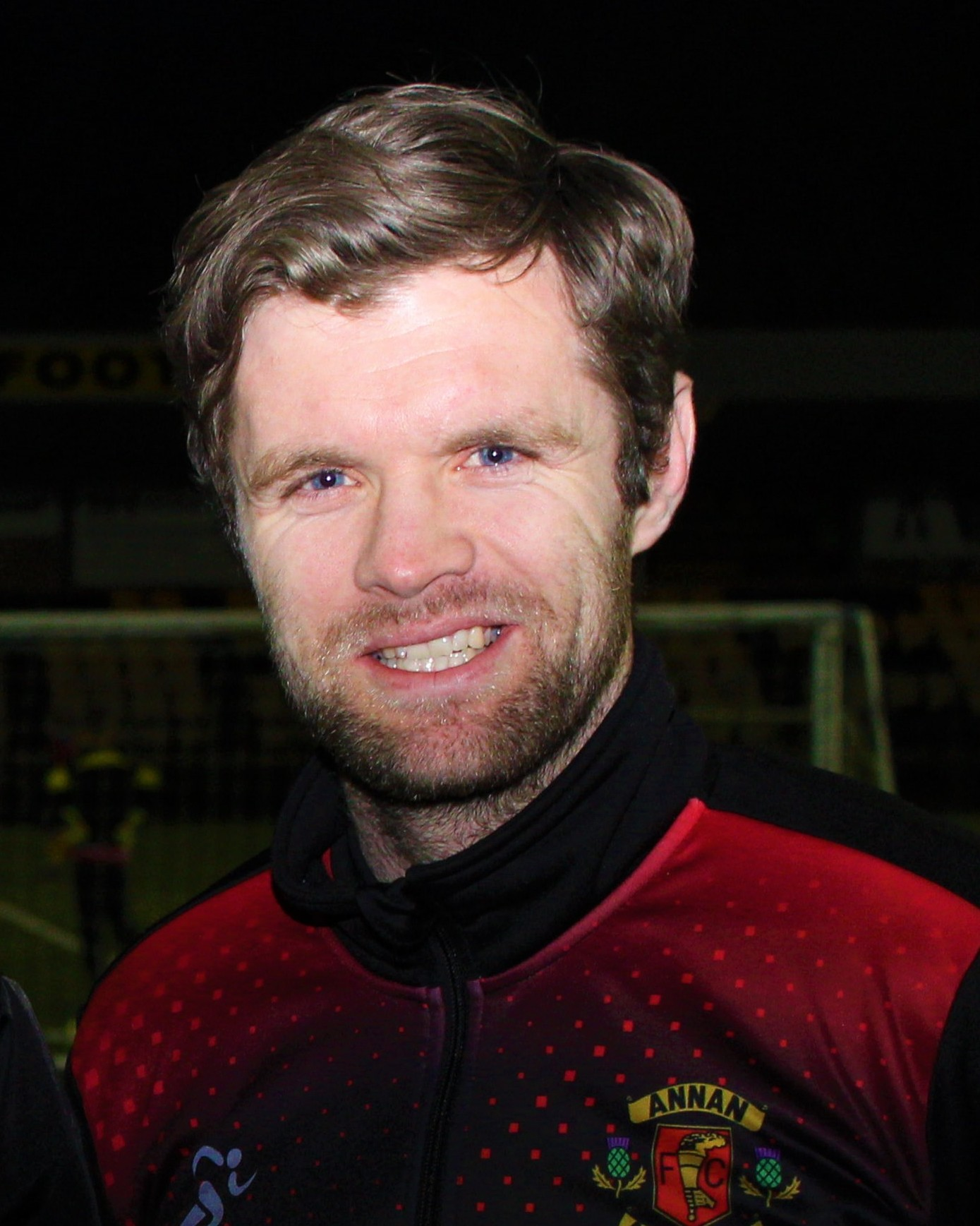
- Darren at Annan Athletic as player and assistant manager

Personal information
- Date of birth: 17 March 1985 (age 41)
- Place of birth: Glasgow, Scotland
- Height: 5 ft 11 in (1.80 m)
- Positions: Defensive midfielder; defender

Team information
- Current team: East Fife (Assistant Manager)

Youth career
- Westfield Boys Club
- Moodiesburn Boys Club
- 2002–2005: Falkirk

Senior career*
Years	Team	Apps	(Gls)
2004–2010	Falkirk	146	(5)
2005	→ Forfar Athletic (loan)	15	(0)
2010–2013	Heart of Midlothian	60	(1)
2013–2014	Kilmarnock	12	(1)
2014–2015	Ross County	6	(0)
2015–2017	Dumbarton	63	(3)
2017–2018	Greenock Morton	2	(0)
2018	Stirling Albion	18	(0)
2018–2020	Annan Athletic	16	(0)
Total		338	(10)

International career
2007	Scotland B	1	(0)
2008	Scotland	1	(0)

Managerial career
- 2017–2018: Greenock Morton (u20s)
- 2018: Stirling Albion (caretaker manager)
- 2018–2021: Annan Athletic (assistant)
- 2026-: East Fife (assistant)
- * Club domestic league appearances and goals

Darren Barr (born 17 March 1985) is a Scottish football coach and former player, whose most recent position was assistant manager at Scottish League Two club Annan Athletic now recently appointed assistant manager at East Fife.

Barr played for Falkirk, Heart of Midlothian, Forfar Athletic, Kilmarnock, Ross County, Dumbarton, Greenock Morton and Stirling Albion, mainly as a defender. He represented Scotland as a B and full international, being capped once in 2008. After leaving Falkirk in 2010, his career was hampered by several serious injuries.

== Early years ==
Barr enrolled at St. Michael's Primary School in his home community of Moodiesburn in 1990, and from 1997 attended St. Maurice's High School in Cumbernauld. He was a keen footballer during his school years, playing for Westfield Boys Club and later the Moodiesburn equivalent.

== Club career ==
=== Falkirk ===
Barr went on to sign for Falkirk on 12 July 2002, and after suffering a first anterior cruciate ligament injury during his apprenticeship, he made his first team debut on 13 March 2004, as a substitute against Queen of the South. He made two more appearances the next season before being loaned out to Forfar Athletic at the start of the 2005–06 season, making his debut on 27 August against Peterhead as an 81st-minute substitute. His loan lasted until 31 December 2005. In all he made fifteen appearances for Forfar.

Barr broke through to the Falkirk first team at the start of the 2006–07 season scoring his first goal for the club on 5 August 2006, in a victory over Dunfermline. In December 2006, he was named as SPL Young Player of the Month for December. Barr received his first ever red card on 20 January 2007, for squaring up to Hearts' Andrius Velicka, but the decision was overturned on appeal and Barr was instead credited with a yellow card. The following season Barr was sent off twice: first against Hibernian, being given a second yellow card for throwing the ball away and then against Celtic for receiving a second yellow card.

Barr was made Falkirk's captain at the age of 22 in January 2008, and went on to win the SPL Player of the Month award for March 2008.

Under new boss Eddie May, Barr began playing at right back during the 2009–10 season rather than his more normal centre back role. With his contract due to expire at the end of the season, May confirmed in January that Hibs had made two attempts to sign Barr along with Aberdeen. Barr choose to sign for Heart of Midlothian, on a pre-contract in January rather than leave Falkirk immediately opting to help them escape relegation. Falkirk failed to avoid relegation and Barr left on a low note expressing hope that Falkirk would gain promotion quickly.

=== Heart of Midlothian ===
On 25 January 2010, it was announced that Barr had signed a three-year pre-contract with Heart of Midlothian and would complete his move to Edinburgh upon the expiration of his contract with Falkirk at the end of the season. He was officially presented as a Hearts player at a press conference at Tynecastle on 8 June 2010. He made his debut on the opening day of the season against St Johnstone. Barr initially became a regular in the Hearts team at the start of the season but a loss of form and impressive displays by Craig Thomson saw Barr dropped from the team. Injury further limited his appearances, and he only made 14 appearances that season.

Barr's first appearance of the new season came in the League Cup against Ayr United on 21 September 2011. A recurrence of his hernia injury that required surgery caused further setbacks, and his next appearance came as a substitute against Motherwell in the league on Christmas Eve. Barr was consistently selected in midfield by manager Paulo Sergio in the last few months of the 2011–12 season ahead of established midfield players. In the 2012 Scottish Cup Final, Barr started the match in central midfield and scored the opening goal in a 5–1 win against Hibernian. His only league goal for Hearts also came against Hibernian, in his final appearance for the club at the end of 2012–13; he left when his contract expired at the end of that season.

=== Kilmarnock ===
On 17 July 2013, Barr signed a one-year deal with Kilmarnock. He scored his first goal for the club in a league match against Inverness Caledonian Thistle, and his second followed in a Scottish Cup defeat to Dundee United. The cup loss to Dundee United proved to be his final game for the club as he was ruled out for several months with a hip injury shortly afterwards. He was not offered a new contract and left the club after the end of the 2013–14 season.

=== Ross County ===
After leaving Kilmarnock, Barr went on trial with Scottish Premiership side Partick Thistle in July 2014 and also played as a trialist in pre-season for Motherwell. On 1 September 2014, Barr signed for Ross County. He made his debut on 13 September 2014, in a 2–1 home defeat against Motherwell. His season was ended in November 2014, when he suffered a knee injury against Aberdeen and underwent cruciate ligament surgery. At the end of the season, he was released by the Dingwall club.

=== Dumbarton ===
In June 2015, Barr dropped down a division to sign for Scottish Championship side Dumbarton. He scored his first goals for the club in a 3–2 friendly defeat to Partick Thistle on 11 July 2015. He was appointed captain on 19 July 2015. He extended his deal in January 2016, rejecting a full-time offer from a rival club, after making 22 appearances during the first half of the season, scoring twice. Barr scored the winning goal in a match against Hibernian in February 2016. He signed a new one-year contract with Dumbarton in June 2016.

=== Greenock Morton ===
Barr rejected a new deal from Dumbarton in the summer of 2017 and joined fellow Championship side Greenock Morton as the club's development team head coach, whilst still being registered as a player. He scored what turned out to be his only goal for the club in a Scottish League Cup tie against Queen's Park.

=== Stirling Albion ===
Barr moved to Scottish League Two club Stirling Albion in January 2018. He was caretaker manager of Stirling in October 2018, after Dave Mackay left the club.

=== Annan Athletic ===
Barr was appointed assistant manager of League Two club Annan Athletic in November 2018, replacing Kevin Rutkiewicz who had left the club to take over as manager of Barr's former club Stirling Albion. In March 2021, the club announced that James Tose had been appointed in the role, although it was not made clear when Barr left the club.

== International career ==
Barr earned his first cap for Scotland in a 0–0 friendly draw against Northern Ireland at Hampden Park on 20 August 2008, becoming the first Falkirk player to play for Scotland since John White in 1959.

He retained his place and was named in George Burley's squad for Scotland's World Cup qualifying matches against Macedonia and Iceland.

Barr had already featured in the Scotland 'B' team, playing in a 2–2 draw with Finland in February 2007.

== Career statistics ==
As of match played 3 November 2020

Appearances and goals by club, season and competition
Club	Season	League			Scottish Cup		League Cup		Other		Total	
Club	Season	Division	Apps	Goals	Apps	Goals	Apps	Goals	Apps	Goals	Apps	Goals
Falkirk	2003–04	First Division	1	0	0	0	0	0	0	0	1	0
Falkirk	2004–05	First Division	2	0	0	0	0	0	0	0	2	0
Falkirk	2005–06	Premier League	1	0	0	0	0	0	0	0	1	0
Falkirk	2006–07	Premier League	36	1	2	0	4	0	0	0	42	1
Falkirk	2007–08	Premier League	33	1	2	1	2	0	0	0	37	2
Falkirk	2008–09	Premier League	35	2	5	0	4	0	0	0	44	2
Falkirk	2009–10	Premier League	38	1	0	0	1	0	2 (Note: Appearances in the Europa League)	0	41	1
Falkirk	Total		146	5	9	1	11	0	2	0	168	6
Forfar Athletic (loan)	2005–06	Second Division	15	0	0	0	0	0	0	0	15	0
Heart of Midlothian	2010–11	Premier League	13	0	0	0	1	0	0	0	14	0
Heart of Midlothian	2011–12	Premier League	15	0	4	1	1	0	0	0	20	1
Heart of Midlothian	2012–13	Premier League	32	1	1	0	3	0	2	0	38	1
Heart of Midlothian	Total		60	1	5	1	5	0	2	0	72	2
Kilmarnock	2013–14	Premiership	12	1	1	1	1	0	0	0	14	2
Ross County	2014–15	Premiership	6	0	0	0	0	0	0	0	6	0
Dumbarton	2015–16	Championship	31	3	3	0	1	0	1 (Note: Appearances in the Scottish Challenge Cup)	0	35	3
Dumbarton	2016–17	Championship	32	0	2	0	0	0	1	0	35	0
Dumbarton	Total		63	3	5	1	1	0	2	0	71	3
Greenock Morton	2017–18	Championship	2	0	0	0	3	1	0	0	5	1
Sitrling Albion	2017–18	League Two	12	0	0	0	0	0	2	0	14	0
Sitrling Albion	2018–19	League Two	6	0	0	0	0	0	0	0	6	0
Sitrling Albion	Total		18	0	0	0	0	0	2	0	20	0
Annan Athletic	2018–19	League Two	0	0	0	0	0	0	0	0	0	0
Annan Athletic	2019–20	League Two	16	0	2	0	5	0	0	0	23	0
Annan Athletic	2020–21	League Two	0	0	0	0	0	0	0	0	0	0
Annan Athletic	Total		16	0	2	0	5	0	0	0	23	0
Career total			338	10	22	3	26	1	7	0	392	14

== Honours ==
Heart of Midlothian

- Scottish Cup: 2011–12

Falkirk

- Scottish Cup: runner-up 2008–09

Individual

- SPL Young Player of the Month: December 2006
- SPL Player of the Month: March 2007
