= 2004–05 Dundee F.C. season =

Dundee
2004–05 season
- Manager: Jim Duffy
- Stadium: Dens Park
- Scottish Premier League: 12th (relegated)
- Scottish Cup: Third Round
- Scottish League Cup: Third Round
- Top goalscorer: League: Lovell (12); All: Lovell (15)
- Highest home attendance: 11,263 (vs Dundee United, 30 April 2005) (SPL)
- Lowest home attendance: 3,047 (vs Forfar Athletic, 24 August 2004) (SLC)
- Average home league attendance: 6,865
Home colours

The 2004–05 season saw Dundee compete in the Scottish Premier League where they finished in 12th position with 33 points and were relegated to the Scottish First Division.

== Final league table ==
Pos	Team	Pld	W	D	L	GF	GA	GD	Pts	Qualification or relegation (Note: Teams played each other three times (33 matches), before the league split into two groups (the top six and the bottom six) for the last five matches.)
8	Inverness Caledonian Thistle	38	11	11	16	41	47	−6	44	
9	Dundee United	38	8	12	18	41	59	−18	36	Qualification for the UEFA Cup second qualifying round (Note: As Celtic, the 2004–05 Scottish Cup winners, qualified for the UEFA Champions League via their league position, the place in the UEFA Cup was passed onto Dundee United, the cup runners-up.)
10	Livingston	38	9	8	21	34	61	−27	35	
11	Dunfermline Athletic	38	8	10	20	34	60	−26	34	
12	Dundee (R)	38	8	9	21	37	71	−34	33	Relegation to the Scottish First Division

Source: Scottish Professional Football League
Rules for classification: 1) Points; 2) Goal difference; 3) Goals scored
(R) Relegated

== Results ==
Dundee's score comes first

=== Legend ===
Win	Draw	Loss

=== Scottish Premier League ===
Match	Date	Opponent	Venue	Result	Attendance	Scorers
1	7 August 2004	Heart of Midlothian	H	0–1	7,770	
2	15 August 2004	Dundee United	A	2–1	11,118	Lovell 17', Sutton 47'
3	21 August 2004	Motherwell	H	1–2	4,849	Lovell 78'
4	28 August 2004	Hibernian	A	4–4	9,344	Sutton 7', Brady 65', Atle Larsen 79', Hernández 90'
5	11 September 2004	Celtic	A	0–3	56,936	
6	18 September 2004	Livingston	H	0–0	4,387	
7	26 September 2004	Rangers	H	0–2	9,404	
8	2 October 2004	Aberdeen	A	1–1	11,217	Sutton 1'
9	16 October 2004	Kilmarnock	H	3–1	4,367	Robb 30', Sutton 63', Anderson 87'
10	23 October 2004	Dunfermline Athletic	H	1–2	5,456	Anderson 52'
11	27 October 2004	Inverness Caledonian Thistle	A	1–2	1,254	Lovell 72'
12	30 October 2004	Heart of Midlothian	A	0–3	10,172	
13	6 November 2004	Dundee United	H	1–0	9,845	Sutton 86'
14	13 November 2004	Motherwell	A	0–3	4,406	
15	20 November 2004	Hibernian	H	1–4	5,274	Lovell 62'
16	28 November 2004	Celtic	H	2–2	9,539	Lovell (2) 35', 76'
17	4 December 2004	Livingston	A	0–1	4,509	
18	11 December 2004	Rangers	A	0–3	48,114	
19	18 December 2004	Aberdeen	H	1–0	7,310	Barrett 57'
20	27 December 2004	Kilmarnock	A	1–3	5,468	Sutton 39'
21	1 January 2005	Dunfermline Athletic	A	1–3	4,426	Barrett 40'
22	15 January 2005	Inverness Caledonian Thistle	H	3–1	5,567	Robb 28', McManus 48', Sutton 56'
23	22 January 2005	Heart of Midlothian	H	1–1	5,780	Caballero 54'
24	29 January 2005	Dundee United	A	2–2	12,703	McManus 71', Lovell 85'
25	12 February 2005	Motherwell	H	2–1	5,746	Lovell (2) 45', 55'
26	19 February 2005	Hibernian	A	0–4	10,938	
27	2 March 2005	Celtic	A	0–3	52,500	
28	5 March 2005	Livingston	H	0–1	5,830	
29	13 March 2005	Rangers	H	0–2	9,876	
30	19 March 2005	Aberdeen	A	1–1	10,474	McManus 73'
31	2 April 2005	Kilmarnock	H	1–0	5,494	Lovell 63'
32	9 April 2005	Dunfermline Athletic	H	2–1	5,995	Lovell 56', Sancho 62'
33	16 April 2005	Inverness Caledonian Thistle	A	2–3	4,786	McManus 74', Sutton 80'
34	23 April 2005	Kilmarnock	A	0–1	3,770	
35	30 April 2005	Dundee United	H	1–2	11,263	Lovell 64'
36	7 May 2005	Dunfermline Athletic	A	0–5	8,313	
37	14 May 2005	Inverness Caledonian Thistle	H	1–1	6,691	Sancho 49'
38	21 May 2005	Livingston	A	1–1	8,968	MacDonald 18'

=== Scottish Cup ===
Match	Date	Opponent	Venue	Result	Attendance	Scorers
R3	8 January 2005	Hibernian	A	0–2	9,706	

=== Scottish League Cup ===
Match	Date	Opponent	Venue	Result	Attendance	Scorers
R2	24 August 2004	Forfar Athletic	H	4–0	3,047	Lovell (3) 66', 82', 90', Anderson 87'
R3	21 September 2004	Livingston	A	1–2	1,736	Robb 67'
