= Graeme Churchill =

Scottish footballer

Personal information
- Full name: Graeme Churchill
- Date of birth: 20 July 1987 (age 39)
- Place of birth: Glasgow, Scotland
- Position: Forward

Youth career
- Falkirk

Senior career*
Years	Team	Apps	(Gls)
2005–2008	Falkirk	1	(0)
2008	Stirling Albion	1	(0)
- Bo'ness United
- * Club domestic league appearances and goals as of 18:40, 27 January 2008 (UTC)

Graeme Churchill (born 20 July 1987) is a Scottish former football striker who played for Falkirk and Stirling Albion.
