= Bobby Olejnik =

Austrian footballer (born 1986)

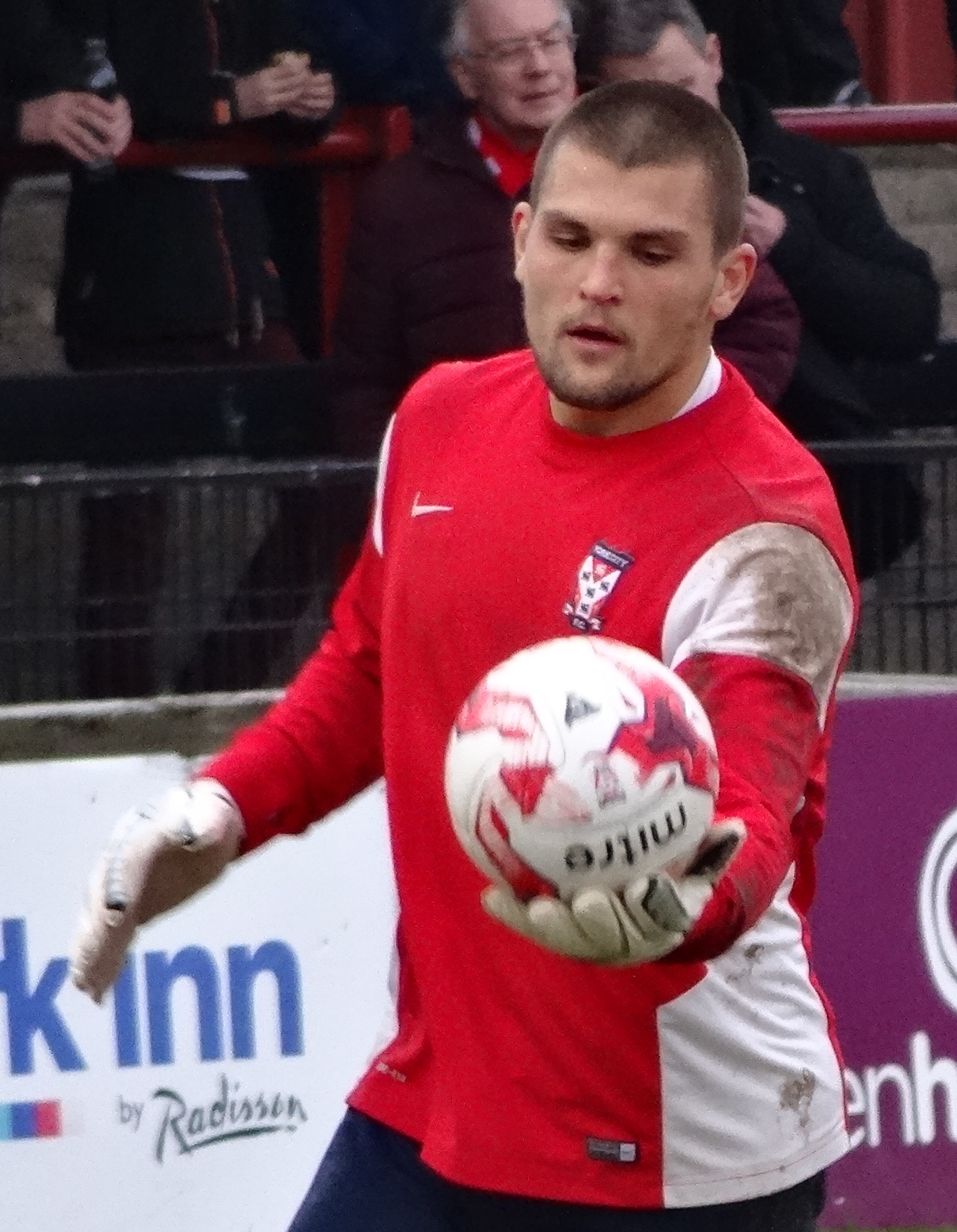
- Olejnik training with York City in 2015

Personal information
- Full name: Robert Olejnik
- Date of birth: 26 November 1986 (age 39)
- Place of birth: Vienna, Austria
- Height: 1.88 m (6 ft 2 in)
- Position: Goalkeeper

Youth career
- –2003: Austria Wien
- 2003–2006: Aston Villa

Senior career*
| Years | Team | Apps | (Gls) |
| 2006–2007 | Aston Villa | 0 | (0) |
| 2007 | → Lincoln City (loan) | 0 | (0) |
| 2007–2011 | Falkirk | 102 | (0) |
| 2011–2012 | Torquay United | 46 | (0) |
| 2012–2015 | Peterborough United | 88 | (0) |
| 2014–2015 | → Scunthorpe United (loan) | 13 | (0) |
| 2015 | → York City (loan) | 16 | (0) |
| 2015–2017 | Exeter City | 63 | (0) |
| 2017–2020 | Mansfield Town | 29 | (0) |
| Total | | 357 | (0) |

International career
| 2008–2009 | Austria U21 | 13 | (0) |
- * Club domestic league appearances and goals

Robert Olejnik (born 26 November 1986) is an Austrian former professional footballer who played as a goalkeeper.

Olejnik came through the youth teams of Austria Wien and Aston Villa and has played professionally for Falkirk, Torquay United, Peterborough United, Scunthorpe United, York City, Exeter City, and Mansfield Town. He also represented the Austria national under-21 team.

== Club career ==
=== Youth career ===
Olejnik was born in Vienna and started playing football from a young age first playing for Rapid Vienna. He moved to Austria Wien's youth system where he remained until 2003 when Olejnik moved to England to join Aston Villa's youth system after impressing goalkeeping coach Eric Steele, before landing his first professional contract.

=== Aston Villa ===
Olejnik is a product of Aston Villa's youth system. He joined League Two club Lincoln City on a loan deal until the end of the 2006–07 season, to help The Imps in their promotion push. Whilst there, he helped their Reserve side to lift the Pontin's Reserves League Cup. They had beaten Premiership sides Sheffield United and Blackburn Rovers on the way. After a 1–1 draw in 90 minutes against Hartlepool United, the match went to a penalty shoot-out. Olejnik saved two of the first five, making it 3–3 after each side having taken five. The scores made it to 6–6 before Olejnik saved a penalty, to then step up himself and score the winning goal.

=== Falkirk ===
However, on 30 May 2007, Olejnik was released by Villa manager Martin O'Neill and the following day joined Scottish club Falkirk. At the start of the season, Olejnik became second choice to Tim Krul who made 22 appearances. Olejnik made his debut for the club in a 1–0 win over Kilmarnock on 2 January 2008, coming on a substitute for Russell Latapy after Krul got sent off for unsportsmanlike conduct. Krul would later return to his parent club after suffering a shoulder injury and Olejnik would later become a first choice goalkeeper for the rest of the season. Olejnik managed to keep his first clean sheet for the club in a 0–0 draw against Aberdeen on 5 January 2008.

The following season, Olejnik managed to get playing time as a first choice goalkeeper. Because of that, this led the club signing Scott Flinders from Crystal Palace and replacing Olejnik as a first choice goalkeeper until Olejnik made a return in goal in a 1–1 draw against Inverness Caledonian Thistle At the end of the season on 11 June 2009, Olejnik signed a two-year extension with the club, keeping him at the club until 2011.

The following season with Mallo left Falkrik, Olejnik resumed his first choice goalkeeper status, having played all 38 games in the league. However, the club was relegated after failing to beat Kilmarnock on 9 May 2010 in a 0–0 draw. During the season, Olejnik made his European debut in the UEFA Europa League in the second round against Vaduz. In the first leg, Falkirk won 1–0, giving Olejnik his first clean sheet in Europe competition on 16 July 2009. In the second leg on 23 July 2009, Vaduz strike back and won 2–0, eliminating Falkirk in the Europa League, in process. In a 0–0 draw against Aberdeen, Olejnik was in a confrontation with team-mate Scott Arfield, who he believed had not properly defended a cross. As a result, referee Alan Muir booked the pair. After the match, Olejnik made an apology for an incident

Falkirk manager, Steven Pressley confirmed Olejnik would be leaving the club after his contract ran out on 30 June 2011. At the club, Olejnik made over 100 league appearances.

=== Torquay United ===
On 1 July 2011, Olejnik signed with League Two club Torquay United. Olejnik made his debut in a 2–1 friendly win over Tiverton Town. He started his first League Two match of the season with Torquay, at home to Burton Albion. Despite conceding two goals, he received the man of the match award. The following season, he helped the team set a new club record of 20 clean sheets. On 16 February 2012, Olejnik signed a contract extension, set to keep him at the club until 2014.

In April 2012, Olejnik was named in the PFA Team of the Year for League Two along with teammate Kevin Nicholson, Eunan O'Kane and Lee Mansell.

=== Peterborough United ===
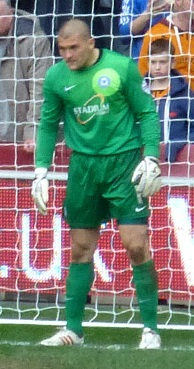
Olejnik playing for Peterborough United in 2014

On 18 June 2012, Olejnik signed a three-year contract with Championship side Peterborough United for an undisclosed fee. Olejnik was a replacement for both Joe Lewis and Paul Jones, who left for Cardiff City and Crawley Town respectively. Olejnik made his debut for Peterborough United on 14 August 2012 with a clean sheet in a 4–0 win over Southend United in the cup. He made his Championship debut against Leicester City six days later. Manager Darren Ferguson was later quoted saying "Bobby's a really good goalkeeper. The save he made in the first-half was outstanding, but he also gives us something we haven't had from our goalkeepers in recent seasons and that's excellent communication skills".

Olejnik was one of Posh's most prominent players during the 2012–13 campaign, making 275 saves, the most by any goalkeeper in the Championship.

At the end of the 2013–14 season he received the club's Player of the Year award. During the first leg of the 2013–14 League One play-off semi-final against Leyton Orient, he was awarded Man of the Match for a performance which helped Peterborough draw the game 1–1. At the end of the 2013–14 campaign, however, to the surprise of the fans, Olejnik was told that he was not going to be offered a new contract and would be put on the transfer list. He had kept 22 clean sheets during the campaign, equalling the club record.

On 19 July 2014, Olejnik signed on a 28-day emergency loan with Scunthorpe United and made his debut against Fleetwood Town on the same day. On 1 September Scunthorpe extended his loan until January 2015.

Olejnik joined League Two York City on loan until the end of the 2014–15 season on 5 January 2015, being reunited with manager Russ Wilcox, who had signed him for Scunthorpe. He received the club's player of the month award for January 2015, his first month with the club.

=== Exeter City ===
Olejnik signed for League Two club Exeter City on 2 June 2015 after his contract with Peterborough expired. He was released by Exeter at the end of 2016–17, despite the club hoping to be able to offer him a new contract.

=== Mansfield Town ===
On 8 June 2017, Olejnik signed for League Two club Mansfield Town. He was released by Mansfield at the end of the 2019–20 season.

=== Retirement ===
In July 2020 Olejnik announced his retirement from professional football, aiming to focus on a career in the technology sector, he attributed the career move in part to the COVID-19 pandemic.

== International career ==
Olejnik was also called up for the Austria U-21 squad to play Italy U-21 in late August 2006.

== Career statistics ==
Appearances and goals by club, season and competition
| Club | Season | League | | | National cup (Note: Includes Scottish Cup, FA Cup) | | League cup (Note: Includes Scottish League Cup, League/EFL Cup) | | Other | | Total | |
| Club | Season | Division | Apps | Goals | Apps | Goals | Apps | Goals | Apps | Goals | Apps | Goals |
|---|---|---|---|---|---|---|---|---|---|---|---|---|
| Aston Villa | 2006–07 | Premier League | 0 | 0 | 0 | 0 | 0 | 0 | — | | 0 | 0 |
| Lincoln City (loan) | 2006–07 | League Two | 0 | 0 | — | | — | | — | | 0 | 0 |
| Falkirk | 2007–08 | Scottish Premier League | 13 | 0 | 1 | 0 | 0 | 0 | — | | 14 | 0 |
| Falkirk | 2008–09 | Scottish Premier League | 15 | 0 | 1 | 0 | 2 | 0 | — | | 18 | 0 |
| Falkirk | 2009–10 | Scottish Premier League | 38 | 0 | 1 | 0 | 1 | 0 | 2 (Note: Appearances in UEFA Europa League) | 0 | 42 | 0 |
| Falkirk | 2010–11 | Scottish First Division | 36 | 0 | 2 | 0 | 3 | 0 | 1 (Note: Appearance in Scottish Challenge Cup) | 0 | 42 | 0 |
| Falkirk | Total | | 102 | 0 | 5 | 0 | 6 | 0 | 3 | 0 | 116 | 0 |
| Torquay United | 2011–12 | League Two | 46 | 0 | 2 | 0 | 1 | 0 | 2 (Note: Appearances in League Two play-offs) | 0 | 51 | 0 |
| Peterborough United | 2012–13 | Championship | 46 | 0 | 1 | 0 | 2 | 0 | — | | 49 | 0 |
| Peterborough United | 2013–14 | League One | 42 | 0 | 4 | 0 | 3 | 0 | 8 (Note: Six appearances in Football League Trophy, two in League One play-offs) | 0 | 57 | 0 |
| Peterborough United | 2014–15 | League One | 0 | 0 | 0 | 0 | 0 | 0 | — | | 0 | 0 |
| Peterborough United | Total | | 88 | 0 | 5 | 0 | 5 | 0 | 8 | 0 | 106 | 0 |
| Scunthorpe United (loan) | 2014–15 | League One | 13 | 0 | 0 | 0 | 1 | 0 | 2 (Note: Appearance(s) in Football League Trophy) | 0 | 16 | 0 |
| York City (loan) | 2014–15 | League Two | 16 | 0 | — | | — | | — | | 16 | 0 |
| Exeter City | 2015–16 | League Two | 45 | 0 | 4 | 0 | 2 | 0 | 2 | 0 | 53 | 0 |
| Exeter City | 2016–17 | League Two | 18 | 0 | 1 | 0 | 1 | 0 | 3 (Note: One appearance in EFL Trophy, two in League Two play-offs) | 0 | 23 | 0 |
| Exeter City | Total | | 63 | 0 | 5 | 0 | 3 | 0 | 5 | 0 | 76 | 0 |
| Mansfield Town | 2017–18 | League Two | 1 | 0 | 0 | 0 | 1 | 0 | 4 (Note: Appearances in EFL Trophy) | 0 | 6 | 0 |
| Mansfield Town | 2018–19 | League Two | 17 | 0 | 2 | 0 | 2 | 0 | 0 | 0 | 21 | 0 |
| Mansfield Town | 2019–20 | League Two | 11 | 0 | 0 | 0 | 0 | 0 | 3 | 0 | 14 | 0 |
| Mansfield Town | Total | | 29 | 0 | 2 | 0 | 3 | 0 | 7 | 0 | 41 | 0 |
| Career total | | | 357 | 0 | 19 | 0 | 19 | 0 | 27 | 0 | 422 | 0 |

== Honours ==
Peterborough United

- Football League Trophy: 2013–14

Individual

- PFA Team of the Year: 2011–12 League Two
- Peterborough United Player of the Year: 2013–14
