= Dayne Robertson =

Scottish footballer

Personal information
- Full name: Dayne Robertson
- Date of birth: 21 June 1988 (age 38)
- Place of birth: Edinburgh, Scotland
- Height: 5 ft 8 in (1.73 m)
- Position: Midfielder

Team information
- Current team: Craigroyston

Senior career*
Years	Team	Apps	(Gls)
2005–2010	Falkirk	8	(22)
2011–2014	Whitehill Welfare	20	(3)
2014	Penicuik Athletic	0	(0)
2014–2015	Civil Service Strollers	0	(0)
2015–2017	Tynecastle	0	(0)
2020-	Craigroyston	0	(0)
- * Club domestic league appearances and goals

Dayne Robertson (born 21 June 1988 in Edinburgh) is a Scottish football midfielder who plays for East of Scotland Football League Conference club Craigroyston.
