= Kevin Moffat =

Scottish footballer

Personal information
- Full name: Kevin Moffat
- Date of birth: 6 August 1988 (age 38)
- Place of birth: Edinburgh, Scotland
- Position: Striker

Senior career*
Years	Team	Apps	(Gls)
2007–2009	Falkirk	17	(0)
2008	→ Stirling Albion (loan)	3	(0)
- * Club domestic league appearances and goals as of 09:11, 26 May 2008 (UTC)

Kevin Moffat is a Scottish footballer, who plays for the Cobram soccer club in the Goulburn North Eastern Soccer Association in northern Victoria, Australia.

Moffat started his career with Falkirk, and made his first team debut on the opening day of the 2007/08 season in a 4–0 win over Gretna. On 31 January 2008, Moffat moved to Stirling Albion for a month's loan deal to gain useful first team experience. At the Bino's, he was involved in 3 matches before returning to the Bairns. He left by mutual consent in December 2009.
