= Gerard Aafjes =

Dutch footballer

Personal information
- Date of birth: 27 January 1985 (age 41)
- Place of birth: Mijdrecht, Netherlands
- Height: 1.81 m (5 ft 11 1/2 in)
- Position: Centre-back

Senior career*
Years	Team	Apps	(Gls)
2004–2007	FC Volendam	52	(2)
2007–2009	Falkirk	43	(1)
2009–2011	MVV Maastricht	58	(3)
2011–2013	FC Zwolle	16	(0)
2013–2014	Vejle BK	6	(0)
2014–2015	Quick Boys		
- * Club domestic league appearances and goals as of 21:27, 15 December 2010 (UTC)

Gerard Aafjes (Dutch pronunciation: [ˈɣeːrɑrt ˈaːfjəs]; born 27 January 1985) is a Dutch former professional footballer who played as a centre-back.

== Club career ==
Aafjes was born in Mijdrecht and joined FC Volendam in 2004. He later signed a two-year deal with Falkirk in 2007, where he scored once against Inverness Caledonian Thistle. He joined MVV in the summer of 2009, signing a deal that will keep him with the club until 2011.

On 1 October 2013 Aafjes signed a contract with Danish club Vejle Boldklub. He came to the club on a free transfer. The contract runs out in 2013. In summer 2014, Aafjes returned to Holland to play for fourth-tier Quick Boys.
