= John Hughes (footballer, born 1964) =

Scottish football player and manager (born 1964)

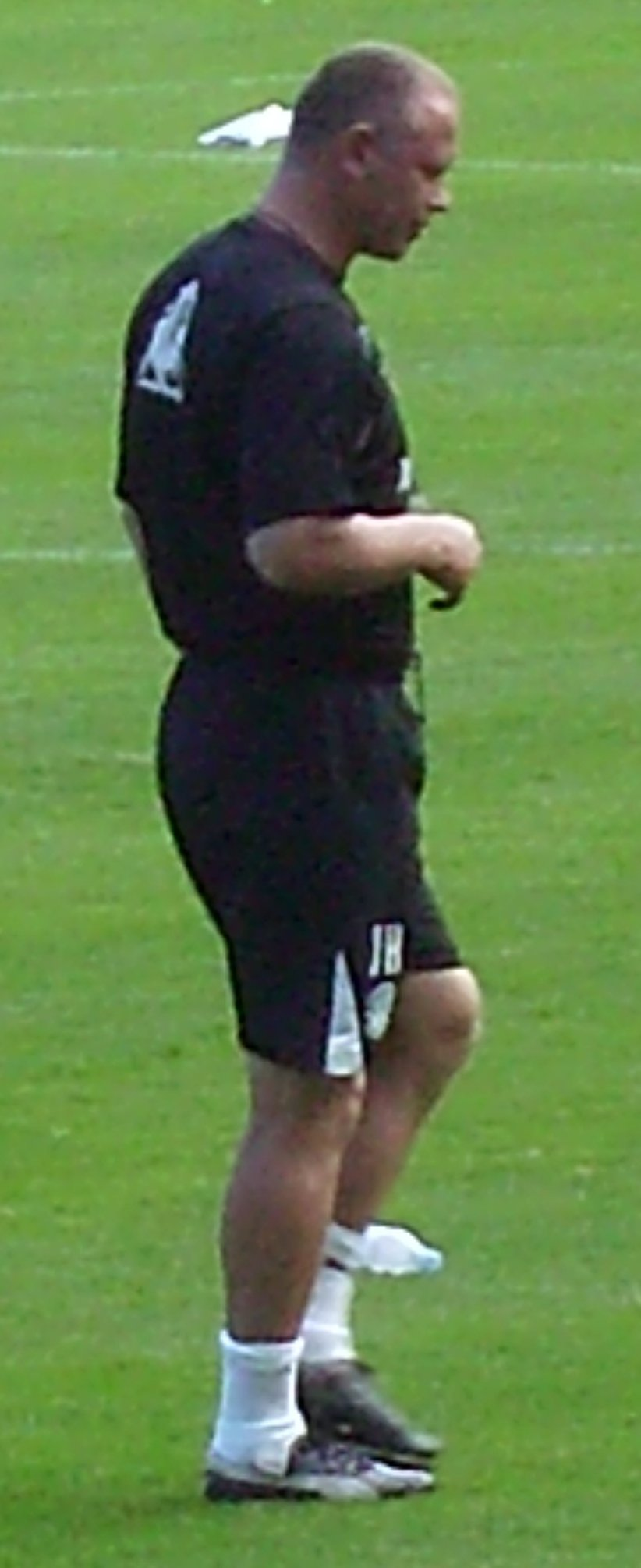
- Hughes in 2009

Personal information
- Full name: John Hughes
- Date of birth: 9 September 1964 (age 62)
- Place of birth: Edinburgh, Scotland
- Position: Defender

Youth career
- –1988: Newtongrange Star

Senior career*
Years	Team	Apps	(Gls)
1988–1989	Berwick Rangers	41	(14)
1989–1990	Swansea City	24	(4)
1989	→ Alloa Athletic (loan)	5	(0)
1990–1995	Falkirk	134	(7)
1995–1996	Celtic	31	(2)
1996–2000	Hibernian	72	(4)
2000–2002	Ayr United	48	(2)
2002–2005	Falkirk	79	(5)
Total		434	(38)

Managerial career
- 2003–2009: Falkirk
- 2009–2010: Hibernian
- 2012: Livingston
- 2012–2013: Hartlepool United
- 2013–2016: Inverness Caledonian Thistle
- 2017: Raith Rovers
- 2020–2021: Ross County
- 2021–2022: Dunfermline Athletic
- * Club domestic league appearances and goals

John "Yogi" Hughes (born 9 September 1964) is a Scottish professional football coach and former player.

Hughes played primarily as a central defender for several clubs, including Falkirk (two spells), Celtic, Hibernian and Ayr United. Towards the end of his playing career, Hughes took on coaching responsibilities, and was appointed manager of Falkirk in 2003 (initially as co-manager with Owen Coyle). Hughes guided the club to promotion to the Scottish Premier League and a Scottish Cup Final during his time in charge. He eventually left Falkirk to take up the managerial role at Hibernian in 2009, but left by mutual consent after sixteen months.

Hughes was appointed manager of Livingston in February 2012, but left in November to take over at English club Hartlepool United. He departed Hartlepool in May 2013 after being unable to prevent their relegation to League Two. Hughes was appointed manager of Inverness Caledonian Thistle in December 2013. He led the club to their first major silverware with the Scottish Cup in May 2015, and their first foray into European football, before he left in May 2016. Hughes then had a brief stint with Raith Rovers, which ended in them being relegated to Scottish League One. His next spell as a manager was with Ross County, where he managed to help them avoid relegation. Hughes was appointed Dunfermline Athletic manager in November 2021, but he resigned from this position in May 2022 following their relegation.

== Playing career ==
Hughes is "one of six kids from the classic, working-class family" in Leith. He started his playing career in junior football with Newtongrange Star, before beginning his senior career with Berwick Rangers, where he played as a striker. After a brief stint in the Football League with Swansea City, Hughes established himself as a central defender at Falkirk.

His playing career peaked when he signed for Celtic in 1995. He scored a late, headed equaliser in the Old Firm derby against Rangers at Ibrox on 17 March 1996.

He subsequently played for his local club Hibernian, Ayr United and finally returned to Falkirk in a joint player and coaching role.

Hughes shares his name with former Celtic, Crystal Palace and Sunderland player John 'Yogi' Hughes. As a result, Hughes is often referred to as 'Yogi' himself. He famously performed a streak during his first stint at Falkirk whilst team-mate Mo Johnston was being interviewed for STV's Scotsport.

== Coaching career ==
=== Falkirk ===
Hughes landed his first managerial job in 2003, when he and Owen Coyle were appointed co-managers of Falkirk. Coyle subsequently left Falkirk to join Ian McCall at Dundee United, leaving Hughes in sole charge. He then guided Falkirk to promotion to the Scottish Premier League in 2005. As well as maintaining their SPL status for four seasons, Hughes led Falkirk to the 2009 Scottish Cup Final, losing 1–0 to Rangers.

=== Hibernian ===
Hughes was appointed Hibernian manager in the 2009 close season. He led the club to Europa League qualification in his first season in charge, as they finished in fourth place in the SPL. Poor results at the start of the following season, however, led to fans jeering their own team. Hughes left the club by mutual consent on 4 October following a 2–0 defeat against St Johnstone.

=== Livingston ===
Hughes interviewed for the Swindon Town job in the 2011 close season. Hughes was appointed manager of Livingston on 14 February 2012.

=== Hartlepool ===
After nine months at Livingston, Hughes moved to English club Hartlepool United. He took the job when the team were in the midst of a 20-match-run without a win. Despite an upturn in form that earned him a Manager of the Month award, Hartlepool were relegated to Football League Two. Hughes publicly stated his desire to remain at the club, but he was sacked on 9 May 2013.

=== Inverness Caledonian Thistle ===
Hughes was appointed manager of Scottish Premiership club Inverness Caledonian Thistle on 4 December 2013 on a two-and-a-half-year contract. Soon after this appointment, Hughes led Inverness CT to their first major final after beating Hearts in a penalty shoot-out in the semi-final of the 2013–14 Scottish League Cup. Inverness drew 0–0 against Aberdeen in the final, but, after extra-time, lost the tie 4–2 on penalties.

At the beginning of season 2014–15, Caley Thistle's excellent early performances led him to receive the award of SPFL Manager of the Month for August. He followed this by also winning the award for January 2015, as his Inverness side continued to impress. In April 2015, Hughes led Caley Thistle to their first ever Scottish Cup final after a controversial 3–2 win over favourites Celtic, and at the end of the month he was shortlisted for PFA Scotland Manager of the Year. On 3 May, Hughes was announced as the winner of the managerial award ahead of Ronny Deila, Derek McInnes and Robbie Neilson. Further success soon followed as he guided Inverness to a highest ever league finish – 3rd place, and with it, a milestone debut in European competition for the club. The accolades continued, with Hughes winning the SFWA Manager of the Year award, to complete the managerial 'double' for 2014–15. He led the club to their first major silverware with a Scottish Cup final success over his old club Falkirk in the 2015 Scottish Cup Final to conclude the club's most successful season.

Hughes left Inverness at the end of the 2015–16 season.

=== Raith Rovers ===
Hughes was appointed manager of Scottish Championship club Raith Rovers in February 2017. The club finished ninth in the Championship, and were relegated to League One after they lost in the play-offs to Brechin City. Immediately after the game, Raith announced that Hughes and his assistant Kevin McBride would be leaving the club.

=== Ross County ===
On 21 December 2020, Scottish Premiership club Ross County appointed Hughes as their manager until the end of the season, at the time of his appointment the club were four points adrift at the bottom and had won only one of their last 16 league games. He guided the club to a tenth-place finish in the Premiership, avoiding relegation by three points, and he left at the end of his contract.

=== Dunfermline Athletic ===
Hughes became manager of Scottish Championship club Dunfermline Athletic in November 2021. The club finished ninth in the Championship and were relegated to League One after they lost in the play-offs to Queens Park. Hughes resigned later that month.

== Managerial statistics ==
As of match played on 7 May 2022

Managerial record by team and tenure
Team	From	To	Record				
Team	From	To	P	W	D	L	Win %
Falkirk	31 January 2003	31 May 2009	283	117	61	105	41.3
Hibernian	8 June 2009	4 October 2010	54	19	12	23	35.2
Livingston	14 February 2012	13 November 2012	27	12	5	10	44.4
Hartlepool United	13 November 2012	9 May 2013	29	8	9	12	27.6
Inverness Caledonian Thistle	4 December 2013	20 May 2016	121	50	30	41	41.3
Raith Rovers	10 February 2017	13 May 2017	15	4	4	7	26.7
Ross County	21 December 2020	24 May 2021	21	8	2	11	38.1
Dunfermline Athletic	15 November 2021	19 May 2022	25	6	8	11	24.0
Total			574	223	131	220	38.9

== Honours and achievements ==
=== Player ===
Falkirk

- Scottish First Division: 1993–94, 2002–03
- Scottish Challenge Cup: 1993–94

Hibernian

- Scottish First Division: 1998–99

=== Manager ===
Falkirk

- Scottish First Division: 2004–05
- Scottish Challenge Cup: 2004–05
- Stirlingshire Cup: 2006–07, 2007–08
- Scottish Cup: runners-up 2008–09

Inverness Caledonian Thistle

- Scottish Cup: 2014–15
- Scottish League Cup: runners-up 2013–14

=== Individual ===
- SPL Manager of the Month: December 2006
- SPL Manager of the Month: September 2009
- League One – Manager of the Month: February 2013
- SPFL Manager of the Month: August 2014
- SPFL Manager of the Month: January 2015
- PFA Scotland Manager of the Year: 2014–15
- SFWA Manager of the Year: 2014–15
