= Brian Allison =

Scottish footballer

Personal information
- Full name: Brian Allison
- Date of birth: 23 June 1988 (age 38)
- Place of birth: Edinburgh, Scotland
- Height: 1.78 m (5 ft 10 in)
- Position: Defender

Team information
- Current team: Stirling Albion

Senior career*
Years	Team	Apps	(Gls)
2005–2010	Falkirk	103	(3)
2008	→ Stirling Albion (loan)	14	(1)
2010	→ Stirling Albion (loan)	19	(0)
2010–	Stirling Albion	134	(1)
- * Club domestic league appearances and goals as of 07:52, 7 March 2012 (UTC)

Brian Allison (born 23 June 1988) in Edinburgh is a Scottish football defender, who plays for Stirling Albion.

== Football career ==
Allison made his début for Falkirk on 29 September 2007 against Inverness Caledonian Thistle. Allison made another appearance for the SPL outfit before going on loan to First Division side Stirling Albion in the January 2008 transfer window. Allison was initially placed on a one-month loan deal, with the possibility to extend until the end of the season. Alison made his début for Stirling Albion against St Johnstone on 26 January 2008. Allison scored his first professional career goal in Stirling Albion's match against Partick Thistle on 9 February 2008. A second loan spell with Stirling followed in 2010, before he joined them on a permanent basis after his release from Falkirk at the end of the 2009-10 season.

His second goal made headline news across Scotland, as it was scored in a 1–0 win against Rangers on 6 October 2012. Stirling Albion became the first Third Division club to beat Rangers since they were admitted to play in Scotland's lowest league. The result was even more remarkable as the Stirling Albion manager was absent, getting married. After the match, British based gambling company Ladbrokes revealed Allison's goal against Rangers saved the bookies about £5 million
