= Carl Finnigan =

English footballer (born 1986)

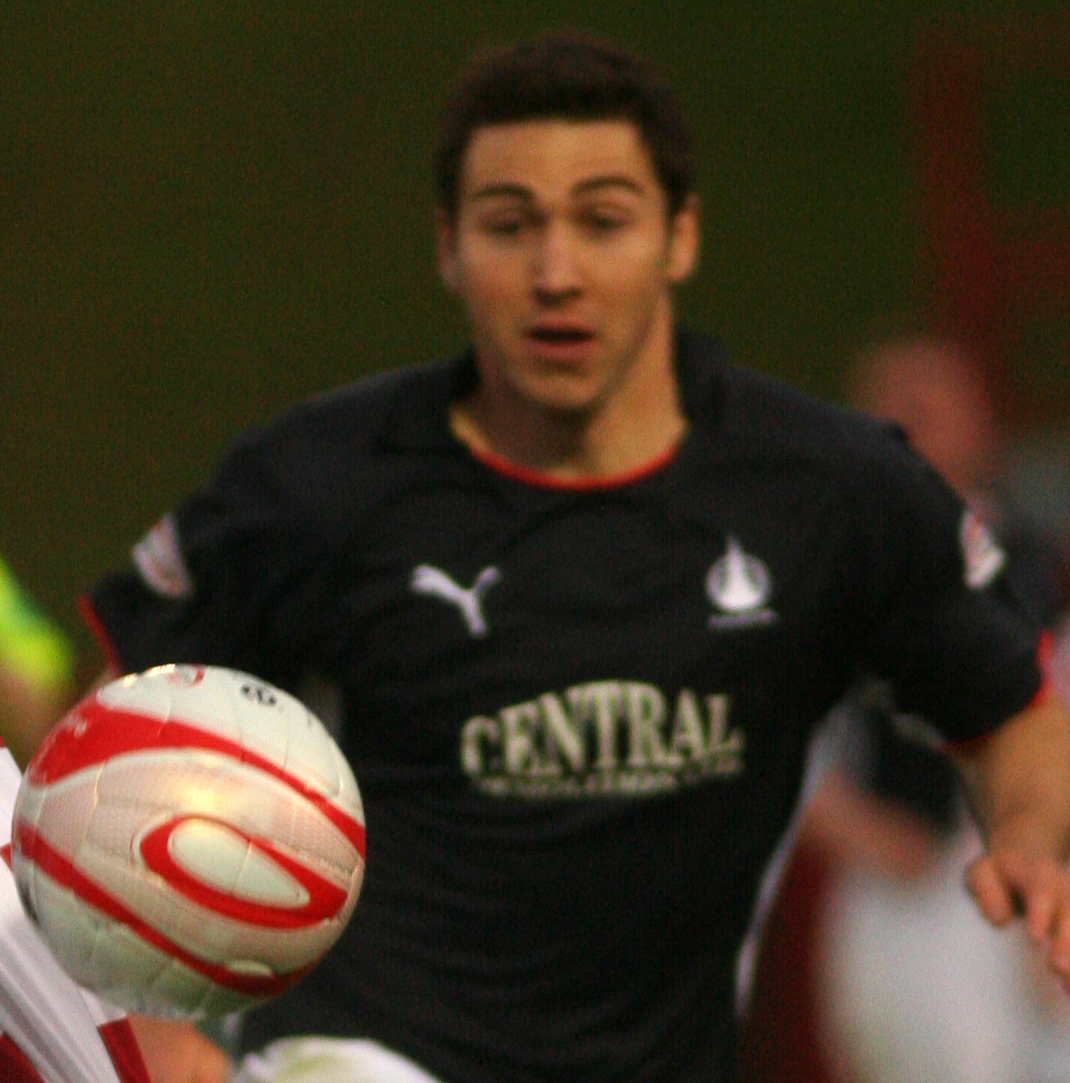
- Finnigan in 2009

Personal information
- Date of birth: 1 October 1986 (age 40)
- Place of birth: Jarrow, England
- Position: Forward

Team information
- Current team: Dunston UTS

Youth career
- –2001: Jarrow
- 2001–2003: Newcastle United

Senior career*
Years	Team	Apps	(Gls)
2003–2007	Newcastle United	0	(0)
2007–2011	Falkirk	113	(25)
2011–2012	St Johnstone	11	(0)
2012	→ Dundee (loan)	5	(3)
2012–2013	Dundee	8	(1)
2013–2014	Chippa United	9	(4)
2014–2015	Gateshead	22	(7)
2015–2016	Township Rollers	21	(9)
2016–2019	South Shields	115	(72)
2019–2020	Whickham	19	(11)
2019–2020	→ Morpeth Town (loan)	12	(4)
2020–2022	Morpeth Town	19	(1)
2022–	Dunston UTS	11	(8)
- * Club domestic league appearances and goals as of 13:17, 17 January 2023 (UTC)

Carl Finnigan (born 1 October 1986) is an English footballer who plays for Dunston UTS.

He has played for teams in Botswana, England, Scotland and South Africa during his career.

== Career ==
Finnigan was born in Jarrow, Tyne and Wear. As a youngster, he played for Jarrow F.C.'s under-age teams before joining Newcastle United. He scored 56 goals for Newcastle's reserve and academy teams from 102 starts and 20 substitute appearances, but never appeared in a competitive first-team game.

Finnigan joined Scottish Premier League club Falkirk on 23 January 2007, replacing Anthony Stokes who had left the "Bairns" to sign for Sunderland. He made his Falkirk debut, and his first appearance in a senior league, as a second-half substitute against Kilmarnock on 27 January 2007. The forward scored his first Bairns' goal three weeks later against Rangers, when he "played a neat one-two with Gow and drilled a shot beyond McGregor from the edge of the penalty area". In the 2008–09 season, he played a major role, scoring twice and winning a penalty, in Falkirk's 4–0 victory over rivals Inverness Caledonian Thistle in what proved a successful fight against relegation. He also scored the winner against the same opposition to take Falkirk through to the semi-final of the Scottish Cup, and had a goal disallowed in the Cup final. Before the 2009–10 season, Finnigan signed a new one-year contract with Falkirk, with an option for a second year. At the end of the 2010-11 season, he was released by the club.

On 24 June 2011, Finnigan signed for Scottish Premier League (SPL) club St Johnstone. In February 2012, Finnigan signed on loan for Dundee. He scored on his debut for Dundee, a late equaliser in a 1–1 draw with Falkirk after coming on as a second-half substitute. Finnigan then scored in a 3–2 win over Livingston. Finnigan returned to St Johnstone in April 2012 following a season-ending cartilage injury, but then signed for Dundee on 1 June.

In August 2013, Finnigan joined South African National First Division side Chippa United on a one-year contract. He scored on his debut on 6 October 2013 in a 1–1 draw with Thanda Royal Zulu and went on to score a total of 4 goals in 9 league appearances.

On 11 September 2014, it was announced that Finnigan had signed for Gateshead until the end of the season subject to international clearance. He made his debut on 20 September as a half time substitute against Welling United, scoring the equaliser in a 1–1 draw within 5 minutes of coming off the bench.

On 2 July 2015, Finnigan signed for Township Rollers of the Botswana Premier League scoring 9 goals within 21 appearances.

On 26 August 2016 he signed for South Shields. The club went on a 42-game win streak, getting promoted to the Northern Premier League Division One North and winning 4 trophies in one season.

On 23 May 2019 it was confirmed that Finnigan had joined Whickham. On 14 December 2019, he was loaned out to Morpeth Town for the rest of the season, and joined them on a two-year contract ahead of the 2020–21 season.

After seven months out with health issues, Finnigan joined Dunston UTS in September 2022.
