= List of Scottish Professional Football League managers =

This is a list of Scottish Professional Football League (SPFL) managers, in order of the date of their appointment. The SPFL has 42 member clubs and is split into four divisions: the Premiership (12 clubs), the Championship (10), League One (10), and League Two (10).

== List of managers ==
Manager	Nationality	Date of birth and Age	Club	Division	Caretaker appointment (Note: In some cases, managers are appointed as caretaker manager prior to being given the position on a more permanent basis. The date of caretaker appointment is used where applicable.)	Permanent appointment	Time as manager
Stewart Petrie	SCO	27 February 1970 (age 56)	Montrose	League One	—	4 December 2016	9 years, 350 days
John McGlynn	SCO	19 December 1961 (age 64)	Falkirk	Premiership	—	4 May 2022	4 years, 199 days
Paul Hartley	SCO	19 October 1976 (age 50)	Cove Rangers	League One	—	5 January 2023	3 years, 318 days
Jim Goodwin	IRL	20 November 1981 (age 44)	Dundee United	Premiership	—	1 March 2023	3 years, 263 days
Jordon Brown	SCO	28 November 1992 (age 33)	Peterhead	League One	21 March 2023	25 April 2023	3 years, 243 days
Ryan Strachan	SCO	1 August 1990 (age 36)	Peterhead	League One	21 March 2023	25 April 2023	3 years, 243 days
Michael McIndoe	SCO	2 December 1979 (age 46)	Edinburgh City	League Two	—	9 October 2023	3 years, 41 days
Willie Gibson	SCO	6 August 1984 (age 42)	Annan Athletic	League Two	—	16 May 2024	2 years, 187 days
David Gold	SCO	1 January 1993 (age 33)	Arbroath	Championship	17 August 2024	12 September 2024	2 years, 94 days
Colin Hamilton	SCO	7 May 1992 (age 34)	Arbroath	Championship	17 August 2024	12 September 2024	2 years, 94 days
Chris Aitken	SCO	21 September 1979 (age 47)	Stranraer	League Two	—	30 September 2024	2 years, 50 days
Simo Valakari	FIN	28 April 1973 (age 53)	St Johnstone	Premiership	—	1 October 2024	2 years, 49 days
Darren Young	SCO	13 October 1978 (age 48)	Clyde	League Two	—	23 October 2024	2 years, 27 days
Scott Kellacher	SCO	5 December 1980 (age 45)	Inverness Caledonian Thistle	Championship	—	23 October 2024	2 years, 27 days
Jim Weir	SCO	15 June 1969 (age 57)	Forfar Athletic	League Two	—	20 November 2024	1 year, 364 days
Mark Wilson	SCO	5 June 1984 (age 42)	Partick Thistle	Championship	18 February 2025	30 May 2025	1 year, 274 days
Neil Lennon	NIR	25 June 1971 (age 55)	Dunfermline Athletic	Championship	—	21 March 2025	1 year, 243 days
Sean Crighton	SCO	26 March 1990 (age 36)	Queen's Park	Championship	—	15 May 2025	1 year, 188 days
Steven Pressley	SCO	11 October 1973 (age 53)	Dundee	Premiership	—	2 June 2025	1 year, 170 days
Dougie Imrie	SCO	3 August 1983 (age 43)	Raith Rovers	Championship	—	25 November 2025	359 days
Darian MacKinnon	SCO	9 October 1985 (age 41)	Hamilton Academical	League One	1 December 2025	3 February 2026	353 days
Stuart Kettlewell	SCO	4 June 1984 (age 42)	Ross County	League One	—	30 December 2025	324 days
Martin O'Neill	NIR	1 March 1952 (age 74)	Celtic	Premiership	—	5 January 2026	318 days
Neil McCann	SCO	11 August 1974 (age 52)	Kilmarnock	Premiership	—	6 January 2026	317 days
Craig McLeish	SCO	27 March 1990 (age 36)	St Mirren	Premiership	12 March 2026	4 June 2026	252 days
Steven Whittaker	SCO	16 June 1984 (age 42)	Stirling Albion	League Two	—	9 May 2026	194 days
Stefan Laird	SCO	13 October 1989 (age 37)	Elgin City	League Two	11 May 2026	26 May 2026	192 days
Gary Naysmith	SCO	16 November 1976 (age 50)	Ayr United	Championship	—	16 May 2026	187 days
John Rankin	SCO	27 June 1983 (age 43)	Airdrieonians	League One	—	23 May 2026	180 days
Nicky Clark	SCO	3 June 1991 (age 35)	Queen of the South	League One	—	25 May 2026	178 days
Marvin Bartley	ENG	4 July 1986 (age 40)	Stenhousemuir	Championship	—	9 June 2026	163 days
Derek McInnes	SCO	5 July 1971 (age 55)	Rangers	Premiership	—	17 June 2026	155 days
Alfred Johansson	SWE	13 September 1990 (age 36)	Motherwell	Premiership	—	18 June 2026	154 days
Wouter Vrancken	BEL	3 February 1979 (age 47)	Heart of Midlothian	Premiership	—	25 June 2026	147 days
David Martindale	SCO	13 July 1974 (age 52)	Livingston	Championship	6 September 2026	—	74 days
Frankie McAvoy	SCO	9 July 1967 (age 59)	Livingston	Championship	6 September 2026	—	74 days
Michael Tidser	SCO	15 January 1990 (age 36)	Kelty Hearts	League Two	19 September 2026	23 October 2026	61 days
Marink Reedijk	NED	25 August 1992 (age 34)	Hibernian	Premiership	—	24 September 2026	56 days
Gary Miller	SCO	15 April 1987 (age 39)	Greenock Morton	Championship	1 October 2026	—	49 days
Michael O'Halloran	SCO	6 January 1991 (age 35)	Greenock Morton	Championship	1 October 2026	—	49 days
James Craigen	ENG	28 March 1991 (age 35)	The Spartans	League Two	—	10 October 2026	40 days
Simon Ferry	SCO	11 January 1988 (age 38)	East Kilbride	League One	—	29 October 2026	21 days
Scott Arfield	CAN	1 November 1988 (age 38)	East Fife	League One	—	8 November 2026	11 days
Mario Frick	LIE	7 September 1974 (age 52)	Aberdeen	Premiership	—	15 November 2026	4 days
Martin Fellowes	SCO	16 January 1998 (age 28)	Dumbarton	League Two	—	18 November 2026	1 day
Conor Sammon	IRL	6 November 1986 (age 40)	Alloa Athletic	League One	—	19 November 2026	0 days
