= Zander Clark =

Scottish footballer (born 1992)

Personal information
- Full name: Alexander Clark
- Date of birth: 26 June 1992 (age 34)
- Place of birth: Glasgow, Scotland
- Height: 6 ft 3 in (1.91 m)
- Position: Goalkeeper

Team information
- Current team: Heart of Midlothian
- Number: 28

Youth career
- Hamilton Academical
- 2008–2011: St Johnstone

Senior career*
Years	Team	Apps	(Gls)
2011–2022	St Johnstone	170	(0)
2011–2012	→ Elgin City (loan)	33	(0)
2013–2014	→ Queen of the South (loan)	24	(0)
2014–2015	→ Queen of the South (loan)	33	(0)
2022–	Heart of Midlothian	63	(0)
2026	→ Doncaster Rovers (loan)	7	(0)

International career^{‡}
2023–2024	Scotland	4	(0)
- * Club domestic league appearances and goals as of 16:25, 16 March 2026 (UTC) ‡ National team caps and goals as of 4 June 2024 (UTC)

Alexander Clark (born 26 June 1992) is a Scottish professional footballer who plays as a goalkeeper for Scottish Premiership club Heart of Midlothian and the Scotland national team.

After playing youth football with Hamilton Academical and St Johnstone, Clark began his senior career in the 2011–12 season on loan at Elgin City. He also had two loan spells at Queen of the South before becoming a St Johnstone regular after making his debut for them in 2015. He was part of the St Johnstone side that won both domestic cups during the 2020–21 season. Clark left St Johnstone after the 2021–22 season and signed for Heart of Midlothian in September 2022.

Clark made his senior international debut for Scotland in October 2023, aged 31.

== Early life ==
Alexander Clark was born 26 June 1992 in Glasgow, and raised in Clydebank.

== Club career ==
=== St Johnstone ===
Clark started his career in the youth sides at Hamilton Academical and then St Johnstone. On 4 July 2011, Clark joined Elgin City on loan ahead of the 2011–12 season.

On 17 October 2013, Clark signed for Queen of the South on loan until 1 January 2014. He made his debut on 19 October 2013, in a 2–1 defeat against Dundee. On 14 January 2014, the loan was extended until the end of the season.

On 14 May 2014, Clark signed a new two-year contract with St Johnstone. On 25 July 2014, Queen of the South announced that Clark had returned to the club on loan for the season. Queens announced on 28 May 2015 that Clark was returning to St Johnstone.

Clark made his first appearance for St Johnstone on 26 September 2015, coming on as a substitute in a 2–1 win against Dundee United. It was announced shortly afterwards that Clark had signed a new contract with St Johnstone, due to run until the summer of 2018.

In July 2017 he was taken to hospital following a head injury in a friendly match against Sunderland. He was released from hospital after being diagnosed with a concussion.

Clark was suggested as a possible candidate for the Scotland international squad during the 2018–19 season, particularly when he kept five consecutive clean sheets in the autumn and also after a good performance in a 2–0 home defeat against Celtic in early February. Later in February 2019 he suffered a hamstring injury.

During a Scottish Cup quarter-final against the Scottish champions Rangers in April 2021, Clark assisted in St Johnstone's 122nd-minute goal to take the game into a penalty shoot-out. Having come up the field for a corner, Clark flicked on Liam Craig's cross, and the ball was turned into the goal by Chris Kane. In the shoot-out itself, Clark saved attempts from James Tavernier and Kemar Roofe as St Johnstone won 4–2 to progress to the semi-finals. They went on to win the trophy, with Clark keeping a clean sheet in the final (as he had in the League Cup Final three months earlier).

Clark left St Johnstone in June 2022, and was linked with transfers to Dundee United and English club Stoke City.

=== Heart of Midlothian ===
On 2 September 2022, Clark joined Scottish Premiership club Heart of Midlothian on a three-year contract. He made his debut for the club on 24 December 2022, coming on as a substitute after Craig Gordon broke his leg.

Clark himself was injured ahead of the 2023–24 season. As of 12 October 2023, he had the highest save percentage in the Scottish Premiership during the 2023–24 season.

Clark lost his first-team place in the 2024–25 season, but in January 2025 signed a new contract with the club until 2027.

On 10 January 2026, Clark joined League One club Doncaster Rovers on loan for the remainder of the season.

== International career ==
Clark received his first call-up to the senior Scotland squad in August 2021 for games against Denmark, Moldova and Austria. He earned his second call up in November 2021. He pulled out of the Scotland squad in June 2022 as he was due to get married.

Clark was recalled to the Scotland squad in March 2023, as he played regularly for Hearts following an injury to Craig Gordon. He made his international debut in a friendly against France on 17 October 2023, aged 31.

He was called up to Scotland's provisional squad for UEFA Euro 2024.

== Career statistics ==
As of 14 March 2026

Appearances and goals by club, season and competition
Club	Season	League			National Cup		League Cup		Other		Total	
Club	Season	Division	Apps	Goals	Apps	Goals	Apps	Goals	Apps	Goals	Apps	Goals
St Johnstone	2011–12	Scottish Premier League	0	0	0	0	0	0	—		0	0
St Johnstone	2012–13	Scottish Premier League	0	0	0	0	0	0	0	0	0	0
St Johnstone	2013–14	Scottish Premiership	0	0	0	0	0	0	0	0	0	0
St Johnstone	2014–15	Scottish Premiership	0	0	0	0	0	0	0	0	0	0
St Johnstone	2015–16	Scottish Premiership	6	0	0	0	0	0	0	0	6	0
St Johnstone	2016–17	Scottish Premiership	26	0	2	0	3	0	—		31	0
St Johnstone	2017–18	Scottish Premiership	16	0	0	0	0	0	2 (Note: Appearances in UEFA Europa League)	0	18	0
St Johnstone	2018–19	Scottish Premiership	33	0	2	0	6	0	—		42	0
St Johnstone	2019–20	Scottish Premiership	29	0	3	0	2	0	—		34	0
St Johnstone	2020–21	Scottish Premiership	27	0	4	0	7	0	0	0	38	0
St Johnstone	2021–22	Scottish Premiership	32	0	1	0	3	0	6 (Note: Two appearances in UEFA Europa League, two in UEFA Europa Conference League, two in Scottish Premiership play-offs)	0	42	0
St Johnstone	Total		170	0	12	0	21	0	8	0	211	0
Elgin City (loan)	2011–12	Scottish Third Division	33	0	3	0	1	0	4 (Note: Two appearances in Scottish Challenge Cup, two in Scottish Division play-offs)	0	41	0
Queen of the South (loan)	2013–14	Scottish Championship	24	0	3	0	2	0	2 (Note: Appearances in Scottish Premiership play-offs)	0	31	0
Queen of the South (loan)	2014–15	Scottish Championship	33	0	1	0	2	0	3 (Note: One appearance in Scottish Challenge Cup, two in Scottish Premiership play-offs)	0	39	0
Heart of Midlothian	2022–23	Scottish Premiership	21	0	3	0	0	0	0	0	24	0
Heart of Midlothian	2023–24	Scottish Premiership	35	0	0	0	3	0	4 (Note: Appearances in UEFA Europa Conference League)	0	42	0
Heart of Midlothian	2024–25	Scottish Premiership	3	0	0	0	0	0	0	0	3	0
Heart of Midlothian	2025–26	Scottish Premiership	4	0	0	0	3	0	0	0	7	0
Heart of Midlothian	Total		63	0	3	0	6	0	4	0	76	0
Doncaster Rovers (loan)	2025–26	EFL League One	7	0	0	0	0	0	2 (Note: Appearances in EFL Trophy)	0	9	0
Career total			330	0	22	0	31	0	23	0	406	0

== Honours ==
St Johnstone

- Scottish Cup: 2020–21
- Scottish League Cup: 2020–21
