= 2017–18 Queen of the South F.C. season =

Queen of the South
2017–18 season
- Chairman: Billy Hewitson
- Manager: Gary Naysmith
- Stadium: Palmerston Park
- Scottish Championship: 6th
- Scottish Cup: Fourth round
- League Cup: Group stages
- Challenge Cup: Fourth round
- Top goalscorer: League: Stephen Dobbie (18); All: Stephen Dobbie (27)
- Highest home attendance: 2,019 vs. St Mirren, 23 December 2017
- Lowest home attendance: 1,062 vs. Falkirk, 3 April 2018
- Average home league attendance: 1,452
Home colours	Away colours	Third colours

The 2017–18 season is Queen of the South's fifth consecutive season back in the second tier of Scottish football and their fifth season in the Scottish Championship, having been promoted as champions from the Scottish Second Division at the end of the 2012–13 season. Queens will also be competing in the Challenge Cup, League Cup and the Scottish Cup.

== Summary ==
Queens finished sixth in the Scottish Championship for the second consecutive season.

Queens reached the fourth round of the Challenge Cup, losing to The New Saints after a penalty shoot-out 4-3, with no goals scored after extra time.

The Doonhamers were knocked out after the first round of the League Cup after the completion of fixtures in Group G that included Albion Rovers, East Kilbride, Hamilton Academical and Stenhousemuir.

Queens reached the fourth round of the Scottish Cup, losing 2-1 at Palmerston to Partick Thistle.

== Results and fixtures ==
Win Draw Loss Abandoned or Postponed

=== Preseason ===
1 July 2017 Friendly	Cowdenbeath	3–2	Queen of the South	Central Park
14:00	Muirhead 61', 71'; Syme 88'	QOSFC Report; QueensMad Report; Blue Brazil Photos	Stirling 3'; Dobbie 44'	Attendance: 246; Referee: Charleston

4 July 2017 Friendly	Annan Athletic	1–4	Queen of the South	Galabank
19:45	A. Trialist 6'	QOSFC Report; QueensMad Report; Black & Golds Photos	Dobbie 29', 34', 48'; Lucas 41' (o.g.)	Attendance: 350; Referee: Kirkland

7 July 2017 Friendly	Fleetwood Town	1–0	Queen of the South	Poolfoot Farm Training Complex
15:00	Coyle 62'	QOSFC Report; Blackpool Gazette Report; Trawlermen Photos		Attendance: Closed doors

=== Scottish Championship ===
5 August 2017 ScoChamp Match 1	Queen of the South	4–1	Brechin City	Palmerston Park
15:00	Lyle 28', 42'; Rankin 59'; Dykes 78'	QOSFC Report; BBC Sport Report; City Photos	O'Neil 75'	Attendance: 1,209; Referee: Steven; Man of the Match: Lyle

12 August 2017 ScoChamp Match 2	Dundee United	2 – 1	Queen of the South	Tannadice Park
15:00	McDonald 18'; McMullan (red card) 36'; Fraser 68'	QOSFC Report; BBC Sport Report; Terrors Photos	Fordyce 25'	Attendance: 5,842; Referee: Walsh; Man of the Match: Fordyce

19 August 2017 ScoChamp Match 3	Queen of the South	1 – 0	Dumbarton	Palmerston Park
15:00	Fordyce 44'	QOSFC Report; SPFL Report; Sons Photos		Attendance: 1,348; Referee: Duncan; Man of the Match: Rooney

26 August 2017 ScoChamp Match 4	Falkirk	1 – 4	Queen of the South	Falkirk Stadium
15:00	Gasparotto 89'	QOSFC Report; BBC Sport Report; Bairns Photos	Kerr 2'; Dobbie 41', 46', 49' (pen.)	Attendance: 4,108; Referee: Steven; Man of the Match: Dobbie

9 September 2017 ScoChamp Match 5	Livingston	2 – 2	Queen of the South	Tony Macaroni Arena
15:00	Mullin 40' (pen.); Mackin 81'	QOSFC Report; BBC Sport Report; Lions Photos	Stirling 71'; Lyle 77'	Attendance: 1,113; Referee: McLean; Man of the Match: Tapping

16 September 2017 ScoChamp Match 6	Queen of the South	1 – 2	Greenock Morton	Palmerston Park
15:00	Lyle 21'	QOSFC Report; BBC Sport Report; Ton Photos	Forbes 16'; Quitongo 20'	Attendance: 1,725; Referee: Newlands; Man of the Match: Lyle

24 September 2017 ScoChamp Match 7	St Mirren	3 – 1	Queen of the South	Paisley 2021 Stadium
16:10	C. Smith 24'; Morgan 27', 54'	QOSFC Report; BBC Sport Report; Buddies Photos	Kerr 64'	Attendance: 3,023; Referee: Cook; Man of the Match: Kerr

30 September 2017 ScoChamp Match 8	Inverness Caledonian Thistle	0 – 0	Queen of the South	Caledonian Stadium
15:00		http://www.qosfc.com/match-1654 QOSFC Report] BBC Sport Report; Caley Jags Photos		Attendance: 2,082; Referee: Anderson; Man of the Match: Rooney

14 October 2017 ScoChamp Match 9	Queen of the South	0 – 0	Dunfermline Athletic	Palmerston Park
15:00		QOSFC Report; BBC Sport Report; Pars Photos		Attendance: 1,834; Referee: Finnie; Man of the Match: Jacobs

21 October 2017 ScoChamp Match 10	Brechin City	0 – 1	Queen of the South	Glebe Park
15:00	Love (red card) 90'	QOSFC Report; BBC Sport Report; City Photos	Kerr 60' (red card) 90'	Attendance: 562; Referee: Charleston; Man of the Match: Kerr

28 October 2017 ScoChamp Match 11	Queen of the South	4 – 2	Falkirk	Palmerston Park
15:00	Dobbie 16'; Dykes 19'; Brownlie 75'; Lyle 90'	QOSFC Report; BBC Sport Report; Bairns Photos	McKee 85'; McGhee 89'	Attendance: 1,716; Referee: Kirkland; Man of the Match: Murray

4 November 2017 ScoChamp Match 12	Greenock Morton	1 – 2	Queen of the South	Cappielow Park
15:00	Harkins 7' (pen.)	QOSFC Report; BBC Sport Report; Ton Photos	Dobbie 43'; Fordyce 47'	Attendance: 1,677; Referee: Northcroft; Man of the Match: Fordyce

25 November 2017 ScoChamp Match 13	Queen of the South	0 – 3	Livingston	Palmerston Park
15:00	Jacobs (yellow card) 43' (yellow-red card) 77'	QOSFC Report; BBC Sport Report; Lions Photos	Penrice 32'; Fordyce 68' (o.g.); Byrne 81'	Attendance: 1,328; Referee: Steven; Man of the Match: McFadden

28 November 2017 ScoChamp Match 14	Dumbarton	2 – 2	Queen of the South	The YOUR Radio 103FM Stadium
19:45	Tapping 11' (o.g.); Morrison 81'	QOSFC Report; Sons Report; Sons Photos	Dobbie 70' (pen.); Wardrop 84' (o.g.)	Attendance: 474; Referee: Newlands; Man of the Match: Dobbie

2 December 2017 ScoChamp Match 15	Queen of the South	0 – 0	Inverness Caledonian Thistle	Palmerston Park
15:00		QOSFC Report; BBC Sport Report; Caley Jags Photos		Attendance: 1,293; Referee: Cook; Man of the Match: Kerr

9 December 2017 ScoChamp Match 16	Dunfermline Athletic	2 – 5	Queen of the South	East End Park
15:00	Clark 47'; McManus 85'	QOSFC Report; BBC Sport Report; Pars Photos	Kane 8', 27'; Dobbie 74', 80' (pen.), 90'	Attendance: 4,694; Referee: Collum; Man of the Match: Dobbie

16 December 2017 ScoChamp	Queen of the South	A - A	Dundee United	Palmerston Park
15:00		QOSFC Report; BBC Sport Report		Referee: Thomson
Note: Abandoned due to frozen pitch

23 December 2017 ScoChamp Match 17	Queen of the South	2 – 3	St Mirren	Palmerston Park
15:00	Dobbie 1'; Kane 6'	QOSFC Report; BBC Sport Report; Buddies Photos	Reilly 19', 35'; MacKenzie 68'	Attendance: 2,019; Referee: McLean; Man of the Match: Kane

30 December 2017 ScoChamp Match 18	Falkirk	3 – 2	Queen of the South	Falkirk Stadium
15:00	Grant 20'; Hippolyte 42'; Longridge 44'	QOSFC Report; BBC Sport Report; Bairns Photos	Dobbie 45'; Kerr 90'	Attendance: 4,285; Referee: Newlands; Man of the Match: Kerr

2 January 2018 ScoChamp Match 19	Queen of the South	0 – 0	Dumbarton	Palmerston Park
15:00		QOSFC Report; BBC Sport Report; Sons Photos		Attendance: 1,269; Referee: Cook; Man of the Match: Mercer

6 January 2018 ScoChamp Match 20	Livingston	0 – 1	Queen of the South	Tony Macaroni Arena
15:00		QOSFC Report; BBC Sport Report; Lions Photos	Kane 39'	Attendance: 1,067; Referee: Finnie; Man of the Match: Brownlie

13 January 2018 ScoChamp Match 21	Inverness Caledonian Thistle	3 – 1	Queen of the South	Caledonian Stadium
15:00	Vigurs 3'; Chalmers 29'; Doran 58'	QOSFC Report; BBC Sport Report; Caley Jags Photos	Bell 85'	Attendance: 2,209; Referee: Muir; Man of the Match: Leighfield

27 January 2018 ScoChamp Match 22	Queen of the South	3 – 1	Brechin City	Palmerston Park
15:00	Dobbie 7', 13', 73'	QOSFC Report; City Report; City Photos	Orsi 85'	Attendance: 1,211; Referee: Dallas; Man of the Match: Dobbie

3 February 2018 ScoChamp Match 23	St Mirren	2 – 0	Queen of the South	Paisley 2021 Stadium
15:00	L. Smith 4'; Davis 32' (pen.)	QOSFC Report; BBC Sport Report; Buddies Photos		Attendance: 4,585; Referee: Kirkland; Man of the Match: Cameron

17 February 2018 ScoChamp Match 24	Queen of the South	1 – 1	Greenock Morton	Palmerston Park
15:00	Dobbie 33'	QOSFC Report; BBC Sport Report; Ton Photos	Oliver 55'	Attendance: 1,489; Referee: Clancy; Man of the Match: Dobbie

24 February 2018 ScoChamp Match 25	Queen of the South	0 – 0	Dunfermline Athletic	Palmerston Park
15:00		QOSFC Report; BBC Sport Report; Pars Photos		Attendance: 1,429; Referee: D Robertson; Man of the Match: Marshall

27 February 2018 ScoChamp	Dundee United	P - P	Queen of the South	Tannadice Park
19:45		BBC Sport News
Note: Postponed due to heavy snowfall

6 March 2018 ScoChamp	Dundee United	P - P	Queen of the South	Tannadice Park
19:45		BBC Sport News
Note: Postponed due to waterlogged pitch

10 March 2018 ScoChamp Match 26	Dumbarton	0 – 1	Queen of the South	The YOUR Radio 103FM Stadium
15:00		QOSFC Report; BBC Sport Report; Sons Photos	Thomas 48'	Attendance: 642; Referee: Finnie; Man of the Match: Leighfield

13 March 2018 ScoChamp Match 27	Queen of the South	1 – 3	Dundee United	Palmerston Park
19:45	Thomas 21'	QOSFC Report; BBC Sport Report; Terrors Photos	Mikkelsen 24'; M. Smith 48', 57'	Attendance: 1,480; Referee: Muir; Man of the Match: Thomas

17 March 2018 ScoChamp Match 28	Queen of the South	1 – 3	St Mirren	Palmerston Park
15:00	Marshall 21'	QOSFC Report; BBC Sport Report; Buddies Photos	Mullen 17'; Morgan 52'; Magennis 63'	Attendance: 1,902; Referee: Madden; Man of the Match: Marshall

20 March 2018 ScoChamp Match 29	Dundee United	2 – 3	Queen of the South	Tannadice Park
19:45	Durnan 57'; McDonald 68'	QOSFC Report; BBC Sport Report; Terrors Photos	Thomson 21', 75'; Jacobs 41' (pen.)	Attendance: 4,088; Referee: Duncan; Man of the Match: Thomson

24 March 2018 ScoChamp Match 30	Queen of the South	3 – 3	Livingston	Palmerston Park
15:00	Thomson 28'; Dykes 30'; Todorov 90'	QOSFC Report; BBC Sport Report; Lions Photos	De Vita 41'; Halkett 52'; Hardie 60'	Attendance: 1,153; Referee: McLean; Man of the Match: Marshall

31 March 2018 ScoChamp Match 31	Dunfermline Athletic	3 – 1	Queen of the South	East End Park
15:00	Clark 33', 38', 90'	QOSFC Report; BBC Sport Report; Pars Photos	Marshall 69'	Attendance: 4,762; Referee: Collum; Man of the Match: Marshall

3 April 2018 ScoChamp Match 32	Queen of the South	2 – 2	Falkirk	Palmerston Park
19:45	Thomson 51'; Brownlie 73'	QOSFC Report; BBC Sport Report; Bairns Photos	Nelson 5'; Longridge 87'	Attendance: 1,062; Referee: Kirkland; Man of the Match: Thomson

7 April 2018 ScoChamp Match 33	Queen of the South	0 – 2	Inverness Caledonian Thistle	Palmerston Park
15:00		QOSFC Report; BBC Sport Report; Caley Jags Photos	Austin 9'; Oakley 30'	Attendance: 1,140; Referee: Anderson; Man of the Match: Thomson

14 April 2018 ScoChamp Match 34	Greenock Morton	0 – 1	Queen of the South	Cappielow Park
15:00		QOSFC Report; BBC Sport Report; Ton Photos	Dykes 69'	Attendance: 1,514; Referee: Finnie; Man of the Match: Mercer

21 April 2018 ScoChamp Match 35	Queen of the South	3 – 0	Dundee United	Palmerston Park
15:00	Dykes 9'; Thomson 31'; Murray 77'	QOSFC Report; BBC Sport Report; Terrors Photos		Attendance: 1,531; Referee: Newlands; Man of the Match: Todd

28 April 2018 ScoChamp Match 36	Brechin City	1 – 5	Queen of the South	Glebe Park
15:00	Layne 78'	QOSFC Report; BBC Sport Report; City Photos	Dobbie 45+3', 60', 74'; Dykes 45+8', 65'	Attendance: 661; Referee: Kirkland; Man of the Match: Dobbie

=== Scottish Challenge Cup ===
15 August 2017 Round 1	Queen of the South	4 – 0	Airdrieonians	Palmerston Park
19:45	Lyle 14'; Kerr 25'; Brownlie 44'; Rooney 88'	QOSFC Report; SPFL Report; Diamonds Photos		Attendance: 1,012; Referee: Cook; Man of the Match: Carmichael

2 September 2017 Round 2	Berwick Rangers	0 – 5	Queen of the South	Shielfield Park
15:00		QOSFC Report; SPFL Report; Wee Gers Photos	Rooney 53'; Dobbie 58', 63'; Lyle 60'; Kane 87'	Attendance: 621; Referee: Aitken; Man of the Match: Dobbie

7 October 2017 Round 3	Montrose	1 – 3 (a.e.t.)	Queen of the South	Links Park
15:00	Masson 23'	QOSFC Report; SPFL Report; Gable Endies Photos	Dobbie 87', 120'; Dykes 113'	Attendance: 534; Referee: Graham; Man of the Match: Dykes

12 November 2017 Round 4	The New Saints	0 – 0 (a.e.t.) (4 – 3 p)	Queen of the South	Park Hall
14:45		QOSFC Report; BBC Sport Report; TNS Photos		Attendance: 808; Referee: Crangle: Irish FA; Man of the Match: McFadden
	Penalties
	(penalty missed) Mullan; (penalty missed) Brobbel; (penalty scored) Seargeant; (penalty scored) Darlington; (penalty scored) Fletcher; (penalty scored) Harrison		(penalty missed) Lyle; (penalty missed) Dobbie; (penalty scored) Jacobs; (penalty scored) McFadden; (penalty scored) Fordyce; (penalty missed) Stirling

=== Scottish League Cup ===
15 July 2017 Round 1;Group G-1	Stenhousemuir	1 – 3	Queen of the South	Ochilview Park
15:00	McGuigan 16' (pen.)	QOSFC Report; BBC Sport Report; Warriors Photos	Dobbie 69', 85'; Rooney 83'	Attendance: 384; Referee: Duncan; Man of the Match: Dobbie

18 July 2017 Round 1;Group G-2	Queen of the South	0 – 0 (1 – 4 p)	East Kilbride	Palmerston Park
19:45		QOSFC Report; BBC Sport Report; Kilby Photos		Attendance: 1,055; Referee: Lowe; Man of the Match: Dobbie
	Penalties
	Jacobs (penalty missed); Tapping (penalty missed); Dobbie (penalty scored)		Strachan (penalty scored); Ferris (penalty scored); Hughes (penalty scored); McNeil (penalty scored)

22 July 2017 Round 1;Group G-3	Hamilton Acacemical	1 – 1 (6 – 5 p)	Queen of the South	SuperSeal Stadium
15:00	Boyd 88'	QOSFC Report; BBC Sport Report; Accies Photos	Dobbie 89'	Attendance: 1,047; Referee: Collum; Man of the Match: Martin
	Penalties
	Gillespie (penalty missed); Redmond (penalty missed); Crawford (penalty scored); Sarris (penalty scored); Bingham (penalty scored); Boyd (penalty scored); MacKinnon (penalty scored); Templeton (penalty scored)		Lyle (penalty scored); Dobbie (penalty scored); Dykes (penalty missed); Jacobs (penalty scored); Rankin (penalty missed); Fordyce (penalty scored); Tapping (penalty scored); Brownlie (penalty missed)

29 July 2017 Round 1;Group G-4	Queen of the South	2 – 2 (4 – 3 p)	Albion Rovers	Palmerston Park
15:00	Dobbie 64'; Brownlie 85'	QOSFC Report; BBC Sport Report; Wee Rovers Photos	Trouten 38', 82' (pen.)	Attendance: 1,002; Referee: Millar; Man of the Match: Dobbie
	Penalties
	Dobbie (penalty scored); Murray (penalty scored); Carmichael (penalty missed); Fordyce (penalty scored); Jacobs (penalty scored)		McLaughlin (penalty scored); Higgins (penalty scored); Davidson (penalty missed); Trouten (penalty scored); Fisher (penalty missed)

=== Scottish Cup ===
18 November 2017 Round 3	Montrose	0 – 0	Queen of the South	Links Park
15:00		QOSFC Report; BBC Sport Report; Gable Endies Photos		Attendance: 512; Referee: McKendrick; Man of the Match: Brownlie

21 November 2017 Round 3 Replay	Queen of the South	2 – 1	Montrose	Palmerston Park
19:45	Dobbie 24'; Lyle 67'	QOSFC Report; BBC Sport Report; Gable Endies Photos	Webster 43'	Attendance: 794; Referee: McKendrick; Man of the Match: Lyle

20 January 2018 Round 4	Queen of the South	1 – 2	Partick Thistle	Palmerston Park
15:00	Fergusson 55'	QOSFC Report; BBC Sport Report; Harry Wraggs Photos	Sammon 42', 81'	Attendance: 2,338; Referee: Collum; Man of the Match: Rooney

== Player statistics ==
=== Captains ===
No.	P	Name	Country	No. games	Notes
8	MF	John Rankin	(Scotland)	40	Club Captain
11	FW	Stephen Dobbie	(Scotland)	7	Vice Captain

Last updated: 28 April 2018
Source: Competitive match reports.
Competitive matches only
Matches started as captain only
Country: FIFA nationality; No.: Squad number; P: Position; Name: Player name; No. Games: Number of games started as captain.

=== Squad ===
Last updated 28 April 2018

No.	Pos	Nat	Player	Total		Scottish Championship		Challenge Cup		League Cup		Scottish Cup	
No.	Pos	Nat	Player	Apps	Goals	Apps	Goals	Apps	Goals	Apps	Goals	Apps	Goals
1	GK	(Scotland) SCO	Alan Martin	31	0	22+0	0	2+0	0	4+0	0	3+0	0
2	DF	(Scotland) SCO	Shaun Rooney	34	3	14+10	0	3+1	2	2+1	1	3+0	0
3	DF	(England) ENG	Jordan Marshall	39	2	29+0	2	4+0	0	4+0	0	2+0	0
4	DF	(Scotland) SCO	Callum Fordyce	40	3	28+1	3	4+0	0	4+0	0	3+0	0
5	DF	(Scotland) SCO	Darren Brownlie	44	4	32+1	2	4+0	1	4+0	1	3+0	0
*6	MF	(Scotland) SCO	Callum Tapping	22	0	7+7	0	3+0	0	2+2	0	0+1	0
6	DF	(Scotland) SCO	Kyle Cameron	9	0	7+1	0	0+0	0	0+0	0	0+1	0
*7	MF	(Scotland) SCO	Andy Stirling	23	1	5+8	1	2+2	0	4+0	0	1+1	0
8	MF	(Scotland) SCO	John Rankin	44	1	31+3	1	3+0	0	3+1	0	3+0	0
9	FW	(Scotland) SCO	Derek Lyle	35	8	9+17	5	2+1	2	2+2	0	2+0	1
*10	FW	(Scotland) SCO	Chris Kane	20	5	12+4	4	2+2	1	0+0	0	0+0	0
10	MF	(Scotland) SCO	Dom Thomas	14	2	12+2	2	0+0	0	0+0	0	0+0	0
11	FW	(Scotland) SCO	Stephen Dobbie	42	27	31+0	18	4+0	4	4+0	4	3+0	1
12	MF	(Scotland) SCO	Joe Thomson	18	5	16+1	5	0+0	0	0+0	0	1+0	0
13	GK	(Scotland) SCO	Sam Henderson	0	0	0+0	0	0+0	0	0+0	0	0+0	0
14	MF	(South Africa) RSA	Kyle Jacobs	38	1	29+0	1	3+0	0	4+0	0	2+0	0
*15	DF	(Scotland) SCO	Jason Kerr	19	5	18+0	4	1+0	1	0+0	0	0+0	0
15	FW	(Bulgaria) BUL	Nikolay Todorov	8	1	0+8	1	0+0	0	0+0	0	0+0	0
*16	FW	(Scotland) SCO	James McFadden	15	0	6+5	0	1+1	0	0+0	0	1+1	0
16	MF	(England) ENG	Josh Todd	8	0	8+0	0	0+0	0	0+0	0	0+0	0
17	FW	(Scotland) SCO	Connor Murray	31	1	10+10	1	1+3	0	2+2	0	1+2	0
18	FW	(Scotland) SCO	Ross Fergusson	10	1	4+4	0	0+0	0	0+0	0	1+1	1
19	MF	(Scotland) SCO	Owen Bell	4	1	0+4	1	0+0	0	0+0	0	0+0	0
20	GK	(Scotland) SCO	Jack Leighfield	18	0	14+2	0	2+0	0	0+0	0	0+0	0
21	MF	(Scotland) SCO	Dan Carmichael	9	0	3+4	0	1+0	0	0+1	0	0+0	0
*22	MF	(England) ENG	Jesse Akubuine	2	0	0+1	0	0+0	0	0+1	0	0+0	0
*23	GK	(England) ENG	Lee Robinson	0	0	0+0	0	0+0	0	0+0	0	0+0	0
23	DF	(Malta) MLT	Myles Beerman	4	0	1+2	0	0+0	0	0+0	0	1+0	0
24	DF	(Scotland) SCO	Scott Mercer	26	0	18+2	0	0+3	0	2+0	0	1+0	0
25	FW	(Australia) AUS	Lyndon Dykes	44	8	30+4	7	2+1	1	3+1	0	2+1	0
*26	DF	(Scotland) SCO	Ewan Gourlay	0	0	0+0	0	0+0	0	0+0	0	0+0	0
27	DF	(England) ENG	Daniel Harvey	0	0	0+0	0	0+0	0	0+0	0	0+0	0
28	FW	(Scotland) SCO	Declan Tremble	0	0	0+0	0	0+0	0	0+0	0	0+0	0
34	GK	(Scotland) SCO	Curtis Lyle	0	0	0+0	0	0+0	0	0+0	0	0+0	0

=== Disciplinary record ===
As of 28 April 2018 (UTC)

Number	Nation	Position	Name	Scottish Championship		Challenge Cup		League Cup		Scottish Cup		Total	
Number	Nation	Position	Name	Yellow card	Red card	Yellow card	Red card	Yellow card	Red card	Yellow card	Red card	Yellow card	Red card
2	(Scotland)	DF	Shaun Rooney	8	0	1	0	0	0	0	0	9	0
3	(England)	DF	Jordan Marshall	1	0	0	0	0	0	0	0	1	0
4	(Scotland)	DF	Callum Fordyce	3	0	0	0	0	0	0	0	3	0
5	(Scotland)	DF	Darren Brownlie	7	0	0	0	0	0	0	0	7	0
6	(Scotland)	MF	Callum Tapping	2	0	0	0	0	0	0	0	2	0
8	(Scotland)	MF	John Rankin	4	0	0	0	0	0	0	0	4	0
9	(Scotland)	FW	Derek Lyle	1	0	0	0	0	0	0	0	1	0
10	(Scotland)	FW	Chris Kane	3	0	0	0	0	0	0	0	3	0
10	(Scotland)	MF	Dom Thomas	1	0	0	0	0	0	0	0	1	0
11	(Scotland)	FW	Stephen Dobbie	3	0	0	0	0	0	0	0	3	0
12	(Scotland)	MF	Joe Thomson	4	0	0	0	0	0	0	0	4	0
14	(South Africa)	MF	Kyle Jacobs	7	1	0	0	1	0	0	0	8	1
*15	(Scotland)	DF	Jason Kerr	1	0	0	0	0	0	0	0	1	0
16	(Scotland)	FW	James McFadden	2	0	0	0	0	0	0	0	2	0
16	(England)	MF	Josh Todd	1	0	0	0	0	0	0	0	1	0
21	(Scotland)	MF	Dan Carmichael	1	0	0	0	0	0	0	0	1	0
24	(Scotland)	DF	Scott Mercer	3	0	0	0	1	0	0	0	4	0
25	(Australia)	FW	Lyndon Dykes	8	0	0	0	0	0	1	0	9	0
Totals				60	1	1	0	2	0	1	0	64	1

=== Top scorers ===
Last updated 28 April 2018

Position	Nation	Name	Scottish Championship	Challenge Cup	League Cup	Scottish Cup	Total
1	(Scotland)	Stephen Dobbie	18	4	4	1	27
2	(Scotland)	Derek Lyle	5	2	0	1	8
=	(Australia)	Lyndon Dykes	7	1	0	0	8
4	(Scotland)	Jason Kerr	4	1	0	0	5
=	(Scotland)	Chris Kane	4	1	0	0	5
=	(Scotland)	Joe Thomson	5	0	0	0	5
7	(Scotland)	Darren Brownlie	2	1	1	0	4
8	(Scotland)	Shaun Rooney	0	2	1	0	3
=	(Scotland)	Callum Fordyce	3	0	0	0	3
10	(Scotland)	Dom Thomas	2	0	0	0	2
=	(England)	Jordan Marshall	2	0	0	0	2
12	(Scotland)	John Rankin	1	0	0	0	1
=	(Scotland)	Andy Stirling	1	0	0	0	1
=	(Scotland)	Owen Bell	1	0	0	0	1
=	(Scotland)	Ross Fergusson	0	0	0	1	1
=	(South Africa)	Kyle Jacobs	1	0	0	0	1
=	(Bulgaria)	Nikolay Todorov	1	0	0	0	1
=	(Scotland)	Connor Murray	1	0	0	0	1

=== Clean sheets ===
R	Pos	Nat	Name	Scottish Championship	Challenge Cup	League Cup	Scottish Cup	Total
1	GK	(Scotland)	Alan Martin	8	1	1	1	11
20	GK	(Scotland)	Jack Leighfield	3	2	0	0	5
			Totals	11	3	1	1	16

Last updated: 28 April 2018
Source: Match reports in Competitive matches

== Team statistics ==
=== League table ===
Pos	Team	Pld	W	D	L	GF	GA	GD	Pts	Promotion, qualification or relegation
4	Dunfermline Athletic	36	16	11	9	60	35	+25	59	Qualification for the Premiership play-off quarter-final
5	Inverness Caledonian Thistle	36	16	9	11	53	37	+16	57	
6	Queen of the South	36	14	10	12	59	53	+6	52	
7	Greenock Morton	36	13	11	12	47	40	+7	50	
8	Falkirk	36	12	11	13	45	49	−4	47	

Source: Soccerway
Rules for classification: 1) Points; 2) Goal difference; 3) Goals scored; 4) Points in head-to-head matches; 5) Goal difference in hth matches; 6). Goals scored in hth matches; 7). Play-off (only for deciding promotion, play-off participation and relegation).

=== Division summary ===
Round	1	2	3	4	5	6	7	8	9	10	11	12	13	14	15	16	17	18	19	20	21	22	23	24	25	26	27	28	29	30	31	32	33	34	35	36
Ground	H	A	H	A	A	H	A	A	H	A	H	A	H	A	H	A	H	A	H	A	A	H	A	H	H	A	H	H	A	H	A	H	H	A	H	A
Result	W	L	W	W	D	L	L	D	D	W	W	W	L	D	D	W	L	L	D	W	L	W	L	D	D	W	L	L	W	D	L	D	L	W	W	W
Position	1	4	3	2	3	5	6	5	6	5	5	5	5	5	6	3	6	6	6	4	5	5	6	6	6	5	6	6	6	6	6	6	7	7	7	6

Updated to match(es) played on 28 April 2018. Source:
A = Away; H = Home; W = Win; D = Draw; L = Loss

=== Management statistics ===
Last updated 28 April 2018

Name	From	To	P	W	D	L	Win% (Note: Win% is the percentage of matches won rounded to two decimal places.)
Gary Naysmith	15 July 2017	28 April 2018	47	19	14	14	40.43

== Transfers ==
=== Players in ===
Player	From	Fee
(Scotland) Andy Stirling	(Scotland) Dumbarton	Free
(Scotland) Callum Fordyce	(Scotland) Dunfermline Athletic	Free
(Scotland) Alan Martin	(Scotland) Dumbarton	Free
(Scotland) Shaun Rooney	(England) York City	Free
(Scotland) Chris Kane	(Scotland) St Johnstone	Loan
(Scotland) Jason Kerr	(Scotland) St Johnstone	Loan
(Scotland) James McFadden	(Scotland) Motherwell	Free
(Scotland) Joe Thomson	(Scotland) Celtic	Loan
(Malta) Myles Beerman	(Scotland) Rangers	Loan
(Scotland) Kyle Cameron	(England) Newcastle United	Loan
(Scotland) Dom Thomas	(Scotland) Kilmarnock	Loan
(Bulgaria) Nikolay Todorov	(Scotland) Heart of Midlothian	Loan
(Scotland) Curtis Lyle	(Scotland) Kilmarnock	Loan
(England) Josh Todd	(Scotland) St Mirren	Loan

=== Players out ===
Player	To	Fee
(Scotland) Jamie Hamill	(Scotland) Stranraer	Free
(Scotland) Chris Higgins	(Scotland) Ayr United	Free
(Scotland) Andy Dowie	(Scotland) Dumbarton	Free
(Scotland) Scott Hooper	(Scotland) Annan Athletic	Free
(Scotland) Dale Hilson	(Scotland) St Mirren	Free
(England) Steven Rigg	(England) Carlisle United	Free
(England) Owen Moxon	(Scotland) Annan Athletic	Free
(Scotland) Dean Brotherston	(Australia) Sunshine George Cross	Free
(Scotland) Aidan Smith	(Scotland) Annan Athletic	Free
(Scotland) Richard Murray	Free Agent	Free
(Scotland) Ayrton Sonkur	(Scotland) Annan Athletic	Free
(England) Cameron Copeland	Free Agent	Free
(England) James Atkinson	(Scotland) Annan Athletic	Free
(England) Lee Robinson	(Scotland) Dunfermline Athletic	Free
(Scotland) Ross Fergusson	(Scotland) Annan Athletic	Loan
(Scotland) James McFadden	Free Agent	Free
(Scotland) Callum Tapping	(Scotland) Brechin City	Free
(England) Jesse Akubuine	(Scotland) BSC Glasgow	Loan
(Scotland) Andy Stirling	(Scotland) Dumbarton	Loan
(Scotland) Ewan Gourlay	(Scotland) Dalbeattie Star	Loan

== See also ==
- List of Queen of the South F.C. seasons
