= Callum Fordyce =

Scottish footballer (born 1992)

Personal information
- Full name: Callum Fordyce
- Date of birth: 23 June 1992 (age 34)
- Place of birth: Livingston, Scotland
- Height: 5 ft 11 in (1.80 m)
- Position: Centre-back

Team information
- Current team: Raith Rovers
- Number: 5

Youth career
- 2007–2009: Hibernian
- 2009–2011: Livingston

Senior career*
Years	Team	Apps	(Gls)
2011–2015	Livingston	95	(7)
2013	→ Clyde (loan)	6	(0)
2015–2017	Dunfermline Athletic	19	(0)
2017–2019	Queen of the South	52	(3)
2019–2024	Airdrieonians	149	(9)
2024–	Raith Rovers	36	(2)
- * Club domestic league appearances and goals as of 4 May 2026

Callum Fordyce (born 23 June 1992) is a Scottish professional footballer who plays as a centre-back, and is a player for Scottish Championship club Raith Rovers. Fordyce started his career as a youth player with Hibernian and Livingston, before signing with the Lions on a permanent senior contract, before going on to play for Dunfermline Athletic and Queen of the South then Airdrieonians as a player/coach role. Fordyce also had a loan spell at Clyde whilst at the West Lothian club.

== Career ==
=== Livingston ===
Fordyce joined Livingston's youth system from Hibernian in 2009. A member of the Lions under-19s, Fordyce made his senior debut on 23 April 2011, playing from the start in a 4–2 win versus Airdrie United in the Scottish Second Division. Fordyce made two more appearances that season. Fordyce's next appearance was in the following season on 2 January 2011 as a substitute versus Falkirk in the Scottish First Division. On 15 March 2013, Fordyce moved to Clyde on a short-term loan deal and made six appearances in total. Fordyce extended his stay with Livingston by signing a new one-year contract in May 2013.

=== Dunfermline Athletic ===
In June 2015, after six years with Livingston, Fordyce signed for Scottish League One club Dunfermline Athletic and was appointed first-team captain by manager Allan Johnston. On 12 September 2015 in a match versus Scottish League One club Ayr United, Fordyce was injured in a tackle by Ayr striker Craig Moore, suffering a suspected broken leg. Fordyce was released by the Pars at the end of the 2016–17 season, as his contract expired.

=== Queen of the South ===
On 23 May 2017, Fordyce signed a one-year contract with fellow Scottish Championship club Queen of the South.

On 1 February 2018, Fordyce signed an extension to his contract to remain in Dumfries until May 2019.

=== Airdrieonians ===
On 30 May 2019, Fordyce signed a one-year contract with Scottish League One club Airdrieonians.

On 26 May 2022, Fordyce was named as player-assistant manager of Airdrieonians alongside player-manager Rhys McCabe. Fordyce played a key role in helping Airdrieonians gain promotion back to the Scottish Championship via the play-offs at the end of the 2022–23 season scoring in the play-off semi-final against Falkirk. Played in the Scottish Challenge Cup Final for Airdrieonians in their 2–1 victory over The New Saints at the Falkirk Stadium. On 26 May 2024, it was announced that Fordyce would leave the club upon expiry of his contract after 5 years at the club.

=== Raith Rovers ===
On 28 May 2024, Fordyce joined Scottish Championship club Raith Rovers on a two-year deal.

== Career statistics ==
As of match played 7th May 2024

Club Statistics
Club	Season	League			Scottish Cup		League Cup		Other		Total	
Club	Season	Division	Apps	Goals	Apps	Goals	Apps	Goals	Apps	Goals	Apps	Goals
Livingston	2010–11	Scottish Second Division	3	0	0	0	0	0	0	0	3	0
Livingston	2011–12	Scottish First Division	10	0	1	0	0	0	0	0	11	0
Livingston	2012–13	Scottish First Division	12	1	0	0	3	0	1 (Note: Appearances in the Scottish Challenge Cup)	0	16	1
Livingston	2013–14	Scottish Championship	35	4	1	0	3	1	1	0	40	5
Livingston	2014–15	Scottish Championship	35	2	1	0	3	0	5	1	44	3
Livingston	Total		95	7	3	0	9	1	7	1	114	9
Clyde (loan)	2012–13	Scottish Third Division	6	0	0	0	0	0	0	0	6	0
Dunfermline Athletic	2015–16	Scottish League One	6	0	0	0	2	0	2	0	10	0
Dunfermline Athletic	2016–17	Scottish Championship	13	0	1	0	0	0	2	0	16	0
Dunfermline Athletic	Total		19	0	1	0	2	0	4	0	26	0
Queen of the South	2017–18	Scottish Championship	29	3	3	0	4	0	4	0	40	3
Queen of the South	2018–19	Scottish Championship	23	0	3	0	5	0	2 (Note: One appearance in the Scottish Challenge Cup and one appearance in the Scottish Championship play-offs)	0	33	0
Queen of the South	Total		52	3	6	0	9	0	6	0	73	3
Airdrieonians	2019–20	Scottish League One	28	0	2	0	4	0	3	0	37	0
Airdrieonians	2020–21	Scottish League One	22	1	1	0	4	0	4 (Note: Appearances in the Championship play-offs)	0	31	1
Airdrieonians	2021–22	Scottish League One	32	2	2	0	4	0	5	0	43	2
Airdrieonians	2022-23	Scottish League One	34	3	1	0	4	0	5	1	43	4
Airdrieonians	2023-24	Scottish Championship	33	3	3	0	5	0	4 (Note: Three appearances in the Scottish Challenge Cup and one appearance in the Scottish Premiership play-offs.)	0	45	3
Total			149	9	9	0	21	0	21	1	200	10
Career total			321	19	19	0	41	1	37	2	418	22

== Personal life ==
Fordyce's cousin Rhys McCabe, is also a professional footballer; the two play together at Airdrieonians and previously played alongside each other at Dunfermline Athletic.

On 2 November 2018 Fordyce and his wife Zoe became parents for the first time when their daughter, Billie arrived weighing 8 pounds.

== Honours ==
=== Club ===
Livingston

- 2015 Scottish Challenge Cup

Dunfermline Athletic

- Scottish League One: 2015–16

Airdrieonians

- Scottish Championship play-offs: 2022–23
- Scottish Challenge Cup: 2023–24

Raith Rovers

- Scottish Challenge Cup: 2025–26
