= 2018–19 St Johnstone F.C. season =

St Johnstone
2018–19 season
- Chairman: Steve Brown
- Manager: Tommy Wright
- Stadium: McDiarmid Park; Perth, Scotland (Capacity: 10,696)
- Scottish Premiership: 7th
- Scottish Cup: Fifth round
- Scottish League Cup: Quarter finals
- Top goalscorer: League: Matty Kennedy (6); All: Tony Watt (8)
- Highest home attendance: League: 7,086 vs Rangers 23 December 2018; Cup: 5,635 vs Celtic; League Cup; 26 September 2018
- Lowest home attendance: League: 1,946 vs Livingston 23 January 2019; Cup: 1,687 vs East Fife; League Cup; 14 July 2018
- Average home league attendance: 3,938
Home colours	Away colours

The 2018–19 season was the club's sixth season in the Scottish Premiership and their tenth consecutive season in the top flight of Scottish football. St Johnstone also competed in the Scottish Cup and the League Cup, where they were knocked out of both by Celtic.

== Season summary ==
Tommy Wright remained as manager for the season. After getting through the Group stages of the League Cup (and losing to Kilmarnock in the first match of the season), Saints had a 4 match unbeaten run, although by the end of September they went on a 4 match win less run, which included being knocked out of the League Cup by Celtic. They were then unbeaten in the League through much of October, November and into December. They ended the year with a couple of home defeats and a couple of away wins. After losing to Hearts in league at the end of January however, the Saints went on an 8 match win less run, which included being knocked out of the Scottish Cup, again by Celtic. The win less run came to an end in a rearranged match at home to St. Mirren. They ended the regular season in seventh, therefore in the bottom six for the post-split for the second season in a row. Tony Watt announced he rejected a deal and would be leaving the club at the end of the season. The Saints finished the League season in Seventh place, claiming the best of the bottom six.

== Results and fixtures ==
Win Draw Loss Postponed

=== Pre-season ===
8 July 2018 Chris Millar Testimonial match	St Johnstone	2–2	Aberdeen	McDiarmid Park
14:00 BST	Wotherspoon 5'; Hurst 73'	Report	May 8'; Wright 28'	Attendance: 1,554; Referee: Alan Muir

10 July 2018 Friendly	Berwick Rangers	0–4	St Johnstone	Shielfield Park
19:30 BST		Report	Watt 8'; McMillan 11'; Craig 16'; McClean 68'	Referee: Gavin Ross

=== Scottish Premiership ===
5 August 2018 1	Kilmarnock	2–0	St Johnstone	Rugby Park
15:00	S. Boyd 59'; Ndjoli 85'	Report		Attendance: 4,644; Referee: John Beaton

12 August 2018 2	St Johnstone	1–1	Hibernian	McDiarmid Park
15:00	Watt 22'	Report	Shaw 51'	Attendance: 4,637; Referee: Willie Collum

25 August 2018 3	St Johnstone	1–0	Dundee	McDiarmid Park
15:00	Watt 51'	Report		Attendance: 4,259; Referee: Steven McLean

1 September 2018 4	Hamilton Academical	1–2	St Johnstone	New Douglas Park
	Bingham (yellow card) 29', (goal) 69'; McMann (yellow card) 36'	Report	Alston 37'; McMillan 45+1'; Clark (yellow card) 90'	Attendance: 1,791; Referee: Bobby Madden

15 September 2018 5	St Johnstone	1–1	Aberdeen	McDiarmid Park
15:00 BST	McMillan 13'; Craig (yellow card) 18'; Alston (yellow card) 66'; Swanson (yellow card) 89'	Report	Considine (yellow card) 47'; McGinn 69'; Lowe (yellow card) 70'	Attendance: 4,880; Referee: Willie Collum

23 September 2018 6	Rangers	5–1	St Johnstone	Ibrox Stadium
15:00 BST	Tavernier 9'; Morelos 34'; Arfield 52'; Lafferty 74'; Candeias 79'	Report	Foster (yellow card) 30'; Kerr (yellow card) 70'; Alston 77' (pen.)	Attendance: 48,729; Referee: Steven McLean

29 September 2018 7	Heart of Midlothian	2–1	St Johnstone	Tynecastle Park
15:00	Haring 25'; Dunne 65'	BBC Report	Callachan 77'	Attendance: 17,240; Referee: Nick Walsh

7 October 2018 8	St Johnstone	0–6	Celtic	McDiarmid Park
	Swanson (red card) 48'; Wotherspoon (yellow card) 75'; Anderson (yellow card) 77'	Report	Forrest 15', 30', 38', 45'; Édouard 22'; McGregor 84'	Attendance: 5,993; Referee: Kevin Clancy

20 October 2018 9	Motherwell	0–1	St Johnstone	Fir Park
15:00 BST	Bowman (yellow card) 63'; Hartley (yellow card) 85'	Report	Kerr 90+2'	Attendance: 3,752; Referee: Bobby Madden

27 October 2018 10	St Johnstone	2–0	St Mirren	McDiarmid Park
	Davidson (yellow card) 54'; Wotherspoon 60'; Kennedy 84', (yellow card) 85'	Report	Mullen (yellow card) 23'; S McGinn (yellow card) 72'; P McGinn (yellow card) 82'; Baird (yellow card) 85'	Attendance: 2,716; Referee: Andrew Dallas

31 October 2018 11	Livingston	0–1	St Johnstone	Almondvale Stadium
19:45 GMT	Pittman (yellow card) 33'; Menga (yellow card) 57'; Halkett (yellow card) 84'	Report	Kennedy 5'; Foster (yellow card) 21'; Tanser (yellow card) 90+2'	Attendance: 1,476; Referee: John Beaton

3 November 2018 12	Hibernian	0–1	St Johnstone	Easter Road
15:00 GMT	Stevenson (yellow card) 55'; Bartley (yellow card) 82'; McGregor (yellow card) 88'	Report	Shaughnessy 90'	Attendance: 17,307; Referee: Nick Walsh

10 November 2018 13	St Johnstone	4–0	Hamilton Academical	McDiarmid Park
	Davidson 20'; Wright 36'; Kennedy 54' (yellow card) 62'; Wotherspoon 74'	Report	Imrie (yellow card) 20'; McGowan (yellow card) 39'; Martin (yellow card) 51'; MacKinnon (yellow card) 76'	Attendance: 2,175; Referee: Steven McLean

24 November 2018 14	St Johnstone	0–0	Kilmarnock	McDiarmid Park
		Report	Taylor (yellow card) 61'	Attendance: 3,559; Referee: Willie Collum

2 December 2018 15 (Note: Match postponed due to Celtic involvement in League Cup Final. Re-scheduled for 30 Jan 19)	Celtic	P–P	St Johnstone	Celtic Park
15:00

5 December 2018 16	St Johnstone	2–2	Heart of Midlothian	McDiarmid Park
	Alston 20'; Wotherspoon (yellow card) 54'; Kennedy 69' (pen.); Craig (yellow card) 79'; Foster (yellow card) 90+3'	Report	Djoum 6'; Bozanic 41'; Haring (yellow card) 47'; Clare (yellow card) 61'; Berra (yellow card) 86'	Attendance: 3,040; Referee: Andrew Dallas

8 December 2018 17	Aberdeen	0–2	St Johnstone	Pittodrie Stadium
15:00 GMT	Shinnie (yellow card) 30'	Report	Craig (yellow card) 36'; Tanser (yellow card) 56'; Shaughnessy 71'; Alston 74'; Davidson (yellow card) 77'	Attendance: 13,304; Referee: Don Robertson

15 December 2018 18	St Johnstone	1–2	Motherwell	McDiarmid Park
15:00 GMT (UTC)	Kennedy (penalty missed) 26'; Watt (yellow card) 46'; Kerr 83'	Report	Aldred 2'; Johnson 17'; Dunne (yellow card) 26'; Campbell (yellow card) 44'; Main (yellow card) 82'; McHugh (yellow card) 90+5'	Attendance: 2,302; Referee: Alan Muir

23 December 2018 19	St Johnstone	1–2	Rangers	McDiarmid Park
12:15 GMT	Kennedy 45'; Craig (yellow card) 54'; Alston (yellow card) 87'; Watt (yellow card) 90+3'	Report	Goldson (yellow card) 62'; Morelos 65', 88' (yellow card) 89'	Attendance: 7,086; Referee: Nick Walsh

26 December 2018 20	St Mirren	0–1	St Johnstone	St Mirren Park
15:00 GMT		Report	Callachan (yellow card) 53'; Watt 89'	Attendance: 4,891; Referee: Kevin Clancy

29 December 2018 21	Dundee	0–2	St Johnstone	Dens Park
15:00 GMT	Boyle (yellow card) 64'; Woods (yellow card) 76'; Curran (yellow card) 81'	Report	Tanser 1'; Craig 58' (yellow card) 76'	Attendance: 6,868; Referee: Don Robertson

23 January 2019 22	St Johnstone	1–0	Livingston	McDiarmid Park
19:45 GMT	Foster (yellow card) 44'; Davidson 78' (yellow card) 88'; Wotherspoon (yellow card) 90'	Report	Halkett (yellow card) 30'; Pittman (yellow card) 68'	Attendance: 1,946; Referee: Andrew Dallas

26 January 2019 23	Heart of Midlothian	2–0	St Johnstone	Tynecastle Park
15:00	Godinho 52'; Morrison 90+1'; Djoum (yellow card) 68'	BBC Report	Callachan (yellow card) 26'; Foster (yellow card) 47'; Swanson (yellow card) 90+3'	Attendance: 16,672; Referee: Thomson

30 January 2019 15	Celtic	2–0	St Johnstone	Celtic Park
19:45	McGregor 53'; Christie 55'	Report		Attendance: 54,563; Referee: Greg Aitken

3 February 2019 24	St Johnstone	0–2	Celtic	McDiarmid Park
12:30		Report	Forrest 78'; Weah 89'	Attendance: 6,242; Referee: Willie Collum

6 February 2019 25	Hamilton Academical	2–1	St Johnstone	New Douglas Park
19:45	Oakley 68', 79'	Report	Craig 76'	Attendance: 1,174; Referee: Gavin Duncan

16 February 2019 26	Rangers	0–0	St Johnstone	Ibrox Stadium
15:00		Report		Attendance: 49,549; Referee: Steven McLean

23 February 2019 27	St Johnstone	0–2	Aberdeen	McDiarmid Park
15:00	Kane (yellow card) 32'; Kerr (yellow card) 71'; Foster (yellow card) 79'	Report	Shinnie 16', 75' (yellow card) 67'	Attendance: 5,092; Referee: Euan Anderson

27 February 2019 28	St Johnstone	1–2	Hibernian	McDiarmid Park
19:45 GMT	Kane 15'	BBC Sport	McNulty 65' (pen.), 84'	Attendance: 4,136; Referee: Gavin Duncan

9 March 2019 29	Livingston	3–1	St Johnstone	Almondvale Stadium
15:00	Halkett 38'; Sibbald 46', (yellow card) 62'; Pittman 90+2'	Report	Shaughnessy 14'; Goss (yellow card) 63'	Attendance: 1,615; Referee: John Beaton

16 March 2019 30	St Johnstone	P–P	St Mirren	McDiarmid Park
15:00 GMT		Report
Note: Match postponed due to a waterlogged pitch.

27 March 2019 30	St Johnstone	1–0	St Mirren	McDiarmid Park
19:45 GMT	Kane 13'	Report	Hladký (yellow card) 38'; Erhahon (red card) 88'	Attendance: 2,888; Referee: Steven McLean
Note: Rearranged match after postponement.

30 March 2019 31	Motherwell	3–0	St Johnstone	Fir Park
15:00 GMT	Frear 70'; Turnbull (yellow card) 80'; Aldred (yellow card) 87'; Tait 90+2'	Report	Craig (penalty missed) 14'; Davidson (yellow card) 29'	Attendance: 4,083; Referee: Euan Anderson

3 April 2019 32	St Johnstone	2–0	Dundee	McDiarmid Park
19:45 BST	Hendry 16'; Kennedy 60'; Callachan (yellow card) 90'	Report	O'Dea (yellow card) 13'	Attendance: 3,767; Referee: Greg Aitken

6 April 2019 33	Kilmarnock	2–0	St Johnstone	Rugby Park
15:00 BST	Kane 17' (o.g.); K. Boyd 43' (pen.); Power (yellow card) 74'	Report	Hendry (yellow card) 12'; Callachan (yellow card) 36'; Kerr (yellow card) 43' (yellow-red card) 68'; Foster (yellow card) 65'; Craig (yellow card) 73'	Attendance: 4,685; Referee: Bobby Madden

20 April 2019 34	St Johnstone	2–0	Dundee	McDiarmid Park
15:00 BST	Tanser 54'; Craig (yellow card) 61'; Hendry 68'	Report	O'Dea (yellow card) 53'; Curran (yellow card) 55'; McGowan (yellow card) 83'	Attendance: 3,946; Referee: Alan Muir

27 April 2019 35	St Mirren	1–1	St Johnstone	St Mirren Park
15:00 BST	Lyons (yellow card) 45+1'; Flynn (yellow card) 55'; Popescu (yellow card) 64'; Mullen 90'	Report	O'Halloran (yellow card) 32'; Davidson (yellow card) 33'; Tanser (yellow card) 54'; Kane 79'	Attendance: 5,213; Referee: Steven McLean

4 May 2019 36	St Johnstone	1–1	Livingston	McDiarmid Park
15:00	O'Halloran 4'	Report	Halkett (yellow card) 51' (goal) 84'; Gallagher (yellow card) 86'	Attendance: 2,222; Referee: David Munro

11 May 2019 37	St Johnstone	2–0	Motherwell	McDiarmid Park
15:00	Davidson (yellow card) 29'; Tanser 34' (pen.); Davidson 47'; Wotherspoon (yellow card) 90+2'	Report	Ariyibi (yellow card) 21'; Gillespie (yellow card) 34'; Aldred (yellow card) 70'	Attendance: 3,051; Referee: Colin Steven

18 May 2019 38	Hamilton Academical	2–0	St Johnstone	New Douglas Park
12:30	Gordon 11'; Davies 57'; McMann (yellow card) 72'; Martin (yellow card) 77'; MacKinnon (yellow card) 88'	Report	Craig (yellow card) 6'	Attendance: 2,553; Referee: Steven McLean

=== League Cup ===
14 July 2018 Group	St Johnstone	0–0 (5–4 p)	East Fife	McDiarmid Park
15:00		Report		Attendance: 1,687; Referee: Steven Kirkland
	Penalties
	Craig (penalty scored); Kane (penalty scored); Watt (penalty scored); Alston (penalty scored); Wright (penalty scored)		(penalty scored) Watson; (penalty scored) Court; (penalty scored) Slattery; (penalty scored) Davidson; (penalty missed) Thomson

21 July 2018 Group	Montrose	0–1	St Johnstone	Links Park
15:00		Report	Watt 34'	Attendance: 1,160; Referee: Barry Cook

24 July 2018 Group	St Johnstone	1–0	Falkirk	McDiarmid Park
19:45	Scougall 31'	Report		Attendance: 2,379; Referee: Craig Thomson

28 July 2018 Group	Forfar Athletic	1–3	St Johnstone	Station Park
15:00	Baird 15'	Report	Watt 42'; McMillan 51'; Kennedy 62'	Attendance: 1,087; Referee: Gavin Duncan

18 August 2018 Second Round	Queen of the South	2–4 (a.e.t.)	St Johnstone	Palmerston Park
15:00 BST	Dykes 45+1'; Dobbie 116' (pen.)	Report	Watt 27', 105'; Wright 95'; Hendry 120+1'	Attendance: 1,652; Referee: Don Robertson

26 September 2018 Quarter finals	St Johnstone	0–1	Celtic	McDiarmid Park
19:45		Report	Griffiths 83'; Tierney (yellow card) 86'; Boyata (red card) 90'	Attendance: 5,635; Referee: John Beaton

=== Scottish Cup ===
19 January 2019 Fourth round	St Johnstone	2–0	Hamilton Academical	McDiarmid Park
15:00	Kerr 1'; Watt 26'; Craig (yellow card) 55'	Report	Gogic (yellow card) 35'	Attendance: 2,363; Referee: John Beaton

10 February 2019 Fifth round	Celtic	5–0	St Johnstone	Celtic Park
13:30	Sinclair 3', 54', 89'; Brown 9'; Forrest 52'	Report		Attendance: 28,404; Referee: Nick Walsh
Note: Game televised on Premier Sports

== Squad statistics ==
=== Appearances ===
As of 18 May 2019

No.	Pos	Player	Premiership		League Cup		Scottish Cup		Total	
No.	Pos	Player	Apps	Goals	Apps	Goals	Apps	Goals	Apps	Goals
1	GK	(Scotland) Zander Clark	34	0	6	0	2	0	42	0
3	DF	(England) Scott Tanser	37	3	5	0	2	0	44	3
4	MF	(Scotland) Blair Alston	10+11	4	4+2	0	0	0	27	4
5	DF	(Republic of Ireland) Joe Shaughnessy (c)	32+1	3	2	0	2	0	37	3
7	FW	(England) Drey Wright	13+1	1	6	1	0	0	20	2
8	MF	(Scotland) Murray Davidson	26+2	2	5	0	1	0	34	2
9	FW	(Scotland) Chris Kane	14+16	3	0+2	0	2	0	34	3
10	MF	(Canada) David Wotherspoon	20+9	2	4	0	2	0	35	2
11	MF	(Scotland) Danny Swanson	6+17	0	0+1	0	0+1	0	25	0
12	GK	(Scotland) Cammy Bell	4	0	0	0	0	0	4	0
14	DF	(Scotland) Aaron Comrie	1	0	0	0	0	0	1	0
15	DF	(Scotland) Jason Kerr	37	2	5	0	2	1	44	3
17	MF	(Scotland) Michael O'Halloran	9+5	1	0	0	0	0	14	1
18	MF	(Scotland) Ali McCann	0+1	0	0+1	0	0	0	2	0
19	DF	(Scotland) Ricky Foster	37	0	6	0	2	0	45	0
20	MF	(Northern Ireland) Kyle McClean	0	0	0+2	0	0	0	2	0
22	FW	(England) Callum Hendry	5+7	2	0+2	1	0	0	14	3
23	DF	(Scotland) Liam Gordon	9+3	0	4	0	0	0	16	0
24	DF	(Scotland) Brian Easton	1	0	0	0	0	0	1	0
26	MF	(Scotland) Liam Craig	33+3	2	5	0	2	0	43	2
27	MF	(England) Sean Goss	6	0	0	0	1	0	7	0
28	MF	(Scotland) Ross Callachan	17+7	1	1	0	1+1	0	27	1
30	GK	(Scotland) Mark Hurst	0	0	0	0	0	0	0	0
31	DF	(Republic of Ireland) Niall Keown	0	0	0	0	0+1	0	1	0
32	FW	(Scotland) Tony Watt	22+7	3	5+1	4	1+1	1	37	8
33	MF	(Northern Ireland) Matty Kennedy	34+2	6	2+1	1	2	0	41	7
45	GK	(Scotland) Ross Sinclair	0	0	0	0	0	0	0	0
49	FW	(Scotland) Oliver Hamilton	0+1	0	0	0	0	0	1	0
50	MF	(Scotland) Jordan Northcott	0+1	0	0	0	0	0	1	0
Player who left the club during the season
6	DF	(Scotland) Steven Anderson	2+1	0	1	0	0	0	4	0
12	GK	(Northern Ireland) Conor Mitchell	0	0	0	0	0	0	0	0
16	FW	(Republic of Ireland) David McMillan	7+5	2	3+3	1	0+1	0	19	3
17	MF	(England) Tristan Nydam	1+4	0	0	0	0	0	5	0
21	MF	(Scotland) Stefan Scougall	0+1	0	2+3	1	0	0	6	1

== Team statistics ==
=== League table ===
Pos	Team	Pld	W	D	L	GF	GA	GD	Pts	Qualification or relegation (Note: Teams play each other three times (33 matches), before the league is split into two groups (the top six and the bottom six).)
5	Hibernian	38	14	12	12	51	39	+12	54	
6	Heart of Midlothian	38	15	6	17	42	50	−8	51	
7	St Johnstone	38	15	7	16	38	48	−10	52	
8	Motherwell	38	15	6	17	46	56	−10	51	
9	Livingston	38	11	11	16	42	44	−2	44	

Source: Soccerway BBC
Rules for classification: 1) Points; 2) Goal difference; 3) Goals scored; 4) Play-off (only if deciding champion, UEFA competitions qualification and second stage group allocation).

==== Group B table ====
Pos	Team	Pld	W	PW	PL	L	GF	GA	GD	Pts	Qualification	STJ	FAL	MON	FOR	EFI
1	St Johnstone (Q)	4	3	1	0	0	5	1	+4	11	Qualification for the Second round	—	1–0	—	—	p0–0
2	Falkirk	4	2	0	0	2	4	3	+1	6		—	—	0–1	2–0	—
3	Montrose	4	2	0	0	2	3	4	−1	6		0–1	—	—	—	1–0
4	Forfar Athletic	4	1	1	0	2	5	7	−2	5		1–3	—	3–1	—	—
5	East Fife	4	0	0	2	2	2	4	−2	2		—	1–2	—	1–1p	—

Rules for classification: 1) goal difference, 2) goals scored, 3) away goals scored, 4) matches won, 5) away matches won, 6) drawing of lots.
(Q) Qualified to the phase indicated

== Transfers ==
=== Players in ===
Date	Player	From	Fee
9 May 2018	(England) Drey Wright	(England) Colchester United	Free
9 July 2018	(Scotland) Tony Watt	Free Agent	Free
21 July 2018	(Northern Ireland) Matty Kennedy	(Wales) Cardiff City	Free
26 July 2018	(Northern Ireland) Conor Mitchell	(England) Burnley	Loan
26 July 2018	(England) Tristan Nydam	(England) Ipswich Town	Loan
31 August 2018	(Scotland) Ross Callachan	(Scotland) Heart of Midlothian	Free
19 January 2019	(Scotland) Michael O'Halloran	(Australia) Melbourne City	Free
29 January 2019	(Republic of Ireland) Niall Keown	(Scotland) Partick Thistle	Loan
31 January 2019	(Scotland) Cammy Bell	(Scotland) Partick Thistle	Loan
31 January 2019	(Germany) Sean Goss	(England) Queens Park Rangers	Loan

=== Players out ===
Date	Player	To	Fee
6 June 2018	(Scotland) Chris Millar	(Scotland) Greenock Morton	Free
21 June 2018	(Scotland) Keith Watson	(Scotland) Ross County	Free
1 July 2018	(Scotland) Steven MacLean	(Scotland) Heart of Midlothian	Free
1 July 2018	(Northern Ireland) Alan Mannus	(Republic of Ireland) Shamrock Rovers	Free
31 August 2018	(Scotland) Callum Hendry	(Scotland) Brechin City	Loan
29 January 2019	(Scotland) Steven Anderson	(Scotland) Partick Thistle	Loan
31 January 2019	(Republic of Ireland) David McMillan	(Scotland) Hamilton Academical	Loan
31 January 2019	(Scotland) Stefan Scougall	(England) Carlisle United	Free

== See also ==
- List of St Johnstone F.C. seasons
