= Joe Thomson (footballer) =

Scottish footballer (born 1997)

Personal information
- Full name: Joseph Alexander Thomson
- Date of birth: 14 January 1997 (age 29)
- Place of birth: Paisley, Scotland
- Position: Midfielder

Team information
- Current team: Glentoran
- Number: 6

Youth career
- 2006–2009: Rangers
- 2009–2015: Celtic

Senior career*
Years	Team	Apps	(Gls)
2015–2018	Celtic	1	(0)
2016	→ Dumbarton (loan)	18	(2)
2017	→ Queen of the South (loan)	17	(4)
2017	→ Livingston (loan)	2	(0)
2017–2018	→ Queen of the South (loan)	18	(5)
2018–2020	Dunfermline Athletic	38	(2)
2020–2023	Derry City	67	(9)
2023–2025	Larne	62	(11)
2025–	Glentoran	34	(6)

International career^{‡}
2011	Scotland U15	1	(0)
2012	Scotland U16	5	(0)
2013–2014	Scotland U17	9	(0)
2015	Scotland U18	2	(2)
2015–2016	Scotland U19	10	(0)
2017	Scotland U20	4	(0)
2017	Scotland U21	1	(0)
- * Club domestic league appearances and goals as of 29 April 2026 ‡ National team caps and goals as of 4 March 2019

Joseph Alexander Thomson (born 14 January 1997) is a Scottish professional footballer, who plays as a midfielder for NIFL Premiership side Larne. Thomson started his senior career at Celtic and he has played on loan at Dumbarton, Livingston, two spells at Queen of the South, Dunfermline Athletic and Derry City. Thomson has also been capped for Scotland at every age level from under-15 to under-21. He is one of only two Scottish players to score in both the Champions League and the Europa League

== Personal life ==
Thomson was born in Paisley and played for Gleniffer Thistle Boys Club. He was a youth signing with Rangers before switching to Celtic at under-12 level. He attended Williamwood High School then the Celtic school project at St Ninian's High School, Kirkintilloch.

== Club career ==
=== Celtic ===
Thomson played regularly for the Celtic Development Squad and featured in the first-team squad versus Villarreal C.F., PSV Eindhoven, FC Den Bosch, Stade Rennais and Sparta Prague who he scored against in the Maspalomas Cup. On 22 August 2015, Thomson made his first-team debut when he appeared as a substitute during the second half of Celtic's 3–1 victory at Tannadice versus Dundee United. He left Celtic at the end of the 2017–18 season.

=== Loan spells ===
Thomson joined Scottish Championship club Dumbarton in August 2016, for the first half of the season. He scored his first senior goal in a 2–2 draw with Dunfermline Athletic on 29 October 2016. Thomson departed the Sons on 31 December 2016, when his loan deal ended.

On 1 January 2017, Thomson subsequently joined fellow Scottish Championship club Queen of the South for the second half of the season, scoring on his debut against St Mirren on 7 January 2017. Thomson then returned to his parent club, Celtic at the end of the 2016–17 season.

At the start of August 2017, Thomson was sent out on loan to Livingston for six months to gain first-team experience, but was recalled back to his parent club in early September 2017, due to a disagreement between the clubs regarding the handling of the player, having only played three league matches for the West Lothian side.

On 29 December 2017, Thomson joined Queen of the South for a second spell on loan. He initially joined on an emergency loan deal, although he remained with the side until the end of the season. On 20 March 2018, Thomson scored twice in the club's first league victory at Tannadice since 1933, in a 3–2 win versus Dundee United.

=== Dunfermline Athletic ===
On 16 June 2018, Thomson signed for Scottish Championship club Dunfermline Athletic. He made his debut starting in a 3–0 win versus Peterhead in the Scottish League Cup on 17 July 2018, and scored his first goal in a league match against Dundee United on 4 August 2018. Thomson was voted Fans Player of the Year in his first season with Dunfermline. After missing part of his second season recovering from injury Thomson was released in May 2020 at the end of his contract along with 16 other players as COVID-19 impacted the clubs financial position.

=== Derry City ===
In June 2020, Thomson joined League of Ireland club Derry City on an initial 18 months contract and he scored in his Europa League debut. In November 2021 after winning the previous season's Supporters Player of the Year award Thomsons contract was extended for another 2 years.

Thomson won the 2022 FAI cup with Derry City.

=== Larne ===
Thomson signed for Larne on 6 January 2023 and made his debut away to Glentoran on 14 January 2023.

He made his first starting appearance for Larne on 17 January 2023 in a County Antrim Shield Final victory over Linfield.

== International career ==
Thomson was selected for the Scotland U17 team in the UEFA under-17 Championship in 2014, where the Netherlands beat them in the semi-finals.

He was selected for the under-20 squad in the 2017 Toulon Tournament. After a historic first ever win against Brazil, which was at any level. Scotland later won the bronze medal. It was the nations first ever medal at the competition.

In March 2017, Thomson made his debut for the Scotland Under-21 team in a friendly versus Estonia.

== Career statistics ==
As of 5 October 2021

Appearances and goals by club, season and competition
Club	Season	League			National Cup		League Cup		Other		Total	
Club	Season	Division	Apps	Goals	Apps	Goals	Apps	Goals	Apps	Goals	Apps	Goals
Celtic	2015–16	Scottish Premiership	1	0	0	0	0	0	0	0	1	0
Celtic	2016–17	Scottish Premiership	0	0	0	0	0	0	0	0	0	0
Celtic	2017–18	Scottish Premiership	0	0	0	0	0	0	0	0	0	0
Celtic	Total		1	0	0	0	0	0	0	0	1	0
Celtic U-23s	2016–17	SPFL Development League	—		—		—		3 (Note: Appearances in the Scottish Challenge Cup)	0	3	0
Dumbarton (loan)	2016–17	Scottish Championship	17	2	1	0	0	0	0	0	18	2
Queen of the South (loan)	2016–17	Scottish Championship	18	4	0	0	0	0	0	0	18	4
Livingston (loan)	2017–18	Scottish Championship	2	1	0	0	0	0	1	0	3	1
Queen of the South (loan)	2017–18	Scottish Championship	17	5	1	0	0	0	0	0	18	5
Dunfermline Athletic	2018–19	Scottish Championship	26	2	1	0	3	0	1	0	31	2
Dunfermline Athletic	2019–20	Scottish Championship	11	0	1	0	0	0	0	0	12	0
Dunfermline Athletic	Total		38	2	2	0	3	0	1	0	44	2
Derry City	2020	League of Ireland Premier Division	9	1	2	0	—		1 (Note: Appearances in the UEFA Europa League)	1	12	2
Derry City	2021	League of Ireland Premier Division	19	4	2	0	—		—		21	4
Derry City	Total		28	5	4	0	0	0	1	1	33	6
Career total			120	19	8	0	3	0	6	1	137	20

== Honours ==
Derry City

- FAI Cup 2022

Larne

- County Antrim Shield (2): 2022-23, 2023-24
- NIFL Premiership(2): 2022-23, 2023-24
- NIFL Charity Shield: 2024
