= Jason Kerr (footballer) =

Scottish footballer

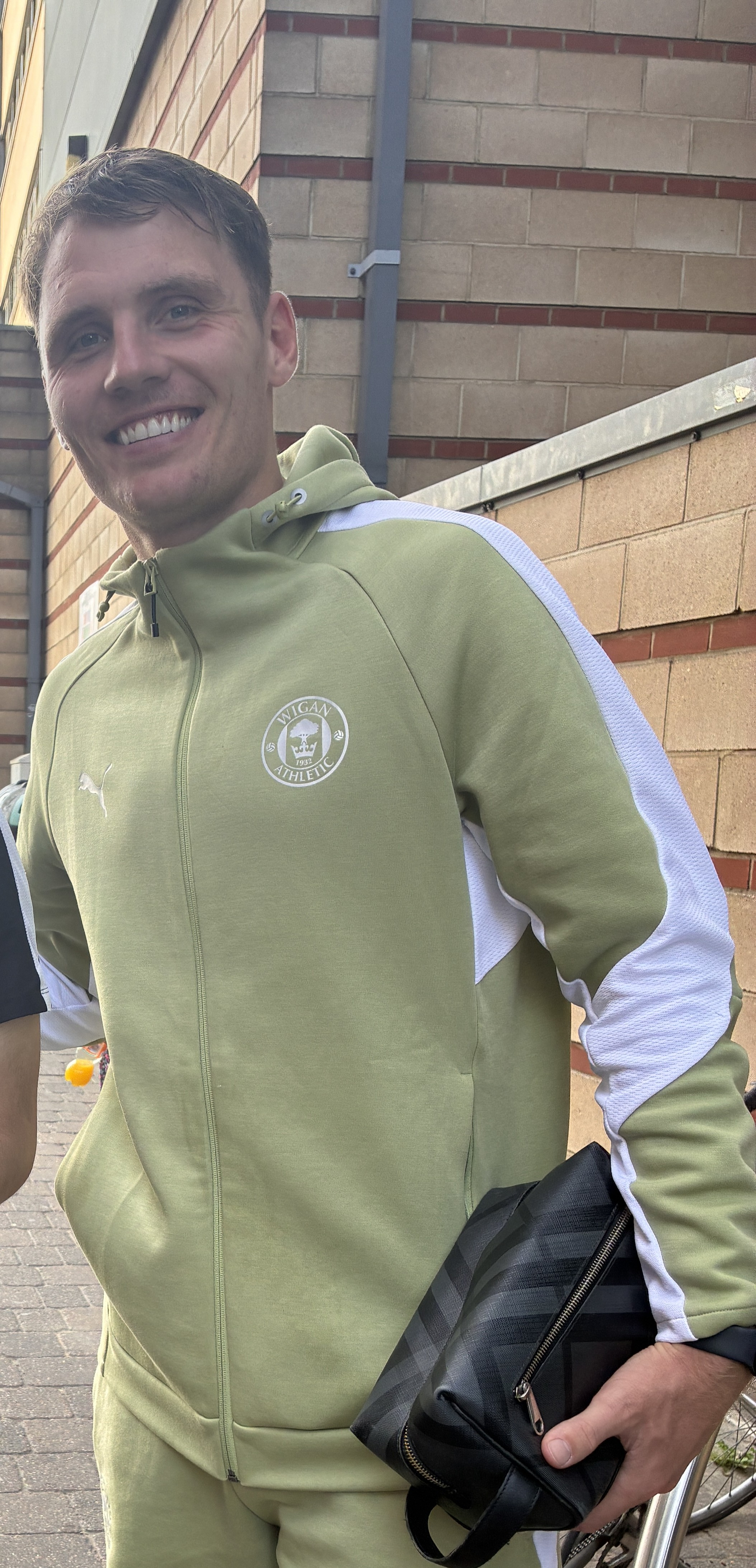
- Jason Kerr in 2025.

Personal information
- Full name: Jason John Kerr
- Date of birth: 6 February 1997 (age 29)
- Place of birth: Edinburgh, Scotland
- Height: 1.88 m (6 ft 2 in)
- Position: Defender

Team information
- Current team: Hibernian
- Number: 6

Youth career
- Penicuik Athletic
- Tynecastle
- St Johnstone

Senior career*
Years	Team	Apps	(Gls)
2014–2021	St Johnstone	113	(5)
2015–2017	→ East Fife (loan)	67	(11)
2017–2018	→ Queen of the South (loan)	18	(4)
2021–2026	Wigan Athletic	115	(5)
2026–	Hibernian	0	(0)

International career^{‡}
2018	Scotland U21	6	(0)
- * Club domestic league appearances and goals as of 30 December 2025 (UTC) ‡ National team caps and goals as of 4 March 2019

Jason John Kerr (born 6 February 1997) is a Scottish professional footballer who plays as a defender for Scottish Premiership club Hibernian.

== Career ==
Kerr started his career at St Johnstone in 2014, spending two seasons on loan at East Fife from 2015 to 2017, winning the Scottish League Two title in the 2015–16 season.

On 10 August 2017, Kerr, along with St Johnstone team-mate Chris Kane, joined Scottish Championship club Queen of the South on loan until 31 January 2018. On 21 October, Kerr scored the only goal at Glebe Park, Brechin in Queens 1–0 win over Brechin City and was subsequently sent-off in injury time with Ally Love of The City. However, Queens appealed the red card decision and this was overturned to a yellow card instead for unsporting behaviour.

On 14 January 2018, Kerr was recalled to the Perth club when his loan spell in Dumfries ended with the Doonhamers. Kerr made his debut appearance for St Johnstone on 29 January 2018, in a Scottish Cup fourth round 4–0 win against Albion Rovers at Cliftonhill.

Ahead of the 2019–20 season, Kerr was named as St Johnstone's club captain, following the departure of Joe Shaughnessy. He led the team to success in both the Scottish League Cup and Scottish Cup in 2020–21.

=== Wigan Athletic ===
On 31 August 2021, Kerr joined League One side Wigan Athletic on a three-year contract. During his first season at the club, Kerr featured in twenty-four league matches as Wigan Athletic were crowned champions.

In November 2022, Kerr was ruled out for the remainder of the season having suffered an anterior cruciate ligament injury during a 2–2 draw with Swansea City.

In January 2024, Kerr made his long-awaited return from injury, playing the duration of an EFL Trophy tie with Doncaster Rovers. Following the conclusion of the 2023–24 season, Kerr was offered a new contract. Despite strong reported interest from newly promoted Wrexham, as well as Peterborough United, he signed a new two-year deal on 4 June 2024.

On 6 May 2026 the club announced he would be leaving in the summer when his contract expired.

=== Hibernian ===
On 16 June 2026, Kerr joined Scottish Premiership side Hibernian on a two year deal, subject to SFA clearance.

== International career ==
Selected for the Scotland under-21 squad in the 2018 Toulon Tournament, the team lost to Turkey in a penalty-out and finished fourth.

== Career statistics ==
=== Club ===
As of match played 22 November 2025

Appearances and goals by club, season and competition
Club	Season	League			National cup (Note: Includes Scottish Cup and FA Cup)		League cup (Note: Includes Scottish League Cup and EFL Cup)		Continental		Other		Total	
Club	Season	Division	Apps	Goals	Apps	Goals	Apps	Goals	Apps	Goals	Apps	Goals	Apps	Goals
St Johnstone	2015–16	Scottish Premiership	0	0	0	0	0	0	0	0	—		0	0
St Johnstone	2016–17	Scottish Premiership	0	0	0	0	0	0	—		—		0	0
St Johnstone	2017–18	Scottish Premiership	15	1	2	0	0	0	0	0	—		17	1
St Johnstone	2018–19	Scottish Premiership	37	2	2	1	5	0	—		—		44	3
St Johnstone	2019–20	Scottish Premiership	29	1	3	0	4	0	—		—		36	1
St Johnstone	2020–21	Scottish Premiership	31	1	5	0	6	2	—		—		42	3
St Johnstone	2021–22	Scottish Premiership	3	0	—		1	0	4 (Note: Two appearances, one goal in UEFA Europa League; Two appearances in UEFA Europa Conference League)	1	—		8	1
St Johnstone	Total		115	5	12	1	16	2	4	1	—		147	9
East Fife (loan)	2015–16	Scottish League Two	34	3	2	0	0	0	—		0	0	36	3
East Fife (loan)	2016–17	Scottish League One	33	8	4	1	4	0	—		2 (Note: Appearance(s) in Scottish Challenge Cup)	0	43	9
Queen of the South (loan)	2017–18	Scottish Championship	18	4	0	0	—		—		1	1	19	5
Wigan Athletic	2021–22	League One	24	1	5	1	1	0	—		4 (Note: Appearance(s) in EFL Trophy)	0	34	2
Wigan Athletic	2022–23	Championship	16	0	0	0	0	0	—		—		16	0
Wigan Athletic	2023–24	League One	14	1	0	0	0	0	—		1	0	15	1
Wigan Athletic	2024–25	League One	44	1	4	0	0	0	—		0	0	48	1
Wigan Athletic	2025–26	League One	14	1	1	0	2	0	—		1	0	18	1
Wigan Athletic	Total		112	4	10	1	3	0	—		6	0	131	5
Career total			312	24	28	3	23	2	4	1	9	1	376	31

== Honours ==
East Fife

- Scottish League Two: 2015–16

St. Johnstone

- Scottish Cup: 2020–21
- Scottish League Cup: 2020–21

Wigan Athletic

- EFL League One: 2021–22

Individual

- SPFL Premiership Team of the Season: 2020–21
