= 2015–16 St Johnstone F.C. season =

St Johnstone
2015–16 season
- Chairman: Steve Brown
- Manager: Tommy Wright
- Stadium: McDiarmid Park
- Premiership: 4th
- Scottish Cup: Fourth round lost to Kilmarnock
- League Cup: Semi-final lost to Hibernian
- Europa League: First qualifying round, lost to Alashkert
- Top goalscorer: League: Steve MacLean (14); All: Steve MacLean (15)
- Highest home attendance: 6,418 vs Celtic; Scottish Premiership; 13 December 2015
- Lowest home attendance: 2,157 Inverness Caledonian Thistle; Scottish Premiership; 9 March 2016
- Average home league attendance: 3,880
Home colours	Away colours

The 2015–16 season was the club's third season in the Scottish Premiership and their seventh consecutive season in the top flight of Scottish football. St Johnstone also competed in the Europa League, League Cup and the Scottish Cup.

== Results ==
Win Draw Loss Postponed

=== Pre season friendlies ===
23 June 2015 Friendly	Linfield	1–2	St Johnstone	Belfast, Northern Ireland
19:45 GMT	Ross Clarke 80'	St Johnstone Report; Linfield Report	Sutton 10'; Shaughnessy 44'	Stadium: Windsor Park; Attendance: Behind closed doors

24 June 2015 Friendly	Glenavon	1–1	St Johnstone	Lurgan, County Armagh, Northern Ireland
19:45 GMT	Braniff 90' (pen.)	St Johnstone Report	Kane 72'	Stadium: Mourneview Park

28 June 2015 Friendly	St Johnstone	0–1	Aberdeen	Brechin
13:00 GMT		St Johnstone Report; Aberdeen Report	Rooney 71' (pen.)	Stadium: Glebe Park; Attendance: 1,248; Referee: Dallas

12 July 2015 Friendly	St Johnstone	0–0	Real Sociedad	Methil, Fife
13:30 GMT		St Johnstone Report		Stadium: Bayview Stadium; Attendance: Unknown; Referee: Beaton

25 July 2015 Friendly	St Johnstone	0–1	Blackpool	Tulloch
15:00 GMT		St Johnstone Report	McAlister	Stadium: McDiarmid Park; Attendance: 1,305; Referee: Salmond

=== Scottish Premiership ===
2 August 2015 Premiership	Heart of Midlothian	4–3	St Johnstone	Tynecastle Stadium
12:30	Juanma 4'; Walker 53'; Paterson 62'; Nicholson 80'	BBC Report	Lappin 56'; Sutton 75'; Cummins 78'	Attendance: 16,334; Referee: McLean

8 August 2015 Premiership	St Johnstone	1–1	Inverness Caledonian Thistle	McDiarmid Park
15:00	Cummins 90'	BBC Report	Christie 9'	Attendance: 2,959; Referee: Collum

11 August 2015 Premiership	St Johnstone	1–1	Ross County	McDiarmid Park
19:45	Cummins 52'	BBC Report	Curran 17'	Attendance: 3,065; Referee: Muir

15 August 2015 Premiership	Dundee	2–1	St Johnstone	Dens Park
15:00	McPake 16'; Hemmings 39'	BBC Report	MacLean 54'	Attendance: 6,176; Referee: Clancy

22 August 2015 Premiership	St Johnstone	2–1	Motherwell	McDiarmid Park
15:00	MacLean 62', 79'	BBC Report	Moult 11'; Taylor (yellow card) 86' (yellow-red card)	Attendance: 3,361; Referee: Thomson

29 August 2015 Premiership	Celtic	3–1	St Johnstone	Celtic Park
	Griffiths 18'; Rogić 45+1'; Mulgrew 67'	BBC Report	Boyata 11' (o.g.)	Attendance: 42,507; Referee: Beaton

12 September 2015 Premiership	St Johnstone	4–1	Hamilton Academical	McDiarmid Park
15:00	Craig 22'; MacLean 25' (pen.), 43', 54'	BBC Report	Tagliapietra 67'	Attendance: 2,648; Referee: Dallas

19 September 2015 Premiership	Kilmarnock	2–1	St Johnstone	Rugby Park
15:00	Magennis 40'; Easton 60' (Own goal)	BBC Report	Wotherspoon 17'	Attendance: 3,165; Referee: Collum

26 September 2015 Premiership	St Johnstone	2–1	Dundee United	McDiarmid Park
15:00	Mannus (red card) 23'; Cummins 63'; Lappin 80'	BBC Report	McKay 24' (pen.)	Attendance: 4,634; Referee: Madden

3 October 2015 Premiership	Aberdeen	1–5	St Johnstone	Pittodrie Stadium
15:00	Magennis 12'	BBC Report	Easton 5'; Shaughnessy 10'; Craig 30'; MacLean 47', 51'	Attendance: 13,405; Referee: Muir

17 October 2015 Premiership	St Johnstone	1–2	Partick Thistle	McDiarmid Park
15:00	MacLean 48'	BBC Report	Miller 28'; Lawless 34'	Attendance: 3414; Referee: Beaton

24 October 2015 Premiership	Inverness Caledonian Thistle	0–1	St Johnstone	Caledonian Stadium
15:00	Meekings (yellow card) 86'; Devine (yellow card) 90+4'	Report	Mackay (red card) 47'; Scobbie (yellow card) 66'; Craig 90+3' (pen.)	Attendance: 3,471; Referee: Robertson

31 October 2015 Premiership	Hamilton Academical	2–4	St Johnstone	New Douglas Park
15:00	Garcia Tena 81', 89' (pen.)	BBC Report	Cummins 40', 49'; Wotherspoon 63'; O'Halloran 67'	Attendance: 2,216; Referee: Clancy

7 November 2015 Premiership	St Johnstone	2–1	Kilmarnock	McDiarmid Park
15:00	O'Halloran 23'; Kane 49'; Craig (red card) 86'	BBC Report	Smith 2'	Attendance: 3,475; Referee: Allan

21 November 2015 Premiership	Dundee United	1–2	St Johnstone	Tannadice Park
15:00	McKay 33'	BBC Report	Kane 43'; Davidson 45+1'	Attendance: 7,020; Referee: Thomson

27 November 2015 Premiership	St Johnstone	1–1	Dundee	McDiarmid Park
15:00	Wotherspoon 13'	BBC Report	Hemmings 3'	Attendance: 4,598; Referee: Muir

5 December 2015 Premiership	Ross County	2–3	St Johnstone	Victoria Park
15:00	Boyce 68'; Davidson 88' (Own goal)	BBC Report	Wotherspoon 3', 43'; Mackay 88'	Attendance: 3,229; Referee: Clancy

13 December 2015 Premiership	St Johnstone	0–3	Celtic	McDiarmid Park
15:00		BBC Report	Çiftçi 35', 67'; Boyata 49'	Attendance: 6,418; Referee: Allan

19 December 2015 Premiership	St Johnstone	0–0	Heart of Midlothian	McDiarmid Park
15:00		BBC Report	Juanma (red card) 28'	Attendance: 4,780; Referee: Clancy

26 December 2015 Premiership	Partick Thistle	P–P	St Johnstone	Firhill Stadium
15:00		BBC Report		Referee: Beaton
Note: Postponed due to a waterlogged pitch.

30 December 2015 Premiership	Motherwell	2–0	St Johnstone	Fir Park
	Hall 38'; Pearson 45'	BBC Report		Attendance: 4,055; Referee: Allan

3 January 2016 Premiership	St Johnstone	P–P	Aberdeen	McDiarmid Park
15:00		BBC Report		Referee: Madden

16 January 2016 Premiership	St Johnstone	0–0	Hamilton Academical	McDiarmid Park
15:00		BBC Report		Attendance: 2,685; Referee: Dallas

23 January 2016 Premiership	Celtic	3–1	St Johnstone	Celtic Park
	Mackay-Steven 9', 55'; Armstrong 43'	BBC Report	MacLean 12'	Attendance: 43,948; Referee: Kevin Clancy

6 February 2016 Premiership	St Johnstone	3–4	Aberdeen	McDiarmid Park
15:00	Wotherspoon 52'; Anderson 79'; Scobbie 89'	BBC Report	Rooney 5', 77'; Pawlett 20'; McGinn 71'	Attendance: 5,712; Referee: Don Robertson

12 February 2016 Premiership	Dundee	2–0	St Johnstone	Dens Park
19:45	Hemmings 21' 51'; O'Dea (yellow card) 66'; Stewart (yellow card) 90'	Report	Fisher (yellow card) 58'; Cummins (yellow card) 66'; Davidson (yellow card) 76'; Swanson (yellow card) 76'	Attendance: 4,876; Referee: (Scotland) Craig Thomson (referee)

20 February 2016 Premiership	St Johnstone	2–1	Motherwell	McDiarmid Park
15:00	Wotherspoon 43'; Fisher (yellow card) 60'; Scobbie (yellow card) 84' (goal) 90+1'		Moult 33'; Hall (yellow card) 90'	Attendance: 3,006; Referee: (Scotland) Bobby Madden

23 February 2016 Premiership	Partick Thistle	2–0	St Johnstone	Firhill Stadium
19:45	Doolan 72'; Amoo 87'	Report	Anderson (yellow card) 75'; Wotherspoon (yellow card) 90'	Attendance: 2,320; Referee: (Scotland) John Beaton

27 February 2016 Premiership	Aberdeen	1–1	St Johnstone	Pittodrie Stadium
15:00	Church 35'; Jack (yellow card) 41'; Shinnie (yellow card) 80'	Report	Brown (yellow card) 7'; Wotherspoon (yellow card) 17'; Swanson (yellow card) 41'; Craig 88' (pen.); Kane (yellow card) 90'	Attendance: 12,563; Referee: (Scotland) Steven McLean (referee)

2 March 2016 Premiership	St Johnstone	1–2	Partick Thistle	McDiarmid Park
19:45	Kane 67'; Craig (yellow card) 90'	Report	Booth 6'; Lawless 13'; Welsh (yellow card) 42'	Attendance: 2,569; Referee: (Scotland) Craig Thomson (referee)

9 March 2016 Premiership	St Johnstone	1–0	Inverness Caledonian Thistle	McDiarmid Park
19:45	Kane 84'	Report	Warren (yellow card) 35' (yellow-red card); Tansey (yellow card) 90'; Vigurs (yellow card) 90'	Attendance: 2,157; Referee: (Scotland) Don Robertson

16 March 2016 Premiership	St Johnstone	1–1	Ross County	McDiarmid Park
19:45	Wotherspoon 11'; Lappin (yellow card) 66'	Report	Graham 65' (pen.)	Attendance: 2,501; Referee: (Scotland) Steven McLean (referee)

19 March 2016 Premiership	Heart of Midlothian	0–3	St Johnstone	Tynecastle Stadium
15:00	Augustyn (yellow card) 26'	Report	Davidson 11' 21'; Fisher (yellow card) 52' (goal) 88'	Attendance: 16,295; Referee: (Scotland) Craig Thomson (referee)

2 April 2016 Premiership	St Johnstone	0–1	Dundee United	McDiarmid Park
15:00			Dow 22'; Morris (yellow card) 25'; Donaldson (red card) 60'	Attendance: 5,784; Referee: (Scotland) Willie Collum

9 April 2016 Premiership	Kilmarnock	3–0	St Johnstone	Rugby Park
15:00	O'Hara (yellow card) 16'; Kiltie (yellow card) 23'; Boyd 25' 88' (pen.); Magennis (yellow card) 33'; Higginbotham 65'; Addison (yellow card) 78'	Report	Fisher (yellow card) 23'	Attendance: 3,693; Referee: (Scotland) Crawford Allan

22 April 2016 Premiership	St Johnstone	3–0	Aberdeen	McDiarmid Park
19:45	Wotherspoon 14'; MacLean 38'; Craig 55'	Report	Hayeas (yellow card) 65'; Shinnie (yellow card) 84'	Attendance: 3,990; Referee: (Scotland) Craig Thomson (referee)

30 April 2016 Premiership	Ross County	0–1	St Johnstone	Global Energy Stadium
15:00	Quinn (yellow card) 33'	Report	Craig (yellow card) 25'; MacLean 56'; Shaughnessy (yellow card) 88'	Attendance: 3,329; Referee: (Scotland) Stephen Finnie

7 May 2016 Premiership	Motherwell	1–2	St Johnstone	Fir Park
15:00	McDonald 4'; Pearson (yellow card) 67'; Leitch (yellow card) 89'	Report	MacLean 34'; Darnell Fisher (yellow card) 39'; Swanson 45'	Attendance: 4,441; Referee: (Scotland) Greg Aitken

11 May 2016 Premiership	St Johnstone	2–1	Celtic	McDiarmid Park
19:30	Anderson (yellow card) 35'; MacLean 56' (yellow card) 57'; Swanson (yellow card) 61'; Cummins 77'	Report	Johansen (yellow card) 28'; Griffiths 53'	Attendance: 5,959; Referee: (Scotland) Willie Collum

15 May 2016 Premiership	Heart of Midlothian	2–2	St Johnstone	Tynecastle Stadium
12:30	Scouttar (yellow card) 8'; Öztürk (yellow card) 13'; Djoum 17' (yellow card) 58'; Shaughnessy 20' (o.g.); Oshaniwa (yellow card) 29'; Dauda (red card) 57'; Juanma (yellow card) 60'	Report	Craig 9' (pen.) (yellow card) 66'; Cummins 12'; Kane (yellow card) 56'; Darnell Fisher (yellow card) 59'; Scobbie (yellow card) 74'	Attendance: 16,046; Referee: (Scotland) Greg Aitken

=== UEFA Europa League ===
==== Qualifying phase ====
2 July 2015 First qualifying round 1st leg	Alashkert (Armenia)	1–0	St Johnstone	Yerevan, Armenia
17:00 CET	Manasyan 59'	BBC; UEFA		Stadium: Vazgen Sargsyan Republican Stadium; Attendance: 2,600; Referee: Kehlet

9 July 2015 First qualifying round 2nd leg	St Johnstone	2–1 (2–2 agg.)	(Armenia) Alashkert; Alashkert won on away goals	Perth, Scotland
19:45	O'Halloran 34'; McKay 87'	BBC; UEFA	Muradyan (yellow card) 11' (yellow-red card); Goyozalyan 74'	Stadium: McDiarmid Park; Attendance: 5,764; Referee: Fautrel

=== League Cup ===
22 September 2015 League Cup third round	Rangers	1–3	St Johnstone	Ibrox Stadium
19:15	Tavernier 62'	BBC Report	Davidson 19'; Lappin 29'; O'Halloran 46'	Attendance: 27,094; Referee: Clancy

27 October 2015 Quarter Final	Greenock Morton	1–3	St Johnstone	Cappielow
19:30	Johnstone 52'	BBC Report	MacLean 61' (pen.); O'Halloran 63'; Kane 83'	Attendance: 2,433; Referee: Thomson

30 January 2016 Semi Final	Hibernian	2–1	St Johnstone	Tynecastle
15:00	Cummings 29' (pen.); McGinn 74'	BBC Report	Shaughnessy 33'	Attendance: 16,971; Referee: McLean

=== Scottish Cup ===
9 January 2016 Scottish Cup round 4	St Johnstone	0–1	Kilmarnock	McDiarmid Park
15:00		BBC Report	Slater 6'	Attendance: 3,147; Referee: Clancy

== Squad statistics ==
During the 2015–16 season, St Johnstone have used twenty-four different players in competitive games. The table below shows the number of appearances and goals scored by each player.

=== Appearances ===
As of 6 February 2016

No.	Pos	Nat	Player	Total		Premiership		League Cup		Scottish Cup		Europa League	
No.	Pos	Nat	Player	Apps	Goals	Apps	Goals	Apps	Goals	Apps	Goals	Apps	Goals
1	GK	(Northern Ireland) NIR	Alan Mannus	28	0	22+0	0	3+0	0	1+0	0	2+0	0
2	DF	(Scotland) SCO	Dave Mackay	20	1	17+0	1	2+0	0	1+0	0	0+0	0
3	DF	(Scotland) SCO	Tam Scobbie	21	1	15+1	1	2+1	0	0+0	0	2+0	0
4	MF	(Scotland) SCO	Simon Lappin	17	3	8+5	2	3+0	1	0+0	0	1+0	0
5	DF	(Scotland) SCO	Frazer Wright	2	0	1+0	0	0+0	0	0+0	0	1+0	0
6	DF	(Scotland) SCO	Steven Anderson	16	1	11+1	1	2+0	0	1+0	0	1+0	0
7	MF	(Scotland) SCO	Chris Millar	16	0	13+0	0	2+0	0	1+0	0	0+0	0
8	MF	(Scotland) SCO	Murray Davidson	25	2	20+0	1	3+0	1	1+0	0	1+0	0
9	FW	(Scotland) SCO	Steven MacLean	26	11	18+2	10	3+0	1	1+0	0	2+0	0
10	MF	(Scotland) SCO	David Wotherspoon	25	6	17+3	6	2+1	0	1+0	0	1+0	0
11	FW	(England) ENG	John Sutton	20	1	5+11	1	0+1	0	0+1	0	2+0	0
12	GK	(Scotland) SCO	Zander Clark	2	0	1+1	0	0+0	0	0+0	0	0+0	0
14	DF	(Ireland) EIR	Joe Shaughnessy	28	2	20+2	1	3+0	1	1+0	0	2+0	0
15	DF	(Scotland) SCO	Brad McKay	4	1	2+0	0	0+0	0	0+0	0	1+1	1
16	MF	(Scotland) SCO	Liam Caddis	6	0	0+5	0	0+0	0	0+0	0	0+1	0
16	MF	(Scotland) SCO	Danny Swanson	1	0	1+0	0	0+0	0	0+0	0	0+0	0
18	FW	(Ireland) EIR	Graham Cummins	21	6	15+2	6	1+1	0	0+1	0	0+1	0
20	MF	(Scotland) SCO	Scott Brown	3	0	0+1	0	0+0	0	0+0	0	1+1	0
22	DF	(England) ENG	Darnell Fisher	10	0	9+1	0	0+0	0	0+0	0	0+0	0
24	DF	(Scotland) SCO	Brian Easton	28	1	20+2	1	3+0	0	1+0	0	2+0	0
25	FW	(Scotland) SCO	Chris Kane	20	3	3+13	2	0+1	1	1+0	0	1+1	0
26	MF	(Scotland) SCO	Liam Craig	24	3	15+6	3	1+2	0	0+0	0	0+0	0
27	MF	(Scotland) SCO	Craig Thomson	7	0	1+5	0	0+0	0	0+1	0	0+0	0
29	FW	(Scotland) SCO	Michael O'Halloran	26	5	19+1	2	3+0	2	1+0	0	2+0	1
31	MF	(Scotland) SCO	Greg Hurst	1	0	0+1	0	0+0	0	0+0	0	0+0	0

=== Disciplinary record ===
As of 6 February 2016

Number	Nation	Position	Name	Premiership		League Cup		Scottish Cup		Europa League		Total	
Number	Nation	Position	Name	Yellow card	Red card	Yellow card	Red card	Yellow card	Red card	Yellow card	Red card	Yellow card	Red card
1	(Northern Ireland)	GK	Alan Mannus	1	1	0	0	0	0	0	0	1	1
2	(Scotland)	DF	Dave Mackay	1	1	0	0	0	0	0	0	1	1
3	(Scotland)	DF	Tam Scobbie	2	0	0	0	0	0	1	0	3	0
4	(Scotland)	MF	Simon Lappin	1	0	2	0	0	0	0	0	3	0
5	(Scotland)	DF	Frazer Wright	0	0	0	0	0	0	1	0	1	0
6	(Scotland)	DF	Steven Anderson	1	0	0	0	0	0	1	0	2	0
7	(Scotland)	MF	Chris Millar	2	0	0	0	0	0	0	0	2	0
8	(Scotland)	MF	Murray Davidson	6	0	2	0	1	0	0	0	8	0
9	(Scotland)	MF	Steve MacLean	2	0	0	0	0	0	0	0	2	0
10	(Scotland)	MF	David Wotherspoon	6	0	0	0	0	0	0	0	6	0
14	(Republic of Ireland)	DF	Joe Shaughnessy	1	0	1	0	0	0	0	0	2	0
15	(Scotland)	DF	Brad McKay	0	0	0	0	0	0	1	0	1	0
16	(Scotland)	MF	Liam Caddis	1	0	0	0	0	0	0	0	1	0
16	(Scotland)	MF	Danny Swanson	1	0	0	0	0	0	0	0	1	0
22	(England)	DF	Darnell Fisher	3	0	0	0	0	0	0	0	3	0
24	(Scotland)	DF	Brian Easton	4	0	0	0	0	0	0	0	4	0
26	(Scotland)	MF	Liam Craig	4	1	0	0	0	0	0	0	4	1
29	(Scotland)	FW	Michael O'Halloran	2	0	0	0	0	0	0	0	2	0
			Totals	38	3	5	0	1	0	4	0	48	3

=== Goal scorers ===
As of 6 February 2016

Ranking	Nation	Number	Name	Scottish Premiership	League Cup	Scottish Cup	Europa League	Total
1	(Scotland)	9	Steve MacLean	10	1	0	0	11
2	(Republic of Ireland)	18	Graham Cummins	6	0	0	0	6
2	(Scotland)	10	David Wotherspoon	6	0	0	0	6
3	(Scotland)	29	Michael O'Halloran	2	2	0	1	5
4	(Scotland)	4	Simon Lappin	2	1	0	0	3
4	(Scotland)	26	Liam Craig	3	0	0	0	3
4	(Scotland)	25	Chris Kane	2	1	0	0	3
5	(Scotland)	8	Murray Davidson	1	1	0	0	2
5	(Scotland)	14	Brad McKay	1	0	0	1	2
5	(Republic of Ireland)	14	Joe Shaughnessy	1	1	0	0	2
6	(England)	11	John Sutton	1	0	0	0	1
6	(Scotland)	24	Brian Easton	1	0	0	0	1
6	(Scotland)	6	Steven Anderson	1	0	0	0	1
6	(Scotland)	3	Tam Scobbie	1	0	0	0	1
			Totals	38	7	0	2	46

== Team statistics ==
=== League table ===
Pos	Team	Pld	W	D	L	GF	GA	GD	Pts	Qualification or relegation (Note: Teams play each other three times (33 matches), before the league is split into two groups (the top six and the bottom six).)
2	Aberdeen	38	22	5	11	62	48	+14	71	Qualification for the Europa League first qualifying round
3	Heart of Midlothian	38	18	11	9	59	40	+19	65	Qualification for the Europa League first qualifying round
4	St Johnstone	38	16	8	14	58	55	+3	56	
5	Motherwell	38	15	5	18	47	63	−16	50	
6	Ross County	38	14	6	18	55	61	−6	48	

Source: Scottish Premiership, Soccerway (first phase), Soccerway (second phase)
Rules for classification: 1) Points; 2) Goal difference; 3) Goals scored; 4) Play-off (only if deciding champion, UEFA competitions qualification and second stage group allocation).

== Transfers ==
=== In ===
Player	From	Fee
(Scotland) Brad McKay	(Scotland) Heart of Midlothian	Free
(Republic of Ireland) Joe Shaughnessy	(Scotland) Aberdeen	Free
(Republic of Ireland) Graham Cummins	(England) Exeter City	Free
(England) John Sutton	(Scotland) Motherwell	Free
(Scotland) Liam Craig	(Scotland) Hibernian	Free
(England) Darnell Fisher	(Scotland) Celtic	Loan
(Scotland) Greg Hurst	(Scotland) Stirling Albion	Undisclosed
(Scotland) Danny Swanson	(Scotland) Heart of Midlothian	Free
(Scotland) Michael Doyle	(Scotland) Alloa Athletic	Free

=== Out ===
Player	From	Fee
(Scotland) Gary Miller	(Scotland) Partick Thistle	Free
(England) Lee Croft	(England) Oldham Athletic	Free
(Scotland) James McFadden		Free
(Scotland) Matthew Buchanan		Free
(Scotland) Rhys Evans		Free
(Scotland) Mark Hurst	(Scotland) Elgin City	Loan
(Scotland) Liam Gordon	(Scotland) Elgin City	Loan
(Scotland) George Hunter	(Scotland) Elgin City	Loan
(Scotland) Ally Gilchrist	(Scotland) Peterhead	Loan
(Scotland) Jason Kerr	(Scotland) East Fife	Loan
(Scotland) Jordan Millar	(Scotland) Montrose	Loan
(Scotland) Dylan Easton		Free
(Scotland) Frazer Wright	(Scotland) Dumbarton	Free
(Scotland) Connor McLaren	(Scotland) Elgin City	Loan
(Scotland) George Hunter	(Scotland) Airdrieonians	Loan
(Scotland) Brad McKay	(Scotland) Dunfermline Athletic	Loan
(Scotland) Michael O'Halloran	(Scotland) Rangers	Undisclosed
(Scotland) Liam Caddis		Free

== See also ==
- List of St Johnstone F.C. seasons
