= Ross Fergusson =

Scottish footballer (born 1997)

Personal information
- Date of birth: 1 April 1997 (age 29)
- Place of birth: Dumfries, Scotland
- Position: Striker

Team information
- Current team: Annan Athletic

Youth career
- 2005–2009: Heston Rovers
- 2009–2015: Queen of the South

Senior career*
Years	Team	Apps	(Gls)
2016–2018	Queen of the South	14	(1)
2017–2018	→ Annan Athletic (loan)	6	(1)
2018–	Annan Athletic	20	(3)
- * Club domestic league appearances and goals as of 17:12, 29 April 2019 (UTC)

Ross Fergusson (born 1 April 1997) is a retired Scottish professional footballer, who plays as a striker for Annan Athletic. Fergusson has previously played for Queen of the South.

== Career ==
After leaving Heston Rovers, Fergusson joined the Queen of the South under 20's development squad, where he played until the end of May 2015. Fergusson made his first-team debut for Queens on 15 October 2016 versus Greenock Morton, appearing as a substitute in a 5–0 defeat.

On 24 November 2017, Fergusson joined Annan Athletic on an emergency loan until 31 December 2017. Fergusson played in six league matches and scored one goal for the Galabankies before returning to the Doonhamers on 4 January 2018.

On 20 January 2018, Fergusson scored his first goal for Queens at Palmerston Park in a 2–1 defeat versus Partick Thistle in the fourth round of the Scottish Cup.

On 8 May 2018, Fergusson extended his contract to remain with the Palmerston club until the end of the 2018-19 season.

On 4 July 2018, Fergusson was released from his contract with Queen of the South by mutual consent.

On 21 July 2018, Fergusson signed a one-year contract with Annan Athletic.

== Career statistics ==
Appearances and goals by club, season and competition
Club	Season	League			Scottish Cup		League Cup		Other		Total	
Club	Season	Division	Apps	Goals	Apps	Goals	Apps	Goals	Apps	Goals	Apps	Goals
Queen of the South	2016–17	Scottish Championship	6	0	0	0	0	0	0	0	6	0
Queen of the South	2017–18	Scottish Championship	8	0	2	1	0	0	0	0	10	1
Queen of the South	Total		14	0	2	1	0	0	0	0	16	1
Annan Athletic (loan)	2017–18	Scottish League Two	6	1	—		—		—		6	1
Annan Athletic	2018–19	Scottish League Two	21	1	3	0	1	0	3 (Note: Two appearances, three goals in Scottish Challenge Cup; One appearance in Scottish League One play-offs)	3	28	4
Career total			41	2	5	1	1	0	3	3	50	6
