= David Martindale =

Scottish football manager

Personal information
- Full name: David Paul Martindale
- Date of birth: 13 July 1974 (age 52)
- Place of birth: Govan, Glasgow, Scotland

Team information
- Current team: Livingston (Sporting Director / co-interim manager)

Youth career
- Rangers
- Motherwell

Senior career*
Years	Team	Apps	(Gls)
- Linlithgow Rose
- West Calder United
2010–2011	Whitburn		

Managerial career
- 2020–2026: Livingston
- 2026–: Livingston (co-interim)
- * Club domestic league appearances and goals

David Paul Martindale (born 13 July 1974) is a Scottish football manager who is currently the Sporting Director and interim manager at Scottish Championship club Livingston.

Martindale played at Junior level following his release from prison for organised crime. From 2014, he has worked in various capacities at Livingston becoming an increasingly important figure in its structure, before being appointed manager in 2020. Martindale would remain in the role until February 2026, before returning on an interim basis in September 2026.

== Career ==
=== Time in prison, first steps in coaching ===
Unlike most football managers, Martindale did not play at professional level. Born in Glasgow, he grew up in Govan and the Craigshill neighbourhood of Livingston in West Lothian. He was a promising youth player with Rangers and Motherwell but by his own admission did not apply himself to make the most of his talents, and was released from a contract with Rangers after fracturing his leg in an unauthorised local match with friends. He played at Junior level for Linlithgow Rose and West Calder United and had business interests in the hospitality sector.

After a pub he owned caught fire without insurance cover he became heavily involved in organised crime, specifically the large-scale supply of cocaine as well as money laundering. He was arrested in April 2004 following a police operation; while awaiting trial, he studied a degree in construction project management at Heriot-Watt University.

Martindale was imprisoned in November 2006, serving four years. He also had around £100,000-worth of assets seized as proceeds of crime and completed his degree following his release. In football, he played for Whitburn in the East Region Juniors league before becoming assistant manager at Broxburn Athletic.

=== Progression at Livingston ===
In 2014, while employed in the construction industry, he became involved with Livingston as a part-time volunteer based on personal recommendations and following appropriate background checks with his work initially consisting of basic training duties and ground maintenance. The club's poor financial state at the time meant they were in need of assistance at minimal cost.

Even at that stage, his appointment was scrutinised in local press. He gradually became more involved in coaching and recruitment during Mark Burchill's spell as manager. He began to study coaching formally, obtaining his UEFA B Licence via the Irish Football Association, due to them being more accommodating to applicants with convictions than their Scottish counterparts.

Martindale was appointed assistant manager of Livingston when David Hopkin became manager in January 2016. When Hopkin departed in May 2018 after leading the club to successive promotions from Scottish League One to the Scottish Premiership, he took temporary charge of the team.

Martindale was offered the manager's job but turned it down because of concerns about bringing embarrassment to the club and being inexperienced. Following the resignation of Kenny Miller in August 2018, he had interim control for a matter of days before Gary Holt took over. Holt kept Martindale on the staff and handed him increased responsibilities as 'director of football operations'.

=== Livingston manager ===
Holt quit as Livingston manager in November 2020 and Martindale was appointed head coach on an interim basis, alongside Tony Caig. He won four matches, including a 2020–21 Scottish League Cup quarter-final, and was officially appointed manager until the end of the season on 21 December.

Under Martindale, the club went on to win four subsequent Premiership matches, before securing draws against title holders Celtic and progressing to the Scottish League Cup final. They would be narrowly beaten by St Johnstone.

The Scottish Football Association's 'fit and proper person' hearing by its Professional Game Board took place on 26 January 2021 with a positive outcome for Martindale, who had been turned down in his application to be a club official a year earlier. He was supported publicly by eminent sporting academic Phil Scraton and local MP Hannah Bardell. There was also widespread support for Martindale within Scottish football from fans, players and other managers.

Martindale won Scottish Premiership Manager of the Month in November 2022.

Despite relegation from the Scottish Premiership in 2023–24, Martindale was given a new one-year contract in May 2024.

On 30 March 2025, Martindale led Livingston to their first trophy in eight years after a 5–0 victory against Queens Park at Falkirk Stadium to win the 2024–25 Scottish Challenge Cup final. After finishing second in the league behind Falkirk in the 2024–25 Scottish Championship, he led Livingston to the Scottish Premiership at the first attempt after they came from two goals down to beat Ross County 5–3 on aggregate in the play-off final.

On 1 February 2026, after almost six years as Livingston manager, Martindale stepped down to become sporting director at the club, with assistant Marvin Bartley appointed his successor. Livingston were six points adrift at the bottom of the Scottish Premiership table amid a winless run of 22 games. Martindale is Livingston's longest-serving manager since they changed their name in 1995.

After the departure of Glenn Whelan on 6 September 2026, Martindale was announced as interim manager alongside Frankie McAvoy.

== Managerial record ==
As of match played 14 November 2026

Managerial record by team and tenure
Team	Nat	From	To	Record					Ref.
Team	Nat	From	To	G	W	D	L	Win %	Ref.
Livingston	(Scotland)	26 November 2020	1 February 2026	251	92	60	99	36.65	
Livingston (co-interim)	(Scotland)	6 September 2026	present	10	5	3	2	50.00	
Career Total				261	97	63	101	37.16	—

- Initially caretaker and appointed permanently on 21 December 2020

== Honours ==
=== Manager ===
Livingston

- Scottish Premiership Play-offs: 2024–25
- Scottish Challenge Cup: 2024–25
- Scottish League Cup runner-up: 2020–21

Individual

- Scottish Premiership Manager of the Month: December 2020, January 2021, November 2022
- Scottish Championship Manager of the Month: November 2024, February 2025, April 2025
