= Chris Kane (footballer, born 1994) =

Scottish footballer

Personal information
- Date of birth: 5 September 1994 (age 32)
- Place of birth: Edinburgh, Scotland
- Position: Striker

Team information
- Current team: Dunfermline Athletic
- Number: 20

Youth career
- Bonnyrigg Rose
- 2009–2014: St Johnstone

Senior career*
Years	Team	Apps	(Gls)
2012–2024	St Johnstone	180	(24)
2014	→ Dumbarton (loan)	18	(10)
2014–2015	→ Dumbarton (loan)	10	(5)
2017–2018	→ Queen of the South (loan)	16	(4)
2024	→ Dunfermline Athletic (loan)	10	(5)
2024–	Dunfermline Athletic	61	(17)
- * Club domestic league appearances and goals as of 21:04, 19 September 2026 (UTC)

Christopher Kane (born 5 September 1994) is a Scottish professional footballer who plays as a striker for Scottish Championship club Dunfermline Athletic.

== Career ==
Kane made his debut for St Johnstone against Kilmarnock on 9 November 2013. In January 2014, Kane signed for Scottish Championship club Dumbarton on a one-month loan deal, scoring on his debut as the Sons defeated Greenock Morton 2–0 on 4 January 2014. On 31 January 2014, his loan was extended until the end of that season. On 29 August 2014, Kane returned to Dumbarton on loan once again, agreeing a deal until January 2015. Kane scored the winner on his second debut for the Sons versus Livingston. On 24 May 2015, Kane scored his first ever goal for St Johnstone, the winner in a 1–0 win over Aberdeen which secured a fourth-placed finish for the Perth club.

On 10 August 2017, Kane along with his teammate Jason Kerr joined Scottish Championship club Queen of the South on loan until 31 January 2018. On 14 January 2018, Kane was recalled to the Perth club when his loan spell in Dumfries with the Doonhamers ended. On 29 January 2018, Kane scored a hat-trick in a 4–0 away win versus Albion Rovers in the Scottish Cup fourth round at Cliftonhill.

Kane was one of three St Johnstone players to sign a short term six-month contract extension in May 2020, as the club formulated plans amid the ongoing coronavirus pandemic. He was a regular player as St Johnstone won both cup competitions during the 2020–21 season.

He missed most of the 2022–23 season due to injury, but made a comeback near the end of the season and signed a new one-year contract with St Johnstone in June 2023.

He moved on loan to Dunfermline Athletic in February 2024 and then joined the club on permanent contract after leaving St Johnstone in May 2024 at the end of the season.

== Career statistics ==
As of 6 January 2025

Appearances and goals by club, season and competition
Club	Season	League			Scottish Cup		League Cup		Other		Total	
Club	Season	Division	Apps	Goals	Apps	Goals	Apps	Goals	Apps	Goals	Apps	Goals
St Johnstone	2013–14	Scottish Premiership	2	0	0	0	0	0	0	0	2	0
St Johnstone	2014–15	Scottish Premiership	15	1	1	0	0	0	1 (Note: Appearances in the UEFA Europa League)	0	17	1
St Johnstone	2015–16	Scottish Premiership	29	4	1	0	1	1	2	0	33	5
St Johnstone	2016–17	Scottish Premiership	25	5	2	0	5	1	0	0	32	6
St Johnstone	2017–18	Scottish Premiership	12	3	2	3	1	0	2	0	17	6
St Johnstone	2018–19	Scottish Premiership	30	3	2	0	2	0	0	0	34	3
St Johnstone	2019–20	Scottish Premiership	23	1	3	0	2	1	0	0	28	2
St Johnstone	2020–21	Scottish Premiership	28	4	4	2	8	2	0	0	40	8
St Johnstone	2021–22	Scottish Premiership	16	3	0	0	2	0	4	1	22	4
St Johnstone	2022–23	Scottish Premiership	2	1	0	0	0	0	0	0	2	1
St Johnstone	2023–24	Scottish Premiership	15	1	0	0	0	0	0	0	15	1
St Johnstone	Total		197	26	15	5	21	5	9	1	242	37
Dumbarton (loan)	2013–14	Scottish Championship	18	10	2	0	0	0	0	0	20	10
Dumbarton (loan)	2014–15	Scottish Championship	10	5	0	0	0	0	0	0	10	5
Dumbarton (loan)	Total		28	15	2	0	0	0	0	0	30	15
Queen of the South (loan)	2017–18	Scottish Championship	16	4	0	0	0	0	4 (Note: Appearances in the Scottish Challenge Cup)	1	20	5
Dunfermline Athletic (loan)	2023–24	Scottish Championship	10	5	0	0	0	0	0	0	10	5
Dunfermline Athletic	2024–25	Scottish Championship	15	5	0	0	1	0	1 (Note: Appearances in the Scottish Challenge Cup)	1	18	6
Career total			266	55	17	5	22	5	15	3	320	68

== Honours ==
St Johnstone

- Scottish Cup: 2020–21
- Scottish League Cup: 2020–21
