= Frankie McAvoy =

Scottish football coach (born 1967)

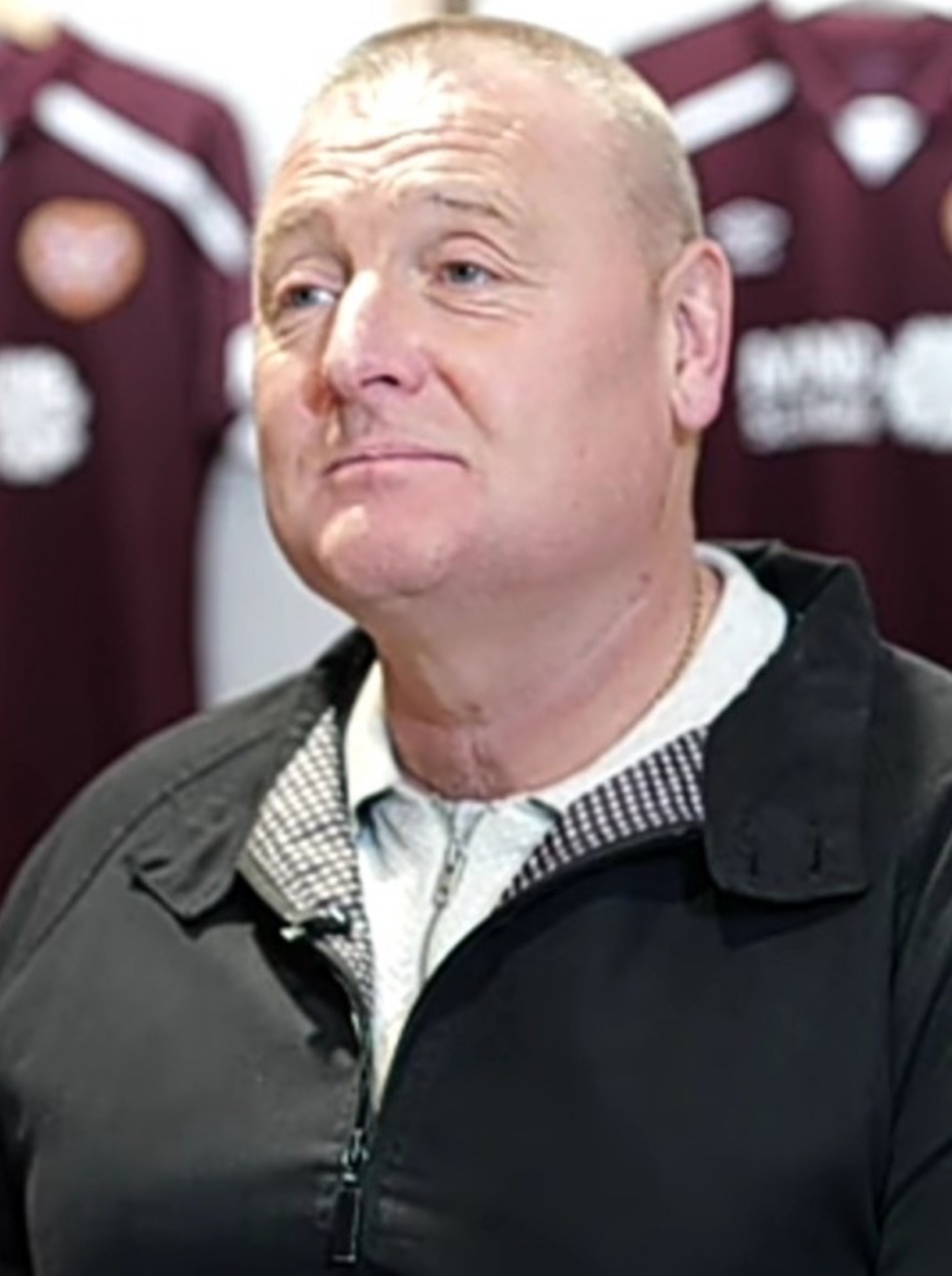

Personal information
- Date of birth: 9 July 1967 (age 59)
- Place of birth: Bellshill, Scotland

Team information
- Current team: Livingston (interim)

Senior career*
Years	Team	Apps	(Gls)
- Bellshill Athletic
- Thorniewood United
- Wishaw
- Bellshill YM
- Blantyre Victoria

Managerial career
- 2021: Preston North End
- 2023: Heart of Midlothian
- 2026–: Livingston (co-interim)
- * Club domestic league appearances and goals

Frankie McAvoy (born 9 July 1967) is a Scottish professional football coach who is currently the co-interim manager of Livingston.

McAvoy was previously the head coach at EFL Championship club Preston North End.

== Playing career ==
McAvoy did not play football at a professional level, instead playing junior football locally for Bellshill Athletic, Thorniewood United, Wishaw, Bellshill YM and Blantyre Victoria.

== Coaching career ==
In 2003, McAvoy joined Dunfermline Athletic as an academy coach. In 2005, McAvoy joined Hamilton Academical in the same role, later becoming academy director. In 2013, following Alex Neil's appointment as manager, McAvoy became first team coach at Hamilton. In 2015, both McAvoy and Neil moved to Norwich City, with McAvoy once again acting as first team coach. In July 2017, the pair moved to EFL Championship club Preston North End.

Following the dismissal of Neil on 21 March 2021, McAvoy was named as interim head coach of Preston until the end of the 2020–21 season. On 10 May 2021, McAvoy appointed head coach permanently, after winning five of his eight matches in interim charges.

On 6 December 2021, McAvoy was dismissed by Preston despite a respectable record, winning fourteen league games out of his 33 in charge.

On 3 February 2022, McAvoy joined Scottish Premiership side Heart of Midlothian as Academy Director, being given "a wide-ranging remit to oversee the youth system". McAvoy became Hearts head coach in June 2023, working with Steven Naismith. McAvoy was given that job title as Naismith did not have a coaching licence needed to be the lead coach for matches in European competitions. In September 2023, a week after Hearts had been eliminated from the Europa Conference League, Naismith was made head coach and McAvoy his assistant.

In March 2025, McAvoy joined National League side AFC Fylde as interim assistant coach until the end of the season. He departed the club following relegation at the end of the season.

On 30 June 2025, McAvoy joined National League side Carlisle United as first-team coach.

McAvoy was appointed as co-interim manager of Livingston alongside David Martindale in September 2026 following the departure of Glenn Whelan.

== Managerial statistics ==
As of match played 3 September 2023

Managerial record by team and tenure
Team	From	To	Record				
Team	From	To	P	W	D	L	Win %
Preston North End	21 March 2021	6 December 2021	33	14	9	10	42.4
Total			33	14	9	10	42.4
