= Michael O'Halloran (footballer) =

Scottish footballer

Personal information
- Full name: Michael Francis O'Halloran
- Date of birth: 6 January 1991 (age 35)
- Place of birth: Glasgow, Scotland
- Height: 5 ft 11 in (1.80 m)
- Position: Forward

Team information
- Current team: Greenock Morton
- Number: 29

Youth career
- Celtic
- Bolton Wanderers

Senior career*
Years	Team	Apps	(Gls)
2011–2014	Bolton Wanderers	0	(0)
2012	→ Sheffield United (loan)	7	(0)
2012	→ Carlisle United (loan)	1	(0)
2012–2013	→ Tranmere Rovers (loan)	23	(3)
2014–2016	St Johnstone	72	(12)
2016–2018	Rangers	29	(3)
2017–2018	→ St Johnstone (loan)	16	(5)
2018–2019	Melbourne City	1	(0)
2019–2023	St Johnstone	88	(5)
2023	→ Cove Rangers (loan)	9	(0)
2023–2025	Dunfermline Athletic	32	(1)
2025–	Greenock Morton	21	(2)

International career
2008	Scotland U17	4	(1)
2010	Scotland U19	1	(0)
2012	Scotland U21	2	(0)
- * Club domestic league appearances and goals as of 4 May 2026

Michael Francis O'Halloran (born 6 January 1991) is a Scottish footballer who plays for Greenock Morton.

Born in Glasgow, he began his professional career with English club Bolton Wanderers, but made only made two appearances in three seasons. While at Bolton he had loan spells with Sheffield United, Carlisle United and Tranmere Rovers. After two years with St Johnstone, he moved to Rangers in January 2016.

O'Halloran returned to St Johnstone on loan in July 2017. After a short spell with Australian club Melbourne City, he returned to St Johnstone for a third spell in January 2019.

O'Halloran represented Scotland at various youth levels, up to and including the under-21 level.

== Club career ==
=== Bolton Wanderers ===
O'Halloran started his professional career at Bolton Wanderers, regularly playing in the reserve side. A product of the youth system, he made his début in the League Cup tie at home to Macclesfield Town on 24 August 2011, coming on as a second-half substitute for Martin Petrov. His form in the reserves prompted Bolton to offer both O'Halloran and Joe Riley new three-and-a-half-year contracts, committing them to the club until the summer of 2015. In March 2012, O'Halloran joined Sheffield United on loan until the end of the season, and made his début for the Blades on as an 81st-minute substitute against Chesterfield in a 4–1 victory at Bramall Lane. O'Halloran was in and out of the side for the remainder of his spell, with his final appearance for the Blades coming at Wembley for the League One play-off final in which he came on as a substitute in extra time. O'Halloran scored in the game's penalty shoot out but United slipped to defeat.

In August 2012, O'Halloran joined Carlisle United on a month's loan. However, after playing just one game, a substitute appearance against MK Dons, O'Halloran opted to return to Bolton, his loan only lasting 12 days. O'Halloran then joined Tranmere Rovers on loan on in November of the same year. O'Halloran scored the first professional goal of his career on 8 December as he scored in a 2–2 draw against Portsmouth, O'Halloran loan was extended by a further month on 7 January 2013, and then again until the end of the season on January deadline day.

=== St Johnstone ===
After appearing in just two cup matches in three years at Bolton, O'Halloran made the move back to his native Scotland with St Johnstone in January 2014, signing an 18-month contract with the club. O'Halloran made his debut, coming on as a substitute, in a 1–0 win over Partick Thistle. Then on 8 February 2014, O'Halloran scored his first goal in the fifth round of Scottish Cup, in a 4–0 win over Forfar Athletic. He scored again in Saints' final home game of the season, to conclude a 3–3 draw with former club Celtic.

O'Halloran won the Scottish Premiership player of the month award for November 2015. St Johnstone rejected two bids from Rangers for O'Halloran in January 2016. Manager Tommy Wright then left O'Halloran out of their following league game, saying that O'Halloran was not "mentally ready" to play. O'Halloran made his final appearance for the club in a 2–1 defeat to Hibernian in the Scottish League Cup semi final at Tynecastle.

=== Rangers ===
On 1 February 2016, after much speculation, O'Halloran signed a four-and-a-half-year deal with the then Scottish Championship club Rangers for a fee reported to be £500,000. He made his debut for the Ibrox club as a substitute in a 1–0 victory against Raith Rovers at Stark's Park on 2 February 2016. He scored his first goal for the club in a 1–1 draw with Alloa Athletic on 13 February 2016. He picked up a winners' medal in the 2016 Scottish Challenge Cup Final at Hampden Park after defeating Peterhead 4–0 on 10 April 2016 and helped Rangers win promotion to the Scottish Premiership.

O'Halloran fell out of favour during the 2016–17 season, playing mainly as a substitute. He returned to St Johnstone on loan in July 2017. On his first appearance back at the club, he scored the winning goal in a 2–1 victory away to Kilmarnock. After scoring four goals in his first five appearances back at the club, O'Halloran won the Scottish Premiership Player of the month award for August.

O'Halleron controversially attended a Scottish Cup Final involving Celtic while he was still a Rangers player. To most observers this looked like a Rangers player supporting their arch rivals Celtic. O'Halleron stated that his intention was to attend the match viewing from a neutral section of the ground. This seems at best implausible and at worst incredible. O'Halleron regretted his decision to attend. It did not endear him to Rangers fans.

=== Melbourne City ===
O'Halloran signed a two-year contract with Australian club Melbourne City in June 2018. O'Halloran had played in the same youth team as Australian international Aaron Mooy, who recommended the move to him. He stayed at the club for only six months, being released by the club on 8 January 2019 on compassionate grounds.

=== St Johnstone (second spell) ===
O'Halloran returned to Scotland in January 2019, re-signing for St Johnstone for a second time.

==== Cove Rangers (loan) ====
On 24 February 2023, O'Halloran joined Scottish Championship club Cove Rangers on loan until the end of the season.

=== Dunfermline Athletic ===
Following his release from St Johnstone, O'Halloran signed for Championship side Dunfermline Athletic on a two-year deal.

== International career ==
O'Halloran represented Scotland at various age levels up to the under-21 team. He made his Scotland under-21 debut on 29 February 2012, appearing as a substitute in a 0–0 draw with the Netherlands.

== Personal life ==
O'Halloran's father, Michael senior, is a youth coach at Old Firm rivals Celtic. Although he never coached his son.

== Career statistics ==
As of match played 09 July 2023

Club	Season	League			National Cup		League Cup		Continental		Other		Total	
Club	Season	Division	Apps	Goals	Apps	Goals	Apps	Goals	Apps	Goals	Apps	Goals	Apps	Goals
Bolton Wanderers	2011–12	Premier League	0	0	1	0	1	0	—		—		2	0
Bolton Wanderers	2012–13	Championship	0	0	0	0	0	0	—		—		0	0
Bolton Wanderers	Total		0	0	1	0	1	0	0	0	0	0	2	0
Sheffield United (loan)	2011–12	League One	7	0	0	0	0	0	—		1 (Note: Appearance in 2012 Football League play-offs)	0	8	0
Carlisle United (loan)	2012–13	League One	1	0	0	0	0	0	—		0	0	1	0
Tranmere Rovers (loan)	2012–13	League One	23	3	2	0	0	0	—		0	0	25	3
St Johnstone	2013–14	Scottish Premiership	14	1	4	1	1	0	0	0	—		19	2
St Johnstone	2014–15	Scottish Premiership	38	9	2	1	2	0	4 (Note: Appearances in UEFA Europa League)	0	—		46	10
St Johnstone	2015–16	Scottish Premiership	20	2	1	0	3	2	1	0	—		25	4
St Johnstone	Total		72	12	7	2	6	2	5	0	0	0	90	16
Rangers	2015–16	Scottish Championship	12	3	0	0	0	0	—		1 (Note: Appearance in Scottish Challenge Cup)	0	13	3
Rangers	2016–17	Scottish Premiership	16	0	3	0	5	0	—		—		24	0
Rangers	2017–18	Scottish Premiership	1	0	0	0	0	0	0	0	—		1	0
Rangers	Total		29	3	3	0	5	0	0	0	1	0	38	3
St Johnstone (loan)	2017–18	Scottish Premiership	16	5	0	0	1	0	0	0	—		17	5
Melbourne City	2018–19	A-League	1	0	2	0	—		—		—		3	0
St Johnstone	2018–19	Scottish Premiership	14	1	0	0	0	0	—		—		14	1
St Johnstone	2019–20	Scottish Premiership	24	2	1	0	3	0	—		—		28	2
St Johnstone	2020–21	Scottish Premiership	25	1	4	1	3	0	—		—		32	2
St Johnstone	2021–22	Scottish Premiership	21	1	1	0	3	0	3 (Note: Two appearances and one goal in UEFA Europa League, one appearance UEFA Europa Conference League)	1	—		29	2
St Johnstone	2022–23	Scottish Premiership	4	0	0	0	4	0	—		—		8	0
St Johnstone	Total		88	5	6	1	13	0	3	1	0	0	111	7
Cove Rangers (loan)	2022–23	Scottish Championship	9	0	—		—		—		0	0	9	0
Dunfermline Athletic	2023–24	Scottish Championship Rangers 2025–Present	0	0	0	0	0	0	0	0	0	0	0	
Career total			246	28	20	3	25	2	8	1	2	0	304	34

== Honours ==
=== Club ===
St Johnstone

- Scottish Cup: 2013–14, 2020–21
- Scottish League Cup: 2020–21

Rangers

- Scottish Championship: 2015–16
- Scottish Challenge Cup: 2015–16

=== Individual ===
- Scottish Premiership Player of the Month: November 2015, August 2017
