= 2013–14 St Johnstone F.C. season =

St Johnstone 2013–14 football season

St Johnstone
2013–14 season
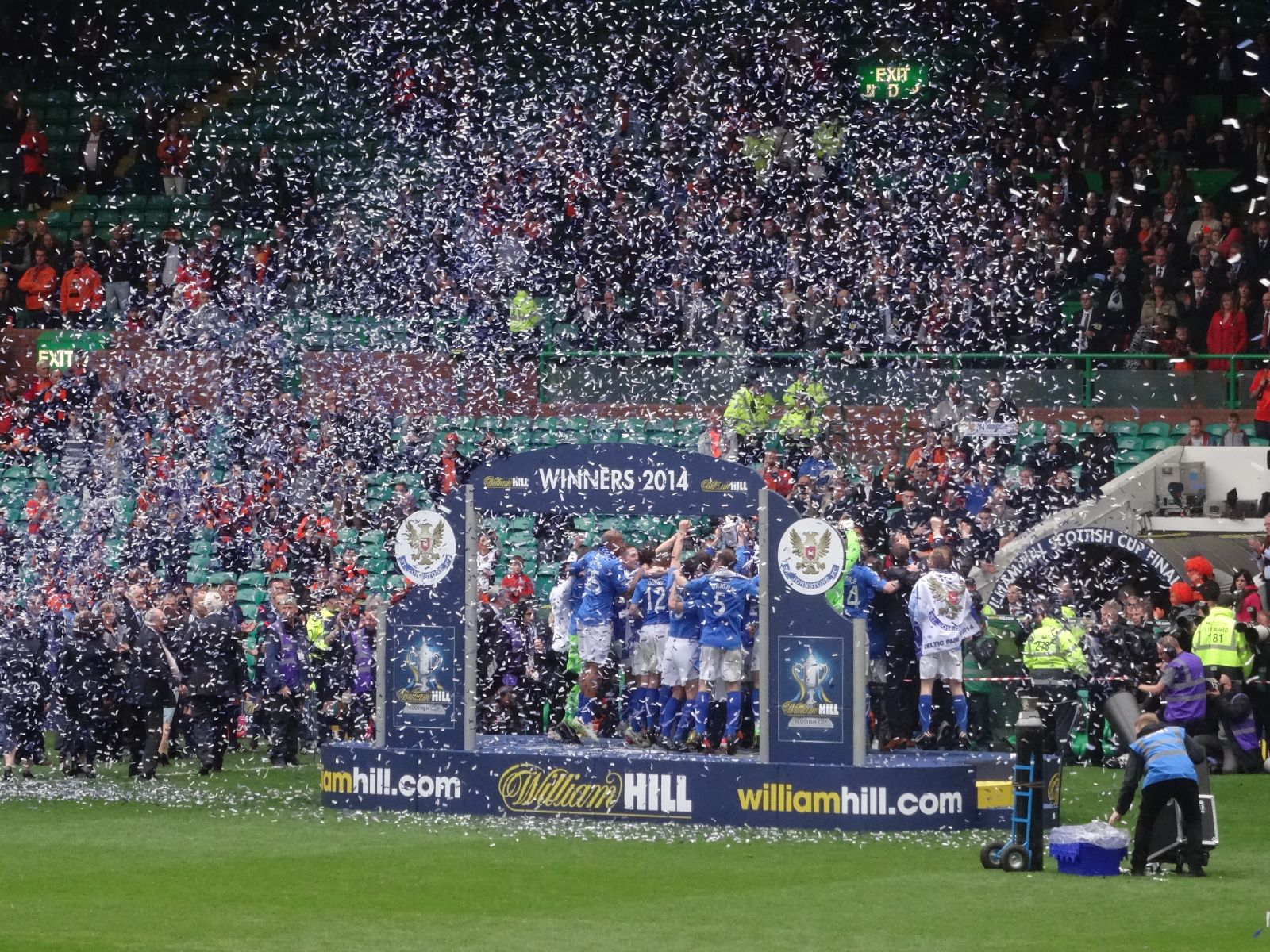
- St Johnstone players celebrating their victory in the 2014 Scottish Cup Final
- Chairman: Steve Brown
- Manager: Tommy Wright
- Stadium: McDiarmid Park
- Premiership: 6th
- Scottish Cup: Winners
- League Cup: Semi-finals
- UEFA Europa League: Third qualifying round
- Top goalscorer: League: Stevie May (20); All: Stevie May (27)
- Highest home attendance: 8,594 vs. Minsk; Europa Third QF Round; 8 August 2013
- Lowest home attendance: 1,892 vs. Motherwell; Premiership; 25 February 2014
Home colours	Away colours

The 2013–14 season was St Johnstone's fifth-consecutive season in the top flight of Scottish football and their first in the newly established Scottish Premiership, having been promoted from the Scottish First Division at the end of the 2008–09 season. St Johnstone competed in the Europa League, losing to FC Minsk in the Third qualifying round. They also reached the semi-finals of the League Cup, losing to Aberdeen and won the Scottish Cup for the first time in their history.

It was Tommy Wright's first season as manager.

== Results ==
Win Draw Loss Postponed

=== Preseason ===
10 July 2013 Friendly	Cowdenbeath	0–1	St Johnstone	Central Park
19:45			Wotherspoon 2'

13 July 2013 Friendly	Greenock Morton	0–1	St Johnstone	Cappielow
15:00			Mackay 73'	Attendance: 1,014

21 July 2013 Friendly	Dundee	1–1	St Johnstone	Dens Park
15:00	Monti 20'	Report	May 8'	Attendance: 1,766

27 July 2013 Friendly	St Johnstone	0–1	Morecambe	McDiarmid Park
		Report	Marshall	Attendance: 871

=== Scottish Premiership ===
4 August 2013 Scottish Premiership	St Johnstone	1–0	Heart of Midlothian	McDiarmid Park
15:00	May 25'	Report		Attendance: 6,174; Referee: Steven McLean

11 August 2013 Scottish Premiership	Kilmarnock	0–0	St Johnstone	Rugby Park
15:00		Report		Attendance: 3,550; Referee: Willie Collum

11 August 2013 Scottish Premiership	St Johnstone	4–0	Ross County	McDiarmid Park
15:00	Hasselbaink 14'; Wotherspoon 18'; May 50'; MacKay 62'	Report		Attendance: 2,833; Referee: Brian Colvin

24 August 2013 Scottish Premiership	Dundee United	4–0	St Johnstone	Tannadice Park
15:00	Watson 4'; Goodwillie 25'; Mackay-Steven 40'; Armstrong 53'	BBC Report		Attendance: 6,992; Referee: Bobby Madden

31 August 2013 Scottish Premiership	Aberdeen	0–0	St Johnstone	Pittodrie Stadium
15:00		Report		Attendance: 9,478; Referee: Steven McLean

14 September 2013 Scottish Premiership	St Johnstone	1–2	Hibernian	McDiarmid Park
15:00	May 17'	Report	Heffernan 35'; Collins 59'	Attendance: 4,095; Referee: Bobby Madden

21 September 2013 Scottish Premiership	Celtic	2–1	St Johnstone	Celtic Park
15:00	Pukki 11'; Mulgrew 26'	Report	Caddis 81'	Attendance: 45,220; Referee: Alan Muir

28 September 2013 Scottish Premiership	St Johnstone	1–1	Partick Thistle	McDiarmid Park
15:00	MacLean 42'	Report	Doolan 6'	Attendance: 3,248; Referee: Craig Thomson

5 October 2013 Scottish Premiership	St Johnstone	4–0	Inverness Caledonian Thistle	McDiarmid Park
15:00	May 18'; Mackay 27'; Steve MacLean 73', 82'	Report		Attendance: 3,020; Referee: Steven McLean

19 October 2013 Scottish Premiership	St Mirren	4–3	St Johnstone	St Mirren Park
15:00	McLean 8', 76' (pen.); McGowan 60'; Thompson 89'	Report	MacLean 17'; Hasselbaink 61'; Fallon 84'	Attendance: 3,739; Referee: Willie Collum

27 October 2013 Scottish Premiership	St Johnstone	2–0	Motherwell	McDiarmid Park
15:00	May 49'; Hasselbaink 64'	Report		Attendance: 2,449; Referee: Calum Murray

2 November 2013 Scottish Premiership	Heart of Midlothian	0–2	St Johnstone	Tynecastle Stadium
15:00		Report	Hasselbaink 29'; May 53'	Attendance: 13,175; Referee: Bobby Madden

8 November 2013 Scottish Premiership	St Johnstone	3–1	Kilmarnock	McDiarmid Park
	Hasselbaink 24'; May 31', 54' (pen.)	BBC Report	Irvine (yellow card) 52' (yellow-red card); Clohessy 69'; Barr (yellow card) 86' (yellow-red card)	Attendance: 2,855; Referee: Finnie

23 November 2013 Scottish Premiership	Inverness Caledonian Thistle	1–0	St Johnstone	Caledonian Stadium
15:00	McKay 4'	BBC Report		Attendance: 3,255; Referee: Beaton

7 December 2013 Scottish Premiership	St Johnstone	0–2	Aberdeen	McDiarmid Park
15:00		Report	Pawlett 17'; McGinn 85'	Attendance: 4,741; Referee: Collum

21 December 2013 Scottish Premiership	Hibernian	0–0	St Johnstone	Easter Road
		BBC Report	Cregg (red card) 31'	Attendance: 8,776; Referee: Muir

26 December 2013 Scottish Premiership	St Johnstone	0–1	Celtic	McDiarmid Park
		BBC Report	van Dijk 5'	Attendance: 7,034; Referee: Thomson

29 December 2013 Scottish Premiership	St Johnstone	3–0	Dundee United	McDiarmid Park
	May 20' (pen.), 57', 87'	BBC Report	Butcher (red card) 20'	Attendance: 7,231; Referee: Finnie

1 January 2014 Scottish Premiership	Motherwell	4–0	St Johnstone	Fir Park
	Sutton 22'; Vigurs 49'; Ainsworth 73'; McFadden 87'	BBC Report		Attendance: 3,763; Referee: Beaton

4 January 2014 Scottish Premiership	Ross County	1–0	St Johnstone	Victoria Park
	Carey 88'	BBC Report		Attendance: 3,305; Referee: Norris

11 January 2014 Scottish Premiership	St Johnstone	2–0	St Mirren	McDiarmid Park
	Davidson 71'; May 74'	BBC Report		Attendance: 2,329; Referee: Murray

18 January 2014 Scottish Premiership	St Johnstone	3–3	Heart of Midlothian	McDiarmid Park
15:00	Anderson (red card) 21'; May 39' (pen.), 49', 62' (pen.); Mannus (red card) 90'	BBC Report	Carrick 58'; Nicholson 89'; Stevenson (red card) 89'; Wilson 91'	Attendance: 3,395; Referee: Colvin

21 January 2014 Scottish Premiership	Partick Thistle	0–1	St Johnstone	Firhill Stadium
19:45		BBC Report	May 27'	Attendance: 2,719; Referee: Muir

27 January 2014 Scottish Premiership	Dundee United	P – P	St Johnstone	Tannadice Park
19:45		BBC Report		Referee: Allan
Note: Match postponed due to waterlogged pitch

16 February 2014 Scottish Premiership	Celtic	3–0	St Johnstone	Celtic Park
15:00	Stokes 16', 64', 66'	BBC Report		Attendance: 45,239; Referee: McLean

22 February 2014 Scottish Premiership	St Johnstone	0–1	Inverness Caledonian Thistle	McDiarmid Park
15:00		BBC Report	Warren 42'	Attendance: 2,415; Referee: Euan Norris

25 February 2014 Scottish Premiership	St Johnstone	3–0	Motherwell	McDiarmid Park
	MacLean 6', 35'; Miller 87'	BBC Report		Attendance: 1,892; Referee: Clancy

1 March 2014 Scottish Premiership	Aberdeen	1–0	St Johnstone	Pittodrie Stadium
15:00	Jack 8'	BBC Report		Attendance: 11,487; Referee: Collum

12 March 2014 Scottish Premiership	Dundee United	0–1	St Johnstone	Tannadice Park
15:00		Report	May 48'	Attendance: 6,720; Referee: Crawford Allan

15 March 2014 Scottish Premiership	St Johnstone	0–1	Ross County	McDiarmid Park
		BBC Report	de Leeuw 29'	Attendance: 2,213; Referee: Madden

22 March 2014 Scottish Premiership	St Johnstone	2–0	Hibernian	McDiarmid Park
	MacLean 18'; McGivern 55' (own goal)	BBC Report		Attendance: 3,553; Referee: McLean

25 March 2014 Scottish Premiership	St Mirren	0–1	St Johnstone	St Mirren Park
15:00		BBC Report	MacLean 39'	Attendance: 2,817; Referee: Muir

29 March 2014 Scottish Premiership	St Johnstone	1–1	Partick Thistle	McDiarmid Park
15:00	May 9'	BBC Report	Doolan 90'	Attendance: 2,999; Referee: Craig Thomson

5 April 2014 Scottish Premiership	Kilmarnock	1–2	St Johnstone	Rugby Park
15:00	Muirhead 5'	BBC Report	Wright 31'; Anderson 44'	Attendance: 3,665; Referee: McLean

19 April 2014 Scottish Premiership	St Johnstone	2–0	Dundee United	McDiarmid Park
15:00	Anderson 32'; May 76'	BBC Report		Attendance: 5,223; Referee: Beaton

26 April 2014 Scottish Premiership	Aberdeen	1–1	St Johnstone	Pittodrie Stadium
15:00	Rooney 31'	BBC Report	May 8'	Attendance: 10,003; Referee: Muir

3 May 2014 Scottish Premiership	Motherwell	2–1	St Johnstone	Fir Park
	Ainsworth 21'; McManus 36'	BBC Report	Mackay 27'	Attendance: 7,201; Referee: Clancy

7 May 2014 Scottish Premiership	St Johnstone	3–3	Celtic	McDiarmid Park
	Clancy 9'; Brown 84'; O'Halloran 86'	BBC Report	Commons 53' (pen.); Pukki 73'; Van Dijk 77'	Attendance: 4,624; Referee: McLean

11 May 2014 Scottish Premiership	Inverness Caledonian Thistle	2–0	St Johnstone	Caledonian Stadium
12:15	Christie 59'; Tansey 90'	BBC Report		Attendance: 3,121; Referee: Alan Muir

=== UEFA Europa League ===
18 July 2013 Second QF Round Leg 1	Rosenborg BK	0–1	St Johnstone	Lerkendal Stadion, Norway
19:45		Report	Wright 19'	Attendance: 5,952; Referee: Halis Özkahya

25 July 2013 Second QF Round Leg 2	St Johnstone	1–1 (2–1 agg.)	Rosenborg BK	McDiarmid Park
19:45	May 21'	Report	Soderlund 4'	Attendance: 7,850; Referee: Miroslav Zelinka

1 August 2013 Third QF Round Leg 1	Minsk	0–1	St Johnstone	Neman Stadium, Grodno, Belarus
19:45			MacLean 69'	Referee: Marcin Borski Poland)

8 August 2013 Third QF Round Leg 2	St Johnstone	0–1 (1–1 agg.) (2–3 p)	Minsk	McDiarmid Park
19:45		Report	Rnić 75'	Attendance: 8,594; Referee: Pavle Radovanović
	Penalties
	Mackay (penalty missed); Cregg (penalty missed); Fallon (penalty scored); Edwards (penalty scored); MacLean (penalty missed)		(penalty scored) Vasilyuk; (penalty scored) Razin; (penalty scored) Sverchinskiy; (penalty missed) Kibuk; (penalty missed) Kazeka

=== Scottish League Cup ===
24 September 2013 Third round	Hamilton	0–3	St Johnstone	New Douglas Park
19:45		Report	May 4', 90'; Edwards 86'	Attendance: 1,059; Referee: John Beaton

30 October 2013 Quarter Final	Greenock Morton	0–1	St Johnstone	Cappielow Park
19:45		Report	McDonald	Attendance: 2,619; Referee: John McKendrick

1 February 2014 Semi Final	Aberdeen	4–0	St Johnstone	Easter Road
15:00	Hayes 3', 79'; Pawlett 32'; Rooney 63'	BBC Report		Attendance: 16,761; Referee: Madden

=== Scottish Cup ===
30 November 2013 Scottish Cup round 4	St Johnstone	2–0	Livingston	McDiarmid Park
15:00	May 24'; Jahic 62'	BBC Report		Attendance: 2,294; Referee: Dallas

8 February 2014 Scottish Cup round 5	Forfar Athletic	0–4	St Johnstone	Station Park
15:00		BBC Report	Croft 27'; Wright 42'; O'Halloran 64'; Dunne 80'	Attendance: 1,803; Referee: Beaton

8 March 2014 Quarter Final	Raith Rovers	1–3	St Johnstone	Stark's Park
12:15	Cardle 21'	BBC Report	McDonald 4'; Hasselbaink 49'; Anderson 79'	Attendance: 3,767; Referee: Thomson

13 April 2014 Semi Final	St Johnstone	2–1	Aberdeen	Ibrox Stadium
12:45	May 61', 84'	BBC Report	McGinn 15'	Attendance: 19,057; Referee: Collum

17 May 2014 Final	St Johnstone	2–0	Dundee United	Celtic Park
15:00	Anderson 45+1'; MacLean 84'	BBC Report		Attendance: Thomson; Referee: 47,345

== Player statistics ==
=== Squad ===
Last updated 17 May 2014

No.	Pos	Nat	Player	Total		Premiership		Europa League		League Cup		Scottish Cup	
No.	Pos	Nat	Player	Apps	Goals	Apps	Goals	Apps	Goals	Apps	Goals	Apps	Goals
1	GK	(Northern Ireland) NIR	Alan Mannus	44	0	34+0	0	4+0	0	2+0	0	4+0	0
2	DF	(Scotland) SCO	Dave Mackay	48	3	36+0	3	4+0	0	3+0	0	5+0	0
3	DF	(Scotland) SCO	Tam Scobbie	27	0	18+3	0	4+0	0	0+1	0	1+0	0
4	MF	(Republic of Ireland) IRL	Patrick Cregg	28	0	13+7	0	4+0	0	2+0	0	1+1	0
5	DF	(Scotland) SCO	Frazer Wright	36	3	25+1	1	4+0	1	3+0	0	3+0	1
6	DF	(Scotland) SCO	Steven Anderson	39	4	29+0	2	4+0	0	2+0	0	4+0	2
7	MF	(Scotland) SCO	Chris Millar	42	0	26+7	0	1+1	0	3+0	0	3+1	0
8	MF	(Scotland) SCO	Gary McDonald	40	2	26+3	0	4+0	0	3+0	1	3+1	1
9	FW	(Scotland) SCO	Steve MacLean	29	10	18+3	8	4+0	1	1+0	0	3+0	1
10	MF	(Scotland) SCO	David Wotherspoon	50	1	32+6	1	4+0	0	2+1	0	4+1	0
11	FW	(Netherlands) NED	Nigel Hasselbaink	39	6	20+10	5	4+0	0	3+0	0	2+0	1
12	MF	(Scotland) SCO	David Robertson	0	0	0+0	0	0+0	0	0+0	0	0+0	0
12	MF	(England) ENG	James Dunne	17	1	13+0	0	0+0	0	0+0	0	3+1	1
14	FW	(Wales) WAL	Gwion Edwards	17	1	4+9	0	0+3	0	0+1	1	0+0	0
15	GK	(England) ENG	Steve Banks	6	0	4+0	0	0+0	0	1+0	0	1+0	0
16	MF	(Scotland) SCO	Liam Caddis	10	1	0+8	1	1+0	0	0+0	0	0+1	0
17	FW	(Scotland) SCO	Stevie May	49	27	34+4	20	2+1	1	3+0	2	5+0	4
18	MF	(Scotland) SCO	Murray Davidson	24	1	18+3	1	0+1	0	0+1	0	1+0	0
19	DF	(Scotland) SCO	Gary Miller	29	1	18+5	1	0+2	0	1+2	0	1+0	0
20	MF	(Scotland) SCO	Scott Brown	5	1	2+2	1	0+0	0	0+0	0	0+1	0
22	MF	(England) ENG	Lee Croft	23	0	10+9	0	0+0	0	1+0	0	2+1	0
23	DF	(Ireland) EIR	Tim Clancy	4	1	3+1	1	0+0	0	0+0	0	0+0	0
24	DF	(Scotland) SCO	Brian Easton	32	0	22+1	0	0+1	0	3+0	0	5+0	0
25	FW	(Bosnia and Herzegovina) BIH	Sanel Jahić	6	1	3+2	0	0+0	0	0+0	0	1+0	1
25	FW	(Scotland) SCO	Chris Iwelumo	8	0	0+6	0	0+0	0	0+1	0	0+1	0
27	FW	(New Zealand) NZL	Rory Fallon	12	1	1+7	1	0+2	0	0+1	0	0+1	0
29	FW	(Scotland) SCO	Michael O'Halloran	19	2	9+5	1	0+0	0	0+1	0	3+1	1
30	GK	(Scotland) SCO	Zander Clark	0	0	0+0	0	0+0	0	0+0	0	0+0	0
31	FW	(Scotland) SCO	Dylan Easton	0	0	0+0	0	0+0	0	0+0	0	0+0	0
41	FW	(Scotland) SCO	Chris Kane	2	0	0+2	0	0+0	0	0+0	0	0+0	0
44	MF	(Scotland) SCO	Craig Thomson	1	0	0+1	0	0+0	0	0+0	0	0+0	0

=== Disciplinary record ===
Includes all competitive matches.

Last updated 17 May 2014

Number	Nation	Position	Name	Premiership		Europa League		League Cup		Scottish Cup		Total	
Number	Nation	Position	Name	Yellow card	Red card	Yellow card	Red card	Yellow card	Red card	Yellow card	Red card	Yellow card	Red card
1	(Northern Ireland)	GK	Alan Mannus	0	1	0	0	0	0	0	0	0	1
2	(Scotland)	DF	Dave Mackay	5	0	1	0	1	0	0	0	7	0
3	(Scotland)	DF	Tam Scobbie	2	0	0	0	0	0	0	0	2	0
4	(Republic of Ireland)	MF	Patrick Cregg	6	1	0	0	0	0	0	0	6	1
5	(Scotland)	DF	Frazer Wright	6	1	1	0	0	0	0	0	7	1
6	(Scotland)	DF	Steven Anderson	4	1	1	0	0	0	0	0	5	1
7	(Scotland)	MF	Chris Millar	5	0	0	0	0	0	0	0	5	0
9	(Scotland)	MF	Steve MacLean	4	1	0	0	0	0	1	0	5	1
10	(Scotland)	MF	David Wotherspoon	4	0	1	0	1	0	0	0	6	0
11	(Netherlands)	FW	Nigel Hasselbaink	3	0	0	0	1	0	0	0	4	0
12	(Scotland)	MF	David Robertson	0	0	0	0	0	0	0	0	0	0
12	(England)	MF	James Dunne	4	0	0	0	0	0	1	0	5	0
14	(Wales)	FW	Gwion Edwards	2	0	0	0	0	0	0	0	2	0
16	(Scotland)	MF	Liam Caddis	1	0	0	0	0	0	0	0	1	0
17	(Scotland)	FW	Stevie May	4	0	0	0	0	0	2	0	6	0
18	(Scotland)	MF	Murray Davidson	4	0	1	0	0	0	0	0	5	0
19	(Scotland)	DF	Gary Miller	2	0	0	0	0	0	0	0	2	0
22	(England)	MF	Lee Croft	3	0	0	0	0	0	1	0	4	0
23	(Republic of Ireland)	DF	Tim Clancy	1	0	0	0	0	0	0	0	1	0
24	(Scotland)	DF	Brian Easton	1	0	0	0	1	0	1	0	3	0
25	(Scotland)	FW	Chris Iwelumo	1	0	0	0	0	0	0	0	1	0
27	(New Zealand)	FW	Rory Fallon	0	1	1	0	0	0	0	0	1	1

== Team statistics ==
=== League table ===
Pos	Team	Pld	W	D	L	GF	GA	GD	Pts	Qualification or relegation
1	Celtic (C)	38	31	6	1	102	25	+77	99	Qualification for the Champions League second qualifying round
2	Motherwell	38	22	4	12	64	60	+4	70	Qualification for the Europa League second qualifying round
3	Aberdeen	38	20	8	10	53	38	+15	68	Qualification for the Europa League first qualifying round
4	Dundee United	38	16	10	12	65	50	+15	58	
5	Inverness Caledonian Thistle	38	16	9	13	44	44	0	57	
6	St Johnstone	38	15	8	15	48	42	+6	53	Qualification for the Europa League second qualifying round (Note: St Johnstone, as winners of the 2013–14 Scottish Cup, qualified for the Europa League second qualifying round.)
7	Ross County	38	11	7	20	44	62	−18	40	
8	St Mirren	38	10	9	19	39	58	−19	39	
9	Kilmarnock	38	11	6	21	45	66	−21	39	
10	Partick Thistle	38	8	14	16	46	65	−19	38	
11	Hibernian (R)	38	8	11	19	31	51	−20	35	Qualification for the Premiership play-off final
12	Heart of Midlothian (R)	38	10	8	20	45	65	−20	23 (Note: Heart of Midlothian were deducted 15 points for entering administration)	Relegation to the Championship

Source: SPFL Archive
Rules for classification: 1) points; 2) goal difference; 3) number of goals scored.
(C) Champions; (R) Relegated

=== Division summary ===
Round	1	2	3	4	5	6	7	8	9	10	11	12	13	14	15	16	17	18	19	20	21	22	23	24	25	26	27	28	29	30	31	32	33	34	35	36	37	38
Ground	H	A	A	A	A	H	A	H	H	A	H	A	H	A	H	A	H	H	A	A	H	H	A	A	H	H	A	H	H	H	A	H	A	H	A	A	H	A
Result	W	D	W	L	D	L	L	D	W	L	W	W	W	L	L	D	L	W	L	L	W	D	W	L	L	W	L	W	L	W	W	D	W	W	D	L	D	L
Position	5	4	2	3	5	5	8	8	6	7	6	5	5	6	6	6	6	6	6	7	6	6	6	6	6	6	6	6	6	6	6	6	6	6	6	6	6	6

Updated to match(es) played on 17 May 2014. Source:
A = Away; H = Home; W = Win; D = Draw; L = Loss

== Transfers ==
=== Players in ===
Player	From	Fee
(Wales) Gwion Edwards	(Wales) Swansea City	Loan
(Scotland) David Wotherspoon	(Scotland) Hibernian	Free
(New Zealand) Rory Fallon	(Scotland) Aberdeen	Free
(England) Steve Banks	(Scotland) Dundee United	Free
(Scotland) Brian Easton	(Scotland) Dundee	Free
(Scotland) Gary McDonald	(England) Morecambe	Free
(Scotland) Scott Brown	(England) Bradford City	Free
(England) Alex Kitchen	(England) Newcastle United	Free
(Scotland) Michael O'Halloran	(England) Bolton Wanderers	Free
(Scotland) Chris Iwelumo	(England) Scunthorpe United	Free
(England) James Dunne	(England) Stevenage	Loan
(Republic of Ireland) Tim Clancy	(Scotland) Hibernian	Free

=== Players out ===
Player	To	Fee
(Scotland) Liam Craig	(Scotland) Hibernian	Free
(England) Rowan Vine	(Scotland) Hibernian	Free
(France) Grégory Tadé	(Romania) CFR Cluj	Free
(Scotland) David McCracken	(Scotland) Falkirk	Free
(Scotland) Zander Clark	(Scotland) Queen of the South	Loan
(Scotland) Gareth Rodger	(Scotland) Montrose	Loan
(Scotland) Liam Caddis	(Scotland) Alloa Athletic	Loan
(Scotland) David Robertson	(Scotland) Greenock Morton	Free
(Scotland) Chris Kane	(Scotland) Dumbarton	Loan
(Bosnia and Herzegovina) Sanel Jahić	(Switzerland) Grasshopper	Free
