= 2011–12 St Johnstone F.C. season =

St Johnstone
2011–12 season
- Chairman: Geoff Brown (until 3 November); Steve Brown (from 3 November)
- Manager: Derek McInnes (until 19 October); Steve Lomas (from 3 November)
- Stadium: McDiarmid Park
- SPL: Sixth place
- Scottish Cup: Fifth round
- League Cup: Third round
- Top goalscorer: League: Francisco Sandaza (15); All: Francisco Sandaza (18)
- Highest home attendance: 6,759 v Celtic, 18 December 2011
- Lowest home attendance: 1,607 v Aberdeen, 13 December 2011
- Average home league attendance: 4,170

The 2011–12 season was St Johnstone's third consecutive season in the Scottish Premier League, having competed in the league since their promotion in the 2008–09 season. St Johnstone also competed in the League Cup and the Scottish Cup.

== Summary ==
St Johnstone finished sixth in the Scottish Premier League securing a place in the second qualifying round of the 2012–13 Europa League. They reached the fifth round of the Scottish Cup where they were beaten by eventual winners Hearts. They were beaten in the League Cup by fellow SPL side St Mirren in the third round.

=== Management ===
[St Johnstone started the season under Derek McInnes and after eleven games on 19 October McInnes was appointed manager of Bristol City and left St Johnstone along with assistant Tony Docherty. On 3 November 2011 Steve Lomas was appointed as manager.

== Results ==
Win Draw Loss

=== Pre-season ===
4 July 2011 Friendly	Arbroath	0–2	St Johnstone	Gayfield Park
		St Johnstone Report	Craig 46'; Moon 90'

7 July 2011 Friendly	(Republic of Ireland) Drogheda United	1–1	St Johnstone	Hunky Dorys Park
	Wright 39' (o.g.)	St Johnstone Report	Finnigan 43'	Referee: Phil Cashera

10 July 2011 Friendly	(Republic of Ireland) UCD	1–4	St Johnstone	UCD Bowl
	O’Sullivan 58'	St.Johnstone Report	Moon 7'; Trialist 22'; May 45'; M. Davidson 63'	Referee: Derek Tomley

13 July 2011 Friendly	Dundee	0–2	St Johnstone	Dens Park
		St Johnstone Report	May 19'; Mackay 50'	Attendance: 2,172; Referee: Stephen Finnie

16 July 2011 Friendly	Ayr United	1–1	St Johnstone	Somerset Park
	Roberts 36' (pen.)	Ayr Report	Millar 31'	Referee: Iain Brines

=== Scottish Premier League ===
23 July 2011 SPL	Aberdeen	0–0	St Johnstone	Pittodrie Stadium
		BBC Report		Attendance: 10,001; Referee: Steve Conroy

30 July 2011 SPL	St Johnstone	0–2	Rangers	McDiarmid Park
		BBC Report	Naismith 31'; Jelavić 50'	Attendance: 6,459; Referee: Alan Muir

13 August 2011 SPL	St Johnstone	0–1	Dunfermline Athletic	McDiarmid Park
		BBC Sport	Kirk 30'; Potter (red card) 61'	Attendance: 3,466; Referee: Salmond

21 August 2011 SPL	Celtic	0–1	St Johnstone	Celtic Park
		BBC Sport	Mackay 60'	Referee: Winter

27 July 2011 SPL	St Johnstone	3–3	Dundee United	McDiarmid Park
	Sandaza 34' (pen.), 45'; Craig 37'	BBC Report	Douglas 2'; Mackay-Steven 80'; Gunning 83'	Attendance: 4,480; Referee: Richmond

10 September 2011 SPL	St Mirren	0–0	St Johnstone	St Mirren Park
		BBC Sport		Attendance: 3,855; Referee: Mclean

17 September 2011 SPL	Motherwell	0–3	St Johnstone	Fir Park
		BBC Sport	Clancy 20' (o.g.); Sandaza 75'; Craig 85'	Attendance: 4,336; Referee: Allan

25 September 2011 SPL	St Johnstone	2–0	Heart of Midlothian	McDiarmid Park
	Sheridan 30', 55'	BBC Sport		Attendance: 2,770; Referee: O'Reilly

28 September 2011 SPL	Hibernian	3–2	St Johnstone	Easter Road
	Sproule 17'; O'Connor 37', 63' (pen.)	BBC Sport	Craig 19'; Sheridan 88'	Attendance: 8,323; Referee: Conroy

1 October 2011 SPL	Kilmarnock	1–2	St Johnstone	Rugby Park
	Pascali 36'	BBC Sport	Sandaza 22'; Sheridan 73'	Attendance: 4,059; Referee: Brines

15 October 2011 SPL	St Johnstone	2–0	Inverness CT	McDiarmid Park
	Sandaza 12'; Mackay 65'	BBC Sport		Attendance: 2,909; Referee: Thomson

22 October 2011 SPL	Dundee United	0–0	St Johnstone	Tannadice Park
		BBC Sport		Attendance: 6,707; Referee: Muir

29 October 2011 SPL	St Johnstone	0–1	St Mirren	McDiarmid Park
		BBC Sport	McLean 81'	Attendance: 2,939; Referee: Norris

19 November 2011 SPL	Rangers	0–0	St Johnstone	Ibrox Stadium
		BBC Sport		Attendance: 45,279; Referee: Norris

26 November 2011 SPL	St Johnstone	3–1	Hibernian	McDiarmid Park
	Sandaza 38'; Haber 45'; Mackay 47'	BBC Sport	Towell 26'	Attendance: 3,782; Referee: Madden

3 December 2011 SPL	Heart of Midlothian	1–2	St Johnstone	Tynecastle Park
	Taouil 86'	BBC Report	Craig 3'; Mackay 79' (pen.)	Attendance: 12,815; Referee: O'Reilly

10 December 2011 SPL	St Johnstone	0–3	Motherwell	McDiarmid Park
		BBC Sport	Daley 16'; Murphy 28', 68'	Attendance: 2,885; Referee: Muir

13 December 2011 SPL	St Johnstone	1–2	Aberdeen	McDiarmid Park
	Haber 90+2'	BBC Sport	Vernon 13'; Jack 79'; Considine (yellow card) 83' (yellow-red card)	Attendance: 1,607; Referee: McLean

18 December 2011 SPL	St Johnstone	0–2	Celtic	McDiarmid Park
		BBC Sport	Hooper 60'; Ki 64'	Attendance: 6,759; Referee: Norris

24 December 2011 SPL	Dunfermline Athletic	0–3	St Johnstone	East End Park
		BBC Sport	Smith 38' (o.g.); Sandaza 52'; Craig 59'	Attendance: 4,474; Referee: Thomson

28 December 2011 SPL	St Johnstone	2–0	Kilmarnock	McDiarmid Park
	Sandaza 26', 45+1'	BBC Sport		Attendance: 2,394; Referee: Brines

14 January 2012 SPL	St Johnstone	1–2	Rangers	McDiarmid Park
	Bocanegra 68' (o.g.)	BBC Sport	Jelavić 24', 81'	Attendance: 6,577; Referee: Thomson

21 January 2012 SPL	Hibernian	2–3	St Johnstone	Easter Road
	Griffiths 70' (pen.); Booth 84'	BBC Sport	Croft 30'; Craig 71'; Sandaza 87'	Attendance: 8,772; Referee: Norris

28 January 2012 SPL	Motherwell	3–2	St Johnstone	Fir Park
	Ojamaa 22', 65'; Lasley 75'	BBC Sport	Morris 45'; Sandaza 81' (pen.)	Attendance: 4,520; Referee: Murray

11 February 2012 SPL	St Johnstone	1–5	Dundee United	McDiarmid Park
	Anderson 66'	BBC Sport	Anderson 35' (o.g.); Davidson 61' (o.g.); Russell 84'; Daly 89'; Lačný 90'	Attendance: 4,319; Referee: Brines

19 February 2012 SPL	Aberdeen	0–0	St Johnstone	Pittodrie Stadium
		BBC Sport		Attendance: 6,936; Referee: Salmond

25 February 2012 SPL	St Johnstone	3–1	Dunfermline	McDiarmid Park
	M. Davidson 33'; C. Davidson 35'; Croft 78'	BBC Sport	Burns 73'	Attendance: 3,732; Referee: Colvin

3 March 2012 SPL	Kilmarnock	0–0	St Johnstone	Rugby Park
	Shiels (yellow card) 76' (red card)	BBC Sport	Sheridan (yellow card) 88' (red card)	Attendance: 3,768; Referee: Charleston

17 March 2012 SPL	St Mirren	0–3	St Johnstone	St Mirren Park
		BBC Report; Guardian Stats	Croft 2'; McCracken 76'; Sandaza 85'	Attendance: 3,768; Referee: Madden

24 March 2012 SPL	St Johnstone	2–1	Heart of Midlothian	McDiarmid Park
	M. Davidson 35'; Sandaza 77' (pen.)	BBC Sport	Holt 29'	Attendance: 4,365; Referee: McLean

28 March 2012 SPL	Inverness CT	0–1	St Johnstone	Caledonian Stadium
		BBC Sport	Sandaza 41' (pen.)	Attendance: 3,035; Referee: Collum

1 April 2012 SPL	Celtic	2–0	St Johnstone	Celtic Park
	Samaras 66'; Millar 70' (o.g.)	BBC Sport		Attendance: 57,848; Referee: Salmond

7 April 2012 SPL	St Johnstone	0–0	Inverness CT	McDiarmid Park
		BBC Sport		Attendance: 3,326; Referee: Clancy

21 April 2012 SPL	St Johnstone	0–2	Dundee United	McDiarmid Park
	Sandaza (yellow card) 57' (yellow-red card)	BBC Sport	Robertson 32'; Rankin 90'	Attendance: 5,826; Referee: Norris

28 April 2012 SPL	Motherwell	5–1	St Johnstone	Fir Park
	Higdon 17' (pen.); Law 20'; Murphy 52'; Ojamaa 83', 87'	BBC Sport	Craig 59' (pen.)	Attendance: 4,743; Referee: Madden

3 May 2012 SPL	Celtic	1–0	St Johnstone	Celtic Park
	Stokes 28'	BBC Sport		Attendance: 50,297; Referee: Allan

6 May 2012 SPL	Heart of Midlothian	2–0	St Johnstone	Tynecastle Park
	Skácel 21'; Webster 58'	BBC Sport		Attendance: 12,543; Referee: McLean

13 May 2012 SPL	St Johnstone	0–4	Rangers	McDiarmid Park
		BBC Sport	McCulloch 23'; Aluko 56', 62', 73'	Attendance: 6,459; Referee: Madden

=== Scottish League Cup ===
24 August 2011 Second round	St Johnstone	3–0	Livingston	McDiarmid Park
	Wright 13'; Sandaza 18', 25'	BBC Sport		Attendance: 2,439; Referee: Steve Conroy

20 September 2011 Third round	St Johnstone	0–2	St Mirren	McDiarmid Park
		BBC Sport	Adams 39' (o.g.); Goodwin 45'	Attendance: 2,296; Referee: Craig Thomson

=== Scottish Cup ===
7 January 2012 Fourth round	St Johnstone	2–1	Brechin City	McDiarmid Park
	M. Davidson 6'; Sandaza 46'	BBC Report	McManus 26'; McLauchlan (yellow card) 90' (red card)	Attendance: 2,467; Referee: Tumilty

5 February 2012 Fifth round	Heart of Midlothian	1–1	St Johnstone	Tynecastle Park
	Templeton 10'	BBC Report	MacKay (red card) 74'; Sheridan 77'	Attendance: 9,185; Referee: Thomson

14 February 2012 Fifth round replay	St Johnstone	1–2	Heart of Midlothian	McDiarmid Park
	M. Davidson 84'	BBC Report	Hamill 95'; Žaliūkas 117'	Attendance: 3,404; Referee: Winter

== Player statistics ==
=== Squad information ===
Last updated 14 May 2012

No.	Pos	Nat	Player	Total		SPL		Scottish Cup		League Cup	
No.	Pos	Nat	Player	Apps	Goals	Apps	Goals	Apps	Goals	Apps	Goals
1	GK	(Finland) FIN	Peter Enckelman	29	0	25+0	0	2+0	0	2+0	0
2	DF	(Scotland) SCO	Dave Mackay	40	4	36+0	4	2+0	0	2+0	0
3	DF	(Scotland) SCO	Callum Davidson	27	1	26+0	1	1+0	0	0+0	0
4	MF	(England) ENG	Jody Morris	32	1	28+0	1	3+0	0	1+0	0
5	DF	(Scotland) SCO	Frazer Wright	26	1	23+0	0	1+0	0	2+0	1
6	DF	(Scotland) SCO	Steven Anderson	34	1	26+3	1	3+0	0	2+0	0
7	MF	(Scotland) SCO	Chris Millar	33	0	27+3	0	1+1	0	1+0	0
8	MF	(Scotland) SCO	Murray Davidson	30	4	24+2	2	3+0	2	1+0	0
9	FW	(England) ENG	Sam Parkin	2	0	1+1	0	0+0	0	0+0	0
9	MF	(England) ENG	Lee Croft	13	3	10+1	3	1+1	0	0+0	0
10	MF	(Scotland) SCO	Liam Craig	41	7	36+0	7	3+0	0	2+0	0
11	FW	(Republic of Ireland) IRL	Cillian Sheridan	32	5	25+3	4	1+1	1	2+0	0
12	DF	(Republic of Ireland) IRL	Alan Maybury	26	0	15+7	0	2+0	0	1+1	0
14	MF	(Scotland) SCO	Kevin Moon	19	0	14+5	0	0+0	0	0+0	0
15	GK	(Northern Ireland) NIR	Alan Mannus	14	0	13+0	0	1+0	0	0+0	0
16	MF	(Scotland) SCO	David Robertson	20	0	10+6	0	2+0	0	0+2	0
17	FW	(Scotland) SCO	Sean Higgins	4	0	0+3	0	0+0	0	1+0	0
18	DF	(Scotland) SCO	David McCracken	32	1	27+1	1	3+0	0	0+1	0
19	FW	(England) ENG	Carl Finnigan	12	0	3+8	0	1+0	0	0+0	0
20	MF	(Scotland) SCO	Jamie Adams	9	0	6+1	0	0+0	0	2+0	0
21	FW	(Spain) ESP	Francisco Sandaza	34	18	28+1	15	3+0	1	2+0	2
22	MF	(Scotland) SCO	Willie Gibson	13	0	1+10	0	0+0	0	1+1	0
22	FW	(England) ENG	Kudus Oyenuga	2	0	1+0	0	0+1	0	0+0	0
23	FW	(Canada) CAN	Marcus Haber	34	2	15+16	2	1+1	0	0+1	0
24	DF	(Republic of Ireland) IRL	Graham Gartland	0	0	0+0	0	0+0	0	0+0	0
24	MF	(England) ENG	Jack Compton	3	0	0+3	0	0+0	0	0+0	0
26	MF	(Scotland) SCO	Liam Caddis	0	0	0+0	0	0+0	0	0+0	0
27	FW	(Scotland) SCO	Stevie May	1	0	0+1	0	0+0	0	0+0	0
45	DF	(Scotland) SCO	Michael Hart	0	0	0+0	0	0+0	0	0+0	0
46	FW	(Scotland) SCO	James Keatings	5	0	0+4	0	0+1	0	0+0	0
47	FW	(Scotland) SCO	Derek Riordan	4	0	2+2	0	0+0	0	0+0	0

=== Disciplinary record ===
Includes all competitive matches.

Last updated 14 May 2012

Number	Nation	Position	Name	Scottish Premier League		League Cup		Scottish Cup		Total	
Number	Nation	Position	Name	Yellow card	Red card	Yellow card	Red card	Yellow card	Red card	Yellow card	Red card
1	(Finland)	GK	Peter Enckelman	0	0	0	0	0	0	0	0
2	(Scotland)	DF	Dave Mackay	2	0	1	1	1	0	4	1
3	(Scotland)	DF	Callum Davidson	4	0	0	0	0	0	4	0
4	(England)	MF	Jody Morris	7	0	1	0	0	0	8	0
5	(Scotland)	DF	Frazer Wright	6	0	0	0	0	0	6	0
6	(Scotland)	DF	Steven Anderson	5	0	0	0	0	0	5	0
7	(Scotland)	MF	Chris Millar	5	0	0	0	0	0	5	0
8	(Scotland)	MF	Murray Davidson	6	0	2	0	0	0	8'	0
9	(Scotland)	FW	Sam Parkin	0	0	0	0	0	0	0	0
9	(England)	MF	Lee Croft	2	0	1	0	0	0	3	0
10	(Scotland)	MF	Liam Craig	7	0	0	0	0	0	7	0
11	(Republic of Ireland)	FW	Cillian Sheridan	3	1	2	0	0	0	5	1
12	(Republic of Ireland)	DF	Alan Maybury	5	0	1	0	0	0	6	0
14	(Scotland)	MF	Kevin Moon	2	0	0	0	0	0	2	0
15	(Northern Ireland)	GK	Alan Mannus	0	0	0	0	0	0	0	0
16	(Scotland)	MF	David Robertson	1	0	0	0	0	0	1	0
17	(Scotland)	FW	Sean Higgins	0	0	0	0	0	0	0	0
18	(Scotland)	DF	David McCracken	3	0	0	0	0	0	3	0
19	(England)	FW	Carl Finnigan	2	0	0	0	0	0	2	0
20	(Scotland)	MF	Jamie Adams	4	0	0	0	1	0	5	0
21	(Spain)	FW	Francisco Sandaza	7	1	0	0	1	0	8	1
22	(Scotland)	MF	Willie Gibson	0	0	0	0	1	0	1	0
22	(England)	FW	Kudus Oyenuga	0	0	0	0	0	0	0	0
23	(Canada)	FW	Marcus Haber	1	0	0	0	0	0	1	0
24	(Republic of Ireland)	DF	Graham Gartland	0	0	0	0	0	0	0	0
24	(England)	MF	Jack Compton	0	0	0	0	0	0	0	0
26	(Scotland)	MF	Liam Caddis	0	0	0	0	0	0	0	0
27	(Scotland)	FW	Stevie May	0	0	0	0	0	0	0	0
45	(Scotland)	DF	Michael Hart	0	0	0	0	0	0	0	0
46	(Scotland)	FW	James Keatings	0	0	0	0	0	0	0	0
47	(Scotland)	FW	Derek Riordan	0	0	0	0	0	0	0	0

== Team statistics ==
=== League table ===
Pos	Team	Pld	W	D	L	GF	GA	GD	Pts	Qualification or relegation
4	Dundee United	38	16	11	11	62	50	+12	59	Qualification for the Europa League third qualifying round
5	Heart of Midlothian	38	15	7	16	45	43	+2	52	Qualification for the Europa League play-off round (Note: Hearts qualified for the Europa League as 2011–12 Scottish Cup winners. Since they finished fifth in the league, the sixth-placed team, St Johnstone, also qualified for the Europa League.)
6	St Johnstone	38	14	8	16	43	50	−7	50	Qualification for the Europa League second qualifying round
7	Kilmarnock	38	11	14	13	44	61	−17	47	
8	St Mirren	38	9	16	13	39	51	−12	43	

Source: SPFL Archive
Rules for classification: 1) points; 2) goal difference; 3) number of goals scored.

== Transfers ==
St Johnstone's first significant move in the close season was to release nine first-team players, most of whom were forwards. David Robertson became their first signing during the close season, being brought in from Dundee United. He was followed by Sean Higgins from Dundee and Callum Davidson from Preston North End, all arriving on free transfers. The departures continued, however, with the news that Danny Grainger had joined Hearts and Michael Duberry was leaving to return to England.

=== Players in ===
Player	From	Fee
(Scotland) David Robertson	(Scotland) Dundee United	Free
(Scotland) Sean Higgins	(Scotland) Dundee	Free
(Scotland) Callum Davidson	(England) Preston North End	Free
(Scotland) Frazer Wright	(Scotland) Kilmarnock	Free
(Scotland) David McCracken	(England) Brentford	Free
(England) Carl Finnigan	(Scotland) Falkirk	Free
(Republic of Ireland) Cillian Sheridan	(Bulgaria) CSKA Sofia	Loan
(Northern Ireland) Alan Mannus	(Republic of Ireland) Shamrock Rovers	Free
(Canada) Marcus Haber	(England) West Bromwich Albion	Free
(Spain) Francisco Sandaza	(England) Brighton & Hove Albion	Free
(England) Alistair Worby	(England) Doncaster Rovers	Free
(Scotland) Willie Gibson	(England) Crawley Town	Loan
(Wales) Jack Compton	(Scotland) Falkirk	Loan
(England) Lee Croft	(England) Derby County	Loan
(Scotland) James Keatings	(Scotland) Celtic	Loan
(England) Kudus Oyenuga	(England) Tottenham Hotspur	Loan
(Scotland) Michael Hart	(Scotland) Hibernian	Free
(Scotland) Derek Riordan	(China) Shaanxi Chan-Ba	Free

=== Players out ===
Player	To	Fee
(Scotland) Graeme Smith	(Scotland) St Mirren	Free
(Republic of Ireland) Andy Jackson	(Scotland) Greenock Morton	Free
(Scotland) Peter MacDonald	(Scotland) Greenock Morton	Free
(Scotland) Kevin Rutkiewicz	(Scotland) Dunfermline Athletic	Free
(Trinidad and Tobago) Collin Samuel	(England) Luton Town	Free
(Jamaica) Cleveland Taylor	(England) Burton Albion	Free
(England) Jordan Robertson	(England) Scunthorpe United	Free
(Australia) Danny Invincibile	(Cyprus) Ermis Aradippou	Free
(Scotland) Scott Dobie	Free agent	Free
(England) Danny Grainger	(Scotland) Hearts	Free
(England) Michael Duberry	(England) Oxford United	Free
(Scotland) Jonathan Lindsay	(Scotland) Partick Thistle	Free
(Scotland) Neil Duffy	(Scotland) Peterhead	Free
(Scotland) Zander Clark	(Scotland) Elgin City	Loan
(Scotland) Stephen Reynolds	(Scotland) Raith Rovers	Loan
(Scotland) Mark Durnan	(Scotland) Stranraer	Loan
(Scotland) Liam Caddis	(Scotland) Arbroath	Loan
(Scotland) Stevie May	(Scotland) Alloa Athletic	Loan
(Republic of Ireland) Graham Gartland	(Republic of Ireland) Shamrock Rovers	Free
(Scotland) Mark Durnan	(Scotland) Elgin City	Loan
(England) Sam Parkin	(Scotland) Queen of the South	Free
(Scotland) Sean Higgins	(Scotland) Ayr United	Loan
(Scotland) Stephen Reynolds	Free agent	Free
(England) Carl Finnigan	(Scotland) Dundee	Loan
