= Steven Anderson =

Scottish footballer (born 1985)

Personal information
- Full name: Steven James Stuart Anderson
- Date of birth: 19 December 1985 (age 40)
- Place of birth: Edinburgh, Scotland
- Position: Defender

Team information
- Current team: Broxburn Athletic

Youth career
- 2001–2004: Dundee United

Senior career*
| Years | Team | Apps | (Gls) |
| 2004–2020 | St Johnstone | 364 | (15) |
| 2019 | → Partick Thistle (loan) | 13 | (2) |
| 2019–2020 | → Raith Rovers (loan) | 8 | (0) |
| 2020–2022 | Forfar Athletic | 20 | (2) |
| 2022–2023 | Berwick Rangers | 2 | (0) |
| 2023–2024 | Crossgates Primrose | 14 | (1) |
| 2024 | Broxburn Athletic | | |
- * Club domestic league appearances and goals as of 22:46, 8 May 2022 (UTC)

Steven James Stuart Anderson (born 19 December 1985) is a Scottish footballer who plays for Broxburn Athletic. He plays in central defence.

== Club career ==
=== Early career ===
Anderson's senior career in football began when he stepped up from Dalkeith Boys Club to sign for Dundee United in January 2001. Anderson progressed for three years at The Tangerines, where he impressed the Dundee United's academy and eventually became captain at one point. However, Anderson failed to make a first team breakthrough at the Tangerines that led him to be released by the club in the summer of 2004.

Anderson joined Rangers on trial, but the club decided against signing him. He then went on trial with St Johnstone and played in a reserve game against Forfar Athletic and in a First Division match against St Mirren on 21 August 2004. His performance convinced the Saints' manager John Conolly to sign Anderson on a contract until the end of the season. Along the way, he learned from Jim Weir and considered him as a mentor, stating: "I learned a lot from Jim. He used to have me out on the training ground on Tuesday and Thursday afternoons for extra training."

=== St Johnstone ===
==== Early career at St Johnstone ====
Seven days after signing for the Saints, Anderson made his professional football debut, starting the whole game, in a 1–0 win over Raith Rovers. Shortly after, he became a first team regular for St. Johnstone. However, Anderson received a straight red card for a foul on Hamed Sacko with 10 minutes left, as the club lose 1–0 against Raith Rovers. Upon his return from suspension, he scored his first goal for St Johnstone, in a 4–0 win over Partick Thistle on 4 December 2004. Anderson then scored his second goal of the season, in a 2–1 win over Raith Rovers on 12 March 2005. His contributions later helped the club avoid relegation, having finished eighth place in the league. In his first season as a professional footballer, he went on to make twenty–three appearances and scoring two times in all competitions. Following this, Anderson signed a new deal with the Saints to keep him for another season.

In the 2005–06 season, Anderson would receive more playing time under the new management of Owen Coyle. He went to finish his second season, making twenty–eight appearances in all competitions. When the 2005–06 season was concluded, Anderson signed a new contract with St Johnstone.

In the 2006–07 season, Anderson continued to be a first team regular under manager Coyle, where he developed further as a defender. He was part of the starting eleven for St Johnstone when the Saints won 2–0 victory over Rangers at Ibrox to reach the semi-finals of the Scottish League Cup, giving the club their first win over the Glasgow club at Ibrox in 35 years. However in the second–half of the season, Anderson was out on two separate occasions with suspension, including a second bookable offence against Partick Thistle on 14 March 2007. He helped St Johnstone reached the semi-finals of the Scottish Cup thanks to away wins against SPL clubs Falkirk and Motherwell, but lost 2–1 to Celtic at Hampden in the semi-final. At the end of the 2006 –07 season, Anderson went on to make thirty–two appearances in all competitions. Following this, he signed another new one-year contract with the club.

The 2007–08 season saw the departure of manager Coyle and was succeeded by Derek McInnes Anderson continued to remain a first team regular despite facing competitions. For his performance, he signed an extended contract on a two-year deal with St Johnstone. Anderson started in the Scottish Challenge Cup final and played 80 minutes before being substituted, as he helped the Saints beat Dunfermline Athletic to win the Scottish Challenge Cup. At the end of the 2007–08 season, Anderson made twenty–eight appearances in all competitions.

Ahead of the 2008–09 season, Anderson suffered an ankle injury in a pre-season friendly., causing him to the start of the season. On 23 August 2008 he returned to the starting line–up, losing 4–0 against Partick Thistle. Upon returning from injury, Anderson's first team opportunities were limited as he was behind Kevin Rutkiewicz, Stuart McCaffrey, Gary Irvine and Graham Gartland for a first team place. But Anderson was able to prove himself when he was fit enough for a place on the bench and came on to good effect in matches against Dunfermline Athletic and Ross County as a substitute. However, Anderson suffered ankle injury and had to be substituted in the 61st minute, as St Johnstone won 1–0 against Clyde on 27 December 2008. However, he suffered an ankle injury that kept him out for three months. On 4 April 2009 Anderson returned injury, coming on as a 74th-minute substitute in a 1–1 draw against Partick Thistle. Anderson was part of St Johnstone's promotion squad when the club secured promotion to the Scottish Premier League after beating Greenock Morton to end their seven-year stint in the First Division. On the last game of the season, he scored his first goal for St Johnstone in four years, in a 4–0 win over Airdrieonians. At the end of the 2008–09 season, Anderson made seventeen appearances and scoring once in all competitions.

==== Playing in the Scottish Premiership ====
At the start of the 2009–10 season, Anderson struggled to earn his place back in the first team, and didn't make his first appearance until on 22 September 2009 against Hibernian in the last 16 of the Scottish League Cup, where he started the whole game, in a 3–1 win. A week later on 3 October 2009, Anderson scored his Scottish Premier League debut with a header, in a 2–0 against Hamilton Academical. He scored again in the quarter final of the Scottish League Cup, in a 2–1 win against Dundee United. His return form in the first team led to manager McInnes giving him more playing time and flourish playing alongside Michael Duberry. However, Anderson suffered a knee injury and was substituted in the 28th minute, as the club lose 2–1 against Motherwell on 6 March 2010. After missing four matches due to an injury, he made his return as a second–half substitute, in a 1–0 loss against Hamilton Academical on 27 March 2010. On 23 April 2010, Anderson signed a two-year contract extension with the Saints, keeping him until 2012. At the end of the 2009–10 season, he went on to make nineteen appearances and scoring two times in all competitions.

In the opening game of the 2010–11 season, however, Anderson received a straight red card for "scything" down on Suso Santana, in a 1–1 draw against Hearts. In a match against Dundee United on 26 September 2010, he came on as a 64th-minute-substitute and was given a second yellow card by the referee, Brian Winter in the space of 12 minutes, but it was not followed by a red and the defender remained on the pitch, causing the match to make national headlines. After the match, Anderson was later banned for three match by the Scottish Football Association's disciplinary committee. He had to wait until on 10 November 2010 to make his first team return, in a 4–0 loss against Motherwell. Anderson regained his first team place, forming a central defensive partnership with Michael Duberry for the rest of the 2010–11 season. Following the club's elimination in the semifinals of the Scottish Cup, both he and Duberry had to serve a suspension. After serving their suspension, both Anderson and Duberry returned to the starting line–up and helped the Saints kept three consecutive clean sheets in the last three league matches of the season. At the end of the 2010–11 season, Anderson went on to make thirty–two appearances in all competitions. For his performance, he was named as St Johnstone's Player of the Year.

Following the departure of his defensive partner Duberry, Anderson started his 2011–12 season, appearing in the first two league games, forming a centre–back partnership with Frazer Wright. After missing three match, he returned to the first team, coming on as a 78th-minute substitute, in a 0–0 draw against St Mirren on 10 September 2011. Following this, Anderson regained his first team place, continuing to be in a centre–back partnership with Frazer Wright. He made his 200th appearance for St Johnstone against Kilmarnock on 1 October 2011, only for him to score an own goal, as the club went on to win 2–1. Anderson then signed a two-year contract extension with the Saints, taking him to the end of the 2013–14 season. A few weeks after signing the new contract, he scored his first goal of the season, in a 5–1 loss against Dundee United. After the match, Anderson said he wasn't impressed with the result and described the defeat as "embarrassing". However, Anderson was out once again with a knee injury that he sustained, as the Saints were eliminated in the last 16 replay of the Scottish Cup against Hearts. On 28 March 2012 Anderson returned from injury, coming on as a late substitute in a 1–0 win against Inverness Caledonian Thistle. St Johnstone eventually qualified for a place in Europe despite finishing sixth place. At the end of the 2011–12 season, he made thirty–four appearances and scoring once in all competitions.

==== Ninth season at St Johnstone ====
Following the club's elimination in the UEFA Europa League, he continued to remain in the centre–back partnership with Frazer Wright. Along the way, Anderson also played in the right–back position in absence of Dave Mackay.

After missing one match against Celtic on 11 November 2012, Anderson returned to the starting line–up, in a 1–1 draw against Ross County. However, his return was short–lived when he received a straight red card for a foul on Lewis Guy before half time, as St Johnstone drew 1–1 with St Mirren. After serving a one match suspension, Anderson returned to the starting line–up against Cowdenbeath in the fourth round of the Scottish Cup and set up of the goals, in a 4–0 win. However, his return was short–lived once again when he suffered an injury that kept him out for two months.

On 11 February 2013 Anderson returned to the starting line–up, playing at right–back in a 3–1 win against Hibernian. He then made his 250th appearance for the Saints, coming on as a second–half substitute, in a 2–0 loss against Hearts on 5 March 2013. On the last game of the season, Anderson started the whole game against Motherwell and helped the Saints win 2–0 to seal third place finish in the league and qualify for Europe again. At the end of the 2012–13 season, he went on to make thirty–three appearances in all competitions.

==== Winning the Scottish Cup ====
The start of the 2013–14 season when Anderson played in both legs, winning 2–1 against Norwegian side Rosenberg in the UEFA Europa League second qualifying round. However, he played in both legs in the UEFA Europa League third qualifying round against Minsk as the club were eliminated on penalties following a 1–1 draw on aggregate. Following this, Anderson helped St Johnstone kept three consecutive clean sheets in the first three league matches of the season 2013. After the club lose 2–1 against Hibernian on 14 September 2013, he suffered a knock but quickly made a full recovery.

However in a match against Partick Thistle on 28 September 2013, Anderson was substituted in the 7th minute after "he slipped and suffered a painful hand injury as Kris Doolan raced in for Thistle's sixth-minute opener". After going to hospital, it was announced that Anderson would be out for up to eight weeks following a lengthy operation for a dislocated thumb. He later described the injury as "the absolute agony, the worst pain I've had." By early–December, Anderson recovered from injury and returned to training. IOn 29 December 2013 he returned to the starting line–up against Dundee United and helped the club kept a clean sheet, in a 3–0 win. In a match against Hearts on 18 January 2014, Anderson received a straight red card in the 21st minute after a foul on Dale Carrick to deny him a goal scoring opportunity, as the match finished 3–3. After the match, St Johnstone successfully appealed the decision, allowing Anderson to be free to play.

Following his return from injury, Anderson continued to remain in the centre–back partnership with Frazer Wright. On 8 March 2014, he scored his first goal of the season, in the Scottish Cup quarter final, in a 3–1 win over Raith Rovers. During the same month, Anderson was asked by the Courier if he would choose between a top-six finish and Scottish Cup, he stated: "It would be a great achievement obviously to take St Johnstone into their first ever Scottish Cup final, but if you look at the start of the season you want to win silverware but the aim is to stay in this league and progress every season." The following month saw Anderson score two goals in two games against Kilmarnock and Dundee United.

On 17 May 2014, Anderson started in the Scottish Cup Final at Celtic Park against Dundee United and scored the first goal of the game, as St Johnstone won 2–0 to win the trophy for the first time. After the match, he dedicated the Scottish Cup win to the Saints owners (Geoff Brown and Steve Brown), saying: "They've run the club really well over the years and it was time they got their day. So it's great for them to get a bit of success. Every year we always think about getting a cup run." National newspaper The Herald said about his performance, saying: "Guided a header inside the post to open the scoring on the stroke of half-time and defended well throughout." At the end of the 2013–14 season, he made thirty–nine appearances and scoring four times in all competitions. Following this, Anderson signed a new contract with the club on a two-year deal.

==== Tenth season at St Johnstone ====
It was announced on 5 April 2014 that Anderson would be awarded a testimonial match for his 10 years of service to St.Johnstone. When his testimonial match took place against Hearts on 4 August 2014, he started the whole game, as the Saints went on to lose 4–0.

However, at the start of the 2014–15 season, Anderson suffered a hamstring injury that saw him miss both legs against Luzern in the UEFA Europa League second qualifying round against Luzern. He appeared twice as an unused substitute in the UEFA Europa League second qualifying round second leg against Spartak Trnava, as the Saints were eliminated from the Europa League. Following the club's elimination from the tournament, Anderson returned to the starting line–up, in a 2–1 win against Ross County in the opening league game of the season. Since returning from injury, Anderson continued to remain in the centre–back partnership with Frazer Wright.

On 4 October 2014 he scored his first goal of the season in a 2–1 defeat against St Mirren. After suffering a minor injury, Anderson quickly recovered and helped St Johnstone kept three consecutive clean sheets in the league between 6 December 2014 and 20 December 2014. He had to wait until on 17 January 2015 to score his second goal of the season, in a 2–0 win over Partick Thistle After the match, Anderson said: "The onus should be on the strikers to score but the defenders have chipped. But our main job is to get a clean sheet and we've done that so I'm as happy with that as the goal."

Anderson, once again, helped the Saints kept three consecutive clean sheets in the league between 21 February 2015 and 4 March 2015. Two weeks later on 21 March 2015, he scored his third goal of the season, in a 2–0 win over St Mirren. Anderson started in all matches until receiving a suspension for accumulating five yellow cards. After serving a one match suspension, he returned to the starting line–up, in a 1–1 draw against Inverness Caledonian Thistle on 2 May 2015. On the last game of the season, Anderson led St Johnstone beat Aberdeen 1–0 to help the club qualify for the UEFA Europa League for the third year running. At the end of the 2014–15 season, he went on to make forty–one appearances and scoring three times in all competitions. For his performance, Anderson was awarded the We Are Perth 'Legend' at the Saints' award ceremony.

==== Record Breaking Appearance ====
After appearing as an unused substitute in the first leg of the UEFA Europa League first qualifying round against Alashkert, he made his first appearance of the 2015–16 season, in a 2–1 win in the return leg, only for St Johnstone to be eliminated from the tournament on away goals. During the match, however, he suffered a cheekbone injury after clashing with Siarhei Usenia and had to be substituted in the 72nd minute, resulting in him being taken to hospital. Initially it was feared Anderson had suffered a broken cheekbone, but following hospital tests, it was revealed to just be badly swollen. As a result, he was out for two months.

On 19 September 2015 Anderson returned to the first team from injury, coming on as a second–half substitute in a 2–1 loss against Kilmarnock. After appearing in the next four matches as an unused substitute, due to Tommy Wright being wary of reintroducing him to the first team squad too quickly, he returned to the starting line–up against Inverness Caledonian Thistle and helped the club kept a clean sheet, in a 1–0 win on 24 October 2015. However, his return was short–lived when Anderson suffered ankle injury that saw him out for one match. He made his return to the starting line–up from injury, in a 3–0 loss against Celtic on 13 December 2015. Following his return, Anderson regained his first team place, forming a central defensive partnership with Joe Shaughnessy.

He then made his 350th appearance for the Saints, in a 1–0 loss against Kilmarnock on 9 January 2016 in the fourth round of the Scottish Cup. A month later on 6 February 2016, Anderson scored his first goal of the season, in a 4–3 loss against Aberdeen. Following the injury of Mackay, he captained St Johnstone for five matches between 27 February 2016 and 19 March 2016. With Anderson's chances of reaching the club's most appearance becomes imminent, he equalled Alan Main's record against Ross County on 16 March 2016, only for him to give away the penalty, in a 1–1 draw. In a follow–up match against Hearts, Anderson officially became the player with most appearances for St Johnstone, breaking Alan Main's previous record of 361 to become the club's new all-time appearance holder, as St Johnstone won 3–0.

However, he suffered a hamstring injury that saw him out for two matches. But Anderson returned to the starting line–up against Aberdeen and set up the second goal of the game, in a 3–0 win on 22 April 2016. At the end of the 2015–16 season, he went on to make twenty–eight appearances and scoring once in all competitions. Following this, Anderson signed a new contract to commit himself to the club, keeping him until 2018.

==== Becoming a Captain ====
The start of the 2016–17 season saw Anderson helped St Johnstone progress through the group stage of the Scottish League Cup. He also scored his first goal of the season, in a 4–0 win against Stirling Albion in the Scottish League Cup. However, Anderson missed one match due to a hip injury. But he made his return to the starting line–up, in a 2–1 loss against Inverness Caledonian Thistle on 27 August 2016. Anderson scored his second goal of the season in a follow–up match, in a 2–0 win against Partick Thistle. He was appointed as the Saints' captain on 21 September, following the retirement of Dave Mackay. Upon receiving it, he described the captaincy as an honour.

Anderson continued to be in a first team regular as captain and to remain in the centre–back partnership with Shaughnessy. His performance was praised by manager Tommy Wright for "This return form in recent weeks after an early season dip", though he downplayed the praise. He scored his third goal of the season (also his 200th top-flight appearance the club), in a 2–1 win against Dundee on 23 October 2016. However, Anderson suffered an illness that saw him out for one match. He made his return from his illness against Kilmarnock on 23 December 2016 and helped the club kept a clean sheet, in a 1–0 win. In a follow–up match, during a1–1 draw with Rangers, Anderson was struck by Rob Kiernan, which was caught on live by the broadcasting and the officials didn't take action at the time. After the match, he confirmed that Kiernan did punch him during the match. For this, Kiernan was offered a two-match suspension for violent conduct by the Scottish Football Association, however he chose to contest the charge and it was ultimately dismissed by disciplinary tribunal on 12 January 2017. However. in early February, Anderson missed one match due to a tonsillitis. He made his return to the starting line–up, in a 2–1 win against Ross County on 18 February 2017.

Two weeks later on 1 March 2017, he scored his fourth goal of the season, in a 3–2 loss against Rangers. However, Anderson suffered a knee injury that kept him out for a month. On 29 April 2017 he returned from injury and kept a clean sheet in a 2–0 win against Aberdeen. In a follow–up match against Celtic, Anderson made 400th appearance for St Johnstone, in a 4–1 loss. Despite missing one more match, due to suspension, his contributions saw the Saints qualify for the UEFA Europa League next season. By the end of the 2016–17 season, he had made 34 appearances and scored four goals.

==== Thirteen season at St Johnstone ====
However at the start of the 2017–18 season, Anderson missed both legs of the UEFA Europa League first qualifying round against FK Riteriai, as St Johnstone lost 3–1 on aggregate and was eliminated from the tournament. He made his first appearance of the season, in a 2–1 win against Kilmarnock in the opening game of the season. In a follow–up match against Partick Thistle in the last 16 of the Scottish League Cup, Anderson made his 400th appearance for the Saints, in a 3–0 loss and the club was eliminated from the tournament. When both clubs met again in the league on 20 August 2017, he got their revenge for St Johnstone by setting up the only goal of the game for Michael O'Halloran to win the match. Since the start of the 2017–18 season, Anderson started in the first nine league matches as captain.

However, in a match against Rangers on 13 October 2017, he received a second bookable offence, in a 3–0 loss. After serving a one match suspension, Anderson returned to the starting line–up against Ross County on 24 October 2017 and helped the club kept a clean sheet, in a 0–0 draw. Following his return, he lost his captaincy role to Shaughnessy, but continued to remain in the centre–back partnership in the first team nevertheless. In a match against Celtic on 4 November 2017, Anderson was at fault when he scored an own goal, in a 4–0 loss. His seventeen league starts soon came to an end in early–March when Anderson missed one match, due to a minor Achilles injury. He made his return to the starting line–up against Dundee on 10 March 2018 and helped St Johnstone win 4–0 win.

A month later on 28 April 2018, Anderson made his 250th top-flight appearance for St Johnstone, starting the whole game, in a 1–1 draw against Partick Thistle. After the match, he said: "It's another milestone for me and hopefully there are many more to come." Anderson then scored his first goal (and last goal for the Saints), in a 5–1 win against Motherwell on 5 May 2018. At the end of the 2017–18 season, he made thirty–six appearances and scoring once in all competitions. Following this, Anderson signed a two–year contract extension with the club, keeping him until 2020. After signing a contract with St Johnstone, he said: "I'm delighted to get my future sorted out. It was a no-brainer after listening to the gaffer and his plans for the team going forward. I am getting older so it is just a matter of time before they take my place but there is life in the old dog yet. I am as fit as I have ever been and luckily I have managed to steer clear of serious knee injuries down the years. My worse injuries have been to my eye socket and my thumb."

==== Decline and Departure ====
The start of the 2018–19 season saw Anderson made three starts for St Johnstone. However, he suffered ankle injury that saw him miss one match, although the injury was not serious. Upon returning to the first team, Anderson struggled to get more playing time, due to Shaughnessy and Jason Kerr. He only made more one appearance upon returning from injury, coming on as a second-half substitute, in a 6–0 loss against Celtic on 7 October 2018. However, his return was short–lived when Anderson suffered a knee injury that kept him out for a month. During the 2018–19 season, Anderson only made four appearances for the Saints.

Anderson made his only appearance of the 2019–20 season, losing 2–1 against Ross County in the group stage of the Scottish League Cup. He then returned from a loan spell at Raith Rovers to recover before the season was curtailed because of the COVID-19 pandemic. At the end of the 2019–20 season, Anderson left the club after 16 years, which had made 439 appearances for the club in all competitions.

==== Partick Thistle (loan) ====
On 29 January 2019, Anderson was loaned to Partick Thistle for the rest of the 2018–19 season.

He scored on his debut for the Jags, in a 2–1 win against Inverness Caledonian Thistle on 2 February 2019. In a follow–up match against East Fife in the fifth round of the Scottish Cup, Anderson scored again, in a 1–0 win to advance to the next round. After the match, his performance was praised by manager Gary Caldwell. Since joining Partick Thistle, he became a first team regular for the rest of the season. Anderson then scored his third goal for the club, in a 3–0 win against Greenock Morton on 30 March 2019. During his loan spell with the Jags, he made 16 appearances, scoring 3 goals in all competitions. Following this, Anderson returned to his parent club.

==== Raith Rovers (loan) ====
Anderson joined Raith Rovers on a season long loan on 6 September 2019. Upon being loaned out, manager Tommy Wright said: "It's best for Steven to go out and play. We have been talking about that for a long period of time. Ideally, would a manager want to keep someone of his experience about the place – of course. It's the same this time round. I can't guarantee him regular football so it's best for him in the long run."

The next day, he made his debut for the club, starting the whole game, in a 2–0 win against Falkirk in the Scottish Challenge Cup. Anderson soon became a first team regular for Raith Rovers, forming a centre–back partnership with Kyle Benedictus and Iain Davidson. This last until he received a second bookable offence, in a 2–2 draw against Clyde on 19 October 2019. On 30 November 2019, however, Anderson suffered an injury and was substituted at half time during a 1–0 win against Montrose. As a result, he was out for two months. By February, Anderson returned to his parent club, which he made thirteen appearances in all competitions.

=== Forfar Athletic ===
On 14 July 2020, Anderson signed for Scottish League One club Forfar Athletic on a two-year deal.

However, his start to his career at the club suffered a setback when he missed the first two months of the season, due to injuries. Anderson made his debut for Forfar Athletic, only for him to be substituted in the 9th minute due to suffering an achilles problem, in a 2–0 loss against Partick Thistle on 12 December 2020, in what turns out to be his only appearance of the season. After the match, he was eventually out for the rest of the 2020–21 season. Anderson later credited the club's physio for saving his career, as he spent nine months rehabilitating his injury and fitness.

The start of the 2021–22 season saw Anderson continue recover from his achilles problem. He made his first appearance of the season, starting a match and played 64 minutes, in a 1–0 win against Formartine United in the first round of the Scottish Challenge Cup. Following his return from injury, Anderson became a first team regular, forming a centre–back partnership with Andy Munro. He scored his first goal for the club, which turned out to be a winning goal, in a 3–2 win against Albion Rovers on 4 December 2021. Two weeks later on 17 December 2021, Anderson scored his second goal of the season, in a 4–0 win against Edinburgh City. However, during a 2–2 draw against Annan Athletic on 15 January 2022, he suffered a shoulder injury and was substituted in the 56th minute. After the match, Anderson never played for Forfar Athletic for the rest of the season. At the end of the 2021–22 season, he went on to make twenty–three appearances and scoring two times in all competitions. Following the club, the club announced Anderson's departure.

=== Berwick Rangers ===
On 7 May 2022, Anderson signed a one-year contract with Lowland League side Berwick Rangers, with the further possibility of a one-year contract extension.

He made his debut for the club, starting the whole game, in a 6–0 loss against Heart of Midlothian B team in the opening game of the season. In a follow–up match against Celtic B team, Anderson captained Berwick Rangers for the first time, in a 1–0 win, in what turns out to be his last appearance for the club. However, his season ended when he ruptured his achilles tendon.

=== Crossgates Primrose ===
On 31 May 2023, Anderson joined Crossgates Primrose after leaving Berwick Rangers. By the time he left the club, Anderson made fourteen appearances and scoring once in all competitions.

=== Broxburn Athletic ===
On 6 January 2024, Anderson signed with East of Scotland Football League team Broxburn Athletic until the end of the 2023–24 season.

On the same day, he played his first match for Broxburn away to Tynecastle in a 3–2 victory. Anderson played in a majority of Broxburn's matches until the end of the season, eventually winning the East of Scotland League Premier Division and securing promotion to the Lowland League. On 4 August 2024, Broxburn announced his departure from the club.

== Style of play ==
Throughout his time at St. Johnstone, Anderson mostly plays in right–back, left–back and even midfield positions. Thised last until he became the club's first choice centre–back position. This earned him nicknamed as "Victor Meldrew of Scottish football", a name that Anderson agreed with because of his grumpy personality. Manager Caldwell said about him: "I think I'd describe him as old school in the way that he defends. Anderson just wants to head things and put in tackles but he's also smart enough to know when the right time is to do that which you saw a couple of times today. Anderson is someone who young centre-halves should look up to and try to learn from. He's been very successful in his career and uses his experience to command the defence which helps those around him." Anderson agreed that his playing style was old school, saying: "I heads the ball, defend right, first and foremost, and make sure people roundabout can play. Saturday was my kind of game."

However, Anderson was accused by Rangers player Vladimir Weiss of being overly physical following St Johnstone's 2–1 defeat against Rangers on 28 August 2010. Responding to Weiss' criticism, he defended his actions saying that he was simply defending.

Despite this, Anderson was viewed highly regards as a St Johnstone legend by managers, players and supporters. Teammate Danny Swanson felt that Anderson should be included in the Scotland squad, pointing out that Gordon Greer was called up at 33 years old.

== Personal life ==
Growing up, Anderson was a boyhood Hibernian supporter, due to being from Dalkeith. He is married to his wife, Sarah, and together, they have one child.

Outside of football, Anderson works for the Fife Council as an environmental health technical officer.

== Career statistics ==
As of match played 15 January 2022

Appearances and goals by club, season and competition
| Club | Season | League | | | Scottish Cup | | League Cup | | Other | | Total | |
| Club | Season | Division | Apps | Goals | Apps | Goals | Apps | Goals | Apps | Goals | Apps | Goals |
|---|---|---|---|---|---|---|---|---|---|---|---|---|
| St Johnstone | 2004–05 | Scottish First Division | 20 | 2 | 0 | 0 | 0 | 0 | 3 (Note: Appearances in the Scottish Challenge Cup) | 0 | 23 | 2 |
| St Johnstone | 2005–06 | Scottish First Division | 23 (Note: Includes one appearance not recorded on Soccerbase. "St Mirren 0–0 Saints". St Johnstone F.C. 17 December 2005.) | 0 | 1 | 0 | 1 | 0 | 3 | 0 | 28 | 0 |
| St Johnstone | 2006–07 | Scottish First Division | 24 | 0 | 3 | 0 | 3 | 0 | 2 | 0 | 32 | 0 |
| St Johnstone | 2007–08 | Scottish First Division | 28 | 0 | 4 (Note: Includes one appearance not recorded on Soccerbase. "Saints 3–1 Raith Rovers". St Johnstone F.C. 15 January 2008.) | 0 | 1 | 0 | 5 | 0 | 38 | 0 |
| St Johnstone | 2008–09 | Scottish First Division | 15 | 1 | 0 | 0 | 1 | 0 | 1 (Note: Includes one Scottish Challenge Cup appearance not recorded on Soccerbase. "Saints lose grip on Challenge Cup". St Johnstone F.C. 26 July 2008. Archived from the original on 10 February 2015.) | 0 | 17 | 1 |
| St Johnstone | 2009–10 | Scottish Premier League | 17 | 1 | 0 | 0 | 2 | 1 | — | | 19 | 2 |
| St Johnstone | 2010–11 | Scottish Premier League | 25 | 0 | 5 | 0 | 2 | 0 | — | | 32 | 0 |
| St Johnstone | 2011–12 | Scottish Premier League | 29 | 1 | 3 | 0 | 2 | 0 | — | | 34 | 1 |
| St Johnstone | 2012–13 | Scottish Premier League | 30 | 0 | 1 | 0 | 2 | 0 | 0 | 0 | 33 | 0 |
| St Johnstone | 2013–14 | Scottish Premiership | 29 | 2 | 4 | 2 | 2 | 0 | 4 (Note: Appearances in the UEFA Europa League) | 0 | 39 | 4 |
| St Johnstone | 2014–15 | Scottish Premiership | 37 | 3 | 2 | 0 | 2 | 0 | 0 | 0 | 41 | 3 |
| St Johnstone | 2015–16 | Scottish Premiership | 24 | 1 | 1 | 0 | 2 | 0 | 1 | 0 | 28 | 1 |
| St Johnstone | 2016–17 | Scottish Premiership | 26 | 3 | 2 | 0 | 6 | 1 | — | | 34 | 4 |
| St Johnstone | 2017–18 | Scottish Premiership | 34 | 1 | 1 | 0 | 1 | 0 | 0 | 0 | 36 | 1 |
| St Johnstone | 2018–19 | Scottish Premiership | 3 | 0 | 0 | 0 | 1 | 0 | — | | 4 | 0 |
| St Johnstone | 2019–20 | Scottish Premiership | 0 | 0 | 0 | 0 | 1 | 0 | — | | 1 | 0 |
| St Johnstone | Total | | 364 | 15 | 27 | 2 | 29 | 2 | 19 | 0 | 439 | 19 |
| Partick Thistle (loan) | 2018–19 | Scottish Championship | 13 | 2 | 3 | 1 | 0 | 0 | 0 | 0 | 16 | 3 |
| Raith Rovers (loan) | 2019–20 | Scottish League One | 8 | 0 | 1 | 0 | 0 | 0 | 3 | 0 | 12 | 0 |
| Forfar Athletic | 2020–21 | Scottish League One | 1 | 0 | 0 | 0 | 0 | 0 | 0 | 0 | 1 | 0 |
| Forfar Athletic | 2021–22 | Scottish League Two | 19 | 2 | 2 | 0 | 0 | 0 | 2 | 0 | 23 | 2 |
| Forfar Athletic | Total | | 20 | 2 | 2 | 0 | 0 | 0 | 2 | 0 | 24 | 2 |
| Career total | | | 405 | 19 | 33 | 3 | 29 | 2 | 24 | 0 | 491 | 24 |

== Honours ==
St Johnstone

- Scottish Challenge Cup: 2007–08
- Scottish First Division: 2008–09
- Scottish Cup: 2013–14

Broxburn Athletic

- East of Scotland League Premier Division: 2023–24
