= 2014 Scottish Cup final =

2014 Scottish Cup Final
- Official programme cover
- Event: 2013–14 Scottish Cup
St Johnstone	Dundee United
2	0
- Date: 17 May 2014
- Venue: Celtic Park, Glasgow
- Man of the Match: Steven Anderson
- Referee: Craig Thomson
- Attendance: 47,345

The 2014 Scottish Cup Final was the 129th final of the Scottish Cup, the most prestigious knockout football competition in Scotland. The match took place at Celtic Park on 17 May 2014 and was contested by Dundee United and St Johnstone. The usual venue, Hampden Park, was unavailable because it was being refurbished for the 2014 Commonwealth Games. As of 2026, the 2014 final was the last to be played away from Hampden.

After winning the game 2–0, St Johnstone entered the 2014–15 UEFA Europa League in the Second Qualifying Round.

== Route to the final ==
=== St. Johnstone FC ===
Round	Opposition	Score
Fourth round	Livingston	2–0
Fifth round	Forfar Athletic	4–0
Quarter-final	Raith Rovers	3–1
Semi-final	Aberdeen	2–1

St. Johnstone entered the competition in the Fourth round. They began their campaign against Livingston at McDiarmid Park. Stevie May and Sanel Jahić scored the goals that sealed the Saints' passage into the next round. St Johnstone then took on Forfar Athletic in Forfar, winning 4–0, courtesy of goals from May, Frazer Wright, Michael O'Halloran and James Dunne.

In the quarter-final St Johnstone were drawn away again, against Raith Rovers. Goals from Gary McDonald, Nigel Hasselbaink and Steven Anderson sealed a 3–1 victory.

In the semi-final at Ibrox on 13 April, St Johnstone faced Aberdeen. A double from May ended Saints semi-final hoodoo and sent St Johnstone to their first-ever Scottish Cup final.

=== Dundee United ===
Round	Opposition	Score
Fourth round	Kilmarnock	5–2
Fifth round	St Mirren	2–1
Quarter-final	Inverness CT	5–0
Semi-final	Rangers	3–1

Dundee United entered the competition in the Fourth round. They began their campaign against Kilmarnock at Tannadice. Andrew Robertson scored twice, with goals from Stuart Armstrong, Brian Graham and Gary Mackay-Steven sealing the Terrors' passage into the next round. Dundee United then took on St Mirren. United won 2–1, courtesy of goals from Ryan Gauld and Nadir Çiftçi.

In the quarter-final Dundee United were drawn against Inverness CT. Çiftçi scored twice, with goals from Gavin Gunning, Mackay-Steven and Armstrong sealing a 5–0 victory. In the semi-final at Ibrox on 12 April, Dundee United faced Rangers. Goals from Armstrong, Mackay-Steven and Çiftçi sent Dundee United to the final for the first time since 2010.

== Pre-match ==
This was St Johnstone's first appearance in the Scottish Cup Final, while it was Dundee United's tenth appearance. United had previously won two Scottish Cups (in 1994 and 2010), and have been beaten in seven finals. The most notable meeting of the two clubs in the Scottish Cup until now was in the 1990–91 Scottish Cup, when Dundee United won 2–1 in a semi-final at East End Park and advanced to the 1991 Scottish Cup Final.

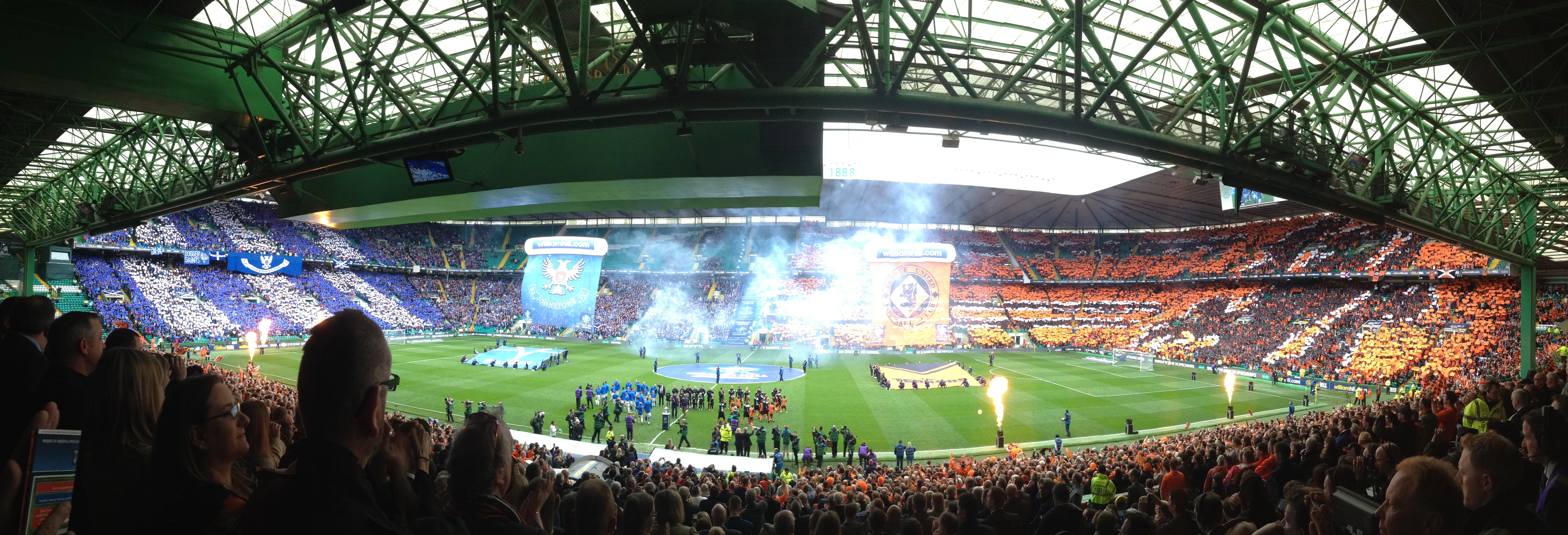
Pre-match ceremonies at Celtic Park

For the first time in its history, the Scottish Cup Final was played on a Sunday in 2013. This was done to comply with UEFA regulations which prohibit televised matches being played on the same day as the UEFA Champions League Final. As the 2014 UEFA Champions League Final was being played on a different weekend, this meant that the Scottish Cup Final could again be played on a Saturday.

The redevelopment of Hampden Park for use as the main athletics stadium in the 2014 Commonwealth Games meant that the traditional home of the Scottish Cup Final was not available. As with the 2014 Scottish League Cup Final, the Scottish Football Association opted to use Celtic Park instead. 26,000 tickets were sold on the first full day of sales. St Johnstone received an initial allocation of 11,300 tickets, but almost all of these were sold after the first day of public sale. Dundee United had sold about 16,000 tickets before commencing their public sale of tickets. A JustGiving appeal to fund tickets for poorer fans raised over £14,000 within 12 hours of it being launched.

A day before the final Dundee United announced they had broken their own record of ticket sales for a final by selling over 28,000 tickets. St Johnstone, meanwhile, sold over 15,000 tickets.

The match was shown live on BBC Scotland and on Sky Sports.

== Match details ==
17 May 2014
15:00 BST

St Johnstone	2–0	Dundee United
Anderson 45+1'; MacLean 84'	Report

Celtic Park, Glasgow
Attendance: 47,345
Referee: Craig Thomson

St Johnstone	Dundee United

GK	1	(Northern Ireland) Alan Mannus
RB	2	(Scotland) Dave Mackay (c)
CB	5	(Scotland) Frazer Wright
CB	6	(Scotland) Steven Anderson
LB	24	(Scotland) Brian Easton
RM	7	(Scotland) Chris Millar
CM	10	(Scotland) David Wotherspoon		(substituted off) 86'
CM	12	(England) James Dunne	(yellow card) 49'
LM	29	(Scotland) Michael O'Halloran		(substituted off) 73'
RS	9	(Scotland) Steven MacLean	(yellow card) 85'
LS	17	(Scotland) Stevie May	(yellow card) 53'
Substitutes:
GK	15	(England) Steve Banks
DF	19	(Scotland) Gary Miller
MF	4	(Republic of Ireland) Patrick Cregg
MF	8	(Scotland) Gary McDonald		(substituted on) 86'
MF	22	(England) Lee Croft		(substituted on) 73'
FW	11	(Suriname) Nigel Hasselbaink
FW	25	(Scotland) Chris Iwelumo
Manager:
(Northern Ireland) Tommy Wright

GK	1	(Poland) Radosław Cierzniak
RB	12	(Scotland) Keith Watson
CB	2	(Republic of Ireland) Seán Dillon (c)
CB	5	(Republic of Ireland) Gavin Gunning	(yellow card) 89'
LB	26	(Scotland) Andy Robertson
CDM	6	(Northern Ireland) Paul Paton	(yellow card) 52'	(substituted off) 77'
CDM	8	(Scotland) John Rankin
RM	18	(Scotland) Ryan Dow
CAM	10	(Scotland) Stuart Armstrong
LM	11	(Scotland) Gary Mackay-Steven		(substituted off) 64'
FW	21	(Turkey) Nadir Çiftçi	(yellow card) 90+3'
Substitutes:
GK	25	(Scotland) Marc McCallum
DF	16	(Scotland) Mark Wilson
DF	20	(Scotland) John Souttar
MF	27	(Senegal) Morgaro Gomis
MF	19	(Scotland) Ryan Gauld		(substituted on) 64'
FW	9	(Scotland) Brian Graham		(substituted on) 77'
FW	29	(France) Farid El Alagui
Manager:
(Scotland) Jackie McNamara

Man of the Match: Steven Anderson (St Johnstone)

Match officials

- Referee:
  - Craig Thomson
- Assistant referees:
  - Graham Chambers
  - Michael Banks
- Additional assistant referees:
  - Kevin Clancy
  - Alan Muir
- Fourth official:
  - Stephen Finnie

Match rules

- 90 minutes
- 30 minutes of extra time if necessary
- Penalty shoot-out if scores still level
- Seven named substitutes
- Maximum of three substitutions

== See also ==
- Tayside derby
