= Sanel Jahić =

Bosnian football coach and former player (born 1981)

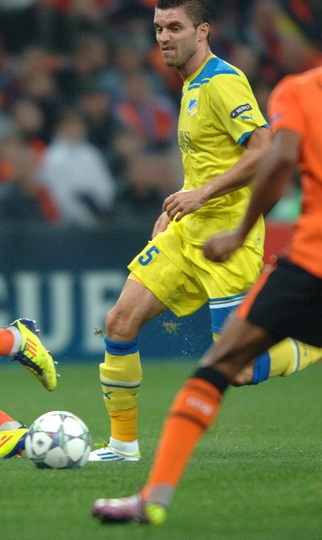
- Jahić playing for APOEL in 2011

Personal information
- Date of birth: 10 December 1981 (age 44)
- Place of birth: Strasbourg, France
- Height: 1.85 m (6 ft 1 in)
- Position: Defender

Team information
- Current team: Željezničar (youth team coach)

Youth career
- Strasbourg
- Sochaux

Senior career*
Years	Team	Apps	(Gls)
1999–2001	Sochaux	0	(0)
2001–2003	Željezničar	15	(0)
2004–2005	Las Palmas	25	(3)
2005–2006	Mérida	17	(1)
2006–2007	Željezničar	37	(19)
2007–2009	Aris	31	(2)
2009–2011	AEK Athens	42	(1)
2011–2012	APOEL	11	(0)
2012–2013	Karabükspor	20	(3)
2013–2014	St Johnstone	5	(0)
2014–2015	Grasshopper	27	(0)
2015–2016	Levadiakos	19	(0)
2016–2017	Željezničar	5	(0)
Total		254	(29)

International career
2001–2002	Bosnia and Herzegovina U21	6	(0)
2008–2012	Bosnia and Herzegovina	23	(1)

Managerial career
- 2020–: Željezničar (youth team coach)
- * Club domestic league appearances and goals

Sanel Jahić (born 10 December 1981) is a Bosnian football coach and former player who currently works as a coach in the youth team of Bosnian Premier League club Željezničar.

Throughout his playing career, he was best known for being a utility player, capable of playing a wide number of positions. Although largely employed as a centre-back on club level, he has also played on the side of the field as a wingback for the Bosnia and Herzegovina national team, and has filled in as a defensive midfielder and as a right midfielder. Jahić has also had success as a striker, for a moment leading the Bosnian Premier League's scoring charts in the 2006–07 season.

Jahić began his senior career with Sochaux. In 2001 he moved to Željezničar where he stayed for two years. Later, he played for Las Palmas and Mérida in Spain. Jahić then returned to Željezničar in 2006, before joining Greek club Aris Thessaloniki in January 2008. Two years later he was transferred to AEK Athens. In the summer of 2011, Jahić signed with Cypriot club APOEL. With APOEL he participated in the UEFA Champions League group stages for the first time in his career and he helped his team to reach the last 16 of the competition. In January 2012, he moved to Turkish club Karabükspor. After Karabükspor, Jahić played for St Johnstone, Grasshopper and Levadiakos, before finishing his career at Željezničar in 2017.

== Club career ==
=== Early career ===
Jahić was born in Strasbourg. He grew up there and started playing football also. He played for youth squads of Strasbourg and Sochaux before moving to Bosnia and Herzegovina and joining Željezničar in 2001.

=== Return to Željezničar ===
Following two stints in Spain with Las Palmas and Mérida, Jahić returned to Željezničar. In one year at the club he scored 19 goals in 37 matches.

=== Aris Thessaloniki ===
In January 2008, Jahić moved to Aris Thessaloniki in Greece signing a two-year contract.

=== AEK Athens ===
In 2009, Jahić joined Aris's league rivals AEK Athens. After two years, the termination of his contract was agreed.

=== APOEL ===
On 22 June 2011, Jahić signed a two-year contract with Cypriot club APOEL. During his spell with APOEL, he helped his team to win the 2011 Cypriot Super Cup and reach the Quarter-finals of the 2011–12 UEFA Champions League. He appeared in four qualifying round matches and in all six group stage matches on APOEL's way to the quarter-finals of the Champions League, mainly as a substitute.

=== Karabükspor ===
In January 2012, Jahić moved to Turkish club Karabükspor for a transfer fee of €300,000, signing a two-and-a-half-year contract with the club. Jahić left Karabükspor at the end of the 2012–13 season.

=== St Johnstone ===
Jahić trained with Scottish Premiership club St Johnstone in October 2013. He signed a short-term contract with the club after they lost defenders Steven Anderson and Frazer Wright to injury and suspension respectively. On 6 January 2014, Jahić left St Johnstone after his contract expired.

=== Grasshopper ===
On 6 February 2014, Jahić joined Swiss Super League side Grasshopper on a half-year deal.

=== Levadiakos ===
On 1 September 2015, Jahić joined Super League Greece side Levadiakos on a year deal for an undisclosed fee.

=== Second return to Željezničar and retirement ===
On 28 June 2016, Jahić returned to and signed a two-year contract with Željezničar. After making only five league appearances, his contract was officially terminated by the club on 24 July 2017. Jahić retired from football shortly after.

== International career ==
From 2001 until 2002, Jahić was a regular member of the Bosnia and Herzegovina U21 national team. In November 2007, he was called up to the senior team by Fuad Muzurović for the last game in the UEFA Euro 2008 qualifying match against Turkey. He did not play in the game but the call itself was a great honour and fulfillment of his childhood dreams. Jahić made his debut for Bosnia and Herzegovina in a March 2008 friendly match against Macedonia and then became a standard member of the national team and was even a scorer of the crucial second goal (leading his country to 1–2) in Bosnia's great victory away at Belgium (2–4) on 28 March 2009. He also played against Portugal in the qualification play-offs for the 2010 FIFA World Cup and got his chance once again against Portugal during qualification play-offs for UEFA Euro 2012, thanks to good form while playing in the 2011–12 UEFA Champions League for APOEL. He has earned a total of 23 caps, scoring 1 goal. His final international was a May 2012 friendly against Mexico.

== Coaching career ==
On 7 July 2020, it was announced that Jahić had become a new coach in the youth team of former club Željezničar.

== Career statistics ==
=== International ===
Appearances and goals by national team and year
National team	Year	Apps	Goals
Bosnia and Herzegovina	2008	1	0
Bosnia and Herzegovina	2009	11	1
Bosnia and Herzegovina	2010	6	0
Bosnia and Herzegovina	2011	2	0
Bosnia and Herzegovina	2012	3	0
Total		23	1

Sanel Jahić: International goals
No.	Date	Venue	Opponent	Score	Result	Competition
1	28 March 2009	Cristal Arena, Genk, Belgium	Belgium	1–2	2–4	2010 FIFA World Cup qualification

== Honours ==
=== Player ===
Sochaux

- Ligue 2: 2000–01

Željezničar

- Bosnian Cup: 2002–03
- Bosnian Supercup: 2001

AEK Athens

- Greek Cup: 2010–11

APOEL

- Cypriot Super Cup: 2011
