= Dave Mackay (footballer, born 1981) =

Scottish football player & coach (born 1981)

Personal information
- Full name: David Robert Mackay
- Date of birth: 2 May 1981 (age 45)
- Place of birth: Rutherglen, Scotland
- Position: Defender

Senior career*
Years	Team	Apps	(Gls)
1999–2004	Dundee	87	(2)
2001	→ Brechin City (loan)	16	(1)
2001	→ Arbroath (loan)	5	(0)
2004–2005	Oxford United	44	(0)
2005–2009	Livingston	132	(16)
2009–2016	St Johnstone	223	(13)
2021	Dundee	0	(0)
Total		507	(32)

Managerial career
- 2015–2016: St Johnstone (U20 assistant)
- 2016–2018: Stirling Albion
- 2020–2022: Dundee (assistant manager)
- 2022–2024: Dunfermline Athletic (assistant manager)
- * Club domestic league appearances and goals

David Robert Mackay (born 2 May 1981) is a Scottish former professional football player, who was recently the assistant manager of Dunfermline Athletic. He played as a defender for Dundee, Brechin City, Arbroath, Oxford United, Livingston and St Johnstone. Mackay captained St Johnstone when they won the 2014 Scottish Cup Final. Because of this, he's now regarded as a legend at St Johnstone.

After retiring as a player in 2016, Mackay was then manager of Stirling Albion for two years, before returning to Dundee as first-team coach and then assistant manager alongside manager James McPake and briefly Mark McGhee.

== Playing career ==
=== Dundee ===
Mackay started his senior career at Dundee, where he first gained on loan to Brechin City in the 2000–01 season. Mackay made his debut for the club, starting the whole game, in a 1–0 loss against Hamilton Academical on 3 February 2001. Having become a first team regular at Brechin City, he scored his first goal for the club, in a 3–1 win against Montrose on 16 April 2001. Mackay went on to make sixteen appearances and scoring once in all competitions at Brechin City. At the start of the 2001–02 season, Mackay was loaned out to Arbroath. He went on to make five appearances before returning to his parent club. Reflecting on his loan experiences, Mackay said the move benefited him, stating: "I just wanted to get away and play games".

After gaining loan experience, Mackay returned to Dundee to get a first team recall and made his debut for the Dens, coming on as the 8th-minute substitute for Alessandro Romano, in a 1–0 win against Kilmarnock on 23 September 2001. He then scored his first goal for the club, in a 1–1 draw against Hearts on 23 November 2001. Since returning, Mackay's first-team opportunities increased at Dundee, playing in the right–back position. At the end of the 2001–02 season, Mackay went on to make eighteen appearances and scoring once in all competitions.

In the 2002–03 season, Mackay's playing time increased, as he began rotating in playing either left–back position or right–back position, as well as injuries to other players. On 1 March 2003, Mackay scored his first goal of the season for Dundee, in a 3–1 win against Partick Thistle. He then helped the club reach the Scottish Cup final after beating Inverness CT 1–0 win. Mackay was in the squad for the Scottish Cup final, in a 1–0 loss to Rangers. At the end of the 2002–03 season, he went on to make forty–three appearances and scoring once in all competitions.

Reflecting on his 2003–04 season, Mackay knew that he would be expecting to increase his first team chances at Dundee following the Scottish Cup final. Mackay played four times in the UEFA Cup qualification rounds before the club was eliminated in the first round by Perugia. When Dundee were placed in administration, he was among those kept on, due to his low salary at the time. It was revealed that before administration, Mackay was offered a three-year contract with the club. Despite this, he helped Dundee finish seventh place in the league after the club beat Livingston on 12 May 2004. At the end of the 2003–04 season, Mackay went on to make forty–four appearances in all competitions.

At the end of the 2003–04 season, Mackay was offered a new contract at Dundee on reduced terms. Unfortunately, it announced that he would be likely to leave Dundee when his contract will come to an end. By the time that Mackay left the club, he played over 100 games for the Dark Blues over the course of five seasons at Dens Park.

=== Oxford United ===
In the summer of 2004, his five-year spell at Dens ended when Mackay was transferred south to Oxford United.

He made his debut for the club, starting the whole game, in a 1–0 loss against Boston United in the opening game of the season. Mackay then helped Oxford kept three consecutive clean sheets in the league between 21 August 2004 and 30 August 2004. Under the management of Graham Rix, he established himself in the first team at Oxford United, playing in the right–back position. MacKay played a role when he set up a goal for Tommy Mooney, in a 1–0 win over Cheltenham Town on 30 October 2004. By the end of his first season at the club, he had made 44 appearances for Oxford United. MacKay have desire to fight for the first team following the arrival of Lee Mansell.

=== Livingston ===
After desire to coming back to Scotland for family reasons, Mackay returned to Scotland to sign for Livingston.

He made his debut for the club, starting the whole game, in a 3–0 loss against Rangers in the opening game of the season. Since joining Livingston, Mackay became a first team regular for the club, playing in the right–back position. He then scored his first goal for Livingston, scoring an equaliser, in a 2–1 win against Inverness Caledonian Thistle in the quarter-finals of the Scottish League Cup. Mackay's second goal for the club came on 5 March 2006, in a 3–2 loss against Hearts. Despite being almost ever-present player in his first season, Livingston, however, was relegated to Scottish Division One after finishing twelfth place. At the end of the 2005–06 season, he went on to make forty–four appearances and scoring two times in all competitions.

The 2006–07 season saw Mackay scoring in the first four league matches of the season, coming against Queen of the South, Ross County, Partick Thistle and Dundee. He continued to remain in the first team for Livingston, playing in the right–back position. On 13 January 2007, Mackay scored his fifth goal of the season of the season, in a 3–2 win over St Johnstone. A month later on 5 February 2007, he scored the club's only goal of the game, in a 4–1 loss against Celtic in the fourth round of the Scottish Cup. Then on 10 March 2007, Mackay scored his seventh goal of the season, in a 3–1 loss against Airdrie United. However, MacKay was unable to help the club get promoted back to the Scottish Premier League. At the end of the 2006–07 season, he went on to make thirty–nine appearances and scoring seven times in all competitions.

The first two months to the 2007–08 season saw Mackay scoring five times, coming against Ayr United (twice), Dunfermline Athletic, Greenock Morton and Clyde. He continued to remain in the first team for Livingston, playing in the right–back position. Mackay then scored three times throughout November, including Stirling Albion and a brace against Alloa Athletic. On 5 January 2008, he scored his ninth goal of the season, in a 6–1 win over Greenock Morton. In the fifth round replay of Scottish Cup against Partick Thistle, which both teams drew throughout the match, MacKay missed the penalty in the shootout, which eliminated Livingston out of the Scottish Cup. After the match, he expressed disbelief for missing the penalty, having blasted over the bar. On 12 April 2008, Mackay scored his tenth goal of the season, in a 3–1 loss against Hamilton Academical. At the end of the 2007–08 season, with the club finishing seventh place in the league, he went on to make forty–one appearances and scoring ten times in all competitions.

Ahead of the 2008–09 season, Mackay's future with Livingston was in doubt after clubs from the Scottish Premier League made a bid to sign him, only to be rejected by the club. As a result, he admitted to considering a transfer request, but ended up staying at Livingston. Despite the club's unprecedented changes with new owners and managers throughout the 2008–09 season, McKay remained as a key player to the club. MacKay then score his first goal for the club, in a 6–1 loss against Queen of The South on 4 October 2008. His second goal of the season for Livingston came on 22 November 2008, in a 2–1 loss against Partick Thistle. He then scored his third goal of the season, in a 4–2 win over Ross County on 31 January 2009. With the club's recent surroundings, MacKay hope the problem over the wages will be resolved soon. However, he sustained a calf injury that kept him out for four weeks. Mackay then made his return from injury, starting the whole game, in a 1–0 win against Clyde on 3 April 2009. However, his return was short–lived when he suffered a calf injury again during a 2–0 loss against Greenock Morton and was out for the rest of the 2008–09 season. At the end of the 2008–09 season, Mackay went on to make thirty–one appearances and scoring three times in all competitions.

Shortly after the 2008–09 season was concluded, Mackay was linked a move away from Livingston, as he was subjected to a bid, alongside Murray Davidson, from Scottish clubs like Dundee and Motherwell. However, Mackay was reluctant to leave Livingston and intended to stay there unless he received his money he was due in unpaid wages. Despite no intention to leave the club over unpaid wages, MacKay says he was glad to leave Livingston.

=== St Johnstone ===
In May 2009, Mackay transferred from Livingston to St Johnstone, who had won promotion to the Scottish Premier League. Davidson later revealed that they almost joined Dundee before the Saints won the race to sign the pair. Manager Steve Lomas, stated in the 2012 interview, praised his predecessor for his role of signing both players.

He made his debut for the club, coming on as a 71st-minute substitute, in a 5–0 win over Stenhousemuir the first round of the Scottish League Cup. Fifteen days later on 15 August 2009, Mackay made his league debut for St Johnstone, starting the whole game, in a 2–2 draw against Motherwell. Since joining the club, he became a first team regular in the right-back position, beating off competitions from Gary Irvine. Mackay would then score his first goal for the club, in a 1–1 draw against St Mirren. He also appeared in every matches until he missed two matches due to an injury. Mackay returned on 24 April 2010 from his injury, starting the whole game, in a 1–1 draw against Aberdeen. In his first season at St Johnstone, he went on to make forty–three appearances and scoring once in all competitions. Following this, Mackay signed a two-year contract extension with the club. He revealed that manager Derek McInnes played a role for convincing him to sign a contract. In addition, Mackay was named as PA Sport/Easy Heat Systems player of the year.

Ahead of the 2010–11 season, MacKay was appointed as a vice-captain for St Johnstone. However, in the opening game of the season against Hearts, he started the match despite not fit, due to a back injury and played 54 minutes before being substituted. As a result of being substituted, MacKay was sidelined for three weeks, which he played with a broken back. On 10 September 2010, Mackay returned to the starting line–up and played 76 minutes, in a 2–0 loss against Motherwell. However, he suffered a torn thigh muscle that kept him out for the rest of November. Mackay returned on 10 December 2010 from his injury, starting the whole game, and setting up the first goal, in a 2–1 win over St Mirren. Four weeks later on 2 January 2011, he set up the goal of the game, in a 1–0 win against Inverness CT. Following his return from injury, Mackay described his injuries as "the most frustrating spell in his 12-year career". His return also saw him regain his first team place in the right–back position. Following the club's elimination in the semifinals of the Scottish Cup, he helped the Saints kept three consecutive clean sheets in the last three league matches of the season At the end of the 2010–11 season, Mackay went on to make thirty–nine appearances in all competitions.

At the start of the 2011–12 season, Mackay continued to be a first team regular, playing in the right–back position. Following St Johnstone's losing twice in the first three league matches of the season, he scored his first goal of the season, in a 1–0 win over Celtic, giving them their first win at Celtic Park since 1998. Mackay then scored his second goal of the season, in a 2–0 win over Inverness Caledonian Thistle on 15 October 2011. After the departure of manager McInnes and manager Lomas replacing him, MacKay's first team place remain unaffected throughout the 2011–12 season. He then scored on 26 November 2011 and 3 December 2011 against Hibernian and Hearts (also his 100th appearance for the Saints), winning both matches for the club respectively. However, in the fifth round of Scottish Cup against Hearts, he was sent-off for the first time in his professional career, for a second bookable offence, in a 1–1 draw. After the match, MacKay expressed his surprised to have a red card or the first time in his professional career, though he was proud of his record up until his sending off. His suspension in the replay match saw St Johnstone eliminated from the tournament. Since the start of the 2011–12 season, Mackay played in every matches until he missed two matches in late–April, due to fitness issues. Following his return from injury, the club qualified for a place in Europe despite finishing sixth place. Reflecting on qualifying for Europe, Mackay reacted with mixed emotions, due to his sympathy for his former teammate James McPake, who played for Hibernian in the Scottish Cup, and his fears of not playing in Europe if FIFA barred Scottish clubs, citing ongoing situation at Rangers. At the end of the 2011–12 season, he made forty appearances and scoring four times in all competitions.

At the start of the 2012–13 season, Mackay was promoted as St Johnstone's captain following the departure of Jody Morris, with his vice-captain role goes to Davidson. However, he missed the club's first match of the season, due to a calf injury, as the club lost 2–0 against Turkish side Eskişehirspor in the UEFA Europa League second qualifying round. But Mackay would make his return in the return leg, coming on as a 60th-minute substitute, in a 1–1 draw, eliminating St Johnstone from the tournament. Since the start of the 2012–13 season, he continued to be a first team regular, playing in the right–back position, as well as, being captain. Mackay scored his first goal of the season, in a 1–1 draw against Ross County on 16 November 2012. After the match, Mackay says he dedicated his goal to his son, who child died earlier this April. However, Mackay received a straight red card at the last minutes for an altercation with Leigh Griffiths. After the match, he was served with a two match suspension. Mackay returned on 18 December 2012 from his suspension, starting the whole game, in a 3–0 win against Cowdenbeath. On 28 January 2013, he signed a two-year deal with the club, keeping him until 2015, Shortly after signing the contract, Mackay scored his second goal of the season two days later, in a 3–1 win over Aberdeen. However, he sustained a calf injury that left him out for three weeks. On 27 February 2013, Mackay returned to the starting line–up and scored a free kick, in a 2–2 draw against Dundee. A week later on 9 March 2013, he made 150th appearances for the Saints, in a 2–0 win against Kilmarnock. Prior to the match in the last game of the game, he said his aim was to help St Johnstone win 2–0 to third place in the league and qualify for Europe again. In the last game of the season, Mackay made his promise by playing a huge role of assisting the second goal of the game, in a 2–0 win over Motherwell to seal a third-place finish in the league and qualify for Europe again. At the end of the 2012–13 season, he went on to make thirty–six appearances and scoring three times in all competitions. For his performance, Mackay was named St Johnstone's Supporters Bus Player of the Year.

At the start of the 2013–14 season, Mackay led St Johnstone to a victory against Rosenborg in the UEFA Europa League second qualifying round first leg. In the return leg, he led the club to a 1–1 draw to help the Saints advance to the next round. After the match, Mackay told BBC Scotland about how proud he was of helping St Johnstone going through in the UEFA Europa League. However, in the UEFA Europa League third qualifying round against Minsk, Mackay played in both legs that eventually lead to penalty shootout and he was one of the three players to fail convert the shootout, as the club were eliminated from the tournament. After the match, Mackay was among Minsk's critics after they criticised the Saints' antics. Since the start of the 2013–14 season, he continued to be a first team regular, playing in the right–back position, as well as, being captain. Mackay helped St Johnstone kept three consecutive clean sheets in the first three league matches of the season and was on a scoresheet, in a 4–0 win over Ross County on 17 August 2013. He then scored his second goal of the season on 5 October 2013, in a 4–0 win over Inverness Caledonian Thistle. Mackay helped the Saints kept three consecutive clean sheets in all competitions between 27 October 2013 and 2 November 2013. Since the start of the 2013–14 season, Mackay started in every matches until he missed one match in late–December, due to calf injury sustained during a 1–0 loss against Celtic on 26 December 2013. Mackay quickly recovered from the injury and returned to the starting line–up, in a 4–0 loss against Motherwell. He led St Johnstone to the final of the Scottish Cup final after helping the Saints beat Aberdeen 2–1 on 13 April 2014. Mackay then scored his third goal of the season, on 3 May 2014, in a 2–1 loss against Motherwell. After missing one match due to rest, he returned to the starting line–up as captain and led the club beat Dundee United 2–0 to win the Scottish Cup final for the first time ever. After the match, Mackay said winning the Scottish Cup and the medal for the final was worth the wait for him, as he had been desperate to lift the trophy. As he lifted the trophy, Mackay recorded himself with GoPro from a unique angle. At the end of the 2013–14 season, he went on to make forty–eight appearances and scoring three times in all competitions.

At the start of the 2014–15 season, Mackay played in first leg of the UEFA Europa League second qualifying round against Luzern. In the return leg at McDiarmid Park, he played 120 minutes, leading to penalty shootout after a 2–2 draw on aggregate, and made amends for his missed penalty by emphatically scoring the third penalty, which St Johnstone won 5–4 in the shootout to advance to the next round. In the UEFA Europa League second qualifying round second leg against Spartak Trnava, Mackay scored a late consolation, in a 2–1 loss. After the match, he was critical of the club's performance in the first leg as "hopeless", but expressed optimism of their chances of winning in the return leg. However, in the return leg, MacKay was unable to help St Johnstone overturn the deficit, resulting in their elimination from the UEFA Europa League. In a match against Celtic on 13 August 2014, he received a red card for a second bookable offence for a foul on Derk Boerrigter despite making no contact from Boerrigter, who dived to win the penalty. After the match, the club appealed Mackay's sending off. Shortly after, his appeal was overturned by the Scottish Football Association and Boerrigter, in turn, was charged and missed two matches, prompting him to comment on the red card, stating that he had been innocent the whole time. Mackay's suspension was later overturned by the Scottish Football Association. Since the start of the 2014–15 season, he continued to be a first team regular, playing in the right–back position, as well as, being captain. Mackay helped St Johnstone kept three consecutive clean sheets in the league between 6 December 2014 and 20 December 2014. He then scored his first goal of the season, in a 2–0 win over Partick Thistle on 17 January 2015. Mackay missed two matches due to a knock. He made his return from injury, starting the whole game, in a 2–1 loss against Celtic on 14 February 2015. Three days after his return, Mackay signed a one-year contract extension with the club. He followed up by helping the Saints kept three consecutive clean sheets in the league between 21 February 2015 and 4 March 2015. Mackay then made his 250th appearance for St Johnstone on 25 April 2015, in a 2–0 win over Dundee. However, he had have a hip operation that saw him out for the remainder of the 2014–15 season. Despite his absence, the club qualified for the UEFA Europa League for the third year running, having reiterated on setting out his target. At the end of the 2014–15 season, Mackay made forty–two appearances and scoring two times in all competitions.

In the 2015–16 season, Mackay continued to rehabilitate his hip following an operation and missed the first two matches to the season, as well as, missing out two Europa League matches before returning to the bench against Ross County on 11 August 2015. He made his return in the first team as captain in the next match against Dundee on 15 August 2015. Following this, Mackay regained his first team place, playing in the right–back position, as well as, being captain. This last until he was sent–off for a second bookable offence, in a 1–0 win over Inverness CT on 24 October 2015. After serving a one match suspension, Mackay made his return to the starting line–up as captain and led St Johnstone beat Kilmarnock 2–1 on 7 November 2015. His form led him signing a one-year contract extension with St Johnstone on 23 November 2015. He then scored his first goal of the season, in a 3–2 win over Ross County on 5 December 2015. However, Mackay's season ended early again in February 2016, after he required another operation on the hip injury he had suffered the previous season. A month later, Mackay's hip operation turned out to be successful. At the end of the 2015–16 season, he went on to make twenty appearances and scoring once in all competitions.

Ahead of the 2016–17 season, Mackay made his return to training after months on the sidelines with a hip injury. However, he, once again, needed surgery on his hip after undergoing an injection. Due to ongoing problems with his hip, Mackay was forced to retire from playing professional football in September 2016. Upon retirement, he was met with praise, with his teammate Steven Anderson describe him as the best player who has never been capped in Scotland, while his former Manager McInnes referred Mackay as his perfect signing in his managerial career.

A year later, Mackay was rewarded for his years of service to St Johnstone with a testimonial match against Dundee on 6 October 2017. He played in his testimonial match against his former club, as the Saints lose 5–3, where it attracted more than 1,500 supporters. Two years later, Mackay was inducted to St Johnstone's Hall of Fame.

== Coaching career ==
=== Stirling Albion ===
After a spell coaching St. Johnstone U20s, Mackay was appointed manager of Scottish League Two side Stirling Albion in November 2016. He made his first signing for the club when Calvin Colquhoun and Dylan Bikey joined the Binos on 25 November 2016.

His first match in charge as a Stirling Albion's manager came on 12 November 2016, in a 3–2 win against Elgin City. After the club started out with a worst defensive record, the January transfer window saw Mackay made several signings, including signing his former teammates, Frazer Wright and Liam Caddis. He led Stirling Albion go on an eight match unbeaten streak between 11 February 2017 and 25 March 2017, which helped the club ease relegation fears. As a result, Mackay was named Scottish League Two's manager of the month for March for the first time. He led the club to a sixth-place finish at the end of the 2016–17 season.

The start of the 2017–18 season saw Mackay won Scottish League Two's manager of the month for August, having helped Stirling Albion received 12 points in the first four league matches. His five league match unbeaten streak between 31 January 2018 and 24 February 2018 led to him receiving Scottish League Two's manager of the month for February again. He led Stirling Albion earn a place in the Scottish League One play–offs. However, the club went on lose 4–0 on aggregate against Peterhead. Despite this, Mackay signed a contract with Stirling Albion.

The start of the 2018–19 season saw the club win three matches and made a poor start to the season. Because of this, he was sacked by Stirling Albion on 29 September 2018, after a 3–0 defeat against Albion Rovers. After being sacked by the club, Mackay revealed that he just completed UEFA Pro License and hasn't ruled out returning to management.

=== Dundee ===
On 19 June 2019, Mackay was appointed first team coach and head of opposition analyses for Dundee under manager James McPake, having hold a UEFA Coaching Badge. Following the departure of Wright, his name was short–listed to become the next manager of his former club, St Johnstone. However, he ruled out becoming a manager of the Saints but wouldn't rule it out in the future.

On 26 August 2020, he was announced as the club's new assistant manager. At the end of the 2020–21 season, Dundee achieved promotion to the Scottish Premiership via the play-offs. Following this, both he and McPake signed a contract extension with the Dens.

On Boxing Day in 2021, following an injury crisis and a number of Dundee players needing to isolate due to a positive COVID-19 case, Mackay was forced out of retirement and was registered as a player for an away game against Aberdeen, though he remained an unused substitute. Despite McPake being released by Dundee on 17 February 2022, Mackay would stay on as assistant manager under new manager Mark McGhee. Following the departure of McGhee, he was linked with a managerial job to become a manager of Dundee before it went to Gary Bowyer. On 22 June 2022, Dundee confirmed that Mackay had left the club by mutual consent.

=== Dunfermline Athletic ===
On the same day that Dundee confirmed his release, Mackay rejoined James McPake and was named assistant manager of Scottish League One side Dunfermline Athletic. He explained joining McPake at the Pars, feeling that it was a right time to leave the Dens again.

An immensely successful first season with Dunfermline Athletic culminated with both Mackay and McPake leading the side to the Scottish League One title and promotion to the Scottish Championship. However, both he and McPake left Dunfermline Athletic after they were sacked following a 2–0 loss against Greenock Morton that left the club at the second bottom of the Scottish Championship.

== Personal life ==
MacKay married his wife, Laura, having been together since they both were eighteen, and have two children. However, tragedy struck when their soon-to-be third child was stillborn.

Outside of football, Mackay is a financial advisor.

== Career statistics ==
=== Player ===
As of 12 September 2016

Appearances and goals by club, season and competition
Club	Season	League		Cup		League Cup		Other^{[A]}		Total	
Club	Season	App	Goals	App	Goals	App	Goals	App	Goals	App	Goals
Dundee	2001–02	17	1	1	0	0	0	0	0	18	1
Dundee	2002–03	35	1	6	0	2	0	0	0	43	1
Dundee	2003–04	35	0	2	0	3	0	4	0	44	0
Dundee	Total	87	2	9	0	5	0	4	0	105	2
Brechin City (loan)	2000–01	16	1	0	0	0	0	0	0	16	1
Arbroath (loan)	2001–02	5	0	0	0	1	0	1	0	7	0
Oxford United	2004–05	44	0	1	0	1	0	1	0	47	0
Livingston	2005–06	38	1	2	0	4	1	0	0	44	2
Livingston	2006–07	34	6	2	1	2	0	1	0	39	7
Livingston	2007–08	34	6	4	2	2	2	1	0	41	10
Livingston	2008–09	26	3	1	0	2	0	2	0	31	3
Livingston	Total	132	16	9	3	10	3	4	0	155	22
St Johnstone	2009–10	36	1	2	0	5	0	0	0	43	1
St Johnstone	2010–11	32	0	5	0	2	0	0	0	39	0
St Johnstone	2011–12	36	4	2	0	2	0	0	0	40	4
St Johnstone	2012–13	32	3	2	0	1	0	1	0	36	3
St Johnstone	2013–14	36	3	5	0	3	0	4	0	48	3
St Johnstone	2014–15	34	1	2	0	2	0	4	1	42	2
St Johnstone	2015–16	17	1	1	0	2	0	0	0	20	1
St Johnstone	2016–17	0	0	0	0	0	0	0	0	0	0
St Johnstone	Total	223	13	19	0	17	0	9	1	268	14
Career total		507	32	38	3	34	3	19	1	598	39

A. Other includes UEFA Cup, Europa League, Football League Trophy & Scottish Challenge Cup

=== Managerial record ===
As of match played 22 September 2018

Managerial record by team and tenure
Team	Nat	From	To	Record								Ref
Team	Nat	From	To	G	W	D	L	GF	GA	GD	Win %	Ref
Stirling Albion	(Scotland)	9 November 2016	29 September 2018	84	32	16	36	122	133	−11	38.10	

== Honours ==
=== Player ===
Dundee

- Scottish Cup: runners-up, 2002–03

St Johnstone

- Scottish Cup: 2013–14

=== Manager ===
==== Individual ====
- Stirling Albion
  - SPFL League Two Manager of the Month (3): March 2017, August 2017 and February 2018
