= Nigel Hasselbaink =

Surinamese footballer (born 1990)

Personal information
- Full name: Nigel Hasselbaink
- Date of birth: 21 November 1990 (age 35)
- Place of birth: Amsterdam, Netherlands
- Height: 1.70 m (5 ft 7 in)
- Position: Forward

Youth career
- 2001–2005: AFC
- 2005–2007: Ajax
- 2007–2010: Jong PSV

Senior career*
Years	Team	Apps	(Gls)
2009–2010	PSV	0	(0)
2010	→ Go Ahead Eagles (loan)	13	(2)
2010–2011	Hamilton Academical	27	(3)
2011–2012	St Mirren	34	(6)
2012–2014	St Johnstone	66	(12)
2014–2015	Veria	1	(0)
2015	Hamilton Academical	10	(1)
2015–2017	Excelsior	49	(11)
2017–2018	Ironi Kiryat Shmona	33	(7)
2018–2020	Hapoel Be'er Sheva	53	(13)
2020–2021	Bnei Sakhnin	27	(0)
2023–2024	AFC	12	(0)
Total		325	(55)

International career^{‡}
2006	Netherlands U16	5	(1)
2019–2021	Suriname	9	(8)
- * Club domestic league appearances and goals as of 16:25, 3 January 2024 (UTC) ‡ National team caps and goals as of 21 July 2021

Nigel Hasselbaink (born 21 November 1990) is a retired footballer who played as a forward. Born in the Netherlands, he represented the Suriname national team.

== Personal life ==
Hasselbaink was born and raised in the Netherlands. He is the nephew of former Leeds United, Chelsea and Middlesbrough striker Jimmy Floyd Hasselbaink.

== Club career ==
Born in Amsterdam, Hasselbaink began his career at PSV and by 2007, Hasselbaink signed his first professional contract with PSV. He failed to make a senior appearance for the side, and instead made his professional début during the second half of the 2009–10 season while on loan at Go Ahead Eagles in the Eerste Divisie. After his loan spell at Go Ahead Eagles, Hasselbaink was released by the club.

On 23 August 2010, Hasselbaink signed for Hamilton Academical on a free transfer following his release by PSV, after impressing manager Billy Reid while on trial. He made his début for Hamilton in the Scottish Premier League four days later, in a 1–0 victory against Inverness Caledonian Thistle.

On 6 June 2011, Hasselbaink moved to St Mirren, signing a one-year contract along with Paul McGowan. Hasselbaink made his debut for the club in a 0–0 draw against Dunfermline Athletic on 25 July 2011 where he played 90 minutes. Hasselbaink scored his first league goal for the club on 30 July 2011, against Aberdeen which was the only goal of the game. On 6 August 2011, Hasselbaink provided an assist for Steven Thompson but received a straight red card for unsportsmanlike conduct towards Paul Dixon in a 1–1 draw against Dundee United. After receiving a red card, the club appealed for his sending off to be rescinded but lost the appeal. Hasselbaink became the first player to go through the new streamlined disciplinary procedures.

At the end of the season, Manager Danny Lennon said the club offered both Hasselbaink and Jeroen Tesselaar a new contract due to their good performances throughout the season and felt 'confident' and 'optimistic' of keeping both of them at the club. Whilst negotiations were taking place, club captain Jim Goodwin pleaded the duo to sign a new contract and show their loyalty.

In May 2012, Hasselbaink turned down an improved contract from St Mirren and left the club with clubs from England and Scotland chasing to sign him.

By 28 June 2012, Hasselbaink signed with St Johnstone. After his move to St Johnstone, Hasselbaink said he made the right decision in joining St Johnstone and revealed that manager Steve Lomas convinced him that he had made the best decision for his promising career. Hasselbaink also revealed that he had offers from several English clubs. Hasselbaink was praised by manager Steve Lomas, and he formed a striking partnership with Grégory Tadé. In his first season at St Johnstone, Hasselbaink scored seven goals in forty-two appearances in all competitions, including scoring in a 2–0 win over Motherwell to earn St Johnstone a place in the Europa League for the following season.

However, in 2013–14 season, Hasselbaink's partnership with Tade came to an end after Tade left for Romania. Hasselbaink scored his first goal of the new season in a 4–0 win over Ross County on 11 August 2013. Hasselbaink went on to score four more goals and made thirty-nine appearances in all competitions. Hasselbaink was released by the club at the end of the 2013–14 season. His release came after Hasslebaink was an un-used substitute for the Scottish Cup Final, which St Johnstone won 2–0 against Dundee United to win the club's historic first Scottish Cup in their first final appearance.

On 31 July 2014 he signed for Greek club Veria. However, after making only one appearance, Hasselbaink was released by the club on 2 February 2015.

In February 2015 he re-signed for Hamilton Academical until the end of the season. Hasselbaink made his Hamilton Academical debut on the 22 February 2015, being named in the starting eleven in a 4–0 loss against Celtic. Hasselbaink then scored his first goal since returning to Hamilton in a 3–2 win over Kilmarnock on 2 May 2015. He was released by Hamilton at the end of the 2014–15 season. He returned to the Netherlands in Excelsior in later 2015.

On 2 November 2020, Hasselbaink joined another Israeli Premier League side, signing for Bnei Sakhnin. Following his departure from the club in 2021, he took a two-year break from football. However, in 2023, he made a comeback in the Netherlands, joining Tweede Divisie outfit AFC. He retired in 2024.

== International career ==
Hasselbank played 5 games (1 goal) for the Netherlands national under-16 football team in 2006, but later chose to play for Suriname.

Hasselbaink debuted for the Suriname national football team in an unofficial friendly 3–2 loss to Curaçao wherein he scored his debut goal. In November 2019 Hasselbaink was called up to represent Suriname in Gold Cup qualification matches. He scored his first official international goal in a 2–1 CONCACAF Nations League win over Nicaragua. On 27 March 2021 he scored a hat-trick against Aruba. In June 2021 Hasselbaink was named to the Suriname squad for the 2021 CONCACAF Gold Cup, where he scored the winning goal in Suriname's 2–1 triumph over Guadeloupe in their final group match.

== Career statistics ==
=== Club ===
As of match played 25 May 2024

Appearances and goals by club, season and competition
Club	Season	League			National cup (Note: Includes KNVB Cup, Scottish Cup, Greek Cup, Israel State Cup)		League cup (Note: Includes Scottish League Cup, Toto Cup)		Continental		Other		Total	
Club	Season	Division	Apps	Goals	Apps	Goals	Apps	Goals	Apps	Goals	Apps	Goals	Apps	Goals
PSV	2009–10	Eredivisie	0	0	0	0	—		0	0	—		0	0
Go Ahead Eagles (loan)	2009–10	Eerste Divisie	13	2	2	0	—		—		1 (Note: Appearance(s) in Eerste Divisie Promotion play-offs)	0	16	2
Hamilton Academical	2010–11	Scottish Premier League	27	3	1	1	0	0	—		—		28	4
St Mirren	2011–12	Scottish Premier League	34	6	5	1	3	1	—		—		42	8
St Johnstone	2012–13	Scottish Premier League	36	7	2	0	2	0	2 (Note: Appearance(s) in UEFA Europa League)	0	—		42	7
St Johnstone	2013–14	Scottish Premier League	30	5	2	1	3	0	4	0	—		39	6
St Johnstone	Total		66	12	4	1	5	0	6	0	—		81	13
Veria	2014–15	Super League Greece	1	0	2	1	—		—		—		3	1
Hamilton Academical	2014–15	Scottish Premiership	10	1	0	0	0	0	—		—		10	1
Excelsior	2015–16	Eredivisie	17	1	2	0	—		—		—		19	1
Excelsior	2016–17	Eredivisie	32	10	2	1	—		—		—		34	11
Excelsior	Total		49	11	4	1	—		—		—		53	12
Ironi Kiryat Shmona	2017–18	Israeli Premier League	31	6	5	2	6	1	—		—		42	9
Ironi Kiryat Shmona	2018–19	Israeli Premier League	2	1	0	0	5	3	—		—		7	4
Ironi Kiryat Shmona	Total		33	7	5	2	11	4	—		—		49	13
Hapoel Be'er Sheva	2018–19	Israeli Premier League	32	6	2	0	0	0	0	0	0	0	34	6
Hapoel Be'er Sheva	2019–20	Israeli Premier League	21	7	2	0	1	0	7	1	—		31	7
Hapoel Be'er Sheva	Total		53	13	4	0	1	0	7	1	0	0	65	13
Bnei Sakhnin	2020–21	Israeli Premier League	27	0	3	2	0	0	—		—		30	2
AFC	2023–24	Tweede Divisie	12	0	0	0	—		—		—		12	0
Career total			325	55	30	9	20	5	13	1	1	0	389	70

=== International ===
As of match played 20 July 2021

National team	Year	Apps	Goals
Suriname	2019	2	1
Suriname	2021	7	7
Total		9	8

Scores and results list Suriname's goal tally first, score column indicates score after each Hasselbaink goal.

List of international goals scored by Nigel Hasselbaink
No.	Date	Venue	Opponent	Score	Result	Competition	Ref.
1	18 November 2019	Nicaragua National Football Stadium, Managua, Nicaragua	Nicaragua	2–0	2–1	2019–20 CONCACAF Nations League B	
2	27 March 2021	IMG Academy, Bradenton, United States	Aruba	1–0	6–0	2022 FIFA World Cup qualification	
3	27 March 2021	IMG Academy, Bradenton, United States	Aruba	3–0	6–0	2022 FIFA World Cup qualification	
4	27 March 2021	IMG Academy, Bradenton, United States	Aruba	4–0	6–0	2022 FIFA World Cup qualification	
5	4 June 2021	Dr. Ir. Franklin Essed Stadion, Paramaribo, Suriname	Bermuda	2–0	6–0	2022 FIFA World Cup qualification	
6	4 June 2021	Dr. Ir. Franklin Essed Stadion, Paramaribo, Suriname	Bermuda	4–0	6–0	2022 FIFA World Cup qualification	
7	4 June 2021	Dr. Ir. Franklin Essed Stadion, Paramaribo, Suriname	Bermuda	5–0	6–0	2022 FIFA World Cup qualification	
8	20 July 2021	Shell Energy Stadium, Houston, United States	Guadeloupe	2–1	2–1	2021 CONCACAF Gold Cup	

== Honours ==
St Johnstone

- Scottish Cup: 2013–14
