= Graham Gartland =

Irish footballer and coach

Personal information
- Full name: Graham Robert Gartland
- Date of birth: 13 July 1983 (age 43)
- Place of birth: Dublin, Ireland
- Position: Centre back

Youth career
- Stella Maris
- Home Farm
- Barnsley

Senior career*
Years	Team	Apps	(Gls)
2001–2003	Dundee United	0	(0)
2003	St Patrick's Athletic	0	(0)
2003–2004	Longford Town	30	(3)
2005–2008	Drogheda United	102	(4)
2008–2012	St Johnstone	35	(2)
2010–2011	→ Ross County (loan)	3	(0)
2012	Shamrock Rovers	15	(0)
2013	Shelbourne	24	(1)

International career
1999–2000	Republic of Ireland U17	6	(0)
2007	Republic of Ireland B	1	(0)
- * Club domestic league appearances and goals

Graham Gartland (born 13 July 1983) is an Irish football coach and former player. He played for Drogheda United, Shamrock Rovers, Home Farm, Barnsley, Dundee United, St Patrick's Athletic, Longford Town and St Johnstone. Gartland also played for the Republic of Ireland B national football team.

== Club career ==
Gartland scored a goal for Drogheda in a UEFA Cup tie against HJK Helsinki in August 2006. In the next round against IK Start Gartland became the first player in UEFA Cup history to miss two penalties in a shoot out as Drogheda were eliminated.

He then had a good UEFA Champions League run with Drogheda in 2008. He scored the winner against FC Levadia Tallinn in the second leg of the first round tie. He also scored a late equaliser against Dynamo Kyiv in the second round tie. His form attracted the interest of Ipswich Town, but Drogheda rejected a bid of £250,000.

Gartland signed for St Johnstone under freedom of contract in December 2008. Almost immediately after joining, Gartland suffered an injury to his cruciate ligament which would go on to keep him out the game for six weeks. Graham continued to help his old club Drogheda United with fundraising after the club entered examinership.

Almost exactly a month after signing, Gartland made his competitive debut for the Perth club in an away fixture against Greenock Morton. As part of a new look three-man defence, Gartland helped Saints keep a clean sheet as they drew 0–0. He made seven league appearances for Saints as they won promotion to the Scottish Premier League by winning the First Division. Gartland was released from his contract with St Johnstone by mutual consent in January 2012. He had not played for the club in the 2011–12 season, after recovering from a long-term injury.

On 13 January 2012, Gartland signed for his home town club. On 24 January 2013, Gartland signed for Shelbourne FC.

== International career ==
Graham represented Republic of Ireland at every age level up to and including under-21. He played for the Republic of Ireland U16 in the qualifiers for the 2000 UEFA European Under-16 Championship, and has also played at B international level.

== Coaching career ==
Gartland assisted Neil McCann at Scottish Premiership club Dundee until they were both sacked by the club in October 2018.

== Honours ==
Longford Town

- FAI Cup (2): 2003, 2004
- League of Ireland Cup (1): 2004

Drogheda United

- League of Ireland (1): 2007
- FAI Cup (1): 2005
- Setanta Sports Cup (2): 2006, 2007

St Johnstone

- Scottish First Division (1): 2008–09
