= Liam Craig =

Scottish footballer (born 1986)

Personal information
- Date of birth: 27 December 1986 (age 39)
- Place of birth: Chirnside, Scotland
- Position: Midfielder

Youth career
- 2000–2002: Berwick Rangers Juniors
- 2002–2006: Ipswich Town

Senior career*
Years	Team	Apps	(Gls)
2006–2008	Falkirk	49	(2)
2007–2008	→ St Johnstone (loan)	19	(2)
2008–2013	St Johnstone	172	(32)
2013–2015	Hibernian	58	(8)
2015–2022	St Johnstone	172	(19)
Total		470	(63)
- * Club domestic league appearances and goals as of 15:59, 6 August 2021 (UTC)

Liam Craig (born 27 December 1986) is a Scottish former professional footballer. He is an attack-minded creative midfield player who operates on the left side of midfield or in a central position. He has played for Falkirk, St Johnstone and Hibernian during a sixteen-year career. Upon retiring at the end of the 2020–21 season, he became a coach with St Johnstone, Queen's Park and Hibernian.

== Club career ==
=== Youth career ===
Born in Chirnside, Scotland, Craig began his football career at Berwick Rangers Juniors, which was seven miles from his hometown. He moved to Ipswich Town at sixteen years old, a week after leaving school and progressed through the academy.

In the 2003–04 season pre–season friendly tour, Craig was the top–scorer in the Doetinchem tournament and helped the Ipswich Town's academy win a silverware. The 2004–05 season saw Craig skippered the youth side all the way to the 2005 FA Youth Cup final. After beating Tottenham Hotspur's academy in the semifinals, he said about reaching the final: "This is absolutely brilliant. We knew Tottenham would play very well here and we showed great character to come from a goal down to win it." Craig captained the Ipswich Town's academy in the FA Youth Cup final in both legs against Southampton's academy and helped the youth side win 3–2 on aggregate.

However, he found it difficult to break into the first team at Ipswich Town. On 9 January 2006, Craig was among three players to be released by the club.

=== Falkirk ===
On 17 January 2006, Craig joined Scottish Premier League side Falkirk, where he started out his professional football career. Upon joining the Bairns, Craig said: "I'm delighted to be here. I was told a couple of weeks ago I did not have a future at Ipswich and although that was hard to take I was soon in contact with Falkirk and the move was done in a couple of days. It was a bit of a shock to be let go after captaining the FA Youth Cup-winning side but when I did not get offered a deal at the end of last season I began to have doubts. Ipswich was a great place to gain experience and to learn the game, but Falkirk have a lot of ambition and I've come here with a point to prove and I intend to do that."

He made his debut for the Bairns, coming on as a 62nd-minute substitute, in a 4–1 loss against Inverness Caledonian Thistle on 21 January 2006. Craig became a first team regular for Falkirk for the rest of the 2005–06 season. For his performance, Craig signed a one–year contract with the Bairns. At the end of the 2005–06 season, he made nineteen appearances in all competitions.

In the opening game of the 2006–07 season, Craig scored the winning goal (also his first goal for Falkirk), in a 2–1 win against Dundee United. He then scored his second goal of the season, in a 5–0 win against Cowdenbeath in the second round of the Scottish League Cup. On 20 September 2006, Craig signed a contract with Falkirk, keeping him until 2008. During a match against Hibernian on 23 September 2006 as an unused substitute, he received a red card in the 16th minute for having an altercation with Hibs supporters. After the match, Craig's action was criticised by manager John Hughes, stating he should have known better. Despite this, the Bairns was unsuccessful to appeal Craig's red card and served a one match suspension. His second season at Falkirk saw him remain involved in the first team. On 16 December 2006, he gained his revenge on Hibernian by scoring in a 2–1 win against Hibernian. At the end of the 2006–07 season, Craig went on to make twenty–five appearances and scoring three times in all competitions.

In the 2007–08 season, Craig's first team place at Falkirk was under threat, as he found himself placed on the substitute bench. Despite this, Craig scored his only goal of the season for the Bairns, in a 1–1 draw against Aberdeen on 29 October 2007. After leaving Falkirk, he made seven appearances and scoring once in all competitions. Following his loan spell at St Johnstone ended, the Bairns offered him a new contract.

=== St Johnstone ===
Craig moved to St Johnstone on a month's loan in December 2007. His performance at the Saints saw him extend his stay until the end of the season and then signed on a permanent basis in July 2008. A transfer tribunal ruled that Saints would pay Falkirk £25,000 for his services, with a further £12,000 if the club was promoted to the SPL during his time at McDiarmid Park and also 25% of any future transfer received by Saints from another club.

==== Playing in the First Division ====
He made his debut for St Johnstone, starting the whole game, in a 1–0 loss against Hamilton Academical on 15 December 2007. In a follow–up match, Craig scored on his home debut against Livingston, as the Saints won 5–2. Since joining the club, he quickly became a first team regular, playing in the midfield position. Craig scored two goals in two matches between 12 February 2008 and 16 February 2008 against Ross County and Hamilton Academical. On 8 March 2008, he returned to the first team from the sidelines against St Mirren in the quarter–finals of the Scottish Cup and scored from a penalty, in a 1–1 draw to earn a replay. In the replay match, Craig helped St Johnstone win 3–1 to reach the semi–finals of the Scottish Cup. In the semi–finals of the Scottish Cup against Rangers, he played the whole game all the way to the penalty shootout, in a 1–1 draw and successfully converted his kick in the shootout, as the Saints lost 4–3 in a shootout. At the end of the 2007–08 season, Craig went on to make twenty–four appearances and scoring four times in all competitions.

In the opening game of the 2008–09 season, Craig, however, received a straight red card for a foul on Leigh Griffiths, as St Johnstone went on to win 2–0 win against Livingston. After serving a one match suspension, he returned to the starting line–up, in a 1–0 loss against Dunfermline Athletic on 27 August 2008. Craig scored his first goal of the season, in a 3–1 loss against Livingston. Since joining the Saints on a permanent basis, he became a first team regular, mostly playing in the left midfield position. At one point, Craig played in the left–back position as the season progressed. He then scored four more goals for the club by the end of the year, coming against Partick Thistle, Dunfermline Athletic, Clyde and Airdrieonians. It was not until on 11 April 2009 when Craig scored his sixth goal of the season, in a 3–1 win against Dunfermline Athletic. He was part of St Johnstone's promotion squad when the Saints secured promotion to the Scottish Premier League after beating Greenock Morton to end their seven-year stint in the First Division. At the end of the 2008–09 season, Craig went on to make thirty–seven appearances and scoring six times in all competitions.

==== Playing in the Scottish Premiership ====
In the opening game of the 2009–10 season, Craig played in his first match in top–flight Scottish football for over a year against Motherwell and set up a goal for Murray Davidson, in a 2–2 draw. After missing three matches due to injuries, he made his return to the first team, starting a match, in a 3–0 loss against Hibernian on 19 September 2009. Following this, Craig continued to his first team place, playing in the left midfield position. He then scored his first goal of the season, in a 2–1 loss against Aberdeen on 7 November 2009. Craig scored four goals in three matches between 17 January 2010 and 27 January 2010, including a brace against Forfar Athletic in the fourth round of the Scottish Cup. He scored three goals in two matches against Hibernian between 17 February 2010 and 27 February 2010. Two weeks later against his former club, Falkirk, on 13 March 2010, Craig scored a penalty before setting up a winning goal for Kenny Deuchar. On 30 March 2010, he scored St Johnstone's third goal of the game, in a 4–1 win against Rangers. In a follow–up match against Dundee United, Craig missed a penalty that saw the Saints lose 1–0. After the match, manager Derek McInnes said that he doesn't blame the players for missing the penalty. After missing one match due to being one booking away from suspension, he scored on his return, in a 3–2 loss against Hamilton Academical. At the end of the 2009–10 season, Craig made thirty–six appearances and scoring two times in all competitions.

Ahead of the 2010–11 season, Craig were among several St Johnstone players to undergo a summer-long fitness regime to keep them in top condition. In a match against Aberdeen on 21 August 2010, he suffered an injury and was substituted in the 35th minute, as the Saints loss 1–0. After missing three matches, Craig made his return to the starting line–up, in a 2–1 win against St Mirren on 18 September 2010. Two weeks later on 2 October 2010, he scored his first goal of the season, in a 2–0 win against Hibernian. Following this, Craig remained in the first team, playing either the left–midfield and defensive midfield position. However, in a match against Hearts on 13 November 2010, Craig suffered a calf injury and was substituted at half–time, in a 2–0 loss. On 27 November 2010, he made his return from injury, coming on as a 60th-minute substitute, in a 0–0 draw against Hibernian. In a follow–up match against St Mirren, Craig scored the winning goal in the last minute of the game, as the club won 2–1. He then scored the only goal of the game, in a 1–0 win against Motherwell on 26 January 2011. Two weeks later, on 9 February 2011, Craig scored his fourth goal of the season, in a 2–0 win against Partick Thistle. A month later on 29 March 2011, he signed a contract extension with St Johnstone, keeping him until 2013. After serving a one match suspension for accumulating five yellow cards in early–April, Craig made his return to the starting line–up, in a 1–0 loss against Celtic on 9 April 2011. Two weeks later, on 30 April 2011, he scored his fifth goal of the season, in a 2–1 win against Hibernian. In a match against Hamilton Academical on 10 May 2011, Craig scored the only goal of the game to ensure the Saints' victory. At the end of the 2010–11 season, he went on to make forty–six appearances and scoring six times in all competitions.

In the opening game of the 2011–12 season against Aberdeen, Craig started the match and played 45 minutes before being substituted at half–time, as St Johnstone drew 0–0. After missing one match, he returned to the starting line–up against Dunfermline Athletic, only for him to miss the penalty, as the Saints lost 1–0. After the match, manager McInnes removed Craig from taking penalties and gave it to Francisco Sandaza. In a follow–up match against Celtic, he set up a goal for Dave Mackay to score the only goal of the game, which saw the club earn their first win at Celtic Park since 1998. In the next match against Dundee United on 27 August 2011, Craig scored from a long distance free kick, in a 3–3 draw. The following month saw him score two more goals for St Johnstone against Motherwell and Hibernian (also making his 150th appearance for the Saints). December saw him add two more goals for the Saints, coming against Hearts and Dunfermline Athletic. In a match against Hibernian on 21 January 2012, he scored and then set up the winning goal for Sandaza, in a 3–2 win. After missing one match through suspension for accumulating five yellow cards, Craig scored from a penalty spot, in a 5–1 loss against Motherwell on 28 April 2012. Following his return from suspension, the club qualified for a place in Europe despite finishing sixth place. Having continued to remain in the first team throughout the 2011–12 season, he went on to make forty–one appearances and scoring seven times in all competitions.

==== Playing in European football ====
Craig played in both legs of the UEFA Europa League second qualifying round against Turkish side Eskişehirspor, as St Johnstone went on to lose 4–1 on aggregate and was eliminated in the tournament. He then scored three goals in three matches between 22 September 2012 and 29 September 2012, coming against Ross County, Queen's Park and Dundee. It was not until on 24 November 2012 when Craig made his 200th appearance for the Saints, in a 2–1 win against Kilmarnock.

With his contract expiring at the end of the 2012–13 season, his future at the club was in doubt when Hibernian was interested in signing him. In response, St Johnstone manager Steve Lomas revealed that Craig was offered a new contract as a result. Amid to his future at the Saints, he scored the only goal of the game, in a 1–0 against Dundee on 2 January 2013. On 20 January 2013, during his first match following the announcement, Craig scored his fifth goal of the season, in a 3–2 loss against Motherwell. Hibernian unsuccessfully reached an agreement with St Johnstone to fast-track Craig's transfer four months early.

On 1 April 2013, he scored a late header in the last minute of the game, in a 1–1 draw against Dundee United. After the match, Craig said his aim was to help the Saints qualify for the Europe again before leaving the club on a high note. After serving a one match suspension for accumulating five yellow cards, he returned to the starting line–up, in a 1–0 win against Inverness Caledonian Thistle on 27 April 2013. In a follow–up match against Dundee United, Craig scored the only goal of the game from a free kick. In his last game for St. Johnstone, Craig scored a goal which would help the Saints seal third position in the Scottish Premier League and qualification for the 2013–14 UEFA Europa League. At the end of the 2012–13 season, he made forty–three appearances and scoring eight times in all competitions, making him a joint top scorer with Murray Davidson and Steven MacLean. By the time Craig left the club, he made over 200 appearances for St. Johnstone in his first spell.

=== Hibernian ===
Craig signed a pre-contract agreement with Hibernian on 18 January 2013.

He made his debut for the club in the first leg of the UEFA Europa League second qualifying round against Malmö FF. However, Craig was unable to help Hibernian overturn the deficit in the return leg, as the club lose 7–0 and was eliminated from the tournament. He made his league debut for Hibernian, starting the whole game, in a 1–0 loss against Motherwell in the opening game of the season. Since joining the club, Craig became a first team regular, playing in a wide-midfield position. He scored his first goal for Hibernian on 24 August 2013, scoring twice in a 2–1 victory against Kilmarnock. After the match, manager Pat Fenlon believed that Craig will play the best out of him in a wide-midfield position. Two days after being named man of the match against St Mirren by writer Irvine Welsh, he scored his first ever career hat-trick, in a 2013–14 Scottish League Cup tie against Stranraer. Craig then scored his sixth goal for the club, in a 1–0 win against Partick Thistle on 7 October 2013. During a 1–0 loss in the Edinburgh derby against city rivals, Hearts, in the quarter–finals of the Scottish League Cup, he was involved trying to kick Ryan Stevenson in the face. This prompted the Scottish Football Association to give him a two match suspension, prompting Hibernian to appeal against his suspension, which was unsuccessful. After serving a one match suspension and Fenlon's sacking, Craig was appointed as a new Hibernian captain in November 2013 by new manager Terry Butcher, succeeding James McPake. On 2 January 2014, he scored the winner in the Edinburgh derby against city rivals Hearts from the penalty spot. Craig scored a brace in a follow–up, in a 2–2 draw against Dundee United. However, he found himself competing with as Michael Nelson over the captaincy role, as the club's performance faltered towards the end of the season. In the Premiership play–off final against Hamilton Academical, Craig captained in both legs that led to penalty shootout following a 2–2 draw on aggregate and scored in a shootout, as Hibernian loss 4–3 and were relegated to the Scottish Championship. After the match, he described the match the low point of his career and agreed that the club's supporters have every right o want to rid of every last one of the player. At the end of the 2013–14 season, he went on to make forty–two appearances and scoring nine times in all competitions.

Ahead of the 2014–15 season, Craig was told by the Hibernian management that he can leave the club after being linked with a move to Aberdeen and St Johnstone. In the end, Craig stayed at Hibernian and was determined to help the club get promoted back to the Scottish Premiership. He continued to remain as captain for Hibernian in his second season at the club but also found himself in and out of the starting eleven. In the opening game of the 2014–15 season against Livingston, Craig set up the opening goal of the game for Farid El Alagui, in a 2–1 win. In the Edinburgh derby against city rivals, Hearts, he missed the penalty, which Hibernian would have taken the lead, as the club went on to lose 2–1. Craig then scored his first goal of the season, in a 2–1 win against Alloa Athletic on 29 November 2014. In a match against Rangers on 27 December 2014, he set up the first two goals of the game before scoring a goal for himself, in a 4–0 win. In a match against former club, Falkirk, on 10 January 2015, Craig scored an own goal that saw Hibernian give away a 3–0 lead to draw. It was not until on 25 April 2015 when he scored his third goal of the season, in a 4–1 win against Alloa Athletic. Craig played in both legs of the semi–finals of Premiership play-offs against Rangers, as he was unable to help the club to secure promotion from the Scottish Championship after losing 2–1 on aggregate. At the end of the 2014–15 season, Craig went on to make thirty–two appearances and scoring three times in all competitions.

Following this, Craig was not offered a new contract by Hibs at the end of the 2014–15 season.

=== St Johnstone (second spell) ===
On 16 July 2015, Craig returned to St Johnstone for the second time by signing a one-year contract. Upon re–joining the Saints, manager Tommy Wright said he was happy to see the return of Craig that he never wanted him to leave the club in the first place. Manager Wright also stated that Craig is expected to score more goals on his return to St Johnstone.

==== First season return at St Johnstone ====
Craig's first game after signing for St Johnstone on a permanent basis for the second time came in the opening game of the season, in a 4–3 loss against Hearts. Since re–joining the Saints, he regained his first team place, playing in the midfield positions. Manager Tommy Wright explained that Craig found himself place in the substitute bench, due to lack of preparation he received in the pre–season.

On 12 September 2015, Craig scored his first goal since his return to the club, in a 4–1 win against Hamilton Academical. Three weeks later on 3 October 2015, he scored his second goal of the season, in a 5–1 win against Aberdeen. Craig then scored the winning goal at the last minute of the game, coming from a penalty spot, in a 1–0 win against Inverness Caledonian Thistle on 24 October 2015. However, in a match against Kilmarnock on 7 November 2015, he received a straight red card in the 86th minute for a foul on Steven Smith, as St Johnstone won 2–1. After serving a two match suspension, Craig returned to the starting line–up, in a 3–2 win against Ross County on 5 December 2015. However, he suffered a hamstring injury while training and missed one match as a result.

On 16 January 2016, Craig made his return to the first team, coming on as a 77th-minute substitute, in a 0–0 draw against Hamilton Academical. On 20 February 2016, he made his 250th Saints appearance and set up the equalising goal, in the 2–1 win against Motherwell at McDiarmid Park. Seven days later, on 27 February 2016, Craig scored an equaliser from a penalty spot, in a 1–1 draw against Aberdeen. After serving a one match suspension for accumulating five yellow cards, he returned to the starting line–up, in a 3–0 loss against Kilmarnock on 9 April 2016. In a follow–up match against Aberdeen, Craig scored his fifth goal of the season, in a 3–0 win. In the last game of the season against Hearts, he scored the opening goal of the game from a penalty spot, in a 2–2 draw. The following day, Craig signed a one–year contract extension with the club.

==== 2016–17 season ====
The start of the 2016–17 season saw Craig helped St Johnstone progress through the group stage of the Scottish League Cup. He also scored his first goal of the season, in a 4–0 win against Stirling Albion in the Scottish League Cup. Craig continued to feature in the first team, playing in the midfield position.

In a match against Hearts on 17 September 2016, he set up a goal for Graham Cummins, who scored the winning goal, in a 1–0. In a follow–up match against Hamilton Academical, Craig scored the equalising goal to earn a 1–1 draw. On 3 December 2016, he scored his 50th goal in a Saints shirt in the 3–0 win over Inverness Caledonian Thistle at McDiarmid Park. However, he suffered a back injury that saw him out for one match. On 23 December 2016, Craig made his return to the starting line–up, coming on as a 70th-minute substitute, in a 1–0 win against Kilmarnock. Following a 2–1 loss against Celtic on 5 February 2017, he confronted Mikael Lustig and was physically restrained by teammates, leading to be booked and suspended for one match.

After serving a one match suspension, Craig made his return to the starting line–up against Rangers on 1 March 2017 and set up two goals, in a 3–2 loss. Two weeks later, on 18 March 2017, he scored a brace, in a 2–1 win against Motherwell. On 27 March 2017, he signed a new two-year contract with the club, keeping him at McDiarmid Park until the summer of 2019. On 27 March 2017, Craig signed a two–year contract extension with the club. On 8 April 2017, Craig scored on his 300th appearance for St Johnstone, scoring the second goal from the penalty spot, in a 3–0 win against Inverness Caledonian Thistle. His contributions saw the Saints qualify for the UEFA Europa League next season. At the end of the 2016–17 season, he made forty–six appearances and scoring six times in all competitions. For his performance, Craig was awarded the Muirton Sweeties' Cult Hero and the George Gordon Clubman of the Year at the club's award ceremony.

==== 2017–18 season ====
Prior to the match of the UEFA Europa League first qualifying round against FK Riteriai, Craig said he cannot wait to play in European football once again. In the first leg against FK Riteriai, Craig started the match and set up a goal for Joe Shaughnessy to score St Johnstone's only goal of the game, as the Saints loss 2–1. He made another start in the second leg, as the club went on to lose 3–1 on aggregate and was eliminated from the tournament. However, at the start of the 2017–18 season, he found himself placed on the substitute bench, due to strong competitions in the midfield positions.

Despite this, Craig set up two goals in two matches between 26 August 2017 and 9 September 2017 to help St Johnstone earn a draw in both matches. In a follow–up match against Dundee, he scored a brace, in a 3–2 loss. After serving a one match suspension for accumulating five yellow cards, he scored on his return from a penalty spot, in a 3–1 loss against Partick Thistle on 27 January 2018. However, Craig's return was short–lived when he suffered a hamstring injury that saw him out for two matches. But Craig made his return from injury, coming on as a late substitute, in a 0–0 draw against Celtic on 18 February 2018. In a match against Partick Thistle on 28 April 2018, he set up a goal for Joe Shaughnessy, in a 1–1 draw to help St Johnstone secure their Scottish Premiership status for next season. At the end of the 2017–18 season, Craig went on to make twenty–seven appearances and scoring three times in all competitions.

==== 2018–19 season ====
At the start of the 2018–19 season, Craig captained St Johnstone three times in the Scottish League Cup that saw the Saints qualify for the knockout stage. In the second round of the Scottish League Cup against Queen of the South, he set up the club's third goal of the game, in a 4–2 win. Craig managed to regain his first team place back, playing in the midfield positions.

During a 2–0 win against St Mirren on 27 October 2018, both Craig and teammate Tony Watt hade their penalty missed, causing him to be stripped of his penalty duties. On 29 December 2018, Craig made his 362nd appearance for the Saints and scored in a 2–0 away win over Dundee; This put him second place behind teammate Steven Anderson in the club's all-time appearances list. In the same week, he was also appointed as chairman of the PFA Scotland (players' union) management committee. On 25TH January 2019, Craig signed a contract extension with the Saints, keeping him until 2020. After being dropped for one match, he scored on his return, in a 2–1 loss against Hamilton Academical on 6 February 2019. Following this, Craig called for the removal of artificial pitches of Scottish football, due to its inconsistency on the pitch. In a match against Motherwell on 30 March 2019, he missed the penalty for the second time this season, as the club loss 3–0. Craig later captained St Johnstone on two occasions and helped the Saints, once again, secure their Scottish Premiership status for next season. At the end of the 2018–19 season, he made forty–three appearances and scoring two times in all competitions.

==== 2019–20 season ====
Ahead of the 2019–20 season, Craig said he's willing to help and develop youngsters to establish themselves in the first team. Craig was appointed as St Johntone's vice–captain behind Jason Kerr. He made two appearances in the Scottish League Cup, as the Saints were eliminated in the group stage. However, Craig suffered a groin injury that saw him out for a month. On 26 October 2019, he made his return from injury, coming on as a late substitute, in a 3–2 win against Hamilton Academical.

Following his return from injury, Craig found himself, alternating between the starting eleven and the substitute bench. In a match against Aberdeen on 5 February 2020, he set up a goal for Ali McCann to help the club win 1–0 and was named Man of the Match by local newspaper The Courier. However, in a match against St Mirren, on 5 March 2020, Craig received a red card for a second bookable offence, in a 0–0 draw, in what turned out to be his last game of the season.

The season was curtailed because of the COVID-19 pandemic. By the time the season curtailed ended, he made eighteen appearances in all competitions. Craig was one of three St Johnstone players to sign a short-term six-month contract extension in May 2020, as the club formulated plans amid the ongoing coronavirus pandemic. While in lockdown, he helped out players and supporters with advice and being a lookout for them. As a chairman of PFA Scotland, Craig spoke out that there was no chance of seeing football behind closed doors happening, stating that the safety of PFA members was his number one priority. He also criticised Scottish Professional Football League's decision makers for drowning players' voices out of the league reconstruction debate.

==== 2020–21 season ====
Ahead of the 2020–21 season, Craig said he could not wait to play under the new management of Callum Davidson. In the opening game of the 2020–21 season, Craig scored his first goal of the season, in a 1–1 draw against Dundee United. In a follow–up match against Rangers, he made his 400th appearance for St Johnstone, starting a match and played 63 minutes before being substituted, as the Saints loss 3–0. However, in a match against Hibernian, on 23 August 2020, he received a red card for a second bookable offence, in a 1–0 loss. After serving a one match suspension, Craig returned to the first team, coming on as a 64th-minute substitute, in a 1–0 loss against Motherwell on 12 September 2020.

Craig played all four matches in the group stage of the Scottish League Cup and helped the club reach the knockout stage of the Scottish League Cup. He started in the next two Scottish League Cup matches, including scoring a winning penalty in a shootout against Dunfermline Athletic. However, Craig, once again, found himself, alternating between the starting eleven and the substitute bench. alternating between the starting eleven and the substitute bench. On 21 December 2020, he signed a contract extension until the end of the season with the Saints. Nine days later, on 30 December 2020, Craig captained his 350th appearance for the club in top–flight football, as St Johnstone drew 0–0 against Hamilton Academical. After the club reached the Scottish League Cup final, Craig said he's determined to play in the final for St Johnstone, having missed out prior to this. Craig started in the Scottish League Cup final against Livingston and helped the Saints win 1–0. After the match, he said it was an emotional moment for him to win a trophy in the final.

A week later, on 6 March 2021, Craig scored the only goal of the game, in a 1–0 win against Hibernian. On 21 March 2021, he signed a contract extension with the club, keeping him until the end of the 2021–22 season. A month later, on 21 April 2021, he scored from a penalty spot at the last minute of the game, in a 1–1 draw against Rangers. Four days later, on 25 April 2021, against Rangers in the quarter–finals, Craig helped the Saints play all the way to penalty shootout, in a 1–1 draw and successfully converted his penalty, as the club won 4–2 to advance to the semi–finals. However, towards the end of the 2020–21 season, he missed two matches, due to testing positive for COVID-19 amid the COVID-19 pandemic in Scotland. But Craig made his return to the starting line–up against Livingston in the last game of the season and helped St Johnstone draw 0–0 to qualify for the Europe next season. However, he appeared as an unused substitute, in a 1–0 win against Hibernian, resulting in the Saints winning a double this season. At the end of the 2020–21 season, Craig made thirty–three appearances and scoring three times in all competitions.

==== 2021–22 season ====
Prior to the third qualifying round of the UEFA Europa League against Galatasaray, Craig said he cannot wait to play against another Turkish club. He played in the second leg of the third qualifying round of the UEFA Europa League against Galatasaray, as St Johnstone loss 5–3 on aggregate and was demoted to the UEFA Europa Conference League. Following the Saints' elimination in the UEFA Europa League, Craig started in the last 16 of the Scottish League Cup against Arbroath, where he set up equalising goal at extra time, leading to penalty shootout and successfully converted the penalty, as the club won 3–2 in a shootout to advance to the next round. Craig also played in the second leg of the UEFA Europa Conference League play–off round against LASK, in a 3–1 loss on aggregate and was eliminated from the tournament as well.

In the first two months to the season, Craig began playing in the defensive midfield position and took over the captaincy following the departure of Jason Kerr. He surpassed his former teammate, Steven Anderson's all-time St Johnstone record appearance, in a 3–1 win against Dundee on 2 October 2021. However, Craig soon lost his first team place, due to strong competitions in the midfield positions. By December, he made five starts, playing in the defensive midfield position before returning to the substitute bench. After not playing for two months, Craig made two appearances in the remaining two matches of the league against Aberdeen and Hibernian. He appeared as an unused substitute in both legs of the league's play–off final against Inverness Caledonian Thistle, as the Saints went on to win 6–2 on aggregate to retain their league status next season. At the end of the 2021–22 season, Craig went on to make twenty–two appearances in all competitions.

== International career ==
Craig was eligible to play for Scotland (his birthplace), England (through his English mother) and Wales (through his Welsh grandmother). In May 2005, he was called up to the Scotland U19 squad for the first time. Craig made three appearances for the under-19 side, as he was unable to help Scotland U19 qualify for the UEFA European Under-19 Championship.

== Coaching career ==
In July 2016, Craig revealed that he's planning to be a coach once his playing career comes to an end and has a coaching badge. During his playing career, Craig became a part-time coach and scouting for St Johnstone. He announced his retirement at the conclusion of the 2021–22 season, became a full time coach with St Johnstone. Craig and Alec Cleland were joint managers of the Saints' B team throughout the 2022–23 season. On 29 October 2023, both he and Steven MacLean parted company with the club.

Craig joined the Arbroath coaching team in November 2023, assisting caretaker manager Stuart Malcolm. He then joined Queen's Park in January 2024 as assistant to former St Johnstone manager Callum Davidson.

Craig would leave Queen's in June 2024 to become assistant head coach to David Gray at Hibernian.

== Personal life ==
Craig began to follow vegan diet at a recommendation from teammate Craig Bryson.

He is married to his wife, Laura, a Falkirk F.C. employee, and together they have three children.

== Career statistics ==
As of 6 August 2021

Appearances and goals by club, season and competition
Club	Season	League			Scottish Cup		League Cup		Other		Total	
Club	Season	Division	Apps	Goals	Apps	Goals	Apps	Goals	Apps	Goals	Apps	Goals
Falkirk	2005–06	Scottish Premier League	16	0	3	0	0	0	—		19	0
Falkirk	2006–07	Scottish Premier League	27	2	1	1	4	1	—		32	4
Falkirk	2007–08	Scottish Premier League	6	0	0	0	1	0	—		7	0
Falkirk	Total		49	2	4	1	5	1	0	0	58	4
St Johnstone (loan)	2007–08	Scottish First Division	19	2	5	2	0	0	0	0	24	4
St Johnstone	2008–09	Scottish First Division	34	5	1	0	2	1	0	0	37	6
St Johnstone	2009–10	Scottish Premier League	31	8	1	2	4	0	—		36	10
St Johnstone	2010–11	Scottish Premier League	34	5	5	1	2	0	—		41	6
St Johnstone	2011–12	Scottish Premier League	36	7	3	0	2	0	—		41	7
St Johnstone	2012–13	Scottish Premier League	37	7	2	0	2	1	2 (Note: Appearances in the Europa League)	0	43	8
St Johnstone	Total		191	34	17	5	12	2	2	0	222	41
Hibernian	2013–14	Scottish Premiership	34	6	2	0	2	3	4 (Note: Two appearances in the Europa League and two in the Premiership play-offs)	0	42	9
Hibernian	2014–15	Scottish Championship	24	2	3	1	2	0	3 (Note: One appearance in the Scottish Challenge Cup and two in the Premiership play-offs)	0	32	3
Hibernian	Total		58	8	5	1	4	3	7	0	74	12
St Johnstone	2015–16	Scottish Premiership	35	6	0	0	3	0	0	0	38	6
St Johnstone	2016–17	Scottish Premiership	36	5	2	0	6	1	—		44	6
St Johnstone	2017–18	Scottish Premiership	27	3	1	0	1	0	2	0	31	3
St Johnstone	2018–19	Scottish Premiership	36	2	2	0	5	0	—		43	2
St Johnstone	2019–20	Scottish Premiership	15	0	1	0	2	0	—		18	0
St Johnstone	2020–21	Scottish Premiership	22	3	3	0	7	0	—		32	3
St Johnstone	2021–22	Scottish Premiership	1	0	0	0	0	0	0	0	1	0
St Johnstone	Total		172	19	9	0	24	1	2	0	207	20
Career total			470	63	35	7	45	7	11	0	561	77

== Honours ==
Ipswich Town Youth

- FA Youth Cup: 2004–05

St Johnstone

- Scottish First Division: 2008–09
- Scottish League Cup: 2020–21
- Scottish Cup: 2020–21
