= 2009–10 St Johnstone F.C. season =

St Johnstone F.C.
2009–10 season
- Chairman: Geoff Brown
- Manager: Derek McInnes
- Scottish Premier League: 8th
- Scottish Cup: Fifth round
- League Cup: Semi-final
- Top goalscorer: League: Liam Craig (8); All: Liam Craig
Home colours

St Johnstone were back in the Scottish Premier League for the first time since 2002 after winning the 2008–09 Scottish First Division. On 15 August 2009, they opened their league season with a 2–1 draw against Motherwell at McDiarmid Park, with Murray Davidson getting the opening league goal after 34 minutes.

In the Scottish Cup, St Johnstone reached the fifth round where they lost by 1–0 to Dundee United.

In the League Cup they went all the way to the semi-final where they lost by 2–0 to Rangers at Hampden Park.

== Squad ==
Note: Flags indicate national team as defined under FIFA eligibility rules; some limited exceptions apply. Players may hold more than one non-FIFA nationality.

No.	Pos.	Nation	Player
2	DF	SCO	Dave Mackay (Vice-Captain)
3	DF	ENG	Danny Grainger
4	MF	ENG	Jody Morris (Captain)
5	DF	SCO	Kevin Rutkiewicz
6	DF	ENG	Michael Duberry
7	MF	SCO	Chris Millar
8	MF	SCO	Martin Hardie
10	MF	SCO	Liam Craig

No.	Pos.	Nation	Player
12	DF	SCO	Steven Anderson
14	MF	SCO	Kevin Moon
15	GK	SCO	Graeme Smith
16	FW	SCO	Peter MacDonald
17	DF	IRL	Graham Gartland
20	MF	SCO	Murray Davidson
21	FW	TRI	Collin Samuel
22	FW	SCO	Steven Milne
23	FW	IRL	Andy Jackson

== League table ==
Pos	Team	Pld	W	D	L	GF	GA	GD	Pts
6	Heart of Midlothian	38	13	9	16	35	46	−11	48
7	Hamilton Academical	38	13	10	15	39	46	−7	49
8	St Johnstone	38	12	11	15	57	61	−4	47
9	Aberdeen	38	10	11	17	36	52	−16	41
10	St Mirren	38	7	13	18	36	49	−13	34

Source: SPFL Archive
Rules for classification: 1) points; 2) goal difference; 3) number of goals scored.
