= 2012–13 St Johnstone F.C. season =

St Johnstone
2012–13 season
- Chairman: Steve Brown
- Manager: Steve Lomas
- Stadium: McDiarmid Park
- Premier League: Third place
- Scottish Cup: Fifth round
- League Cup: Quarter-finals
- UEFA Europa League: Second qualifying round
- Top goalscorer: League: Liam Craig; Murray Davidson; Nigel Hasselbaink; Rowan Vine (7 each); All: Liam Craig; Murray Davidson; Steve MacLean (8 each)
- Highest home attendance: 6,700 vs. Celtic, 15 September 2012
- Lowest home attendance: 2,167 vs. Aberdeen, 30 December 2013
- Average home league attendance: League: 3,712

The 2012–13 season was St Johnstone's fourth consecutive season in the Scottish Premier League, having been promoted from the Scottish First Division at the end of the 2008–09 season. St Johnstone also competed in the Europa League, League Cup and the Scottish Cup.

== Summary ==
=== Season ===
St Johnstone finished third in the Scottish Premier League. They reached the Second qualifying round of the Europa League, the Quarter-final of the League Cup and the fifth round of the Scottish Cup.

== Results and fixtures ==
Win Draw Loss Postponed

=== Preseason ===
8 July 2012 Friendly (Closed Door)	St Johnstone	4–0	(Romania) Concordia Chiajna	Grangemouth Stadium
	Higgins 28'; Wright 70'; Hasselbaink 72'; Craig 74'	St Johnstone Report; Concordia Report		Attendance: 0

11 July 2012 Friendly	East Fife	0–4	St Johnstone	Bayview Stadium
19:30		St Johnstone Report	Higgins 6'; Hasselbaink 61'; Trialist 68'; Trialist 77'	Attendance: 566

14 July 2012 Friendly (Closed Door)	Partick Thistle	1–2	St Johnstone	Firhill Stadium
	Elliott 22'	Partick Report	Craig 6'; McCracken 86'	Attendance: 0

21 July 2012 Friendly	Cowdenbeath	1–1	St Johnstone	Central Park
15:00	McKenzie 42'	Report	Hasselbaink 86'

28 July 2012 Friendly	St Johnstone	2–1	Bristol City	McDiarmid Park
15:00	Vine 3', 37'	Report; St Johnstone Report	Stead 45'	Attendance: 1,564; Referee: Tumilty

=== Scottish Premier League ===
4 August 2012 Scottish Premier League	Heart of Midlothian	2–0	St Johnstone	Tynecastle Stadium
15:00	Sutton 30' (Penalty); Templeton 82'	BBC Report	Tadé (red card) 37'	Attendance: 13,022; Referee: O'Reilly

11 August 2012 Scottish Premier League	Motherwell	1–1	St Johnstone	Fir Park
15:00	Hammell (red card) 57'; McHugh 78'	BBC Report	Davidson 58'; Vine (yellow card) 80' (red card)	Attendance: 4,490; Referee: Brines

18 August 2012 Scottish Premier League	St Johnstone	1–2	Aberdeen	McDiarmid Park
15:00	Hasselbaink 83'	BBC Report	Osbourne 16'; Hayes 47'	Attendance: 4,857; Referee: Beaton

25 August 2012 Scottish Premier League	Hibernian	2–0	St Johnstone	Easter Road
15:00	Hanlon 45'; Doyle 53'	BBC Report		Attendance: 9,639; Referee: Clancy

1 September 2012 Scottish Premier League	St Johnstone	0–0	Dundee United	McDiarmid Park
15:00		BBC Report		Attendance: 5,014; Referee: Collum

15 September 2012 Scottish Premier League	St Johnstone	2–1	Celtic	McDiarmid Park
12:30	Tadé 18'; Vine 80'	BBC Report	Commons 4'	Attendance: 6,700; Referee: Norris

22 September 2012 Scottish Premier League	Ross County	1–2	St Johnstone	Victoria Park
15:00	Morrow 68'	BBC Report	Craig 30'; Vine (red card) 30'; Wright 86'	Attendance: 4,094; Referee: Allan

29 September 2012 Scottish Premier League	Dundee	1–3	St Johnstone	Dens Park
15:00	Conroy 22' (Penalty)	BBC Report	Tade 16'; Craig 27'; MacLean 52'	Attendance: 6,158; Referee: Muir

6 October 2012 Scottish Premier League	St Johnstone	2–1	St Mirren	McDiarmid Park
15:00	Hasselbaink 22'; Davidson 37'	BBC Report	Guy 49'	Attendance: 3,223; Referee: Muir

20 October 2012 Scottish Premier League	St Johnstone	2–1	Kilmarnock	McDiarmid Park
15:00	Davidson 30'; Hasselbaink 90'	BBC Report	Fowler 93'	Attendance: 3,113; Referee: Colvin

27 October 2012 Scottish Premier League	Inverness Caledonian Thistle	1–1	St Johnstone	Caledonian Stadium
15:00	McKay 73'	BBC Report	Robertson 90+2'	Attendance: 3,154; Referee: Beaton

3 November 2012 Scottish Premier League	St Johnstone	1–3	Motherwell	McDiarmid Park
15:00	Robertson 88'	BBC Report	Murphy 1', 38'; Law 73'	Attendance: 3,112; Referee: Colvin

11 November 2012 Scottish Premier League	Celtic	1–1	St Johnstone	Celtic Park
15:00	Watt 51'	BBC Report	Hasselbaink 77'	Referee: Brines

17 November 2012 Scottish Premier League	St Johnstone	1–1	Ross County	McDiarmid Park
15:00	Mackay 51'	BBC Report	Craig 70' (Own goal)	Attendance: 3,037; Referee: Collum

25 November 2012 Scottish Premier League	Kilmarnock	1–2	St Johnstone	Rugby Park
15:00	Pascali (red card) 5'; Nelson 85'	BBC Report	Davidson 31'; Vine 89'	Attendance: 4,208; Referee: O'Reilly

28 November 2012 Scottish Premier League	St Johnstone	0–1	Hibernian	McDiarmid Park
19:45		BBC Report	Cairney 82'	Attendance: 3,266; Referee: Thomson

8 December 2012 Scottish Premier League	St Mirren	1–1	St Johnstone	St Mirren Park
15:00	Dummett 69'	BBC Report	Davidson 15'; Anderson (red card) 38'; Millar (yellow card) 68' (yellow-red card)	Attendance: 3,702; Referee: Madden

15 December 2012 Scottish Premier League	St Johnstone	2–2	Heart of Midlothian	McDiarmid Park
15:00	Vine 16'; MacLean 60'	BBC Report	Sutton 15'; Driver 38'	Attendance: 2,974; Referee: Collum

22 December 2012 Scottish Premier League	Aberdeen	2–0	St Johnstone	Pittodrie Stadium
15:00	McGinn 63', 81'	BBC Report		Attendance: 7,051; Referee: Finnie

26 December 2012 Scottish Premier League	Dundee United	1–1	St Johnstone	Tannadice Park
12:00	Gunning 2'	BBC Report	McLean 47' (Own goal)	Attendance: 7,063; Referee: Murray

29 December 2012 Scottish Premier League	St Johnstone	0–0	Inverness Caledonian Thistle	McDiarmid Park
15:00		BBC Report		Attendance: 2,975; Referee: Madden

2 January 2013 Scottish Premier League	St Johnstone	1–0	Dundee	McDiarmid Park
14:00	Craig 33'	BBC Report		Attendance: 5,055; Referee: McKendrick

20 January 2013 Scottish Premier League	Motherwell	3–2	St Johnstone	Fir Park
14:15	Higdon 8', 20', 69'	BBC Report	Hasselbaink 77'; Craig 79'	Attendance: 3,649; Referee: Collum

30 January 2013 Scottish Premier League	St Johnstone	3–1	Aberdeen	McDiarmid Park
19:30	Tadé 33'; Vine 68'; Mackay 70'	BBC Sport	McGinn 44'	Attendance: 2,167; Referee: McLean

11 February 2013 Scottish Premier League	Hibernian	1–3	St Johnstone	Easter Road
19:30	Griffiths 82'	BBC Report	Vine 23', 26'; Cregg 58'	Attendance: 8,735; Referee: Clancy

16 February 2013 Scottish Premier League	Ross County	1–0	St Johnstone	Victoria Park
15:00	Sproule 11'	BBC Report		Attendance: 3,516; Referee: Beaton

19 February 2013 Scottish Premier League	St Johnstone	1–1	Celtic	McDiarmid Park
19:45	Hasselbaink 82'	BBC Report	Ambrose 36'	Attendance: 5,352; Referee: Norris

23 February 2013 Scottish Premier League	St Johnstone	1–0	St Mirren	McDiarmid Park
15:00	Vine 52'	BBC Report		Attendance: 2,816; Referee: Mclean

27 February 2013 Scottish Premier League	Dundee	2–2	St Johnstone	Dens Park
19:45	Baird 42'; Gallagher (red card) 66'; Stewart 89'	BBC Report	MacLean 36'; MacKay 68'	Attendance: 5,224; Referee: Collum

5 March 2013 Scottish Premier League	Heart of Midlothian	2–0	St Johnstone	Tynecastle Stadium
19:45	Stevenson 33'; Sutton 83'	BBC Report		Attendance: 10,080; Referee: Beaton

9 March 2013 Scottish Premier League	St Johnstone	2–0	Kilmarnock	McDiarmid Park
15:00	Davidson 58'; Tade 85'	BBC Report		Attendance: 2,425; Referee: Colvin

1 April 2013 Scottish Premier League	St Johnstone	1–1	Dundee United	McDiarmid Park
20:00	Craig 90+3'	BBC Report	Gauld 24'; Armstrong (yellow card) 79' (yellow-red card)	Attendance: 4,613; Referee: Brines

5 April 2013 Scottish Premier League	Inverness Caledonian Thistle	0–0	St Johnstone	Caledonian Stadium
19:45		BBC Report		Attendance: 3,744; Referee: Clancy

21 April 2013 Scottish Premier League	St Johnstone	2–2	Ross County	McDiarmid Park
16:00	MacLean 6'; Davidson 25'	BBC Report	Brittain 15' (Penalty), 76' (Penalty)	Attendance: 2,444; Referee: Collum

27 April 2013 Scottish Premier League	St Johnstone	1–0	Inverness Caledonian Thistle	McDiarmid Park
12:00	MacLean 77'	BBC Report	Raven (red card) 12'	Attendance: 2,368; Referee: Thomson

4 May 2013 Scottish Premier League	Dundee United	0–1	St Johnstone	Tannadice Park
15:00		BBC Report	Craig 38'	Attendance: 6,437; Referee: Norris

11 May 2012 Scottish Premier League	Celtic	4–0	St Johnstone	Celtic Park
12:15	Ledley 2'; Mulgrew 36'; Forrest 51'; Wright 90+1' (Own goal)	BBC Report		Attendance: 57,000; Referee: Muir

19 May 2013 Scottish Premier League	St Johnstone	2–0	Motherwell	McDiarmid Park
12:45	Craig 36'; Hasselbaink 47'	BBC Report		Attendance: 5,025; Referee: Mclean

=== Scottish League Cup ===
25 September 2012 Third round	St Johnstone	4–1	Queen's Park	McDiarmid Park
19:45	MacLean 18', 40'; Davidson 76'; Craig 85'	BBC Report; SFL Report	Keenan 30'; Robertson (red card) 74'	Attendance: 1,304; Referee: Clancy

30 October 2012 Quarter-finals	Celtic	5–0	St Johnstone	Celtic Park
19:45	Commons 28', 32', 58' (pen.); Hooper 38'; Mulgrew 61'	BBC Report		Attendance: 14,399; Referee: Madden

=== Scottish Cup ===
17 December 2012 Fourth round	Cowdenbeath	0–3	St Johnstone	Central Park
19:45		BBC Report	McCracken 54'; MacLean 76' (pen.); Tadé 87'	Attendance: 809; Referee: Beaton

2 February 2013 Fifth round	St Mirren	2–0	St Johnstone	St Mirren Park
15:00	Gonçalves 49', 56'	BBC Report		Attendance: 3,507; Referee: Thomson

=== UEFA Europa League ===
19 July 2012 Second qualifying round	(Turkey) Eskişehirspor	2–0	St Johnstone	Atatürk Stadium
19:00	Alper Potuk 41'; Wright 65' (o.g.)	UEFA Report; BBC Report		Attendance: 13,000; Referee: Vučemilović-Šimunović Jr.

26 July 2012 Second qualifying round	St Johnstone	1–1 (1–3 agg.)	(Turkey) Eskişehirspor	McDiarmid Park
19:45	Tadé 35'	BBC Report	Sarı 51'	Attendance: 6,024; Referee: Gumienny

== Player statistics ==
=== Captains ===
No.	P	Name	Country	No. games	Notes
2	DF	Mackay	(Scotland)	34	Club captain
8	MF	Davidson	(Scotland)	8	Vice-captain

Last updated: 19 May 2013
Source: Competitive match reports.
Competitive matches only
Matches started as captain only
Country: FIFA nationality; No.: Squad number; P: Position; Name: Player name; No. Games: Number of games started as captain.

=== Squad ===
Last updated 19 May 2013

No.	Pos	Nat	Player	Total		Premier League		Europa League		League Cup		Scottish Cup	
No.	Pos	Nat	Player	Apps	Goals	Apps	Goals	Apps	Goals	Apps	Goals	Apps	Goals
1	GK	(Northern Ireland) NIR	Alan Mannus	43	0	38+0	0	2+0	0	1+0	0	2+0	0
2	DF	(Scotland) SCO	Dave Mackay	36	3	32+0	3	0+1	0	1+0	0	2+0	0
3	DF	(Scotland) SCO	Callum Davidson	23	0	20+1	0	2+0	0	0+0	0	0+0	0
4	MF	(Republic of Ireland) IRL	Patrick Cregg	28	1	19+5	1	2+0	0	0+0	0	1+1	0
5	DF	(Scotland) SCO	Frazer Wright	38	1	35+0	1	2+0	0	0+0	0	1+0	0
6	DF	(Scotland) SCO	Steven Anderson	33	0	28+2	0	0+0	0	2+0	0	1+0	0
7	MF	(Scotland) SCO	Chris Millar	30	0	25+1	0	2+0	0	1+0	0	1+0	0
8	MF	(Scotland) SCO	Murray Davidson	37	8	31+1	7	2+0	0	2+0	1	1+0	0
9	FW	(France) FRA	Grégory Tadé	41	6	25+11	4	1+0	1	2+0	0	2+0	1
10	MF	(Scotland) SCO	Liam Craig	43	8	37+0	7	2+0	0	1+1	1	2+0	0
11	FW	(Netherlands) NED	Nigel Hasselbaink	42	7	15+21	7	1+1	0	1+1	0	1+1	0
12	MF	(Scotland) SCO	David Robertson	9	2	1+6	2	0+0	0	1+1	0	0+0	0
14	MF	(Scotland) SCO	Kevin Moon	4	0	0+1	0	0+1	0	2+0	0	0+0	0
14	FW	(Wales) WAL	Gwion Edwards	7	0	0+6	0	0+0	0	0+0	0	0+1	0
15	GK	(Northern Ireland) NIR	Jonathan Tuffey	1	0	0+0	0	0+0	0	1+0	0	0+0	0
16	FW	(Scotland) SCO	Craig Beattie	4	0	0+2	0	0+0	0	0+1	0	0+1	0
16	MF	(Wales) WAL	Michael Doughty	6	0	1+4	0	0+0	0	0+0	0	1+0	0
17	FW	(Scotland) SCO	Sean Higgins	5	0	1+2	0	1+1	0	0+0	0	0+0	0
17	FW	(Scotland) SCO	Steve MacLean	35	8	27+4	5	0+0	0	1+1	2	2+0	1
18	DF	(Scotland) SCO	David McCracken	22	1	15+1	0	2+0	0	2+0	0	2+0	1
19	DF	(Scotland) SCO	Gary Miller	21	0	13+4	0	2+0	0	2+0	0	0+0	0
20	MF	(Scotland) SCO	Jamie Adams	5	0	0+4	0	1+0	0	0+0	0	0+0	0
21	MF	(Algeria) ALG	Mehdi Abeid	13	0	9+3	0	0+0	0	0+0	0	0+1	0
22	MF	(Scotland) SCO	Peter Pawlett	9	0	7+2	0	0+0	0	0+0	0	0+0	0
23	FW	(England) ENG	Rowan Vine	37	7	28+7	7	0+0	0	1+0	0	1+0	0
26	MF	(Scotland) SCO	Liam Caddis	4	0	0+2	0	0+0	0	0+1	0	0+1	0
27	FW	(Scotland) SCO	Stevie May	5	0	0+3	0	0+2	0	0+0	0	0+0	0
33	DF	(Scotland) SCO	Tam Scobbie	21	0	11+7	0	0+0	0	1+0	0	2+0	0

=== Disciplinary record ===
Includes all competitive matches.

Last updated 19 May 2013

Number	Nation	Position	Name	Premier League		Europa League		League Cup		Scottish Cup		Total	
Number	Nation	Position	Name	Booked	Sent off (straight red)	Booked	Sent off (straight red)	Booked	Sent off (straight red)	Booked	Sent off (straight red)	Booked	Sent off (straight red)
1	(Northern Ireland)	GK	Alan Mannus	0	0	0	0	0	0	0	0	0	0
2	(Scotland)	DF	Dave Mackay	4	1	0	0	1	0	0	0	5	1
3	(Scotland)	DF	Callum Davidson	1	0	0	0	0	0	0	0	1	0
4	(Republic of Ireland)	MF	Patrick Cregg	9	0	0	0	0	0	1	0	10	0
5	(Scotland)	DF	Frazer Wright	8	0	0	0	0	0	0	0	8	0
6	(Scotland)	DF	Steven Anderson	3	1	0	0	1	0	0	0	4	1
7	(Scotland)	MF	Chris Millar	7	1	0	0	0	0	0	0	7	1
8	(Scotland)	MF	Murray Davidson	9	0	1	0	0	0	0	0	10	0
9	(France)	FW	Grégory Tadé	0	1	0	0	0	0	0	0	0	1
10	(Scotland)	MF	Liam Craig	8	0	0	0	0	0	1	0	9	0
11	(Netherlands)	FW	Nigel Hasselbaink	2	0	0	0	1	0	0	0	3	0
12	(Scotland)	MF	David Robertson	0	0	0	0	0	0	0	0	0	0
14	(Scotland)	MF	Kevin Moon	0	0	0	0	0	0	0	0	0	0
14	(Wales)	FW	Gwion Edwards	0	0	0	0	0	0	0	0	0	0
15	(Northern Ireland)	GK	Jonathan Tuffey	0	0	0	0	0	0	0	0	0	0
16	(Scotland)	FW	Craig Beattie	0	0	0	0	0	0	0	0	0	0
16	(Wales)	MF	Michael Doughty	1	0	0	0	0	0	0	0	1	0
17	(Scotland)	FW	Sean Higgins	0	0	0	0	0	0	0	0	0	0
17	(Scotland)	FW	Steve MacLean	5	0	0	0	0	0	0	0	5	0
18	(Scotland)	DF	David McCracken	0	0	0	0	0	0	0	0	0	0
19	(Scotland)	DF	Gary Miller	2	0	1	0	1	0	0	0	4	0
20	(Scotland)	MF	Jamie Adams	0	0	0	0	0	0	0	0	0	0
21	(Algeria)	MF	Mehdi Abeid	1	0	0	0	0	0	0	0	1	0
22	(Scotland)	MF	Peter Pawlett	3	0	0	0	0	0	0	0	3	0
23	(England)	FW	Rowan Vine	7	2	0	0	0	0	0	0	7	2
26	(Scotland)	MF	Liam Caddis	0	0	0	0	0	0	0	0	0	0
27	(Scotland)	FW	Stevie May	0	0	0	0	0	0	0	0	0	0
33	(Scotland)	DF	Tam Scobbie	0	0	0	0	0	0	1	0	1	0

== Team statistics ==
=== League table ===
Pos	Team	Pld	W	D	L	GF	GA	GD	Pts	Qualification or relegation
1	Celtic (C)	38	24	7	7	92	35	+57	79	Qualification for the Champions League second qualifying round
2	Motherwell	38	18	9	11	67	51	+16	63	Qualification for the Europa League third qualifying round
3	St Johnstone	38	14	14	10	45	44	+1	56	Qualification for the Europa League second qualifying round
4	Inverness Caledonian Thistle	38	13	15	10	64	60	+4	54	
5	Ross County	38	13	14	11	47	48	−1	53	

Source: SPFL Archive
Rules for classification: 1) points; 2) goal difference; 3) number of goals scored.
(C) Champions

=== Division summary ===
Round	1	2	3	4	5	6	7	8	9	10	11	12	13	14	15	16	17	18	19	20	21	22	23	24	25	26	27	28	29	30	31	32	33	34	35	36	37	38
Ground	A	A	H	A	H	H	A	A	H	H	A	H	A	H	A	H	A	H	A	A	H	H	A	H	A	A	H	H	A	A	H	H	A	H	H	A	A	H
Result	L	D	L	L	D	W	W	W	W	W	D	L	L	D	W	L	D	D	L	D	D	W	L	W	W	L	D	W	D	L	W	D	D	D	W	W	L	W
Position	12	10	12	11	11	10	9	7	4	2	4	5	5	4	4	6	6	5	6	7	7	6	6	5	4	6	5	4	5	5	5	5	4	4	4	4	4	3

Updated to match(es) played on 19 May 2013. Source:
A = Away; H = Home; W = Win; D = Draw; L = Loss

== Transfers ==
Chris Millar initially turned down a new deal but later re-signed.

=== Players in ===
Player	From	Fee
(Scotland) Tam Scobbie	(Scotland) Falkirk	Free
(Scotland) Gary Miller	(Scotland) Ross County	Free
(France) Grégory Tadé	(Scotland) Inverness Caledonian Thistle	Free
(Netherlands) Nigel Hasselbaink	(Scotland) St Mirren	Free
(Northern Ireland) Jonathan Tuffey	(Scotland) Inverness Caledonian Thistle	Free
(Republic of Ireland) Patrick Cregg	(England) Bury	Free
(England) Rowan Vine	(England) Queens Park Rangers	Free
(Scotland) Craig Beattie	(Scotland) Heart of Midlothian	Free
(Scotland) Peter Pawlett	(Scotland) Aberdeen	Loan
(Scotland) Chris Tobin	(Scotland) Heart of Midlothian	Free
(Scotland) Steve MacLean	(England) Yeovil Town	Free
(Wales) Michael Doughty	(England) Queens Park Rangers	Loan
(Algeria) Mehdi Abeid	(England) Newcastle United	Loan
(Wales) Gwion Edwards	(Wales) Swansea City	Loan

=== Players out ===
Player	To	Fee
(Spain) Francisco Sandaza	(Scotland) Rangers	Free
(England) Carl Finnigan	(Scotland) Dundee	Free
(Canada) Marcus Haber	(England) Stevenage	Free
(England) Jody Morris	(England) Bristol City	Free
(Scotland) Derek Riordan	(England) Bristol Rovers	Free
(Scotland) Michael Hart	(Scotland) Airdrie United	Free
(Republic of Ireland) Alan Maybury	(Scotland) Hibernian	Free
(Finland) Peter Enckelman	(Scotland) Heart of Midlothian	Free
(Scotland) Stevie May	(Scotland) Hamilton Academical	Loan
(Scotland) Ricky McIntosh	(Scotland) Montrose	Loan
(Scotland) Sean Higgins	(Scotland) Falkirk	Free
(Scotland) Mark Durnan	(Scotland) Queen of the South	Free
(Scotland) Liam Caddis	(Scotland) Cowdenbeath	Loan
(Scotland) Craig Beattie	(England) Barnet	Free
(Scotland) Kevin Moon	(Scotland) Alloa Athletic	Free
