= Murray Davidson =

Scottish footballer (born 1988)

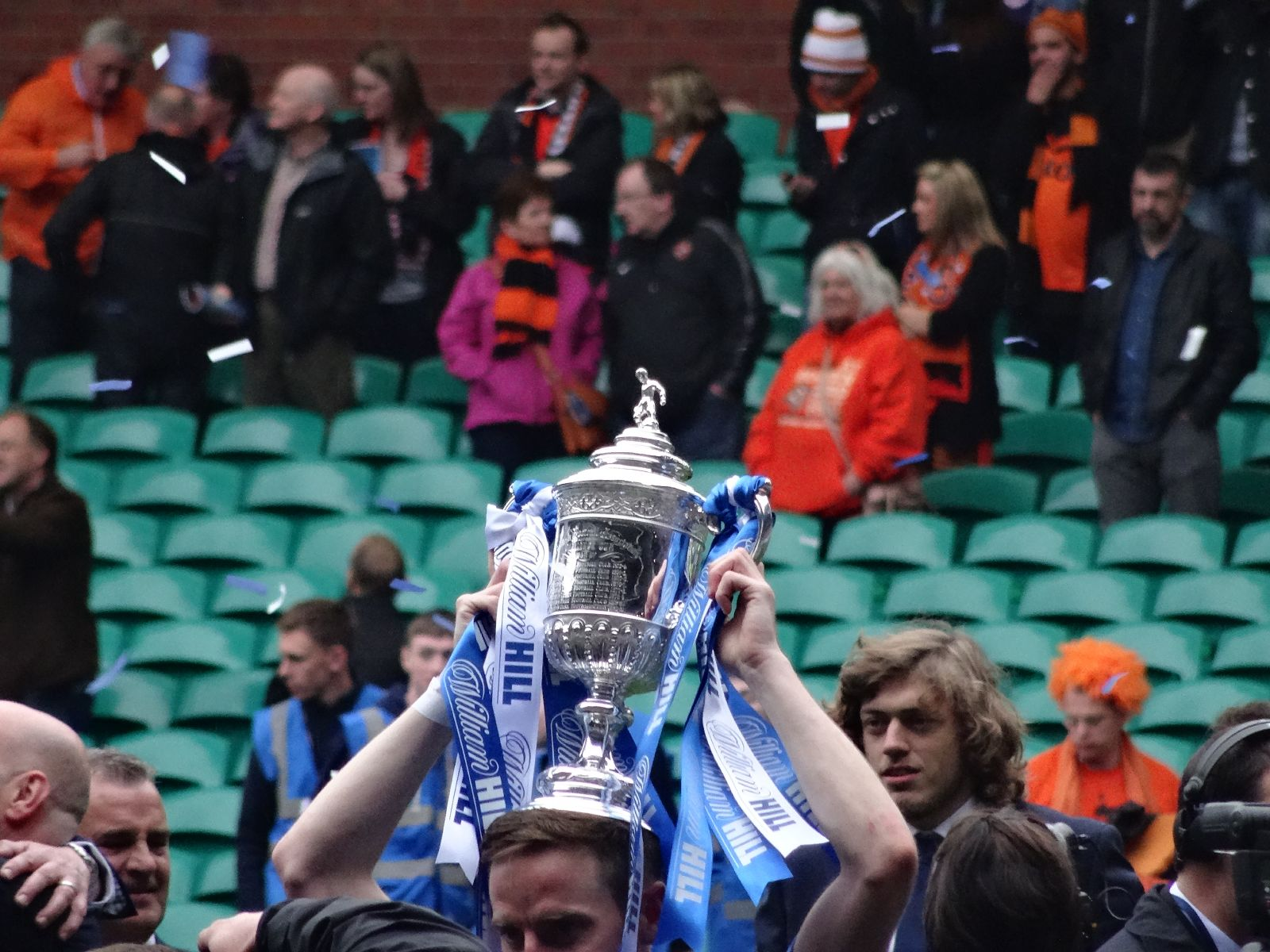

Personal information
- Date of birth: 7 March 1988 (age 38)
- Place of birth: Edinburgh, Scotland
- Position: Midfielder

Youth career
- 2003–2006: Livingston

Senior career*
Years	Team	Apps	(Gls)
2006–2009	Livingston	37	(7)
2007	→ Cowdenbeath (loan)	5	(0)
2009–2023	St Johnstone	340	(33)

International career
2010	Scotland U21	1	(0)
2012	Scotland	1	(0)
- * Club domestic league appearances and goals

Murray Davidson (born 7 March 1988) is a Scottish former footballer who played as a midfielder. He is most associated with a 14-year spell at St Johnstone, for whom he played over 300 league games, having started his career at Livingston. Davidson also played on loan for Cowdenbeath. He once played for Scotland in 2012.

== Early career ==
Born in Edinburgh, Davidson grew up in the small Borders town of Innerleithen to Ronnie and Liz Davidson. He attended Peebles High School.

Davidson began playing football at the local sports club Leithen Vale, in the same team as Ross Campbell, who would go on to represent Hibernian and Dunfermline Athletic, and Steven Notman, who was to play for Hibernian and Berwick Rangers. The team was the most successful in the sports club's history, winning countless trophies both at home and abroad, and a number of the boys, including Davidson, went on to play at a higher level. After appearing for Leithen Vale, he joined Livingston at sixteen years old and started his senior career with the club. However, his start at Livingston suffered a setback when Davidson suffered "prolonged injuries", but he managed to overcome the injuries.

== Club career ==
=== Livingston ===
Davidson made his Livingston debut, coming on as a substitute for Graham Dorrans in the 85th minute, in a 2–1 win against his future club, St Johnstone, on 25 November 2006. He made another appearance for the club, also as a substitute, in a 1–1 draw against Clyde on 9 December 2006. By the time Davidson was loaned out, he made only two appearances in the 2006–07 season. A month later, Davidson moved on loan to Scottish Third Division club Cowdenbeath. He made his debut for the club, starting the whole game, in a 1–1 draw against Greenock Morton on 27 January 2007. Davidson made five appearances for The Blue Brazil. He later spoke about his time at Cowdenbeath, stating the loan move helped his career and development.

In the 2007–08 season, Davidson made his first appearance of the season against Dundee on 11 March 2008, only for him to receive his first red card of his professional career for a second bookable offence, as Livingston loss 5–2. After serving a one match suspension, he returned to the first team, coming on as a second-half substitute, against Greenock Morton on 22 March 2008, only for him to receive a straight red card at the last minute of the game for a serious foul play, in a 1–1 draw. On the last game of the 2007–08 season, Davidson made six appearances and scored his first career goal – once more playing against St Johnstone– in the final game of the season, in a 5–2 loss. At the end of the 2007–08 season, he made six appearances and scoring once in all competitions. Following this, Davidson signed a two-year deal with the club.

The 2008–09 season proved to be a breakout season for Davidson, as he began to receive first team football at Livingston and formed a central–midfield partnership with Liam Fox. In a match against Ross County on 9 August 2008, Davidson set up a goal for Leigh Griffiths, in a 2–0 win. In a follow–up match against Greenock Morton, he scored his first goal of the season, in a 2–1 win. Davidson had to wait until on 27 September 2008 to score his second goal of the season, a 3–1 win against Partick Thistle. After missing one match due to an injury, he scored on his return, in a 4–1 win against Ross County on 13 December 2008. His return was short–lived when Davidson had a fitness concern that saw him out for one match. On 31 January 2009, he scored his fifth goal of the season, in a 4–2 win against Ross County. However, Davidson suffered an injury and was substituted in the 68th minute, during a 4–1 loss against Dundee on 21 February 2009. After returning to the first team from injury, he scored a brace against Dunfermline Athletic, in a 4–2 win on 10 March 2009. However, Davidson suffered a groin injury that saw him out for the rest of the 2008–09 season. At the end of the 2008–09 season, he went on to make thirty–five appearances and scoring six times in all competitions.

Shortly after the 2008–09 season was concluded, Davidson was linked a move away from Livingston, as he was subjected to a bid, alongside Dave Mackay from Scottish clubs like Dundee and Motherwell. Following the club's demotion to the Scottish Third Division, Davidson was critical of SFL's decision to punish Livingston, calling it "wrong" and believed that owner Angelo Massone was the one to blame. He also had a strained relationship with Massone, who at one point arranged for him to go on trial with Serie A side Parma, but turned down the chance.

=== St Johnstone ===
On 15 May 2009, Davidson transferred to St Johnstone and signed a three-year contract with the Saints, alongside Dave Mackay. He later revealed that they almost joined Dundee before the Saints won the race to sign the pair. Manager Steve Lomas, stated in the 2012 interview, praised his predecessor for his role of signing both players.

Upon joining the club, Davidson acknowledged about Livingston's financial problems, saying: "I have some close friends there and I have great sympathy for them. It must be a difficult time for the staff behind the scenes and I am particularly sorry for the supporters of the club who were very good to me. For their sake, I hope a solution can be found."

==== 2009–10 season ====
Davidson made his St Johnstone debut, starting the whole game, in a 5–0 win over Stenhousemuir in the Scottish League Cup. In a follow–up match, he scored his first goal for the Saints in the opening game of the season, drawing 2–2 against Motherwell. Two weeks later on 30 August 2009, Davidson scored again, in a 2–2 draw against Hearts. Since joining the club, he quickly became a regular first team player and made a significant impact.

His performance led to manager Derek McInnes successfully predicted that Davidson will be included in the Scotland squad one day. On 31 October 2009, he scored his third goal of the season, in a 3–1 win against Falkirk. On 30 March 2010, Davidson scored his fourth goal of the season against Rangers in a 4–1 win. In the last game of the season, Davidson scored his fifth goal of the season, in a 3–2 loss against Hamilton Academical.

Despite suffering injuries throughout his first season at St Johnstone, he made thirty–nine appearances and scoring five times in all competitions. Following this, it was announced on 13 May 2010 that Davidson signed a one-year contract extension with the Saints, keeping him until 2013.

==== 2010–11 season ====
Ahead of the 2010–11 season, Davidson said his aim was to improve scoring more goals than he did in the previous season. Davidson scored his first goal of the season, in a 2–1 win over Greenock Morton in the second round of the Scottish League Cup. In a follow–up match against Rangers on 28 August 2010, he suffered a head injury after clashing with Marcus Haber and was substituted in the 18th-minute, as St Johnstone went on to lose 2–1. However, this cost him his place for the Scotland U21 squad. But Davidson recovered and started the match, in a 2–0 loss against Motherwell on 11 September 2010.

Since the start of the 2010–11 season, he appeared in the first nine matches of the season until missing a match against Inverness Caledonian Thistle, due to an injury that saw him out for one match. But Davidson made his return to the starting line–up, starting the match, in a 2–1 win against Hamilton Academical on 23 October 2010. In a follow–up match, he scored his second goal of the season, in a 3–2 loss against Celtic in the quarter-final of the Scottish League Cup. However, by the end of the year, Davidson suffered three more injuries on two separate occasions.

Despite this, Davidson continued to remain in the first team, playing in the central midfield position. He then scored his third goal of the season, in a 2–0 win against Partick Thistle in the last 16 of the Scottish Cup. At the end of the 2010–11 season, he made forty-three appearances and scored three times in all competitions.

==== 2011–12 season ====
Ahead of the 2011–12 season, Davidson was at the centre of the transfer window when St Johnstone turned down a bid from Rangers for, which was believed to be in the region of £250,000. He was also linked with a move to English clubs, with from Wolves, Bolton and Everton.

Amid the transfer speculation, Davidson remained in the first team for St Johnstone and helped the club collect four points, including a 1–0 win over Celtic, giving the club their first win at Celtic Park since 1998. He scored his first goal of the season, but suffered an injury after attempting to tackle Andrew McNeil backfired and was substituted at half time, as St Johnstone won 3–0 against Livingston in the second round of the Scottish League Cup. After the match, it was announced that Davidson would be out between six and eight weeks. After being out for two months, he made his return to the first team from injury, coming on as a 64th-minute substitute, in a 2–0 win over Inverness Caledonian Thistle on 15 October 2011. However, his return was short–lived when he suffered a minor knee injury that saw him out for one match. But on 29 October 2011, Davidson made his return from injury, coming on as a 72nd-minute substitute, in a 1–0 loss against St Mirren.

Following his return from injury, he regained his first team place, playing in either central midfield or defensive midfield positions. When the January transfer window opened, Davidson continued to attract interest, mostly from Rangers and Bristol City. In response, manager Steve Lomas said he would sell him, but only for a valuation of £1 million. The transfer speculation caused a briefly strained relationship between him and the Saints supporters. Amid the transfer speculation, he scored his second goal of the season, in a 2–1 win against Brechin City in the fourth round of the Scottish Cup. Rangers' interest in signing Davidson ended when the club entered administration the following month.

After missing one match due to ankle injury in mid–February, he scored on his return against Hearts in the last 16 replay of the Scottish Cup but St Johnstone lose 2–0 and was eliminated from the tournament. A week later on 25 February 2012, Davidson scored his first league goal in over two years in a 3–1 win over Dunfermline Athletic. In a match against Hearts on 24 March 2012, he scored an equalising goal before being substituted with a knee injury in the 81st minute, as the Saints got their revenge, in a 2–1 win. After missing three matches, Davidson made his return to the starting line–up, in a 2–0 loss against Dundee United on 21 April 2012. Although his playing time was reduced, due to recurring injuries unlike his first-two season at the club, his contributions for St Johnstone saw the Saints qualify for a place in Europe despite finishing sixth place. At the end of the 2011–12 season, Davidson went on to make thirty–one appearances and scoring five times in all competitions.

==== 2012–13 season ====
Ahead of the 2012–13 season, Davidson was appointed as a vice-captain at St Johnstone. Prior to the match against Turkish side Eskişehirspor in the UEFA Europa League second qualifying round, he was given a captaincy in absence of Dave Mackay, describing it as a 'massive honour'. Davidson played in both legs as captain, but the opposition team proved to be too strong for the Saints, losing 2–0 away and drew 1–1 at home and was eliminated from the tournament. Following the club's elimination from the UEFA Europa League, he scored his first league goal of the season, in a 1–1 draw against Motherwell on 12 August 2012.

During a 2–1 win against Celtic on 15 September 2012, Davidson played 22 minutes before he was substituted. After the match, manager Lomas only revealed that Davidson was sick and had to be taken off as a result. A month later, on 25 September 2012, he scored his second goal of the season, and setting up one of the goals, in a 4–1 win against Queens Park in the last 16 of the Scottish League Cup. A week later, Davidson followed up by scoring on 6 October 2012 and 20 October 2012 against St Mirren and Kilmarnock respectively. Coincidentally, he added two more goals by the end of the year, also coming against Kilmarnock and St Mirren (which he was also a stand in captain in absence of Dave Mackay). As his contract was set to expire at the end of the 2012–13 season, talks over a new contract has started between the two parties in mid-December by offering him a two-year deal. However, on 11 January 2013, Davidson turned down a new deal from the club and also rejected a pre-contract offer from Rangers, announcing his intention to move to England.

By the second half of the season, Davidson was plagued with injuries and suspension that saw him out on four separate occasions. Amid the transfer speculation and injuries, he set up two goals for St Johnstone, in a 3–1 win against Hibernian on 11 February 2013. By the end of February, Davidson said that his target was to lead the Saints to third-place finish and refused to rule out staying with the club for another season. He then scored his seventh goal of the season, in a 2–0 win against Kilmarnock on 9 March 2013. A month later on 21 April 2013, Davidson scored his eighth goal of the season, in a 2–2 draw against Ross County. In the last game of the season, he played his last match for St Johnstone, starting the whole game against Motherwell and helped the Saints win 2–0 to seal third place finish in the league and qualify for Europe again. After the match, Davidson expressed his "sadness" at leaving the club. At the end of the 2012–13 season, he made thirty–seven appearances and scoring eight times in all competitions, making him a joint top scorer with Liam Craig and Steven MacLean. Following this, Davidson was awarded the Auchterarder Supporters Club Player of the Year, Clubman of the Year, SJFC Business Club Player of the Year and Blues Boys Player of the Year at St Johnstone's award ceremony.

==== 2013–14 season ====
As his contract ended, Davidson was told by the club he could return in the future if his search for a new club in England was unsuccessful. This came after when no English clubs move forward to start negotiating in signing him. Following St Johnstone's win over Rosenberg in the Europa League, Davidson rejoined the club on a one-year contract after failing to secure a move south. Afterwards, he said re-signing for St Johnstone made him feel wanted there.

Davidson's first game after rejoining the club came in the first leg of their Europa League third qualifying round tie, coming on as a 51st-minute substitute in a 1–0 win over Belarusian side Minsk. However, he did not play in the next leg, due to illness as St Johnstone were eliminated by Minsk after a penalty shootout. Since returning to the first team, Davidson regained his first team place, playing mostly in the central midfield position.

In a match against Celtic on 21 September 2013, he suffered a knee injury and was substituted, as the Saints loss 2–1. But on 28 September 2013, Davidson made his return to the starting line–up, in a 1–1 draw against Partick Thistle. However, his knee injury continued to be a recurrence for him, resulting in him to miss one match in October. During a 0–0 draw against Hibernian on 21 December 2013, he suffered ankle injury and was substituted in the 30th minute. But Davidson quickly recovered and returned to the starting line–up, in a 1–0 loss against Celtic on 26 December 2013. He scored his first goal of the season in a 2–0 win over St Mirren on 11 January 2014. However, in a follow–up match against Hearts, Davidson tore his patellar tendon and was substituted in the 37th minute, as St Johnstone drew 3–3. After having knee surgery, Manager Tommy Wright announced that Davidson was unlikely to play for the rest of the season.

While on the sidelines, the club won winning the Scottish Cup, their first major trophy in their 130-year history following a 2–0 win against Dundee United. Though it was a success for the Saints to win the Scottish Cup, he expressed his disappointment to not play in the final due to injury and did not watch the match as a result but "missing out made him more hungry to get that chance again". On 30 May 2014, Davidson signed a short-term contract with the club until August, as he received approval from St Johnstone to give him more time to make a recovery from his serious injury. At the end of the 2013–14 season, Davidson made twenty–four appearances and scoring once in all competitions.

==== 2014–15 season ====
While rehabilitating, Davidson missed the St Johnstone's UEFA Europa League campaign and managed to recover from a knee injury, where he played 70 minutes against Ross County's under-20s. On 26 August 2014, Davidson signed a new contract extension with the Saints until the end of the 2014–15 season. Following this, the club's manager Tommy Wright believed the player will his comeback as better than ever, describing him as a "new player".

On 20 September 2014, Davidson made his first appearance of the season, coming on as a 79th-minute substitute for Gary McDonald, in a 2–1 loss against Inverness Caledonian Thistle. Four weeks after his return on 20 October 2014, he scored his first goal of the season, in a 2–1 loss against Kilmarnock. However, during the quarter–finals of the Scottish League Cup match against Rangers, Davidson was involved in a clash with Nicky Law and was substituted in the 23rd minute, as St Johnstone went on to lose 1–0. After the match, he taken to the hospital and it was revealed that he had a concussion, though he did not suffer a serious facial injury as first feared. After being out of action for three weeks, Davidson made his return from injury, coming on as a 68th-minute substitute, in a 1–0 win against Ross County on 22 November 2014.

After missing one match due to an abscess surgery, he then injured his knee during training, which kept him out for three weeks. But Davidson made his return to the starting line–up, in a 1–1 draw against Aberdeen on 23 January 2015. In a follow–up match against Motherwell, he scored his second goal of the season, in a 1–1 draw However, his return was short–lived once again when he suffered a calf injury in the 15th minute and was substituted as a result, as the Saints lose 2–1 on 14 February 2015. Shortly after being out for one match, Davidson signed a two–year contract with the club. On 28 February 2015, he made his return from injury, starting the whole game, in a 0–0 draw against Kilmarnock.

However, Davidson suffered a knee injury during a match against Hamilton Academical on 4 April 2015 and was substituted at half-time, as St Johnstone drew 1–1. After the match, he was expected to be out of action for ten days. On 25 April 2015, Davidson made his return to the starting line–up, in a 2–0 win against Dundee. Two weeks later on 9 May 2015, he scored his third goal of the season, in a 1–1 draw against Dundee United. On the last game of the season, Davidson helped the Saints beat Aberdeen 1–0 to help the club qualify for the UEFA Europa League for the third year running. At the end of the 2014–15 season, he made twenty–seven appearances and scoring three times in all competitions. Following this, Davidson was awarded the Community Involvement Award alongside Lee Croft at the St Johnstone's award ceremony.

==== 2015–16 season ====
Ahead of the 2015–16 season, Davidson spoke about St Johnstone playing in Europe prior to the match against FC Alashkert in the first qualifying round of the UEFA Europa League. However, in the first leg, he started the match, only for him to be taken off in the 44th minute after damaging his knee, as the Saints loss 1–0. After the match, there were suggestion that his injury could see him out for most of the season. The outcome later showed that although it was not as bad as first feared, Davidson would still be out for three months. His absence in the second leg saw the club eliminated in the return leg, due to an away goal. But by late–July, he quickly made progress on his recovery and returned to training soon after.

Davidson made his return to the starting line–up, in a 1–1 draw against Inverness Caledonian Thistle on 8 August 2015. Since returning from injury, he regained his first team place, playing in either central midfield or defensive midfield positions. However, Davidson suffered two separate injuries that saw him substituted before half time in two matches between 29 August 2015 and 12 September 2015 against Celtic and Hamilton Academical. After being placed on the substitute bench in the next match, he returned to the starting line–up against Rangers in the last 16 of the Scottish Cup and scored first goal of the season, in a 3–1 win. On 21 November 2015, Davidson scored his second goal of the season, in a 2–1 win against Dundee United. Two weeks later on 5 December 2015, he was unfortunate to score an own goal against Ross County before St Johnstone went on to win 3–2.

In a match against Motherwell on 30 December 2015, Davidson played 36 minutes before being substituted, due to an injury. But he quickly recovered and returned to the starting line–up, in a 1–0 loss against Kilmarnock in the fourth round of the Scottish Cup on 9 January 2016. His eighteen consecutive starts for the Saints this season came to an end on 6 February 2016 when Davidson was suspended for accumulating five yellow cards, as well as, hip problem. He made his return from the sideline, starting the whole game, in a 2–0 loss against Dundee on 12 February 2016. However, his return was short–lived when Davidson suffered a concussion in an accidental collision and was substituted in the 15th minute, in a 2–1 loss against Partick Thistle on 23 February 2016. After missing one match, he returned to the starting line–up against Partick Thistle once again on 2 March 2016, which the club lose 2–1. Two weeks later, on 16 March 2016, Davidson scored twice for St Johnstone, in a 3–0 win against Hearts.

However, he suffered three separate injuries towards the end of the 2015–16 season. Despite this, Davidson went on to make thirty–four appearances and scoring four times in all competitions. Following this, he signed a new three-year contract with the Saints, which would take him to ten years with the club.

==== 2016–17 season ====
Having made four starts to the 2016–17 season, Davidson said that he hoped to maintain his fitness and avoid injuries again, having did so on two separate occasions earlier in July. However, Davidson suffered a sickness bug that saw him out for one match. After missing one match, he returned to the starting line–up, in a 1–0 win against Hearts on 17 September 2016.

Davidson started in the next five matches before suffering ankle injury in a warm up match prior to the Rangers match on 26 October 2016 and was out for four matches. His recovery from his recurrence injuries earned him a nickname "Mr Miracle" by local newspaper, The Courier. He returned to the starting line–up against Inverness Caledonian Thistle on 3 December 2016 and scored his first goal of the season, in a 3–0 win. After the match, manager Tommy Wright praised his performance, calling him "one of the fittest lads here" and that "he's one of the only ones who could throw back in like that", while also acknowledging that St Johnstone missed his at the same time. Davidson's return was praised by manager Tommy Wright, due to having "good level of consistency about his performances" and "a strong runner, who can covers the pitch as well in the 90th minute as in the first minute."

Three weeks later on 23 December 2016, Davidson scored his second goal of the season, in a 1–0 win against Kilmarnock. After being out of the first team in early–January, due to suspension and illness, he scored on his return, in a 3–0 win against Hamilton Academical on 28 January 2017. However, his return was short lived when Davidson suffered a hip injury and was substituted in the 13th minute, as the Saints won 2–0 on 18 February 2017. After the match and undergoing a hip injection, he was out for two matches. But on 11 March 2017, Davidson returned to the first team, coming on as a 78th-minute substitute, in a 2–0 win against Dundee.

However, he was later out of the first team on two separate occasions, due to injuries for the rest of the season. Despite this, his contributions saw the Saints qualify for the UEFA Europa League next season. At the end of the 2016–17 season, Davidson made twenty–six appearances and scoring three times in all competitions. For his performance, he was awarded Disabled Supporters Club Player of the Year at the club's award ceremony.

==== 2017–18 season ====
However, at the start of the 2017–18 season, Davidson missed the first leg of the UEFA Europa League first qualifying round against FK Riteriai, due to his recovery following his ankle injury, as St Johnstone loss 2–1. But he made his return to the starting line–up in the second leg, as the Saints went on to lose 3–1 on aggregate and was eliminated from the tournament. Davidson then scored his first goal of the season, in a 4–1 win against Motherwell on 12 August 2017. In a match against Celtic on 26 August 2017, he accidentally collided with teammate Aaron Comrie and was knocked unconscious and was substituted in the 8th minute, in a 1–1 draw. But Davidson recovered and was included in the starting line–up against Hibernian on 9 September 2017, only for him to be substituted at half–time after he suffered a bout of sickness. After the match, manager Tommy Wright criticised Davidson for declaring himself fit to play after illness and decided to be substituted.

After missing one match due to his illness, he scored on his return, in a 2–1 win against Hamilton Academical on 25 September 2017. After the match, Davidson reflected on his action, saying: "looking back, it was the worst thing he could have done." After missing two matches on two separate occasions between late–October and early–November, Davidson scored his third goal of the season and setting up the winning goal, in a 2–1 win against Hibernian on 18 November 2017. However, his return was short–lived when he suffered ankle injury and was substituted in the 25th minute, as the club loss 3–0 on 13 December 2017. After the match, it was expected that Davidson would be out for three or four weeks. But on 30 December 2017, he returned to the starting line–up against Dundee but received a yellow card (causing him to be suspended for one match, due to accumulating five yellow cards) as St Johnstone loss 2–0. After serving a one match suspension, Davidson regained his first team place, playing in the central midfield position in the first four months of 2018.

On 24 February 2018, he scored twice for the Saints, in a 2–0 win against Ross County. After the match, manager Tommy Wright praised Davidson's performance to end the club's winless home match in five months. In a follow–up match against Rangers, he suffered an injury and was substituted in the 58th minute, as St Johnstone loss 4–1. But Davidson recovered and returned to the starting line–up, in a 2–0 loss against Kilmarnock on 7 March 2018. He continued to receive yellow cards that saw him serve a two match suspension and did not return to the starting line–up, in a 5–1 win against Motherwell on 5 May 2018. At the end of the 2017–18 season, Davidson made thirty–three appearances and scoring five times in all competitions. Following this, he signed a two-year contract with the Saints, with an option for a third year that is contingent on appearances. Shortly after signing a new contract with the club, Davidson said he is ready to take up a leadership role at St Johnstone.

==== 2018–19 season ====
At the start of the 2018–19 season, Davidson remains one of the few senior players at St Johnstone following the departure of Alan Mannus, Steven MacLean and Chris Millar. He started five matches in the Scottish League Cup that saw St Johnstone qualify for the knockout stage. Davidson also made his 300th appearance for the Saints against Queen of the South and set up two goals, in a 4–2 win. However, in a match against Dundee on 25 August 2018, he suffered ankle injury and was substituted in the 15th minute, as the club won 1–0. After the match, it was announced that Davidson would be out for six weeks.

On 20 October 2018, he made his return from injury, starting the whole game, in a 1–0 win against Motherwell. After missing one match due to an illness, Davidson scored on his return to the starting line–up, in a 4–0 win against Hamilton Academical on 10 November 2018. However, his return was short–lived when he suffered a knee injury and was substituted in the 16th minute, in a 1–0 win against St Mirren. After being out for four weeks, Davidson scored on his return from injury, in a 1–0 win against his former club, Livingston, on 23 January 2019. After the match, manager Tommy Wright praised his return and earning himself a goal sheet.

Following his return from injury, he regained his first team place, playing in the central midfield position. Davidson then made his 200th appearance in the top–flight, in a 2–0 loss against Aberdeen on 23 February 2019. On 11 May 2019, he scored his third goal of the season, in a 2–0 win against Motherwell. At the end of the 2018–19 season, Davidson made thirty–four appearances and scoring three times in all competitions. Reflecting on his tenth season at St Johnstone, he said: "I got presented with a shirt with 300 on it but that was for 300 appearances, not starts. It's not the sort of thing I pay much attention to. It's a good milestone though and hopefully there will be many more. I didn't set myself a target anywhere near 300. I just wanted to play as often as I could and this is my 10th season. A lot of people say that I'm injury-prone but 325 games and 300 starts in 10 seasons isn't a bad total. I'll miss three or four games here and there – that's just the way I play – but I haven't been out as long as folk think. It's over 30 games a season which isn't bad going. Hopefully I'll have many more here."

==== 2019–20 season ====
Ahead of the 2019–20 season, Davidson said he is expecting to face new competition while giving young players advice at the same time. Since the start of the 2019–20 season, Davidson continued to be in the first team regular, playing in either central midfield or defensive midfield positions. Following a 4–0 loss against Rangers, manager Tommy Wright revealed that Davidson suffered a knee injury, but quickly recovered and returned to the starting line–up, in a 1–0 loss against Motherwell on 28 September 2019.

After recovering a leg injury in early–November, manager Tommy Wright described him as a "throwback" player, due to being a highly influential player in the squad. In a match against Aberdeen on 24 November 2019, he received a straight red card in the 74th minute for a challenge on Craig Bryson, in a 1–1 draw. After serving a two match suspension, Davidson returned to the starting line–up, in a 1–0 win against Hearts on 14 December 2019. A month later on 18 January 2020, he scored his first goal of the season, in a 3–0 win against Greenock Morton in the fourth round of the Scottish Cup. However, Davidson suffered an arm injury while training and was out for the rest of the season.

The season was curtailed because of the COVID-19 pandemic. By the time the season curtailed ended, he made twenty–one appearances and scoring once in all competitions. Davidson revealed that he earned himself a testimonial season, having spent ten seasons at St Johnstone. On 29 May 2020, Davidson signed a contract extension with the Saints, keeping him until 2021. Upon signing at the club, he intended to stay at St Johnstone for the rest of his career.

==== 2020–21 season ====
Ahead of the 2020–21 season, Davidson said he is looking forward to play under the new management of Callum Davidson. However, Davidson suffered an Achilles tendon problems that saw him out for the start of the season. But he made his return to the first team from injury, coming on as an 83rd-minute substitute, in a 1–0 win against St Mirren on 29 August 2020. Davidson scored his first goal of the season, in a 7–0 win against Brechin City in the Scottish League Cup. Following his return from injury, he began playing in the defensive midfield position under the new management of Callum Davidson.

In a match against Motherwell on 21 November 2020, Davidson suffered an injury after he fell "awkwardly when challenging for a header in midfield" and was substituted in the 30th minute, as St Johnstone drew 1–1. After missing two matches, he returned to the first team, coming on as an 84th-minute substitute, in a 2–1 against his former club, Livingston, on 12 December 2020. In the semi–finals of the Scottish League Cup, Davidson helped the Saints reach the 2021 Scottish League Cup final by beating Hibernian 3–0. After the match, newspaper The Herald said about Davidson's performance: "He was tenacious and determined in front of the defence, more than justified his selection from the off." Davidson scored his second goal of the season, in a 3–2 win against Kilmarnock in a follow–up match. However, in a match against Rangers on 3 February 2021, he was fouled by Kemar Roofe that saw him injured his calf, substituted in the 36th minute and subsequently saw Roofe sent–off, as the club loss 1–0. Despite optimism from manager Callum Davidson, Murray Davidson, unfortunately, missed the Scottish Cup League final, which St Johnstone won 1–0 against his former club, Livingston. After the Saints won the Scottish League Cup final, he expressed his devastation to not play in the final despite being part of the squad.

After being out for three months, Davidson made his return to the first team, coming on as an 83rd-minute substitute, in a 3–0 win against Hibernian on 1 May 2021. However, his return was short–lived when he tested positive for COVID-19 amid the COVID-19 pandemic in Scotland. But Davidson made his return to the starting line–up against Livingston in the last game of the season and helped the Saints qualify for the Europe next season. Two days later on 17 May 2021, he signed a one–year contract extension with the club. Having missed St Johnstone's previous finals in the past, Davidson finally made an appearance in the final, coming on as an 84th-minute substitute, in a 1–0 win against Hibernian, resulting in the Saints winning a double this season. After the match, he said playing in the final "had been a long wait, but this makes it worth it." At the end of the 2020–21 season, Davidson made twenty–eight appearances and scoring two times in all competitions.

==== 2021–22 season ====
Prior to the third qualifying round of the UEFA Europa League against Galatasaray, Davidson said he was looking forward for the match, citing its supporters and the atmosphere around it. Davidson played in the both legs of the third qualifying round of the UEFA Europa League, in a 5–3 loss on aggregate against Galatasaray and was demoted to the UEFA Europa Conference League. He played in the both legs of the UEFA Europa Conference League play–off round against LASK, in a 3–1 loss on aggregate and was eliminated from the tournament as well. After the match, Davidson suffered a shoulder injury that saw him out for two matches.

On 18 September 2021, he made his return to the starting line–up, in a 1–0 win against Aberdeen. However, his return was short–lived when Davidson suffered a back injury that saw him out for two matches. But he made his return to the first team from injury, coming on as a 78th-minute substitute, in a 3–0 loss against his former club, Livingston on 16 October 2021. Shortly after, his niggling injury caused him to miss one match. However, Davidson suffered an Achilles tendon problems that saw him out for two matches. But on 22 December 2021, he made his return to the starting line–up, in a 2–1 loss against Ross County.

After missing one match by December, Davidson made his return from the sidelines, starting a match and played 80 minutes, in a 2–0 loss against Hearts on 18 January 2022. By February, he suffered an injury that saw him out for one match. On 19 February 2022, Davidson made his return from injury, starting a match, in a 2–1 win against Hearts. However, his return was short–lived once again when he missed three matches, due to being dropped from the starting eleven. On 19 March 2022, Davidson returned to the starting line–up, in a 2–1 win against Motherwell.

Following his return from injury, he regained his first team place, playing in either central midfield or defensive midfield positions. On 2 April 2022, Davidson made his 400th appearance for St Johnstone, in a 1–0 win against Livingston. After missing one match, he returned to the Saints' starting eleven against Inverness Caledonian Thistle in both legs of the league's play–off final and helped the club win 6–2 on aggregate to retain their league status next season. At the end of the 2021–22 season, Davidson went on to make thirty–one appearances in all competitions. Having been keen on playing for St Johnstone on his fourteenth season, he signed a contract extension with Saints for another season.

==== 2022–23 season ====
At the start of the 2022–23 season, Davidson appeared three times as captain for St Johnstone in the Scottish League Cup matches. In the opening game of the season against Hibernian, however, he received a straight red card in a 58th minute for a foul on Ryan Porteous, in a 1–0 loss. After the match, the Saints announced their intention to appeal Davidson's red card, which was unsuccessful. After serving a two match suspension, Davidson returned to the first team, coming on as a 63rd-minute substitute, in a 1–0 loss against Aberdeen on 20 August 2022.

However, upon returning to the first team, he struggled to get game time throughout the 2022–23 season, due to competitions and his own injury concerns. On 25 May 2023, Davidson announced that he would be retiring from professional football at the end of the 2022–23 season. Shortly after the announcement, Davidson made his last appearance for the Saints, coming on as a late minute substitute, in a 2–0 win against his former club, Livingston.

== International career ==
Davidson won his first Scotland under-21 cap on 10 August 2010, in a 1–1 draw with Sweden in a friendly. This came at the third time of asking after being previously called up, but having to withdraw through injury.

On 15 November 2010, Davidson was called up by Scotland manager Craig Levein to the full squad for the first time, to face the Faroe Islands in a friendly on 16 November 2010 at Pittodrie, Aberdeen. He was also included in the Scotland squad to face Brazil in March 2011, but did not make an appearance. He was again selected for the Scotland squad in November 2012, called up by caretaker manager Billy Stark for a friendly against Luxembourg. Davidson made his only full international debut in this match, replacing Jordan Rhodes in the 89th minute, as Scotland won 2–1. As a result, he became the first serving St Johnstone player to be selected for Scotland since Sandy McLaren in 1932. Davidson described making an appearance for Scotland as his biggest and proudest honour of his career.

== Personal life ==
In June 2012, Davidson invested money in two greyhounds, one called Relegation Battle and the second called David Reid who between them won a dozen races that year. He has two children.

Davidson spoke about supporting ban children from heading balls, due to links between football and dementia; amid to his own health concerns he had during his playing career. Outside of football, he enjoys fishing.

== Career statistics ==
As of match played 13 May 2022

Appearances and goals by club, season and competition
Club	Season	League			Scottish Cup		League Cup		Other		Total	
Club	Season	Division	Apps	Goals	Apps	Goals	Apps	Goals	Apps	Goals	Apps	Goals
Livingston	2006–07	Scottish First Division	2 (Note: Includes one match not recorded on Soccerbase. "Livingston 1–1 Clyde". BBC Sport. 9 December 2006.)	0	0	0	0	0	0	0	2	0
Livingston	2007–08	Scottish First Division	6	1	0	0	0	0	0	0	6	1
Livingston	2008–09	Scottish First Division	29	6	0	0	3	0	3 (Note: Appearances in the Scottish Challenge Cup) (Note: Includes two Scottish Challenge Cup matches not recorded on Soccerbase. "Livingston 4–0 Stranraer". BBC Sport. 26 July 2008. & "Livingston 0–2 Partick Thistle". BBC Sport. 7 September 2008.)	0	35	6
Livingston	Total		37	7	0	0	3	0	3	0	43	7
Cowdenbeath (loan)	2006–07	Scottish Second Division	5	0	1	0	0	0	0	0	6	0
St Johnstone	2009–10	Scottish Premier League	33	5	2	0	4	0	—		39	5
St Johnstone	2010–11	Scottish Premier League	34	0	5	1	3	2	—		42	3
St Johnstone	2011–12	Scottish Premier League	26	2	3	2	1	0	—		30	4
St Johnstone	2012–13	Scottish Premier League	32	7	1	0	2	1	2 (Note: Appearances in the UEFA Europa League)	0	37	8
St Johnstone	2013–14	Scottish Premiership	21	1	1	0	1	0	1	0	24	1
St Johnstone	2014–15	Scottish Premiership	23	3	2	0	2	0	0	0	27	3
St Johnstone	2015–16	Scottish Premiership	30	3	1	0	3	1	1	0	35	4
St Johnstone	2016–17	Scottish Premiership	23	3	1	0	2	0	—		26	3
St Johnstone	2017–18	Scottish Premiership	29	5	2	0	1	0	1	0	33	5
St Johnstone	2018–19	Scottish Premiership	28	3	1	0	5	0	—		34	3
St Johnstone	2019–20	Scottish Premiership	17	0	1	1	3	0	—		21	1
St Johnstone	2020–21	Scottish Premiership	21	1	1	0	6	1	—		28	2
St Johnstone	2021–22	Scottish Premiership	23	0	0	0	1	0	4 (Note: Two appearances in UEFA Europa League and two appearances in UEFA Europa Conference League)	0	28	0
St Johnstone	Total		340	33	21	4	34	5	9	0	404	42
Career total			382	40	22	4	37	5	12	0	453	49

== Honours ==
St Johnstone

- Scottish Cup: 2013–14, 2020–21
- Scottish League Cup: 2020–21
