= 2010–11 St Johnstone F.C. season =

St Johnstone
2010–11 season
- Chairman: Geoff Brown
- Manager: Derek McInnes
- Stadium: McDiarmid Park
- Scottish Premier League: Eighth place
- Scottish Cup: Semi-final
- League Cup: Quarter-final
- Top goalscorer: League: Sam Parkin (4); All: Sam Parkin (5)
- Highest home attendance: 6,886 vs. Celtic, SPL, 30 October 2010
- Lowest home attendance: 1,530 vs. Morton, League Cup, 24 August 2010
Home colours	Away colours	Third colours

The 2010–11 season for St Johnstone is the club's second back in the Scottish Premier League. They will compete in the Scottish Premier League, Scottish Cup and the Scottish League Cup during the campaign.

== Results and fixtures ==
=== Scottish Premier League ===
14 August 2010 SPL	Heart of Midlothian	1–1	St Johnstone	Tynecastle Park
	Elliot 45'	BBC Sport	Parkin 45'; Anderson (red card) 73'	Attendance: 14,562; Referee: Stevie O'Reilly

21 August 2010 SPL	St Johnstone	0–1	Aberdeen	McDiarmid Park
		BBC Sport	Mackie 86'	Attendance: 6,523; Referee: Steven McLean

28 August 2010 SPL	Rangers	2–1	St Johnstone	Ibrox Stadium
	Papac 33'; Miller 79'	BBC Sport	Grainger 25'	Attendance: 46,109; Referee: Calum Murray

11 September 2010 SPL	St Johnstone	0–2	Motherwell	McDiarmid Park
		BBC Sport	Blackman 3'; Rutkiewicz 39' (Og.)	Attendance: 3,254; Referee: Iain Brines

18 September 2010 SPL	St Johnstone	2–1	St Mirren	McDiarmid Park
	Jackson 3'; Parkin 33'	BBC Sport	Lynch 37'	Attendance: 3,349; Referee: John McKendrick

25 September 2010 SPL	Dundee United	1–0	St Johnstone	Tannadice Park
	Goodwillie 33'	BBC Sport		Attendance: 7,397; Referee: Brian Winter

2 October 2010 SPL	St Johnstone	2–0	Hibernian	McDiarmid Park
	Craig 76'; Haber 90+1'	BBC Sport		Attendance: 3,819; Referee: Dougie McDonald

16 October 2010 SPL	Inverness CT	1–1	St Johnstone	Caledonian Stadium
	Hayes 71'	BBC SPORT	Samuel 8'	Attendance: 4,883; Referee: Alan Muir

23 October 2010 SPL	Hamilton Academical	1–2	St Johnstone	New Douglas Park
	Mensing 68 pen.'	BBC Sport	Parkin 19'; Grainger 86'	Attendance: 2,431; Referee: Mike Tumilty

30 October 2010 SPL	St Johnstone	0–3	Celtic	McDiarmid Park
	Grainger (yellow card) 87' (red card)	BBC Sport	McGinn 2', 89'; Izaguirre 41'	Attendance: 6,866; Referee: Calum Murray

6 November 2010 SPL	St Johnstone	0–3	Kilamrnock	McDiarmid Park
		BBC Sport	Duberry 37 o.g.' Sammon 83'; Kelly 90+4'	Attendance: 3,230; Referee: Iain Brines

10 November 2010 SPL	Motherwell	4–0	St Johnstone	Fir Park
	Blackman 12' (24), 45+1'; Sutton 88'	BBC Sport		Attendance: 3,361; Referee: Crawford Allan

13 November 2010 SPL	St Johnstone	0–2	Heart of Midlothian	McDiarmid Park
		BBC Sport	Kyle 64 pen.' Stevenson 90+4'	Attendance: 4,156; Referee: Mike Tumilty

20 November 2010 SPL	Aberdeen	0–1	St Johnstone	Pittodrie
	McArdle (red card) 47'	BBC Sport	Diamond 83 o.g.'	Attendance: 7,841; Referee: William Collum

27 November 2010 SPL	Hibernian	0–0	St Johnstone	Easter Road
		BBC SPORT		Attendance: 10,248; Referee: Christian Lautiar

11 December 2010 SPL	St Mirren	1–2	St Johnstone	St Mirren Park
	Higdon 62'	BBC Sport	Parkin 53'; Craig 90'	Attendance: 2,701; Referee: Stephen Finnie

26 December 2010 SPL	Celtic	2–0	St Johnstone	Celtic Park
	Du-Ri 90+1'; Ki 90+3'	BBC Sport		Attendance: 41,522; Referee: Calum Murray

2 January 2011 SPL	St Johnstone	1–0	Inverness CT	McDiarmid Park
	Samuel 85'	BBC Sport		Attendance: 3,126; Referee: George Salmond

15 January 2011 SPL	Kilmarnock	1–1	St Johnstone	Rugby Park
	Sammon 16'	BBC SPORT	Taylor 86'	Attendance: 4,885; Referee: Steven McLean

22 January 2011 SPL	St Johnstone	0–0	St Mirren	McDiarmid Park
		BBC SPORT		Attendance: 3,009; Referee: William Collum

26 January 2011 SPL	St Johnstone	1–0	Motherwell	McDiarmid Park
	Craig 62' (pen.)	BBC Sport		Attendance: 2,268; Referee: Calum Murray

29 January 2011 SPL	Heart of Midlothian	1–0	St Johnstone	Tynecastle Park
	Skácel 3'	BBC Sport		Attendance: 14,250; Referee: Crawford Allan

1 February 2011 SPL	St Johnstone	2–0	Hamilton Academical	McDiarmid Park
	May 4', 46'	BBC Sport		Attendance: 2,631; Referee: Euan Norris

19 February 2011 SPL	Inverness CT	2–0	St Johnstone	Caledonian Stadium
	Tokely 28'; Duncan 62'	BBC Sport		Attendance: 3,942; Referee: William Collum

22 February 2011 SPL	St Johnstone	0–0	Dundee United	McDiarmid Park
		BBC SPORT		Attendance: 3,507; Referee: John McKendrick

27 February 2011 SPL	Rangers	4–0	St Johnstone	Ibrox Stadium
	Jelavić 5', 90+2'; Lafferty 41'; Papac 62'	BBC Sport		Attendance: 43,125; Referee: Steven McLean

2 March 2011 SPL	St Johnstone	0–0	Aberdeen	McDiarmid Park
		BBC SPORT		Attendance: 2,909; Referee: Craig Thomson

5 March 2011 SPL	St Johnstone	1–1	Hibernian	McDiarmid Park
	Towell 46'	BBC SPORT	Wotherspoon 80'	Attendance: 4,446; Referee: Crawford Allan

19 March 2011 SPL	Hamilton Academical	0–0	St Johnstone	New Douglas Park
		STfc		Attendance: 2,111; Referee: Bobby Madden

2 April 2011 SPL	St Johnstone	0–0	Kilmarnock	McDiarmid Park
		BBC SPORT		Attendance: 3,083; Referee: Stephen Finnie

5 April 2011 SPL	St Johnstone	0–2	Rangers	McDiarmid Park
		BBC SPORT	Lafferty 20'; Naismith 83'	Attendance: 5,820; Referee: Crawford Allan

9 April 2011 SPL	Dundee United	2–0	St Johnstone	Tannadice
	Russell 45'; Robertson 85'	BBC SPORT	Anderson (yellow card) 15' (red card)	Attendance: 6,398; Referee: Mike Tumilty

12 April 2011 SPL	St Johnstone	0–1	Celtic	McDiarmid Park
		BBC SPORT	Kayal 45'	Attendance: 6,338; Referee: Iain Brines

25 April 2011 SPL	St Johnstone	0–3	Inverness CT	McDiarmid Park
		BBC SPORT	Innes 36'; Doran 57'; Foran 70'	Attendance: 2,395; Referee: Bobby Madden

30 April 2011 SPL	Hibernian	1–2	St Johnstone	Easter Road
	Sodje 23'	BBC SPORT	Craig 74'; Moon 90'	Attendance: 7,492; Referee: Crawford Allan

7 May 2011 SPL	Aberdeen	0–2	St Johnstone	Pittodrie
		BBC SPORT	Smith 8' (o.g.); Adams 60'	Attendance: 6,361; Referee: John McKendrick

10 May 2011 SPL	St Johnstone	1–0	Hamilton Academical	McDiarmid Park
	Craig 29 pen.'	BBC SPORT	McLaughlin (red card) 28'	Attendance: 2,253; Referee: Steve Conroy

14 May 2011 SPL	St Mirren	0–0	St Johnstone	St Mirren Park
		BBC SPORT		Attendance: 4,230; Referee: Calum Murray

=== Scottish League Cup ===
24 August 2010 Second round	St Johnstone	2–0	Morton	McDiarmid Park
	Dobie 22'; Davidson 80'	BBC Sport		Attendance: 1,530; Referee: Crawford Allan

21 September 2010 Third round	St Johnstone	3–0	Queen of the South	McDiarmid Park
	Morris 68'; Haber 72'; Millar 74'	BBC Sport		Attendance: 1,624; Referee: Alan Muir

27 October 2010 Quarter Final	St Johnstone	2–3	Celtic	McDiarmid Park
	Parkin 31'; Davidson 54'	BBC Sport	Stokes 8', 13'; McGinn 12'	Attendance: 5,151; Referee: Craig Thomson

=== Scottish Cup ===
11 January 2011 Fourth round	Heart of Midlothian	0–1	St Johnstone	Tynecastle Park
		BBC Sport	MacDonald 86'	Attendance: 6,261; Referee: Brines

9 February 2011 Fifth round	St Johnstone	2–0	Partick Thistle	McDiarmid Park
	Davidson 42'; Craig 57'	BBC Sport		Attendance: 2,441; Referee: Brines

12 March 2011 Quarter Final	Brechin City	2–2	St Johnstone	Glebe Park
	Millar 48'; Invincibile 62'	BBC Sport	McAllister 42 pen.', 78'	Attendance: 3,472; Referee: Conroy

22 March 2011 Quarter Final Replay	St Johnstone	1–0	Brechin City	McDiarmid Park
	Samuel 37'	BBC SPORT		Attendance: 3,891; Referee: Conroy

16 April 2011 Semi Final	Motherwell	3–0	St Johnstone	Hampden Park
	Craigan 5'; Murphy 14'; Sutton 39'	BBC SPORT		Attendance: 11,920; Referee: Brines

== Squad ==
Note: Flags indicate national team as defined under FIFA eligibility rules; some limited exceptions apply. Players may hold more than one non-FIFA nationality.

No.	Pos.	Nation	Player
1	GK	FIN	Peter Enckelman
2	DF	SCO	Dave Mackay (vice-captain)
3	DF	ENG	Danny Grainger
4	MF	ENG	Jody Morris (Club captain)
5	DF	SCO	Kevin Rutkiewicz (on loan to Dunfermline Athletic)
6	DF	ENG	Michael Duberry
7	MF	SCO	Chris Millar
8	MF	LTU	Arvydas Novikovas (on loan from Hearts)
9	FW	ENG	Sam Parkin
10	MF	SCO	Liam Craig
11	MF	JAM	Cleveland Taylor
12	DF	SCO	Steven Anderson
14	MF	SCO	Kevin Moon
15	GK	SCO	Graeme Smith
16	FW	SCO	Peter MacDonald

No.	Pos.	Nation	Player
17	DF	IRL	Graham Gartland
18	FW	SCO	Scott Dobie (on loan to Bradford City)
19	DF	IRL	Alan Maybury
20	MF	SCO	Murray Davidson
21	FW	TRI	Collin Samuel
22	FW	AUS	Danny Invincibile
23	FW	IRL	Andy Jackson
24	MF	SCO	Jamie Adams
26	FW	SCO	Stephen Reynolds
31	DF	SCO	Mark Durnan
32	FW	SCO	Stevie May
35	GK	SCO	Alexander Clark
36	MF	SCO	Ricky McIntosh
37	MF	SCO	Liam Caddis
45	GK	SCO	Neil Duffy

== Team statistics ==
=== League table ===
Pos	Team	Pld	W	D	L	GF	GA	GD	Pts
6	Motherwell	38	13	7	18	40	60	−20	46
7	Inverness Caledonian Thistle	38	14	11	13	52	44	+8	53
8	St Johnstone	38	11	11	16	23	43	−20	44
9	Aberdeen	38	11	5	22	39	59	−20	38
10	Hibernian	38	10	7	21	39	61	−22	37

Source: SPFL Archive
Rules for classification: 1) points; 2) goal difference; 3) number of goals scored.
