= Sandy McLaren =

Scottish footballer

Personal information
- Full name: Alexander McLaren
- Date of birth: 25 December 1910
- Place of birth: Tibbermore, Scotland
- Date of death: 5 February 1960 (aged 49)
- Place of death: Perth, Scotland
- Height: 6 ft 1 in (1.85 m)
- Position: Goalkeeper

Senior career*
Years	Team	Apps	(Gls)
1927–1933	St Johnstone	198	(0)
1933–1940	Leicester City	239	(0)
Total		437	(0)

International career
1929–1932	Scotland	5	(0)
- * Club domestic league appearances and goals

Alexander McLaren (25 December 1910 – 5 February 1960) was a Scottish footballer, who played as a goalkeeper.

Born in Tibbermore, Perthshire, McLaren played club football for St Johnstone in the Scottish Football League and Leicester City in The Football League.

He earned five caps for Scotland in 1929 and 1932, and remains St Johnstone's most capped player for Scotland, as well as the joint-first to debut (Willie Imrie played in the same match – they were the only serving players from the club to be selected until Murray Davidson in 2012). McLaren was one of only four 18-year-olds to play for Scotland during the 20th century, the others being Denis Law, Paul McStay and Willie Henderson. He remains the youngest goalkeeper to play for Scotland, as he made his debut aged 18 years and 152 days.
