= Chris Millar =

Scottish footballer (born 1983)

Personal information
- Full name: Christopher Alexander Millar
- Date of birth: 30 March 1983 (age 43)
- Place of birth: Glasgow, Scotland
- Position: Central midfielder

Team information
- Current team: Port Glasgow Juniors

Youth career
- –2003: Celtic

Senior career*
Years	Team	Apps	(Gls)
2003–2008	Greenock Morton	178	(29)
2008–2018	St Johnstone	273	(6)
2018–2021	Greenock Morton	53	(3)
2021–2022	East Kilbride	?	(?)
2022–2023	Kilwinning Rangers	17	(0)
2023	Troon	6	(0)
2023–2024	Troon		

Managerial career
- 2023: Clyde (interim)
- * Club domestic league appearances and goals as of 09:42, 31 May 2023 (UTC)

Christopher Alexander Millar (born 30 March 1983) is a Scottish professional football player and coach who plays for Port Glasgow Juniors.

Millar was in the Celtic youth system, then started his professional career with Greenock Morton. He then played for St Johnstone for ten seasons and went on to play regularly for the Saints in the top flight and helping them win the Scottish Cup in 2014. Millar returned to Morton in 2018.

== Club career ==
=== Greenock Morton ===
Born in Glasgow, Scotland, Millar began his football career at Celtic before he was released by the club in February 2003. Initially, he started out playing in the right–back position before switching to playing in the right–midfield position. Shortly after, Millar signed for then Scottish Football League Third Division side Greenock Morton, starting out his professional football career at the Ton. He made his Greenock Morton debut away at a goalless draw against Montrose on 25 February 2003. He was a member of the Ton’s 2002–03 Scottish Third Division championship-winning team that season. At the end of the 2002–03 season, Millar made thirteen appearances in all competitions.

In the 2003–04 season, Millar became a first team regular in his first full season at Greenock Morton and contributed to the club’s good start to the season that saw them top of the table. He then scored his first goal for Greenock Morton, in a 6–4 win against Arbroath on 6 December 2003. Millar added two more goals for the Ton later in the season, scoring against Stenhousemuir and Dumbarton. However, the club’s form soon dip in the second half of the season and ended up finishing the season in fourth place. At the end of the 2003–04 season, he made forty–two appearances and scoring four times in all competitions. Shortly after, Millwar signed a contract extension with Greenock Morton.

In the 2004–05 season, Millar scored an equalising goal, in a 1–1 draw against Stirling Albion on 11 September 2004. Two weeks later on 25 September 2004, he scored his second goal of the season, in a 6–1 win against Alloa Athletic, followed up by scoring against Forfar Athletic. After the match, Millar stated that his goals he scored was no fluke. Millar later scored more goals by the end of the year, coming against East Stirlingshire and Cove Rangers. In the second half of the season, he scored against Arbroath on two separate occasions and Alloa Athletic, again on two separate occasions. On the last game of the season against Stranraer, Millar started the match but he was unable to help Greenock Morton gain promotion to the First Division by a single point, finishing behind Stranraer in third place. At the end of the 2004–05 season, Millar made forty appearances and scoring thirteen times in all competitions.

At the start of the 2005–06 season, Millar scored his first goal of the season, in a 5–2 win against Alloa Athletic on 17 September 2005. He then scored his second goal of the season, in a 2–0 win against Raith Rovers on 26 December 2005. Millar scored three goals between 25 February 2006 and 11 March 2006 against Forfar Athletic and twice against Gretna. He helped Greenock Morton finish second place to qualify for the Scottish First Division play–offs. Millar played in both legs of the Scottish First Division play–offs against Peterhead, as the Ton loss 1–0 on aggregate. At the end of the 2005–06 season, he made forty–four appearances and scoring five times in all competitions.

Ahead of the 2006–07 season, teammate Derek Lilley praised Millar for maintaining his fitness, which contributed to him regaining his first team place for Greenock Morton. He went on a scoring spree, scoring five times for the Ton. Millar later scored two more goals by the end of the year, coming against Stirling Albion and Forfar Athletic (although he scored an own goal). On 2 January 2007, Millar scored his eighth goal of the season, in a 2–1 win against Peterhead. On 7 April 2007, he scored his ninth goal of the season, in a 9–1 win against Forfar Athletic. Having set his target to help Greenock Morton get promoted to the Scottish First Division, Millar’s target was fulfilled when the Ton’s promotion to the Scottish First Division was achieved on 14 April 2007. He said helping the club getting promoted to the Scottish Football Division was a best experience, alongside, winning the Player of the Year award. At the end of the 2006–07 season, Millar made forty–three appearances and scoring nine times in all competitions.

The start of the 2007–08 season saw Millar start in the first six matches for Greenock Morton. However, he suffered a hamstring injury that kept him out for a month. On 20 October 2007, Millar made his return from injury, coming on as a 65th-minute substitute, in a 1–0 win against Clyde. Three weeks later on 10 November 2007, he scored his first goal of the season, in a 3–1 win against Queen of the South. Millar then scored his second goal of the season, in a 2–2 draw against Livingston on 1 December 2007. However, following the announcement of Millar’s move to St Johnstone, he was dropped from the squad for four matches. But Millar returned to the starting line–up, in a 2–2 draw against Gretna in the fourth round of the Scottish FA Cup on 12 January 2008 to bring the match to a replay. In the fourth round replay of the Scottish FA Cup, he scored the third goal of the game, in a 3–0 win to help Greenock Morton advance to the next round. The Perth attempted to sign Millar on deadline day but it was unsuccessful. On 9 February 2008, Millar scored his fourth goal of the season, in a 2–1 loss against Clyde. In a follow–up match against Dundee, he received a red card for a second bookable offence in the 63rd minute, in a 2–0 loss. After serving a one match suspension, Millar returned to the starting line–up, in a 2–1 win against Stirling Albion on 1 March 2008. However, in a match against Partick Thistle on 15 March 2008, he suffered a groin injury and was substituted in the 57th minute. After missing one match, Millar returned to the starting line–up, in a 0–0 draw against Queen of the South on 29 March 2008. On the last game of the season against Dunfermline Athletic, he helped the club win 3–0 to avoid the relegation playoff by a single goal. At the end of the 2007–08 season, Millar made thirty–two appearances and scoring four times in all competitions. By the time he left Greenock Morton, Millar said he enjoyed every minute at the Tor.

=== St Johnstone ===
On 21 December 2007, it was announced that Millar had signed a pre-contract agreement with St Johnstone. Despite Greenock Morton’s attempts to keep him, he officially signed with the club on 1 May 2008. Upon joining the Saints, manager Derek McInnes said about Miller, who signed a two–year contract with the club: "he is a fit, driven, energetic individual whose attitude is exactly what I want around here. Although we had him on a pre-contract, Morton made Millar a fantastic offer to stay which is their right and he thinks that St Johnstone is the right club for him to develop further at."

In the opening game of the 2008–09 season, he made his debut for the Saints, starting the whole game, in a 2–0 win against Livingston. Since joining St Johnstone, he quickly became a first team regular for the club, playing in the midfield position. On 21 February 2009, Millar scored his first goal for St Johnstone, in a 3–3 draw against Queen of the South. After missing one match through suspension, he returned on 19 April 2009, coming on as a 61st-minute substitute, and scoring the second goal of the game, in a 3–2 loss against Queen of the South. Millar was part of the club’s promotion squad when the Saints secured promotion to the Scottish Premier League after beating his former club Greenock Morton 3–2 to end their seven-year stint in the First Division on 2 May 2009. At the end of the 2008–09 season, he made thirty–eight appearances and scoring two times in all competitions.

However, Millar missed the opening game of the 2009–10 season against Motherwell, due to a calf injury. But he returned to the starting line–up in a follow–up match against Celtic and set up St Johnstone’s second goal of the game, in a 5–2 loss. Millar continued to regain his first team place at the club, playing in the midfield position. He then scored his first goal of the season, in a 3–1 win against Hibernian in the last 16 of the Scottish League Cup. A week later on 3 October 2009, Millar set up the second goal of the game, in a 2–0 against Hamilton Academical. On 31 October 2009, he scored his second goal of the season, in a 3–1 win against Falkirk. In a match against St Mirren on 19 December 2009, Millar scored the only goal of the game, in a 1–0 win. Two days later, on 21 December 2009, he signed a contract with the Saints, keeping him until 2012. In a follow–up match against Motherwell, Millar played a role to the match when he set up two goals, in a 3–1 win. For his performance, he was named St Johnstone’s Player of the Month for January. On 30 March 2010, Millar scored his fourth goal of the season and set up the club’s third goal of the match, in a 4–1 win against Rangers. At the end of the 2009–10 season, he made forty–one appearances and scoring four times in all competitions.

The start of the 2010–11 season saw Millar start four league matches, playing in the midfield position, as St Johnstone made a poor start, losing three times. After missing one match, he scored on his return, in a 3–0 win against Queen of the South in the third round of the Scottish League Cup. However, his return was short–lived when Millar suffered an injury that saw him out for three matches. But he made his return to the starting line–up, in a 0–0 draw against Hibernian on 27 November 2010. In the fourth round of the Scottish Cup against Hearts on 11 January 2011, Millar set up the only goal of the game for Peter MacDonald, in a 1–0 win to help the Saints advance to the next round. However, he suffered a hamstring injury that kept him out for weeks. But on 12 March 2011, Millar returned to the starting line–up against Brechin City in the quarter-finals of the Scottish Cup and scored on his return, in a 2–2 draw to earn a replay. In a replay match, he set up a goal for Collin Samuel to score the only goal of the game, in a 1–0 to help the club advance to the next round. Despite missing another match, due to suffering a groin injury for the second time this season, Millar made thirty–seven appearances and scoring two times in all competitions.

At the start of the 2011–12 season, however, Millar suffered a groin injury during a practice match and was out for three weeks. But he made his return from injury against St Mirren on 10 September 2011, starting the whole game, in a 0–0 draw. Following this, Millar regained his first team place, playing in the midfield position. However, he suffered a hamstring tear that saw him out for the rest of January. But on 11 February 2012, Millar made his return to the starting line–up, in a 5–1 loss against Dundee United. In a match against Celtic on 1 April 2012, he scored an own goal, in a 2–0 loss. Following his return from injury, Millar was a regular in the first team until he missed two matches, due to an injury once again. In a match against Celtic on 4 May 2012, Millar made his return to the starting line–up, only for him to be substituted in the 42nd minute, due to a groin injury, as St Johnstone went on to lose 2–0. But he returned to the starting line–up, in a 2–0 loss against Hearts on 6 May 2012. His contributions saw the Saints qualify for a place in Europe despite finishing sixth place. At the end of the 2011–12 season, Millar went on to make thirty–three appearances in all competitions. His future at St Johnstone was uncertain when he turned down a new contract from the club, due to his pending move to Australia. But following talks with future manager Tommy Wright, Millar opted to stay at St Johnstone for another season.

At the start of the 2012–13 season, Millar played in both legs of the UEFA Europa League second qualifying round against Turkish side Eskişehirspor, as St Johnstone went on to lose 4–1 on aggregate and was eliminated in the tournament. In a match against Aberdeen on 18 August 2012, however, he suffered a hamstring injury and was substituted in the 31st minute, as the Saints loss 2–1. After missing two matches, Millar returned to the first team, coming on as a 22nd-minute substitute for Murray Davidson and helped the club beat Celtic 2–1 on 15 September 2012. Following his return from injury, he regained his first team place, playing in the midfield position. In a match against Kilmarnock on 24 November 2012, Millar set up a goal for Rowan Vine, who scored the winning goal for St Johnstone, in a 2–1 win. However, in a match against St Mirren on 8 December 2012, he received a red card for a second bookable offence, in a 1–1 draw. After serving a one match suspension, Miller returned to the starting line–up against Cowdenbeath in the fourth round of the Scottish Cup, as the Saints won 2–0. In a follow–up match against Aberdeen, however, he was substituted in the 29th minute with a groin injury, as the club loss 2–0. On 2 January 2013, Millar returned to the starting line–up, in a 1–0 win against Dundee. However, his return was short–lived once again when he suffered a groin injury that kept him out for weeks. On 27 February 2013, Millar returned to the starting line–up, in a 2–2 draw against Dundee. Following his return from injury, he, once again, regained his first team place for St Johnstone, playing in the midfield position. On 3 May 2013, Millar signed a two–year contract extension with the Saints. After missing one match, he returned to the starting line–up on the last game of the season against Motherwell and helped the Saints win 2–0 to seal third place finish in the league and qualify for Europe again. At the end of the 2012–13 season, Millar made thirty appearances in all competitions.

At the start of the 2013–14 season, Millar said St Johnstone must "strike the balance between not being over-cautious but not being over-cavalier and leaving ourselves exposed" prior to the UEFA Europa League second qualifying round against Rosenborg. He started the whole game and helped St Johnstone to a victory against Rosenborg in the first leg. However, during the match, Millar suffered a groin injury and was out for two weeks. But he made his return to the starting line–up, in a 1–0 win against Hearts in the opening game of the season. Four days later on 8 August 2013, Millar came on as a 67th-minute substitute in the second leg of the UEFA Europa League third qualifying round against Minsk, as the Saints was eliminated on penalties following a 1–1 draw. Following this, he continued to regain his first team place, playing in the midfield position. However, during a match against Hibernian on 21 December 2013, Millar suffered a groin injury once again and was substituted in the 37th minute, as the club drew 0–0. After missing two matches, he returned to the first team, coming on as a late substitute, in a 4–0 loss against Motherwell. He started the semi–finals of the Scottish Cup against Aberdeen on 13 April 2014 and helped St Johnstone win 2–1 to reach the Scottish Cup final. On 17 May 2014, Millar started in the Scottish Cup Final at Celtic Park against Dundee United and helped the Saints win 2–0 to win the trophy for the first time. National newspaper The Herald said about his performance, saying: "Typically busy display at the base of the club’s midfield." He later said winning the Scottish Cup was the best day of his career, having dreamed of winning the tournament as a kid. At the end of the 2013–14 season, he went on to make forty–one appearances in all competitions.

At the start of the 2014–15 season, Millar started in both legs of the UEFA Europa League second qualifying round against Luzern, as St Johnstone won 5–4 in the shootout to advance to the next round following a 2–2 draw on aggregate. However, he started in both legs of the UEFA Europa League second qualifying round against Spartak Trnava, as the Saints were eliminated from the Europa League. Millar contributed good performance in the first three league matches that saw him earn Man of the Match three times. Manager Tommy Wright praised his performance, saying: "He was head and shoulders above everyone else on the pitch. His energy and drive in breaking up the play and building for us was excellent. Midge was asked to do a role and he does it brilliantly. Millar doesn’t let people settle, he’s in around them and he forces people to make mistakes.“ However, prior to the match against Dundee United on 27 September 2014, Millar suffered a groin injury while warming up and missed three matches. On 25 October 2014, he returned to the starting line–up, in a 0–0 draw against Partick Thistle. Having suffered a goal drought for over three years, Millar scored the winning goal, in a 2–1 win against Dundee United on 27 December 2014. After the match, he was named Man of the Match on the club’s website. However, during a match against Partick Thistle, Millar suffered a knee injury and was substituted in the 24th minute, as St Johnstone won 2–0. On 29 January 2015, he signed a two-year contract extension with the Saints. Millar made his return from injury, starting the whole game, in a 2–1 loss against Celtic on 14 February 2015. Following his return from injury, he, once again, regained his first team place for the club, playing in the midfield position. Millar captained on his 200th appearance for St Johnstone, in a 0–0 draw against Celtic on 15 May 2015. On the last game of the season, he started the whole game and helped the Saints beat Aberdeen 1–0 to help the club qualify for the UEFA Europa League for the third year running. At the end of the 2014–15 season, Millar made thirty–nine appearances and scoring once in all competitions. For his performance, he won multiple awards, including Supporters' Player of the Year at St Johnstone’s award ceremony.

However, the start of the 2015–16 season, Millar missed out two Europa League matches, due to a hamstring injury. In the opening game of the 2015–16 season against Hearts, however, he captained St Johnstone and played 20 minutes before being substituted, due to a groin injury. After being out for two matches, Millar made his return to the starting line–up, in a 2–1 loss against Dundee on 15 August 2015. However, during a 2–1 win against Dundee United on 26 September 2015, he suffered a hamstring injury for the second time this season and was substituted in the 67th minute. After the match, he was out for a month with a hamstring injury. Millar returned on 21 November 2015 from his injury, starting the whole game, in a 2–1 win against Dundee United. However, his return was short–lived when he suffered a hamstring injury and was substituted in the 34th minute, as St Johnstone loss 3–0 against Celtic on 13 December 2015. But Millar made his return to the starting line–up, in a 2–0 loss against Motherwell on 30 December 2015. However, he suffered a thigh injury that saw him out for three matches in the beginning of 2016. Millar returned on 30 January 2016 from his injury, starting the whole game, in a 2–1 loss against Hibernian in the semi–finals of the Scottish Cup. However, in a match against Partick Thistle on 23 February 2016, he suffered a thigh injury and was substituted in the 34th minute, as the Saints loss 2–0. Millar made his return from injury, starting the whole game, in a 3–0 win against Hearts on 19 March 2016. Following his recovery, he determined not to get another injury again and wanted to finish the 2015–16 season on a high note. However, in a match against Ross County on 30 April 2016, Millar ended his 2015–16 season when he suffered a knee injury and was substituted in the 39th minute, as the club won 1–0. At the end of the 2015–16 season, Millar made twenty–three appearances in all competitions.

Ahead start of the 2016–17 season, Millar said he’s determined to put his injuries all behind him for the new season at St Johnstone. Millar appeared as the Saints’ captain in the first two matches of the group stage of the Scottish League Cup. However, he suffered a groin injury that saw him out for the opening game of the season. Millar returned to the starting line–up against Motherwell on 9 August 2016 and was involved in a build up that led to Steven MacLean scoring a winning goal, in a 2–1 win. His return was short–lived when he suffered a groin injury for the second time this season and was out for the rest of August. Millar didn’t make his return from injury against Partick Thistle on 10 September 2016, where he started the whole game, in a 2–0 win. However, his return was short–lived when he suffered a groin injury and didn’t play for a month. Following the retirement of Dave Mackay, Millar was appointed as the club’s manager, alongside Brian Easton. On 26 October 2016, he made his return to the starting line–up, in a 1–1 draw against Rangers. After the match, Millar said he was happy to make a return to the first team and reiterated putting his injuries all behind him. However, in a match against Hearts on 5 November 2016, Millar suffered a thigh injury in the 26th minute and was substituted, as St Johnstone drew 2–2. After the match, it was announced that he would be out for a month. Millar returned on 17 December 2016 from his injury, starting a match and played 70 minutes, in a 1–1 draw against Motherwell. Since the start of the 2016–17 season, Millar found himself placed on the substitute bench and fought for a place in the starting eleven despite facing injuries along the way. However in a match against Kilmarnock on 25 February 2017, he suffered a muscle injury and was substituted in the 59th minute, as the Saints loss 2–0. Millar returned on 1 April 2017 from his injury, coming on as a late substitute, in a 1–0 loss against Hamilton Academical. In a follow–up match against Hearts, he made his 300th appearance for the club, also coming on as a late substitute, in a 1–0 win. On 28 April 2017, Millar signed a one–year contract extension with St Johnstone. However, in a match against Aberdeen on 29 April 2017, he suffered a groin injury and was substituted in the 35th minute, as the Saints won 2–0. After being out for two matches, Millar returned to the starting line–up as captain in the remaining two matches of the season. His contributions at the club saw them qualify for the UEFA Europa League next season. At the end of the 2016–17 season, he made twenty–two appearances in all competitions.

Ahead of the 2017–18 season, Millar said St Johnstone should not underestimate FK Riteriai prior to the UEFA Europa League first qualifying round match. His words were proven correct when he started the match in the first leg, as the Saints loss 2–1 against FK Riteriai. After the match, Millar said the club must show combative performance in the return leg. In the return leg, he captained St Johnstone but wasn’t able to help the Saints overcome deficit, as the club loss 1–0 and was eliminated from the tournament. Following this, he suffered a muscle injury that saw him out at the start of the season. Millar was linked a move away from St Johnstone in the summer transfer window, but eventually, he ended up staying at the Saints. Millar made his first appearance for the club in two months, coming on as a late substitute, in a 2–1 win against Hamilton Academical on 23 September 2017. However, his return was short–lived when he was out for two months with two separate injuries. Prior to the match against Kilmarnock on 2 December 2017, Millar were "among four players held up by a road accident when an accident just in front of them, north of Dunblane at 12.25pm, led to the closure of the A9 for four hours". He returned on 16 December 2017 from his injury, starting the whole game, in a 3–1 win against Rangers. After the match, Millar said he was inspired by Cesc Fàbregas’s return, due to not playing as much as he was and worked hard in training, which he felt was paid off. His performance against Rangers convinced Tommy Wright to let him stay at St Johnstone. Throughout the 2017–18 season, Millar found his first team opportunities limited at St Johnstone under the management of Tommy Wright. On 3 May 2018, manager Tommy Wright said that Millar would be released at the end of the 2017–18 season. He made his last appearance for the club against Ross County on the last game of the season, as the match ended in a 1–1 draw. At the end of the 2017–18 season, Millar made nineteen appearances in all competitions.

Having completed 10 years of service, Millar was granted a testimonial by St Johnstone in 2018. He played in the testimonial match against Aberdeen on 8 July 2018, as the Saints drew 2–2.

=== Return to Greenock Morton ===
After leaving St Johnstone, Millar signed again with Morton on a one-year deal. He said rejoining the Ton was the right move to stay closer to home despite interests from Dundee United.

Millar made his second debut for the club, starting the match, in a 3–1 loss against Ayr United in the group stage of the Scottish League Cup. However, he suffered a hamstring injury that saw him out for one match. Millar made his return to the starting line–up, starting the whole game, in a 2–2 draw against Queen of the South in the opening game of the season. In a follow–up match, he scored his first goals in ten years for Greenock Morton, in a 2–0 win against Alloa Athletic on 11 August 2018. However, Millar suffered a groin injury that saw him out for one match. He made his return from injury, starting a match against Ayr United on 29 September 2018, only for him to be substituted in the 55th minute after suffering a groin injury once again. After being out for three weeks, Millar made his return from injury, starting the whole game, in a 1–0 win against Falkirk on 20 October 2018. However, in a follow–up match against Ross County, he suffered a groin injury once again and was substituted in the 72nd minute, as the Ton loss 5–0. Millar returned on 24 November 2018 from his injury, starting the whole game, in a 1–1 draw against Peterhead to earn a replay in the third round of the Scottish Cup. In a replay match, he scored the third goal of the game, in a 3–0 win to advance to the next round. Following his return from injury, Millar regained his first team place, playing in different midfield positions. He then scored his fourth goal for the Ton, in a 2–1 loss against Alloa Athletic on 12 January 2019. On 27th April 2019, Millar made his 250th appearance for the club, coming on as a 61st-minute substitute, in a 2–0 win against Dunfermline Athletic. At the end of the 2018–19 season, he went on to make thirty–six appearances and scoring four times in all competitions. On 27 May 2019, it was announced Millar had committed himself to Greenock Morton until 10 June 2020.

At the start of the 2019–20 season, Millar continued to be involved in the first team, playing in different midfield positions. However, he soon found himself place on the substitute bench under the new management of David Hopkin, as well as, his own injury concern. Despite this, Millar stated that he has ruled out retirement, aiming to play for another season at Greenock Morton. Millar also stated that he aimed to help the Ton to get 40 points as quickly as possible. However, the season was soon curtailed because of the COVID-19 pandemic, with the club only received 36 points. At the end of the 2019–20 season, Millar made twenty–three appearances in all competitions.

Ahead of the 2020–21 season, Millar signed a one–year contract extension with Greenock Morton. However, his playing time was significantly reduced throughout the season, due to a calf injury and balancing his role as a player coach and personal trainer. He returned on 2 January 2021 from his injury, coming on as a late substitute, in a 1–1 draw against Alloa Athletic. Millar spoke out that the league should be played to a finish. He then made his 275th appearance for the Ton, coming on as a 63rd minute substitute, in a 2–2 draw against Inverness Caledonian Thistle on 27 January 2021. On 11 May 2021, Millar made his last appearance for Greenock Morton, starting the whole game in a right–back position, in a 3–1 win against Montrose in the second leg of the play–offs that saw the Ton advance to the final. At the end of the 2020–21 season, he made four appearances in all competitions.

Following this, Millar was released by Greenock Morton after staying at the Tons for three years in his second spell. Upon leaving the club, he said it was a perfect send-off to leaving Greenock Morton following their promotion to the Scottish Championship.

=== East Kilbride ===
Millar signed with East Kilbride on 9 June 2021. He was named as club captain by ex-teammate Stephen Aitken.

Millar made his debut for East Kilbride, starting the whole game as captain, in a 3–0 loss against Kilmarnock in the group stage of the Scottish League Cup. He then scored his first goal for the club, in a 10–1 win against Coldstream in the first round of the Scottish Cup. Millar started as captain in the Lowland League Cup final, as East Kilbride beat Bo'ness United 4–2 to win the tournament. At the end of the 2021–22 season, he left the club after spending one season there. Millar said he ruled out retirement, determined to play one more season.

=== Kilwinning Rangers ===
After a season with East Kilbride, Millar moved to West of Scotland Football League side Kilwinning Rangers on a one-year deal. Upon joining the Buffs, he talked about playing football once he turns 40, describing as "a dream come true". Millar was given the vice–captain at Kilwinning Rangers.

He helped the Buff win the Eglinton Cup by beating Irvine Meadow XI 2–0. After one season at Kilwinning Rangers, Millar was released along with his namesake Mark Millar and five others.

=== Troon ===
Millar signed for Troon during the 2023 close season.

However, he missed the start of the season, due to an injury. Millar made his debut for the club, coming on as a late substitute, in a 5–1 loss against Largs Thistle on 5 August 2023. After leaving Troon, he made his six appearances for the club.

On 17 November 2023, Millar made his return to Troon. He came out of retirement from professional football and made his second debut for the club, in a 3–2 win against Thornton Hibs. A month later, on 16 December 2023, Millar scored his first goal for Troon, in a 4–3 win against Largs Thistle. However, he suffered a hamstring injury that kept him out for most of the 2023–24 season.

=== Port Glasgow Juniors ===
In July 2024, Millar joined Port Glasgow Juniors, where he was reunited with childhood pal Tam Jamieson.

Millar became a first team regular, playing in the midfield position and was a goal scorer throughout the 2024–25 season. In a match against St. Peter's F.C. on 11 February 2025, he received a red card for the first time in his career, in a 3–0 win. On 18 April 2025, Millar scored once again, in a 4–3 win against Knightswood to help the club promoted to West of Scotland Football League Third Division.

== Coaching career ==
Upon joining Greenock Morton in 2018, Millar was appointed as a youth coach for the Ton. Following the sacking of Jonatan Johansson, both he and Jim McAlister were appointed as the Ton’s caretaker manager on the last game of the season against Dundee United. Millar led as captain and caretaker to help Greenock Morton win 1–0. For the remainder of his time at the Ton, he started his player coach role.

On 14 September 2023, Millar left Troon to become assistant manager at Clyde Upon doing so, he announced his retirement from professional football. Millar became caretaker manager of the club after the departure of Brian McLean. His first match as a caretaker manager of Clyde took place on 30 October 2023 against Musselburgh Athletic in the second round of the Scottish Cup, as the club won 3–2. He was in charge for two more matches at Clyde before leaving the club on 16 November 2023 following the appointment of Ian McCall.

== Personal life ==
In his early Greenock Morton’s career, Millar ran the youth training with teammate Peter Weatherson. He also began to take up journalism course at University of Staffordshire. This led to him to begin working as a columnist for local newspaper, The Greenock Telegraph, writing his first column on 19 July 2013. Millar spoke out his opinions relating to football matters.

Millar is married to Danielle, and together they have two daughters, one was born in 2007 and the second one was born in September 2011. His wife opened a business in Port Glasgow, which was a factor him to re–join Greenock Morton.

Miller grew up in Morton with his four brothers. His older brother, Brian, currently works as a Physical Education at Park Mains High School. He attended St Stephen's High School. Due to his ties at Greenock Morton, Millar owns a house, which is five minutes from Cappielow. Miller is the brother-in-law of footballer Mark Millar. In 2022, Millar opened a new gym called Fitness Factory Gym in his hometown, alongside Gary Pettigrew, having planned this to open it for two years. He also became a certified personal trainer. In June 2025, Millar represented Scotland as part of a group of fitness fanatics taking part in the HYROX World Championships.

Outside of football, Millar’s hobbies includes singing karaoke. In May 2020, he volunteered in the local community as part of the coronavirus community relief effort.

== Career statistics ==
=== Player ===
As of match played 6 February 2021

Appearances and goals by club, season and competition
Club	Season	League			Scottish Cup		League Cup		Other		Total	
Club	Season	Division	Apps	Goals	Apps	Goals	Apps	Goals	Apps	Goals	Apps	Goals
Greenock Morton	2002–03	Scottish Third Division	13	0	0	0	0	0	0	0	13	0
Greenock Morton	2003–04	Scottish Second Division	36	3	2	1	2	0	2 (Note: Appearances in the Scottish Challenge Cup)	0	42	4
Greenock Morton	2004–05	Scottish Second Division	34	10	3 (Note: Includes two appearances not recorded on Soccerbase. "Morton 3-1 East Stirlingshire". BBC Sport. 23 November 2004. & "Cove Rangers 1-7 Morton". BBC Sport. 11 December 2004.)	3	2	0	1	0	40	13
Greenock Morton	2005–06	Scottish Second Division	35	5	2	0	1	0	6 (Note: Four appearances in the Scottish Challenge Cup and two in the First Division play-offs)	0	44	5
Greenock Morton	2006–07	Scottish Second Division	35	8	3	1	1	0	4	1	43	9
Greenock Morton	2007–08	Scottish First Division	25	3	4	1	1	0	2	0	32	4
Greenock Morton	Total		178	29	14	5	7	0	15	1	214	35
St Johnstone	2008–09	Scottish First Division	34	2	1	0	2	0	1 (Note: Includes one Challenge Cup appearance not recorded on Soccerbase. "Ross County 2-1 St Johnstone". BBC Sport. 26 July 2008.)	0	38	2
St Johnstone	2009–10	Scottish Premier League	36	3	2	0	3	1	—		41	4
St Johnstone	2010–11	Scottish Premier League	30	0	4	1	3	0	—		37	1
St Johnstone	2011–12	Scottish Premier League	30	0	2	0	1	0	—		33	0
St Johnstone	2012–13	Scottish Premier League	26	0	1	0	1	0	2 (Note: Appearances in the UEFA Europa League)	0	30	0
St Johnstone	2013–14	Scottish Premiership	32	0	4	0	3	0	2	0	41	0
St Johnstone	2014–15	Scottish Premiership	32	1	1	0	2	0	4	0	39	1
St Johnstone	2015–16	Scottish Premiership	20	0	1	0	2	0	0	0	23	0
St Johnstone	2016–17	Scottish Premiership	17	0	2	0	3	0	—		22	0
St Johnstone	2017–18	Scottish Premiership	16	0	1	0	0	0	2	0	19	0
St Johnstone	Total		273	6	19	1	20	1	11	0	323	8
Greenock Morton	2018–19	Scottish Championship	30	3	3	1	3	0	0	0	36	4
Greenock Morton	2019–20	Scottish Championship	19	0	2	0	2	0	0	0	23	0
Greenock Morton	2020–21	Scottish Championship	4	0	0	0	0	0	—		4	0
Greenock Morton	Total		53	3	5	1	5	0	0	0	63	4
Career total			504	38	38	7	32	1	26	1	600	47

=== Managerial record ===
As of match played 11 November 2023

Team	From	To	Record				
Team	From	To	G	W	D	L	Win %
Clyde (interim)	22 October 2023	15 November 2023	3	1	1	1	33.33
Total			3	1	1	1	33.33

== Honours ==
St Johnstone

- First Division: 2008–09
- Scottish Cup: 2013–2014

Greenock Morton

- Second Division: 2006–07
- Third Division: 2002–03

East Kilbride

- Lowland League Cup: 2022

Kilwinning Rangers

- Eglinton Cup: 2022

Port Glasgow Juniors

- West of Scotland Football League Third Division: 2024–25
