= Aaron Comrie =

Scottish footballer (born 1997)

Personal information
- Date of birth: 3 February 1997 (age 29)
- Position: Right-back

Team information
- Current team: Hamilton Academical
- Number: 2

Youth career
- 2006–2015: Celtic

Senior career*
Years	Team	Apps	(Gls)
2015–2019	St Johnstone	14	(0)
2015–2016	→ Montrose (loan)	21	(1)
2017	→ Peterhead (loan)	16	(0)
2019–2025	Dunfermline Athletic	166	(5)
2025–2026	Greenock Morton	27	(1)
2026–	Hamilton Academical	0	(0)
- * Club domestic league appearances and goals as of 4 May 2026

Aaron Comrie (born 3 February 1997) is a Scottish professional footballer who plays for as a right-back for Hamilton Academical.

Comrie previously played for St Johnstone and Dunfermline Athletic, and had loan spells with Montrose and Peterhead.

== Career ==
Comrie began his career in the youth setup at Celtic joining aged nine, making his way up to under-17 level at which point he was released.

Following his release by Celtic, Comrie signed for St Johnstone in February 2015.

In December 2015, Comrie moved on loan to Montrose initially for one month, then the deal was extended for the remainder of the season.

On 25 August 2016, Comrie made his debut for St Johnstone, coming on as a substitute in the first minute following an injury to Richard Foster away to Hamilton Academical, earning praise afterwards from manager Tommy Wright.

In January 2017, Comrie along with St Johnstone teammate Liam Gordon joined Peterhead on loan until the end of the season.

After returning to St Johnstone, Comrie made his first start for the club, in a 1–1 draw away to Celtic on 26 August 2017, where he was involved in an early collision with his teammate Murray Davidson, which left Comrie with a cut and forced Davidson off with concussion.

At the end of the 2018–19 season, Comrie was released by St Johnstone.

On 15 May 2019, Comrie signed for Scottish Championship club Dunfermline Athletic on a one-year contract with the option of a second. A mainstay of the first team since arriving, by the start of the 2024-25 season Comrie was the longest serving player in the Dunfermline squad having made 169 appearances in four seasons. He made over 200 appearances before being released in May 2025.

Comrie signed for Hamilton Academical in June 2026.

== Career statistics ==
As of 7 May 2025

Appearances and goals by club, season and competition
Club	Season	League			Scottish Cup		League Cup		Other		Total	
Club	Season	Division	Apps	Goals	Apps	Goals	Apps	Goals	Apps	Goals	Apps	Goals
St Johnstone	2015–16	Scottish Premiership	0	0	0	0	0	0	0	0	0	0
St Johnstone	2016–17	Scottish Premiership	1	0	0	0	0	0	1 (Note: Appearance(s) in the Scottish Challenge Cup)	0	2	0
St Johnstone	2017–18	Scottish Premiership	12	0	1	0	0	0	0	0	13	0
St Johnstone	2018–19	Scottish Premiership	1	0	0	0	0	0	0	0	1	0
St Johnstone	Total		14	0	1	0	0	0	1	0	16	0
Montrose (loan)	2015–16	Scottish League Two	21	1	0	0	0	0	0	0	21	1
Peterhead (loan)	2016–17	Scottish League One	16	0	0	0	0	0	0	0	16	0
Dunfermline Athletic	2019–20	Scottish Championship	27	0	1	0	5	1	1	0	34	1
Dunfermline Athletic	2020–21	Scottish Championship	22	1	1	0	4	0	2 (Note: Appearances in the play-offs)	0	29	1
Dunfermline Athletic	2021–22	Scottish Championship	30	1	1	0	5	1	2	0	38	2
Dunfermline Athletic	2022-23	Scottish League One	35	1	3	0	4	0	0	0	42	1
Dunfermline Athletic	2023-24	Scottish Championship	20	0	1	0	4	0	1	0	26	0
Dunfermline Athletic	2024-25	Scottish Championship	32	2	3	0	4	0	4	1	43	3
Dunfermline Athletic	Total		166	5	10	0	26	2	10	1	212	8
Career total			217	6	11	0	26	2	10	1	265	9

== Honours ==
Dunfermline Athletic

- Scottish League One: 2022–23
