= Steven MacLean (footballer) =

Scottish football manager (born 1982)

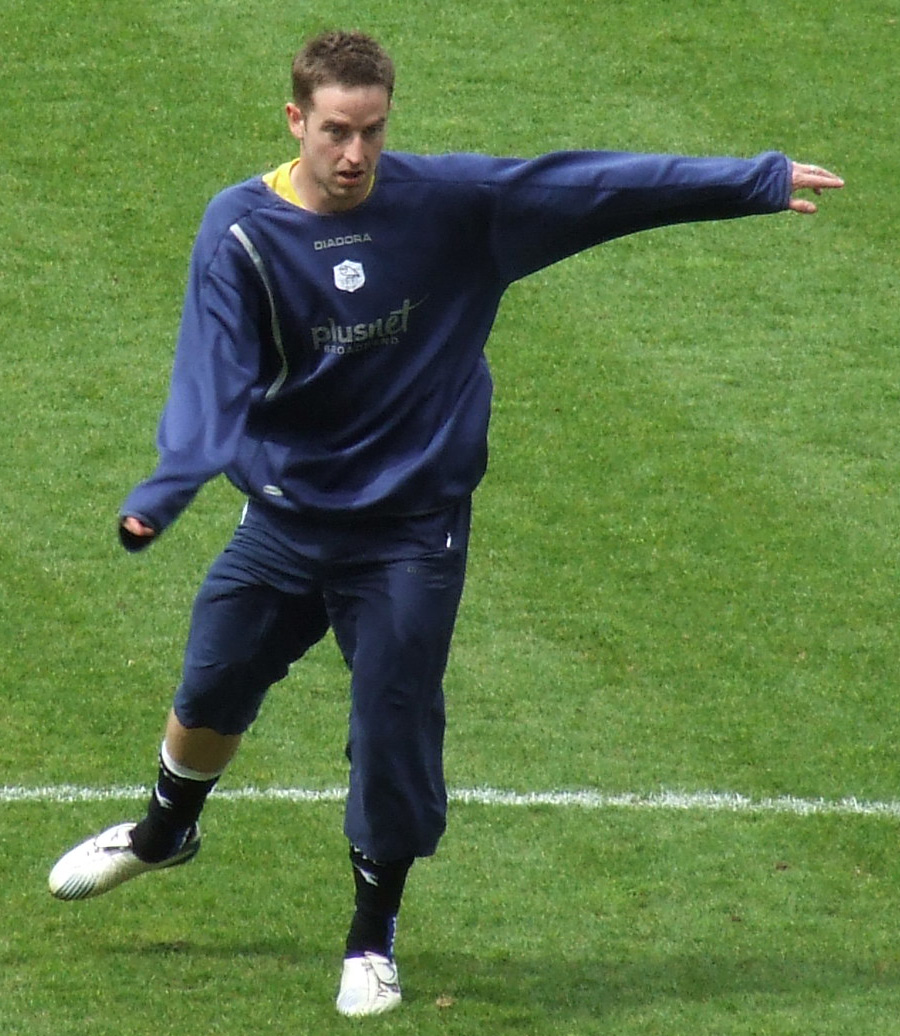
- MacLean as a Sheffield Wednesday player in 2007

Personal information
- Full name: Steven George MacLean
- Date of birth: 23 August 1982 (age 44)
- Place of birth: Edinburgh, Scotland
- Height: 5 ft 11 in (1.80 m)
- Position: Forward

Senior career*
Years	Team	Apps	(Gls)
2002–2004	Rangers	3	(0)
2003–2004	→ Scunthorpe United (loan)	42	(23)
2004–2007	Sheffield Wednesday	83	(32)
2007–2008	Cardiff City	15	(1)
2008–2011	Plymouth Argyle	48	(5)
2010	→ Aberdeen (loan)	16	(5)
2010–2011	→ Oxford United (loan)	31	(6)
2011–2012	Yeovil Town	20	(3)
2012	→ Cheltenham Town (loan)	3	(1)
2012–2018	St Johnstone	171	(47)
2018–2020	Heart of Midlothian	35	(4)
2020	→ Raith Rovers (loan)	6	(2)
Total		473	(129)

International career
2002	Scotland U21	4	(0)

Managerial career
- 2023: St Johnstone
- 2025: Queen's Park (interim)
- * Club domestic league appearances and goals

Steven George MacLean (born 23 August 1982) is a Scottish professional football coach and former player who was most recently the interim head coach of Scottish Championship club Queen's Park.

MacLean played as a forward for Rangers, Scunthorpe United, Sheffield Wednesday, Cardiff City, Plymouth Argyle, Aberdeen, Oxford United, Yeovil Town, Cheltenham Town, St Johnstone, Heart of Midlothian and Raith Rovers. He also represented the Scotland national under-21 football team.

MacLean retired from playing in 2020 and became a coach with St Johnstone. He was their manager for six months during 2023.

== Club career ==
=== Rangers ===
Born in Edinburgh, Scotland, MacLean started out his football career at Lothian Thistle Hutchison Vale, where he spent six years at the academy. When MacLean was a teenager, he was given a choice to join either Manchester City and Rangers, but chose the latter. MacLean progressed through the academy.

In the 2002–03 season, MacLean was called up to the Rangers first team and made his professional football debut, coming on as a 66th-minute substitute, in a 2–1 win against Partick Thistle on 22 December 2002. He made three more appearances for the club, all of them were coming on from the substitute bench. MacLean appeared as an unused substitute in the Scottish Cup final, as Rangers won 1–0 against Dundee to win the tournament. Despite receiving a medal, he felt like a fraud for not playing in the final. On 24 December 2003, MacLean signed a one-year contract extension with Rangers.

Upon returning to his parent club, however, Rangers manager Alex McLeish deemed that he was not "a first team prospect" and placed him on the transfer list. MacLean previously stated that he would leave Rangers if there’s no first team place for him next season.

==== Scunthorpe United (loan) ====
Ahead of the 2003–04 season, MacLean was linked with a move to England, with clubs, such as, Barnsley and Scunthorpe United all interested in signing him. In the end, he joined Third Division outfit Scunthorpe United.

MacLean made his debut for the Irons, coming on as a 72nd-minute substitute, in a 2–1 loss against Bristol Rovers in the opening game of the season. On 30 August 2003, he scored his first goal for Scunthorpe United, in a 2–1 win against Torquay United. MacLean’s goalscoring form began to improve when he scored seven goals throughout September, including a hat–trick against Cheltenham Town on 30 September 2003. MacLean quickly became a first team regular at the Irons that saw him linked with other English clubs, but he ended up staying at the club for the rest of the 2003–04 season. By the end of 2003, MacLean scored nine more goals, including two hat–tricks against Huddersfield Town and Cambridge United.

However, he suffered a four months goal drought and had to wait until on 6 March 2004 to score goal again with a brace, in a 3–0 win against Yeovil Town. This was followed up by scoring on 9 March 2004 and 13 March 2004 against York City and Hull City respectively. MacLean later scored four more goals for Scunthorpe United later in the 2003–04 season. In the last game of the season, he started the match, in a 1–0 loss against Darlington, as the Irons avoided relegation. At the end of the 2003–04 season, MacLean went on to make fifty–two appearances and scoring twenty–five times while on loan spell at the club.

This earned him a nomination for Division Three’s Player of the Year. He also won Scunthorpe United’s Player of the Year for his performance.

=== Sheffield Wednesday ===
On 7 July 2004, MacLean joined Football League One club Sheffield Wednesday for an undisclosed fee, believed to be around £125,000, and signed a three-year deal. He previously agreed to a move to Bristol City before joining the Owls.

MacLean made his debut for the Owls, starting the whole game, in a 3–0 loss against Colchester United in the opening game of the season. A week later on 14 August 2004, he scored his first goal for the club, in a 4–2 win against Torquay United. This was followed up by scoring two goals by the end of August against Huddersfield Town and Tranmere Rovers. Since joining Sheffield Wednesday, he quickly made an impact for the Owls, just as his former Scunthorpe United manager Brian Laws predicted. By the end of November, MacLean added five more goals for the club. He scored on 11 December 2004, 18 December 2004 and 26 December 2004 against Brentford, Doncaster Rovers (scoring a hat-trick that saw him achieved Sheffield Wednesday's first away hat-trick for 32 years) and Walsall. The first two months of 2005 saw MacLean add six more goals for the Owls. However, he suffered a foot injury and was substituted in the 62nd minute, as the club won 2–0 against Doncaster Rovers on 6 March 2005. After a scan, it was announced that MacLean would be out for the rest of the 2004–05 season. In the League 1 Play-off Final against Hartlepool United, he returned from his injury, coming on as a 77th-minute substitute, and scored a crucial penalty under pressure to level the scores at 2–2 and played the rest of the game, as Sheffield Wednesday on to defeat their opponents after extra time to send the Owls promoted to the Championship. MacLean said the club’s promotion was one of his best career there. In his first season, he made forty–one appearances and scoring twenty goals in all competitions, becoming the first Sheffield Wednesday player to hit the 20 goal mark in one season since Mark Bright in 1994. For his performance, MacLean was named the Owls’ Player of the Year.

However, at the start of the 2005–06 season, MacLean sustained a broken leg on the eve of the club's Championship campaign in August 2005. After being out for the rest of 2005, he didn’t make his return in the latter part of the season on 11 February 2006 against Crystal Palace. Following his return from his injury, MacLean returned to score two penalties for Sheffield Wednesday, first at home to rival club Sheffield United in a 2–1 defeat and then against league champions Reading, which earned the Owls a 1–1 draw. At the end of the 2005–06 season, he went on to make six appearances and scoring two times in all competitions.

However, at the start of the 2006–07 season, MacLean sustained another injury setback on 12 August 2006 after scoring in a 1–1 draw against Burnley. After the match, it was announced that he would be out for four weeks. But on 23 September 2006, MacLean made a comeback, coming on as a 62nd-minute substitute, in a defeat to Derby County. He later added five more goals by the end of the year. In a FA Cup match against Manchester City on 2 January 2007, MacLean scored an equalising goal, just minute after the opposition team took the lead, in a 1–1 draw to earn a replay. He later scored six more goals, including scoring the winning goals against Southend United and Coventry City. MacLean finished the 2006–07 season with 13 goals from 22 first team starts and 22 substitute appearances, making him the club's joint top goal scorer for the season with Deon Burton and showing signs of returning to the form in which he played with in the 2004–05 season.

=== Cardiff City ===
On 22 June 2007, it was announced that MacLean had signed for Sheffield Wednesday's Championship rivals Cardiff City, after failing to agree a new contract at Hillsborough. The move was a surprise to many Owls fans as MacLean was rumoured to have declared his willingness and desire to remain at the club. Speculation arose during the prolonged contract-talks with Wednesday that MacLean was demanding a significant pay-rise from that of his previous contract. It is possible that another stumbling block which prevented Sheffield Wednesday renewing MacLean's contract, was a clause in his contract which would grant former club Rangers £50,000 if he re-signed.

MacLean began the season as Cardiff's leading striker after Robbie Fowler was deemed not fit enough to play in some of the team's opening games. Famous for having never missed a penalty in his career, he came to Cardiff to miss one on his debut, leaving his new club to lose 1–0 to Stoke City in the first game of the season. He scored his first goal for the Bluebirds in the next game away to Queens Park Rangers, as Cardiff won 2–0. However, with Fowler soon returning and the arrival of Jimmy Floyd Hasselbaink, MacLean found himself relegated to the bench. Things continued to get worse for him as he suffered ruptured ankle ligaments in a reserve match against Plymouth Argyle, which was expected to rule him out until December. However, he made an early return coming on as a substitute in a 1–0 loss to Southampton on 21 October 2007. After his return, he made mostly late substitute appearances, with just three starts for Cardiff City – in a 2–0 defeat against Charlton Athletic, a 2–2 draw with Watford, and a 3–1 win against Chasetown in the FA Cup.

=== Plymouth Argyle ===
After finding himself out of favour at Cardiff City, MacLean signed a three-and-a-half-year deal with Plymouth Argyle on 18 January 2008, reuniting with former Sheffield Wednesday manager Paul Sturrock. The fee of £500,000 was a record signing for the Pilgrims.

He made his debut for the club the next day, starting the whole game, in a 1–1 draw against Southampton. Three weeks later on 12 February 2008, MacLean scored his first Plymouth Argyle goal in the sixth minute against Barnsley in a 3–0 win at Home Park. A month later, he scored two more goals for the club, coming against Colchester United and Coventry City. After the match, MacLean reflected on his target, saying: "If I score, I score; if I don't, I don't - I'll not beat myself up. I want to score goals but, at the end of the day, if I can contribute and develop the team in other ways, and we can win games...at the end of the day, it's all about the team." At the end of the 2007–08 season, he went on to make seventeen appearances and scoring three times in all competitions.

At the start of the 2008–09 season, MacLean soon lose his place in the first team, with Paul Gallagher and Rory Fallon preferred as Plymouth Argyle’s first choice forwards. But on 25 October 2008, he made his first return to the first team, coming on as a 71st-minute substitute, in a 3–1 loss against Ipswich Town. This was followed up by scoring his first goal of the season, in a 1–0 win against his former club, Sheffield Wednesday. On 13 December 2008, MacLean scored his second goal of the season, in a 1–1 draw against Queens Park Rangers. However, he failed to get into the team and an attitude problem combined with a lack of goals angered the fans.

At the start of the 2009–10 season, MacLean was recalled to Plymouth Argyle’s first team and appeared four times for the Pilgrims, but he continued to fail to score goals. In October 2009, Maclean was informed by Plymouth manager Sturrock that he was free to look for a new club.

Ahead of the 2010–11 season, MacLean was called up to the first team under the new management of Peter Reid. In the opening game of the 2010–11 season, he made his first league appearance for Plymouth Argyle in almost a year and set up a goal for Luke Summerfield, in a 1–0 win against Southampton. On 5 October 2010, MacLean scored his first goal of the season, in a 2–0 win against Cheltenham Town in the EFL Trophy. However, he, once again, fell out of favour in the first team. At the end of the season, MacLean made nine appearances and scoring once in all competitions. Following this, he was released by Plymouth Argyle.

==== Aberdeen (loan) ====
In the summer of 2009, MacLean was linked with a move return to Scotland, with Aberdeen interested in signing him, but the move never happened. On 28 December 2009, he joined Scottish Premier League side Hearts on trial. However, MacLean swiftly left again as Vladimir Romanov refused to finance a move. After a month of speculation, MacLean finally signed for Aberdeen on loan until the end of the 2009–10 season on 1 February 2010, alongside Jim Paterson.

He made his debut for the Dons, starting the whole game, in a 1–0 loss against Falkirk the next day. Maclean scored on 10 February 2010 and 13 February 2010 against Hibernian and Celtic respectively. In a match against St Mirren on 27 March 2010, he received a red card for a second bookable offence, in a 2–1 win. After serving a one match ban, MacLean returned to the starting line–up against Rangers and set up a goal, in a 2–1 loss on 7 April 2010. He then scored on 17 April 2010 and 24 April 2010 against Falkirk and St Johnstone respectively. By the time his loan at Aberdeen had finished, he had made eighteen appearances and scoring five goals in all competitions.

==== Oxford United (loan) ====
On 11 November 2010, MacLean signed for League Two side Oxford United on loan.

He made his 'The U's' debut, starting the whole game, in a 2–1 loss against Rotherham United on 13 November 2010. After the match, manager Chris Wilder praised his performance for "holding the ball up well and brought others into play." A week later, on 23 November 2010, MacLean scored his first goal for the club, in a 2–1 win against league leaders at the time Chesterfield. After the match, manager Wilder, once again, praised his performance for earning himself a goal and being a goal threat throughout the match. A week later on 2 December 2010, he extended his loan spell with Oxford United for another month. Since joining 'The U's', MacLean became a first team regular, becoming 'The U's' main striker.

On 15 January 2011, he scored the equalising goal and set up the winning goal for Tom Craddock, in a 2–1 win against Bradford City. Four days later, on 19 January 2011, MacLean signed an extension to his current loan deal to play for 'The U's' for the rest of the season, due to his performance at the club. On 12 February 2011, he then scored the winning goal from a penalty spot, in a 2–1 win against Rotherham United. Three weeks later, on 1 March 2011, MacLean scored his fourth goal for Oxford United, in a 3–1 loss against Lincoln City. During the same month, he scored twice for 'The U's', in a 3–0 win against Burton Albion. At the end of the 2010–11 season, MacLean made 31 appearances and scoring 6 goals in all competitions. After finished his spell at the club, Oxford United were keen on signing him despite stating earlier in the season that they couldn’t be able to sign permanently, due to his wages.

=== Yeovil Town ===
MacLean sought out other clubs and went on trial with League One side Yeovil Town in July 2011. On 26 July 2011, he officially joined the Glovers on a one-year deal.

On Yeovil Town's first match for the 2011–12 season, MacLean made his debut for the club in a 2–0 loss against Brentford, but he also received a yellow card in the third minute. A month later, on 9 September 2011, he scored his first goals for Yeovil Town in a 4–3 loss against Preston North End. A month later, on 3 October 2011, MacLean scored again and setting up the late goal consolation for Max Ehmer, in a 3–2 loss against AFC Bournemouth in the EFL Trophy. After missing three matches in late–October, he made his return as a late substitute, in a 2–2 draw against Exeter City on 19 November 2011.

On 21 January 2012, MacLean scored his fourth goal for the club, in a 3–2 defeat away to Bury. However, he made a gesture towards new manager Gary Johnson. The incident was subject to an internal enquiry by Yeovil Town and could have led to MacLean's contract being terminated, but two days late Johnson said that he was satisfied the gesture was just an "over-exuberant" celebration. By the time MacLean was loaned out to Cheltenham Town, he made twenty–four appearances and scoring four times in all competitions. At the end of the 2011–12 season, MacLean was released by the Glovers.

==== Cheltenham Town (loan) ====
After Yeovil's game against Carlisle United, Johnson explained that he had received an approach from Robins manager Mark Yates, and with MacLean struggling to get minutes on the pitch at present, the Glovers boss told BBC Somerset that he could see it as suiting all parties. On 22 March 2012, it was confirmed that MacLean had completed a loan move to Cheltenham Town until the end of the season, which local newspaper Oxford Mail published an article a year prior "that the player has been a nemesis to them in the past", including scoring a hat–trick against them.

He made his debut for the Robins, starting a match and playing 68 minutes before being substituted, in a 0–0 draw against Oxford United on 24 March 2012. He scored his first and only goal for Cheltenham Town in a 2–1 win at former club Plymouth Argyle on 5 May 2012. At the end of the 2011–12 season, MacLean made three appearances and scoring once in all competitions.

=== St Johnstone ===
MacLean signed a short-term contract with Scottish Premier League club St Johnstone on 1 September 2012.

==== 2012–13 season ====
He made his debut for the Saints, coming on as a late substitute in a 2–1 win over Celtic on 15 September 2012. Ten days later on 25 September 2012, MacLean scored his first goals for the club with a brace, in a 4–1 win against Queen's Park in the Scottish League Cup in the last 16 of the Scottish League Cup. Four days later on 29 September 2012, he scored his first league goal for St Johnstone, in a 3–1 win over Dundee. However, during the match, MacLean suffered a dislocated elbow and was substituted in the 83rd minute. After the match, he had a scan and was expected to be out of action for about six weeks.

But in late–October, Maclean made a speedy recovery, which he credited the St Johnstone’s physios and doctors for their part to his recovery. He made his return to the first team return, coming on as a 65th-minute substitute, in a 1–1 draw against Inverness Caledonian Thistle on 27 October 2012. MacLean later described the injury as "the most painful" of his football career. Following his return from his injury, he regained his first team place, forming a striking partnership with Grégory Tadé and Rowan Vine, though his goalscoring form dropped, as he was used in more of a supporting role. On 19 November 2012, MacLean signed a contract extension with the Saints, keeping him until the end of 2013–14 season.

He ended a run of seven games without scoring in a 2–2 draw against Hearts on 15 December 2012. This was followed up by scoring in a 3–0 win against Cowdenbeath in the fourth round of the Scottish Cup. MacLean assisted on 20 January 2013, 2 February 2013 and 11 February 2013 against Motherwell, Aberdeen and Hibernian respectively. Manager Steve Lomas praised his performance, saying: "MacLean has been excellent he’s probably sacrificed his game at times and he would probably have more goals if he didn’t do the work that he has to do."

On 27 February 2013, MacLean scored his sixth goal of the season, in a 2–2 draw against Dundee. He then scored on 21 April 2013 and 27 April 2013 against Ross County and Inverness Caledonian Thistle respectively. In his last game for St. Johnstone, MacLean started the whole game against Motherwell and helped the club win 2–0 to seal third place finish in the league and qualify for Europe again. At the end of the 2012–13 season, he went on to make thirty–eight appearances and scoring eight times in all competitions, making a joint top–scorer with Murray Davidson and Liam Craig. Following this, MacLean was awarded Auchterarder Supporters Club Player of the Year at St Johnstone’s award ceremony.

==== 2013–14 season ====
In the 2013–14 season, MacLean played in both legs, winning 2–1 on aggregate against Norwegian side Rosenberg in the UEFA Europa League second qualifying round. In the first leg of the UEFA Europa League third qualifying round tie, he scored his first European goal, in a 1–0 win over Belarus side Minsk. However, in the return leg, MacLean started the match, but Minsk equalised, leading to extra time and penalty shoot-out, which was one of the three players to fail convert the shootout, as the club were eliminated from the tournament. After the match, MacLean quoted "I tried to go for power [with my penalty] but the keeper has guessed right."

Following the Saints’ elimination, MacLean became the club’s first choice striker, forming a partnership with Stevie May and Nigel Hasselbaink. He played a role of setting up two goals for May against Hearts and Ross County in the first three league matches. MacLean scored on 28 September 2013, 5 October 2013 and 19 October 2013 against Partick Thistle, Inverness Caledonian Thistle (twice) and St Mirren respectively. However, during a match against St Mirren on 19 October 2013, he suffered a knee injury and had to be substituted in the 86th minute. After an operation on his knee, it was announced that MacLean would be expected to be out for three months.

After four months out, MacLean made his return, starting a match for St Johnstone, scoring twice in a 3–0 win over Motherwell on 25 February 2014. However, his return was short–lived when he received a red card for a second bookable offence, in a 1–0 loss against Aberdeen on 1 March 2014. After serving a one match suspension, MacLean returned to the starting line–up, in a 1–0 loss against Ross County on 15 March 2014. This was followed up by scoring in the next two matches against Hibernian and St. Mirren. Following his return from his injury, he remained in the first team for the remainder of the season despite manager Tommy Wright’s cautious views on starting him over his recovery. In the semi–finals of the Scottish Cup, MacLean set up a goal for May to score the winning goal, as the Saints won 2–1 to reach their first Scottish Cup Final. On 9 May 2014, he signed a contract extension with the club to keep him for the next two years.

In the Scottish Cup Final, MacLean started in the match, alongside his striking partner, Stevie May against Dundee United and with St Johnstone leading 1–0 just ten minutes to go, MacLean scored the second goal in the final after "he slid in to challenge Cierzniak before turning the ball over the line while grounded", causing him to celebrate by taking off his shirt off and was booked, as the Saints won the tournament for the first time in their history. After the match, MacLean spoke that the scoring the goal was an incredible feeling and had no regrets of removing his shirt, insisting it was worth it. National newspaper The Herald said about his performance, saying: "Played some good first-time lay-offs in the early stages and took his one chance well to clinch a 2-0 win after some alert forward play." At the end of the 2013–14 season, he went on to make twenty–nine appearances and scoring ten times in all competitions.

==== 2014–15 season ====
In St Johnstone’s first match of the season, MacLean scored in the first leg of the UEFA Europa League second qualifying round against Luzern. In the return leg, he played 120 minutes, leading to penalty shootout after a 2–2 draw on aggregate, and made amends for his missed penalty by emphatically scoring the third penalty, which the Saints won 5–4 in the shootout to advance to the next round. MacLean played in the UEFA Europa League second qualifying round second leg against Spartak Trnava, as the club were eliminated from the Europa League. Following St Johnstone’s elimination, MacLean scored his first goal of the season, in a 2–1 win over Ross County in the opening game of the season. Two weeks later on 23 August 2014, MacLean scored on his 32nd birthday to score the only goal of the game, in a win over Aberdeen. However, in a match against Motherwell on 30 August 2014, he suffered a knee injury and was substituted in the 75th minute, as the Saints won 1–0. After an operation, it was announced that MacLean would be out for four months.

After being out for three months, he soon returned to training by almost the end of the year. MacLean made his return to the first team, starting the match, in a 2–1 win over Dundee United on 27 December 2014. During the match, he suffered a head wounds that saw him receive treatment from the club’s physio with a bandaged head and played the rest of the game. In Dave Mackay's absence, he captained captain for St Johnstone, in a 1–1 draw against Aberdeen, on 23 January 2015. Following his return from his injury, MacLean regained his first team place for St Johnstone, forming a partnership with Michael O'Halloran and Chris Kane. During a 1–1 draw against Inverness Caledonian Thistle on 2 May 2015, he suffered a “nasty” blow after being caught by an elbow in an aerial challenge that saw him with a swollen, black eye but made a recovery. Unable to recuperate scoring goals throughout the season, MacLean helped the Saints beat Aberdeen 1–0 in the last game of the season, to help the club qualify for the UEFA Europa League for the third year running. At the end of the 2014–15 season, he made twenty–eight appearances and scoring three times in all competitions.

==== 2015–16 season ====
MacLean played in both legs of the UEFA Europa League first qualifying round against Alashkert, as St Johnstone were eliminated from the tournament on away goals. After serving a one match suspension in the opening game of the season, he made return, coming on as a 61st-minute substitute, in a 1–1 draw against Inverness Caledonian Thistle. Following his return, MacLean continued to remain as the club’s first choice striker, forming a partnership with Michael O'Halloran and Graham Cummins.

A week later, on 9 August 2015, MacLean scored his first goal of the season, in a 2–1 loss against Dundee. This was followed up by scoring a brace, in a 2–1 win against Motherwell. Two weeks later, on 12 September 2015, he set up a goal for Liam Craig before scoring a hat–trick for himself, in a 4–1 win. A week later, on 22 September 2015, MacLean set up two goals, in a 3–1 win against Rangers in the last 16 of the Scottish Cup. He scored on 3 October 2015 and 17 October 2015 against Aberdeen (twice) and Partick Thistle respectively. In the Scottish League Cup match against Greenock Morton, MacLean scored the equalising goal from a penalty spot, as he helped St Johnstone win 3–1 to advance to the next round. In a match against Hearts on 19 December 2015, MacLean missed a penalty, which would have broken a deadlock for the Saints, as the match ended in a 0–0 draw. After the match, this prompted manager Tommy Wright to remove him from penalty duties.

On 23 January 2016, MacLean captained St Johnstone in absence of Dave Mackay and ended his eight-match goal drought when he scored an equaliser, in a 3–1 loss against Celtic. Five days later on 28 January 2016, he signed a contract extension with the Saints, keeping him until 2017. MacLean then scored on 22 April 2016, 30 April 2016, 7 May 2016 and 11 May 2016 against Aberdeen, Ross County, Motherwell and Celtic respectively. The 2015–16 season saw him improved his goalscoring form for the club, as he made thirty–nine appearances and scoring fifteen times in all competitions.

==== 2016–17 season ====
The start of the 2016–17 season saw MacLean score two times in the group stage of the Scottish League Cup that saw St Johnstone progress through to the knockout stage. He then scored on 13 August 2016 and 20 August 2016 against Motherwell and Celtic (also making his 100th appearance for the Saints) respectively. In a match against Partick Thistle on 10 September 2016, MacLean played in the artificial pitch and scored his fifth goal of the season, in a 2–0 win.

Since the start of the 2016–17 season, MacLean continued to regain his first team place, forming a partnership with Graham Cummins. He then scored three more goals by the end of 2016, coming against Partick Thistle, Ross County and Rangers. MacLean then spent the second half of the season, scoring against Stenhousemuir, Partick Thistle, Inverness Caledonian Thistle and Celtic. On 8 February 2017, he signed a one–year contract extension with the club. His contributions saw St Johnstone qualify for the UEFA Europa League next season. At the end of the 2016–17 season, he made thirty–nine appearances and scoring twelve times in all competitions.

==== 2017–18 season ====
Prior to the UEFA Europa League first qualifying round against FK Riteriai, manager Tommy Wright expect MacLean that he must overcome his difficulties to play in an artificial pitch at LFF Stadium. MacLean started the whole game in the first leg, as St Johnstone loss 2–1. In the return leg, he finally played on the artificial pitch, coming on as a 63rd-minute substitute, but was unable to help the Saints overcome the deficit, as the club loss 3–1 on aggregate and was eliminated from the tournament. After missing the opening game of the 2017–18 season, MacLean scored his first goal of the season, in a 4–1 win against Motherwell on 12 August 2017. Two weeks later, on 26 August 2017, he scored his 50th goal for St Johnstone in all competitions, in a 1–1 draw against Celtic.

A month later on 25 September 2017, MacLean scored his third goal of the season, in a 2–1 win against Hamilton Academical. Since the start of the 2017–18 season, he continued to establish himself as the Saints’ first choice striker despite facing competition from new signings. MacLean then scored on 18 November 2017 and 2 December 2017 against Hibernian and Kilmarnock respectively. On 28 March 2018, he scored his sixth goal of the season, in a 1–0 win against Hamilton Academical.

Shortly after announcing that MacLean would be leaving St Johnstone, he scored his seventh goal of the season, in a 2–1 loss against Dundee on 21 April 2018. MacLean scored a hat-trick in his final appearance for the Saints, a 5–1 win against Motherwell on 5 May 2018. After the match, local newspaper, The Courier described his last appearance as "fairytale hat-trick ending". At the end of the 2017–18 season, he made thirty–two appearances and scoring ten times in all competitions,

=== Heart of Midlothian ===
MacLean signed a pre-contract agreement with Heart of Midlothian on 16 April 2018. He joined the Edinburgh club on a two-year contract during the 2018 close season.

MacLean scored on his debut for Hearts on 18 July 2018 in a 2–1 victory at Cove Rangers in the Scottish League Cup. A week later, on 24 July 2018, he scored his second goal for Jam Tarts, in another Scottish League Cup win against Cowdenbeath. Three days later on 4 August 2018, MacLean scored his first league goal for the club, in a 4–1 win against Hamilton Academical. Since joining Hearts, he became involved in the first team throughout the 2018–19 season, competing with Steven Naismith and Craig Wighton. MacLean then scored his second goal for Jam Tarts, in a 4–2 win against Motherwell in the quarterfinals of the Scottish League Cup. A month later, on 23 October 2018, he scored and set up one of the goals, in a 3–0 win against Dundee. In a follow–up match against Celtic in the semifinals of the Scottish League Cup, MacLean was involved in an incident with the opposition player, Eboue Kouassi. After the match, his action was criticised by the opposition manager, Neil Lennon. As a result, he was suspended for two matches. By the second half of the season, MacLean soon lost his first team place in favour of Naismith and found himself place on the substitute bench, as well as, facing his own injury concerns. Despite this, he later scored two more goals in the second half of the season against Auchinleck Talbot and Rangers. MacLean started in the 2019 Scottish Cup final, a 2–1 defeat at the hands of Celtic. At the end of the 2018–19season, he went on to make thirty–five appearances and scoring seven times in all competitions.

At the start of the 2019–20 season, MacLean continued to find himself out of the starting eleven and found himself place on the substitute bench, due to competitions from the striker position. On 26 September 2019, he scored his first goal of the season against Aberdeen in the quarterfinals of the Scottish League Cup and the match ended in a 2–2 draw, as Hearts won on penalties. On 4 December 2019, MacLean scored his second goal of the season, in a 1–1 draw against Livingston. By the time he left Jam Tarts, MacLean made sixteen appearances and scoring two times in all competitions. At the end of the 2019–20 season, he was released by the club.

==== Raith Rovers (loan) ====
On 31 January 2020, MacLean was loaned out to Scottish League One side Raith Rovers for the rest of the 2019–20 season.

He made his debut for the club, starting the whole game, in a 1–0 win against Airdrieonians on 1 February 2020. In the semifinals of the Scottish Challenge Cup against Partick Thistle, MacLean set up the second goal of the game, in a 2–1 win top send Raith Rovers to the final. A week later, on 22 February 2020, he scored his first goal for the club, in a 1–0 win against Clyde. His third goal for Raith Rovers, in a 1–1 draw against Falkirk on 3 March 2020. However, his time at the club came to a sudden end when the season was curtailed because of the COVID-19 pandemic. As a result, Raith Rovers won the 2019–20 Scottish League One title and was promoted to the Scottish Championship. Because of this, MacLean finished off the season with promotion and relegation in one season. Following this, he made seven appearances and scoring two times in all competitions.

== International career ==
Although never capped by the senior team, MacLean represented Scotland at various age levels.

== Coaching career ==
In August 2016, MacLean revealed that he’s already received his coaching license and would like to do coaching once his playing career is over MacLean retired at the end of 2019–20 season to become a first-team coach for St Johnstone. His role as the Saints’ first team coach was influential among players, his former teammates and staff members.

In October 2020, MacLean stated that he would come out of retirement if there’s an injury crisis within the club. After manager Callum Davidson tested positive for Covid-19, MacLean took charge of St Johnstone’s match against Motherwell on 19 March 2022, helping them win 2–1.

=== St Johnstone ===
MacLean became interim manager of St Johnstone on 16 April 2023, following the departure of Callum Davidson. His first match as an interim manager for the Saints came on 22 April 2023 against Hibernian, as the club drew 1–1. An improved run of results meant that St Johnstone avoided relegation in 2022–23, which was confirmed on 20 May 2023 when the Saints beat Kilmarnock 1–0. It was announced on 27 May 2023 that MacLean would be their manager on a permanent basis.

In the 2023–24 season, MacLean made a massive change for St Johnstone, signing eleven players while also letting go of seventeen players, including long serving player and former teammate David Wotherspoon. However, he made poor start of the season, as the Saints won only once and was eliminated in the group stage of the Scottish League Cup. This prompted by the bookies to be the favourites of the first manager to be sacked in the 2023–24 season. Despite being confidence that the club will bounce back, the results has not improved for that Johnstone, which saw them at the bottom of the table. Despite calling for improvements, the club failed to do that when they loss 4–0 against St Mirren on 28 October 2023. In a post-match interview, MacLean made some scathing words towards his own players, for which he was criticised by the Scottish media.

MacLean was sacked by St Johnstone on 29 October 2023, after a run of nine games without a win left them bottom of the 2023–24 Scottish Premiership table. Local newspaper made an assessment of his sacking, due to budget cuts made by the Saints, lack of prolific strikers and early elimination in the Scottish League Cup.

=== Queen's Park ===
On 21 June 2024, MacLean joined his former teammate and manager Callum Davidson as his assistant manager at Queen's Park. However, after the sacking of Davidson, he was appointed as the club’s interim head coach for the rest of the 2024–25 season.

MacLean’s first match in charge for Queen’s Park came on 23 March 2025 against Greenock Morton, as the club went on to lose 2–1. In the league, he was unable to win any matches, with the club finishing in eighth place. Following this, MacLean left Queen’s Park after Sean Crighton was appointed as manager.

== Personal life ==
Following his return from his injury in late–2014, MacLean’s knee injury caused him not to play in the artificial pitch for the rest of his playing career, due to fears from manager Tommy Wright that allow him to play on artificial pitch could worsen his knee during his time at St Johnstone. For example, he did not play at Palmerston Park (Queen of the South’s stadium), New Douglas Park (Hamilton Academical’s stadium), Rugby Park (Kilmarnock’s stadium), Firhill Stadium (Partick Thistle’s stadium) and Stark's Park (Raith Rovers’ stadium). Despite this, MacLean did play in the artificial pitch without having any injuries, which were against Patrick Thistle twice during the 2016–17 season and FK Riteriai. He also played three times at Stark's Park while on loan at Raith Rovers.

He spoke about not playing in the artificial pitch, saying: "It is always frustrating to miss any game but knowing you are fit makes it even worse missing out. But the astro is too big a risk. It’s for the best but I am still trying to get my head round it. I just have to deal with it." MacLean later stated that manager Tommy Wright made a decision to drop out of the squad whenever St Johnstone plays away in an artificial pitch. After scoring against Hamilton Academical in the opening game of the 2018–19 season, manager Tommy Wright defended his action, stating that it was his decision to drop MacLean, citing medical advice. At one point, as a result of being dropped from the squad, he did commentary for St Johnstone for a match against Kilmarnock on 15 September 2016.

MacLean is married and together they have two children, son and daughter, who were both born in Sheffield. His son is at the University of Aberdeen, studying chartered accountancy. The family lived in Sheffield and Plymouth before moving back to Scotland. He described himself as a "football geek".

== Career statistics ==
Appearances and goals by club, season and competition
Club	Season	League			National Cup		League Cup		Other		Total	
Club	Season	Division	Apps	Goals	Apps	Goals	Apps	Goals	Apps	Goals	Apps	Goals
Rangers	2002–03	Scottish Premier League	3	0	1	0	0	0	0	0	4	0
Rangers	2003–04	Scottish Premier League	0	0	0	0	0	0	0	0	0	0
Rangers	Total		3	0	1	0	0	0	0	0	4	0
Scunthorpe United (loan)	2003–04	Third Division	42	23	5	0	2	1	3 (Note: Appearance(s) in Football League Trophy)	1	52	25
Sheffield Wednesday	2004–05	League One	36	18	1	0	2	0	2 (Note: One appearance and one goal in Football League Trophy, one appearance and one goal in League One play-offs)	2	41	20
Sheffield Wednesday	2005–06	Championship	6	2	0	0	0	0	—		6	2
Sheffield Wednesday	2006–07	Championship	41	12	2	1	0	0	—		43	13
Sheffield Wednesday	Total		83	32	3	1	2	0	2	2	90	35
Cardiff City	2007–08	Championship	15	1	1	0	2	0	—		18	1
Plymouth Argyle	2007–08	Championship	17	3	0	0	0	0	—		17	3
Plymouth Argyle	2008–09	Championship	21	2	1	0	1	0	—		23	2
Plymouth Argyle	2009–10	Championship	3	0	0	0	1	0	—		4	0
Plymouth Argyle	2010–11	League One	7	0	0	0	1	0	1	1	9	1
Plymouth Argyle	Total		48	5	1	0	3	0	1	1	53	6
Aberdeen (loan)	2009–10	Scottish Premier League	16	5	2	0	0	0	0	0	18	5
Oxford United (loan)	2010–11	League Two	31	6	0	0	0	0	0	0	31	6
Yeovil Town	2011–12	League One	20	3	2	0	1	0	1	1	24	4
Cheltenham Town (loan)	2011–12	League Two	3	1	0	0	0	0	0	0	3	1
St Johnstone	2012–13	Scottish Premier League	31	5	2	1	2	2	0	0	35	8
St Johnstone	2013–14	Scottish Premiership	21	8	3	1	1	0	4 (Note: Appearances in UEFA Europa League)	1	29	10
St Johnstone	2014–15	Scottish Premiership	24	2	0	0	0	0	4	1	28	3
St Johnstone	2015–16	Scottish Premiership	33	14	1	0	3	1	2	0	39	15
St Johnstone	2016–17	Scottish Premiership	32	9	2	1	5	2	—		39	12
St Johnstone	2017–18	Scottish Premiership	30	9	0	0	1	0	2	0	33	9
St Johnstone	Total		171	47	8	3	12	5	12	2	203	57
Heart of Midlothian	2018–19	Scottish Premiership	25	3	4	1	6	3	—		35	7
Heart of Midlothian	2019–20	Scottish Premiership	10	1	0	0	6	1	—		16	2
Heart of Midlothian	Total		35	4	4	1	12	4	0	0	51	9
Raith Rovers (loan)	2019–20	Scottish League One	6	2	0	0	0	0	1 (Note: Appearance in Scottish Challenge Cup)	0	7	2
Career total			473	129	27	5	34	10	20	7	554	151

== Managerial record ==
As of match played 1 May 2025

Managerial record by team and tenure
Team	Nat	From	To	Record				
Team	Nat	From	To	G	W	D	L	Win %
St Johnstone	(Scotland)	22 April 2023	29 October 2023	19	4	6	9	21.05
Queen's Park	(Scotland)	16 March 2025	2 May 2025	8	0	3	5	0.00
Career total				27	4	9	14	14.81

- Initially caretaker and appointed permanently on 27 May 2023

== Honours ==
Rangers

- Scottish Cup: 2002–03

Sheffield Wednesday

- Football League One play-offs: 2005

St Johnstone

- Scottish Cup: 2013–14

Raith Rovers

- Scottish League One : 2019-20

Individual

- Scunthorpe United Player of the Year: 2003–04
- Sheffield Wednesday’s Player of the Year: 2004–05
