= List of Cork City F.C. seasons =

This is the list of Cork City F.C. seasons since the club's return to League of Ireland Premier Division competition in 2012. It includes European and Cup participation.

== League seasons ==
Season	League										FAI Cup	League of Ireland Cup	Europe/other		Top Scorer
Season	Division	P	W	D	L	GF	GA	GD	PTS	Pos	FAI Cup	League of Ireland Cup	Europe/other		Top Scorer
2023	League of Ireland Prem	36	8	7	21	35	64	-29	31	9th	SF	-	N/A		Ruairi Keating
2022	League of Ireland First	32	20	8	4	63	22	+41	68	1st	R2	-	N/A		
2021	League of Ireland First	27	8	9	10	37	28	+9	33	6th	R2	-	N/A		Cian Murphy
2020	League of Ireland Prem	18	2	5	11	10	30	−20	11	10th	R2	-	N/A		
2019	League of Ireland Prem	36	9	10	17	29	49	−20	37	8th	R2	QF	Europa League	1st Qual	Graham Cummins
2018	League of Ireland Prem	36	24	5	7	71	27	+44	77	2nd	R/U	R2	Champions League	1st Qual	Kieran Sadlier
2017	League of Ireland Prem	33	24	4	5	67	23	44	76	1st	W	SF	Europa League	2nd Qual	Sean Maguire
2016	League of Ireland Prem	33	21	7	5	65	23	42	70	2nd	W	QF	Europa League	3rd Qual	Sean Maguire
2015	League of Ireland Prem	33	19	10	4	57	25	32	67	2nd	R/U	QF	Europa League	1st Qual	Karl Sheppard
2014	League of Ireland Prem	33	22	6	5	51	25	+26	72	2nd	R3	QF	N/A		Billy Dennehy
2013	League of Ireland Prem	33	13	7	13	47	50	−3	46	6th	R3	QF	N/A		Ciarán Kilduff
2012	League of Ireland Prem	30	8	12	10	38	36	+2	36	6th	R3	R2	N/A		Vinny Sullivan

== Key ==
- P = Played
- W = Games won
- D = Games drawn
- L = Games lost
- F = Goals for
- A = Goals against
- Pts = Points
- Pos = Final position
- League of Ireland Prem = League of Ireland Premier League
- League of Ireland Div1 = League of Ireland First Division
- 1st Qual = 1st Qualifying Round
- 2nd Qual = 2nd Qualifying Round
- 3rd Qual = 3rd Qualifying Round
- Qual P/O = Qualifying Play Offs
- GS = Group Stage
- R1 = Round 1
- R2 = Round 2
- R3 = Round 3
- R4 = Round 4
- R5 = Round 5
- Rof16 = Round of 16
- QF = Quarter-finals
- SF = Semi-finals
- R/U = Runners Up
- W= Winners

Champions	Runners-up	Third-place	Play-offs	Promoted	Relegated
