= 2017–18 St Johnstone F.C. season =

St Johnstone
2017–18 season
- Chairman: Steve Brown
- Manager: Tommy Wright
- Stadium: McDiarmid Park; Perth, Scotland (Capacity: 10,696)
- Scottish Premiership: 8th
- Scottish Cup: Fifth round, lost to Hearts
- Scottish League Cup: Second round, lost to Partick Thistle
- Europa League: First qualifying round, lost to FK Trakai
- Top goalscorer: League: Steven MacLean (9); All: Steven MacLean (9)
- Highest home attendance: 6,887 vs. Rangers; 13 October 2017
- Lowest home attendance: 2,037 vs. Hamilton Academical; 28 March 2018
- Average home league attendance: 3,809
Home colours	Away colours

The 2017–18 season was the club's fifth season in the Scottish Premiership and their ninth consecutive season in the top flight of Scottish football. St Johnstone also competed in the Scottish Cup, the League Cup, and after a years absence they competed in qualifying for the Europa League. They were knocked out by FK Trakai in the First qualifying round and finished Eighth place in the League. This was the final season at the club for legends Alan Mannus, Steven MacLean, and Chris Millar, with the latter being rewarded with a testimonial.

== Results and fixtures ==
Win Draw Loss Postponed

=== Pre-season ===
22 June 2017 Friendly	Rangers	0−0	St Johnstone	Auchenhowie
15:00		Report		Stadium: Rangers Training Centre

1 July 2017 Friendly	St Johnstone	0–3	Aberdeen	McDiarmid Park
15:00 BST		AFC Report	Rooney 32'; Christie 43'; Anderson 85'	Attendance: 1,939

15 July 2017 Friendly	St Johnstone	3−0	Sunderland	McDiarmid Park
14:00 BST	MacLean 19'; Wotherspoon 21', 24'	Report; Highlights		Attendance: 2,032; Referee: Nick Walsh

18 July 2017 Friendly	Rangers	0−1	St Johnstone	Auchenhowie
14:30			Hendry 80'	Stadium: Rangers Training Centre

=== Scottish Premiership ===
5 August 2017 1	Kilmarnock	1–2	St Johnstone	Rugby Park, Kilmarnock
15:00	Boyd 59'	Report	Wotherspoon 10'; O'Halloran 89'	Attendance: 3,935; Referee: Steven McLean

12 August 2017 2	St Johnstone	4–1	Motherwell	McDiarmid Park, Perth
15:00	MacLean 8'; O'Halloran 18', 74'; Davidson 90'	Report	Rose 28'; McHugh (yellow card) 36' (yellow-red card) 76'; Carson (red card) 63'; Dunne (red card) 89'	Attendance: 3,451; Referee: Craig Thomson

19 August 2017 3	St Johnstone	1–0	Partick Thistle	McDiarmid Park, Perth
15:00	O'Halloran 33'	Report		Attendance: 3,470; Referee: Barry Cook

26 August 2017 4	Celtic	1–1	St Johnstone	Celtic Park, Glasgow
15:00	McGregor 79'	Report	MacLean 39'	Attendance: 58,466; Referee: Willie Collum

9 September 2017 5	St Johnstone	1–1	Hibernian	McDiarmid Park, Perth
15:00	O'Halloran 48'	Report	Paton 61' (o.g.)	Attendance: 5,591; Referee: Nick Walsh

16 September 2017 6	Dundee	3–2	St Johnstone	Dens Park, Dundee
15:00	Leitch-Smith 9', 65'; Moussa 78' (pen.); O'Dea (yellow card) 80' (yellow-red card) 83'	Report	Craig 75' (pen.), 84' (pen.)	Attendance: 6,001; Referee: Alan Muir

23 September 2017 7	St Johnstone	2–1	Hamilton Academical	McDiarmid Park, Perth
15:00	MacLean 49'; Davidson 84'	Report	Docherty 24'; MacKinnon (red card) 90'	Attendance: 2,880; Referee: Willie Collum

30 September 2017 8	Aberdeen	3–0	St Johnstone	Pittodrie Stadium, Aberdeen
15:00	Rooney 7', 18', 81' (pen.)	Report		Attendance: 14,879; Referee: John Beaton

13 October 2017 9	St Johnstone	0–3	Rangers	McDiarmid Park, Perth
19:45	Anderson (yellow card) 65' (yellow-red card) 71'	BBC Report	Peña 27', 78'; Dorrans 86'	Attendance: 6,887; Referee: Don Robertson

21 October 2017 10	Heart of Midlothian	1–0	St Johnstone	Murrayfield Stadium, Edinburgh
15:00	Lafferty 74'	Report		Attendance: 18,534; Referee: Nick Walsh

25 October 2017 11	St Johnstone	0–0	Ross County	McDiarmid Park, Perth
19:45		BBC Report		Attendance: 2,267; Referee: Barry Cook

28 October 2017 12	Partick Thistle	1–0	St Johnstone	Firhill Stadium, Glasgow
15:00	Storey 74'	BBC Report		Attendance: 2,870; Referee: John Beaton

4 November 2017 13	St Johnstone	0–4	Celtic	McDiarmid Park, Perth
12:30		BBC Sport	Sinclair 28'; Dembélé 72'; Anderson 75' (o.g.); Ntcham 89'	Attendance: 6,800; Referee: Bobby Madden

18 November 2017 14	Hibernian	1–2	St Johnstone	Easter Road, Edinburgh
15:00	Stokes 90+1' (pen.)	BBC Report	Davidson 74'; MacLean 90+3'	Attendance: 17,044; Referee: Craig Thomson (referee)

25 November 2017 15 (Note: Match postponed due to Motherwell involvement in the League Cup.)	Motherwell	P–P	St Johnstone	Fir Park, Motherwell
15:00

2 December 2017 16	St Johnstone	1–2	Kilmarnock	McDiarmid Park, Perth
15:00	MacLean 43'	BBC Report	Findlay 10'; Brophy 66'	Attendance: 2.950; Referee: John Beaton

9 December 2017 17	Hamilton Academical	0–1	St Johnstone	New Douglas Park, Hamilton
15:00		BBC Report	Scougall 66'	Attendance: 1,451; Referee: Craig Thomson

13 December 2017 18	St Johnstone	0–3	Aberdeen	McDiarmid Park, Perth
19:45		BBC Report	Rooney 20'; Arnason 33'; Christie 60'	Attendance: 2,911; Referee: Alan Muir

16 December 2017 19	Rangers	1–3	St Johnstone	Ibrox Stadium, Glasgow
15:00	Morelos 5'	BBC Report	Alston 10'; Johnstone 61'; Cummins 71'	Attendance: 47,923; Referee: Don Robertson

23 December 2017 20	St Johnstone	0–0	Heart of Midlothian	McDiarmid Park, Perth
15:00		BBC Report	Cochrane (yellow card) 56' (yellow-red card) 78'	Attendance: 4,975; Referee: Clancy

27 December 2017 21	Ross County	1–1	St Johnstone	Victoria Park, Dingwall
19:45	Schalk 54' (pen.)	BBC Report	Johnstone 2'	Attendance: 3,3636; Referee: Greg Aitken

30 December 2017 22	St Johnstone	0–2	Dundee	McDiarmid Park, Perth
15:00	Foster (red card) 22'	BBC Report	Haber 3'; Leitch-Smith 90'	Attendance: 4,679; Referee: Willie Collum

27 January 2018 24	St Johnstone	1–3	Partick Thistle	McDiarmid Park, Perth
15:00	Craig 74' (pen.)	BBC Report	Lawless 13'; Sammon 64'; Edwards 90+4'	Attendance: 2,848; Referee: Gavin Duncan

31 January 2018 25 (Note: Match postponed due to Saints involvement in Scottish Cup.)	St Johnstone	P–P	Hamilton Academical	McDiarmid Park, Perth
		Report

3 February 2018 26	Heart of Midlothian	1–0	St Johnstone	Tynecastle Park, Edinburgh
15:00	Milinković 46'	BBC Report	Wotherspoon (yellow card) 57' (yellow-red card) 62'	Attendance: 16,197; Referee: Andrew Dallas

6 February 2018 15 (Note: Rearranged game after postponement.)	Motherwell	2–0	St Johnstone	Fir Park, Motherwell
19:45	Campbell 64'; Main 70'	BBC Report		Attendance: 3,227; Referee: Don Robertson

17 February 2018 27	Celtic	0–0	St Johnstone	Celtic Park, Glasgow
15:00		BBC Report		Attendance: 56,867; Referee: John Beaton

24 February 2018 28	St Johnstone	2–0	Ross County	McDiarmid Park, Perth
15:00	Davidson 29', 40'	BBC Report		Attendance: 2,533; Referee: Willie Collum

28 February 2018 29	St Johnstone	1–4	Rangers	McDiarmid Park, Perth
19:45	Kerr 62'	BBC Report	Tavernier 12' (pen.); Windass 25'; Goss 40'; Morelos 56'	Attendance: 5,737; Referee: Steven McLean

7 March 2018 23	Kilmarnock	2–0	St Johnstone	Rugby Park, Kilmarnock
19:45	Boyd 30' (pen.); Erwin 58'	BBC Report	Kerr (red card) 42'	Attendance: 3,807; Referee: Willie Collum

10 March 2018 30	Dundee	0–4	St Johnstone	Dens Park, Dundee
15:00		BBC Report	Piggott 24' (o.g.); Kane 37', 66'; Alston 64'	Attendance: 5,336; Referee: Craig Thomson

16 March 2018 31	St Johnstone	1–1	Hibernian	McDiarmid Park, Perth
19:45	Kane 83'	BBC Report	Ambrose 2'; Marciano (red card) 14'	Attendance: 3,652; Referee: John Beaton

28 March 2018 25 (Note: Rearranged game after postponement.)	St Johnstone	1–0	Hamilton Academical	McDiarmid Park, Perth
19:45	McMann 61' (o.g.)	BBC Report		Attendance: 2,037; Referee: Euan Anderson

31 March 2018 32	Aberdeen	4–1	St Johnstone	Pittodrie Stadium, Aberdeen
15:00	Christie 34'; May 41'; Stewart 51', 82'	BBC Report	Davidson (yellow card) 19'; Anderson (yellow card) 65'; Willock 68'	Attendance: 14,161; Referee: Bobby Madden

7 April 2018 33	St Johnstone	0–0	Motherwell	McDiarmid Park, Perth
15:00	Foster (yellow card) 62'; Davidson (yellow card) 80'	BBC Report	Kipré (yellow card) 51'; Rose (yellow card) 75'	Attendance: 2,409; Referee: Willie Collum

21 April 2018 34	Dundee	2–1	St Johnstone	Dens Park, Dundee
15:00	Moussa 1', 88'	BBC Report	MacLean 85'	Attendance: 5,592; Referee: Don Robertson

28 April 2018 35	St Johnstone	1–1	Partick Thistle	McDiarmid Park, Perth
15:00	Shaughnessy 39'	BBC Report	Sammon 89' (pen.)	Attendance: 2,925; Referee: Alan Muir

5 May 2018 36	Motherwell	1–5	St Johnstone	Fir Park, Motherwell
15:00	Bigirimana 78' (yellow card) 84'; Çiftçi (yellow card) 83'	BBC Report	MacLean 31', 40', 56'; Anderson 36'; Davidson (yellow card) 79'; McMillan 81'	Attendance: 3,524; Referee: Gavin Duncan

8 May 2018 37	Hamilton Academical	1–2	St Johnstone	New Douglas Park, Hamilton
19:45	Imrie 82'	BBC Report	McMillan 65' (pen.); Wotherspoon 80'	Attendance: 2,367; Referee: Kevin Clancy

12 May 2018 38	St Johnstone	1–1	Ross County	McDiarmid Park, Perth
15:00	Wotherspoon 90+2'	BBC Report	Curran 3'	Attendance: Nick Walsh; Referee: 3,279

=== UEFA Europa League ===
==== Qualifying phase ====
29 June 2017 First qualifying round 1st leg	St Johnstone	1–2	(Lithuania) Trakai	McDiarmid Park, Perth
19:45	Shaughnessy 32'	UEFA Report; BBC Report	Maksimov 14'; Šilėnas 36'	Attendance: 5,636; Referee: Fran Jović (Croatia)

6 July 2017 First qualifying round 2nd leg	Trakai (Lithuania)	1–0 (3–1 agg.)	St Johnstone	LFF Stadium, Vilnius
17:00	Maksimov 88'	BBC Report		Attendance: 2,000; Referee: Stanislav Todorov (Bulgaria)

=== Scottish League Cup ===
8 August 2017 Second round	St Johnstone	0–3	Partick Thistle	McDiarmid Park, Perth
19:45		Report	Lawless 50' (pen.); Edwards 62'; Erskine 90'	Attendance: 2,619; Referee: Euan Anderson

=== Scottish Cup ===
20 January 2018 Fourth round	Albion Rovers	P–P	St Johnstone	Coatbridge
15:00		Report		Stadium: Cliftonhill

23 January 2018 Fourth round	Albion Rovers	P–P	St Johnstone	Coatbridge
19:45		Report		Stadium: Cliftonhill

29 January 2018 Fourth round	Albion Rovers	0–4	St Johnstone	Coatbridge
19:45		BBC Report	Kane 3', 57', 70'; McClean 51'	Stadium: Cliftonhill; Attendance: 1,130; Referee: Mat Northcroft

10 February 2018 Fifth round	Heart of Midlothian	3–0	St Johnstone	Edinburgh
15:00	Lafferty 7', 58'; Mitchell 54'	BBC Report		Stadium: Tynecastle Park; Attendance: 12,393; Referee: Kevin Clancy

== Squad statistics ==
=== Appearances ===
As of 12 May 2018

No.	Pos	Player	Premiership		Europa League		League Cup		Scottish Cup		Total	
No.	Pos	Player	Apps	Goals	Apps	Goals	Apps	Goals	Apps	Goals	Apps	Goals
1	GK	(Northern Ireland) Alan Mannus	22	0	0	0	1	0	2	0	25	0
3	DF	(England) Scott Tanser	24+5	0	1	0	0	0	1	0	31	0
4	MF	(Scotland) Blair Alston	17+7	2	2	0	1	0	1+1	0	29	2
5	DF	(Republic of Ireland) Joe Shaughnessy (c)	38	1	2	1	1	0	2	0	43	2
6	DF	(Scotland) Steven Anderson	34	1	0	0	1	0	1	0	36	1
7	MF	(Scotland) Chris Millar	13+3	0	1+1	0	0	0	1	0	19	0
8	MF	(Scotland) Murray Davidson	29	5	1	0	1	0	2	0	33	5
9	FW	(Scotland) Steven MacLean	26+4	9	1+1	0	1	0	0	0	33	9
10	MF	(Scotland) David Wotherspoon	25+10	3	0	0	0	0	0	0	35	3
11	MF	(Wales) George Williams	10+1	0	0	0	0	0	0	0	11	0
12	GK	(Scotland) Zander Clark	16+1	0	2	0	0	0	0	0	19	0
14	DF	(Scotland) Aaron Comrie	12	0	0	0	0	0	0+1	0	13	0
15	DF	(Scotland) Jason Kerr	15	1	0	0	0	0	2	0	17	1
16	FW	(Republic of Ireland) David McMillan	2+2	2	0	0	0	0	0	0	4	2
17	FW	(Scotland) Denny Johnstone	8+12	2	0	0	0	0	1+1	0	22	2
19	DF	(Scotland) Richard Foster	22+2	0	2	0	1	0	1	0	28	0
20	MF	(Northern Ireland) Kyle McClean	0+5	0	0	0	0	0	1	1	6	1
21	MF	(Scotland) Stefan Scougall	18+6	1	1+1	0	0+1	0	0	0	27	1
22	DF	(Scotland) Keith Watson	1+1	0	0	0	0	0	0	0	2	0
23	DF	(Scotland) Liam Gordon	5+2	0	0	0	0	0	1	0	8	0
24	DF	(Scotland) Brian Easton	12+1	0	1	0	1	0	0	0	15	0
25	FW	(Scotland) Chris Kane	10+2	3	1+1	0	0+1	0	2	3	17	6
26	MF	(Scotland) Liam Craig	17+10	3	2	0	1	0	1	0	31	3
27	MF	(Scotland) Craig Thomson	0+4	0	0	0	0	0	0	0	4	0
28	MF	(England) Matty Willock	6+5	1	0	0	0	0	1	0	12	1
30	GK	(Scotland) Mark Hurst	0	0	0	0	0	0	0	0	0	0
37	MF	(Scotland) Ali McCann	1+2	0	0	0	0	0	0+1	0	4	0
43	MF	(Scotland) John Robertson	0+2	0	0	0	0	0	0	0	2	0
50	FW	(England) Callum Hendry	1+4	0	0	0	0	0	0	0	5	0
Players who left the club during the 2017–18 season
11	FW	(Scotland) Michael O'Halloran (signed for Rangers)	12+4	5	0	0	1	0	0	0	17	5
18	MF	(Northern Ireland) Paul Paton (signed for Plymouth Argyle)	16+1	0	1	0	0	0	1	0	19	0
28	DF	(Scotland) Ally Gilchrist (signed for Shamrock Rovers)	0	0	2	0	0	0	0	0	2	0
29	FW	(Republic of Ireland) Graham Cummins (signed for Cork City)	6+9	1	1+1	0	0+1	0	0	0	18	1
31	FW	(Scotland) Greg Hurst (loaned to East Fife & Forfar Athletic)	0	0	0	0	0	0	0	0	0	0
32	DF	(Scotland) Cameron Thompson (loaned to Stirling Albion)	0	0	0	0	0	0	0	0	0	0

== Team statistics ==
=== League table ===
Pos	Team	Pld	W	D	L	GF	GA	GD	Pts	Qualification or relegation (Note: Teams play each other three times (33 matches) before the league is split into two groups (the top six and the bottom six).)
6	Heart of Midlothian	38	12	13	13	39	39	0	49	
7	Motherwell	38	13	9	16	43	49	−6	48	
8	St Johnstone	38	12	10	16	42	53	−11	46	
9	Dundee	38	11	6	21	36	57	−21	39	
10	Hamilton Academical	38	9	6	23	47	68	−21	33	

Source: Soccerway BBC
Rules for classification: 1) Points; 2) Goal difference; 3) Goals scored; 4) Play-off (only if deciding champion, UEFA competitions qualification and second-stage group allocation).

== See also ==
- List of St Johnstone F.C. seasons
