= Craig Thomson (footballer, born 1995) =

Scottish footballer

Personal information
- Date of birth: 10 March 1995 (age 31)
- Place of birth: Kirkcaldy, Scotland
- Height: 5 ft 8 in (1.73 m)
- Position: Midfielder

Team information
- Current team: Dundee North End

Youth career
- Kennoway United
- 2008–2013: St Johnstone

Senior career*
Years	Team	Apps	(Gls)
2013–2018	St Johnstone	24	(1)
2014–2015	→ Elgin City (loan)	20	(0)
2016–2017	→ Stranraer (loan)	19	(3)
2018–2019	East Fife	14	(0)
2019	Brechin City	13	(1)
2019–2021	Airdrieonians	39	(2)
2021–2024	Forfar Athletic	70	(5)
2024–	Dundee North End		
- * Club domestic league appearances and goals as of 4 May 2024

Craig Thomson (born 10 March 1995) is a Scottish professional footballer who plays as a midfielder for Midlands Premier League side Dundee North End. He has previously played for St Johnstone, Elgin City, Stranraer, East Fife, Brechin City, Airdrieonians and Forfar Athletic.

== Career ==
Thomson played for Kennoway United before joining St Johnstone in 2008, turning professional in 2011. He made his debut for St Johnstone on 19 April 2014, against Dundee United, coming on as a late substitute.

In December 2014, Thomson joined Elgin City on loan, initially until January 2015, then the loan was extended for the rest of the season.

Thomson made his first start for St Johnstone on 16 January 2016, in a 0–0 draw at home to Hamilton Academical. On 25 March 2016, he signed a new contract, keeping him at the club until 2018. Thomson's season ended early through injury in April 2016, when following a match with Dundee United it was revealed that he had suffered a fractured collarbone.

On 11 August 2016, Thomson signed for Stranraer on loan until January 2017. He was released from his contract with St Johnstone by mutual consent on 17 January 2018, signing for Scottish League One side East Fife shortly after.

Thomson moved to Brechin City in January 2019.

On 25 May 2019, Thomson signed for Airdrieonians, remaining with the club until May 2021.

In June 2021, Thomson joined Scottish League Two side Forfar Athletic on a two-year deal.

== Career statistics ==
As of 27 June 2021

Appearances and goals by club, season and competition
Club	Season	League			Scottish Cup		League Cup		Other		Total	
Club	Season	Division	Apps	Goals	Apps	Goals	Apps	Goals	Apps	Goals	Apps	Goals
St Johnstone	2013–14	Scottish Premiership	1	0	0	0	0	0	0	0	1	0
St Johnstone	2014–15	Scottish Premiership	0	0	0	0	0	0	0	0	0	0
St Johnstone	2015–16	Scottish Premiership	10	0	1	0	0	0	0	0	11	0
St Johnstone	2016–17	Scottish Premiership	9	1	0	0	2	0	—		11	1
St Johnstone	2017–18	Scottish Premiership	4	0	0	0	0	0	0	0	4	0
St Johnstone	Total		24	1	1	0	2	0	0	0	27	1
Elgin City (loan)	2014–15	Scottish League Two	20	0	0	0	0	0	0	0	20	0
Stranraer (loan)	2016–17	Scottish League One	19	3	0	0	0	0	2 (Note: Appearances in the Scottish Challenge Cup)	0	21	3
East Fife	2017–18	Scottish League One	8	0	1	0	0	0	0	0	9	0
East Fife	2018–19	Scottish League One	6	0	0	0	4	0	1	0	11	0
East Fife	Total		14	0	1	0	4	0	1	0	20	0
Brechin City	2018–19	Scottish League One	13	1	0	0	0	0	0	0	13	1
Airdrieonians	2019–20	Scottish League One	18	1	1	0	4	0	2	0	25	1
Airdrieonians	2020–21	Scottish League One	21	1	1	0	4	1	3 (Note: Appearances in Championship play-offs)	0	29	2
Airdrieonians	Total		39	2	2	0	8	1	5	0	54	3
Forfar Athletic	2021–22	Scottish League Two	0	0	0	0	0	0	0	0	0	0
Career total			129	7	4	0	14	1	8	0	155	8
