= 2016–17 St Johnstone F.C. season =

St Johnstone
2016–17 season
- Chairman: Steve Brown
- Manager: Tommy Wright
- Stadium: McDiarmid Park; Perth, Scotland (Capacity: 10,696)
- Scottish Premiership: 4th
- Scottish Cup: Fifth round lost to Partick Thistle
- Scottish League Cup: Quarter final lost to Aberdeen
- Top goalscorer: League: Danny Swanson (10); All: Danny Swanson (15)
- Highest home attendance: 7,979 vs Rangers; Scottish Premiership; 28 December 2016
- Lowest home attendance: 2,549 vs Inverness Caledonian Thistle; Scottish Premiership; 3 December 2016
- Average home league attendance: 4,368
Home colours	Away colours

The 2016–17 season was the club's fourth season in the Scottish Premiership and their eighth consecutive season in the top flight of Scottish football. St Johnstone also competed in the Scottish Cup and the League Cup.

== Season summary ==
Tommy Wright was kept as manager and remained for the season. The Saints again finished in Fourth place but qualified for European Football. Danny Swanson was the club's Top League and Season scorer, but a few weeks before the end of the season, he signed for a pre-contract agreement with Hibernian.

== Results and fixtures ==
Win Draw Loss Postponed

=== Pre-season ===
9 July 2016	Glentoran	1 – 2	St Johnstone	The Oval
	Chris Lavery	Report	MacLean; Kane

12 July 2016	Livingston	1 – 1	St Johnstone	Tony Macaroni Arena
	Josh Mullin 56'	Report	Coulson 10'	Referee: Beaton

19 July 2016	St Johnstone	2 – 0	Bradford City	McDiarmid Park
	Cummins 33'; McKay 37'	Report		Attendance: 1,177; Referee: Collum

=== Scottish Premiership ===
7 August 2016 1	St Johnstone	0 – 0	Aberdeen	McDiarmid Park
12:15	Craig (yellow card) 34'; Cummins (yellow card) 37'	BBC Report; SPFL Report		Attendance: 5,728; Referee: Collum

13 August 2016 2	Motherwell	1 – 2	St Johnstone	Fir Park
15:00	Cadden 47'; Tait (yellow card) 39'; Clay (yellow card) 74'; McDonald (yellow card) 82'	BBC; SPFL	Swanson 56'; MacLean 75'; Kane (yellow card) 42'; Swanson (yellow card) 50'; Davidson (yellow card) 90'	Attendance: 3,739; Referee: Euan Anderson

20 August 2016 3	St Johnstone	2 – 4	Celtic	McDiarmid Park
12:15	Swanson 83' (pen.); MacLean 89'; Paton (yellow card) 45'; Davidson (yellow card) 58'; MacLean (yellow card) 86'	BBC; SPFL	Griffiths 28'; Sinclair 40'; Forrest 44'; Christie 90'; Griffiths (yellow card) 38'; Janko (yellow card) 43'; Bitton (yellow card) 59'	Attendance: 6,823; Referee: Craig Thomson

27 August 2016 4	Inverness Caledonian Thistle	2 – 1	St Johnstone	Caledonian Stadium
15:00	Draper 59'; Meekings 90'; Draper (yellow card) 66'	BBC; SPFL	Foster 79'; Wotherspoon (yellow card) 57'	Attendance: 2,729; Referee: Stephen Finnie

10 September 2016 5	Partick Thistle	0 – 2	St Johnstone	Firhill Stadium
15:00		BBC; SPFL	Anderson 21'; MacLean 64'; Swanson (yellow card) 70'	Attendance: 2,885; Referee: Nick Walsh

17 September 2016 6	St Johnstone	1 – 0	Heart of Midlothian	McDiarmid Park
15:00	Cummins 57'; Cummins (yellow card) 15'; Foster (yellow card) 33'; Davidson (yellow card) 49'; MacLean (yellow card) 75'; Kane (yellow card) 85'; Craig (yellow card) 90'	BBC; SPFL	Rossi (yellow card) 75'	Attendance: 5,456; Referee: John Beaton

25 September 2016 7	Hamilton Academical	1 – 1	St Johnstone	New Douglas Park
15:00	Docherty 37'; Donati (yellow card) 58'; Doherty (yellow card) 63'; MacKinnon (yellow card) 70'; Seaborne (yellow card) 78'; Crawford (yellow card) 90'	BBC; SPFL	Craig 82'; Davidson (yellow card) 33'	Attendance: 1,705; Referee: Euan Anderson

1 October 2016 8	Ross County	0 – 2	St Johnstone	Victoria Park
15:00		BBC; SPFL	Swanson 42' (pen.); Kane 73'	Attendance: 3,299; Referee: Crawford Allan

15 October 2016 9	St Johnstone	0 – 1	Kilmarnock	McDiarmid Park
15:00		BBC; SPFL	S Boyd 76'	Attendance: 2,930; Referee: Steven McLean

23 October 2016 10	St Johnstone	2 – 1	Dundee	McDiarmid Park
15:00	Anderson 62'; Swanson 75' (pen.)	BBC; SPFL	Loy 88' (pen.)	Attendance: 3,646; Referee: Andrew Dallas

26 October 2016 11	Rangers	1 – 1	St Johnstone	Ibrox Stadium
19:45	Garner 62'	BBC; SPFL	Alston 5'	Attendance: 46,563; Referee: Kevin Clancy

29 October 2016 12	St Johnstone	1 – 2	Partick Thistle	McDiarmid Park
15:00	MacLean 18'	BBC; SPFL	Doolan 17'; Osman 90'	Attendance: 3,096; Referee: Barry Cook

5 November 2016 13	Heart of Midlothian	2 – 2	St Johnstone	Tynecastle Stadium
15:00	Buaben 25' (yellow card) 61'; Igor Rossi (yellow card) 77'; Paterson 87'; Muirhead (yellow card) 89'	Report	Alston (yellow card) 7'; Swanson 41'; Kane 85'; Easton (yellow card) 90+3'	Attendance: 16,421; Referee: (Scotland) Don Robertson

19 November 2016 14	St Johnstone	2 – 4	Ross County	McDiarmid Park
15:00	Anderson (yellow card) 4'; Paton (yellow card) 55'; Foster (yellow card) 62'; Swanson 65' (pen.); MacLean 80'	Report	McEveley 24' (yellow card) 65'; Routis 38' van der Weg (yellow card) 45+4'; Curran 63'; Boyce 83'	Attendance: 2,554; Referee: (Scotland) John Beaton

3 December 2016 15	St Johnstone	3 – 0	Inverness Caledonian Thistle	McDiarmid Park
15:00	Craig 14'; Coulson (yellow card) 57'; Davidson 62'; Wotherspoon (yellow card) 75'; Swanson 81'	Report	Draper (yellow card) 45+1'; Doumbouya (yellow card) 51'; Warren (yellow card) 60' (yellow-red card)	Attendance: 2,549; Referee: (Scotland) Euan Anderson

10 December 2016 16	Aberdeen	0 – 0	St Johnstone	Pittodrie Stadium
15:00	McLean (yellow card) 87'	Report	Davidson (yellow card) 58'; Kane (yellow card) 67'; MacLean (yellow card) 68'	Attendance: 11,501; Referee: (Scotland) Kevin Clancy

17 December 2016 17	St Johnstone	1 – 1	Motherwell	McDiarmid Park
15:00	Kane 62'; Foster (yellow card) 90'	Report	Clark 12' (o.g.); Moult (yellow card) 77'	Attendance: 2,836; Referee: (Scotland) Willie Collum

23 December 2016 18	Kilmarnock	0 – 1	St Johnstone	Rugby Park
19:45	Dicker (yellow card) 88'; Hendrie (yellow card) 90+2' (yellow-red card)	Report	Davidson 43' (yellow card) 62'; Wotherspoon (yellow card) 57'	Attendance: 3,056; Referee: (Scotland) Stephen Finnie

28 December 2016 19	St Johnstone	1 – 1	Rangers	McDiarmid Park
19:45	MacLean 28' (yellow card) 89'; Paton (yellow card) 69'; Foster (yellow card) 69'	Report	McKay 23'; Holt (yellow card) 35'; Hill (yellow card) 55'; Halliday (yellow card) 67'	Attendance: 7,979; Referee: (Scotland) Crawford Allan

31 December 2016 20	Dundee	3 – 0	St Johnstone	Dens Park
14:00	Bakhtaoui 15'; Kerr (yellow card) 23'; Gadzhalov 42'; Anderson 57' (o.g.)	Report	Paton (yellow card) 41'; Swanson (yellow card) 90'	Attendance: 6,492; Referee: (Scotland) Don Robertson

25 January 2017 21	Celtic	1 – 0	St Johnstone	Celtic Park
19:45	Boyata 72'; Gordon (yellow card) 81'	Report	Craig (yellow card) 17'; Paton (yellow card) 76'	Attendance: 51,057; Referee: (Scotland) Andrew Dallas

28 January 2017 22	St Johnstone	3 – 0	Hamilton Academical	McDiarmid Park
15:00	Swanson (yellow card) 30'; Cummins 53' 59'; Davidson 74'	Report	Redmond (yellow card) 34'	Attendance: 3,279; Referee: (Scotland) Nick Walsh

1 February 2017 23	Partick Thistle	0 – 1	St Johnstone	Firhill Stadium
19:45	Edwards (yellow card) 70'; Elliott (red card) 90+2'	Report	MacLean 40'; Swanson (yellow card) 60'; Anderson (yellow card) 69'	Attendance: 2,257; Referee: (Scotland) Crawford Allan

5 February 2017 24	St Johnstone	2 – 5	Celtic	McDiarmid Park
12:30	Watson 31'; Boyata 43' (o.g.); Paton (yellow card) 58'; Foster (yellow card) 60'; Craig (yellow card) 90+3'	Report	Henderson 6'; Dembélé 61' (pen.) 75' 85'; Sinclair 81'; Lustig (yellow card) 90+3'	Attendance: 6,548; Referee: (Scotland) Craig Thomson

18 February 2017 25	Ross County	1 – 2	St Johnstone	Victoria Park
15:00	Curran 73'; O'Brien (yellow card) 76'	Report	McEveley 31' (o.g.); Kane 90+1'	Attendance: 3,187; Referee: (Scotland) John Beaton

25 February 2017 26	St Johnstone	0 – 2	Kilmarnock	McDiarmid Park
15:00	Kane (yellow card) 54'; Anderson (yellow card) 81'	Report	McKenzie 11'; Sammon 71'	Attendance: 2,933; Referee: (Scotland) Don Robertson

1 March 2017 27	Rangers	3 – 2	St Johnstone	Ibrox Stadium
19:45	McKay 22'; Waghorn 48'; Hyndman 90+1'; Kiernan (red card) 78'	Report	Wotherspoon 74'; Anderson 87'	Attendance: 46,800; Referee: (Scotland) Kevin Clancy

11 March 2017 28	St Johnstone	2 – 0	Dundee	McDiarmid Park
15:00	Paton 12'; Alston 19'; MacLean (yellow card) 89'	Report	O'Hara (yellow card) 26'; El Bakhtaoui (yellow card) 69'; Williams (yellow card) 84'	Attendance: 4,195; Referee: (Scotland) Andrew Dallas

18 March 2017 29	Motherwell	1 – 2	St Johnstone	Fir Park
15:00	McDonald 44'	Report	Craig 8' 66'; Davidson (yellow card) 78'	Attendance: 3,588; Referee: (Scotland) Greg Aitken

1 April 2017 30	Hamilton Academical	1 – 0	St Johnstone	New Douglas Park
15:00	Devlin (yellow card) 23'; Crawford (yellow card) 45+3'; D'Acol 89'	Report	Foster (red card) 45+3'; Swanson (red card) 45+3'; Cummins (yellow card) 83'	Attendance: 1,662; Referee: (Scotland) Don Robertson

5 April 2017 31	St Johnstone	1 – 0	Heart of Midlothian	McDiarmid Park
19:45	Shaughnessy 73'	Report	Nicholson (red card) 83'	Attendance: 4,197; Referee: Nick Walsh

8 April 2017 32	Inverness Caledonian Thistle	0 – 3	St Johnstone	Tulloch Caledonian Stadium
15:00	Cole (yellow card) 81' (yellow-red card)	Report	MacLean 40'; Alston (yellow card) 65'; Craig 88' (pen.); Cummins 90+1'	Attendance: 2,961; Referee: Stephen Finnie

15 April 2017 33	St Johnstone	1 – 2	Aberdeen	McDiarmid Park
15:00	Craig (yellow card) 22'; Swanson 48' (pen.); Wotherspoon (yellow card) 67'; MacLean (yellow card) 84'	Report	Christie 19'; Scobbie 32' (o.g.); Lewis (yellow card) 57'	Attendance: 5,132; Referee: Bobby Madden

29 April 2017 34	Aberdeen	1 – 2	St Johnstone	Pittodrie Stadium
15:00	Logan (yellow card) 18'; Hayes (yellow card) 19'; Stockley (yellow card) 90+3'	Report	Anderson (yellow card) 28'; Shaughnessy (yellow card) 33'; Swanson 80'; Thomson 80'; Craig (yellow card) 90+3'	Attendance: 10,606; Referee: Alan Muir

6 May 2017 35	Celtic	4 – 1	St Johnstone	Celtic Park
15:00	Roberts 47', 62'; Boyata 52'; McGregor 71'	Report	MacLean 49'	Attendance: 52,796; Referee: Nick Walsh

13 May 2017 36	St Johnstone	1 – 0	Partick Thistle	McDiarmid Park
15:00	Swanson 33' (pen.) (yellow card) 83'; MacLean (yellow card) 60'; Craig (yellow card) 67'	Report	Devine (yellow card) 17'; Edwards (yellow card) 24'; Elliott (yellow card) 82'	Attendance: 3,630; Referee: Stephen Finnie

17 May 2017 37	St Johnstone	1 – 0	Heart Of Midlothian	McDiarmid Park
19:45	Kane 26'	Report		Attendance: 3,141; Referee: Don Robertson

21 May 2017 38	St Johnstone	1 – 2	Rangers	McDiarmid Park
12:30	Cummins 76'	Report	Miller 40'; Toral 53'	Attendance: 6,799; Referee: Andrew Dallas

=== Scottish League Cup ===
==== Group B ====
Pos	Team	Pld	W	PW	PL	L	GF	GA	GD	Pts	Qualification	STJ	FAL	STI	BRE	ELG
1	St Johnstone (Q)	4	3	0	1	0	11	2	+9	10	Qualification to the Second Round	—	3–0	4–0	—	—
2	Falkirk (X)	4	2	0	0	2	5	4	+1	6	Possible Second Round as one of the 4 best runners up	—	—	—	2–0	3–0
3	Stirling Albion	4	2	0	0	2	6	7	−1	6		—	1–0	—	—	4–1
4	Brechin City	4	1	1	0	2	5	8	−3	5		1–1 (4–2 p)	—	2–1	—	—
5	Elgin City	4	1	0	0	3	6	12	−6	3		1–3	—	—	4–2	—

Updated to match(es) played on 30 July 2016. Source: BBC
(Q) Qualified; (X) Advances to Best runners-up

16 July 2016 Group B	Elgin City	1 – 3	St Johnstone	Borough Briggs, Elgin
15:00	Duff 48'; MacLeod (yellow card) 43'	BBC Report; SPFL Report	Swanson 16'; Cummins 71'; MacLean 79'	Attendance: 1,046; Referee: Alan Muir

23 July 2016 Group B	St Johnstone	3 – 0	Falkirk	McDiarmid Park, Perth
15:00	Swanson 25' (pen.), 38' (pen.); MacLean 68'; Craig (penalty missed) 16'	SPFL Report	Watson (yellow card) 24'	Attendance: 2,725; Referee: Bobby Madden

26 July 2016 Group B	Brechin City	1 – 1 (4–2 p)	St Johnstone	Glebe Park, Brechin
19:45	Jackson 35'; Graham (yellow card) 73'	SPFL Report	Kane 86'	Attendance: 912; Referee: John McKendrick
	Penalties
	Hill (penalty scored); Dyer (penalty scored); Graham (penalty missed); Trouten (penalty scored); Love (penalty scored)		(penalty scored) Swanson; (penalty missed) Kane; (penalty scored) Cummins; (penalty missed) Coulson

30 July 2016 Group B	St Johnstone	4 – 0	Stirling Albion	McDiarmid Park, Perth
15:00	Anderson 4'; MacLean 33'; Craig 43'; Wotherspoon 90+2'	SPFL Report	Ferns (yellow card) 56'; McKenzie (yellow card) 90+3'	Attendance: 2,858; Referee: Barry Cook

10 August 2016 Second Round	St Johnstone	3 – 2	Hearts	McDiarmid Park, Perth
19:45	Swanson 10' 75' (pen.); McKay 80'; Paton (yellow card) 45'; Swanson (yellow card) 71'; Alston (yellow card) 76'	SPFL Report	Paterson 43'; Walker 45' (pen.); Cowie (yellow card) 9'; Murihead (yellow card) 54'; Ozturk (yellow card) 74'; Rossi (yellow card) 81'	Attendance: 4,214; Referee: Crawford Allan

22 September 2016 Quarter final	Aberdeen	1 – 0	St Johnstone	Pittodrie Stadium, Aberdeen
19:45	Rooney 90'; Maddison (yellow card) 7'; Shinnie (yellow card) 34'	BBC Report; SPFL Report	Shaughnessy (yellow card) 11'; Wotherspoon (yellow card) 45'; Paton (yellow card) 51'; Swanson (yellow card) 67'; Davidson (yellow card) 80'	Attendance: 8,829; Referee: Craig Thomson (referee)

=== Scottish Cup ===
21 January 2017 Fourth Round	St Johnstone	2 – 0	Stenhousemuir	McDiarmid Park
15:00	MacLean 6'; Alston 32'	Report	Kerr (yellow card) 52'; McMenamin (yellow card) 64'; Ciaran Summers (yellow card) 82'	Attendance: 2,441; Referee: (Scotland) Euan Anderson

11 February 2017 Fifth Round	St Johnstone	0 – 1	Partick Thistle	McDiarmid Park
15:00	MacLean (yellow card) 40'; Swanson (yellow card) 75'	Report	Barton 7'; Welsh (yellow card) 65'; Devine (yellow card) 72'	Attendance: 2,884; Referee: (Scotland) Steven McLean

== Squad statistics ==
=== Appearances ===
As of 21 May 2017

No.	Pos	Nat	Player	Total		Premiership		League Cup		Scottish Cup	
No.	Pos	Nat	Player	Apps	Goals	Apps	Goals	Apps	Goals	Apps	Goals
1	GK	(Northern Ireland) NIR	Alan Mannus	17	0	12+2	0	3	0	0	0
2	DF	(Scotland) SCO	Dave Mackay	0	0	0	0	0	0	0	0
3	DF	(Scotland) SCO	Tam Scobbie	20	0	14+2	0	4	0	0	0
4	MF	(Scotland) SCO	Blair Alston	42	3	25+10	2	4+1	0	1+1	1
6	DF	(Scotland) SCO	Steven Anderson	34	4	26	3	6	1	2	0
7	MF	(Scotland) SCO	Chris Millar	22	0	14+3	0	3	0	2	0
8	MF	(Scotland) SCO	Murray Davidson	26	3	19+4	3	2	0	1	0
9	FW	(Scotland) SCO	Steven MacLean	39	12	30+2	9	4+1	2	2	1
10	MF	(Scotland) SCO	David Wotherspoon	38	2	20+13	1	2+1	1	2	0
11	MF	(Scotland) SCO	Danny Swanson	38	15	28+2	10	5+1	5	2	0
12	GK	(Scotland) SCO	Zander Clark	31	0	26	0	3	0	2	0
14	DF	(Republic of Ireland) IRL	Joe Shaughnessy	46	2	38	1	6	1	2	0
15	DF	(Wales) WAL	Clive Smith	2	0	2	0	0	0	0	0
17	FW	(Scotland) SCO	Michael Coulson	18	0	7+7	0	1+3	0	0	0
18	MF	(Northern Ireland) NIR	Paul Paton	34	1	22+6	1	3+3	0	0	0
19	DF	(Scotland) SCO	Richard Foster	34	1	33	1	0	0	1	0
22	DF	(Scotland) SCO	Keith Watson	6	1	3+1	1	1	0	1	0
24	DF	(Scotland) SCO	Brian Easton	45	0	37	0	6	0	2	0
25	FW	(Scotland) SCO	Chris Kane	32	6	14+11	5	2+3	1	0+2	0
26	MF	(Scotland) SCO	Liam Craig	44	6	27+9	5	5+1	1	0+2	0
27	MF	(Scotland) SCO	Craig Thomson	11	1	2+7	1	1+1	0	0	0
28	DF	(Scotland) SCO	Ally Gilchrist	0	0	0	0	0	0	0	0
29	FW	(Republic of Ireland) IRL	Graham Cummins	36	6	17+13	5	3+1	1	2	0
31	MF	(Scotland) SCO	Greg Hurst	1	0	0+1	0	0	0	0	0
33	FW	(Scotland) SCO	George Hunter	0	0	0	0	0	0	0	0
36	DF	(Scotland) SCO	Cameron Thompson	0	0	0	0	0	0	0	0
49	MF	(England) ENG	Daniel Jardine	0	0	0	0	0	0	0	0
Players who left the club during the 2016–17 season
15	DF	(Scotland) SCO	Brad McKay (joined Inverness Caledonian Thistle)	3	1	2	0	0+1	1	0	0
20	FW	(Northern Ireland) NIR	Joe Gormley (joined Cliftonville)	2	0	0+1	0	1	0	0	0
Players who left the club on loan during the 2016–17 season
23	DF	(Scotland) SCO	Liam Gordon (on loan to Peterhead)	1	0	0	0	1	0	0	0
32	MF	(Scotland) SCO	Connor McLaren (on loan to Stirling Albion)	0	0	0	0	0	0	0	0
39	DF	(Scotland) SCO	Aaron Comrie (on loan to Peterhead)	1	0	0+1	0	0	0	0	0

=== Goalscorers ===
As of 21 May 2017

Ranking	Nation	Number	Name	Scottish Premiership	League Cup	Scottish Cup	Total
1	(Scotland)	11	Danny Swanson	10	5	0	15
2	(Scotland)	10	Steven MacLean	9	2	1	12
3	(Scotland)	25	Chris Kane	5	1	0	6
3	(Scotland)	26	Liam Craig	5	1	0	6
3	(Republic of Ireland)	29	Graham Cummins	5	1	0	6
6	(Scotland)	10	Steven Anderson	3	1	0	4
7	(Scotland)	4	Blair Alston	2	0	1	3
7	(Scotland)	8	Murray Davidson	3	0	0	3
9	(Scotland)	10	David Wotherspoon	1	1	0	2
9	(Republic of Ireland)	14	Joe Shaughnessy	1	1	0	2
11	(Scotland)	15	Brad McKay	0	1	0	1
11	(Northern Ireland)	18	Paul Paton	1	0	0	1
11	(Scotland)	19	Richard Foster	1	0	0	1
11	(Scotland)	22	Keith Watson	1	0	0	1
11	(Scotland)	27	Craig Thomson	1	0	0	1
			Own goal	2	0	0	2
TOTALS				39	14	2	55

== Team statistics ==
=== League table ===
Pos	Team	Pld	W	D	L	GF	GA	GD	Pts	Qualification or relegation (Note: Teams played each other three times (33 matches), before the league split into two groups (the top six and the bottom six) for the last five matches.)
2	Aberdeen	38	24	4	10	74	35	+39	76	Qualification for the Europa League second qualifying round
3	Rangers	38	19	10	9	56	44	+12	67	Qualification for the Europa League first qualifying round
4	St Johnstone	38	17	7	14	50	46	+4	58	Qualification for the Europa League first qualifying round
5	Heart of Midlothian	38	12	10	16	55	52	+3	46	
6	Partick Thistle	38	10	12	16	38	54	−16	42	

Source: Scottish Premiership, Soccerway
Rules for classification: 1) Points; 2) Goal difference; 3) Goals scored; 4) Play-off (only if deciding champion, UEFA competitions qualification and second stage group allocation).

== Transfers ==
=== Players in ===
Date	Player	From	Fee
3 May 2016	(Scotland) Keith Watson	(Scotland) St Mirren	Free
26 May 2016	(Scotland) Blair Alston	(Scotland) Falkirk	Free
7 June 2016	(Northern Ireland) Paul Paton	(Scotland) Dundee United	Free
1 July 2016	(England) Michael Coulson	(England) York City	Free
1 July 2016	(Northern Ireland) Joe Gormley	(England) Peterborough United	Loan
19 August 2016	(Scotland) Richard Foster	(Scotland) Ross County	Free
31 January 2017	(Wales) Clive Smith	(England) Preston North End	Loan

=== Players out ===
Date	Player	To	Fee
9 June 2016	(Scotland) Neil Martyniuk	(Scotland) Edinburgh City	Free
28 June 2016	(England) John Sutton	(Scotland) St Mirren	Free
13 July 2016	(Scotland) Gareth Rodger	(Scotland) Brechin City	Free
31 August 2016	(Scotland) Brad McKay	(Scotland) Inverness Caledonian Thistle	Free
15 September 2016	(Scotland) Dave Mackay	Retired	
4 January 2017	(Scotland) Aaron Comrie	(Scotland) Peterhead	Loan
4 January 2017	(Scotland) Liam Gordon	(Scotland) Peterhead	Loan
6 January 2017	(Scotland) Connor McLaren	(Scotland) Stirling Albion	Loan

== See also ==
- List of St Johnstone F.C. seasons
