= 2006–07 Sheffield Wednesday F.C. season =

English football club season

Sheffield Wednesday
2006–07 season
- Chairman: Dave Allen
- Manager: Paul Sturrock (until 19 October); Sean McAuley (caretaker until 6 November); Brian Laws (from 6 November)
- Stadium: Hillsborough
- Championship: 9th
- FA Cup: Third round
- League Cup: First round
- Top goalscorer: League: Burton (13); All: Burton/MacLean (13)
- Average home league attendance: 23,638

During the 2006–07 English football season, Sheffield Wednesday F.C. competed in the Football League Championship.

== Season summary ==
In the 2006-07 season, manager Paul Sturrock was sacked after Sheffield Wednesday's slow start. He was replaced by former Scunthorpe United boss Brian Laws. They finished ninth in the Championship that season, just four points short of the play-offs.

== Final league table ==
Pos	Team	Pld	W	D	L	GF	GA	GD	Pts
7	Preston North End	46	22	8	16	64	53	+11	74
8	Stoke City	46	19	16	11	62	41	+21	73
9	Sheffield Wednesday	46	20	11	15	70	66	+4	71
10	Colchester United	46	20	9	17	70	56	+14	69
11	Plymouth Argyle	46	17	16	13	63	62	+1	67

Source: RSSSF
Rules for classification: In the Football League goals scored (F) takes precedence over goal difference (GD).

== Results ==
Sheffield Wednesday's score comes first

=== Legend ===
Win	Draw	Loss

=== Football League Championship ===
Date	Opponent	Venue	Result	Attendance	Scorers
5 August 2006	Preston North End	A	0–0	15,650	
8 August 2006	Luton Town	H	0–1	22,613	
12 August 2006	Burnley	H	1–1	22,425	MacLean (pen)
19 August 2006	Plymouth Argyle	A	2–1	14,507	McAllister, O'Brien
27 August 2006	Leeds United	H	0–1	23,792	
9 September 2006	Southend United	A	0–0	9,639	
12 September 2006	Stoke City	H	1–1	19,966	Brunt (pen)
15 September 2006	Hull City	A	1–2	17,685	Burton (pen)
23 September 2006	Derby County	H	1–2	23,659	Brunt
30 September 2006	Sunderland	A	0–1	36,764	
14 October 2006	Barnsley	H	2–1	28,687	Whelan, Brunt
18 October 2006	Colchester United	A	0–4	5,097	
21 October 2006	Queens Park Rangers	H	3–2	23,813	Tudgay (2), MacLean (pen)
28 October 2006	Wolverhampton Wanderers	A	2–2	20,637	Small, Brunt
31 October 2006	Crystal Palace	H	3–2	19,034	Tudgay, Coughlan, MacLean
4 November 2006	Leicester City	H	2–1	22,451	Tudgay (2)
11 November 2006	Ipswich Town	A	2–0	21,830	Tudgay, Bougherra
18 November 2006	Coventry City	A	1–3	19,489	Brunt
25 November 2006	Cardiff City	H	0–0	23,935	
28 November 2006	West Bromwich Albion	H	3–1	21,695	Whelan, Bougherra, MacLean (pen)
2 December 2006	Leicester City	A	4–1	22,693	Brunt (2, 1 pen), Whelan, Tudgay
9 December 2006	Norwich City	A	2–1	24,816	Camp (own goal), Burton
16 December 2006	Birmingham City	H	0–3	26,083	
23 December 2006	Southampton	H	3–3	23,739	Whelan (2), Crossley
26 December 2006	Stoke City	A	2–1	23,003	MacLean, Burton
30 December 2006	Barnsley	A	3–0	21,253	Andrews, Brunt, MacLean
1 January 2007	Hull City	H	1–2	28,600	Burton
13 January 2007	Derby County	A	0–1	28,936	
20 January 2007	Sunderland	H	2–4	29,103	Burton, Small
31 January 2007	Southampton	A	1–2	20,230	MacLean
3 February 2007	Preston North End	H	1–3	22,441	Burton
10 February 2007	Burnley	A	1–1	12,745	Burton
20 February 2007	Luton Town	A	2–3	8,011	Burton, Whelan
24 February 2007	Southend United	H	3–2	24,116	Tudgay, Prior (own goal), MacLean (pen)
3 March 2007	Leeds United	A	3–2	25,297	Tudgay, Brunt, Johnson
6 March 2007	Plymouth Argyle	H	1–1	19,449	MacLean
10 March 2007	Queens Park Rangers	A	1–1	15,188	Brunt
13 March 2007	Colchester United	H	2–0	18,752	Simek, Mills (own goal)
17 March 2007	Wolverhampton Wanderers	H	2–2	24,181	Burton, MacLean
31 March 2007	Crystal Palace	A	2–1	21,523	Burton, Tudgay
7 April 2007	Cardiff City	A	2–1	13,621	Clarke, Burton
9 April 2007	Ipswich Town	H	2–0	23,232	Whelan, MacLean
13 April 2007	West Bromwich Albion	A	1–0	20,415	Burton
21 April 2007	Coventry City	H	2–1	23,632	Tudgay, MacLean
28 April 2007	Birmingham City	A	0–2	29,317	
6 May 2007	Norwich City	H	3–2	28,287	Johnson, Burton, Etuhu (own goal)

=== FA Cup ===
Round	Date	Opponent	Venue	Result	Attendance	Goalscorers
R3	7 January 2007	Manchester City	H	1–1	28,487	MacLean
R3R	16 January 2007	Manchester City	A	1–2	25,621	Bullen

=== League Cup ===
Round	Date	Opponent	Venue	Result	Attendance	Goalscorers
R1	23 August 2006	Wrexham	H	1–4	8,047	Whelan

== Squad ==
Note: Flags indicate national team as defined under FIFA eligibility rules; some limited exceptions apply. Players may hold more than one non-FIFA nationality.

No.	Pos.	Nation	Player
1	GK	WAL	Mark Crossley (on loan from Fulham)
2	DF	SCO	Lee Bullen
3	DF	WAL	Peter Gilbert
4	MF	ENG	Kenny Lunt
5	DF	IRL	Graham Coughlan
6	MF	IRL	Glenn Whelan
7	MF	ENG	Marcus Tudgay
8	MF	SCO	Burton O'Brien
9	FW	SCO	Steve MacLean
10	FW	JAM	Deon Burton
11	MF	NIR	Chris Brunt
12	MF	ENG	Steve Adams
14	DF	ENG	John Hills
15	MF	ENG	Wade Small
16	DF	ENG	Richard Wood
18	FW	ENG	Leon Clarke

No.	Pos.	Nation	Player
20	DF	USA	Frank Simek
22	GK	ENG	Chris Adamson
23	MF	JAM	Jermaine Johnson
24	DF	ENG	Mark Beevers
25	MF	NOR	Rocky Lekaj
26	FW	IRL	Barry Corr
27	MF	ENG	Luke Boden
28	MF	NIR	Dave McClements
29	GK	ENG	Richard O'Donnell
30	FW	SCO	David Graham
31	MF	TOG	Yoann Folly
32	DF	ENG	Tommy Spurr
33	MF	ENG	Sean McAllister
34	FW	ENG	Matt Bowman
35	DF	NIR	Liam McMenamin

=== Left club during season ===
Note: Flags indicate national team as defined under FIFA eligibility rules; some limited exceptions apply. Players may hold more than one non-FIFA nationality.

No.	Pos.	Nation	Player
1	GK	AUS	Brad Jones (on loan from Middlesbrough)
17	MF	ENG	Lloyd Sam (on loan from Charlton Athletic)
17	FW	ENG	Wayne Andrews (on loan from Coventry City)
17	DF	ENG	Steve Watson (on loan from West Bromwich Albion)
19	GK	ENG	Shwan Jalal (on loan from Woking)

No.	Pos.	Nation	Player
19	GK	SCO	Iain Turner (on loan from Everton)
21	DF	ALG	Madjid Bougherra (to Charlton Athletic)
23	DF	NIR	Rory McArdle (to Rochdale)
25	FW	ENG	Drew Talbot (to Luton Town)

== Transfers ==
=== In ===
- (France) Yoann Folly - (England) Southampton
- (England) Leon Clarke - (England) Wolves, nominal
- (Jamaica) Jermaine Johnson - (England) Bradford City, £500,000

=== Out ===
- (England) Patrick Collins - (England) Darlington, free
- (Guinea) Drissa Diallo - (England) MK Dons, free
- (Grenada) Craig Rocastle - (England) Oldham Athletic, free
- (Scotland) Jon-Paul McGovern - (England) MK Dons, free
- (England) Ben Kirby - (England) Boston United, free
- (Northern Ireland) Rory McArdle - (England) Rochdale, nominal
- (England) Drew Talbot - (England) Luton Town, £250,000
- (Algeria) Madjid Bougherra - (England) Charlton Athletic, £2,500,000
