= Richard Foster (Scottish footballer) =

Scottish footballer (born 1985)

Personal information
- Full name: Richard Martyn Foster
- Date of birth: 31 July 1985 (age 41)
- Place of birth: Elgin, Scotland
- Height: 1.79 m (5 ft 10 in)
- Position: Right-back

Youth career
- Elgin Boys Club
- 2001–2003: Aberdeen

Senior career*
| Years | Team | Apps | (Gls) |
| 2003–2012 | Aberdeen | 234 | (8) |
| 2010–2011 | → Rangers (loan) | 15 | (0) |
| 2012–2013 | Bristol City | 50 | (0) |
| 2013–2015 | Rangers | 38 | (0) |
| 2015–2016 | Ross County | 33 | (0) |
| 2016–2019 | St Johnstone | 96 | (1) |
| 2019–2020 | Ross County | 20 | (0) |
| 2020–2022 | Partick Thistle | 47 | (0) |
| 2022 | Detroit City | 5 | (0) |
| Total | | 542 | (9) |

International career
| 2004–2006 | Scotland U21 | 3 | (0) |

Managerial career
- 2023–2025: Motherwell U18s
- * Club domestic league appearances and goals

Richard Martyn Foster (born 31 July 1985) is a Scottish football coach and former professional footballer. He played for Aberdeen, Rangers, Bristol City, St Johnstone, Ross County, Partick Thistle and Detroit City. He was made Captain of Aberdeen by then manager Craig Brown.

Foster primarily played as a right back, although he was a versatile player; goalkeeper is the only position in which he never played. He played over 600 games before moving into coaching in 2022.

He worked as Head of Academy Coaching and also managed the Under-18 side at Motherwell from 2023 to 2025. In November 2025, he became assistant to Jon Daly at League of Ireland Premier Division club Waterford. He left Waterford on 2nd May 2026 after Daly was relieved of his duties following a poor start to the season.

== Early life ==
Foster was born in Elgin, Moray to Martyn and Carol Foster (née Cruickshank). He was a Rangers fan as a boy.

== Club career ==
=== Aberdeen ===
Foster made his debut for Aberdeen aged 17 on 10 May 2003 in a Scottish Premier League match against Partick Thistle, coming on as a substitute for Darren Mackie. He scored his first goal for the club almost exactly a year later during a 2–1 league defeat to Dundee on 15 May 2004. Foster became a first team regular under Jimmy Calderwood and signed a two-year contract extension on 31 July 2007.

Although naturally a right winger, Foster made significant progress playing in the left back position during the 2007–08 season, impressing with his man-marking performances when Aberdeen's first-choice left back Richie Byrne was injured. On 20 September 2007, he made his European debut in the first leg of Aberdeen's UEFA Cup first round tie against Dnipro, coming on as a 72nd-minute substitute for Jackie McNamara as the game ended 0–0. Foster started at left back in the return match in Ukraine on 4 October and provided the assist for Darren Mackie's opening goal, sending in the cross for the striker to head home from close range. Despite Dnipro salvaging a 1–1 draw, Aberdeen progressed to the group stages of the tournament on away goals. On 20 December, Foster scored the first European goal of his career in Aberdeen's 4–0 UEFA Cup group stage win over Copenhagen. The result put the Dons through to the last 32, where they lost 7–3 on aggregate to Bayern Munich (drawing the first leg 2–2 at Pittodrie and losing 5–1 in the second leg at the Allianz Arena).

In February 2009, Foster was involved in a training ground bust-up with Calderwood which led to him being omitted from the Aberdeen squad to face Dundee United on 21 February, after he called the then Dons manager "stupid".

Despite criticism from some supporters, upon Foster's return to Aberdeen he was appointed as Paul Hartley's successor as Aberdeen captain for the 2011–12 season.

==== Rangers (loan) ====
On 31 August 2010, Foster moved on a season-long loan to SPL champions Rangers, with Gers striker Andrius Velička moving in the opposite direction. He was given the number 12 shirt and made his Rangers debut on 11 September, coming on as a substitute for Kirk Broadfoot in a 2–1 victory over Hamilton Accies. Foster made his first Rangers start on 20 October in a Champions League group stage match against Valencia at Ibrox, where he was selected as man of the match despite missing an open goal.

Many of Foster's Rangers appearances came in the Champions League and Europa League. He played at right back in a 2–2 draw with Sporting Clube de Portugal in the second leg of the Europa League last 32, as Rangers won with the away goal rule coming into play. He was involved in an Old Firm match against Celtic on 2 March 2011, where the 1–0 defeat was overshadowed by scenes at the conclusion of the match. Foster's European run continued in the last 16 first leg against PSV Eindhoven on 10 March, which ended 0–0. He finished the SPL season with a winner's medal, having made enough appearances to contribute to Rangers' title success. However he was cup-tied for their victorious 2010–11 Scottish League Cup campaign after being an unused substitute for Aberdeen against Alloa Athletic earlier in the season.

=== Bristol City ===
On 6 January 2012 he signed for Championship side Bristol City on a two-and-a-half-year contract for an undisclosed fee.

=== Rangers ===
Foster signed for Rangers on a two-year contract in June 2013.

=== Ross County ===
After being released by Rangers, Foster signed a two-year contract with Scottish Premiership club Ross County in June 2015. He picked up a winners' medal in the 2015–16 Scottish League Cup as Ross County beat Hibernian 2–1.

=== St Johnstone ===
On 19 August 2016, Foster signed for St Johnstone, agreeing a contract until the end of the 2016–17 season. He scored his first goal for St Johnstone against Inverness Caledonian Thistle on 27 August 2016. In April 2017, Foster brought St Johnstone in to disrepute after becoming involved in an on-pitch brawl with teammate Danny Swanson. Both players were suspended by the club and were subsequently fined four weeks' wages.

In February 2019, Foster signed an extension to his contract with St Johnstone, which was due to run until the summer of 2020. In August 2019 Foster was involved in an incident with manager Tommy Wright on the training pitch and was dropped from the first-team.

=== Return to Ross County ===
Foster left St Johnstone in August 2019 and returned to Ross County on a one-year contract. On 25 May 2020, Foster was released from his contract criticising the chairman for not taking advantage of the government's furlough scheme, calling it "morally shocking".

=== Partick Thistle ===
After leaving Ross County, Foster signed a one-year deal with then Scottish League One side Partick Thistle. After winning the League One title with Thistle, Foster signed a one-year contract extension with the club.

=== Detroit City ===
In August 2022, Foster signed as a player-coach with USL Championship side Detroit City FC. On 4 February 2023, Detroit City announced that Foster would not be returning to the club for the 2023 season.

== International career ==
Foster was selected by the Scotland national under-21 football team. He was selected for the full Scotland squad in February 2012, but he did not play in the friendly with Slovenia. Foster said in November 2018 that he was disappointed that he had not been recalled, given the lack of options in his preferred position.

== Personal life ==
Foster began dating Scottish singer Amy Macdonald in 2015 and the couple were engaged on New Year's Eve that year. They got married in Las Vegas in 2018.

Foster did a psychology degree at the Open University and has also written a crime novel.

== Coaching career ==
Having spent the second half of 2022 as a player-coach of USL Championship side Detroit City, he returned to Scotland in early 2023, where he became Head of Academy Coaching at Scottish Premiership club Motherwell, where he also managed the club's Under-18 side before leaving the role in October 2025.

On 20 November 2025, it was announced that Foster had been made assistant manager of League of Ireland Premier Division club Waterford under newly appointed manager Jon Daly who was a teammate of his from during their playing careers.

== Career statistics ==
Appearances and goals by club, season and competition
| Club | Season | League | | | National Cup | | League Cup | | Other | | Total | |
| Club | Season | Division | Apps | Goals | Apps | Goals | Apps | Goals | Apps | Goals | Apps | Goals |
|---|---|---|---|---|---|---|---|---|---|---|---|---|
| Aberdeen | 2002–03 | Scottish Premier League | 2 | 0 | 0 | 0 | 0 | 0 | 0 | 0 | 2 | 0 |
| Aberdeen | 2003–04 | Scottish Premier League | 18 | 1 | 3 | 0 | 0 | 0 | — | | 21 | 1 |
| Aberdeen | 2004–05 | Scottish Premier League | 25 | 1 | 1 | 0 | 1 | 0 | — | | 27 | 1 |
| Aberdeen | 2005–06 | Scottish Premier League | 25 | 1 | 2 | 0 | 1 | 0 | — | | 28 | 1 |
| Aberdeen | 2006–07 | Scottish Premier League | 37 | 3 | 2 | 0 | 1 | 0 | — | | 40 | 3 |
| Aberdeen | 2007–08 | Scottish Premier League | 33 | 1 | 5 | 0 | 3 | 0 | 7 (Note: Appearances in the UEFA Cup) | 1 | 48 | 2 |
| Aberdeen | 2008–09 | Scottish Premier League | 34 | 0 | 4 | 0 | 2 | 0 | — | | 40 | 0 |
| Aberdeen | 2009–10 | Scottish Premier League | 37 | 0 | 2 | 0 | 1 | 0 | 2 (Note: Appearances in the Europa League) | 0 | 42 | 0 |
| Aberdeen | 2010–11 | Scottish Premier League | 1 | 0 | 0 | 0 | 0 | 0 | — | | 1 | 0 |
| Aberdeen | 2011–12 | Scottish Premier League | 22 | 1 | 0 | 0 | 2 | 0 | — | | 24 | 1 |
| Aberdeen | Total | | 234 | 8 | 19 | 0 | 11 | 0 | 9 | 1 | 273 | 9 |
| Rangers (loan) | 2010–11 | Scottish Premier League | 15 | 0 | 2 | 0 | 0 | 0 | 7 (Note: Three appearances in the Champions League and four in the UEFA Cup) | 0 | 24 | 0 |
| Bristol City | 2011–12 | Championship | 20 | 0 | 0 | 0 | 0 | 0 | — | | 20 | 0 |
| Bristol City | 2012–13 | Championship | 30 | 0 | 0 | 0 | 1 | 0 | — | | 31 | 0 |
| Bristol City | Total | | 50 | 0 | 0 | 0 | 1 | 0 | 0 | 0 | 51 | 0 |
| Rangers | 2013–14 | Scottish League One | 23 | 0 | 4 | 0 | 0 | 0 | 3 (Note: Appearances in the Scottish Challenge Cup) | 0 | 30 | 0 |
| Rangers | 2014–15 | Scottish Championship | 15 | 0 | 3 | 0 | 2 | 0 | 9 (Note: Three appearances in the Scottish Challenge Cup and six in the Premiership play-offs) | 0 | 29 | 0 |
| Rangers | Total | | 38 | 0 | 7 | 0 | 2 | 0 | 12 | 0 | 59 | 0 |
| Ross County | 2015–16 | Scottish Premiership | 32 | 0 | 4 | 0 | 4 | 0 | — | | 40 | 0 |
| Ross County | 2016–17 | Scottish Premiership | 1 | 0 | 0 | 0 | 2 | 0 | — | | 3 | 0 |
| Ross County | Total | | 33 | 0 | 4 | 0 | 6 | 0 | 0 | 0 | 43 | 0 |
| St Johnstone | 2016–17 | Scottish Premiership | 33 | 1 | 1 | 0 | 0 | 0 | — | | 34 | 1 |
| St Johnstone | 2017–18 | Scottish Premiership | 24 | 0 | 1 | 0 | 1 | 0 | 2 | 0 | 28 | 0 |
| St Johnstone | 2018–19 | Scottish Premiership | 37 | 0 | 2 | 0 | 6 | 0 | — | | 45 | 0 |
| St Johnstone | 2019–20 | Scottish Premiership | 2 | 0 | 0 | 0 | 3 | 0 | — | | 5 | 0 |
| St Johnstone | Total | | 96 | 1 | 4 | 0 | 10 | 0 | 2 | 0 | 112 | 1 |
| Ross County | 2019–20 | Scottish Premiership | 20 | 0 | 1 | 0 | 0 | 0 | — | | 21 | 0 |
| Partick Thistle | 2020–21 | Scottish League One | 20 | 0 | 1 | 0 | 3 | 0 | — | | 24 | 0 |
| Partick Thistle | 2021–22 | Scottish Championship | 26 | 0 | 0 | 0 | 4 | 0 | — | | 34 | 0 |
| Partick Thistle | Total | | 46 | 0 | 1 | 0 | 7 | 0 | 0 | 0 | 58 | 0 |
| Detroit City | 2022 | USL Championship | 5 | 0 | — | | — | | 0 | 0 | 5 | 0 |
| Career total | | | 537 | 9 | 38 | 0 | 37 | 0 | 37 | 1 | 649 | 10 |

== Honours ==
Rangers

- Scottish Premier League: 2010–11
- Scottish League One: 2013–14

Ross County

- Scottish League Cup: 2015–16

Partick Thistle

- Scottish League One: 2020–21
