= Liam Gordon (footballer, born 1996) =

Scottish footballer

Personal information
- Full name: Liam Craig Gordon
- Date of birth: 26 January 1996 (age 30)
- Place of birth: Perth, Scotland
- Position: Centre-back

Team information
- Current team: Gillingham
- Number: 4

Youth career
- Dundee
- Raith Rovers
- Heart of Midlothian

Senior career*
Years	Team	Apps	(Gls)
2014–2015	Heart of Midlothian	0	(0)
2015	→ Arbroath (loan)	10	(0)
2015–2024	St Johnstone	143	(11)
2015	→ Elgin City (loan)	12	(0)
2017	→ Peterhead (loan)	7	(0)
2024–2026	Motherwell	44	(2)
2026–	Gillingham	1	(0)
- * Club domestic league appearances and goals as of 21:15, 31 August 2026 (UTC)

Liam Craig Gordon (born 26 January 1996) is a Scottish professional footballer who plays as a defender for EFL League Two club Gillingham.

== Career ==
Gordon spent his early career with Dundee and Raith Rovers before signing for Hearts on a three-year contract; he began his senior career on loan at Arbroath during the 2014–15 season.

He signed for St Johnstone in 2015, moving on loan to Elgin City shortly afterwards. He made his debut for St Johnstone in May 2016, starting in a 2–2 draw against Hearts.

In January 2017, Gordon, along with fellow Saints defender Aaron Comrie, moved on loan to Scottish League One side Peterhead until the end of the 2016–17 season.

In July 2019, Gordon was ruled out for up to six weeks after he fractured his elbow in training. on 6 December 2020, he captained St Johnstone for the first time, in a 1–1 draw away to Celtic.

On 24 June 2024, Gordon joined Motherwell on a two-year deal upon the expiration of his contract with St Johnstone.

On 19 June 2026, Gordon agreed to join EFL League Two club Gillingham on a two-year deal. He was named club captain ahead of the first league game of the 2026–27 season.

== Career statistics ==
As of end of 2025–26 season

Appearances and goals by club, season and competition
Club	Season	League			Scottish Cup		League Cup		Other		Total	
Club	Season	Division	Apps	Goals	Apps	Goals	Apps	Goals	Apps	Goals	Apps	Goals
Heart of Midlothian	2014–15	Scottish Championship	0	0	0	0	1	0	1 (Note: Appearances in the Scottish Challenge Cup)	0	2	0
Arbroath (loan)	2014–15	Scottish League Two	10	0	1	0	0	0	2 (Note: Appearances in the League One play-offs)	0	13	0
St Johnstone	2015–16	Scottish Premiership	1	0	0	0	0	0	0	0	1	0
St Johnstone	2016–17	Scottish Premiership	0	0	0	0	1	0	—		1	0
St Johnstone	2017–18	Scottish Premiership	7	0	1	0	0	0	0	0	8	0
St Johnstone	2018–19	Scottish Premiership	13	0	0	0	4	0	—		17	0
St Johnstone	2019–20	Scottish Premiership	16	0	2	0	0	0	1 (Note: Appearance as an over-age player for St Johnstone under-21s in the Scottish Challenge Cup in which age-restricted sides from the Scottish Premiership clubs compete against senior clubs.)	0	19	0
St Johnstone	2020–21	Scottish Premiership	36	1	5	0	7	0	—		48	1
St Johnstone	2021–22	Scottish Premiership	12	1	0	0	1	0	3 (Note: One Appearance in the UEFA Europa League and two appearances in the UEFA Conference League)	0	16	1
St Johnstone	2022–23	Scottish Premiership	32	2	1	0	0	0	1	0	34	2
St Johnstone	2023–24	Scottish Premiership	32	0	1	0	4	0	0	0	37	0
St Johnstone	Total		149	4	10	0	17	0	5	0	181	4
Elgin City (loan)	2015–16	Scottish League Two	12	0	0	0	1	0	3	0	16	0
Peterhead (loan)	2016–17	Scottish League One	7	0	0	0	0	0	4 (Note: Appearances in the League One play-offs)	0	11	0
Motherwell	2024–25	Scottish Premiership	27	1	0	0	6	0	0	0	33	1
Motherwell	2025–26	Scottish Premiership	17	1	2	0	5	0	0	0	24	1
Motherwell	Total		44	2	2	0	11	0	0	0	57	2
Career total			222	6	13	0	30	0	15	0	280	6

== Honours ==
St Johnstone

- Scottish Cup: 2020–21
- Scottish League Cup: 2020–21
