= Graham Cummins =

Footballer

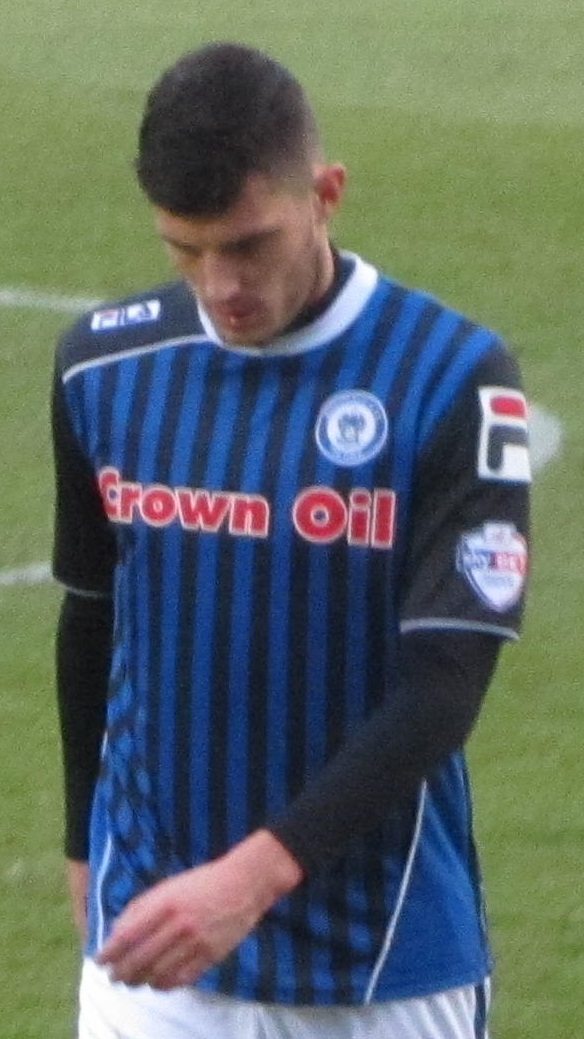
- Cummins in 2013

Personal information
- Full name: Graham Rickard Cummins
- Date of birth: 29 December 1987 (age 38)
- Place of birth: Cork, Ireland
- Positions: Forward; defender

Youth career
- Tramore Athletic
- College Corinthians

Senior career*
| Years | Team | Apps | (Gls) |
| 2006–2008 | Cobh Ramblers | 77 | (17) |
| 2009 | Waterford United | 28 | (17) |
| 2010–2011 | Cork City | 62 | (42) |
| 2012–2014 | Preston North End | 34 | (4) |
| 2013–2014 | → Rochdale (loan) | 27 | (4) |
| 2014–2015 | Exeter City | 34 | (7) |
| 2015–2017 | St Johnstone | 77 | (14) |
| 2017–2019 | Cork City | 52 | (18) |
| 2019 | → Shamrock Rovers (loan) | 8 | (3) |
| 2020 | Waterford | 2 | (0) |
| 2020 | Cork City | 0 | (0) |
| Total | | 401 | (126) |

International career
| 2010 | Republic of Ireland U23 | 1 | (0) |
- * Club domestic league appearances and goals

Graham Rickard Cummins (born 29 December 1987) is an Irish former professional footballer who played as a forward or defender.

== Career ==
=== Early career ===
Cummins played the majority of his schoolboy football with Tramore Athletic and also had a spell with College Corinthians.

=== Cobh Ramblers ===
Cummins joined Cobh Ramblers in 2006 and achieved promotion with them in his second season under Stephen Henderson. He scored 11 league goals as Cobh won the First Division, and he was named in the PFAI First Division Team of the Year. He continued to play for Cobh in the Premier Division in 2008, but they were relegated that year.

=== Waterford United ===
After Cobh were relegated from the league the following season, Cummins moved onto Waterford United, where he again linked up with Stephen Henderson, former Cobh Ramblers manager. He won the Munster Senior Cup with Waterford that year. Graham enjoyed great personal success in his first and only season with the club, he became one of the club's top scorers, scoring 17 league goals, and he was named in the PFAI First Division Team of the Year for the second time in his career.

=== Cork City ===
In March 2010 Cummins signed for his local club Cork City. Graham was called up to the Ireland U23 squad versus Estonia in September 2010. He played the full 90 minutes in a 1–0 away win. In October 2010 Graham was named in the PFAI First Division Team of the Year and won the PFAI First Division Player of the Year award. He finished the season as City's top scorer, and joint top scorer in the First Division with 18 league goals. Graham scored his first hat-trick for City in a 5–0 league win over Finn Harps on 15 April 2011. He scored the winner against St.Pats in the quarter final of the Ea sports cup.

==== Record Breaker ====
On 4 October 2011, in a game against Monaghan, Cummins scored his 21st goal of the season, becoming the first ever Cork City player to score more than 20 league goals in a season. The previous record was held by Pat Morley (who is a first cousin of Grahams mother, Susan Morley and son of the late Jack Morley ex West Ham), who had on two occasions scored 20 league goals in a season. He went on to score 24 goals that season including the goal that clinched the First Division title for Cork City away to rivals Shelbourne in the 94th minute of the final game of the season at Tolka Park

=== Preston North End ===
On 30 January 2012, Cork City announced that they had accepted a transfer bid for Cummins from Preston North End.

On 2 September 2013, Cummins signed for Rochdale on loan until January 2014.

=== Exeter City ===
On 15 August 2014, Cummins signed a one-year contract with Exeter City on a free transfer following his release from Preston North End. Cummins made his debut in the 3–0 defeat at Home Park, coming on as a substitute. He was released at the end of the 2014–15 season

=== St Johnstone ===
On 25 May 2015, Cummins signed a one-year contract with St Johnstone of the Scottish Premiership, and began his Saints career by scoring off the bench on his debut against Hearts at Tynecastle in a 4–3 defeat. Cummins made 92 appearances for St Johnstone, scoring 15 goals. His last goal for the club was in a win against Rangers at Ibrox.

=== Return to Ireland ===
Cummins signed for City on a two-year deal on 30 December 2017. He scored for City in a 4–2 win on his first competitive start against Dundalk in the 2018 President's Cup at Oriel Park. On his first start in the league against St. Pat's on the opening night of the season, Cummins scored City's second goal of the night but was later sent off in a 3–2 away victory. On his return from suspension, Cummins scored a hat-trick as City beat Sligo Rovers 4–1 away from home.

Cummins joined Waterford ahead of the 2020 season where he featured as a centre-half before COVID-19 halted the season for nearly five months. Before the season's resumption, he joined Cork City for a third time. He was an unused substitute in two league games and received a red card in a FAI Cup game against Longford Town. In September, he announced his retirement to pursue a career in journalism.

== Career statistics ==
As of 5 October 2020.

Appearances and goals by club, season and competition
| Club | Season | League | | | National cup | | League cup | | Europe | | Other | | Total | |
| Club | Season | Division | Apps | Goals | Apps | Goals | Apps | Goals | Apps | Goals | Apps | Goals | Apps | Goals |
|---|---|---|---|---|---|---|---|---|---|---|---|---|---|---|
| Cobh Ramblers | 2006 | League of Ireland First Division | | | | | | | — | | | | | |
| Cobh Ramblers | 2007 | League of Ireland First Division | | | | | | | — | | | | | |
| Cobh Ramblers | 2008 | League of Ireland First Division | | | | | | | — | | | | | |
| Cobh Ramblers | Total | | 77 | 17 | | | | | — | | | | 77 | 17 |
| Waterford | 2009 | League of Ireland First Division | 28 | 17 | | | | | — | | | | 28 | 17 |
| Cork City | 2010 | League of Ireland First Division | 32 | 18 | 0 | 0 | 0 | 0 | — | | 0 | 0 | 32 | 18 |
| Cork City | 2011 | League of Ireland First Division | 30 | 24 | 2 | 0 | 3 | 2 | — | | 0 | 0 | 35 | 26 |
| Cork City | Total | | 62 | 42 | 2 | 0 | 3 | 2 | 0 | 0 | 0 | 0 | 67 | 44 |
| Preston North End | 2011–12 | League One | 15 | 2 | 0 | 0 | 0 | 0 | — | | 0 | 0 | 15 | 2 |
| Preston North End | 2012–13 | League One | 19 | 2 | 1 | 0 | 1 | 0 | — | | 3 | 1 | 24 | 3 |
| Preston North End | 2013–14 | League One | 0 | 0 | 0 | 0 | 0 | 0 | — | | 0 | 0 | 0 | 0 |
| Preston North End | Total | | 34 | 4 | 1 | 0 | 1 | 0 | — | | 3 | 1 | 39 | 5 |
| Rochdale (loan) | 2013–14 | League Two | 27 | 4 | 2 | 0 | 0 | 0 | — | | 2 | 0 | 31 | 4 |
| Exeter City | 2014–15 | League Two | 34 | 7 | 1 | 0 | 0 | 0 | — | | 0 | 0 | 35 | 7 |
| St Johnstone | 2015–16 | Scottish Premiership | 32 | 8 | 1 | 0 | 2 | 0 | 1 | 0 | — | | 36 | 8 |
| St Johnstone | 2016–17 | Scottish Premiership | 30 | 5 | 2 | 0 | 4 | 1 | — | | — | | 36 | 6 |
| St Johnstone | 2017–18 | Scottish Premiership | 15 | 1 | 0 | 0 | 1 | 0 | 2 | 0 | — | | 18 | 1 |
| St Johnstone | Total | | 77 | 14 | 3 | 0 | 7 | 1 | 3 | 0 | — | | 90 | 15 |
| Cork City | 2018 | League of Ireland Premier Division | 34 | 13 | 3 | 1 | 1 | 0 | 3 | 0 | 2 | 3 | 43 | 17 |
| Cork City | 2019 | League of Ireland Premier Division | 18 | 5 | — | | 1 | 0 | — | | 3 | 0 | 22 | 5 |
| Cork City | Total | | 52 | 18 | 3 | 1 | 2 | 0 | 3 | 0 | 5 | 3 | 65 | 22 |
| Shamrock Rovers (loan) | 2019 | League of Ireland Premier Division | 8 | 3 | 2 | 0 | — | | 2 | 0 | 0 | 0 | 12 | 3 |
| Waterford | 2020 | League of Ireland Premier Division | 2 | 0 | — | | — | | — | | — | | 2 | 0 |
| Cork City | 2020 | League of Ireland Premier Division | 0 | 0 | 1 | 0 | — | | — | | — | | 1 | 0 |
| Career total | | | 401 | 126 | 15 | 1 | 13 | 3 | 8 | 0 | 10 | 4 | 447 | 134 |

== Honours ==
Cobh Ramblers

- League of Ireland First Division: 2007

Waterford United

- Munster Senior Cup: 2008–09

Cork City

- League of Ireland First Division: 2011
- President's Cup: 2018

Individual

- PFAI First Division Player of the Year: 2011, 2010
- PFAI First Division Team of the Year: 2011, 2010, 2009, 2007
