= 2007–08 Cowdenbeath F.C. season =

Cowdenbeath
2007–08 season
- Manager: Brian Welsh
- Stadium: Central Park
- Scottish Second Division: Ninth (relegated)
- Challenge Cup: First round, lost to v Peterhead
- League Cup: Second Round, lost to v Gretna
- Scottish Cup: Fourth Round, lost to v Livingston
- Top goalscorer: League: Pat Clarke (6); Denis McLaughlin (6); All: Pat Clarke (8)

During the 2007–08 season Cowdenbeath competed in the Scottish Second Division, Scottish Cup, Scottish League Cup and the Challenge Cup.

== Summary ==
Cowdenbeath finished ninth in the Second Division, entering the play-offs losing 2–1 to Arbroath in the semifinal. They reached the fourth round of the Scottish Cup, the second round of the League Cup and were eliminated in the first round of the Challenge Cup.

== Results & fixtures ==
Win Draw Loss

=== Scottish Second Division ===
4 August 2007 Second Division	Berwick Rangers	1–1	Cowdenbeath	Shielfield Park
	Greenhill 25'	BBC Report	McBride 58'	Attendance: 778; Referee: Allan

11 August 2007 Second Division	Cowdenbeath	2–2	Ross County	Central Park
	Dalziel 66'; Howat 82'	BBC Report	Barrowman 46'; Adams 52'	Attendance: 320; Referee: Boyle

18 August 2007 Second Division	Peterhead	4–2	Cowdenbeath	Balmoor
	Mackay 31'; Bavidge 67'; Kozminski 72', 75'	BBC Report	McConalogue 41'; Bavidge 58' (Own goal)	Attendance: 630; Referee: Somers

25 August 2007 Second Division	Cowdenbeath	1–0	Raith Rovers	Central Park
	Deasley 37'	BBC Report		Attendance: 1,953; Referee: Freeland

1 September 2007 Second Division	Brechin City	1–1	Cowdenbeath	Glebe Park
	King 90'	BBC Report	Doherty 35'	Attendance: 448; Referee: Boyd

15 September 2007 Second Division	Cowdenbeath	1–1	Ayr United	Central Park
	Dalziel 69'	BBC Report	Williams 41'	Attendance: 452; Referee: Charleston

22 September 2007 Second Division	Alloa Athletic	3–2	Cowdenbeath	Recreation Park
	Townsley 15'; Wilson 50'; Forrest 72'	BBC Report	Gilfillan 16'; Scullion 63'	Attendance: 613; Referee: Underhill

29 September 2007 Second Division	Cowdenbeath	1–1	Airdrie United	Central Park
15:00	Clarke 5'	BBC Report	Noble 55'	Attendance: 493; Referee: Boyd

6 October 2007 Second Division	Queen's Park	0–1	Cowdenbeath	Hampden Park
		BBC Report	Clarke 51' (Penalty)	Attendance: 614; Referee: McKendrick

20 October 2007 Second Division	Cowdenbeath	3–1	Berwick Rangers	Central Park
	Clarke 67', 80', 90'	BBC Report	Diack 75'	Attendance: 319; Referee: MacDonald

27 October 2007 Second Division	Cowdenbeath	0–2	Peterhead	Central Park
		BBC Report	Bagshaw 7'; McDonald 15'	Attendance: 293; Referee: O'Reilly

3 November 2007 Second Division	Raith Rovers	2–0	Cowdenbeath	Stark's Park
	Hislop 15'; Goodwillie 29'	BBC Report		Attendance: 2,357; Referee: Charleston

10 November 2007 Second Division	Cowdenbeath	1–0	Brechin City	Central Park
	McBride 64'	BBC Report		Attendance: 363; Referee: Muir

1 December 2007 Second Division	Ayr United	1–4	Cowdenbeath	Somerset Park
	Williams 21'	BBC Report	Scullion 29'; Hill 59'; Ramsay 65'; Armstrong 75'	Attendance: 1,014; Referee: Somers

8 December 2007 Second Division	Airdrie United	3–1	Cowdenbeath	Excelsior Stadium
15:00	McDougall 18'; Noble 36'; Russell 79'	BBC Report	McConalogue 3'	Attendance: 823; Referee: Finnie

15 December 2007 Second Division	Cowdenbeath	1–4	Alloa Athletic	Central Park
	Scullion 90'	BBC Report	Brown 22', 62', 69'; Ferguson 26'	Attendance: 356; Referee: Boyd

29 December 2007 Second Division	Peterhead	1–0	Cowdenbeath	Balmoor
	Bagshaw 52'	BBC Report		Attendance: 639; Referee: Winter

2 January 2008 Second Division	Cowdenbeath	1–4	Raith Rovers	Central Park
	Ramsay 21'	BBC Report	Sloan 9'; Hislop 66'; Templeton 67'; Weir 84'	Attendance: 1,896; Referee: Nicholls

5 January 2008 Second Division	Cowdenbeath	2–0	Ayr United	Central Park
	Trialist 9'; Dempster 76'	BBC Report		Attendance: 297; Referee: Conroy

19 January 2008 Second Division	Brechin City	0–1	Cowdenbeath	Glebe Park
		BBC Report	Dempster 38' (Penalty)	Attendance: 432; Referee: Smith

26 January 2008 Second Division	Cowdenbeath	2–4	Ross County	Central Park
	Clarke 70'; Dempster 89'	BBC Report	J Armstrong 1' (Own goal); D Armstrong 31' (Own goal); Scott 48'; Barrowman 78'	Attendance: 362; Referee: McLean

9 February 2008 Second Division	Cowdenbeath	0–1	Airdrie United	Central Park
15:00		BBC Report	Noble 58'	Attendance: 475; Referee: Muir

16 February 2008 Second Division	Alloa Athletic	3–2	Cowdenbeath	Recreation Park
	Andrew 49'; Ferguson 83' (Penalty); Scott 89'	ESPN Report	Manson 52'; Gates 57'	Attendance: 542; Referee: McDermott

23 February 2008 Second Division	Cowdenbeath	0–4	Peterhead	Central Park
		BBC Report	Adamson 18' (Own goal); Mann 48'; Good 58'; Bavidge 72'	Attendance: 244; Referee: Underhill

1 March 2008 Second Division	Raith Rovers	3–2	Cowdenbeath	Stark's Park
	Goodwillie 22'; Davidson 25', 79'	BBC Report	Fahey 34' (Own goal); McQuade 61'	Attendance: 1,607; Referee: Norris

4 March 2008 Second Division	Ross County	4–1	Cowdenbeath	Victoria Park
	Keddie 39'; Higgins 55'; Barrowman 62'; Winters 89'	BBC Report	McBride 81' (Penalty)	Attendance: 1,511; Referee: MacDonald

11 March 2008 Second Division	Berwick Rangers	4–5	Cowdenbeath	Shielfield Park
	Little 32', 45'; Greenhill 70'; Fairbairn 72'	BBC Report	McLaughlin 1', 4', 75', 90'; Ramsay 44'	Attendance: 259; Referee: Tumilty

15 March 2008 Second Division	Cowdenbeath	1–2	Berwick Rangers	Central Park
	Droudge 8'	BBC Report	Gemmill 29', 62'	Attendance: 284; Referee: Smith

17 March 2008 Second Division	Cowdenbeath	2–4	Queen's Park	Central Park
	Dempster 17' (Penalty); Gilfillan 86'	BBC Report	Kettlewell 18'; Ferry 51'; Trouten 72' (Penalty), 83' (Penalty)	Attendance: 317; Referee: Boyle

22 March 2008 Second Division	Ayr United	1–1	Cowdenbeath	Somerset Park
	Easton 90'	BBC Report	Dempster 47'	Attendance: 1,010; Referee: Winter

29 March 2008 Second Division	Cowdenbeath	0–2	Brechin City	Central Park
		BBC Report	Smith 82'; Nelson 85'	Attendance: 259; Referee: Conroy

1 April 2008 Second Division	Queen's Park	2–3	Cowdenbeath	Hampden Park
	Ferry 54'; Quinn 84'	BBC Report	Gates 32'; McQuade 35'; McLaughlin 78'	Attendance: 431; Referee: Charleston

5 April 2008 Second Division	Cowdenbeath	1–1	Alloa Athletic	Central Park
	McQuade 66'	BBC Report	Brown 86'	Attendance: 272; Referee: Robertson

15 April 2008 Second Division	Airdrie United	4–0	Cowdenbeath	Excelsior Stadium
19:45	Andreoni 20'; Holmes 36'; Prunty 60'; Waddell 79'	BBC Report		Attendance: 735; Referee: Law

19 April 2008 Second Division	Ross County	3–0	Cowdenbeath	Victoria Park
	Barrowman 2', 55'; Higgins 28'	BBC Report		Attendance: 3,716; Referee: McDermott

26 April 2008 Second Division	Cowdenbeath	1–0	Queen's Park	Central Park
	McLaughlin 48'	BBC Report		Attendance: 380; Referee: Boyd

=== Second Division play-offs ===
30 April 2008 Play-offs SF R1	Arbroath	1–1	Cowdenbeath	Gayfield Park
	Watson 58'	BBC Report	Scullion 75' (pen.)	Attendance: 638; Referee: Murray

3 May 2008 Play-offs SF R2	Cowdenbeath	1–2 (a.e.t.)	Arbroath	Central Park
	McQuade 71'	BBC Report	Black 83'; Raeside 115'	Attendance: 778; Referee: Collum

=== Challenge Cup ===
14 August 2007 Challenge Cup round 1	Peterhead	1–0	Cowdenbeath	Balmoor Stadium
	Cowie 90'	BBC Report		Attendance: 531; Referee: Freeland

=== League Cup ===
7 August 2007 League Cup round 1	Cowdenbeath	2–0	Dumbarton	Central Park
	Clarke 69'; Dalziel 77'; McBride (yellow card) 25' (yellow-red card) 84'	BBC Report	Nugent (red card) 82'	Attendance: 322; Referee: Tumilty

28 August 2007 League Cup round 2	Gretna	3–1	Cowdenbeath	Fir Park
	Barr 52'; Yantorno 85'; Jenkins 88'	BBC Report	O'Neil 13'	Attendance: 342; Referee: Winter

=== Scottish Cup ===
24 November 2007 Scottish Cup round 3	Arbroath	0–1	Cowdenbeath	Gayfield Park
	Tosh (yellow card) 13' (yellow-red card) 38'	BBC Report	Clarke 5' (pen.)	Attendance: 595; Referee: Freeland

15 January 2008 Scottish Cup round 4	Livingston	2–0	Cowdenbeath	Almondvale Stadium
	Craig 4'; McMenamin 31'	BBC Report		Attendance: 830; Referee: Freeland

== League table ==
Pos	Team	Pld	W	D	L	GF	GA	GD	Pts	Promotion, qualification or relegation
6	Brechin City	36	13	13	10	63	48	+15	52	
7	Ayr United	36	13	7	16	51	62	−11	46	
8	Queen's Park	36	13	5	18	48	51	−3	44	
9	Cowdenbeath (R)	36	10	7	19	47	73	−26	37	Qualification for the Second Division Play-offs (Note: The 9th placed team were entered into a play-off with the Third Division's 2nd, 3rd and 4th placed teams. The winning team were awarded a place in the 2008–09 Second Division, Cowdenbeath were relegated and Arbroath were promoted. Due to Gretna's relegation, Stranraer were also promoted.)
10	Berwick Rangers (R)	36	3	7	26	40	101	−61	16	Relegation to the Third Division

Source: SPFL Archive
Rules for classification: 1) points; 2) goal difference; 3) number of goals scored.
(R) Relegated

== Player statistics ==
=== Squad ===
No.	Pos	Nat	Player	Total		Scottish Second Division		Scottish Cup		League Cup		Other^{[a]}	
No.	Pos	Nat	Player	Apps	Goals	Apps	Goals	Apps	Goals	Apps	Goals	Apps	Goals
	GK	(Scotland) SCO	David Hay	43	0	36+0	0	2+0	0	2+0	0	3+0	0
	DF	(Scotland) SCO	Kenny Adamson	36	0	27+2	0	2+0	0	2+0	0	3+0	0
	DF	(Scotland) SCO	David Armstrong	17	0	13+0	0	1+0	0	2+0	0	1+0	0
	DF	(Scotland) SCO	John Armstrong	24	1	19+0	1	2+0	0	2+0	0	1+0	0
	DF	(Scotland) SCO	Mark Baxter	11	0	8+0	0	0+0	0	2+0	0	1+0	0
	DF	(Scotland) SCO	Gary Cennerazzo	2	0	2+0	0	0+0	0	0+0	0	0+0	0
	DF	(Scotland) SCO	Dene Droudge	6	1	4+2	1	0+0	0	0+0	0	0+0	0
	DF	(Scotland) SCO	Dougie Hill	34	1	26+1	1	2+0	0	1+1	0	3+0	0
	DF	(Scotland) SCO	Scott Linton	8	0	4+2	0	0+0	0	0+0	0	0+2	0
	DF	(Scotland) SCO	Chris Shanks	13	0	7+4	0	0+0	0	0+0	0	2+0	0
	DF	(Scotland) SCO	Jay Shields	14	0	12+0	0	0+0	0	0+0	0	2+0	0
	MF	(Scotland) SCO	Chris Anton	6	0	4+2	0	0+0	0	0+0	0	0+0	0
	MF	(Scotland) SCO	Tony Brian	2	0	0+1	0	0+0	0	0+0	0	1+0	0
	MF	(Scotland) SCO	Mark Boyle	1	0	0+1	0	0+0	0	0+0	0	0+0	0
	MF	(Ireland) EIR	Matthew Doherty	6	1	4+1	1	0+0	0	0+0	0	1+0	0
	MF	(England) ENG	Mick Galloway	15	0	12+0	0	0+0	0	2+0	0	1+0	0
	MF	(Germany) GER	Scott Gates	15	2	12+1	2	0+0	0	0+0	0	1+1	0
	MF	(Scotland) SCO	Bryan Gilfillan	25	2	22+1	2	1+0	0	1+0	0	0+0	0
	MF	(Scotland) SCO	David Hannah	4	0	3+0	0	1+0	0	0+0	0	0+0	0
	MF	(Northern Ireland) NIR	Danny Lennon	3	0	2+1	0	0+0	0	0+0	0	0+0	0
	MF	(Scotland) SCO	Matt Lynch	2	0	2+0	0	0+0	0	0+0	0	0+0	0
	MF	(Scotland) SCO	Danny Mackay	1	0	0+1	0	0+0	0	0+0	0	0+0	0
	MF	(Scotland) SCO	Sean Mackle	3	0	2+1	0	0+0	0	0+0	0	0+0	0
	MF		Ondrej Matusik	4	0	1+2	0	0+0	0	0+0	0	0+1	0
	MF	(Scotland) SCO	Stephen Manson	8	1	3+4	1	1+0	0	0+0	0	0+0	0
	MF	(Scotland) SCO	Martin McBride	34	3	17+13	3	2+0	0	1+0	0	0+1	0
	MF	(Scotland) SCO	John O'Neil	36	1	20+10	0	1+1	0	2+0	1	2+0	0
	MF	(Slovakia) SVK	Marek Tomana	8	0	6+0	0	0+0	0	0+0	0	2+0	0
	MF	(Scotland) SCO	Mark Ramsay	24	3	19+1	3	2+0	0	0+0	0	2+0	0
	MF	(Scotland) SCO	Jamie Reid	1	0	1+0	0	0+0	0	0+0	0	0+0	0
	MF	(Scotland) SCO	Jon Robertson	12	0	6+4	0	0+1	0	0+0	0	0+1	0
	MF	(Scotland) SCO	Pat Scullion	37	4	26+4	3	1+1	0	1+1	0	3+0	1
	FW	(Scotland) SCO	David Bingham	9	0	6+2	0	1+0	0	0+0	0	0+0	0
	FW	(Scotland) SCO	Pat Clarke	15	8	10+2	6	1+0	1	1+0	1	1+0	0
	FW	(Scotland) SCO	Scott Dalziel	20	3	6+10	2	0+1	0	1+1	1	1+0	0
	FW	(Scotland) SCO	Bryan Deasley	7	1	5+1	1	0+0	0	1+0	0	0+0	0
	FW	(Scotland) SCO	John Dempster	12	5	10+2	5	0+0	0	0+0	0	0+0	0
	FW	(Scotland) SCO	John Ferguson	1	0	0+1	0	0+0	0	0+0	0	0+0	0
	FW	(Scotland) SCO	Andy Howat	13	1	2+8	1	0+1	0	0+2	0	0+0	0
	FW	(Scotland) SCO	Stephen McConalogue	18	2	12+3	2	1+0	0	1+1	0	0+0	0
	FW	(Ireland) EIR	Denis McLaughlin	15	6	8+5	6	0+0	0	0+0	0	2+0	0
	FW	(Scotland) SCO	Paul McQuade	18	4	12+3	3	1+0	0	0+0	0	1+1	1
	FW	(Scotland) SCO	Callum Young	2	0	0+1	0	0+1	0	0+0	0	0+0	0
	FW	(Scotland) SCO	Trialist	3	1	2+1	1	0+0	0	0+0	0	0+0	0

a. Includes other competitive competitions, including playoffs and the Scottish Challenge Cup.
