= 2007–08 Ross County F.C. season =

Ross County
2007–08 season
- Chairman: Roy MacGregor
- Manager: Dick Campbell (until 2 October); Derek Adams (from 4 October)
- Stadium: Victoria Park
- Second Division: First place (champions)
- Challenge Cup: Second round, lost to St Johnstone
- League Cup: Second round, lost to Dundee United
- Scottish Cup: Fifth round, lost to St Johnstone
- Top goalscorer: League: Andrew Barrowman (24); All: Andrew Barrowman (29)
- Highest home attendance: 3,716 vs. Cowdenbeath, 19 April 2008
- Lowest home attendance: 1,511 vs. Cowdenbeath, 4 March 2008
- Average home league attendance: 2,246

The 2007–08 season was Ross County's first season back in the Scottish Second Division, having been relegated from the Scottish First Division at the end of the 2006–07 season. They also competed in the Challenge Cup, League Cup and the Scottish Cup.

== Summary ==
Ross County finished first in the Second Division and were promoted to the First Division. They reached the second round of the Challenge Cup, the second round of the League Cup and the fifth round of the Scottish Cup.

=== Management ===
The club started the 2007–08 season under the management of Dick Campbell, who had been appointed during pre season following the resignation of Scott Leitch. On 2 October 2007, Campbell was sacked as manager with player coach Derek Adams being appointed as temporary manager. Adam's position was made permanent in November.

== Results and fixtures ==
Win Draw Loss

=== Scottish Second Division ===
4 August 2007 Scottish Second Division	Ross County	2 – 0	Ayr United	Victoria Park
	Barrowman 4'; Petrie 60'	BBC Report		Attendance: 2,164; Referee: Freeland

11 August 2007 Scottish Second Division	Cowdenbeath	2 – 2	Ross County	Central Park
	Dalziel 66'; Howat 82'	BBC Report	Barrowman 46'; Adams 52'	Attendance: 320; Referee: Boyle

18 August 2007 Scottish Second Division	Queen's Park	3 – 2	Ross County	Hampden Park
	Sinclair 13'; Canning 75'; Dunn 84'	BBC Report	Anderson 25'; McCulloch 88'	Attendance: 815; Referee: Norris

25 August 2007 Scottish Second Division	Ross County	1 – 0	Peterhead	Victoria Park
	Higgins 24'	BBC Report		Attendance: 2,056; Referee: O'Reilly

1 September 2007 Scottish Second Division	Ross County	1 – 1	Airdrie United	Victoria Park
15;00	Barrowman 39'	ESPN Report	Noble 31'	Attendance: 2,094; Referee: Underhill

15 September 2007 Scottish Second Division	Raith Rovers	0 – 2	Ross County	Stark's Park
		BBC Report	Petrie 73', 83'	Attendance: 2,101; Referee: Nicholls

22 September 2007 Scottish Second Division	Berwick Rangers	0 – 1	Ross County	Shielfield Park
		BBC Report	Barrowman 8' (Penalty)	Attendance: 495; Referee: Norris

29 September 2007 Scottish Second Division	Ross County	2 – 2	Alloa Athletic	Victoria Park
	Brady 41'; Moore 79'	BBC Report	Andrew 66'; Grant 74'	Attendance: 2,115; Referee: Brown

6 October 2007 Scottish Second Division	Ross County	2 – 1	Brechin City	Victoria Park
	Petrie 50'; Shields 67'	BBC Report	Gribben 66'	Attendance: 2,022; Referee: Freeland

20 October 2007 Scottish Second Division	Ayr United	1 – 4	Ross County	Somerset Park
	Williams 77' (Penalty)	BBC Report	Adams 10'; Petrie 24', 31'; Barrowman 26'	Attendance: 1,087; Referee: Winter

27 October 2007 Scottish Second Division	Ross County	1 – 1	Queen's Park	Victoria Park
	Boyd 85'	BBC Report	Ferry 4'	Attendance: 2,323; Referee: Somers

3 November 2007 Scottish Second Division	Peterhead	1 – 2	Ross County	Balmoor Stadium
	Sharp 55'	BBC Report	Petrie 41', 61'	Attendance: 815; Referee: Law

10 November 2007 Scottish Second Division	Airdrie United	0 – 1	Ross County	Excelsior Stadium
15:00		BBC Report	Shields 80'	Attendance: 1,062; Referee: Tumilty

1 December 2007 Scottish Second Division	Ross County	2 – 3	Raith Rovers	Victoria Park
	Barrowman 47'; Scott 90'	BBC Report	Hislop 2', 59' (Penalty); Weir 88'	Attendance: 2,729; Referee: Norris

8 December 2007 Scottish Second Division	Alloa Athletic	3 – 1	Ross County	Recreation Park
	Brown 4'; Agnew 21'; Townsley 64'	BBC Report	Dowie 77'	Attendance: 523; Referee: Boyle

15 December 2007 Scottish Second Division	Ross County	2 – 1	Berwick Rangers	Victoria Park
	Higgins 54'; Shields 76'	BBC Report	Swanson 65'	Attendance: 2,027; Referee: Finnie

29 December 2007 Scottish Second Division	Queen's Park	0 – 1	Ross County	Hampden Park
		ESPN Report	Barrowman 49'	Attendance: 657; Referee: Brown

2 January 2008 Scottish Second Division	Ross County	5 – 1	Peterhead	Victoria Park
	Keddie 25'; Barrowman 45', 56'; Shields 70'; Moore 72'	BBC Report	Mann 14'	Attendance: 2,213; Referee: MacDonald

5 January 2008 Scottish Second Division	Raith Rovers	0 – 1	Ross County	Stark's Park
		BBC Report	Higgins 34'; Lawson (red card) 65'	Attendance: 2,319; Referee: Charleston

19 January 2008 Scottish Second Division	Ross County	3 – 2	Airdrie United	Victoria Park
15:00	Barrowman 25', 90'; Golabek 55'	BBC Report	McDonald 2'; Noble 58'	Attendance: 2,319; Referee: Finnie

26 January 2008 Scottish Second Division	Cowdenbeath	2 – 4	Ross County	Central Park
	Clarke 70'; Dempster 89'	BBC Report	J Armstrong 1' (Own goal); D Armstrong 31' (Own goal); Scott 48'; Barrowman 78'	Attendance: 362; Referee: McLean

9 February 2008 Scottish Second Division	Ross County	6 – 1	Alloa Athletic	Victoria Park
	Golabek 22'; Barrowman 32'; Higgins 36'; Shields 55'; Keddie 61'; Dowie 90'	BBC Report	Coakley 85'	Attendance: 2,272; Referee: Nicholls

16 February 2008 Scottish Second Division	Berwick Rangers	0 – 4	Ross County	Shielfield Park
		BBC Report	Strachan 20'; Horn 23' (Own goal); Barrowman 22', 71'	Attendance: 449; Referee: Brown

23 February 2008 Scottish Second Division	Ross County	3 – 2	Queen's Park	Victoria Park
	Gardyne 5'; Barrowman 27'; Lawson 83'	BBC Report	Ferry 45'; Trouten 62'	Attendance: 2,162; Referee: Freeland

26 February 2008 Scottish Second Division	Brechin City	1 – 2	Ross County	Glebe Park
	Paton 34'	ESPN Report	Higgins 1', 50'	Attendance: 561; Referee: McKendrick

1 March 2008 Scottish Second Division	Peterhead	1 – 1	Ross County	Balmoor Stadium
	Bavidge 30'; Anderson (red card) 80'	BBC Report	Higgins 19'	Attendance: 762; Referee: Muir

4 March 2008 Scottish Second Division	Ross County	4 – 1	Cowdenbeath	Victoria Park
	Keddie 39'; Higgins 55'; Barrowman 62'; Winters 89'	BBC Report	McBride 81' (Penalty)	Attendance: 1,511; Referee: MacDonald

11 March 2008 Scottish Second Division	Ross County	2 – 4	Ayr United	Victoria Park
	Higgins 62'; Gardyne 78'	BBC Report	Wardlaw 30'; Williams 31'; Stevenson 45', 51'	Attendance: 1,627; Referee: Charleston

15 March 2008 Scottish Second Division	Ayr United	0 – 2	Ross County	Somerset Park
		BBC Report	Barrowman 52'; Gardyne 69'	Attendance: 1,078; Referee: Parry

18 March 2008 Scottish Second Division	Ross County	0 – 0	Brechin City	Victoria Park
		BBC Report		Attendance: 1,552; Referee: Tumilty

22 March 2008 Scottish Second Division	Ross County	2 – 3	Raith Rovers	Victoria Park
	Barrowman 18'; Scott 20'	BBC Report	Templeton 25'; Goodwillie 28', 67'	Attendance: 2,973; Referee: Murray

5 April 2008 Scottish Second Division	Ross County	4 – 0	Berwick Rangers	Victoria Park
	Shields 6'; Barrowman 45', 64' (Penalty); Lawson 82'	BBC Report	McMullan (red card) 64'	Attendance: 2,579; Referee: MacDonald

9 April 2008 Scottish Second Division	Airdrie United	2 – 0	Ross County	Excelsior Stadium
19;45	Noble 23'; Russell 56'	BBC Report		Attendance: 724; Referee: Salmond

12 April 2008 Scottish Second Division	Alloa Athletic	2 – 0	Ross County	Recreation Park
	Ferguson 86', 90'	BBC Report		Attendance: 452; Referee: Boyle

19 April 2008 Scottish Second Division	Ross County	3 – 0	Cowdenbeath	Victoria Park
	Barrowman 2', 55'; Higgins 28'	BBC Report		Attendance: 3,716; Referee: McDermott

26 April 2008 Scottish Second Division	Brechin City	3 – 3	Ross County	Glebe Park
	Smith 40'; Janczyk 51'; Dyer 60'	BBC Report	Gardyne 10'; Barrowman 79'; Winters 83'	Attendance: 586; Referee: Muir

=== Scottish Challenge Cup ===
14 August 2007 Scottish Challenge Cup round 1	Dundee	1 – 2	Ross County	Dens Park
	Sturm 59'; O'Brien (red card) 90'	BBC Report	Barrowman 12' (pen.); Keddie 43'	Attendance: 1,471; Referee: McDonald

5 September 2007 Scottish Challenge Cup round 2	Ross County	0 – 2	St Johnstone	Victoria Park
		BBC Report	Deuchar 14'; Jackson 49'	Attendance: 1,100; Referee: Brines

=== Scottish League Cup ===
7 August 2007 Scottish League Cup round 1	Ross County	3 – 1	Elgin City	Victoria Park
	Dowie 23'; Barrowman 72', 90'	BBC Report	Charlesworth 44'; Dempsie (yellow card) 84' (red card)	Attendance: 1,100; Referee: Somers

29 August 2007 Scottish League Cup round 2	Dundee United	2 – 1	Ross County	Tannadice Park
	Hunt 65' (pen.); Robertson 88'	BBC Report	Barrowman 78'	Attendance: 3,114; Referee: Allan

=== Scottish Cup ===
24 November 2007 Scottish League Cup round 3	Ross County	4 – 0	Whitehill Welfare	Victoria Park
15:00	Shields 16', 56'; Scott 43'; Higgins 88'	BBC Report		Attendance: 1,208; Referee: Charleston

23 January 2008 Scottish League Cup round 4	Cove Rangers	2 – 4	Ross County	Allan Park
19:45	Watt 63', 76' (Penalty)	BBC Report	Shields 10'; Dowie 30'; Boyd 33'; Barrowman 40' (Penalty)	Attendance: 1,200; Referee: O'Reilly

12 February 2008 Scottish League Cup round 5	Ross County	0 – 1	St Johnstone	Victoria Park
19:45		BBC Report	Craig 14'	Attendance: 2,385; Referee: Collum

== League table ==
Pos	Team	Pld	W	D	L	GF	GA	GD	Pts	Promotion, qualification or relegation
1	Ross County (C, P)	36	22	7	7	78	44	+34	73	Promotion to the First Division
2	Airdrie United (P)	36	20	6	10	64	34	+30	66	Qualification for the First Division Play-offs (Note: The 2nd, 3rd and 4th placed teams will be entered into a play-off with the First Division's 9th placed team. The winning team were awarded a place in the 2008–09 First Division, Clyde won the play-off to stay in the division. However, with Gretna being relegated to the Third Division, Airdrie were promoted to Division One. Airdrie United won promotion to the First Division after Gretna were relegated to the Third Division.)
3	Raith Rovers	36	19	3	14	60	50	+10	60	Qualification for the First Division Play-offs
4	Alloa Athletic	36	16	8	12	57	56	+1	56	Qualification for the First Division Play-offs
5	Peterhead	36	16	7	13	65	54	+11	55	

Source: SPFL Archive
Rules for classification: 1) points; 2) goal difference; 3) number of goals scored.
(C) Champions; (P) Promoted

== Player statistics ==
=== Squad ===
No.	Pos	Nat	Player	Total		Second Division		Challenge Cup		League Cup		Scottish Cup	
No.	Pos	Nat	Player	Apps	Goals	Apps	Goals	Apps	Goals	Apps	Goals	Apps	Goals
	GK	(England) ENG	Tony Bullock	30	0	24+0	0	1+0	0	2+0	0	3+0	0
	GK	(Scotland) SCO	Allan Creer	4	0	4+0	0	0+0	0	0+0	0	0+0	0
	GK	(Scotland) SCO	Matthew Cartis	2	0	0+0	0	1+1	0	0+0	0	0+0	0
	GK	(Scotland) SCO	Joe Malin	8	0	8+0	0	0+0	0	0+0	0	0+0	0
	DF	(Scotland) SCO	Iain Campbell	12	0	10+0	0	0+0	0	1+0	0	1+0	0
	DF	(Scotland) SCO	Andy Dowie	41	4	33+1	2	2+0	0	2+0	1	3+0	1
	DF	(Scotland) SCO	Graham Girvan	2	0	2+0	0	0+0	0	0+0	0	0+0	0
	DF	(Scotland) SCO	Stuart Golabek	33	2	26+0	2	2+0	0	2+0	0	3+0	0
	DF	(Scotland) SCO	Alex Keddie	35	4	27+1	3	2+0	1	2+0	0	3+0	0
	DF	(Scotland) SCO	Mark McCulloch	36	1	30+0	1	2+0	0	2+0	0	2+0	0
	DF	(Scotland) SCO	Gary Miller	23	0	19+1	0	0+0	0	0+0	0	1+2	0
	DF	(Scotland) SCO	David Niven	1	0	0+1	0	0+0	0	0+0	0	0+0	0
	DF	(Scotland) SCO	Hugh Robertson	4	0	0+4	0	0+0	0	0+0	0	0+0	0
	DF	(Trinidad and Tobago) TRI	Brent Sancho	2	0	2+0	0	0+0	0	0+0	0	0+0	0
	DF	(Northern Ireland) NIR	Sean Webb	1	0	0+0	0	0+0	0	0+1	0	0+0	0
	MF	(Scotland) SCO	Derek Adams	15	2	11+0	2	2+0	0	2+0	0	0+0	0
	MF	(Scotland) SCO	Iain Anderson	10	1	3+4	1	1+1	0	1+0	0	0+0	0
	MF	(Scotland) SCO	Darren Brady	22	1	14+3	1	2+0	0	0+1	0	2+0	0
	MF	(Scotland) SCO	Paul Lawson	28	2	24+0	2	1+0	0	0+0	0	2+1	0
	MF	(Scotland) SCO	Daniel Moore	23	2	7+12	2	0+1	0	1+1	0	0+1	0
	MF	(Scotland) SCO	Martin Scott	38	4	21+10	3	2+0	0	2+0	0	3+0	1
	MF	(Scotland) SCO	Adam Strachan	20	1	10+8	1	0+0	0	0+0	0	1+1	0
	FW	(Scotland) SCO	Andrew Barrowman	39	29	32+1	24	2+0	1	2+0	3	2+0	1
	FW	(Scotland) SCO	Scott Boyd	25	2	21+2	1	0+0	0	0+0	0	2+0	1
	FW	(Scotland) SCO	Michael Gardyne	16	4	9+7	4	0+0	0	0+0	0	0+0	0
	FW	(Scotland) SCO	Ross Grant	1	0	0+1	0	0+0	0	0+0	0	0+0	0
	FW	(Scotland) SCO	Craig Gunn	17	0	2+13	0	0+0	0	1+0	0	0+1	0
	FW	(Scotland) SCO	Sean Higgins	41	11	23+11	10	0+2	0	1+1	0	2+1	1
	FW	(Scotland) SCO	Stewart Petrie	29	8	15+9	8	2+0	0	1+0	0	0+2	0
	FW	(Scotland) SCO	Dene Shields	30	9	17+8	6	0+1	0	0+1	0	3+0	3
	FW	(Scotland) SCO	David Winters	6	2	2+4	2	0+0	0	0+0	0	0+0	0

== See also ==
- List of Ross County F.C. seasons
