= Tony Kinder =

Scottish lecturer and councillor

- Born: Anthony Kenneth Kinder; 1949 (age 76–77)
- Occupations: Lecturer; Councillor

Tony Kinder (born 1949) is a Scottish lecturer, councillor and a previous director and chairman of professional football club Livingston.

== Career ==
He was a senior lecturer in Business Studies at the University of Edinburgh.

Kinder was a councillor in West Lothian until 1999. He quit his role with the Labour Party after accusing his colleagues of waging a campaign to discredit him.

He was part of the Lionheart consortium, along with Pearse Flynn and Maurice Smith, that bought Livingston. Having served as a director, he became club chairman in June 2004. He later gave evidence in the fraud trial of Dominic Keane in 2009.

As of April 2025, Kinder is a professor at Tampere University.
