= Andy Gemmell =

Scottish footballer

Personal information
- Full name: Andrew Gemmell
- Date of birth: 27 July 1945
- Place of birth: Greenock, Scotland
- Date of death: 27 May 2021 (aged 75)
- Place of death: Spain
- Position: Winger

Senior career*
Years	Team	Apps	(Gls)
- Rankin Park United
1965–1966	Greenock Morton	0	(0)
1966–1967	Bradford City	3	(0)
- Dunoon Athletic
Total		3	(0)
- * Club domestic league appearances and goals

Andrew Gemmell (27 July 1945 – 27 May 2021) was a Scottish professional footballer who played as a winger.

== Career ==
Born in Greenock, Gemmell played for Rankin Park United, Greenock Morton, Bradford City and Dunoon Athletic.

In October 2007, Gemmell joined the board of Scottish Football League club Dumbarton.

In July 2009, Gemmell, Neil Rankine, Ged Nixon and Gordon McDougall were part of Livingston 5 Consortium that bought Livingston, who were facing a financial crisis under the ownership of Italian lawyer Angelo Massone. He remained at the club as a director when Gordon Ford became the majority shareholder in 2015.

== Death ==
Gemmell died in Spain on 27 May 2021, aged 75.
