= Maurice Smith =

Maurice Smith may refer to:

- Maurice Smith (fighter) (born 1961), American kickboxer and mixed martial artist
- Maurice Smith (running back) (born 1976), American football player
- Maurice Smith (cornerback) (born 1995), American football player
- Maurice Smith (journalist) (1909–1985), England-born Canadian journalist
- Maurice Smith (decathlete) (born 1980), Jamaican decathlete
- Maurice Smith (politician), MLA for Nova Scotia
- Clipper Smith (American football, born 1898) (Maurice J. Smith, 1898–1984), American football player and coach
- Maurice K. Smith (1926–2020), New Zealand-born architect and architectural educator
- Maurice Smith (racing driver), American racing driver
- Maurice Smith (businessman) (born 1960), Scottish businessman and director of football club Livingston
- Maurice Smith (producer), British-born film producer

== See also ==
- Morris Smith (disambiguation)
