= Pat Scullion =

Scottish footballer

Personal information
- Full name: James Patrick Scullion
- Date of birth: 2 March 1986 (age 40)
- Place of birth: Dunfermline, Scotland
- Position: Utility player

Senior career*
Years	Team	Apps	(Gls)
2004–2005	Dunfermline Athletic	1	(0)
2005	Elgin City	12	(2)
2006–2008	Cowdenbeath	63	(6)
2008–2009	Alloa Athletic	28	(1)
2009–2011	Stenhousemuir	38	(4)
2011–2014	Clyde	92	(10)
2014–2016	Cowdenbeath	30	(1)
2016–2017	Alloa Athletic	1	(0)
2016–2017	→ Berwick Rangers (loan)	5	(1)
2017	Berwick Rangers	28	(1)
2018	Edinburgh City	17	(1)
2018–2019	Cowdenbeath	4	(1)
2019	Gala Fairydean Rovers		
2019–2020	Linlithgow Rose		
2020–2022	Inverkeithing	30	(3)

Managerial career
- 2022: Inverkeithing
- 2023–2025: East Stirlingshire
- * Club domestic league appearances and goals

James Patrick Scullion (born 2 March 1986) is a retired professional Scottish footballer who was an utility player. His most recent position was manager of Scottish Lowland team East Stirlingshire.

Scullion has previously played with Dunfermline Athletic, Elgin City, Cowdenbeath, Alloa Athletic, Stenhousemuir, Clyde, Berwick Rangers and Edinburgh City.

== Football career ==
Scullion began his career with his local side Dunfermline Athletic, making only one appearance for his home town team before joining Elgin City in May 2005. He left Elgin during the Winter transfer window of 2006, signing for Cowdenbeath until he moved to Alloa Athletic in July 2008. Scullion also spent time with Stenhousemuir and Clyde, before signing for Cowdenbeath for a second time on 1 September 2014, having left Clyde on 27 August 2014.

Scullion subsequently spent two seasons with Cowdenbeath, before being released at the end of the 2015–16 season, and re-signing for Alloa Athletic on a short-term deal in August 2016. After making just one appearance for the Wasps, Scullion was loaned out to Scottish League Two side Berwick Rangers in December 2016 on an emergency loan deal until the end of January 2017. With his contract at Recreation Park about to expire, Scullion moved to Berwick permanently on 27 January 2017. After just under a year, Berwick announced that he had left the club by mutual consent. Scullion was without a club for just a short period of time, signing for fellow League Two side Edinburgh City on 1 January 2018, before being released at the end of the season. Scullion returned to Cowdenbeath eventually leaving again in January 2019. He trialed for a few Lowland league teams before signing for Gala Fairydean until the end of the season.

Scullion signed with Linlithgow Rose on 29 June 2019 and left the club on 2 November 2020.

== Career statistics ==
As of match played 28 October 2017

Appearances and goals by club, season and competition
Club	Season	League			Scottish Cup		League Cup		Other^{[A]}		Total	
Club	Season	Division	Apps	Goals	Apps	Goals	Apps	Goals	Apps	Goals	Apps	Goals
Dunfermline Athletic	2004–05	Scottish Premier League	1	0	0	0	0	0	0	0	1	0
Elgin City	2005–06	Scottish Third Division	12	2	1	0	1	0	1 (Note: Appearances in the Scottish Challenge Cup)	0	15	2
Cowdenbeath	2005–06	Scottish Third Division	10	0	0	0	0	0	0	0	10	0
Cowdenbeath	2006–07	Scottish Second Division	24	3	4	0	2	0	1	0	31	3
Cowdenbeath	2007–08	Scottish Second Division	29	3	1	0	2	0	3 (Note: One appearance in the Scottish Challenge Cup; two appearances and a goal in the Second Division play-offs)	1	35	4
Cowdenbeath	Total		63	6	5	0	4	0	4	1	76	7
Alloa Athletic	2008–09	Scottish Second Division	28	1	2	0	2	0	1	0	33	1
Stenhousemuir	2009–10	Scottish Second Division	29	3	2	0	1	0	1	0	33	3
Stenhousemuir	2010–11	Scottish Second Division	8	1	0	0	0	0	0	0	8	1
Stenhousemuir	Total		37	4	2	0	1	0	1	0	41	4
Clyde	2010–11	Scottish Third Division	19	3	0	0	0	0	0	0	19	3
Clyde	2011–12	Scottish Third Division	21	1	0	0	1	0	1	0	23	1
Clyde	2012–13	Scottish Third Division	23	5	2	0	1	0	1	0	27	5
Clyde	2013–14	Scottish League Two	29	1	4	0	0	0	2 (Note: One appearance in the Scottish Challenge Cup and one in the League One play-offs)	0	35	1
Clyde	Total		92	10	6	0	2	0	4	0	104	9
Cowdenbeath	2014–15	Championship	25	0	1	0	0	0	0	0	26	0
Cowdenbeath	2015–16	League One	27	1	2	0	0	0	0	0	27	1
Cowdenbeath	Total		52	1	3	0	0	0	0	0	55	1
Alloa Athletic	2016–17	League One	1	0	0	0	0	0	0	0	1	0
Berwick Rangers (loan)	2016–17	League Two	5	1	0	0	0	0	0	0	5	1
Berwick Rangers	2016–17	League Two	16	1	0	0	0	0	0	0	16	1
Berwick Rangers	2017–18	League Two	8	0	1	1	3	1	2	0	14	2
Berwick Rangers	Total		29	2	1	1	3	1	2	0	35	4
Edinburgh City F.C.	2017–18	League Two	20	0	0	1	3	1	4	0	14	
Career totals			315	26	20	1	13	1	13	1	362	29
