= Tomana =

Tomana is a surname. Notable people with the surname include:

- Johannes Tomana (1967–2023), Zimbabwean attorney and Prosecutor-General
- Marek Tomana (born 1979), Slovak football midfielder
