= Superstox =

Single seat formula racing

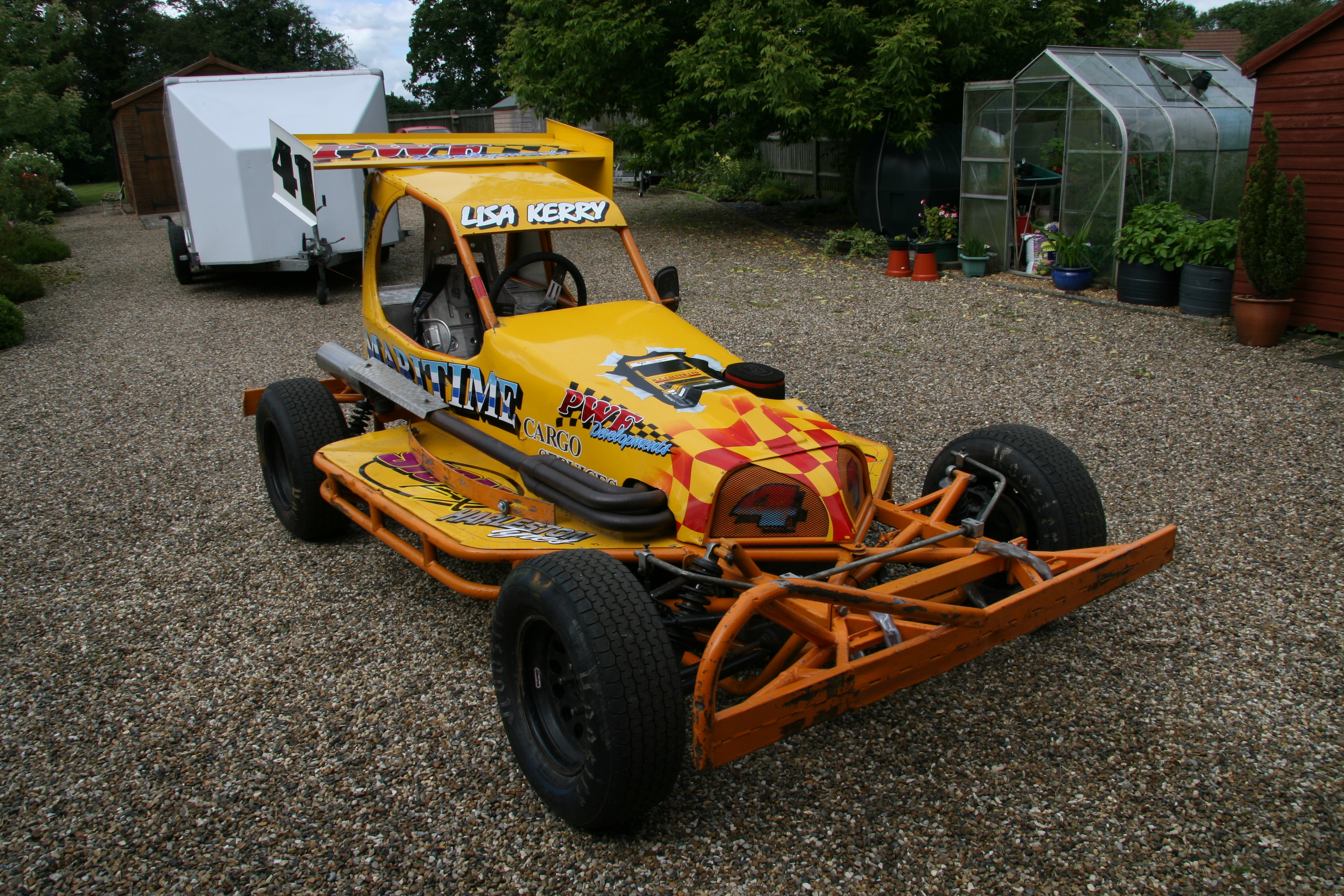
A typical Spedeworth Superstox, built by Carcraft

Superstox is a type of single seat formula racing, similar to Sprint car racing developed in the 1960s in the United Kingdom. Racing is 'contact' whereby drivers can use the front bumper to help dislodge any car in front. Like most other forms of short oval racing, the higher rated drivers normally start at the back of the grid for each race.

Its original roots come from the mid-1950s, it derived as a cheaper alternative to BriSCA Formula One Stock Car Racing, where a smaller junior formula was raced nationally before the Southern 'Spedeworth' short oval tracks broke away from the main promoting body in 1961 to run their own version of Juniors which they called Formula Two. The cars were originally standard or 'stock' but became more modified over the years until 1968 when a new 'stock' car formula was introduced and the original much modified class became known as Super Stock Cars. This was later shortened to Superstox. Today the class bears no resemblance to a road going car. Chassis are generally built by specialist companies and all the components are special racing ones. The cars are all of front engine design although rear engine was allowed up until the mid-1970s.

Previous famous drivers include 1973 World Champion Derek Warwick and British Champion, Paul Warwick.

== World Championship ==
First raced at Ipswich in 1961 before moving to its longtime home at Wimbledon Stadium. The 1962 World Championship was actually the first car meeting held at Wimbledon. The race originally was a World title in name only although it was an English domiciled Czech, Jan Scott, who won the first running. Later in the sixties the event attracted Spedeworth's Scottish drivers and then the European competitors (the Netherlands, Germany and Belgium) from the NACO organisation. The first European cars to race in the UK were different specifications to the UK counterparts - the 1966 Dutch team having V8 powered saloon cars. A stronger affiliation in the early 1970s saw the European drivers racing rear engine cars although this type of machine proved less robust than a "Super Stock Car" and they become Midgets (non contact short oval racing cars) leaving the newer front engine cars that were appearing on the continent as Superstox. The Superstox formula remained essentially a European one until the appearance of some South African drivers in the late 1960s when Spedeworth gained an affiliation there. The South Africans only contested the championship until the mid-1970s as there was no longer an equivalent class there. One American driver, Al Contreras, represented the US in the early 70s but he, like the inaugural champion, Scott was serving as an airman in this country at the time. The Scottish Superstox died out in the 1980s when Gordon McDougall started his own promotion, breaking away from Spedeworth and affiliating to BriSCA. The Scottish were represented in the title again in 2011 when the class started up again north of the border.

Year	Circuit	Winner	Runner-up	Third place
2026	Lochgelly	907 Jamie McCann	5 Eric Walker	944 Jordan Robinson
2025	Tullyroan	933 Steven Haugh	907 Jamie McCann	713 Ian Beaumont
2024	Hednesford	944 Jordan Robinson	154 Michael Green	5 Eric Walker
2023	Lochgelly	925 Craig McConnell	154 Michael Green	886 Chris Bradbury
2022	Aghadowey	955 Kyle Beattie	925 Craig McConnell	922 Curtis Greer
2021	Ipswich	77 Nick Roots	776 Dan Roots	886 Chris Bradbury
2020	Not Held due to COVID-19 pandemic			
2019	Lochgelly	154 Michael Green	309 Brian Forrest	265 Barry Stephen
2018	Tullyroan	914 Lee Davison	776 Dan Roots	416 Mark Smith
2017	Ipswich	265 Barry Stephen	60 Ben Marjoram	77 Nick Roots
2016	Lochgelly	482 Jason Cooper	Bryan Forrest	886 Chris Bradbury
2015	Aghadowey	886 Chris Bradbury	177 Stuart Gilchrist	53 David Frames
2014	Wimbledon | 376 Steven Jackson			
2013	Lochgelly	376 Steven Jackson	177 Stuart Gilchrist	482 Jason Cooper
2012	Ipswich	177 Stuart Gilchrist		
2011	Wimbledon	(England) 151 Nick Smith		
2010	Ipswich	(England) 51 Colin Aylward		
2009	Wimbledon	(England) 60 Ben Marjoram		
2008	Ipswich	(England) 482 Jason Cooper	(England) 69 Shaun Brooker	(England) 51 Colin Aylward
2007	Wimbledon	(England) 69 Shaun Brooker	(England) 376 Steven Jackson	(England) 482 Jason Cooper
2005	Wimbledon	(England) 482 Jason Cooper		
2004	Swaffham	(England) 174 Paul Poulter		
2003	Wimbledon	22 Mark Kelman		
2002	Swaffham	(England) 612 Garry Sparkes		
2001	Ipswich	(England) 18 Mark Eaton	(England) 22 Mark Kelman	(England) 69 Shaun Brooker
2000	Wimbledon	(England) 323 Dave Turner		
1999	Ipswich	(England) 612 Garry Sparkes		
1998	Wimbledon	(England) 612 Garry Sparkes		
1997	Ipswich	(England) 77 Tony Roots	(Netherlands) John Damen	(England) 118 David Mason
1996	Arena Essex	(England) 7 Glenn Salmon	(England) 118 David Mason	
1995	Wimbledon	(England) 7 Glenn Salmon	(England) 174 Paul Poulter	(Netherlands) 222 John Damen
1994	Warneton	(Netherlands) 212 Luud Lauriejssen		
1993	Wimbledon	(England) 612 Garry Sparkes	(England) 69 Shaun Brooker	(England) Dave Turner
1992	Ballymena	(Northern Ireland) 32 Ian McKnight		
1991	Venray	(England) 88 Darren Innocent		
1990	Wisbech	(England) 4 John Mickel		
1989	Wisbech	(England) 612 Garry Sparkes	(England) 170 Howard White	(England) 4 John Mickel
1988	Arlington	(England) 54 Martyn Brand	(England) 397 Paul Pearson	(England) 170 Howard White
1987	Kaldenkirchen	(England) 54 Martyn Brand	(Netherlands) 16 Ad van Besouw	(England) 482 Neil Bee
1986	Wisbech	(England) 482 Neil Bee	(England) 206 Robin Randall	(England) 170 Howard White
1985	Cowdenbeath	(Scotland) 94 Vic Russell	(Scotland) 84 Robin Brown	(Scotland) Dave Moir
1984	Tilburg	(Netherlands) 4 Antony van den Oetelaar	(Netherlands) 41 Jo van Rengs	(England) 206 Robin Randall
1983	Cleethorpes	(Netherlands) 4 Antony van den Oetelaar	(Netherlands) 41 Jo van Rengs	(Scotland) 39 Les Clark
1982	Cleethorpes	(England) 482 Neil Bee	(England) 546 John Gray	(England) 17 Roy Eaton
1981	Kaldenkirchen	(England) 482 Neil Bee	(England) 320 Dave Pierce	(England) 397 Paul Pearson
1980	Cowdenbeath	(England) 320 Dave Pierce	41 Gordon McDougall	(England) 206 Robin Randall
1979	Yarmouth	(England) 298 Jim Welch	(England) 320 Dave Pierce	(England) 211 Howard Cole
1978	Kaldenkirchen	(Scotland) 41 Gordon McDougall	(England) 211 Howard Cole	(England) 482 Neil Bee
1977	Wimbledon	(England) 298 Jim Welch	(England) 380 Alan Cayzer	(Scotland) 55 Bob Morton
1976	Cowdenbeath	(Scotland) 41 Gordon McDougall	(Scotland) 81 Bill Pullar	(England) 482 Neil Bee
1975	Kaldenkirchen	(England) 482 Neil Bee	(England) 546 John Gray	(England) 217 Bob Perry
1974	Wimbledon	(England) 443 Steve Monk	(England) 320 Dave Pierce	(England) 221 Derek Warwick
1973	Wimbledon	(England) 221 Derek Warwick	(England) 320 Dave Pierce	(England) 364 Tony May
1972	Wimbledon	(England) 294 Geoff Goddard	(England) 264 Pete Welland	(England) 381 John Cayzer
1971	Wimbledon	(England) 294 Geoff Goddard	(England) 320 Dave Pierce	(England) 417 Roger Warnes
1970	Wimbledon	(England) 530 Biffo Sweeney	(England) 213 Doug McMahon	(England) 264 Pete Welland
1969	Wimbledon	(England) 500 Alan Wardropper	(England) 213 Doug McMahon	(England) 217 Bob Perry
1968	Wimbledon	(England) 320 Dave Pierce	(England) 319 Denny Pearson	(England) 304 Derek Fiske
1967	Wimbledon	(England) 531 Todd Sweeney	(England) 320 Dave Pierce	(England) 463 Dell Sticking
1966	Wimbledon	(England) 2 Stan Ingle	(England) 68 Trevor Frost	(England) 320 Dave Pierce
1965	Wimbledon	(England) 210 Eddie James	(England) 399 Chris Studd	(England) 307 Norman Crowe
1964	Wimbledon	(England) 210 Eddie James	(England) 70 Aubrey Dance	(England) 17 Tony Maidment
1963	Wimbledon	(England) 17 Tony Maidment	(England) Chris Cutting	(England) Dave Crittall
1962	Wimbledon	(England) 2 Stan Ingle	(Czechoslovakia) 95 Jan Scott	(England) Ken Wade
1961	Ipswich	(Czechoslovakia) 95 Jan Scott	(England) 17 Tony Maidment	(England) Pete Godsmark

== European Championship ==
Second to the World Championship in status of the races held for this formula, the European was, in the early seasons, the highest status race to be staged outside of the Spedeworth promotion's home circuits. The European Championship has a remarkable history with its first runnings at Baarlo in the Netherlands.

Year	Circuit	Winner		
2023	Ipswich	446 Dean Johnston		
2017	Tullyroan Oval	515 Jordan Aylward	7 Jordan Salmon	530 Brett Wesbroom
2011	Ipswich	(England) Shaun Brooker		
2010	Wimbledon	(England) Ben Marjoram		
2009	Ipswich	(England) Matt Carberry		
2008	Wimbledon	(England) Jason Cooper		
2007	Ipswich	(England) Garry Sparkes		
2006	Swaffham	(England) Jason Cooper		
2005	Ipswich	(England) Ben Marjoram		
2004	Warneton	(England) Mark Kelman	(England) Paul Poulter	(England) Kevin Ferris
2003	Warneton	(England) Mark Kelman		
2001	Wimbledon	(England) Mark Eaton		
2000	Ipswich	(England) Dave Turner		
1999	Warneton	(Netherlands) Ad Mellisant		
1998	Warneton	(England) Geoff Bridges		
1997	Warneton	(England) Tony Roots		
1996	Wimbledon	(England) Garry Sparkes		
1995	Arena Essex Raceway	(England) Garry Sparkes		
1994	Wimbledon	(England) Paul Poulter	(England) Tony Roots	(England) Steve Collison
1993	Netherlands	(England) Shaun Brooker		
1992	Venray	(England) John Mickel		
1991	Wisbech	(England) Darren Innocent		
1990	Armadale	(England) John Mickel	(Scotland) Jim Harris	(England) Gary Chisholm
1989	Tilburg	(England) Garry Sparkes	(England) Rob Perry	(England) Howard White
1988	Tilburg	(England) Martyn Brand		
1987	Arlington	(England) Roy Eaton	(England) Rob Perry	(England) Gerry Cooper
1986	Tilburg	(Netherlands) Jo van Rengs		
1985	Tilburg	(England) Robin Randall	(England) Howard Cole	(England) Martyn Brand
1984	Cowdenbeath	(Scotland) Les Clark	(Scotland) Robin Brown	(Scotland) John Adam
1983		(England) Dave Pierce		
1982	Cowdenbeath	(England) Dave Pierce	(England) Neil Bee	(Scotland) Les Clark
1981	Ballymena	(England) Dave Pierce	(England) Neil Bee	(Northern Ireland) Ian Murdoch
1980	Warneton/B	(England) Dave Pierce	(England) Martyn Brand	(Netherlands) Antony van den Oetelaar
1979	Kaldenkirchen	(England) Dave Pierce	(Scotland) Bill Pullar	(Netherlands) Antony van den Oetelaar
1978	Cowdenbeath	(Scotland) Bill Pullar		
1977	not run			
1976	Posterholt	(England) Steve Monk	(England) Mark Eaton	(England) Alan Cayzer
1975		(England) John Cayzer	(England) Neil Bee	(England) Doug McMahon
1973	Tilburg	(England) Tony May	(Scotland) Ronnie Nisbet	(England) Dave Pierce
1971	Ipswich	(England) Bob Perry	(England) Dave Pierce	(England) Tony May
1970	Cowdenbeath	(Scotland) Malcolm Paterson	(England) Derek Fiske	(England) Biffo Sweeney
1969	not run?			
1968	Amsterdam	(England) Tony May	(England) Alan Freebody	(England) Trevor Frost
1967	Hengelo	(England) Tony May	(England) Trevor Frost	(Czechoslovakia) Jan Scott
1966	Baarlo	(Netherlands) Theo Jansen		
1965	Baarlo	(Netherlands) Adrian Kleyngeld		

== 1966 National Team League ==
Spedeworth set up a National Team League comprising six teams based at seven stadia. The first match took place at Aldershot on 21 May 1966 when the Knights beat the visiting Ipswich team.

=== Aldershot Knights ===
Managed by Frank Howlett

=== Eastbourne Eagles ===
Managed by Charlie Dugard.

=== Ipswich Witches ===
Managed by Pop Perry

=== London Sparrows ===
The team's home fixtures were shared between Wimbledon and New Cross Stadia

=== Yarmouth Bloaters ===
Managed by Ted Payne

=== Chichester ===
The team that never was. The team is referred to in texts from the period with top driver Don Mason mentioned as a driver. The team would most likely have used either Aldershot or Eastbourne as its base but no fixtures were contested by the team.

== 1971 & 1972 Auto Spedeway Team League ==
The Auto Spedeway team league was set up by Stock Car promoter Spedeworth International for the 1971 season. The competition only lasted just under two years. The racing featured the promotion's regular Superstox cars with identical bodies although underneath the chassis often varied. The body style was based on those sported by the touring South African Team in the 1970 season.

The prototype car was displayed on Spedeworth's stand at the 1971 Racing Car Show. The season was structured so that all the teams had two matches against each other, one home and one away. Outside the League competition there were also a couple of multi-team tournament meetings.

The 1972 fixture schedule was not completed due to some driving standards problems and also the closure of Cross in Hand raceway in August that year. Each team was managed by a key person from the within the Spedeworth organisation and the team line ups included most of the top drivers from the era. Despite the closure of Cross in Hand, Spedeworth later staged two friendly matches (in 1972 and 1973) at Aldershot between the Aldershot Knights and the Cross in Hand Tigers.

=== Aldershot Knights ===
Team Manager: Ted Weaver
Drivers: Denny Pearson (captain), Derry Warwick, Roy Wood, Stan Warwick, Ken Etwell, John Field
The Knights were based at Aldershot Stadium in Tongham.

=== Cross in Hand Tigers ===
Team Manager: Les Eaton
Drivers: Dave Pierce (captain), Dave Hindle, Alan Cox, Biffo Sweeney, Art Fowler, Gordon Street.

The Tigers were based at Cross-in-Hand raceway in Sussex

=== Eastbourne Lions ===
Team Manager: Ken Denham
Drivers: Chris Denham, Barry Kelleher, Rod Waller, Jim Stuart, Nigel Fox, Graham Minchin
The Lions joined the league in 1972 and were based at Arlington Stadium, near Eastbourne - the team effectively the old White City / Walthamstow outfit relocating.

=== Ipswich Foxes ===
Team Manager: Harry Barnes
Drivers: Skid Parish (captain), Tony Grant, Norman Crowe, Mike Read, John Biddle, Alan Cayzer. Reserve: Paul Rookyard

=== Ringwood Badgers ===
Team Manager: Alan Butler
Drivers: John Edwards (Captain), Tom Edwards, Cliff Maidment, Gordon Maidment, Derek Warwick, Roy Eaton
The Badgers joined the league in 1972 and were based at Matchams Park although they only ever hosted one home match (due to the demise of the league mid season) which was against the Wimbledon Dons.

=== Walthamstow (formerly White City) Lions ===
Team Manager: Roger Fennings
Drivers: 1971: Chris Denham (captain), Barry Kelleher, Jack Percy, Rod Waller, Jim Stuart, Les Holland. Occasional - Leon Smith The team was originally going to be called the 'White City Slickers'. Neither White City nor Walthamstow were allocated a team for the 1972 season, the driver line up transferred to Eastbourne (Arlington Stadium) for the 1972 campaign.

=== Wimbledon Canaries / Dons ===
Team Manager: Reg Etherington
Drivers: 1971: Eric Taylor, Bryan Kensett (Captain), Tony Mellish, Frank Boyles, John Field, Keith Fransella
1972: Jim Davey (Captain), Frank Boyles, Barry Plummer, Pete Welland, Bryan Kensett, Steve Monk, Keith Fransella, Reserve: Eric Taylor
Based at the Wimbledon Stadium in Plough Lane, the team were originally known as the Canaries but changed their name to the Dons for the 1972 season.

=== Wisbech Fen Tigers ===
Team Manager: Jack Gray

Drivers: Roger Warnes (captain), John Gray, Rick Drewery, Tony May (1972), Stu Blyth, Jack Savage. Reserves: Trevor Blyth, Malcolm Burrell

The Fen Tigers were the inaugural champions in 1971.

=== Yarmouth Greyhounds ===
Team Manager: Ted Payne
Drivers: 1971: Joe Cracknell, Horry Barnes, Colin Byrne, Trevor Blyth, Alan Taylor, Doug McMahon
1972: Doug McMahon (captain), Alan Taylor, Bob Perry, Brian Randall, Pete Marshall, Doug Wardropper

== Corgi Toys ==
Toy manufacturer Corgi produced and sold die-cast models of two major championship winning cars in their 'Corgi Rockets' range. The cars were those of four times British Champion Derek Fiske and 1967 World Champion Adrian 'Todd' Sweeney. These were a good choice to represent the formula as Sweeney's car still had a cut down stock body (from a Renault 4CV) whilst Fiske's was one of the newer home made cabs not derived from a road car.

The cars were sold individually and in varying sets which also included tow cars, trailer and a Jaguar Pace Car. The cars were launched in the 1970 season. The Todd Sweeney shell was later re-used by Corgi as a generic silver liveried "Superstock" car.
