= Scott Gates =

Scott Gates may refer to:

- Scott Gates (academic) (born 1957), American political scientist
- Scott Gates (footballer) (born 1988), German-born football player
