= William Haughey, Baron Haughey =

British businessman (born 1956)

The Right Honourable The Lord Haughey Kt OBE KSG
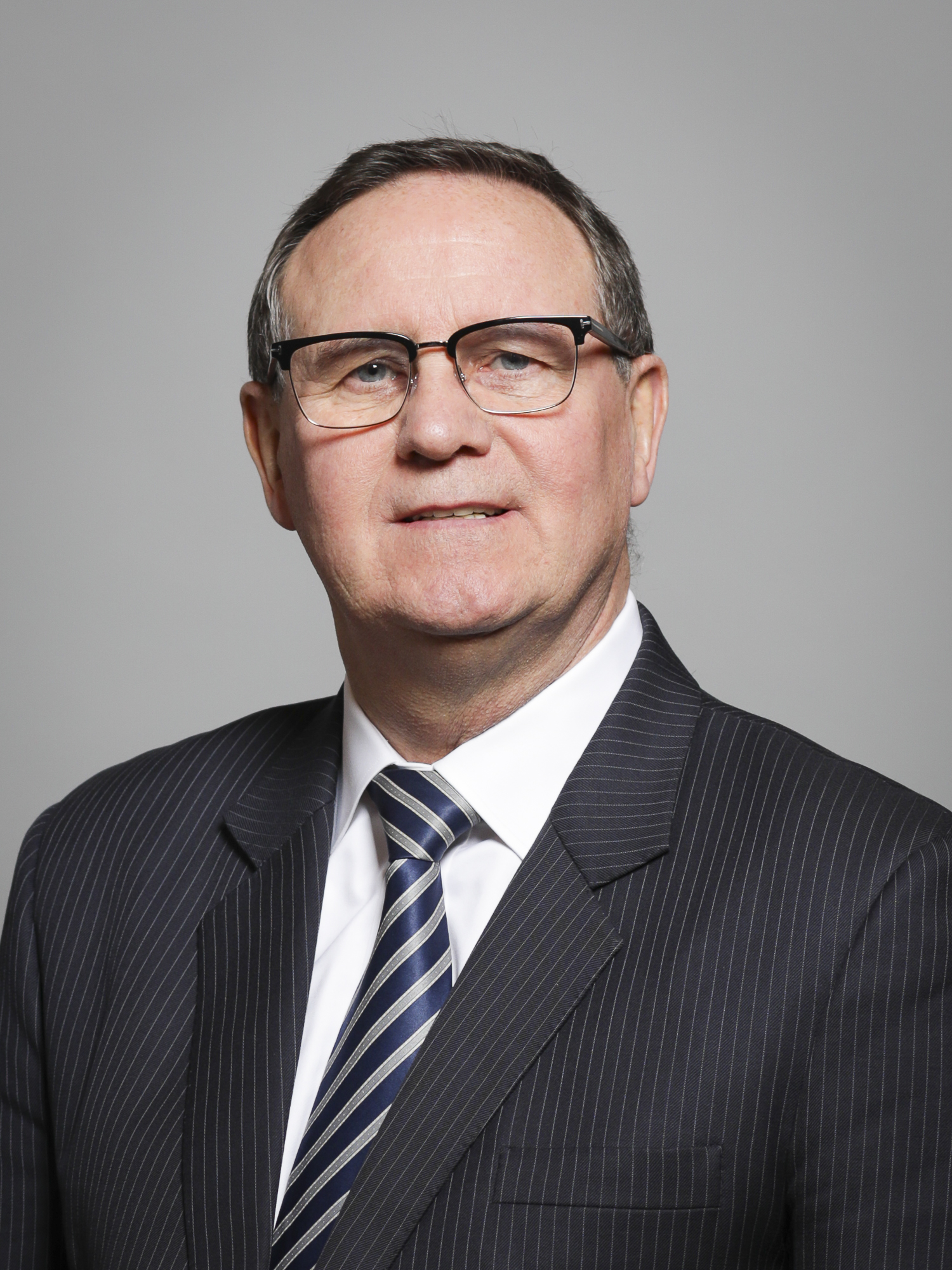
- Born: 2 July 1956; Gorbals, Glasgow, Scotland
- Occupations: Chairman, City Refrigeration Holdings UK Ltd

Member of the House of Lords
- Lord Temporal
- Life peerage 18 September 2013

Personal details
- Party: Labour
- Spouse: Susan Moore (m. 1978)
- Children: 1

William Haughey, Baron Haughey (born 2 July 1956) is a Scottish businessman, philanthropist and chair of City Facilities Management Holdings Ltd.

== Career ==
Haughey was educated at Holyrood Secondary School followed by Langside College. He then worked in the refrigeration and air-conditioning industry in Abu Dhabi before returning to Scotland to set up his own business with £70,000 of savings he had accrued. He founded City Refrigeration, a refrigeration equipment and maintenance supplier, with his wife Susan in 1985.

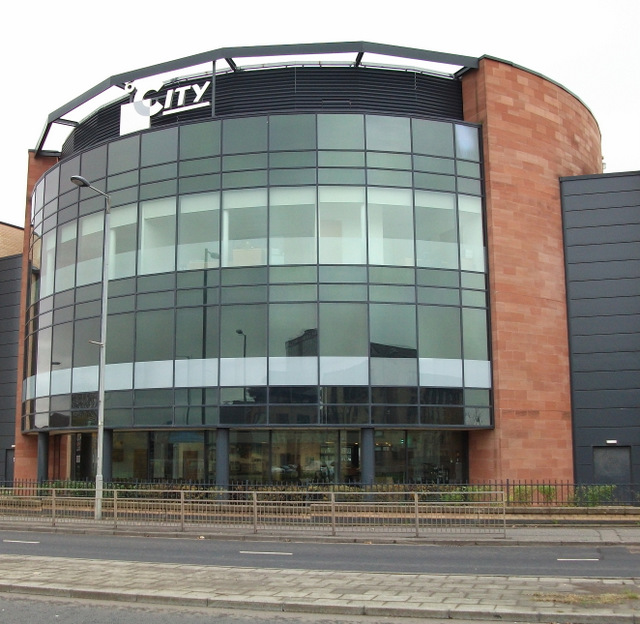
City Facilities Management headquarters in Glasgow

After securing a service contract with the Tennent's company in the 1980s which led to agreements with further breweries, he sold a majority stake to the 3i equity firm. A downturn in the financial situation caused Haughey to sell two other small companies he had established back to City to increase turnover and broaden the range of services provided by the firm. In 1997 the firm signed a deal with Asda to maintain refrigeration equipment in stores throughout the United Kingdom. Due to the success of that venture, Haughey and his wife found themselves able to buy back almost full control of City from 3i in 1999, allowing them to have decisive input on its future strategic direction; a gradual, continuous expansion of its operations followed over the subsequent decades.

He was part of a consortium, along with Dominic Keane, that bought Livingston in 2002. The West Lothian side were promoted to the Scottish Premier League within three years. The club's rise was short-lived as they were placed into administration on 3 February 2004. In August 2009, Keane was accused of defrauding lottery winner John McGuinness of £3m after a partnership to fund a new stand at Livingston FC went wrong. He was later cleared of all charges.

Haughey backed the Entrepreneurial Spark start-up accelerator, hosting the Glasgow 'hatchery' in his City Refrigeration Headquarters.

While the City technical division is located in Clydesmill Industrial Estate near to Cambuslang, its corporate headquarters are at Caledonia House in Gorbals, Glasgow, having relocated from nearby Shawfield in 2009 when those premises were demolished for construction of the M74 motorway completion. The new site was virtually on the site of Haughey's childhood home which had been demolished years earlier with the family moving on to the newly built Toryglen neighbourhood a short distance to the south.

By 2017, the company had been rebranded as City Facilities Management and launched a European arm, headquartered in Paris. Their international clients include Coles Supermarkets in Australia.

In 2020, Lord Haughey, who helped rescue Celtic from going into receivership in the early 1990s, flatly rejected suggestions that he was interested in a plan to acquire Rangers.

In 2023, The Times reported that Haughey had made negative comments about the use of heat pump technology to decarbonise home heating in Scotland, saying "I have a heat pump company and following Patrick Harvie's announcement, I should really be jumping for joy. But the truth of the matter is that heat pumps don't work as efficiently in Scotland as they do in other countries. The water can only be heated to 54C, which is lower than the Health and Safety Executive's recommended figure of 60C." Ben Bartle-Ross, a technician at Mitsubishi, criticised Haughey for his comments, saying "Lord Haughey claimed to have sold thousands of heat pumps but only for the right application, which he saw as air conditioning for heating in the winter and cooling in the summer."

== Personal life ==
Haughey married Susan in 1978; Lady Haughey was appointed Lord Lieutenant of Lanarkshire in 2017. He has one son Kenny. In his spare time he enjoys playing golf and tournament poker. He once revealed that he winds down every Friday night with a fish supper.

Haughey is a Celtic F.C. season ticket holder and was formerly a non-executive director of the club. He was close friends with former Celtic player Jimmy Johnstone before his death, and is a collector of club memorabilia, much of which (including the medal collections of Johnstone and Tommy Gemmell) he has loaned back to Celtic for display in their museum.

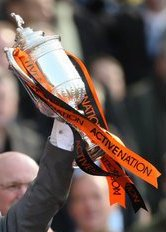
Haughey provided the sponsorship funds for the 'Active Nation Scottish Cup' in 2010.

Haughey also provided £2 million in funding to the Scottish Cup while the tournament did not have a main sponsor between 2008 and 2010, with the Scottish Government allowed to use the 'branding space' competition to promote their Homecoming Scotland 2009 and Active Nation initiatives.

Haughey gave over £5 million to charity over a five-year period. In January 2011 Haughey presented a cheque for £100,000 to UNICEF ambassador Sir Alex Ferguson to support the charity's work with child flood victims in Pakistan. In 2010 alone, he made charitable donations of £1.3 million.

Haughey donated over £1 million to the Labour Party between 2003 and 2010.

Haughey has been named in several newspaper reports in connection with the resignation of Steven Purcell, the leader of Glasgow City Council until 2010.

In 2011, Haughey had planning permission for the conversion of Greenleeshill Farm, situated on greenbelt land in South Lanarkshire, with panoramic views over Glasgow into a mansion resembling the White House US presidential residence.

The 2017 edition of the Sunday Times Rich List estimated Haughey's family's fortune at £265 million.

In 2018, Haughey was reported as having become involved in discussions between the Scottish Football Association and Queen's Park F.C. over the future use of Hampden Park, the stadium used by the former but owned by the latter. With the SFA threatening to move their matches to Edinburgh and unwilling to pay more than £2 million to buy Hampden from Queen's Park while the club demanded £6 million, Haughey stepped in with an offer to 'split the difference' by adding a contribution to raise the purchase offer to £4 million, in order for Scotland matches and cup finals to remain in their traditional Glasgow home. He had already donated funds to Queen's Park a decade earlier to help improve the facilities at their Lesser Hampden training ground, which would become the first team match venue in 2021 once the sale of the main stadium was completed.

== Honours and awards ==
Haughey was named "Entrepreneur of the Year for Scotland" in 2000. He was appointed an Officer of the Order of the British Empire (OBE) in the 2003 Birthday Honours for services to Entrepreneurship in the West of Scotland,

He received an honorary Doctor of Technology (Hon DTech) from Glasgow Caledonian University in November 2005 in recognition of his philanthropic contributions to the institution, and was also awarded the St Mungo Prize in 2007 for his distinguished service to the city of Glasgow.

Haughey was knighted in the 2012 Birthday Honours for services to business and philanthropy. On 1 August 2013, it was announced he was going to be a Labour peer in the House of Lords. Subsequently, on 18 September 2013 he was created a life peer taking the title Baron Haughey, of Hutchesontown in the City of Glasgow.

In 2018, Haughey received two awards, i.e. being elected overall winner of the "Ernst & Young Entrepreneur of the Year Scotland" and "UK Entrepreneur of the Year for Substained Excellence".

In 2023, Haughey and his wife Susan were honoured by Pope Francis with a papal knighthood in recognition of their charitable work for the Catholic Church in the Diocese of Motherwell, in Glasgow, across Scotland, and internationally; as such, he was made a Knight of the Order of St. Gregory the Great (KSG).

On 25 June 2025, the University of Strathclyde awarded him the honorary degree of Doctor of the University (DUniv, hc).

== Arms ==
Coat of arms of William Haughey, Baron Haughey
Escutcheon Per chevron flory of three on the upper edge Gules and Or.

Orders of precedence in the United Kingdom
Preceded by The Lord Verjee	Gentlemen; Baron Haughey	Followed by The Lord Balfe
