= John McGuinness (lottery winner) =

Scottish lottery winner

- Born: Shotts, North Lanarkshire, Scotland
- Known for: Winning the National Lottery in 1996

John McGuinness is a Scottish man who won the National Lottery in 1996.

== Lottery win ==
McGuinness is from Shotts and was working as an auxiliary nurse when he won £9.6m on the National Lottery in 1996. Following the win, he gifted £3m to his family and £750k to his ex-wife.

== Livingston FC ==
In 1998, McGuinness decided to invest almost £4m in Livingston after agreeing a deal with directors Dominic Keane and Willie Haughey. By 2009, McGuinness had lost his investment and remaining lottery winnings. Keane was the subject of a fraud trial, being accused of forging Haughey's signature to dupe McGuinness into signing an agreement to invest in the club. Keane was later cleared of all charges. However, he revealed during the trial that the financial crisis at Livingston had cost him his home and left him bankrupt.
