= 2011–12 Stirling Albion F.C. season =

Stirling Albion
2011–12 season
- Manager: Jocky Scott; Greig McDonald
- Stadium: Doubletree Dunblane Stadium
- Scottish Second Division: Tenth place
- Challenge Cup: Second round
- League Cup: First round
- Scottish Cup: Third round
- Top goalscorer: League: Scott Davidson (9); All: Scott Davidson (9)
- Highest home attendance: 709 vs. Dumbarton, 28 April 2012
- Lowest home attendance: 329 vs. Cowdenbeath, 21 February 2012

The 2011–12 season was Stirling Albion's first season back in the Scottish Second Division, having been relegated from the Scottish First Division at the end of the 2010–11 season. Stirling also competed in the Challenge Cup, League Cup and the Scottish Cup.

== Summary ==
Stirling finished tenth in the Second Division and were relegated to the Third Division. They reached the second round of the Challenge Cup, the first round of the League Cup and the third round of the Scottish Cup.

=== Management ===
They began the 2011–12 season under the management of Jocky Scott. In December 2011, Scott was sacked with Greig McDonald being appointed as caretaker manager. In January after two wins in three games he was appointed as manager, becoming the youngest manager in the United Kingdom at the age of 29.

== Results & fixtures ==
Win Draw Loss Postponed

=== Second Division ===
6 August 2011 Second Division	Stirling Albion	1–0	East Fife	Doubletree Dunblane Stadium
	Davidson 76'	BBC Report		Attendance: 688; Referee: Alan Muir

13 August 2011 Second Division	Dumbarton	1–5	Stirling Albion	Strathclyde Homes Stadium
	Agnew 8'	BBC Report	Smith 5'; Cook 46'; Flood 48'; Dillon 56'; Crawley 69'	Attendance: 706; Referee: Charlie Richmond

20 August 2011 Second Division	Stirling Albion	2–2	Albion Rovers	Doubletree Dunblane Stadium
	Jacobs 34'; Davieson 76' (pen.)	BBC Report	Chaplain 82'; Russell 88'	Attendance: 617; Referee: Northcroft

27 August 2011 Second Division	Arbroath	4–2	Stirling Albion	Gayfield Park
	McPherson 30' (o.g.); Doris 51' (pen.); Sheerin 56'; Swankie 65'	BBC Report	Cook 38'; Dillon 49'; Thom (red card)	Attendance: 670; Referee: Clancy

10 September 2011 Second Division	Stirling Albion	2–2	Stenhousemuir	Doubletree Dunblane Stadium
	Davieson 59'; Cook 89' (pen.)	BBC Report	Paton 39' (pen.); Thomson 69'	Attendance: 649; Referee: McKendrick

17 September 2011 Second Division	Stirling Albion	2–4	Forfar Athletic	Doubletree Dunblane Stadium
	Davieson 45' (pen.); Smith 83'	BBC Report	Shaughnessy 34'; Templeman 61', 78'; Low 75'	Attendance: 551; Referee: Charleston

24 September 2011 Second Division	Airdrie United	1–1	Stirling Albion	Excelsior Stadium
	Boyle 4'	BBC Report	Davieson 37'	Attendance: 709; Referee: Roache

1 October 2011 Second Division	Stirling Albion	1–0	Brechin City	Doubletree Dunblane Stadium
	Smith 19'	BBC Report	Lister (red card) 29'	Attendance: 555; Referee: Winter

15 October 2011 Second Division	Cowdenbeath	2–0	Stirling Albion	Central Park
15:00	Morton 33' (Penalty); McKenzie 47'	BBC Report		Attendance: 312; Referee: Hilland

22 October 2011 Second Division	East Fife	1–0	Stirling Albion	Bayview Stadium, Methil
	Wallace 88'	BBC Report		Attendance: 617; Referee: McDermott

29 October 2011 Second Division	Stirling Albion	0–1	Dumbarton	Doubletree Dunblane Stadium
		BBC Report	Agnew 84'	Attendance: 602; Referee: Northcroft

5 November 2011 Second Division	Stenhousemuir	4–0	Stirling Albion	Ochilview Park, Stenhousemuir
	Kean 54', 80'; McMillan 63'; Ferguson 69'	BBC Report		Attendance: 829; Referee: Clancy

12 November 2011 Second Division	Stirling Albion	0–1	Arbroath	Doubletree Dunblane Stadium
		BBC Report	Malcolm 90'	Attendance: 573; Referee: Allan

26 November 2011 Second Division	Forfar Athletic	P – P	Stirling Albion	Station Park

3 December 2011 Second Division	Stirling Albion	1–4	Airdrie United	Doubletree Dunblane Stadium
15:00	Bonar 45'	SFL Report	Donnelly 13', 58'; Lovering 29' (Penalty); McLaren 49'	Attendance: 711; Referee: Beaton

10 December 2011 Second Division	Brechin City	P – P	Stirling Albion	Glebe Park
15:00

17 December 2011 Second Division	Stirling Albion	P – P	Cowdenbeath	Forthbank Stadium
15:00

26 December 2011 Second Division	Arbroath	P – P	Stirling Albion	Gayfield Park, Arbroath
15:00

2 January 2012 Second Division	Stirling Albion	3–1	Stenhousemuir	Doubletree Dunblane Stadium
15:00	Cook 54'; Thom 69'; Flood 90'	SFL Report	Thomson 83'	Attendance: 578; Referee: Charleston

14 January 2012 Second Division	Albion Rovers	0–1	Stirling Albion	Cliftonhill
15:00		SFL Report	McLeish 11'; Crawley (red card) 90'	Attendance: 455; Referee: Allan

21 January 2012 Second Division	Stirling Albion	0–1	East Fife	Doubletree Dunblane Stadium
15:00		BBC Report	McCormack (red card) 20'; Wallace 51'	Attendance: 608; Referee: Murray

24 January 2012 Second Division	Forfar Athletic	2–2	Stirling Albion	Station Park
19:30	Coyne 21', 60'	SFL Report	McSorley 79'; Davidson 88'	Attendance: 361; Referee: McKendrick,

28 January 2012 Second Division	Airdrie United	4–1	Stirling Albion	Excelsior Stadium
15:00	Boyle 3'; Lovering 17'; McLaren 73'; Sally 84'	SFL Report	Allison (yellow card) 90' (red card); Weir 90'	Attendance: 730; Referee: Hilland

1 February 2012 Second Division	Arbroath	2–0	Stirling Albion	Gayfield Park, Arbroath
19:45	Doris 9'; Sheerin 45'	SFL Report		Attendance: 901; Referee: Charleston

4 February 2012 Second Division	Stirling Albion	P – P	Forfar Athletic	Doubletree Dunblane Stadium
15:00

11 February 2012 Second Division	Cowdenbeath	4–1	Stirling Albion	Central Park, Cowdenbeath
15:00	Coult 12', 48', 59'; McKenzie 84'	SFL Report	Thom 36'; McKenzie (red card) 91'	Attendance: 341; Referee: Northcroft

18 February 2012 Second Division	Stirling Albion	2–3	Brechin City	Doubletree Dunblane Stadium
15:00	Ferry 33'; McLean 75' (Own goal)	SFL Report	Ferry 53' (Own goal); Hodge 83'; McKenzie 87'	Attendance: 479; Referee: Collum

21 February 2012 Second Division	Stirling Albion	1–1	Cowdenbeath	Doubletree Dunblane Stadium
19:45	Thom 28'	SFL Report	Coult 56'	Attendance: 329; Referee: Somers

25 February 2012 Second Division	Dumbarton	4–1	Stirling Albion	Strathclyde Homes Stadium
15:00	Graham 46'; Agnew 73'; Gilhaney 80', 87'	SFL Report	Davidson 3'; Davidson (red card) 56'	Attendance: 722; Referee: Winter

28 February 2012 Second Division	Brechin City	1–3	Stirling Albion	Glebe Park
19:45	McManus 63'	SFL Report	Cook 42'; Ferry 44'; Thom 62'	Attendance: 362; Referee: O'Reilly

3 March 2012 Second Division	Stirling Albion	3–0	Albion Rovers	Doubletree Dunblane Stadium
15:00	Cook 20', 78'; Kelbie 23'	SFL Report		Attendance: 511; Referee: Clancy

6 March 2012 Second Division	Stirling Albion	2–2	Forfar Athletic	Doubletree Dunblane Stadium
19:45	Ferry 18'; McSorley 88'	SFL Report	Tulloch 62'; Templeman 65'; Hegarty (red card) 67'	Attendance: 371; Referee: Beaton

10 March 2012 Second Division	Stenhousemuir	4–0	Stirling Albion	Ochilview Park, Stenhousemuir
15:00	Kean 2'; Rodgers 55', 81'; Campbell 57'	SFL Report		Attendance: 674; Referee: Allan

17 March 2012 Second Division	Stirling Albion	1–1	Arbroath	Doubletree Dunblane Stadium
15:00	Davidson 20'	SFL Report	Falkingham 89'	Attendance: 537; Referee: McLean

24 March 2012 Second Division	Forfar Athletic	4–3	Stirling Albion	Station Park
15:00	Fotheringham 12'; Coyne 15'; Templeman 23'; Byers 90'	SFL Report	Kelbie 22'; Smith 63'; Ferry 89'	Attendance: 462; Referee: Roache

31 March 2012 Second Division	Stirling Albion	0–2	Airdrie United	Doubletree Dunblane Stadium
15:00		SFL Report	Donnelly 20', 31'	Attendance: 677; Referee: Finnie

7 April 2012 Second Division	Brechin City	1–2	Stirling Albion	Glebe Park
15:00	Buist 86'	SFL Report	Ferry 33'; Cook 82'	Attendance: 468; Referee: Hilland

14 April 2012 Second Division	Stirling Albion	0–2	Cowdenbeath	Doubletree Dunblane Stadium
15:00		SFL Report	Coult 6'; McKenzie 89'	Attendance: 568; Referee: Charleston

21 April 2012 Second Division	East Fife	1–0	Stirling Albion	Bayview Stadium
15:00	Wallace 90' (Penalty)	SFL Report		Attendance: 495; Referee: Tumilty

28 April 2012 Second Division	Stirling Albion	1–2	Dumbarton	Doubletree Dunblane Stadium
15:00	Davidson 57'	SFL Report	Jacobs 78' (Own goal); Dargo 90'	Attendance: 709; Referee: McDermott

5 May 2012 Second Division	Albion Rovers	1–2	Stirling Albion	Cliftonhill
15:00	Gemmell 5'	SFL Report	Day 61'; Brass 75'	Attendance: 462; Referee: Madden

=== Challenge Cup ===
23 July 2011 Challenge Cup Rd 1	Deveronvale	1–3	Stirling Albion	Princess Royal Park
	McKenzie 58'	BBC Report	Bonar 19' (pen.), 48'; McPherson 63'	Attendance: 400; Referee: Robertson

9 August 2011 Challenge Cup Rd 2	Livingston	5–0	Stirling Albion	Braidwood Motor Company Stadium
	Deuchar 23', 34', 90'; Jacobs 36' (o.g.); Thom 87' (o.g.)	BBC Report		Attendance: 549; Referee: Brines

=== League Cup ===
30 July 2011 Scottish League Cup Rd 1	Airdrie United	5–0	Stirling Albion	Excelsior Stadium
	Owens 32' (pen.), 78' (pen.); Donnelly 35', 81'; Bain 88'	BBC Report	Fagan (red card) 30'; Filler (red card) 78'	Attendance: 705; Referee: Hilland

=== Scottish Cup ===
19 November 2011 Scottish Cup round 3	Stirling Albion	1–2	Dundee	Doubletree Dunblane Stadium
15:00	Smith 26'	BBC Report	Conroy 31'; Steven Milne 61'	Attendance: 1,473; Referee: Salmond

== Player statistics ==
=== Squad ===
Last updated 5 May 2012

No.	Pos	Nat	Player	Total		Second Division		Scottish Cup		League Cup		Challenge Cup		
No.	Pos	Nat	Player	Apps	Goals	Apps	Goals	Apps	Goals	Apps	Goals	Apps	Goals	
	GK	(Scotland) SCO	Jamie Cleland	1	0	1	0	0	0	0	0	0	0	
	GK	(Scotland) SCO	Callum Reidford	23	0	22	0	1	0	0	0	0	0	
	GK	(England) ENG	Sam Filler	17	0	14	0	0	0	1	0	2	0	
	DF	(Scotland) SCO	Brian Allison	31	0	28	0	1	0	1	0	1	0	
	DF	(Scotland) SCO	John Crawley	32	1	29	1	0	0	1	0	2	0	
	DF	(Scotland) SCO	Shaun Dillon	17	3	17	2	0	0	0	0	0	1	0
	DF	(South Africa) RSA	Devon Jacobs	36	1	32	1	1	0	1	0	2	0	
	DF	(Scotland) SCO	Greg McDonald	2	0	1	0	1	0	0	0	0	0	
	DF	(Scotland) SCO	Gary Thom	38	4	34	4	1	0	1	0	2	0	
	DF	(Scotland) SCO	Ross McGeachie	1	0	1	0	0	0	0	0	0	0	
	MF	(Scotland) SCO	Danny Ashe	3	0	2	0	0	0	0	0	1	0	
	MF	(Scotland) SCO	Alan Cook	37	8	33	8	1	0	1	0	2	0	
	MF	(Scotland) SCO	Shaun Fagan	25	0	22	0	1	0	1	0	1	0	
	MF	(Scotland) SCO	Josh Flood	26	2	22	2	1	0	1	0	2	0	
	MF	(Scotland) SCO	Andy Hunter	1	0	0	0	0	0	0	0	1	0	
	MF	(Scotland) SCO	Gavin Macpherson	12	1	8	0	1	0	1	0	2	1	
	MF	(Scotland) SCO	Marc McCulloch	22	0	20	0	0	0	1	0	1	0	
	MF	(Scotland) SCO	Daly McSorley	28	2	25	2	1	0	1	0	1	0	
	MF	(Scotland) SCO	Craig McLeish	19	1	18	1	1	0	0	0	0	0	
	MF	(Scotland) SCO	Jamie McCunnie	8	0	8	0	0	0	0	0	0	0	
	MF	(Scotland) SCO	Mark Ferry	21	5	21	5	0	0	0	0	0	0	
	MF	(Scotland) SCO	Stephen Day	3	1	3	1	0	0	0	0	0	0	
	FW	(Scotland) SCO	Lewis Bonar	18	3	15	1	0	0	1	0	2	2	
	FW	(Scotland) SCO	Gary Brass	3	1	2	1	0	0	0	0	1	0	
	FW	(Scotland) SCO	Scott Davidson	37	9	33	9	1	0	1	0	2	0	
	FW	(Scotland) SCO	Darren Smith	36	5	33	4	1	1	1	0	1	0	
	FW	(Scotland) SCO	Steven Nicholas	11	0	10	0	1	0	0	0	0	0	
	FW	(Scotland) SCO	Graham Weir	17	1	17	1	0	0	0	0	0	0	
	FW	(Scotland) SCO	Kevin Kelbie	14	2	14	2	0	0	0	0	0	0	

=== Disciplinary record ===
Includes all competitive matches.

Last updated 5 May 2012

Nation	Position	Name	Second Division		Scottish Cup		League Cup		Challenge Cup		Total	
Nation	Position	Name	Booked	Sent off (straight red)	Booked	Sent off (straight red)	Booked	Sent off (straight red)	Booked	Sent off (straight red)	Booked	Sent off (straight red)
(Scotland)	GK	Jamie Cleland	0	0	0	0	0	0	0	0	0	0
(Scotland)	GK	Callum Reidford	1	0	0	0	0	0	0	0	1	0
(England)	GK	Sam Filler	1	0	0	0	0	1	0	0	1	1
(Scotland)	DF	Brian Allison	5	1	0	0	0	0	1	0	6	1
(Scotland)	DF	John Crawley	3	1	0	0	0	0	0	0	3	1
(Scotland)	DF	Shaun Dillon	4	0	0	0	0	0	0	0	4	0
(South Africa)	DF	Devon Jacobs	3	0	0	0	0	0	0	0	3	0
(Scotland)	DF	Greg McDonald	0	0	0	0	0	0	0	0	0	0
(Scotland)	DF	Gary Thom	10	1	0	0	0	0	0	0	10	1
(Scotland)	MF	Danny Ashe	0	0	0	0	0	0	0	0	0	0
(Scotland)	MF	Alan Cook	5	0	0	0	0	0	0	0	5	0
(Scotland)	MF	Shaun Fagan	8	0	1	0	0	1	1	0	10	1
(Scotland)	MF	Josh Flood	2	1	0	0	1	0	0	0	3	1
(Scotland)	MF	Andy Hunter	0	0	0	0	0	0	0	0	0	0
(Scotland)	MF	Gavin Macpherson	0	0	0	0	0	0	0	0	0	0
(Scotland)	MF	Marc McCulloch	4	0	0	0	0	0	1	0	5	0
(Scotland)	MF	Daly McSorley	5	0	0	0	0	0	0	0	5	0
(Scotland)	MF	Craig McLeish	0	0	0	0	0	0	0	0	0	0
(Scotland)	MF	Jamie McCunnie	0	0	0	0	0	0	0	0	0	0
(Scotland)	MF	Mark Ferry	2	0	0	0	0	0	0	0	2	0
(Scotland)	MF	Stephen Day	0	0	0	0	0	0	0	0	0	0
(Scotland)	FW	Lewis Bonar	1	0	0	0	0	0	0	0	1	0
(Scotland)	FW	Gary Brass	0	0	0	0	0	0	0	0	0	0
(Scotland)	FW	Scott Davidson	5	1	0	0	1	0	0	0	6	1
(Scotland)	FW	Darren Smith	2	0	0	0	0	0	0	0	2	0
(Scotland)	FW	Graham Weir	4	0	0	0	0	0	0	0	4	0
(Scotland)	FW	Kevin Kelbie	1	0	0	0	0	0	0	0	1	0

== Team statistics ==
=== League table ===
Pos	Team	Pld	W	D	L	GF	GA	GD	Pts	Promotion, qualification or relegation
6	East Fife	36	14	6	16	55	57	−2	48	
7	Forfar Athletic	36	11	9	16	59	72	−13	42	
8	Brechin City	36	10	11	15	47	62	−15	41	
9	Albion Rovers (O)	36	10	7	19	43	66	−23	37	Qualification for Second Division play-offs
10	Stirling Albion (R)	36	9	7	20	46	70	−24	34	Relegation to the Third Division

Source: SPFL Archive
Rules for classification: 1) points; 2) goal difference; 3) number of goals scored.
(O) Play-off winners; (R) Relegated

== Transfers ==
=== Players in ===
Player	From	Fee
(England) Sam Filler	(Scotland) Stirling University	Free
(Scotland) John Crawley	(Scotland) Thorniewood United	Free
(Scotland) Marc McCulloch	(Scotland) East Fife	Free
(Scotland) Scott Davidson	(Scotland) Falkirk	Loan
(Scotland) Shaun Fagan	(Scotland) East Fife	Free
(Scotland) Shaun Dillon	(Scotland) Pollok	Free
(Scotland) Lewis Bonar	(Scotland) Falkirk	Free
(South Africa) Devon Jacobs	(Scotland) Livingston	Free
(Scotland) Alan Cook	(Scotland) Dumbarton	Free
(Scotland) Darren Smith	(Scotland) Stirling Albion	Free
(Scotland) Craig McLeish	(Scotland) Falkirk	Free
(Scotland) Stevie Nicholas	Unattached	Free
(Scotland) Gavin MacPherson	(Scotland) Falkirk	Free
(Scotland) Gary Thom	(Scotland) Stenhousemuir	Free
(Scotland) William Kerr	(Scotland) Arkleston Amateurs	Free
(Scotland) Scott Davidson	(Scotland) Falkirk	Free
(Scotland) Mark Ferry	(Scotland) Raith Rovers	Free
(Scotland) Graham Weir	(Scotland) Brechin City	Free
(Scotland) Kevin Kelbie	(Northern Ireland) Glenavon F.C.	Free
(Scotland) Jamie McCunnie	(Iceland) Íþróttafélag Reykjavíkur	Free

=== Players out ===
Player	To	Fee
(Scotland) Scott Robertson	(Iceland) Fram Reykjavik	Free
(Scotland) Andy Gibson	(Scotland) Glasgow Perthshire	Free
(Scotland) Ross Forsyth	(Scotland) Greenock Morton	Free
(Scotland) Chris Aitken	(Scotland) Stranraer	Free
(Scotland) Tom Brighton	(Scotland) Queen of the South	Free
(Scotland) Ryan Borris	(Scotland) Stirling Albion	Free
(Scotland) Scott Buist	(Scotland) Brechin City	Free
(Scotland) Martyn Corrigan	(Scotland) Stenhousemuir	Free
(Scotland) Paul McHale	(Scotland) Stenhousemuir	Free
(Scotland) John Kane	(Scotland) Stranraer	Free
(Scotland) Michael Mullen	Free agent	Free
(Scotland) Scott Christie	(Scotland) Bo'ness United	Free
(Scotland) Gary Brass	(Scotland) Camelon Juniors	Loan
(Scotland) Danny Ashe	(Scotland) Sauchie	Loan
(Scotland) Andy Hunter	(Scotland) Dunipace	Loan
(Scotland) William Kerr	(Scotland) Arkleston	Free
(Scotland) Steven Nicholas	(Scotland) Ballingry Rovers	Loan
(Scotland) Lewis Bonar	(Australia) Peninsula Power	Free
