= Pearse Flynn =

Irish businessman

- Born: Ballycotton, Ireland
- Occupation: Businessperson

Pearse Flynn is an Irish businessman, who was previously the owner of Scottish football club Livingston.

== Early life ==
Flynn was born in Ballycotton, County Cork. He studied at University College Cork and University of Limerick.

== Business career ==
He began working in a marketing role with Newbridge Networks in 1999. After 10 months in that role, Flynn was appointed president and chief operating officer. He later sold the company to Alcatel. Flynn went on to become chief executive officer of German company Damovo before starting Contact4U.

Flynn purchased Glasgow-based insolvency company Creditfix in 2007. The company expanded in 2018 as it opened a new office in Greater Manchester.

In October 2018, he announced plans to open several businesses, including a craft shop, art venue and restaurant, in his hometown of Ballycotton. The businesses opened in February 2020.

Flynn announced his latest business venture, Green Rebel Marine, in September 2020. The Cork-based company, which acquired Crosshaven Boatyard, was formed to undertake surveys for offshore windfarms.

He won the Cork Person of the Month award in November 2022.

As of October 2025, Flynn owned restaurant and hospitality group Flynn Cush Ltd based in County Cork. Two of the restaurants owned by the group, The Salty Dog and Sea Church, won awards at the Georgina Campbell Irish Food and Hospitality Awards.

== Football ownership ==
In May 2005, Flynn was part of the Lionheart consortium, along with Maurice Smith and Tony Kinder, which completed a takeover of Scottish club Livingston. The club had previously been in administration, with the takeover ensuring they avoided a points deduction in the 2005-06 season.

Following Livi's relegation from the Scottish Premier League, Flynn sold the club to an Italian consortium fronted by lawyer Angelo Massone in June 2008. Flynn launched a legal action to recover over £300k he claims he had loaned the club the previous season.

In an interview with the Daily Record in July 2012, Flynn apologised to Livingston supporters for selling the club to Massone, which ultimately led to the West Lothian side's near demise.
