= Steve Monk =

British motor racing driver

- Occupation: motor racing driver
- Known for: World Superstox Champion 1974

Steve Monk was a British motor racing driver who competed in Superstox in the 1970s and early 1980s.

In the sport of Superstox racing he is noted as being the first driver to have held all four of the major championship titles (World, European, British and English titles) at some point during his career.

1974 - World Champion (Wimbledon Stadium)
1975 - British Champion (Aldershot Raceway)
1976 - European Champion (Posterholt Circuit, Netherlands)
1978 - English Champion (Wimbledon Stadium)

He achieved all the championship wins in self built/maintained machinery.

During the 1972 season he was a member of the Wimbledon Dons Auto Speedway team.
