= Dene Shields =

Scottish footballer

Personal information
- Date of birth: 16 September 1982 (age 44)
- Place of birth: Edinburgh, Scotland
- Position: Striker

Team information
- Current team: Brechin City

Senior career*
Years	Team	Apps	(Gls)
1999–2000	Raith Rovers	8	(1)
2000–2003	Sunderland	0	(0)
2001–2002	→ Scarborough (loan)	19	(12)
2002	→ Doncaster Rovers (loan)	4	(0)
2003	Raith Rovers	13	(2)
2003	Brechin City	2	(1)
2003–2005	→ Cowdenbeath	31	(12)
2003–2005	Cowdenbeath	18	(8)
2005–2007	Gretna	23	(09)
2005–2006	→ Stranraer (loan)	10	(1)
2006	→ Stirling Albion (loan)	17	(12)
2007–2009	Ross County	45	(21)
2008	→ East Fife (loan)	9	(0)
2010	Raith Rovers	9	(0)
2010–2012	Hamrun Spartans	35	(23)
2012–2015	Xewkija Tigers	100	(93)
2015–2016	Brechin City	8	(4)
2018–	Brechin City	4	(2)
- * Club domestic league appearances and goals as of 13:29, 3 October 2018 (UTC)

Dene Shields (born 16 September 1982) is a Scottish professional footballer who plays as a striker for Brechin City. Shields has played for thirteen separate clubs in Scotland, England and Malta, in a career spanning three decades.

== Career ==
=== Raith & Sunderland ===
Beginning his career in Kirkcaldy with Raith Rovers, Shields scored in his first full start for the side in a match against Airdrieonians. After a successful start for The Rovers, Shields earned a move to Sunderland in December 2000, in a deal thought to be worth up to £100,000. Despite spending three years at the Stadium of Light, Shields never made a first-team appearance and was loaned to Scarborough scoring nine goals and then to Doncaster Rovers during his time in England. In January 2003, Shields returned to Raith on a free transfer, two years after leaving.

=== Brechin, Cowdenbeath & Gretna ===
Released after only spending a few months on his return as club went into administration Stark's Park, Shields joined Brechin City at the start of the 2003–04 season, only to move on loan closer to his home town Cowdenbeath. Cowden made the move permanent in early 2004, tying Shields to a two-and-a-half-year contract.

A year later, Cowdenbeath chairman Gordon McDougall said it would take an "exceptional offer" to sell Shields after interest from Gretna and Hearts, and it was Gretna's offer that saw Shields move to the Scottish Borders club in January 2005, where he made only three substitute appearances in what was the remainder of Gretna's title-winning season. He took part in the side's historic Scottish Cup run, playing in the Scottish cup Semi-final at Hampden park against Dundee.

Shields was loaned to Scottish First Division side Stranraer in the first few weeks of the 2005–06 season. On his return to Raydale Park, Shields played nine matches of Gretna's second successive title win, missing out on a winner's medal by one match. Shields was loaned out again at the start of the following season, this time to Stirling Albion, scoring nine goals in eighteen games, and although he played one match for Gretna on his return, it was to be his last before a January 2007 move to Ross County.

=== Ross County, East Fife & Raith ===
Shields spent two and half years in Dingwall winning the Scottish Second Division, scoring fourteen goals in thirty-six appearances. In September 2008, Shields made East Fife his eleventh club when he joined on loan for the rest of the year, failing to score in ten appearances for the Methil side. On 19 February 2010 after being a free agent he re-signed for Raith Rovers.

=== Malta ===
Shields signed for Hamrun Spartans in the Maltese Premier League in August 2010, spending two seasons with the side and scoring eighteen goals in twenty-eight games. Shields then signed for Xewkija Tigers in the Gozo First Division. In his first season with the club Shields scored eighteen goals, finishing as the side top scorer. His second season with The Tigers ended in a similar fashion to the first, with Shields again scoring eighteen goals in eighteen matches. In his final season with Xewkija, Shields helped the club win their seventh league title, scoring in a match against Kerċem Ajax.

=== Return to Scotland ===
After five years in Malta, Shields returned to Scotland signing for Scottish League One side Brechin City for a second time. Shields lasted only six months in his homeland, leaving the club in January 2016 to return to Malta for personal reasons, making his final appearance in a league match against Stenhousemuir which was abandoned after 45 minutes. Shields made 9 appearances for the city, scoring 2 goals.

== Statistics ==
As of 17 January 2016

Club performance			League		Cup		League Cup		Total	
Season	Club	League	Apps	Goals	Apps	Goals	Apps	Goals	Apps	Goals
Scotland			League		Scottish Cup		League Cup		Total	
1999–00	Raith Rovers	Scottish First Division	1	0	-		-		1	0
2000–01	Raith Rovers	Scottish First Division	7	1	-		1	0	8	1
England			League		FA Cup		League Cup		Total	
2000–01	Sunderland	Premier League	-		-		-		0	0
2001–02	Sunderland	Premier League	-		-		-		0	0
2001–02	Scarborough (loan)	Conference	9	2	-		-		9	2
2002–03	Sunderland	Premier League	-		-		-		0	0
2002–03	Doncaster Rovers (loan)	Conference	4	0	-		-		4	0
Scotland			League		Scottish Cup		League Cup		Total	
2002–03	Raith Rovers	Scottish Second Division	13	2	-		-		13	2
2003–04	Brechin City	Scottish First Division	2	0	-		-		2	0
2003–04	Cowdenbeath (loan)	Scottish Third Division	31	12	3	3	2	0	36	15
2004–05	Cowdenbeath	Scottish Third Division	18	8	1	0	1	0	20	8
2004–05	Gretna	Scottish Third Division	3	0	-		-		3	0
2005–06	Gretna	Scottish Second Division	9	3	3	0	-		12	3
2005–06	Stranraer (loan)	Scottish First Division	10	1	-		1	0	11	1
2006–07	Stirling Albion (loan)	Scottish Second Division	17	8	1	1	1	0	19	9
2006–07	Ross County	Scottish First Division	14	0	-		-		14	0
2007–08	Ross County	Scottish Second Division	22	14	3	3	1	0	26	8
2008–09	Ross County	Scottish First Division	1	0	-		-		1	0
2008–09	East Fife	Scottish Second Division	9	0	1	0	-		10	0
2009–10	Raith Rovers	Scottish First Division	9	0	1	0	-		10	0
2015–16	Brechin City	Scottish League One	8	2	0	0	1	0	9	2
Career total			188	44	13	7	8	0	236	88

== Personal life ==
His younger brother is Jay Shields, who is also a footballer.
