= Morris Smith =

Morris Smith may refer to:

- Morris Smith of Magellan Fund
- Morris H. Smith

== See also ==
- Maurice Smith (disambiguation)
- Cristiane de Morais Smith (physicist)
