= Neil Rankine =

- Occupation: Businessman

Neil Rankine is a Scottish businessman who was previously a shareholder of professional football clubs Livingston, East Fife and Dumbarton.

== Career ==
He had several business interests, including the Coasters Group in Falkirk.

Rankine became the majority shareholder of Dumbarton in 1989, providing the club with a six figure transfer budget and aimed to guide the club to the Premier Division. In 2008, he sold his shares to the Brabco consortium, fronted by Callum and Andrew Hosie. Rankine left Dumbarton with the club in League One.

In July 2009, Rankine, Ged Nixon, Andy Gemmell and Gordon McDougall were part of Livingston 5 Consortium that bought Livingston, who were facing a financial crisis under the ownership of Italian lawyer Angelo Massone. While Livingston seemed doomed, a meeting with the Scottish Football League on 30 July 2009 secured their future, as an agreement was reached to allow Rankine, Nixon and McDougall to run the club for the following season. The next day, Massone sold his shares to the Livingston 5 Constortium and left the club.

Livi were fined £5,000 and given a registration ban for breaking SFA rules in April 2015. This related to the dual interest rules after they were found to have breached four SFA rules due to Rankine's involvement with East Fife.

The West Lothian club released a statement in January 2024 referencing claims made by Rankine that he was owed approximately £1m by Livingston. In the statement, then club chairman John Ward claimed that a forensic investigation into the club accounts uncovered fraudulent activity committed by Rankine.
