= Damovo =

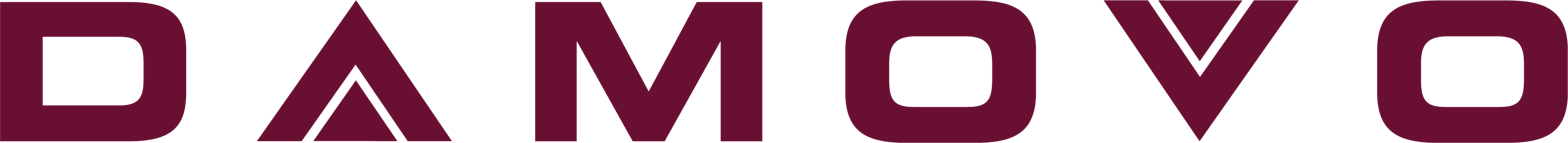
- Type: Private company
- Industry: Telecommunications
- Founded: 2001 in Düsseldorf, Germany
- Owner: Global Growth

Damovo is a multinational technology services company headquartered in Europe. It provides solutions in unified communications and collaboration, enterprise networks, cybersecurity, contact centers, cloud services, and global managed services. The company operates across Europe, the Americas, and the Asia–Pacific region, offering support in more than 150 countries through partnerships with vendors including Avaya, Cisco, Microsoft, Extreme Networks, Genesys, and Mitel. Damovo originated in 2001 as a spin-off from Ericsson’s direct sales and service operations and has expanded internationally through acquisitions and investment.

== History ==
Damovo was formerly a division of the Swedish telecoms group Ericsson. In 2001, the London-based Apax Partners acquired and spun off the direct sales and service operations division into a separate company in a management buy out led by Pearse Flynn. At the time Damovo was based in Glasgow, Scotland. Flynn was chief executive of the company until 2003. In December 2006, Apax handed over its entire equity stake in the company to its creditors.

In January 2015, Damovo Europe was acquired by Oakley Capital Equity II. Matthew Riley, founder of the Daisy Group, was appointed Executive Chairman. Damovo UK was also acquired by Daisy in a separate deal.

In August 2015, Damovo acquired the voice and unified communications business of Centre de Télécommunications et Téléinformatiques Luxembourgeois (CTTL) in Luxembourg. This was the first acquisition by Damovo, since it was acquired by Oakley Capital earlier in the year.

In November 2016, Damovo completed the acquisition of Netfarmers GmbH – a Germany-based company focused in unified communications, security and networking. In June 2017, Damovo acquired of Swiss-based Voice & Data Network AG (Vodanet).

Damovo was acquired by the American investment fund Global Growth in July 2018.
