= Allan Creer =

Scottish footballer (born 1986)

Personal information
- Date of birth: 12 November 1986 (age 39)
- Place of birth: Rutherglen, Scotland
- Height: 6 ft 4 in (1.93 m)
- Position: Goalkeeper

Youth career
- 2003–2004: Livingston

Senior career*
Years	Team	Apps	(Gls)
2004–2005	Forfar Athletic	5	(0)
2005–2006	Albion Rovers	4	(0)
2006–2008	Alloa Athletic	48	(0)
2008	Ross County	4	(0)
2008-2009	Kilsyth Rangers		
2009	Hill of Beath Hawthorn		
2009-2010	Lanark United		
- * Club domestic league appearances and goals as of 18 October 2008

Allan Creer (born 12 November 1986) is a Scottish footballer who plays as a goalkeeper. He last played for Ross County.

He joined Alloa from Albion Rovers in January 2006, in direct exchange for Gary McGlynn, having previously played for Dundee United, Livingston and Wishaw Juniors F.C. Following a match in March 2007, Creer was disciplined by his club for reacting to fans after a 4–0 defeat by opponents Stirling Albion.

Creer was released by Alloa in January 2008 and then signed a short-term deal with Ross County in February 2008. He played in four league games, but was heavily criticised for his performance in a 4–2 defeat by Ayr United. He did not play again for Ross County and was released at the end of the 2007–08 season.

He then had spells at Kilsyth Rangers, Hill of Beath Hawthorn and Lanark United before retiring in 2010.
