= Maurice Smith (businessman) =

Scottish businessman

- Born: Maurice Alan Smith; 1960 (age 64–65); Scotland
- Occupation(s): Businessman, Producer, Media Consultant

Maurice Smith (born 1960) is a Scottish businessman and a previous director of professional football club Livingston.

== Career ==
During his career, Smith has worked as a media consultant and business editor with BBC Scotland.

In May 2005, Smith was part of the Lionheart consortium, along with Pearse Flynn and Tony Kinder, which completed a takeover of Scottish club Livingston. The club had previously been in administration, with the takeover ensuring they avoided a points deduction in the 2005-06 season. However, he resigned from his role with the club in November 2008.

Smith was the executive producer on a documentary titled ‘Linoleum: The Sweet Smell of Success’ in 2017. The documentary makers were TVI Vision, of which Smith is a director.
