= Brian Fairbairn =

Scottish footballer (born 1998)

Personal information
- Date of birth: 7 April 1983 (age 43)
- Place of birth: Broxburn, Scotland
- Position: Midfielder

Youth career
- 1999-2000: Livingston

Senior career*
Years	Team	Apps	(Gls)
2000-2002	Livingston	0	(0)
2002-2003	East Stirling	13	(2)
2003	Gretna	13	(2)
2003-2005	East Fife	55	(9)
2005-2007	Raith Rovers	56	(6)
2007-2008	Alloa	9	(0)
2008	Berwick Rangers	13	(1)
2008-2011	Cowdenbeath	72	(10)
2011	Hibernians	6	(1)
2011-2013	Bathgate		
2013-2016	Broxburn Athletic		
- * Club domestic league appearances and goals

Brian Fairbairn (born 7 April 1983) is a Scottish former professional footballer who played as a midfielder for Hibernians and Cowdenbeath.

== Club career ==
=== Livingston ===
Fairbairn came through the youth ranks at Livingston, but left the club without making a single first team appearance.

=== East Stirling and Gretna ===
He signed for East Stirling in 2002, making his league debut in a 1-1 draw against Greenock Morton.

The midfielder scored 2 goals in 13 appearances for the Shire before leaving in January 2003 to sign for Gretna, where he also netted twice in 13 appearances in a short spell at the club in the second half of the 2002/2003 season.

=== East Fife and Raith Rovers ===
Fairbairn signed for East Fife in 2003. He scored on his league debut in a 3-2 win over Stenhousemuir. He scored 9 goals in 55 league appearances before earning a move to Raith Rovers.

He enjoyed 2 seasons at the Rovers before leaving to sign for Alloa.

=== Alloa, Berwick Rangers and Cowdenbeath ===
He turned out 7 times for the Wasps before signing for Berwick Rangers where he scored once in 13 league appearances.

The midfield man signed for Cowdenbeath in 2008 and enjoyed a successful spell at the club, helping the club to successive promotions from Scottish Football League Third Division in 2008-2009 and from Scottish Football League Second Division in 2009-2010.

=== Hibernians, Bathgate and Broxburn ===
In 2011, Fairbairn signed for Maltese side Hibernians.

The spell abroad was short lived and after 6 months, he returned home to Scotland to sign for Bathgate.

Fairbairn then signed for Broxburn Athletic in 2014. He initially left the club in 2015, but resigned for the Brox in 2016.

== Honours ==
Cowdenbeath

- Scottish Third Division runner up: 2008-2009
- Scottish Second Division runner up: 2009-2010
