= Daniel Moore (footballer) =

Scottish footballer

Personal information
- Full name: Daniel Robert Moore
- Date of birth: 11 October 1988 (age 38)
- Place of birth: Inverness, Scotland
- Positions: Defender; midfielder

Youth career
- 2001–2006: Ross County

Senior career*
| Years | Team | Apps | (Gls) |
| 2006–2010 | Ross County | 37 | (2) |
| 2008–2009 | → Peterhead (loan) | 33 | (2) |
| 2010–2011 | Peterhead | 26 | (0) |
| 2011–2013 | Elgin City | 64 | (8) |
| 2013–2014 | Nairn County | | |
| 2014–2017 | Elgin City | 103 | (6) |
| 2017–2018 | Rothes | | |
- * Club domestic league appearances and goals as of 13 August 2017

Daniel Robert Moore (born 11 October 1988) is a Scottish retired footballer. Most recently, he was with Highland League club Rothes in the dual role of player/Assistant Manager.

He has previously played for Ross County, Peterhead, Nairn County and Elgin City.
