= Stephen Manson =

Scottish footballer

Personal information
- Date of birth: 25 February 1986 (age 40)
- Place of birth: Edinburgh, Scotland
- Position: Midfielder

Youth career
- Hibernian

Senior career*
Years	Team	Apps	(Gls)
–2006	Falkirk	1	(0)
2006	→ Berwick Rangers (loan)	10	(2)
2006–2007	Raith Rovers	13	(1)
2007–2008	Sligo Rovers	30	(4)
2008	Cowdenbeath	7	(2)
2008–2009	Forfar Athletic	17	(7)
2009–2013	Linlithgow Rose	163	(47)
- * Club domestic league appearances and goals

Stephen Manson (born 25 February 1986) is a Scottish former professional footballer.

== Career ==
He previously played for Falkirk, Berwick Rangers (on loan), Raith Rovers and Sligo Rovers in the League of Ireland.
