= Angelo Massone =

Italian Lawyer

- Born: Italy
- Occupation: Lawyer

Angelo Massone is an Italian lawyer best known for his controversial spell as owner of Scottish football club Livingston.

== Career ==
=== Ownership of Livingston FC ===
In 2008, Massone was part of an Italian consortium that became majority shareholders of Scottish football club Livingston. Another member of the consortium was Tommaso Angelini, the son-in-law of former Livi manager David Hay.

On 30 June 2009, the club faced a deadline to clear unpaid debts to West Lothian Council who owned Almondvale Stadium. After that was not met, legal proceedings were carried out against the club to come to an arrangement over the debt within fourteen days or potentially face again going into administration.

Livingston were placed into administration on 24 July 2009 by the Court of Session in Edinburgh, and faced relegation to the Third Division, a points deduction or being removed from the Scottish Football League entirely.

On 27 July 2009, it was revealed that the club were likely to go into liquidation after Massone said he would refuse a £25,000 offer for the club from their administrator. On 28 July 2009, Massone yet again refused the offer and the administrator subsequently started the liquidation process. On 30 July 2009, a meeting with the Scottish Football League secured their future, as they agreed to allow prospective new owners Gordon McDougall, Ged Nixon and Neil Rankine, part of the Livingston 5 Consortium, to run the club for the following season. The following day, Massone sold his shares to the new owners and left the club.

Previous majority shareholder, Pearse Flynn, apologised to supporters in 2012 for selling the club to Massone, and claimed the Italian still owed him money to cover his legal costs. This related to a court case for a loan of £330k which Flynn claims he is owed by Livingston Football Club.

=== Failed bids ===
In May 2010, Massone claimed to be in the process of buying Italian club AC Ancona. At this time, he also expressed an interest in buying Scottish club Kilmarnock. However, his planned takeover did not materialise.

Massone submitted a bid of around £4.5m to controversial Hearts owner Vladimir Romanov in November 2012, following a winding-up order issued to the Edinburgh club over a £450k tax bill. However, his bid was quickly turned down by the club, as they believed he "may not be the right person to take the club forward".

In an interview with the Scotsman in July 2012, Gordon McDougall, Massone's successor as Livingston chairman, branded the Italian 'a thief' and believed he should be banned for life from being involved in Scottish football. Similarly, former Livingston and Hearts goalkeeper, Roddy McKenzie, described Massone as a bully and insisted he was a 'million times worse' than Vladimir Romanov.

=== FC Ceahlaul ===
In February 2015, Massone became the majority shareholder of Romanian side CSM Ceahlăul Piatra Neamț.

Once again, controversy ensued as Massone sacked manager Zé Maria twice in one week. Players' wages were also withheld for two months following threats of a strike, which Massone was reported to have described as a 'slaves revolt'.

By November 2016, Ceahlaul had debts of around €1.7m and had no first team manager. Massone insisted that the insolvency of the club was the only solution to save Ceahlaul, claiming that it should be seen as a new beginning.

With uncertain finances, unpaid players, six coaches changed in a season and poor transfer business, the club withdrew from the league with a few matches to go until the end of the season and were relegated. With their financial problems unmanageable, the club was dissolved in 2016.

== Personal life ==
In July 2012, Massone was fined £800 for a drink driving offence.
