= Andrew Barrowman =

Scottish footballer (born 1984)

Andy Barrowman
Personal information
- Full name: Andrew Barrowman
- Date of birth: 27 November 1984 (age 41)
- Place of birth: Wishaw, Scotland
- Height: 6 ft 0 in (1.83 m)
- Position: Striker

Team information
- Current team: Raith Rovers (chief executive)

Youth career
- 1997–2001: Rangers
- 2001–2003: Birmingham City

Senior career*
Years	Team	Apps	(Gls)
2003–2006	Birmingham City	1	(0)
2003	→ Crewe Alexandra (loan)	4	(1)
2004	→ Blackpool (loan)	2	(0)
2005	→ Mansfield Town (loan)	3	(0)
2006	Walsall	13	(1)
2006–2007	Kilmarnock	3	(0)
2006	→ Queen of the South (loan)	12	(0)
2007	Queen of the South	12	(1)
2007–2008	Ross County	33	(24)
2008–2010	Inverness Caledonian Thistle	30	(2)
2010–2011	Ross County	32	(10)
2011–2013	Dunfermline Athletic	44	(13)
2013	Dundee	1	(0)
2013–2014	Livingston	19	(5)
2014–2015	Greenock Morton	15	(3)
2015	Dunfermline Athletic	13	(2)
2015–2016	Albion Rovers	22	(4)
2018	Arthurlie	8	(3)
Total		259	(66)

International career
2003	Scotland U19	2	(0)
- * Club domestic league appearances and goals

Andrew Barrowman (born 27 November 1984) is a Scottish retired professional footballer, who played as a striker. A journeyman, Barrowman played for 15 different sides during his career, including Inverness Caledonian Thistle, Ross County and Dunfermline Athletic in Scotland and Birmingham City and Walsall in England.

He spent two years as sporting director of Kelty Hearts before becoming chief executive of Raith Rovers in 2023.

== Career ==
=== Birmingham City ===
Barrowman was born in Wishaw, North Lanarkshire. He joined Birmingham City at the age of 16, having been with Rangers for four years as a schoolboy. In 2002, he represented Scotland under-19s in the first qualifying round for the 2003 UEFA European Under-19 Championship. He had previously represented Scotland at other youth levels.

He signed his first senior contract at Birmingham for the start of the 2003–04 season, but made his debut in the Football League as a Crewe Alexandra player, in a match against Bradford City on 14 October 2003, after signing on a month-long loan. He hit his first goal in his next match, a 3–0 victory against Derby County four days later.

Between November and the close of the season, he played once in the Premier League for Birmingham City, at home against Leicester City. In the summer of 2004, his contract was renewed.

Loaned to Blackpool for the first three months of the 2004–05 season, Barrowman made his debut against Sheffield Wednesday, coming on as a substitute in a 2–1 home loss. He walked out on the club after another substitute appearance.

=== Walsall ===
Barrowman would prove never to become a regular squad member at St Andrew's. In January 2006 he signed for Walsall. He made his debut in a 5–0 defeat to Brentford, which proved to be the final act of manager Paul Merson's spell as manager. Barrowman gave away a penalty in this game with a "bizarre handball" with the score at 4–0. His fortunes improved the week after when he helped to rescue a point on his home debut against Scunthorpe United. With Walsall down to ten men, Barrowman latched onto a long ball and lobbed the goalkeeper to make it 2–2.

=== Return to Scotland ===
On 26 July 2006, Barrowman returned to Scotland and signed a one-year contract with Scottish Premier League club Kilmarnock, but after initially failing to break into the first team he joined Queen of the South on a month's loan during September. This loan deal was subsequently extended until the end of December. On 1 February 2007, after his release from Rugby Park, he signed a short-term contract with Queen of the South until the end of the season.

Barrowman scored once for Queen of the South, his goal coming in a 2–2 draw against future club Dundee on 17 March 2007. He signed for Ross County for the 2007–08 season. He hit terrific form during his first season with County, scoring a total of 29 goals, 24 in the league, which helped the club to win the Second Division championship. In late May he turned down a contract extension with County in the hope of moving to a bigger club. Inverness Caledonian Thistle manager Craig Brewster captured his main transfer target on 25 June 2008 when, after much deliberation, Barrowman committed himself to a three-year contract with the club. He scored on his league debut in a 2–0 win over Aberdeen.

Despite scoring on his debut, Barrowman struggled to live up to his potential and found himself in and out of the Inverness team in his first season.

=== Ross County, Dunfermline & Dundee ===
On 1 February 2010, Barrowman re-signed for title challengers Ross County on an 18-month deal after securing a release from Inverness. He contributed an assist for the second goal as Ross County eliminated Celtic on their way to the 2010 Scottish Cup Final. Barrowman played the whole game as Ross County lost 3–0 to Dundee United. On 12 October 2010, he returned to first-team duty after two months out with a broken foot to score a late equaliser against Partick Thistle in the semi-final of the Scottish Challenge Cup; Ross County won the penalty shootout to qualify for the final. He then scored the opening goal in the final as Ross County won the trophy beating Queen of the South 2–0.

On 3 June 2011, he left Ross County to join SPL newcomers Dunfermline Athletic on a two-year contract. On 26 March 2013, Dunfermline applied to enter into administration Two days later the club announced that eight players had been made redundant with Barrowman amongst them.

On 31 March 2013, it was announced that Barrowman had signed a deal with Dundee until the end of the season, following his release from Dunfermline.

=== Livingston, Morton and return to Dunfermline ===
Barrowman signed for Livingston on 23 August 2013, in a deal lasting through to January 2014. He then extended his contract until the end of the season. He was released in May 2014.

After leaving Livingston, Barrowman signed for League One side Greenock Morton. He was released by mutual consent in January 2015. On 13 January 2015, the same day he left Morton, Barrowman signed for former club Dunfermline Athletic on a short term six-month deal. The switch was part of a swap deal which saw Ross Forbes go the other way and head to Morton. He made his second Dunfermline debut at the first opportunity, starting in a 2–2 draw against Airdrieonians on 17 January 2015.

=== Albion Rovers ===
In July 2015, Barrowman signed for Albion Rovers alongside former Raith Rovers midfielder Mark Ferry. His season with Rovers was hampered by injury, though he did make 25 appearances across all competitions, scoring 4 times for the Scottish League One side. At the end of the 2015–16 season, Barrowman confirmed his retirement from football. Towards the end of his playing career, Barrowman had started a degree course in business management.

=== Arthurlie ===
In the 2018–2019 season, Barrowman made a return to football with Junior club Arthurlie where he made a handful of appearance before going back into retirement due to injury.

== Post-playing career ==
After retiring at the end of the 2015–16 season, Barrowman became Scottish brand manager for sportswear firm Joma at the beginning of 2017. Barrowman was appointed sporting director of Kelty Hearts in 2021. He left to become chief executive of Raith Rovers in May 2023, left in 2025.

== Honours ==
Ross County

- Scottish Second Division: 2007–08
- Scottish Challenge Cup: 2010–11

Morton

- Scottish League One: 2014–15
