= Gary Greenhill =

Scottish footballer (born 1985)

Personal information
- Date of birth: 16 June 1985 (age 41)
- Place of birth: Kirkcaldy, Scotland
- Position: Midfielder

Team information
- Current team: Perth SC

Senior career*
Years	Team	Apps	(Gls)
2003–2005	Dunfermline Athletic	1	(0)
2005–2007	Berwick Rangers	64	(2)
2007–2008	East Fife	22	(0)
2008	Berwick Rangers		
2009–	Perth SC		
2014	Kelty Hearts		
- * Club domestic league appearances and goals as of 21:36, 16 November 2007 (UTC)

Gary Greenhill (born 16 June 1985) is a Scottish professional footballer who played as a midfielder for Dundonald Bluebell Juniors.

== Career ==
Greenhill was born in Kirkcaldy, Fife. He started his career with Dunfermline Athletic and only made a single league appearance on 17 April 2004 where he came off the bench to face Dundee United in a game that ended 1–1.

In January 2005 Greenhill signed on loan to Berwick Rangers which eventually turned into a permanent contract. He made his debut on 15 January coming on in the 77th minute in a home game against Dumbarton which was a 3–0 loss. Greenhill scored his first goal for the club on 30 December 2006 in a 3–2 win away at Stenhousemuir. Greenhill helped Berwick win the Scottish 3rd Division title in the 2006–07 season. The club were crowned champions after the Berwick Arbroath game on 21 April 2007 which was the penultimate game of the season where they won 1–0. Greenhill had his contract renewed.

In August 2007 Greenhill moved to East Fife for an undisclosed fee. He went straight into the squad for his home debut against Stranraer which Fife won 3–1.

On 2 November 2008, Greenhill was sent off in 5–2 loss away at Dumbarton after pushing over the referee. The following day he was charged with assault. However the trial in December saw the case thrown out. The Daily Record reported that "Greenhill was initially suspended for three matches, before being hit with an additional two-match ban at a disciplinary hearing."

He then went on to help win the Western Australian League with Perth SC and later came back to Scotland to play for Dundonald Bluebell Juniors in Fife.

While playing for Kirkcaldy YM FC, in 2014 Greenhill was fined £800 for tweeting "you're dead, referee" and given a 16-match ban.

He is a partner in Super Lean, a meal prep business in Fife.

== Honours ==
Berwick Rangers

- Scottish League Division Three: 2006–07
