= Paul McQuade =

Scottish footballer

Personal information
- Date of birth: 17 May 1987 (age 39)
- Place of birth: Kirkcaldy, Scotland
- Position: Striker

Youth career
- Dunfermline Athletic

Senior career*
Years	Team	Apps	(Gls)
2004–2005	Raith Rovers	0	(0)
2005-2007	Linlithgow Rose		
2007–2008	Dundonald Bluebell	18	(16)
2008–2010	Cowdenbeath	68	(24)
2010–2011	St Mirren	6	(0)
2011	→ Forfar Athletic (loan)	5	(1)
2011–2012	East Fife	16	(0)
2012–2013	St Andrews United		
2013–2014	Dundonald Bluebell		
2014–2015	Broxburn Athletic		
- * Club domestic league appearances and goals

Paul McQuade (born 17 May 1987) is a Scottish former footballer who plays as a striker.

== Career ==
=== Raith Rovers ===
McQuade started his professional career at Raith Rovers but never made a reserve team appearance. He was released at the end of the 2004/05 season and had a spell playing Junior football with Dundonald Bluebell.

=== Cowdenbeath ===
McQuade was signed by Cowdenbeath after scoring a double against them and impressing in a friendly while playing for Dundonald Bluebell. During his time with the Blue Brazil he scored 29 goals in 85 appearances across all competitions.

=== St Mirren ===
In June 2010 McQuade joined St Mirren on a two-year contract, joining up with former manager Danny Lennon.

=== Forfar Athletic ===
In March 2011, McQuade joined Forfar Athletic on an emergency loan transfer until the end of the season.

=== East Fife ===
In August 2011, McQuade was freed by St Mirren and joined East Fife for a season. During his spell with the Fifers he made only 16 Appearances.
