= Dominic Keane =

Scottish banker & businessman

- Occupations: Businessman; Banker

Dominic Keane is a Scottish banker and businessman who was the previous owner of professional football club Livingston.

== Career ==
Keane worked as a manager for Royal Bank of Scotland. He later ran the holiday company Strathmore Travel, which traded as Dr Holiday.

In 1994, Keane was appointed to the board of directors of Celtic alongside new Chief executive officer Fergus McCann.

He became director and chairman of Livingston in 1998, saving the club from bankruptcy and providing investment which saw the West Lothian side promoted to the Scottish Premier League within three years. The club's rise was short-lived as they were placed into administration on 3 February 2004.

In August 2009, Keane was accused of defrauding lottery winner John McGuinness of £3m after a partnership to fund a new stand at Livingston FC went wrong. He was later cleared of all charges. However, he revealed during the trial that the financial crisis at Livingston had cost him his home and left him bankrupt.
