= Scott Gates (footballer) =

German-born football midfielder (born 1988)

Personal information
- Date of birth: 14 April 1988 (age 38)
- Place of birth: Wegberg, Germany
- Position: Midfielder

Youth career
- Tayport Thistle

Senior career*
Years	Team	Apps	(Gls)
2006–2008	Dundee	13	(0)
2007	→ Forfar Athletic (loan)	1	(0)
2007	→ Montrose (loan)	15	(2)
2008–2009	Arbroath	26	(2)
2009–2012	Carnoustie Panmure		(30+)
2012–2015	Lochee United F.C.		
2015–2016	Kelty Hearts FC	30+	(3)

International career
2006	Scotland U-17	?	(?)
- * Club domestic league appearances and goals

Scott Gates (born 14 April 1988) is a German-born football midfielder. The left winger rose through the Dundee ranks from the under-12 team to the full squad.

Gates was a former pupil of Madras College in St Andrews and played for Fife side Tayport Thistle, until joining Dundee FC Youth Development Squad aged 13. He made his first-team debut on 1 October 2005 against Brechin City in a Scottish Division 1 fixture whilst still only 17. He has continued to feature in the first team and has been capped at under-17 level for Scotland.

He joined Montrose on loan in July 2007, then Cowdenbeath in February 2008. He joined Arbroath on a one-year contract in May 2008 after being freed by Dundee.

On 3 March 2009, Gates, who was recently released by Arbroath, signed for junior side Carnoustie Panmure. Gates, who started his career at Dundee, had a loan spell at Highland League Champions Cove Rangers earlier this season. After 3 seasons, the fans favourite moved to local rivals Lochee United in 2012. Gates spent a further 3 seasons at the Bluebells before joining the East Junior Champions Kelty Hearts FC.
