= Gordon McDougall (businessman) =

Scottish businessman (born 1945)

- Born: 1945 (age 79–80); Scotland
- Citizenship: Scottish
- Occupation: Businessman
- Known for: Former chairperson of professional football club Livingston

Gordon McDougall is a Scottish businessman who was previously chairperson of professional football club Livingston.

== Career in football ==
McDougall bought over Scottish side Cowdenbeath in 1989. He sold the club in 2007.

In July 2009, McDougall resigned from his position on the board of Dunfermline in order to buy Livingston, who were facing a financial crisis under the ownership of Italian lawyer Angelo Massone. While Livingston seemed doomed, a meeting with the Scottish Football League on 30 July 2009 secured their future, as an agreement was reached to allow McDougall, Andy Gemmell, Ged Nixon and Neil Rankine (part of the Livingston 5 Consortium) to run the club for the following season. The next day, Massone sold his shares to the Livingston 5 Constortium and left the club. In an interview with the Scotsman in July 2012, Gordon McDougall, Massone's successor as Livingston chairman, branded the Italian 'a thief' and believed he should be banned for life from being involved in Scottish football.

McDougall was removed as chairman in July 2015 after initiating legal proceedings against Livngston over a £13k debt owed to him. Robert Wilson was appointed as his successor. He ultimately won the legal case to arrest the funds due to him by the club.
