= Mark Ferry =

Scottish footballer

Personal information
- Date of birth: 19 January 1984 (age 42)
- Place of birth: Glasgow, Scotland
- Height: 1.80 m (5 ft 11 in)
- Position: Midfielder

Senior career*
Years	Team	Apps	(Gls)
2001–2004	St Johnstone	13	(0)
2004	Forfar Athletic	14	(4)
2004–2008	Queen's Park	140	(39)
2008–2011	Raith Rovers	84	(10)
2012–2014	Stirling Albion	74	(22)
2015–2017	Albion Rovers	56	(2)
2017–2019	Stenhousemuir	64	(1)
2019–2020	Kilbirnie Ladeside		
- * Club domestic league appearances and goals

Mark Ferry (born 19 January 1984) is a Scottish former professional footballer.

== Career ==
Ferry started his career with St Johnstone and has also played for Forfar Athletic, Queen's Park, Raith Rovers and Stirling Albion. In July 2015, Ferry signed for with Albion Rovers. He scored his first Rovers goal, a long-range drive, in the club's 2–0 derby win against Airdrie on 24 September 2016. In June 2017, Ferry signed for Scottish League Two club Stenhousemuir.

== Career statistics ==
As of match played 28 October 2017

Appearances and goals by club, season and competition
Club	Season	League			Scottish Cup		League Cup		Other		Total	
Club	Season	Division	Apps	Goals	Apps	Goals	Apps	Goals	Apps	Goals	Apps	Goals
St Johnstone	2000–01	Premier League	1	0	0	0	0	0	—		1	0
St Johnstone	2001–02	Premier League	2	0	0	0	0	0	—		2	0
St Johnstone	2002–03	First Division	9	0	1	0	1	0	1 (Note: Appearances in the Scottish League Cup)	0	12	0
St Johnstone	2003–04	First Division	1	0	0	0	0	0	0	0	1	0
St Johnstone	St Johnstone total		13	0	1	0	1	0	1	0	16	0
Forfar Athletic	2003–04	Second Division	14	4	0	0	0	0	0	0	14	4
Queen's Park	2004–05	Third Division	18	3	0	0	0	0	0	0	18	7
Queen's Park	2005–06	Third Division	34	8	2	0	2	1	1	0	39	9
Queen's Park	2006–07	Third Division	35	11	2	1	2	0	5 (Note: Two appearances in the Scottish Challenge Cup and three in the Second Division play-offs)	0	44	12
Queen's Park	2007–08	Second Division	34	9	2	2	2	0	2	0	40	11
Queen's Park	Queen's Park total		121	31	6	3	6	1	8	0	141	39
Raith Rovers	2008–09	Second Division	35	5	2	0	2	0	1	0	40	5
Raith Rovers	2009–10	First Division	27	1	5	0	0	0	0	0	32	1
Raith Rovers	2010–11	First Division	22	2	0	0	2	1	0	0	24	4
Raith Rovers	Raith Rovers total		84	8	7	0	4	1	1	0	96	9
Stirling Albion (loan)	2011–12	Second Division	21	6	0	0	0	0	0	0	21	6
Stirling Albion	2012–13	Third Division	36	10	0	0	0	0	2	1	38	11
Stirling Albion	2013–14	League Two	27	4	3	1	1	0	4 (Note: One appearance in the Scottish Challenge Cup and three in the League One play-offs)	0	35	5
Stirling Albion	2014–15	League One	0	0	0	0	0	0	0	0	0	0
Stirling Albion	Stirling Albion total		63	14	3	1	1	0	6	1	73	16
Albion Rovers	2015–16	League One	25	0	0	0	1	0	1	0	27	0
Albion Rovers	2016–17	League One	31	1	1	0	4	0	2	1	38	2
Albion Rovers	Albion Rovers total		56	1	1	0	5	0	3	1	65	2
Stenhousemuir	2016–17	League Two	10	0	1	0	3	0	0	0	14	0
Career total			382	64	19	4	20	2	19	2	440	72
