= Marek Tomana =

Slovak footballer

Personal information
- Full name: Marek Tomana
- Date of birth: 23 September 1979 (age 47)
- Place of birth: Czechoslovakia
- Position: Midfielder

Senior career*
Years	Team	Apps	(Gls)
2006	Tatran Prešov		
2006–2008	Stirling Albion	45	(5)
2008	→ Cowdenbeath (loan)	6	(0)
2008–2009	Cowdenbeath	28	(1)
2009–2010	Montrose	20	(1)
- * Club domestic league appearances and goals

Marek Tomana (born 23 September 1979, in Czechoslovakia) is a former professional footballer.

Marek Tomana played for Tatran Prešov before signing for Stirling Albion in 2006. Tomana made his debut for Stirling Albion against Ayr United on 5 August 2006. Tomana was named Stirling Albion player of the year for the 2006–07 season.

Tomana joined Cowdenbeath on loan in March 2008, before leaving Stirling Albion and signing for Cowdenbeath permanently in July 2008. In September 2009 he joined Montrose of the fourth-tier Scottish Football League Third Division.
