= 2007–08 Scottish Second Division =

Scottish Second Division
- Season: 2007–08
- Champions: Ross County
- Promoted: Ross County; Airdrie United
- Relegated: Cowdenbeath; Berwick Rangers
- Top goalscorer: Andrew Barrowman (24)

The 2007–08 Second Division season was the fourteenth season of the Second Division in a ten team format.

The following teams competed: Airdrie United, Alloa Athletic, Ayr United, Berwick Rangers, Brechin City, Cowdenbeath, Peterhead, Queen's Park, Raith Rovers and Ross County.

The team which finished first were automatically promoted to the First Division, the teams which finished second, third and fourth were entered into the First division play-offs with the team which finished second bottom of the First Division for a place in the 2008–09 First Division.

The team which finished bottom were automatically relegated to the Third Division and the team which finished second bottom were entered into the Second division play-offs with the teams which finished second, third and fourth in the Third Division for a place in the 2008–09 Second Division.

== Promotion and relegation from 2006–07 ==
Location of teams in Scottish Second Division 2006–07

=== First and second divisions ===
Relegated from First Division to Second Division

- Ross County
- Airdrie United (via play-offs)

Promoted from Second Division to First Division

- Greenock Morton
- Stirling Albion (via play-offs)

=== Second and third divisions ===
Relegated from Second Division to Third Division

- Stranraer
- Forfar Athletic (via play-offs)

Promoted from Third Division to Second Division

- Berwick Rangers
- Queens Park (via play-offs)

== Events ==
- 15 March: East Fife confirm their promotion to the Second Division as Third Division champions with a 3–0 victory over East Stirlingshire.
- 29 March: Berwick Rangers are relegated from the Second Division after a 2–2 draw with Peterhead.
- 5 April: Ross County win promotion to the First Division as Champions after a 4–0 win over already-relegated Berwick Rangers and second place Airdrie United lose 2–1 to Brechin City.
- 8 April: Stirling Albion are relegated from the First Division to the Second Division after a 1–0 defeat to Partick Thistle.
- 10 May: Arbroath are promoted to the Second Division after a 2–1 aggregate win over Stranraer in the Second Division play-off final. Cowdenbeath, who were beaten by Arbroath in the semi-finals, are relegated to the Third Division.
- 10 May: Clyde retain their First Division status after defeating Airdrie United 3–0 on aggregate in the First Division play-off final.
- 29 May: First Division play-off runners-up Airdrie United are promoted to the First Division and Second Division play-off runners-up Stranraer are promoted to the Second Division following Gretna's demotion to the Third Division.

== Table ==
Pos	Team	Pld	W	D	L	GF	GA	GD	Pts	Promotion, qualification or relegation
1	Ross County (C, P)	36	22	7	7	78	44	+34	73	Promotion to the First Division
2	Airdrie United (P)	36	20	6	10	64	34	+30	66	Qualification for the First Division Play-offs (Note: The 2nd, 3rd and 4th placed teams will be entered into a play-off with the First Division's 9th placed team. The winning team were awarded a place in the 2008–09 First Division, Clyde won the play-off to stay in the division. However, with Gretna being relegated to the Third Division, Airdrie were promoted to Division One. Airdrie United won promotion to the First Division after Gretna were relegated to the Third Division.)
3	Raith Rovers	36	19	3	14	60	50	+10	60	Qualification for the First Division Play-offs
4	Alloa Athletic	36	16	8	12	57	56	+1	56	Qualification for the First Division Play-offs
5	Peterhead	36	16	7	13	65	54	+11	55	
6	Brechin City	36	13	13	10	63	48	+15	52	
7	Ayr United	36	13	7	16	51	62	−11	46	
8	Queen's Park	36	13	5	18	48	51	−3	44	
9	Cowdenbeath (R)	36	10	7	19	47	73	−26	37	Qualification for the Second Division Play-offs (Note: The 9th placed team were entered into a play-off with the Third Division's 2nd, 3rd and 4th placed teams. The winning team were awarded a place in the 2008–09 Second Division, Cowdenbeath were relegated and Arbroath were promoted. Due to Gretna's relegation, Stranraer were also promoted.)
10	Berwick Rangers (R)	36	3	7	26	40	101	−61	16	Relegation to the Third Division

Source: SPFL Archive
Rules for classification: 1) points; 2) goal difference; 3) number of goals scored.
(C) Champions; (P) Promoted; (R) Relegated

== Results ==
Teams play each other four times in this league. In the first half of the season each team plays every other team twice (home and away) and then do the same in the second half of the season.

=== First half of season ===
Home \ Away	AIR	ALO	AYR	BER	BRE	COW	PET	QPA	RAI	ROS
Airdrie United		2–0	0–0	4–0	2–1	3–1	1–1	1–0	0–1	0–1
Alloa Athletic	0–6		2–1	2–1	0–4	3–2	2–0	2–0	2–1	3–1
Ayr United	1–1	2–0		4–0	2–1	1–4	1–2	2–3	0–3	1–4
Berwick Rangers	2–0	0–3	1–1		3–3	1–1	1–2	1–1	2–1	0–4
Brechin City	4–2	0–0	2–2	2–2		1–1	2–2	2–1	0–1	1–2
Cowdenbeath	1–1	1–4	1–1	3–1	1–0		0–2	2–4	1–0	2–2
Peterhead	0–1	1–4	3–0	4–3	1–2	4–2		1–0	0–1	1–2
Queen's Park	0–1	1–0	1–1	1–0	3–0	0–1	1–1		2–5	3–2
Raith Rovers	2–1	2–1	2–3	3–1	1–1	2–0	2–2	0–2		0–2
Ross County	1–1	2–2	2–0	2–1	2–1	4–1	1–0	1–1	2–3	

Source: BBC Sport
Legend: Blue = home team win; Yellow = draw; Red = away team win.

=== Second half of season ===
Home \ Away	AIR	ALO	AYR	BER	BRE	COW	PET	QPA	RAI	ROS
Airdrie United		1–1	0–2	3–0	1–2	4–0	2–0	3–2	3–0	2–0
Alloa Athletic	1–2		1–2	2–1	2–2	3–2	2–0	1–2	2–0	2–0
Ayr United	1–2	3–1		4–0	0–3	1–1	0–3	3–1	0–1	0–2
Berwick Rangers	2–4	1–2	0–1		2–2	4–5	2–2	1–4	2–5	0–4
Brechin City	2–1	0–0	5–1	5–0		0–1	3–1	0–1	3–2	3–3
Cowdenbeath	0–1	1–1	2–0	1–2	0–2		0–4	1–0	1–4	2–4
Peterhead	1–4	2–2	4–1	9–2	2–0	1–0		1–0	1–0	1–1
Queen's Park	0–2	1–1	1–3	3–1	2–3	2–3	2–0		0–1	0–1
Raith Rovers	1–0	3–2	1–2	3–0	1–1	3–2	2–5	0–1		0–1
Ross County	3–2	6–1	2–4	4–0	0–0	3–0	5–1	3–2	2–3	

Source: BBC Sport
Legend: Blue = home team win; Yellow = draw; Red = away team win.

== Top scorers ==
Scorer	Goals	Team
(Scotland) Andrew Barrowman	24	Ross County
(Scotland) Allan Russell	19	Airdrie United
(Scotland) Alex Williams	16	Ayr United
(Scotland) Martin Bavidge	15	Peterhead
(Scotland) Ryan Stevenson	15	Ayr United
(Scotland) Stuart Noble	14	Airdrie United
(Scotland) Iain Diack	13	Brechin City
(Scotland) Alan Trouten	12	Queen's Park
(Scotland) Robert Mann	12	Peterhead
(Scotland) Graham Weir	10	Raith Rovers
(Scotland) Charlie King	10	Brechin City
(South Africa) Graeme Brown	10	Alloa Athletic
(Scotland) Sean Higgins	10	Ross County
(Scotland) Mark Ferry	9	Queen's Park
(Scotland) Brown Ferguson	9	Alloa Athletic
(Scotland) David Goodwillie	9	Raith Rovers

Source: The League Insider

== Attendances ==
Team	Stadium	Capacity	Highest	Lowest	Average
Ross County	Victoria Park	6,700	3,716	1,511	2,247
Raith Rovers	Stark's Park	10,104	2,357	1,349	1,759
Ayr United	Somerset Park	11,998	1,345	971	1,137
Airdrie United	New Broomfield	10,171	1,645	611	981
Queen's Park	Hampden Park	52,500	1,211	431	712
Peterhead	Balmoor	4,000	926	462	694
Alloa Athletic	Recreation Park	3,100	1,053	441	602
Cowdenbeath	Central Park	4,370	1,953	244	519
Brechin City	Glebe Park	3,960	669	345	489
Berwick Rangers	Shielfield Park	4,131	778	259	479

Source: The League Insider

== Managerial changes ==
Team	Outgoing manager	Manner of departure	Date of vacancy	Replaced by	Date of appointment
Ross County	(Scotland) Dick Campbell	Mutual consent	2 October	(Scotland) Derek Adams	21 November
Berwick Rangers	(Scotland) John Coughlin	Resigned	7 October	(Scotland) Michael Renwick	24 October
Queen's Park	(Scotland) Billy Stark	Resigned	9 January	(Scotland) Gardner Speirs	25 January
Greenock Morton	(Scotland) Jim McInally	Resigned	12 February	(Scotland) David Irons	19 February

== Monthly awards ==
Month	Second Division manager	SFL Player	SFL Young player
August	(Scotland) Billy Stark (Queen's Park)	First Division player	First Division player
September	(Scotland) Steve Paterson (Peterhead)	(Scotland) Ryan Stevenson (Ayr United)	First Division player
October	(Scotland) Alan Maitland (Alloa Athletic)	First Division player	First Division player
November	(Scotland) Derek Adams (Ross County)	First Division player	Third Division player
December	(Scotland) Michael O'Neill (Brechin City)	(Scotland) Allan Russell (Airdrie United)	First Division player
January	(Scotland) Derek Adams (Ross County)	(Scotland) Andrew Barrowman (Ross County)	First Division player
February	(Scotland) Neale Cooper (Peterhead)	First Division player	First Division player
March	(Scotland) Brian Reid (Ayr United)	First Division player	First Division player
April	(Scotland) Alan Maitland (Alloa Athletic)	First Division player	First Division player

== Second Division play-offs ==
=== Semi-finals ===
The ninth placed team in the Second Division played the fourth placed team in the Third Division and third placed team in the Second Division played the second placed team in the Second Division. The play-offs were played over two legs, the winning team in each semi-final advanced to the final.

Team 1	Agg.	Team 2	1st leg	2nd leg
Arbroath	3–2	Cowdenbeath	1–1	2–1
Montrose	1–4	Stranraer	1–1	0–3

First legs

30 April 2008
19:45

Arbroath	1–1	Cowdenbeath
Watson 58'	Report	Scullion 75' (pen.)

Gayfield Park, Arbroath
Attendance: 638
Referee: C Murray

30 April 2008
19:45

Montrose	1–1	Stranraer
Wood 27'	Report	McConalogue 54'

Links Park, Montrose
Attendance: 706
Referee: A Freeland

Second legs

3 May 2008
15:00

Cowdenbeath	1 – 2 (a.e.t.)	Arbroath
McQuade 71'	Report	Black 83'; Raeside 115'

Central Park, Cowdenbeath
Attendance: 778
Referee: W Collum

3 May 2008
15:00

Stranraer	3–0	Montrose
Tadé 68'; Mullen 79'; Gibson 88' (pen.)	Report

Stair Park, Stranraer
Attendance: 451
Referee: C Richmond

=== Final ===
The two semi-final winners played each other over two legs, the home team in the 1st Leg was determined by a draw conducted on 1 April 2008. the winning team was awarded a place in the 2008–09 Second Division.

Team 1	Agg.	Team 2	1st leg	2nd leg
Arbroath	2–1	Stranraer	2–0	0–1

First leg

7 May 2008
19:45

Arbroath	2–0	Stranraer
Raeside 43'; Sellars 60'	Report

Gayfield Park, Arbroath
Attendance: 1,016
Referee: E Smith

Second leg

10 May 2008
15:00

Stranraer	1–0	Arbroath
Tade 63'	Report

Stair Park, Stranraer
Attendance: 836
Referee: S Conroy
