= Graeme Brown (footballer) =

Scottish footballer

Personal information
- Full name: Graeme Brown
- Date of birth: 8 November 1980 (age 45)
- Place of birth: Johannesburg, South Africa
- Position: Forward

Senior career*
Years	Team	Apps	(Gls)
1997–2004	Cowdenbeath	213	(56)
2004–2005	Ayr United	26	(9)
2005–2009	Alloa Athletic	54	(14)
2009	Cowdenbeath	17	(1)
- * Club domestic league appearances and goals as of 09:49, 4 July 2009 (UTC)

Graeme Brown (born 8 November 1980 in Johannesburg, South Africa) is a South African-born Scottish football striker.

== Playing career ==
Brown began his career at Cowdenbeath as a 16-year-old in 1997. He scored 60 goals in six and a half years at Central Park, earning a move to Ayr United in January 2004. His appearances for the club were restricted by a broken foot and he moved to Alloa Athletic in March 2005.

He was released from Alloa to his former club Cowdenbeath in the January 2009 transfer window.

After struggling to find goals in Cowdenbeath's run in to the 2008/09 season, Brown was released by mutual consent. He has now retired from professional football and works as a solicitor in Glasgow.
