= 2012–13 Cowdenbeath F.C. season =

Cowdenbeath
2012–13 season
- Chairman: Donald Findlay
- Manager: Colin Cameron
- Stadium: Central Park
- First Division: 8th
- Challenge Cup: Semi-final (eliminated by Partick Thistle)
- League Cup: First round (eliminated by Montrose)
- Scottish Cup: Fourth round (eliminated by St Johnstone)
- Top goalscorer: League: Jamie Stevenson (8); All: Jamie Stevenson (11)
- Highest home attendance: 2,507 v Dunfermline Athletic, 11 August 2012
- Lowest home attendance: 370 v Hamilton Academical, 9 March 2013
- Average home league attendance: League: 762

The 2012–13 season was Cowdenbeath's first season back in the Scottish First Division, having been promoted from the Scottish Second Division at the end of the 2011–12 season. Cowdenbeath also competed in the Challenge Cup, League Cup and the Scottish Cup.

== Summary ==
=== Season ===
Cowdenbeath finished ninth in the Scottish First Division. They reached the Semi-final of the Challenge Cup, the first round of the League Cup and the fourth round of the Scottish Cup.

== Results and fixtures ==
Win Draw Loss Postponed

=== Preseason ===
6 July 2012 Friendly	Elgin City	3 – 3	Cowdenbeath	Borough Briggs
19:45	Miller 19'; Gunn 32'; Wyness 35'	Report	Linton 38'; O'Brien 62'; Brett 75'	Attendance: 293; Referee: Ross

7 July 2012 Friendly	Brora Rangers	2 – 4	Cowdenbeath	Dudgeon Park
15:00	Baxter 68'; Mackay 84'	Report	Milne 11'; McDonald 15'; Cameron 40'; Armstrong 90+'	Attendance: 90; Referee: Fraser

10 July 2012 Friendly (Closed Door)	Berwick Rangers	1 – 3	Cowdenbeath	Netherdale
	Bryson 75'	Report	Stevenson 14', 41', 46'

17 July 2012 Friendly	Selkirk	2 – 3	Cowdenbeath	Yarrow Park
19:30	Gibson 53', 54'	Report	Coult 58', 75'; Stevenson 88'	Referee: Hogg

14 July 2012 Friendly	Cowdenbeath	1 – 1	Aberdeen	Central Park
15:00	McKenzie 15'	Report	Brown 42'	Referee: Hilland

21 July 2012 Friendly	Cowdenbeath	1 – 1	St Johnstone	Central Park
15:00	McKenzie 42'	Report	Hasselbaink 86'

=== Scottish First Division ===
11 August 2012 Scottish First Division	Cowdenbeath	0 – 4	Dunfermline Athletic	Central Park
15:00		SFL Report	Barrowman 44'; Thomson 49', 79'; Falkingham 83'	Attendance: 2,507; Referee: McKendrick

18 August 2012 Scottish First Division	Dumbarton	0 – 3	Cowdenbeath	Dumbarton Football Stadium
15:00		SFL Report	Coult 9'; Stewart 17'; McKenzie 82' (Penalty)	Attendance: 695; Referee: Muir

25 August 2012 Scottish First Division	Cowdenbeath	1 – 0	Hamilton Academical	Central Park
15:00	Miller 12'	SFL Report		Attendance: 525; Referee: Murray

1 September 2012 Scottish First Division	Airdrie United	0 – 3	Cowdenbeath	Excelsior Stadium
15:00	Warren (red card) 65'	SFL Report	Miller 5'; Coult 76'; McKenzie 85'	Attendance: 816; Referee: Salmond

15 September 2012 Scottish First Division	Cowdenbeath	3 – 4	Greenock Morton	Central Park
15:00	Armstrong 40'; Ramsay 82'; Stevenson 90'	SFL Report	Weatherson 12', 25'; Campbell 45'; O'Brien 54'	Attendance: 611; Referee: Finnie

22 September 2012 Scottish First Division	Partick Thistle	2 – 1	Cowdenbeath	Firhill Stadium
15:00	Muirhead 25' (Penalty); Linton 70' (Own goal)	SFL Report	Stevenson 49'	Attendance: 2,510; Referee: Collum

29 September 2012 Scottish First Division	Cowdenbeath	1 – 1	Falkirk	Central Park
15:00	Coult 18'	SFL Report	Weatherston 3'	Attendance: 699; Referee: O'Reilly

6 October 2012 Scottish First Division	Livingston	1 – 1	Cowdenbeath	Braidwood Motor Company Stadium
15:00	Ke. Jacobs 71'	SFL Report	Armstrong (red card) 55'; Milne 90'	Attendance: 1,203; Referee: Allan

20 October 2012 Scottish First Division	Cowdenbeath	4 – 4	Raith Rovers	Central Park
15:00	Miller 6'; Stevenson 24'; Coult 78', 80'	SFL Report	Graham 35'; Spence 45'; Clarke 81'; Mensing 90'	Attendance: 1,209; Referee: Madden

27 October 2012 Scottish First Division	Dunfermline Athletic	3 – 0	Cowdenbeath	East End Park
15:00	Cardle 28'; Armstrong 77' (o.g.); Dargo 84'	SFL Report		Attendance: 3,353; Referee: Clancy

10 November 2012 Scottish First Division	Cowdenbeath	0 – 1	Dumbarton	Central Park
15:00		SFL Report	Gilhaney 29'	Attendance: 415; Referee: Tumilty

17 November 2012 Scottish First Division	Cowdenbeath	1 – 1	Airdrie United	Central Park
15:00	Stewart 70'	SFL Report	Buchanan 77'	Attendance: 423; Referee: Somers

24 November 2012 Scottish First Division	Greenock Morton	1 – 0	Cowdenbeath	Cappielow Park
15:00	Hawke 88'	SFL Report		Attendance: 1,526; Referee: Thomson

8 December 2012 Scottish First Division	Cowdenbeath	P – P	Partick Thistle	Central Park
15:00		BBC Report

15 December 2012 Scottish First Division	Falkirk	2 – 0	Cowdenbeath	Falkirk Stadium
15:00	Murdoch 33' (Penalty); Taylor 42'	SFL Report		Attendance: 2,647; Referee: Robertson

22 December 2012 Scottish First Division	Cowdenbeath	1 – 1	Livingston	Central Park
15:00	McKenzie 1'	SFL Report	Scougall 70'	Attendance: 409; Referee: Collum

29 December 2012 Scottish First Division	Raith Rovers	2 – 2	Cowdenbeath	Stark's Park
15:00	Hill 50'; Spence 53'	SFL Report	Milne 9'; Stevenson 42' (pen.)	Attendance: 1,877; Referee: Murray

2 January 2013 Scottish First Division	Airdrie United	1 – 1	Cowdenbeath	Excelsior Stadium
15:00	Donnelly 68'	SFL Report	Brett 3'	Attendance: 776; Referee: Salmond

5 January 2013 Scottish First Division	Cowdenbeath	1 – 1	Greenock Morton	Central Park
15:00	Caddis 37'	SFL Report	MacDonald 51'	Attendance: 647; Referee: Tumilty

12 January 2013 Scottish First Division	Hamilton Academical	2 – 1	Cowdenbeath	New Douglas Park
15:00	Page 61'; May 65'; Neil (yellow card) 68' (yellow-red card)	SFL Report	Hemmings 24'	Attendance: 1,021; Referee: Brines

19 January 2013 Scottish First Division	Cowdenbeath	P – P	Dunfermline Athletic	Central Park
15:00		BBC Report
Note: Postponed due to frozen pitch

26 January 2013 Scottish First Division	Partick Thistle	2 – 1	Cowdenbeath	Firhill Stadium
15:00	Craig 25'; Balatoni 44'	SFL Report	Hemmings 9'	Attendance: 2,543; Referee: Allan

2 February 2013 Scottish First Division	Cowdenbeath	P – P	Partick Thistle	Central Park
15:00		BBC Report
Note: Postponed due to a waterlogged pitch

9 February 2013 Scottish First Division	Cowdenbeath	4 – 1	Falkirk	Central Park
15:00	Armstrong 35', 73'; Hemmings 38'; Stevenson 90+1'	SFL Report	Taylor 2'	Attendance: 566; Referee: Finnie

12 February 2013 Scottish First Division	Cowdenbeath	4 – 2	Dunfermline Athletic	Central Park
19:45	Milne 33'; Linton 75', 88'; Hemmings 81'	BBC Report	Dowie 70'; Kirk 71'	Attendance: 1,330; Referee: Somers

16 February 2013 Scottish First Division	Livingston	3 – 0	Cowdenbeath	Braidwood Motor Company Stadium
15:00	Russell 27'; Andreu 39'; Garcia Tena 44'	SFL Report		Attendance: 1,112; Referee: Muir

23 February 2013 Scottish First Division	Cowdenbeath	1 – 1	Raith Rovers	Central Park
15:00	Stewart 81'	Raith Report	Graham 48'	Attendance: 1,078; Referee: Colvin

26 February 2013 Scottish First Division	Cowdenbeath	A – A	Partick Thistle	Central Park
19:45	Moore 4', 64'	SFL Report	Lawless 23'	Attendance: 719; Referee: Charleston
Note: Abandoned due to fog

2 March 2013 Scottish First Division	Dumbarton	2 – 2	Cowdenbeath	Dumbarton Football Stadium
15:00	Prunty 66'; Agnew 84'	SFL Report	Stevenson 11'; Moore 90'	Attendance: 742; Referee: Tumilty

9 March 2013 Scottish First Division	Cowdenbeath	1 – 1	Hamilton Academical	Central Park
15:00	Moore 38'	SFL Report	May 32'	Attendance: 370; Referee: Salmond

16 March 2013 Scottish First Division	Cowdenbeath	3 – 2	Airdrie United	Central Park
15:00	McKenzie 13'; Stewart 68'; Moore 88'	SFL Report	Moore 12'; Kirkpatrick 82'	Attendance: 407; Referee: Norris

19 March 2013 Scottish First Division	Cowdenbeath	P – P	Partick Thistle	Central Park
19:45		BBC Report
Note: Postponed due to snow

23 March 2013 Scottish First Division	Greenock Morton	4 – 2	Cowdenbeath	Cappielow
15:00	MacDonald 51' (Penalty), 54'; Taggart 63'; Hardie 71'	SFL Report	Moore 13'; Stevenson 40'	Attendance: 1,533; Referee: Brines

27 March 2013 Scottish First Division	Cowdenbeath	0 – 3	Partick Thistle	Central Park
19:45	O'Brien (red card) 70'	SFL Report	O'Donnell 24'; Doolan 30', 79'	Attendance: 716; Referee: Charleston

30 March 2013 Scottish First Division	Cowdenbeath	1 – 2	Partick Thistle	Central Park
15:00	Moore 31'	SFL Report	Doolan 12', 62'	Attendance: 1,214; Referee: Muir

6 April 2013 Scottish First Division	Falkirk	4 – 0	Cowdenbeath	Falkirk Stadium
15:00	Dods 69'; Sibbald 78'; Higgins 87' (Penalty), 89'	SFL Report		Attendance: 2,539; Referee: Murray

9 April 2013 Scottish First Division	Cowdenbeath	2 – 2	Livingston	Central Park
19:45	Stewart 35'; McKenzie 90'	SFL Report	Watson 7'; Barr 71'	Attendance: 455; Referee: Allan

13 April 2013 Scottish First Division	Raith Rovers	0 – 1	Cowdenbeath	Stark's Park
15:00		SFL Report	Stevenson 41'	Attendance: 1,574; Referee: Collum

20 April 2013 Scottish First Division	Dunfermline Athletic	1 – 0	Cowdenbeath	East End Park
15:00	Husband 67' (Penalty)	SFL Report		Attendance: 4,879; Referee: Mclean

27 April 2013 Scottish First Division	Cowdenbeath	2 – 3	Dumbarton	Central Park
15:00	Moore 15'; Miller 88'	SFL Report	Agnew 35', 44' (Penalty); Lister 39'	Attendance: 659; Referee: Finnie

4 May 2013 Scottish First Division	Hamilton Academical	1 – 3	Cowdenbeath	New Douglas Park
15:00	Stevie May 27'; Ryan (red card) 31'	SFL Report	Linton 48'; Moore 72'; McKenzie 84'	Attendance: 1,434; Referee: Madden

=== Scottish Challenge Cup ===
28 July 2012 Scottish Challenge Cup round 1	Cowdenbeath	1 – 1 (a.e.t.) (3 – 1 p)	Alloa Athletic	Central Park
15:00	Coult 2'	SFL Report	Gordon 20'	Attendance: 323; Referee: Madden
	Penalties
	Coult (penalty missed); McKenzie (penalty scored); Ramsay (penalty scored); Stevenson (penalty scored)		McCord (penalty missed); Grehan (penalty missed); Holmes (penalty scored); Docherty (penalty missed)

14 August 2012 Scottish Challenge Cup round 2	Cowdenbeath	3 – 0	East Fife	Central Park
19:45	Stevenson 44', 73'; Miller 67'	SFL Report		Attendance: 466; Referee: Tumilty

9 September 2012 Scottish Challenge Cup QF	East Stirlingshire	1 – 2	Cowdenbeath	Ochilview Park
15:00	Kelly 24'	SFL Report	McKenzie 10'; Adamson 40'	Attendance: 414; Referee: Brines

14 October 2012 Scottish Challenge Cup SF	Cowdenbeath	0 – 1	Partick Thistle	Central Park
16:05		SFL Report	Craig 74'	Attendance: 1,159; Referee: McKendrick

=== Scottish League Cup ===
4 August 2012 Scottish League Cup round 1	Montrose	2 – 1	Cowdenbeath	Links Park
15:00	Boyle 31'; Watson 43'	SFL Report	McKenzie 90'	Attendance: 312; Referee: Roache

=== Scottish Cup ===
3 November 2012 Scottish Cup round 3	Cowdenbeath	8 – 1	Vale of Leithen	Central Park
14:00	Stewart 25', 31', 41'; Coult 47', 51'; McKenzie 49'; Ramsay 64'; Stevenson 78'	BBC Report	Moffat 2'	Attendance: 309; Referee: Salmond

1 December 2012 Scottish Cup round 4	Cowdenbeath	P – P	St Johnstone	Central Park
15:00		BBC Report

4 December 2012 Scottish Cup round 4	Cowdenbeath	P – P	St Johnstone	Central Park
19:45		BBC Report

10 December 2012 Scottish Cup round 4	Cowdenbeath	P – P	St Johnstone	Central Park
19:45		BBC Report

12 December 2012 Scottish Cup round 4	Cowdenbeath	P – P	St Johnstone	Central Park
19:45		BBC Report

17 December 2012 Scottish Cup round 4	Cowdenbeath	0 – 3	St Johnstone	Central Park
19:45		BBC Report	McCracken 54'; MacLean 76' (pen.); Tadé 87'	Attendance: 809; Referee: Beaton

== Player statistics ==
=== Captains ===
No.	P	Name	Country	No. games	Notes
	DF	Mbu	(Cameroon)	16	Club captain
	DF	Armstrong	(Scotland)	26	Vice-captain

Last updated: 7 May 2013
Source: Competitive match reports.
Competitive matches only
Matches started as captain only
Country: FIFA nationality; No.: Squad number; P: Position; Name: Player name; No. Games: Number of games started as captain.

=== Squad ===
Last updated 7 May 2013

No.	Pos	Nat	Player	Total		First Division		Challenge Cup		League Cup		Scottish Cup	
No.	Pos	Nat	Player	Apps	Goals	Apps	Goals	Apps	Goals	Apps	Goals	Apps	Goals
	GK	(England) ENG	Thomas Flynn	36	0	30+0	0	4+0	0	1+0	0	1+0	0
	GK	(Scotland) SCO	Colin Stewart	5	0	5+0	0	0+0	0	0+0	0	0+0	0
	GK	(Scotland) SCO	Craig Wight	3	0	0+2	0	0+0	0	0+0	0	1+0	0
	GK	(Scotland) SCO	Lee Wilson	1	0	1+0	0	0+0	0	0+0	0	0+0	0
	DF	(Scotland) SCO	Kenny Adamson	38	1	32+0	0	4+0	1	0+0	0	2+0	0
	DF	(Scotland) SCO	John Armstrong	41	3	35+0	3	3+0	0	1+0	0	2+0	0
	DF	(Scotland) SCO	Steven Bennett	1	0	1+0	0	0+0	0	0+0	0	0+0	0
	DF	(Scotland) SCO	Dean Brett	19	0	15+1	0	2+0	0	0+0	0	1+0	0
	DF	(England) ENG	David Cowan	21	0	18+0	0	2+0	0	0+0	0	1+0	0
	DF	(Scotland) SCO	Scott Linton	30	3	22+3	3	3+1	0	1+0	0	0+0	0
	DF	(Cameroon) CMR	Joe Mbu	19	0	11+2	0	2+1	0	1+0	0	2+0	0
	DF	(Scotland) SCO	Jason Naismith	5	0	3+2	0	0+0	0	0+0	0	0+0	0
	DF	(Scotland) SCO	Thomas O'Brien	36	0	23+7	0	1+3	0	1+0	0	1+0	0
	MF	(Scotland) SCO	Dean Brett	14	1	8+4	1	0+0	0	1+0	0	1+0	0
	MF	(Scotland) SCO	Liam Caddis	3	1	3+0	1	0+0	0	0+0	0	0+0	0
	MF	(Scotland) SCO	Liam Callaghan	1	0	0+1	0	0+0	0	0+0	0	0+0	0
	MF	(Scotland) SCO	Colin Cameron	25	0	19+2	0	1+0	0	1+0	0	0+2	0
	MF	(Spain) ESP	Rubén García Rey	6	0	1+2	0	2+0	0	1+0	0	0+0	0
	MF	(England) ENG	Lee Makel	0	0	0+0	0	0+0	0	0+0	0	0+0	0
	MF	(England) ENG	Sean McAllister	9	0	9+0	0	0+0	0	0+0	0	0+0	0
	MF	(Scotland) SCO	Kyle Miller	33	5	16+11	4	3+0	1	0+1	0	1+1	0
	MF	(Scotland) SCO	Lewis Milne	24	3	12+7	3	3+0	0	0+1	0	1+0	0
	MF	(Spain) ESP	Albert Puigdollers	4	0	3+0	0	0+0	0	0+0	0	1+0	0
	MF	(Scotland) SCO	Mark Ramsay	24	2	10+10	1	2+1	0	0+0	0	1+0	1
	MF	(Scotland) SCO	Jon Robertson	4	0	4+0	0	0+0	0	0+0	0	0+0	0
	MF	(Scotland) SCO	Sam Stanton	2	0	2+0	0	0+0	0	0+0	0	0+0	0
	MF	(Scotland) SCO	Jamie Stevenson	41	11	32+3	8	4+0	2	1+0	0	1+0	1
	FW	(Scotland) SCO	Lewis Coult	35	8	19+10	5	2+1	1	1+0	0	2+0	2
	FW	(Scotland) SCO	Liam Cusack	0	0	0+0	0	0+0	0	0+0	0	0+0	0
	FW	(England) ENG	Kane Hemmings	7	4	7+0	4	0+0	0	0+0	0	0+0	0
	FW	(Scotland) SCO	Marc McKenzie	40	9	26+7	6	4+0	1	1+0	1	2+0	1
	FW	(Scotland) SCO	Craig Moore	12	7	11+1	7	0+0	0	0+0	0	0+0	0
	FW	(Spain) ESP	Pablo Navas	5	0	0+3	0	0+1	0	0+0	0	0+1	0
	FW	(Scotland) SCO	Jack Nicholson	1	0	0+0	0	0+1	0	0+0	0	0+0	0
	FW	(Scotland) SCO	Greg Stewart	29	8	17+8	5	2+1	0	0+0	0	1+0	3
	FW	(Saint Kitts and Nevis) SKN	Zephaniah Thomas	7	0	1+4	0	0+0	0	0+0	0	0+2	0

=== Disciplinary record ===
Includes all competitive matches.

Last updated 7 May 2013

Nation	Position	Name	First Division		Challenge Cup		League Cup		Scottish Cup		Total	
Nation	Position	Name	Booked	Sent off (straight red)	Booked	Sent off (straight red)	Booked	Sent off (straight red)	Booked	Sent off (straight red)	Booked	Sent off (straight red)
(England)	GK	Thomas Flynn	1	0	0	0	0	0	1	0	2	0
(Scotland)	GK	Colin Stewart	0	0	0	0	0	0	0	0	0	0
(Scotland)	GK	Craig Wight	0	0	0	0	0	0	0	0	0	0
(Scotland)	GK	Lee Wilson	0	0	0	0	0	0	0	0	0	0
(Scotland)	DF	Kenny Adamson	10	0	1	0	0	0	0	0	11	0
(Scotland)	DF	John Armstrong	1	1	1	0	0	0	0	0	2	1
(Scotland)	DF	Steven Bennett	0	0	0	0	0	0	0	0	0	0
(Scotland)	DF	Dean Brett	1	0	1	0	0	0	0	0	2	0
(England)	DF	David Cowan	2	0	0	0	0	0	0	0	2	0
(Scotland)	DF	Scott Linton	0	0	0	0	0	0	0	0	0	0
(Cameroon)	DF	Joe Mbu	1	0	0	0	0	0	0	0	1	0
(Scotland)	DF	Jason Naismith	0	0	0	0	0	0	0	0	0	0
(Scotland)	DF	Thomas O'Brien	5	1	0	0	0	0	0	0	5	1
(Scotland)	MF	Dean Brett	3	0	0	0	0	0	0	0	3	0
(Scotland)	MF	Liam Caddis	0	0	0	0	0	0	0	0	0	0
(Scotland)	MF	Liam Callaghan	0	0	0	0	0	0	0	0	0	0
(Scotland)	MF	Colin Cameron	4	0	0	0	0	0	1	0	5	0
(Spain)	MF	Rubén García Rey	0	0	0	0	1	0	0	0	1	0
(England)	MF	Lee Makel	0	0	0	0	0	0	0	0	0	0
(England)	MF	Sean McAllister	1	0	0	0	0	0	0	0	1	0
(Scotland)	MF	Kyle Miller	1	0	0	0	0	0	0	0	1	0
(Scotland)	MF	Lewis Milne	0	0	0	0	0	0	0	0	0	0
(Spain)	MF	Albert Puigdollers	0	0	0	0	0	0	0	0	0	0
(Scotland)	MF	Mark Ramsay	4	0	0	0	0	0	0	0	4	0
(Scotland)	MF	Jon Robertson	0	0	0	0	0	0	0	0	0	0
(Scotland)	MF	Sam Stanton	0	0	0	0	0	0	0	0	0	0
(Scotland)	MF	Jamie Stevenson	3	0	0	0	0	0	0	0	3	0
(Scotland)	FW	Lewis Coult	2	0	0	0	0	0	0	0	2	0
(Scotland)	FW	Liam Cusack	0	0	0	0	0	0	0	0	0	0
(England)	FW	Kane Hemmings	0	0	0	0	0	0	0	0	0	0
(Scotland)	FW	Marc McKenzie	2	0	0	0	0	0	0	0	2	0
(Scotland)	FW	Craig Moore	2	0	0	0	0	0	0	0	2	0
(Spain)	FW	Pablo Navas	0	0	0	0	0	0	0	0	0	0
(Scotland)	FW	Jack Nicholson	0	0	0	0	0	0	0	0	0	0
(Scotland)	FW	Greg Stewart	1	0	0	0	0	0	0	0	1	0
(Saint Kitts and Nevis)	FW	Zephaniah Thomas	0	0	0	0	0	0	0	0	0	0

== Team statistics ==
=== League table ===
Pos	Team	Pld	W	D	L	GF	GA	GD	Pts	Promotion or relegation
6	Raith Rovers	36	11	13	12	45	48	−3	46	
7	Dumbarton	36	13	4	19	58	83	−25	43	
8	Cowdenbeath	36	8	12	16	51	65	−14	36	
9	Dunfermline Athletic (R)	36	14	7	15	62	59	+3	34 (Note: Dunfermline Athletic were deducted 15 points for entering administration.)	Qualification for the First Division Play-offs
10	Airdrie United (R)	36	5	7	24	41	89	−48	22	Relegation to League One

Source: SPFL Archive
Rules for classification: 1) points; 2) goal difference; 3) number of goals scored.
(R) Relegated

=== Division summary ===
Round	1	2	3	4	5	6	7	8	9	10	11	12	13	14	15	16	17	18	19	20	21	22	23	24	25	26	27	28	29	30	31	32	33	34	35	36
Ground	H	A	H	A	H	A	H	A	H	A	H	H	A	A	H	A	A	H	A	A	H	H	A	H	A	H	H	A	H	H	A	H	A	A	H	A
Result	L	W	W	W	L	L	D	D	D	L	L	D	L	L	D	D	D	D	L	L	W	W	L	D	D	D	W	L	L	L	L	D	W	L	L	W
Position	10	5	5	3	4	5	5	5	5	6	6	6	7	7	7	8	8	8	8	9	9	7	8	8	9	8	7	8	9	9	9 (Note: Dunfermline were deducted 15 points shortly prior to this fixture altering league standings. This was as a result of them entering administration.)	8	7	9	9	8

Updated to match(es) played on 7 May 2013. Source:
A = Away; H = Home; W = Win; D = Draw; L = Loss

== Transfers ==
=== Players in ===
Player	From	Fee
(Scotland) Jamie Stevenson	(Scotland) Airdrie United	Free
(Spain) Rubén García Rey	(Spain) Torremolinos	Free
(Saint Kitts and Nevis) Zephaniah Thomas	(Belgium) Montegnée	Free
(Spain) Pablo Navas	(Spain) Marinaleda	Free
(Spain) Albert Puigdollers	(Spain) CE Sabadell	Free
(Scotland) Liam Caddis	(Scotland) St Johnstone	Loan
(England) Kane Hemmings	(Scotland) Rangers	Loan
(Scotland) Sam Stanton	(Scotland) Hibernian	Loan
(Scotland) Craig Moore	(Scotland) Motherwell	Loan
(Scotland) Jon Robertson	(Scotland) St Mirren	Loan
(Scotland) Jason Naismith	(Scotland) St Mirren	Loan

=== Players out ===
Player	To	Fee
(Scotland) Jon Robertson	(Scotland) St Mirren	Free
(Scotland) Youssef Bejaoui	(Scotland) Berwick Rangers	Free
(Scotland) Steven Bennett	Free agent	Free
(Scotland) Paul Byrne	Free agent	Free
(Scotland) Dene Droudge	(Scotland) Berwick Rangers	Free
(Scotland) Danny Mackay	Free agent	Free
(Scotland) Zane Powell	(Scotland) Glenrothes	Free
(Zimbabwe) Anesu Tabengwa	Free agent	Free
(Scotland) Derek Lyle	(Scotland) Queen of the South	Free
(Spain) Albert Puigdollers	(Spain) Recreativo de Huelva	Free
(Spain) Rubén García Rey	Free agent	Free
(Saint Kitts and Nevis) Zephaniah Thomas	Free agent	Free
(Cameroon) Joe Mbu	(Scotland) Stenhousemuir	Loan
(Spain) Pablo Navas	Free agent	Free
