= 2008–09 Cowdenbeath F.C. season =

Cowdenbeath
2008–09 season
- Manager: Danny Lennon
- Stadium: Central Park
- Scottish Third Division: Second (promoted)
- Challenge Cup: Quarter-final, lost to v Airdrie United
- League Cup: Second Round, lost to v Dundee United
- Scottish Cup: Second Round, lost to v Elgin City
- Top goalscorer: League: John Gemmell (12); All: John Gemmell (14)

During the 2008–09 season Cowdenbeath competed in the Scottish Third Division, Scottish Cup, Scottish League Cup and the Challenge Cup.

== Summary ==
Cowdenbeath finished second in the Third Division, entering the play-offs losing 5–4 on penalties to Stenhousemuir. Following Livingston's demotion after going into Administration, Cowdenbeath were promoted to the Second Division. They reached the second round of the Scottish Cup, the second round of the League Cup and were eliminated in the Quarter-finals of the Challenge Cup.

=== Management ===
For season 2008–09 Cowdenbeath were managed by Danny Lennon, following the sacking of Brian Welsh in the summer.

== Results & fixtures ==
Win Draw Loss

=== Scottish Third Division ===
2 August 2008 Third Division	Cowdenbeath	1–4	Annan Athletic	Central Park
	McQuade 16'	BBC Report	Jack 29' (Penalty), 48'; Archibald 58'; Johnstone 90'	Attendance: 596; Referee: Watters

9 August 2008 Third Division	Forfar Athletic	0–1	Cowdenbeath	Station Park
		ESPN Report	Ramsay 69'	Attendance: 412; Referee: Northcroft

16 August 2008 Third Division	Cowdenbeath	2–1	Albion Rovers	Central Park
	Fairburn 22'; Gemmell 81'	BBC Report	Walker 58'	Attendance: 302; Referee: Madden

22 August 2008 Third Division	Elgin City	0–2	Cowdenbeath	Borough Briggs
		BBC Report	McGregor 59'; Gemmell 60'	Attendance: 537; Referee: McDermott

30 August 2008 Third Division	Stenhousemuir	1–0	Cowdenbeath	Ochilview Park
	Motion 85'	ESPN Report		Attendance: 456; Referee: Robertson

13 September 2008 Third Division	Cowdenbeath	2–1	Berwick Rangers	Central Park
	Gemmell 2'; Fairbairn 9'	BBC Report	Ewart 60'	Attendance: 375; Referee: Colvin

20 September 2008 Third Division	Dumbarton	2–1	Cowdenbeath	Strathclyde Homes Stadium
	Carcary 36'; Gordon 90'	BBC Report	McQuade 90'	Attendance: 801; Referee: O'Reilly

27 September 2008 Third Division	Cowdenbeath	2–1	Montrose	Central Park
	Gemmell 32'; McQuade 71'	ESPN Report	Baird 44'	Attendance: 296; Referee: Salmond

4 October 2008 Third Division	Cowdenbeath	0–0	East Stirlingshire	Central Park
		BBC Report		Attendance: 431; Referee: Hilland

18 October 2008 Third Division	Annan Athletic	0–1	Cowdenbeath	Galabank
		BBC Report	McQuade 22'	Attendance: 578; Referee: Madden

1 November 2008 Third Division	Albion Rovers	3–1	Cowdenbeath	Cliftonhill
	Barr 16'; Benton 74'; Harris 90'	BBC Report	Armstrong 58'	Attendance: 259; Referee: Northcroft

8 November 2008 Third Division	Cowdenbeath	4–1	Elgin City	Central Park
	McQuade 8', 30'; Armstrong 10', 73'	BBC Report	Shallicker 7'	Attendance: 193; Referee: Watters

15 November 2008 Third Division	Cowdenbeath	1–2	Stenhousemuir	Central Park
	McQuade 81'	BBC Report	Thom 15'; Dalziel 26'	Attendance: 406; Referee: Madden

22 November 2008 Third Division	Berwick Rangers	2–3	Cowdenbeath	Shielfield Park
	Gribben 11', 59'	BBC Report	Armstrong 19'; Dempster 63'; McQuade 75'	Attendance: 389; Referee: McKendrick

13 December 2008 Third Division	Montrose	0–1	Cowdenbeath	Links Park
		BBC Report	Dempster 38'	Attendance: 334; Referee: MacDonald

20 December 2008 Third Division	East Stirlingshire	1–4	Cowdenbeath	Ochilview Park
		BBC Report	Fairbairn 9', 87'; Adamson 57'; McQuade 73'	Attendance: 457; Referee: Colvin

10 January 2009 Third Division	Cowdenbeath	2–0	Dumbarton	Central Park
	Adamson 13'; McQuade 80'	BBC Report		Attendance: 416; Referee: Salmond

13 January 2009 Third Division	Cowdenbeath	2–0	Berwick Rangers	Central Park
	Dempster 30'; Tomana 90'	BBC Report		Attendance: 282; Referee: Northcroft

17 January 2009 Third Division	Elgin City	1–1	Cowdenbeath	Borough Briggs
	Wright 75'	BBC Report	Brown 60'	Attendance: 382; Referee: Murray

24 January 2009 Third Division	Cowdenbeath	2–1	Albion Rovers	Central Park
	Gemmell 21', 38'	ESPN Report	Harty 41' (Penalty)	Attendance: 409; Referee: Charleston

31 January 2009 Third Division	Cowdenbeath	1–0	Annan Athletic	Central Park
	Gemmell 37'	ESPN Report		Attendance: 326; Referee: Robertson

21 February 2009 Third Division	Dumbarton	1–1	Cowdenbeath	Strathclyde Homes Stadium
	Boyle 34'	BBC Report	Dempster 57'	Attendance: 846; Referee: Norris

28 February 2009 Third Division	Cowdenbeath	1–0	Stenhousemuir	Central Park
	Dempster 86'	ESPN Report		Attendance: 459; Referee: McKendrick

3 March 2009 Third Division	Stenhousemuir	1–0	Cowdenbeath	Ochilview Park
	Diack 33'	BBC Report		Attendance: 423; Referee: McLean

7 March 2009 Third Division	Berwick Rangers	1–0	Cowdenbeath	Shielfield Park
	Bonar 51'	BBC Report		Attendance: 523; Referee: Colvin

10 March 2009 Third Division	Cowdenbeath	0–0	Forfar Athletic	Central Park
		ESPN Report		Attendance: 317; Referee: Hilland

14 March 2009 Third Division	Annan Athletic	3–1	Cowdenbeath	Galabank
	Sloan 12'; Dunbar 87'; Storey 90'	BBC Report	MacKay 21'	Attendance: 629; Referee: Muir

17 March 2009 Third Division	Cowdenbeath	2–1	Montrose	Central Park
	Gemmell 4', 18'	BBC Report	McKenzie 27'	Attendance: 303; Referee: McKay

21 March 2009 Third Division	Cowdenbeath	2–0	East Stirlingshire	Central Park
	Fairbairn 38'; Armstrong 76'	ESPN Report		Attendance: 298; Referee: Watters

31 March 2009 Third Division	Forfar Athletic	1–1	Cowdenbeath	Station Park
	Campbell 14'	ESPN Report	Gemmell 7'	Attendance: 621; Referee: Hilland

4 April 2009 Third Division	Cowdenbeath	1–1	Elgin City	Central Park
	Gemmell 84'	BBC Report	Shallicker 70' (Penalty)	Attendance: 331; Referee: Madden

11 April 2009 Third Division	Albion Rovers	0–0	Cowdenbeath	Cliftonhill
		ESPN Report		Attendance: 452; Referee: McDermott

18 April 2009 Third Division	Cowdenbeath	0–0	Dumbarton	Central Park
		ESPN Report		Attendance: 1,181; Referee: Finnie

25 April 2009 Third Division	Montrose	2–1	Cowdenbeath	Links Park
	Tweed 65'; Hegarty 72' (Penalty)	BBC Report	Gemmell 8'	Attendance: 403; Referee: McKendrick

2 May 2009 Third Division	Cowdenbeath	2–2	Forfar Athletic	Central Park
	Stein 33', 43'	BBC Report	Gordon 3'; Russell 4'	Attendance: 527; Referee: Northcroft

9 May 2009 Third Division	East Stirlingshire	0–2	Cowdenbeath	Ochilview Park
		BBC Report	Ferguson 78', 90'	Attendance: 434; Referee: Robertson

=== Second Division play-offs ===
13 May 2009 Play-offs SF R1	East Stirlingshire	1–2	Cowdenbeath	Ochilview Park
	Rodgers 62'	BBC Report	Gemmell 12'; Stein 30'	Attendance: 605; Referee: Collum

16 May 2009 Play-offs SF R2	Cowdenbeath	1–1	East Stirlingshire	Central Park
	Dempster 84'	BBC Report	Graham 3'	Attendance: 633; Referee: Tumilty

20 May 2009 Play-offs Final R1	Cowdenbeath	0–0	Stenhousemuir	Central Park
		Report		Attendance: 775; Referee: Muir

20 May 2009 Play-offs Final R2	Stenhousemuir	0–0 (5 – 4 pen.) (a.e.t.)	Cowdenbeath	Ochilview Park
		Report		Attendance: 1,530; Referee: O'Reilly

=== Challenge Cup ===
26 July 2008 Challenge Cup round 1	Elgin City	0–2	Cowdenbeath	Borough Briggs
		BBC Report	McGregor 13'; McQuade 80'	Attendance: 379; Referee: Salmond

12 August 2008 Challenge Cup round 2	Cowdenbeath	3–2	Albion Rovers	Central Park
	McQuade 8'; Gemmell 54'; Fairbairn 89'	BBC Report	Barr 30'; Martin 75'	Attendance: 204; Referee: Crawford

7 September 2008 Challenge Cup quarter-finals	Cowdenbeath	1–2	Airdrie United	Central Park
	Fairbairn 79'; Baxter (red card) 84'	BBC Report	Di Giacomo 53' 75'	Attendance: 643; Referee: Finnie

=== League Cup ===
5 August 2008 League Cup round 1	Montrose	0–2	Cowdenbeath	Links Park
		BBC Report	McGregor 6'; Fairbairn 81'	Attendance: 382; Referee: Muir

26 August 2008 League Cup round 2	Cowdenbeath	1–5	Dundee United	Central Park
	Dempster 74'	BBC Report	Daly 30', 47', 80'; Goodwillie 41', 60'	Attendance: 1,423; Referee: Norris

=== Scottish Cup ===
25 October 2008 Scottish Cup round 3	Cowdenbeath	1–2	Elgin City	Central Park
	McQuade 50'	BBC Report	Kaczan 27'; Wright 71'	Attendance: 328; Referee: Boyle

== League table ==
Pos	Team	Pld	W	D	L	GF	GA	GD	Pts	Promotion or qualification
1	Dumbarton (C, P)	36	19	10	7	65	36	+29	67	Promotion to the Second Division
2	Cowdenbeath (P)	36	18	9	9	48	34	+14	63 (Note: Cowdenbeath were promoted due to Livingston's demotion from the First Division to the Third.)	Qualification for the Second Division Play-offs (Note: The 2nd, 3rd and 4th placed teams will be entered into a play-off with the Second Division's 9th placed team. The winning team will be awarded a place in the 2009–10 Second Division.)
3	East Stirlingshire	36	19	4	13	57	50	+7	61	Qualification for the Second Division Play-offs
4	Stenhousemuir (O, P)	36	16	8	12	55	46	+9	56	Qualification for the Second Division Play-offs
5	Montrose	36	16	6	14	47	48	−1	54	

Source: BBC Sport
Rules for classification: 1) points; 2) goal difference; 3) number of goals scored.
(C) Champions; (O) Play-off winners; (P) Promoted

== Player statistics ==
=== Squad ===
No.	Pos	Nat	Player	Total		Scottish Third Division		Scottish Cup		League Cup		Other^{[a]}	
No.	Pos	Nat	Player	Apps	Goals	Apps	Goals	Apps	Goals	Apps	Goals	Apps	Goals
	GK	(Scotland) SCO	Scott Gallacher	8	0	7+0	0	1+0	0	0+0	0	0+0	0
	GK	(Scotland) SCO	David Hay	38	0	29+0	0	0+0	0	2+0	0	7+0	0
	DF	(Scotland) SCO	Kenny Adamson	29	2	21+4	2	0+0	0	1+0	0	3+0	0
	DF	(Scotland) SCO	John Armstrong	37	5	31+0	5	1+0	0	0+0	0	5+0	0
	DF	(Scotland) SCO	Mark Baxter	32	0	24+2	0	0+0	0	0+1	0	5+0	0
	DF	(Scotland) SCO	Gary Cennerazzo	3	0	1+0	0	0+0	0	0+0	0	2+0	0
	DF	(Scotland) SCO	Dene Droudge	6	0	3+1	0	1+0	0	1+0	0	0+0	0
	DF	(Scotland) SCO	Derek Fleming	31	0	19+5	0	1+0	0	1+1	0	2+2	0
	DF	(Scotland) SCO	Sandy Hodge	18	0	12+0	0	1+0	0	2+0	0	3+0	0
	DF	(Scotland) SCO	Scott Linton	14	0	5+4	0	0+0	0	0+0	0	4+1	0
	DF	(Scotland) SCO	Darren McGregor	43	4	34+0	1	1+0	0	2+0	1	5+1	2
	DF	(Scotland) SCO	Greg Ross	4	0	2+2	0	0+0	0	0+0	0	0+0	0
	DF	(Scotland) SCO	Joe Mbu	24	0	18+1	0	0+0	0	2+0	0	3+0	0
	DF	(Scotland) SCO	Jay Shields	30	0	20+2	0	0+0	0	2+0	0	6+0	0
	MF	(Scotland) SCO	John Gemmell	40	14	25+6	12	1+0	0	2+0	0	5+1	2
	MF	(Scotland) SCO	Brian Fairbairn	34	8	20+8	5	1+0	0	2+0	1	2+1	2
	MF	(Scotland) SCO	Mark Forbes	1	0	0+1	0	0+0	0	0+0	0	0+0	0
	MF	(Northern Ireland) NIR	Danny Lennon	1	0	0+1	0	0+0	0	0+0	0	0+0	0
	MF	(Scotland) SCO	Danny Mackay	26	1	21+1	1	0+0	0	1+0	0	2+1	0
	MF	(Scotland) SCO	John O'Neil	1	0	0+1	0	0+0	0	0+0	0	0+0	0
	MF	(Slovakia) SVK	Marek Tomana	33	1	18+9	1	1+0	0	0+2	0	0+3	0
	MF	(Scotland) SCO	Mark Ramsay	40	1	26+6	1	0+0	0	2+0	0	6+0	0
	MF	(Scotland) SCO	Jamie Reid	1	0	1+0	0	0+0	0	0+0	0	0+0	0
	MF	(Scotland) SCO	Jon Robertson	14	0	3+6	0	0+0	0	0+1	0	3+1	0
	MF	(Scotland) SCO	Jay Stein	24	3	10+9	2	0+1	0	0+0	0	4+0	1
	FW	(South Africa) RSA	Graeme Brown	17	1	8+9	1	0+0	0	0+0	0	0+0	0
	FW	(Scotland) SCO	John Dempster	33	6	17+9	5	1+0	0	0+1	1	1+4	0
	FW	(Scotland) SCO	John Ferguson	8	2	1+1	2	0+0	0	0+0	0	4+2	0
	FW	(Scotland) SCO	Paul McQuade	33	12	20+3	9	1+0	1	2+0	0	5+2	2
	FW	(Scotland) SCO	Callum Young	1	0	0+1	0	0+0	0	0+0	0	0+0	0
	FW	(Scotland) SCO	Derek Wallace	1	0	0+1	0	0+0	0	0+0	0	0+0	0

a. Includes other competitive competitions, including playoffs and the Scottish Challenge Cup.
