= 2009–10 Cowdenbeath F.C. season =

Cowdenbeath
2009–10 season
- Manager: Danny Lennon
- Stadium: Central Park
- Scottish Second Division: Third (promoted)
- Challenge Cup: Second Round, lost to v Dundee
- League Cup: First Round, lost to v Greenock Morton
- Scottish Cup: Third Round, lost to v Alloa Athletic
- Top goalscorer: League: Gareth Wardlaw (16); All: Gareth Wardlaw (19)

During the 2009–10 season Cowdenbeath competed in the Scottish Second Division, Scottish Cup, Scottish League Cup and the Challenge Cup.

== Summary ==
Cowdenbeath finished third in the First Division, entering the play-offs winning 3–0 over Brechin on aggregate and were promoted to the First Division. They reached the third round of the Scottish Cup, the first round of the League Cup and were eliminated in the second round of the Challenge Cup.

== Results & fixtures ==
Win Draw Loss

=== Scottish Second Division ===
| 8 August 2009 Second Division | Cowdenbeath | 1–2 | Arbroath | Central Park |
| | McBride 90' (Penalty) | ESPN Report | Sellars 81'; Scott 84' | Attendance: 302; Referee: Brown |

| 15 August 2009 Second Division | Brechin City | 3–1 | Cowdenbeath | Glebe Park |
| | Canning 31'; Harty 67' (Penalty); McAllister 78' | BBC Report | Dempster 40' | Attendance: 375; Referee: Somers |

| 22 August 2009 Second Division | Cowdenbeath | 1–1 | Alloa Athletic | Central Park |
| | Wardlaw 30' | ESPN Report | Scott 41' | Attendance: 365; Referee: Charleston |

| 29 August 2009 Second Division | East Fife | 1–1 | Cowdenbeath | Bayview Stadium |
| | McManus 70' | ESPN Report | Stein 12' | Attendance: 803; Referee: MacDonald |

| 12 September 2009 Second Division | Cowdenbeath | 1–0 | Clyde | Central Park |
| | Stein 23' | ESPN Report | | Attendance: 401; Referee: Hilland |

| 19 September 2009 Second Division | Dumbarton | 0–3 | Cowdenbeath | Strathclyde Homes Stadium |
| | | BBC Report | McBride 16', 53'; Wardlaw 23' | Attendance: 647; Referee: Hilland |

| 26 September 2009 Second Division | Cowdenbeath | 1–2 | Stirling Albion | Central Park |
| | McBride 4' | BBC Report | McKenna 16'; Grehan 42' | Attendance: 451; Referee: Robertson |

| 3 October 2009 Second Division | Stenhousemuir | 0–2 | Cowdenbeath | Ochilview Park |
| | | BBC Report | Robertson 39'; McBride 50' (Penalty) | Attendance: 539; Referee: Colvin |

| 10 October 2009 Second Division | Cowdenbeath | 5–0 | Peterhead | Central Park |
| | McQuade 24', 39'; Wardlaw 48', 85'; Robertson 83' | ESPN Report | | Attendance: 271; Referee: Madden |

| 17 October 2009 Second Division | Arbroath | 0–1 | Cowdenbeath | Gayfield Park |
| | | BBC Report | Linton 16' | Attendance: 479; Referee: MacKay |

| 24 October 2009 Second Division | Cowdenbeath | 0–0 | Brechin City | Central Park |
| | | ESPN Report | | Attendance: 337; Referee: Salmond |

| 31 October 2009 Second Division | Cowdenbeath | 2–1 | East Fife | Central Park |
| | Fairbairn 2'; Robertson 14' | BBC Report | Crawford 12' | Attendance: 733; Referee: Conroy |

| 7 November 2009 Second Division | Clyde | 0–1 | Cowdenbeath | Broadwood |
| | | ESPN Report | McBride 89' (Penalty) | Attendance: 691; Referee: Muir |

| 14 November 2009 Second Division | Cowdenbeath | 2–1 | Dumbarton | Central Park |
| | McQuade 18' (Penalty), 82' | BBC Report | Geggan 5' | Attendance: 389; Referee: Brines |

| 21 November 2009 Second Division | Stirling Albion | 2–2 | Cowdenbeath | Forthbank Stadium |
| | Forsyth 80' (Penalty); McKenna 87' | BBC Report | Wardlaw 11'; Ferguson 90' | Attendance: 682; Referee: McDermott |

| 11 December 2009 Second Division | Peterhead | 0–2 | Cowdenbeath | Balmoor |
| | | BBC Report | Robertson 22'; Mbu 55' | Attendance: 494; Referee: Northcroft |

| 15 December 2009 Second Division | Cowdenbeath | 2–1 | Stenhousemuir | Central Park |
| | Fairbairn 23'; McQuade 76' | BBC Report | Dalziel 21' | Attendance: 264; Referee: Salmond |

| 16 January 2010 Second Division | East Fife | 2–2 | Cowdenbeath | Bayview Stadium |
| | Linn 15'; Young 80' | BBC Report | Wardlaw 31', 87' | Attendance: 866; Referee: McKendrick |

| 23 January 2010 Second Division | Dumbarton | 2–1 | Cowdenbeath | Strathclyde Homes Stadium |
| | Hunter 64'; Clark 89' | BBC Report | Baxter 29' | Attendance: 659; Referee: Madden |

| 6 February 2010 Second Division | Cowdenbeath | 1–3 | Peterhead | Central Park |
| | Stein 75' | BBC Report | Bavidge 21', 64'; Wilson 90' | Attendance: 294; Referee: Colvin |

| 9 February 2010 Second Division | Alloa Athletic | 2–1 | Cowdenbeath | Recreation Park |
| | Prunty 16'; Noble 56' | BBC Report | McQuade 69' | Attendance: 638; Referee: Richmond |

| 13 February 2010 Second Division | Stenhousemuir | 0–0 | Cowdenbeath | Ochilview Park |
| | | BBC Report | | Attendance: 443; Referee: Watters |

| 6 March 2010 Second Division | Cowdenbeath | 6–2 | East Fife | Central Park |
| | Stein 34', 71'; Wardlaw 54'; McQuade 60'; McGregor 61'; Ramsay 69' | BBC Report | Crawford 52'; McManus 66' | Attendance: 667; Referee: Brines |

| 9 March 2010 Second Division | Cowdenbeath | 2–1 | Arbroath | Central Park |
| | McQuade 63'; McGregor 65' | ESPN Report | Lunan 18' | Attendance: 246; Referee: Robertson |

| 13 March 2010 Second Division | Clyde | 1–2 | Cowdenbeath | Broadwood |
| | Borisovs 83' | BBC Report | Wardlaw 45'; Dempster 67' | Attendance: 649; Referee: Clancy |

| 16 March 2010 Second Division | Cowdenbeath | 1–1 | Alloa Athletic | Central Park |
| | Dempster 84' | BBC Report | Ferguson 53' | Attendance: 413; Referee: Nicholls |

| 20 March 2010 Second Division | Cowdenbeath | 0–0 | Dumbarton | Central Park |
| | | BBC Report | | Attendance: 349; Referee: McDermott |

| 23 March 2010 Second Division | Cowdenbeath | 3–1 | Clyde | Central Park |
| | McQuade 32', 71'; Robertson 64' | BBC Report | White 1' | Attendance: 303; Referee: Nicholls |

| 27 March 2010 Second Division | Stirling Albion | 1–0 | Cowdenbeath | Forthbank Stadium |
| | Mullen 79' | BBC Report | | Attendance: 575; Referee: Watters |

| 3 April 2010 Second Division | Cowdenbeath | 1–0 | Stenhousemuir | Central Park |
| | Wardlaw 71' | BBC Report | | Attendance: 438; Referee: Collum |

| 10 April 2010 Second Division | Peterhead | 1–0 | Cowdenbeath | Balmoor |
| | Bavidge 70' | BBC Report | | Attendance: 435; Referee: Beaton |

| 17 April 2010 Second Division | Arbroath | 1–1 | Cowdenbeath | Gayfield Park |
| | Gibson 41' | BBC Report | Wardlaw 75' | Attendance: 488; Referee: O'Reilly |

| 20 April 2010 Second Division | Brechin City | 3–3 | Cowdenbeath | Glebe Park |
| | McAllister 51', 54'; Vallers 86' | ESPN Report | Wardlaw 2', 30'; McGregor 6' | Attendance: 304; Referee: MacDonald |

| 24 April 2010 Second Division | Cowdenbeath | 4–0 | Brechin City | Central Park |
| | McQuade 27', 57'; McGregor 35'; Wardlaw 47' | ESPN Report | | Attendance: 391; Referee: Law |

| 27 April 2010 Second Division | Cowdenbeath | 3–3 | Stirling Albion | Central Park |
| | McGregor 5'; Wardlaw 23', 38' | BBC Report | Russell 52', 87'; Graham 90' | Attendance: 1,084; Referee: Robertson |

| 1 May 2010 Second Division | Alloa Athletic | 3–1 | Cowdenbeath | Recreation Park |
| | Prunty 73'; Scott 78' (Penalty), 82' | BBC Report | Dempster 26' | Attendance: 1,125; Referee: Charleston |

=== First Division play-offs ===
| 5 May 2010 Play-offs SF R1 | Cowdenbeath | 1–1 | Alloa Athletic | Central Park |
| | Dempster 90+3' | BBC Sport | Gormley 16' | Attendance: 578 |

| 8 May 2010 Play-offs SF R2 | Alloa Athletic | 0–2 | Cowdenbeath | Recreation Park |
| | | BBC Sport | Wardlaw 59'; McQuade 82' | Attendance: 1,234 |

| 12 May 2010 Play-offs Final R1 | Cowdenbeath | 0–0 | Brechin City | Central Park |
| | | BBC Sport | | Attendance: 1,119 |

| 16 May 2010 Play-offs Final R2 | Brechin City | 0–3 | Cowdenbeath | Glebe Park |
| | | BBC Sport | Mbu 17'; Wardlaw 25', 45+4' | Attendance: 1,627 |

=== Challenge Cup ===
| 25 July 2009 Challenge Cup round 1 | Peterhead | 1–2 | Cowdenbeath | Balmoor Stadium |
| | Bavidge 12' | SFL Report | McBride 52'; McQuade 61' | Attendance: 361; Referee: Northcroft |

| 18 August 2009 Challenge Cup round 2 | Cowdenbeath | 0–3 | Dundee | Central Park |
| | | SFL Report | Griffiths 20'; Harkins 82'; Antoine-Curier 88' | Attendance: 457; Referee: Salmond |

=== League Cup ===
| 1 August 2009 League Cup round 1 | Cowdenbeath | 1–3 | Greenock Morton | Central Park |
| | McQuade 31' (Penalty) | SFL Report | Weatherson 7', 51'; MacFarlane 12' | Attendance: 486; Referee: Winter |

=== Scottish Cup ===
| 28 November 2009 Scottish Cup round 3 | Cowdenbeath | 0 – 0 | Alloa Athletic | Central Park |
| | | BBC Report | | Attendance: 377; Referee: Colvin |

| 8 December 2009 Scottish Cup round 3 Replay | Alloa Athletic | 1 – 0 | Cowdenbeath | Recreation Park |
| | Gilhaney 88' | BBC Report | | Referee: Colvin |

== League table ==
| Pos | Team | Pld | W | D | L | GF | GA | GD | Pts | Promotion, qualification or relegation |
|---|---|---|---|---|---|---|---|---|---|---|
| 1 | Stirling Albion (C, P) | 36 | 18 | 11 | 7 | 68 | 48 | +20 | 65 | Promotion to the First Division |
| 2 | Alloa Athletic | 36 | 19 | 8 | 9 | 49 | 35 | +14 | 65 | Qualification for the First Division play-offs (Note: The 2nd, 3rd and 4th placed teams will be entered into a play-off with the First Division's 9th placed team. The winning team will be awarded a place in the 2010–11 First Division.) |
| 3 | Cowdenbeath (O, P) | 36 | 16 | 11 | 9 | 60 | 41 | +19 | 59 | Qualification for the First Division play-offs |
| 4 | Brechin City | 36 | 15 | 9 | 12 | 47 | 42 | +5 | 54 | Qualification for the First Division play-offs |
| 5 | Peterhead | 36 | 15 | 6 | 15 | 45 | 49 | −4 | 51 | |

Source: Scottish Football League
Rules for classification: 1) points; 2) goal difference; 3) number of goals scored.
(C) Champions; (O) Play-off winners; (P) Promoted

== Player statistics ==
=== Squad ===
| No. | Pos | Nat | Player | Total | | Scottish Second Division | | Scottish Cup | | League Cup | | Other^{[a]} | |
| No. | Pos | Nat | Player | Apps | Goals | Apps | Goals | Apps | Goals | Apps | Goals | Apps | Goals |
|---|---|---|---|---|---|---|---|---|---|---|---|---|---|
| | GK | | Kris Bower | 1 | 0 | 0+1 | 0 | 0+0 | 0 | 0+0 | 0 | 0+0 | 0 |
| | GK | (Scotland) SCO | David Hay | 43 | 0 | 34+0 | 0 | 2+0 | 0 | 1+0 | 0 | 6+0 | 0 |
| | GK | (Canada) CAN | Cameron McKay | 2 | 0 | 1+1 | 0 | 0+0 | 0 | 0+0 | 0 | 0+0 | 0 |
| | GK | | Artur Veiculis | 1 | 0 | 1+0 | 0 | 0+0 | 0 | 0+0 | 0 | 0+0 | 0 |
| | DF | (Scotland) SCO | Kenny Adamson | 33 | 0 | 20+5 | 0 | 2+0 | 0 | 1+0 | 0 | 5+0 | 0 |
| | DF | (Scotland) SCO | John Armstrong | 31 | 0 | 26+0 | 0 | 2+0 | 0 | 0+0 | 0 | 3+0 | 0 |
| | DF | (Scotland) SCO | Mark Baxter | 30 | 1 | 14+9 | 1 | 0+0 | 0 | 1+0 | 0 | 6+0 | 0 |
| | DF | (Northern Ireland) NIR | Peter Bradley | 1 | 0 | 1+0 | 0 | 0+0 | 0 | 0+0 | 0 | 0+0 | 0 |
| | DF | (Scotland) SCO | Dene Droudge | 30 | 0 | 25+1 | 0 | 2+0 | 0 | 0+1 | 0 | 1+0 | 0 |
| | DF | (Scotland) SCO | Scott Linton | 33 | 1 | 24+2 | 1 | 0+2 | 0 | 1+0 | 0 | 3+1 | 0 |
| | DF | (Scotland) SCO | Darren McGregor | 21 | 5 | 16+1 | 5 | 0+0 | 0 | 0+0 | 0 | 4+0 | 0 |
| | DF | (Scotland) SCO | Joe Mbu | 41 | 2 | 32+0 | 1 | 2+0 | 0 | 1+0 | 0 | 6+0 | 1 |
| | DF | (Scotland) SCO | Jay Shields | 3 | 0 | 3+0 | 0 | 0+0 | 0 | 0+0 | 0 | 0+0 | 0 |
| | MF | (Scotland) SCO | Brian Fairbairn | 40 | 2 | 24+7 | 2 | 1+1 | 0 | 0+1 | 0 | 5+1 | 0 |
| | MF | (Scotland) SCO | Danny Mackay | 1 | 0 | 0+1 | 0 | 0+0 | 0 | 0+0 | 0 | 0+0 | 0 |
| | MF | (Scotland) SCO | Scott McBride | 33 | 7 | 16+8 | 6 | 2+0 | 0 | 1+0 | 0 | 5+1 | 1 |
| | MF | (Scotland) SCO | Neil McCabe | 6 | 0 | 0+4 | 0 | 0+0 | 0 | 1+0 | 0 | 1+0 | 0 |
| | MF | (Slovakia) SVK | Marek Tomana | 2 | 0 | 0+1 | 0 | 0+0 | 0 | 0+0 | 0 | 0+1 | 0 |
| | MF | (Scotland) SCO | Mark Ramsay | 37 | 1 | 18+14 | 1 | 2+0 | 0 | 0+0 | 0 | 1+2 | 0 |
| | MF | (Scotland) SCO | Jon Robertson | 39 | 5 | 31+1 | 5 | 2+0 | 0 | 1+0 | 0 | 3+1 | 0 |
| | MF | (Scotland) SCO | Jay Stein | 38 | 5 | 19+13 | 5 | 2+0 | 0 | 1+0 | 0 | 1+2 | 0 |
| | MF | (Scotland) SCO | Craig Winter | 33 | 0 | 26+3 | 0 | 1+0 | 0 | 0+0 | 0 | 3+0 | 0 |
| | MF | (Scotland) SCO | Dean Brett | 1 | 0 | 1+0 | 0 | 0+0 | 0 | 0+0 | 0 | 0+0 | 0 |
| | MF | (Scotland) SCO | Derek Wallace | 1 | 0 | 0+1 | 0 | 0+0 | 0 | 0+0 | 0 | 0+0 | 0 |
| | FW | (Scotland) SCO | John Dempster | 23 | 5 | 5+12 | 4 | 0+0 | 0 | 0+1 | 0 | 1+4 | 1 |
| | FW | (Scotland) SCO | John Ferguson | 11 | 1 | 0+7 | 1 | 0+2 | 0 | 0+0 | 0 | 0+2 | 0 |
| | FW | (Scotland) SCO | Paul McQuade | 38 | 15 | 26+5 | 12 | 0+0 | 0 | 1+0 | 1 | 6+0 | 2 |
| | FW | (Scotland) SCO | Gareth Wardlaw | 40 | 19 | 31+0 | 16 | 2+0 | 0 | 1+0 | 0 | 6+0 | 3 |
| | | | Trialist | 2 | 0 | 2+0 | 0 | 0+0 | 0 | 0+0 | 0 | 0+0 | 0 |

a. Includes other competitive competitions, including playoffs and the Scottish Challenge Cup.
