= 2010–11 Cowdenbeath F.C. season =

Cowdenbeath
2010–11 season
- Chairman: Donald Findlay
- Manager: Jimmy Nicholl
- Stadium: Central Park
- Scottish First Division: Ninth (relegated)
- Scottish Cup: Third Round, lost to v Peterhead
- League Cup: First Round, lost to v Clyde
- Challenge Cup: Second Round, lost to v Ayr United
- Top goalscorer: League: Greg Stewart (9); All: Greg Stewart (9)

During the 2010–11 season Cowdenbeath competed in the Scottish First Division, Scottish Cup, Scottish League Cup and the Challenge Cup.

== Summary ==
Cowdenbeath finished ninth in the First Division, entering the play-offs losing 4–2 to Brechin on aggregate and were relegated to the Second Division. They reached the third round of the Scottish Cup, the first round of the League Cup and were eliminated in the second round of the Challenge Cup.

=== Management ===
For season 2010–11 Cowdenbeath were managed by Jimmy Nicholl, following the departure of Danny Lennon who had become the new manager of St Mirren.

== Results and fixtures ==
Win Draw Loss

=== Scottish First Division ===
| 7 August 2010 First Division | Cowdenbeath | 0–2 | Ross County | Central Park |
| | | SFL Report | Gardyne 52'; Di Giacomo 82' | Attendance: 481; Referee: Winter |

| 14 August 2010 First Division | Stirling Albion | 1–3 | Cowdenbeath | Forthbank Stadium |
| | Robertson 34'; Aitken (yellow card) 73' (red card) | SFL Report | Sibanda 61'; Brett 70'; Dempster 77' | Attendance: 820; Referee: Tumilty |

| 22 August 2010 First Division | Cowdenbeath | 1–3 | Queen of the South | Central Park |
| | McKenzie 65' | SFL Report | Burns 3'; Holmes 54'; McGuffie 86'; Lilley (yellow card) 87' (red card) | Attendance: 672; Referee: Somers |

| 28 August 2010 First Division | Cowdenbeath | 2–1 | Partick Thistle | Central Park |
| | Fairbairn 18'; Armstrong 54' | SFL Report | Doolan 18' | Attendance: 881; Referee: McLean |

| 11 September 2010 First Division | Greenock Morton | 1–2 | Cowdenbeath | Cappielow Park |
| | Kean 59' | SFL Report | Ramsay 52'; Dempster 72' | Attendance: 1,839; Referee: Colvin |

| 18 September 2010 First Division | Dunfermline Athletic | 2–1 | Cowdenbeath | East End Park |
| | Bell 64'; Cardle 77' | SFL Report | Dempster 7' | Attendance: 4,316; Referee: Richmond |

| 25 September 2010 First Division | Cowdenbeath | 2–1 | Dundee | Central Park |
| | Ramsay 12'; Fairbairn 44' | SFL Report | Griffiths 82' | Attendance: 1,154; Referee: Charleston |

| 2 October 2010 First Division | Falkirk | 5–1 | Cowdenbeath | Falkirk Stadium |
| | Compton 11'; Stewart 22'; Millar 34', 79' (Penalty); Finnigan 69' | SFL Report | Ramsay 83' (Penalty) | Attendance: 3,764; Referee: Nicholls |

| 16 October 2010 First Division | Cowdenbeath | 1–2 | Raith Rovers | Central Park |
| | Cameron 79' | SFL Report | Baird 88'; Simmons 92' | Attendance: 1,508; Referee: Madden |

| 23 October 2010 First Division | Cowdenbeath | 2–2 | Greenock Morton | Central Park |
| | Hay (red card) 7'; McKenzie 16'; Cameron 24' | SFL Report | Graham 10'; Jenkins 45' | Attendance: 582; Referee: Finnie |

| 30 October 2010 First Division | Partick Thistle | 1–0 | Cowdenbeath | Firhill Stadium |
| | Buchanan 53' | SFL Report | | Attendance: 1,841; Referee: Charleston |

| 6 November 2010 First Division | Cowdenbeath | 5–1 | Stirling Albion | Central Park |
| | Allison 19' (Own goal); Stewart 27'; Ramsay 53'; Fairbairn 73'; Miller 82' | SFL Report | Smith 9'; Allison (red card) 24'; Borris (red card) 71' | Attendance: 507; Referee: McDermott |

| 13 November 2010 First Division | Queen of the South | 3–0 | Cowdenbeath | Palmerston Park |
| | Burns 20'; Conroy 34'; McLaren 80' | SFL Report | | Attendance: 1,782; Referee: Conroy |

| 14 December 2010 First Division | Dundee | 3–0 | Cowdenbeath | Dens Park |
| | Forsyth 37'; Riley 66'; McKeown 68' | SFL Report | | Attendance: 3,503; Referee: McLean |

| 29 December 2010 First Division | Dunfermline Athletic | 5–0 | Cowdenbeath | East End Park |
| | Kirk 28'; Clarke 63', 86'; Phinn 68'; Linton 89' (o.g.) | SFL Report | | Attendance: 2,942; Referee: Madden |

| 15 January 2011 First Division | Greenock Morton | 3–0 | Cowdenbeath | Cappielow Park |
| | O'Brien 33'; Jenkins 54'; Graham 57' | SFL Report | | Attendance: 1,375; Referee: Mike Tumilty |

| 5 February 2011 First Division | Ross County | 1–1 | Cowdenbeath | Victoria Park |
| | Marr 30' | SFL Report | Fitzpatrick 52' (Own goal) | Attendance: 2,020; Referee: Winter |

| 12 February 2011 First Division | Cowdenbeath | 0–4 | Dunfermline Athletic | Central Park |
| | | SFL Report | Graham 46', 75'; Buchanan 69'; Kirk 84' | Attendance: 2,192; Referee: McKendrick |

| 15 February 2011 First Division | Cowdenbeath | 1–1 | Partick Thistle | Central Park |
| | Campbell 8' (pen.) | SFL Report | Flannigan 85' | Attendance: 411; Referee: Charleston |

| 19 February 2011 First Division | Cowdenbeath | 0–3 | Raith Rovers | Central Park |
| | | SFL Report | Baird 18'; Simmons 24'; Campbell 31' | Attendance: 1,413; Referee: Law |

| 26 February 2011 First Division | Falkirk | 2–0 | Cowdenbeath | Falkirk Stadium |
| | Murdoch 20'; Flynn 55' | SFL Report | | Attendance: 3,581; Referee: Nicholls |

| 1 March 2011 First Division | Cowdenbeath | 2–2 | Queen of the South | Central Park |
| | Campbell 36' (Penalty); Stewart 92' | SFL Report | Weatherston 17'; McMenamin 84' | Attendance: 670; Referee: Allan |

| 5 March 2011 First Division | Stirling Albion | 3–4 | Cowdenbeath | Forthbank Stadium |
| | Welsh 40'; Mullen 58', 67'; Buist (yellow card) 81' (red card) | SFL Report | Ramsay 77', 82' (Penalty); Campbell 89'; Stewart 92' | Attendance: 735; Referee: Norris |

| 8 March 2011 First Division | Cowdenbeath | 1–3 | Dundee | Central Park |
| | Stewart 55' | SFL Report | Higgins 23'; Lockwood 48' (pen.); Forsyth 85' | Attendance: 977; Referee: Colvin |

| 15 March 2011 First Division | Raith Rovers | 2–1 | Cowdenbeath | Stark's Park |
| | Tade 45'; Baird 85' | SFL Report | Stewart 51' | Attendance: 1,495; Referee: Murray |

| 19 March 2011 First Division | Partick Thistle | 0–1 | Cowdenbeath | Firhill Stadium |
| | | SFL Report | Stewart 50' | Attendance: 1,754; Referee: McLean |

| 22 March 2011 First Division | Cowdenbeath | 0–2 | Greenock Morton | Central Park |
| | | SFL Report | Monti 2' (Penalty); Jenkins 60' | Attendance: 359; Referee: Brines |

| 26 March 2011 First Division | Dundee | 2–2 | Cowdenbeath | Dens Park |
| | Hyde 24', 73' | SFL Report | Crawford 9'; Linton 57' | Attendance: 4,311; Referee: Finnie |

| 29 March 2011 First Division | Cowdenbeath | 0–0 | Falkirk | Central Park |
| | | SFL Report | | Attendance: 803; Referee: McKendrick |

| 2 April 2011 First Division | Cowdenbeath | 0–1 | Dunfermline Athletic | Central Park |
| | | SFL Report | Buchanan 60' | Attendance: 2,104; Referee: Northcroft |

| 5 April 2011 First Division | Cowdenbeath | 2–1 | Ross County | Central Park |
| | Ramsay 6'; Linton 21' | SFL Report | Brittain 87' (Penalty) | Attendance: 296; Referee: Madden |

| 9 April 2011 First Division | Raith Rovers | 2–2 | Cowdenbeath | Stark's Park |
| | Murray 60'; Campbell 89' | SFL Report | Stewart 55', 70' | Attendance: 2,284; Referee: Winter |

| 16 April 2011 First Division | Cowdenbeath | 1–2 | Falkirk | Central Park |
| | Stewart 32' | SFL Report | Stewart 65'; McLean 69' | Attendance: 636; Referee: Robertson |

| 23 April 2011 First Division | Queen of the South | 2–2 | Cowdenbeath | Palmerston Park |
| | Carmichael 17'; Holmes 45'; Reid (red card) 76' | SFL Report | Campbell 2', 31' (Penalty); Adamson (red card) 84'; Cameron (red card) 87' | Attendance: 1,102; Referee: Charleston |

| 30 April 2011 First Division | Cowdenbeath | 1–0 | Stirling Albion | Central Park |
| | Crawford 79' | SFL Report | | Attendance: 415; Referee: Murray |

| 7 May 2011 First Division | Ross County | 3–0 | Cowdenbeath | Victoria Park |
| | Morrison 32'; Boyd 83'; Corcoran 89' | SFL Report | | Attendance: 2,886; Referee: Allan |

=== First Division play-offs ===
| 11 May 2011 Play-offs SF R1 | Brechin City | 2–2 | Cowdenbeath | Glebe Park |
| | Kirkpatrick 46'; Megginson 51' | BBC Report | Linton 4'; Coult 26' | Attendance: 596; Referee: Law |

| 14 May 2011 Play-offs SF R2 | Cowdenbeath | 0–2 | Brechin City | Central Park |
| | | BBC Report | Redman 78'; Molloy 84' | Attendance: 645; Referee: Somers |

=== Scottish Challenge Cup ===
| 24 July 2010 Challenge Cup round 1 | Raith Rovers | 0–1 | Cowdenbeath | Stark's Park |
| | | SFL Report | Armstrong 58' | Attendance: 1,564; Referee: McDermott |

| 10 August 2010 Challenge Cup round 2 | Ayr United | 2–0 | Cowdenbeath | Somerset Park |
| | Campbell 63'; Roberts 73' | SFL Report | | Attendance: 556; Referee: Madden |

=== Scottish League Cup ===
| 31 July 2010 League Cup round 1 | Clyde | 2–1 | Cowdenbeath | Broadwood Stadium |
| | McCusker 58', 67' | BBC Report | Ramsay 78' | Attendance: 667; Referee: Colvin |

=== Scottish Cup ===
| 20 November 2010 Scottish Cup round 3 | Peterhead | 2 – 0 | Cowdenbeath | Balmoor Stadium |
| | Strachan 42'; McVitie 50' | BBC Report; SFA Report | | Attendance: 510; Referee: Watters |

== Player statistics ==
=== Squad ===
| No. | Pos | Nat | Player | Total | | Scottish First Division | | Scottish Cup | | League Cup | | Other^{[a]} | |
| No. | Pos | Nat | Player | Apps | Goals | Apps | Goals | Apps | Goals | Apps | Goals | Apps | Goals |
|---|---|---|---|---|---|---|---|---|---|---|---|---|---|
| | GK | (Scotland) SCO | David Hay | 36 | 0 | 30+0 | 0 | 1+0 | 0 | 1+0 | 0 | 3+1 | 0 |
| | GK | (France) FRA | Ludovic Roy | 7 | 0 | 6+0 | 0 | 0+0 | 0 | 0+0 | 0 | 1+0 | 0 |
| | GK | (Scotland) SCO | Lee Wilson | 1 | 0 | 0+1 | 0 | 0+0 | 0 | 0+0 | 0 | 0+0 | 0 |
| | DF | (Scotland) SCO | Kenny Adamson | 30 | 0 | 26+0 | 0 | 0+0 | 0 | 1+0 | 0 | 3+0 | 0 |
| | DF | (Scotland) SCO | John Armstrong | 27 | 2 | 21+0 | 1 | 1+0 | 0 | 1+0 | 0 | 4+0 | 1 |
| | DF | (Scotland) SCO | Mark Baxter | 32 | 0 | 26+0 | 0 | 1+0 | 0 | 1+0 | 0 | 4+0 | 0 |
| | DF | (Scotland) SCO | Paul Byrne | 2 | 0 | 2+0 | 0 | 0+0 | 0 | 0+0 | 0 | 0+0 | 0 |
| | DF | (Scotland) SCO | Scott Linton | 39 | 3 | 28+5 | 2 | 1+0 | 0 | 1+0 | 0 | 4+0 | 1 |
| | DF | (Scotland) SCO | Bob Malcolm | 2 | 0 | 2+0 | 0 | 0+0 | 0 | 0+0 | 0 | 0+0 | 0 |
| | DF | (Scotland) SCO | Joe Mbu | 10 | 0 | 8+1 | 0 | 1+0 | 0 | 0+0 | 0 | 0+0 | 0 |
| | DF | (Scotland) SCO | Thomas O'Brien | 17 | 0 | 10+3 | 0 | 0+0 | 0 | 1+0 | 0 | 3+0 | 0 |
| | DF | (New Zealand) NZL | Steven Old | 4 | 0 | 4+0 | 0 | 0+0 | 0 | 0+0 | 0 | 0+0 | 0 |
| | DF | (Northern Ireland) NIR | Richard Vauls | 9 | 0 | 6+3 | 0 | 0+0 | 0 | 0+0 | 0 | 0+0 | 0 |
| | MF | (Scotland) SCO | Colin Cameron | 31 | 2 | 25+1 | 2 | 1+0 | 0 | 1+0 | 0 | 3+0 | 0 |
| | MF | (Scotland) SCO | Brian Fairbairn | 16 | 3 | 7+5 | 3 | 1+0 | 0 | 1+0 | 0 | 1+1 | 0 |
| | MF | (England) ENG | Lee Makel | 11 | 0 | 9+1 | 0 | 0+0 | 0 | 0+0 | 0 | 1+0 | 0 |
| | MF | (Scotland) SCO | Kyle Miller | 9 | 1 | 7+2 | 1 | 0+0 | 0 | 0+0 | 0 | 0+0 | 0 |
| | MF | (Scotland) SCO | Mark Ramsay | 41 | 8 | 31+4 | 7 | 0+1 | 0 | 1+0 | 1 | 4+0 | 0 |
| | MF | (Scotland) SCO | Jon Robertson | 24 | 0 | 17+5 | 0 | 0+0 | 0 | 0+0 | 0 | 2+0 | 0 |
| | MF | (Scotland) SCO | Mark Smith | 5 | 0 | 3+2 | 0 | 0+0 | 0 | 0+0 | 0 | 0+0 | 0 |
| | MF | (Scotland) SCO | Craig Winter | 33 | 0 | 30+0 | 0 | 1+0 | 0 | 0+0 | 0 | 2+0 | 0 |
| | MF | (Scotland) SCO | Dean Brett | 6 | 1 | 3+2 | 1 | 0+0 | 0 | 0+0 | 0 | 0+1 | 0 |
| | FW | (Scotland) SCO | Archie Campbell | 17 | 5 | 13+4 | 5 | 0+0 | 0 | 0+0 | 0 | 0+0 | 0 |
| | FW | (Scotland) SCO | Lewis Coult | 19 | 1 | 8+9 | 0 | 0+0 | 0 | 0+0 | 0 | 1+1 | 1 |
| | FW | (Scotland) SCO | Stevie Crawford | 20 | 2 | 15+3 | 2 | 0+0 | 0 | 0+0 | 0 | 2+0 | 0 |
| | FW | (Scotland) SCO | John Ferguson | 8 | 0 | 4+3 | 0 | 0+1 | 0 | 0+0 | 0 | 0+0 | 0 |
| | FW | (Scotland) SCO | Marc McKenzie | 35 | 2 | 16+14 | 2 | 0+1 | 0 | 1+0 | 0 | 2+1 | 0 |
| | FW | (Scotland) SCO | Lee Sibanda | 13 | 1 | 4+7 | 1 | 1+0 | 0 | 0+0 | 0 | 0+1 | 0 |
| | FW | (Scotland) SCO | Greg Stewart | 38 | 9 | 16+16 | 9 | 1+0 | 0 | 0+1 | 0 | 2+2 | 0 |
| | FW | (Scotland) SCO | John Dempster | 22 | 3 | 17+1 | 3 | 1+0 | 0 | 1+0 | 0 | 2+0 | 0 |

a. Includes other competitive competitions, including playoffs and the Scottish Challenge Cup.

== League table ==
| Pos | Team | Pld | W | D | L | GF | GA | GD | Pts | Promotion, qualification or relegation |
|---|---|---|---|---|---|---|---|---|---|---|
| 6 | Dundee | 36 | 19 | 12 | 5 | 54 | 34 | +20 | 44 (Note: Dundee were docked 25 points for entering administration. The deduction was temporarily lifted pending an appeal by the club, however the appeal failed and the deduction was reinstated.) | |
| 7 | Greenock Morton | 36 | 11 | 10 | 15 | 39 | 43 | −4 | 43 | |
| 8 | Ross County | 36 | 9 | 14 | 13 | 30 | 34 | −4 | 41 | |
| 9 | Cowdenbeath (R) | 36 | 9 | 8 | 19 | 41 | 72 | −31 | 35 | Qualification for the First Division play-offs |
| 10 | Stirling Albion (R) | 36 | 4 | 8 | 24 | 32 | 82 | −50 | 20 | Relegation to the Second Division |

Source: SPFL
Rules for classification: 1) points; 2) goal difference; 3) number of goals scored.
(R) Relegated
