= Jon Robertson =

Scottish footballer (born 1989)

Personal information
- Date of birth: 25 April 1989 (age 37)
- Place of birth: Edinburgh, Scotland
- Height: 5 ft 11 in (1.80 m)
- Position: Midfielder

Team information
- Current team: Broxburn Athletic

Senior career*
Years	Team	Apps	(Gls)
2008–2012	Cowdenbeath	107	(10)
2008–2009	→ Stoneyburn (loan)		
2008–2009	→ Rosyth (loan)		
2012–2013	St Mirren	20	(0)
2013	→ Cowdenbeath (loan)	4	(0)
2013–2015	Cowdenbeath	61	(3)
2015–2016	Stenhousemuir	32	(2)
2016–2024	Alloa Athletic	199	(1)
2024–2025	Edinburgh City	31	(2)
2025–	Broxburn athletic	0	(0)
- * Club domestic league appearances and goals as of 22:04, 18 February 2024 (UTC)

Jon Robertson (born 25 April 1989) is a Scottish professional footballer who plays as a midfielder for lowland league side Broxburn Athletic.

He was previously with Cowdenbeath on three occasions, St Mirren, Stenhousemuir, Alloa Athletic, Broxburn Athletic and also Stoneyburn and Rosyth on loan.

== Career ==
Robertson began his career as a youth player for Hearts before joining Murieston Boys Club.

=== Cowdenbeath ===
Robertson signed for Cowdenbeath and made his first team debut as a substitute on 5 January 2008, in a Scottish Second Division match against Ayr United. In all he made 12 appearances in his debut season.

During the 2008–09 season he went on loan to junior sides Stoneyburn and Rosyth. Robertson was made captain of Cowdenbeath at the age of 22, for season 2011–12 and led the club to the Second Division title. He was nominated for the PFA Scotland Second Division Player of the Year award in April 2012.

=== St Mirren ===
On 6 February 2012, Robertson signed a pre-contract agreement with Scottish Premier League side St Mirren. He joined them in the summer and signed a two-year contract. Robertson was given the number eight shirt. On 4 August 2012, he made his club debut, coming on as an 80th-minute substitute in a Scottish Premier League match against Inverness, replacing Gary Teale in a 2–2 draw. His first goal came on 1 December 2012, scoring the final goal in a 2–0 win over Brechin City in the Scottish Cup. He was then sent out on loan to Cowdenbeath at the end of January 2013.

=== Cowdenbeath ===
On 31 January 2013, Robertson returned to Scottish First Division side Cowdenbeath on a months loan deal.

On 29 August 2013, Robertson again returned to Cowdenbeath, this time on a permanent deal. He made his 'third' debut for the club on 31 August 2013, scoring in a 3–2 win against Dumbarton.

=== Stenhousemuir ===
At the end of the 2014–15 season, Roberston left Cowdenbeath and signed a one-year contract with fellow Scottish League One side Stenhousemuir. After one season with the Warriors, Robertson was released by the club in May 2016.

=== Alloa Athletic ===
Shortly after his release from Stenhousemuir, Robertson signed for recently relegated side Alloa Athletic.

In July 2023, Robertson signed a one-year deal with Alloa until June 2024.

=== Edinburgh City ===
On 27 June 2024, Robertson signed with Edinburgh City, becoming captain at the club.

== Career statistics ==
As of 24 April 2021

Appearances and goals by club, season and competition
Club	Season	League			Scottish Cup		League Cup		Other		Total	
Club	Season	Division	Apps	Goals	Apps	Goals	Apps	Goals	Apps	Goals	Apps	Goals
Cowdenbeath	2007–08	Scottish Second Division	10	0	1	0	0	0	1 (Note: Appearance in the Scottish Second Division play-offs)	0	12	0
Cowdenbeath	2008–09	Scottish Third Division	9	0	0	0	1	0	4 (Note: One appearance in the Scottish Challenge Cup and three appearances in the Scottish Second Division Play-offs)	0	14	0
Cowdenbeath	2009–10	Scottish Second Division	31	5	2	0	1	0	4 (Note: Two appearances in the Scottish Challenge Cup and two appearances in the Scottish First Division play-offs)	0	38	5
Cowdenbeath	2010–11	Scottish First Division	22	0	0	0	0	0	2 (Note: Appearances in the Scottish First Division play-offs)	0	24	0
Cowdenbeath	2011–12	Scottish Second Division	35	5	2	2	1	0	1 (Note: Appearances in the Scottish Challenge Cup)	0	39	7
Cowdenbeath	Total		107	10	5	2	3	0	12	0	127	12
St Mirren	2012–13	Scottish Premier League	19	0	1	1	1	0	0	0	21	1
St Mirren	2013–14	Scottish Premiership	1	0	0	0	0	0	0	0	1	0
St Mirren	Total		20	0	1	1	1	0	0	0	22	1
Cowdenbeath (loan)	2012–13	Scottish First Division	4	0	0	0	0	0	0	0	4	0
Cowdenbeath	2013–14	Scottish Championship	30	1	0	0	0	0	4 (Note: Appearances in the Scottish Championship play-offs)	0	34	1
Cowdenbeath	2014–15	Scottish Championship	31	2	1	0	2	0	1	0	35	2
Cowdenbeath	Total		61	3	1	0	2	0	5	0	69	3
Stenhousemuir	2015–16	Scottish League One	32	2	2	0	1	0	2	0	37	2
Alloa Athletic	2016–17	Scottish League One	30	1	1	0	6	1	7 (Note: Three appearances in the Scottish Challenge Cup and four appearances in the Scottish Championship play-offs)	2	44	4
Alloa Athletic	2017–18	Scottish League One	35	0	2	0	3	0	6 (Note: Two appearances in the Scottish Challenge Cup and four appearances in the Scottish Championship play-offs)	0	46	0
Alloa Athletic	2018–19	Scottish Championship	26	0	2	0	4	0	4	0	36	0
Alloa Athletic	2019–20	Scottish Championship	24	0	2	0	4	0	2	0	32	0
Alloa Athletic	2020–21	Scottish Championship	25	0	1	0	4	0	—		30	0
Alloa Athletic	Total		140	1	8	0	21	1	19	2	188	4
Career total			364	16	17	3	28	1	38	2	447	22
