= Scott Linton =

Scottish footballer

Personal information
- Full name: Scott Linton
- Date of birth: 6 September 1989 (age 37)
- Place of birth: Glasgow, Scotland
- Position: Defender

Youth career
- Hibernian

Senior career*
Years	Team	Apps	(Gls)
2008–2013	Cowdenbeath	133	(10)
2013–2015	Dumbarton	57	(0)
2015–2017	Clyde	58	(10)
2017–2019	East Fife	38	(4)
2019–2020	Kelty Hearts	32	(18)
Total		318	(42)
- * Club domestic league appearances and goals

Scott Linton (born 6 September 1989), is a Scottish former footballer who played as a defender or midfielder.

He has previously played for Hibernian as a youth player, as well as Cowdenbeath, Dumbarton, Clyde, East Fife and Kelty Hearts.

== Career ==
=== Cowdenbeath ===
Born in Glasgow, Linton signed for Cowdenbeath in January 2008. He made over 100 appearances for the 'Blue Brazil'.

=== Dumbarton ===
In June 2013 he signed for Dumbarton. He scored his first goal for Dumbarton in November 2013, against Berwick Rangers. On 20 May 2014 Linton agreed a new one-year deal with the club. He left the club on 5 May 2015 having made a total of 67 appearances for the club, scoring once.

=== Clyde ===
He signed a pre contract agreement at Clyde FC in April 2015 for the 2015–16 season. Scoring the winner on his league debut away against Stirling Albion He became Clyde's regular penalty taker despite never having taken one at senior level before joining the club. On 12 September 2015, Linton scored in a 4–2 win against Annan Athletic at Broadwood. He the scored the winner at Queen's Park in the play-off final second leg, but Clyde lost 3–2 on aggregate and failed to win promotion from League Two. Linton made 41 appearances in all competitions in 2015–16, finishing the season as top scorer with 13 goals and registering 13 assists, also winning a number of the club's Player of the Year Awards. Linton left Clyde in June 2017, after two seasons with the side.

=== East Fife ===
After leaving Clyde, Linton signed for Scottish League One club East Fife for the 2017–18 season. He was released in May 2019 having made 44 appearances for the club, scoring four times.

=== Kelty Hearts ===
Linton signed for Kelty Hearts for the 2019–20 season and was a major contributor to the club being declared Lowland League champions with 18 goals and 18 assists from 32 appearances in all competitions. Linton decided to announce his retirement in July 2020.

== Career statistics ==
As of match played 12 March 2019

Appearances and goals by club, season and competition
Club	Season	League			Scottish Cup		League Cup		Other		Total	
Club	Season	Division	Apps	Goals	Apps	Goals	Apps	Goals	Apps	Goals	Apps	Goals
Cowdenbeath	2007–08	Scottish Second Division	6	0	0	0	0	0	2 (Note: Appearances in the Second Division play-offs)	0	8	0
Cowdenbeath	2008–09	Scottish Third Division	9	0	0	0	0	0	4 (Note: One appearance in the Scottish Challenge Cup and three in the Second Division play-offs)	0	13	0
Cowdenbeath	2009–10	Scottish Second Division	26	1	2	0	1	0	4 (Note: Two appearances in the Scottish Challenge Cup and two in the First Division play-offs)	0	33	1
Cowdenbeath	2010–11	Scottish First Division	33	2	1	0	1	0	4 (Note: Two appearances in the Scottish Challenge Cup; two appearances and a goal in the First Division play-offs)	1	39	3
Cowdenbeath	2011–12	Scottish Second Division	33	4	2	1	1	0	1 (Note: Appearances in the Scottish Challenge Cup)	0	37	5
Cowdenbeath	2012–13	Scottish First Division	25	3	0	0	1	0	4	0	30	3
Cowdenbeath	Total		132	10	5	1	4	0	19	1	160	12
Dumbarton	2013–14	Championship	29	0	4	1	1	0	1	0	35	1
Dumbarton	2014–15	Championship	28	0	1	0	2	0	1	0	32	0
Dumbarton	Total		57	0	5	1	3	0	2	0	67	1
Clyde	2015–16	League Two	35	9	1	0	1	0	5 (Note: One appearance in the Scottish Challenge Cup; four appearances and three goals in the League One play-offs)	3	42	12
Clyde	2016–17	League Two	23	1	3	0	4	0	0	0	30	1
Clyde	Total		58	10	4	0	5	0	5	3	72	13
East Fife	2017–18	League One	26	3	0	0	1	0	1	0	28	3
East Fife	2018–19	League One	12	1	3	0	0	0	1	0	16	1
East Fife	Total		38	4	3	0	1	0	2	0	44	4
Career total			285	24	17	2	13	0	28	4	343	30

== Honours ==
Kelty Hearts

- Lowland League: 2019–20
