= Manu García (footballer, born 1991) =

Spanish footballer

Personal information
- Full name: Manuel García Humanes
- Date of birth: 11 February 1991 (age 35)
- Place of birth: Pedrera, Spain
- Height: 1.92 m (6 ft 4 in)
- Position: Goalkeeper

Team information
- Current team: Marbella
- Number: 1

Youth career
- Pedrera
- 2008–2009: Écija
- 2009–2010: Marinaleda

Senior career*
Years	Team	Apps	(Gls)
2009–2010	Marinaleda	1	(0)
2010–2011	Montilla		
2011–2013	Pedrera		
2013–2014	Atarfe Industrial	27	(0)
2014–2015	Maracena	30	(0)
2015–2017	El Ejido	63	(0)
2017–2019	Extremadura	43	(0)
2019	→ Ponferradina (loan)	13	(0)
2019–2021	Ponferradina	16	(0)
2021–2023	Gimnàstic	70	(0)
2023–2024	Real Murcia	30	(0)
2024–2025	Alcoyano	16	(0)
2025–	Marbella	29	(0)
- * Club domestic league appearances and goals as of 10 June 2026

Manuel "Manu" García Humanes (born 11 February 1991) is a Spanish footballer who plays as a goalkeeper for Primera Federación club Marbella.

== Club career ==
Born in Pedrera, Seville, Andalusia, García represented CD Pedrera, Écija Balompié and UD Marinaleda as a youth. He made his senior debut with the latter team on 27 September 2009, coming on as a second-half substitute in a 7–1 Tercera División home routing of Recreativo de Huelva B.

In 2013 García joined Atarfe Industrial CF in the fourth division, after spells at Montilla CF and CD Pedrera in the regional leagues. He subsequently represented UD Maracena and CD El Ejido, achieving promotion to Segunda División B with the latter in 2016.

On 7 June 2017, García signed for fellow third division side Extremadura UD. He was an undisputed starter during the campaign, contributing with 36 league appearances as his side achieved a first-ever promotion to Segunda División.

García made his professional debut on 19 August 2018, starting in a 1–1 away draw against Real Oviedo. After starting the first matches of the campaign, he was overtaken by Álvaro Fernández and was subsequently loaned to SD Ponferradina in the third division on 28 December.

On 30 July 2019, after being a starter as Ponfe achieved promotion to division two, García signed a permanent contract with the club. He was one of the three goalkeepers used during the 2019–20 season, along with José Antonio Caro and René Román, and was a backup to Caro in 2020–21.

On 21 June 2021, García moved to Primera División RFEF side Gimnàstic de Tarragona on a one-year deal.
