= Greg Stewart (footballer) =

Scottish footballer (born 1990)

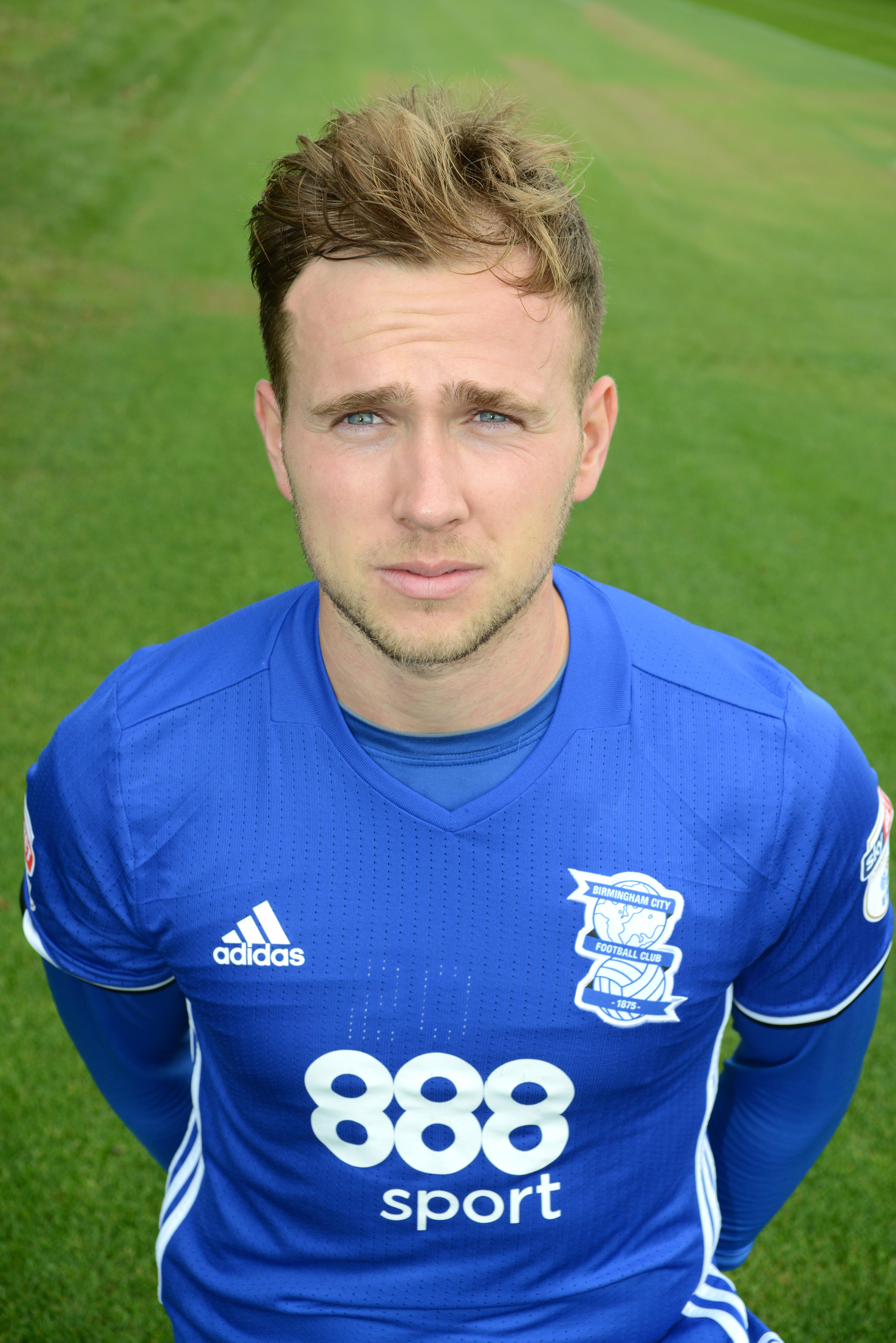
- Stewart with Birmingham City in 2016

Personal information
- Full name: Greg Alexander James Stewart
- Date of birth: 17 March 1990 (age 36)
- Place of birth: Stirling, Scotland
- Height: 5 ft 10 in (1.78 m)
- Positions: Forward; attacking midfielder

Team information
- Current team: Cove Rangers (assistant)

Youth career
- Rangers
- 2003–2006: Hearts

Senior career*
Years	Team	Apps	(Gls)
2007–2010	Syngenta Amateurs		
2010–2014	Cowdenbeath	119	(31)
2014–2016	Dundee	71	(22)
2016–2019	Birmingham City	21	(0)
2017–2018	→ Aberdeen (loan)	30	(3)
2018–2019	→ Kilmarnock (loan)	16	(8)
2019	→ Aberdeen (loan)	15	(1)
2019–2021	Rangers	21	(3)
2021–2022	Jamshedpur	21	(11)
2022–2024	Mumbai City	29	(10)
2024	Kilmarnock	8	(0)
2024–2025	Mohun Bagan	20	(3)
2025–2026	Cove Rangers	1	(0)
Total		372	(92)
- * Club domestic league appearances and goals

Greg Alexander James Stewart (born 17 March 1990) is a Scottish former professional footballer, who played as a forward, and a coach. He is currently the assistant manager of Scottish League One club Cove Rangers.

He has previously played for Scottish clubs Cowdenbeath, Dundee, Aberdeen, Kilmarnock, Rangers and Cove Rangers, as well as for Birmingham City of the EFL Championship and Jamshedpur, Mumbai City and Mohun Bagan of the Indian Super League.

== Playing career ==
=== Early career ===
Stewart started his footballing career at Rangers' Academy and played there until he was 13. He then played in the Hearts youth system, but was released due to his height. He then trained with Falkirk and Stirling Albion for almost a year, before joining Syngenta Amateurs in 2007.

=== Cowdenbeath ===
In July 2010, Stewart signed with Cowdenbeath of the Scottish First Division. He made his league debut on 7 August, in a 2–0 home loss against Ross County. On 6 November, he scored his first professional goal. He finished the season as the club's top scorer with nine goals.

=== Dundee ===
On 7 April 2014, it was confirmed that Stewart had signed a pre-contract agreement with Dundee and would join the club upon the expiry of his Cowdenbeath contract. He scored on his debut as Dundee beat Peterhead 4–0 in the first round of the Scottish League Cup on 2 August 2014. In January 2015, he signed a new contract until 2017. Stewart was named as SPFL Player of the Month for January 2015, after scoring five goals in seven matches during the month. He was named as one of four players on the shortlist for the 2014–15 PFA Scotland Players' Player of the Year award, and was nominated for a second consecutive season in April 2016.

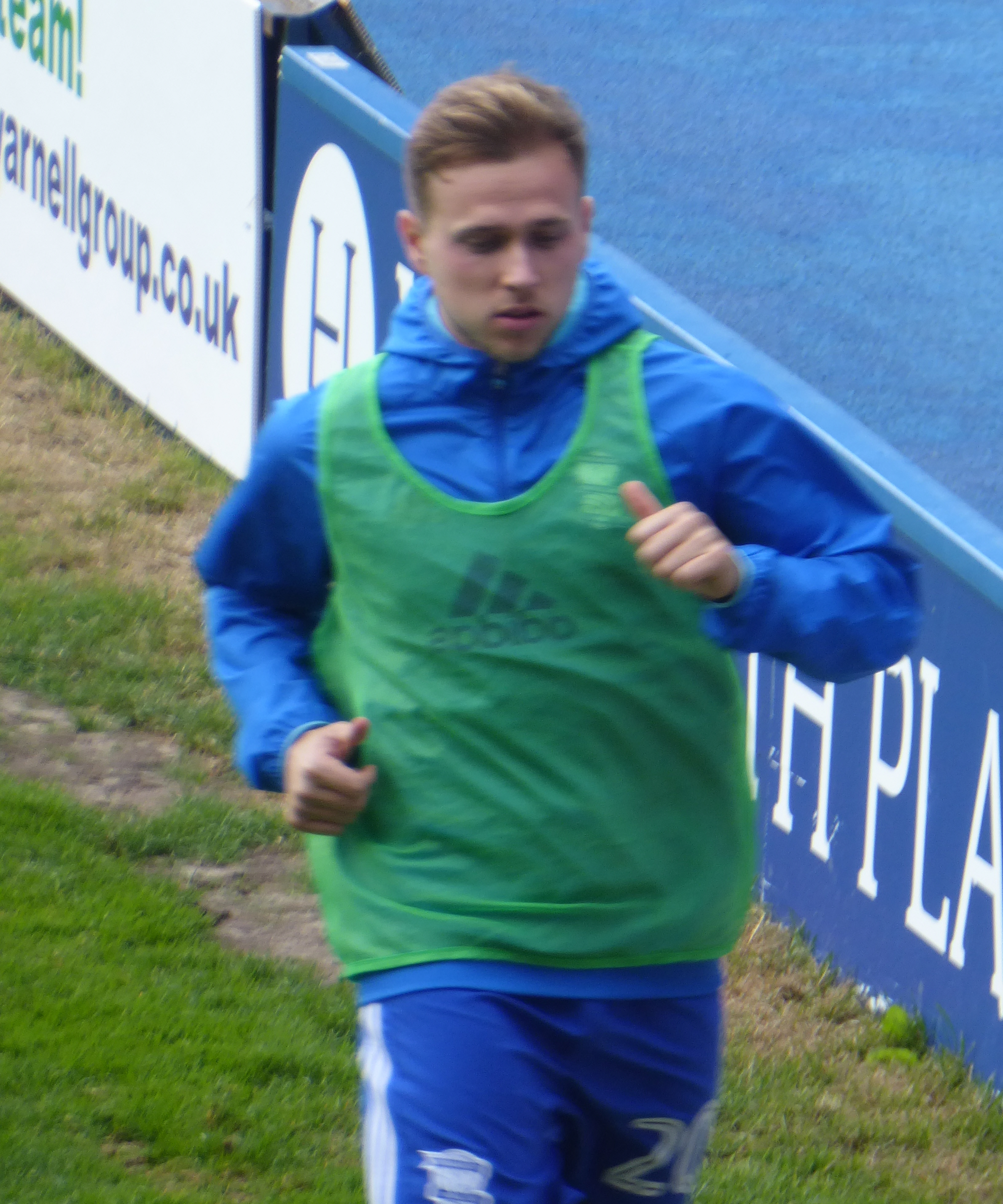
Stewart warms up before his Birmingham City home debut in August 2016

Having rejected an extension, Stewart began the last year of his Dundee contract with six goals in three League Cup matches, amid rumours linking him with a move to other SPFL clubs or to the English Championship.

=== Birmingham City ===
On 12 August 2016, Stewart signed a three-year contract with Birmingham City; the fee was officially undisclosed, but reported by the Dundee Evening Telegraph as an initial £500,000, potentially rising to more than £1 million. Stewart made his debut as a late substitute in a 1–1 draw with Wigan Athletic on 16 August, and continued off the bench until making what the Birmingham Mail dubbed a deserved first start in an unusually attacking lineup at home to Preston North End. His team came back from 2–0 down to draw, and Stewart's own performance was ineffective. He had a run of four starts in December, after Gianfranco Zola had replaced Gary Rowett as manager, but ended the season as a fringe player, with 21 league appearances, of which 6 were in the starting eleven, without scoring.

==== Loans ====
On 27 June 2017, Stewart signed for Aberdeen of the Scottish Premiership on loan for the 2017–18 season. He made 34 appearances and scored three goals in all competitions for the club. Stewart was loaned to Kilmarnock, also of the Scottish Premiership, in August 2018. He scored on his debut after "a run from half way that ended with an exquisite chip over the goalkeeper" to clinch a 2–0 win away to his former club Aberdeen, and scored again in his second match, albeit in a losing cause away to Hibernian. Stewart scored eight goals in 16 appearances for Kilmarnock in the first part of the 2018–19 season, which helped them into third place in the league.

Birmingham City opted to recall Stewart from his loan to Kilmarnock in January 2019, and then loaned him to Aberdeen again, until the end of the season. He went straight into the starting eleven for the following day's Scottish Cup match, played the whole match, and shot against the crossbar from 18 yards (16 m), as Aberdeen drew 1–1 at home to third-tier Stenhousemuir. He ended the season with two goals from 20 appearances in all competitions (one from 15 in the league).

=== Rangers ===
On 13 June 2019, Rangers announced that Stewart had joined the Scottish Premiership club on a two-year contract. Stewart was a free agent with his contract at Birmingham City allowed to expire. He made his competitive debut for Rangers on 9 July 2019 in a 4–0 win over St Joseph's of Gibraltar in the first leg of the first qualifying round of the 2019–20 UEFA Europa League.

After he won the Scottish Premiership title with the club, Rangers officially announced Stewart's departure in June 2021 and thanked him for his contributions.

=== Jamshedpur ===
On 12 September 2021, Indian Super League club Jamshedpur announced that Stewart had joined the team on a one-year deal.

On 14 December, Stewart scored a hat-trick against Odisha FC in their 4–0 win. Later on 26 December, he scored a "stunning" long-range, bending free kick in a 1–1 draw against Kerala Blasters. He finished the season with ten goals and ten assists, and was named Indian Super League Hero of the League for 2021–22 season.

=== Mumbai City ===
In July 2022, Indian Super League club Mumbai City announced the arrival of Stewart on a two-year deal. On 18 August, he scored a penalty on his debut for the club against Indian Navy in the Durand Cup, which ended in a 4–1 win. Stewart scored a hat-trick in the Durand Cup quarter-finals against Chennaiyin. He also featured in group stage games of the club in 2023–24 AFC Champions League. On 10 January 2024, Mumbai City announced that they and Stewart had agreed to mutually part ways.

=== Kilmarnock return ===
On 18 January 2024, Stewart returned to Scotland and signed with former club Kilmarnock, playing under Derek McInnes, his former manager at Aberdeen.

=== Mohun Bagan Super Giant ===
Stewart joined another Indian Super League club, Mohun Bagan, on 19 July 2024 on a one-year contract. On 7 March 2025, Mohun Bagan lifted the ISL League Shield as regular season champions, with Stewart scoring at the end of the victory over Goa in the final game of the season. On 12 April, Stewart and Mohun Bagan won the 2025 Indian Super League final against Bengaluru, with Stewart coming on as a substitute.

=== Cove Rangers ===
After his release from Mohun Bagan, Stewart remained a free agent until late-November 2025. On 29 November, Scottish League One club Cove Rangers announced his signing on a short-team contract valid until January 2026.

== Coaching career ==
=== Cove Rangers (coaching spell) ===
After retiring in 2026, in August 2026 Stewart returned to Cove Rangers as the new assistant manager under Stewart's former manager Paul Hartley.

== Career statistics ==
As of match played 20 December 2025

Appearances and goals by club, season and competition
Club	Season	League			National cup (Note: Includes Scottish Cup, FA Cup)		League cup (Note: Includes Scottish League Cup, EFL Cup, Durand Cup)		Continental		Other		Total	
Club	Season	Division	Apps	Goals	Apps	Goals	Apps	Goals	Apps	Goals	Apps	Goals	Apps	Goals
Cowdenbeath	2010–11	Scottish First Division	32	9	1	0	1	0	—		4 (Note: Two appearances in Scottish Challenge Cup, two in Scottish First Division play-offs)	0	38	9
Cowdenbeath	2011–12	Scottish Second Division	29	6	2	1	1	0	—		1 (Note: Appearance(s) in Scottish Challenge Cup)	0	33	7
Cowdenbeath	2012–13	Scottish First Division	25	5	1	3	0	0	—		3	0	29	8
Cowdenbeath	2013–14	Scottish Championship	33	11	1	0	2	1	—		5 (Note: One appearance in Scottish Challenge Cup, four appearances and four goals in Scottish Championship play-offs)	4	41	16
Cowdenbeath	Total		119	31	5	4	4	1	—		13	4	141	40
Dundee	2014–15	Scottish Premiership	34	13	2	0	3	2	—		—		39	15
Dundee	2015–16	Scottish Premiership	37	9	4	2	1	0	—		—		42	11
Dundee	2016–17	Scottish Premiership	0	0	—		3	6	—		—		3	6
Dundee	Total		71	22	6	2	7	8	—		—		84	32
Birmingham City	2016–17	Championship	21	0	1	0	—		—		—		22	0
Birmingham City	2018–19	Championship	0	0	—		0	0	—		—		0	0
Birmingham City	Total		21	0	1	0	0	0	—		—		22	0
Aberdeen (loan)	2017–18	Scottish Premiership	30	3	3	0	1	0	4 (Note: Appearance(s) in UEFA Europa League)	1	—		38	4
Kilmarnock (loan)	2018–19	Scottish Premiership	16	8	0	0	—		—		—		16	8
Aberdeen (loan)	2018–19	Scottish Premiership	15	1	5	1	—		—		—		20	2
Rangers	2019–20	Scottish Premiership	16	3	2	0	1	0	6	0	—		25	3
Rangers	2020–21	Scottish Premiership	5	0	1	0	1	0	1	0	—		8	0
Rangers	Total		21	3	3	0	2	0	7	0	—		33	3
Jamshedpur	2021–22	Indian Super League	19	11	—		—		—		2 (Note: Appearances in Indian Super League playoffs)	0	21	11
Mumbai City	2022–23	Indian Super League	18	7 (Note: Mumbai City's third goal against NorthEast United on 19 January 2023, attributed by Soccerway to Stewart, was officially recorded as an own goal.)	0	0	7	6	—		3 (Note: Two appearances in Indian Super League playoffs, one in playoff for 2023–24 AFC Champions League group stage)	0	28	13
Mumbai City	2023–24	Indian Super League	9	2	0	0	4	1	5 (Note: Appearances in AFC Champions League)	0	—		18	3
Mumbai City	Total		27	9	0	0	11	7	5	0	3	0	46	16
Kilmarnock	2023–24	Scottish Premiership	8	0	3	0	—		—		—		11	0
Mohun Bagan	2024–25	Indian Super League	18	3	0	0	4	1	1 (Note: Appearance in AFC Champions League Two)	0	2	0	25	4
Cove Rangers	2025–26	Scottish League One	1	0	1	0	—		—		—		2	0
Career total			366	90	27	7	29	17	17	1	20	4	459	119

== Honours ==
Rangers

- Scottish Premiership: 2020–21

Jamshedpur

- Indian Super League Shield: 2021–22

Mumbai City

- Indian Super League Shield: 2022–23
- Durand Cup runner-up: 2022

Mohun Bagan

- Indian Super League Shield: 2024–25
- ISL Cup: 2024–25
- Durand Cup runner-up: 2024

Individual

- Indian Super League: Golden Ball For Player of the season: 2021–22
- Indian Super League Hero of the Month: December 2021, February 2022
- Durand Cup Golden Ball: 2022
- FPAI Foreign Player of the Year: 2023
