= Kyle Miller (footballer) =

Scottish footballer

Personal information
- Date of birth: 8 August 1992 (age 34)
- Position: Midfielder

Team information
- Current team: Cowdenbeath

Senior career*
Years	Team	Apps	(Gls)
2010–	Cowdenbeath	275	(15)
- * Club domestic league appearances and goals as of 17:16, 28 December 2022 (UTC)

Kyle Miller (born 8 August 1992) is a Scottish footballer who plays for Cowdenbeath, as a midfielder.

== Career statistics ==
As of match played 4 May 2021

Appearances and goals by club, season and competition
Club	Season	League			Scottish Cup		League Cup		Other		Total	
Club	Season	Division	Apps	Goals	Apps	Goals	Apps	Goals	Apps	Goals	Apps	Goals
Cowdenbeath	2010–11	First Division	9	1	0	0	0	0	0	0	9	1
Cowdenbeath	2011–12	Second Division	5	0	0	0	0	0	1 (Note: Appearances in the Scottish Challenge Cup)	0	6	0
Cowdenbeath	2012–13	First Division	27	4	1	0	1	0	2	1	31	5
Cowdenbeath	2013–14	Championship	24	3	1	0	2	1	2 (Note: One appearance in the Scottish Challenge Cup and one in the Championship play-offs)	0	29	4
Cowdenbeath	2014–15	Championship	25	0	2	0	2	1	1	0	30	1
Cowdenbeath	2015–16	League One	19	1	2	0	0	0	2 (Note: One appearance in the Scottish Challenge Cup and one in the League One play-offs)	0	23	1
Cowdenbeath	2016–17	League Two	31	2	1	0	4	0	3 (Note: One appearance in the Scottish Challenge Cup, two in the League Two play-offs)	0	39	2
Cowdenbeath	2017–18	League Two	32	1	1	0	3	0	1	0	37	1
Cowdenbeath	2018–19	League Two	31	1	3	0	3	0	1	0	38	1
Cowdenbeath	2019–20	League Two	23	0	2	0	4	0	1	0	30	0
Cowdenbeath	2020–21	League Two	21	2	1	0	4	0	0	0	26	2
Career total			247	15	14	0	23	2	14	1	298	18
