= Pablo Navas =

Spanish footballer

Personal information
- Full name: Pablo Navas Alors
- Date of birth: 4 February 1992 (age 34)
- Place of birth: La Carlota, Spain
- Height: 1.74 m (5 ft 9 in)
- Position: Winger

Youth career
- 2002–2004: Séneca
- 2004–2006: Córdoba
- 2006–2008: Barcelona
- 2008–2010: Portsmouth
- 2010–2011: Atlético Madrid

Senior career*
Years	Team	Apps	(Gls)
2011–2012	Marinaleda	13	(0)
2012–2013	Cowdenbeath	3	(0)
2014	Alcoyano	4	(0)
2014–2015	Lucena	3	(0)
2015	Quintanar Rey	12	(1)
2016	Rayo Cantabria	1	(0)
2016	Torrevieja	6	(0)
2017	Palencia	9	(0)
2017	FK Utenis	14	(0)
2018–2019	Ordino	13	(1)
2020	Sant Julià	2	(0)
2020	Gavà		
- * Club domestic league appearances and goals as of 21:05, 15 November 2020 (UTC)

Pablo Navas Alors (born 4 February 1992) is a Spanish footballer who plays as a winger.

== Football career ==
Born in La Carlota, Córdoba, Navas joined local Séneca CF's youth system in 2002, aged 10. Four years later he moved to La Liga giants FC Barcelona, after a short spell at Córdoba CF.

In July 2008 Navas joined Premier League side Portsmouth FC in a free transfer. He was released in April 2010, after failing to make a first-team appearance for Pompey.

In the 2010 summer Navas returned to his home country, signing with Atlético Madrid and being assigned to the Juvenil squad; a season later he moved to UD Marinaleda in Tercera División, making his senior debuts with the Andalusians during the season.

On 24 August 2012 Navas moved teams and countries again, joining Scottish Championship side Cowdenbeath FC. He played his first match as a professional on 17 November, coming on as a substitute in a 1–1 home draw against Airdrie United FC. He suffered an injury in March 2013, and left the club in May, after appearing in three games, all from the bench.

In January 2014, after nearly six months without action, Navas moved back to Spain, signing with CD Alcoyano in Segunda División B. He was released in May, after appearing in only four matches, and signed for fellow league team Lucena CF on 21 November.

On 3 September 2015 Navas joined CD Quintanar del Rey in the fourth level.
