= Lee Wilson (footballer, born 1993) =

Scottish footballer

Personal information
- Full name: Lee Wilson
- Date of birth: 21 August 1993 (age 33)
- Place of birth: Kirkcaldy, Scotland
- Position: Goalkeeper

Team information
- Current team: Hill of Beath Hawthorn

Youth career
- –2007: Blue Brazil B.C.
- 2007–2010: Cowdenbeath

Senior career*
Years	Team	Apps	(Gls)
2010–2013	Cowdenbeath	2	(0)
2013–2014	Dundonald Bluebell		
2014–2017	Lochgelly Albert		
2017–2019	St. Andrews United		
2019–2021	Linlithgow Rose		
2021–	Hill of Beath Hawthorn		
- * Club domestic league appearances and goals as of 16:00, 2 August 2020 (UTC)

Lee Wilson (born 21 August 1993) is a Scottish footballer who plays for Hill of Beath Hawthorn.

== Career ==
Wilson was born in Kirkcaldy, Fife, and started his career with Blue Brazil Boys Club. He joined Cowdenbeath in February 2007, at age of thirteen and spent the next three-and-a-half-years playing for the under-age sides. He made his senior debut on 23 October 2010 against Greenock Morton as a substitute following David Hay's dismissal. His first task was to face a Peter Weatherson spot kick which hit the inside of the post and ran along the goal line before being cleared by Scott Linton. The match ended in 2–2 draw with Wilson having made numerous saves including a penalty from Brian Graham. He signed a new contract in advance of 2011–12 season following the appoint of Colin Cameron as manager.

Wilson left Cowdenbeath in 2013 and had stints at several Fife clubs, including Dundonald Bluebell, Lochgelly Albert and St. Andrews United, before signing for Linlithgow Rose in 2019.

== Career statistics ==
As of 10 November 2012.

Appearances and goals by club, season and competition
Club	Season	League		Cup		League Cup		Other^{[a]}		Total	
Club	Season	Apps	Goals	Apps	Goals	Apps	Goals	Apps	Goals	Apps	Goals
Cowdenbeath	2010–11	1	0	0	0	0	0	0	0	1	0
Cowdenbeath	2011–12	1	0	0	0	0	0	0	0	1	0
Cowdenbeath	2012–13	0	0	0	0	0	0	0	0	0	0
Career total		2	0	0	0	0	0	0	0	2	0

a. Includes other competitive competitions, including the Scottish Challenge Cup.
