= Kenny Adamson =

Scottish footballer

Personal information
- Date of birth: 21 August 1988 (age 38)
- Place of birth: Dunfermline, Scotland
- Position: Defender

Team information
- Current team: Kelty Hearts

Senior career*
Years	Team	Apps	(Gls)
2007	Livingston	3	(0)
2007–2017	Cowdenbeath	233	(4)
2017–	Kelty Hearts		
- * Club domestic league appearances and goals as of 09:55, 2 June 2017 (UTC)

Kenny Adamson (born 21 August 1988) is a Scottish professional footballer who plays as a defender for Kelty Hearts. Adamson has previously played for Livingston, as well as having a ten-year spell with Cowdenbeath.

== Career ==
=== Livingston ===
A member of Livingston's under 19 squad, Adamson made his first team debut as a substitute on 14 April 2007, in a 1–1 draw with Queen of the South in the Scottish First Division. In all he made 3 appearances in his debut season.

=== Cowdenbeath ===
In May 2007, Adamson signed for Scottish Second Division side Cowdenbeath. He made his debut on 4 August 2007, in a 1–1 draw with Berwick Rangers. In all he made 36 Appearances in his debut season. He scored his first goal for the club the following season on 20 December 2008, in a 4–1 win over East Stirlingshire.

He was sent off for the first time in his career on 8 August 2009, in a 2–1 defeat to Arbroath. In all he was dismissed three times that season as they won promotion to the Scottish First Division.

On 13 March 2012, Adamson signed a new contract extending his stay until May 2013. Adamson was part of the Cowdenbeath side which suffered back-to-back relegation from the Scottish Championship to Scottish League Two. Due to injury, Adamson missed all of the 2016–17 season with his final match for the club coming in the Scottish League One semi-final against Queen's Park on 7 May 2016.

=== Kelty Hearts ===
Adamson signed for Kelty Hearts on 1 June 2017, dropping down to the SJFA East Superleague.

== Career statistics ==
As of 20 March 2012

Club statistics
Club	Season	Division	League		Scottish Cup		League Cup		Other		Total	
Club	Season	Division	App	Goals	App	Goals	App	Goals	App	Goals	App	Goals
Livingston	2006–07	SFL1	3	0	0	0	0	0	0	0	3	0
Cowdenbeath	2007–08	SFL2	29	0	2	0	2	0	3	0	36	0
Cowdenbeath	2008–09	SFL3	25	2	0	0	1	0	1	0	27	2
Cowdenbeath	2009–10	SFL2	25	0	2	0	1	0	5	0	33	0
Cowdenbeath	2010–11	SFL1	26	0	0	0	1	0	3	0	30	0
Cowdenbeath	2011–12	SFL2	27	1	2	0	1	0	1	0	31	1
Total			135	3	6	0	6	0	13	0	160	3
