= Rubén García (footballer, born 1986) =

Spanish footballer

Personal information
- Full name: Rubén García Rey
- Date of birth: 16 January 1986 (age 40)
- Place of birth: Málaga, Spain
- Height: 1.81 m (5 ft 11 in)
- Position: Right-back

Youth career
- Real Madrid

Senior career*
Years	Team	Apps	(Gls)
2006–2007	Fuengirola		
2007–2008	Valladolid B	21	(0)
2008–2010	Lucena	25	(1)
2010–2011	Alhaurino	21	(2)
2011–2012	Juventud Torremolinos	21	(0)
2012	Cowdenbeath	3	(0)
2013–2019	Juventud Torremolinos	149	(13)
Total		240	(16)

International career
2004	Spain U19	1	(0)
- * Club domestic league appearances and goals

Rubén García Rey (born 16 January 1986) is a Spanish former professional footballer who played as a right-back.

== Club career ==
Born in Málaga, Andalusia, García only played lower league football in his country. From 2007 to 2010 he competed in the Segunda División B in representation of Real Valladolid Promesas and Lucena CF, making no league appearances for the latter club in the last season.

In the summer of 2012, after spending one year with CD Alhaurino of Tercera División and another with Juventud de Torremolinos CF in the regional championships, García signed for Scottish First Division side Cowdenbeath after his agent sent YouTube videos to manager Colin Cameron, and the player impressed in a subsequent trial. Released after only a few months, he returned to Spanish amateur football.
