= Marc McKenzie =

Scottish footballer

Personal information
- Date of birth: 11 July 1985 (age 41)
- Place of birth: Glasgow, Scotland
- Position: Winger

Team information
- Current team: Camelon Juniors

Senior career*
Years	Team	Apps	(Gls)
2003–2005	Albion Rovers	44	(1)
2005	Stenhousemuir	6	(0)
2005–2010	East Stirlingshire	119	(8)
2010–2014	Cowdenbeath	113	(26)
2014	→ East Fife (loan)	12	(1)
2014–2015	Albion Rovers	32	(6)
2015–2016	Elgin City	30	(1)
2016–2017	Stirling Albion	16	(4)
2017	Clyde	11	(0)
2017–2018	Arthurlie	?	(?)
2018	Kilwinning Rangers	?	(?)
2018–2020	Hurlford United	?	(?)
2019	→ Rossvale (loan)	?	(?)
2020	Forfar Athletic	1	(0)
2021–2023	Hurlford United	0	(0)
2023–2024	Pollok	15	(3)
2024–	Camelon Juniors	?	(?)
- * Club domestic league appearances and goals

Marc McKenzie (born 11 July 1985) is a Scottish footballer who plays for Camelon Juniors.

McKenzie has previously played for Stenhousemuir, East Stirlingshire, Cowdenbeath, East Fife, Elgin City, Stirling Albion, Clyde and twice for Albion Rovers then onto Hurlford United twice, Forfar Athletic, and Rossvale on loan.

== Career ==
=== Albion Rovers ===
McKenzie's first professional contract was with Albion Rovers after coming up through the youth academies of Raith Rovers and Livingston. He signed professionally for them on 26 April 2003, making his debut as a substitute the same day, aged 17, taking part in the 2–1 win over Stirling Albion. The following season, he featured more regularly making 11 appearances. He scored his first goal for the club on 17 August 2004, scoring the winning goal in a 2–1 over Queen of the South in the Scottish League Cup.

=== Stenhousemuir ===
On 31 May 2005, McKenzie signed for fellow Scottish Third Division side Stenhousemuir. He made his debut on 30 July 2005, in a 4–0 win over East Fife in the Scottish Challenge Cup with his league debut coming on 6 August against Queen's Park. He spent only half a season at the club, making only 8 appearances (5 as sub) scoring no goals.

=== East Stirlingshire ===
On 1 March 2006, McKenzie signed for East Stirlingshire. He made his debut on 11 March 2006, in a 2–0 defeat to Montrose, going on to make 10 appearances in his debut season. He scored his first goals for the club on 26 August 2006, netting a hat trick against former club Stenhousemuir. Over the course of 5 seasons he made 144 appearances scoring 8 times.

=== Cowdenbeath ===
McKenzie signed for Scottish First Division side Cowdenbeath in the summer of 2010, on a one-year deal. He made his debut on 24 July in the Challenge Cup, with his league debut coming on 7 August in a 2–0 defeat to Ross County. He scored his first goal for the club on 22 August, hitting the net from 25 yards, in a 3–1 defeat to Queen of the South. In all he made 35 appearances in his debut season, scoring twice.

Following the club's relegation to the Second Division, he signed an extended contract for the new season. He won promotion back to the First Division at the first attempt in the 2011–12 season. On 23 January 2014, McKenzie signed for East Fife on a contract until the end of the season.

=== Albion Rovers return ===
In June 2015, after 18 months with The Wee Rovers,

=== Elgin City ===
McKenzie signed for Elgin City on a one-year contract.

=== Stirling Albion ===
After one season, McKenzie signed for Scottish League Two rivals Stirling Albion in May 2016, however, he left the club in January 2017 after the club agreed to terminate his contract.

=== Clyde ===
On 13 January 2017, McKenzie signed for fellow Scottish League Two side Clyde until the end of the 2016–17 season. He was released by the club in June 2017 following the end of his contract.

=== Arthurlie ===
On 23 June 2017, McKenzie signed for Junior club Arthurlie, where he stayed for one season before moving to Kilwinning Rangers in June 2018.

=== Hurlford United ===
McKenzie joined fellow SJFA West Region Premiership side Hurlford United in December 2018.

=== Forfar Athletic ===
McKenzie signed for Scottish League One side Forfar Athletic on 1 February 2020. He only played one league game for "The Loons" before departing.

=== Hurlford United ===
McKenzie rejoined Hurlford in 2021, and remained until 2023, winning the inaugural West of Scotland Football League Cup with them in 2022.

=== Pollok ===
McKenzie signed for Pollok ahead of the 2022–23 season, and scored his first goal against Irvine Meadow in August.

== Career statistics ==
As of 24 March 2012

Club statistics
Club	Season	League		Scottish Cup		League Cup		Other		Total	
Club	Season	App	Goals	App	Goals	App	Goals	App	Goals	App	Goals
Albion Rovers	2002–03	1	0	0	0	0	0	0	0	1	0
Albion Rovers	2003–04	11	0	0	0	0	0	0	0	11	0
Albion Rovers	2004–05	32	1	1	0	3	1	2	0	38	2
Stenhousemuir	2005–06	6	0	0	0	1	0	1	0	8	0
East Stirlingshire	2005–06	10	0	0	0	0	0	0	0	10	0
East Stirlingshire	2006–07	31	5	1	0	1	0	1	0	34	5
East Stirlingshire	2007–08	26	1	2	0	1	0	0	0	29	1
East Stirlingshire	2008–09	33	2	2	0	1	0	4	0	40	2
East Stirlingshire	2009–10	29	0	0	0	1	0	2	0	32	0
Cowdenbeath	2010–11	30	2	1	0	1	0	3	0	35	2
Cowdenbeath	2011–12	30	12	2	0	1	0	0	0	33	12
Total		239	23	9	0	10	1	13	0	271	24
