= George Salmond =

Scottish cricketer (born 1969)

Personal information
- Born: 1 December 1969 (age 56); Dundee, Scotland
- Batting: Right-handed
- Bowling: Right-arm medium

International information
- National side: Scotland (1999)
- ODI debut: 16 May 1999 v Australia
- Last ODI: 31 May 1999 v New Zealand

Career statistics
Competition	ODI	FC	LA
Matches	5	12	38
Runs scored	57	888	543
Batting average	11.40	46.73	15.93
100s/50s	0/0	2/3	0/3
Top score	31	181	70
Catches/stumpings	1/–	8/–	13/–
- Source: CricketArchive, 2 April 2020

George Salmond (born 1 December 1969) is a former Scottish cricketer, with 146 full caps (104 as captain) later became a football referee.

During a distinguished cricketing career, Salmond captained Scotland in Under-16, Under-19 B and senior levels.

A right-handed batsman and a right-arm medium-fast bowler, Salmond's top-score was 181 in a 1996 three-day match against Ireland, smashing his previous two records from the corresponding fixture in 1992, in a match where he only narrowly missed getting two centuries in a single game. He played List A cricket as well as performing in the ICC Trophy between 1997 and 2001.

Salmond is now head of the Junior School at George Watson's College, Edinburgh. Since his retirement from cricket, he has become a football referee.
