= 2009–10 Scottish Second Division =

Scottish Second Division
- Season: 2009–10
- Champions: Stirling Albion
- Promoted: Stirling Albion; Cowdenbeath
- Relegated: Arbroath; Clyde
- Top goalscorer: Rory McAllister (21)

The 2009–10 Scottish Second Division was the sixteenth season of the Second Division in its current format of ten teams.

== Promotion and relegation from 2008–09 ==
Location of teams in Scottish Second Division 2009–10

=== First & Second Divisions ===
Relegated from First Division to Second Division

- Clyde

Promoted from Second Division to First Division

- Raith Rovers
- Ayr United

=== Second & Third Divisions ===
Relegated from Second Division to Third Division

- Queen's Park
- Stranraer

Promoted from Third Division to Second Division

- Dumbarton
- Stenhousemuir
- Cowdenbeath

== League table ==
Pos	Team	Pld	W	D	L	GF	GA	GD	Pts	Promotion, qualification or relegation
1	Stirling Albion (C, P)	36	18	11	7	68	48	+20	65	Promotion to the First Division
2	Alloa Athletic	36	19	8	9	49	35	+14	65	Qualification for the First Division play-offs (Note: The 2nd, 3rd and 4th placed teams will be entered into a play-off with the First Division's 9th placed team. The winning team will be awarded a place in the 2010–11 First Division.)
3	Cowdenbeath (O, P)	36	16	11	9	60	41	+19	59	Qualification for the First Division play-offs
4	Brechin City	36	15	9	12	47	42	+5	54	Qualification for the First Division play-offs
5	Peterhead	36	15	6	15	45	49	−4	51	
6	Dumbarton	36	14	6	16	49	58	−9	48	
7	East Fife	36	10	11	15	46	53	−7	41	
8	Stenhousemuir	36	9	13	14	38	42	−4	40	
9	Arbroath (R)	36	10	10	16	41	55	−14	40	Qualification for the Second Division play-offs (Note: The 9th place team will be entered into a play-off with the 2nd, 3rd and 4th places of the Third Division. The winner gets a place in the 2010-11 Second Division)
10	Clyde (R)	36	8	7	21	37	57	−20	31	Relegation to the Third Division

Source: Scottish Football League
Rules for classification: 1) points; 2) goal difference; 3) number of goals scored.
(C) Champions; (O) Play-off winners; (P) Promoted; (R) Relegated

== Results ==
Each team plays every other team four times during the season, twice at home and twice away, for a total of 36 matches.

=== First half of season ===
Home \ Away	ALO	ARB	BRE	CLY	COW	DUM	EFI	PET	STE	STI
Alloa Athletic		0–1	2–1	2–0	2–1	1–3	0–0	1–0	1–4	1–0
Arbroath	2–2		1–4	0–3	0–1	3–1	0–1	0–1	0–3	3–4
Brechin City	2–1	0–0		2–2	3–1	3–1	3–2	3–0	1–0	1–0
Clyde	0–1	1–0	1–0		0–1	0–2	1–3	1–3	2–1	0–1
Cowdenbeath	1–1	1–2	0–0	1–0		2–1	2–1	5–0	2–1	1–2
Dumbarton	1–3	1–0	0–0	3–3	0–3		0–3	1–0	0–0	2–3
East Fife	0–2	1–1	2–0	1–0	1–1	0–1		1–2	2–1	1–2
Peterhead	0–0	1–2	1–0	2–0	0–2	1–2	1–1		2–2	3–2
Stenhousemuir	1–0	3–0	1–1	1–0	0–2	0–3	1–1	2–0		1–2
Stirling Albion	0–1	2–2	1–0	1–1	2–2	2–2	3–0	2–1	0–0	

Updated to match(es) played on 9 February 2010. Source: Scottish Football League
Legend: Blue = home team win; Yellow = draw; Red = away team win.

=== Second half of the season ===
Home \ Away	ALO	ARB	BRE	CLY	COW	DUM	EFI	PET	STE	STI
Alloa Athletic		1–0	2–3	2–2	3–1	1–2	2–0	2–1	2–1	2–1
Arbroath	0–0		1–0	2–0	1–1	3–1	2–2	1–4	1–1	2–4
Brechin City	1–1	0–2		3–1	3–3	0–1	1–0	1–2	2–2	1–1
Clyde	0–2	0–2	0–3		1–2	4–2	2–1	3–1	0–2	1–2
Cowdenbeath	1–1	2–1	4–0	3–1		0–0	6–2	1–3	1–0	3–3
Dumbarton	3–1	0–2	0–1	3–3	2–1		0–1	1–2	2–1	2–4
East Fife	0–1	3–1	2–0	1–1	2–2	2–3		3–0	1–1	0–3
Peterhead	2–0	3–0	0–3	0–0	1–0	2–1	3–1		0–1	1–1
Stenhousemuir	0–2	1–1	1–2	0–3	0–0	1–0	1–1	1–1		1–3
Stirling Albion	0–3	2–2	6–2	1–0	1–0	1–2	3–3	2–0	1–1	

Updated to match(es) played on 1 May 2010. Source: Scottish Football League
Legend: Blue = home team win; Yellow = draw; Red = away team win.

== Second Division play-offs ==
Times are BST (UTC+1)

=== Semi-finals ===
The ninth placed team in the Second Division played the fourth placed team in the Third Division and third placed team in the Third Division played the second placed team in the Third Division. The play-offs were played over two legs, the winning team in each semi-final advanced to the final.

Team 1	Agg.	Team 2	1st leg	2nd leg
Queen's Park	2–6	Arbroath	0–4	2–2
East Stirlingshire	2–3	Forfar Athletic	0–1	2–2

First legs

5 May 2010
7:45pm

Queen's Park	0–4	Arbroath
	BBC Sport	Ross 24'; Redman 45'; Nimmo 53'; Moyes 68'

Hampden Park
Attendance: 651

5 May 2010
7:45pm

East Stirlingshire	0–1	Forfar Athletic
	BBC Sport	Campbell 68' (pen)

Ochilview Park
Attendance: 487

Second legs

8 May
3:00pm

Arbroath	2–2	Queen's Park
McCulloch 3'; Megginson 15'	BBC Sport	Daly 57'; Rattray 82' (o.g)

Gayfield Park
Attendance: 588

8 May
3:00pm

Forfar Athletic	2–2	East Stirlingshire
Bishop 4'; Tulloch 82'	BBC Sport	Andy Rodgers 49', 76'

Station Park, Forfar
Attendance: 745

=== Final ===
The two semi-final winners played each other over two legs. The winning team was awarded a place in the 2010–11 Second Division.

Team 1	Agg.	Team 2	1st leg	2nd leg
Arbroath	0–2	Forfar Athletic	0–0	0–2

First leg

12 May 2010
7:45pm

Arbroath	0–0	Forfar Athletic
	BBC Sport

Gayfield Park
Attendance: 1027

Second leg

16 May 2010
3:00pm

Forfar Athletic	2–0	Arbroath
Fotheringham 5'; Deasley 90+3'	BBC Sport

Station Park, Forfar
Attendance: 2207
