= 2008–09 Scottish Second Division =

Irn-Bru Scottish Second Division
- Season: 2008–09
- Champions: Raith Rovers
- Promoted: Raith Rovers, Ayr United
- Relegated: Stranraer, Queen's Park
- Top goalscorer: Kevin Smith (18)
- Biggest home win: Ayr United 5–0 Stranraer
- Biggest away win: Stranraer 2–8 Stirling Albion

The 2008–09 Scottish Second Division was the fifteenth season of the Second Division in its current format of ten teams.

== Promotion and relegation from 2007–08 ==
Location of teams in Scottish Second Division 2008–09

=== First & Second Divisions ===
Relegated from First Division to Second Division

- Stirling Albion

Promoted from Second Division to First Division

- Ross County
- Airdrie United (losing play-off finalists, promoted due to Gretna's demotion to Third Division)

=== Second & Third Divisions ===
Relegated from Second Division to Third Division

- Berwick Rangers
- Cowdenbeath (via play-offs)

Promoted from Third Division to Second Division

- East Fife
- Arbroath (via play-offs)
- Stranraer (losing play-off finalists, promoted due to Gretna's demotion to Third Division)

== League table ==
Pos	Team	Pld	W	D	L	GF	GA	GD	Pts	Promotion, qualification or relegation
1	Raith Rovers (C, P)	36	22	10	4	60	27	+33	76	Promotion to the First Division
2	Ayr United (P)	36	22	8	6	71	38	+33	74	Qualification for the First Division Play-offs (Note: The 2nd, 3rd and 4th placed teams will be entered into a play-off with the First Division's 9th placed team. The winning team will be awarded a place in the 2009–10 First Division)
3	Brechin City	36	18	8	10	51	45	+6	62	Qualification for the First Division Play-offs
4	Peterhead	36	15	11	10	54	39	+15	56	Qualification for the First Division Play-offs
5	Stirling Albion	36	14	11	11	59	49	+10	53	
6	East Fife	36	13	5	18	39	44	−5	44	
7	Arbroath	36	11	8	17	44	46	−2	41	
8	Alloa Athletic	36	11	8	17	47	59	−12	41	
9	Queen's Park (R)	36	7	12	17	35	54	−19	33	Qualification for the Second Division Play-offs (Note: The 9th placed team will be entered into a play-off with the Third Division's 2nd, 3rd and 4th placed teams. The winning team will be awarded a place in the 2009–10 Second Division.)
10	Stranraer (R)	36	3	7	26	31	90	−59	16	Relegation to the Second Third Division

Source: BBC Sport
Rules for classification: 1) points; 2) goal difference; 3) number of goals scored.
(C) Champions; (P) Promoted; (R) Relegated

== Results ==
Teams play each other four times in this league. In the first half of the season each team plays every other team twice (home and away) and then do the same in the second half of the season.

=== First half of season ===
Home \ Away	ALO	ARB	AYR	BRE	EFI	PET	QPA	RAI	STI	STR
Alloa Athletic		2–1	0–2	2–1	0–3	1–0	1–3	1–1	4–3	5–1
Arbroath	4–1		0–3	1–2	0–1	4–0	1–1	0–2	1–2	1–0
Ayr United	3–0	2–1		1–1	4–2	2–0	2–1	0–0	1–1	3–2
Brechin City	3–1	3–1	0–1		2–1	2–2	2–1	2–0	2–1	1–0
East Fife	1–0	3–2	3–0	0–0		0–2	1–2	0–2	0–1	1–2
Peterhead	1–0	1–1	3–0	5–1	0–1		4–1	1–2	1–1	4–0
Queen's Park	1–0	1–2	0–3	1–1	0–0	0–1		1–2	1–1	2–2
Raith Rovers	4–1	2–1	3–2	2–2	1–1	3–0	2–0		1–1	2–1
Stirling Albion	3–2	0–2	2–2	1–2	1–1	0–0	0–3	2–1		3–2
Stranraer	2–2	2–2	1–3	1–2	0–4	0–3	0–0	0–2	1–0	

Source: BBC Sport
Legend: Blue = home team win; Yellow = draw; Red = away team win.

=== Second half of season ===
Home \ Away	ALO	ARB	AYR	BRE	EFI	PET	QPA	RAI	STI	STR
Alloa Athletic		2–0	3–2	3–2	0–1	1–2	0–0	0–0	2–3	2–2
Arbroath	1–0		1–3	0–0	0–2	2–2	3–0	0–2	1–2	2–0
Ayr United	1–1	2–1		4–2	2–0	0–0	1–1	2–2	3–1	5–0
Brechin City	1–0	0–1	1–0		2–1	1–1	2–0	0–4	1–2	2–1
East Fife	0–2	0–0	0–1	2–1		0–3	4–2	0–1	0–3	4–0
Peterhead	2–2	1–0	2–3	0–1	2–0		1–1	2–1	1–1	1–0
Queen's Park	1–2	0–1	0–3	0–0	3–1	2–1		0–1	3–1	1–1
Raith Rovers	3–1	0–0	0–1	2–0	1–0	3–3	1–0		1–1	2–1
Stirling Albion	0–0	1–1	2–0	2–3	2–0	2–1	4–0	0–1		1–2
Stranraer	1–3	1–5	1–4	0–3	0–1	0–1	2–2	0–3	2–8	

Source: BBC Sport
Legend: Blue = home team win; Yellow = draw; Red = away team win.

== Top scorers ==
Rank	Scorer	Team	Goals
1	(Scotland) Kevin Smith	Raith Rovers	18
2	(Scotland) Bryan Prunty	Ayr United	15
3	(Scotland) David McKenna	Stirling Albion	13
4	(Scotland) Paul McManus	East Fife	12
5	(Scotland) Martin Grehan	Stirling Albion	11
6	(Scotland) Ryan Stevenson	Ayr United	10
7	(Scotland) Graham Weir	Raith Rovers	9
7	(Scotland) David Gormley	Ayr United	9
7	(Scotland) Graeme Sharp	Peterhead	9
7	(Scotland) Martin Bavidge	Peterhead	9

Source: The League Insider

== Attendances ==
Team	Stadium	Capacity	Highest	Lowest	Average
Raith Rovers	Stark's Park	10,104	4,812	1,294	2,106
Ayr United	Somerset Park	11,998	2,363	1,057	1,477
East Fife	Bayview Stadium	2,000	1,980	533	864
Queen's Park	Hampden Park	52,500	1,763	466	730
Stirling Albion	Forthbank Stadium	3,808	1,125	404	642
Arbroath	Gayfield Park	4,125	921	411	638
Alloa Athletic	Recreation Park	3,100	1,057	331	637
Peterhead	Balmoor	4,000	837	400	615
Brechin City	Glebe Park	3,960	780	315	552
Stranraer	Stair Park	5,600	891	124	303

Source:The League Insider

== Managerial changes ==
Team	Outgoing manager	Manner of departure	Date of vacancy	Replaced by	Date of appointment	Table position
Brechin City	(Northern Ireland) Michael O'Neill	Resigned	15 December 2008	(Scotland) Jim Duffy	9 January	3
Stranraer	(Scotland) Derek Ferguson	Resigned	24 January	(Scotland) Keith Knox	17 February	10
East Fife	(Scotland) Dave Baikie	Resigned	14 April	(Scotland) Stevie Crawford	14 April	6

== Monthly awards ==
Month	First Division manager		SFL Player		SFL Young player	
Month	Manager	Club	Player	Club	Player	Club
August	(Italy) Roberto Landi	Livingston	(Scotland) Stephen Robertson	Airdrie United	(Scotland) Leigh Griffiths	Livingston
September	(Scotland) Jim McIntyre	Dunfermline Athletic	(Scotland) Paul McManus	East Fife	(Scotland) Calum Elliot	Livingston
October	(Scotland) Derek McInnes	St Johnstone	(Scotland) Steven Milne	St Johnstone	(England) Dominic Shimmin	Greenock Morton
November	(Scotland) Jocky Scott	Dundee	(Scotland) Bryan Prunty	Ayr United	(Scotland) Kyle Benedictus	Dundee
December	(Scotland) John Brown	Clyde	(Scotland) Alan Main	St Johnstone	(Scotland) Chris McMenamin	Berwick Rangers
January	(Scotland) Ian McCall	Partick Thistle	(Scotland) Willie McLaren	Clyde	(Scotland) Bobby Barr	Albion Rovers
February	(Scotland) Jocky Scott	Dundee	(Scotland) Gary Harkins	Partick Thistle	(Scotland) Fraser McLaren	Berwick Rangers
March	(Scotland) Paul Hegarty	Livingston	(Scotland) Kevin Rutkiewicz	St Johnstone	(Scotland) Leigh Griffiths	Livingston
April	(Scotland) Gordon Chisholm	Queen of the South	(Scotland) Stephen Dobbie	Queen of the South	(Scotland) Kevin Moon	St Johnstone

== Second Division play-offs ==
=== Semi-finals ===
The ninth placed team in the Second Division played the fourth placed team in the Third Division and third placed team in the Second Division played the second placed team in the Second Division. The play-offs were played over two legs, the winning team in each semi-final advanced to the final.

Team 1	Agg.	Team 2	1st leg	2nd leg
East Stirlingshire	2 – 3	Cowdenbeath	1–2	1–1
Stenhousemuir	2 – 1	Queen's Park	2–1	0–0

First legs

13 May 2009
19:45

East Stirlingshire	1 – 2	Cowdenbeath
Rodgers 62'	Report	Gemmell 12'; Stein 30'

Ochilview Park, Stenhousemuir
Attendance: 605
Referee: W Collum

14 May 2009
19:45

Stenhousemuir	2 – 1	Queen's Park
Dalziel 6' (pen.); Love 32'	Report	Harkins 33'

Ochilview Park, Stenhousemuir
Attendance: 617
Referee: S Nicholls

Second legs

16 May 2008

Cowdenbeath	1 – 1	East Stirlingshire
Dempster 84'	Report	Graham 3'

Central Park, Cowdenbeath
Attendance: 633
Referee: M Tumilty

17 May 2009

Queen's Park	0 – 0	Stenhousemuir
	Report

Hampden Park, Glasgow
Attendance: 854
Referee: S Conroy

=== Final ===
The two semi-final winners played each other over two legs, the home team in the 1st Leg was determined by a draw conducted on 16 April 2008. The winning team were awarded a place in the 2008–09 Second Division.

Team 1	Agg.	Team 2	1st leg	2nd leg
Cowdenbeath	0–0 (4–5 pen.)	Stenhousemuir	0–0	0–0

First leg

20 May 2009
19:45

Cowdenbeath	0–0	Stenhousemuir
	Report

Central Park, Cowdenbeath
Attendance: 775
Referee: A Muir

Second leg

23 May 2009
15:00

Stenhousemuir	0–0 (a.e.t.)	Cowdenbeath
	Report
Penalties
	5–4

Ochilview Park, Stenhousemuir
Attendance: 1,530
Referee: S O'Reilly
