= UD Marinaleda =

Marinaleda
- Full name: Unión Deportiva Marinaleda
- Founded: 1986
- Ground: Jornalero Stadium, Marinaleda, Andalusia, Spain
- Capacity: 1,500
- Chairman: (Spain) Isaí Saavedra
- League: Tercera Andaluza Sevilla – Group 2
- 2025–26: Tercera Andaluza Sevilla – Group 2, 4th of 13
Home colours	Away colours

Unión Deportiva Marinaleda is a Spanish football team based in Marinaleda, in the autonomous community of Andalusia. Founded in 1986, it plays in Tercera Andaluza Sevilla – Group 2, holding home games at Jornalero Stadium, with a 1,500-seat capacity.

In 2012–13 season, played in Primera Andaluza until January 2013 when withdrew from competition due to being unable to raise funds for pay its players and refereeing's taxes until end of season.

In 2017–18 season, the team returns and starts in Tercera Andaluza.

== Season to season ==
Season	Tier	Division	Place	Copa del Rey
1989–90	6	1ª Reg.	7th	
1990–91	6	1ª Reg.	9th	
1991–92	6	1ª Reg.	3rd	
1992–93	6	1ª Reg.	3rd	
1993–94	6	1ª Reg.	1st	
1994–95	5	Reg. Pref.	10th	
1995–96	5	Reg. Pref.	5th	
1996–97	5	Reg. Pref.	16th	
1997–98	6	1ª Reg.	5th	
1998–99	6	1ª Reg.	6th	
1999–2000	6	1ª Reg.	5th	
2000–01	6	1ª Reg.	2nd	
2001–02	6	1ª Reg.	3rd	
2002–03	6	1ª Reg.	7th	
2003–04	6	1ª Reg.	3rd	
2004–05	6	Reg. Pref.	4th	
2005–06	6	Reg. Pref.	7th	
2006–07	6	Reg. Pref.	2nd	
2007–08	5	1ª And.	9th	
2008–09	5	1ª And.	1st	

Season	Tier	Division	Place	Copa del Rey
2009–10	4	3ª	4th	
2010–11	4	3ª	16th	
2011–12	4	3ª	19th	
2012–13	5	1ª And.	W	
2013–14	6	Reg. Pref.	17th	
2014–15	DNP			
2015–16	DNP			
2016–17	DNP			
2017–18	8	3ª And.	8th	
2018–19	8	3ª And.	15th	
2019–20	8	3ª And.	13th	
2020–21	8	3ª And.	10th	
2021–22	9	3ª And.	13th	
2022–23	DNP			
2023–24	DNP			
2024–25	9	3ª And.	6th	
2025–26	9	3ª And.		

- 3 seasons in Tercera División
