= Joe Mbu (footballer) =

Cameroonian footballer

Personal information
- Date of birth: 14 February 1982 (age 44)
- Place of birth: Cameroon
- Position: Defender

Youth career
- Hibernian

Senior career*
Years	Team	Apps	(Gls)
2005–2008	Whitburn Junior		
2008–2013	Cowdenbeath	104	(3)
2013	→ Stenhousemuir (loan)	3	(0)
2013–2014	East Fife	25	(0)
2014–2017	Edinburgh City	30	(0)
- * Club domestic league appearances and goals as of 21:06, 1 June 2017 (UTC)

Joe Mbu (born 14 February 1982) is a Cameroonian retired semi-professional footballer who played as a defender. During his career, which started as a youth player at Hibernian, he played for Whitburn Junior, Cowdenbeath, Stenhousemuir on loan, East Fife and finally, Edinburgh City.

== Early and personal life ==
Born in Cameroon, Mbu moved to London at the age of one, and then to Scotland six years later. As well as playing football, Mbu has also worked as a banker.

== Career ==
Mbu spent six years playing football at youth level at Hibernian before being released by the club due to being deemed "too small". He then joined Whitburn Junior who play in the East Region of Scottish junior football and was voted their Player of the Year twice. During his time there he played for the Scottish junior national team several times and won the Quadrangular Tournament with Scotland.

Mbu was ready to join Arthurlie, but instead joined Cowdenbeath on a one-year deal in 2008. He enjoyed successive promotions with the club in 2008–09 and 2009–10 to the reach Scottish First Division, but was regularly injured as the team were relegated in their first season as a First Division club. Mbu won the Scottish Second Division in 2011–12 with the club and was voted in Team of the Year.

He signed on loan for Stenhousemuir in March 2013. He signed for East Fife on 1 July 2013. In July 2014, Mbu signed for Edinburgh City who were at the time in the Scottish Lowland League. Mbu won the Lowland League title twice with City in 2014–15 and 2015–16. He also helped City become the first non-league team to earn promotion to Scottish League Two of the SPFL in 2015–16 via the new pyramid system.

Mbu played in City's first ever SPFL league match on 6 August 2016 against Forfar Athletic, in which he was sent-off in the 93rd minute for an altercation with Forfar forward David Cox. Mbu announced his retirement from football at the end of the 2016–17 season due to injury, with his final appearance for Edinburgh City coming in a 3–2 defeat against Berwick Rangers on 6 May 2017.
