= Mark Ramsay =

Scottish footballer

Personal information
- Full name: Mark Ramsay
- Date of birth: 24 January 1986 (age 40)
- Place of birth: Dunfermline, Scotland
- Position: Midfielder

Youth career
- 1997–2003: Falkirk

Senior career*
Years	Team	Apps	(Gls)
2003–2006	Falkirk	3	(0)
2006	→ Berwick Rangers (loan)	9	(0)
2006–2007	Dundonald Bluebell		
2007–2013	Cowdenbeath	163	(18)
- * Club domestic league appearances and goals as of 00:30, 18 January 2014 (UTC)

Mark Ramsay (born 24 January 1986) is a Scottish retired footballer. Ramsay retired in 2013, having previously played for Falkirk, Berwick Rangers, Dundonald Bluebell and Cowdenbeath.

== Playing career ==
Ramsay began his career with Falkirk in 1997. He made his first team debut during the 2004–05 season, making ten appearances in the club's First Division championship winning campaign. He signed a contract extension in June 2005 as the club prepared for their return to the Scottish Premier League.

In January 2006, Ramsay joined Berwick Rangers until the end of the season. He appeared in 9 league matches and 12 in all competitions, including a 1–0 win on aggregate against Stenhousemuir in the Second Division play-offs. Ramsay was released from his contract by Falkirk in May 2006. He then moved into junior football, signing for Dundonald Bluebell alongside Martin Grehan and Paul McQuade. He helped the club win the East Region Central Division of the Scottish Junior Football Association before joining Second Division club Cowdenbeath in November 2007. "Mark is a very good player," said manager Brian Welsh. "He has good pace with quick feet and will offer us something a bit different from the midfield." In August 2013, Ramsay retired from senior football. Not known for his penalty prowess, he's continued the trend by missing a penalty at Humberg at the start of the 17/18 season for the mighty Primrose. As well as being a successful businessman, Mark has moved onto coaching youth football.
