= John Armstrong (footballer, born 1987) =

Scottish footballer

Personal information
- Full name: John William Armstrong
- Date of birth: 25 June 1987 (age 39)
- Place of birth: Edinburgh, Scotland
- Position: Centre back

Team information
- Current team: Edinburgh United

Youth career
- 2003–2007: Heart of Midlothian

Senior career*
Years	Team	Apps	(Gls)
2007–2009	Heart of Midlothian	0	(0)
2007–2008	→ Cowdenbeath (loan)	19	(1)
2008–2009	→ Cowdenbeath (loan)	31	(5)
2009–2015	Cowdenbeath	172	(8)
2015–	Edinburgh United		
- * Club domestic league appearances and goals as of 2 January 2016

John William Armstrong (born 25 June 1987) is a Scottish professional footballer who plays for Edinburgh United.

== Career ==
Armstrong was selected for the Lothian Schools XI in 2002 while a pupil at Beeslack High School (Penicuik), along with other Hearts youngsters Jason Thomson, David Gray and Andrew Driver. He joined Hearts from their youth system and tasted his first involvement of senior action when he was named as an unused substitute in their Scottish Premier League match against Dunfermline Athletic on 2 January 2007. He made his debut as a substitute at the same venue on 3 February 2007, as Dunfermline beat Hearts 1–0 in the Scottish Cup.

He joined Cowdenbeath on a season-long loan in July 2007, and was again loaned to Cowdenbeath in the 2008–09 season. On 13 October 2009 the defender left Hearts to return to Cowdenbeath, signing a two-year deal with the side. After six years with the club, Cowdenbeath agreed to terminate Armstrong's contract in November 2015 to enable him to pursue other career opportunities. Shortly after leaving Cowdenbeath, Armstrong signed for Scottish Junior side Edinburgh United.
