= Brian Colvin (referee) =

British football referee (born 1978)

Brian Colvin (born 20 September 1978) is a Scottish football referee, who has officiated in the Scottish Premier League and Scottish Professional Football League. Since retiring from officiating, 'Brizo’ as he is now known, has taken up lawn bowls, most recently winning a pairs trophy with his friend Neil.
