= 2007–08 Dumbarton F.C. season =

Dumbarton
2007-08 season
- Manager: Gerry McCabe/Jim Chapman
- Stadium: Strathclyde Homes Stadium, Dumbarton
- Scottish League Division 3: 8th
- Scottish Cup: Fourth Round
- Scottish League Cup: First Round
- League Challenge Cup: First Round
- Top goalscorer: League: Fergus Tiernan (6); All: Robert Campbell (6); Brian McPhee (6); Fergus Tiernan (6)
- Highest home attendance: 907
- Lowest home attendance: 282
- Average home league attendance: 521

Season 2007–08 was the 124th football season in which Dumbarton competed at a Scottish national level, entering the Scottish Football League for the 102nd time, the Scottish Cup for the 113th time, the Scottish League Cup for the 61st time and the Scottish Challenge Cup for the 17th time.

== Overview ==
Dumbarton's second successive season in the Third Division was not to be a successful one. A large intake of new players at the start was not the success that was hoped for and the mixed start which saw the club hold 5th place at the end of October was only to be followed by a slump in form. By the end of November Gerry McCabe had left the club to be replaced by Jim Chapman, but performances did little to improve the situation and in the end a disappointing 8th place was achieved.

In the Scottish Cup, a cup-run of sorts was gained. Early round victories over Forfar Athletic and Berwick Rangers was followed by a fourth round exit to Premier League St Mirren.

In the League Cup, Dumbarton lost in the first round to Cowdenbeath.

Finally, it would be another early League Challenge Cup exit, this time to East Stirling.

Locally, in the Stirlingshire Cup, a win and a defeat in the opening group ties was never going to be enough to progress to the final.

== Results & fixtures ==
Win Draw Loss

=== Scottish Third Division ===
4 August 2007 Scottish Third Division	Dumbarton	1–0	Elgin City	Dumbarton Football Stadium
	Tiernan 71'			Attendance: 640; Referee: C Charleston

11 August 2007 Scottish Third Division	East Stirlingshire	3–2	Dumbarton	Firs Park
	McBride, K 19'; Brand 41', 60'		Tiernan 12', 15'	Attendance: 306

18 August 2007 Scottish Third Division	Arbroath	1–1	Dumbarton	Gayfield Park
	Scott, B 25'		Hamilton 79'	Attendance: 647; Referee: S McLean

25 August 2007 Scottish Third Division	Dumbarton	2–0	Albion Rovers	Dumbarton Football Stadium
	Coyne 12', 62' (pen.)			Attendance: 644; Referee: T Robertson

1 September 2007 Scottish Third Division	Stranraer	2–0	Dumbarton	Stair Park
	Mullen 17'; Tade 84'			Attendance: 343; Referee: S Nicholls

15 September 2007 Scottish Third Division	Dumbarton	1–2	Stenhousemuir	Dumbarton Football Stadium
	Campbell 3'		Hampshire 4'; Desmond 89'	Attendance: 907; Referee: G Salmond

22 September 2007 Scottish Third Division	Dumbarton	1–1	East Fife	Dumbarton Football Stadium
	Tiernan 66'		McManus 15'	Attendance: 692; Referee: A Muir

29 September 2007 Scottish Third Division	Montrose	0–1	Dumbarton	Links Park
			Campbell 53'	Attendance: 545; Referee: S McLean

6 October 2007 Scottish Third Division	Dumbarton	0–0	Forfar Athletic	Dumbarton Football Stadium
				Attendance: 668; Referee: A Law

20 October 2007 Scottish Third Division	Elgin City	2–1	Dumbarton	Borough Briggs
	Smith 18'; Frizzel 33'		O'Byrne 80'	Attendance: 541; Referee: W Hornby

3 November 2007 Scottish Third Division	Dumbarton	1–1	Arbroath	Dumbarton Football Stadium
	McPhee 3'		Bishop 27'	Attendance: 637; Referee: G Salmond

10 November 2007 Scottish Third Division	Albion Rovers	2–0	Dumbarton	Cliftonhill
	Hunter 45'; Walker, P 49'			Attendance: 512; Referee: C Charleston

1 December 2007 Scottish Third Division	Stenhousemuir	2–1	Dumbarton	Ochilview
	Thomson 23'; Dempster 77' (pen.)		McPhee 45'	Attendance: 403; Referee: F McDermott

8 December 2007 Scottish Third Division	Dumbarton	0–2	Stranraer	Dumbarton Football Stadium
			Stewart 16'; Mitchell 87'	Attendance: 478; Referee: T Robertson

15 December 2007 Scottish Third Division	East Fife	2–0	Dumbarton	Bayview Stadium
	McDonald 3'; McGowan 83'			Attendance: 674; Referee: C Charleston

18 December 2007 Scottish Third Division	Dumbarton	3–1	East Stirlingshire	Dumbarton Football Stadium
	McPhee 11'; Geggan 44'; Hamilton 90'		Brand 61'	Attendance: 640; Referee: C Charleston

22 December 2007 Scottish Third Division	Dumbarton	1–3	Montrose	Dumbarton Football Stadium
	Campbell 90'		Baird 11' (pen.), 66'; Wood 13'	Attendance: 510; Referee: S McLean

29 December 2007 Scottish Third Division	Forfar Athletic	3–1	Dumbarton	Station Park, Forfar
	Fotheringham 2'; Smith 39'; Lunan 79'		Gentile 40'	Attendance: 422; Referee: S Nicholls

2 January 2008 Scottish Third Division	Dumbarton	2–0	Albion Rovers	Dumbarton Football Stadium
	Tiernan 53'; McPhee 63'			Attendance: 634

19 January 2008 Scottish Third Division	Stranraer	2–0	Dumbarton	Stair Park
	Tade 58'; Cashmore 83'			Attendance: 214; Referee: S O'Reilly

2 February 2008 Scottish Third Division	Dumbarton	1–4	Elgin City	Dumbarton Football Stadium
	Coyne 61'		Frizzel 1'; Charlesworth 32' (pen.), 44'; O'Donoghue 52'	Attendance: 514; Referee: B Winter

9 February 2007 Scottish Third Division	Montrose	3–1	Dumbarton	Links Park
	Wood 5'; Hunter 29', 69'		Moore 76'	Attendance: 458; Referee: S McLean

16 February 2008 Scottish Third Division	Dumbarton	0–3	East Fife	Dumbarton Football Stadium
			McDonald 20'; Smart 40', 89'	Attendance: 688; Referee: M Tumilty

23 February 2008 Scottish Third Division	Dumbarton	2–1	Arbroath	Dumbarton Football Stadium
	Canning 37', 61'		Scott, B 42'	Attendance: 511; Referee: W Collum

1 March 2008 Scottish Third Division	Albion Rovers	0–1	Dumbarton	Cliftonhill
			Canning 74'	Attendance: 329; Referee: C Charleston

5 March 2008 Scottish Third Division	Arbroath	0–0	Dumbarton	Gayfield Park
				Attendance: 441; Referee: F McDermott

15 March 2008 Scottish Third Division	Elgin City	2–1	Dumbarton	Borough Briggs
	O'Donoghue 25'; Shallicher 71'		Moore 70'	Attendance: 551; Referee: D Somers

18 March 2008 Scottish Third Division	Dumbarton	1–0	Stenhousemuir	Dumbarton Football Stadium
	McNaught 42'			Attendance: 389; Referee: S Conroy

22 March 2008 Scottish Third Division	Stenhousemuir	1–1	Dumbarton	Ochilview
	Harty 80'		Geggan 11'	Attendance: 449; Referee: C Brown

25 March 2008 Scottish Third Division	East Stirlingshire	1–1	Dumbarton	Firs Park
	Bolochoweckyj 10'		McNaught 86'	Attendance: 306; Referee: A Muir

29 March 2007 Scottish Third Division	Dumbarton	0–1	Stranraer	Dumbarton Football Stadium
			Tade 66'	Attendance: 639; Referee: E Norris

5 April 2008 Scottish Third Division	East Fife	2–1	Dumbarton	Bayview Stadium
	Templeman 42'; Cameron 58'		Tiernan 64'	Attendance: 639; Referee: E Norris

8 April 2008 Scottish Third Division	Dumbarton	0–0	Forfar Athletic	Dumbarton Football Stadium
				Attendance: 282; Referee: C Boyle

12 April 2008 Scottish Third Division	Dumbarton	0–0	Montrose	Dumbarton Football Stadium
				Attendance: 463; Referee: G Salmond

19 April 2008 Scottish Third Division	Dumbarton	1–0	East Stirlingshire	Dumbarton Football Stadium
	Hamilton 69'			Attendance: 612; Referee: W Hornby

26 April 2008 Scottish Third Division	Forfar Athletic	1–1	Dumbarton	Station Park, Forfar
	Ovenstone 71'		Hamilton 69'	Attendance: 400; Referee: W Hornby

=== CIS League Cup ===
7 August 2007 Scottish League Cup round 1	Cowdenbeath	2–0	Dumbarton	Central Park, Cowdenbeath
	Clarke 69'; Dalziel 77'			Attendance: 322; Referee: M Tumilty

=== Scottish League Challenge Cup ===
14 August 2007 Scottish Challenge Cup round 1	East Stirlingshire	4–2	Dumbarton	Firs Park
	Simpson 32', 48'; Struthers 71', 88'		Campbell 31', 53'	Attendance: 202; Referee: A Laws

=== Scottish Cup ===
27 October 2007 Scottish Cup round 2	Forfar Athletic	1–1	Dumbarton	Station Park, Forfar
	Goal		McPhee	Attendance: 382; Referee: E Norris

6 November 2007 Scottish Cup round 2R	Dumbarton	3–0	Forfar Athletic	Dumbarton Football Stadium
	Campbell 21'; Henderson 38'; MacFarlane 47'			Attendance: 310; Referee: E Norris

24 November 2007 Scottish Cup round 3	Dumbarton	2–0	Berwick Rangers	Dumbarton Football Stadium
	MacFarlane 5'; McPhee 36'			Attendance: 310; Referee: E Norris

12 January 2008 Scottish Cup round 4	St Mirren	3–0	Dumbarton	Love Street (stadium)
	Corrigan 17'; Barrow 38'; Mehmet 70'			Attendance: 2,828; Referee: A Muir

=== Stirlingshire Cup ===
20 July 2007 Group stage	Stenhousemuir	0–1	Dumbarton	Ochilview
			Yule	Attendance: 150

22 August 2007 Group stage	Stirling Albion	5–1	Dumbarton	Forthbank Stadium
	Goal		Gallacher

=== Pre-season ===
16 July 2007 Friendly	Dumbarton	0–0	Kilmarnock	Dumbarton Football Stadium
				Attendance: 755

21 July 2007 Friendly	Dumbarton	1–5	Dunfermline Athletic	Dumbarton Football Stadium
	MacFarlane 11'		Thomson 34'; Crawford 43', 71'; Morrison, O 54'; Hamilton 89' (pen.)	Referee: E Norris

24 July 2007 Friendly	Queen's Park	2–0	Dumbarton	Hampden Park
	Goal

26 July 2007 Friendly	Dumbarton	0–3	St Mirren	Dumbarton Football Stadium
			Kean 16', 35' >Corcoran 39'	Attendance: 709

30 July 2007 Friendly	Dumbarton	1–1	Celtic XI	Dumbarton Football Stadium
	Coyne		Goal	Attendance: 672

== League table ==
Pos	Team	Pld	W	D	L	GF	GA	GD	Pts
6	Elgin City	36	13	8	15	56	68	−12	47
7	Albion Rovers	36	9	10	17	51	68	−17	37
8	Dumbarton	36	9	10	17	31	48	−17	37
9	East Stirlingshire (Note: Had East Stirlingshire finished bottom of the table for what would have been a sixth consecutive time, they would have lost their Scottish Football League status, they finished second bottom.)	36	10	4	22	48	71	−23	34
10	Forfar Athletic	36	8	9	19	35	62	−27	33

Source: SPFL archive
Rules for classification: 1) points; 2) goal difference; 3) number of goals scored.

== Player statistics ==
=== Squad ===
No.	Pos	Nat	Player	Total		Third Division		League Cup		Challenge Cup		Scottish Cup	
No.	Pos	Nat	Player	Apps	Goals	Apps	Goals	Apps	Goals	Apps	Goals	Apps	Goals
	GK	(Scotland) SCO	David Crawford	30	0	26+0	0	0+0	0	0+0	0	4+0	0
	GK	(Scotland) SCO	Anton Nugent	12	0	8+1	0	1+0	0	1+0	0	0+1	0
	GK	(Scotland) SCO	Peter Shaw	2	0	2+0	0	0+0	0	0+0	0	0+0	0
	DF	(Scotland) SCO	John Aitken	2	0	0+0	0	0+1	0	1+0	0	0+0	0
	DF	(Scotland) SCO	Craig Brittain	24	1	20+1	1	0+0	0	0+0	0	3+0	0
	DF	(Scotland) SCO	David Craig	8	0	7+0	0	1+0	0	0+0	0	0+0	0
	DF	(Scotland) SCO	Grant Evans	10	0	8+1	0	0+0	0	0+0	0	1+0	0
	DF	(Scotland) SCO	Ross Farro	1	0	0+0	0	0+0	0	1+0	0	0+0	0
	DF	(Scotland) SCO	Kenny Haswell	11	0	6+2	0	1+0	0	0+1	0	1+0	0
	DF	(Scotland) SCO	Gordon Lennon	16	0	16+0	0	0+0	0	0+0	0	0+0	0
	DF	(Scotland) SCO	Richie McKillen	2	0	1+1	0	0+0	0	0+0	0	0+0	0
	DF	(Scotland) SCO	Anthony McLennan	1	0	0+0	0	0+0	0	1+0	0	0+0	0
	DF	(Scotland) SCO	Michael O'Byrne	34	1	30+0	1	1+0	0	0+0	0	3+0	0
	DF	(Finland) FIN	Axel Orrström	7	0	6+1	0	0+0	0	0+0	0	0+0	0
	DF	(Scotland) SCO	Craig Potter	25	0	23+0	0	0+0	0	0+0	0	2+0	0
	DF	(Scotland) SCO	Jonathan Yule	4	0	2+0	0	0+0	0	1+0	0	1+0	0
	MF	(Scotland) SCO	Kieran Brannan	7	0	2+5	0	0+0	0	0+0	0	0+0	0
	MF	(Scotland) SCO	Mark Canning	36	3	31+0	3	1+0	0	0+0	0	4+0	0
	MF	(Scotland) SCO	Danny Ferry	1	0	0+1	0	0+0	0	0+0	0	0+0	0
	MF	(Scotland) SCO	Andy Geggan	33	2	28+0	2	1+0	0	0+0	0	3+1	0
	MF	(Scotland) SCO	Chris Gentile	21	1	10+9	1	0+1	0	1+0	0	0+0	0
	MF	(Scotland) SCO	Chris Hamilton	33	3	19+9	3	1+0	0	0+0	0	3+1	0
	MF	(Scotland) SCO	Niall Henderson	16	1	13+0	0	0+0	0	0+0	0	3+0	1
	MF	(Scotland) SCO	Jason McLaughlin	4	0	3+1	0	0+0	0	0+0	0	0+0	0
	MF	(Scotland) SCO	Michael Stokes	6	0	6+0	0	0+0	0	0+0	0	0+0	0
	MF	(Scotland) SCO	Fergus Tiernan	29	6	22+4	6	1+0	0	0+0	0	2+0	0
	FW	(Scotland) SCO	Robert Campbell	21	6	15+1	3	1+0	0	1+0	2	3+0	1
	FW	(Scotland) SCO	Greg Cavanagh	1	0	0+0	0	0+0	0	0+1	0	0+0	0
	FW	(Scotland) SCO	Tommy Coyne	30	3	16+12	3	0+1	0	0+0	0	0+1	0
	FW	(Scotland) SCO	Liam Cusack	5	0	5+0	0	0+0	0	0+0	0	0+0	0
	FW	(Scotland) SCO	Sean Kerr	7	0	2+3	0	0+0	0	0+0	0	1+1	0
	FW	(Scotland) SCO	David MacFarlane	15	2	10+1	0	1+0	0	0+0	0	3+0	2
	FW	(Scotland) SCO	Chris Mackie	4	0	2+2	0	0+0	0	0+0	0	0+0	0
	FW	(Scotland) SCO	Mark McAlpine	1	0	0+0	0	0+0	0	1+0	0	0+0	0
	FW	(Scotland) SCO	David McNaught	19	2	6+12	2	0+0	0	1+0	0	0+0	0
	FW	(Scotland) SCO	Brian McPhee	27	6	17+6	4	0+0	0	0+0	0	4+0	2
	FW	(Scotland) SCO	Paul McQuilken	13	0	4+7	0	0+1	0	1+0	0	0+0	0
	FW	(Scotland) SCO	Michael Moore	7	2	7+0	2	0+0	0	0+0	0	0+0	0
	FW	(Scotland) SCO	Allan Orr	1	0	0+0	0	0+0	0	1+0	0	0+0	0
	FW	(Scotland) SCO	F Pierman	1	0	1+0	0	0+0	0	0+0	0	0+0	0
	FW	(Scotland) SCO	Ryan Russell	33	0	21+7	0	1+0	0	0+0	0	3+1	0
	FW	(Scotland) SCO	Bruce Thompson	1	0	0+0	0	0+0	0	0+0	0	0+1	0
	FW	(Scotland) SCO	Kenneth Wright	1	0	1+0	0	0+0	0	0+0	0	0+0	0

=== Transfers ===
==== Players in ====
Player	From	Date
(Scotland) David MacFarlane	(Scotland) Albion Rovers	5 Jun 2007
(Scotland) Brian McPhee	(Scotland) Airdrie United	11 Jun 2007
(Scotland) Jonathan Yule	(Scotland) Dumbarton Youth	9 Jul 2007
(Scotland) Robert Campbell	(Scotland) Kilmarnock (loan)	19 Jul 2007
(Scotland) Ross Farro	(Scotland) Seafield Thistle BC	19 Jul 2007
(Scotland) Ryan Russell	(Scotland) Morton	19 Jul 2007
(Scotland) Mark McAlpine	(Scotland) Hamilton	23 Jul 2007
(Scotland) Michael O'Byrne	(Scotland) Dundee United	26 Jul 2007
(Scotland) Allan Orr	(Scotland) Gretna	2 Aug 2007
(Scotland) John Aitken	(Scotland) Hamilton Place	9 Aug 2007
(Scotland) Anton Nugent	(Scotland) East Stirling	9 Aug 2007
(Scotland) Kieran Brannan	(Scotland) Hamilton Place	14 Aug 2007
(Scotland) Greg Cavanagh	(Scotland) Dumbarton Youth	14 Aug 2007
(Scotland) Niall Henderson	(Scotland) Gretna (loan)	14 Aug 2007
(Scotland) Anthony McLennan	(Scotland) Stenhousemuir	14 Aug 2007
(Scotland) Bruce Thompson	(Scotland) Queen's Park	14 Aug 2007
(Scotland) David Crawford	(Scotland) Queen's Park	27 Sep 2007
(Scotland) Richie McKillen	(Scotland) Alloa Athletic	5 Nov 2007
(Scotland) Sean Kerr	(Scotland) Livingston (loan)	9 Nov 2007
(Scotland) Craig Potter	(Scotland) Clyde	22 Nov 2007
(Scotland) Grant Evans	(Scotland) Hamilton (loan)	11 Jan 2008
(Scotland) Gordon Lennon	(Scotland) Partick Thistle	21 Jan 2008
(Scotland) Chris Mackie	(Scotland) Alloa Athletic (loan)	22 Jan 2008
(Finland) Axel Orrström	(Finland) Atlantis FC	24 Jan 2008
(Scotland) Michael Moore	(Scotland) Ayr United	31 Jan 2008
(Scotland) Michael Stokes	(Scotland) Airdrie United	22 Feb 2008
(Scotland) Kenneth Wright	(Scotland) Albion Rovers (loan)	22 Mar 2008
(Scotland) Liam Cusack	(Scotland) Hamilton	31 Mar 2008
(Scotland) Kenny Haswell	(Scotland) Aberdeen	31 Mar 2008
(Scotland) F Pierman		

==== Players out ====
Player	To	Date
(Scotland) Ryan Borris	(Scotland) Raith Rovers	23 May 2007
(Scotland) Craig Winter	(Scotland) Raith Rovers	26 May 2007
(Scotland) Jamie Smith	(Scotland) Stenhousemuir	4 Jun 2007
(Scotland) Stephen Grindlay	(Scotland) Queen of the South	12 Jul 2007
(Angola) José Quitongo	(Scotland) Livingston	22 Sep 2007
(Scotland) Anthony McLennan		29 Nov 2007
(Scotland) Paul Young		23 Jan 2007
(Scotland) Allan Orr		31 Jan 2008
(Scotland) Danny Ferry	(Scotland) Albion Rovers	9 Feb 2008
(Scotland) Mark McAlpine		28 Feb 2008
(Scotland) John McKeever	(Scotland) Bellshill Athletic	
(Scotland) David Bagan	(Scotland) Hurlford United	
(Scotland) John Aitken		
(Scotland) Ross Farro		
(Scotland) John Henry		
(Scotland) F Pierman		

== See also ==
- 2007–08 in Scottish football
