= List of winners of the Scottish League Two and predecessors =

A national fourth tier of the Scottish football league system was first established in the 1994–95 season, when the Scottish Football League was expanded to 40 clubs and split between four divisions. The fourth tier was known as the Third Division from 1994 until 2013. The Scottish Premier League and Scottish Football League merged in 2013 to form the Scottish Professional Football League, with the fourth tier becoming known as the Scottish League Two.

== Scottish Football League Third Division (1994–2013) ==
Season	Winner	Runner-up	Top scorer	
Season	Winner	Runner-up	Player	Goals
1994–95	Forfar Athletic	Montrose	Mark Yardley (Cowdenbeath)	23
1995–96	Livingston	Brechin City	Iain Stewart (Inverness Caledonian Thistle)	23
1996–97	Inverness Caledonian Thistle	Forfar Athletic	Iain Stewart (Inverness Caledonian Thistle)	27
1997–98	Alloa Athletic	Arbroath	Colin McGlashan (Montrose)	20
1998–99	Ross County	Stenhousemuir	Steven Ferguson (Ross County); Paddy Flannery (Dumbarton); Neil Tarrant (Ross County)	17
1999–2000	Queen's Park	Berwick Rangers	Steven Milne (Forfar Athletic)	17
2000–01	Hamilton Academical	Cowdenbeath	David McFarlane (Hamilton Academical)	24
2001–02	Brechin City	Dumbarton	Iain Stewart (Peterhead)	19
2002–03	Greenock Morton	East Fife	Alex Williams (Greenock Morton)	23
2003–04	Stranraer	Stirling Albion	Michael Moore (Stranraer)	24
2004–05	Gretna	Peterhead	Kenny Deuchar (Gretna)	38
2005–06	Cowdenbeath	Berwick Rangers	Martin Johnston (Elgin City)	20
2006–07	Berwick Rangers	Arbroath	Scott Chaplain (Albion Rovers); Martin Johnston (Elgin City)	18
2007–08	East Fife	Stranraer	John Baird (Montrose)	18
2008–09	Dumbarton	Cowdenbeath	Brian Graham (East Stirlingshire); Mike Jack (Annan Athletic)	15
2009–10	Livingston (2)	Forfar Athletic	Craig Gunn (Elgin City)	18
2010–11	Arbroath	Albion Rovers	Gavin Swankie (Arbroath)	22
2011–12	Alloa Athletic (2)	Queen's Park	Martin Boyle (Montrose)	22
2012–13	Rangers	Peterhead	Andrew Little (Rangers)	22

== Scottish League Two (2013–) ==
Season	Winner	Runner-up	Top scorer	
Season	Winner	Runner-up	Player	Goals
2013–14	Peterhead	Annan Athletic	Rory McAllister (Peterhead)	32
2014–15	Albion Rovers	Queen's Park	Peter Weatherson (Annan Athletic)	22
2015–16	East Fife (2)	Elgin City	Nathan Austin (East Fife)	22
2016–17	Arbroath (2)	Forfar Athletic	Shane Sutherland (Elgin City)	18
2017–18	Montrose	Peterhead	David Goodwillie (Clyde)	25
2018–19	Peterhead (2)	Clyde	Blair Henderson (Edinburgh City)	30
2019–20	Cove Rangers	Edinburgh City	Mitchel Megginson (Cove Rangers)	24
2020–21	Queen's Park (2)	Edinburgh City	Kane Hester (Elgin City)	15
2021–22	Kelty Hearts	Forfar Athletic	Nathan Austin (Kelty Hearts)	17
2022–23	Stirling Albion	Dumbarton	Tommy Goss (Annan Athletic)	23
2023–24	Stenhousemuir	Peterhead	Blair Henderson (The Spartans)	18
2024–25	Peterhead (3)	East Fife	Alan Trouten (East Fife)	22
2025–26	East Kilbride	The Spartans	Mark Stowe (The Spartans)	21

== Total wins ==
24 different clubs have won the fourth tier of Scottish football since it was created in the 1994–95 season.

As of 4 May 2025

- Clubs participating in the 2024–25 Scottish League Two are denoted in **bold** type.
- Clubs no longer active are denoted in italics.

Club	Winners	Runners-up
Peterhead	3	4
Arbroath	2	2
East Fife	2	2
Queen's Park	2	2
Alloa Athletic	2	—
Livingston	2	—
**Forfar Athletic**	1	4
Berwick Rangers	1	2
Cowdenbeath	1	2
**Dumbarton**	1	2
Albion Rovers	1	1
Brechin City	1	1
Montrose	1	1
Stenhousemuir	1	1
**Stirling Albion**	1	1
**Stranraer**	1	1
Cove Rangers	1	—
East Kilbride	1	–
Greenock Morton	1	—
Gretna	1	—
Hamilton Academical	1	—
Inverness Caledonian Thistle	1	—
**Kelty Hearts**	1	—
Rangers	1	—
Ross County	1	—
**Edinburgh City**	—	2
**Annan Athletic**	—	1
**Clyde**	—	1
**Elgin City**	—	1
**The Spartans**	–	1
