= 2026–27 Dumbarton F.C. season =

Dumbarton
2026–27 season
- Chairman: John Steele
- Manager: Frank McKeown (until 14 October) Danny Lennon (interim; 14 October - 18 November); Martin Fellowes (from 18 November)
- Stadium: The Rock - Sponsored by Marbill Coaches
- League Cup: Group stage

The 2026–27 season will be Dumbarton Football Club's second in Scottish League Two, the fourth tier of Scottish football, having finished ninth in the division in 2025–26. Dumbarton will also compete in the Scottish League Cup and the Scottish Cup.

== Story of the season ==
=== May ===
After a disappointing 2025–26 campaign, boss Frank McKeown released nine players on May 6. With captain Mark Durnan joining Brett Long, Gordon Walker, Adam Livingstone, Ally Roy, Jack Duncan, Tobi Joseph, Aaron Brown and Morgyn Neill in leaving the club. The same day it was announced that the pitch at The Rock would be replaced with an artificial surface for the new season. On May 19 goalkeeper coach Eric Phillips and Head of Youth Gordon Scanlan left the club. Defender Ali Omar became the first out of contract player to commit his future to the club, signing a new season long deal on May 22, and he was followed by top scorer and reigning Player of the Year Leighton McIntosh a day later. Deryn Lang was the club's first new signing of the summer, joining after scoring 14 goals for Stranraer the previous season. Another new arrival came in the shape of David McGurn who replaced Eric Phillips as the club's goalkeeper coach on May 26. On May 27, defender Kristian Webster signed a new two-year deal with the club.

=== June ===
On June 2 defender Michael Doyle signed a new deal. The same day a second new addition of the summer arrived in the shape of Thomas Robson who joined on a two-year deal from Clyde. A busy June 13 saw Scott Honeyman sign a new deal, and Lewis Spence join the club - while goalkeeper Shay Kelly departed by mutual consent. Youth team goalkeeper Luke Smallwood was next to leave, joining West of Scotland Football League side St Patrick's FPs on loan. On June 19, defender Michael Doyle was named as the club's new captain, with Josh Todd chosen as vice-captain. A day later the first friendly of the new season ended in defeat against Linlithgow Rose. Scott Honeyman, Leighton McIntosh and Aedan Gilfedder all scored in a 4-3 loss. On June 23, defender Connor Campbell joined from Rangers on a two-year deal. Two days later, Scott Tomlinson re-joined the club on a permanent deal after impressing during a loan spell the season previous.Both Stirlingshire Cup ties ended with Sons drawing a blank, losing 2-0 to Stenhousemuir and drawing 0-0 with Stirling Albion. The final game of pre-season ended in a 3-0 defeat to Ayr United.

=== July ===
David Craig was the club's sixth new face of the summer, signing a two year deal on July 9 having impressed on trial. On the park, the season kicked off at Cliftonhill with a 4-0 defeat to Scottish League Cup holder St Mirren. Sons started the game without a signed goalkeeper in their squad. On July 14, goalkeeper Aidan Rice joined on loan from Celtic having impressed during a loan spell the season previous. He made his debut a few hours after signing in a 4-1 defeat to Dunfermline Athletic - with Kai Kirkpatrick scoring Sons' first goal of the campaign. Another goalkeeper, Jack McConnell, was next to join - signing a season long deal after leaving Broxburn Athletic. He was followed by Canadian winger Josiah Sowa, who signed on loan from Queen's Park. Sowa made his debut the same day in a 5-3 defeat to East Kilbride - with Leighton McIntosh scoring a double on his 50th appearance for the club, and Scott Honeyman opening his account for the campaign. The League Cup ended with a 2-0 victory against Cove Rangers with McIntosh and Deryn Lang both on the scoresheet. On July 29 midfielder Ryan Blair left the club after four seasons and 145 appearances to join Brechin City. On July 31 a 10th new face of the window arrived, with midfielder Owen Hartington joining on loan from Celtic.

=== August ===
The league season began with a 2-0 defeat to Stirling Albion. Sons' first opening day defeat since 2019–20. A week later Sons secured their first win of the season, defeating Clyde thanks to a Scott Honeyman goal in the first game on an artificial pitch at The Rock. A 3-1 loss to Airdrieonians in the first Scottish Challenge Cup match of the season followed, with Aedan Gilfedder getting Sons' goal. Two days later, on August 18, the club signed midfielder Ally Spalding from East Kilbride. Youngsters Jon Dunbar, Aedan Gilfedder, Derin Marshall and Brandon Muir all signed their first professional contracts on August 14, before all immediately being loaned out. A 3-0 loss at home to Edinburgh City followed. On August 20 the club announced a Cooperation Agreement with Celtic. Prior to a game with Kelty Hearts on August 22, striker Robbie Cleary joined the club from Salford City - on a deal initially until January he made his debut as a substitute in a 3-1 defeat. Sons stopped the run of defeats on August 25, drawing 2-2 with Celtic B in the Scottish Challenge Cup, coming from 2-0 down to draw 2-2 thanks to a Connor Campbell effort and an own goal. The poor form continued with a 2-0 loss against Annan Athletic on August 29 that left Sons bottom of the League Two table.

=== September ===
On September 2 goalkeeper Harry Broun joined the club from Cumbernauld Colts with Aidan Rice set for a spell on the sidelines through injury. A day later Danny Lennon was appointed as the club's Director of Football. The Sons returned to winning ways on September 5, with Robbie Cleary and Ali Omar on target in a 2-1 win against top of the table Elgin City. With Omar's goal from well inside his own half. However the following match ended in a heavy defeat, 6-1 to Cove Rangers in the Scottish Challenge Cup. Connor Campbell got Sons' goal. Another defeat followed, 3-1 against Stranraer, leaving Sons winless on the road for a full calendar year. Tom Lang rejoined the club from Falkirk on September 15, nine years after first playing for the club. A day later goalkeeper Mason Munn signed on a season long loan from Rangers. Both players made their debut as Sons returned to winning ways, defeating The Spartans 3-0 in what would be Douglas Samuel's final game in charge of the Edinburgh club after 14 years in charge. Sons made it back-to-back wins for the first team with a 3-2 midweek victory against Kilmarnock B in the Scottish Challenge Cup. Deryn Lang, Josiah Sowa and Owen Hartington got the goals. The month ended with another 3-2 win, this time against Banks o' Dee. Leighton McIntosh, Scott Honeyman and Deryn Lang getting the goals. On September 29 defender Chris McKenna joined on loan from East Kilbride.

=== October ===
On October 1 midfielder Francis Turley joined on loan from Celtic until January. He made his debut, alongside Chris McKenna, as the Sons made it four wins in a row with a 2-1 success against Forfar Athletic - thanks to goals from Robbie Cleary and Owen Hartington. The winning run ended with a 2-1 loss to Clyde - with Leighton McIntosh getting Sons' goal and Chris McKenna sent-off. Three days later the Sons suffered a 4-0 defeat to local rivals Clydebank in the first West Dunbartonshire derby for 25 years, ending their participation in the Scottish Challenge Cup, with boss Frank McKeown stepping down on October 14. Danny Lennon, the club's Director of Football, took charge on an interim basis with his first game a 1-1 draw against Stirling Albion - with Josiah Sowa on target. On October 23 midfielder Lewis Spence left the club after just two appearances. A day later Leighton McIntosh got the only goal in a 1-0 Scottish Cup second round success against Keith. The month ended with an injury time defeat to Edinburgh City, whilst Johnstone Burgh would be Sons' Scottish Cup third round opponents - meaning that former boss Stephen Farrell would return to Dumbarton on the first anniversary of his departure from the club.

=== November ===
Sons ended a 14 month run without an away win to kick off November, defeating Elgin City 2-0 thanks to goals from Leighton McIntosh and Scott Honeyman. However that was followed by a 5-0 home defeat against bottom of the league Annan Athletic on November 14. On November 18 the club announced Martin Fellowes as their new head coach, becoming the youngest head coach in Scottish Professional Football League history at the age of 28. Fellowes faced a wait for his first game however, as Sons saw his planned first match against The Spartans called off due to a frozen pitch.

== First team transfers ==
- From end of 2025–26 season, to last match of season 2026–27

=== In ===
Player	From	League	Fee
Deryn Lang	Stranraer	Scottish League Two	Free
Thomas Robson	Clyde	Scottish League Two	Free
Lewis Spence	East Kilbride	Scottish League Two	Free
Connor Campbell	Rangers	Scottish Premiership	Free
Scott Tomlinson	Ayr United	Scottish Championship	Free
David Craig	Ayr United	Scottish Championship	Free
Aidan Rice	Celtic	Scottish Premiership	Loan
Jack McConnell	Broxburn Athletic	Lowland Football League	Free
Josiah Sowa	Queen's Park	Scottish Championship	Loan
Owen Hartington	Celtic	Scottish Premiership	Loan
Ally Spalding	East Kilbride	Scottish League One	Free
Robbie Cleary	Salford City	EFL League Two	Free
Harry Broun	Cumbernauld Colts	Lowland Football League	Free
Tom Lang	Falkirk	Scottish Premiership	Free
Mason Munn	Rangers	Scottish Premiership	Loan
Chris McKenna	East Kilbride	Scottish League One	Loan
Francis Turley	Celtic	Scottish Premiership	Loan

=== Out ===
Player	To	League	Fee
Mark Durnan	Johnstone Burgh	Lowland Football League West	Free
Brett Long	Johnstone Burgh	Lowland Football League West	Free
Aaron Brown			Free
Tobi Joseph	East Fife	Scottish League One	Free
Morgyn Neill	Elgin City	Scottish League Two	Free
Ally Roy	Annan Athletic	Scottish League Two	Free
Gordon Walker	Kelty Hearts	Scottish League Two	Free
Adam Livingstone	Forfar Athletic	Scottish League Two	Free
Jack Duncan	Tranent	Lowland Football League East	Free
Shay Kelly	East Kilbride	Scottish League One	Free
Luke Smallwood	St Patrick’s	West of Scotland Football League Division Four	Loan
Dean Rhappozzoh	Albion Rovers	Lowland Football League West	Free
Ryan Blair	Brechin City	Lowland Football League East	Free
Camryn Donald	Saltire City	South of Scotland Football League	Free
Brandon Muir	Dalbeattie Star	Lowland Football League West	Loan
Jon Dunbar	Vale of Clyde	West of Scotland Football League	Loan
Derin Marshall	Shotts Bon Accord	West of Scotland Football League	Loan
Aedan Gilfedder	Renfrew	Lowland Football League West	Loan
Attahir Ali	Saltire City	South of Scotland Football League	Free
Taylor-Phoenix Wright	Saltire City	South of Scotland Football League	Loan
Lewis Spence			Free

== Fixtures and results ==
Win Draw Loss Upcoming fixture

=== Friendlies ===
20 June 2026	Linlithgow Rose	4 - 3	Dumbarton	Prestonfield Stadium
15:00	Stenhouse 23', Rae 41', Elsaway 86', Trialist 89'		Scott Honeyman 2', Leighton McIntosh 52', Aedan Gilfedder 56'

30 June 2026	Ayr United	3 - 0	Dumbarton	Somerset Park Training Pitch
19:30	Luke McBeth 18', Mark McKenzie 20', Ross Taylor 55' (pen.)			Attendance: 200

=== Stirlingshire Cup ===
27 June 2026 Group stage	Stenhousemuir	2 - 0	Dumbarton	Ochilview Park
12:00	Kinlay Bilham 5', Trialist 21'			Attendance: 200

27 June 2026 Group stage	Stirling Albion	0 - 0	Dumbarton	Ochilview Park
14:00				Attendance: 200

=== Scottish League Two ===
1 August 2026 League Two	Stirling Albion	2 – 0	Dumbarton	Forthbank Stadium
15:00	Jordan Allan 26' (pen.) 56'	Report		Attendance: 865; Referee: Alastair Grieve

8 August 2026 League Two	Dumbarton	1 – 0	Clyde	The Rock, Dumbarton
15:00	Scott Honeyman 58'	Report		Attendance: 1,033; Referee: Connor Ashwood; Man of the Match: Leighton McIntosh

15 August 2026 League Two	Dumbarton	0 – 3	Edinburgh City	The Rock, Dumbarton
15:00		Report	Keir Foster 4', Innes Lawson 34', Murray Aiken 76'	Attendance: 725; Referee: Cameron Stirling

22 August 2026 League Two	Kelty Hearts	3 – 1	Dumbarton	New Central Park
15:00	Jamie Hislop 19', Lewis Moore 20', Alex Ferguson 73'		Leighton McIntosh 16' (pen.)	Attendance: 306; Referee: Lewis Hogarth

29 August 2026 League Two	Annan Athletic	2 – 0	Dumbarton	Galabank Stadium
15:00	Willie Gibson 57' (pen.), Keith Watson 68'	Report		Attendance: 302; Referee: Mark Daly

5 September 2026 League Two	Dumbarton	2 – 1	Elgin City	The Rock, Dumbarton
15:00	Robbie Cleary 43', Ali Omar 64'	Report	Jack MacIver 89'	Attendance: 689; Referee: Daniel Graves; Man of the Match: Ali Omar

12 September 2026 League Two	Stranraer	3 – 1	Dumbarton	Stair Park
15:00	Seb Mason 55', Lewis Dobbie 59' 72'	Report	Scott Honeyman 32'	Attendance: 452; Referee: Sean Murdoch; Man of the Match: Lewis Dobbie

19 September 2026 League Two	Dumbarton	3 – 0	The Spartans	Dumbarton Football Stadium
15:00	Deryn Lang 3', OG 61', Josiah Sowa 90+3'	Report		Referee: Ross Birrell; Man of the Match: Deryn Lang

4 October 2026 League Two	Dumbarton	2 – 1	Forfar Athletic	Dumbarton Football Stadium
15:00	Robbie Cleary 67', Owen Hartington 69'	Report	Luca Perrie 8'	Attendance: 742; Referee: Euan Birch; Man of the Match: Michael Doyle

10 October 2026 League Two	Clyde	2 – 1	Dumbarton	New Douglas Park
15:00	Scott Williamson 23', Jamie Bradley 45'	Report	Leighton McIntosh 88', Chris McKenna (red card)	Attendance: 711; Referee: Greg Soutar

17 October 2026 League Two	Dumbarton	1 – 1	Stirling Albion	Dumbarton Football Stadium
15:00	Josiah Sowa 79'	Report	Kevin Waugh 65'	Attendance: 895; Referee: Joel Kennedy; Man of the Match: Josiah Sowa

31 October 2026 League Two	Edinburgh City	2 – 1	Dumbarton	Meadowbank Stadium
15:00	Innes Lawson 10', Jack Leitch 90+3'	Report	Leighton McIntosh 32'	Attendance: 384; Referee: George Calder

7 November 2026 League Two	Elgin City	0 – 2	Dumbarton	Borough Briggs
15:00		Report	Leighton McIntosh 23', Scott Honeyman 46'	Attendance: 705; Referee: Euan Birch

14 November 2026 League Two	Dumbarton	0 – 5	Annan Athletic	The Rock, Dumbarton
15:00		Report	Steven Buchanan 18', Sean McKenzie 26', Charlie Maxwell 38', Aidan Smith 56'. Tam Muir 62'	Attendance: 767; Referee: Daniel Graves

4 December 2026 League Two	Dumbarton	–	Stranraer	The Rock, Dumbarton
19:45

2026 League Two	The Spartans	–	Dumbarton	Ainslie Park
15:00

=== Scottish Cup ===
24 October 2026 Second round	Dumbarton	1 - 0	Keith	Dumbarton Football Stadium
15:00	Leighton McIntosh 72'	Report		Attendance: 331; Referee: Jordan Curran

28 November 2026 Third round	Dumbarton	-	Johnstone Burgh	Dumbarton Football Stadium
15:00

=== Scottish League Cup ===
==== Matches ====
11 July 2026 Group stage	Dumbarton	0 - 4	St Mirren	Cliftonhill Stadium
15:00		Report	Sam Ramos 7' 73', Chris Mochrie 39', Thomas Falconer 77'	Attendance: 591; Referee: Lloyd Wilson

14 July 2026 Group stage	Dunfermline Athletic	4 - 1	Dumbarton	East End Park
19:45	Andrew Tod 26' 69', Oli Shaw 38', Josh Cooper 84'	Report	Kai Kirkpatrick 60'	Attendance: 1,375; Referee: Lewis Hogarth

18 July 2026 Group stage	East Kilbride	5 - 3	Dumbarton	K Park Training Academy
15:00	Cami Elliot 30' 38' 45', Darragh O'Connor 84', Craig McGuffie 90+6' (pen.)	Report	Leighton McIntosh 15' 81', Scott Honeyman 69'	Referee: Mark Daly

25 July 2026 Group stage	Dumbarton	2 - 0	Cove Rangers	Cliftonhill Stadium
15:00	Leighton McIntosh 5', Deryn Lang 64'	Report		Attendance: 124; Referee: Graham Grainger

=== Scottish Challenge Cup ===
11 August 2026 League phase	Dumbarton	1 - 3	Airdrieonians	The Rock, Dumbarton
19:45	Aedan Gilfedder 53'	Report	Dylan MacDonald 39', Lewis Gibson 63', Matty Yates 79'	Attendance: 445; Referee: Jamie Wilkie

25 August 2026 League phase	Dumbarton	2 - 2	Celtic B	The Rock, Dumbarton
19:45	Connor Campbell 45+2', OG 51'	Report	Lucas Clearie 10', Thomas Hatton 32'	Referee: Conor Greenan

8 September 2026 League phase	Cove Rangers	6 - 1	Dumbarton	Balmoral Stadium
19:45	Jordan White 25' 53', Destiny Oladipo 39', Arron Darge 57'. Liam Parker 73', Ryan Harrington 90+1'	Report	Connor Campbell 24'	Attendance: 103; Referee: Greg Soutar

22 September 2026 League phase	Dumbarton	3 - 2	Kilmarnock B	The Rock, Dumbarton
19:45	Deryn Lang 52', Josiah Sowa 62', Owen Hartington 76'	Report	Logan Foster 40', Remo Margiotta 86' (pen.)	Attendance: 267; Referee: Olivia Nicholson

26 September 2026 League phase	Dumbarton	3 - 2	Banks O'Dee	The Rock, Dumbarton
15:00	Leighton McIntosh {Goal|12}}, Scott Honeyman 28' (pen.), Deryn Lang 67'	Report	Grady McGrath 45+2', Liam Duell 78'	Attendance: 341; Referee: Mark Daly

13 October 2026 League phase	Clydebank	4 - 0	Dumbarton	Holm Park
19:45	Oisin McHugh 23', Neil McLaughlin 64', Dominic Docherty 78', Own Goal 90+2'	Report		Attendance: 1,400; Referee: Calum Foreman

== Player statistics ==
As of 20:19, 14 November 2026 (UTC)

=== All competitions ===
#	Position	Player	Starts	Subs	Unused subs	Goals	Red cards (red card)	Yellow cards (yellow card)
1	GK	(Scotland) Zach Balfour (Trialist)	1	0	0	0	0	0
12	MF	(Scotland) Calum Biggar (Trialist)	1	2	2	0	0	0
6	MF	(Scotland) Ryan Blair	0	2	2	0	0	0
25	GK	(Scotland) Harry Broun	2	0	1	0	0	0
16	MF	(Scotland) Barry Campbell	0	0	1	0	0	0
18	DF	(Scotland) Connor Campbell	6	5	10	2	0	0
20	FW	(Canada) Robbie Cleary	12	5	0	2	0	0
10	MF	(Scotland) David Craig	20	2	3	0	0	5
25	GK	(Scotland) Arran Crawford	0	0	1	0	0	0
24	DF	(Scotland) Michael Doyle	25	0	0	0	0	5
2	DF	(Scotland) Ronan Ferns (Trialist)	1	0	1	0	0	0
22	MF	(Scotland) Bradley Gibson	1	0	5	0	0	0
17	FW	(Scotland) Aedan Gilfedder	1	3	3	1	0	0
6	MF	(England) Owen Hartington	10	5	4	2	0	2
21	FW	(Scotland) Scott Honeyman	21	3	1	5	0	1
27	MF	(Scotland) Kai Kirkpatrick	9	10	1	1	0	5
5	DF	(Scotland) Tom Lang	5	0	0	0	0	5
9	FW	(Scotland) Deryn Lang	12	7	0	4	0	0
22	DF	(Scotland) Derin Marshall	1	0	6	0	0	0
28	GK	(Scotland) Jack McConnell	3	1	19	0	0	0
15	FW	(Scotland) Leighton McIntosh	22	2	0	9	0	2
19	DF	(Scotland) Ben McKenna	0	1	6	0	0	0
19	DF	(Scotland) Chris McKenna	6	0	0	0	1	0
25	GK	(Scotland) Jamie Meikle (Trialist)	1	0	0	0	0	0
54	GK	(Northern Ireland) Mason Munn	10	0	0	0	0	0
3	DF	(Somalia) Ali Omar	22	1	0	1	0	1
1	GK	(Scotland) Aidan Rice	8	0	2	0	0	0
34	DF	(England) Tommy Robson	17	2	4	0	0	2
2	DF	(Scotland) David Ruddy	0	0	1	0	0	0
11	MF	(Canada) Josiah Sowa	13	10	0	2	0	1
17	MF	(Scotland) Ally Spalding	6	5	6	0	0	1
16	MF	(Scotland) Lewis Spence	1	1	1	0	0	0
8	MF	(England) Josh Todd	13	4	6	0	0	0
7	MF	(Scotland) Scott Tomlinson	6	14	5	0	0	0
22	MF	(Scotland) Francis Turley	3	2	0	0	0	1
14	MF	(Scotland) Tony Wallace	2	7	14	0	0	0
4	DF	(Scotland) Kristian Webster	16	6	2	0	0	2

=== Captains ===
No.	P	Name	Country	No. games	Notes
24	DF	Michael Doyle	(Scotland)	24	Club captain
8	DF	Josh Todd	(England)	0	Vice-captain

Last updated: As of match played 23:53, 7 November 2026 (UTC)
Source: Competitive match reports.
Competitive matches only
Matches started as captain only
Country: FIFA nationality; No.: Squad number; P: Position; Name: Player name; No. Games: Number of games started as captain.

=== Management statistics ===
Last Updated 19:37 November 7, 2026.

Name	From	To	P	W	D	L	Win%
Frank McKeown	20 June 2026	14 October 2026	20	7	1	12	35.00
Danny Lennon (interim)	14 October 2026	17 November 2026	5	2	1	2	40.00
Martin Fellowes	18 November 2026	Present	0	0	0	0	0

== League table ==
Pos	Team	Pld	W	D	L	GF	GA	GD	Pts
5	Kelty Hearts	14	6	0	8	18	24	−6	18
6	Stirling Albion	14	5	3	6	21	30	−9	18
7	Dumbarton	14	5	1	8	15	25	−10	16
8	Edinburgh City	14	5	5	4	25	26	−1	15 (Note: Edinburgh City were deducted 5 points due to an insolvency event during the previous season.)
9	Forfar Athletic	14	4	3	7	16	26	−10	15

Updated to match(es) played on 14 November 2026. Source:
Rules for classification: 1) Points; 2) Goal difference; 3) Goals scored; 4) Head-to-head points; 5) Head-to-head goal difference; 6) Play-off (only for deciding promotion, play-off participation and relegation).
