= Mason Munn =

Northern Irish footballer (born 2006)

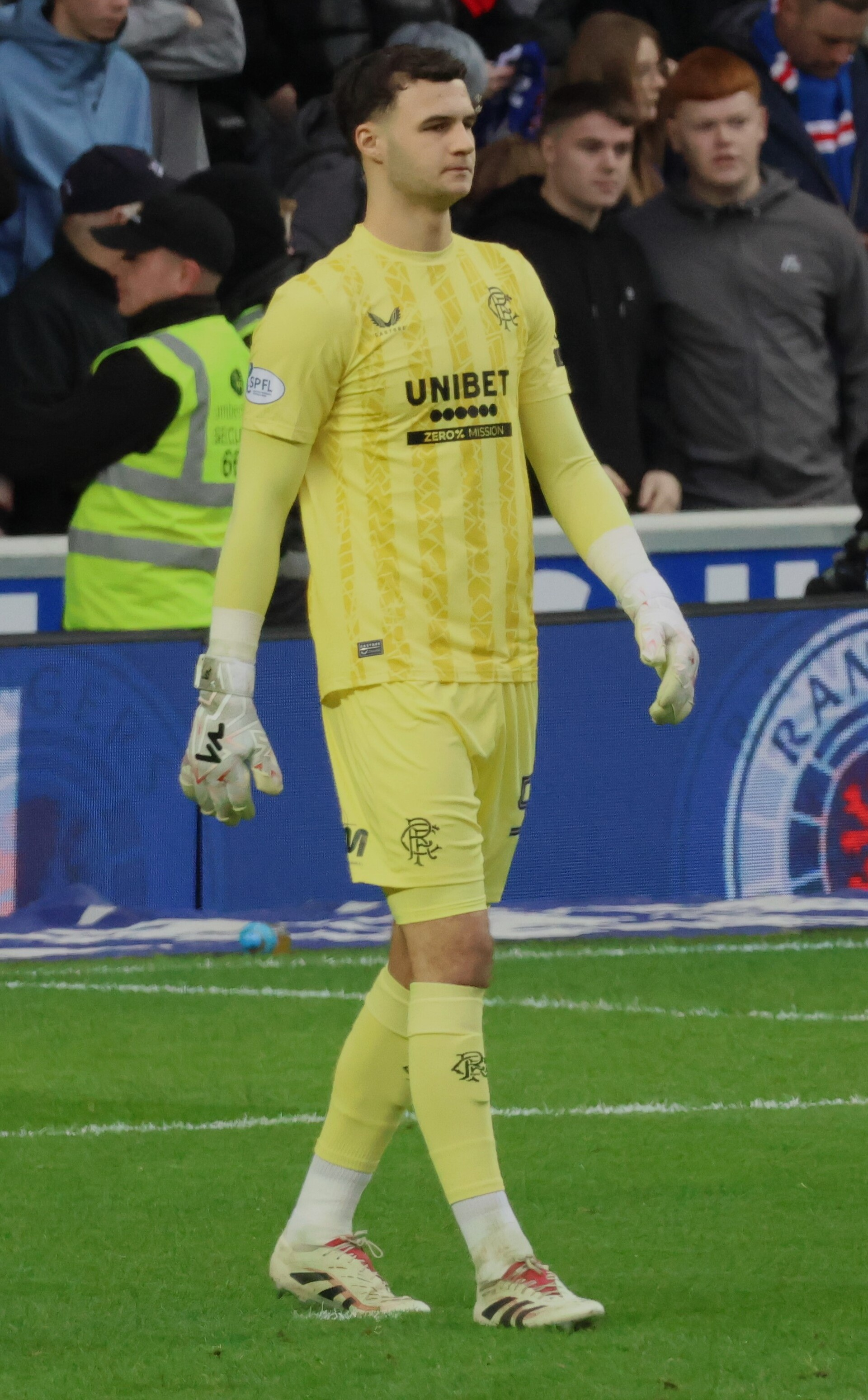

Personal information
- Full name: Mason Finlay Munn
- Date of birth: 30 March 2006 (age 20)
- Place of birth: Donaghadee, County Down Northern Ireland
- Height: 1.91 m (6 ft 3 in)
- Position: Goalkeeper

Team information
- Current team: Dumbarton (on loan from Rangers)
- Number: 54

Youth career
- Glentoran
- 2022–2025: Rangers

Senior career*
Years	Team	Apps	(Gls)
2025–	Rangers	0	(0)
2025–2026	→ Dunfermline Athletic (loan)	8	(0)
2026	→ Forfar Athletic (loan)	6	(0)
2026–	→ Dumbarton (loan)	7	(0)
- * Club domestic league appearances and goals as of 20:23, 14 November 2026 (UTC)

Mason Finlay Munn (born 30 March 2006) is a Northern Irish footballer who plays as a goalkeeper for Scottish League Two side Dumbarton on loan from Rangers.

== Early life ==
Munn is a native of Donaghadee, Northern Ireland. He has been described as "one of the brightest young prospects in Great Britain... captured the attention of many well-known Premier League clubs with his exploits between the sticks, with Arsenal among his prospective suitors".

== Club career ==
As a youth player, Munn joined the youth academy of Northern Irish side Glentoran. In 2022, he joined the youth academy of Scottish side Rangers. He was described as "impressing in the Rangers B team after overcoming a bad injury when he first moved to Scotland". He helped the club reach the 2024 Scottish Youth Cup final.

He made his full Rangers competitive debut in a Scottish Cup fourth round tie at home to Fraserburgh on 19 January 2025 where the hosts won 5-0 and Munn kept a clean sheet.

On 27 July 2025 Munn joined Scottish Championship side Dunfermline on a season long loan. On 2 August 2025, Munn made his debut for Dunfermline and kept a clean sheet during a 0–0 draw with Morton. Despite starting Dunfermline's first six league games Munn found game time hard to come by and only managed a further two appearances in October before dropping down to third choice keeper. On 5 February 2026, Rangers recalled Munn from his loan from Dunfermline due to a lack of game time.

On 6 February 2026, Munn joined Scottish League One side Forfar Athletic on loan for the remainder of the season. Munn was loaned out again in September 2026, joining Scottish League Two side Dumbarton on a season-long loan deal.

== International career ==
Munn has represented Northern Ireland internationally at youth level.

== Personal life ==
Munn is the son of Northern Irish footballer Jon Munn.

== Career statistics ==
As of 20:23, 14 November 2026 (UTC)

Appearances and goals by club, season and competition
Club	Season	League			National Cup		League Cup		Europe		Other		Total	
Club	Season	Division	Apps	Goals	Apps	Goals	Apps	Goals	Apps	Goals	Apps	Goals	Apps	Goals
Rangers	2024–25	Scottish Premiership	0	0	1	0	0	0	0	0	0	0	1	0
Rangers	Total		0	0	1	0	0	0	0	0	—		1	0
Dunfermline Athletic (loan)	2025–26	Scottish Championship	8	0	0	0	0	0	0	0	0	0	8	0
Forfar Athletic (loan)	2025–26	Scottish League Two	6	0	0	0	0	0	0	0	0	0	6	0
Dumbarton (loan)	2026–27	Scottish League Two	7	0	0	0	0	0	0	0	3	0	10	0
Career Total			22	0	1	0	0	0	0	0	3	0	25	0
