= Marley Redfern =

Scottish footballer

Personal information
- Date of birth: 13 December 2002 (age 23)
- Place of birth: Wishaw, Scotland
- Position: Midfielder

Team information
- Current team: Clyde
- Number: 11

Youth career
- Hamilton Academical

Senior career*
Years	Team	Apps	(Gls)
2020–2024	Hamilton Academical	40	(0)
2020	→ Blackburn United (loan)		
2024–	Clyde	57	(14)
- * Club domestic league appearances and goals as of 4 May 2026

Marley Redfern (born 13 December 2002) is a Scottish professional footballer who plays as a midfielder for Scottish League Two club Clyde.

== Career ==
Redfern began his career with Hamilton Academical, spending time on loan at Blackburn United in 2020. He signed a new contract with the Accies in March 2021, and made his senior debut for the club two months later, on 16 May 2021.

In June 2024 he signed for Clyde.

== Career statistics ==
As of match played 22 November 2025

Appearances and goals by club, season and competition
Club	Season	League			Scottish Cup		League Cup		Other		Total	
Club	Season	Division	Apps	Goals	Apps	Goals	Apps	Goals	Apps	Goals	Apps	Goals
Hamilton Academical U20	2019–20	—			—		—		1 (Note: Appearancce(s) in Scottish Challenge Cup)	0	1	0
Hamilton Academical	2020–21	Scottish Premiership	1	0	0	0	0	0	—		1	0
Hamilton Academical	2021–22	Scottish Championship	22	0	1	0	4	0	1	0	28	0
Hamilton Academical	2022–23	Scottish Championship	2	0	0	0	0	0	2 (Note: One appearance in Scottish Challenge Cup; One appearance in Scottish Championship play-offs)	0	4	0
Hamilton Academical	2023–24	Scottish League One	15	0	0	0	0	0	2 (Note: Appearance(s) in Scottish Championship play-offs)	0	17	0
Hamilton Academical	Total		40	0	1	0	4	0	5	0	50	0
Clyde	2024–25	Scottish League Two	24	4	1	0	4	1	1	0	30	5
Clyde	2025–26	Scottish League Two	11	6	0	0	4	1	3	2	18	9
Clyde	Total		35	10	1	0	8	2	4	2	48	14
Career total			75	10	2	0	12	2	10	2	99	14

== Honours ==
Hamilton Academical

- Scottish Challenge Cup: 2022–23
