= Robbie Cleary =

Canadian soccer player (born 2003)

Personal information
- Full name: Robert James Karl Cleary
- Date of birth: May 15, 2003 (age 23)
- Place of birth: Oakville, Ontario, Canada
- Height: 1.82 m (6 ft 0 in)
- Position: Forward

Team information
- Current team: Dumbarton
- Number: 20

Youth career
- 2010–2014: RVDL Lions
- 2014–2016: Burlington Bayhawks
- 2017–2022: Sigma FC

College career
Years	Team	Apps	(Gls)
2021	Oakland Golden Grizzlies	10	(0)

Senior career*
Years	Team	Apps	(Gls)
2021	Forge FC	5	(0)
2021	→ Sigma FC (loan)	1	(0)
2022	Sigma FC	18	(2)
2024–2026	Salford City	0	(0)
2024	→ F.C. United of Manchester (loan)	4	(0)
2025	→ Bamber Bridge (loan)	17	(4)
2025	→ Kerry (loan)	12	(3)
2026–	Dumbarton	11	(2)
- * Club domestic league appearances and goals as of 20:21, 14 November 2026 (UTC)

Robert Cleary (born May 15, 2003) is a Canadian professional soccer player who plays as a forward for Scottish League Two club Dumbarton.

== Early life ==
Cleary began his career with the RVDL Lions, created by former Dutch player Robin van der Laan, later playing for the Burlington Bayhawks in OPDL and then moved to Sigma FC at age 14.

== College career ==
In January 2021, Cleary committed to Oakland University. On October 9, 2021, he recorded his first two collegiate assists in a 4–3 victory over the Cleveland State Vikings. He played 10 games in 2021, recording 3 assists.

== Club career ==
In June 2021, Cleary signed a developmental contract with Canadian Premier League club Forge FC. He made his professional debut on July 1 against FC Edmonton, subbing in for Chris Nanco in an eventual 2–0 defeat. As part of his developmental contract, he also played with Sigma FC in League1 Ontario.

In 2022, he played for Sigma FC in League1 Ontario, also playing for the Sigma FC U21 in the Reserve Division where he scored 6 goals in 10 games.

In May 2024, Cleary signed with English EFL League Two club Salford City FC, with the deal taking effect upon the opening of the transfer window on July 1, 2024. He made his English professional debut on August 20, 2024 in an EFL Trophy game against Port Vale FC. In September 2024, he went on a month-long loan to F.C. United of Manchester in the seventh tier Northern Premier League Premier Division. In January 2025, he joined Northern Premier League Premier Division team Bamber Bridge FC, initially on a month-long loan. The loan was later extended to the end of April 2025. In July 2025, Cleary joined League of Ireland First Division side Kerry on loan for the remainder of the season. After leaving Salford in the summer of 2026, he joined Scottish League Two side Dumbarton in August 2026 - on a deal initially until January 2027. He scored on his first league start for the club in a 2-1 win against Elgin City in September 2026.

== Career statistics ==
As of 20:21, 14 November 2026 (UTC)

Appearances and goals by club, season and competition
Club	Season	League			National cup		Continental		Other		Total	
Club	Season	Division	Apps	Goals	Apps	Goals	Apps	Goals	Apps	Goals	Apps	Goals
Forge FC	2021	Canadian Premier League	5	0	0	0	0	0	0	0	5	0
Sigma FC (loan)	2021	League1 Ontario	1	0	—		—		—		1	0
Sigma FC	2022	League1 Ontario	18	2	—		—		—		18	2
Sigma FC	Total		19	2	—		—		—		19	2
Salford City	2024–25	EFL League Two	0	0	0	0	—		2 (Note: Appearances in EFL Trophy)	0	2	0
Salford City	2025–26	EFL League Two	0	0	0	0	—		0	0	0	0
Salford City	Total		0	0	0	0	—		2	0	2	0
F.C. United of Manchester (loan)	2024–25	Northern Premier League Premier	4	0	2	0	—		0	0	6	0
Bamber Bridge (loan)	2024–25	Northern Premier League Premier	17	4	0	0	—		0	0	17	4
Kerry (loan)	2025	League of Ireland First Division	12	3	4	0	—		—		16	3
Dumbarton	2026–27	Scottish League Two	11	2	1	0	0	0	5	0	17	2
Career total			68	11	7	0	0	0	7	0	82	11
