= Chris Hamilton =

Chris Hamilton may refer to:

- Chris Hamilton (cyclist) (born 1995), Australia road racing cyclist
- Chris Hamilton (footballer, born 1987), Scottish footballer
- Chris Hamilton (footballer, born 2001), Scottish footballer for Hearts
- Chris Hamilton (athlete), American cross-country runner
