= 2026–27 Scottish League Two =

Scottish League Two
- Season: 2026–27
- Dates: 1 August 2025 – 1 May 2026
- Matches: 74
- Goals: 249 (3.36 per match)
- Top goalscorer: Scott Williamson (17 goals)
- Biggest home win: Elgin City 4–0 Stirling Albion (29 August 2026); Edinburgh City 7–3 Stirling Albion (12 September 2026); The Spartans 5–1 Forfar Athletic (12 September 2026); Elgin City 6–2 Clyde (3 October 2026)
- Biggest away win: Edinburgh City 0–5 Elgin City (1 August 2026); Annan Athletic 1–6 Stranraer (10 October 2026); Dumbarton 0–5 Annan Athletic (14 November 2026)
- Highest scoring: Edinburgh City 7–3 Stirling Albion (12 September 2026)
- Longest winning run: Stranraer (4 games)
- Longest unbeaten run: Stranraer (13 games)
- Longest winless run: Stirling Albion (7 games)
- Longest losing run: Annan Athletic (6 games)
- Highest attendance: 1,033; Dumbarton v Clyde (8 August 2026)
- Lowest attendance: 236; Edinburgh City v Annan Athletic (22 August 2026)
- Total attendance: 37,959
- Average attendance: 535
- All statistics correct as of 21 November 2026.

The 2026–27 Scottish League Two (known as William Hill League Two for sponsorship reasons) is the 14th season of Scottish League Two, the fourth tier of Scottish football. The season began on 1 August 2026.

Ten teams are contesting the league: Annan Athletic, Clyde, Dumbarton, Edinburgh City, Elgin City, Forfar Athletic, Kelty Hearts, Stirling Albion, Stranraer and The Spartans.

== Teams ==
The following teams changed division after the 2025–26 season.

=== To League Two ===
Relegated from League One

- Kelty Hearts

=== From League Two ===
Promoted to League One

- East Kilbride

=== Stadia and locations ===
Annan Athletic	Clyde	Dumbarton	Edinburgh City
Galabank	New Douglas Park	The Rock	Meadowbank Stadium
Capacity: 2,504	Capacity: 6,018	Capacity: 2,020	Capacity: 1,280
Elgin City	Location of teams in 2025–26 Scottish League Two		Forfar Athletic
Borough Briggs	Location of teams in 2025–26 Scottish League Two		Station Park
Capacity: 4,520	Location of teams in 2025–26 Scottish League Two		Capacity: 6,777
Kelty Hearts	Stirling Albion	Stranraer	The Spartans
New Central Park	Forthbank Stadium	Stair Park	Ainslie Park
Capacity: 2,181	Capacity: 3,808	Capacity: 4,178	Capacity: 3,612

League Two football clubs in Edinburgh

=== Personnel and kits ===
Team	Manager	Captain	Kit manufacturer	Shirt sponsor
Annan Athletic	(Scotland) Willie Gibson	(Scotland) Tommy Muir	Uhlsport	M & S Engineering
Clyde	(Scotland) Darren Young	(Scotland) Andy Murdoch	Terrace	Cameron Event Logistics
Dumbarton	(Scotland) Martin Fellowes	(Scotland) Michael Doyle	VSN	JJR Print (Home); C&G Systems (Away)
Edinburgh City	(Scotland) Michael McIndoe	(Scotland) Jordan McGregor	Puma	Net Zero Fund Management
Elgin City	(Scotland) Stefan Laird	(Scotland) Russell Dingwall	Adidas	McDonald & Munro
Forfar Athletic	(Scotland) Jim Weir	(Scotland) Angus Mailer	Pendle	McLaren Bakers
Kelty Hearts	(Scotland) Michael Tidser	(Scotland) Jack Brydon	Joma	Bellway
Stirling Albion	(Scotland) Steven Whittaker	(Scotland) Josh Mullin	Hummel	M&G
Stranraer	(Scotland) Chris Aitken	(Scotland) Bernard Coll	Adidas	Stena Line
The Spartans	(England) James Craigen	(Scotland) Ayrton Sonkur	Macron	City Cabs

=== Managerial changes ===
Team	Outgoing manager	Manner of departure	Date of vacancy	Position in table	Incoming manager	Date of appointment
Stirling Albion	(Republic of Ireland) Alan Maybury	Sacked	10 May 2026	Pre-season	(Scotland) Steven Whittaker	10 May 2026
Elgin City	(Scotland) Allan Hale	Sacked	22 May 2026	Pre-season	(Scotland) Stefan Laird	27 May 2026
Kelty Hearts	(Scotland) Thomas O'Ware	Resignation	19 September 2026	9th	(Scotland) Michael Tidser	19 September 2026
The Spartans	(Scotland) Douglas Samuel	Disciplinary dismissal	19 September 2026	3rd	(England) James Craigen	10 October 2026
Dumbarton	(Scotland) Frank McKeown	Resignation	14 October 2026	6th	(Scotland) Martin Fellowes	18 November 2026

== League table ==
Pos	Team	Pld	W	D	L	GF	GA	GD	Pts	Promotion, qualification or relegation
1	Stranraer	15	10	3	2	32	9	+23	33	Promotion to League One
2	Clyde	15	10	3	2	40	25	+15	33	Qualification for the League One play-offs
3	Elgin City	15	6	3	6	29	24	+5	21	Qualification for the League One play-offs
4	Kelty Hearts	15	7	0	8	19	24	−5	21	Qualification for the League One play-offs
5	The Spartans	14	5	3	6	28	27	+1	18	
6	Stirling Albion	15	5	3	7	24	34	−10	18	
7	Forfar Athletic	15	4	4	7	17	27	−10	16	
8	Dumbarton	14	5	1	8	15	25	−10	16	
9	Edinburgh City	15	5	5	5	25	27	−2	15 (Note: Edinburgh City were deducted 5 points due to an insolvency event during the previous season.)	
10	Annan Athletic	15	4	1	10	20	27	−7	13	Qualification for the League Two play-off final

Updated to match(es) played on 21 November 2026. Source:
Rules for classification: 1) Points; 2) Goal difference; 3) Goals scored; 4) Head-to-head points; 5) Head-to-head goal difference; 6) Play-off (only for deciding promotion, play-off participation and relegation).

== Results ==
Teams play each other four times, twice in the first half of the season (home and away) and twice in the second half of the season (home and away), making a total of 180 games, with each team playing 36.

=== First half of season (Matches 1–18) ===
Home \ Away	ANN	CLY	DUM	EDI	ELG	FOR	KEL	STI	STR	SPA
Annan Athletic	—	1–2	2–0	12 Dec	2–0	1–1	1–2	0–1	1–6	2–4
Clyde	4–1	—	2–1	3–2	12 Dec	3–0	4–1	4–3	3–1	3–2
Dumbarton	0–5	1–0	—	0–3	2–1	2–1	12 Dec	1–1	4 Dec	3–0
Edinburgh City	1–0	2–6	2–1	—	0–5	1–1	0–1	7–3	19 Dec	1–3
Elgin City	5 Dec	6–2	0–2	0–0	—	1–1	4–1	4–0	1–5	19 Dec
Forfar Athletic	1–0	5 Dec	19 Dec	1–1	1–2	—	1–0	3–0	0–3	2–1
Kelty Hearts	2–1	19 Dec	3–1	1–3	0–1	2–1	—	3–2	0–1	5 Dec
Stirling Albion	19 Dec	1–1	2–0	5 Dec	2–1	5–2	2–1	—	2–2	0–2
Stranraer	0–1	0–0	3–1	0–0	3–0	12 Dec	2–0	3–0	—	1–0
The Spartans	3–2	3–3	TBC	2–2	3–3	5–1	0–2	12 Dec	0–2	—

Updated to match(es) played on 21 November 2026. Source:
Legend: Blue = home team win; Yellow = draw; Red = away team win.

=== Second half of season (Matches 19–36) ===
Home \ Away	ANN	CLY	DUM	EDI	ELG	FOR	KEL	STI	STR	SPA
Annan Athletic	—	9 Jan	30 Jan	1 May	13 Feb	17 Apr	27 Mar	27 Feb	20 Mar	2 Jan
Clyde	6 Mar	—	20 Mar	23 Jan	1 May	13 Feb	27 Feb	3 Apr	2 Jan	17 Apr
Dumbarton	3 Apr	26 Dec	—	9 Jan	23 Jan	27 Feb	1 May	13 Mar	17 Apr	6 Feb
Edinburgh City	20 Feb	27 Mar	6 Mar	—	2 Jan	30 Jan	10 Apr	13 Feb	24 Apr	20 Mar
Elgin City	10 Apr	20 Feb	27 Mar	13 Mar	—	23 Dec	30 Jan	9 Jan	6 Feb	24 Apr
Forfar Athletic	6 Feb	10 Apr	24 Apr	3 Apr	20 Mar	—	2 Jan	23 Jan	20 Feb	6 Mar
Kelty Hearts	23 Jan	24 Apr	20 Feb	6 Feb	17 Apr	13 Mar	—	26 Dec	6 Mar	3 Apr
Stirling Albion	24 Apr	6 Feb	2 Jan	17 Apr	6 Mar	27 Mar	20 Mar	—	30 Jan	20 Feb
Stranraer	23 Dec	13 Mar	13 Feb	27 Feb	3 Apr	1 May	9 Jan	10 Apr	—	23 Jan
The Spartans	13 Mar	30 Jan	10 Apr	26 Dec	27 Feb	9 Jan	13 Feb	1 May	27 Mar	—

First match(es) will be played: 23 December 2026. Source:
Legend: Blue = home team win; Yellow = draw; Red = away team win.

== Season statistics ==
As of 21 November 2026

=== Scoring ===
==== Top scorers ====
Rank	Player	Club	Goals
1	(Scotland) Scott Williamson	Clyde	17
2	(Scotland) Lewis Dobbie	Stranraer	11
3	(Scotland) Marc McNulty	The Spartans	8
4	(Scotland) Innes Lawson	Edinburgh City	7
4	(Scotland) Mark Stowe	The Spartans	7
4	(Scotland) Jordan Allan	Stirling Albion	6
7	(Scotland) Jack MacIver	Elgin City	5
7	(Scotland) Scott Shepherd	Forfar Athletic	5
7	(Scotland) Russell McLean	Stirling Albion	5

== Awards ==
Month	Manager of the Month		Player of the Month	
Month	Manager	Club	Player	Club
August	(Scotland) Stefan Laird	Elgin City	(Scotland) Jack MacIver	Elgin City
September	(Scotland) Chris Aitken	Stranraer	(Scotland) Lewis Dobbie	Stranraer
October	(Scotland) Steven Whittaker	Stirling Albion	(Scotland) Aaron Healy	Stranraer
November				
December				
January				
February				
March				
April				
