= Steve Ellison =

Scottish footballer (born 1970)

Personal information
- Full name: Steven Ellison
- Date of birth: 3 March 1970 (age 56)
- Place of birth: Edinburgh, Scotland
- Position: Goalkeeper

Senior career*
Years	Team	Apps	(Gls)
1990-1995	Meadowbank Thistle	76	(0)
1995-1996	Livingston		
1996-2000	Stenhousemuir	24	(0)
1997-1998	→ Alloa (loan)	4	(0)
2000-2006	Bonnyrigg Rose		
2008	Raith Rovers	0	(0)
2009-2010	Berwick Rangers	0	(0)

Managerial career
- 2011-2014: Bonnyrigg Rose (assistant)
- * Club domestic league appearances and goals

Steve Ellison (born 3 March 1970) is a Scottish former footballer who played as a goalkeeper for Stenhousemuir and Livingston.

== Playing career ==
Ellison started his career with Meadowbank Thistle. He made 76 appearances for the club over a five year spell until they relocated to Livingston.

In May 1996, Stenhousemuir signed Ellison for an undisclosed fee. He struggled to make himself a regular in the Warriors side, and had a short loan spell with Alloa in 1997.

He signed for Bonnyrigg Rose in 2000. Ellison enjoyed six years with the Rose before retiring in 2006.

== Coaching career ==
Following his retirement from playing, Ellison was on the coaching staff of Berwick Rangers until he left to become Max Christie's assistant at Bonnyrigg Rose in 2011.

He rejoined the coaching staff at the Wee Gers in 2015.

As of 2025, Ellison is a goalkeeper coach with Spartans.

== International career ==
Ellison was called up to the Scotland Junior International squad in April 2000.
