= 2025–26 Scottish League Two =

Scottish League Two
- Season: 2025–26
- Dates: 2 August 2025 – 2 May 2026
- Champions: East Kilbride
- Promoted: East Kilbride
- Matches: 180
- Goals: 528 (2.93 per match)
- Top goalscorer: Mark Stowe (21 goals)
- Biggest home win: East Kilbride 5–0 Forfar Athletic (30 August 2025); Clyde 5–0 Edinburgh City (21 February 2026); East Kilbride 5–0 Clyde (2 May 2026); Edinburgh City 5–0 Dumbarton (2 May 2026)
- Biggest away win: Annan Athletic 0–6 Clyde (13 September 2025); East Kilbride 0–6 The Spartans (27 January 2026)
- Highest scoring: Annan Athletic 3–4 Dumbarton (23 August 2025); Edinburgh City 4–3 Dumbarton (6 December 2025); Elgin City 1–6 East Kilbride (17 February 2026)
- Longest winning run: East Kilbride (7 games)
- Longest unbeaten run: Clyde (13 games)
- Longest winless run: Dumbarton (10 games)
- Longest losing run: Edinburgh City (7 games)
- Highest attendance: 1,321; The Spartans v East Kilbride (28 March 2026)
- Lowest attendance: 164; Edinburgh City v Elgin City (8 November 2025)
- Total attendance: 93,025
- Average attendance: 516
- All statistics correct as of 2 May 2026.

The 2025–26 Scottish League Two (known as William Hill League Two for sponsorship reasons) was the 13th season of Scottish League Two, the fourth tier of Scottish football. The season began on 2 August 2025.

Ten teams contested the league: Annan Athletic, Clyde, Dumbarton, East Kilbride, Edinburgh City, Elgin City, Forfar Athletic, Stirling Albion, Stranraer and The Spartans.

== Teams ==
The following teams changed division after the 2024–25 season.

=== To League Two ===
Promoted from Lowland League

- East Kilbride

Relegated from League One

- Annan Athletic
- Dumbarton

=== From League Two ===
Promoted to League One

- Peterhead
- East Fife

Relegated to Lowland League

- Bonnyrigg Rose

=== Stadia and locations ===
Annan Athletic	Clyde	Dumbarton	East Kilbride
Galabank	New Douglas Park	The Rock	K-Park Training Academy
Capacity: 2,504	Capacity: 6,018	Capacity: 2,020	Capacity: 700
Edinburgh City	Location of teams in 2025–26 Scottish League Two		Elgin City
Meadowbank Stadium	Location of teams in 2025–26 Scottish League Two		Borough Briggs
Capacity: 1,280	Location of teams in 2025–26 Scottish League Two		Capacity: 4,520
Forfar Athletic	Stirling Albion	Stranraer	The Spartans
Station Park	Forthbank Stadium	Stair Park	Ainslie Park
Capacity: 6,777	Capacity: 3,808	Capacity: 4,178	Capacity: 3,612

League Two football clubs in Edinburgh

=== Personnel and kits ===
Team	Manager	Captain	Kit manufacturer	Shirt sponsor
Annan Athletic	(Scotland) Willie Gibson	(Scotland) Tommy Muir	Matchwinner	M & S Engineering
Clyde	(Scotland) Darren Young	(Scotland) Andy Murdoch	Puma	Cameron Event Logistics
Dumbarton	(Scotland) Frank McKeown	(Scotland) Mark Durnan	Macron	JJR Print (Home); C&G Systems (Away)
East Kilbride	(Scotland) Mick Kennedy	(Scotland) Jack Leitch	Adidas	Jackton Moor (Home); SR Digital Consultancy (Away)
Edinburgh City	(Scotland) Michael McIndoe	(Scotland) Mark Weir	Puma	Net Zero Fund Management
Elgin City	(Scotland) Allan Hale	(Scotland) Russell Dingwall	Joma	McDonald & Munro
Forfar Athletic	(Scotland) Jim Weir	(Scotland) Stuart Morrison	Pendle	Orchard Timber Products
Stirling Albion	(Republic of Ireland) Alan Maybury	(Scotland) Ross McGeachie	Joma	M&G
Stranraer	(Scotland) Chris Aitken	(Scotland) BJ Coll	Adidas	Stena Line
The Spartans	(Scotland) Douglas Samuel	(Scotland) Kevin Waugh	Macron	City Cabs

=== Managerial changes ===
Team	Outgoing manager	Manner of departure	Date of vacancy	Position in table	Incoming manager	Date of appointment
Dumbarton	(Scotland) Stephen Farrell	Sacked	30 November 2025	7th	(Scotland) Frank McKeown	5 December 2025

== League table ==
Pos	Team	Pld	W	D	L	GF	GA	GD	Pts	Promotion, qualification or relegation
1	East Kilbride (C, P)	36	21	6	9	77	46	+31	69	Promotion to League One
2	The Spartans	36	18	10	8	60	39	+21	64	Qualification for the League One play-offs
3	Clyde	36	14	14	8	58	41	+17	56	Qualification for the League One play-offs
4	Forfar Athletic	36	13	11	12	51	47	+4	50	Qualification for the League One play-offs
5	Stranraer	36	12	11	13	46	46	0	47	
6	Elgin City	36	11	11	14	51	55	−4	44	
7	Annan Athletic	36	10	11	15	47	58	−11	41	
8	Stirling Albion	36	9	11	16	46	63	−17	38	
9	Dumbarton	36	10	10	16	47	61	−14	35 (Note: Dumbarton were deducted five points for entering administration during the previous season.)	
10	Edinburgh City (O)	36	10	9	17	45	72	−27	24 (Note: Edinburgh City were deducted 15 points due to an insolvency event.)	Qualification for the League Two play-off final

Rules for classification: 1) Points; 2) Goal difference; 3) Goals scored; 4) Head-to-head points; 5) Head-to-head goal difference; 6) Play-off (only for deciding promotion, play-off participation and relegation).
(C) Champions; (O) Play-off winners; (P) Promoted

== Results ==
Teams play each other four times, twice in the first half of the season (home and away) and twice in the second half of the season (home and away), making a total of 180 games, with each team playing 36.

=== First half of season (Matches 1–18) ===
Home \ Away	ANN	CLY	DUM	EKB	EDI	ELG	FOR	STI	STR	SPA
Annan Athletic	—	0–6	3–4	3–1	1–1	3–2	3–1	1–1	2–2	1–1
Clyde	1–0	—	3–1	2–2	2–1	0–0	0–0	1–2	0–0	1–3
Dumbarton	2–1	2–1	—	2–0	1–2	1–1	1–4	1–2	1–2	1–2
East Kilbride	1–3	1–1	1–1	—	1–1	3–0	5–0	2–0	3–1	1–3
Edinburgh City	2–2	1–4	4–3	2–2	—	1–3	1–1	1–2	1–3	1–3
Elgin City	2–0	1–1	2–0	0–1	2–4	—	2–1	3–0	1–2	2–3
Forfar Athletic	1–0	0–0	2–3	0–3	2–3	4–2	—	4–2	1–0	1–1
Stirling Albion	0–0	2–4	2–2	2–3	0–1	1–1	0–4	—	1–0	1–1
Stranraer	0–1	1–1	1–1	1–3	1–2	1–1	3–1	3–2	—	0–2
The Spartans	1–0	1–1	1–2	2–0	0–1	1–0	1–0	1–3	0–4	—

Legend: Blue = home team win; Yellow = draw; Red = away team win.

=== Second half of season (Matches 19–36) ===
Home \ Away	ANN	CLY	DUM	EKB	EDI	ELG	FOR	STI	STR	SPA
Annan Athletic	—	1–1	1–0	2–4	3–0	2–1	1–1	3–3	1–0	0–2
Clyde	3–1	—	2–0	1–3	5–0	1–1	1–1	3–1	2–1	2–1
Dumbarton	2–1	0–0	—	0–1	1–2	2–2	2–2	2–1	2–0	3–0
East Kilbride	2–1	5–0	3–1	—	4–0	3–0	3–1	3–2	0–2	0–6
Edinburgh City	2–2	0–2	5–0	0–2	—	0–3	0–0	1–4	4–1	0–3
Elgin City	0–3	2–0	1–1	1–6	3–0	—	2–0	1–0	0–1	3–3
Forfar Athletic	2–1	1–1	2–0	1–0	4–0	2–1	—	0–1	1–2	1–1
Stirling Albion	2–0	0–3	1–1	1–2	1–0	2–2	0–3	—	1–1	2–2
Stranraer	0–0	3–1	1–1	2–1	1–1	1–2	0–1	1–1	—	2–1
The Spartans	4–0	2–1	2–0	1–1	0–0	1–1	1–0	2–0	1–2	—

Legend: Blue = home team win; Yellow = draw; Red = away team win.

== Season statistics ==
As of 2 May 2026

=== Scoring ===
==== Top scorers ====
Rank	Player	Club	Goals
1	(Scotland) Mark Stowe	The Spartans	21
2	(Scotland) John Robertson	East Kilbride	20
3	(Scotland) Leighton McIntosh	Dumbarton	16
4	(Scotland) Connor Young	East Kilbride	14
4	(Scotland) Russell McLean	Stirling Albion	14
6	(Scotland) Marc McNulty	The Spartans	13

== Awards ==
Month	Manager of the Month		Player of the Month	
Month	Manager	Club	Player	Club
August	(Scotland) Mick Kennedy	East Kilbride	(Republic of Ireland) Robbie Mahon	Edinburgh City
September	(Scotland) Darren Young	Clyde	(Scotland) Marley Redfern	Clyde
October	(Scotland) Willie Gibson	Annan Athletic	(Scotland) Keith Watson	Annan Athletic
November	(Scotland) Allan Hale	Elgin City	(Scotland) Martin Rennie	Forfar Athletic
December	(Scotland) Chris Aitken	Stranraer	(Scotland) Deryn Lang	Stranraer
January	(Scotland) Douglas Samuel	The Spartans	(Scotland) Mark Stowe	The Spartans
February	(Scotland) Mick Kennedy	East Kilbride	(Scotland) Bobby McLuckie	East Kilbride
March	(Scotland) Frank McKeown	Dumbarton	(Scotland) Leighton McIntosh	Dumbarton
April	(Scotland) Jim Weir	Forfar Athletic	(Scotland) Scott Williamson	Clyde

== League Two play-offs ==
The Pyramid play-off was contested between the champions of the 2025–26 Highland Football League (Brora Rangers) and the bottom-placed club (Edinburgh City) in the League Two play-off final. The 2025–26 Lowland Football League champions (Linlithgow Rose) were ineligible to compete due to not having an SFA bronze licence. As Edinburgh City won the play-off, they remained in League Two, and Brora Rangers remained in the Highland Football League.

=== Final ===
Team 1	Agg.	Team 2	1st leg	2nd leg
Brora Rangers	1–3	Edinburgh City	1–1	0–2

==== First leg ====
9 May 2026	Brora Rangers	1–1	Edinburgh City	Brora
15:00	Anderson 11'		Iserhienrhien 44'	Stadium: Dudgeon Park; Attendance: 918; Referee: Iain Snedden

==== Second leg ====
16 May 2026	Edinburgh City	2–0 (3–1 agg.)	Brora Rangers	Edinburgh
15:00	Iserhienrhien 1', 14'			Stadium: Meadowbank Stadium; Attendance: 740; Referee: Peter Stuart
