= 2024–25 Scottish League Two =

Scottish League Two
- Season: 2024–25
- Dates: 3 August 2024 – 3 May 2025
- Champions: Peterhead
- Promoted: Peterhead; East Fife
- Relegated: Bonnyrigg Rose
- Matches: 180
- Goals: 469 (2.61 per match)
- Top goalscorer: Alan Trouten; 22 goals
- Biggest home win: East Fife 5–0 Bonnyrigg Rose (5 October 2024); Edinburgh City 5–0 The Spartans (15 February 2025); Peterhead 5–0 Bonnyrigg Rose (5 April 2025); Clyde 6–1 Peterhead (3 May 2025)
- Biggest away win: Stirling Albion 0–4 East Fife (24 August 2024); Edinburgh City 0–4 Peterhead (31 August 2024)
- Highest scoring: Edinburgh City 4–3 Stirling Albion (1 February 2025); Bonnyrigg Rose 3–4 Peterhead (8 February 2025); Edinburgh City 5–2 East Fife (22 March 2025); Clyde 6–1 Peterhead (3 May 2025)
- Longest winning run: East Fife (6 games)
- Longest unbeaten run: Elgin City; Peterhead (11 games)
- Longest winless run: Bonnyrigg Rose (11 games)
- Longest losing run: Elgin City (6 games)
- Highest attendance: 1,979; Peterhead 1–0 East Fife (26 April 2025)
- Lowest attendance: 226; Edinburgh City 0–1 Peterhead (11 January 2025)
- Total attendance: 108,333
- Average attendance: 601
- All statistics correct as of 3 May 2025.

The 2024–25 Scottish League Two (known as William Hill League Two for sponsorship reasons) was the twelfth season of Scottish League Two, the fourth tier of Scottish football. The season began on 3 August 2024 and concluded on 3 May 2025.

Ten teams contested the league: Bonnyrigg Rose, Clyde, East Fife, Edinburgh City, Elgin City, Forfar Athletic, Peterhead, Stirling Albion, Stranraer and The Spartans.

== Teams ==
The following teams changed division after the 2023–24 season.

=== To League Two ===
Relegated from League One

- Edinburgh City
- Stirling Albion

=== From League Two ===
Promoted to League One

- Stenhousemuir
- Dumbarton

=== Stadia and locations ===
Bonnyrigg Rose	Clyde	East Fife	Edinburgh City
New Dundas Park	New Douglas Park	Bayview Stadium	Meadowbank Stadium
Capacity: 3,000	Capacity: 6,018	Capacity: 1,980	Capacity: 1,280
Elgin City	Location of teams in 2024–25 Scottish League Two		Forfar Athletic
Borough Briggs	Location of teams in 2024–25 Scottish League Two		Station Park
Capacity: 4,520	Location of teams in 2024–25 Scottish League Two		Capacity: 6,777
Peterhead	Stirling Albion	Stranraer	The Spartans
Balmoor	Forthbank Stadium	Stair Park	Ainslie Park
Capacity: 3,150	Capacity: 3,808	Capacity: 4,178	Capacity: 3,612

League Two football clubs in Edinburgh

=== Personnel and kits ===
Team	Manager	Captain	Kit manufacturer	Shirt sponsor
Bonnyrigg Rose	(Scotland) Jonny Stewart	(Scotland) Kerr Young	Puma	G. Fitzsimmons and Son (Home); Shepherd Chartered Surveyors (Away)
Clyde	(Scotland) Darren Young	(Scotland) Lee Hamilton	Puma	HomesBook Factoring (Home); McGoldrick's Pool & Sports Bar (Away)
East Fife	(Scotland) Dick Campbell	(Scotland) Stewart Murdoch	Erreà	MPH Group (Home); Back Onside (Away); Harley Taxis (Third)
Edinburgh City	(Scotland) Michael McIndoe	(Scotland) Jon Robertson	Puma	Box Energy Renewable Solutions
Elgin City	(Scotland) Allan Hale	(Scotland) Matthew Cooper	Joma	McDonald & Munro
Forfar Athletic	(Scotland) Jim Weir	(Scotland) Stuart Morrison	Pendle	Orchard Timber Products
Peterhead	(Scotland) Jordon Brown (Scotland) Ryan Strachan	(Scotland) Jason Brown	Puma	The Score Group
Stirling Albion	(Republic of Ireland) Alan Maybury	(Scotland) Ross McGeachie	Joma	M&G
Stranraer	(Scotland) Chris Aitken	(Scotland) Grant Gallagher	Mizuno	Stena Line
The Spartans	(Scotland) Douglas Samuel	(Scotland) Kevin Waugh	Macron	J-TEQ EMS Solutions Ltd

=== Managerial changes ===
Team	Outgoing manager	Manner of departure	Date of vacancy	Position in table	Incoming manager	Date of appointment
Stirling Albion	(Scotland) Darren Young	Sacked	13 May 2024	Pre-season	(Republic of Ireland) Alan Maybury	2 June 2024
Stranraer	(Scotland) Scott Agnew	Resigned	1 September 2024	9th	(Scotland) Chris Aitken	30 September 2024
Clyde	(Scotland) Ian McCall	Mutual consent	10 October 2024	9th	(Scotland) Darren Young	23 October 2024
Forfar Athletic	(Scotland) Ray McKinnon	Sacked	9 November 2024	10th	(Scotland) Jim Weir	20 November 2024
Bonnyrigg Rose	(Scotland) Calum Elliot	Sacked	10 March 2025	10th	(Scotland) Jonny Stewart	13 March 2025

== League table ==
Pos	Team	Pld	W	D	L	GF	GA	GD	Pts	Promotion, qualification or relegation
1	Peterhead (C, P)	36	19	9	8	52	40	+12	66	Promotion to League One
2	East Fife (O, P)	36	20	5	11	65	37	+28	65	Qualification for the League One play-offs
3	Edinburgh City	36	17	5	14	54	47	+7	56	Qualification for the League One play-offs
4	Elgin City	36	16	7	13	48	41	+7	55	Qualification for the League One play-offs
5	The Spartans	36	15	7	14	48	47	+1	52	
6	Stirling Albion	36	14	6	16	50	57	−7	48	
7	Clyde	36	11	10	15	49	54	−5	43	
8	Stranraer	36	11	7	18	34	42	−8	40	
9	Forfar Athletic	36	8	12	16	29	42	−13	36	
10	Bonnyrigg Rose (R)	36	12	6	18	40	62	−22	36 (Note: Bonnyrigg Rose were deducted 6 points for failing to maintain a Bronze level licence.)	Qualification for the League Two play-off final

Rules for classification: 1) Points; 2) Goal difference; 3) Goals scored; 4) Head-to-to head points; 5) Head-to-head goal difference; 6) Play-off (only for deciding promotion, play-off participation and relegation).
(C) Champions; (O) Play-off winners; (P) Promoted; (R) Relegated

== Results ==
Teams played each other four times, twice in the first half of the season (home and away) and twice in the second half of the season (home and away), making a total of 180 games, with each team playing 36.

=== First half of season (Matches 1–18) ===
Home \ Away	BON	CLY	EFI	EDI	ELG	FOR	PET	STI	STR	SPA
Bonnyrigg Rose	—	2–1	1–1	2–0	2–0	0–1	0–1	2–1	2–0	2–2
Clyde	2–2	—	3–1	1–1	0–0	2–0	3–2	0–2	1–0	1–1
East Fife	5–0	5–1	—	2–0	2–1	2–1	2–0	1–1	1–2	5–1
Edinburgh City	2–2	1–0	2–4	—	1–0	2–0	0–4	1–2	1–2	2–0
Elgin City	2–1	4–2	4–2	3–3	—	2–1	2–0	2–4	1–0	1–1
Forfar Athletic	5–1	0–0	0–0	0–3	1–1	—	1–1	2–2	2–1	0–3
Peterhead	2–0	2–2	1–0	2–3	0–1	2–1	—	2–1	1–0	2–1
Stirling Albion	0–2	3–1	0–4	0–3	0–1	2–1	2–3	—	1–1	1–0
Stranraer	1–2	1–1	2–1	0–0	1–1	1–2	0–0	0–2	—	2–2
The Spartans	2–0	3–2	0–1	1–0	1–3	1–0	0–0	3–0	1–3	—

Legend: Blue = home team win; Yellow = draw; Red = away team win.
For upcoming matches, an "a" indicates there is an article about the rivalry between the two participants.

=== Second half of season (Matches 19–36) ===
Home \ Away	BON	CLY	EFI	EDI	ELG	FOR	PET	STI	STR	SPA
Bonnyrigg Rose	—	2–1	0–2	0–1	0–1	0–2	3–4	1–1	3–1	2–1
Clyde	3–1	—	1–2	0–2	0–0	1–1	6–1	2–0	2–0	0–2
East Fife	1–1	3–0	—	4–1	2–0	1–0	0–0	2–0	0–3	4–2
Edinburgh City	2–0	2–1	5–2	—	2–0	0–0	0–1	4–3	0–1	5–0
Elgin City	3–0	2–0	1–0	1–2	—	0–1	4–0	0–2	3–0	0–2
Forfar Athletic	0–2	0–1	1–0	0–1	1–1	—	0–0	0–0	0–1	0–2
Peterhead	5–0	2–2	1–0	2–0	2–0	2–2	—	3–2	1–0	1–0
Stirling Albion	3–0	1–4	1–0	2–1	3–1	3–1	1–2	—	3–1	1–3
Stranraer	0–1	1–2	0–2	2–0	1–0	0–1	0–0	3–0	—	2–0
The Spartans	3–1	2–0	0–1	3–1	1–2	1–1	1–0	0–0	2–1	—

Legend: Blue = home team win; Yellow = draw; Red = away team win.
For upcoming matches, an "a" indicates there is an article about the rivalry between the two participants.

== Season statistics ==
=== Scoring ===
==== Top scorers ====
Rank	Player	Club	Goals
1	(Scotland) Alan Trouten	East Fife	22
2	(Scotland) Connor Young	Edinburgh City	18
3	(England) Nathan Austin	East Fife	13
3	(Scotland) Blair Henderson	The Spartans	13
5	(Scotland) Cameron Ross	Bonnyrigg Rose	11
6	(Scotland) Kieran Shanks	Peterhead	10
6	(Scotland) Cammy Russell	The Spartans	10

== Awards ==
Month	Manager of the Month		Player of the Month	
Month	Manager	Club	Player	Club
August	(Scotland) Jordon Brown (Scotland) Ryan Strachan	Peterhead	(England) Nathan Austin	East Fife
September	(Scotland) Dick Campbell	East Fife	(Scotland) Alan Trouten	East Fife
October	(Scotland) Allan Hale	Elgin City	(Scotland) Jack Murray	Elgin City
November	(Scotland) Michael McIndoe	Edinburgh City	(Scotland) Connor Young	Edinburgh City
December	(Scotland) Michael McIndoe	Edinburgh City	(Scotland) Liam Scullion	Clyde
January	(Scotland) Dick Campbell	East Fife	(Scotland) Alan Trouten	East Fife
February	(Scotland) Michael McIndoe	Edinburgh City	(Scotland) Ouzy See	Edinburgh City
March	(Scotland) Jordon Brown (Scotland) Ryan Strachan	Peterhead	(Scotland) Martin Rennie	Clyde
April	(Scotland) Jordon Brown (Scotland) Ryan Strachan	Peterhead	(Scotland) Cammy Smith	Peterhead

== League Two play-offs ==
The Pyramid play-off was contested between the champions of the 2024–25 Highland Football League (Brora Rangers) and the 2024–25 Lowland Football League (East Kilbride). The winners, East Kilbride, faced the bottom-placed League Two club (Bonnyrigg Rose) in the League Two play-off final, being promoted to League Two for the 2025–26 season after winning 3–1 on aggregate. Bonnyrigg Rose were relegated to the Lowland League for the following season.

=== Bracket ===
Pyramid play-off					Final
L	East Kilbride	4	3	7
H	Brora Rangers	1	3	4
H	Brora Rangers	1	3	4	L/H	East Kilbride	3	0	3
					10 LT	Bonnyrigg Rose	1	0	1

=== Pyramid play-off ===
==== First leg ====
26 April 2025	East Kilbride	4–1	Brora Rangers	East Kilbride
15:00	Flanagan 20'; Fagan 42'; Leitch 82'; Mimnaugh 90+4'		Ewan 63'	Stadium: K-Park; Referee: Alastair Grieve

==== Second leg ====
3 May 2025	Brora Rangers	3–3 (4–7 agg.)	East Kilbride	Brora
15:00	Dingwall 13'; Cooper 26'; Sutherland 57'		Robertson 24'; Baldé 59'; S. Ferguson 80' (pen.)	Stadium: Dudgeon Park; Referee: Daniel Graves

=== Final ===
==== First leg ====
10 May 2025	East Kilbride	3–1	Bonnyrigg Rose	East Kilbride
15:00	Elliott 2', 52'; McGregor 72'		Arnott 16'	Stadium: K-Park; Attendance: 685; Referee: Dan McFarlane

==== Second leg ====
17 May 2025	Bonnyrigg Rose	0–0 (1–3 agg.)	East Kilbride	Bonnyrigg
15:00				Stadium: New Dundas Park; Attendance: 2,170; Referee: Euan Anderson
