= Axel Orrström =

Finnish footballer (born 1986)

Personal information
- Date of birth: 13 April 1986 (age 40)
- Place of birth: Helsinki, Finland
- Height: 5 ft 9 in (1.75 m)
- Position: Midfielder

Team information
- Current team: AC Oulu
- Number: 24

Senior career*
Years	Team	Apps	(Gls)
–2007	Atlantis FC		
2008	Dumbarton	7	(0)
2008–	AC Oulu	26	(2)

International career
- Finland U21
- * Club domestic league appearances and goals as of 5 December 2008

Axel Orrström (born 13 April 1986) is a Finnish footballer who plays for AC Oulu.

Orrström played for Atlantis FC until November 2007 and joined Scottish side Dumbarton in January 2008, leaving in April 2008, making a total of seven appearances. Orrström later signed for AC Oulu.

Orrström is a former Finnish youth international.
