= 2007–08 Scottish Football League =

Scottish football season

Statistics of the Scottish Football League in season 2007–08.

== Scottish First Division ==
Pos	Team	Pld	W	D	L	GF	GA	GD	Pts	Promotion, qualification or relegation
1	Hamilton Academical (C, P)	36	23	7	6	62	27	+35	76	Promotion to the Premier League
2	Dundee	36	20	9	7	58	30	+28	69	
3	St Johnstone	36	15	13	8	60	45	+15	58	
4	Queen of the South	36	14	10	12	47	43	+4	52	Qualification for the UEFA Cup second qualifying round (Note: Queen of the South qualified for the UEFA Cup Second Qualifying Round as Scottish Cup runners-up)
5	Dunfermline Athletic	36	13	12	11	36	41	−5	51	
6	Partick Thistle	36	11	12	13	40	39	+1	45	
7	Livingston	36	10	9	17	55	66	−11	39	
8	Greenock Morton	36	9	10	17	40	58	−18	37	
9	Clyde	36	9	10	17	40	59	−19	37	Qualification for the First Division Play-offs (Note: The 9th placed team were entered into a play-off with the Second Division's 2nd, 3rd and 4th placed teams. The winning team were awarded a place in the 2008–09 First Division, Clyde won the play-off to stay in the division.)
10	Stirling Albion (R)	36	4	12	20	41	71	−30	24	Relegation to the Second Division

Source: BBC Sport
Rules for classification: 1) points; 2) goal difference; 3) number of goals scored.
(C) Champions; (P) Promoted; (R) Relegated

== Scottish Second Division ==
Pos	Team	Pld	W	D	L	GF	GA	GD	Pts	Promotion, qualification or relegation
1	Ross County (C, P)	36	22	7	7	78	44	+34	73	Promotion to the First Division
2	Airdrie United (P)	36	20	6	10	64	34	+30	66	Qualification for the First Division Play-offs (Note: The 2nd, 3rd and 4th placed teams will be entered into a play-off with the First Division's 9th placed team. The winning team were awarded a place in the 2008–09 First Division, Clyde won the play-off to stay in the division. However, with Gretna being relegated to the Third Division, Airdrie were promoted to Division One. Airdrie United won promotion to the First Division after Gretna were relegated to the Third Division.)
3	Raith Rovers	36	19	3	14	60	50	+10	60	Qualification for the First Division Play-offs
4	Alloa Athletic	36	16	8	12	57	56	+1	56	Qualification for the First Division Play-offs
5	Peterhead	36	16	7	13	65	54	+11	55	
6	Brechin City	36	13	13	10	63	48	+15	52	
7	Ayr United	36	13	7	16	51	62	−11	46	
8	Queen's Park	36	13	5	18	48	51	−3	44	
9	Cowdenbeath (R)	36	10	7	19	47	73	−26	37	Qualification for the Second Division Play-offs (Note: The 9th placed team were entered into a play-off with the Third Division's 2nd, 3rd and 4th placed teams. The winning team were awarded a place in the 2008–09 Second Division, Cowdenbeath were relegated and Arbroath were promoted. Due to Gretna's relegation, Stranraer were also promoted.)
10	Berwick Rangers (R)	36	3	7	26	40	101	−61	16	Relegation to the Third Division

Source: SPFL Archive
Rules for classification: 1) points; 2) goal difference; 3) number of goals scored.
(C) Champions; (P) Promoted; (R) Relegated

== Scottish Third Division ==
Pos	Team	Pld	W	D	L	GF	GA	GD	Pts	Promotion or qualification
1	East Fife (C, P)	36	28	4	4	77	24	+53	88	Promotion to the Second Division
2	Stranraer (Note: Stranraer won promotion to Second Division after Gretna were relegated to the Third Division.) (P)	36	19	8	9	65	43	+22	65	Qualification for the Second Division Play-offs (Note: The 9th placed Second Division team were entered into a play-off with the Third Division's 2nd, 3rd and 4th placed teams. The winning team were awarded a place in the 2008–09 Second Division, Cowdenbeath were relegated and Arbroath were promoted. With Gretna being relegated to the Third Division, Stranraer were also promoted.)
3	Montrose	36	17	8	11	59	36	+23	59	Qualification for the Second Division Play-offs
4	Arbroath (P, O)	36	14	10	12	54	47	+7	52	Qualification for the Second Division Play-offs
5	Stenhousemuir	36	13	9	14	50	59	−9	48	
6	Elgin City	36	13	8	15	56	68	−12	47	
7	Albion Rovers	36	9	10	17	51	68	−17	37	
8	Dumbarton	36	9	10	17	31	48	−17	37	
9	East Stirlingshire (Note: Had East Stirlingshire finished bottom of the table for what would have been a sixth consecutive time, they would have lost their Scottish Football League status, they finished second bottom.)	36	10	4	22	48	71	−23	34	
10	Forfar Athletic	36	8	9	19	35	62	−27	33	

Source: SPFL archive
Rules for classification: 1) points; 2) goal difference; 3) number of goals scored.
(C) Champions; (O) Play-off winners; (P) Promoted

== See also ==
- 2007–08 in Scottish football
