= Robert Campbell (footballer, born 1986) =

Scottish footballer

Personal information
- Date of birth: 22 July 1986 (age 40)
- Place of birth: Glasgow, Scotland
- Position: Winger

Senior career*
Years	Team	Apps	(Gls)
2003–2008	Kilmarnock	2	(0)
2006–2007	→ Dundee (loan)	15	(0)
2007	→ Dumbarton (loan)	16	(3)
2008	Queen of the South	3	(0)
2008–2010	East Fife	21	(0)
2009	→ Annan Athletic (loan)	11	(0)

International career
2004–2006	Scotland U19	11	(0)
- * Club domestic league appearances and goals

Robert Campbell (born 22 July 1986) is a Scottish former footballer.

== Career ==
He was a left-sided forward and was part of the Kilmarnock side which won the Scottish Youth Cup in 2004, with Campbell himself scoring the winner. He had loan spells with Dundee and Dumbarton before leaving by mutual agreement. After a successful trial with Queen of the South, he signed for them until the end of the 2007-08 season. He was released at the end of his contract and subsequently signed for East Fife in June 2008. He joined Annan on loan in February 2009 for the rest of the season. At the end of the season he left East Fife due to injury problems. Robert also made 11 appearances for Scotland U19s with archie gemmel and tommy johnson as coaching staff
