= David McFarlane (footballer) =

Scottish footballer

Personal information
- Date of birth: 10 April 1979 (age 47)
- Place of birth: Glasgow, Scotland
- Height: 5 ft 11 in (1.80 m)
- Position: Forward

Youth career
- Hamilton Academical

Senior career*
Years	Team	Apps	(Gls)
1996–2002	Hamilton Academical	116	(50)
2002–2003	Stenhousemuir	27	(8)
–2007	Albion Rovers	15	(4)
2007–2008	Dumbarton	11	(3)
Total		169	(65)

International career
1997	Scotland U21	3	(0)
- * Club domestic league appearances and goals

David McFarlane (born 10 April 1979) is a Scottish footballer.

McFarlane played for Hamilton Academical, Stenhousemuir, Albion Rovers and Dumbarton.
