= 2007–08 Scottish Third Division =

Scottish Football League Third Division
- Season: 2007–08
- Champions: East Fife
- Promoted: East Fife; Stranraer; Arbroath
- Relegated: n/a
- Matches: 180
- Goals: 526 (2.92 per match)
- Biggest home win: East Fife 7–0 Stenhousemuir (29 September 2007)
- Biggest away win: Elgin City 0–5 Stranraer (27 February 2008)
- Highest scoring: East Stirlingshire 4–5 Albion Rovers (8 December 2007)
- Longest winning run: 8 games East Fife
- Longest unbeaten run: 11 games Arbroath; East Fife
- Longest winless run: 12 games East Stirlingshire
- Longest losing run: 10 games East Stirlingshire

The 2007–08 Scottish Football League Third Division was the 14th season in the format of ten teams in the fourth-tier of Scottish football. The season started on 4 August 2007 and ended on 26 April 2008. East Fife F.C. finished top and were promoted alongside Arbroath F.C. as play-off winners. Stranraer F.C. were also promoted due to Gretna being demoted to the Third Division.

== Teams for 2007–08 ==
Location of teams in 2007–08 Scottish Third Division

Berwick Rangers as champions of the 2006–07 season were directly promoted to the 2007–08 Scottish Second Division. They were replaced by Forfar Athletic who finished bottom of the 2006–07 Scottish Second Division.

A second promotion place was available via a play-off tournament between the ninth-placed team of the 2006–07 Scottish Second Division, Stranraer, and the sides ranked second, third and fourth in the 2006–07 Scottish Third Division, Arbroath, Queen's Park and East Fife respectively. The play-off was won by Queen's Park who defeated East Fife in the final. Stranraer were therefore relegated.

=== Overview ===
Relegated from Second Division to Third Division

- Forfar Athletic
- Stranraer (via play-offs)

Promoted from Third Division to Second Division

- Berwick Rangers
- Queens Park (via play-offs)

== Stadia and attendances ==
Team	Stadium	Capacity	Highest	Lowest	Average
East Fife	Bayview Stadium	2,000	1,300	540	769
Arbroath	Gayfield Park	6,488	959	421	611
Montrose	Links Park	3,292	1,470	321	597
Dumbarton	Strathclyde Homes Stadium	2,025	907	258	559
Elgin City	Borough Briggs	3,927	624	301	471
Stenhousemuir	Ochilview Park	3,776	755	212	414
Forfar Athletic	Station Park	5,177	615	270	410
East Stirlingshire	Firs Park	1,800	791	235	377
Albion Rovers	Cliftonhill	1,249	512	186	307
Stranraer	Stair Park	5,600	487	117	255

Source: The League Insider

== Managerial changes ==
Team	Outgoing manager	Manner of departure	Date of vacancy	Replaced by	Date of appointment
Stenhousemuir	(Scotland) Campbell Money	Resigned	29 September 2007	(Scotland) John Coughlin	12 October 2007
Ayr United	(Scotland) Neil Watt	Resigned	23 October 2007	(Scotland) Brian Reid	24 October 2007
Dumbarton	(Scotland) Gerry McCabe	Sacked	11 November 2007	(Scotland) Jim Chapman	31 December 2007
East Stirlingshire	(Scotland) Gordon Wylde	Resigned	28 February 2008	(Scotland) Jim McInally	13 March 2008
Forfar Athletic	(Scotland) Jim Moffat	Mutual consent	21 April	(Scotland) Dick Campbell	8 May
Berwick Rangers	(Scotland) Michael Renwick	Sacked	28 February	(Scotland) Allan McGonigal	13 May

== Table ==
Pos	Team	Pld	W	D	L	GF	GA	GD	Pts	Promotion or qualification
1	East Fife (C, P)	36	28	4	4	77	24	+53	88	Promotion to the Second Division
2	Stranraer (Note: Stranraer won promotion to Second Division after Gretna were relegated to the Third Division.) (P)	36	19	8	9	65	43	+22	65	Qualification for the Second Division Play-offs (Note: The 9th placed Second Division team were entered into a play-off with the Third Division's 2nd, 3rd and 4th placed teams. The winning team were awarded a place in the 2008–09 Second Division, Cowdenbeath were relegated and Arbroath were promoted. With Gretna being relegated to the Third Division, Stranraer were also promoted.)
3	Montrose	36	17	8	11	59	36	+23	59	Qualification for the Second Division Play-offs
4	Arbroath (P, O)	36	14	10	12	54	47	+7	52	Qualification for the Second Division Play-offs
5	Stenhousemuir	36	13	9	14	50	59	−9	48	
6	Elgin City	36	13	8	15	56	68	−12	47	
7	Albion Rovers	36	9	10	17	51	68	−17	37	
8	Dumbarton	36	9	10	17	31	48	−17	37	
9	East Stirlingshire (Note: Had East Stirlingshire finished bottom of the table for what would have been a sixth consecutive time, they would have lost their Scottish Football League status, they finished second bottom.)	36	10	4	22	48	71	−23	34	
10	Forfar Athletic	36	8	9	19	35	62	−27	33	

Source: SPFL archive
Rules for classification: 1) points; 2) goal difference; 3) number of goals scored.
(C) Champions; (O) Play-off winners; (P) Promoted

== Results ==
Teams play each other four times in this league. In the first half of the season each team plays every other team twice (home and away) and then do the same in the second half of the season.

=== First half of season ===
Home \ Away	ALB	ARB	DUM	EFI	EST	ELG	FOR	MON	STE	STR
Albion Rovers		5–2	2–0	1–4	2–3	3–4	2–1	1–3	1–1	3–2
Arbroath	1–0		1–1	2–3	2–0	4–0	3–4	0–0	2–2	2–2
Dumbarton	2–0	1–1		1–1	3–1	1–0	0–0	1–3	1–2	0–2
East Fife	4–0	0–2	2–0		3–1	4–0	3–0	2–0	7–0	3–1
East Stirlingshire	4–5	2–3	3–2	0–2		3–1	2–1	0–3	1–1	2–3
Elgin City	3–2	1–3	2–1	2–3	6–0		2–2	0–2	2–0	0–5
Forfar Athletic	1–0	1–3	3–1	0–2	0–2	4–0		1–4	0–1	1–1
Montrose	0–1	3–3	0–1	3–1	3–1	0–0	0–1		1–0	2–4
Stenhousemuir	0–1	1–0	2–1	2–1	0–3	2–3	4–0	0–4		1–4
Stranraer	3–1	1–1	2–0	0–2	2–1	3–3	3–0	1–0	2–3	

Source: BBC Sport
Legend: Blue = home team win; Yellow = draw; Red = away team win.

=== Second half of season ===
Home \ Away	ALB	ARB	DUM	EFI	EST	ELG	FOR	MON	STE	STR
Albion Rovers		0–2	0–1	2–2	2–2	1–1	0–0	0–3	3–3	1–1
Arbroath	1–4		0–0	0–1	0–1	2–0	1–1	2–1	1–0	0–0
Dumbarton	2–0	2–1		0–3	1–0	1–4	0–0	0–0	1–0	0–1
East Fife	0–0	2–1	2–1		1–0	2–0	3–0	0–0	0–1	2–1
East Stirlingshire	3–0	0–1	1–1	0–3		0–0	4–1	3–1	3–4	1–3
Elgin City	1–1	2–1	2–1	1–2	3–0		3–1	2–1	1–5	2–3
Forfar Athletic	1–4	1–0	1–1	2–3	1–0	0–1		1–1	1–2	1–0
Montrose	2–1	5–0	3–1	0–1	2–0	3–2	2–2		2–1	0–2
Stenhousemuir	2–2	0–3	1–1	0–1	3–0	2–2	2–0	0–0		1–1
Stranraer	3–0	0–3	2–0	0–2	2–1	0–0	2–1	0–2	3–1	

Updated to match(es) played on 27 April. Source: BBC Sport
Legend: Blue = home team win; Yellow = draw; Red = away team win.

== Top scorers ==
Scorer	Goals	Team
(Scotland) John Baird	18	Montrose
(Scotland) Paul McManus	17	East Fife
(Scotland) Michael Mullen	13	Stranraer
(Scotland) Roddy Hunter	12	Montrose
(Scotland) Darren Shallicker	12	Elgin City
(Scotland) Andrew Brand	11	East Stirlingshire
(Scotland) John Gemmell	11	Albion Rovers
(Scotland) Brian Scott	11	Arbroath
(France) Gregory Tade	11	Stranraer
(Scotland) Joseph Savage	10	East Stirlingshire
(Scotland) Kenny Wright	10	Albion Rovers
(Scotland) Scott Dalziel	9	Stenhousemuir
(Scotland) William Martin	8	Albion Rovers
(Scotland) Barry Sellars	8	Arbroath
(Scotland) Douglas Cameron	8	East Fife
(Scotland) Greig McDonald	7	East Fife

Source: The League Insider

== Events ==
- 15 March: East Fife confirm their promotion to the Second Division as Third Division champions with a 3–0 victory over East Stirlingshire, becoming the first team in Britain to win a league trophy in the 2007–08 season.
- 29 March: Berwick Rangers are relegated from the Second Division after a 2–2 draw with Peterhead.
- 10 May: Arbroath are promoted to the Second Division after a 2–1 aggregate win over Stranraer in the Second Division play-off final. Cowdenbeath, who were beaten by Arbroath in the semi-finals, are relegated to the Third Division.
- 29 May: Second Division play-off runners-up Stranraer are promoted to the Second Division following Gretna's demotion to the Third Division.

== Monthly awards ==
Month	Third Division manager	SFL Player	SFL Young player
August	(Scotland) Gordon Wylde (East Stirlingshire)	First Division player	First Division player
September	(Scotland) John McGlashan (Arbroath)	Second Division player	First Division player
October	(England) David Baikie (East Fife)	First Division player	First Division player
November	(England) David Baikie (East Fife)	First Division player	(Scotland) Scott Fox (East Fife)
December	(Scotland) Gerry Britton (Stranraer)	Second Division player	First Division player
January	(England) David Baikie (East Fife)	Second Division player	First Division player
February	(Scotland) Derek Ferguson (Stranraer)	First Division player	First Division player
March	(Scotland) Robbie Williamson (Elgin City)	First Division player	First Division player
April	(Scotland) Derek Ferguson (Stranraer)	First Division player	First Division player
