= Chris Hamilton (footballer, born 1987) =

Scottish footballer

Personal information
- Date of birth: 21 November 1987 (age 38)
- Position: Midfielder

Youth career
- Queen's Park

Senior career*
Years	Team	Apps	(Gls)
2003–2006	Livingston	0	(0)
2006–2008	Dumbarton	55	(5)
2008–2009	Stirling Albion	31	(4)
2009–2010	Queen's Park	31	(2)
2010–2012	Albion Rovers	36	(6)

Managerial career
- 2017–2018: Lincoln City Women
- 2018–2020: Barnsley Women
- 2020–2022: York City Ladies
- * Club domestic league appearances and goals

Christopher Hamilton (born 21 November 1987) is a Scottish football manager and former player who played for Livingston, Dumbarton, Stirling Albion, Queen's Park and Albion Rovers.

== Playing career ==
Hamilton was a product of the Livingston youth academy, but left in 2006 without making a first team appearance. He joined Scottish Third Division club Dumbarton, and made his debut on 9 September 2006, in a 2–0 win against Elgin City. He scored his first goal for the club on 4 November, in a 2–0 win against Berwick Rangers, and was a half-time substitute in Dumbarton's 4–0 loss to Celtic in the Scottish Cup third-round, on 6 January 2007. Hamilton joined Scottish Second Division club Stirling Albion in August 2008. He scored a hat-trick against Stranraer on 24 January 2009, in a 2–8 win. Hamilton joined Scottish Third Division club Queen's Park in August 2009, before joining Albion Rovers in May 2010, helping the club win the 2010–11 Second Division play-offs, before retiring in 2012.

== Managerial career ==
After retiring, Hamilton became 1st Team Coach with Spalding United in 2016. He left the position in 2017 to become manager of Lincoln City Women, winning the 2017–18 East Midlands Premier Division. A two year spell as manager of Barnsley Women followed from 2018 to 2020, before becoming York City Ladies manager in July 2020.

Under his guidance York won the 2021–22 North East Premier Division. Hamilton left York City Ladies in June 2022.

== Honours ==
=== Player ===
Albion Rovers

- Scottish Football League Second Division play-offs: 2010–11

=== Manager ===
Lincoln City Women

- East Midlands Premier Division: 2017–18

York City Ladies

- North East Premier Division: 2021–22
