= Michael Moore (footballer) =

Scottish footballer (born 1981)

Personal information
- Full name: Michael Jordan Moore
- Date of birth: 24 March 1981 (age 45)
- Place of birth: Paisley, Scotland
- Position: Forward

Team information
- Current team: Stenhousemuir (Assistant Manager)

Senior career*
Years	Team	Apps	(Gls)
1998–2002	Hamilton Academical	88	(27)
2002–2004	Stranraer	61	(34)
2004–2005	St Johnstone	24	(6)
2005	→ Stranraer (loan)	7	(2)
2005–2007	Stranraer	55	(21)
2007–2008	Ayr United	14	(5)
2008–2009	Dumbarton	13	(3)
2009	→ Stranraer (loan)	5	(1)
2009–2013	Stranraer	127	(36)
2013–2014	Kilbirnie Ladeside	20	(5)
- * Club domestic league appearances and goals as of 16:30, 28 July 2013

Michael Moore is a Scottish former professional footballer, who played in the Scottish Football League First Division for three clubs and is best known for his scoring record at Stranraer.

== Career ==
Moore began his career with Hamilton Academical, and scored on his debut as a seventeen-year-old against Hibernian in a First Division match in November 1998. With Hamilton dogged by financial problems which eventually led to their relegation to the Third Division, Moore joined Stranraer in July 2002.

Moore was SPFA Third Division Player of the Year in 2003–04, a season in which he equalled Derek Frye's record as Stranraer's top scorer in a season with twenty seven goals. This prolific form earned him a £35,000 move back to full-time football with St Johnstone in 2004, but he returned to Stranraer the following year for the same fee. He later played for Ayr United and Dumbarton before heading back to Stranraer for a third and final time in June 2009, having spent the end of the previous season there on loan.

Moore indicated his wish to leave Stranraer at the end of the 2012–2013 season and ended his time with the club having scored ninety four times in two hundred and eighty-eight appearances.

He joined Junior club Kilbirnie Ladeside in July 2013, teaming up with former Stranraer teammates Mark Crilly and Stephen Swift. He became assistant manager to Swift at Lowland Football League side BSC Glasgow in 2017.
