= The Spartans F.C. =

Association football club in Edinburgh, Scotland

The Spartans
- Full name: The Spartans Football Club
- Short name: Spartans
- Founded: 1951; 75 years ago
- Ground: Ainslie Park, Edinburgh
- Capacity: 3,612 (534 seated)
- Coordinates: 55.971554°N 3.233122°W
- Chairman: Craig Graham
- Head coach: James Craigen
- League: Scottish League Two
- 2025–26: Scottish League Two, 2nd of 10
- Website: www.spartansfc.com
Home colours	Away colours

The Spartans Football Club, often known simply as Spartans, are a Scottish football club based in the Pilton area of Edinburgh, Scotland. They currently compete in Scottish League Two. They were formed in 1951 by ex-players of Edinburgh University, the original intention being that the squad would consist exclusively of the university's graduates. However, the club is now open to players of any background. Spartans play at Ainslie Park and wear white shirts, red shorts and white socks.

The senior team plays in Scottish League Two, and were managed by Douglas Samuel from 2012–2026. The Spartans joined the Lowland Football League in 2013 after playing in the East of Scotland Football League, where it had become one of its most successful clubs from the 1970s onwards. Spartans have been allowed to play in the qualifying rounds of the Scottish Cup since 1978 and qualified for the cup proper on several occasions during their junior days. In 2023, Spartans were promoted to Scottish League Two after defeating Albion Rovers in the play-offs.

Spartans entered their top amateur side into the SJFA East Region junior setup in 2009, but withdrew in 2013. Spartans also have an Under-20 squad in the Lowlands U20s Development League, a Saturday amateur side, a Sunday amateur side and several women's teams, including The Spartans W.F.C.

Spartans chairman Craig Graham was appointed MBE in 2017 for his service to the community of North Edinburgh.

== Foundation and early history (1951–1976) ==
The Spartans Football Club was established by two former Edinburgh University players, Elliot Wardlaw and Jimmy Beaumont, in the summer of 1951 and immediately joined the East of Scotland League. The club was originally formed for former university and college footballers but the constitution now allows “other interested parties” to join.

In the 1971–72 season, Spartans won the East of Scotland League championship for the first time in its history.

In 1976 the club became full members of the Scottish Football Association. At this time the club also moved into its new City Park home as tenants of Edinburgh City Council. City Park was situated on Ferry Road approximately 500 yards from Crewe Toll in the north of Edinburgh. The move to City Park also coincided with Spartans participating in the Scottish Qualifying Cup which it won for the first time in 1978.

== East of Scotland Football League (1951–2013) ==
The Spartans have played in the East of Scotland League for the majority of their history where they enjoyed huge success and won their first championship title in the 1971–72 season. The club went on to win a total of 9 East of Scotland League championships and finished runners up in the league 7 times.

The East of Scotland League also provides the opportunity for its clubs to compete in several cup competitions throughout the season. Despite Spartans eventually moving on to the Lowland League in 2013 and then gaining promotion to the SPFL in 2023, they still maintain eligibility to play in the East of Scotland Qualifying Cup which gives them the opportunity to play in the East of Scotland Cup as well (also known as the City Cup).

Spartans have lifted the East of Scotland Qualifying Cup 10 times and subsequently the East of Scotland Cup 3 times. On top of these achievements, they have also lifted the East of Scotland League Cup on 4 occasions.

In November 2008, Spartans moved to a new purpose-built home at Ainslie Park, which was in close proximity to City Park. The new facility included a 504-seater stand and floodlights surrounding the main stadium pitch and an adjacent, full size artificial pitch with floodlights. Ainslie Park is now used daily by youth and adult Spartans teams, along with the general public.

Later that year, Spartans, along with four other clubs, submitted an application for entry into the Scottish Football League following Gretna relinquishing their league status on 3 June 2008. Spartans were unsuccessful and lost out to Annan Athletic remaining in the East of Scotland League.

In the 2009–10 season, Spartans won the quadruple, consisting of the East of Scotland Premier Division, the SFA South Challenge Cup, the King Cup and the League Cup. The 2009–10 league title gave Spartans back to back title wins for the first time since 2005.

During the 2010–11 season, Spartans won their third league title in a row. It was also their third SFA South Challenge Cup final win in a row as they defeated rivals Edinburgh City 3–0, thanks to a goal from Chris Malin and a brace from Omar Kader at Tynecastle Park.

The next season they lost the league title on goal difference to Stirling University, while in the 2012–13 season, they finished third.

== Lowland Football League (2013–2023) ==
Spartans joined the newly formed Lowland Football League for the 2013–14 season and went on to win the inaugural championship title pipping Stirling University by four points.

They finished as runners-up in 2015–16 and missed out on the first ever Pyramid play-off to give clubs are opportunity at promotion to the SPFL. The club went on to win the Lowland League Cup a year later in the 2016–17 season but finished third during their league campaign.

In the 2017–18 season, Spartans were crowned Lowland League champions for a second time. This title victory meant the club would take part in the Pyramid play-off with an opportunity at SPFL promotion, however they lost 5–2 on aggregate to Cove Rangers of the Highland League.

In the 2022–23 season, Spartans won the Lowland League title for a third time ahead of Rangers and Celtic B. During that season's Pyramid play-offs they beat Highland League champions Brechin City 4–3 on penalties before defeating Albion Rovers 2–1 on aggregate in the final to progress to the SPFL and Scottish League Two. The decisive goal was scored from the penalty spot by Blair Henderson at Cliftonville Stadium in a 1-0 win.

In the weeks following Spartans promotion victory, they went on to win the SFA South Challenge Cup for the fourth time at Broadwood Stadium, beating Drumchapel United 2–1. Forward Cammy Russell bagged a brace to complete a historic season for the club.

== Scottish Professional Football League (2023–present) ==
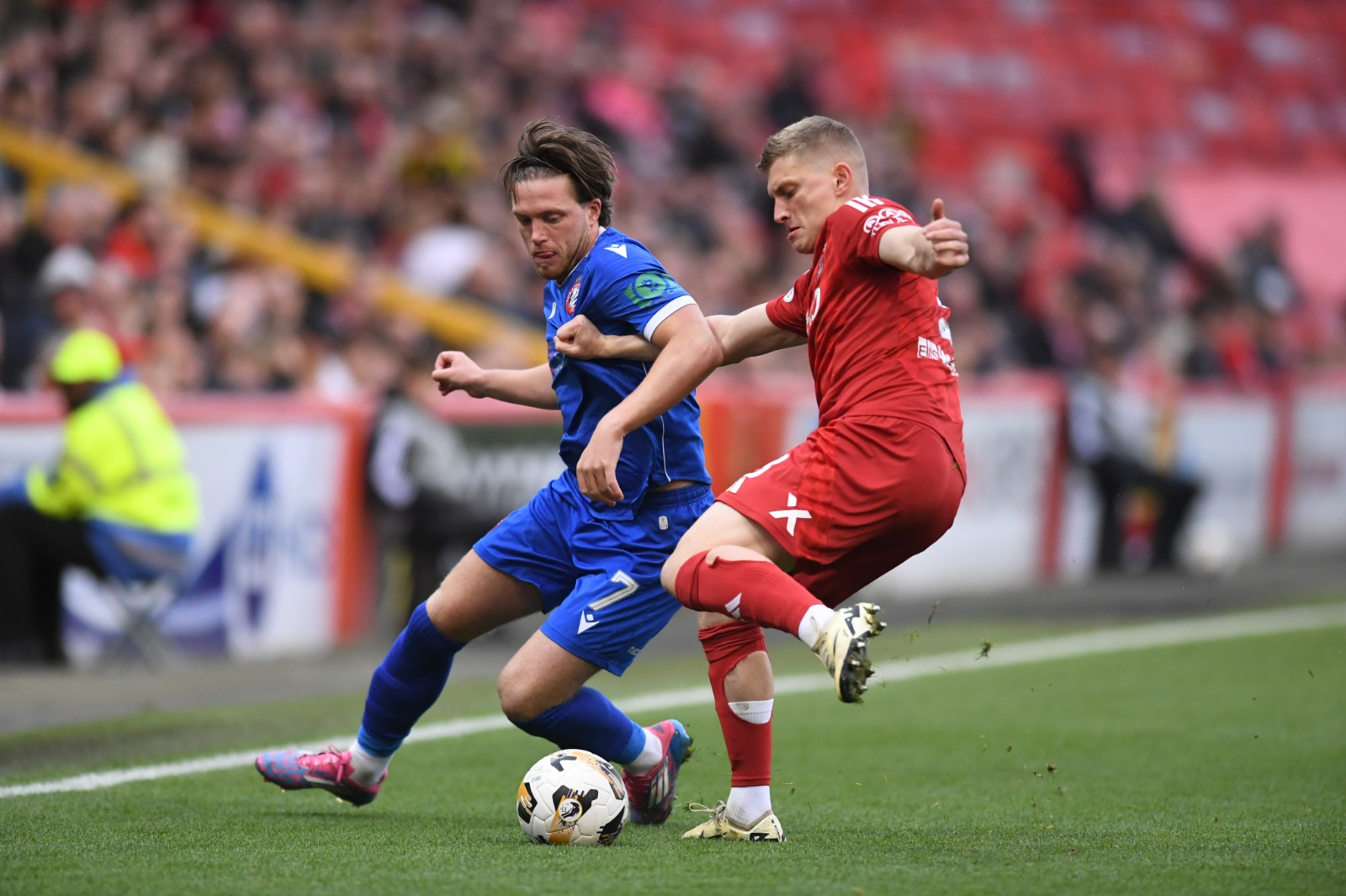
Jamie Dishington (left) of The Spartans in a match against Aberdeen in September 2024

Following promotion to the SPFL and into League Two, Spartans went on to have a very successful first season in 2023–24. In their first competitive game as an SPFL side, they defeated Dundee United at Ainslie Park 1–0 in the Scottish League Cup group stages with Blair Henderson scoring the winner. Their first SPFL league goal was scored by Jamie Dishington in a 1-1 home draw with Clyde.

Spartans would finish third in their debut season, only 10 points less than eventual winners Stenhousemuir. This earned them a play-off place at the first time of asking, and the opportunity for back-to-back promotions into SPFL League One. Having beaten Peterhead to qualify for the final, they would suffer defeat at the hands of Dumbarton, 4–3 on aggregate.

In the 2024–25 League Two season, the goal for Spartans was solidifying their status within the SPFL. They finished in fifth place and narrowly missed out on another play-off opportunity. Highlights during the season were two victories over Edinburgh City at Ainslie Park, and defeating both Livingston away in the League Cup group stages 1–0, and Premiership side Ross County at home in the knock-out stages, also 1–0. Eventually, Spartans were knocked out in the quarter-finals away to Aberdeen at Pittodrie Stadium.

Spartans finished runners-up in League Two in the 2025–26 season. Despite a close title race with newly promoted East Kilbride, they lost out in the final game of the season. In the promotion play-offs, they lost to 3rd placed Clyde 3–1 on aggregate.

== Scottish Cup ==
The Spartans' most successful Scottish Cup run was in 2003–04, when they defeated Buckie Thistle 6–1 in front of a crowd of 450 in Edinburgh in the first round, before defeating Alloa Athletic 5–3 in a replay (the first game had been drawn 3–3) in Edinburgh in the second round. They then defeated Arbroath (who had been in the SFL First Division only the year before) 4–1 at Gayfield Park in the third round, before being beaten 4–0 at home by Scottish Premier League team Livingston in front of a full house of 3,000 fans at City Park.

Two seasons later in 2005–06, Spartans defeated Berwick Rangers, Lossiemouth and Queen's Park in the first three rounds of the Scottish Cup. They drew 0–0 with First Division side St Mirren in the last sixteen in front of 3,326 fans at City Park, earning a replay at Love Street, where they lost 3–0.

In the 2008–09 Scottish Cup, Spartans' cup run sent them to Pollok, winning through a replay, they then beat Annan Athletic 2–1. In the next round they beat Elgin City 2–1, before being knocked out by Airdrie United in the fourth round.

The club progressed to the fifth round (last 16) of the 2014–15 Scottish Cup, defeating Clyde and Morton along the way. In the fifth round of the competition, Spartans forced a replay with Berwick Rangers on 7 February 2015, thanks to an injury time equaliser from Ally MacKinnon to level the tie at 1–1, the game being played in front of 2,504 supporters at Ainslie Park. Spartans lost the replay 1–0.

In the 2023–24 Scottish Cup, Spartans defeated Brechin City 2–1 at Glebe Park before beating Scottish Championship side Arbroath at home 2–1. This set up a cup tie against fellow Edinburgh side Heart of Midlothian at a sold out Ainslie Park. Despite a valiant effort, Spartans would lose the game 2–1 with Hearts scoring the winner in the dying moments. The game is remembered for a spectacular strike from Spartans midfielder James Craigen which brought the game back to 1–1.

Spartans continued their 2025–26 Scottish Cup run with victories over East Kilbride and Bonnyrigg Rose, before defeating former winners Inverness Caledonian Thistle on penalties at Ainslie Park. They then faced Dundee United F.C. at Tannadice Park in the fifth round, losing 2–1.

== Stadium ==
Ainslie Park, on Pilton Drive in northern Edinburgh, is the home ground of The Spartans following their move from City Park. The stadium has a capacity of 3,612, 504 of which are seated. Ainslie Park is only part of the project that Spartans have invested into their ground, with a wider development of the Spartans Community Football Academy as well.

The facility incorporates a fully enclosed stadium which meets SFA and SPFL criteria, with an artificial pitch and floodlights. Another full size, floodlit artificial pitch sits adjacent to the main playing area and the accommodation incorporates six changing rooms, a club room, committee room and a physio room. The club ground holds a P.A system and a bar for spectators.

In March 2017, Edinburgh City reached an agreement with Spartans to use Ainslie Park ground for three seasons while Meadowbank Stadium was being redeveloped.

== Rivalry ==
The Spartans main rivals are Edinburgh City. The two teams compete in the Edinburgh Derby which was closely contested during their spells in both the East of Scotland Football League and the Lowland Football League when it was founded in 2013.

Edinburgh City gained promotion to the SPFL in the 2015–16 Lowland League season meaning there were no fixtures between the sides for a number of years. The derby recommenced when Spartans achieved promotion at the end the 2022–23 season. Prior to this, Edinburgh City became tenants of Spartans at Ainslie Park for several years during the re-development of Meadowbank Stadium.

Without much to separate the sides in recent years, Spartans have had a slight advantage with more wins during the SPFL era, the highlight of which being a Mark Stowe hat-trick in a 3–1 win over City on 27 December 2025 at Meadowbank Stadium.

== Senior squad ==
As of 18 September 2026

Note: Flags indicate national team as defined under FIFA eligibility rules; some limited exceptions apply. Players may hold more than one non-FIFA nationality.

No.	Pos.	Nation	Player
1	GK	SCO	Blair Carswell
2	DF	SCO	Matthew Mudie (on loan from Dundee United)
4	MF	SCO	Sean Welsh
5	DF	SCO	Jordan Tapping
6	MF	SCO	Bailey Dall
7	MF	SCO	Jamie Dishington
9	FW	SCO	Marc McNulty
10	MF	SCO	Mackenzie Ross
11	FW	SCO	Cammy Russell
12	DF	SCO	Aaron Thomson (co-operation loan with Motherwell)
14	FW	IRL	Ricardo Dinanga (on loan from Shrewsbury Town)

No.	Pos.	Nation	Player
15	DF	SCO	Ayrton Sonkur (captain)
16	DF	SCO	David McKay
18	MF	SCO	Brogan Walls
19	DF	SCO	Ethan Drysdale
20	MF	SCO	Zander McAllister (co-operation loan with Motherwell)
21	GK	SCO	Paddy Martin
22	MF	SCO	Oscar Fitzsimmons
23	DF	SCO	Ben Heal
28	MF	ENG	James Craigen
29	FW	SCO	Mark Stowe
33	MF	SCO	Bradley Whyte

=== On loan ===
Note: Flags indicate national team as defined under FIFA eligibility rules; some limited exceptions apply. Players may hold more than one non-FIFA nationality.

No.	Pos.	Nation	Player
—	MF	SCO	Harvey Chisholm (on loan at Dunbar United)
—	MF	SCO	James Mulholland (on loan at Edinburgh University)

No.	Pos.	Nation	Player
—	MF	SCO	Archie Wylie (on loan at Civil Service Strollers)

== Coaching staff ==
Position	Name
Sporting director	(Finland) Mixu Paatelainen
Head coach	(England) James Craigen
Assistant head coach	(Scotland) Paul Thomson
First team coaches	(Scotland) Chris Anderson (Antigua and Barbuda) Aaron Taylor-Sinclair
Goalkeeping coach	(Scotland) Steve Ellison
Physiotherapist	(Scotland) Sophie Marr
Kit manager	(Scotland) Ralph Buchanan

== Notable players and staff ==
=== Internationalists ===
Former Scotland international Eamonn Bannon played for the club late on in his career between 1997–1999. Bannan was capped 11 times for Scotland and went on to coach Spartans when he stopped playing.

Current Spartans forward Marc McNulty, who is in his second spell with the club, is also a former Scotland internationalist having played twice for his country.

=== Dougie Samuel ===
Dougie Samuel is The Spartans most decorated manager having taken the helm in June 2012. In his first game in charge he led Spartans to a 3–0 victory over Coldstream in the East of Scotland Qualifying League.

Over the course of Samuel's reign Spartans have won several honours including three Lowland League championships, the SFA South Challenge Cup and the Lowland League Cup. On top of the trophy successes during his tenure, arguably Samuel's biggest achievement was getting the club promoted to the SPFL in the 2022–23 season via the Pyramid play-offs.

The club announced that Samuel would take an extended leave of absence on 6 September 2026 with no indication of when he would return. On 19 September, it was announced that he had departed the club permanently following an internal investigation.

Samuel's Managerial record:

Name	From	To	M	W	D	L	Win %
(Scotland) Douglas Samuel	June 2012	September 2026	619	351	100	168	56.70

Key

- M = matches played; W = matches won; D = matches drawn; L = matches lost; Win % = percentage of total matches won
- Record runs up to 6 September when original leave of absence was announced.

=== Ronnie Swann ===
Ronnie Swan was known as "Mr Spartans," serving the club for over six decades as a player, club captain and secretary for 30 years. Joining shortly after the club's 1951 formation, he was instrumental in its foundation and growth, with a Challenge Cup now named in his honour.

== Top Scorers (SPFL) ==
	Player	Goals
1	(Scotland) Mark Stowe	47
2	(Scotland) Blair Henderson	44
3	(Scotland) Cammy Russell	41
4	(Scotland) Marc McNulty	27
5	(Scotland) Bradley Whyte	17

- At 15/11/2026

== Women's football ==
Spartans Football Club Women's and Girls plays in the Scottish Women's Premier League, the top division of women's football in Scotland. They play and train at the club's Ainslie Park facilities.

== Honours ==
=== League ===
Scottish League Two

- Runners-up: 2025–26

Lowland Football League

- Winners (3): 2013–14, 2017–18, 2022–23
- Runners-up: 2015–16

East of Scotland Football League

- Winners (9): 1971–72, 1983–84, 1996–97, 2001–02, 2003–04, 2004–05, 2008–09, 2009–10, 2010–11
- Runners-up (7): 1977–78, 1984–85, 1992–93, 1997–98, 1998–99, 2006–07, 2011–12

=== Cup ===
SFA South Region Challenge Cup

- Winners (4): 2008–09, 2009–10, 2010–11, 2022–23

Lowland Football League Cup

- Winners: 2016–17

East of Scotland Football League Cup

- Winners (4): 2003–04, 2004–05, 2009–10, 2010–11

=== Other ===
East of Scotland Qualifying Cup

- Winners (10): 1983–84, 1989–90, 1995–96, 1997–98, 2001–02, 2005–06, 2006–07, 2010–11, 2016–17, 2018–19

East of Scotland City Cup

- Winners (3): 2004–05, 2005–06, 2006–07

East of Scotland King Cup

- Winners (12): 1973–74, 1977–78, 1987–88, 2000–01, 2001–02, 2002–03, 2004–05, 2005–06, 2007–08, 2009–10, 2010–11, 2012–13

Ronnie Swan Challenge Cup

- Winners (2): 2009, 2015

== See also ==
- Foot-Ball Club
