= Douglas Samuel =

Scottish football coach

Personal information
- Date of birth: 1 October 1966 (age 60)

Team information
- Current team: The Spartans

Managerial career
- Years: Team
- 2003–2012: Edinburgh University
- 2012–2026: The Spartans

Douglas Samuel MBE (born 1 October 1966) is a Scottish football coach who was most recently manager of The Spartans.

== Career ==
In the 2022–23 season, Spartans won the Lowland League title for a third time. During that season's Pyramid play-offs they defeated Highland League champions Brechin City 4–3 on penalties before defeating Albion Rovers 2–1 on aggregate in the final to progress to Scottish League Two.

He won the Scottish League Two Manager of the Month Award in August 2023, October 2023, and was awarded an MBE in 2022 for services to association football and the community of North Edinburgh.
