= Scottish League Two =

Association football league in Scotland

- Founded: 2013; 13 years ago
- Country: Scotland (10 teams)
- Confederation: UEFA
- Number of clubs: 10
- Level on pyramid: 4
- Promotion to: Scottish League One
- Relegation to: Highland Football League; Lowland Football League (play-off)
- Domestic cup: Scottish Cup
- League cup(s): Scottish League Cup; Scottish Challenge Cup
- Current champions: East Kilbride (1st title) (Note: Scottish League Two has only existed since 2013. For a complete record of clubs that have won the Scottish fourth tier, see List of winners of the Scottish League Two and predecessors.) (2025–26)
- Most championships: Peterhead (3 titles)
- Broadcaster(s): BBC Alba
- Website: spfl.co.uk
- Current: 2026–27 Scottish League Two

The Scottish League Two, known as William Hill League Two for sponsorship reasons, is the fourth tier of the Scottish Professional Football League, the league competition for men's professional football clubs in Scotland. The Scottish League Two was established in July 2013, after the Scottish Professional Football League was formed by a merger of the Scottish Premier League and Scottish Football League.

Since the 2014–15 season, the bottom team has entered a play-off against the winner of a play-off between the winners of the Highland and Lowland Leagues for a place in the following season's competition.

== Format ==
Teams receive three points for a win and one point for a draw. No points are awarded for a loss. Teams are ranked by total points, then goal difference, and then goals scored. At the end of each season, the club with the most points is crowned league champion. If points are equal, the goal difference determines the winner. If this still does not result in a winner, the tied teams must take part in a playoff game at a neutral venue to determine the final placings.

=== Promotion and relegation ===
The champions are directly promoted to the Scottish League One, swapping places with the bottom club of League One. The clubs finishing 2nd, 3rd, 4th in League Two, and the 9th placed team in League One then enter the two-legged League One play-off. The 2nd-placed League Two club plays the 3rd-placed League Two club, whilst the team who finished 4th in League Two will play the 9th-placed League One side. The winners of these ties will then play each other. If a League Two play-off winner prevails, that club is promoted, with the League One club being relegated. If the League One side is victorious, they then retain their place in League One.

Since season 2014–15, the bottom team in League Two enters a two-legged play-off against the winner of the Pyramid play-off between the Highland League and Lowland League champions. If the Highland or Lowland team wins the final they are promoted to League Two, and the team finishing 10th is relegated to the regional league they have chosen prior to the start of the season (previously this depended on whether they were north or south of 56.4513N latitude). If the League Two side wins the play-off, they retain their place in the following season's competition.

The following League Two play-off finals have been played:

Season	Winning team	Aggregate score	Losing team	Losing semi-finalist
2014–15	Montrose	3–2	Brora Rangers	Edinburgh City
2015–16	Edinburgh City (P)	2–1	East Stirlingshire (R)	Cove Rangers
2016–17	Cowdenbeath	1–1 (p)	East Kilbride	Buckie Thistle
2017–18	Cowdenbeath	3–2	Cove Rangers	The Spartans
2018–19	Cove Rangers (P)	7–0	Berwick Rangers (R)	East Kilbride
2019–20	No playoffs were held due to the COVID-19 pandemic			
2020–21	Kelty Hearts (P)	3–1	Brechin City (R)	Brora Rangers
2021–22	Bonnyrigg Rose Athletic (P)	4–0	Cowdenbeath (R)	Fraserburgh
2022–23	The Spartans (P)	2–1	Albion Rovers (R)	Brechin City
2023–24	Stranraer	5–3 (aet)	East Kilbride	None (Note: Buckie Thistle won the 2023–24 Highland Football League but did not hold the required SFA Bronze licence to compete in the SPFL. As a result, the play-off semi-final was cancelled and East Kilbride advanced automatically to the play-off final.)
2024–25	East Kilbride (P)	3–1	Bonnyrigg Rose (R)	Brora Rangers
2025–26	Edinburgh City	3–1	Brora Rangers	None (Note: Linlithgow Rose won the 2025–26 Lowland Football League but did not hold the required SFA Bronze licence to compete in the SPFL. As a result, the play-off semi-final was cancelled and Brora Rangers advanced automatically to the play-off final.)

(P) Promoted; (R) Relegated

== Teams ==
Listed below are all the teams competing in the 2024–25 Scottish League Two season, with details of the first season they entered the fourth tier; the first season of their current spell in the fourth tier; and the last time they won the fourth tier.

Team	Position in 2025–26	First season in fourth tier	First season of current spell in fourth tier	Last title (4th tier)
Kelty Hearts	10th, Scottish League One (relegated)	2021–22	2026–27	2021–22
Clyde	3rd, Scottish League Two	2010–11	2023–24	—
Annan Athletic	7th, Scottish League Two	2008–09	2025–26	—
Edinburgh City	10th, Scottish League Two	2016–17	2024–25	—
Elgin City	6th, Scottish League Two	2000–01	2000–01	—
Forfar Athletic	4th, Scottish League Two	1994–95	2021–22	1994–95
Dumbarton	9th, Scottish League Two	1997-98	2025–26	2008-09
Stirling Albion	8th, Scottish League Two	2001–02	2024–25	2022–23
Stranraer	5th, Scottish League Two	2003–04	2020–21	2003–04
The Spartans	2nd, Scottish League Two	2023–24	2023–24	—

== Stadiums ==
Annan Athletic	Clyde	Dumbarton	Edinburgh City	Elgin City
Galabank	New Douglas Park	Dumbarton Football Stadium	Meadowbank Stadium	Borough Briggs
Capacity: 2,504	Capacity: 6,018	Capacity: 2,020	Capacity: 1,280	Capacity: 4,520

Forfar Athletic	Kelty Hearts	Stirling Albion	Stranraer	The Spartans
Station Park	New Central Park	Forthbank Stadium	Stair Park	Ainslie Park
Capacity: 6,777	Capacity: 2,181	Capacity: 3,808	Capacity: 4,178	Capacity: 3,612

== Statistics ==
=== Championships ===
Season	Winner	Runner-up	Top scorer	
Season	Winner	Runner-up	Player	Goals
2013–14	Peterhead	Annan Athletic	Rory McAllister (Peterhead)	32
2014–15	Albion Rovers	Queen's Park	Peter Weatherson (Annan Athletic)	22
2015–16	East Fife	Elgin City	Nathan Austin (East Fife)	22
2016–17	Arbroath	Forfar Athletic	Shane Sutherland (Elgin City)	18
2017–18	Montrose	Peterhead	David Goodwillie (Clyde)	25
2018–19	Peterhead	Clyde	Blair Henderson (Edinburgh City)	30
2019–20	Cove Rangers	Edinburgh City	Mitch Megginson (Cove Rangers)	24
2020–21	Queen's Park	Edinburgh City	Kane Hester (Elgin City)	15
2021–22	Kelty Hearts	Forfar Athletic	Nathan Austin (Kelty Hearts)	17
2022–23	Stirling Albion	Dumbarton	Tommy Goss (Annan Athletic)	23
2023–24	Stenhousemuir	Peterhead	Blair Henderson (The Spartans)	18
2024–25	Peterhead	East Fife	Alan Trouten (East Fife)	22
2025–26	East Kilbride	The Spartans	Mark Stowe (The Spartans)	21

=== Top goalscorers ===
As of 29 September 2023

Rank	Player	Club(s) (Note: Clubs only include those where players scored goals in the Scottish League Two.)	Goals
1	**Blair Henderson**	Annan Athletic (2014), (2017–2018); Berwick Rangers (2015–2016); Stirling Albion (2016–2017); Edinburgh City (2018–2021); The Spartans (2023–)	87
2	Shane Sutherland	Elgin City (2013–2015; 2016–2019); Peterhead (2019); Elgin City (2019–2020)	75
3	**Rory McAllister**	Peterhead (2013–2014; 2017–2019); Cove Rangers (2020); Peterhead (2023–)	70
4	Kane Hester	Arbroath (2015–2017); Elgin City (2019–2023)	63
5	**Brian Cameron**	Elgin City (2013–)	59

Italics denotes players still playing football,
Bold denotes players still playing in Scottish League Two.
