= 2005–06 Dumbarton F.C. season =

Dumbarton
2005-06 season
- Manager: Paul Martin
- Stadium: Strathclyde Homes Stadium, Dumbarton
- Scottish League Division 2: 10th
- Scottish Cup: Second Round
- Scottish League Cup: First Round
- Bell's Challenge Cup: Second Round
- Top goalscorer: League: Andy Rodgers (12); All: Andy Rodgers (16)
- Highest home attendance: 1,594
- Lowest home attendance: 534
- Average home league attendance: 939

Season 2005–06 was the 122nd football season in which Dumbarton competed at a Scottish national level, entering the Scottish Football League for the 100th time, the Scottish Cup for the 111th time, the Scottish League Cup for the 59th time and the Scottish Challenge Cup for the 15th time.

== Overview ==
Paul Martin's first full season in charge was not to be a happy one. The league campaign did not start well with only 1 win recorded from the first 9 matches. There was a temporary improvement in results from mid October to mid November, but thereafter success was hard to come by, and from February onwards just 2 draws were salvaged from 13 league encounters, meaning that Dumbarton would be anchored at the bottom of the table and relegation was assured long before the season's end. It also meant the end of Paul Martin's tenure in the manager's seat.

In the Scottish Cup, a first round win over Highland League opponents Forres Mechanics was followed by an embarrassing defeat to Third Division Arbroath.

In the League Cup, it was another first round exit, this time to Hamilton.

Finally, in the Scottish Challenge Cup, Dumbarton's dismal record in this competition was extended by a further year with a second round defeat to Raith Rovers.

Locally, in the Stirlingshire Cup, Dumbarton lost both of their opening group ties, and failed to score too.

Despite the disappointing end, the season had in fact started brightly with an invite to the pre-season Keyline Tournament run by Oban Saints. This was duly won, with 3 wins and 2 draws from 5 matches, against strong opposition including Hearts, Dundee United and St Johnstone.

== Results & fixtures ==
Win Draw Loss

=== Scottish Second Division ===
6 August 2005 Scottish Second Division	Ayr United	2–0	Dumbarton	Somerset Park
	Boyd 17'; Wardlaw 74'	BBC Report		Attendance: 1,274; Referee: W Collum

13 August 2005 Scottish Second Division	Dumbarton	1–1	Alloa Athletic	Dumbarton Football Stadium
	Walker 90'	BBC Report	Sloan 61'	Attendance: 879; Referee: C Boyle

20 August 2005 Scottish Second Division	Partick Thistle	3–2	Dumbarton	Firhill Stadium
	Roberts 26', 62'; Santala 69'	BBC Report	Smith 8'; McQuilken 12'	Attendance: 2,354; Referee: I Fyfe

27 August 2005 Scottish Second Division	Dumbarton	1–1	Morton	Dumbarton Football Stadium
	Russell 85' (pen.)	BBC Report	Weatherston 88'	Attendance: 1,574; Referee: I Fyfe

10 September 2005 Scottish Second Division	Peterhead	1–0	Dumbarton	Balmoor Stadium
	Shand 63'	BBC Report		Attendance: 494; Referee: E Smith

17 September 2005 Scottish Second Division	Forfar Athletic	2–0	Dumbarton	Station Park, Forfar
	Gribben 6'; Dunn 64'	BBC Report		Attendance: 429; Referee: S Finnie

24 September 2005 Scottish Second Division	Dumbarton	2–0	Stirling Albion	Dumbarton Football Stadium
	Rodgers 14', 83'	BBC Report		Attendance: 877; Referee: I Brines

1 October 2005 Scottish Second Division	Gretna	1–0	Dumbarton	Raydale Park
	Tosh 4'	BBC Report		Attendance: 965

15 October 2005 Scottish Second Division	Dumbarton	1–2	Raith Rovers	Dumbarton Football Stadium
	Gemmell 81'	BBC Report	Ellis 4'; McLeod 64'	Attendance: 652; Referee: S Conroy

22 October 2005 Scottish Second Division	Dumbarton	6–0	Ayr United	Dumbarton Football Stadium
	Gaughan 4'; Rodgers 34' (pen.), 76'; Dillon 63'; Smith 86'; Russell 87'	BBC Report		Attendance: 917; Referee: C Allan

25 October 2005 Scottish Second Division	Alloa Athletic	1–4	Dumbarton	Recreation Park, Alloa
	Brown 86'	BBC Report	Gentile 1'; Dillon 33'; Russell 53'Connell 80'	Attendance: 469; Referee: C Melville

29 October 2005 Scottish Second Division	Dumbarton	1–0	Peterhead	Dumbarton Football Stadium
	Boyle 87'	BBC Report		Attendance: 771; Referee: I Fyfe

5 November 2005 Scottish Second Division	Morton	4–0	Dumbarton	Cappielow
	McLaren 1'; Lilley 7', 84'; Weatherston 86'	BBC Report		Attendance: 2,818; Referee: B Winter

12 November 2005 Scottish Second Division	Dumbarton	2–0	Forfar Athletic	Dumbarton Football Stadium
	Rodgers 9'; McQuilken 29'	BBC Report		Attendance: 717; Referee: W Collum

3 December 2005 Scottish Second Division	Raith Rovers	3–2	Dumbarton	Starks Park
	Jablonski 25'; McManus 32'; Davidson 77'	BBC Report	Rodgers 39', 45'	Attendance: 1,060; Referee: E Smith

7 December 2005 Scottish Second Division	Stirling Albion	0–0	Dumbarton	Forthbank Stadium
		BBC Report		Attendance: 520; Referee: C Conroy

17 December 2005 Scottish Second Division	Dumbarton	0–1	Gretna	Dumbarton Football Stadium
		BBC Report	Grady 29'	Attendance: 839; Referee: I Fyfe

26 December 2005 Scottish Second Division	Ayr United	2–0	Dumbarton	Somerset Park
	Conway 26'; Ramsay 31'	BBC Report		Attendance: 1,266

31 December 2005 Scottish Second Division	Dumbarton	1–2	Partick Thistle	Dumbarton Football Stadium
	Borris 4'	BBC Report	Santala 27'; McCulloch 39' (pen.)	Attendance: 1,562; Referee: D Somers

2 January 2006 Scottish Second Division	Dumbarton	0–2	Morton	Dumbarton Football Stadium
		BBC Report	Lilley 22'; Weatherston 50'	Attendance: 1,594

14 January 2006 Scottish Second Division	Peterhead	3–1	Dumbarton	Balmoor Stadium
	Gibson 33'; Wood 55'; Sharp 72'	BBC Report	Gemmell 69'	Attendance: 705; Referee: S Duff

21 January 2006 Scottish Second Division	Forfar Athletic	2–3	Dumbarton	Station Park, Forfar
	Cameron 8'; Forrest 81'	BBC Report	Russell 59' (pen.); Gemmell 86'; Dubourdeau 90' (OG)	Attendance: 481; Referee: C Hardie

28 January 2006 Scottish Second Division	Dumbarton	3–2	Stirling Albion	Dumbarton Football Stadium
	Russell 18', 75'; Gemmell 27'	BBC Report	Aitken 45'; Devine 63'	Attendance: 891; Referee: C Boyle

11 February 2006 Scottish Second Division	Dumbarton	0–1	Raith Rovers	Dumbarton Football Stadium
		BBC Report	McManus 48'	Attendance: 812; Referee: A Muir

7 March 2006 Scottish Second Division	Gretna	3–0	Dumbarton	Raydale Park
	Grady 22'; McGuffie 50'; Deuchar 62'	BBC Report		Attendance: 598; Referee: S Conroy

11 March 2006 Scottish Second Division	Dumbarton	2–3	Peterhead	Dumbarton Football Stadium
	Russell 10' (pen.); Rodgers 12'	BBC Report	Gibson 40'; Linn 70', 86'	Attendance: 628; Referee: W Collum

14 March 2006 Scottish Second Division	Partick Thistle	2–1	Dumbarton	Firhill Stadium
	Roberts 25'; McConalogue 63'	BBC Report	Boyle 90'	Attendance: 1,538; Referee: C Allan

18 March 2006 Scottish Second Division	Dumbarton	0–0	Forfar Athletic	Dumbarton Football Stadium
		BBC Report		Attendance: 616; Referee: M Sproule

21 March 2006 Scottish Second Division	Dumbarton	0–1	Alloa Athletic	Dumbarton Football Stadium
		BBC Report	Stevenson 76'	Attendance: 534; Referee: I Frickleton

25 March 2006 Scottish Second Division	Stirling Albion	3–1	Dumbarton	Forthbank Stadium
	Connelly 68'; O'Brien 72'; Trialist 86'	BBC Report	Russell 87'	Attendance: 604; Referee: A Hunter

28 March 2006 Scottish Second Division	Morton	4–0	Dumbarton	Cappielow
	McAllister 19'; Weatherston 52'; Walker, J 73', 74'	BBC Report		Attendance: 1,418; Referee: C Boyle

8 April 2006 Scottish Second Division	Raith Rovers	0–0	Dumbarton	Starks Park
		BBC Report		Attendance: 1,055; Referee: M Ritchie

15 April 2006 Scottish Second Division	Dumbarton	4–5	Ayr United	Dumbarton Football Stadium
	Rodgers 47', 59'; Gemmell 63'; McQuilken 70'	BBC Report	Logan 5'; Strain 10'; Vareille 12'; McAnespie 53'; Robertson 79'	Attendance: 931; Referee: I Fyfe

18 April 2006 Scottish Second Division	Dumbarton	0–2	Gretna	Dumbarton Football Stadium
		BBC Report	McGuffie 11'; Innes 17'	Attendance: 651; Referee: J Downie

22 April 2006 Scottish Second Division	Alloa Athletic	1–0	Dumbarton	Recreation Park, Alloa
	Stevenson 64'	BBC Report		Attendance: 1,055; Referee: C Murray

29 April 2006 Scottish Second Division	Dumbarton	2–3	Partick Thistle	Dumbarton Football Stadium
	Rodgers 40', 41'	BBC Report	McConalogue 55', 87'; Roberts 69'	Attendance: 1,257; Referee: A Muir

=== CIS League Cup ===
9 August 2005 Scottish League Cup round 1	Hamilton	2–1	Dumbarton	New Douglas Park
	Tunbridge 84', 87'	BBC Report	Rodgers 10'	Attendance: 627; Referee: J Underhill

=== Bell's League Challenge Cup ===
30 August 2005 Scottish Challenge Cup round 1	Raith Rovers	2–1 (a.e.t.)	Dumbarton	Starks Park
	Dempsie 112' (OG); McManus 118'	BBC report	Rodgers 98'	Attendance: 1,382; Referee: M McCurry

=== Scottish Cup ===
26 November 2005 Scottish Cup round 1	Dumbarton	4–1	Forres Mechanics	Dumbarton Football Stadium
	Russell 8'; Rodgers 19', 57'; McQuilken 39'	BBC Report	Mackay 35'	Attendance: 755; Referee: S O'Reilly

10 December 2005 Scottish Cup round 2	Arbroath	1–0	Dumbarton	Gayfield Park
	Brazil 16'	BBC Report		Attendance: 596; Referee: C Boyle

=== Stirlingshire Cup ===
16 August 2005 Group stage	Falkirk	4–0	Dumbarton	Falkirk Stadium
	Thomson 5', 46'; Moutinho 10'; O'Donnell 27'			Attendance: 969; Referee: S O'Reilly

23 August 2005 Group stage	Dumbarton	0–1	East Stirlingshire	Dumbarton Football Stadium
			Goal	Attendance: 197

=== Pre-season friendlies ===
2 July 2005 Friendly	Clydebank	0–7	Dumbarton	Clydebank
			Russell; McQuilken; Rodgers

9 July 2005 Friendly	Dumbarton	1–2	Clyde	Dumbarton Football Stadium
	Dillon		Goal

12 July 2005 Friendly	Dumbarton	1–1	St Mirren	Dumbarton Football Stadium
	Russell		Goal

23 July 2005 Friendly	Queen's Park	2–3	Dumbarton	Hampden Park
	Goal		Russell; MacDonald

27 July 2005 Friendly	Pollok	2–2	Dumbarton	Newlandsfield Park
	Goal		Gentile; Gemmell

30 July 2005 Friendly	Dumbarton	1–1	Airdrie United	Dumbarton Football Stadium
	Dillon		Goal

== League table ==
Pos	Team	Pld	W	D	L	GF	GA	GD	Pts	Promotion, qualification or relegation
6	Ayr United	36	10	12	14	56	61	−5	42	
7	Raith Rovers	36	11	9	16	44	54	−10	42	
8	Forfar Athletic	36	12	4	20	44	55	−11	40	
9	Alloa Athletic	36	8	8	20	36	77	−41	32	Qualification for the Second Division Play-offs (Note: The 9th placed team were entered into a play-off with the Third Division's 2nd, 3rd and 4th placed teams. The winning team were awarded a place in the 2006–07 Second Division, Alloa Athletic won the play-off to stay in the division.)
10	Dumbarton (R)	36	7	5	24	40	63	−23	26	Relegation to the 2006–07 Third Division

Source: "2005-2006 Second Division - SPFL Archive". SPFL.
Rules for classification: 1) points; 2) goal difference; 3) number of goals scored.
(R) Relegated

== Player statistics ==
=== Squad ===
No.	Pos	Nat	Player	Total		Second Division		League Cup		Challenge Cup		Scottish Cup	
No.	Pos	Nat	Player	Apps	Goals	Apps	Goals	Apps	Goals	Apps	Goals	Apps	Goals
	GK	(Scotland) SCO	Stephen Grindlay	39	0	36+0	0	0+0	0	1+0	0	2+0	0
	GK	(Scotland) SCO	John Wight	1	0	0+0	0	1+0	0	0+0	0	0+0	0
	DF	(Scotland) SCO	Craig Brittain	12	0	7+3	0	0+0	0	0+0	0	1+1	0
	DF	(Scotland) SCO	Mark Dempsie	26	0	25+0	0	0+0	0	1+0	0	0+0	0
	DF	(Scotland) SCO	Ian Dobbins	1	0	0+0	0	1+0	0	0+0	0	0+0	0
	DF	(Scotland) SCO	Kevin Gaughan	28	1	25+1	1	0+0	0	0+0	0	2+0	0
	DF	(Scotland) SCO	Gary McDevitt	1	0	0+1	0	0+0	0	0+0	0	0+0	0
	DF	(Scotland) SCO	Jamie Smith	36	2	33+0	2	1+0	0	1+0	0	1+0	0
	DF	(Scotland) SCO	Robert Walker	26	1	22+0	1	1+0	0	1+0	0	2+0	0
	DF	(Scotland) SCO	Paul Young	1	0	0+1	0	0+0	0	0+0	0	0+0	0
	MF	(Scotland) SCO	James Allan	6	0	3+1	0	1+0	0	0+0	0	1+0	0
	MF	(Scotland) SCO	Scott Bannerman	25	0	16+7	0	0+0	0	0+1	0	1+0	0
	MF	(Scotland) SCO	Chris Boyle	28	2	26+0	2	0+0	0	0+0	0	2+0	0
	MF	(Scotland) SCO	Graham Connell	29	1	16+11	1	0+0	0	1+0	0	1+0	0
	MF	(Scotland) SCO	John Dillon	25	2	11+12	2	1+0	0	1+0	0	0+0	0
	MF	(Scotland) SCO	Steve Ferguson	11	0	11+0	0	0+0	0	0+0	0	0+0	0
	MF	(Scotland) SCO	Danny Ferry	18	0	10+7	0	0+0	0	0+1	0	0+0	0
	MF	(Scotland) SCO	Chris Gentile	26	1	19+3	1	0+1	0	1+0	0	2+0	0
	MF	(Scotland) SCO	Kevin MacDonald	16	0	7+5	0	1+0	0	1+0	0	0+2	0
	MF	(Scotland) SCO	Craig Winter	12	0	12+0	0	0+0	0	0+0	0	0+0	0
	FW	(Scotland) SCO	Ryan Borris	34	1	30+0	1	1+0	0	1+0	0	2+0	0
	FW	(Scotland) SCO	John Gemmell	27	5	14+12	5	0+0	0	0+0	0	0+1	0
	FW	(Scotland) SCO	David McNaught	3	0	0+3	0	0+0	0	0+0	0	0+0	0
	FW	(Scotland) SCO	Paul McQuilken	38	4	24+10	3	1+0	0	1+0	0	2+0	1
	FW	(Scotland) SCO	Andy Rodgers	37	16	27+6	12	1+0	1	0+1	1	2+0	2
	FW	(Scotland) SCO	Paul Ronald	6	0	2+3	0	1+0	0	0+0	0	0+0	0
	FW	(Scotland) SCO	Iain Russell	34	9	20+10	8	0+1	0	1+0	0	1+1	1

=== Transfers ===
==== Players in ====
Player	From	Date
(Scotland) Danny Ferry	(Scotland) Queen's Park	20 May 2005
(Scotland) Graham Connell	(Scotland) Berwick Rangers	4 Jun 2005
(Scotland) Chris Gentile	(Scotland) Kilsyth Rangers	4 Jul 2005
(Scotland) Paul McQuilken	(Scotland) Kilsyth Rangers	4 Jul 2005
(Scotland) Paul Young	(Scotland) Barrhead BC	4 Jul 2005
(Scotland) Scott Bannerman	(Scotland) Morton	11 Jul 2005
(Scotland) David McNaught	(Scotland) Clyde	13 Jul 2005
(Scotland) Jamie Smith	(Scotland) Brechin City	19 Jul 2005
(Scotland) Kevin MacDonald	(Scotland) Stirling Albion	23 Jul 2005
(Scotland) Kevin Gaughan	(Scotland) Stranraer	31 Aug 2005
(Scotland) Steve Ferguson	(Scotland) Brechin City (loan)	21 Jan 2006
(Scotland) Craig Winter	(Scotland) Brechin City	26 Jan 2006
(Scotland) Gary McDevitt	(Scotland) Partick Thistle	31 Jan 2006

==== Players out ====
Player	To	Date
(Scotland) Barry Donald	(Scotland) Forfar Athletic	27 May 2005
(Scotland) James McKinstry	(Scotland) Ayr United	4 Jun 2005
(Scotland) Eddie Annand	(Scotland) Raith Rovers	28 Jun 2005
(Scotland) Andy Rodgers	(Scotland) Montrose	6 Jul 2005
(Scotland) Craig McEwan	(Scotland) Brechin City	19 Jul 2005
(Scotland) Ian Dobbins	(Scotland) Arbroath	31 Aug 2005
(Scotland) Mark Bradley	(Scotland) Bathgate Thistle	
(Scotland) John Wight	(Scotland) Beith	
(Scotland) Karl Anderson	(Scotland) Kirkintilloch Rob Roy	
(Scotland) Kevin MacDonald	(Scotland) Kirkintilloch Rob Roy	
(Scotland) Gary McDevitt	(Scotland) Vale of Leven	
(Scotland) James Allan		

== Trivia ==
- The League match against Peterhead on 29 October marked Iain Russell's 100th appearance for Dumbarton in all national competitions - the 128th Dumbarton player to reach this milestone.

== See also ==
- 2005–06 in Scottish football
