= 2006–07 Dumbarton F.C. season =

Dumbarton
2006-07 season
- Manager: Gerry McCabe
- Stadium: Strathclyde Homes Stadium, Dumbarton
- Scottish League Division 3: 5th
- Scottish Cup: Third Round
- Scottish League Cup: Second Round
- League Challenge Cup: First Round
- Top goalscorer: League: Stephen Dobbie (10); All: Stephen Dobbie (11)
- Highest home attendance: 1,092
- Lowest home attendance: 521
- Average home league attendance: 715

Season 2006–07 was the 123rd football season in which Dumbarton competed at a Scottish national level, entering the Scottish Football League for the 101st time, the Scottish Cup for the 112th time, the Scottish League Cup for the 60th time and the Scottish Challenge Cup for the 16th time.

== Overview ==
It was hoped that the return to the Third Division would be a short one and that Gerry McCabe would be the manager to help Dumbarton win an immediate promotion. Despite a slow start, by the end of December, Dumbarton were in pole position to claim at least one of the play off places in the league. However, the end of a successful loan spell for the club's top scorer - Stephen Dobbie - coincided with a slump in form and by the end of March a gap had opened up between the top four and the chasing group. Despite a run of 5 consecutive wins in April, 5th place would be the best that could be achieved 8 points adrift of East Fife in 4th.

In the Scottish Cup, an excellent away win over Second Division Raith Rovers was rewarded by a third round tie against Celtic. However it would be the Premier League side that would advance.

In the League Cup, Dumbarton had a decisive win over Second Division Stirling Albion, but it would be another Premier League side, Inverness Caledonian Thistle that would advance after a close fought second round tie.

Finally, it would be 'business as usual' in the League Challenge Cup, with another first hurdle fall, this time to Morton.

Locally, in the Stirlingshire Cup, Dumbarton won one and lost one of their opening group ties, and failed to progress to the final.

== Results & fixtures ==
Win Draw Loss

=== Scottish Third Division ===
5 August 2006 Scottish Third Division	Montrose	1–1	Dumbarton	Links Park
	Henslee 28'	BBC Report	Bagan 36'	Attendance: 404; Referee: S Nicholls

12 August 2006 Scottish Third Division	Dumbarton	2–0	East Stirlingshire	Dumbarton Football Stadium
	Bagan 24'; Quitongo 75'	BBC Report		Attendance: 623; Referee: A Law

19 August 2006 Scottish Third Division	Queen's Park	1–0	Dumbarton	Hampden Park
	Canning 70'	BBC Report		Attendance: 884; Referee: A Muir

26 August 2006 Scottish Third Division	Berwick Rangers	3–0	Dumbarton	Shielfield Park
	Smith 43'; Paliczka 49'; Fraser 73'	BBC Report		Attendance: 465; Referee: A Boyd

3 September 2006 Scottish Third Division	Dumbarton	0–2	Arbroath	Dumbarton Football Stadium
		BBC Report	Sellars 22'; Brazil 42'	Attendance: 710; Referee: S O'Reilly

9 September 2006 Scottish Third Division	Elgin City	0–2	Dumbarton	Borough Briggs
		BBC Report	Dobbie 60'; Dillon 83'	Attendance: 462; Referee: C Brown

16 September 2006 Scottish Third Division	Dumbarton	4–0	Stenhousemuir	Dumbarton Football Stadium
	Winter 23', 85'; Dobbie 36', 48'	BBC Report		Attendance: 902; Referee: C Charleston

23 September 2006 Scottish Third Division	Dumbarton	3–1	Albion Rovers	Dumbarton Football Stadium
	McNaught 23'; Borris 42'; Lennon 46' (OG)	BBC Report	Chisholm 32'	Attendance: 645; Referee: D Somers

30 September 2006 Scottish Third Division	East Fife	1–0	Dumbarton	Bayview Stadium
	Jablonski 39'	BBC Report		Attendance: 671; Referee: A Law

14 October 2006 Scottish Third Division	Dumbarton	1–0	Montrose	Dumbarton Football Stadium
	Dobbie 29' (pen.), 85'	BBC Report		Attendance: 629; Referee: S Nicholls

21 October 2006 Scottish Third Division	East Stirlingshire	0–2	Dumbarton	Firs Park
		BBC Report	Dobbie 13' (pen.); Bagan 55'	Attendance: 395; Referee: S O'Reilly

28 October 2006 Scottish Third Division	Arbroath	0–0	Dumbarton	Gayfield Park
		BBC Report		Attendance: 718; Referee: A Boyd

4 November 2006 Scottish Third Division	Dumbarton	2–0	Berwick Rangers	Dumbarton Football Stadium
	Winter 19'; Hamilton 70'	BBC Report		Attendance: 738; Referee: C Hardie

11 November 2006 Scottish Third Division	Stenhousemuir	1–0	Dumbarton	Ochilview
	McBride 77'	BBC Report		Attendance: 534; Referee: C Brown

25 November 2006 Scottish Third Division	Dumbarton	3–1	Elgin City	Dumbarton Football Stadium
	Borris 47'; Dobbie 62'; Winter 67'	BBC Report	Johnston 89'	Attendance: 709

2 December 2006 Scottish Third Division	Albion Rovers	2–1	Dumbarton	Cliftonhill
	Watson 2'; Chaplain 5'	BBC Report	Borris 46'	Attendance: 504; Referee: C Charleston

16 December 2006 Scottish Third Division	Dumbarton	2–1	East Fife	Dumbarton Football Stadium
	Dobbie 9'; Winter 62'	BBC Report	Jablonski 38'	Attendance: 798

23 December 2006 Scottish Third Division	Montrose	0–5	Dumbarton	Links Park
		BBC Report	Dobbie 34', 82'; Gentile 49', 72'; Hamilton 84'	Attendance: 400; Referee: C Allan

30 December 2006 Scottish Third Division	Dumbarton	0–0	Queen's Park	Dumbarton Football Stadium
		BBC Report		Attendance: 1,089; Referee: S Nicholls

27 January 2007 Scottish Third Division	Elgin City	0–1	Dumbarton	Borough Briggs
		BBC Report	Boyle 43'	Attendance: 484; Referee: A Freeland

3 February 2007 Scottish Third Division	Dumbarton	3–1	Albion Rovers	Dumbarton Football Stadium
	Coyne 20', 48'; Borris 47'	BBC Report	MacFarlane 25'	Attendance: 745; Referee: E Norris

17 February 2007 Scottish Third Division	Queen's Park	2–0	Dumbarton	Hampden Park
	Weatherston 20'; Ferry 57'	BBC Report		Attendance: 849; Referee: A Boyd

24 February 2007 Scottish Third Division	Dumbarton	2–1	East Stirlingshire	Dumbarton Football Stadium
	Coyne 17' (pen.); Gentile 73'	BBC Report	Stewart 37'	Attendance: 729; Referee: C Brown

3 March 2007 Scottish Third Division	Dumbarton	1–2	Berwick Rangers	Dumbarton Football Stadium
	Coyne 21'	BBC Report	Manson 20'; Diack 49'	Attendance: 859; Referee: S O'Reilly

7 March 2007 Scottish Third Division	Berwick Rangers	2–1	Dumbarton	Shielfield Park
	Wood 42'; Haynes 82'	BBC Report	Winter 11'	Attendance: 425; Referee: E Norris

10 March 2007 Scottish Third Division	Arbroath	2–2	Dumbarton	Gayfield Park
	Rennie 56'; Stein 66'	BBC Report	Geggan 7'; Henry 12'	Attendance: 810; Referee: D Somers

13 March 2007 Scottish Third Division	Dumbarton	1–1	Stenhousemuir	Dumbarton Football Stadium
	McCulloch 56' (OG)	BBC Report	Dempster 40'	Attendance: 528; Referee: A Law

17 March 2007 Scottish Third Division	Stenhousemuir	5–1	Dumbarton	Ochilview
	Tyrrell 4'; Dempster 44'; Hutchison 65'; Thomson 82'; Grindlay 85' (OG)	BBC Report	Craig 37'	Attendance: 512; Referee: J McKendrick

21 March 2007 Scottish Third Division	East Fife	1–0	Dumbarton	Bayview Stadium
	O'Reilly 71'	BBC Report		Attendance: 443; Referee: S Nicholls

25 March 2007 Scottish Third Division	Dumbarton	0–2	East Fife	Dumbarton Football Stadium
		BBC Report	Young 16'; Smart 38'	Attendance: 561; Referee: C Boyle

31 March 2007 Scottish Third Division	Dumbarton	1–0	Elgin City	Dumbarton Football Stadium
	Boyle 79'	BBC Report		Attendance: 521; Referee: G Hilland

3 April 2007 Scottish Third Division	Dumbarton	1–0	Arbroath	Dumbarton Football Stadium
	Borris 54'	BBC Report		Attendance: 527

7 April 2006 Scottish Third Division	Albion Rovers	0–1	Dumbarton	Cliftonhill
		BBC Report	McQuilken 42'	Attendance: 619; Referee: A Boyd

14 April 2007 Scottish Third Division	Dumbarton	2–1	Montrose	Dumbarton Football Stadium
	McQuilken 3', 66'	BBC Report

21 April 2007 Scottish Third Division	East Stirlingshire	1–5	Dumbarton	Firs Park
	Boyle 90'	BBC Report	McQuilken 15'; Borris 22'; McNaught 29'; Boyle 41'; Coyne 80'	Attendance: 392; Referee: C Charleston

28 April 2007 Scottish Third Division	Dumbarton	1–2	Queen's Park	Dumbarton Football Stadium
	Coyne 89'	Report	Dunn 35'; Weatherston 78'	Attendance: 928; Referee: C Brown

=== CIS League Cup ===
8 August 2006 Scottish League Cup round 1	Dumbarton	3–0	Stirling Albion	Dumbarton Football Stadium
	Bagan 74'; Boyle 88'; Gemmell 90'	BBC Report		Attendance: 544; Referee: B Winter

23 August 2006 Scottish League Cup round 2	Inverness Caledonian Thistle	3–1	Dumbarton	Caledonian Stadium
	Wyness 6'; Bayne 54'; McAllister 72'	BBC Report	Dobbie 30'	Attendance: 1,085; Referee: C Murray

=== Scottish League Challenge Cup ===
15 August 2006 Scottish Challenge Cup round 1	Dumbarton	1–2 (a.e.t.)	Morton	Dumbarton Football Stadium
	McNaught 114'	BBC report	Weatherston 117', 119'	Attendance: 932; Referee: E Norris

=== Scottish Cup ===
9 December 2006 Scottish Cup round 2	Raith Rovers	0–1	Dumbarton	Starks Park
		BBC Report	Gemmell 51'	Attendance: 1,616; Referee: C Hardie

6 January 2007 Scottish Cup round 3	Celtic	4–0	Dumbarton	Celtic Park
	Zurawski 4', 9'; Vennegoor of Hesselink 43'; Riordan 69'	BBC Report		Attendance: 18,685; Referee: W Collum

=== Stirlingshire Cup ===
11 July 2006 Group stage	Dumbarton	2–1	Alloa Athletic	Dumbarton Football Stadium
	Gemmell		Goal	Attendance: 350

17 July 2007 Group stage	Stirling Albion	1–1 (lost on pens p)	Dumbarton	Forthbank Stadium
	Goal		Boyle	Attendance: 287

=== Pre-season and mid-season friendlies ===
15 July 2006 Friendly	Dumbarton	1–1	Hamilton	Dumbarton Football Stadium
	Boyle		Goal	Attendance: 250

19 July 2006 Friendly	Dumbarton	0–0	St Mirren	Dumbarton Football Stadium

24 July 2006 Friendly	Dumbarton	1–0	Rangers XI	Dumbarton Football Stadium
	Gemmell 19'			Attendance: 1,415

29 July 2006 Friendly	Dumbarton	1–1	Gretna	Dumbarton Football Stadium
	Dillon		Goal	Attendance: 215

31 January 2007 Friendly	Dumbarton	2–2	Celtic XI	Dumbarton Football Stadium
	Geggan; Bagan		Goal

== League table ==
Pos	Team	Pld	W	D	L	GF	GA	GD	Pts	Promotion or qualification
3	Queen's Park (O, P)	36	21	5	10	57	28	+29	68	Qualification for the Second Division Play-offs (Note: The 2nd, 3rd and 4th placed teams will be entered into a play-off with the Second Division's 9th placed team. The winning team will be awarded a place in the 2007–08 Second Division, Stranraer were relegated and Queen's Park were promoted.)
4	East Fife	36	20	7	9	59	37	+22	67	Qualification for the Second Division Play-offs
5	Dumbarton	36	18	5	13	52	37	+15	59	
6	Albion Rovers	36	14	6	16	56	61	−5	48	
7	Stenhousemuir	36	13	5	18	53	63	−10	44	

Source: Soccerway
Rules for classification: 1) points; 2) goal difference; 3) number of goals scored.
(O) Play-off winners; (P) Promoted

== Player statistics ==
=== Squad ===
No.	Pos	Nat	Player	Total		Third Division		League Cup		Challenge Cup		Scottish Cup	
No.	Pos	Nat	Player	Apps	Goals	Apps	Goals	Apps	Goals	Apps	Goals	Apps	Goals
	GK	(Scotland) SCO	Stephen Grindlay	40	0	36+0	0	2+0	0	0+0	0	2+0	0
	GK	(Scotland) SCO	Peter Shaw	1	0	0+0	0	0+0	0	1+0	0	0+0	0
	DF	(Scotland) SCO	Craig Brittain	34	0	27+2	0	1+1	0	1+0	0	2+0	0
	DF	(Scotland) SCO	David Craig	41	1	36+0	1	2+0	0	1+0	0	2+0	0
	DF	(Scotland) SCO	Mark Dempsie	1	0	1+0	0	0+0	0	0+0	0	0+0	0
	DF	(Scotland) SCO	Kevin McCann	1	0	1+0	0	0+0	0	0+0	0	0+0	0
	DF	(Scotland) SCO	Jamie Smith	4	0	3+1	0	0+0	0	0+0	0	0+0	0
	MF	(Scotland) SCO	David Bagan	33	4	25+3	3	2+0	1	1+0	0	2+0	0
	MF	(Scotland) SCO	Chris Boyle	40	4	32+3	3	1+1	1	0+1	0	2+0	0
	MF	(Scotland) SCO	Mark Canning	38	0	32+1	0	2+0	0	1+0	0	2+0	0
	MF	(Scotland) SCO	John Dillon	33	1	18+12	1	2+0	0	1+0	0	0+0	0
	MF	(Scotland) SCO	Andy Geggan	37	1	31+1	1	2+0	0	1+0	0	2+0	0
	MF	(Scotland) SCO	Chris Gentile	18	3	8+5	3	2+0	0	1+0	0	2+0	0
	MF	(Scotland) SCO	Chris Hamilton	29	2	12+15	2	0+0	0	0+0	0	0+2	0
	MF	(Scotland) SCO	John Henry	5	1	3+2	1	0+0	0	0+0	0	0+0	0
	MF	(Scotland) SCO	John McKeever	9	0	0+7	0	0+1	0	0+1	0	0+0	0
	MF	(Scotland) SCO	Jason McLaughlin	1	0	0+1	0	0+0	0	0+0	0	0+0	0
	MF	(Scotland) SCO	Fergus Tiernan	7	0	6+1	0	0+0	0	0+0	0	0+0	0
	MF	(Scotland) SCO	Craig Winter	34	6	30+1	6	0+0	0	1+0	0	2+0	0
	FW	(Scotland) SCO	Ryan Borris	36	6	31+0	6	2+0	0	1+0	0	2+0	0
	FW	(Scotland) SCO	Tommy Coyne	16	6	10+6	6	0+0	0	0+0	0	0+0	0
	FW	(Scotland) SCO	Stephen Dobbie	18	11	17+0	10	1+0	1	0+0	0	0+0	0
	FW	(Scotland) SCO	John Gemmell	8	2	1+4	0	1+0	1	0+0	0	1+1	1
	FW	(Scotland) SCO	David McNaught	35	3	25+6	2	2+0	0	1+0	1	0+1	0
	FW	(Scotland) SCO	Paul McQuilken	24	4	11+11	4	0+0	0	0+0	0	1+1	0
	FW	(Angola) ANG	José Quitongo	4	1	0+2	1	0+1	0	0+1	0	0+0	0

=== Transfers ===
==== Players in ====
Player	From	Date
(Scotland) Mark Canning	(Scotland) Kilwinning Rangers	6 Jul 2006
(Scotland) Kevin McCann	(Scotland) Shamrock BC	11 Jul 2006
(Scotland) David Craig	(Scotland) Partick Thistle	31 Jul 2006
(Scotland) John McKeever	(Scotland) Dumbarton Ac	31 Jul 2006
(Scotland) Jason McLaughlin	(Scotland) Albion Rovers	31 Jul 2006
(Scotland) Peter Shaw	(Scotland) Dunfermline Athletic	2 Aug 2006
(Scotland) David Bagan	(Scotland) Raith Rovers	6 Aug 2006
(Scotland) Andy Geggan	(Scotland) St Johnstone	8 Aug 2006
(Angola) José Quitongo	(Scotland) Partick Thistle	15 Aug 2006
(Scotland) Stephen Dobbie	(Scotland) St Johnstone (loan)	18 Aug 2006
(Scotland) Chris Hamilton	(Scotland) Livingston	15 Sep 2006
(Scotland) Tommy Coyne	(Scotland) Stirling Albion	25 Jan 2007
(Scotland) John Henry	(Scotland) Queen of the South	3 Feb 2007
(Scotland) Fergus Tiernan	(Scotland) Ross County	30 Mar 2007

==== Players out ====
Player	To	Date
(Scotland) Iain Russell	(Scotland) Brechin City	2 Jun 2006
(Scotland) Robert Walker	(Scotland) Stranraer	30 Jun 2006
(Scotland) Kevin Gaughan	(Scotland) Stranraer	20 Jul 2006
(Scotland) Paul Ronald	(Scotland) Queen's Park	4 Aug 2006
(Scotland) Scott Bannerman	(Scotland) Cowdenbeath	9 Sep 2006
(Scotland) Graham Connell	(Scotland) Stenhousemuir	6 Oct 2006
(Scotland) John Dillon	(Scotland) Stenhousemuir	18 May 2007
(Scotland) Chris Boyle	(Australia) Sorrento	
(Scotland) John Gemmell	(Scotland) Bellshill Athletic	
(Scotland) Kevin McCann	(Scotland) Largs Thistle	
(Scotland) Mark Dempsie		

== Trivia ==
- The League match against East Stiring on 21 October marked Chris Boyle's 100th appearance for Dumbarton in all national competitions - the 129th Dumbarton player to reach this milestone.
- The League match against Queens Park on 30 December marked Craig Brittain's 300th appearance for Dumbarton in all national competitions - the 7th Dumbarton player to achieve this accolade.

== See also ==
- 2006–07 in Scottish football
