= 2003–04 Dumbarton F.C. season =

Dumbarton
2003-04 season
- Manager: Brian Fairlie
- Stadium: Strathclyde Homes Stadium, Dumbarton
- Scottish League Division 2: 3rd
- Scottish Cup: First Round
- Scottish League Cup: Second Round
- Bell's Challenge Cup: Second Round
- Top goalscorer: League: Iain Russell (10); All: Iain Russell (10)
- Highest home attendance: 1,861
- Lowest home attendance: 552
- Average home league attendance: 1,036

Season 2003–04 was the 120th football season in which Dumbarton competed at a Scottish national level, entering the Scottish Football League for the 98th time, the Scottish Cup for the 109th time, the Scottish League Cup for the 57th time and the Scottish Challenge Cup for the 13th time.

== Overview ==
Not withstanding the improvement in performances towards the end of the previous season, manager David Winnie set about a considerable change in playing staff. Unfortunately, despite an initial burst, it would take longer than expected for the new players to settle in, and by the end of October, only one league win had been recorded. However, from then until the end of the season, the league campaign saw a vast improvement in results and in the end a 3rd-place finish was achieved - missing promotion by just 2 points.

In the Scottish Cup, it would be a first round exit for the third season in a row, with a heavy defeat to Gretna.

In the League Cup, following a win over Ayr United in the first round, it would be Premier Division Aberdeen that would bring Dumbarton's interest in the competition to an end.

Finally, in the Scottish Challenge Cup, it was back to old habits, with Ross County handing out a first round thumping.

Locally, in the Stirlingshire Cup, Dumbarton lost both of their opening group ties - however each tie was lost on a penalty shoot out.

== Results & fixtures ==
Win Draw Loss

=== Scottish Second Division ===
9 August 2003 Scottish Second Division	Alloa Athletic	1–2	Dumbarton	Recreation Park, Alloa
	Smith 3'	BBC Report	Bradley 8'; Flannery 46'	Attendance: 446; Referee: G Mitchell

16 August 2003 Scottish Second Division	Dumbarton	1–1	Arbroath	Dumbarton Football Stadium
	Flannery 57'	Report	Cargill 84'	Attendance: 1,050; Referee: I Brines

23 August 2003 Scottish Second Division	Morton	2–2	Dumbarton	Cappielow
	Williams 31' (pen.); Weatherston 83'	BBC Report	Flannery 57'; Boyle 58'	Attendance: 3,402; Referee: C Conroy

30 August 2003 Scottish Second Division	Airdrie United	2–0	Dumbarton	Excelsior Stadium
	Dunn 6'; Glancy	BBC Report		Attendance: 1,468; Referee: C Allan

13 September 2003 Scottish Second Division	Dumbarton	1–1	Berwick Rangers	Dumbarton Football Stadium
	Dillon 17'	BBC Report	Hutchison	Attendance: 722; Referee: C Melville

20 September 2003 Scottish Second Division	Forfar Athletic	3–1	Dumbarton	Station Park, Forfar
	Tosh 4'; Henderson 56'; Shields 83'	BBC Report	Collins 66'	Attendance: 449; Referee: A Freeland

27 September 2003 Scottish Second Division	Dumbarton	0–1	Stenhousemuir	Dumbarton Football Stadium
		BBC Report	Harty 89'	Attendance: 747; Referee: C Murray

4 October 2003 Scottish Second Division	East Fife	1–0	Dumbarton	Bayview Stadium
	Lynes 81'	BBC Report		Attendance: 518; Referee: T Brown

18 October 2003 Scottish Second Division	Dumbarton	0–3	Hamilton	Dumbarton Football Stadium
		BBC Report	Corcoran 26'; Quitongo 46'; Thomson 69'	Attendance: 890; Referee: C Boyle

25 October 2003 Scottish Second Division	Arbroath	2–1	Dumbarton	Gayfield Park
	Cargill 42'; McGlashan 69'	BBC Report	McEwan 57'	Attendance: 506; Referee: J Rowbotham

1 November 2003 Scottish Second Division	Dumbarton	1–0	Alloa Athletic	Dumbarton Football Stadium
	McEwan (pen.)	BBC Report		Attendance: 742; Referee: E Smith

8 November 2003 Scottish Second Division	Berwick Rangers	1–4	Dumbarton	Shielfield Park
	McCutcheon 36'	BBC Report	Bonar 5'; English 18'; Dillon 21', 23'	Attendance: 722; Referee: E Mack

16 November 2003 Scottish Second Division	Dumbarton	2–0	Airdrie United	Dumbarton Football Stadium
	Dillon	BBC Report		Attendance: 1,361; Referee: M Sproule

6 December 2003 Scottish Second Division	Stenhousemuir	1–1	Dumbarton	Ochilview
	Brown 10'	BBC Report	Bradley 31'	Attendance: 588; Referee: M Ritchie

13 December 2003 Scottish Second Division	Dumbarton	3–1	East Fife	Dumbarton Football Stadium
	Dillon 18'; Bonar 47'; Russell 78'	BBC Report	McDonald 67'	Attendance: 653; Referee: C Boyle

3 January 2004 Scottish Second Division	Dumbarton	1–0	Morton	Dumbarton Football Stadium
	Russell 5'	BBC Report		Attendance: 1,861; Referee: C Hardie

10 January 2004 Scottish Second Division	Dumbarton	2–1	Forfar Athletic	Dumbarton Football Stadium
	Dillon 43'; Rodgers	BBC Report	Tosh 17' (pen.)	Attendance: 803; Referee: J Downie

17 January 2004 Scottish Second Division	Alloa Athletic	3–0	Dumbarton	Recreation Park, Alloa
	Hamilton 7'; Daly 82'; Callaghan 90'	BBC Report		Attendance: 423; Referee: C Allan

24 January 2004 Scottish Second Division	Forfar Athletic	1–0	Dumbarton	Station Park, Forfar
	Tosh 24'	BBC Report		Attendance: 540; Referee: S MacDonald

7 February 2004 Scottish Second Division	Dumbarton	4–1	Berwick Rangers	Dumbarton Football Stadium
	McEwan (pen.); Herd 6'; Brittain; Russell	BBC Report	Cowan	Attendance: 722; Referee: J Flemming

14 February 2004 Scottish Second Division	Airdrie United	1–1	Dumbarton	Excelsior Stadium
	Vareille 10'	BBC Report	Rodgers 88'	Attendance: 1,379; Referee: K Toner

21 February 2004 Scottish Second Division	Dumbarton	2–0	Hamilton	Dumbarton Football Stadium
	Bonar 45'; Russell 85'	BBC Report		Attendance: 1,046; Referee: C Conroy

6 March 2004 Scottish Second Division	Dumbarton	1–0	Arbroath	Dumbarton Football Stadium
	Rodgers 22'	BBC Report		Attendance: 828; Referee: E Smith

9 March 2004 Scottish Second Division	Hamilton	2–0	Dumbarton	New Douglas Park
	McPhee; Gribben	BBC Report		Attendance: 949; Referee: J Gilmour

13 March 2004 Scottish Second Division	Morton	3–2	Dumbarton	Cappielow
	Greacen; Miller; Williams	BBC Report	McEwan (pen.); Bonar	Attendance: 2,705; Referee: C Richmond

16 March 2004 Scottish Second Division	East Fife	1–3	Dumbarton	Bayview Stadium
	Fairbairn 31'	BBC Report	Russell 9'; Herd 85'; Boyle 81'	Attendance: 439; Referee: M Tumilty

23 March 2004 Scottish Second Division	Dumbarton	4–0	Stenhousemuir	Dumbarton Football Stadium
	Russell 1', 13'; Boyle 17'; Bonar 75'	BBC Report		Attendance: 552; Referee: M Sproule

27 March 2004 Scottish Second Division	Dumbarton	1–2	Airdrie United	Dumbarton Football Stadium
	Herd 29'	BBC Report	Glancy 9'; McLaren 62'	Attendance: 1,536; Referee: C Thomson

30 March 2004 Scottish Second Division	Berwick Rangers	1–2	Dumbarton	Shielfield Park
	Bennett 67' (pen.)	BBC Report	Russell 23'; Boyle 74'	Attendance: 354; Referee: C Boyle

3 April 2004 Scottish Second Division	Stenhousemuir	1–2	Dumbarton	Ochilview
	Brown 87'	BBC Report	Ronald 2'; Dillon 71'	Attendance: 412; Referee: K Toner

10 April 2004 Scottish Second Division	Dumbarton	1–1	Forfar Athletic	Dumbarton Football Stadium
	Herd	BBC Report	Maher 23'	Attendance: 1,007; Referee: E Mack

17 April 2004 Scottish Second Division	Hamilton	2–1	Dumbarton	New Douglas Park
	Thomson 55'; Gemmell 89'	BBC Report	Collins 7' (pen.)	Attendance: 1,343; Referee: C Murray

24 April 2004 Scottish Second Division	Dumbarton	1–0	East Fife	Dumbarton Football Stadium
	Russell	BBC Report		Attendance: 827; Referee: J Gilmour

1 May 2004 Scottish Second Division	Dumbarton	3–0	Morton	Dumbarton Football Stadium
	Ronald; Herd 57'; Russell 85'	BBC Report		Attendance: 1,861; Referee: J Underhill

8 May 2004 Scottish Second Division	Arbroath	0–3	Dumbarton	Gayfield Park
		BBC Report	Ronald 29'; Herd 33'	Attendance: 531; Referee: S Duff

15 May 2004 Scottish Second Division	Dumbarton	3–1	Alloa Athletic	Dumbarton Football Stadium
	Herd 68'; Skjelered Dillon	BBC Report	McGowan 44'	Attendance: 1,439; Referee: I Fyfe

=== Bell's Challenge Cup ===
13 August 2003 Scottish Challenge Cup round 2	Ross County	5–0	Dumbarton	Victoria Park, Dingwall
	Winters 29', 74'; Hamilton 70'	BBC report		Attendance: 861; Referee: I Fyfe

=== CIS League Cup ===
2 September 2003 Scottish League Cup round 1	Ayr United	1–2	Dumbarton	Somerset Park
	Smyth	BBC Report	Flannery; Bonar 90'	Attendance: 1,048; Referee: E Mack

23 September 2003 Scottish League Cup round 2	Aberdeen	3–1	Dumbarton	Pittodrie Stadium
	Zdrilic 14', 45'; Hinds 46'	BBC Report	Obedile 81'	Attendance: 3,944; Referee: W Young

=== Scottish Cup ===
22 November 2003 Scottish Cup round 1	Gretna	4–0	Dumbarton	Raydale Park
	Stevens 6'; Skelton 74'; Holdsworth 80'; Gordan 86'	BBC Report		Attendance: 652; Referee: E Smith

=== Stirlingshire Cup ===
19 July 2003 Group stage	Falkirk	0–0 (4-3 p)	Dumbarton	Falkirk Stadium
				Attendance: 748

29 July 2003 Group stage	Dumbarton	1–1 (1-3 p)	Stirling Albion	Dumbarton Football Stadium
	Herd		Goal

=== Pre-season and mid-season friendlies ===
23 July 2003 Friendly	Stranraer	3–2	Dumbarton	Stair Park
	Jenkins; Henderson		Herd; English

26 July 2003 Friendly	Dumbarton	1–0	Queen of the South	Dumbarton Football Stadium
	Goal

27 July 2003 Friendly	Sauchie	3–2	Dumbarton	Sauchie
	Goal		Goal

2 August 2003 Friendly	Dumbarton	0–0	Dundee United	Dumbarton Football Stadium
				Attendance: 389; Referee: B Winter

8 September 2003 Friendly	Dumbarton	2–4	Partick Thistle	Dumbarton Football Stadium
	Goal		Goal	Attendance: 250

9 October 2003 Friendly	Stranraer	0–2	Dumbarton	Stair Park
			Flannery; Donald

15 October 2003 Friendly	Dumbarton	5–1	Vale of Leven	Dumbarton Football Stadium
	Flannery; Russell; English; Christie		Goal

27 December 2003 Friendly	Queen's Park	0–3	Dumbarton	Hampden Park
			Rodgers; Mallan

8 January 2004 Friendly	Stirling Albion	1–2	Dumbarton	Forthbank Stadium
	Goal		Mallan

== League table ==
Pos	Team	Pld	W	D	L	GF	GA	GD	Pts	Promotion or relegation
1	Airdrie United (C, P)	36	20	10	6	64	36	+28	70	Promotion to the First Division
2	Hamilton Academical (P)	36	18	8	10	70	47	+23	62	Promotion to the First Division
3	Dumbarton	36	18	6	12	56	41	+15	60	
4	Greenock Morton	36	16	11	9	66	58	+8	59	
5	Berwick Rangers	36	14	6	16	61	67	−6	48	

Source: "2003-2004 Second Division - SPFL Archive". SPFL.
Rules for classification: 1) points; 2) goal difference; 3) number of goals scored.
(C) Champions; (P) Promoted

== Player statistics ==
=== Squad ===
No.	Pos	Nat	Player	Total		Second Division		League Cup		Challenge Cup		Scottish Cup	
No.	Pos	Nat	Player	Apps	Goals	Apps	Goals	Apps	Goals	Apps	Goals	Apps	Goals
	GK	(Scotland) SCO	Stephen Grindlay	38	0	34+0	0	2+0	0	1+0	0	1+0	0
	GK	(Scotland) SCO	Kris Robertson	2	0	2+0	0	0+0	0	0+0	0	0+0	0
	GK	(Scotland) SCO	John Wight	2	0	0+1	0	0+0	0	0+0	0	0+1	0
	DF	(Scotland) SCO	Craig Brittain	36	1	32+0	1	2+0	0	1+0	0	1+0	0
	DF	(Scotland) SCO	Neil Collins	34	2	29+1	2	2+0	0	1+0	0	1+0	0
	DF	(Scotland) SCO	Ian Dobbins	20	0	12+5	0	2+0	0	0+0	0	0+1	0
	DF	(Scotland) SCO	Neil Duffy	11	0	8+1	0	1+0	0	1+0	0	0+0	0
	DF	(Scotland) SCO	Craig McEwan	25	4	19+4	4	1+0	0	0+0	0	1+0	0
	DF	(Scotland) SCO	James McKinstry	40	0	36+0	0	2+0	0	1+0	0	1+0	0
	DF	(Nigeria) NGA	James Okoli	2	0	2+0	0	0+0	0	0+0	0	0+0	0
	DF	(Scotland) SCO	Steve Renicks	18	0	7+11	0	0+0	0	0+0	0	0+0	0
	MF	(Scotland) SCO	Steven Bonar	39	6	35+0	5	1+1	1	1+0	0	1+0	0
	MF	(Scotland) SCO	Chris Boyle	32	4	17+11	4	2+0	0	0+1	0	1+0	0
	MF	(Scotland) SCO	Mark Bradley	28	2	18+6	2	2+0	0	1+0	0	1+0	0
	MF	(Scotland) SCO	John Dillon	39	8	31+5	8	0+1	0	1+0	0	1+0	0
	MF	(Scotland) SCO	Barry Donald	28	0	24+2	0	1+1	0	0+0	0	0+0	0
	MF	(Scotland) SCO	Steve Laidler	6	0	0+6	0	0+0	0	0+0	0	0+0	0
	MF	(Nigeria) NGA	Emeka Obidile	13	1	8+2	0	2+0	1	0+0	0	1+0	0
	MF	(Scotland) SCO	Danny Smith	7	0	4+1	0	1+0	0	1+0	0	0+0	0
	FW	(Scotland) SCO	Isaac English	11	1	8+1	1	0+0	0	0+1	0	1+0	0
	FW	(Scotland) SCO	Paddy Flannery	13	4	8+2	3	1+1	1	1+0	0	0+0	0
	FW	(Scotland) SCO	Gordon Herd	21	8	11+9	8	0+0	0	0+1	0	0+0	0
	FW	(Scotland) SCO	Stevie Mallan	5	0	3+2	0	0+0	0	0+0	0	0+0	0
	FW	(Scotland) SCO	Andy Rodgers	11	4	7+4	4	0+0	0	0+0	0	0+0	0
	FW	(Scotland) SCO	Paul Ronald	14	3	13+1	3	0+0	0	0+0	0	0+0	0
	FW	(Scotland) SCO	Iain Russell	36	10	26+7	10	0+1	0	1+0	0	0+1	0
	FW	(Norway) NOR	Bjorn Skjelbred	8	1	2+6	1	0+0	0	0+0	0	0+0	0

=== Transfers ===
==== Players in ====
Player	From	Date
(Scotland) Mark Bradley	(Scotland) Berwick Rangers	6 Jun 2003
(Scotland) Steve Renicks	(Scotland) Queen of the South	6 Jun 2003
(Scotland) Chris Boyle	(Scotland) Kilmarnock	11 Jun 2003
(Scotland) Gordon Herd	(Scotland) Bo'ness United	7 Jul 2003
(Scotland) James McKinstry	(Scotland) Partick Thistle	7 Jul 2003
(Scotland) Danny Smith	(Scotland) Linlithgow Rose	7 Jul 2003
(Scotland) Isaac English	(Scotland) Bo'ness United	19 Jul 2003
(Nigeria) James Okoli	(England) York City	9 Aug 2003
(Scotland) Ian Dobbins	(Scotland) Hamilton	29 Aug 2003
(Scotland) Kris Robertson	(Scotland) St Mirren	27 Sep 2003
(Scotland) Stevie Mallan	(Scotland) Stenhousemuir	5 Dec 2003
(Scotland) Andy Rodgers	(Scotland) Falkirk	19 Dec 2003
(Scotland) Paul Ronald	(Scotland) Airdrie United	31 Jan 2004
(Scotland) Steve Laidler	(England) Reading	11 Mar 2004
(Norway) Bjorn Skjelbred	(Norway) FK Tønsberg	31 Mar 2004

==== Players out ====
Player	To	Date
(Scotland) Andy Brown	(Scotland) Stenhousemuir	6 Jun 2003
(Scotland) Dave Stewart	(Scotland) Forfar Athletic	2 Jul 2003
(Scotland) Craig Lynes	(Scotland) East Fife	3 Jul 2003
(Scotland) Neil Scally	(Scotland) Falkirk	8 Jul 2003
(Scotland) Kevin McCann	(Scotland) East Stirling	15 Jul 2003
(Scotland) John McKeown	(Scotland) Cowdenbeath	19 Jul 2003
(Scotland) Gary McCutcheon	(Scotland) Berwick Rangers	16 Aug 2003
(Scotland) Kris Robertson	(Scotland) Queen of the South	3 Dec 2003
(Scotland) Paddy Flannery	(Scotland) Stenhousemuir	4 Dec 2003
(Scotland) Tom Brown	(Scotland) Bellshill Athletic	
(Scotland) Michael Dickie	(Scotland) Maryhill	
(Scotland) Neil Duffy	(Scotland) Sauchie	
(Scotland) Stevie Mallan	(Scotland) Glenafton Athletic	
(Nigeria) Emeka Obidile	(England) Buckingham Town	
(Nigeria) James Okoli	(Germany) FC Ismaning	
(Scotland) Danny Smith	(Scotland) Linlithgow Rose	
(Scotland) Isaac English		

== Trivia ==
- The League match against Forfar Athletic on 20 September marked Craig Brittain's 200th appearance for Dumbarton in all national competitions - the 28th Dumbarton player to break the 'double century'.

== See also ==
- 2003–04 in Scottish football
