= 2005–06 Scottish Football League =

Scottish football season

Statistics of the Scottish Football League in season 2005–06.

== Scottish First Division ==
=== League standings ===
| Pos | Team | Pld | W | D | L | GF | GA | GD | Pts | Promotion, qualification or relegation |
|---|---|---|---|---|---|---|---|---|---|---|
| 1 | St Mirren (C, P) | 36 | 23 | 7 | 6 | 52 | 28 | +24 | 76 | Promotion to the Premier League |
| 2 | St Johnstone | 36 | 18 | 12 | 6 | 59 | 34 | +25 | 66 | |
| 3 | Hamilton Academical | 36 | 15 | 14 | 7 | 53 | 39 | +14 | 59 | |
| 4 | Ross County | 36 | 14 | 14 | 8 | 47 | 40 | +7 | 56 | |
| 5 | Clyde | 36 | 15 | 10 | 11 | 54 | 42 | +12 | 55 | |
| 6 | Airdrie United | 36 | 11 | 12 | 13 | 57 | 43 | +14 | 45 | |
| 7 | Dundee | 36 | 9 | 16 | 11 | 43 | 50 | −7 | 43 | |
| 8 | Queen of the South | 36 | 7 | 12 | 17 | 31 | 54 | −23 | 33 | |
| 9 | Stranraer (R) | 36 | 5 | 14 | 17 | 33 | 53 | −20 | 29 | Qualification for the First Division Play-offs |
| 10 | Brechin City (R) | 36 | 2 | 11 | 23 | 28 | 74 | −46 | 17 | Relegation to the Second Division |

Source: "2005-2006 First Division - SPFL Archive". SPFL.
Rules for classification: 1) points; 2) goal difference; 3) number of goals scored.
(C) Champions; (P) Promoted; (R) Relegated

=== Top scorers ===
| Player | Club | Goals |
|---|---|---|
| (Scotland) Bryan Prunty | Airdrie United | 15 |
| (Trinidad and Tobago) Jason Scotland | St Johnstone | 15 |
| (England) John Sutton | St Mirren | 14 |
| (Scotland) Alex Williams | Clyde | 13 |
| (Scotland) Simon Lynch | Dundee | 13 |
| (Scotland) Stewart Kean | St Mirren | 12 |
| (Scotland) John Rankin | Ross County | 12 |
| (Scotland) Stephen O'Donnell | Clyde | 11 |

== Scottish Second Division ==
=== League standings ===
| Pos | Team | Pld | W | D | L | GF | GA | GD | Pts | Promotion, qualification or relegation |
|---|---|---|---|---|---|---|---|---|---|---|
| 1 | Gretna (C, P) | 36 | 28 | 4 | 4 | 97 | 30 | +67 | 88 | Promotion to the 2006–07 First Division and qualification for UEFA Cup second qualifying round (Note: As Heart of Midlothian, the Scottish Cup winners, qualified for the Champions League via their league position, the place in the UEFA Cup was passed to Gretna, the cup runner-up.) |
| 2 | Greenock Morton | 36 | 21 | 7 | 8 | 58 | 33 | +25 | 70 | Qualification for the First Division Play-offs (Note: The 2nd, 3rd and 4th placed teams will be entered into a play-off with the First Division's 9th placed team. The winning team were awarded a place in the 2006–07 First Division, Stranraer were relegated and Partick Thistle were promoted.) |
| 3 | Peterhead | 36 | 17 | 6 | 13 | 53 | 47 | +6 | 57 | Qualification for the First Division Play-offs |
| 4 | Partick Thistle (P) | 36 | 16 | 9 | 11 | 57 | 56 | +1 | 57 | Qualification for the First Division Play-offs |
| 5 | Stirling Albion | 36 | 15 | 6 | 15 | 54 | 63 | −9 | 51 | |
| 6 | Ayr United | 36 | 10 | 12 | 14 | 56 | 61 | −5 | 42 | |
| 7 | Raith Rovers | 36 | 11 | 9 | 16 | 44 | 54 | −10 | 42 | |
| 8 | Forfar Athletic | 36 | 12 | 4 | 20 | 44 | 55 | −11 | 40 | |
| 9 | Alloa Athletic | 36 | 8 | 8 | 20 | 36 | 77 | −41 | 32 | Qualification for the Second Division Play-offs (Note: The 9th placed team were entered into a play-off with the Third Division's 2nd, 3rd and 4th placed teams. The winning team were awarded a place in the 2006–07 Second Division, Alloa Athletic won the play-off to stay in the division.) |
| 10 | Dumbarton (R) | 36 | 7 | 5 | 24 | 40 | 63 | −23 | 26 | Relegation to the 2006–07 Third Division |

Source: "2005-2006 Second Division - SPFL Archive". SPFL.
Rules for classification: 1) points; 2) goal difference; 3) number of goals scored.
(C) Champions; (P) Promoted; (R) Relegated

=== Top scorers ===
| Player | Club | Goals |
|---|---|---|
| (Scotland) Kenny Deuchar | Gretna | 18 |
| (Scotland) James Grady | Gretna | 16 |
| (Scotland) Paul McManus | Raith Rovers | 15 |
| (France) Jerome Vareille | Ayr United | 13 |
| (Scotland) Ryan McGuffie | Gretna | 13 |
| (Scotland) Derek Lilley | Morton | 12 |
| (Scotland) Paddy Connolly | Stirling Albion | 12 |
| (Scotland) Andrew Rodgers | Dumbarton | 12 |
| (Scotland) Chris Aitken | Stirling Albion | 12 |
| (Scotland) Steve Tosh | Gretna | 12 |
| (Scotland) Bobby Linn | Peterhead | 12 |

== Scottish Third Division ==
=== League standings ===
| Pos | Team | Pld | W | D | L | GF | GA | GD | Pts | Promotion or qualification |
|---|---|---|---|---|---|---|---|---|---|---|
| 1 | Cowdenbeath (C, P) | 36 | 24 | 4 | 8 | 81 | 34 | +47 | 76 | Promotion to the Second Division |
| 2 | Berwick Rangers | 36 | 23 | 7 | 6 | 54 | 27 | +27 | 76 | Qualification for the Second Division Play-offs (Note: The 2nd, 3rd and 4th placed teams will be entered into a play-off with the Second Division's 9th placed team. The winning team will be awarded a place in the 2006–07 Second Division, Alloa Athletic won the play-off to stay in the division.) |
| 3 | Stenhousemuir | 36 | 23 | 4 | 9 | 78 | 38 | +40 | 73 | Qualification for the Second Division Play-offs |
| 4 | Arbroath | 36 | 16 | 7 | 13 | 57 | 47 | +10 | 55 | Qualification for the Second Division Play-offs |
| 5 | Elgin City | 36 | 15 | 7 | 14 | 55 | 58 | −3 | 52 | |
| 6 | Queen's Park | 36 | 13 | 12 | 11 | 47 | 42 | +5 | 51 | |
| 7 | East Fife | 36 | 13 | 4 | 19 | 48 | 64 | −16 | 43 | |
| 8 | Albion Rovers | 36 | 7 | 8 | 21 | 39 | 60 | −21 | 29 | |
| 9 | Montrose | 36 | 6 | 10 | 20 | 31 | 59 | −28 | 28 | |
| 10 | East Stirlingshire | 36 | 6 | 5 | 25 | 28 | 89 | −61 | 23 | |

Source: Soccerway
Rules for classification: 1) points; 2) goal difference; 3) number of goals scored.
(C) Champions; (P) Promoted

=== Top scorers ===
| Rank | Scorer | Goals | Team |
|---|---|---|---|
| 1 | (Scotland) Martin Johnston | 20 | Elgin City |
| 2 | (Scotland) Liam Buchanan | 17 | Cowdenbeath |
| 3 | (Scotland) Colin Cramb | 16 | Stenhousemuir |
| 4 | (Scotland) Paul McGrillen | 15 | Stenhousemuir |
| 5 | (Scotland) Kevin Haynes | 13 | Berwick Rangers |
| 6 | (Scotland) Greig Henslee | 10 | Montrose |
| 7 | (Scotland) Gareth Hutchison | 9 | Berwick Rangers |
| 7 | (Scotland) Iain Diack | 9 | Stenhousemuir/ East Stirlingshire |
| 7 | (Scotland) Jay Stein | 9 | Arbroath |
| 7 | (Scotland) Mark Booth | 9 | Elgin City |
| 7 | (Scotland) David McKenna | 9 | Cowdenbeath |

== See also ==
- 2005–06 in Scottish football
