= 2011–12 Cowdenbeath F.C. season =

Cowdenbeath
2011–12 season
- Chairman: Donald Findlay
- Manager: Colin Cameron
- Stadium: Central Park
- Scottish Second Division: 1st (champions)
- Scottish Cup: Fourth round (eliminated by Hibernian)
- League Cup: First round (eliminated by Stenhousemuir)
- Challenge Cup: First round (eliminated by Raith Rovers)
- Top goalscorer: League: Marc McKenzie (18); All: Marc McKenzie (18)
- Highest home attendance: 1,345 vs. Airdrie United, 5 May 2012
- Lowest home attendance: 271 vs. Dumbarton, 26 November 2011
Home colours	Away colours

The 2011–12 season saw Cowdenbeath play their first season back in the Scottish Second Division, having been relegated from the Scottish First Division at the end of the 2010–11 season. Cowdenbeath also competed in the Challenge Cup, League Cup and the Scottish Cup.

== Summary ==
Cowdenbeath finished first in the Second Division, and were promoted as champions to the First Division. They reached the fourth round of the Scottish Cup, the first round of the League Cup and were eliminated in the first round of the Challenge Cup.

=== Management ===
For season 2011–12 Cowdenbeath were managed by Colin Cameron, following the resignation of Jimmy Nicholl at the end of the previous season.

== Results & fixtures ==
Win Draw Loss Postponed

=== Pre-season ===
9 July 2011 Friendly	Spartans	0 – 9	Cowdenbeath	Ainslie Park, Edinburgh
		Cowdenbeath Report	Ramsay 12'; Stewart 19', 29'; Robertson 23'; Trialist no.7 32', 47'; McKenzie 50', 78'; Coult 67'

12 July 2011 Friendly	Cowdenbeath	2 – 1	Heart of Midlothian	Central Park, Cowdenbeath
	Morton 23'; Robertson 88'	Hearts Report	Elliott 76' (pen.)	Referee: Colvin

16 July 2011 Friendly	Cowdenbeath	4 – 0	Dundee United XI	Central Park, Cowdenbeath
	McKenzie 2', 59'; Coult 9'; Ramsay 42' (pen.)	Cowdenbeath Report

19 July 2011 Friendly	Cowdenbeath	3 – 1	St Mirren	Central Park, Cowdenbeath
	Robertson 18'; Stewart 60', 85'	St. Mirren Report	McGowan 27'	Attendance: 221; Referee: Clancy

=== Scottish Second Division ===
6 August 2011 Second Division	Forfar	2 – 2	Cowdenbeath	Station Park, Forfar
	McCulloch 58'; Templeman 62' (pen.)	BBC Report	Ramsay 11'; Coult 78'	Attendance: 469; Referee: Hilland

13 August 2011 Second Division	Cowdenbeath	3 – 1	Brechin City	Central Park, Cowdenbeath
	Ramsay 13'; McKenzie 67'; Morton 80'	BBC Report	Brady 37'	Attendance: 308; Referee: Beaton

20 August 2011 Second Division	Airdrie United	1 – 5	Cowdenbeath	Central Park, Cowdenbeath
	Donnelly 6'	BBC Report	Robertson 37'; Linton 45', 67'; Coult 50'; Morton 78'	Attendance: 834; Referee: Charleston

27 August 2011 Second Division	Stenhousemuir	3 – 1	Cowdenbeath	Ochilview Park, Stenhousemuir
	Rodgers 56'; McHale 72'; Ferguson 77'	BBC Report	Adamson 69'	Attendance: 621; Referee: Salmond

10 September 2011 Second Division	Cowdenbeath	3 – 2	East Fife	Central Park, Cowdenbeath
	Stewart 17'; Park 52' (o.g.); Robertson 76'	BBC Sport	Wallace 3'; Muir 62'	Attendance: 540; Referee: Madden

17 September 2011 Second Division	Dumbarton	0 – 4	Cowdenbeath	Strathclyde Homes Stadium, Dumbarton
		BBC Report	McKenzie 8'; Robertson 19'; Morton 68'; Linton 86'	Attendance: 615; Referee: Tumilty

24 September 2011 Second Division	Cowdenbeath	2 – 1	Albion Rovers	Central Park, Cowdenbeath
	Naismith 21', 37' (pen.)	BBC Report	Chaplain 83' (yellow card) 86' (red card)	Attendance: 304; Referee: Clancy

1 October 2011 Second Division	Arbroath	1 – 1	Cowdenbeath	Gayfield Park, Arbroath
	Falkingham 58'	BBC Report	O'Brien 19'	Attendance: 857; Referee: McDermott

15 October 2011 Second Division	Cowdenbeath	2 – 0	Stirling Albion	Central Park, Cowdenbeath
	Morton 33' (pen.); McKenzie 47'	BBC Report		Attendance: 312; Referee: Hilland

22 October 2011 Second Division	Cowdenbeath	3 – 1	Forfar Athletic	Central Park, Cowdenbeath
	Coult 60'; Stewart 68', 72'	BBC Report	Low 75'	Attendance: 339; Referee: Northcroft

29 October 2011 Second Division	Brechin City	1 – 0	Cowdenbeath	Glebe Park, Brechin
15:00	King 53'	BBC Report		Attendance: 418; Referee: Colvin

5 November 2011 Second Division	East Fife	1 – 3	Cowdenbeath	Bayview Stadium, Methil
15:00	Wallace 6'	BBC Report	Linton 48'; Robertson 62'; Morton 90'	Attendance: 1,022; Referee: Brines

12 November 2011 Second Division	Cowdenbeath	2 – 0	Stenhousemuir	Central Park, Cowdenbeath
	Stewart 15'; Coult 87'	BBC Report		Attendance: 374; Referee: McDermott

26 November 2011 Second Division	Cowdenbeath	0 – 0	Dumbarton	Central Park, Cowdenbeath
		SFL Report		Attendance: 271; Referee: Crawford

3 December 2011 Second Division	Albion Rovers	3 – 3	Cowdenbeath	Cliftonhill, Coatbridge
	Love 2'; Lawless 64', 72'	Cowdenbeath Report	Ramsay 16'; Robertson 67'; Stewart 81'	Attendance: 407; Referee: McKendrick

10 December 2011 Second Division	Cowdenbeath	0 – 0	Arbroath	Central Park, Cowdenbeath
		SFL Report		Attendance: 437; Referee: Winter

17 December 2011 Second Division	Stirling Albion	P – P	Cowdenbeath	Forthbank Stadium, Stirling

26 December 2011 Second Division	Stenhousemuir	0 – 2	Cowdenbeath	Ochilview Park, Stenhousemuir
15:00		SFL Report	Stewart 37'; Coult 88'	Attendance: 576; Referee: Hilland

2 January 2012 Second Division	Cowdenbeath	4 – 0	East Fife	Central Park, Cowdenbeath
	Morton 10'; Cameron 60'; Ramsay 75'; McKenzie 90'	BBC Report		Attendance: 485; Referee: Colvin

14 January 2012 Second Division	Cowdenbeath	2 – 0	Airdrie United	Central Park, Cowdenbeath
	Ramsay 37'; McKenzie 58' (pen.)	SFL Report		Attendance: 408; Referee: Richmond

21 January 2012 Second Division	Forfar Athletic	1 – 0	Cowdenbeath	Station Park, Forfar
15:00	Low 45'	SFL Report		Attendance: 475; Referee: Finnie

28 January 2012 Second Division	Cowdenbeath	P – P	Albion Rovers	Central Park, Cowdenbeath
15:00

4 February 2012 Second Division	Dumbarton	P – P	Cowdenbeath	Dumbarton Football Stadium, Dumbarton
15:00

11 February 2012 Second Division	Cowdenbeath	4 – 1	Stirling Albion	Central Park, Cowdenbeath
15:00	Coult 12', 48', 59'; McKenzie 84'	SFL Report	Thom 36'; McKenzie (red card) 91'	Attendance: 341; Referee: Northcroft

15 February 2012 Second Division	Cowdenbeath	3 – 0	Albion Rovers	Central Park, Cowdenbeath
19:45	Coult 10', 26'; McKenzie 21'	SFL Report		Attendance: 302; Referee: O'Reilly

18 February 2012 Second Division	Arbroath	1 – 1	Cowdenbeath	Gayfield Park, Arbroath
15:00	Innes 42'	SFL Report	McKenzie 60'; Linton (red card) 43'	Attendance: 1,125; Referee: Roache

21 February 2012 Second Division	Stirling Albion	1 – 1	Cowdenbeath	Doubletree Dunblane Stadium, Stirling
19:45	Thom 28'	SFL Report	Coult 56'	Attendance: 329; Referee: Somers

25 February 2012 Second Division	Cowdenbeath	1 – 0	Brechin City	Central Park, Cowdenbeath
15:00	Lyle 90'	SFL Report		Attendance: 332; Referee: Richmond

3 March 2012 Second Division	Airdrie United	1 – 1	Cowdenbeath	Excelsior Stadium, Airdrie
15:00	Lynch 39'	SFL Report	Ramsay 50' (Penalty)	Attendance: 702; Referee: Murray

6 March 2012 Second Division	Dumbarton	0 – 2	Cowdenbeath	Dumbarton Football Stadium, Dumbarton
19:30		SFL Report	Mbu 3'; McKenzie 73'	Attendance: 812; Referee: Hilland

10 March 2012 Second Division	East Fife	0 – 1	Cowdenbeath	Bayview Stadium, Methil
15:00		SFL Report	McKenzie 43'	Attendance: 926; Referee: McKendrick

17 March 2012 Second Division	Cowdenbeath	0 – 0	Stenhousemuir	Central Park, Cowdenbeath
15:00		SFL Report		Attendance: 367; Referee: Colvin

24 March 2012 Second Division	Cowdenbeath	4 – 1	Dumbarton	Central Park, Cowdenbeath
15:00	McKenzie 19', 81'; Coult 29'; Mbu 38'	SFL Report	Dargo 33'	Attendance: 380; Referee: Tumilty

31 March 2012 Second Division	Albion Rovers	1 – 0	Cowdenbeath	Cliftonhill, Coatbridge
15:00	Werndly 7'	SFL Report		Attendance: 402; Referee: Allan

7 April 2012 Second Division	Cowdenbeath	2 – 3	Arbroath	Central Park, Cowdenbeath
15:00	McKenzie 5', 47' (Penalty); Adamson (yellow card) 24' (red card)	SFL Report	Doris 25', 75'; McAnespie 29'	Attendance: 671; Referee: Salmond

14 April 2012 Second Division	Stirling Albion	0 – 2	Cowdenbeath	Doubletree Dunblane Stadium, Stirling
15:00		SFL Report	Coult 6'; McKenzie 89'	Attendance: 568; Referee: Charleston

21 April 2012 Second Division	Cowdenbeath	2 – 0	Forfar Athletic	Central Park, Cowdenbeath
15:00	McKenzie 72', 83'	SFL Report		Attendance: 930; Referee: Anderson

28 April 2012 Second Division	Brechin City	2 – 2	Cowdenbeath	Glebe Park, Brechin
15:00	McKenzie 22' (Penalty), 25'	SFL Report	McKenzie 30'; Armstrong 54'	Attendance: 487; Referee: Cook

5 May 2012 Second Division	Cowdenbeath	0 – 0	Airdrie United	Central Park, Cowdenbeath
15:00		SFL Report		Attendance: 1,345; Referee: Norris

=== Scottish Cup ===
19 November 2011 Scottish Cup round 3	Bo'ness United	0 – 3	Cowdenbeath	Newtown Park, Bo'ness
13:45	Scanlon (yellow card) 24' (red card); Hunter (red card) 87'	BBC Report	Robertson 38'; Linton 66'; Coult 87'	Attendance: 1,176; Referee: Robertson

7 January 2012 Scottish Cup round 4	Cowdenbeath	2 – 3	Hibernian	Central Park, Cowdenbeath
15:00	Stewart 1'; Robertson 69'	BBC Sport	Griffiths 18'; Doyle 27'; Wotherspoon 54'	Attendance: 2,670; Referee: Madden

=== Scottish League Cup ===
30 July 2011 Scottish League Cup round 1	Cowdenbeath	2 – 2 (a.e.t.) (3 – 4 p)	Stenhousemuir	Central Park, Cowdenbeath
	Ramsay 28', 40'	SFL Report	Lyle 4'; Paton 53'	Attendance: 293; Referee: McKendrick
	Penalties
	Cameron (penalty missed); Robertson (penalty scored); Ramsay (penalty scored); McKenzie (penalty scored); Stewart (penalty missed)		Paton (penalty scored); Murray (penalty scored); Rodgers (penalty scored); Thomson (penalty scored); Kean (penalty missed)

=== Scottish Challenge Cup ===
23 July 2011 Scottish Challenge Cup round 1	Raith Rovers	2 – 1	Cowdenbeath	Stark's Park, Kirkcaldy
	Baird 51', 77'	BBC Report	Coult 80'	Attendance: 1,098; Referee: Tumilty

=== Fife cup ===
30 August 2011 Fife Cup Semi-final	East Fife	0 – 6	Cowdenbeath	Bayview Stadium, Methil
		Cowdembeath Report	Ferguson 24', 31' (pen.), 34', 57'; Stewart 44'; O'Brien 58'	Referee: Lambie

6 October 2011 Fife Cup Final	Raith Rovers	3 – 0	Cowdenbeath	Stark's Park, Kirkcaldy
	Graham 1', 20', 52'	Cowdenbeath Report		Attendance: 320; Referee: McGeachie

== Player statistics ==
=== Captains ===
No.	P	Name	Country	No. games	Notes
	MF	Jon Robertson	(Scotland)	39	Club captain

Last updated: 5 May 2012
Source: Competitive match reports.
Competitive matches only
Matches started as captain only
Country: FIFA nationality; No.: Squad number; P: Position; Name: Player name; No. Games: Number of games started as captain.

=== Squad ===
Last updated 5 May 2012

No.	Pos	Nat	Player	Total		Scottish Second Division		Scottish Cup		League Cup		Challenge Cup	
No.	Pos	Nat	Player	Apps	Goals	Apps	Goals	Apps	Goals	Apps	Goals	Apps	Goals
	GK	(Scotland) SCO	Youssef Bejaoui	7	0	5+0	0	0+0	0	1+0	0	1+0	0
	GK	(England) ENG	Thomas Flynn	32	0	30+0	0	2+0	0	0+0	0	0+0	0
	GK	(Scotland) SCO	Lee Wilson	1	0	1+0	0	0+0	0	0+0	0	0+0	0
	DF	(Scotland) SCO	Kenny Adamson	35	1	30+1	1	2+0	0	1+0	0	1+0	0
	DF	(Scotland) SCO	John Armstrong	35	1	33+1	1	1+0	0	0+0	0	0+0	0
	DF	(Scotland) SCO	Steven Bennett	0	0	0+0	0	0+0	0	0+0	0	0+0	0
	DF	(Scotland) SCO	Dean Brett	16	0	14+0	0	0+0	0	1+0	0	1+0	0
	DF	(Scotland) SCO	Paul Byrne	2	0	0+2	0	0+0	0	0+0	0	0+0	0
	DF	(Scotland) SCO	Dene Droudge	0	0	0+0	0	0+0	0	0+0	0	0+0	0
	DF	(Scotland) SCO	Scott Linton	37	5	30+3	4	2+0	1	0+1	0	1+0	0
	DF	(Scotland) SCO	Joe Mbu	34	2	30+0	2	2+0	0	1+0	0	1+0	0
	DF	(Scotland) SCO	Thomas O'Brien	16	1	11+4	1	1+0	0	0+0	0	0+0	0
	DF	(England) ENG	David Cowan	17	0	15+0	0	2+0	0	0+0	0	0+0	0
	DF	(Scotland) SCO	Gary Fisher	10	0	9+1	0	0+0	0	0+0	0	0+0	0
	MF	(Scotland) SCO	Colin Cameron	26	1	20+2	1	2+0	0	1+0	0	1+0	0
	MF	(Scotland) SCO	Danny Mackay	0	0	0+0	0	0+0	0	0+0	0	0+0	0
	MF	(England) ENG	Lee Makel	3	0	1+2	0	0+0	0	0+0	0	0+0	0
	MF	(Scotland) SCO	Kyle Miller	6	0	2+3	0	0+0	0	0+0	0	0+1	0
	MF	(Scotland) SCO	Jordan Morton	20	6	12+6	6	0+0	0	1+0	0	1+0	0
	MF	(Scotland) SCO	Mark Ramsay	28	8	19+5	6	2+0	0	1+0	2	1+0	0
	MF	(Scotland) SCO	Jon Robertson	39	7	35+0	5	2+0	2	1+0	0	1+0	0
	MF	(Scotland) SCO	Craig Winter	12	0	3+6	0	0+1	0	1+0	0	1+0	0
	MF	(Scotland) SCO	Lewis Milne	8	0	3+4	0	0+0	0	0+0	0	0+1	0
	MF	(Scotland) SCO	Dean Brett	3	0	2+1	0	0+0	0	0+0	0	0+0	0
	FW	(Scotland) SCO	Lewis Coult	36	15	20+12	13	0+2	1	1+0	0	0+1	1
	FW	(Scotland) SCO	John Ferguson	1	0	1+0	0	0+0	0	0+0	0	0+0	0
	FW	(Scotland) SCO	Marc McKenzie	39	18	31+5	18	1+1	0	0+1	0	0+0	0
	FW	(Scotland) SCO	Greg Stewart	33	7	17+12	6	2+0	1	1+0	0	1+0	0
	FW	(Scotland) SCO	Kal Naismith	10	2	7+2	2	1+0	0	0+0	0	0+0	0
	FW	(Scotland) SCO	Derek Lyle	18	1	12+6	1	0+0	0	0+0	0	0+0	0
	FW	(Scotland) SCO	Liam Cusack	13	0	7+6	0	0+0	0	0+0	0	0+0	0

=== Disciplinary record ===
Includes all competitive matches.

Last updated 5 May 2012

Nation	Position	Name	Scottish Second Division		Scottish Cup		League Cup		Challenge Cup		Total	
Nation	Position	Name	Booked	Sent off (straight red)	Booked	Sent off (straight red)	Booked	Sent off (straight red)	Booked	Sent off (straight red)	Booked	Sent off (straight red)
(Scotland)	GK	Youssef Bejaoui	0	0	0	0	0	0	0	0	0	0
(England)	GK	Thomas Flynn	0	0	0	0	0	0	0	0	0	0
(Scotland)	DF	Kenny Adamson	12	1	0	0	0	0	1	0	13	1
(Scotland)	DF	John Armstrong	5	0	0	0	0	0	0	0	5	0
(Scotland)	DF	Steven Bennett	0	0	0	0	0	0	0	0	0	0
(Scotland)	DF	Dean Brett	2	0	0	0	0	0	0	0	2	0
(Scotland)	DF	Paul Byrne	1	0	0	0	0	0	0	0	1	0
(Scotland)	DF	Dene Droudge	0	0	0	0	0	0	0	0	0	0
(Scotland)	DF	Scott Linton	3	1	0	0	0	0	0	0	3	1
(Scotland)	DF	Joe Mbu	2	0	0	0	0	0	0	0	2	0
(Scotland)	DF	Thomas O'Brien	1	0	1	0	0	0	0	0	2	0
(England)	DF	David Cowan	3	0	0	0	0	0	0	0	3	0
(Scotland)	DF	Gary Fisher	2	0	0	0	0	0	0	0	2	0
(Scotland)	MF	Colin Cameron	3	0	1	0	0	0	0	0	4	0
(Scotland)	MF	Danny Mackay	0	0	0	0	0	0	0	0	0	0
(England)	MF	Lee Makel	0	0	0	0	0	0	0	0	0	0
(Scotland)	MF	Kyle Miller	0	0	0	0	0	0	0	0	0	0
(Scotland)	MF	Jordan Morton	5	0	0	0	0	0	0	0	5	0
(Scotland)	MF	Mark Ramsay	0	0	0	0	0	0	0	0	0	0
(Scotland)	MF	Jon Robertson	2	0	0	0	0	0	0	0	2	0
(Scotland)	MF	Craig Winter	1	0	0	0	0	0	0	0	1	0
(Scotland)	MF	Lewis Milne	0	0	0	0	0	0	0	0	0	0
(Scotland)	MF	Dean Brett	0	0	0	0	0	0	0	0	0	0
(Scotland)	FW	Lewis Coult	6	0	1	0	0	0	0	0	7	0
(Scotland)	FW	John Ferguson	0	0	0	0	0	0	0	0	0	0
(Scotland)	FW	Marc McKenzie	1	0	0	0	0	0	0	0	1	0
(Scotland)	FW	Greg Stewart	1	0	0	0	0	0	0	0	1	0
(Scotland)	FW	Kal Naismith	1	0	0	0	0	0	0	0	1	0
(Scotland)	FW	Derek Lyle	2	0	0	0	0	0	0	0	2	0
(Scotland)	FW	Liam Cusack	0	0	0	0	0	0	0	0	0	0

=== Awards ===
Last updated 28 March 2012

Nation	Name	Award	Month
(Scotland)	Colin Cameron	Second Division Manager of the Month	September
(Scotland)	Colin Cameron	Second Division Manager of the Month	November
(Scotland)	Lewis Coult	Ginger Boot Award	February
(Scotland)	Colin Cameron	Second Division Manager of the Season	IRN-BRU SFL End of Season Awards

== Team statistics ==
=== League table ===
Pos	Team	Pld	W	D	L	GF	GA	GD	Pts	Promotion, qualification or relegation
1	Cowdenbeath (C, P)	36	20	11	5	68	29	+39	71	Promotion to the First Division
2	Arbroath	36	17	12	7	76	51	+25	63	Qualification for the First Division play-offs
3	Dumbarton (O, P)	36	17	7	12	61	61	0	58 (Note: Dumbarton won the First Division play-off final, and were promoted to the First Division.)	Qualification for the First Division play-offs
4	Airdrie United (P)	36	14	10	12	68	60	+8	52 (Note: Airdrie United lost the final of the First Division playoffs to Dumbarton. However following the demotion of Rangers to the third division prior to the beginning of the 2012-13 season, Dundee were promoted from the First Division to the SPL, and Airdrie United were promoted to the First Division to take their place. Stranraer were promoted from the Third to the Second Division to take the place of Airdrie United)	Qualification for the First Division play-offs
5	Stenhousemuir	36	15	6	15	54	49	+5	51	

Source: SPFL Archive
Rules for classification: 1) points; 2) goal difference; 3) number of goals scored.
(C) Champions; (O) Play-off winners; (P) Promoted

== Transfers ==
=== Players in ===
Player	From	Fee
(Scotland) Youssef Bejaoui	(Scotland) Whitehill Welfare	Free
(England) Thomas Flynn	(Scotland) Hibernian	Free
(Scotland) Jordan Morton	(Scotland) Heart of Midlothian	Loan
(Scotland) Kal Naismith	(Scotland) Rangers	Loan
(England) David Cowan	(Scotland) Livingston	Free
(Scotland) Liam Cusack	(Scotland) Clyde	Undisclosed
(Scotland) Derek Lyle	(Scotland) Hamilton Academical	Free
(Scotland) Gary Fisher	(Scotland) Kilmarnock	Loan

=== Players out ===
Player	To	Fee
(Scotland) David Hay	(Scotland) Linlithgow Rose	Free
(Scotland) Richard Vauls	(Northern Ireland) Coleraine	Free
(Scotland) Robert Malcolm	Free Agent	Free
(Scotland) Stevie Crawford	(Scotland) Forfar Athletic	Free
(Scotland) John Dempster	(Scotland) Glenafton Athletic	Free
(Scotland) Mark Baxter	(Scotland) Arbroath	Free
(France) Ludovic Roy	(Scotland) Raith Rovers	Free
(Scotland) John Ferguson	(Scotland) Vale of Leithen	Loan
(Scotland) Steven Bennett	(Scotland) Bo'ness United	Loan
(Scotland) Dene Droudge	(Scotland) Dundonald Bluebell	Loan
(Scotland) Craig Winter	(Scotland) East Stirlingshire	Loan
(Scotland) Jamie Pyper	(Scotland) Oakley United	Loan
(Scotland) Daniel Hall	(Scotland) Ballingry Rovers	Loan
(Scotland) John Ferguson	(Scotland) Berwick Rangers	Free
(Scotland) Craig Winter	(Scotland) Hill of Beath Hawthorn	Free
(Scotland) Youssef Bejaoui	(Scotland) Berwick Rangers	Loan
(Scotland) Jack Nicholson	(Scotland) Dundonald Bluebell	Loan
(Scotland) Michael Fleming	(Scotland) Ballingry Rovers	Loan
