= 2006–07 Scottish Football League =

Scottish football season

Statistics of the Scottish Football League in season 2006–07.

== Scottish First Division ==
=== League standings ===
Pos	Team	Pld	W	D	L	GF	GA	GD	Pts	Promotion, qualification or relegation
1	Gretna (C, P)	36	19	9	8	70	40	+30	66	Promotion to the Premier League
2	St Johnstone	36	19	8	9	65	42	+23	65	
3	Dundee	36	16	5	15	48	42	+6	53	
4	Hamilton Academical	36	14	11	11	46	47	−1	53	
5	Clyde	36	11	14	11	46	35	+11	47	
6	Livingston	36	11	12	13	41	46	−5	45	
7	Partick Thistle	36	12	9	15	47	63	−16	45	
8	Queen of the South	36	10	11	15	34	54	−20	41	
9	Airdrie United (R)	36	11	7	18	39	50	−11	40	Qualification for the First Division Play-offs
10	Ross County (R)	36	9	10	17	40	57	−17	37	Relegation to the Second Division

Source: "2006-2007 First Division - SPFL Archive". SPFL.
Rules for classification: 1) points; 2) goal difference; 3) number of goals scored.
(C) Champions; (P) Promoted; (R) Relegated

=== Top scorers ===
Scorer	Team	Goals
(Scotland) Colin McMenamin	Gretna	24
(Trinidad and Tobago) Jason Scotland	St Johnstone	18
(Scotland) Mark Roberts	Partick Thistle	15
(England) Richard Offiong	Hamilton Accies	14
(Scotland) Martin Hardie	St Johnstone	12
(Scotland) Derek Lyle	Dundee	12
(Scotland) Gary Arbuckle	Clyde	10
(Scotland) Gary Twigg	Airdrie Utd	10
(Scotland) Stephen Dobbie	Queen of the South	8
(Scotland) Steven Masterton	Clyde	8
(Scotland) Steven Milne	St Johnstone	8
(Scotland) John O'Neill	Queen of the South	8
(Scotland) Steve Tosh	Queen of the South	8
(Scotland) Don Cowie	Ross County	7
(Scotland) Steven Craig	Livingston	7

== Scottish Second Division ==
=== League standings ===
Pos	Team	Pld	W	D	L	GF	GA	GD	Pts	Promotion, qualification or relegation
1	Greenock Morton (C, P)	36	24	5	7	76	32	+44	77	Promotion to the First Division
2	Stirling Albion (P)	36	21	6	9	67	39	+28	69	Qualification for the First Division Play-offs (Note: The 2nd, 3rd and 4th placed teams will be entered into a play-off with the First Division's 9th placed team. The winning team were awarded a place in the 2007–08 First Division, Airdrie United were relegated and Stirling Albion were promoted.)
3	Raith Rovers	36	18	8	10	50	33	+17	62	Qualification for the First Division Play-offs
4	Brechin City	36	18	6	12	61	45	+16	60	Qualification for the First Division Play-offs
5	Ayr United	36	14	8	14	46	47	−1	50	
6	Cowdenbeath	36	13	6	17	59	56	+3	45	
7	Alloa Athletic	36	11	9	16	47	70	−23	42	
8	Peterhead	36	11	8	17	60	62	−2	41	
9	Stranraer (R)	36	10	9	17	45	74	−29	39	Qualification for the Second Division Play-offs (Note: The 9th placed team were entered into a play-off with the Third Division's 2nd, 3rd and 4th placed teams. The winning team were awarded a place in the 2007–08 Second Division, Stranraer were relegated and Queen's Park were promoted.)
10	Forfar Athletic (R)	36	4	7	25	37	90	−53	19	Relegation to the Third Division

Source: "2006–2007 Second Division - SPFL Archive". SPFL (in Malay).
Rules for classification: 1) points; 2) goal difference; 3) number of goals scored.
(C) Champions; (P) Promoted; (R) Relegated

=== Top scorers ===
Scorer	Goals	Team
(Scotland) Iain Russell	21	Brechin City
(Scotland) Liam Buchanan	20	Cowdenbeath
(England) Peter Weatherson	15	Greenock Morton
(Scotland) Colin Cramb	14	Stirling Albion
(Scotland) Pat Clarke	13	Cowdenbeath
(Scotland) Michael Moore	13	Stranraer
(Scotland) Bobby Linn	12	Greenock Morton
(Scotland) Chris Templeman	12	Greenock Morton
(Scotland) Martin Bavidge	11	Peterhead
(Scotland) Darren Gribben	11	Forfar Athletic
(Scotland) Paul McGowan	11	Greenock Morton

== Scottish Third Division ==
=== League standings ===
Pos	Team	Pld	W	D	L	GF	GA	GD	Pts	Promotion or qualification
1	Berwick Rangers (C, P)	36	24	3	9	51	29	+22	75	Promotion to the Second Division
2	Arbroath	36	22	4	10	61	33	+28	70	Qualification for the Second Division Play-offs (Note: The 2nd, 3rd and 4th placed teams will be entered into a play-off with the Second Division's 9th placed team. The winning team will be awarded a place in the 2007–08 Second Division, Stranraer were relegated and Queen's Park were promoted.)
3	Queen's Park (O, P)	36	21	5	10	57	28	+29	68	Qualification for the Second Division Play-offs
4	East Fife	36	20	7	9	59	37	+22	67	Qualification for the Second Division Play-offs
5	Dumbarton	36	18	5	13	52	37	+15	59	
6	Albion Rovers	36	14	6	16	56	61	−5	48	
7	Stenhousemuir	36	13	5	18	53	63	−10	44	
8	Montrose	36	11	4	21	42	62	−20	37	
9	Elgin City	36	9	2	25	39	69	−30	29	
10	East Stirlingshire	36	6	3	27	27	78	−51	21	

Source: Soccerway
Rules for classification: 1) points; 2) goal difference; 3) number of goals scored.
(C) Champions; (O) Play-off winners; (P) Promoted

=== Top scorers ===
Rank	Scorer	Goals	Team
1	(Scotland) Scott Chaplain	18	Albion Rovers
1	(Scotland) Martin Johnston	18	Elgin City
3	(Scotland) David Weatherston	16	Queen's Park
4	(Scotland) Craig O'Reilly	13	East Fife
5	(Scotland) Mark Ferry	11	Queen's Park
6	(Scotland) Stephen Dobbie	10	Dumbarton
6	(Scotland) Neil Jablonski	10	East Fife
6	(Scotland) Andy Rogers	10	Montrose
6	(Scotland) Pat Walker	10	Albion Rovers
6	(Scotland) Gary Wood	10	Berwick Rangers

== See also ==
- 2006–07 in Scottish football
