= Craig Winter =

Scottish footballer (born 1976)

Personal information
- Full name: Craig John Winter
- Date of birth: 30 June 1976 (age 50)
- Place of birth: Dunfermline, Scotland
- Height: 1.75 m (5 ft 9 in)
- Position: Midfielder

Team information
- Current team: Hearts Of Beath (manager)

Youth career
- Wellwood Boys Club
- Inverkeithing United
- Lochgelly Albert Colts
- Hutchison Vale
- Hibernian
- –1994: Raith Rovers

Senior career*
Years	Team	Apps	(Gls)
1994–2004	Cowdenbeath	286	(27)
2003–2006	Brechin City	55	(4)
2005–2007	Dumbarton	43	(6)
2007–2008	Raith Rovers	26	(0)
2008–2010	Forfar Athletic	34	(1)
2009–2012	Cowdenbeath	71	(0)
2011	→ East Stirlingshire (loan)	4	(0)
2012	Hill of Beath Hawthorn		
2012	Ballingry Rovers		
2012–2013	Glenrothes		

Managerial career
- –2016: Cowdenbeath U20
- 2016: Burntisland Shipyard
- 2020–: Hearts Of Beath
- * Club domestic league appearances and goals

Craig John Winter (born 30 June 1976) is a Scottish retired footballer who made over 240 appearances in the Scottish League for Cowdenbeath as a midfielder. He also played League football for Brechin City, Dumbarton, Raith Rovers, Forfar Athletic and East Stirlingshire. After retiring as a player, he entered coaching and management.

== Career statistics ==
Appearances and goals by club, season and competition
Club	Season	League			Scottish Cup		League Cup		Other		Total	
Club	Season	Division	Apps	Goals	Apps	Goals	Apps	Goals	Apps	Goals	Apps	Goals
Cowdenbeath	1996–97	Scottish Third Division	3	3	2	0	0	0	0	0	5	2
Cowdenbeath	1997–98	Scottish Third Division	27	3	2	1	0	0	1 (Note: Appearances in Scottish Challenge Cup)	0	30	4
Cowdenbeath	1998–99	Scottish Third Division	25	2	1	0	1	0	0	0	27	2
Cowdenbeath	1999-00	Scottish Third Division	32	5	1	0	1	0	0	0	34	5
Cowdenbeath	2000–01	Scottish Third Division	34	6	2	1	2	0	2	0	40	7
Cowdenbeath	2001–02	Scottish Second Division	25	1	1	0	1	0	1	0	28	1
Cowdenbeath	2002–03	Scottish Second Division	30	1	3	1	2	0	1	0	36	2
Cowdenbeath	2003–04	Scottish Third Division	21	2	3	1	2	0	1	0	27	3
Cowdenbeath	Total		178	17	15	4	9	0	6	0	208	21
Brechin City	2003–04	Scottish First Division	10	2	—		—		—		10	2
Brechin City	2004–05	Scottish Second Division	26	2	3	1	2	0	1	0	32	3
Brechin City	2005–06	Scottish First Division	18	0	1	0	0	0	1	0	20	0
Brechin City	Total		54	4	4	1	2	0	2	0	62	5
Dumbarton	2005–06	Scottish Second Division	12	0	—		—		—		12	0
Dumbarton	2006–07	Scottish Third Division	30	6	2	0	0	0	1	0	33	6
Dumbarton	Total		42	6	2	0	0	0	1	0	45	6
Raith Rovers	2007–08	Scottish Second Division	24	0	2	0	2	0	1	0	29	0
Forfar Athletic	2008–09	Scottish Third Division	33	1	2	0	1	0	1	0	37	1
Forfar Athletic	2009–10	Scottish Third Division	1	0	0	0	1	0	0	0	2	0
Forfar Athletic	Total		34	1	2	0	2	0	1	0	39	1
Cowdenbeath	2009–10	Scottish Second Division	29	0	0	0	—		3 (Note: Appearances in Scottish First Division play-offs)	0	32	0
Cowdenbeath	2010–11	Scottish First Division	30	0	0	0	0	0	0	0	30	0
Cowdenbeath	2011–12	Scottish Second Division	9	0	0	0	1	0	1	0	11	0
Cowdenbeath	Total		246	17	15	4	10	0	10	0	281	21
East Stirlingshire (loan)	2011–12	Scottish Third Division	4	0	—		—		—		4	0
Career total			404	28	25	5	16	0	15	0	460	33

== Honours ==
Cowdenbeath

- Scottish League First Division play-offs: 2009–10
- Scottish League Second Division: 2011–12
- Scottish League Third Division second-place promotion: 2000–01

Brechin City

- Scottish League Second Division: 2004–05

Individual

- Cowdenbeath Hall of Fame
