= Lewis Coult =

English footballer (born 1988)

Personal information
- Full name: Lewis Coult
- Date of birth: 7 June 1988 (age 38)
- Place of birth: Edinburgh, Scotland
- Position: Forward

Team information
- Current team: Penicuik Athletic (Manager)

Youth career
- Heart of Midlothian
- Hamilton Academical

Senior career*
Years	Team	Apps	(Gls)
2006–2007	Hamilton Academical	1	(0)
2007	→ Alloa Athletic (loan)	9	(0)
2007–2008	Berwick Rangers	7	(0)
- Leith Athletic
2010–2011	Arniston Rangers		
2011–2013	Cowdenbeath	56	(18)
2013–2014	Airdrieonians	21	(6)
2014–2015	Stirling Albion	24	(3)
2015	Arbroath	1	(0)
2015–????	Newtongrange Star		

Managerial career
- 2022–2023: Edinburgh United
- 2023–: Penicuik Athletic
- * Club domestic league appearances and goals as of 28 May 2014

Lewis Coult (born 7 June 1988) is a Scottish professional football forward, who is former manager of Penicuik Athletic.

== Career ==
Coult was born in Edinburgh, where he grew up supporting Hearts with whom he began his career as a youth player. He then joined Hamilton Academical where he made his senior debut aged 17, on 2 January 2006, in the Scottish First Division against Airdrie United. He went on loan to Alloa Athletic before joining Berwick Rangers. Coult came off the bench to set two goals up for strike partner Iain Diack in a League One game with Alloa however found himself released at the end of Berwick's miserable season.

A three-month spell in Florida with Miami All-Stars, followed by a brief spell in the E.A.D.S.A.F.A division in the Edinburgh Amateur leagues. This was also followed by Junior football with Leith Athletic and Arniston Rangers.

On 4 January 2011, Coult signed for Scottish First Division side Cowdenbeath. He made his debut on 15 January 2011, in a 3–0 defeat to Greenock Morton. He scored his first goal for the club on 11 May in a 2–2 draw with Brechin City in the play-offs, but were ultimately relegated after a 2–0 defeat in the second leg. In all he made 19 appearances scoring once in his debut season. Coult signed a new contract in January 2012 extending his stay to May 2013. He left the club in May 2013 and signed a one-year deal with Airdrieonians. Despite scoring 6 league goals, Coult left Airdrieonians in May 2014.

On 28 May 2015 Coult join Arbroath.

On 31 Aug 2015 Coult left Arbroath, by mutual consent.

== Career statistics ==
As of 24 March 2012

Club statistics
Club	Season	League		Scottish Cup		League Cup		Other		Total	
Club	Season	App	Goals	App	Goals	App	Goals	App	Goals	App	Goals
Hamilton Academical	2005–06	1	0	0	0	0	0	0	0	1	0
Alloa Athletic	2006–07	9	0	0	0	0	0	0	0	9	0
Berwick Rangers	2007–08	7	0	0	0	0	0	0	0	7	0
Cowdenbeath	2010–11	17	0	0	0	0	0	2	1	19	1
Cowdenbeath	2011–12	27	12	2	1	1	0	1	1	31	14
Total		61	12	2	1	1	0	3	2	67	15

== Managerial statistics ==
As of 11 August 2024

Managerial record by team and tenure
Team	From	To	Record				
Team	From	To	P	W	D	L	Win %
Edinburgh United	June 2022	July 2023	38	9	6	23	23.7
Penicuik Athletic	July 2023	Present	42	17	5	20	40.5
