= Jordan Morton =

Scottish footballer (born 1992)

Personal information
- Full name: Jordan John George Morton
- Date of birth: 25 April 1992 (age 34)
- Place of birth: Glasgow, Scotland
- Position: Winger

Youth career
- –2009: Clyde
- 2009–2011: Heart of Midlothian

Senior career*
Years	Team	Apps	(Gls)
2011–2012	Heart of Midlothian	0	(0)
2011–2012	→ Cowdenbeath (loan)	17	(6)
2012–2013	Livingston	24	(3)
2013–2014	Cowdenbeath	24	(3)
2014–2015	Lokomotiv Plovdiv	?	(?)
2015–2016	Airdrieonians	9	(1)
2016	→ Annan Athletic (loan)	1	(0)
2016–2017	Shettleston	?	(?)
2017	Cumnock Juniors	?	(?)
2017–2019	Cambuslang Rangers	?	(?)
2019-2020	Pollok	20	(4)
2020-2021	Troon		
2021-2022	Albion Rovers	5	(1)
- * Club domestic league appearances and goals as of 10 July 2020

Jordan Morton (born 25 April 1992) is a Scottish professional footballer who last played as a winger for Albion Rovers in Scottish League Two.

He has previously played for Heart of Midlothian, Lokomotiv Plovdiv, Livingston and Airdrieonians.

== Career ==
=== Hearts ===
Morton progressed through the youth ranks at Clyde, before signing for Hearts in 2009 at under 17 level. In July 2011 Morton joined Cowdenbeath to gain first team experience. On his return he made his debut on 7 January 2012 as a half time substitute in the Scottish Cup. On 21 May 2012, after just one appearance for the club, he was released.

==== Cowdenbeath (loan) ====
On 15 July 2011, Morton joined Cowdenbeath on a six-month loan deal after impressing as a trialist during pre season, scoring in a friendly against parent club Hearts. He made his debut on 23 July 2011, against Raith Rovers in the Challenge Cup, with his Scottish Second Division debut coming on 6 August 2011 against Forfar Athletic at Station Park. His first league goal came in the following game in their 3–1 over Brechin City scoring the winner in the 80th minute. In all he made 19 appearances scoring six times with his last game coming on 2 January 2012 against East Fife scoring a goal from 30 yards out. Cowdenbeath requested his loan be extended until the end of the season, however this was rejected by Hearts.

=== Livingston ===
On 1 June 2012, Morton signed a one-year contract with Scottish First Division side Livingston. He made his debut on 28 July against Annan in the Challenge Cup, going on to score his first goals for the club on 4 July, in a League Cup match against Stranraer scoring a brace in an 8–0 win. Morton made his league debut on 11 August against Greenock Morton. Morton left Livingston in May 2013 after the end of his contract.

=== Cowdenbeath return ===
After being released by Livingston, Morton re-signed for Cowdenbeath permanently in May 2013 on a one-year contract.

=== Lokomotiv Plovdiv ===
In July 2014, Morton signed for Bulgarian club Lokomotiv Plovdiv.

=== Airdrieonians & Annan Athletic ===
After less than a year in Bulgaria, Morton returned to Scotland, signing for Airdrieonians in February 2015, and in January 2016, Morton moved on loan to Scottish League Two side Annan Athletic until the end of the season. He was released by Airdrie in May 2016.

=== Into the Juniors ===
After leaving Airdrie, Morton continued his nomadic career by joining Junior club Shettleston where he played for a season, before a short time at Cumnock Juniors. He then moved to current club Cambuslang Rangers where he has been since March 2017. He left for Pollok in January 2019 and left upon expiry of his contract in June 2020.

=== Troon ===
Morton signed for Troon to play alongside his former Hearts team-mates Ryan Stevenson and Christian Nade for their debut season in the West of Scotland Football League on 10 July 2020.

=== Albion Rovers ===
Morton signed with Scottish league 2 side Albion Rovers in October 2021. He made his debut v Elgin City as a substitute marking the occasion with a goal. He left the club in 2022.

== Career statistics ==
As of 29 July 2014

Club	Season	League		Scottish Cup		League Cup		Other		Total	
Club	Season	App	Goals	App	Goals	App	Goals	App	Goals	App	Goals
Heart of Midlothian	2011–12	0	0	1	0	0	0	0	0	1	0
Cowdenbeath (loan)	2011–12	17	6	0	0	1	0	1	0	19	6
Livingston	2012–13	24	3	1	0	3	2	1	0	29	5
Cowdenbeath	2013–14	24	3	1	0	2	0	1	0	28	3
Lokomotiv Plovdiv	2014–15	0	0	0	0	0	0	0	0	0	0
Total		65	12	3	0	6	2	3	0	77	14
