= Jack Nicholson (footballer) =

Australian rules footballer (1892–1967)

Personal information
- Full name: John Nicholson
- Born: 24 June 1892
- Died: 27 September 1967 (aged 75)
- Height: 178 cm (5 ft 10 in)
- Weight: 69 kg (152 lb)

Playing career^{1}
Years	Club	Games (Goals)
1912	University	1 (0)
1913	Melbourne	1 (0)
Total		2 (0)
- ^{1} Playing statistics correct to the end of 1913.

John Nicholson (24 June 1892 – 27 September 1967) was an Australian rules footballer who played with University and Melbourne. As with many other University players, he moved to Melbourne, although his transition was not as successful as most other players.

== Sources ==
Holmesby, Russell & Main, Jim (2007). The Encyclopedia of AFL Footballers. 7th ed. Melbourne: Bas Publishing.
