= Steve Renicks =

Scottish footballer

Personal information
- Full name: Steven John Renicks
- Date of birth: 28 November 1975 (age 50)
- Place of birth: Bellshill, Scotland
- Position: Defender

Youth career
- Hamilton Accies BC

Senior career*
Years	Team	Apps	(Gls)
1993–2002	Hamilton Academical	198	(4)
2002–2003	Stranraer	2	(0)
2002–2004	Queen of the South	4	(1)
2003–2004	Dumbarton	18	(0)
- * Club domestic league appearances and goals

Steven John Renicks (born 28 November 1975) is a Scottish former footballer, who played 'senior' for Hamilton Academical, Stranraer, Queen of the South and Dumbarton.
