= Isaac English =

Scottish footballer

Personal information
- Date of birth: 12 November 1971 (age 54)
- Place of birth: Paisley, Scotland
- Position: Forward

Senior career*
Years	Team	Apps	(Gls)
1987–1989	St Mirren	0	(0)
1989–1995	Partick Thistle	105	(15)
1995–1996	St Johnstone	10	(0)
1996–1997	Ayr United	18	(7)
1997–1999	Stranraer	21	(2)
1999–2000	Partick Thistle	14	(1)
2000–2002	Stenhousemuir	63	(23)
2002–2003	Hamilton Academical	0	(0)
2003–2004	Dumbarton	9	(1)
Total		240	(49)
- * Club domestic league appearances and goals

Isaac English (born 12 November 1971) is a Scottish former professional footballer.

A forward, English began his career with St Mirren in the 1980s. He was unable to break into the first team and moved to Partick Thistle in 1989. He made over 100 league appearances for the Jags and scored fifteen goals in six years.

He went on to play for six other clubs – including a return to Partick in 1999 – before hanging up his boots with Dumbarton in 2004.
