= David Bagan =

Scottish footballer

Personal information
- Date of birth: 26 April 1977 (age 49)
- Place of birth: Irvine, Scotland
- Position: Midfielder

Senior career*
Years	Team	Apps	(Gls)
1994–1996	Troon		
1996–2000	Kilmarnock	32	(0)
2000–2003	Inverness Caledonian Thistle	64	(10)
2003–2005	Queen of the South	52	(2)
2004–2005	→ St Johnstone (loan)	6	(0)
2005–2006	Raith Rovers	10	(0)
2005–2006	→ Irvine Meadow (loan)		
2006–2007	Dumbarton	28	(3)
2007–2008	Hurlford United		

International career
1996–1998	Scotland Under-21	4	(0)
- * Club domestic league appearances and goals

David Bagan (born 26 April 1977) is a Scottish former football player who played as a winger.

Bagan began his career at Troon before signing for Kilmarnock, where he won the Scottish Cup in 1997. He joined Inverness Caledonian Thistle in 2000 after being released by Kilmarnock, then signed for Queen of the South in 2003 after again being released. He also played St Johnstone, Raith Rovers, Dumbarton and Irvine Meadow. He signed for Hurlford United in January 2009. He also represented the Scotland under-21 national team.

== Honours ==
Kilmarnock:

- Scottish Cup: 1997
