= Jamie Smith (footballer, born 1978) =

Scottish footballer

Personal information
- Date of birth: 11 July 1978 (age 48)
- Place of birth: Glasgow, Scotland
- Position: Defender

Youth career
- Queen's Park

Senior career*
Years	Team	Apps	(Gls)
1996–1998	Queen's Park	8	(0)
1998–1999	East Stirling	28	(0)
1998–2000	Stranraer	36	(7)
2000–2002	Partick Thistle	32	(2)
2001–2005	Brechin City	100	(11)
2005–2007	Dumbarton	37	(2)
2007–2008	Stenhousemuir	10	(0)
- * Club domestic league appearances and goals

James Smith (born 11 July 1978) is a Scottish footballer who played 'senior' for Queen's Park, East Stirling, Stranraer, Partick Thistle, Brechin City, Dumbarton and Stenhousemuir.
