= David McNaught (footballer) =

Scottish footballer

Personal information
- Full name: David Andrew McNaught
- Date of birth: 24 March 1988 (age 38)
- Place of birth: Alexandria, Scotland
- Position: Forward

Youth career
- Clyde Youth

Senior career*
| Years | Team | Apps | (Gls) |
| 2004–2005 | Clyde | | |
| 2005–2008 | Dumbarton | 52 | (4) |
- * Club domestic league appearances and goals

David Andrew McNaught (born 24 March 1988) is a Scottish footballer who played 'senior' for Clyde and Dumbarton.
