= James McKinstry =

Scottish footballer

Personal information
- Full name: James McKinstry
- Date of birth: 3 July 1979 (age 47)
- Place of birth: Glasgow, Scotland
- Positions: Defender; midfielder

Senior career*
| Years | Team | Apps | (Gls) |
| 1997–2001 | Clydebank | 74 | (2) |
| 2001–2003 | Partick Thistle | 29 | (2) |
| 2003–2005 | Dumbarton | 68 | (2) |
| 2005–2007 | Ayr United | 29 | (0) |
| 2007–2009 | Stranraer | 59 | (1) |
| 2009–2010 | Petershill | | |
| 2010–2016 | Vale of Clyde | | |
| Total | | 260 | (7) |
- * Club domestic league appearances and goals as of 23:50, 25 February 2010 (UTC)

James McKinstry (born 3 July 1979 in Glasgow) is a Scottish former footballer, who notably played for Clydebank and Partick Thistle.

McKinstry was a defender who could play anywhere at the back as well as in midfield, and has a vast wealth of experience in the Scottish Football League, having played for Clydebank, Partick Thistle, Dumbarton and Ayr United, before moving to Stair Park to join Stranraer in the summer of 2007. He then turned out for the reformed Clydebank as a trialist, before signing with Petershill and then Vale of Clyde in the junior grade including an appearance in goal for the Vale as well as a testimonial against a Celtic XI in which he managed to miss a penalty during a 6–0 defeat.
