= Kevin McCann (footballer, born 1980) =

Scottish footballer

Personal information
- Date of birth: 17 December 1980 (age 45)
- Place of birth: Bellshill, Scotland
- Position: Defender

Youth career
- Partick Thistle BC

Senior career*
Years	Team	Apps	(Gls)
1998–2000	Partick Thistle	2	(0)
1999–2000	Dumbarton - loan	3	(0)
1999–2000	East Stirlingshire	7	(0)
2000–2003	Dumbarton	52	(3)
2003	East Stirlingshire	15	(0)
- * Club domestic league appearances and goals

Kevin McCann (born 17 December 1980) is a Scottish former footballer who played for Partick Thistle, Dumbarton and East Stirlingshire.

In May 2003 he had to play in goal against Albion Rovers after three previous East Stirlingshire goalkeepers had either gone off injured or were sent off. After going in goal he saved a penalty from Jered Stirling.
