= Ian Dobbins =

Scottish footballer

Personal information
- Full name: Ian Alexander Dobbins
- Date of birth: 24 August 1983 (age 43)
- Place of birth: Bellshill, Scotland
- Position: Midfielder

Senior career*
Years	Team	Apps	(Gls)
1999–2001	Albion Rovers	1	(0)
2001–2003	Hamilton Academical	33	(2)
2003–2006	Dumbarton	43	(0)
2005–2007	Arbroath	62	(3)
2007–2008	Montrose	20	(1)
2007–2009	Stranraer	31	(2)
2008–2010	Arbroath	26	(1)
- * Club domestic league appearances and goals

Ian Alexander Dobbins (born 24 August 1983) is a Scottish former footballer, who played for Albion Rovers, Hamilton Academical, Dumbarton, Arbroath, Montrose and Stranraer.
