= Chris Gentile =

Scottish footballer

Personal information
- Full name: Christopher Gentile
- Date of birth: 9 September 1981 (age 45)
- Place of birth: Glasgow, Scotland
- Position: Midfielder

Youth career
- Dundee United BC

Senior career*
Years	Team	Apps	(Gls)
1999–2008	Dumbarton	62	(5)
- * Club domestic league appearances and goals

Christoper Gentile (born 9 September 1981) is a Scottish former footballer. He first signed 'senior' with Dundee United from their Youth set up but was unable to break through into the 'first' team. He then transferred to Dumbarton where he played for two seasons, but having failed to hold down a regular place in the team, he joined the 'junior' ranks, with Kilsyth Rangers. Four seasons later he rejoined Dumbarton, and in 2008 returned to the 'junior' ranks with Kirkintilloch Rob Roy.
