= Paul McQuilken =

Scottish footballer

Personal information
- Date of birth: 22 June 1981 (age 45)
- Place of birth: Glasgow, Scotland
- Position: Forward

Youth career
- Kilsyth Rangers

Senior career*
Years	Team	Apps	(Gls)
2005–2008	Dumbarton	67	(7)
- * Club domestic league appearances and goals

Paul McQuilken (born 22 June 1981) is a Scottish former footballer who began his career playing with junior side Kilsyth Rangers. Thereafter he signed 'senior' with Dumbarton where he played regularly for three seasons.
