= Ryan Borris =

Scottish footballer

Personal information
- Full name: Ryan Edward Borris
- Date of birth: 7 June 1979 (age 47)
- Place of birth: Paisley, Scotland
- Position: Forward

Senior career*
Years	Team	Apps	(Gls)
2004–2007	Dumbarton	75	(7)
2007–2008	Raith Rovers	27	(1)
2008–2010	Ayr United	56	(3)
2010–2011	Stirling Albion	27	(2)
2011–2012	Dumbarton	16	(0)
2012–2014	Stranraer	61	(3)
2014–2015	Kilbirnie Ladeside		
2015–2016	Hurlford United		
2016–2018	Glenafton Athletic		
2018-2021	Renfrew		
- * Club domestic league appearances and goals

Ryan Edward Borris (born 7 June 1983) is a Scottish former footballer who last played for Renfrew in the West of Scotland Football League.

He has previously played in the Scottish Football League First Division for Ayr United and also played 'senior' for Dumbarton, Raith Rovers, Stirling Albion and Stranraer.

After leaving Stranraer, Borris joined Junior side Kilbirnie Ladeside in June 2014. He later had a season at Hurlford United before moving to Glenafton Athletic in July 2016.

He then finished his career with lower league side Renfrew.
