= Graham Connell =

Scottish footballer

Personal information
- Date of birth: 31 October 1974 (age 52)
- Place of birth: Glasgow, Scotland
- Position: Midfielder

Youth career
- 1991–1995: Ipswich Town

Senior career*
Years	Team	Apps	(Gls)
1995–1998	Clydebank	90	(4)
1998–1999	Partick Thistle	33	(1)
1999–2001	Queen's Park	43	(1)
2000–2002	Queen of the South	48	(2)
2002–2005	Berwick Rangers	77	(0)
2005–2006	Dumbarton	27	(1)
2006–2007	Stenhousemuir	6	(0)
Total		324	(9)
- * Club domestic league appearances and goals

Graham Connell (born 31 October 1974) is a Scottish footballer who played 'senior' for Clydebank, Partick Thistle, Queen's Park, Queen of the South, Berwick Rangers, Dumbarton and Stenhousemuir.

In 1989 he was pictured, as Young Footballer of the Year, with footballing legend Pele at Hampden Park.
