= Kevin Gaughan (footballer) =

Scottish footballer (born 1978)

Personal information
- Date of birth: 6 March 1978 (age 48)
- Place of birth: Glasgow, Scotland
- Position: Defender

Youth career
- Ipswich Town

Senior career*
Years	Team	Apps	(Gls)
1997–1999	Partick Thistle	41	(2)
1999–2001	Raith Rovers	10	(0)
2000–2001	Stirling Albion	26	(1)
2001–2003	Stranraer	46	(1)
2003–2004	Stenhousemuir	15	(0)
2003–2006	Stranraer	32	(4)
2005–2006	Dumbarton	26	(1)
2006–2007	Stranraer	1	(0)
- * Club domestic league appearances and goals

Kevin Gaughan (born 6 March 1978) is a Scottish footballer who played 'senior' for Partick Thistle, Raith Rovers, Stirling Albion, Stranraer, Stenhousemuir and Dumbarton.
