= 2006–07 Scottish Third Division =

Scottish Football League Third Division
- Season: 2006–07
- Champions: Berwick Rangers
- Promoted: Berwick Rangers; Queen's Park
- Relegated: n/a
- Matches: 180
- Goals: 497 (2.76 per match)
- Top goalscorer: Scott Chaplain (18); Martin Johnston (18)
- Biggest home win: Six games by 5 goals^{[A]}
- Biggest away win: Montrose 0–5 Dumbarton (23 December 2006)
- Highest scoring: Albion Rovers 6–2 Elgin City (20 January 2007); Stenhousemuir 3–5 East Fife (14 April 2007)
- Longest winning run: 8 games Berwick Rangers; Queen's Park
- Longest unbeaten run: 13 games Arbroath
- Longest winless run: 17 games East Stirlingshire
- Longest losing run: 11 games East Stirlingshire

The 2006–07 Scottish Football League Third Division was the 13th season in the format of ten teams in the fourth-tier of Scottish football. The season started on 4 August 2006 and ended on 28 April 2007. Berwick Rangers finished top and were promoted alongside Queen's Park as play-off winners.

East Stirlingshire finished bottom of the table for the fifth consecutive season. Despite finishing bottom again, East Stirlingshire won their battle to retain full member status of the Scottish Football League, though were warned that they would lose their status if they finished bottom in the following season.

== Teams for 2006–07 ==
Location of teams in 2006–07 Scottish Third Division

Cowdenbeath as champions of the 2005–06 season were directly promoted to the 2006–07 Scottish Second Division. They were replaced by Dumbarton who finished bottom of the 2005–06 Scottish Second Division.

A second promotion place was available via a play-off tournament between the ninth-placed team of the 2005–06 Scottish Second Division, Alloa Athletic, and the sides ranked second, third and fourth in the 2005–06 Scottish Third Division, Berwick Rangers, Stenhousemuir and Arbroath respectively. The play off was won by Alloa Athletic who defeated Berwick Rangers in the final. Alloa Athletic therefore retained their Second Division status.

=== Overview ===
Relegated from Second Division to Third Division

- Dumbarton

Promoted from Third Division to Second Division

- Cowdenbeath

== Stadia and attendances ==
| Team | Stadium | Average | Highest |
|---|---|---|---|
| Arbroath | Gayfield Park | 730 | 1,250 |
| Albion Rovers | Cliftonhill | 431 | 619 |
| Berwick Rangers | Shielfield Park | 565 | 2,054 |
| Dumbarton | Strathclyde Homes Stadium | 709 | 1,089 |
| East Fife | Bayview Stadium | 546 | 702 |
| East Stirlingshire | Firs Park | 307 | 396 |
| Elgin City | Borough Briggs | 423 | 537 |
| Montrose | Links Park | 463 | 1,211 |
| Queen's Park | Hampden Park | 590 | 916 |
| Stenhousemuir | Ochilview Park | 461 | 683 |

== Table ==
| Pos | Team | Pld | W | D | L | GF | GA | GD | Pts | Promotion or qualification |
|---|---|---|---|---|---|---|---|---|---|---|
| 1 | Berwick Rangers (C, P) | 36 | 24 | 3 | 9 | 51 | 29 | +22 | 75 | Promotion to the Second Division |
| 2 | Arbroath | 36 | 22 | 4 | 10 | 61 | 33 | +28 | 70 | Qualification for the Second Division Play-offs (Note: The 2nd, 3rd and 4th placed teams will be entered into a play-off with the Second Division's 9th placed team. The winning team will be awarded a place in the 2007–08 Second Division, Stranraer were relegated and Queen's Park were promoted.) |
| 3 | Queen's Park (O, P) | 36 | 21 | 5 | 10 | 57 | 28 | +29 | 68 | Qualification for the Second Division Play-offs |
| 4 | East Fife | 36 | 20 | 7 | 9 | 59 | 37 | +22 | 67 | Qualification for the Second Division Play-offs |
| 5 | Dumbarton | 36 | 18 | 5 | 13 | 52 | 37 | +15 | 59 | |
| 6 | Albion Rovers | 36 | 14 | 6 | 16 | 56 | 61 | −5 | 48 | |
| 7 | Stenhousemuir | 36 | 13 | 5 | 18 | 53 | 63 | −10 | 44 | |
| 8 | Montrose | 36 | 11 | 4 | 21 | 42 | 62 | −20 | 37 | |
| 9 | Elgin City | 36 | 9 | 2 | 25 | 39 | 69 | −30 | 29 | |
| 10 | East Stirlingshire | 36 | 6 | 3 | 27 | 27 | 78 | −51 | 21 | |

Source: Soccerway
Rules for classification: 1) points; 2) goal difference; 3) number of goals scored.
(C) Champions; (O) Play-off winners; (P) Promoted

== Results ==
Teams play each other four times in this league. In the first half of the season each team plays every other team twice (home and away) and then do the same in the second half of the season.

=== First half of season ===
| Home \ Away | ALB | ARB | BER | DUM | EFI | EST | ELG | MON | QPA | STE |
|---|---|---|---|---|---|---|---|---|---|---|
| Albion Rovers | | 1–3 | 0–1 | 2–1 | 0–1 | 4–0 | 3–1 | 3–1 | 1–1 | 2–5 |
| Arbroath | 2–3 | | 0–1 | 0–0 | 1–1 | 1–2 | 2–1 | 3–1 | 1–2 | 2–0 |
| Berwick Rangers | 1–1 | 3–2 | | 3–0 | 2–1 | 2–2 | 3–1 | 1–2 | 1–0 | 0–1 |
| Dumbarton | 3–1 | 0–2 | 2–0 | | 2–1 | 2–0 | 3–1 | 2–0 | 0–0 | 4–0 |
| East Fife | 2–2 | 2–1 | 2–0 | 1–0 | | 5–0 | 1–1 | 2–0 | 1–0 | 0–0 |
| East Stirlingshire | 0–1 | 0–2 | 0–1 | 0–2 | 0–4 | | 2–1 | 0–3 | 2–1 | 5–0 |
| Elgin City | 0–3 | 0–4 | 1–2 | 0–2 | 1–2 | 5–0 | | 3–2 | 1–2 | 2–0 |
| Montrose | 2–1 | 0–1 | 0–1 | 1–1 | 1–0 | 1–0 | 2–0 | | 0–3 | 0–1 |
| Queen's Park | 2–1 | 0–3 | 1–0 | 1–0 | 3–0 | 1–3 | 3–0 | 1–1 | | 1–1 |
| Stenhousemuir | 3–2 | 1–2 | 2–3 | 1–0 | 0–1 | 2–0 | 2–0 | 5–0 | 2–1 | |

Source: Soccerway
Legend: Blue = home team win; Yellow = draw; Red = away team win.

=== Second half of season ===
| Home \ Away | ALB | ARB | BER | DUM | EFI | EST | ELG | MON | QPA | STE |
|---|---|---|---|---|---|---|---|---|---|---|
| Albion Rovers | | 0–3 | 0–1 | 0–1 | 0–3 | 2–1 | 6–2 | 2–2 | 2–1 | 2–1 |
| Arbroath | 0–0 | | 1–0 | 2–2 | 1–3 | 3–2 | 2–1 | 1–0 | 1–0 | 4–1 |
| Berwick Rangers | 3–0 | 1–0 | | 2–1 | 2–0 | 2–0 | 0–0 | 1–0 | 0–2 | 2–1 |
| Dumbarton | 3–1 | 1–0 | 1–2 | | 0–2 | 2–1 | 1–0 | 2–1 | 1–2 | 1–1 |
| East Fife | 1–3 | 1–2 | 0–2 | 1–0 | | 0–2 | 3–1 | 2–0 | 1–0 | 1–1 |
| East Stirlingshire | 0–0 | 1–5 | 0–3 | 1–5 | 0–2 | | 0–2 | 0–2 | 0–2 | 0–1 |
| Elgin City | 3–0 | 0–1 | 2–1 | 0–1 | 2–3 | 2–1 | | 0–2 | 0–3 | 2–1 |
| Montrose | 2–3 | 0–1 | 1–2 | 0–5 | 3–3 | 4–0 | 0–1 | | 0–2 | 3–2 |
| Queen's Park | 5–0 | 1–0 | 0–2 | 2–0 | 1–1 | 2–1 | 3–0 | 5–0 | | 1–0 |
| Stenhousemuir | 0–4 | 1–2 | 2–0 | 5–1 | 3–5 | 1–1 | 3–2 | 2–5 | 1–2 | |

Source: Soccerway
Legend: Blue = home team win; Yellow = draw; Red = away team win.

== Top scorers ==
| Rank | Scorer | Goals | Team |
|---|---|---|---|
| 1 | (Scotland) Scott Chaplain | 18 | Albion Rovers |
| 1 | (Scotland) Martin Johnston | 18 | Elgin City |
| 3 | (Scotland) David Weatherston | 16 | Queen's Park |
| 4 | (Scotland) Craig O'Reilly | 13 | East Fife |
| 5 | (Scotland) Mark Ferry | 11 | Queen's Park |
| 6 | (Scotland) Stephen Dobbie | 10 | Dumbarton |
| 6 | (Scotland) Neil Jablonski | 10 | East Fife |
| 6 | (Scotland) Andy Rogers | 10 | Montrose |
| 6 | (Scotland) Pat Walker | 10 | Albion Rovers |
| 6 | (Scotland) Gary Wood | 10 | Berwick Rangers |

== Notes ==
- A. Stenhousemuir 5–0 Montrose (12 August 2006); East Stirlingshire 5–0 Stenhousemuir (26 August 2006); East Fife 5–0 East Stirlingshire (1 September 2006); Elgin City 5–0 East Stirlingshire (14 October 2006); Queen's Park 5–0 Montrose (20 January 2007); Queen's Park 5–0 Albion Rovers (3 March 2007).
