= Chris Boyle (footballer) =

Scottish footballer

Personal information
- Full name: Christopher Thomas Boyle
- Date of birth: 10 June 1982 (age 44)
- Place of birth: Irvine, Scotland

Youth career
- Kilmarnock

Senior career*
Years	Team	Apps	(Gls)
1999–2003	Kilmarnock	0	(0)
2003–2007	Dumbarton	109	(11)
2009–2012	Albion Rovers	69	(9)
- * Club domestic league appearances and goals

Christopher Thomas Boyle (born 10 June 1982) is a Scottish footballer who played for Kilmarnock, Dumbarton and Albion Rovers.
