= 2005–06 Scottish Second Division =

Scottish Second Division
- Season: 2005–06
- Champions: Gretna
- Promoted: Gretna; Partick Thistle
- Relegated: Dumbarton
- UEFA Cup: Gretna
- Top goalscorer: Kenny Deuchar (18)

The 2005–06 Scottish Second Division was won by Gretna who were promoted to the First Division in what was their second successive promotion. Partick Thistle were also promoted via the playoffs. Dumbarton were relegated while Alloa Athletic retained their Second Division status by beating Arbroath and Berwick Rangers in the playoff matches.

== Table ==
Pos	Team	Pld	W	D	L	GF	GA	GD	Pts	Promotion, qualification or relegation
1	Gretna (C, P)	36	28	4	4	97	30	+67	88	Promotion to the 2006–07 First Division and qualification for UEFA Cup second qualifying round (Note: As Heart of Midlothian, the Scottish Cup winners, qualified for the Champions League via their league position, the place in the UEFA Cup was passed to Gretna, the cup runner-up.)
2	Greenock Morton	36	21	7	8	58	33	+25	70	Qualification for the First Division Play-offs (Note: The 2nd, 3rd and 4th placed teams will be entered into a play-off with the First Division's 9th placed team. The winning team were awarded a place in the 2006–07 First Division, Stranraer were relegated and Partick Thistle were promoted.)
3	Peterhead	36	17	6	13	53	47	+6	57	Qualification for the First Division Play-offs
4	Partick Thistle (P)	36	16	9	11	57	56	+1	57	Qualification for the First Division Play-offs
5	Stirling Albion	36	15	6	15	54	63	−9	51	
6	Ayr United	36	10	12	14	56	61	−5	42	
7	Raith Rovers	36	11	9	16	44	54	−10	42	
8	Forfar Athletic	36	12	4	20	44	55	−11	40	
9	Alloa Athletic	36	8	8	20	36	77	−41	32	Qualification for the Second Division Play-offs (Note: The 9th placed team were entered into a play-off with the Third Division's 2nd, 3rd and 4th placed teams. The winning team were awarded a place in the 2006–07 Second Division, Alloa Athletic won the play-off to stay in the division.)
10	Dumbarton (R)	36	7	5	24	40	63	−23	26	Relegation to the 2006–07 Third Division

Source: "2005-2006 Second Division - SPFL Archive". SPFL.
Rules for classification: 1) points; 2) goal difference; 3) number of goals scored.
(C) Champions; (P) Promoted; (R) Relegated

== Top scorers ==
Player	Club	Goals
(Scotland) Kenny Deuchar	Gretna	18
(Scotland) James Grady	Gretna	16
(Scotland) Paul McManus	Raith Rovers	15
(France) Jerome Vareille	Ayr United	13
(Scotland) Ryan McGuffie	Gretna	13
(Scotland) Derek Lilley	Morton	12
(Scotland) Paddy Connolly	Stirling Albion	12
(Scotland) Andrew Rodgers	Dumbarton	12
(Scotland) Chris Aitken	Stirling Albion	12
(Scotland) Steve Tosh	Gretna	12
(Scotland) Bobby Linn	Peterhead	12

== Attendances ==
The average attendances for Division Two clubs for season 2005/06 are shown below:

Club	Average
Morton	2,759
Partick Thistle	1,682
Raith Rovers	1,624
Gretna	1,341
Ayr United	1,271
Dumbarton	946
Stirling Albion	902
Alloa Athletic	742
Peterhead	691
Forfar Athletic	544

== Second Division play-offs ==
The Playoff semi-finals took on 3 May 2006 and 6 May 2006. The final took place on 10 May 2006 and 14 May 2006.

Semi-finals

- Arbroath 1–1 Alloa Athletic
- Alloa Athletic 1–0 Arbroath
- Stenhousemuir 0–1 Berwick Rangers
- Berwick Rangers 0–0 Stenhousemuir

Final

- Alloa Athletic 4–0 Berwick Rangers
- Berwick Rangers 2–1 Alloa Athletic
