= 2006–07 Scottish Second Division =

Scottish Second Division
- Season: 2006–07
- Champions: Greenock Morton
- Promoted: Greenock Morton; Stirling Albion
- Relegated: Forfar Athletic; Stranraer
- Top goalscorer: Iain Russell (21)

The 2006–07 Second Division season is the thirteenth season of the Scottish Second Division in its current format of ten teams.

Greenock Morton were promoted to the First Division as League champions. Stirling Albion, Raith Rovers and Brechin City enter the promotion/relegation playoffs for a place in the First Division along with Airdrie United who finished second bottom of the First Division.

Forfar Athletic were relegated to the Third Division while Stranraer enter the promotion/relegation playoffs with the second, third and fourth placed teams of the Third Division - Arbroath, Queen's Park and East Fife respectively.

== Promotion and Relegation from 2005–06 ==
=== First & Second Divisions ===
Relegated from First Division to Second Division

- Brechin City
- Stranraer (via play-offs)

Promoted from Second Division to First Division

- Gretna
- Partick Thistle (via play-offs)

=== Second & Third Divisions ===
Relegated from Second Division to Third Division

- Dumbarton

Promoted from Third Division to Second Division

- Cowdenbeath

== Table ==
Pos	Team	Pld	W	D	L	GF	GA	GD	Pts	Promotion, qualification or relegation
1	Greenock Morton (C, P)	36	24	5	7	76	32	+44	77	Promotion to the First Division
2	Stirling Albion (P)	36	21	6	9	67	39	+28	69	Qualification for the First Division Play-offs (Note: The 2nd, 3rd and 4th placed teams will be entered into a play-off with the First Division's 9th placed team. The winning team were awarded a place in the 2007–08 First Division, Airdrie United were relegated and Stirling Albion were promoted.)
3	Raith Rovers	36	18	8	10	50	33	+17	62	Qualification for the First Division Play-offs
4	Brechin City	36	18	6	12	61	45	+16	60	Qualification for the First Division Play-offs
5	Ayr United	36	14	8	14	46	47	−1	50	
6	Cowdenbeath	36	13	6	17	59	56	+3	45	
7	Alloa Athletic	36	11	9	16	47	70	−23	42	
8	Peterhead	36	11	8	17	60	62	−2	41	
9	Stranraer (R)	36	10	9	17	45	74	−29	39	Qualification for the Second Division Play-offs (Note: The 9th placed team were entered into a play-off with the Third Division's 2nd, 3rd and 4th placed teams. The winning team were awarded a place in the 2007–08 Second Division, Stranraer were relegated and Queen's Park were promoted.)
10	Forfar Athletic (R)	36	4	7	25	37	90	−53	19	Relegation to the Third Division

Source: "2006–2007 Second Division - SPFL Archive". SPFL (in Malay).
Rules for classification: 1) points; 2) goal difference; 3) number of goals scored.
(C) Champions; (P) Promoted; (R) Relegated

== Top scorers ==
Scorer	Goals	Team
(Scotland) Iain Russell	21	Brechin City
(Scotland) Liam Buchanan	20	Cowdenbeath
(England) Peter Weatherson	15	Greenock Morton
(Scotland) Colin Cramb	14	Stirling Albion
(Scotland) Pat Clarke	13	Cowdenbeath
(Scotland) Michael Moore	13	Stranraer
(Scotland) Bobby Linn	12	Greenock Morton
(Scotland) Chris Templeman	12	Greenock Morton
(Scotland) Martin Bavidge	11	Peterhead
(Scotland) Darren Gribben	11	Forfar Athletic
(Scotland) Paul McGowan	11	Greenock Morton

== Attendances ==
The average attendances for Second Division clubs for season 2006/07 are shown below:

Club	Average	Highest
Greenock Morton	2,651	5,255
Raith Rovers	1,935	4,327
Ayr United	1,202	2,105
Stirling Albion	947	2,608
Cowdenbeath	683	2,249
Peterhead	636	819
Alloa Athletic	634	1,138
Brechin City	569	909
Forfar Athletic	500	765
Stranraer	418	1,003

== Second Division play-offs ==
=== Semi-finals ===
The ninth placed team in the Second Division played the fourth placed team in the Third Division and third placed team in the Second Division played the second placed team in the Second Division. The play-offs were played over two legs, the winning team in each semi-final advanced to the final.

Team 1	Agg.	Team 2	1st leg	2nd leg
East Fife	4 – 2	Stranraer	4–1	0–1
Queen's Park	4 – 1	Arbroath	2–0	2–1

First legs

May 2, 2007

East Fife	4 – 1	Stranraer
Graham Gibson 10'; Craig O'Reilly 43' 45' 54'	Report	Michael Moore 55'

Bayview Stadium, Methil
Attendance: 742
Referee: Stephen Finnie

May 1, 2007

Queen's Park	2 – 0	Arbroath
David Weatherston 77'; Alan Trouten 90' (pen.)	Report

Hampden Park, Glasgow
Attendance: 974
Referee: Mike Tumilty

Second legs

May 5, 2007

Stranraer	1 – 0	East Fife
Paul McGrillen 64'	Report

Stair Park, Stranraer
Attendance: 426
Referee: Crawford Allan

May 5, 2007

Arbroath	1 – 2	Queens Park
Paul Tosh 50'	Report	David Weatherston 32'; Alan Trouten 43'

Gayfield Park, Arbroath
Attendance: 1,114
Referee: Eddie Smith

=== Final ===
The two semi-final winners played each other over two legs. The winning team was awarded a place in the 2008–09 Second Division.

Team 1	Agg.	Team 2	1st leg	2nd leg
Queen's Park	7 – 2	East Fife	4–2	3–0

First leg

9 May 2007

Queen's Park	4 – 2	East Fife
Steven Canning 30' 54'; Mick Dunlop 44'; Paul Cairney 70'	Report	Lloyd Young 60'; Greig McDonald 77'

Firhill Stadium, Glasgow
Attendance: 1,207
Referee: John Underhill

Second leg

12 May 2007

East Fife	0 – 3	Queens Park
	Report	Paul Paton 4'; Alan Trouten 74'; Frankie Carroll 89'

Bayview Stadium, Methil
Attendance: 1,625
Referee: William Collum

Queen's Park were promoted to the Second Division
