= 2017–18 Brechin City F.C. season =

Brechin City
2017–18 season
- Manager: Darren Dods
- Stadium: Glebe Park; Brechin, Scotland (Capacity: 4,083)
- Championship: Tenth (relegated)
- Challenge Cup: First round, lost to Buckie Thistle
- League Cup: Group stage, Fourth
- Scottish Cup: Fourth round, lost to Celtic
- Top goalscorer: League: Jordan Sinclair (5); All: Jordan Sinclair (6)
- Highest home attendance: League: 2,627 vs. Dundee United (25 November 2017); Cup: 712 vs. Falkirk (29 July 2017)
- Lowest home attendance: League: 445 vs. Dumbarton (17 March 2018); Cup: 526 vs. Forfar Athletic (18 July 2017)
- Average home league attendance: 923
- Biggest win: League: None; Cup: Buckie Thistle 2–3 Brechin City (18 November 2017)
- Biggest defeat: League: Brechin City 0–5 Dundee United (17 April 2018); Cup: Celtic 5–0 Brechin City (20 January 2018)
Home colours	Away colours
- All statistics correct as of 9 May 2018.

The 2017–18 season was Brechin City's first season in the Scottish Championship, having finished 4th in the 2016–17 Scottish League One, winning promotion by defeating Raith Rovers and Alloa Athletic in the Championship play-offs. Brechin became the first club in 126 years to fail to win a league match, picking up just four points from 4 draws. Their sole win during the 2017–18 season came against Highland League side Buckie Thistle in the third round of the Scottish Cup.

Brechin City also competed in the Scottish Challenge Cup, Scottish League Cup and Scottish Cup.

== Results & fixtures ==
Win Draw Loss Postponed

=== Scottish Championship ===
5 August 2017 Match 1	Queen of the South	4 – 1	Brechin City	Dumfries, Scotland
15:00	Lyle 28', 42'; Rankin 59'; Dykes 78'	SPFL report	C. O'Neil 75'	Stadium: Palmerston Park; Attendance: 1,209; Referee: Steven

12 August 2017 Match 2	Brechin City	2 – 2	Livingston	Brechin, Scotland
15:00	Orsi 54'; Graham 61'	SPFL report	Mackin 25'; Pittman 44'	Stadium: Glebe Park; Attendance: 579; Referee: Duncan

19 August 2017 Match 3	Dundee United	1 – 0	Brechin City	Dundee, Scotland
15:00	McDonald 80'	SPFL report		Stadium: Tannadice Park; Attendance: 6,060; Referee: Anderson

26 August 2017 Match 4	Brechin City	0 – 4	Inverness Caledonian Thistle	Brechin, Scotland
15:00		SPFL report	Vigurs 27', 73'; McKay 32'; Cooper 62'	Stadium: Glebe Park; Attendance: 703; Referee: Northcroft

9 September 2017 Match 5	Brechin City	1 – 1	Falkirk	Brechin, Scotland
15:00	Graham 72'	SPFL report	Harris 15'	Stadium: Glebe Park; Attendance: 748; Referee: Cook

16 September 2017 Match 6	Dumbarton	2 – 1	Brechin City	Dumbarton, Scotland
15:00		SPFL report	Sinclair 2'	Stadium: Dumbarton Football Stadium; Attendance: 589; Referee: Walsh

23 September 2017 Match 7	Brechin City	0 – 3	Dunfermline Athletic	Brechin, Scotland
15:00		SPFL report	Ashcroft 28'; McManus 55'; Clark 70'	Stadium: Glebe Park; Attendance: 1,214; Referee: McKendrick

30 September 2017 Match 8	St Mirren	2 – 1	Brechin City	Paisley, Scotland
15:00	C. Smith 14'; Hilson 78'	SPFL report	Orsi 38'	Stadium: St Mirren Park; Attendance: 3,928; Referee: Duncan

14 October 2017 Match 9	Brechin City	0 – 1	Greenock Morton	Brechin, Scotland
15:00		SPFL report	Murdoch 81'	Stadium: Glebe Park; Attendance: 624; Referee: Steven

21 October 2017 Match 10	Brechin City	0 – 1	Queen of the South	Brechin, Scotland
15:00	Love (red card) 90+5'	SPFL report	Kerr 60' (red card) 90+5'	Stadium: Glebe Park; Attendance: 562; Referee: Charleston

28 October 2017 Match 11	Livingston	3 – 2	Brechin City	Livingston, Scotland
15:00	McMillan 3'; Halkett 60'; Mackin 69'	SPFL report	Sinclair 8'; Orsi 85' (pen.)	Stadium: Almondvale Stadium; Attendance: 926; Referee: Finnie

4 November 2017 Match 12	Brechin City	0 – 1	Dumbarton	Brechin, Scotland
15:00		SPFL report	Dyer 90' (o.g.)	Stadium: Glebe Park; Attendance: 538; Referee: Robertson

25 November 2017 Match 13	Brechin City	1 – 1	Dundee United	Brechin, Scotland
15:00	Crighton 46'	SPFL report	McDonald 29'	Stadium: Glebe Park; Attendance: 2,627; Referee: Cook

28 November 2017 Match 14	Inverness Caledonian Thistle	4 – 0	Brechin City	Inverness, Scotland
19:45	McKay 7'; Baird 9'; Bell 52'; Oakley 87'	SPFL report		Stadium: Caledonian Stadium; Attendance: 1,801; Referee: Charleston

2 December 2017 Match 15	Greenock Morton	4 – 1	Brechin City	Greenock, Scotland
15:00	Oliver 4'; Tiffoney 44'; Harkins 72' (pen.); Quitongo 83'	SPFL report	Layne 41'	Stadium: Cappielow; Attendance: 1,388; Referee: Newlands

9 December 2017 Match 16	Brechin City	1 – 2	St Mirren	Brechin, Scotland
15:00	Layne 27'	SPFL report	Reilly 20'; C. Smith 64' (pen.)	Stadium: Glebe Park; Attendance: 812; Referee: Steven

23 December 2017 Match 17	Dunfermline Athletic	2 – 1	Brechin City	Dunfermline, Scotland
15:00	McManus 22'; Paton 49'	SPFL report	McLennan 59'	Stadium: East End Park; Attendance: 4,595; Referee: Aitken

30 December 2017 Match 18	Brechin City	2 – 3	Inverness Caledonian Thistle	Brechin, Scotland
15:00	Sinclair 18' (pen.), 39'	SPFL report	E. Smith 4' (o.g.); Oakley 65', 78'; Tremarco (yellow card) 67' (red card)	Stadium: Glebe Park; Attendance: 571; Referee: Duncan

2 January 2018 Match 19	Dundee United	4 – 1	Brechin City	Dundee, Scotland
15:00	McDonald 1', 49'; Stanton 7'; Keatings 52' (pen.); McMullan (yellow card) 57' (red card)	SPFL report	Sinclair 64' (pen.)	Stadium: Tannadice Park; Attendance: 5,532; Referee: Newlands

6 January 2018 Match 20	Brechin City	1 – 1	Greenock Morton	Brechin, Scotland
15:00	McLennan 7'	SPFL report	McHugh 12'	Stadium: Glebe Park; Attendance: 694; Referee: McKendrick

13 January 2018 Match 21	Brechin City	0 – 2	Livingston	Brechin, Scotland
15:00		SPFL report	Halkett 12' (pen.); Robinson 69'	Stadium: Glebe Park; Attendance: 551; Referee: Charleston

27 January 2018 Match 22	Queen of the South	3 – 1	Brechin City	Dumfries, Scotland
15:00	Dobbie 7', 13', 73'	SPFL report	Orsi 85'	Stadium: Palmerston Park; Attendance: 1,211; Referee: Dallas

6 February 2018 Match 23	Falkirk	3 – 1	Brechin City	Falkirk, Scotland
19:45	Jakubiak 13'; Loy 28'; Longridge 71'	SPFL report	Mackin 67'	Stadium: Falkirk Stadium; Attendance: 4,214; Referee: Northcroft

17 February 2018 Match 24	Brechin City	0 – 1	Falkirk	Brechin, Scotland
15:00	Lynas (red card) 68'	SPFL report	Jakubiak 90+3'	Stadium: Glebe Park; Attendance: 805; Referee: Aitken

24 February 2018 Match 25	St Mirren	1 – 0	Brechin City	Paisley, Scotland
15:00	O'Neil 15' (o.g.)	SPFL report		Stadium: St Mirren Park; Attendance: 4,358; Referee: McLean

27 February 2018 Match 26	Brechin City	P – P	Dunfermline Athletic	Brechin, Scotland
19:45				Stadium: Glebe Park
Note: _{Match postponed due to snow}

3 March 2018 Match 27	Inverness Caledonian Thistle	P – P	Brechin City	Inverness, Scotland
19:45				Stadium: Caledonian Stadium
Note: _{Match postponed due to snow}

10 March 2018 Match 28	Brechin City	P – P	Dundee United	Brechin, Scotland
15:00				Stadium: Glebe Park
Note: _{Match postponed due to waterlogged pitch}

13 March 2018 Match 29	Dumbarton	1 – 0	Brechin City	Dumbarton, Scotland
15:00	Froxylias 37'	SPFL report		Stadium: Dumbarton Football Stadium; Attendance: 403; Referee: Newlands

17 March 2018 Match 30	Brechin City	1 – 3	Dumbarton	Brechin, Scotland
15:00	Storie 38'	SPFL report	C. Gallagher 11'; Crighton 24' (o.g.); Handling 43'	Stadium: Glebe Park

20 March 2018 Match 26 ^{(Rearranged)}	Brechin City	0 – 3	Dunfermline Athletic	Brechin, Scotland
19:45		SPFL report	Clark 8', 9', 54'	Stadium: Glebe Park; Attendance: 661; Referee: Cook

24 March 2018 Match 31	Greenock Morton	2 – 0	Brechin City	Greenock, Scotland
15:00	Baird 50', 72'	SPFL report		Stadium: Cappielow; Attendance: 1,831; Referee: Roncone

31 March 2018 Match 32	Falkirk	3 – 0	Brechin City	Falkirk, Scotland
15:00	Muirhead 17'; Sibbald 29'; Nelson 60'	SPFL report	Crighton (red card) 41'; McLean (red card) 44'	Stadium: Falkirk Stadium; Attendance: 4,422; Referee: Finnie

3 April 2018 Match 27 ^{(Rearranged)}	Inverness Caledonian Thistle	4 – 0	Brechin City	Inverness, Scotland
19:45	Chalmers 12', 58'; Donaldson 22'; Oakley 66'	SPFL report		Stadium: Caledonian Stadium; Attendance: 1,963; Referee: Steven

7 April 2018 Match 33	Brechin City	0 – 1	St Mirren	Brechin, Scotland
15:00		SPFL report	Magennis 7'	Stadium: Glebe Park; Attendance: 2,447; Referee: Munro

14 April 2018 Match 34	Dunfermline Athletic	4 – 0	Brechin City	Dunfermline, Scotland
15:00	Ashcroft 2'; Aird 25'; Ryan 72'; Higginbotham 87' (pen.)	SPFL report		Stadium: East End Park; Attendance: 4,898; Referee: McKendrick

14 April 2018 Match 28 ^{(Rearranged)}	Brechin City	0 – 5	Dundee United	Brechin, Scotland
15:00		SPFL report	McDonald 51', 79'; King 56'; Fraser 81'; Mohsni 88'	Stadium: Glebe Park; Attendance: 1,427; Referee: Charleston

21 April 2018 Match 35	Livingston	3 – 0	Brechin City	Livingston, Scotland
15:00	Pittman 67'; Longridge 73'; Hardie 86'	SPFL report		Stadium: Almondvale Stadium; Attendance: 943; Referee: Reid

28 April 2018 Match 36	Brechin City	1 – 5	Queen of the South	Brechin, Scotland
15:00		SPFL report		Stadium: Glebe Park; Attendance: 661; Referee: Steven Kirkland

=== Scottish League Cup ===
==== Table ====
Pos	Team	Pld	W	PW	PL	L	GF	GA	GD	Pts	Qualification	FAL	INV	STI	BRE	FOR
1	Falkirk (Q)	4	4	0	0	0	13	1	+12	12	Qualification for the Second Round	—	—	4–1	—	4–0
2	Inverness Caledonian Thistle	4	2	1	0	1	5	3	+2	8		0–2	—	—	3–0	—
3	Stirling Albion	4	2	0	1	1	6	5	+1	7		—	0–0p	—	2–0	—
4	Brechin City	4	0	1	0	3	1	9	−8	2		0–3	—	—	—	p1–1
5	Forfar Athletic	4	0	0	1	3	3	10	−7	1		—	1–2	1–3	—	—

Rules for classification: 1) goal difference, 2) goals scored, 3) away goals scored, 4) matches won, 5) away matches won, 6) drawing of lots.
(Q) Qualified to the phase indicated

==== Matches ====
15 July 2017 Match 1	Inverness Caledonian Thistle	3 – 0	Brechin City	Inverness, Scotland
15:00	Warren 21', 34'; Oakley 57'	SPFL report		Stadium: Caledonian Stadium; Attendance: 1,419; Referee: Cook

18 July 2017 Match 2	Brechin City	1 – 1 (4 – 3 p)	Forfar Athletic	Brechin, Scotland
19:45	Layne 68'	SPFL report	Millar 90+1' (pen.)	Stadium: Glebe Park; Attendance: 526; Referee: Napier
	Penalties
	Dyer (penalty scored); Dale (penalty missed); Crighton (penalty scored); Jackson (penalty scored); Love (penalty missed); Orsi (penalty scored)		(penalty scored) Millar; (penalty missed) Easton; (penalty scored) Munro; (penalty missed) Cox; (penalty scored) McBride; (penalty missed) See

25 July 2017 Match 3	Stirling Albion	2 – 0	Brechin City	Stirling, Scotland
15:00	MacDonald 40' (pen.); Caddis 90+1' (pen.)	SPFL report		Stadium: Forthbank Stadium; Attendance: 430; Referee: Newlands

29 July 2017 Match 4	Brechin City	0 – 3	Falkirk	Stirling, Scotland
15:00		SPFL report	Miller 20'; McKee 52'; Harris 72'	Stadium: Forthbank Stadium; Attendance: 712; Referee: Anderson

=== Scottish Challenge Cup ===
15 August 2017 Challenge Cup round 1	Buckie Thistle	2 – 1	Brechin City	Buckie, Scotland
20:00	Fraser 56', 82'	SPFL report	McLean 14'	Stadium: Victoria Park; Attendance: 453; Referee: Beaton

=== Scottish Cup ===
18 November 2017 Scottish Cup round 3	Buckie Thistle	2 – 3	Brechin City	Buckie, Scotland
15:00	McLeod 3', 43'	BBC Sport report	Sinclair 22'; Layne 59', 86'	Stadium: Victoria Park; Attendance: 295; Referee: Irvine

20 January 2018 Scottish Cup round 4	Celtic	5 – 0	Brechin City	Glasgow, Scotland
15:00	Forrest 2'; Sinclair 11'; Ntcham 49'; Boyata 56'; Édouard 86'	BBC Sport report		Stadium: Celtic Park; Attendance: 24,879; Referee: McLean

== Squad statistics ==
=== Appearances and goals ===
As of 9 May 2018

No.	Pos	Nat	Player	Total		Scottish Championship		Scottish Cup		League Cup		Challenge Cup	
No.	Pos	Nat	Player	Apps	Goals	Apps	Goals	Apps	Goals	Apps	Goals	Apps	Goals
1	GK	(Scotland) SCO	Graeme Smith	36	0	29	0	2	0	4	0	1	0
2	DF	(Scotland) SCO	Paul McLean	31	1	25	0	2	0	3	0	1	1
3	DF	(Scotland) SCO	Willie Dyer	31	0	25	0	1	0	4	0	1	0
4	MF	(Scotland) SCO	Gary Fusco	20	0	15	0	2	0	2	0	1	0
5	DF	(Scotland) SCO	Ryan McGeever	8	0	5	0	0	0	2	0	1	0
6	MF	(England) ENG	James Dale	34	0	28	0	2	0	3	0	1	0
7	MF	(England) ENG	Callum Tapping	13	0	13	0	0	0	0	0	0	0
8	MF	(Scotland) SCO	Finn Graham	36	2	30	2	2	0	3	0	1	0
9	FW	(Republic of Ireland) IRL	Andy Jackson	16	0	10	0	1	0	4	0	1	0
10	FW	(England) ENG	Isaac Layne	37	6	30	3	2	2	4	1	1	0
11	MF	(Scotland) SCO	Liam Watt	28	0	25	0	0	0	2	0	1	0
14	MF	(Scotland) SCO	Aron Lynas	31	0	26	0	1	0	4	0	0	0
15	DF	(Scotland) SCO	Euan Spark	28	0	23	0	1	0	3	0	1	0
16	FW	(Scotland) SCO	Callumn Morrison	8	1	8	1	0	0	0	0	0	0
17	DF	(Bulgaria) BUL	Kostadin Gadzhalov	0	0	0	0	0	0	0	0	0	0
18	MF	(Scotland) SCO	Kalvin Orsi	35	3	28	3	4	0	2	0	1	0
19	GK	(Scotland) SCO	Patrick O'Neil	3	0	3	0	0	0	0	0	0	0
20	DF	(Scotland) SCO	Sean Crighton	35	1	29	1	2	0	4	0	0	0
21	MF	(Scotland) SCO	Jordan Sinclair	31	5	27	5	2	0	2	0	0	0
22	FW	(Scotland) SCO	Dylan Mackin	6	1	6	1	0	0	0	0	0	0
24	DF	(Scotland) SCO	Darren Dods	0	0	0	0	0	0	0	0	0	0
25	MF	(Scotland) SCO	Craig Storie	0	0	0	0	0	0	0	0	0	0
26	GK	(Scotland) SCO	Scott Costello	0	0	0	0	0	0	0	0	0	0
28	DF	(Scotland) SCO	Kaden Mitchell	2	0	1	0	0	0	0	0	1	0
29	MF	(Scotland) SCO	Euan Smith	22	0	19	0	2	0	1	0	0	0
Players away from the club on loan:
12	DF	(Scotland) SCO	Chris O'Neil (on loan at Airdrieonians)	7	1	4	1	1	0	1	0	1	0
Players who appeared for Brechin City but left during the season:

== Club statistics ==
=== League table ===
Pos	Team	Pld	W	D	L	GF	GA	GD	Pts	Promotion, qualification or relegation
6	Queen of the South	36	14	10	12	59	53	+6	52	
7	Greenock Morton	36	13	11	12	47	40	+7	50	
8	Falkirk	36	12	11	13	45	49	−4	47	
9	Dumbarton (R)	36	7	9	20	27	63	−36	30	Qualification for the Championship play-offs
10	Brechin City (R)	36	0	4	32	20	90	−70	4	Relegation to League One

Source: Soccerway
Rules for classification: 1) Points; 2) Goal difference; 3) Goals scored; 4) Points in head-to-head matches; 5) Goal difference in hth matches; 6). Goals scored in hth matches; 7). Play-off (only for deciding promotion, play-off participation and relegation).
(R) Relegated

==== Results summary ====
Overall								Home						Away					
Pld	W	D	L	GF	GA	GD	Pts	W	D	L	GF	GA	GD	W	D	L	GF	GA	GD
36	0	4	32	20	90	−70	4	0	4	14	10	40	−30	0	0	18	10	50	−40

Last updated: 9 May 2018.
Source: Scottish Championship

== Transfers ==
=== Players in ===
Date	Position	No.	Nationality	Name	From	Fee	Ref.
12 June 2017	DF	5	(Scotland)	Ryan McGeever	Queen's Park	Free	
15 June 2017	FW	10	(England)	Isaac Layne	(England) Grays Athletic	Free	
18 June 2017	DF	15	(Scotland)	Euan Spark	Dunfermline Athletic	Free	
14 July 2017	DF	20	(Scotland)	Sean Crighton	Livingston	Free	
14 July 2017	MF	21	(Scotland)	Jordan Sinclair	Livingston	Free	
14 July 2017	MF	18	(England)	Kalvin Orsi	St Mirren	Free	
4 January 2018	MF	7	(Scotland)	Callum Tapping	Queen of the South	Free	
22 February 2018	MF	25	(Scotland)	Craig Storie	Aberdeen	Free	

=== Players out ===
Date	Position	No.	Nationality	Name	To	Fee	Ref.
31 May 2017	DF	—	(Scotland)	Darren McCormack	Free agent	Released	
31 May 2017	FW	—	(Scotland)	Ross Caldwell	Blantyre Victoria	Free	
6 June 2017	FW	—	(Scotland)	Alan Trouten	Albion Rovers	Free	
2 July 2017	DF	—	(Scotland)	Gareth Rodger	Edinburgh City	Free	
15 July 2017	DF	—	(Scotland)	Dougie Hill	Dumbarton	Free	
1 January 2018	DF	7	(Scotland)	Ally Love	Clyde	Free	

=== Loans in ===
Date	Position	No.	Nationality	Name	From	Duration	Ref.
30 August 2017	FW	17	(Scotland)	Connor McLennan	Aberdeen	5 months	
26 January 2018	FW	16	(Scotland)	Callumn Morrison	Heart of Midlothian	End of the season	
26 January 2018	FW	22	(Scotland)	Dylan Mackin	Livingston	End of the season	
23 February 2018	DF	17	(Bulgaria)	Kostadin Gadzhalov	Dundee	1 month	

=== Loans out ===
Date	Position	No.	Nationality	Name	To	Duration	Ref.
14 November 2017	GK	26	(Scotland)	Scott Costello	Thornton Hibs	2 months	
26 January 2018	DF	12	(Scotland)	Chris O'Neil	Airdrieonians	End of season	
