= Colin Hamilton (footballer) =

Scottish footballer (born 1992)

Personal information
- Date of birth: 7 May 1992 (age 34)
- Place of birth: Stirling, Scotland
- Position: Defender

Team information
- Current team: Arbroath (Player/Co-Manager)
- Number: 3

Youth career
- Stenhousemuir
- 2009–2012: Heart of Midlothian

Senior career*
Years	Team	Apps	(Gls)
2011–2012	Heart of Midlothian	0	(0)
2011	→ Stenhousemuir (loan)	8	(1)
2012–2014	Arbroath	67	(3)
2014–2015	Brechin City	32	(3)
2015–2016	Alloa Athletic	34	(2)
2016–	Arbroath	233	(17)

Managerial career
- 2024–: Arbroath (co-manager)
- * Club domestic league appearances and goals as of 03:27, 13 February 2024 (UTC)

Colin Hamilton (born 7 May 1992) is a Scottish professional footballer who plays as a defender for and co-manages Scottish Championship club Arbroath with David Gold.

He began his career at Stenhousemuir and moved to Heart of Midlothian in 2009. He never played for Hearts, and made his debut on loan back at Stenhousemuir in the Scottish Football League Second Division, where he later represented Arbroath and Brechin City. He spent the 2015–16 season at Alloa Athletic before returning to Arbroath.

== Career ==
=== Heart of Midlothian ===
A former youth player at Stenhousemuir, Hamilton was signed by Heart of Midlothian in March 2009. He was first included in a matchday squad on 15 May 2011, remaining an unused substitute as they concluded the Scottish Premier League season with a 2–1 defeat at Dundee United.

In September 2011, Hamilton returned to Stenhousemuir on loan. He made his debut on 24 September, playing the full 90 minutes as they defeated East Fife 2–1 at Ochilview Park in the Second Division. A week later he scored his first goal, a header in a 5–2 loss at Airdrie United. On 19 October, his loan was extended until 24 December, the maximum 91 days.

=== Arbroath ===
In 2012, Hamilton joined another Second Division team, Arbroath, and made his debut on 18 August in a 4–2 win over Ayr United at Gayfield Park. His first goal for the club came on 9 February 2013, the only goal of an away victory at Albion Rovers. He made 32 league appearances in his first season at Arbroath, scoring once more, an equaliser in a 4–2 win at Forfar Athletic on 30 March.

In July 2013, he trialled at English club Notts County, but the transfer collapsed. On 24 August, Hamilton was sent off after half an hour for conceding a penalty in an eventual 2–1 defeat at East Fife. He made 35 league appearances in his second campaign at Arbroath, scoring in a 4–3 home defeat to former club Stenhousemuir on 21 September.

=== Brechin City ===
On 22 May 2014, Hamilton joined fellow Scottish League One club Brechin City. He made his debut on 26 July in the first round of the Scottish Challenge Cup, playing the full 90 minutes in a 3–1 win at Cowdenbeath. On 23 August, he scored his first goal for the club, heading the opening goal of a 2–2 draw away to Stranraer. He was sent off on 11 November for two bookings in a 2–1 win over Stirling Albion at Glebe Park.

On 29 November, Hamilton headed the opening goal away to Annan Athletic in the Scottish Cup fourth round, but it ended in a 1–1 draw; ten days later he scored again in the replay, a 4–2 victory. He was sent off for a second time on 14 March 2015 in a 3–0 loss at Peterhead. Hamilton played 32 League One games in his only season at Brechin, and also took part with them in the play-offs for promotion to the Scottish Championship, where they lost 2–1 on aggregate to Alloa Athletic in the semi-finals.

=== Alloa Athletic ===
On 21 May 2015, Hamilton became Alloa's first signing after securing their Championship status. He made his debut on 25 July, playing the full 90 minutes as they won 1–0 at Highland League team Brora Rangers in the first round of the Challenge Cup. On 8 August he played his first game in a professional league, a 3–1 loss away to Queen of the South.

He scored his first Alloa goal on 19 September, a last-minute equaliser against Rangers at the Indodrill Stadium, and added a second on 9 February 2016 to start a comeback to earn a 2–2 home draw against Greenock Morton. However, Alloa were relegated at the end of the season.

=== Return to Arbroath ===
Prior to the 2016–17 season, Hamilton returned to Arbroath, now in League Two. In his first match back for the Red Lichties, he scored a last-minute equaliser to earn a 1–1 draw at home to Championship club Dundee United in the group stages of the League Cup. His team won promotion at the end of the season as champions.

On 21 April 2018, Hamilton scored in a 2–0 home win over Airdrieonians to seal a spot in the play-offs for a potential second consecutive promotion. However, they lost in the semi-finals to Dumbarton.

== Personal life ==
Hamilton's younger brother Jack also became a footballer. A goalkeeper, he went from Stenhousemuir's academy to Hearts at the same time.

=== Managerial statistics ===
As of 7 November 2026

Team	From	To	Record					
Team	From	To	G	W	D	L	Win %	
Arbroath (co-manager)	12 September 2024	Present	96	42	22	32	43.75	
Career Total			96	42	22	32	43.75	—

== Career statistics ==
As of match played 18 January 2020

Appearances and goals by club, season and competition
Club	Season	League			Scottish Cup		League Cup		Other		Total	
Club	Season	Division	Apps	Goals	Apps	Goals	Apps	Goals	Apps	Goals	Apps	Goals
Heart of Midlothian	2011–12	Scottish Premier League	0	0	0	0	0	0	0	0	0	0
Stenhousemuir (loan)	2011–12	Scottish Second Division	8	1	0	0	0	0	0	0	8	1
Arbroath	2012–13	Scottish Second Division	32	2	3	0	1	0	2 (Note: Appearances in the Scottish Challenge Cup)	0	38	2
Arbroath	2013–14	Scottish League One	35	1	1	0	1	0	0	0	37	1
Arbroath	Total		67	3	4	0	2	0	2	0	75	3
Brechin City	2014–15	Scottish League One	32	3	4	2	1	0	4 (Note: Two appearances in the Scottish Challenge Cup and two in the Championship play-offs)	0	41	5
Alloa Athletic	2015–16	Scottish Championship	34	2	1	0	1	0	1	0	37	2
Arbroath	2016–17	Scottish League Two	36	1	2	1	4	1	2	1	44	4
Arbroath	2017–18	Scottish League One	34	4	2	1	2	0	3 (Note: One appearance in the Scottish Challenge Cup and two in the Championship play-offs)	0	41	5
Arbroath	2018–19	Scottish League One	34	3	1	0	4	1	3	0	42	4
Arbroath	2019–20	Scottish Championship	20	1	3	0	4	1	1	0	28	2
Arbroath	Total		124	9	8	2	14	3	9	1	155	15
Career total			265	18	17	4	18	3	16	1	316	26

== Honours ==
=== Player ===
Arbroath

- Scottish League Two: 2016–17
- Scottish League One: 2018–19

=== Manager ===
Arbroath

- Scottish League One: 2024–25
