= Kieran Millar =

Scottish footballer

Personal information
- Date of birth: 14 October 1993 (age 33)
- Place of birth: Scotland
- Position: Midfielder

Team information
- Current team: East Fife
- Number: 4

Youth career
- Hamilton Academical

Senior career*
| Years | Team | Apps | (Gls) |
| 2010–2013 | Hamilton Academical | 3 | (0) |
| 2012 | → Stenhousemuir (loan) | 5 | (0) |
| 2014–2017 | Stenhousemuir | 83 | (2) |
| 2017–2018 | East Fife | 33 | (0) |
| 2018–2020 | Airdrieonians | 56 | (0) |
| 2020–2021 | Stranraer | 21 | (0) |
| 2021– | East Fife | 151 | (8) |
- * Club domestic league appearances and goals as of 4 May 2026

Kieran Millar (born 14 October 1993) is a Scottish professional footballer who plays as a midfielder for Scottish League One club East Fife.

He has played for Hamilton Academical, Stenhousemuir, East Fife, Airdrieonians and Stranraer.

== Career ==
Millar made his senior debut for Hamilton Academical on 14 May 2011, in a 2–1 loss against Inverness Caledonian Thistle.

In March 2012, Millar signed for Stenhousemuir on loan, alongside Grant Anderson.

He signed a new two-year contract extension with Hamilton in April 2012. After missing the whole of the 2012–13 season to date due to injury, Miller returned to action in February 2013 after appearing in an under-20 match.

Millar left the club by mutual consent in August 2013, with a view to returning in the coming months, once he was clear of injuries.

In July 2014, Millar signed for Stenhousemuir again, this time on a one-year contract. Millar left Stenny after three years with the club, signing for East Fife on 29 May 2017.

In May 2018, Millar signed for Airdrieonians. At the end of the 2018–19 season, he signed a new one-year contract.

On 1 July 2020 he signed for Stranraer. he returned to East Fife in August 2021.

== Career statistics ==
As of 23 June 2023

| Club | Season | League | | | National Cup | | League Cup | | Other | | Total | |
| Club | Season | Division | Apps | Goals | Apps | Goals | Apps | Goals | Apps | Goals | Apps | Goals |
|---|---|---|---|---|---|---|---|---|---|---|---|---|
| Hamilton Academical | 2010–11 | Scottish Premier League | 1 | 0 | 0 | 0 | 0 | 0 | 0 | 0 | 1 | 0 |
| Hamilton Academical | 2011–12 | Scottish First Division | 2 | 0 | 0 | 0 | 0 | 0 | 0 | 0 | 2 | 0 |
| Hamilton Academical | 2012–13 | Scottish First Division | 0 | 0 | 0 | 0 | 0 | 0 | 0 | 0 | 0 | 0 |
| Hamilton Academical | Total | | 3 | 0 | 0 | 0 | 0 | 0 | 0 | 0 | 3 | 0 |
| Stenhousemuir (loan) | 2011–12 | Scottish Second Division | 5 | 0 | 0 | 0 | 0 | 0 | 0 | 0 | 5 | 0 |
| Stenhousemuir | 2014–15 | Scottish League One | 30 | 0 | 1 | 0 | 1 | 1 | 3 (Note: Appearances in the Scottish League One play-offs) | 1 | 35 | 2 |
| Stenhousemuir | 2015–16 | Scottish League One | 21 | 1 | 2 | 0 | 1 | 0 | 2 (Note: Appearances in the Scottish Challenge Cup) | 0 | 26 | 1 |
| Stenhousemuir | 2016–17 | Scottish League One | 32 | 1 | 3 | 0 | 4 | 0 | 2 | 0 | 41 | 1 |
| Stenhousemuir | Total | | 83 | 2 | 6 | 0 | 6 | 1 | 7 | 1 | 102 | 4 |
| East Fife | 2017–18 | Scottish League One | 33 | 0 | 2 | 0 | 2 | 0 | 1 | 0 | 38 | 0 |
| Airdrieonians | 2018–19 | Scottish League One | 30 | 0 | 2 | 0 | 3 | 0 | 1 | 0 | 36 | 0 |
| Airdrieonians | 2019–20 | Scottish League One | 26 | 0 | 2 | 0 | 4 | 0 | 2 | 0 | 34 | 0 |
| Airdrieonians | Total | | 56 | 0 | 4 | 0 | 7 | 0 | 3 | 0 | 70 | 0 |
| Stranraer | 2020–21 | Scottish League Two | 19 | 0 | 3 | 0 | 3 | 0 | 2 | 0 | 27 | 0 |
| Stranraer | 2021–22 | Scottish League Two | 2 | 0 | 0 | 0 | 3 | 0 | 0 | 0 | 5 | 0 |
| Stranraer | Total | | 21 | 0 | 3 | 0 | 6 | 0 | 2 | 0 | 32 | 0 |
| East Fife | 2021–22 | Scottish League One | 26 | 3 | 0 | 0 | 0 | 0 | 2 | 0 | 28 | 0 |
| East Fife | 2022–23 | Scottish League Two | 25 | 0 | 1 | 0 | 4 | 0 | 2 | 0 | 32 | 0 |
| East Fife | Total | | 49 | 3 | 1 | 0 | 4 | 0 | 3 | 0 | 56 | 0 |
| Career total | | | 252 | 5 | 16 | 0 | 25 | 1 | 17 | 1 | 309 | 7 |
