= Grant Anderson (footballer) =

Scottish footballer (born 1986)

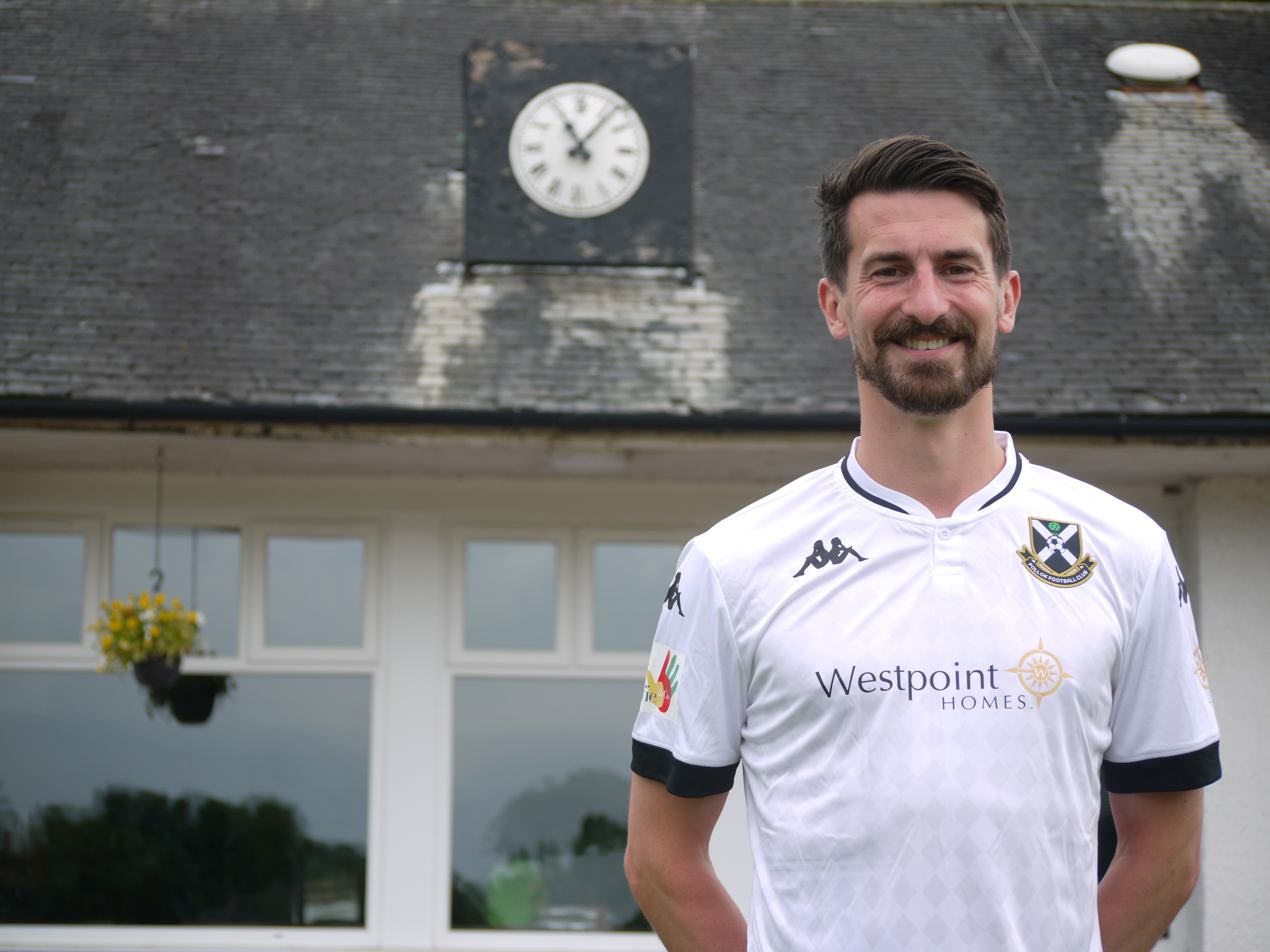

Personal information
- Date of birth: 20 August 1986 (age 40)
- Place of birth: Scotland
- Position: Winger

Team information
- Current team: Pollok

Senior career*
| Years | Team | Apps | (Gls) |
- Kirkintilloch Rob Roy
| 2010–2011 | Stenhousemuir | 33 | (7) |
| 2011–2012 | Hamilton Academical | 21 | (3) |
| 2012 | → Stenhousemuir (loan) | 6 | (3) |
| 2012–2016 | Raith Rovers | 123 | (12) |
| 2016–2017 | Queen of the South | 19 | (1) |
| 2017 | Peterhead | 14 | (3) |
| 2017–2019 | Stranraer | 67 | (13) |
| 2019–2020 | Raith Rovers | 22 | (4) |
| 2020–2021 | Kelty Hearts | | |
| 2021–2022 | Forfar Athletic | 0 | (0) |
| 2022-2023 | St Cadoc's | | |
| 2023- | Pollok | | |
- * Club domestic league appearances and goals as of 19th June 2023

Grant Anderson (born 20 August 1986) is a Scottish professional footballer who plays as a winger for Pollok.

== Career ==
After spending time with Kirkintilloch Rob Roy and Stenhousemuir, Anderson moved to Hamilton Academical in June 2011. Anderson debuted for the Accies on 23 July 2011 in the Scottish Challenge Cup, before making his SFL debut for the club a fortnight later. In March 2012, Anderson was sent out on loan to Stenhousemuir, alongside Kieran Millar. In May 2012, Anderson was released by the Lanarkshire club, after his return from a loan spell in Larbert.

In June 2012, Anderson joined Raith Rovers. After four seasons at Stark's Park, which included the winning goal in the Scottish Cup, Anderson signed for fellow Scottish Championship club Queen of the South on a one-year contract on 14 June 2016. On 20 January 2017 and after only half a season, Anderson departed Queens by mutual consent, subsequently signing for Scottish League One club Peterhead until the end of the 2016–17 season. In March 2017 he became a qualified referee. He was released at the end of the season following the club's relegation to Scottish League Two. After leaving Peterhead, Anderson moved to the opposite side of the country, signing for Scottish League One club Stranraer on 15 June 2017.

He returned to Raith Rovers in June 2019.

Kelty Hearts announced the signing of Anderson on 20 October 2020. He moved to Forfar Athletic on 1 February 2021. After playing for St Cadoc's, he signed for PollokIn June 2023 on a one-year deal.

== Career statistics ==
As of match played 28 October 2017

Appearances and goals by club, season and competition
| Club | Season | League | | | Scottish Cup | | League Cup | | Other | | Total | |
| Club | Season | Division | !Apps | Goals | Apps | Goals | Apps | Goals | Apps | Goals | Apps | Goals |
|---|---|---|---|---|---|---|---|---|---|---|---|---|
| Stenhousemuir | 2009–10 | Scottish Second Division | 1 | 0 | 0 | 0 | 0 | 0 | 0 | 0 | 1 | 0 |
| Stenhousemuir | 2010–11 | Scottish Second Division | 32 | 7 | 2 | 0 | 0 | 0 | 0 | 0 | 34 | 7 |
| Stenhousemuir | Total | | 33 | 7 | 2 | 0 | 0 | 0 | 0 | 0 | 35 | 7 |
| Hamilton Academical | 2011–12 | Scottish First Division | 21 | 3 | 2 | 0 | 1 | 0 | 1 (Note: Appearances in the Scottish Challenge Cup) | 0 | 25 | 3 |
| Stenhousemuir (loan) | 2011–12 | Scottish Second Division | 6 | 3 | 0 | 0 | 0 | 0 | 0 | 0 | 6 | 3 |
| Raith Rovers | 2012–13 | Scottish First Division | 33 | 4 | 2 | 0 | 3 | 0 | 2 | 1 | 40 | 5 |
| Raith Rovers | 2013–14 | Scottish Championship | 33 | 3 | 4 | 1 | 2 | 0 | 1 | 0 | 40 | 4 |
| Raith Rovers | 2014–15 | Scottish Championship | 31 | 3 | 4 | 1 | 2 | 0 | 0 | 0 | 37 | 4 |
| Raith Rovers | 2015–16 | Scottish Championship | 26 | 2 | 2 | 1 | 3 | 0 | 2 | 0 | 33 | 3 |
| Raith Rovers | Total | | 123 | 12 | 12 | 3 | 10 | 0 | 5 | 1 | 150 | 16 |
| Queen of the South | 2016–17 | Scottish Championship | 19 | 1 | 1 | 0 | 6 | 0 | 3 | 1 | 29 | 3 |
| Peterhead | 2016–17 | Scottish League One | 14 | 3 | 0 | 0 | 0 | 0 | 4 (Note: Appearances in the League One play-offs) | 0 | 18 | 3 |
| Stranraer | 2017–18 | Scottish League One | 10 | 3 | 0 | 0 | 4 | 0 | 2 | 0 | 16 | 3 |
| Career total | | | 226 | 32 | 17 | 3 | 21 | 0 | 15 | 2 | 270 | 39 |

== Honours ==
Raith Rovers

- Scottish Challenge Cup: 2013–14
