= List of Airdrieonians F.C. managers =

This is a list of Airdrieonians Football Club's managers, since its formation in 2002. The club have had ten permanent and six caretaker managers.

== List of managers ==
As of 1 January 2026

| * | Caretaker manager |

| Name | From | To |
|---|---|---|
| (Scotland) Sandy Stewart | 1 July 2002 | 13 November 2006 |
| (Scotland) Kenny Black | 17 November 2006 | 20 June 2010 |
| (Scotland) Jimmy Boyle | 20 June 2010 | 20 October 2013 |
| (Scotland) Gary Bollan | 24 October 2013 | 20 December 2015 |
| (Scotland) Eddie Wolecki Black | 22 December 2015 | 31 October 2016 |
| (Northern Ireland) Danny Lennon | 10 March 2016 | 30 April 2016 |
| (Scotland) Kevin McBride | 9 May 2016 | 31 October 2016 |
| (Scotland) Mark Wilson | 31 October 2016 | 17 June 2017 |
| (Scotland) Gordon Dalziel | 17 June 2017 | 4 August 2017 |
| (Scotland) Willie Aitchison | 4 August 2017 | 19 August 2017 |
| (Scotland) Stephen Findlay | 29 September 2017 | 8 October 2018 |
| (Scotland) Marc Fitzpatrick | 8 October 2018 | 19 October 2018 |
| (Scotland) Ian Murray | 19 October 2018 | 24 May 2022 |
| (Scotland) Rhys McCabe | 26 May 2022 | 15 August 2025 |
| (Antigua and Barbuda) Aaron Taylor-Sinclair | 18 August 2017 | 27 August 2025 |
| (Northern Ireland) Danny Lennon | 27 August 2025 | 22 October 2025 |
| (Antigua and Barbuda) Aaron Taylor-Sinclair | 1 January 2026 | 20 May 2026 |
| (Scotland) John Rankin | 23 May 2026 | present |
