= Chris O'Neil (footballer) =

Scottish footballer

Personal information
- Date of birth: 24 August 1995 (age 31)
- Height: 1.78 m (5 ft 10 in)
- Position: Defender

Team information
- Current team: Stenhousemuir

Senior career*
Years	Team	Apps	(Gls)
2012–2016	Airdrieonians	87	(0)
2016–2018	Brechin City	23	(1)
2018	→ Airdrieonians (loan)	7	(0)
2018–2019	Airdrieonians	15	(0)
2019–2020	Stenhousemuir	13	(0)
- * Club domestic league appearances and goals

Chris O'Neil (born 14 August 1995) is a Scottish former professional footballer who played as a defender.

== Career ==
O'Neil rejoined Airdrieonians on a permanent deal on 3 May 2018. He signed for Stenhousemuir in May 2019, leaving the club in January 2020.

== Career statistics ==
As of 23 March 2018

Appearances and goals by club, season and competition
Club	Season	League			Scottish Cup		League Cup		Other		Total	
Club	Season	Division	Apps	Goals	Apps	Goals	Apps	Goals	Apps	Goals	Apps	Goals
Airdrieonians (Note: 2012–13 as Airdrie United)	2012–13	Scottish First Division	24	0	0	0	0	0	0	0	24	0
Airdrieonians	2013–14	Scottish League One	6	0	0	0	1	0	1 (Note: Appearances in the Scottish Challenge Cup)	0	8	0
Airdrieonians	2014–15	Scottish League One	24	0	2	0	0	0	0	0	26	0
Airdrieonians	2015–16	Scottish League One	23	0	1	0	2	0	0	0	26	0
Airdrieonians	Total		77	0	3	0	3	0	1	0	84	0
Brechin City	2016–17	Scottish League One	19	0	0	0	4	0	1 (Note: Appearance in the Championship play-offs)	0	24	0
Brechin City	2017–18	Scottish Championship	4	1	0	0	1	0	1	0	6	1
Brechin City	Total		23	1	0	0	5	0	2	0	30	1
Airdrieonians	2017–18	Scottish League One	7	0	0	0	0	0	0	0	7	0
Career total			107	1	3	0	8	0	3	0	121	1
