= Jordan Sinclair =

Scottish footballer

Personal information
- Date of birth: 11 July 1996 (age 30)
- Position: Midfielder

Team information
- Current team: Berwick Rangers
- Number: 8

Senior career*
| Years | Team | Apps | (Gls) |
| 2015–2016 | Hibernian | 0 | (0) |
| 2016–2017 | Livingston | 6 | (0) |
| 2016–2019 | Brechin City | 47 | (8) |
| 2019–2020 | Edinburgh City | 13 | (0) |
| 2020– | Berwick Rangers | | |
- * Club domestic league appearances and goals as of 13:05, 6 April 2025 (UTC)

Jordan Sinclair (born 11 July 1996) is a Scottish professional footballer who plays for Berwick Rangers, as a midfielder.

== Career ==
He began his career with Hibernian, leaving the club at the end of the 2015–16 season. He then played for Livingston, and Brechin City.

He moved to Edinburgh City in June 2019, and to Berwick Rangers in June 2020. He signed a contract extension with Berwick in November 2022.

== Career statistics ==
As of match played 2 January 2018

Appearances and goals by club, season and competition
| Club | Season | League | | | Scottish Cup | | League Cup | | Other | | Total | |
| Club | Season | Division | Apps | Goals | Apps | Goals | Apps | Goals | Apps | Goals | Apps | Goals |
|---|---|---|---|---|---|---|---|---|---|---|---|---|
| Hibernian | 2015–16 | Championship | 0 | 0 | 0 | 0 | 1 | 0 | 0 | 0 | 1 | 0 |
| Livingston | 2016–17 | League One | 6 | 0 | 0 | 0 | 2 | 0 | 2 (Note: Appearances in the Scottish Challenge Cup) | 0 | 10 | 0 |
| Brechin City | 2017–18 | Championship | 19 | 5 | 1 | 1 | 2 | 0 | 0 | 0 | 22 | 6 |
| Career total | | | 25 | 5 | 1 | 1 | 5 | 0 | 2 | 0 | 33 | 6 |
