= Scott Robertson (footballer, born 1987) =

Scottish footballer

Personal information
- Full name: Scott Robertson
- Date of birth: 26 November 1987 (age 38)
- Place of birth: Irvine, Scotland
- Position: Defender

Team information
- Current team: Hurlford United
- Number: 2

Senior career*
| Years | Team | Apps | (Gls) |
| 2005–2009 | Queen of the South | 41 | (0) |
| 2009–2011 | Stirling Albion | 65 | (7) |
| 2011–2012 | Partick Thistle | 21 | (0) |
| 2012–2013 | Arbroath | 26 | (0) |
| 2013–2018 | Stranraer | 147 | (6) |
| 2018–2019 | Airdrieonians | 24 | (0) |
| 2019–2025 | Stranraer | 168 | (8) |
| 2025- | Hurlford United | 0 | (0) |
| Total | | 492 | (21) |
- * Club domestic league appearances and goals

Scott Robertson (born 26 November 1987 in Irvine) is a Scottish former footballer who played as a defender.

Robertson came on as a substitute during the second half of the 2008 Scottish Cup Final for Queen of the South. before moving to Stirling Albion for the 2009–10 season.

In June 2011, he left Forthbank after being offered a full-time contract by Fram Reykjavik after impressing the club on a week's trial. On 29 July 2011, he signed for Partick Thistle until the end of the 2011–12 season, after the proposed move to Reykjavik fell through, as a result of a change in the terms of the contract.

Robertson signed for Arbroath in the summer of 2012.

He signed for Stranraer in the summer of 2013.

Scott Robertson left Stranraer at the end of the 2017–18 season before joining Airdrieonians on 8 May 2018.

Robertson rejoined Stranraer in the summer of 2019 and has made 350 league appearances for the club. He retired in 2025 and made the move to west of scotland side Hurlford United.

== Career statistics ==
As of match played 6 November 2021

Appearances and goals by club, season and competition
| Club | Season | League | | | Scottish Cup | | League Cup | | Other | | Total | |
| Club | Season | Division | Apps | Goals | Apps | Goals | Apps | Goals | Apps | Goals | Apps | Goals |
|---|---|---|---|---|---|---|---|---|---|---|---|---|
| Queen of the South | 2005–06 | Scottish First Division | 7 | 0 | 2 | 0 | 0 | 0 | 0 | 0 | 9 | 0 |
| Queen of the South | 2006–07 | Scottish First Division | 10 | 0 | 3 | 0 | 0 | 0 | 1 (Note: Appearances in the Scottish Challenge Cup) | 0 | 14 | 0 |
| Queen of the South | 2007–08 | Scottish First Division | 14 | 0 | 2 | 0 | 0 | 0 | 0 | 0 | 16 | 0 |
| Queen of the South | 2008–09 | Scottish First Division | 10 | 0 | 1 | 0 | 1 | 0 | 0 | 0 | 12 | 0 |
| Queen of the South | Total | | 41 | 0 | 8 | 0 | 1 | 0 | 1 | 0 | 51 | 0 |
| Stirling Albion | 2009–10 | Scottish Second Division | 33 | 6 | 4 | 0 | 1 | 0 | 3 | 1 | 41 | 7 |
| Stirling Albion | 2010–11 | Scottish Second Division | 32 | 1 | 1 | 0 | 1 | 0 | 2 | 0 | 36 | 1 |
| Stirling Albion | Total | | 65 | 7 | 5 | 0 | 2 | 0 | 5 | 1 | 77 | 8 |
| Partick Thistle | 2011–12 | Scottish First Division | 21 | 0 | 3 | 0 | 3 | 0 | 1 | 0 | 28 | 0 |
| Arbroath | 2012–13 | Scottish Second Division | 26 | 0 | 4 | 0 | 1 | 0 | 3 | 1 | 34 | 1 |
| Stranraer | 2013–14 | Scottish League One | 35 | 1 | 6 | 0 | 3 | 1 | 3 (Note: One appearance in the Scottish Challenge Cup and two in the Championship play-offs) | 0 | 47 | 2 |
| Stranraer | 2014–15 | Scottish League One | 15 | 0 | 1 | 0 | 2 | 0 | 5 (Note: Three appearances in the Scottish Challenge Cup and two in the Championship play-offs) | 0 | 23 | 0 |
| Stranraer | 2015–16 | Scottish League One | 32 | 2 | 2 | 0 | 2 | 0 | 5 (Note: One appearance in the Scottish Challenge Cup and four in the Championship play-offs) | 0 | 41 | 2 |
| Stranraer | 2016–17 | Scottish League One | 34 | 1 | 2 | 0 | 4 | 0 | 3 | 0 | 43 | 1 |
| Stranraer | 2017–18 | Scottish League One | 31 | 2 | 1 | 0 | 4 | 1 | 3 | 0 | 39 | 3 |
| Stranraer | Total | | 147 | 6 | 12 | 0 | 15 | 2 | 19 | 0 | 193 | 8 |
| Airdrieonians | 2018–19 | Scottish League One | 24 | 0 | 0 | 0 | 4 | 0 | 2 | 0 | 30 | 0 |
| Stranraer | 2019–20 | Scottish League One | 25 | 2 | 2 | 0 | 4 | 0 | 1 | 0 | 32 | 2 |
| Stranraer | 2020–21 | Scottish League Two | 22 | 0 | 3 | 1 | 4 | 0 | 2 (Note: Appearances in the League One play-offs) | 0 | 31 | 1 |
| Stranraer | 2021–22 | Scottish League Two | 12 | 0 | 0 | 0 | 3 | 0 | 1 | 0 | 16 | 0 |
| Stranraer | Total | | 59 | 2 | 5 | 1 | 11 | 0 | 4 | 0 | 79 | 3 |
| Career total | | | 342 | 15 | 29 | 1 | 36 | 2 | 34 | 2 | 441 | 20 |
