= Finn Graham =

Scottish footballer

Personal information
- Full name: Finn Graham
- Date of birth: 5 March 1996 (age 30)
- Place of birth: Kirkcaldy, Scotland
- Position: Midfielder

Team information
- Current team: Dundonald Bluebell

Youth career
- 2004–2013: Dunfermline Athletic

Senior career*
Years	Team	Apps	(Gls)
2013–2015	Dunfermline Athletic	5	(0)
2015–2016	Berwick Rangers	34	(5)
2016–2018	Brechin City	66	(3)
2018	Arbroath	0	(0)
2018–2019	Kelty Hearts		
2019–2020	Stirling Lions		
2020–2021	Inverkeithing Hillfield Swifts		
2021–2024	Crossgates Primrose		
2024–	Dundonald Bluebell		
- * Club domestic league appearances and goals as of 16:05, 2 February 2019 (GMT)

Finn Graham (born 5 March 1996) is a Scottish professional footballer who plays as a midfielder for Scottish club Dundonald Bluebell F.C. He has previously played for Arbroath, Dunfermline Athletic, Berwick Rangers, Brechin City and Kelty Hearts.

== Career ==
Born in Kirkcaldy, Graham began his career with Kelty Marian Colts before joining Dunfermline Athletic as a youth player in 2004. After a limited number of first team opportunities, Graham was released by Dunfermline in May 2015 and subsequently dropped down a division to Scottish League Two, signing for Berwick Rangers on a one-year deal. After a successful season with Berwick, Graham was signed by Scottish League One club Brechin City. He spent two seasons with Brechin, before signing for Arbroath in July 2018, following a successful trial period. on 22 November, Graham became Barry Ferguson's first signing for Lowland league team Kelty Hearts on a short term deal. Graham moved to Australia in February 2019 to sign with Stirling Lions SC.

== Career statistics ==
As of 21 July 2018

Appearances and goals by club, season and competition
Club	Season	League			Scottish Cup		League Cup		Other		Total	
Club	Season	Division	Apps	Goals	Apps	Goals	Apps	Goals	Apps	Goals	Apps	Goals
Dunfermline Athletic	2013–14	Scottish League One	1	0	0	0	0	0	0	0	1	0
Dunfermline Athletic	2014–15	Scottish League One	4	0	0	0	0	0	0	0	4	0
Dunfermline Athletic	Total		5	0	0	0	0	0	0	0	5	0
Berwick Rangers (loan)	2015–16	Scottish League Two	34	5	1	0	2	0	1 (Note: Appearances in the Scottish Challenge Cup)	0	38	5
Brechin City	2016–17	Scottish League One	32	1	0	0	4	0	6 (Note: Two appearances and a goal in the Scottish Challenge Cup; four appearances in the Championship play-offs)	1	42	2
Brechin City	2017–18	Scottish Championship	34	2	0	0	3	0	1	0	40	2
Brechin City	Total		66	3	0	0	7	0	7	1	82	4
Arbroath	2018–19	Scottish League One	0	0	0	0	0	0	0	0	0	0
Career total			105	8	1	0	9	0	8	1	125	9
