= 2011–12 Stenhousemuir F.C. season =

Stenhousemuir
2011–12 season
- Chairman: Martin McNairney
- Manager: Davie Irons
- Stadium: Ochilview Park
- Scottish Second Division: Fifth place
- Challenge Cup: First round, lost to Partick Thistle
- League Cup: Second round, lost to Falkirk
- Scottish Cup: Fourth round, lost to Ross County
- Top goalscorer: League: (Scotland) Rodgers (14); All: (Scotland) Rodgers (17)
- Highest home attendance: 903 vs. Airdrie United, 7 April 2012
- Lowest home attendance: 486 vs. Albion Rovers, 24 March 2012

The 2011–12 season was Stenhousemuir's third consecutive season in the Scottish Second Division, having been promoted from the Scottish Third Division at the end of the 2008–09 season. Stenhousemuir also competed in the Challenge Cup, League Cup and the Scottish Cup.

== Summary ==
Stenhousemuir finished fifth in the Second Division. They reached the first round of the Challenge Cup, the second round of the League Cup and the fourth round of the Scottish Cup.

== Results & fixtures ==
=== Preseason ===
Win Draw Loss Postponed

2 July 2011 Friendly	Montrose	2–0	Stenhousemuir	Links Park, Montrose
15:00	Boyle 16'; Johnston 40'	Stenhousemuir Report		Referee: Matt Northcroft

9 July 2011 Friendly	Stenhousemuir	1–3	Annan Athletic	Ochilview Park, Stenhousemuir
15:00	Rodgers 13'	Stenhousemuir Report	Felvus 27', 55'; Muirhead 28'	Referee: Gary Hilland

16 July 2011 Friendly	Stenhousemuir	1–1	Clyde	Ochilview Park, Stenhousemuir
15:00	Kean 63'	Stenhousemuir Report	McDonald 68'	Referee: Kevin Graham

=== Scottish Second Division ===
6 August 2011 SSD	Brechin City	2–0	Stenhousemuir	Glebe Park Brechin
15:00	David McKenna 71'; McManus 80'	BBC Report		Attendance: 442; Referee: Craig Charleston

13 August 2011 SSD	Stenhousemuir	2–0	Arbroath	Ochilview Park, Stenhousemuir
15:00	Ferguson 13'; Rodgers 56'	BBC Report		Attendance: 492; Referee: Gary Hilland

20 August 2011 SSD	Forfar Athletic	2–3	Stenhousemuir	Station Park, Forfar
15:00	Templeman 55'; Mowat 57'	BBC Report	Ferguson 22'; Kean 25'; Thomson 62'	Attendance: 372; Referee: Mike Tumilty

27 August 2011 SSD	Stenhousemuir	3–1	Cowdenbeath	Ochilview Park, Stenhousemuir
15:00	Rodgers 56'; McHale 72'; Ferguson 77'	BBC Report	Adamson 69'	Attendance: 621; Referee: Salmond

10 September 2011 SSD	Stirling Albion	2–2	Stenhousemuir	Doubletree Dunblane Stadium
	Davieson 59'; Cook 89' (pen.)	BBC Report	Paton 39' (pen.); Thomson 69'	Attendance: 649; Referee: McKendrick

17 September 2011 SSD	Albion Rovers	1–1	Stenhousemuir	Cliftonhill
	Acqua 83'	BBC Report	Murray 67'	Attendance: 369; Referee: Hilland

24 September 2011 SSD	Stenhousemuir	2–1	East Fife	Ochilview Park, Stenhousemuir
	Kean 19'; Rodgers 88'	BBC Report	Wallace 56'	Attendance: 642; Referee: Beaton

1 October 2011 SSD	Airdrie United	5–2	Stenhousemuir	Excelsior Stadium
	Donnelly 10', 66'; Lovering 27'; Boyle 45'; Blockley 83'; Lilley (red card) 90'	BBC Report	Hamilton 51'; Kean 56'	Attendance: 698; Referee: Muir

15 October 2011 SSD	Stenhousemuir	3–1	Dumbarton	Ochilview Park, Stenhousemuir
15:00	Rodgers 29'; McMillan 45', 77'	BBC Report	Agnew 85'	Attendance: 529; Referee: Somers

22 October 2011 SSD	Stenhousemuir	1–1	Brechin City	Ochilview Park, Stenhousemuir
15:00	Dickson 40'	BBC Report	King 29' (pen.); Hodge (red card) 35'	Attendance: 681; Referee: Colvin

29 October 2011 SSD	Arbroath	1–0	Stenhousemuir	Gayfield Park, Arbroath
	Doris 84' (pen.)	BBC Report	McCluskey (red card) 82'	Attendance: 572; Referee: Salmond

5 October 2011 SSD	Stenhousemuir	4–0	Stirling Albion	Ochilview Park, Stenhousemuir
15:00	Kean 54', 80'; McMillan 63'; Ferguson 69'	BBC Report		Attendance: 829; Referee: Clancy

12 November 2011 SSD	Cowdenbeath	2–0	Stenhousemuir	Central Park, Cowdenbeath
	Stewart 15'; Coult 87'	BBC Report		Attendance: 374; Referee: McDermott

26 November 2011 SSD	Stenhousemuir	3–0	Albion Rovers	Ochilview Park, Stenhousemuir
15:00	Kean 57'; Rodgers 80', 85'	SFL Report		Attendance: 561; Referee: Northcroft

3 December 2011 SSD	East Fife	1–3	Stenhousemuir	Bayview Stadium, Methil
15:00	Linn 80'	SFL Report	Kean 15'; Rodgers 48'; Quinn 90'	Attendance: 508; Referee: Winter

10 December 2011 SSD	Stenhousemuir	1–1	Airdrie United	Ochilview Park, Stenhousemuir
15:00	Rodgers 4'	SFL Report	McLaren 69'	Attendance: 698; Referee: Northcroft

17 December 2011 SSD	Dumbarton	P – P	Stenhousemuir	Dumbarton Football Stadium, Dumbarton
15:00

26 December 2011 SSD	Stenhousemuir	0–2	Cowdenbeath	Ochilview Park, Stenhousemuir
15:00		SFL Report	Stewart 37'; Coult 88'	Attendance: 576; Referee: Hilland

2 January 2012 SSD	Stirling Albion	3–1	Stenhousemuir	Doubletree Dunblane Stadium
15:00	Cook 54'; Thom 69'; Flood 90'	SFL Report	Thomson 83'	Attendance: 578; Referee: Charleston

14 January 2012 SSD	Stenhousemuir	2–3	Forfar Athletic	Ochilview Park, Stenhousemuir
15:00	McMillan 42'; McCulloch 71' (o.g.)	SFL Report	Templeman 43', 80'; Fotheringham 90'	Attendance: 454; Referee: Roache

21 January 2012 SSD	Brechin City	P – P	Stenhousemuir	Glebe Park, Brechin
15:00

28 January 2012 SSD	Stenhousemuir	1–0	East Fife	Ochilview Park, Stenhousemuir
15:00	Rodgers 59'	SFL Report		Attendance: 687; Referee: Conroy

4 February 2012 SSD	Albion Rovers	P – P	Stenhousemuir	Cliftonhill, Coatbridge
15:00

11 February 2012 SSD	Stenhousemuir	1–2	Dumbarton	Ochilview Park, Stenhousemuir
15:00	McMillan (red card) 10'; McKinlay (yellow card) 33' (red card); Smith 76'	SFL Report	Lithgow 36'; Devlin 45' (Own goal)	Referee: Beaton

18 February 2012 SSD	Airdrie United	0–3	Stenhousemuir	Excelsior Stadium
15:00		SFL Report	Dickson 4'; Smith 45', 66'	Attendance: 685; Referee: Tumilty

21 February 2012 SSD	Brechin City	1–0	Stenhousemuir	Glebe Park
19:45	McKenzie 70'	SFL Report		Attendance: 347; Referee: Salmond

25 February 2012 SSD	Stenhousemuir	1–3	Arbroath	Ochilview Park, Stenhousemuir
15:00	Kean 70'	SFL Report	Doris 9'; Falkingham 37', 88'	Referee: Madden

28 February 2012 SSD	Dumbarton	3–0	Stenhousemuir	Dumbarton Football Stadium
19:45	Prunty 1'; Gilhaney 32'; Agnew 74'	SFL Report		Attendance: 557; Referee: Charleston

3 March 2012 SSD	Forfar Athletic	1–2	Stenhousemuir	Station Park
15:00	Low 56'	SFL Report	Ferguson 13'; Kean 53'	Attendance: 374; Referee: Northcroft

6 March 2012 SSD	Albion Rovers	1–0	Stenhousemuir	Cliftonhill
19:45	Werndly 83'	SFL Report		Attendance: 268; Referee: Richmond

10 March 2012 SSD	Stenhousemuir	4–0	Stirling Albion	Ochilview Park, Stenhousemuir
15:00	Kean 2'; Rodgers 55', 81'; Campbell 57'	SFL Report		Attendance: 674; Referee: Allan

17 March 2012 SSD	Cowdenbeath	0–0	Stenhousemuir	Central Park, Cowdenbeath
15:00		SFL Report		Attendance: 367; Referee: Colvin

24 March 2012 SSD	Stenhousemuir	1–2	Albion Rovers	Ochilview Park, Stenhousemuir
15:00	Rodgers 25'	SFL Report	Werndly 33'; McStay 50'	Attendance: 486; Referee: McKendrick

31 March 2012 SSD	East Fife	1–1	Stenhousemuir	Bayview Stadium, Methil
15:00	Wallace 8'; White (yellow card) 88' (yellow-red card)	SFL Report	Ferguson 81' (pen.)	Attendance: 742; Referee: Cook

7 April 2012 SSD	Stenhousemuir	0–3	Airdrie United	Ochilview Park, Stenhousemuir
15:00		SFL Report	Lynch 7'; McLaren 45'; Blockley 81'; Lynch (yellow card) 91' (red card)	Attendance: 903; Referee: Winter

14 April 2012 SSD	Dumbarton	0–2	Stenhousemuir	Dumbarton Football Stadium, Dumbarton
15:00		SFL Report	Ferguson 5' (pen.); Rodgers 11'; Millar (yellow card) 90' (yellow-red card)	Attendance: 728; Referee: Clancy

21 April 2012 SSD	Stenhousemuir	2–1	Brechin City	Ochilview Park, Stenhousemuir
15:00	Thomson 17'; Anderson 60'	SFL Report	Lister 82'	Attendance: 541; Referee: Roache

28 April 2012 SSD	Arbroath	0–2	Stenhousemuir	Gayfield Park
15:00		SFL Report	Anderson 11'; Rodgers 20'	Attendance: 643; Referee: Northcroft

5 May 2012 SSD	Stenhousemuir	1–2	Forfar Athletic	Ochilview Park, Stenhousemuir
15:00	Anderson 15'	SFL Report	McMillan 4' (Own goal); Fotheringham 22'	Attendance: 759; Referee: Aitken

=== Scottish Cup ===
19 November 2011 Scottish Cup round 3	Stenhousemuir	4–0	Annan Athletic	Ochilview Park, Stenhousemuir
15:00	Kean 9'; Rodgers 17', 22', 37'	BBC Report		Attendance: 602; Referee: McKendrick

7 January 2012 Scottish Cup round 4	Ross County	7–0	Stenhousemuir	Victoria Park, Dingwall
15:00	Vigurs 5', 75'; Brittain 52' (Penalty); Gardyne 62'; Craig 71'; Byrne 87', 88'	BBC Report		Attendance: 1,421; Referee: Allan

=== Scottish League Cup ===
30 July 2011 Scottish League Cup round 1	Cowdenbeath	2–2 (a.e.t.) (3–4 p)	Stenhousemuir	Central Park, Cowdenbeath
15:00	Ramsay 28', 40'	BBC Report	Lyle 4'; Paton 53'	Attendance: 293; Referee: John McKendrick
	Penalties
	Cameron (penalty missed); Robertson (penalty scored); Ramsay (penalty scored); McKenzie (penalty scored); Stewart (penalty missed)		Paton (penalty scored); Murray (penalty scored); Andy Rodgers (penalty scored); Thomson (penalty scored); Kean (penalty missed)

24 August 2011 Scottish League Cup round 2	Falkirk	3–1	Stenhousemuir	Falkirk Stadium, Falkirk
19:30	Ferguson 47' (o.g.); Sibbald 49'; El Alagui 90'	BBC Report	Paton 25'	Attendance: 2,134; Referee: Alan Muir

=== Scottish Challenge Cup ===
23 July 2011 Scottish Challenge Cup round 1	Partick Thistle	2–1	Stenhousemuir	Firhill Stadium, Maryhill
15:00	Rowson 20'; Stewart 82'	BBC Report	Kean 86'	Attendance: 1,292; Referee: Stephen Finnie

=== Squad ===
Last updated 5 May 2012

No.	Pos	Nat	Player	Total		Scottish Second Division		Scottish Cup		League Cup		Challenge Cup	
No.	Pos	Nat	Player	Apps	Goals	Apps	Goals	Apps	Goals	Apps	Goals	Apps	Goals
	GK	(Scotland) SCO	Alistair Brown	31	0	27+1	0	2+0	0	1+0	0	0+0	0
	GK	(Scotland) SCO	Sean Diamond	0	0	0+0	0	0+0	0	0+0	0	0+0	0
	GK	(Scotland) SCO	Chris McCluskey	11	0	8+0	0	0+0	0	1+1	0	1+0	0
	GK	(Scotland) SCO	Dean Shaw	1	0	1+0	0	0+0	0	0+0	0	0+0	0
	DF	(Scotland) SCO	Martyn Corrigan	24	0	19+0	0	2+0	0	2+0	0	1+0	0
	DF	(Scotland) SCO	Jack Hamilton	2	0	0+2	0	0+0	0	0+0	0	0+0	0
	DF	(Scotland) SCO	Alan Lawson	10	0	5+4	0	0+1	0	0+0	0	0+0	0
	DF	(Scotland) SCO	Willie Lyle	34	1	27+2	0	2+0	0	2+0	1	1+0	0
	DF	(Scotland) SCO	Kevin McKinlay	33	0	26+3	0	2+0	0	1+0	0	1+0	0
	DF	(Scotland) SCO	Ross McMillan	35	4	29+1	4	2+0	0	1+1	0	1+0	0
	DF	(Scotland) SCO	Colin Hamilton (footballer)	8	1	6+2	1	0+0	0	0+0	0	0+0	0
	DF	(Scotland) SCO	Jamie Campbell	8	1	6+1	1	1+0	0	0+0	0	0+0	0
	DF	(Scotland) SCO	Michael Devlin	13	0	12+1	0	0+0	0	0+0	0	0+0	0
	DF	(Scotland) SCO	Nicky Devlin	6	0	6+0	0	0+0	0	0+0	0	0+0	0
	MF	(Scotland) SCO	Grant Anderson	6	3	6+0	3	0+0	0	0+0	0	0+0	0
	MF	(Scotland) SCO	Sean Dickson	30	2	15+10	2	1+1	0	2+0	0	0+1	0
	MF	(Scotland) SCO	Brown Ferguson	36	7	31+0	7	2+0	0	2+0	0	1+0	0
	MF	(Scotland) SCO	Michael Hunter	0	0	0+0	0	0+0	0	0+0	0	0+0	0
	MF	(Scotland) SCO	Joseph McCafferty	5	0	2+3	0	0+0	0	0+0	0	0+0	0
	MF	(Scotland) SCO	Paul McHale	21	1	12+5	1	1+0	0	2+0	0	1+0	0
	MF	(Scotland) SCO	Kieran Millar	5	0	5+0	0	0+0	0	0+0	0	0+0	0
	MF	(Scotland) SCO	Stevie Murray	34	1	23+7	1	1+0	0	2+0	0	1+0	0
	MF	(Scotland) SCO	Eric Paton	30	3	24+2	1	1+0	0	2+0	2	1+0	0
	MF	(Scotland) SCO	Iain Thomson	38	4	29+5	4	2+0	0	0+1	0	0+1	0
	FW	(Scotland) SCO	Shaun Fraser	3	0	0+3	0	0+0	0	0+0	0	0+0	0
	FW	(Scotland) SCO	Stewart Kean	41	12	36+0	10	2+0	1	2+0	0	1+0	1
	FW	(Scotland) SCO	Stuart Love	0	0	0+0	0	0+0	0	0+0	0	0+0	0
	FW	(Scotland) SCO	Grant Plenderleith	8	0	0+4	0	0+2	0	0+1	0	0+1	0
	FW	(Scotland) SCO	Paul Quinn	15	1	2+11	1	0+1	0	0+1	0	0+0	0
	FW	(Scotland) SCO	Andy Rodgers	38	17	28+5	14	1+1	3	2+0	0	1+0	0
	FW	(Scotland) SCO	Gary Smith	10	3	5+5	3	0+0	0	0+0	0	0+0	0
	FW	(Scotland) SCO	Kieran Anderson	1	0	0+1	0	0+0	0	0+0	0	0+0	0
	FW	(Scotland) SCO	Kenny Deuchar	9	0	6+3	0	0+0	0	0+0	0	0+0	0
	FW	(Scotland) SCO	Sean Fitzharris	3	0	2+1	0	0+0	0	0+0	0	0+0	0

=== Disciplinary record ===
Includes all competitive matches.

Last updated 5 May 2012

Nation	Position	Name	Scottish Second Division		Scottish Cup		League Cup		Challenge Cup		Total	
Nation	Position	Name	Booked	Sent off (straight red)	Booked	Sent off (straight red)	Booked	Sent off (straight red)	Booked	Sent off (straight red)	Booked	Sent off (straight red)
(Scotland)	GK	Alistair Brown	2	0	0	0	0	0	0	0	2	0
(Scotland)	GK	Sean Diamond	0	0	0	0	0	0	0	0	0	0
(Scotland)	GK	Chris McCluskey	1	1	0	0	0	0	0	0	1	1
(Scotland)	GK	Dean Shaw	0	0	0	0	0	0	0	0	0	0
(Scotland)	DF	Martyn Corrigan	0	0	0	0	1	0	0	0	1	0
(Scotland)	DF	Jack Hamilton	0	0	0	0	0	0	0	0	0	0
(Scotland)	DF	Alan Lawson	1	0	0	0	0	0	0	0	1	0
(Scotland)	DF	Willie Lyle	7	0	1	0	0	0	1	0	9	0
(Scotland)	DF	Kevin McKinlay	4	1	0	0	0	0	1	0	4	1
(Scotland)	DF	Ross McMillan	7	1	0	1	0	0	0	0	7	2
(Scotland)	DF	Colin Hamilton (footballer)	1	0	0	0	0	0	0	0	1	0
(Scotland)	DF	Jamie Campbell	0	0	0	0	0	0	0	0	0	0
(Scotland)	DF	Michael Devlin	0	0	0	0	0	0	0	0	0	0
(Scotland)	DF	Nicky Devlin	1	0	0	0	0	0	0	0	1	0
(Scotland)	DF	Grant Anderson	1	0	0	0	0	0	0	0	1	0
(Scotland)	MF	Sean Dickson	1	0	0	0	0	0	0	0	1	0
(Scotland)	MF	Brown Ferguson	1	0	0	0	0	0	0	0	1	0
(Scotland)	MF	Michael Hunter	0	0	0	0	0	0	0	0	0	0
(Scotland)	MF	Joseph McCafferty	0	0	0	0	0	0	0	0	0	0
(Scotland)	MF	Paul McHale	4	0	0	0	0	0	0	0	4	0
(Scotland)	MF	Kieran Millar	3	1	0	0	0	0	0	0	3	1
(Scotland)	MF	Stevie Murray	4	0	0	0	0	0	0	0	4	0
(Scotland)	MF	Eric Paton	3	0	0	0	0	0	0	0	3	0
(Scotland)	MF	Iain Thomson	7	0	0	0	0	0	0	0	7	0
(Scotland)	FW	Shaun Fraser	0	0	0	0	0	0	0	0	0	0
(Scotland)	FW	Stewart Kean	6	0	1	0	0	0	0	0	7	0
(Scotland)	FW	Stuart Love	0	0	0	0	0	0	0	0	0	0
(Scotland)	FW	Grant Plenderleith	0	0	0	0	0	0	0	0	0	0
(Scotland)	FW	Paul Quinn	1	0	0	0	0	0	0	0	1	0
(Scotland)	FW	Andy Rodgers	9	0	1	0	1	0	0	0	11	0
(Scotland)	FW	Gary Smith	0	0	0	0	0	0	0	0	0	0
(Scotland)	FW	Kieran Anderson	0	0	0	0	0	0	0	0	0	0
(Scotland)	FW	Kenny Deuchar	1	0	0	0	0	0	0	0	1	0
(Scotland)	FW	Sean Fitzharris	0	0	0	0	0	0	0	0	0	0

=== Awards ===
Last updated 14 May 2012

Nation	Name	Award	Month
(Scotland)	Nicky Devlin	Young Player of the Month	April

== Team statistics ==
=== League table ===
Pos	Team	Pld	W	D	L	GF	GA	GD	Pts	Promotion, qualification or relegation
3	Dumbarton (O, P)	36	17	7	12	61	61	0	58 (Note: Dumbarton won the First Division play-off final, and were promoted to the First Division.)	Qualification for the First Division play-offs
4	Airdrie United (P)	36	14	10	12	68	60	+8	52 (Note: Airdrie United lost the final of the First Division playoffs to Dumbarton. However following the demotion of Rangers to the third division prior to the beginning of the 2012-13 season, Dundee were promoted from the First Division to the SPL, and Airdrie United were promoted to the First Division to take their place. Stranraer were promoted from the Third to the Second Division to take the place of Airdrie United)	Qualification for the First Division play-offs
5	Stenhousemuir	36	15	6	15	54	49	+5	51	
6	East Fife	36	14	6	16	55	57	−2	48	
7	Forfar Athletic	36	11	9	16	59	72	−13	42	

Source: SPFL Archive
Rules for classification: 1) points; 2) goal difference; 3) number of goals scored.
(O) Play-off winners; (P) Promoted

== Transfers ==
=== Players in ===
Player	From	Fee
(Scotland) Andy Rodgers	(Scotland) Ayr United	Free
(Scotland) Stewart Kean	(Scotland) Greenock Morton	Free
(Scotland) Kevin McKinlay	(Scotland) Greenock Morton	Free
(Scotland) Shaun Fraser	(Scotland) Partick Thistle	Loan
(Scotland) Joseph McCafferty	(Scotland) Falkirk	Free
(Scotland) Martyn Corrigan	(Scotland) Stirling Albion	Free
(Scotland) Paul McHale	(Scotland) Stirling Albion	Free
(Scotland) Ross McMillan	(Scotland) Clyde	Free
(Scotland) Brown Ferguson	(Scotland) Alloa Athletic	Free
(Scotland) Colin Hamilton	(Scotland) Heart of Midlothian	Loan
(Scotland) Jamie Campbell	(Scotland) Partick Thistle	Loan
(Scotland) Gary Smith	(Scotland) Motherwell	Loan
(Scotland) Michael Devlin	(Scotland) Hamilton Academical	Loan
(Scotland) Kenny Deuchar	(Scotland) Livingston	Loan
(Scotland) Nicky Devlin	(Scotland) Motherwell	Loan
(Scotland) Grant Anderson	(Scotland) Hamilton Academical	Loan
(Scotland) Kieran Millar	(Scotland) Hamilton Academical	Loan

=== Players out ===
Player	To	Fee
(Scotland) Grant Anderson	(Scotland) Hamilton Academical	Free
(Scotland) Scott Fusco	(Scotland) Spartans	Free
(Scotland) Jordan Smith	(Scotland) Pollok	Free
(Scotland) Andrew Stirling	(Scotland) East Stirlingshire	Free
(Scotland) Pat Scullion	(Scotland) Clyde	Free
(Scotland) Scott Dalziel	(Scotland) East Fife	Free
(Scotland) Stephen Thompson	(Scotland) Berwick Rangers	Free
(Scotland) Ross Clark	(Scotland) Albion Rovers	Free
(Scotland) Gary Thom	(Scotland) Stirling Albion	Free
(Scotland) Scott Gibb	(Scotland) Bo'ness United	Free
(Scotland) Alex Williams	Free agent	Free
(Scotland) Lewis Sloan	(Scotland) Glenafton Athletic	Free
(Scotland) Brian Gilmour	(Iceland) Knattspyrnufélag Akureyrar	Free
(Scotland) Stuart Love	(Scotland) East Stirlingshire	Loan
(Scotland) Michael Hunter	(Scotland) East Stirlingshire	Loan
(Scotland) Paul Quinn	(Scotland) Albion Rovers	Free
(Scotland) Grant Plenderleith	(Scotland) Bo'ness United	Loan
