= Michael Travis (soccer) =

South African soccer player (born 1993)

Personal information
- Date of birth: 6 May 1993 (age 33)
- Place of birth: Pietermaritzburg, South Africa
- Position: Defender

Team information
- Current team: Bo'ness United

Senior career*
Years	Team	Apps	(Gls)
2011–2012	Livingston	1	(0)
2012–2014	Arbroath	57	(7)
2015–2022	Forfar Athletic	130	(12)
2022	Edinburgh City	17	(1)
2022–2023	Berwick Rangers	39	(7)
2023–	Bo'ness United	34	(5)
- * Club domestic league appearances and goals as of 14 December 2024

Michael Travis (born 6 May 1993) is a South African soccer player who plays as a defender for Scottish Lowland League East club Bo'ness United. He has previously played for Forfar Athletic, Livingston, Arbroath, Edinburgh City and Berwick Rangers and has also played as a trialist for Montrose.

== Career ==
=== Livingston ===
A member of the under-19 team Travis made his first team debut on 23 July 2011 as a substitute in Livingston's 5–0 win against Airdrie United in the Challenge Cup. He appeared again as a sub in the next round against Stirling. He made his league debut in the Scottish First Division as a substitute on 24 September against Partick Thistle. He was released by the club at the end of the 2011–12 season.

=== Arbroath ===
In July 2012, Travis signed for Scottish Second Division side Arbroath. On 8 November 2014, Travis announced that he had left Arbroath. After leaving Arbroath, Travis played as a trialist for Forfar Athletic and Montrose.

=== Forfar Athletic ===
In January 2015, Travis signed for Scottish League One side Forfar Athletic.

=== Edinburgh City ===
After playing for the club as a trialist in a match just two days previous, Travis officially signed for Scottish League Two side Edinburgh City on 9 January 2022.

=== Berwick Rangers ===
Travis signed for Berwick Rangers in September 2022.

== Career statistics ==
As of match played 15 February 2020

Appearances and goals by club, season and competition
Club	Season	League			Scottish Cup		League Cup		Other		Total	
Club	Season	Division	Apps	Goals	Apps	Goals	Apps	Goals	Apps	Goals	Apps	Goals
Livingston	2011–12	Scottish First Division	1	0	0	0	0	0	2 (Note: Appearances in the Scottish Challenge Cup)	0	3	0
Arbroath	2012–13	Scottish Second Division	19	2	0	0	2	0	2	0	23	2
Arbroath	2013–14	Scottish League One	34	5	1	0	1	0	1	0	37	5
Arbroath	2014–15	Scottish League Two	4	0	1	0	1	0	1	0	7	0
Arbroath	Total		57	7	2	0	4	0	4	0	67	7
Forfar Athletic	2014–15	Scottish League One	17	1	0	0	0	0	4 (Note: Appearances in the Championship play-offs)	1	21	2
Forfar Athletic	2015–16	Scottish League One	12	4	2	2	2	0	2	0	18	6
Forfar Athletic	2016–17	Scottish League Two	18	1	0	0	0	0	4 (Note: Appearances in the League One play-offs)	2	22	3
Forfar Athletic	2017–18	Scottish League One	34	3	1	0	4	0	1	0	40	3
Forfar Athletic	2018–19	Scottish League One	30	1	1	0	4	0	3	0	38	1
Forfar Athletic	2019–20	Scottish League One	16	2	1	0	4	3	1	0	22	5
Forfar Athletic	Total		127	12	5	2	14	3	19	3	165	20
Career total			190	19	7	2	18	3	19	3	234	27

== Personal life ==
He is the cousin of Scottish international footballer Callum Paterson.
