= 2012–13 Arbroath F.C. season =

Arbroath
2012–13 season
- Manager: Paul Sheerin
- Stadium: Gayfield Park
- Second Division: Fifth place
- Challenge Cup: Semi-final, lost to Queen of the South
- League Cup: Second round, lost to Inverness Caledonian Thistle
- Scottish Cup: Fourth round, lost to Celtic
- Top goalscorer: League: Steven Doris (11); All: Steven Doris (15)
- Highest home attendance: 4,127 vs Celtic; Scottish Cup; 12 December 2012
- Lowest home attendance: 387 vs Stranraer; Second Division; 21 November 2012

The 2012–13 season was Arbroath's second consecutive season in the Scottish Second Division, having been promoted from the Scottish Third Division at the end of the 2010–11 season. Arbroath also competed in the Challenge Cup, League Cup and the Scottish Cup.

== Summary ==
=== Season ===
Arbroath finished fifth in the Scottish Second Division. They reached the Semi-final of the Challenge Cup, the second round of the League Cup and the fourth round of the Scottish Cup, losing to eventual champions Celtic.

== Results & fixtures ==
Win Draw Loss Postponed

=== Preseason ===
7 July 2012 Friendly	Cove Rangers	1 – 0	Arbroath	Allan Park
14:00	Stott	Report

14 July 2012 Friendly	Arbroath	1 – 5	Aberdeen	Gayfield Park
15:00	Sibanda 89' (pen.)	Record Report	Fallon 34'; Magennis 49'; Megginson 55'; Paton 60'; Vernon 90' (pen.)	Attendance: 1,766; Referee: Somers

21 July 2012 Friendly	Arbroath	3 – 1	Keith	Gayfield Park
15:00	Sibanda; Holmes	Report	Smith	Attendance: 320; Referee: Duncan

24 July 2012 Friendly	Arbroath	1 – 0	Dundee United XI	Gayfield Park
	Rennie	Report		Attendance: 322; Referee: Charleston

=== Scottish Second Division ===
11 August 2012 Scottish Second Division	Stranraer	1 – 1	Arbroath	Stair Park
15:00	Moore 22'	SFL Report	Gribben 45'	Attendance: 290; Referee: Anderson

18 August 2012 Scottish Second Division	Arbroath	4 – 2	Ayr United	Gayfield Park
15:00	Holmes 45'; Kerr 46'; Gribben 72'; Rennie 83'	SFL Report	Sinclair 22'; Holmes 67' (Own goal)	Attendance: 714; Referee: Northcroft

25 August 2012 Scottish Second Division	Alloa Athletic	2 – 3	Arbroath	Recreation Park
15:00	Cawley 18', 32'	SFL Report	Holmes 45'; Currie 54'; Travis 63'; Rennie (red card) 64'	Attendance: 575; Referee: Salmond

1 September 2012 Scottish Second Division	Queen of the South	6 – 0	Arbroath	Palmerston Park
15:00	Gibson 17'; Clark 37'; Reilly 53', 64', 90'; Smith 87'	SFL Sport		Attendance: 1,554; Referee: McKendrick

15 September 2012 Scottish Second Division	Arbroath	2 – 0	East Fife	Gayfield Park
15:00	Doris 26'; Holmes 28'	SFL Report		Attendance: 624; Referee: Aitken

22 September 2012 Scottish Second Division	Arbroath	1 – 1	Forfar Athletic	Gayfield Park
15:00	Doris 52' (pen.)	SFL Report	Bolochoweckyj 4'; Bolochoweckyj (red card) 28'; Tulloch (red card) 62'	Attendance: 940; Referee: Roache

29 September 2012 Scottish Second Division	Stenhousemuir	2 – 2	Arbroath	Ochilview Park
15:00	Gemmell 46'; McKinlay 90'	SFL Report; SFC Report	Sibanda 61'; Currie 90'	Attendance: 633; Referee: McDermott

6 October 2012 Scottish Second Division	Arbroath	3 – 1	Brechin City	Gayfield Park
15:00	Keddie 24'; Currie 75'; Holmes 86'	SFL Report	McKenna 51'	Attendance: 854; Referee: Hilland

20 October 2012 Scottish Second Division	Albion Rovers	4 – 0	Arbroath	Cliftonhill
15:00	Crawford 16', 90'; Howarth 72'; Stevenson 77' (pen.)	SFL Report	Currie (yellow card) 90' (yellow-red card)	Attendance: 313; Referee: Cook

27 October 2012 Scottish Second Division	Ayr United	2 – 0	Arbroath	Somerset Park
15:00	MacKinnon 16'; Moffat 90'	SFL Report		Attendance: 1,062; Referee: Dallas

17 November 2012 Scottish Second Division	Arbroath	2 – 3	Queen of the South	Gayfield Park
15:00	Doris 45' (pen.), 90+2' (pen.)	SFL Report	Clark 22'; Higgins 28'; Durnan 60'	Attendance: 691; Referee: Roache

21 November 2012 Scottish Second Division	Arbroath	2 – 1	Stranraer	Gayfield Park
19:45	Currie 23'; Doris 90'	SFL Report	Love 46'	Attendance: 387; Referee: Northcroft

24 November 2012 Scottish Second Division	East Fife	2 – 1	Arbroath	Bayview Stadium
15:00	Jamieson 13'; McBride 46'	SFL Report	Currie 43'	Attendance: 570; Referee: Cook

8 December 2012 Scottish Second Division	Arbroath	2 – 2	Stenhousemuir	Gayfield Park
15:00	Doris 10'; Malcolm 51'	SFL Report	Smith 3'; Kean 90+2'	Attendance: 647; Referee: McKendrick

15 December 2012 Scottish Second Division	Forfar Athletic	1 – 1	Arbroath	Station Park
15:00	Hilson 74'	SFL Report	Holmes 90+2'	Attendance: 719; Referee: Brines

26 December 2012 Scottish Second Division	Brechin City	3 – 2	Arbroath	Glebe Park
15:00	Malcolm 8' (Own goal); McLean 35'; Trouten 61'	SFL Report	Sheerin 57'; Doris 64' (pen.)	Attendance: 978; Referee: Hilland

29 December 2012 Scottish Second Division	Arbroath	2 – 1	Albion Rovers	Gayfield Park
15:00	Holmes 19'; Doris 90+4' (pen.)	SFL Report	Donnelly 27'	Attendance: 569; Referee: Beaton

2 January 2013 Scottish Second Division	Arbroath	1 – 0	East Fife	Gayfield Park
15:00	Sheerin 53'	SFL Report	Johnstone (red card) 47'	Attendance: 813; Referee: Robertson

5 January 2013 Scottish Second Division	Queen of the South	5 – 1	Arbroath	Palmerston Park
15:00	Durnan (red card) 20'; Lyle 54'; Clark 58', 84'; Carmichael 65'; McKenna 81'	BBC Sport	Doris 18'	Attendance: 1,693; Referee: Finnie

12 January 2013 Scottish Second Division	Arbroath	P – P	Alloa Athletic	Gayfield Park
15:00		BBC Report
Note: Postponed due to waterlogged pitch

19 January 2013 Scottish Second Division	Stranraer	P – P	Arbroath	Stair Park
15:00		BBC Report
Note: Postponed due to frozen pitch

26 January 2013 Scottish Second Division	Arbroath	3 – 1	Forfar Athletic	Gayfield Park
15:00	Sibanda 8'; Bayne 17', 56'	SFL Report	Campbell 72' (pen.); Robertson (red card) 79'	Attendance: 843; Referee: Somers

2 February 2013 Scottish Second Division	Stenhousemuir	1 – 0	Arbroath	Ochilview Park
15:00	Gemmell 45'	SFL Sport		Attendance: 459; Referee: Anderson

9 February 2013 Scottish Second Division	Albion Rovers	0 – 1	Arbroath	Cliftonhill Stadium
15:00		SFL Report	Hamilton 35'	Attendance: 346; Referee: Norris

16 February 2013 Scottish Second Division	Arbroath	0 – 1	Brechin City	Gayfield Park
15:00		SFL Report; Brechin Report	Trouten 87'	Attendance: 904; Referee: Finnie

19 February 2013 Scottish Second Division	Stranraer	2 – 0	Arbroath	Stair Park
19:45	Morrison 21' (Own goal); Love 58'	SFL Report		Attendance: 169; Referee: Aitken

23 February 2013 Scottish Second Division	Alloa Athletic	0 – 1	Arbroath	Recreation Park
15:00		SFL Report	Holmes 41'	Attendance: 451; Referee: Finnie

27 February 2013 Scottish Second Division	Arbroath	1 – 2	Alloa Athletic	Gayfield Park
19:45	Malcolm 64'	SFL Report	McCord 19' (pen.); Cawley 89'	Attendance: 471; Referee: Somers

2 March 2013 Scottish Second Division	Arbroath	1 – 4	Ayr United	Gayfield Park
15:00	Homes 2'; Kerr (yellow card) 54' (yellow-red card)	SFL Report	Moffat 41' (pen.), 43', 72' (pen.), 75'	Attendance: 651; Referee: Dallas

9 March 2013 Scottish Second Division	East Fife	0 – 1	Arbroath	Bayview Stadium
15:00		SFL Report	Bayne 85'	Attendance: 426; Referee: Cook

16 March 2013 Scottish Second Division	Arbroath	1 – 1	Queen of the South	Gayfield Park
15:00	Smith 83'	SFL Report	Clark 90'	Attendance: 656; Referee: Tumilty

23 March 2013 Scottish Second Division	Arbroath	P – P	Stenhousemuir	Gayfield Park
15:00		BBC Report
Note: Postponed due to high winds

30 March 2013 Scottish Second Division	Forfar Athletic	2 – 4	Arbroath	Station Park
15:00	Denholm 30'; Templeman 77'	SFL Report	Doris 7'; Hamilton 56'; Travis 73'; Sheerin 89'	Attendance: 770; Referee: Anderson

3 April 2013 Scottish Second Division	Arbroath	0 – 0	Stenhousemuir	Gayfield Park
19:45		Report		Attendance: 532; Referee: McKendrick

6 April 2013 Scottish Second Division	Arbroath	2 – 1	Albion Rovers	Gayfield Park
15:00	Doris 83' (pen.); Keddie 89'	SFL Report	Walker 55'; Russell (red card) 82'	Attendance: 555; Referee: Madden

20 April 2013 Scottish Second Division	Arbroath	1 – 0	Stranraer	Gayfield Park
15:00	Sheerin 25'	SFL Report		Attendance: 562; Referee: Cook

27 April 2013 Scottish Second Division	Ayr United	0 – 1	Arbroath	Somerset Park
15:00		SFL Report	Smith 60'	Attendance: 834; Referee: Aitken

4 May 2013 Scottish Second Division	Arbroath	0 – 1	Alloa Athletic	Gayfield Park
15:00		SFL Report	Hynd 89'	Attendance: 901; Referee: Robertson

=== Scottish Challenge Cup ===
28 July 2012 Scottish Challenge Cup round 1	Elgin City	5 – 7	Arbroath	Borough Briggs
15:00	Gunn 19'; Leslie 50', 89'; Moore 52'; Wyness 87'	SFL Report	Sibanda 16', 27', 43'; Doris 21'; Gribben 45', 66', 71' (pen.)	Attendance: 561; Referee: Colvin

14 August 2012 Scottish Challenge Cup round 2	Arbroath	3 – 2	Forfar Athletic	Gayfield Park
	Currie 22'; Gribben 35', 38'	SFL Report	Swankie 30'; Gibson 44'; Campbell (yellow card) 62' (red card)	Attendance: 732; Referee: Charleston

9 September 2012 Scottish Challenge Cup QF	Arbroath	1 – 0	Stenhousemuir	Gayfield Park
15:00	Robertson 34'	SFL Report	Gemmell (red card) 49'	Attendance: 623; Referee: Colvin

14 October 2012 Scottish Challenge Cup SF	Queen of the South	2 – 1 (a.e.t.)	Arbroath	Palmerston Park
15:00	Young 9'; McGuffie 117'	SFL Report	Keddie 58'	Attendance: 2,310; Referee: Clancy

=== Scottish League Cup ===
4 August 2012 Scottish League Cup round 1	Arbroath	1 – 1 (a.e.t.) (3 – 2 p)	Stirling Albion	Gayfield Park
15:00	Currie 83'	SFL Report	Ferry 42' (pen.)	Attendance: 579; Referee: Robertson
	Penalties
	Doris (penalty scored); Holmes (penalty scored); Sheerin (penalty missed); Currie (penalty scored)		Weir (penalty missed); Davidson (penalty scored); McSorley (penalty scored); Ferry (penalty missed); Ashe (penalty missed)

29 August 2012 Scottish League Cup round 2	Arbroath	0 – 2	Inverness Caledonian Thistle	Gayfield Park
19:45		BBC Report	Shinnie 7', 71'	Attendance: 672; Referee: Finnie

=== Scottish Cup ===
3 November 2012 Scottish Cup round 3	Inverurie Loco Works	3 – 3	Arbroath	Harlaw Park
15:00	Bain 67'; Gauld 86', 90'	BBC Report	Doris 5' (pen.); Currie 23'; Gribben 58'	Attendance: 732; Referee: Aitken

10 November 2012 Scottish Cup round 3 replay	Arbroath	3 – 1	Inverurie Loco Works	Gayfield Park
15:00	Kerr 36'; Holmes 38'; Doris 47'	BBC Report	McLean (red card) 74'; Gauld 90'	Attendance: 1,108; Referee: Aitken

1 December 2012 Scottish Cup round 4	Celtic	1 – 1	Arbroath	Celtic Park
15:00	Keddie 36' (o.g.)	BBC Report	Doris 87'	Attendance: 15,000; Referee: Charleston

12 December 2012 Scottish Cup round 4 replay	Arbroath	0 – 1	Celtic	Gayfield Park
19:45		BBC Report	Matthews 18'	Attendance: 4,127; Referee: Charleston

== Player statistics ==
=== Squad ===
Last updated 11 May 2013

No.	Pos	Nat	Player	Total		Second Division		Challenge Cup		League Cup		Scottish Cup	
No.	Pos	Nat	Player	Apps	Goals	Apps	Goals	Apps	Goals	Apps	Goals	Apps	Goals
	GK	(England) ENG	Tony Bullock	11	0	9+1	0	0+0	0	1+0	0	0+0	0
	GK	(Scotland) SCO	Darren Hill	8	0	5+0	0	2+0	0	1+0	0	0+0	0
	GK	(Scotland) SCO	Scott Morrison	28	0	22+0	0	2+0	0	0+0	0	4+0	0
	DF	(Scotland) SCO	Scott Adams	2	0	1+1	0	0+0	0	0+0	0	0+0	0
	DF	(Scotland) SCO	Mark Baxter	41	0	31+0	0	4+0	0	2+0	0	4+0	0
	DF	(Scotland) SCO	Kieron Brennan	6	0	2+0	0	2+0	0	1+0	0	1+0	0
	DF	(Scotland) SCO	Colin Hamilton	38	2	32+0	2	2+0	0	1+0	0	3+0	0
	DF	(Scotland) SCO	Alex Keddie	46	3	36+0	2	4+0	1	2+0	0	4+0	0
	DF	(Scotland) SCO	Stuart Malcolm	27	2	16+5	2	2+0	0	0+1	0	3+0	0
	DF	(South Africa) RSA	Michael Travis	23	2	19+0	2	1+1	0	1+1	0	0+0	0
	MF	(England) ENG	David Banjo	14	0	5+5	0	0+1	0	1+1	0	0+1	0
	MF	(Scotland) SCO	Connor Birse	11	0	3+5	0	0+1	0	0+0	0	0+2	0
	MF	(Scotland) SCO	Ross Chisholm	17	0	17+0	0	0+0	0	0+0	0	0+0	0
	MF	(Scotland) SCO	Paul Currie	27	8	12+6	5	3+0	1	2+0	1	4+0	1
	MF	(Scotland) SCO	Brian Kerr	38	2	28+1	1	4+0	0	1+0	0	4+0	1
	MF	(Scotland) SCO	Scott Robertson	34	1	24+2	0	3+0	1	1+0	0	3+1	0
	MF	(Scotland) SCO	Paul Sheerin	41	4	30+2	4	2+1	0	2+0	0	4+0	0
	MF	(Scotland) SCO	Patrick Smith	1	0	0+1	0	0+0	0	0+0	0	0+0	0
	MF	(Scotland) SCO	Marcus Watt	1	0	1+0	0	0+0	0	0+0	0	0+0	0
	MF	(England) ENG	Joe Prince-Wright	0	0	0+0	0	0+0	0	0+0	0	0+0	0
	FW	(Scotland) SCO	Graham Bayne	16	3	10+6	3	0+0	0	0+0	0	0+0	0
	FW	(Scotland) SCO	Steven Doris	42	15	32+0	11	3+1	1	2+0	0	4+0	3
	FW	(Scotland) SCO	Jordan Elfverson	0	0	0+0	0	0+0	0	0+0	0	0+0	0
	FW	(Scotland) SCO	Darren Gribben	26	8	10+7	2	2+2	5	2+0	0	2+1	1
	FW	(Scotland) SCO	Derek Holmes	41	9	19+12	8	2+2	0	1+1	0	3+1	1
	MF	(Scotland) SCO	Jake Mair	4	0	1+2	0	1+0	0	0+0	0	0+0	0
	FW	(Scotland) SCO	Danny Rennie	33	1	7+17	1	3+1	0	0+1	0	0+4	0
	FW	(Scotland) SCO	Dayle Robertson	1	0	0+1	0	0+0	0	0+0	0	0+0	0
	FW	(Scotland) SCO	Lee Sibanda	37	5	17+11	2	2+2	3	1+1	0	1+2	0
	FW	(Scotland) SCO	Euan Smith	14	2	9+5	2	0+0	0	0+0	0	0+0	0

=== Disciplinary record ===
Includes all competitive matches.

Last updated 11 May 2013

Nation	Position	Name	Second Division		Challenge Cup		League Cup		Scottish Cup		Total	
Nation	Position	Name	Yellow card	Red card	Yellow card	Red card	Yellow card	Red card	Yellow card	Red card	Yellow card	Red card
(England)	GK	Tony Bullock	1	0	0	0	0	0	0	0	1	0
(Scotland)	GK	Darren Hill	0	0	0	0	0	0	0	0	0	0
(Scotland)	GK	Scott Morrison	0	0	0	0	0	0	0	0	0	0
(Scotland)	DF	Scott Adams	1	0	0	0	0	0	0	0	1	0
(Scotland)	DF	Mark Baxter	4	0	1	0	1	0	0	0	6	0
(Scotland)	DF	Kieron Brennan	0	0	0	0	0	0	0	0	0	0
(Scotland)	DF	Colin Hamilton	6	0	2	0	1	0	0	0	9	0
(Scotland)	DF	Alex Keddie	2	0	2	0	0	0	0	0	4	0
(Scotland)	DF	Stuart Malcolm	5	0	1	0	0	0	1	0	7	0
(South Africa)	DF	Michael Travis	5	0	0	0	1	0	0	0	6	0
(England)	MF	David Banjo	1	0	0	0	0	0	0	0	1	0
(Scotland)	MF	Connor Birse	0	0	0	0	0	0	0	0	0	0
(Scotland)	MF	Ross Chisholm	3	0	0	0	0	0	0	0	3	0
(Scotland)	MF	Paul Currie	4	1	1	0	1	0	0	0	6	1
(Scotland)	MF	Brian Kerr	7	1	0	0	0	0	1	0	8	1
(Scotland)	MF	Scott Robertson	6	0	1	0	0	0	2	0	9	0
(Scotland)	MF	Paul Sheerin	2	0	0	0	0	0	0	0	2	0
(Scotland)	MF	Patrick Smith	0	0	0	0	0	0	0	0	0	0
(Scotland)	MF	Marcus Watt	0	0	0	0	0	0	0	0	0	0
(England)	MF	Joe Prince-Wright	0	0	0	0	0	0	0	0	0	0
(Scotland)	FW	Graham Bayne	5	0	0	0	0	0	0	0	5	0
(Scotland)	FW	Steven Doris	2	0	0	0	0	0	0	0	2	0
(Scotland)	FW	Jordan Elfverson	0	0	0	0	0	0	0	0	0	0
(Scotland)	FW	Darren Gribben	0	0	0	0	0	0	1	0	1	0
(Scotland)	FW	Derek Holmes	0	0	0	0	0	0	0	0	0	0
(Scotland)	FW	Jake Mair	0	0	1	0	0	0	0	0	1	0
(Scotland)	FW	Danny Rennie	1	1	0	0	0	0	0	0	1	1
(Scotland)	FW	Dayle Robertson	0	0	0	0	0	0	0	0	0	0
(Scotland)	FW	Lee Sibanda	3	0	1	0	0	0	0	0	4	0
(Scotland)	FW	Euan Smith	2	0	0	0	0	0	0	0	2	0

== Team statistics ==
=== League table ===
Pos	Team	Pld	W	D	L	GF	GA	GD	Pts	Promotion, qualification or relegation
3	Brechin City	36	19	4	13	72	59	+13	61	Qualification for the First Division play-offs
4	Forfar Athletic	36	17	3	16	67	74	−7	54	Qualification for the First Division play-offs
5	Arbroath	36	15	7	14	47	57	−10	52	
6	Stenhousemuir	36	12	13	11	59	59	0	49	
7	Ayr United	36	12	5	19	53	65	−12	41	

Source: SPFL Archive
Rules for classification: 1) points; 2) goal difference; 3) number of goals scored.

=== Division summary ===
Round	1	2	3	4	5	6	7	8	9	10	11	12	13	14	15	16	17	18	19	20	21	22	23	24	25	26	27	28	29	30	31	32	33	34	35	36
Ground	A	H	A	A	H	H	A	H	A	A	H	H	A	H	A	A	H	H	A	H	A	A	H	A	A	H	H	A	H	A	H	H	A	H	A	H
Result	D	W	W	L	W	D	D	W	L	L	L	W	L	D	D	L	W	W	L	W	L	W	L	L	W	L	L	W	D	W	D	W	L	W	W	L
Position	4	2	1	4	3	3	3	3	4	4	6	4	5	5	4	6	5	5	5	4	4	4	4	5	4	5	5	5	5	4	4	4	5	4	4	5

Updated to match(es) played on 11 May 2013. Source:
A = Away; H = Home; W = Win; D = Draw; L = Loss

== Transfers ==
=== Players in ===
Player	To	Fee
(England) Tony Bullock	Unattached	Free
(Scotland) Paul Currie	(Scotland) Musselburgh Athletic	Free
(Scotland) Danny Rennie	(Scotland) Civil Service Strollers	Free
(Scotland) Derek Holmes	(Scotland) Airdrie United	Free
(South Africa) Michael Travis	(Scotland) Livingston	Free
(Scotland) Alex Keddie	(Scotland) Dunfermline Athletic	Free
(Scotland) Darren Gribben	(Scotland) Berwick Rangers	Free
(Scotland) Kieron Brennan	(Slovakia) Spartak Trnava	Free
(England) Joe Prince-Wright	(United States) Barnstonworth Rovers	Free
(Scotland) Scott Robertson	(Scotland) Partick Thistle	Free
(England) David Banjo	(England) Ilford	Free
(Scotland) Colin Hamilton	(Scotland) Heart of Midlothian	Free
(Scotland) Ross Chisholm	(Bulgaria) Shumen 2010	Free
(Scotland) Euan Smith	(Scotland) Hibernian	Loan

=== Players out ===
Player	To	Fee
(Scotland) Chris Innes	Free agent	Free
(Scotland) Kieran McAnespie	(Scotland) Stirling Albion	Free
(Scotland) Keith Gibson	(Scotland) Forfar Athletic	Free
(Trinidad and Tobago) Collin Samuel	(Scotland) East Fife	Free
(Scotland) Michael White	(Scotland) Petershill	Free
(Scotland) Kevin Brown	(Scotland) Crossgates Primrose	Free
(Scotland) Craig Wedderburn	(Scotland) Clyde	Free
(Australia) Beau Busch	Free agent	Free
(Scotland) Gavin Swankie	(Scotland) Forfar Athletic	Free
(Scotland) Darryl Burns	(Scotland) Broughty Athletic	Free
(England) Josh Falkingham	(Scotland) Dunfermline Athletic	Undisclosed
(Scotland) Graham Girvan	(Scotland) Petershill	Free
(South Africa) Michael Travis	(Scotland) Musselburgh Athletic	Loan
(Scotland) Darren Hill	(Scotland) Forfar Athletic	Free
(Scotland) Darren Gribben	(Scotland) Stranraer	Free
(England) Joe Prince-Wright	(Scotland) Bo'ness United	Free
