= Euan Smith =

Scottish footballer

Personal information
- Date of birth: 29 January 1994 (age 32)
- Height: 6 ft 2 in (1.88 m)
- Position: Midfielder

Team information
- Current team: Spartans

Youth career
- Hibernian

Senior career*
Years	Team	Apps	(Gls)
2012–2014	Hibernian	0	(0)
2013	→ Arbroath (loan)	14	(2)
2014–2015	Kilmarnock	0	(0)
2014–2015	→ Clyde (loan)	15	(2)
2015–2019	Brechin City	95	(3)
2019–2021	Berwick Rangers		
2021–	Spartans		
- * Club domestic league appearances and goals as of 11:00, 17 May 2021 (UTC)

Euan Smith (born 29 January 1994) is a Scottish semi-professional footballer who plays for as a midfielder for Spartans.

== Career ==
After playing for Hibernian, and spending time on loan at Arbroath, Smith signed for Kilmarnock in August 2014. He spent time on loan at Clyde and also played for Brechin City, before signing for Berwick Rangers in June 2019. Smith signed a precontract with Spartans on 26 April 2021.

== Career statistics ==
As of match played 21 June 2018

Appearances and goals by club, season and competition
Club	Season	League			Scottish Cup		League Cup		Other		Total	
Club	Season	Division	Apps	Goals	Apps	Goals	Apps	Goals	Apps	Goals	Apps	Goals
Arbroath (loan)	2012–13	Second Division	14	2	0	0	0	0	0	0	14	2
Clyde (loan)	2014–15	League Two	15	2	2	0	0	0	0	0	17	2
Brechin City	2015–16	League One	23	0	1	0	1	0	1 (Note: Appearances in the Scottish Challenge Cup)	0	26	0
Brechin City	2016–17	League One	18	0	1	0	3	0	2	0	24	0
Brechin City	2017–18	Championship	22	0	2	0	1	0	0	0	25	0
Brechin City	2018–19	League One	32	3	1	0	3	0	1	0	37	3
Brechin total			95	3	5	0	8	0	4	0	112	3
Career total			124	7	7	0	8	0	4	0	143	7
