= James Dale (footballer) =

English footballer

Personal information
- Full name: James William Dale
- Date of birth: 13 October 1993 (age 33)
- Place of birth: Reading, England
- Position: Midfielder

Youth career
- –1999: Wokingham Town
- 1999–2007: Reading
- Wycombe Wanderers
- 2010–2012: Bristol Rovers

Senior career*
Years	Team	Apps	(Gls)
2012–2013	Stirling University		
2013–2015	Forfar Athletic	55	(3)
2015–2018	Brechin City	85	(2)
2018	Njarðvíkur	10	(0)
2019–2021	Víkingur	53	(0)
2022	Þróttur Vogum	18	(0)
- * Club domestic league appearances and goals as of 11:11, 22 May 2023 (UTC)

James William Dale (born 13 October 1993) is an English professional footballer who plays as a midfielder.

== Early life ==
Dale was born in Hammersmith, London and attended Bearwood College in Berkshire.

== Career ==
Dale began his footballing career at Reading, playing for the club from the age of 5. He left the club to Join League One club Bristol Rovers. In his youth career, he represented their XI team a number of times.

Dale signed for Forfar Athletic in the 2012 summer transfer window and made his debut on 3 August 2012.

Dale helped Forfar Athletic beat Rangers 2–1 in the Scottish League Cup at Station Park. This was Forfar's first-ever victory against Rangers.

In 2015 Dale signed with Scottish League One side Brechin City. In his first successful year at the club he was announced as the club's player's player of the year. In Dale's second year at the Brechin City, he clinched promotion to the Scottish Championship, by scoring in the playoff final, then sealing himself in the club's history by successfully converting the crucial penalty Dale decided to part with Brechin City after the 2017–18 season.

On 23 July 2018, Dale joined Icelandic 1. deild karla side Njarðvíkur.

In May 2019, Dale moved to fellow 1. deild karla side Víkingur, making his debut on 17 May 2019, playing the final few minutes in a 2–1 win over Þróttur.

In February 2022, Dale joined Þróttur Vogum on a free transfer.

== Career statistics ==
As of match played 3 August 2018

Appearances and goals by club, season and competition
Club	Season	League			Scottish Cup		League Cup		Other		Total	
Club	Season	Division	Apps	Goals	Apps	Goals	Apps	Goals	Apps	Goals	Apps	Goals
Stirling University	2012–13	Lowland Football League	–		1	0	0	0	0	0	1	0
Forfar Athletic	2013–14	Scottish League One	29	2	2	0	2	0	1 (Note: Appearances in the Scottish Challenge Cup)	0	34	2
Forfar Athletic	2014–15	Scottish League One	26	1	1	0	1	0	3 (Note: One appearance in the Scottish Challenge Cup and two in the Championship play-offs)	0	31	1
Forfar Athletic	Total		55	3	3	0	3	0	4	0	65	3
Brechin City	2015–16	Scottish League One	24	0	1	0	1	0	1	0	27	0
Brechin City	2016–17	Scottish League One	29	0	0	0	3	0	6 (Note: Two appearances in the Scottish Challenge Cup, four appearances and one goal in the Championship play-offs)	1	38	1
Brechin City	2017–18	Scottish Championship	32	0	2	0	3	0	1	0	38	0
Brechin City	Total		85	0	3	0	7	0	8	1	103	1
Njarðvíkur	2018	1. deild karla	2	0	0	0	0	0	0	0	2	0
Career total			142	3	7	0	10	0	12	1	170	5
