= Stevie Findlay =

Scottish football manager

Personal information
- Full name: Stevie Findlay
- Place of birth: Scotland

Managerial career
- Years: Team
- 2016-2017: Fauldhouse United
- 2017–2018: Airdrieonians

Stevie Findlay is a Scottish football manager who was first-team coach of Airdrieonians.

== Airdrieonians ==
Following coaching experience of the under-20s at the club, Findlay was appointed First-Team Coach of Scottish League One side Airdrieonians on 29 September 2017.

=== Managerial Statistics ===
As of match played 6 October 2018

Team	From	To	Record				
Team	From	To	G	W	D	L	Win %
Airdrieonians	29 September 2017	8 October 2018	45	14	12	19	31.11
