= 2017–18 Scottish League One =

Scottish League One
- Season: 2017–18
- Champions: Ayr United
- Promoted: Ayr United; Alloa Athletic
- Relegated: Queen's Park; Albion Rovers
- Matches: 180
- Goals: 578 (3.21 per match)
- Top goalscorer: Lawrence Shankland (26 goals)
- Biggest home win: Arbroath 7–1 Airdrieonians (21 October 2017)
- Biggest away win: East Fife 0–5 Raith Rovers (26 August 2017); Forfar Athletic 0–5 Arbroath (16 September 2017); Queen's Park 0–5 Raith Rovers (16 September 2017); Forfar Athletic 0–5 Ayr United (21 October 2017); East Fife 0–5 Arbroath (14 April 2018)
- Highest scoring: East Fife 5–4 Albion Rovers (14 October 2017)
- Longest winning run: 8 matches: Ayr United
- Longest unbeaten run: 12 matches: Ayr United
- Longest winless run: 10 matches: Forfar Athletic
- Longest losing run: 7 matches: Albion Rovers
- Highest attendance: 4,496; Raith Rovers 0–0 Alloa Athletic (28 April 2018)
- Lowest attendance: 167; Albion Rovers 1–2 Arbroath (27 March 2018)
- Total attendance: 149,668
- Average attendance: 831 ( 266)
- All statistics correct as of 28 April 2018.

The 2017–18 Scottish League One (known as Ladbrokes League One for sponsorship reasons) was the 24th season in the format of 10 teams in the third-tier of Scottish football. The fixtures were published on 23 June 2017.

Ten teams contested the league: Airdrieonians, Albion Rovers, Alloa Athletic, Arbroath, Ayr United, East Fife, Forfar Athletic, Queen's Park, Raith Rovers and Stranraer.

== Prize money ==
In April 2018, the SPFL confirmed the prize money to be allocated to the league members at the conclusion of the competitions. The League One winners would receive £119,000 with a total pot of £24.5 million to be distributed across the four divisions.

== Teams ==
The following teams changed division prior to the 2016–17 season.

=== To League One ===
Promoted from Scottish League Two

- Arbroath
- Forfar Athletic

Relegated from Scottish Championship

- Ayr United
- Raith Rovers

=== From League One ===
Relegated to Scottish League Two

- Peterhead
- Stenhousemuir

Promoted to Scottish Championship

- Brechin City
- Livingston

=== Stadia and locations ===
Airdrieonians	Albion Rovers	Alloa Athletic	Arbroath
Excelsior Stadium	Cliftonhill	Recreation Park	Gayfield Park
Capacity: 10,101	Capacity: 1,238	Capacity: 3,100	Capacity: 6,600
Ayr United	2017–18 Scottish League One is located in Scotland South		East Fife
Somerset Park	2017–18 Scottish League One is located in Scotland South		Bayview Stadium
Capacity: 10,185	2017–18 Scottish League One is located in Scotland South		Capacity: 1,980
Forfar Athletic	Queen's Park	Raith Rovers	Stranraer
Station Park	Hampden Park	Stark's Park	Stair Park
Capacity: 6,777	Capacity: 51,866	Capacity: 8,867	Capacity: 4,178

=== Personnel and kits ===
Team	Manager	Captain	Kit manufacturer	Shirt sponsor
Airdrieonians	(Scotland) Stevie Findlay	(Scotland) Marc Fitzpatrick	Under Armour	Holemasters
Albion Rovers	(Scotland) Brian Kerr	(Scotland) Gary Fisher	Adidas	Reigart Demolition
Alloa Athletic	(Republic of Ireland) Jim Goodwin	(Scotland) Andy Graham	Pendle	The Energy Check
Arbroath	(Scotland) Dick Campbell	(Scotland) Mark Whatley	Pendle	Megatech
Ayr United	(Scotland) Ian McCall	(Scotland) Ross Docherty	Adidas	Bodog
East Fife	(Scotland) Darren Young	(Scotland) Kevin Smith	Joma	W Glendinning Haulage Contractors (Home); EF Joinery (Away)
Forfar Athletic	(Scotland) Jim Weir	(South Africa) Michael Travis	Pendle	Orchard Timber Products
Queen's Park	(Scotland) Gus MacPherson	(Scotland) Sean Burns	Under Armour	Irn-Bru
Raith Rovers	(Scotland) Barry Smith	(Scotland) Kyle Benedictus	Puma	valmcdermid.com (Home); Tag Games (Away)
Stranraer	(Scotland) Stephen Farrell	(Scotland) Scott Robertson	Stanno	Stena Line

=== Managerial changes ===
Team	Outgoing manager	Manner of departure	Date of vacancy	Position in table	Incoming manager	Date of appointment
Albion Rovers	(Scotland) Darren Young	Contract expired	6 May 2017	Pre-season	(Scotland) Brian Kerr	8 May 2017
Raith Rovers	(Scotland) John Hughes	Resigned	13 May 2017	Pre-season	(Scotland) Barry Smith	29 May 2017
East Fife	(Scotland) Barry Smith	Signed by Raith Rovers	29 May 2017	Pre-season	(Scotland) Darren Young	3 June 2017
Airdrieonians	(Scotland) Mark Wilson	Resigned	17 June 2017	Pre-season	(Scotland) Willie Aitchison	4 August 2017
Airdrieonians	(Scotland) Willie Aitchison	Sacked	19 August 2017	5th	(Scotland) Stevie Findlay	29 September 2017
Forfar Athletic	(Scotland) Gary Bollan	Sacked	18 September 2017	10th	(Scotland) Stuart Balmer (Scotland) Barry Sellars (joint-interims)	18 September 2017
Forfar Athletic	(Scotland) Stuart Balmer (Scotland) Barry Sellars (joint-interims)	Interim ended	1 October 2017	10th	(Scotland) Jim Weir	1 October 2017

== League Summary ==
=== League table ===
Pos	Team	Pld	W	D	L	GF	GA	GD	Pts	Promotion, qualification or relegation
1	Ayr United (C, P)	36	24	4	8	92	42	+50	76	Promotion to the Championship
2	Raith Rovers	36	22	9	5	68	32	+36	75	Qualification for the Championship play-offs
3	Alloa Athletic (O, P)	36	17	9	10	56	43	+13	60	Qualification for the Championship play-offs
4	Arbroath	36	17	8	11	70	51	+19	59	Qualification for the Championship play-offs
5	Stranraer	36	16	5	15	58	66	−8	53	
6	East Fife	36	13	3	20	49	67	−18	42	
7	Airdrieonians	36	10	11	15	46	60	−14	41	
8	Forfar Athletic	36	11	5	20	40	65	−25	38	
9	Queen's Park (R)	36	7	10	19	42	72	−30	31	Qualification for the League One play-offs
10	Albion Rovers (R)	36	8	6	22	57	80	−23	30	Relegation to League Two

Source: SPFL
Rules for classification: 1) Points; 2) Goal difference; 3) Number of goals scored
(C) Champions; (O) Play-off winners; (P) Promoted; (R) Relegated

=== Positions by Round ===
The table lists the positions of teams after each week of matches. In order to preserve chronological progress, any postponed matches are not included in the round at which they were originally scheduled, but added to the full round they were played immediately afterwards. For example, if a match is scheduled for matchday 13, but then postponed and played between days 16 and 17, it will be added to the standings for day 16.

Leader - Promotion to 2018–19 Scottish Championship
Qualification to Championship play-offs
Qualification to League One play-offs
Relegation to 2018–19 Scottish League Two

Team \ Round	1	2	3	4	5	6	7	8	9	10	11	12	13	14	15	16	17	18	19	20	21	22	23	24	25	26	27	28	29	30	31	32	33	34	35	36
Ayr United	1	1	1	2	2	2	3	2	2	2	2	1	1	1	1	1	1	1	1	1	2	2	1	2	2	2	2	2	1	1	1	1	1	1	2	1
Raith Rovers	6	2	2	1	1	1	1	1	1	1	1	2	2	2	2	2	2	2	2	2	1	1	2	1	1	1	1	1	2	2	2	2	2	2	1	2
Alloa Athletic	5	9	6	7	6	7	7	8	8	7	6	3	3	4	4	3	4	3	3	3	3	5	5	4	3	4	4	4	4	4	4	3	4	4	4	3
Arbroath	2	3	4	3	6	3	2	4	5	3	4	5	4	3	3	4	5	5	5	4	4	3	4	3	4	3	3	3	3	3	3	4	3	3	3	4
Stranraer	4	7	8	8	5	4	6	6	6	6	7	6	6	6	6	6	3	4	4	5	5	4	3	5	5	5	5	5	6	6	5	5	5	5	5	5
East Fife	8	4	3	6	7	6	5	5	4	5	3	4	5	5	5	5	6	7	7	7	7	6	6	6	6	7	6	6	5	5	6	6	6	6	6	6
Airdrieonians	7	8	5	4	4	8	8	7	7	8	8	8	8	8	7	7	7	6	6	6	6	7	7	7	7	6	7	7	7	7	7	7	7	7	7	7
Forfar Athletic	3	6	9	9	10	10	10	10	10	10	10	9	9	9	9	9	9	10	10	10	10	10	9	9	10	8	8	9	8	8	8	8	8	8	8	8
Queen's Park	9	10	10	10	9	9	9	9	9	9	9	10	10	10	10	10	10	9	9	9	9	9	10	10	9	10	10	10	10	10	10	10	10	10	10	9
Albion Rovers	10	5	7	5	3	5	4	3	3	4	5	7	7	7	8	8	8	8	8	8	8	8	8	8	8	9	9	8	9	9	9	9	9	9	9	10

Updated: 28 April 2018

== Results ==
Teams play each other four times, twice in the first half of the season (home and away) and twice in the second half of the season (home and away), making a total of 36 games.

=== First half of season ===
Home \ Away	AIR	ALB	ALL	ARB	AYR	EFI	FOR	QPA	RAI	STR
Airdrieonians	—	2–2	2–0	1–1	2–0	0–1	2–1	4–2	2–2	2–0
Albion Rovers	1–2	—	0–2	1–2	1–5	3–2	3–4	0–1	2–1	0–4
Alloa Athletic	1–0	2–5	—	5–3	1–2	4–1	2–1	1–0	1–1	1–0
Arbroath	7–1	1–4	1–1	—	1–4	2–3	2–1	2–0	1–2	1–2
Ayr United	2–2	3–2	3–3	1–2	—	3–0	3–0	3–2	3–0	2–0
East Fife	6–1	5–4	1–0	3–1	1–4	—	3–0	0–1	0–5	1–1
Forfar Athletic	2–1	0–2	0–2	0–5	0–5	2–0	—	0–3	1–1	1–1
Queen's Park	1–1	2–5	0–4	0–2	0–2	2–1	1–1	—	0–5	2–2
Raith Rovers	2–0	3–1	2–1	2–0	2–1	1–0	3–1	2–0	—	3–0
Stranraer	3–1	2–2	2–0	2–6	3–4	1–0	3–0	3–0	1–0	—

Source: Scottish League One
Legend: Blue = home team win; Yellow = draw; Red = away team win.

=== Second half of season ===
Home \ Away	AIR	ALB	ALL	ARB	AYR	EFI	FOR	QPA	RAI	STR
Airdrieonians	—	2–0	2–2	0–0	1–2	0–0	1–2	2–1	1–2	2–1
Albion Rovers	2–2	—	1–3	1–2	2–3	1–0	0–1	1–1	2–2	1–3
Alloa Athletic	2–2	3–1	—	3–2	2–1	1–2	1–0	2–2	0–0	0–1
Arbroath	2–0	1–0	0–0	—	1–1	1–1	2–0	2–1	1–1	2–3
Ayr United	3–0	2–0	1–2	1–2	—	3–0	2–3	4–0	3–0	1–2
East Fife	2–1	2–0	2–1	0–5	2–3	—	1–2	0–2	2–3	2–3
Forfar Athletic	0–1	4–2	0–1	0–1	0–2	2–0	—	1–1	2–1	5–1
Queen's Park	0–0	2–2	1–2	3–0	1–4	2–3	2–2	—	1–3	2–2
Raith Rovers	2–1	2–0	0–0	2–2	1–1	2–0	2–1	2–0	—	3–0
Stranraer	3–2	2–3	1–0	1–4	1–5	0–2	2–0	2–3	0–3	—

Source: Scottish League One
Legend: Blue = home team win; Yellow = draw; Red = away team win.

== Season statistics ==
=== Scoring ===
==== Top scorers ====
As of matches played on 28 April 2018

Rank	Player	Club	Goals
1	(Scotland) Lawrence Shankland	Ayr United	26
2	(Scotland) Alan Trouten	Albion Rovers	20
3	(Scotland) Craig Moore	Ayr United	19
4	(Scotland) Ryan Wallace	Stranraer/Arbroath	16
5	(Scotland) Lewis Vaughan	Raith Rovers	15
6	(Australia) Chris Duggan	East Fife	14
7	(Scotland) Michael Moffat	Ayr United	11
7	(Scotland) Greig Spence	Raith Rovers	11
9	(Scotland) Danny Denholm	Arbroath	10
9	(Scotland) Liam Buchanan	Raith Rovers	10
9	(Scotland) Scott Agnew	Stranraer	10

==== Hat-tricks ====
Player	For	Against	Result	Date	Ref
(Scotland) Craig Moore	Ayr United	Albion Rovers	5–1	6 August 2017	
(Scotland) Ryan McCord	Arbroath	Stranraer	6–2	23 September 2017	
(Scotland) Michael Moffat	Ayr United	Forfar Athletic	5–0	21 October 2017	
(Scotland) Ross C. Stewart	Alloa Athletic	Arbroath	5–3	6 March 2018	
(Scotland) Lawrence Shankland	Ayr United	Queen's Park	4–0	24 March 2018	

=== Discipline ===
==== Player ====
===== Yellow cards =====
As of matches played on 28 April 2018

Rank	Player	Club	Cards
1	(Scotland) Iain Davidson	Raith Rovers	12
2	(Scotland) Sean Burns	Queen's Park	11
3	(Scotland) Ross Davidson	Albion Rovers	10
3	(Scotland) Mark Millar	Forfar Athletic	10
3	(Scotland) Gregor Fotheringham	Queen's Park	10
6	(Scotland) Aaron Dunsmore	East Fife	9

===== Red cards =====
As of matches played on 28 April 2018

Rank	Player	Club	Cards
1	(Scotland) Luke Watt	Airdrieonians	2
1	(Scotland) Jason Marr	Albion Rovers	2
1	(Scotland) Eddie Malone	Forfar Athletic	2
1	(Scotland) Andy Munro	Forfar Athletic	2
1	(Scotland) Scott Robertson	Stranraer	2
6	24 players		1

==== Club ====
===== Yellow cards =====
As of matches played on 28 April 2018

Rank	Club	Cards
1	Queen's Park	72
2	Forfar Athletic	71
3	Albion Rovers	61

===== Red cards =====
As of matches played on 28 April 2018

Rank	Club	Cards
1	Forfar Athletic	7
2	Airdrieonians	6
2	Albion Rovers	6

=== Attendances ===
Pos	Team	Total	High	Low	Average	Change
1	Raith Rovers	33,954	4,496	1,260	1,886	−28.3%
2	Ayr United	28,596	2,441	1,139	1,588	−14.9%
3	Arbroath	13,904	1,110	600	772	+6.3%
4	Airdrieonians	13,832	1,129	450	768	−7.5%
5	Queen's Park	12,376	1,233	428	687	+6.7%
6	East Fife	12,301	1,850	390	683	+9.1%
7	Alloa Athletic	11,663	1,749	363	647	+21.8%
8	Forfar Athletic	11,133	990	428	618	−3.1%
9	Albion Rovers	8,219	1,032	167	456	+1.6%
10	Stranraer	7,967	1,143	201	442	+8.1%
	League total	149,668	4,496	167	831	+47.1%

Updated to games played on 28 April 2018

== Awards ==
=== Monthly awards ===
Month	Manager of the Month		Player of the Month		Ref.
Month	Manager	Club	Player	Club	Ref.
August	(Scotland) Barry Smith	Raith Rovers	(Scotland) Lewis Vaughan	Raith Rovers	
September	(Scotland) Brian Kerr	Albion Rovers	(Scotland) Ryan McCord	Arbroath	
October	(Scotland) Ian McCall	Ayr United	(Scotland) Michael Moffat	Ayr United	
November	(Scotland) Ian McCall	Ayr United	(Scotland) Lawrence Shankland	Ayr United	
December	(Scotland) Barry Smith	Raith Rovers	(Scotland) Alan Trouten	Albion Rovers	
January	(Scotland) Dick Campbell	Arbroath	(Scotland) Angus Beith	Stranraer	
February	(Scotland) Dick Campbell	Arbroath	(France) Willis Furtado	Raith Rovers	
March	(Scotland) Ian McCall	Ayr United	(Scotland) Lawrence Shankland	Ayr United	

== League One play-offs ==
The second bottom team entered into a 4-team playoff with the 2nd, 3rd, and 4th placed teams in League Two.

=== Semi-finals ===
==== First leg ====
1 May 2018	Stenhousemuir	1–1	Queen's Park	Stenhousemuir
19:30	Scott 27'	BBC Report	Leitch 47'	Stadium: Ochilview Park; Attendance: 657; Referee: Alan Newlands

2 May 2018	Stirling Albion	0–1	Peterhead	Stirling
19:45		BBC Report	Robertson 29'	Stadium: Forthbank Stadium; Attendance: 729; Referee: Colin Steven

==== Second leg ====
5 May 2018	Queen's Park	1–2 (2–3 agg.)	Stenhousemuir	Glasgow
15:00	McLauchlan 41'	BBC Report	McGuigan 17', 80'	Stadium: Hampden Park; Attendance: 948; Referee: Euan Anderson

5 May 2018	Peterhead	3–0 (4–0 agg.)	Stirling Albion	Peterhead
15:00	Robertson 38'; McAllister 57'; Brown 65'	BBC Report		Stadium: Balmoor Stadium; Attendance: 861; Referee: Barry Cook

=== Final ===
==== First leg ====
9 May 2018	Stenhousemuir	2–0	Peterhead	Stenhousemuir
19:45	Dunlop 61', 76'	BBC Report		Stadium: Ochilview Park; Attendance: 796; Referee: Gavin Duncan

==== Second leg ====
12 May 2018	Peterhead	1–0 (1–2 agg.)	Stenhousemuir	Peterhead
15:00	McLean 54'	BBC Report		Stadium: Balmoor Stadium; Attendance: 880; Referee: Greg Aitken
