= 2017–18 Scottish Championship =

Ladbrokes Championship
- Season: 2017–18
- Champions: St Mirren
- Promoted: St Mirren; Livingston
- Relegated: Dumbarton; Brechin City
- Matches: 180
- Goals: 472 (2.62 per match)
- Top goalscorer: Stephen Dobbie (18 goals)
- Biggest home win: Falkirk 6–1 Dundee United (6 January 2018); St Mirren 5–0 Dumbarton (27 March 2018)
- Biggest away win: Brechin City 0–5 Dundee United (17 April 2018)
- Highest scoring: Dunfermline Athletic 2–5 Queen of the South (9 December 2017); Falkirk 6–1 Dundee United (6 January 2018); Dumbarton 2–5 Falkirk (21 April 2018)
- Longest winning run: 5 matches: Inverness CT
- Longest unbeaten run: 11 matches: Inverness CT; Livingston
- Longest winless run: 36 matches: Brechin City
- Longest losing run: 16 matches: Brechin City
- Highest attendance: 7,585; Dunfermline Athletic 1–3 Dundee United (30 September 2017)
- Lowest attendance: 392; Dumbarton 0–1 Inverness CT (18 April 2018)
- Total attendance: 518,654
- Average attendance: 2,881
- All statistics correct as of 28 April 2018.

The 2017–18 Scottish Championship (known as the Ladbrokes Championship for sponsorship reasons) was the 24th season in the current format of ten teams in the second tier of Scottish football. The fixtures were published on 23 June 2017.

Ten teams contested the league: Brechin City, Dumbarton, Dundee United, Dunfermline Athletic, Falkirk, Greenock Morton, Inverness CT, Livingston, Queen of the South and St Mirren.

St Mirren won the league title, and promotion to the Premiership, after a 0–0 draw with Livingston on 14 April 2018.

Brechin City became the first team in 126 years to go through a Scottish league season without a win. Their total of four points was the lowest ever recorded in the Scottish second tier, the lowest in the three points for a win era and the joint-lowest in any Scottish division.

== Prize money ==
In April 2018, the SPFL confirmed the prize money to be allocated to the league members at the conclusion of the competitions. The Championship winners would receive £533,000 with a total pot of £24.5 million to be distributed across the four divisions.

== Teams ==
The following teams have changed division since the 2016–17 season.

=== To Championship ===
Promoted from Scottish League One

- Brechin City
- Livingston

Relegated from Scottish Premiership

- Inverness Caledonian Thistle

=== From Championship ===
Relegated to Scottish League One

- Ayr United
- Raith Rovers

Promoted to Scottish Premiership

- Hibernian

=== Stadia and locations ===
Brechin City	Dumbarton	Dundee United	Dunfermline Athletic
Glebe Park	Dumbarton Football Stadium	Tannadice Park	East End Park
Capacity: 4,083	Capacity: 2,020	Capacity: 14,223	Capacity: 11,480
Falkirk	2017–18 Scottish Championship is located in Scotland		Greenock Morton
Falkirk Stadium	2017–18 Scottish Championship is located in Scotland		Cappielow Park
Capacity: 7,937	2017–18 Scottish Championship is located in Scotland		Capacity: 11,589
Inverness Caledonian Thistle	Livingston	Queen of the South	St Mirren
Caledonian Stadium	Almondvale Stadium	Palmerston Park	Paisley 2021 Stadium
Capacity: 7,750	Capacity: 8,716	Capacity: 8,690	Capacity: 8,023

=== Personnel and kits ===
Team	Manager	Captain	Kit manufacturer	Shirt sponsor
Brechin City	(Scotland) Darren Dods	(Scotland) Paul McLean	Pendle	Delson
Dumbarton	(Scotland) Stephen Aitken	(Scotland) Andy Dowie	Joma	Turnberry Homes
Dundee United	(Hungary) Csaba László	(Scotland) Tam Scobbie	Nike	McEwan Fraser Legal
Dunfermline Athletic	(Scotland) Allan Johnston	(Republic of Ireland) Callum Morris	Joma	SRJ Windows
Falkirk	(Scotland) Paul Hartley	(Scotland) Aaron Muirhead	Puma	Central Demolition
Greenock Morton	(Scotland) Jim Duffy	(Scotland) Thomas O'Ware	Vision Outsourcing	Millions
Inverness CT	(Scotland) John Robertson	(England) Gary Warren	Erreà	McEwan Fraser Legal
Livingston	(Scotland) David Hopkin	(Scotland) Craig Halkett	FBT	Tony Macaroni
Queen of the South	(Scotland) Gary Naysmith	(Scotland) John Rankin	Macron	J.B. Houston
St Mirren	(Scotland) Jack Ross	(Scotland) Stephen McGinn	Joma	Skyview Capital

=== Managerial changes ===
Team	Outgoing manager	Manner of departure	Date of vacancy	Position in table	Incoming manager	Date of appointment
Inverness CT	(Republic of Ireland) Richie Foran	Sacked	29 May 2017	Pre-season	(Scotland) John Robertson	14 June 2017
Falkirk	(Scotland) Peter Houston	Sacked	24 September 2017	9th	(Scotland) Alex Smith (interim)	24 September 2017
Falkirk	(Scotland) Alex Smith (interim)	End of interim	4 October 2017	8th	(Scotland) Paul Hartley	4 October 2017
Dundee United	(Scotland) Ray McKinnon	Sacked	24 October 2017	4th	(Scotland) Laurie Ellis (interim)	25 October 2017
Dundee United	(Scotland) Laurie Ellis (interim)	End of interim	8 November 2017	2nd	(Hungary) Csaba László	8 November 2017

== League summary ==
=== League table ===
Pos	Team	Pld	W	D	L	GF	GA	GD	Pts	Promotion, qualification or relegation
1	St Mirren (C, P)	36	23	5	8	63	36	+27	74	Promotion to the Premiership
2	Livingston (O, P)	36	17	11	8	56	37	+19	62	Qualification for the Premiership play-off semi-final
3	Dundee United	36	18	7	11	52	42	+10	61	Qualification for the Premiership play-off quarter-final
4	Dunfermline Athletic	36	16	11	9	60	35	+25	59	Qualification for the Premiership play-off quarter-final
5	Inverness Caledonian Thistle	36	16	9	11	53	37	+16	57	
6	Queen of the South	36	14	10	12	59	53	+6	52	
7	Greenock Morton	36	13	11	12	47	40	+7	50	
8	Falkirk	36	12	11	13	45	49	−4	47	
9	Dumbarton (R)	36	7	9	20	27	63	−36	30	Qualification for the Championship play-offs
10	Brechin City (R)	36	0	4	32	20	90	−70	4	Relegation to League One

Source: Soccerway
Rules for classification: 1) Points; 2) Goal difference; 3) Goals scored; 4) Points in head-to-head matches; 5) Goal difference in hth matches; 6). Goals scored in hth matches; 7). Play-off (only for deciding promotion, play-off participation and relegation).
(C) Champions; (O) Play-off winners; (P) Promoted; (R) Relegated

=== Positions by Round ===
The table lists the positions of teams after each week of matches. In order to preserve chronological progress, any postponed matches are not included in the round at which they were originally scheduled, but added to the full round they were played immediately afterwards. For example, if a match is scheduled for matchday 13, but then postponed and played between days 16 and 17, it will be added to the standings for day 16.

Leader - Promotion to 2018–19 Scottish Premiership
Qualification to Premiership play-off semi-finals
Qualification to Premiership play-off quarter-finals
Qualification to Championship play-offs
Relegation to 2018–19 Scottish League One

Team \ Round	1	2	3	4	5	6	7	8	9	10	11	12	13	14	15	16	17	18	19	20	21	22	23	24	25	26	27	28	29	30	31	32	33	34	35	36
St Mirren	2	5	4	3	1	2	2	1	1	1	1	1	2	1	2	2	1	1	1	1	1	1	1	1	1	1	1	1	1	1	1	1	1	1	1	1
Livingston	5	6	7	6	6	6	4	4	2	3	2	3	3	3	3	4	4	3	3	3	4	4	3	2	2	2	2	2	2	2	2	2	2	2	2	2
Dundee United	3	1	1	4	4	4	3	2	4	4	4	2	1	2	1	1	2	2	2	2	2	2	2	3	3	4	4	3	3	4	5	4	4	3	3	3
Dunfermline Athletic	4	2	2	1	2	1	1	3	3	2	3	4	4	4	4	5	5	4	4	4	3	3	4	4	5	5	6	5	5	5	4	3	3	4	4	4
Inverness Caledonian Thistle	8	10	10	7	7	8	8	9	9	8	7	7	8	7	8	8	7	7	7	7	7	6	7	7	7	7	8	8	8	8	8	7	6	5	5	5
Queen of the South	1	4	3	2	3	5	6	5	6	5	5	5	5	5	6	3	3	6	6	6	6	5	5	6	6	6	5	6	6	6	6	6	7	7	7	6
Greenock Morton	7	3	5	5	5	3	5	6	5	6	6	6	6	6	5	6	6	5	5	5	5	7	6	5	4	3	3	4	4	3	3	5	5	6	6	7
Falkirk	9	8	9	9	9	9	9	8	8	9	9	9	9	9	9	9	9	9	9	9	9	9	8	8	8	8	7	7	7	7	7	8	8	8	8	8
Dumbarton	6	7	6	8	8	7	7	7	7	7	8	8	7	8	7	7	8	8	8	8	8	8	9	9	9	9	9	9	9	9	9	9	9	9	9	9
Brechin City	10	9	8	10	10	10	10	10	10	10	10	10	10	10	10	10	10	10	10	10	10	10	10	10	10	10	10	10	10	10	10	10	10	10	10	10

Updated: 28 April 2018

== Results ==
Teams play each other four times, twice in the first half of the season (home and away) and twice in the second half of the season (home and away), making a total of 180 games, with each team playing 36.

=== First half of season ===
Home \ Away	BRE	DUM	DUN	DNF	FAL	GMO	INV	LIV	QOS	STM
Brechin City	—	0–1	1–1	0–3	1–1	0–1	0–4	2–2	0–1	1–2
Dumbarton	2–1	—	0–2	0–4	0–0	0–0	2–1	1–4	2–2	0–2
Dundee United	1–0	1–1	—	2–1	3–0	2–1	0–2	3–0	2–1	2–1
Dunfermline Athletic	2–1	2–2	1–3	—	3–1	1–1	5–1	3–1	2–5	3–0
Falkirk	3–1	1–1	0–0	1–1	—	0–3	0–0	0–2	1–4	0–0
Greenock Morton	4–1	1–1	0–2	3–2	0–1	—	1–0	0–1	1–2	4–1
Inverness CT	4–0	1–0	0–1	1–0	4–1	1–1	—	1–3	0–0	0–2
Livingston	3–2	2–1	2–0	1–1	0–0	1–1	0–0	—	2–2	1–3
Queen of the South	4–1	1–0	1–3	0–0	4–2	1–2	0–0	0–3	—	2–3
St Mirren	2–1	0–1	3–0	1–0	3–1	2–2	4–2	3–1	3–1	—

Source: Scottish Championship
Legend: Blue = home team win; Yellow = draw; Red = away team win.

=== Second half of season ===
Home \ Away	BRE	DUM	DUN	DNF	FAL	GMO	INV	LIV	QOS	STM
Brechin City	—	1–3	0–5	0–3	0–1	1–1	2–3	0–2	1–5	0–1
Dumbarton	1–0	—	3–2	0–1	2–5	0–1	0–1	0–3	0–1	0–2
Dundee United	4–1	2–0	—	1–1	1–0	0–3	1–1	2–0	2–3	1–0
Dunfermline Athletic	4–0	4–0	0–0	—	2–0	0–0	1–0	1–0	3–1	1–2
Falkirk	3–0	0–0	6–1	1–2	—	3–1	3–1	1–3	3–2	1–0
Greenock Morton	2–0	3–2	1–1	2–1	0–1	—	0–3	0–1	0–1	1–1
Inverness CT	4–0	5–1	1–0	2–2	1–0	0–2	—	1–1	3–1	2–2
Livingston	3–0	2–0	2–1	0–0	0–0	3–2	0–1	—	0–1	4–1
Queen of the South	3–1	0–0	3–0	0–0	2–2	1–1	0–2	3–3	—	1–3
St Mirren	1–0	5–0	2–0	2–0	1–2	2–1	1–0	0–0	2–0	—

Source: Scottish Championship
Legend: Blue = home team win; Yellow = draw; Red = away team win.

== Season statistics ==
=== Scoring ===
==== Top scorers ====
As of matches played on 28 April 2018

Rank	Player	Club	Goals
1	(Scotland) Stephen Dobbie	Queen of the South	18
2	(Australia) Scott McDonald	Dundee United	15
3	(Scotland) Nicky Clark	Dunfermline Athletic	14
3	(Scotland) Lewis Morgan	St Mirren	14
5	(Scotland) Gavin Reilly	St Mirren	11
6	(England) Kallum Higginbotham	Dunfermline Athletic	10
6	(Scotland) Cammy Smith	St Mirren	10

==== Hat-tricks ====
Player	For	Against	Result	Date	Ref
(Scotland) Stephen Dobbie	Queen of the South	Falkirk	4–1	26 August 2017	
(Scotland) Stephen Dobbie	Queen of the South	Dunfermline Athletic	5–2	10 December 2017	
(Scotland) Stephen Dobbie	Queen of the South	Brechin City	3–1	27 January 2018	
(Scotland) Stephen Dobbie	Queen of the South	Brechin City	5–1	28 April 2018	
(Scotland) Nicky Clark	Dunfermline Athletic	Brechin City	3–0	20 March 2018	
(Scotland) Nicky Clark	Dunfermline Athletic	Queen of the South	3–1	31 March 2018	
(Scotland) Nathan Austin	Inverness Caledonian Thistle	Dumbarton	5–1	14 April 2018	

=== Discipline ===
==== Player ====
===== Yellow cards =====
As of matches played on 28 April 2018

Rank	Player	Club	Cards
1	(Scotland) Iain Vigurs	Inverness Caledonian Thistle	14
2	(Scotland) Brad McKay	Inverness Caledonian Thistle	13
3	(England) James Dale	Brechin City	10
3	(Scotland) Gary Harkins	Greenock Morton	10

===== Red cards =====
As of matches played on 28 April 2018

Rank	Player	Club	Cards
1	(Scotland) Aron Lynas	Brechin City	2
1	(Scotland) Craig Barr	Dumbarton	2
1	(Scotland) Paul McMullan	Dundee United	2
1	(Scotland) Iain Vigurs	Inverness Caledonian Thistle	2
5	28 players		1

==== Club ====
===== Yellow cards =====
As of matches played on 28 April 2018

Rank	Club	Cards
1	Inverness CT	76
2	Dunfermline Athletic	72
3	Brechin City	69

===== Red cards =====
As of matches played on 28 April 2018

Rank	Club	Cards
1	Inverness CT	7
2	Brechin City	5
2	Dumbarton	5
2	Livingston	5

=== Attendances ===
Pos	Team	Total	High	Low	Average	Change
1	Dundee United	99,097	6,936	3,620	5,505	−16.4%
2	Dunfermline Athletic	94,382	7,585	2,249	5,243	+18.1%
3	Falkirk	84,175	6,094	3,864	4,676	−7.1%
4	St Mirren	80,061	6,422	3,023	4,447	+23.6%
5	Inverness Caledonian Thistle	41,296	3,415	1,801	2,294	−41.9%
6	Greenock Morton	35,739	4,661	1,134	1,985	−15.9%
7	Queen of the South	26,232	2,019	1,062	1,457	−21.5%
8	Livingston	24,268	2,708	732	1,348	+69.3%
9	Brechin City	16,619	2,627	445	923	+115.7%
10	Dumbarton	15,085	1,652	392	838	−25.8%
	League total	518,654	7,585	392	2,881	−35.8%

Updated to games played on 28 April 2018

== Awards ==
=== Monthly awards ===
Month	Manager of the Month		Player of the Month		Ref.
Month	Manager	Club	Player	Club	Ref.
August	(Scotland) Allan Johnston	Dunfermline Athletic	(England) Joe Cardle	Dunfermline Athletic	
September	(Scotland) David Hopkin	Livingston	(Scotland) Lewis Morgan	St Mirren	
October	(Scotland) John Robertson	Inverness CT	(England) Carl Tremarco	Inverness CT	
November	(Scotland) Stephen Aitken	Dumbarton	(Scotland) Scott Fraser	Dundee United	
December	(Scotland) Jack Ross	St Mirren	(Scotland) Stephen Dobbie	Queen of the South	
January	(Scotland) Jack Ross	St Mirren	(Scotland) Stephen McGinn	St Mirren	
February	(Scotland) David Hopkin	Livingston	(Scotland) Ryan Hardie	Livingston	
March	(Scotland) Jack Ross	St Mirren	(Scotland) Nicky Clark	Dunfermline Athletic	

== Championship play-offs ==
The second bottom team will enter into a 4-team playoff with the 2nd-4th placed teams in League One.

=== Semi-finals ===
==== First leg ====
2 May 2018	Arbroath	1–2	Dumbarton	Arbroath
19:45	Linn 64'	BBC Report	Gallagher 55'; Barr 90'	Stadium: Gayfield Park; Attendance: 892; Referee: Nick Walsh

2 May 2018	Alloa Athletic	2–0	Raith Rovers	Alloa
19:45	Stewart 22'; Flannigan 58'	BBC Report		Stadium: Recreation Park; Attendance: 1123; Referee: Don Robertson

==== Second leg ====
5 May 2018	Dumbarton	1–1 (3–2 agg.)	Arbroath	Dumbarton
15:00	Hill 9'	BBC Report	Swankie 27'	Stadium: Dumbarton Football Stadium; Attendance: 872; Referee: Craig Charleston

5 May 2018	Raith Rovers	1–2 (1–4 agg.)	Alloa Athletic	Kirkcaldy
15:00	Murray 53'	BBC Report	Kirkpatrick 40'; Stewart 81'	Stadium: Stark's Park; Attendance: 1,831; Referee: Stephen Finnie

=== Final ===
==== First leg ====
9 May 2018	Alloa Athletic	0–1	Dumbarton	Alloa
19:45		BBC Report	Carswell 6'	Stadium: Recreation Park; Attendance: 811; Referee: John McKendrick

==== Second leg ====
13 May 2018	Dumbarton	0–2 (a.e.t.) (1–2 agg.)	Alloa Athletic	Dumbarton
16:10		BBC Report	Stewart 90+3'; Kirkpatrick 95'	Stadium: Dumbarton Football Stadium; Attendance: 1,115; Referee: John Beaton
