= List of Alloa Athletic F.C. seasons =

This is an incomplete list of Alloa Athletic Football Club seasons up to the present day. The list details Alloa's record in major league and cup competitions, and the club's top league goal scorer of each season. Top scorers in bold were also the top scorers in Alloa's division that season. Records of competitions such as the Stirlingshire Cup are not included.

Formed as Alloa in 1880, the football club shortly changed its name to Alloa Association, and then to Alloa Athletic in 1881. In 1883 the club was admitted to the Scottish Football Association but had to wait until 1921 before being elected to the Scottish Football League.

== Seasons ==
Season	League									Scottish Cup	League Cup	Challenge Cup	Top league goalscorer	
Season	Division	P	W	D	L	F	A	Pts	Pos	Scottish Cup	League Cup	Challenge Cup	Name	Goals
1975–76	SFL 2	26	14	7	5	44	28	35	3rd	R3	R1	n/a (Note: The Scottish Challenge Cup competition did not begin until 1990.)		
1976–77	SFL 2	39	19	13	7	73	45	51	2nd	R4	R1	n/a		
1977–78	SFL 1	39	8	8	23	44	84	24	13th	R3	R1	n/a		
1978–79	SFL 2	39	16	9	14	57	62	41	6th	R3	R2	n/a		
1979–80	SFL 2	39	11	7	21	44	64	29	14th	R3	R1	n/a		
1980–81	SFL 2	39	15	12	12	61	54	42	6th	R1	R2	n/a		
1981–82	SFL 2	39	19	12	8	66	42	50	2nd	R4	R1	n/a		
1982–83	SFL 1	39	14	11	14	52	52	39	6th	R3	R1	n/a		
1983–84	SFL 1	39	8	10	21	41	64	26	14th	R3	R3	n/a		
1984–85	SFL 2	39	20	10	9	58	40	50	2nd	R3	R2	n/a		
1985–86	SFL 1	39	6	14	19	49	74	26	14th	R4	R2	n/a		
1986–87	SFL 2	39	17	7	15	48	50	41	6th	R1	R2	n/a		
1987–88	SFL 2	39	16	8	15	50	46	40	7th	R2	R1	n/a		
1988–89	SFL 2	39	17	11	11	66	48	45	2nd	QF	R1	n/a		
1989–90	SFL 1	39	6	13	20	41	70	25	14th	R3	R2	n/a		
1990–91	SFL 2	39	13	11	15	51	46	37	9th	R1	R2	R2		
1991–92	SFL 2	39	20	10	9	58	38	50	3rd	R2	R2	R1		
1992–93	SFL 2	39	16	12	11	63	54	44	6th	R2	R2	R1		
1993–94	SFL 2 (Note: Due to league restructuring the teams ranked 7th to 14th of the 1993–94 Second Division were moved from the Second Division to create a new Third Division for the 1994–95 season. Points restructuring also saw three points awarded for a win and one for a draw in the seasons following. This was changed from two for a win and one for a draw.)	39	12	17	10	41	39	41	7th	R4	R2	R1		
1994–95	SFL 3	36	15	9	12	50	45	54	5th	R2	R1	R2		
1995–96	SFL 3	36	6	11	19	26	58	29	9th	R2	R2	R2		
1996–97	SFL 3	36	16	7	13	50	47	55	4th	R3	R3	R1		
1997–98	SFL 3	36	24	4	8	78	39	76	1st	R3	R2	R1	Willie Irvine	18
1998–99	SFL 2	36	13	7	16	65	56	46	5th	R1	R3	— (Note: The 1998–99 Scottish Challenge Cup tournament was suspended due to lack of sponsorship.)		
1999–2000	SFL 2	36	17	13	6	58	38	64	2nd	R4	R3	Winners	Martin Cameron	16
2000–01	SFL 1	36	7	11	18	38	61	32	10th	R3	R2	R1	Willie Irvine	5
2001–02	SFL 2	36	15	14	7	55	33	59	2nd	R3	R2	Runners-up	Gareth Hutchison	14
2002–03	SFL 1	36	9	8	19	39	72	35	9th	R4	R2	R2	Robert Sloan	8
2003–04	SFL 2	36	12	8	16	55	55	44	7th	R2	R1	R1	Ross Hamilton	13
2004–05	SFL 2	36	12	10	14	66	68	46	6th	R4	R2	R2	Andy Brown	8
2005–06	SFL 2	36	8	8	20	36	77	32	9th	R4	R2	R1	Jamie Stevenson	8
2006–07	SFL 2	36	11	9	16	47	70	42	7th	R1	R3	R2	Graeme Brown	6
2007–08	SFL 2	36	16	8	12	57	56	56	4th	R3	R1	R1	Graeme Brown	10
2008–09	SFL 2	36	11	8	17	47	59	41	8th	R4	R2	R2	Andy Scott	7
2009–10	SFL 2	36	19	8	9	49	35	65	2nd	R4	R2	R1	Stuart Noble	10
2010–11	SFL 2	36	9	9	18	49	71	36	9th	R4	R2	R1	Bryan Prunty	8
2011–12	SFL 3	36	23	8	5	70	39	77	1st	R2	R1	R1	Stevie May	19
2012–13	SFL 2	36	20	7	9	62	35	67	2nd	R3	R1	R1	Kevin Cawley	13
2013–14	SC	36	11	7	18	34	51	40	8th	R5	R2	R1	Kevin Cawley	8
2014–15	SC	36	6	9	21	34	56	27	9th	R4	R2	Runners-up	Liam Buchanan	14
2015–16	SC	36	4	9	23	22	67	21	10th	R3	R1	R2	Michael Duffy	3
2016–17	L1	36	17	11	8	69	44	62	2nd	R4	QF	QF	Greig Spence	16
2017–18	L1	36	17	9	10	56	43	60	3rd	R4	Group	R2	Kris Renton	5
2018–19	SC	36	10	9	17	39	53	39	8th	R4	Group	QF	Alan Trouten	10
2019–20	SC	28	7	10	11	33	43	31	8th	R4	Group	R4	Kevin O'Hara	10
2020–21	SC	27	5	7	15	30	60	22	10th	R2	QF	— (Note: The 2020–21 Scottish Challenge Cup tournament was cancelled because of the COVID-19 pandemic.)	Innes Cameron	6
2021–22	L1	36	12	9	15	49	57	45	5th	R4	Group	R3	Euan Henderson	14
2022–23	L1	36	17	6	13	56	47	57	4th	R4	Group	R4	Conor Sammon	13
2023–24	L1	36	16	8	12	60	55	56	3rd	R4	Group	R3	Bobby Wales	12
2024–25	L1	36	13	12	11	55	47	51	5th	R3	Group	QF	Luke Rankin	10

== Key ==
Champions	Runners-up	Promoted	Relegated

- P = Played
- W = Games won
- D = Games drawn
- L = Games lost
- F = Goals for
- A = Goals against
- Pts = Points
- Pos = Final position
- R1 = Round 1
- R2 = Round 2
- R3 = Round 3
- R4 = Round 4
- QF = Quarter-finals
- SF = Semi-finals
- SFL 1 = Scottish First Division
- SFL 2 = Scottish Second Division
- SFL 3 = Scottish Third Division
