= 2015–16 Alloa Athletic F.C. season =

Alloa Athletic
2015–16 season
- Chairman: Mike Mulraney
- Manager: Danny Lennon (until December 2015); Jack Ross (December 2015–)
- Stadium: Recreation Park
- Championship: 10th (relegated)
- Challenge Cup: Second round
- League Cup: First round
- Scottish Cup: Third round

The 2015–16 season will be Alloa Athletic's third consecutive season back in the second tier of Scottish football and their third season in the Scottish Championship, having been promoted through playoffs from the Scottish Second Division at the end of the 2012–13 season. Alloa will also compete in the Challenge Cup, League Cup and the Scottish Cup.

== Results & fixtures ==
Win Draw Loss Abandoned or Postponed

=== Scottish Championship ===
8 August 2015	Queen of the South	3–1	Alloa Athletic	Palmerston Park
15:00 BST	Lyle 5'; Russell 29', 38'	BBC Report	Flannigan 49'	Attendance: 1,726; Referee: Anderson

16 August 2015	Alloa Athletic	1–5	Rangers	Recreation Park
12:30	Chopra 7'	BBC Report	Tavernier 4'; Waghorn 9' (pen.); Holt 39'; Miller 43', 85'	Attendance: 3,047; Referee: Allan

22 August 2015	Raith Rovers	3–0	Alloa Athletic	Stark's Park
15:00	Craigen 55'; Wighton 60'; Stewart 84'	BBC Report		Attendance: 1,458; Referee: Graham

29 August 2015	Alloa Athletic	0–1	Greenock Morton	Recreation Park
15:00		BBC Report	Thomas O'Ware 72'	Attendance: 825; Referee: Walsh

5 September 2015	Dumbarton	0–2	Alloa Athletic	Dumbarton Football Stadium
15:00		BBC Report	Holmes 59'; Ferns 90+3'	Attendance: 715; Referee: Charleston

12 September 2015	Hibernian	3–0	Alloa Athletic	Easter Road
15:00	Henderson 44'; Cummings 50'; McGinn 65'	BBC Report		Attendance: 7,774; Referee: McKendrick

19 September 2015	Alloa Athletic	1–1	Falkirk	Cappielow
15:00	Marr (red card) 68'; Hamilton 90'	BBC Report	Baird 68' (pen.)	Attendance: 1,572; Referee: Robertson

26 September 2015	Alloa Athletic	0–3	Livingston	Recreation Park
15:00		BBC Report	Buchanan 23', 78'; Sheerin 59'	Attendance: 622; Referee: Northcroft

3 October 2015	St Mirren	1–1	Alloa Athletic	St Mirren Park
15:00	Shankland 68'	BBC Report	Marr 75'	Attendance: 2,994; Referee: Charleston

17 October 2015	Alloa Athletic	0–1	Raith Rovers	Recreation Park
15:00	Marr (yellow card) 13'; Crawford (yellow card) 72'	Report	Anderson 79'	Attendance: 808; Referee: (Scotland) Andrew Dallas

24 October 2015	Greenock Morton	1–0	Alloa Athletic	Cappielow
15:00	Forbes 55'; Pepper (yellow card) 77'	Report	Michael Doyle (yellow card) 55'	Attendance: 1,716; Referee: (Scotland) Brian Colvin

31 October 2015	Alloa Athletic	1–2	Queen of the South	Recreation Park
15:00	Holmes 1' (yellow card) 89'; Michael Doyle (yellow card) 23'; Williams (yellow card) 71'	Report	Oliver 46' 55'; Kidd (yellow card) 90+2'	Attendance: 616; Referee: (Scotland) Craig Thomson (referee)

7 November 2015	Rangers	4–0	Alloa Athletic	Ibrox Stadium
15:00	Waghorn 10' 44'; Tavernier 14'; Wallace (yellow card) 17'; Kiernan (yellow card) 72'; Clark 90+2'	Report	Chopra (yellow card) 15'; Ferns (yellow card) 65' (red card) 79'	Attendance: 43,242; Referee: (Scotland) Stephen Finnie

14 November 2015	Falkirk	5–0	Alloa Athletic	Falkirk Stadium
15:00	Baird 12', 31', 44'; McHugh 63'; Leahy 81'	BBC Report		Attendance: 3,550; Referee: Clancy

21 November 2015	Alloa Athletic	0–1	Hibernian	Indodrill Stadium
15:00		BBC Report	Cummings 60'	Attendance: 1,952; Referee: Cook

5 December 2015	Alloa Athletic	0–2	Dumbarton	Indodrill Stadium
15:00	Williams (yellow card) 56'	Report	Routledge (yellow card) 63'; Docherty 71'; Gallagher 87'	Attendance: 492; Referee: (Scotland) Willie Collum

12 December 2015	Livingston	0–1	Alloa Athletic	Tony Macaroni Arena
15:00	Glen (yellow card) 12'; Gallagher (yellow card) 89'	Report	Hill (yellow card) 59'; Crawford 64'	Attendance: 937; Referee: (Scotland) Brian Colvin

19 December 2015	Alloa Athletic	0–2	St Mirren	Indodrill Stadium
15:00	Hamilton (yellow card) 6'	Report	Shankland 13'; Gallagher 59'	Attendance: 912; Referee: (Scotland) Alan Muir

26 December 2015	Raith Rovers	P–P	Alloa Athletic	Stark's Park
		Report		Referee: Aitken
Note: Postponed due to a waterlogged pitch.

2 January 2016	Alloa Athletic	0–1	Falkirk	Indodrill Stadium
17:15	Hamilton (yellow card) 72'	Report	Baird 15'	Attendance: 1,176; Referee: (Scotland) John McKendrick

12 January 2016	Raith Rovers	0–1	Alloa Athletic	Stark's Park
19:45	Robertson (yellow card) 13'	Report	Flannigan (yellow card) 18' (goal) 86' (pen.)	Attendance: 1,064; Referee: (Scotland) Greg Aitken

16 January 2016	Alloa Athletic	A–A	Greenock Morton	Indodrill Stadium
15:00	Duffy 41'	BBC Report		Referee: Muir
Note: Abandoned 22 minutes into the second half because of heavy snow.

23 January 2016	Queen of the South	1–0	Alloa Athletic	Palmerston Park
15:00	Russell 41'	Report	Doyle (yellow card) 87'	Attendance: 1,559; Referee: (Scotland) John Beaton

30 January 2016	St Mirren	3–1	Alloa Athletic	The Paisley 2021 Stadium
15:00	Watson (yellow card) 9' (goal) 37'; Gallagher 59'; Mallan 90'	Report	Layne 9' (pen.); Scott McKenna (yellow card) 13'; Hamilton (yellow card) 19'; Gallacher (yellow card) 40'; Hill (yellow card) 74'; Crawford (yellow card) 77'	Attendance: 2,589; Referee: (Scotland) Craig Charleston

9 February 2016	Alloa Athletic	2–2	Greenock Morton	Indodrill Stadium
19:30	Hamilton 19'; Megginson (yellow card) 60'; Hill 71'	Report	McManus 14'; McCluskey 17'	Attendance: 535; Referee: (Scotland) Alan Muir

13 February 2016	Alloa Athletic	1–1	Rangers	Indodrill Stadium
15:00	Marr 61' (yellow card) 62'	Report	O'Halloran 83'	Attendance: 3,100; Referee: (Scotland) Don Robertson

21 February 2016	Hibernian	3–0	Alloa Athletic	Easter Road
15:00	Boyle 5' (yellow card) 31' (goal) 77'; Carmichael 40'	Report	Marr (yellow card) 17'; McAusland (yellow card) 78'	Attendance: 8,765; Referee: (Scotland) Nick Walsh

27 February 2016	Alloa Athletic	1–3	Livingston	Indodrill Stadium
15:00	Duffy 19'	Report	Longridge 11'; White 14'; Stanton 39'; Cole (yellow card) 50'; Fotheringham (yellow card) 70'	Attendance: 619; Referee: (Scotland) Craig Charleston

5 March 2016	Falkirk	2–0	Alloa Athletic	Falkirk Stadium
15:00	Watson 28'; Kerr 36'	Report	Marr (yellow card) 80'; Ferns (yellow card) 85'	Attendance: 3,774; Referee: (Scotland) Steven McLean

8 March 2016	Dumbarton	3–1	Alloa Athletic	Dumbarton Football Stadium
19:45	Nadé 28', 32', 47'; Routledge (red card) 64'	Report	Megginson 31'	Attendance: 468; Referee: (Scotland) Willie Collum

12 March 2016	Alloa Athletic	1–1	Raith Rovers	Indodrill Stadium
15:00	Hetherington (yellow card) 24' (goal) 64'; Marr (yellow card) 74'; Flannigan (yellow card) 79'	Report	Benedictus 90'	Attendance: 762; Referee: (Scotland) George Salmond

19 March 2016	Greenock Morton	4–1	Alloa Athletic	Cappielow
15:00	Marr 15' (o.g.); McManus 78'; Forbes 17'; Johnstone 81'	Report	McAusland 39' (yellow card) 83'	Attendance: 1,513; Referee: (Scotland) Euan Anderson

26 March 2016	Alloa Athletic	0–1	St. Mirren	Indodrill Stadium
15:00	Hetherington (yellow card) 61'	Report	Watson 85'	Attendance: 753; Referee: (Scotland) Mat Northcroft

2 April 2016	Livingston	0–0	Alloa Athletic	Tony Macaroni Arena
15:00	Neill (yellow card) 70'; Gordon (yellow card) 85'	Report	Hamilton (yellow card) 67'; Hetherington (yellow card) 83' (red card) 86'	Attendance: 927; Referee: (Scotland) Alan Muir

9 April 2016	Alloa Athletic	1–0	Hibernian	Indodrill Stadium
15:00	Duffy 45'; Flannigan (yellow card) 69'	Report	Dagnall (yellow card) 86'	Attendance: 1,364; Referee: (Scotland) Bobby Madden

16 April 2016	Alloa Athletic	2–2	Queen of the South	Indodrill Stadium
15:00	Flannigan 38' (pen.); Marr (yellow card) 54'; McManus (yellow card) 66' (goal) 76'	Report	Lyle 67' (pen.); Dowie (yellow card) 80'; Hilson 85'	Attendance: 512; Referee: (Scotland) Gavin Duncan

23 April 2016	Rangers	1–1	Alloa Athletic	Ibrox Stadium
12:30	Tavernier 45'	Report	Duffy 8'; Megginson (yellow card) 14'; Flannigan (yellow card) 32'; Caddis (yellow card) 61'	Attendance: 50,349; Referee: (Scotland) Craig Charleston

1 May 2016	Alloa Athletic	1–1	Dumbarton	Indodrill Stadium
12:30	Layne 7'; Hamilton (yellow card) 37'	Report	McCallum 51'; Barr (yellow card) 64'; Waters (yellow card) 90+2'	Attendance: 515; Referee: (Scotland) Barry Cook

=== Scottish Challenge Cup ===
25 July 2015 First round	Brora Rangers	0–1	Alloa Athletic	Dudgeon Park
15:00		BBC Report	Mitchell 49'	Attendance: 265; Referee: Northcroft

19 August 2015 Second round	Alloa Athletic	0–2 (a.e.t.)	Elgin City	Recreation Park
15:00		BBC Report	Gunn 104' (pen.); McKenzie 111' (pen.)	Attendance: 240; Referee: Salmond

=== League Cup ===
1 August 2015 First round	Berwick Rangers	3–2 (a.e.t.)	Alloa Athletic	Shielfield Park
15:00	Lavery 56'; Morris 77'; Banjo 97'	BBC Report	Flannigan 6', 21'	Attendance: 405; Referee: Charleston

=== Scottish Cup ===
28 November 2015 Third round	Dumbarton	P–P	Alloa Athletic	Dumbarton Football Stadium
15:00		BBC Report
Note: Postponed due to waterlogged pitch

8 December 2015 Third round	Dumbarton	5–0	Alloa Athletic	Dumbarton Football Stadium
19:30	McCallum 1'; Barr (yellow card) 9'; Fleming 14'; Kirkpatrick 78' 90+2'; Waters 90'	Report	Flannigan (yellow card) 53'; Chopra (yellow card) 72'	Attendance: 274; Referee: (Scotland) Stephen Finnie

== Player statistics ==
=== Squad ===
Last updated 26 March 2016

No.	Pos	Nat	Player	Total		Scottish Championship		Challenge Cup		League Cup		Scottish Cup	
No.	Pos	Nat	Player	Apps	Goals	Apps	Goals	Apps	Goals	Apps	Goals	Apps	Goals
1	GK	(Scotland) SCO	Andrew McNeil	15	0	13+0	0	0+0	0	1+0	0	1+0	0
2	DF	(Scotland) SCO	Kyle McAusland	28	1	19+8	1	0+0	0	0+0	0	0+1	0
3	DF	(Scotland) SCO	Dougie Hill	27	1	24+0	1	1+0	0	1+0	0	1+0	0
4	DF	(Estonia) EST	Mikk Reintam	15	0	11+1	0	1+0	0	1+0	0	1+0	0
5	DF	(Scotland) SCO	Colin Hamilton	31	2	29+0	2	0+0	0	1+0	0	1+0	0
6	DF	(Scotland) SCO	Jason Marr	24	2	22+2	2	0+0	0	0+0	0	0+0	0
7	FW	(Northern Ireland) NIR	Michael Duffy	32	1	26+3	1	1+0	0	1+0	0	1+0	0
8	MF	(Scotland) SCO	Burton O'Brien	28	0	27+0	0	0+0	0	1+0	0	0+0	0
9	FW	(England) ENG	Michael Chopra	17	1	12+3	1	0+1	0	0+0	0	0+1	0
10	MF	(Scotland) SCO	Graeme Holmes	23	2	18+3	2	0+1	0	0+0	0	1+0	0
11	MF	(Scotland) SCO	Eddie Ferns	27	1	3+21	1	1+0	0	1+0	0	0+1	0
12	FW	(Scotland) SCO	Omar Kader	3	0	0+1	0	1+0	0	0+1	0	0+0	0
12	DF	(Scotland) SCO	Scott McKenna	4	0	4+0	0	0+0	0	0+0	0	0+0	0
12	MF	(Scotland) SCO	Liam Caddis	3	0	2+1	0	0+0	0	0+0	0	0+0	0
13	DF	(Romania) ROU	Cătălin Păun	3	0	0+1	0	1+0	0	1+0	0	0+0	0
14	MF	(Scotland) SCO	Connor McManus	31	0	26+2	0	1+0	0	1+0	0	1+0	0
15	DF	(Scotland) SCO	Michael Doyle	14	0	13+0	0	0+0	0	0+0	0	1+0	0
16	MF	(Scotland) SCO	Iain Flannigan	20	4	14+4	2	0+0	0	1+0	2	1+0	0
17	FW	(England) ENG	Issac Layne	16	1	6+8	1	1+0	0	0+1	0	0+0	0
18	MF	(England) ENG	Steven Hetherington	15	1	9+5	1	0+0	0	0+0	0	1+0	0
19	DF	(Scotland) SCO	Ryan Finnie	7	0	7+0	0	0+0	0	0+0	0	0+0	0
20	DF	(Scotland) SCO	Mark Williams	14	0	6+6	0	1+0	0	0+1	0	0+0	0
21	GK	(Scotland) SCO	David Crawford	12	0	10+1	0	1+0	0	0+0	0	0+0	0
22	DF	(Scotland) SCO	Ryan Hoggan	2	0	0+1	0	1+0	0	0+0	0	0+0	0
23	FW	(Scotland) SCO	Geoff Mitchell	6	0	4+0	0	0+1	0	1+0	0	0+0	0
23	MF	(Scotland) SCO	Mitchel Megginson	10	1	10+0	1	0+0	0	0+0	0	0+0	0
24	FW	(Scotland) SCO	Scott Hynd	5	0	1+4	0	0+0	0	0+0	0	0+0	0
25	FW	(Scotland) SCO	Aron Lynas	1	0	0+1	0	0+0	0	0+0	0	0+0	0
26	DF	(Scotland) SCO	Lewis Wilson	0	0	0+0	0	0+0	0	0+0	0	0+0	0
27	MF	(Scotland) SCO	Robbie Crawford	19	1	14+4	1	0+0	0	0+0	0	1+0	0
28	MF	(Scotland) SCO	Michael Hardie	1	0	0+1	0	0+0	0	0+0	0	0+0	0
41	GK	(Scotland) SCO	Scott Gallacher	11	0	11+0	0	0+0	0	0+0	0	0+0	0

== Team statistics ==
=== League table ===
Pos	Team	Pld	W	D	L	GF	GA	GD	Pts	Promotion, qualification or relegation
6	St Mirren	36	11	9	16	44	53	−9	42	
7	Queen of the South	36	12	6	18	46	56	−10	42	
8	Dumbarton	36	10	7	19	35	66	−31	37	
9	Livingston (R)	36	8	7	21	37	51	−14	31	Qualification for the Championship play-offs
10	Alloa Athletic (R)	36	4	9	23	22	67	−45	21	Relegation to League One

Source: Soccerway
Rules for classification: 1) Points; 2) Goal difference; 3) Number of goals scored
(R) Relegated

=== Division summary ===
Round	1	2	3	4	5	6	7	8	9	10	11	12	13	14	15	16	17	18	19	20	21	22	23	24	25	26	27	28	29	30	31	32	33	34	35	36
Ground	A	H	A	H	A	A	H	H	A	H	A	H	A	A	H	H	A	H	H	A	A	A	H	H	A	H	A	A	H	A	H	A	H	H	A	H
Result	L	L	L	L	W	L	D	L	D	L	L	L	L	L	L	L	W	L	L	W	L	L	D	D	L	L	L	L	D	L	L	D	W	D	D	D
Position	8	10	10	10	9	9	9	10	9	10	10	10	10	10	10	10	10	10	10	10	10	10	10	10	10	10	10	10	10	10	10	10	10	10	10	10

Updated to match(es) played on 23 April 2016. Source:
A = Away; H = Home; W = Win; D = Draw; L = Loss

== Transfers ==
=== Players in ===
Player	From	Fee
(Scotland) Andrew McNeil	(Scotland) Airdrieonians	Free
(Scotland) Colin Hamilton	(Scotland) Brechin	Free
(Scotland) Burton O'Brien	(Scotland) Livingston	Free
(Scotland) Dougie Hill	(Scotland) Raith Rovers	Free
(Scotland) Kyle McAusland	(Scotland) Dunfermline Athletic	Free
(Scotland) Dale Hilson	(Scotland) Forfar Athletic	Free
(Northern Ireland) Michael Duffy	(Scotland) Celtic	Loan
(Scotland) Connor McManus	(Scotland) Celtic	Loan
(Scotland) Omar Kader	(Scotland) Forfar Athletic	Free
(Romania) Cătălin Păun	(Scotland) Stirling University	Free
(Scotland) David Crawford	(Scotland) Arbroath	Free
(Scotland) Mark Williams	(Scotland) St Mirren	Free
(England) Geoff Mitchell	(England) Histon	Free
(Estonia) Mikk Reintam	(Czech Republic) Frýdek-Místek	Free
(Scotland) Robbie Crawford	(Scotland) Rangers	Loan

=== Players out ===
Player	To	Fee
(Scotland) Daryll Meggatt	(Scotland) Dundee	Free
(Scotland) Liam Buchanan	(Scotland) Livingston	Free
(Scotland) Ben Gordon	(Scotland) Livingston	Free
(Scotland) Ryan McCord	(Scotland) Raith Rovers	Free
(Scotland) Kevin Cawley	(Scotland) Dumbarton	Free
(Scotland) Mark Docherty	(Scotland) Dumbarton	Free
(Scotland) Greig Spence	(Scotland) Cowdenbeath	Free
(Scotland) John Gibson	(Scotland) Clyde	Free
(Scotland) Russell McLean	(Scotland) Heart of Midlothian	Free
(Scotland) Mikey Couser	(Scotland) East Fife	Free
(England) Michael Chopra	Released	Free
(Scotland) Stephen Simmons	Released	Free
(Scotland) Jonathan Tiffoney	(Scotland) Brechin City	Free
(Scotland) Adam Asghar	(Scotland) Annan Athletic	Free
(Scotland) Craig McDowall	Released	Free
(England) Greg Rutherford	(Scotland) Arbroath	Free
(Scotland) David Weatherston	Released	Free
(England) Geoff Mitchell	Released	Free
(Scotland) Omar Kader	(Scotland) Forfar Athletic	Free
(Scotland) Michael Doyle	(Scotland) St Johnstone	Free

== See also ==
- List of Alloa Athletic F.C. seasons
