= Omar Kader =

Scottish footballer (born 1986)

Personal information
- Date of birth: 29 April 1986 (age 40)
- Place of birth: Edinburgh, Scotland
- Height: 5 ft 9 in (1.75 m)
- Position: Midfielder

Senior career*
Years	Team	Apps	(Gls)
2005–2012	Spartans		
2012–2015	Forfar Athletic	91	(10)
2015	Alloa Athletic	1	(0)
2015–2016	Forfar Athletic	14	(2)
2016–2020	Arbroath	107	(12)
- * Club domestic league appearances and goals

Omar Kader (born 29 April 1986) is a Scottish former footballer who played as a midfielder. He began his career at amateurs Spartans, where he spent seven years before moving to the Scottish Football League to represent Forfar Athletic in 2012. He played three seasons at Forfar before leaving to join Alloa Athletic, having impressed their manager while playing against them, but two months later he left to return to Forfar then join Arbroath for four seasons. Kader has since retired as a professional footballer.

== Career ==
=== Spartans ===
Born in Edinburgh, Kader began his career at amateur team Spartans, of the East of Scotland Football League. On 6 January 2006, he was an 80th-minute substitute as they won 3–2 against Scottish Third Division club Queen's Park in the third round of the Scottish Cup. On 5 February, he was again a late substitute in the next round as they achieved a goalless draw with St Mirren, the team then in first place in the First Division. In total, he spent seven years at the City Park club.

=== Forfar Athletic ===
On 25 July 2012, after a successful trial, Kader joined Forfar Athletic. Three days later, he made his debut at Station Park in the first round of the Scottish Challenge Cup, and scored the first goal of a 3–2 win against First Division Dunfermline Athletic, finishing a cross by Danny Denholm. He made his first appearance in the Scottish Football League on 11 August, as the Second Division season began with a 2–0 loss at Queen of the South. Kader did not record a league goal until his 17th game, netting in a 3–1 home win over Stranraer on 2 March 2013, and was also on the scoresheet in his next game two weeks later, when he scored Forfar's first of a 3–3 draw against Stenhousemuir. Across 25 games of his first season in a nationwide league, his only other goal came on 27 April, concluding a 3–0 victory at Stranraer's Stair Park. Forfar finished the season in a play-off place, where they lost 7–4 on aggregate to Dunfermline.

Kader's second season with Forfar began in the Challenge Cup first round on 27 July 2013, with him scoring the first goal of a 2–1 win over East Fife. It took him 18 games to achieve a goal in the newly rebranded Scottish League One, doing so on 1 February 2014 in a 1–1 home draw with Airdrieonians. His season ended with three goals in 30 league games.

In his third season, Kader scored in two consecutive games over November 2014, helping Forfar to a 3–3 draw at Brechin City and a 2–0 home triumph over Ayr United. He featured in all 36 matches over the league season, recording four goals, as Forfar made the promotion play-offs. In the semi-final first leg, he opened the scoring in a 3–0 home victory over Ayr, and in the first leg of the final, he scored the first goal of a 3–1 victory against Alloa Athletic. However, Alloa, who were in the play-offs to maintain their place in the Scottish Championship, came back to defeat Forfar in the second leg.

=== Alloa Athletic ===
After impressing Alloa manager Danny Lennon with his play-off performances against them for Forfar, Kader was one of five players whom he signed on 8 July 2015. He made his debut 17 days later as they won 1–0 away to Highland Football League team Brora Rangers in the first round of the Challenge Cup, replacing Eddie Ferns for the last ten minutes. On 29 August, he made his league debut, as an 82nd-minute substitute for Mark Williams in a 1–0 home loss to Greenock Morton.

=== Return to Forfar ===
Kader left Alloa by mutual consent, and returned to Forfar on 1 September 2015. The first game of his second spell came four days later, a 4–0 loss to Dunfermline Athletic at Station Park. In his next game on 12 September, he scored the first goal of his return to the team, confirming a 2–0 win at Brechin City. In a season which ended with relegation, he added only one more goal, in a 1–1 draw at Airdrieonians on 8 March 2016.

=== Arbroath ===
On 10 May 2016, Kader joined up with former Forfar manager Dick Campbell, being one of four players to sign for Scottish League Two team Arbroath, alongside his Forfar teammates Michael Dunlop and Gavin Malin. The team won promotion at the end of the season as League Two champions.

Arbroath won the League One title in 2019, though Kader scored only once, in a 5–2 home win over Stenhousemuir on 1 December 2018. On 9 November 2019 he scored Arbroath's third goal as they wrapped up a 3–0 win against Inverness Caledonian Thistle at Gayfield Park.

== Personal life ==
Kader grew up supporting hometown team Hibernian. He is a graduate of Heriot-Watt University, and scored as their football team won a fifth consecutive university league title in 2008.

== Career statistics ==
As of match played 4 January 2020

Appearances and goals by club, season and competition
Club	Season	League			Scottish Cup		League Cup		Other		Total	
Club	Season	Division	Apps	Goals	Apps	Goals	Apps	Goals	Apps	Goals	Apps	Goals
Spartans	2005–06	East of Scotland Football League	–		2	0	–		–		2	0
Spartans	2006–07	East of Scotland Football League	–		0	0	–		–		0	0
Spartans	2007–08	East of Scotland Football League	–		1	0	–		–		1	0
Spartans	2008–09	East of Scotland Football League	–		6	1	–		–		6	1
Spartans	2009–10	East of Scotland Football League	–		2	0	–		–		2	0
Spartans	2010–11	East of Scotland Football League	–		2	0	–		–		2	0
Spartans	2011–12	East of Scotland Football League	–		1	0	–		–		1	0
Spartans	Total		–		14	1	–		–		14	1
Forfar Athletic	2012–13	Scottish Second Division	25	3	1	0	1	0	3 (Note: One appearance and a goal in the Scottish Challenge Cup; two appearances in the First Division play-offs)	1	30	4
Forfar Athletic	2013–14	Scottish League One	30	3	2	0	2	0	2 (Note: Appearances in the Scottish Challenge Cup)	1	36	4
Forfar Athletic	2014–15	Scottish League One	36	4	1	0	1	0	5 (Note: One appearance in the Scottish Challenge Cup; four appearances and two goals in the Championship play-offs)	2	43	6
Forfar Athletic	Total		91	10	4	0	4	0	10	4	109	14
Alloa Athletic	2015–16	Scottish Championship	1	0	0	0	1	0	2	0	4	0
Forfar Athletic	2015–16	Scottish League One	14	2	2	0	0	0	0	0	16	2
Arbroath	2016–17	Scottish League Two	33	5	2	0	4	0	1	1	40	6
Arbroath	2017–18	Scottish League One	29	5	2	0	4	0	1	0	36	5
Arbroath	2018–19	Scottish League One	30	1	1	0	4	0	2	0	37	1
Arbroath	2019–20	Scottish Championship	15	1	2	0	4	1	2	0	23	2
Arbroath	Total		107	12	7	0	16	1	6	1	136	14
Career total			213	24	27	1	21	1	18	5	279	31

== Honours ==
Arbroath

- Scottish League Two: 2016–17
- Scottish League One: 2018–19
