= Hoggan (surname) =

People with the surname include:

- David Hoggan (b.1961), Scottish footballer
- David L. Hoggan (1923–1988), American historian
- Dee Hoggan (b. 1990), Scottish bowler
- Frances Hoggan (1843–927), Welsh physician
- James Hoggan (1959–2020), Australian Paralympic athlete
- James Hoggan (b. 1946), Canadian businessman
- Jeff Hoggan (b. 1978), Canadian ice-hockeyer
- Ryan Hoggan (b. 1998), Scottish footballer
