= 2018–19 Alloa Athletic F.C. season =

Alloa Athletic
2018–2019 season
- Manager: Jim Goodwin
- Stadium: Recreation Park, Alloa
- Scottish Championship: 8th
- Challenge Cup: Quarter-final
- League Cup: Group stage
- Scottish Cup: Fourth round

The 2018–19 season is Alloa Athletic's first season back in the Scottish Championship. They also competed in the Challenge Cup, League Cup and the Scottish Cup.

== Competitions ==
=== Scottish Championship ===
==== League table ====
Pos	Team	Pld	W	D	L	GF	GA	GD	Pts	Promotion, qualification or relegation
6	Partick Thistle	36	12	7	17	43	52	−9	43	
7	Dunfermline Athletic	36	11	8	17	33	40	−7	41	
8	Alloa Athletic	36	10	9	17	39	53	−14	39	
9	Queen of the South (O)	36	9	11	16	41	48	−7	38	Qualification for the Championship play-offs
10	Falkirk (R)	36	9	11	16	37	49	−12	38	Relegation to League One

Source: SPFL
Rules for classification: 1) Points; 2) Goal difference; 3) Goals scored; 4) Points in head-to-head matches; 5) Goal difference in hth matches; 6). Goals scored in hth matches; 7). Play-off (only for deciding promotion, play-off participation and relegation).
(O) Play-off winners; (R) Relegated

==== Matches ====
4 August 2018 1	Ross County	1–0	Alloa Athletic	Dingwall
15:00 BST	Fraser 88'	Report		Stadium: Victoria Park; Attendance: 3,065; Referee: Mike Roncone

11 August 2018 2	Alloa Athletic	0–2	Greenock Morton	Alloa
15:00 BST		Report	Millar 15', 81'	Stadium: Recreation Park; Attendance: 836; Referee: Alan Newlands

25 August 2018 3	Inverness Caledonian Thistle	2–2	Alloa Athletic	Inverness
15:00 BST	McKay 10'; Welsh 48' (pen.)	Report	Oakley 33' (o.g.); Karadachki (yellow card) 46' (yellow-red card) 48'; Flannigan 87' (pen.)	Stadium: Caledonian Stadium; Attendance: 2,269; Referee: Barry Cook

1 September 2018 4	Alloa Athletic	1–1	Dundee United	Alloa
15:00 BST	Flannigan 82'	Report	Watson 71'	Stadium: Recreation Park; Attendance: 1,616; Referee: Alan Muir

=== Scottish League Cup ===
==== Group stage ====
Pos	Team	Pld	W	PW	PL	L	GF	GA	GD	Pts	Qualification
1	Ross County (Q)	4	3	0	0	1	6	4	+2	9	Qualification for the Second round
2	Arbroath	4	2	1	0	1	9	6	+3	8	
3	Alloa Athletic	4	2	1	0	1	8	5	+3	8	
4	Dundee United	4	1	0	2	1	6	3	+3	5	
5	Elgin City	4	0	0	0	4	0	11	−11	0	

Rules for classification: 1) goal difference, 2) goals scored, 3) away goals scored, 4) matches won, 5) away matches won, 6) drawing of lots.
(Q) Qualified to the phase indicated

==== Matches ====
17 July 2018 Group A	Alloa Athletic	4–2	Arbroath	Alloa
19:45 BST	Spence 9', 36'; Cawley 10'; Trouten 30'	Report	Wallace 20'; Hester 26'	Stadium: Recreation Park; Attendance: 302; Referee: Craig Napier

21 July 2018 Group A	Dundee United	1–1 (3–4 p)	Alloa Athletic	Dundee
15:00 BST	Frans 24'	Report	Trouten 79' (pen.)	Stadium: Tannadice Park; Attendance: 1,659; Referee: Steven McLean
	Penalties
	Murdoch (penalty missed); Aird (penalty scored); Barton (penalty scored); Glass (penalty scored); McMullan (penalty missed)		(penalty scored) Taggart; (penalty scored) Spence; (penalty scored) Flannigan; (penalty scored) Trouten

24 July 2018 Group A	Elgin City	0–3	Alloa Athletic	Elgin
19:45 BST		Report	Hastie 2', 53'; Trouten 11'	Stadium: Borough Briggs; Attendance: 417; Referee: Scott Millar

28 July 2018 Group A	Alloa Athletic	0–2	Ross County	Alloa
15:00 BST		Report	Morris 59'; Paton 90+2'	Stadium: Recreation Park; Attendance: 431; Referee: Ryan Lee

=== Scottish Challenge Cup ===
14 August 2018 First round	Alloa Athletic	3–1	Stirling Albion	Alloa
19:45 BST	Cawley 40', 45'; Flannigan 46'	Report	Hamilton 55'	Stadium: Recreation Park; Attendance: 332; Referee: David Lowe

8 September 2018 Second round	Dundee United	1–1 (4–5 p)	Alloa Athletic	Dundee
15:00 BST	Smith 15'	Report	Trouten 78' (pen.)	Stadium: Tannadice Park; Attendance: 1,040; Referee: Greg Aitken
	Penalties
	Fyvie (penalty scored); Thomas (penalty missed); Glass (penalty scored); McMullan (penalty scored); Smith (penalty scored)		(penalty scored) Taggart; (penalty scored) Flannigan; (penalty scored) Zanatta; (penalty scored) Trouten; (penalty scored) Graham

13 October 2018 Third round	Dunfermline Athletic	2–2 (4–5 p)	Alloa Athletic	Dunfermline
15:00 BST	L. Longridge 28', 47' (pen.)	Report	Trouten 8', 70'	Stadium: East End Park; Attendance: 1,469; Referee: Nick Walsh
	Penalties
	Craigen (penalty scored); L. Longridge (penalty scored); Hippolyte (penalty scored); Beadling (penalty scored); Connolly (penalty missed)		(penalty scored) Taggart; (penalty scored) Flannigan; (penalty scored) Zanatta; (penalty scored) Trouten; (penalty scored) Graham

17 November 2018 Quarter-Final	Edinburgh City	2–2 (4–3 p)	Alloa Athletic	Edinburgh
15:00 GMT	B. Henderson 45'; Shepherd 57'	Report	Zanatta 2'; Trouten 12'	Stadium: Ainslie Park; Attendance: 478; Referee: Don Robertson
	Penalties
	L. Henderson (penalty scored); Laird (penalty scored); Smith (penalty scored); Thomson (penalty scored)		(penalty missed) Taggart; (penalty scored) Flannigan; (penalty scored) Zanatta; (penalty scored) Trouten; (penalty missed) Graham

=== Scottish Cup ===
24 November 2018 Third round	Alloa Athletic	3–0	Brechin City	Alloa
15:00 GMT	Zanatta 31'; Spence 59'; Trouten 61'	Report		Stadium: Recreation Park; Attendance: 301; Referee: Steven Reid

19 January 2019 Fourth round	St Mirren	3–2	Alloa Athletic	Paisley
15:00 GMT	Cooke 68'; Erhahon 85'; McAllister 87'	Report	Trouten 26'; Cawley 34'	Stadium: St Mirren Park; Attendance: 2,760; Referee: Don Robertson

== Squad statistics ==
=== Appearances ===
No.	Pos	Nat	Player	Total		Championship		League Cup		Challenge Cup		Scottish Cup	
No.	Pos	Nat	Player	Apps	Goals	Apps	Goals	Apps	Goals	Apps	Goals	Apps	Goals
1	GK	(Scotland) SCO	Neil Parry	46	0	36	0	4	0	4	0	2	0
2	DF	(Scotland) SCO	Scott Taggart	46	0	36	0	4	0	4	0	2	0
3	DF	(Scotland) SCO	Liam Dick	43	0	34	0	3	0	4	0	2	0
4	DF	(England) ENG	Sam Roscoe	24	0	23	0	0	0	0	0	1	0
5	DF	(Scotland) SCO	Andy Graham	46	3	36	3	4	0	4	0	2	0
6	MF	(England) ENG	Steven Hetherington	39	1	29+4	1	0+2	0	1+1	0	2	0
7	FW	(Scotland) SCO	Kevin Cawley	44	5	22+12	1	4	1	3+1	2	2	1
8	MF	(Scotland) SCO	Jon Robertson	36	0	22+4	0	2+2	0	4	0	2	0
9	FW	(Scotland) SCO	Greig Spence	20	3	7+6	0	4	2	2	0	1	1
9	FW	(Scotland) SCO	Jack Hamilton	15	1	1+14	1	0	0	0	0	0	0
10	FW	(Scotland) SCO	Alan Trouten	44	19	32+2	10	4	3	3+1	4	2	2
11	MF	(Scotland) SCO	Iain Flannigan	41	8	33	7	3	0	4	1	1	0
12	MF	(Scotland) SCO	Liam Burt	10	0	3+6	0	0	0	0	0	0+1	0
12	FW	(Scotland) SCO	Jack Aitchison	11	1	6+4	1	0	0	0	0	0+1	0
14	MF	(Scotland) SCO	Adam Brown	23	0	2+12	0	3+1	0	2+2	0	0+1	0
15	MF	(Scotland) SCO	Jordan Kirkpatrick	17	3	6+11	3	0	0	0	0	0	0
15	FW	(Scotland) SCO	Jake Hastie	23	3	14+5	1	4	2	0	0	0	0
16	DF	(Bulgaria) BUL	Zdravko Karadachki	9	0	3	0	4	0	0+1	0	0+1	0
17	MF	(Scotland) SCO	Reis Peggie	8	0	0+2	0	1+1	0	4	0	0	0
18	FW	(Tunisia) TUN	Ahmed Aloulou	3	0	0+1	0	0	0	0+2	0	0	0
19	MF	(Canada) CAN	Dario Zanatta	39	8	32+2	6	0	0	3	1	2	1
20	MF	(Republic of Ireland) IRL	Jim Goodwin	0	0	0	0	0	0	0	0	0	0
23	MF	(Scotland) SCO	Connor Shields	34	3	19+11	3	0	0	2	0	1+1	0
31	GK	(Scotland) SCO	Chris Henry	0	0	0	0	0	0	0	0	0	0
