= Iain Flannigan =

Scottish footballer (born 1988)

Personal information
- Date of birth: 15 January 1988 (age 38)
- Place of birth: Glasgow, Scotland
- Height: 1.80 m (5 ft 11 in)
- Position: Midfielder

Senior career*
Years	Team	Apps	(Gls)
2005–2010	Kilmarnock	25	(1)
2010–2012	Partick Thistle	40	(4)
2012	Greenock Morton	4	(0)
2013	Falkirk	3	(0)
2013–2020	Alloa Athletic	159	(28)
- * Club domestic league appearances and goals

Iain Flannigan (born 15 January 1988) is a Scottish former professional footballer.

Flannigan previously played for Kilmarnock and then went on to play for Partick Thistle, Greenock Morton and Falkirk, before a lengthy stint with Alloa Athletic.

== Career ==
Flannigan started his career at Kilmarnock and debuted on 25 September 2007, as a first-half substitute in a 2–0 defeat to Hamilton Academical in the third round of the Scottish League Cup. On 6 October 2007, Flannigan's Scottish Premier League debut was as a 19 year old in a 2–2 draw versus Inverness Caledonian Thistle.

On 22 March 2008, Flannigan scored his first goal for the club in a 4–1 home victory versus Inverness Caledonian Thistle. He was influential in Killie's equaliser by hitting the post with a free kick before the rebound was scored by team-mate Frazer Wright and he then scored the fourth goal of the match when a low cross was perfectly met by him after a surging run into the penalty box.

On 28 July 2010, after being on trial for a few weeks, Flannigan signed for Partick Thistle. On 31 January 2012, he departed the club.

In March 2012, Flannigan went on trial with Greenock Morton and debuted in a draw versus Ross County. He signed until the end of the season towards the end of March 2012. During this period Flannigan sustained an elbow injury that required surgery and he departed the club at the end of his contract.

On 20 November 2012, Flannigan then went on trial at Falkirk and played in an under 20's match versus Hibernian. On 22 February 2013, following his successful trial, Flannigan signed for the Bairns. On 7 May 2013, after only three appearances, he departed the club, along with another four players.

On 5 July 2013, Flannigan signed for Scottish Championship club Alloa Athletic.

On 20 June 2020, Alloa announced on their website that Flannigan had retired from playing football.

== Career statistics ==
As of match played 18 January 2020

Appearances and goals by club, season and competition
Club	Season	League			Scottish Cup		League Cup		Other		Total	
Club	Season	Division	Apps	Goals	Apps	Goals	Apps	Goals	Apps	Goals	Apps	Goals
Kilmarnock	2007–08	Scottish Premier League	8	1	0	0	1	0	—		9	1
Kilmarnock	2008–09	Scottish Premier League	7	0	2	0	0	0	—		9	0
Kilmarnock	2009–10	Scottish Premier League	7	0	0	0	0	0	—		7	0
Kilmarnock	Total		22	1	2	0	1	0	0	0	25	1
Partick Thistle	2010–11	First Division	29	4	2	0	2	0	3 (Note: Appearances in the Scottish Challenge Cup)	0	36	4
Partick Thistle	2011–12	First Division	5	0	1	0	1	0	2	0	9	0
Partick Thistle	Total		34	4	3	0	3	0	5	0	45	4
Greenock Morton	2011–12	First Division	4	0	0	0	0	0	0	0	4	0
Falkirk (loan)	2012–13	First Division	3	0	0	0	0	0	0	0	3	0
Alloa Athletic	2013–14	Scottish Championship	12	0	1	0	0	0	0	0	13	0
Alloa Athletic	2014–15	Scottish Championship	11	3	0	0	2	0	7 (Note: Three appearances in the Scottish Challenge Cup and four in the Championship play-offs)	0	20	3
Alloa Athletic	2015–16	Scottish Championship	23	3	1	0	1	2	1	0	26	5
Alloa Athletic	2016–17	Scottish League One	28	8	2	0	6	0	6 (Note: Two appearances in the Scottish Challenge Cup and four in the Championship play-offs)	0	42	8
Alloa Athletic	2017–18	Scottish League One	34	6	2	0	4	1	6 (Note: Two appearances and one goal in the Scottish Challenge Cup and four appearances and one goal in the Championship play-offs)	2	46	9
Alloa Athletic	2018–19	Scottish Championship	33	7	1	0	3	0	4	1	41	8
Alloa Athletic	2019–20	Scottish Championship	18	1	2	0	4	0	2	0	26	1
Alloa Athletic	Total		159	28	9	0	20	3	26	3	214	34
Career total			222	33	14	0	24	3	31	3	291	39
