= Scott Taggart =

Scottish footballer

Personal information
- Date of birth: 27 December 1991 (age 34)
- Place of birth: Kilsyth, Scotland
- Height: 6 ft 1 in (1.85 m)
- Positions: Defender; midfielder

Team information
- Current team: Alloa Athletic
- Number: 2

Youth career
- –2010: Hibernian

Senior career*
Years	Team	Apps	(Gls)
2010–2012	Hibernian	3	(0)
2010	→ Ayr United (loan)	6	(0)
2011	→ Stranraer (loan)	10	(1)
2012	→ Stranraer (loan)	14	(1)
2012–2014	Greenock Morton	62	(2)
2014–2016	Dumbarton	46	(2)
2016–	Alloa Athletic	322	(22)
- * Club domestic league appearances and goals as of 4 May 2026

Scott Taggart (born 27 December 1991) is a Scottish footballer who plays for Alloa Athletic. Taggart can play as either a defender or a midfielder. He holds the record for most appearances the SPFL, with 408 appearances as of October 2026.

Taggart has previously played for Hibernian, Greenock Morton and Dumbarton, as well as Ayr United and Stranraer on loan.

== Career ==
Taggart was signed by Hibernian after impressing in a match against their youth team. He was part of the Hibs youth team that won a league and cup double in 2008–09. Taggart went out on loan to Ayr United during the 2010–11 season. He made six league appearances for the Scottish Second Division side. He made his first team debut for Hibs on 7 May 2011, as a substitute against Hamilton.

In September 2011, Taggart went on a three-month loan to Scottish Third Division side Stranraer. He made his debut on 26 September, in their 1–0 victory against Elgin City. He scored his first senior goal on 10 December 2011, in a 6–0 win for Stranraer against East Stirlingshire. His loan spell ended on 23 December and he returned to Hibs, but he was again loaned to Stranraer in January 2012. Taggart scored for Stranraer in the first appearance of his second spell with them, in a 5–2 win against Elgin City on 28 January. He returned to Hibs at the end of this second loan, but was released at the end of his contract in May 2012.

Taggart signed for Greenock Morton in July 2012. He played regularly as Morton performed well during the 2012–13 Scottish First Division. Taggart left Morton after rejecting a new deal in June 2014.

On 21 June 2014, Taggart signed for Dumbarton. He made his league debut in a 4–1 defeat to Rangers at Ibrox and scored his first goal for the club in a 3–3 draw with Falkirk in January 2015.

After two seasons with the side Taggart left Dumbarton in May 2016, signing for Scottish League One side Alloa Athletic shortly after.

In the 2024-25 season Taggart currently has 6 goals and 5 assists to his name, and is sponsored by Ben Woodruff (Home) and The Jolly Boys (Away).

== Career statistics ==
As of match played 30 April 2021

Appearances and goals by club, season and competition
Club	Season	League			Scottish Cup		League Cup		Other		Total	
Club	Season	Division	Apps	Goals	Apps	Goals	Apps	Goals	Apps	Goals	Apps	Goals
Hibernian	2010–11	Scottish Premier League	3	0	0	0	0	0	0	0	3	0
Hibernian	2011–12	Scottish Premier League	0	0	0	0	0	0	0	0	0	0
Hibernian	Total		3	0	0	0	0	0	0	0	3	0
Ayr United (loan)	2010–11	Scottish Second Division	6	0	0	0	1	0	1	0	8	0
Stranraer (loan)	2011–12	Scottish Third Division	24	2	3	0	0	0	4 (Note: Appearances in the Second Division play-offs)	0	31	2
Greenock Morton	2012–13	Scottish First Division	33	2	5	0	2	0	2 (Note: Appearances in the Scottish Challenge Cup)	0	42	2
Greenock Morton	2013–14	Scottish Championship	29	0	1	0	3	0	1	0	34	0
Greenock Morton	Total		62	2	6	0	5	0	3	0	76	4
Dumbarton	2014–15	Scottish Championship	33	2	0	0	1	0	1	0	35	2
Dumbarton	2015–16	Scottish Championship	13	0	3	0	1	0	2	0	19	0
Dumbarton	Total		46	2	3	0	2	0	3	0	54	2
Alloa Athletic	2016–17	Scottish League One	36	3	2	0	5	0	7 (Note: Three appearances in the Scottish Challenge Cup and four in the Championship play-offs)	0	50	3
Alloa Athletic	2017–18	Scottish League One	35	3	1	0	4	0	6 (Note: Two appearances in the Scottish Challenge Cup and four in the Championship play-offs)	0	46	3
Alloa Athletic	2018–19	Scottish Championship	36	0	2	0	4	0	4	0	46	0
Alloa Athletic	2019–20	Scottish Championship	28	0	2	1	4	0	2	0	36	1
Alloa Athletic	2020–21	Scottish Championship	21	0	0	0	4	0	—		25	0
Alloa Athletic	Total		156	6	7	1	21	0	19	0	203	7
Career total			297	12	19	1	29	0	30	0	376	13

== Honours ==
=== Club ===
Morton

- Scottish Football League First Division: Runners-Up 2012–13

=== Individual ===
- PFA Scotland League One Team of the Year: 2017–18
