= 2012–13 Alloa Athletic F.C. season =

Alloa Athletic
2012–13 season
- Chairman: Mike Mulraney
- Manager: Paul Hartley
- Stadium: Recreation Park
- Second Division: Second place
- Challenge Cup: First round, lost to Cowdenbeath
- League Cup: First round, lost to Queen of the South
- Scottish Cup: Third round, lost to Rangers
- Top goalscorer: League: Kevin Cawley (13); All: Kevin Cawley (14)
- Highest home attendance: 2,765 vs Dunfermline Athletic First Division play-offs 15 May 2013
- Lowest home attendance: 382 vs Brechin City; Second Division; 16 March 2013

The 2012–13 season was Alloa Athletic's first season back in the Scottish Second Division, having been promoted from the Scottish Third Division at the end of season 2011–12. Alloa also competed in the Challenge Cup, Scottish League Cup and the Scottish Cup.

== Summary ==
=== Season ===
Alloa finished second in the Scottish Second Division, entering the play-offs defeating Dunfermline Athletic 3–1 on aggregate in the final and were promoted to the Scottish First Division. They reached the first round of the Challenge Cup, the first round of the League Cup and the third round of the Scottish Cup.

== Results & fixtures ==
Win Draw Loss Postponed

=== Preseason ===
10 July 2012 Friendly	Alloa Athletic	1–2	Partick Thistle	Recreation Park
19:45	Munn 61'	Partick Thistle Report	Lawless 26'; Sinclair 50'	Referee: John McKendrick

17 July 2012 Friendly	Alloa Athletic	2–1	Falkirk	Recreation Park
19:30	Cawley 61'; Ry.McCord 81'	Falkirk FC Report	Small 73'	Referee: Craig Charleston

24 July 2012 Friendly	Alloa Athletic	0–2	Dundee United	Recreation Park
19:45		Report; Record Report	Russell 21', 75'	Attendance: 413; Referee: Muir

=== Scottish Second Division ===
11 August 2012 Scottish Second Division	Alloa Athletic	1–1	East Fife	Recreation Park
15:00	Simmons 74'	SFL Report	McCormack 30'	Attendance: 625; Referee: McDermott

18 August 2012 Scottish Second Division	Albion Rovers	0–3	Alloa Athletic	Cliftonhill Stadium
15:00		SFL Report	Grehan 14'; Thomson 79', 83'	Attendance: 393; Referee: Hilland

25 August 2012 Scottish Second Division	Alloa Athletic	2–3	Arbroath	Recreation Park
15:00	Cawley 18', 32'	SFL Report	Holmes 45'; Currie 54'; Travis 63'; Rennie (red card) 64'	Attendance: 575; Referee: Salmond

1 September 2012 Scottish Second Division	Brechin City	1–3	Alloa Athletic	Glebe Park
15:00	Jackson 51'	SFL Report	Thomson 65'; Cawley 74'; Grehan 88'	Attendance: 491; Referee: Northcroft

15 September 2012 Scottish Second Division	Alloa Athletic	0–2	Stenhousemuir	Recreation Park
15:00		SFL Report	Smith 67'; Ferguson 91' (pen.)	Attendance: 509; Referee: Cook

22 September 2012 Scottish Second Division	Alloa Athletic	3–0	Stranraer	Recreation Park
15:00	Cawley 21'; Grehan 45+3' (pen.); Holmes 90'	SFL Report	Mitchell (red card) 45'	Attendance: 429; Referee: Anderson

29 September 2012 Scottish Second Division	Queen of the South	1–0	Alloa Athletic	Palmerston Park
15:00	Clark 67'	SFL Report		Attendance: 1,573; Referee: Beaton

6 October 2012 Scottish Second Division	Forfar Athletic	2–3	Alloa Athletic	Station Park
15:00	Denholm 8', 79'	SFL Report	McCord 7' (pen.); Marr 22'; Gordon 83'	Attendance: 487; Referee: McKendrick

20 October 2012 Scottish Second Division	Alloa Athletic	1–0	Ayr United	Recreation Park
15:00	Gordon 45'	SFL Report		Attendance: 595; Referee: Robertson

27 October 2012 Scottish Second Division	Alloa Athletic	5–1	Albion Rovers	Recreation Park
15:00	Grehan 20', 57', 64'; Marriott 42'; Megginson 82'	SFL Report	Crawford 48'	Attendance: 467; Referee: Northcroft

10 November 2012 Scottish Second Division	East Fife	0–1	Alloa Athletic	Bayview Stadium
15:00		SFL Report	Holmes 32'	Attendance: 515; Referee: Somers

17 November 2012 Scottish Second Division	Alloa Athletic	2–2	Brechin City	Recreation Park
15:00	Cawley 43'; Grehan 62'	SFL Report	Brown 69'; Jackson 83'	Attendance: 501; Referee: Robertson

24 November 2012 Scottish Second Division	Stenhousemuir	0–2	Alloa Athletic	Ochilview Park
15:00		SFL Report	Cawley 24'; Simmons 36'	Attendance: 671; Referee: Graham

8 December 2012 Scottish Second Division	Alloa Athletic	P–P	Queen of the South	Recreation Park
15:00		BBC Report

11 December 2012 Scottish Second Division	Alloa Athletic	1–0	Queen of the South	Recreation Park
19:30	McCord 58' (pen.)	BBC Sport		Attendance: 475; Referee: Colvin

15 December 2012 Scottish Second Division	Stranraer	3–2	Alloa Athletic	Stair Park
15:00	Dunlop 44'; Malcolm 56'; Love 79'	SFL Report	Holmes 61'; Thomson 81'	Attendance: 245; Referee: McKendrick

22 December 2012 Scottish Second Division	Alloa Athletic	2–1	Forfar Athletic	Recreation Park
15:00	McCord 4', 20'; Holmes (red card) 90'	SFL Report	Templeman 36'; Tulloch (red card) 90'	Attendance: 401; Referee: Dallas

29 December 2012 Scottish Second Division	Ayr United	0–0	Alloa Athletic	Somerset Park
15:00		SFL Report		Attendance: 927; Referee: Robertson

2 January 2013 Scottish Second Division	Alloa Athletic	1–0	Stenhousemuir	Recreation Park
15:00	McCord 17'	SFL Report		Attendance: 603; Referee: Hilland

5 January 2013 Scottish Second Division	Brechin City	3–2	Alloa Athletic	Glebe Park
15:00	McKenna 4'; Trouten 50'; Jackson 83'	SFL Report	Cawley 17'; McCord 38' (pen.)	Attendance: 602; Referee: Anderson

12 January 2013 Scottish Second Division	Arbroath	P–P	Alloa Athletic	Gayfield Park
15:00		BBC Report
Note: Postponed due to waterlogged pitch

19 January 2013 Scottish Second Division	Alloa Athletic	1–1	East Fife	Recreation Park
15:00	Marr 34'	SFL Report	McManus 23'	Attendance: 551; Referee: Northcroft

26 January 2013 Scottish Second Division	Alloa Athletic	4–1	Stranraer	Recreation Park
15:00	McCord 32'; Megginson 60'; Holmes 67', 73'	SFL Report	Gallagher 59'	Attendance: 451; Referee: Graham

2 February 2013 Scottish Second Division	Queen of the South	0–0	Alloa Athletic	Palmerston Park
15:00		SFL Report		Attendance: 1,738; Referee: Allan

9 February 2013 Scottish Second Division	Alloa Athletic	2–2	Ayr United	Recreation Park
15:00	Megginson 63'; Gordon 90+2'	SFL Report	Buchanan 36'; McGregor 57'; Buchanan (yellow card) 78' (yellow-red card)	Attendance: 521; Referee: Cook

16 February 2013 Scottish Second Division	Forfar Athletic	0–1	Alloa Athletic	Station Park
15:00		SFL Report	Gordon 89'	Attendance: 511; Referee: Aitken

23 February 2013 Scottish Second Division	Alloa Athletic	0–1	Arbroath	Recreation Park
15:00		SFL Report	Holmes 41'	Attendance: 451; Referee: Finnie

27 February 2013 Scottish Second Division	Arbroath	1–2	Alloa Athletic	Gayfield Park
19:45	Malcolm 64'	SFL Report	McCord 19' (pen.); Cawley 89'	Attendance: 471; Referee: Somers

2 March 2013 Scottish Second Division	Albion Rovers	1–5	Alloa Athletic	Cliftonhill Stadium
15:00	Andrews 45'	SFL Report	Grehan 9'; Elliot 31', 39'; Holmes 78'; Cawley 85'	Attendance: 319; Referee: Hilland

9 March 2013 Scottish Second Division	Stenhousemuir	1–1	Alloa Athletic	Ochilview Park
15:00	Smith 69'	SFL Report	McCord 22' (pen.)	Attendance: 513; Referee: Aitken

16 March 2013 Scottish Second Division	Alloa Athletic	0–1	Brechin City	Recreation Park
15:00		SFL Report	Trouten 53'	Attendance: 382; Referee: Anderson

23 March 2013 Scottish Second Division	Alloa Athletic	1–2	Queen of the South	Recreation Park
15:00	Cawley 56'	SFL Report	Clark 40'; McGuffie 85' (pen.)	Attendance: 647; Referee: Dallas

30 March 2013 Scottish Second Division	Stranraer	1–2	Alloa Athletic	Stair Park
15:00	Love 87'	SFL Report	Holmes 55'; McCord 68'	Attendance: 322; Referee: Roache

6 April 2013 Scottish Second Division	Ayr United	0–2	Alloa Athletic	Somerset Park
15:00		SFL Report	McCord 27'; Holmes 90'	Attendance: 898; Referee: McLean

13 April 2013 Scottish Second Division	Alloa Athletic	1–0	Forfar Athletic	Recreation Park
15:00	Cawley 46'	SFL Report		Attendance: 507; Referee: Muir

20 April 2013 Scottish Second Division	East Fife	2–1	Alloa Athletic	Bayview Stadium
15:00	Barr 39'; Willis 56'	SFL Report	Tiffoney 84'	Attendance: 497; Referee: Colvin

27 April 2013 Scottish Second Division	Alloa Athletic	4–1	Albion Rovers	Recreation Park
15:00	Cawley 4', 86'; Simmons 22'; Tiffoney 31'	SFL Report	Walker 18'	Attendance: 1,224; Referee: Anderson

4 May 2013 Scottish Second Division	Arbroath	0–1	Alloa Athletic	Gayfield Park
15:00		SFL Report	Hynd 89'	Attendance: 901; Referee: Robertson

=== First Division play-offs ===
8 May 2012 Play-offs SF R1	Brechin City	0–2	Alloa Athletic	Glebe Park
19:45		SFL Report	McCord 40'; Moon 56'	Attendance: 582; Referee: Madden

11 May 2012 Play-offs SF R2	Alloa Athletic	2–3 (4–3 agg.)	Brechin City	Recreation Park
15:00	Cawley 36'; Elliot 68' (pen.)	SFL Report	Jackson 4', 90+4'; Trouten 52' (pen.)	Attendance: 856; Referee: Collum

15 May 2013 Play-offs Final R1	Alloa Athletic	3–0	Dunfermline Athletic	Recreation Park
19:45	Tiffoney 27'; Elliot 45+2'; Moon 90+2'	SFL Report		Attendance: 2,765; Referee: McLean

19 May 2013 Play-offs Final R2	Dunfermline Athletic	1–0 (1–3 agg.)	Alloa Athletic	East End Park
16:05	Smith 73'; Husband (red card) 75'	SFL Report		Attendance: 5,110; Referee: Thomson

=== Scottish Challenge Cup ===
28 July 2012 Scottish Challenge Cup round 1	Cowdenbeath	1–1 (a.e.t.) (3–1 p)	Alloa Athletic	Central Park
15:00	Coult 2'	BBC Report	Gordon 20'	Attendance: 323; Referee: Madden
	Penalties
	Coult (penalty missed); McKenzie (penalty scored); Ramsay (penalty scored); Stevenson (penalty scored)		McCord (penalty missed); Grehan (penalty missed); Holmes (penalty scored); Docherty (penalty missed)

=== Scottish League Cup ===
4 August 2012 Scottish League Cup round 1	Queen of the South	5–2	Alloa Athletic	Palmerston Park
15:00	Mitchell 9'; Higgins 67'; Clark 83', 85'; Lyle 89'	SFL Report	Gordon 64'; Grehan 78'	Attendance: 967; Referee: Colvin

=== Scottish Cup ===
3 November 2012 Scottish Cup round 3	Rangers	7–0	Alloa Athletic	Ibrox Stadium
15:00	Shiels 2', 21'; McCulloch 33', 72'; Crawford 73'; McKay 82', 89'	BBC Report	Doyle (red card) 78'	Attendance: 25,478; Referee: Brines

== Player statistics ==
=== Captains ===
No.	P	Name	Country	No. games	Notes
	MF	Young	(Scotland)	22	Club captain

Last updated: 19 May 2013
Source: Competitive match reports.
Competitive matches only
Matches started as captain only
Country: FIFA nationality; No.: Squad number; P: Position; Name: Player name; No. Games: Number of games started as captain.

=== Squad ===
Last updated 16 May 2013

No.	Pos	Nat	Player	Total		Second Division		Other^{[a]}		League Cup		Scottish Cup	
No.	Pos	Nat	Player	Apps	Goals	Apps	Goals	Apps	Goals	Apps	Goals	Apps	Goals
	GK	(Scotland) SCO	Scott Bain	42	0	35+0	0	5+0	0	1+0	0	1+0	0
	GK	(Scotland) SCO	Craig McDowall	1	0	1+0	0	0+0	0	0+0	0	0+0	0
	GK	(Scotland) SCO	Mickey Couser	0	0	0+0	0	0+0	0	0+0	0	0+0	0
	DF	(Scotland) SCO	Mark Docherty	33	0	17+11	0	1+2	0	1+0	0	0+1	0
	DF	(Scotland) SCO	Michael Doyle (Note: Players Name is James Michael Doyle, Some match reports refer to Michael Doyle others James Doyle)	34	0	27+0	0	5+0	0	1+0	0	1+0	0
	DF	(Scotland) SCO	Ben Gordon	40	6	33+0	4	5+0	1	1+0	1	1+0	0
	DF	(Scotland) SCO	Ryan Harding	2	0	0+0	0	1+0	0	1+0	0	0+0	0
	DF	(Scotland) SCO	Jason Marr	35	2	32+0	2	2+0	0	0+0	0	1+0	0
	DF	(Scotland) SCO	Mark McCullagh	0	0	0+0	0	0+0	0	0+0	0	0+0	0
	DF	(Scotland) SCO	Lee McLelland	1	0	0+1	0	0+0	0	0+0	0	0+0	0
	DF	(Scotland) SCO	Darryl Meggatt	35	0	30+0	0	4+0	0	0+0	0	1+0	0
	DF	(Scotland) SCO	Jonathan Tiffoney	9	3	6+1	2	2+0	1	0+0	0	0+0	0
	MF	(Scotland) SCO	Edward Ferns	21	0	3+17	0	0+1	0	0+0	0	0+0	0
	MF	(Scotland) SCO	Paul Hartley	0	0	0+0	0	0+0	0	0+0	0	0+0	0
	MF	(Scotland) SCO	Graeme Holmes	40	8	31+2	8	5+0	0	1+0	0	1+0	0
	MF	(Scotland) SCO	Nicholas Locke	0	0	0+0	0	0+0	0	0+0	0	0+0	0
	MF	(Scotland) SCO	Nicky Low	11	0	9+1	0	0+0	0	0+0	0	1+0	0
	MF	(Scotland) SCO	Ross McCord	17	0	3+12	0	0+1	0	0+1	0	0+0	0
	MF	(Scotland) SCO	Ryan McCord	38	12	30+1	11	5+0	1	1+0	0	1+0	0
	MF	(Scotland) SCO	Kevin Moon	15	2	11+0	0	4+0	2	0+0	0	0+0	0
	MF	(Scotland) SCO	Blair Munn	0	0	0+0	0	0+0	0	0+0	0	0+0	0
	MF	(Scotland) SCO	Stephen Simmons	37	3	29+2	3	4+0	0	1+0	0	1+0	0
	MF	(Scotland) SCO	Gavin Stokes	3	0	1+2	0	0+0	0	0+0	0	0+0	0
	MF	(Scotland) SCO	Callum Tapping	4	0	1+3	0	0+0	0	0+0	0	0+0	0
	MF	(Scotland) SCO	Darren Young	28	0	20+1	0	1+4	0	1+0	0	1+0	0
	FW	(Scotland) SCO	Lewis Bonar	3	0	0+3	0	0+0	0	0+0	0	0+0	0
	FW	(Scotland) SCO	Kevin Cawley	41	14	25+9	13	5+0	1	0+1	0	1+0	0
	FW	(Scotland) SCO	David Cox	4	0	2+0	0	1+0	0	1+0	0	0+0	0
	FW	(Scotland) SCO	Calum Elliot	14	4	10+0	2	4+0	2	0+0	0	0+0	0
	FW	(Scotland) SCO	Calum Gallagher	9	0	5+4	0	0+0	0	0+0	0	0+0	0
	FW	(Scotland) SCO	Martin Grehan	35	9	21+10	8	1+1	0	1+0	1	0+1	0
	FW	(Scotland) SCO	Mitchel Megginson	12	3	10+2	3	0+0	0	0+0	0	0+0	0
	FW	(Scotland) SCO	Robert Thomson	15	4	4+10	4	0+0	0	0+0	0	0+1	0
		(Scotland) SCO	Michael Hardie	1	0	0+1	0	0+0	0	0+0	0	0+0	0
		(Scotland) SCO	Scott Hynd	2	1	0+2	1	0+0	0	0+0	0	0+0	0

a. Includes other competitive competitions, including the play-offs and the Challenge Cup.

=== Disciplinary record ===
Includes all competitive matches.

Last updated 19 May 2013

Nation	Position	Name	Second Division		Other		League Cup		Scottish Cup		Total	
Nation	Position	Name	Booked	Sent off (straight red)	Booked	Sent off (straight red)	Booked	Sent off (straight red)	Booked	Sent off (straight red)	Booked	Sent off (straight red)
(Scotland)	GK	Scott Bain	0	0	0	0	0	0	0	0	0	0
(Scotland)	GK	Craig McDowall	0	0	0	0	0	0	0	0	0	0
(Scotland)	DF	Mark Docherty	4	0	0	0	1	0	0	0	5	0
(Scotland)	DF	Michael Doyle	1	0	0	0	0	0	0	1	1	1
(Scotland)	DF	Ben Gordon	7	0	1	0	0	0	1	0	9	0
(Scotland)	DF	Ryan Harding	0	0	0	0	0	0	0	0	0	0
(Scotland)	DF	Jason Marr	3	0	1	0	0	0	0	0	4	0
(Scotland)	DF	Mark McCullagh	0	0	0	0	0	0	0	0	0	0
(Scotland)	DF	Lee McLelland	0	0	0	0	0	0	0	0	0	0
(Scotland)	DF	Darryl Meggatt	2	0	1	0	0	0	0	0	3	0
(Scotland)	DF	Jonathan Tiffoney	2	0	1	0	0	0	0	0	3	0
(Scotland)	MF	Edward Ferns	2	0	0	0	0	0	0	0	2	0
(Scotland)	MF	Paul Hartley	0	0	0	0	0	0	0	0	0	0
(Scotland)	MF	Graeme Holmes	3	1	1	0	0	0	0	0	4	1
(Scotland)	MF	Nicholas Locke	0	0	0	0	0	0	0	0	0	0
(Scotland)	MF	Nicky Low	2	0	0	0	0	0	0	0	2	0
(Scotland)	MF	Ross McCord	3	0	0	0	0	0	0	0	3	0
(Scotland)	MF	Ryan McCord	8	0	1	0	1	0	0	0	10	0
(Scotland)	MF	Kevin Moon	0	0	0	0	0	0	0	0	0	0
(Scotland)	MF	Blair Munn	0	0	0	0	0	0	0	0	0	0
(Scotland)	MF	Stephen Simmons	9	0	0	0	0	0	0	0	9	0
(Scotland)	MF	Gavin Stokes	1	0	0	0	0	0	0	0	1	0
(Scotland)	MF	Callum Tapping	0	0	0	0	0	0	0	0	0	0
(Scotland)	MF	Darren Young	3	0	0	0	1	0	0	0	4	0
(Scotland)	FW	Lewis Bonar	0	0	0	0	0	0	0	0	0	0
(Scotland)	FW	Craig Campbell	0	0	0	0	0	0	0	0	0	0
(Scotland)	FW	Kevin Cawley	2	0	0	0	0	0	0	0	2	0
(Scotland)	FW	David Cox	0	0	0	0	0	0	0	0	0	0
(Scotland)	FW	Calum Elliot	0	0	0	0	0	0	0	0	0	0
(Scotland)	FW	Calum Gallagher	2	0	0	0	0	0	0	0	2	0
(Scotland)	FW	Martin Grehan	2	0	0	0	0	0	0	0	2	0
(Scotland)	FW	Mitchel Megginson	0	0	0	0	0	0	0	0	0	0
(Scotland)	FW	Kenny O'Brien	0	0	0	0	0	0	0	0	0	0
(Scotland)	FW	Robert Thomson	0	0	0	0	0	0	0	0	0	0
(Scotland)		Michael Hardie	0	0	0	0	0	0	0	0	0	0
(Scotland)		Scott Hynd	0	0	0	0	0	0	0	0	0	0

== Team statistics ==
=== League table ===
Pos	Team	Pld	W	D	L	GF	GA	GD	Pts	Promotion, qualification or relegation
1	Queen of the South (C, P)	36	29	5	2	92	23	+69	92	Promotion to the Championship
2	Alloa Athletic (O, P)	36	20	7	9	62	35	+27	67	Qualification for the First Division play-offs
3	Brechin City	36	19	4	13	72	59	+13	61	Qualification for the First Division play-offs
4	Forfar Athletic	36	17	3	16	67	74	−7	54	Qualification for the First Division play-offs
5	Arbroath	36	15	7	14	47	57	−10	52	

Source: SPFL Archive
Rules for classification: 1) points; 2) goal difference; 3) number of goals scored.
(C) Champions; (O) Play-off winners; (P) Promoted

=== Division summary ===
Round	1	2	3	4	5	6	7	8	9	10	11	12	13	14	15	16	17	18	19	20	21	22	23	24	25	26	27	28	29	30	31	32	33	34	35	36
Ground	H	A	H	A	H	H	A	A	H	H	A	H	A	H	A	H	A	H	A	H	H	A	H	A	H	A	A	A	H	H	A	A	H	A	H	A
Result	D	W	L	W	L	W	L	W	W	W	W	D	W	W	L	W	D	W	L	D	W	D	D	W	L	W	W	D	L	L	W	W	W	L	W	W
Position	3	1	6	3	5	4	4	4	3	2	2	2	2	2	2	2	2	2	2	2	2	2	2	2	2	2	2	2	2	2	2	2	2	2	2	2

Updated to match(es) played on 19 May 2013. Source:
A = Away; H = Home; W = Win; D = Draw; L = Loss

== Transfers ==
=== Players in ===
Player	To	Fee
(Scotland) David Cox	(Scotland) Annan Athletic	Free
(Scotland) Darryl Meggatt	(Scotland) Queen's Park	Free
(Scotland) Martin Grehan	(Scotland) Stranraer	Free
(Scotland) Stephen Simmons	(Scotland) Queen of the South	Free
(Scotland) Blair Munn	(Scotland) Falkirk	Free
(Scotland) Robert Thomson	(Scotland) Dundee United	Loan
(Scotland) Edward Ferns	(Scotland) Drumchapel United	Free
(Scotland) Mitchel Megginson	(Scotland) Aberdeen	Loan
(Scotland) Nicky Low	(Scotland) Aberdeen	Loan
(Scotland) Callum Tapping	(Scotland) Heart of Midlothian	Loan
(Scotland) Gavin Stokes	(Scotland) Knightswood Juveniles	Free
(Scotland) Calum Gallagher	(Scotland) Rangers	Loan
(Scotland) Mitchel Megginson	(Scotland) Aberdeen	Loan
(Scotland) Jonathan Tiffoney	(Scotland) Ayr United	Free
(Scotland) Kevin Moon	(Scotland) St Johnstone	Free
(Scotland) Calum Elliot	(Lithuania) Zalgiris Vilnius	Free
(Scotland) Jonathan Tiffoney	(Republic of Ireland) Limerick	Free

=== Players out ===
Player	To	Fee
(Scotland) Robbie Winters	(Scotland) Peterhead	Free
(Scotland) Ross Philp	(Scotland) Kelty Hearts	Free
(Scotland) Max Wright	(Scotland) Stranraer	Free
(Scotland) Steven Masterton	(Scotland) Clyde	Free
(Scotland) Ryan Harding	(Scotland) Peterhead	Loan
(Scotland) David Cox	(Scotland) Peterhead	Loan
(Scotland) Nicky Locke	(Scotland) Sauchie	Loan
(Scotland) Ryan Miller	(Scotland) Sauchie	Loan
(Scotland) Blair Munn	(Scotland) Sauchie	Loan
(Scotland) David Cox	(Scotland) Peterhead	Free
(Scotland) Jonathan Tiffoney	(Republic of Ireland) Limerick	Free
