= 2013–14 Alloa Athletic F.C. season =

Alloa Athletic
- Scottish Championship: 8th
- Scottish Cup: Third round
- Scottish League Cup: Second round

The 2013–14 season saw Alloa Athletic compete in the Scottish Championship where they finished in 8th position with 40 points.

== Results ==
Alloa Athletic's score comes first

=== Legend ===
| Win | Draw | Loss |

=== Scottish Championship ===
| Match | Date | Opponent | Venue | Result | Attendance | Scorers |
|---|---|---|---|---|---|---|
| 1 | 10 August 2013 | Livingston | H | 1–0 | 714 | Simmons 42' |
| 2 | 17 August 2013 | Dundee | A | 0–1 | 4,167 | |
| 3 | 24 August 2013 | Cowdenbeath | H | 3–1 | 611 | Gordon 50', Kirk 79', Ferns 89' |
| 4 | 31 August 2013 | Queen of the South | A | 0–0 | 1,607 | |
| 5 | 14 September 2013 | Dumbarton | H | 1–2 | 629 | Simmons 54' |
| 6 | 21 September 2013 | Raith Rovers | A | 2–4 | 1,397 | Cawley 16', McCord 62' |
| 7 | 28 September 2013 | Hamilton Academical | H | 1–0 | 653 | McCord 45' |
| 8 | 5 October 2013 | Greenock Morton | A | 2–0 | 1,478 | Holmes 41', Kirk 48' |
| 9 | 12 October 2013 | Falkirk | H | 0–0 | 1,625 | |
| 10 | 19 October 2013 | Livingston | A | 2–3 | 869 | Cawley 8', Gordon 87' |
| 11 | 26 October 2013 | Queen of the South | H | 0–3 | 724 | |
| 12 | 9 November 2013 | Cowdenbeath | A | 2–0 | 346 | Cawley 20', Kirk 32' |
| 13 | 16 November 2013 | Raith Rovers | H | 1–0 | 858 | Kirk 58' |
| 14 | 4 December 2013 | Dumbarton | A | 1–1 | 463 | Cawley 24' |
| 15 | 7 December 2013 | Hamilton Academical | A | 1–0 | 860 | Meggatt 47' |
| 16 | 14 December 2013 | Greenock Morton | H | 2–0 | 546 | Kirk 43', McManus 85' |
| 17 | 21 December 2013 | Dundee | H | 0–1 | 1,170 | |
| 18 | 28 December 2013 | Falkirk | A | 0–0 | 3,417 | |
| 19 | 2 January 2014 | Cowdenbeath | H | 0–1 | 818 | |
| 20 | 11 January 2014 | Queen of the South | A | 1–3 | 1,476 | Caldwell 62' |
| 21 | 18 January 2014 | Dumbarton | H | 1–5 | 602 | Cawley 71' |
| 22 | 1 February 2014 | Dundee | A | 1–1 | 4,021 | Gordon 90' |
| 23 | 15 February 2014 | Livingston | H | 0–3 | 605 | |
| 24 | 22 February 2014 | Greenock Morton | A | 1–0 | 1,628 | McCord 18' |
| 25 | 25 February 2014 | Raith Rovers | A | 1–1 | 978 | Ferns 24' |
| 26 | 1 March 2014 | Hamilton Academical | H | 0–3 | 656 | |
| 27 | 8 March 2014 | Cowdenbeath | A | 2–2 | 458 | Holmes 8', McCord 59' |
| 28 | 15 March 2014 | Queen of the South | H | 0–1 | 644 | |
| 29 | 22 March 2014 | Falkirk | H | 3–0 | 1,025 | Ferns 71', Cawley 78', McCord 87' |
| 30 | 25 March 2014 | Livingston | A | 0–2 | 709 | |
| 31 | 29 March 2014 | Raith Rovers | H | 0–1 | 726 | |
| 32 | 5 April 2014 | Dumbarton | A | 1–4 | 677 | Caddis 88' |
| 33 | 12 April 2014 | Greenock Morton | H | 2–0 | 615 | Cawley 15', McCord 53' |
| 34 | 19 April 2014 | Hamilton Academical | A | 1–2 | 1,087 | Caldwell 83' |
| 35 | 26 April 2014 | Dundee | H | 0–3 | 2,552 | |
| 36 | 3 May 2014 | Falkirk | A | 1–3 | 3,998 | Cawley 29' |

=== Scottish Cup ===
| Round | Date | Opponent | Venue | Result | Attendance | Scorers |
|---|---|---|---|---|---|---|
| R1 | 2 November 2013 | Inverurie Loco Works | H | 3–0 | 403 | Cawley 58', Gordon 69', Salmon 87' |
| R2 | 30 November 2013 | Stirling Albion | H | 3–2 | 1,278 | McCord 51', Holmes 59', Marr 90' |
| R3 | 8 February 2014 | Dumbarton | H | 0–1 | 749 | |

=== Scottish League Cup ===
| Round | Date | Opponent | Venue | Result | Attendance | Scorers |
|---|---|---|---|---|---|---|
| R1 | 3 August 2013 | Peterhead | A | 2–0 | 429 | McCord 52', Kirk 83' |
| R2 | 27 August 2013 | Aberdeen | A | 0–0 (5–6) pens) | 4,897 | |

=== Scottish Challenge Cup ===
| Round | Date | Opponent | Venue | Result | Attendance | Scorers |
|---|---|---|---|---|---|---|
| R2 | 27 July 2013 | Dundee | H | 0–1 | 880 | |

== Final league table ==
| Pos | Team | Pld | W | D | L | GF | GA | GD | Pts | Promotion, qualification or relegation |
|---|---|---|---|---|---|---|---|---|---|---|
| 6 | Livingston | 36 | 13 | 7 | 16 | 51 | 56 | −5 | 46 | |
| 7 | Raith Rovers | 36 | 11 | 9 | 16 | 48 | 61 | −13 | 42 | |
| 8 | Alloa Athletic | 36 | 11 | 7 | 18 | 34 | 51 | −17 | 40 | |
| 9 | Cowdenbeath (O) | 36 | 11 | 7 | 18 | 50 | 72 | −22 | 40 | Qualification for the Championship play-offs |
| 10 | Greenock Morton (R) | 36 | 6 | 8 | 22 | 32 | 71 | −39 | 26 | Relegation to League One |

Source: Soccerway
Rules for classification: 1) points; 2) goal difference; 3) number of goals scored.
(O) Play-off winners; (R) Relegated
