= 2011–12 Alloa Athletic F.C. season =

Alloa Athletic
2011–12 season
- Chairman: Mike Mulraney
- Manager: Paul Hartley
- Stadium: Recreation Park
- Scottish Third Division: 1st (champions)
- Challenge Cup: Round One
- League Cup: Round One
- Scottish Cup: Second round
- Top goalscorer: League: Stevie May (19); All: Stevie May (19)
- Highest home attendance: 2,551 v Annan Athletic Scottish Third Division 5 May 2012
- Lowest home attendance: 419 v Queen's Park Scottish Third Division 10 December 2011

The 2011–12 season was Alloa Athletic's first season back in the Scottish Third Division, having been relegated from the Scottish Second Division at the end of the 2010–11 season. Alloa also competed in the Challenge Cup, League Cup and the Scottish Cup.

== Summary ==
Alloa finished first in the Third Division, and were promoted as champions to the Second Division. They reached the first round of the Challenge Cup, the first round of the League Cup and the second round of the Scottish Cup.

=== Management ===
They were managed for season 2011–12 under the management of Paul Hartley. He replaced Allan Maitland, who was sacked towards the end of the previous season.

== Results & fixtures ==
=== Third Division ===
6 August 2011 Scottish Third Division	Stranraer	2–3	Alloa Athletic	Stair Park
15:00	Aitken 17'; Winter 35'	BBC Report	McCord 2' (pen.); Gordon 59'; Caddis (red card) 64'; Cawley 84'	Attendance: 306; Referee: Roache

13 August 2011 Scottish Third Division	Alloa Athletic	2–2	Clyde	Recreation Park
15:00	McCord 31'; Docherty 61'; Bain (red card)	BBC Report	Sweeney 21', 80' (pen.)	Attendance: 705; Referee: Colvin

20 August 2011 Scottish Third Division	Annan Athletic	2–0	Alloa Athletic	Galabank
15:00	Harty 33'; Cox 64'	BBC Report		Attendance: 516; Referee: Collum

27 August 2011 Scottish Third Division	Alloa Athletic	2–1	Peterhead	Recreation Park
15:00	Cawley 46', 67'	SFL Report	McAllister 30'	Attendance: 507; Referee: Cook

10 September 2011 Scottish Third Division	East Stirlingshire	0–1	Alloa Athletic	Galabank
15:00		BBC Report	Gordon 45'	Attendance: 419; Referee: Aitken

17 September 2011 Scottish Third Division	Queen's Park	1–3	Alloa Athletic	Hampden Park
15:00	Quinn 86'	SFL Report	Cawley 9', 28'; Doyle 84'	Attendance: 589; Referee: Winter

24 September 2011 Scottish Third Division	Alloa Athletic	4–2	Montrose	Recreation Park
15:00	McCord 4' (pen.); Cawley 28', 79'; Gordon 51'	SFL Report	Campbell 27'; Boyle 37'	Attendance: 461; Referee: Robertson

1 October 2011 Scottish Third Division	Elgin City	5–0	Alloa Athletic	Borough Briggs
15:00	Beveridge 21', 78'; Cameron 43'; Leslie 45' (pen.), 56' (pen.)	BBC Report	Docherty (red card) 45'; Bain (yellow card) 56' (red card)	Attendance: 522; Referee: Barry Cook

15 October 2011 Scottish Third Division	Alloa Athletic	1–1	Berwick Rangers	Recreation Park
15:00	Holmes 7'	SFL Report	McLeod 16'	Attendance: 442; Referee: Robertson

29 October 2011 Scottish Third Division	Clyde	P – P	Alloa Athletic	Broadwood Stadium
15:00

5 November 2011 Scottish Third Division	Alloa Athletic	1–0	Stranraer	Recreation Park
15:00	McCord 58'; Gordon (yellow card) 91' (red card)	SFL Report		Attendance: 502; Referee: Aitken

8 November 2011 Scottish Third Division	Clyde	0–1	Alloa Athletic	Broadwood Stadium
19:45		SFL Report	Forrest (yellow card) 32' (red card); Holmes 2'	Attendance: 654; Referee: Anderson

12 November 2011 Scottish Third Division	Peterhead	1–1	Alloa Athletic	Balmoor Stadium
15:00	McDowall 87' (o.g.)	SFL Report	One 77'	Attendance: 528; Referee: Northcroft

26 November 2011 Scottish Third Division	Alloa Athletic	1–1	East Stirlingshire	Recreation Park
15:00	Campbell 83'	SFL Report	Hunter 65'	Attendance: 421; Referee: McKendrick

3 December 2011 Scottish Third Division	Montrose	1–1	Alloa Athletic	Links Park
15:00	Johnston 15'	SFL Report	Gordon 79'	Attendance: 313; Referee: Dallas

10 December 2011 Scottish Third Division	Alloa Athletic	1–0	Queen's Park	Recreation Park
	Doyle 6'	SFL Report; Alloa Report		Attendance: 419; Referee: Anderson

17 December 2011 Scottish Third Division	Berwick Rangers	2–2	Alloa Athletic	Shielfield Park
15:00	Deland 78'; Gray 84'	SFL Report	McCord 44'; May 61'	Attendance: 362; Referee: Allan

26 December 2011 Scottish Third Division	Alloa Athletic	3–0	Elgin City	Recreation Park
	Docherty 16'; Cawley 59'; Gordon (red card) 64'; McCord 90'	SFL Report		Attendance: 491; Referee: Robertson

2 January 2012 Scottish Third Division	East Stirlingshire	1–3	Alloa Athletic	Ochilview Park
15:00	Beveridge 6'	SFL Report	May 2', 46', 74'	Attendance: 531; Referee: Northcroft

7 January 2012 Scottish Third Division	Alloa Athletic	P – P	Peterhead	Recreation Park
15:00

14 January 2012 Scottish Third Division	Alloa Athletic	1–0	Annan Athletic	Recreation Park
	May 30'	SFL Report		Attendance: 635; Referee: Aitken

21 January 2012 Scottish Third Division	Stranraer	0–4	Alloa Athletic	Stair Park
15:00		SFL Report	Docherty 25'; May 40', 69'; Masterton 60'	Attendance: 475; Referee: Robertson

28 January 2012 Scottish Third Division	Alloa Athletic	2–0	Montrose	Recreation Park
15:00	McKinnon 87'; May 90'	SFL Report		Attendance: 508; Referee: Roache

31 January 2012 Scottish Third Division	Alloa Athletic	3–1	Peterhead	Recreation Park
19:45	Gordon 13'; Docherty 37'; May 65'	BBC Report	McAllister 35'	Attendance: 429; Referee: Madden

4 February 2012 Scottish Third Division	Queen's Park	1–2	Alloa Athletic	Hampden Park
15:00	Daly 85'	SFL Report	Cawley 29'; Little 41' (o.g.)	Attendance: 711; Referee: Aitken

11 February 2012 Scottish Third Division	Alloa Athletic	0–1	Berwick Rangers	Recreation Park
15:00		SFL Report	Gray 59' (pen.); Notman (yellow card) 84' (red card)	Attendance: 544; Referee: Dallas

18 February 2012 Scottish Third Division	Elgin City	3–0	Alloa Athletic	Borough Briggs
15:00	Millar 1'; Gunn 37'; Leslie 67'	SFL Report		Attendance: 600; Referee: McDermott

25 February 2012 Scottish Third Division	Alloa Athletic	1–0	Clyde	Recreation Park
15:00	Young 76'	SFL Report		Attendance: 719; Referee: Anderson

3 March 2012 Scottish Third Division	Annan Athletic	1–2	Alloa Athletic	Galabank
15:00	O'Connor 33'	SFL Report	Young 7'; May 77'	Attendance: 642; Referee: Graham

10 March 2012 Scottish Third Division	Alloa Athletic	5–1	East Stirlingshire	Recreation Park
15:00	Winters 26'; May 43'; Harding 60'; McCord 72'; Campbell 81'	SFL Report	Lurinsky 1'	Attendance: 579; Referee: Barry Cook

17 March 2012 Scottish Third Division	Peterhead	0–1	Alloa Athletic	Balmoor Stadium
15:00		SFL Report	May 20'	Attendance: 488; Referee: Robertson

24 March 2012 Scottish Third Division	Alloa Athletic	4–0	Queen's Park	Recreation Park
15:00	Winters 14', 58'; May 86'; Holmes 90'	SFL Report	Brough (red card) 84'	Attendance: 807; Referee: Robertson

31 March 2012 Scottish Third Division	Montrose	0–2	Alloa Athletic	Links Park
15:00	Campbell (red card) 79'	SFL Report	Harding (red card) 19'; McCord 80' (pen.), 83'	Attendance: 390; Referee: Northcroft

7 April 2012 Scottish Third Division	Alloa Athletic	8–1	Elgin City	Recreation Park
15:00	Nicolson 30' (o.g.); May 44', 46', 65', 75'; Winters 49'; McCord 82'; Campbell 83'	SFL Report	Clark (red card) 16'; Millar 51'	Attendance: 730; Referee: Brines

14 April 2012 Scottish Third Division	Berwick Rangers	5–0	Alloa Athletic	Shielfield Park
15:00	Handling 13', 51'; Currie 14'; Harding 34' (o.g.); Noble 58'	SFL Report		Attendance: 486; Referee: Anderson

21 April 2012 Scottish Third Division	Alloa Athletic	3–1	Stranraer	Recreation Park
15:00	McCord 13', 68'; Winters 34'	SFL Report	Gallagher 25'	Attendance: 617; Referee: Crawford

28 April 2012 Scottish Third Division	Clyde	1–1	Alloa Athletic	Broadwood Stadium
15:00	Scullion 65'	SFL Report	May 6'	Attendance: 748; Referee: Steven

5 May 2012 Scottish Third Division	Alloa Athletic	0–1	Annan Athletic	Recreation Park
15:00	May 87'	SFL Report	Bell 31'	Attendance: 2,551; Referee: Salmond

=== Challenge Cup ===
23 July 2011 Challenge Cup R1	Peterhead	2–2 (a.e.t.) (5–4 p)	Alloa Athletic	Balmoor
	Beasley 30'; McAllister 60'	BBC Report	McCord 16'; Wright 73'	Attendance: 443; Referee: Hilland

=== Scottish League Cup ===
30 July 2011 League Cup R1	Alloa Athletic	0–3	Greenock Morton	Recreation Park
		BBC Report	Di Giacomo 29'; Jackson 67'; Weatherson 92'	Attendance: 683; Referee: Finnie

=== Scottish Cup ===
22 October 2011 Round 2	Alloa Athletic	2–2	Annan Athletic	Recreation Park
15:00	Cawley 16'; Masterton 68'	Sky Report	Cox 36'; Watson 54'	Attendance: 490; Referee: Brines

29 October 2011 Round 2 Replay	Annan Athletic	2–0	Alloa Athletic	Galabank
15:00	Gilfillan 28'; Muirhead 85'	Sky Report		Attendance: 502; Referee: Brines

== Player statistics ==
=== Squad ===
Last updated 5 May 2012

No.	Pos	Nat	Player	Total		Third Division		Scottish Cup		League Cup		Challenge Cup	
No.	Pos	Nat	Player	Apps	Goals	Apps	Goals	Apps	Goals	Apps	Goals	Apps	Goals
	GK	(Scotland) SCO	Scott Bain	34	0	30	0	2	0	1	0	1	0
	GK	(Scotland) SCO	Craig McDowall	8	0	8	0	0	0	0	0	0	0
	DF	(Scotland) SCO	Mark Docherty	31	4	29	4	0	0	1	0	1	0
	DF	(Scotland) SCO	Michael Doyle (Note: Players Name is James Michael Doyle, Some match reports refer to Michael Doyle others James Doyle)	40	2	36	2	2	0	1	0	1	0
	DF	(Scotland) SCO	Fraser Forrest	7	0	5	0	2	0	0	0	0	0
	DF	(Scotland) SCO	Ben Gordon	37	5	33	5	2	0	1	0	1	0
	DF	(Scotland) SCO	Ryan Harding	38	1	35	1	1	0	1	0	1	0
	DF	(Scotland) SCO	Mark McCullagh	15	0	13	0	2	0	0	0	0	0
	DF	(Scotland) SCO	Ross McKinnon	16	1	16	1	0	0	0	0	0	0
	DF	(Scotland) SCO	Ross Philp	0	0	0	0	0	0	0	0	0	0
	DF	(Scotland) SCO	Allan Ramsey	0	0	0	0	0	0	0	0	0	0
	DF	(Scotland) SCO	Stirling Smith	3	0	3	0	0	0	0	0	0	0
	DF	(Scotland) SCO	Kevin McHattie	5	0	5	0	0	0	0	0	0	0
	MF	(Scotland) SCO	Paul Hartley	0	0	0	0	0	0	0	0	0	0
	MF	(Scotland) SCO	Graeme Holmes	38	3	34	3	2	0	1	0	1	0
	MF	(Scotland) SCO	Peter Innes	8	0	7	0	0	0	1	0	0	0
	MF	(Scotland) SCO	Nicholas Locke	1	0	1	0	0	0	0	0	0	0
	MF	(Scotland) SCO	Ross McCord	31	2	28	1	1	0	1	0	1	1
	MF	(Scotland) SCO	Ryan McCord	36	11	32	11	2	0	1	0	1	0
	MF	(Scotland) SCO	Darren Young	34	2	32	2	1	0	0	0	1	0
	MF	(Scotland) SCO	Steven Masterton	16	2	14	1	2	1	0	0	0	0
	FW	(Scotland) SCO	Ryan Caddis	4	0	2	0	0	0	1	0	1	0
	FW	(Scotland) SCO	Craig Campbell	18	3	15	3	1	0	1	0	1	0
	FW	(Scotland) SCO	Kevin Cawley	39	10	35	9	2	1	1	0	1	0
	FW	(Scotland) SCO	Steven Howarth	2	0	2	0	0	0	0	0	0	0
	FW	(Scotland) SCO	Kenny O'Brien	2	0	2	0	0	0	0	0	0	0
	FW	(France) FRA	Armand One	18	1	14	1	2	0	1	0	1	0
	FW	(Scotland) SCO	Max Wright	10	1	7	0	1	0	1	0	1	1
	FW	(Scotland) SCO	Robbie Winters	28	4	27	4	1	0	0	0	0	0
	FW	(Scotland) SCO	Stevie May	22	19	22	19	0	0	0	0	0	0
	FW	(England) ENG	Matthew Bradley	18	13	9	7	4	2	4	1	1	3

=== Disciplinary record ===
Includes all competitive matches.

Last updated 5 May 2012

Nation	Position	Name	Third Division		Scottish Cup		League Cup		Challenge Cup		Total	
Nation	Position	Name	Booked	Sent off (straight red)	Booked	Sent off (straight red)	Booked	Sent off (straight red)	Booked	Sent off (straight red)	Booked	Sent off (straight red)
(Scotland)	GK	Scott Bain	1	2	0	0	0	0	1	0	2	2
(Scotland)	GK	Craig McDowall	0	0	0	0	0	0	0	0	0	0
(Scotland)	DF	Mark Docherty	1	1	0	0	0	0	0	0	1	1
(Scotland)	DF	Michael Doyle	2	0	0	0	0	0	0	0	2	0
(Scotland)	DF	Fraser Forrest	2	1	0	0	0	0	0	0	2	1
(Scotland)	DF	Ben Gordon	7	2	1	0	0	0	1	0	9	2
(Scotland)	DF	Ryan Harding	4	1	0	0	0	0	0	0	4	1
(Scotland)	DF	Mark McCullagh	0	0	0	0	0	0	0	0	0	0
(Scotland)	DF	Ross McKinnon	2	0	0	0	0	0	0	0	2	0
(Scotland)	DF	Ross Philp	0	0	0	0	0	1	0	0	0	1
(Scotland)	DF	Allan Ramsey	0	0	0	0	0	0	0	0	0	0
(Scotland)	DF	Stirling Smith	0	0	0	0	0	0	0	0	0	0
(Scotland)	DF	Kevin McHattie	3	0	0	0	0	0	0	0	3	0
(Scotland)	MF	Paul Hartley	0	0	0	0	0	0	0	0	0	0
(Scotland)	MF	Graeme Holmes	2	0	1	0	1	0	0	0	4	0
(Scotland)	MF	Peter Innes	2	0	0	0	0	0	0	0	2	0
(Scotland)	MF	Nicholas Locke	0	0	0	0	0	0	0	0	0	0
(Scotland)	MF	Ross McCord	2	0	0	0	1	0	0	0	3	0
(Scotland)	MF	Ryan McCord	13	0	0	0	1	0	1	0	15	0
(Scotland)	MF	Darren Young	4	0	0	0	0	0	0	0	4	0
(Scotland)	MF	Steven Masterton	1	0	0	0	0	0	0	0	1	0
(Scotland)	FW	Ryan Caddis	0	1	0	0	0	0	0	0	0	1
(Scotland)	FW	Craig Campbell	1	0	0	0	0	0	0	0	1	0
(Scotland)	FW	Kevin Cawley	3	0	1	0	0	0	0	0	4	0
(Scotland)	FW	Steven Howarth	0	0	0	0	0	0	0	0	0	0
(Scotland)	FW	Kenny O'Brien	0	0	0	0	0	0	0	0	0	0
(France)	FW	Armand One	1	0	1	0	0	0	0	0	2	0
(Scotland)	FW	Max Wright	0	0	0	0	0	0	0	0	0	0
(Scotland)	FW	Robbie Winters	1	0	0	0	0	0	0	0	1	0
(Scotland)	FW	Stevie May	0	0	0	0	0	0	0	0	0	0

=== Awards ===
Last updated 4 May 2012

Nation	Name	Award	Month
(Scotland)	Paul Hartley	Third Division Manager of the Month	September
(Scotland)	Paul Hartley	Third Division Manager of the Month	January
(Scotland)	Stevie May	Player of the Month	January
(Scotland)	Stevie May	Young Player of the Month	January
(Scotland)	Stevie May	Ginger Boot Award	January
(Scotland)	Paul Hartley	Third Division Manager of the Month	March
(Scotland)	Stevie May	Third Division Player of the Year	IRN-BRU SFL End of Season Awards
(Scotland)	Paul Hartley	Third Division Manager of the Season	IRN-BRU SFL End of Season Awards

== League table ==
Pos	Team	Pld	W	D	L	GF	GA	GD	Pts	Promotion or qualification
1	Alloa Athletic (C, P)	36	23	8	5	70	39	+31	77	Promotion to the Second Division
2	Queen's Park	36	19	6	11	70	48	+22	63	Qualification for the Second Division Play-offs
3	Stranraer (P)	36	17	7	12	77	57	+20	58 (Note: Stranraer advanced to the final of the Second Division play-offs but were defeated by Albion Rovers, who retained their place in the Second Division. However, following the demotion of Rangers to the Third Division, Dundee were promoted from the First Division to the SPL, Airdrie United promoted from the Second to the First Division, and Stranraer were promoted from the Third to the Second Division.)	Qualification for the Second Division Play-offs
4	Elgin City	36	16	9	11	68	60	+8	57	Qualification for the Second Division Play-offs
5	Peterhead	36	15	6	15	51	53	−2	51	

Source: SPFL Archive
Rules for classification: 1) points; 2) goal difference; 3) number of goals scored.
(C) Champions; (P) Promoted

== Transfers ==
=== Players in ===
Player	From	Fee
(Scotland) Scott Bain	(Scotland) Aberdeen	Free
(Scotland) Kevin Cawley	(Scotland) East Stirlingshire	Free
(Scotland) Ryan McCord	(Scotland) Dundee United	Free
(Scotland) Ross McCord	(Scotland) Dundee United	Free
(France) Armand One	(Scotland) Stranraer	Free
(Scotland) Darren Young	(Scotland) Greenock Morton	Free
(Scotland) Ryan Harding	(Malta) Birkirkara	Free
(Scotland) Ryan Caddis	(Scotland) Ayr United	Free
(Scotland) Graeme Holmes	(Scotland) Greenock Morton	Free
(Scotland) Ben Gordon	(Scotland) Dumbarton	Free
(Scotland) Craig Campbell	(Scotland) Nairn County	Free
(Scotland) Michael Doyle	(Scotland) Kilmarnock	Free
(Scotland) Mark McCullugh	(Northern Ireland) Ballymena United	Free
(Scotland) Craig McDowall	(Scotland) Livingston	Free
(Scotland) Mark Docherty	(Scotland) Brechin City	Free
(Scotland) Steven Howarth	(Scotland) Motherwell	Loan
(Scotland) Robbie Winters	(Iceland) Knattspyrnudeild UMFG	Free
(Scotland) Stirling Smith	(Scotland) Aberdeen	Free
(Scotland) Peter Innes	(Scotland) Motherwell	Free
(Scotland) Fraser Forrest	(Scotland) Bo'ness United	Free
(Scotland) Max Wright	(Scotland) Rangers	Free
(Scotland) Steven Masterton	(Scotland) Auchinleck Talbot	Free
(Scotland) Kevin McHattie	(Scotland) Heart of Midlothian	Loan
(Scotland) Stevie May	(Scotland) St Johnstone	Loan
(Scotland) Ross McKinnon	(Scotland) Motherwell	Loan

=== Players out ===
Player	To	Fee
(Scotland) David McClune	(Scotland) Brechin	Free
(Scotland) Mick Dunlop	(Scotland) Brechin	Free
(Scotland) Jamie Ewings	(Scotland) Dumbarton	Free
(Scotland) Bryan Prunty	(Scotland) Dumbarton	Free
(Scotland) Darren Smith	(Scotland) East Fife	Free
(Scotland) Stirling Smith	(Scotland) Cove Rangers	Free
(Scotland) Ryan Caddis	Free Agent	Free
(Scotland) Stephen Robertson	(Scotland) Kirkintilloch Rob Roy	Free
(Scotland) Jim Lister	(Scotland) Brechin City	Free
(Scotland) Stuart Noble	(Scotland) Berwick Rangers	Free
(Scotland) Kevin McDonald	(Scotland) Berwick Rangers	Free
(Scotland) Scott Walker	(Scotland) Linlithgow Rose	Free
(Scotland) David Gormley	(Scotland) Kirkintilloch Rob Roy	Free
(Scotland) Andy Scott	(Scotland) Albion Rovers	Free
(Northern Ireland) Michael McGowan	(Scotland) Ayr United	Free
(Scotland) Brown Ferguson	(Scotland) Stenhousemuir	Free
(Scotland) Kevin Motion	(Scotland) Alloa Athletic	Free
(Scotland) Jamie Hay	(Scotland) Bo'ness United	Free
(Scotland) Nathan Taggart	(Scotland) Bo'ness United	Free
(Scotland) Hugh Kerr	Free Agent	Free
(Scotland) Billy Gibson	Free Agent	Free
(Scotland) Mark Brown	Free Agent	Free
(Scotland) Peter Innes	(Scotland) East Kilbride Thistle	Free
(Scotland) Grant Sandison	(Scotland) Oakley United	Loan
(Scotland) Fraser Forrest		Retired
(France) Armand One	Free Agent	Free
