= Jason Marr =

Scottish footballer

Personal information
- Full name: Benjamin Jason Wardlaw Marr
- Date of birth: 23 February 1989 (age 37)
- Place of birth: Glasgow, Scotland
- Height: 1.80 m (5 ft 11 in)
- Position: Defender

Senior career*
Years	Team	Apps	(Gls)
2007–2010	Celtic	1	(0)
2010–2011	→ Falkirk (loan)	14	(1)
2011	→ Ross County (loan)	13	(1)
2011–2012	Clyde	16	(0)
2012–2017	Alloa Athletic	112	(6)
2017–2018	Albion Rovers	18	(3)
2018–2019	Stirling Albion	18	(0)
2019–2022	Darvel		

International career
2010	Scotland U21	1	(0)
- * Club domestic league appearances and goals

Benjamin Jason Wardlaw Marr (born 23 February 1989) is a Scottish former professional footballer who played as a defender.

== Career ==
=== Celtic and loan spells ===
Born in Glasgow, Marr began his career with Celtic, but did not make any competitive first team appearances for them. In June 2010, he moved on loan to Falkirk for 6 months before returning to Celtic. Upon his return in January 2011, he was sent out on loan again, this time to Ross County.

=== Clyde ===
Marr left Celtic in June 2011, and remained without a club until December 2011, when he signed a short-term deal with Clyde. He played his first game for Clyde on 3 December, against Berwick Rangers at Shielfield Park. On Sunday 8 January 2012, he officially signed a new contract till the end of the season.

=== Alloa Athletic ===
On 23 August 2012, Marr signed for Alloa Athletic. After Alloa won promotion to the Scottish Championship, he signed a new one-year contract for the 2013–14 season. After five years with Alloa, Marr was released by the club in May 2017.

=== Albion Rovers ===
Marr was not without a club for long, signing for fellow Scottish League One side Albion Rovers on 2 June 2017.

=== Stirling Albion ===
In early summer 2018, after being released by Albion Rovers, he was signed by Scottish League Two side Stirling Albion. He made his first appearances for the club in the group stage of the Scottish League Cup.

=== Darvel Juniors ===
On 5 July 2019 Marr signed for Junior Side Darvel.

== Career statistics ==
As of 22 September 2018

Appearances and goals by club, season and competition
Club	Season	League		Cup		League Cup		Other^{[A]}		Total	
Club	Season	Apps	Goals	Apps	Goals	Apps	Goals	Apps	Goals	Apps	Goals
Celtic	2007–08	0	0	0	0	0	0	0	0	0	0
Celtic	2008–09	0	0	0	0	0	0	0	0	0	0
Celtic	2009–10	0	0	0	0	0	0	0	0	0	0
Celtic	2010–11	0	0	0	0	0	0	0	0	0	0
Celtic	Total	0	0	0	0	0	0	0	0	0	0
Falkirk (loan)	2010–11	14	1	0	0	3	0	1	0	18	1
Ross County (loan)	2010–11	13	1	2	0	0	0	0	0	15	1
Clyde	2011–12	17	0	0	0	0	0	0	0	17	0
Alloa Athletic	2012–13	32	2	1	0	0	0	2	0	35	2
Alloa Athletic	2013–14	14	0	1	1	1	0	0	0	16	1
Alloa Athletic	2014–15	13	0	1	0	0	0	1	0	15	0
Alloa Athletic	2015–16	28	2	0	0	0	0	0	0	28	2
Alloa Athletic	2016–17	25	2	0	0	5	1	2	0	32	3
Alloa Athletic	Total	112	6	3	1	6	1	5	0	126	8
Albion Rovers	2017–18	18	3	0	0	1	0	1	0	20	3
Stirling Albion	2018—19	4	0	0	0	4	0	1	0	9	0
Career total		175	11	5	1	10	1	8	0	201	13

A. Other includes Scottish Challenge Cup

== International ==
Marr has one Scotland under-21 cap, coming in a friendly against Sweden in August 2010.
