= Ben Gordon (footballer, born 1985) =

Scottish footballer

Personal information
- Date of birth: 7 October 1985 (age 41)
- Place of birth: Glasgow, Scotland
- Position: Centre back

Youth career
- Pollok Boys
- 2002–2004: St Mirren

Senior career*
| Years | Team | Apps | (Gls) |
| 2004–2008 | Strathclyde University | | |
| 2008–2011 | Dumbarton | 102 | (6) |
| 2011–2015 | Alloa Athletic | 136 | (14) |
| 2015–2016 | Livingston | 28 | (1) |
| 2016–2017 | St Mirren | 8 | (2) |
| 2016 | → Alloa Athletic (loan) | 3 | (0) |
| 2017-2018 | East Fife | 5 | (0) |
- * Club domestic league appearances and goals as of 15 February 2019

Ben Gordon (born 7 October 1985) is a Scottish former footballer who played as a central defender.

== Career ==
Gordon began his footballing career at St Mirren's Academy, but was released in 2004. Shortly after, he went to the University of Strathclyde and played for Strathclyde University FC, an amateur club. Four years later, he went back to senior terms, signing with Dumbarton. He signed a new deal with the club in May 2009, being appointed captain a year later.

On 27 June 2011, Gordon signed with Alloa Athletic. He established himself as a first-team regular, being promoted twice in his first two seasons at the club. On 10 August 2013 he made his professional debut, in a 1–0 home win over Livingston.

In July 2015 after four-years with Alloa, Gordon moved to Scottish Championship rivals Livingston. Gordon joined St Mirren on a one-year deal in June 2016, leaving Livingston following their relegation to Scottish League One.

On 16 September 2016, a week after making his debut for St Mirren, Gordon moved on loan to Alloa Athletic, signing until January 2017. Gordon's loan was cut short, when new Saints boss Jack Ross recalled him in October 2016. Gordon was released by St Mirren in May 2017, following the end of his contract. He then signed for East Fife, before leaving the side in September 2017.

== Career statistics ==
As of match played 14 October 2017

Appearances and goals by club, season and competition
| Club | Season | League | | | Scottish Cup | | League Cup | | Other | | Total | |
| Club | Season | Division | Apps | Goals | Apps | Goals | Apps | Goals | Apps | Goals | Apps | Goals |
|---|---|---|---|---|---|---|---|---|---|---|---|---|
| Dumbarton | 2008–09 | Third Division | 36 | 3 | 1 | 0 | 2 | 0 | 0 | 0 | 39 | 3 |
| Dumbarton | 2009–10 | Second Division | 34 | 3 | 0 | 0 | 1 | 0 | 0 | 0 | 35 | 3 |
| Dumbarton | 2010–11 | Second Division | 32 | 0 | 0 | 0 | 0 | 0 | 0 | 0 | 32 | 0 |
| Dumbarton | Dumbarton total | | 102 | 6 | 1 | 0 | 3 | 0 | 0 | 0 | 106 | 6 |
| Alloa Athletic | 2011–12 | Third Division | 33 | 5 | 0 | 0 | 1 | 0 | 1 (Note: Appearances in the Scottish Challenge Cup) | 0 | 35 | 5 |
| Alloa Athletic | 2012–13 | Second Division | 33 | 4 | 0 | 0 | 1 | 1 | 5 (Note: One appearance and a goal in the Scottish Challenge Cup; four appearances in the Promotion play-offs) | 1 | 39 | 6 |
| Alloa Athletic | 2013–14 | Championship | 35 | 3 | 3 | 1 | 2 | 0 | 1 | 0 | 41 | 4 |
| Alloa Athletic | 2014–15 | Championship | 35 | 2 | 3 | 0 | 2 | 0 | 9 (Note: Five appearances in the Scottish Challenge Cup and four in the Relegation play-offs) | 0 | 49 | 2 |
| Alloa Athletic | Alloa total | | 136 | 14 | 6 | 1 | 6 | 1 | 16 | 1 | 164 | 17 |
| Livingston | 2015–16 | Championship | 28 | 1 | 2 | 0 | 2 | 0 | 3 | 0 | 35 | 1 |
| St Mirren | 2016–17 | Championship | 8 | 2 | 1 | 0 | 0 | 0 | 0 | 0 | 9 | 2 |
| Alloa Athletic (loan) | 2016–17 | League One | 3 | 0 | 0 | 0 | 1 | 0 | 1 | 0 | 5 | 0 |
| East Fife | 2017–18 | League One | 5 | 0 | 0 | 0 | 3 | 0 | 1 | 0 | 9 | 0 |
| Career total | | | 282 | 23 | 10 | 1 | 15 | 1 | 21 | 1 | 328 | 26 |

== Honours ==
Dumbarton

- Scottish Division Three (fourth tier): Winners 2008–09
