= Kevin Cawley =

Scottish footballer (born 1989)

Personal information
- Date of birth: 17 March 1989 (age 37)
- Place of birth: Glasgow, Scotland
- Height: 5 ft 8 in (1.73 m)
- Position: Striker

Team information
- Current team: Alloa Athletic
- Number: 7

Youth career
- 2005–2009: Celtic

Senior career*
Years	Team	Apps	(Gls)
2009–2010	Ayr United	11	(0)
2010	→ Stranraer (loan)	15	(2)
2010–2011	East Stirlingshire	35	(8)
2011–2015	Alloa Athletic	138	(36)
2015–2016	Dumbarton	32	(2)
2016–	Alloa Athletic	229	(28)
- * Club domestic league appearances and goals as of 12:27, 22 October 2021 (UTC)

Kevin Cawley (born 17 March 1989) is a Scottish professional footballer who plays as a striker for Scottish League One club Alloa Athletic.

== Career ==
Born in Glasgow, Cawley started his career at Celtic, where he was a high goal scorer for their reserve side.

After being released by Celtic in 2009, Cawley signed for Ayr United on a one-year contract. Cawley made his debut for the Honest Men on 25 July 2009 against Albion Rovers in the Challenge Cup. In March 2010, Cawley was loaned out for a month to Stranraer (in the Third Division) to get some match practice.

He spent the 2010–11 season at East Stirlingshire, then in June 2011 he signed for Alloa Athletic.

After four years with Alloa, Cawley signed for Scottish Championship rivals Dumbarton. He scored his first goal for the club in a 2–0 friendly win over Hearts. His first competitive goal came in a 1–1 draw with East Fife in the Scottish League Cup on 1 August 2015

Cawley was released by Dumbarton in May 2016, subsequently re-signing for recently relegated Alloa Athletic.

== Nickname ==
Due to his small stature, some Alloa Athletic fans have compared Cawley to the club's top goalscorer for a single season Willie Crilley, referring to him as 'The Mighty Atom' – a term which Wasps fans of the 1920s also used for Crilley.

== Career statistics ==
As of match played 16 October 2021

Appearances and goals by club, season and competition
Club	Season	League			Scottish Cup		League Cup		Other		Total	
Club	Season	Division	Apps	Goals	Apps	Goals	Apps	Goals	Apps	Goals	Apps	Goals
Ayr United	2009–10	Scottish First Division	11	0	1	0	1	0	1 (Note: Appearances in the Scottish Challenge Cup)	0	14	0
Stranraer (loan)	2009–10	Scottish First Division	15	2	0	0	0	0	0	0	15	2
East Stirlingshire	2010–11	Scottish First Division	35	8	4	4	1	1	2	1	42	14
Alloa Athletic	2011–12	Scottish First Division	35	9	2	1	1	0	1	0	39	10
Alloa Athletic	2012–13	Scottish Second Division	34	13	1	0	1	0	5 (Note: One appearance in the Scottish Challenge Cup and four appearances and one goal in the First Division play-offs)	1	41	14
Alloa Athletic	2013–14	Scottish Championship	35	8	3	1	2	0	1	0	41	9
Alloa Athletic	2014–15	Scottish Championship	34	5	3	0	2	0	8 (Note: Four appearances in the Scottish Challenge Cup and four in the Championship play-offs)	0	47	5
Alloa Athletic	Total		138	35	9	2	6	0	15	1	168	38
Dumbarton	2015–16	Scottish Championship	32	2	4	0	1	1	2	0	39	3
Alloa Athletic	2016–17	Scottish League One	35	6	2	0	5	0	7 (Note: Three appearances and one goal in the Scottish Challenge Cup and four appearances in the Championship play-offs)	1	49	7
Alloa Athletic	2017–18	Scottish League One	33	5	2	0	4	0	6 (Note: Two appearances and one goal in the Scottish Challenge Cup and four appearances in the Championship play-offs)	1	45	6
Alloa Athletic	2018–19	Scottish Championship	34	1	2	1	4	1	4	2	44	5
Alloa Athletic	2019–20	Scottish Championship	26	3	2	1	4	1	2	0	34	5
Alloa Athletic	2020–21	Scottish Championship	27	5	1	0	5	0	—		33	5
Alloa Athletic	2021–22	Scottish League One	7	0	0	0	1	0	1	0	9	0
Alloa Athletic	Total		162	20	9	2	23	2	20	4	214	28
Career total			393	67	27	8	32	4	40	6	492	85

== Honours ==
Alloa Athletic

- Scottish Third Division: 2011–12
