= Eddie Ferns =

Scottish footballer (born 1991)

Personal information
- Full name: Edward Ferns
- Date of birth: 18 April 1991 (age 35)
- Place of birth: Glasgow, Scotland
- Height: 6 ft 0 in (1.83 m)
- Position: Left winger

Team information
- Current team: Petershill

Senior career*
Years	Team	Apps	(Gls)
2011–2012	Drumchapel Amateur		
2012–2016	Alloa Athletic	85	(3)
2015	→ Albion Rovers (loan)	9	(1)
2016–2017	Stirling Albion	16	(1)
2017	Arbroath	11	(0)
2017–2018	Stenhousemuir	10	(0)
2018	Clyde	3	(0)
2018–2019	St Roch's		
2019–2020	Darvel		
2020–2021	Cumbernauld United		
2021–2022	Gartcairn Juniors		
2022–	Petershill		
- * Club domestic league appearances and goals as of 25 August 2018

Edward 'Eddie' Ferns (born 18 April 1991) is a Scottish footballer who plays as a winger for Petershill.

== Career ==
Ferns began his footballing career at Drumchapel Amateur, and signed with Alloa Athletic on 14 September 2012. He made his senior debut a day later, in a 0–2 home loss against Stenhousemuir, and was a part of the side who achieved promotion to the Scottish Championship in his first season. He made his Championship debut on 24 August 2013, scoring the last of a 3–1 home win over Cowdenbeath. On 25 February 2015, Ferns moved to Scottish League Two side, Albion Rovers on loan. At the end of the 2015–16 season, Ferns chose to leave Alloa in favour of signing for rivals Stirling Albion. Ferns left Stirling in January 2017 after failing to impress and is most remembered for failing to turn up to the peak after offering a fan a "square go". He then signed for fellow Scottish League Two side Arbroath shortly after.

== Career statistics ==
As of match played 28 October

Appearances and goals by club, season and competition
Club	Season	League			Scottish Cup		League Cup		Other		Total	
Club	Season	Division	Apps	Goals	Apps	Goals	Apps	Goals	Apps	Goals	Apps	Goals
Alloa Athletic	2012–13	Second Division	20	0	0	0	0	0	1 (Note: Appearance in the First Division play-offs)	0	21	0
Alloa Athletic	2013–14	Championship	23	3	2	0	1	0	1 (Note: Appearances in the Scottish Challenge Cup)	0	27	3
Alloa Athletic	2014–15	Championship	16	0	3	0	1	0	2	0	22	0
Alloa Athletic	2015–16	Championship	26	1	1	0	1	0	2	0	30	1
Alloa Athletic	Alloa total		85	4	6	0	3	0	6	0	100	4
Albion Rovers (loan)	2014–15	League Two	9	1	—		—		—		9	1
Stirling Albion	2016–17	League Two	16	1	2	1	4	1	1	0	23	3
Arbroath	2016–17	League Two	11	0	0	0	0	0	0	0	11	0
Stenhousemuir	2017–18	League Two	10	0	1	0	3	0	1	0	15	0
Career total			131	6	9	1	10	1	8	0	158	8

== Honours ==
Arbroath

- Scottish League Two : 2016-17
