= Ryan McCord =

Scottish footballer (born 1989)

Personal information
- Full name: Ryan McCord
- Date of birth: 21 March 1989 (age 37)
- Place of birth: Dundee, Scotland
- Position: Midfielder

Team information
- Current team: Dundee North End
- Number: 18

Youth career
- 2005–2006: Fairmuir BC

Senior career*
Years	Team	Apps	(Gls)
2006–2011	Dundee United	0	(0)
2009	→ Stirling Albion (loan)	7	(1)
2010–2011	→ Airdrie United (loan)	32	(6)
2011–2015	Alloa Athletic	133	(28)
2015–2016	Raith Rovers	19	(1)
2016–2019	Arbroath	68	(25)
2019–2020	Brechin City	25	(3)
2020–2021	Broughty Athletic		
2021–2022	Lochee Harp		
2022–	Dundee North End		

International career
2007	Scotland U-19	5	(0)
- * Club domestic league appearances and goals as of 19:22 10 January 2020 (UTC)

Ryan McCord (born 21 March 1989) is a Scottish footballer who plays as a midfielder for Dundee North End. He began his career with Dundee United, making only two first team appearances, and played for Stirling Albion and Airdrie United on loan before joining Alloa Athletic in 2011, and then Raith Rovers in 2015. He joined Arbroath in 2016 where he remained until the summer of 2019.

He is a former Scotland under-19 international.

== Club career ==
McCord was born in Dundee and joined Dundee United as an under-16 player. He first signed a professional contract with his hometown club in April 2006, having previously played with United team-mate David Goodwillie in the Scottish Youth FA team when he was younger, and was part of the United under-16 team that won the Aberdeen International Football Festival in 2005.

After featuring in United's under-17 squad, McCord and nine other players were given professional contracts in April 2006, and he turned out regularly for United's youth, under-19 and reserve teams over the next two years. By the end of the 2007–08 season, McCord had appeared in the first team squad as an unused substitute on three occasions, and in May was given a one-year contract extension. McCord got his first taste of first team action in July 2008 when he featured as a substitute in two pre-season friendlies, including the glamour friendly match against Barcelona at Tannadice. He made his senior debut in a Scottish League Cup match against Airdrie United in September 2008, appearing as a substitute.

In the January transfer window of 2009, McCord was loaned to Scottish Second Division side Stirling Albion for a month, scoring in his second match for the club. After featuring throughout January, McCord's loan was extended until early March. After returning to United, McCord agreed a contract extension until May 2012, making his second appearance in another League Cup match.

On 13 June 2011 he, and his younger brother Ross, signed a one-year contract with Alloa Athletic. On 3 June 2015 McCord signed a 1-year contract with Raith Rovers. After just one season with the Rovers, McCord moved to Scottish League Two side Arbroath. McCord helped Arbroath win promotion to Scottish League One in 2017. In May 2018 the club stated that McCord would leave, but later in the close season he reversed this decision.

McCord signed for Brechin City on 9 June 2019.

== International career ==
McCord made his Scotland under-19 debut in October 2007, playing in a 1–0 defeat against Ukraine, appearing alongside United team-mate Gordon Pope.

== Career statistics ==
As of 4 January 2020

Appearances and goals by club, season and competition
Club	Season	League			Scottish Cup		League Cup		Other		Total	
Club	Season	Division	Apps	Goals	Apps	Goals	Apps	Goals	Apps	Goals	Apps	Goals
Dundee United	2008–09	Scottish Premier League	0	0	0	0	1	0	0	0	1	0
Dundee United	2009–10	Scottish Premier League	0	0	0	0	1	0	0	0	1	0
Dundee United	2010–11	Scottish Premier League	0	0	0	0	0	0	0	0	0	0
Dundee United	Total		0	0	0	0	2	0	0	0	2	0
Stirling Albion (loan)	2008–09	Scottish Second Division	7	1	0	0	0	0	0	0	7	1
Airdrie United (loan)	2010–11	Scottish Second Division	32	6	3	1	2	1	0	0	37	8
Alloa Athletic	2011–12	Scottish Third Division	32	11	2	0	1	0	1 (Note: Appearances in the Scottish Challenge Cup)	0	36	11
Alloa Athletic	2012–13	Scottish Second Division	31	11	1	0	1	0	5 (Note: One appearance in the Scottish Challenge Cup; four appearances and a goal in the First Division play-offs)	1	38	12
Alloa Athletic	2013–14	Scottish Championship	35	6	3	1	2	1	1	0	41	8
Alloa Athletic	2014–15	Scottish Championship	35	0	3	0	2	0	9 (Note: Five appearances and two goals in the Scottish Challenge Cup; four appearances in the Championship play-offs)	2	49	2
Alloa Athletic	Total		133	28	9	1	6	1	16	3	164	33
Raith Rovers	2015–16	Scottish Championship	19	1	2	1	3	0	2	0	26	2
Arbroath	2016–17	Scottish League Two	31	13	2	0	3	0	2	0	38	13
Arbroath	2017–18	Scottish League One	19	9	2	1	3	0	2 (Note: One appearance in the Scottish Challenge Cup; one appearance in the Championship play-offs)	0	26	10
Arbroath	2018–19	Scottish League One	18	3	1	0	1	0	3	0	23	3
Arbroath	Total		68	25	5	1	7	0	7	0	87	26
Brechin City	2019–20	Scottish League Two	19	3	2	0	3	0	1	0	25	3
Career total			278	64	21	4	23	2	26	3	348	73

== Honours ==
Alloa Athletic

- Scottish Third Division: 2011–12
- Scottish First Division play-offs : 2012–13
- Scottish Championship play-offs 2014–15

Arbroath

- Scottish League Two : 2016–17
- Scottish League One : 2018-19
