= Ryan Hoggan =

Scottish footballer (born 1998)

Personal information
- Full name: Ryan Hoggan
- Date of birth: 19 June 1998 (age 28)
- Height: 1.85 m (6 ft 1 in)
- Positions: Defender; midfielder

Youth career
- Rangers
- Heart of Midlothian

Senior career*
| Years | Team | Apps | (Gls) |
| 2015–2018 | Alloa Athletic | 7 | (0) |
- * Club domestic league appearances and goals as of 7 November 2017

Ryan Hoggan (born 19 June 1998) is a Scottish former footballer who played as a defender and midfielder.

== Career ==
Hoggan spent his youth career with Rangers and Heart of Midlothian before signing for Alloa Athletic. He made his debut for the club in August 2015 against Elgin City and played his first match in the Scottish Championship in a defeat to Rangers. Hoggan was released by Alloa in May 2018.

== Career statistics ==
As of match played 4 November 2017

Appearances and goals by club, season and competition
| Club | Season | League | | | Scottish Cup | | League Cup | | Other | | Total | |
| Club | Season | Division | Apps | Goals | Apps | Goals | Apps | Goals | Apps | Goals | Apps | Goals |
|---|---|---|---|---|---|---|---|---|---|---|---|---|
| Alloa Athletic | 2015–16 | Championship | 1 | 0 | 0 | 0 | 0 | 0 | 1 | 0 | 2 | 0 |
| Alloa Athletic | 2016–17 | League One | 6 | 0 | 1 | 0 | 0 | 0 | 1 | 0 | 8 | 0 |
| Alloa Athletic | 2017–18 | League One | 0 | 0 | 0 | 0 | 0 | 0 | 0 | 0 | 0 | 0 |
| Alloa Athletic | Total | | 7 | 0 | 1 | 0 | 0 | 0 | 2 | 0 | 10 | 0 |
| Career total | | | 6 | 0 | 1 | 0 | 0 | 0 | 2 | 0 | 9 | 0 |
