= Cătălin Păun =

Romanian association football player

Personal information
- Full name: Cătălin Valentin Păun
- Date of birth: 3 January 1988 (age 38)
- Place of birth: București, România
- Height: 1.84 m (6 ft 0 in)
- Position: Defender

Youth career
- 1997–2001: CSŞ 2 București
- 2001–2005: Rapid București

Senior career*
Years	Team	Apps	(Gls)
2009–2014	Rapid București	29	(1)
2009	→ Gloria Bistrita (loan)	10	(0)
2010–2011	→ Petrolul Ploiești (loan)	10	(0)
2011–2012	→ Juventus București (loan)	12	(0)
2014–2015	CS Balotești	8	(0)
2015–2016	Alloa Athletic	1	(0)
2016	CS Balotești	5	(0)

International career^{‡}
2009	Romania U-21	2	(0)
- * Club domestic league appearances and goals as of 6 June 2016 ‡ National team caps and goals as of 1 April 2009

Cătălin Valentin Păun (born 3 January 1988) is a Romanian professional footballer.

== Alloa Athletic ==
Alloa Athletic manager, Danny Lennon, signed Cătălin Păun after a successful trial period prior to the 2015–16 Scottish Championship season. Păun is employed at Stirling University and had been playing for Stirling University F.C. in the Scottish Lowland League.
