= Mark Williams (Scottish footballer) =

Scottish footballer

Personal information
- Date of birth: 15 May 1995 (age 31)
- Place of birth: Scotland
- Position: Defender

Senior career*
Years	Team	Apps	(Gls)
2014–2015	St Mirren	0	(0)
2015–2016	Alloa Athletic	12	(0)
2016	→ Arbroath (loan)	11	(1)
2016-2017	Linlithgow Rose		
- * Club domestic league appearances and goals

Mark Williams (born 15 May 1995) is a Scottish footballer who plays as a defender.

== Career ==
Williams began his career at St Mirren, being first included in a matchday squad for their 0–4 home defeat to Celtic on 5 January 2014. He was an unused substitute in this match, and ten more over the remainder of the season and the following campaign, never making a senior appearance.

After being released by St Mirren, Williams trialled at Scottish Championship club Alloa Athletic, where on 16 July 2015 he was given a one-year contract by his former St Mirren manager Danny Lennon. Nine days later he made his debut, playing the full 90 minutes as they won 1–0 at Highland League team Brora Rangers in the first round of the Scottish Challenge Cup. On 8 August he played his first league game, a 3–1 loss away to Queen of the South.

In February 2016, he moved on loan to Arbroath in Scottish League Two; on 12 March he scored his first career goal to conclude a 3–0 win over East Stirlingshire at Gayfield Park. However, after his loan spell ended and Alloa's relegation from the Scottish Championship, Williams was released by the club.

Williams last played for Linlithgow Rose in 2016-2017.
