= 2014–15 Scottish Championship =

Scottish Championship
- Season: 2014–15
- Champions: Heart of Midlothian
- Promoted: Heart of Midlothian
- Relegated: Cowdenbeath
- Matches: 180
- Goals: 525 (2.92 per match)
- Top goalscorer: Jason Cummings (19 goals)
- Biggest home win: Hearts 10–0 Cowdenbeath (28 February 2015)
- Biggest away win: Cowdenbeath 0–5 Queen of the South (21 January 2015)
- Highest scoring: Hearts 10–0 Cowdenbeath (28 February 2015)
- Longest winning run: 9 games Heart of Midlothian
- Longest unbeaten run: 20 games Heart of Midlothian
- Longest winless run: 12 games Alloa Athletic
- Longest losing run: 5 games Cowdenbeath; Livingston
- Highest attendance: 43,683; Rangers 1–2 Heart of Midlothian (10 August 2014)
- Lowest attendance: 549; Cowdenbeath 0–3 Alloa Athletic (23 August 2014)
- Average attendance: 7,532
- All statistics correct as of 31 March 2015.

The 2014–15 Scottish Championship is the 21st season in the current format of 10 teams in the second tier of Scottish football.

Heart of Midlothian won the title on 22 March 2015 and secured their return to the Scottish Premiership with a record seven matches remaining, after Rangers defeated city rivals Hibernian 2–0. This marked the first time since the 1984-85 season that a side in the same division as an Old Firm club won a league title in Scotland.

== Teams ==
Rangers were promoted as 2013–14 Scottish League One champions, whilst Heart of Midlothian were relegated from the 2013–14 Scottish Premiership. Hibernian finished 11th in the Premiership and were eventually relegated after a play-off against Hamilton Academical, losing a penalty shoot-out following a 2–2 draw on aggregate over two legs.

=== Stadia and locations ===
==== Stadia by capacity and locations ====
Alloa Athletic	Cowdenbeath	Dumbarton	Falkirk
Recreation Park	Central Park	Dumbarton Football Stadium	Falkirk Stadium
Capacity: 3,100	Capacity: 4,309	Capacity: 2,020	Capacity: 8,750
Rangers	2014–15 Scottish Championship is located in Scotland South		Heart of Midlothian
Ibrox Stadium	2014–15 Scottish Championship is located in Scotland South		Tynecastle Stadium
Capacity: 50,947	2014–15 Scottish Championship is located in Scotland South		Capacity: 17,529
Raith Rovers	Queen of the South	Livingston	Hibernian
Stark's Park	Palmerston Park	Almondvale Stadium	Easter Road
Capacity: 8,473	Capacity: 8,690	Capacity: 9,865	Capacity: 20,421

=== Personnel and kits ===
Team	Manager	Kit manufacturer	Shirt sponsor
Alloa Athletic	(Scotland) Danny Lennon	Pendle	Marshall Construction
Cowdenbeath	(Northern Ireland) Jimmy Nicholl	Uhlsport	Subsea Pressure Controls
Dumbarton	(Scotland) Ian Murray	Joma	Baxter Ramsay
Falkirk	(Scotland) Peter Houston	Puma	Central Demolition
Heart of Midlothian	(Scotland) Robbie Neilson	Adidas	Foundation of Hearts (A)
Hibernian	(England) Alan Stubbs	Nike	Marathonbet
Livingston	(Scotland) John McGlynn	Joma	Energy Assets
Queen of the South	(Scotland) James Fowler	Joma	Southwest Mechanical Services
Raith Rovers	(Scotland) Grant Murray	Puma	valmcdermid.com (H, front of shirt), Keytech Electronic Systems (H, back of shirt), D&G Autocare (A)
Rangers	(Scotland) Stuart McCall	Puma	32Red

=== Managerial changes ===
Team	Outgoing manager	Manner of departure	Date of vacancy	Position in table	Incoming manager	Date of appointment
Heart of Midlothian	(Scotland) Gary Locke	Mutual Consent	12 May 2014	Pre-season	(Scotland) Robbie Neilson	12 May 2014
Falkirk	(Scotland) Gary Holt	Resigned	2 June 2014	Pre-season	(Scotland) Peter Houston	12 June 2014
Hibernian	(England) Terry Butcher	Sacked	10 June 2014	Pre-season	(England) Alan Stubbs	24 June 2014
Queen of the South	(Scotland) Jim McIntyre	Appointed by Ross County	9 September 2014	4th	(Scotland) James Fowler	30 September 2014
Rangers	(Scotland) Ally McCoist	Resigned	15 December 2014	2nd	(Scotland) Stuart McCall	12 March 2015
Livingston	(Scotland) John McGlynn	Mutual Consent	16 December 2014	10th	(Scotland) Mark Burchill	16 December 2014
Alloa Athletic	(Scotland) Barry Smith	Resigned	7 March 2015	9th	(Scotland) Danny Lennon	7 April 2015

== League table ==
Pos	Team	Pld	W	D	L	GF	GA	GD	Pts	Promotion, qualification or relegation
1	Heart of Midlothian (C, P)	36	29	4	3	96	26	+70	91	Promotion to the Premiership
2	Hibernian	36	21	7	8	70	32	+38	70	Qualification for the Premiership play-off semi-final
3	Rangers	36	19	10	7	69	39	+30	67	Qualification for the Premiership play-off quarter-final
4	Queen of the South	36	17	9	10	58	41	+17	60	Qualification for the Premiership play-off quarter-final
5	Falkirk	36	14	11	11	48	48	0	53	
6	Raith Rovers	36	12	7	17	42	65	−23	43	
7	Dumbarton	36	9	7	20	36	79	−43	34	
8	Livingston (Note: Livingston were deducted 5 points due to failure of tax payments.)	36	8	8	20	41	53	−12	27	
9	Alloa Athletic (O)	36	6	9	21	34	56	−22	27	Qualification for the Championship play-offs
10	Cowdenbeath (R)	36	7	4	25	31	86	−55	25	Relegation to League One

Source: Soccerway
Rules for classification: 1) Points; 2) Goal difference; 3) Number of goals scored
(C) Champions; (O) Play-off winners; (P) Promoted; (R) Relegated

== Results ==
Teams play each other four times in this league. In the first half of the season each team plays every other team twice (home and away) and then do the same in the second half of the season, for a total of 36 games.

=== First half of season ===
Home \ Away	ALO	COW	DUM	FAL	HOM	HIB	LIV	QOS	RAI	RAN
Alloa Athletic		2–3	0–1	2–3	0–1	2–1	1–0	1–1	0–1	1–1
Cowdenbeath	0–3		1–3	2–2	0–2	1–2	1–0	2–1	1–3	0–3
Dumbarton	3–1	0–0		0–3	0–0	3–6	1–0	0–4	2–1	0–3
Falkirk	2–1	6–0	1–1		1–2	1–0	0–0	1–1	0–1	0–2
Heart of Midlothian	2–0	5–1	5–1	4–1		2–1	5–0	4–1	1–0	2–0
Hibernian	2–0	3–2	0–0	0–1	1–1		2–1	0–0	1–1	4–0
Livingston	4–0	2–1	1–2	0–1	0–1	0–4		2–2	0–1	0–1
Queen of the South	2–0	1–2	3–0	3–0	0–3	1–0	1–1		2–0	2–0
Raith Rovers	1–1	2–1	3–1	0–0	0–4	1–3	1–5	3–4		0–4
Rangers	1–1	1–0	4–1	4–0	1–2	1–3	2–0	4–2	6–1	

Updated to match(es) played on 27 December 2014. Source: BBC Sport
Legend: Blue = home team win; Yellow = draw; Red = away team win.

=== Second half of season ===
Home \ Away	ALO	COW	DUM	FAL	HOM	HIB	LIV	QOS	RAI	RAN
Alloa Athletic		3–0	3–0	1–3	1–4	0–1	2–2	2–2	0–0	0–1
Cowdenbeath	0–2		3–0	0–1	1–2	0–2	1–2	0–5	0–1	0–0
Dumbarton	1–0	1–2		1–0	1–5	1–2	1–5	0–0	2–2	1–3
Falkirk	1–0	1–0	3–3		0–3	0–3	2–0	1–1	1–0	1–1
Heart of Midlothian	3–0	10–0	4–0	2–3		1–1	1–0	2–0	2–1	2–2
Hibernian	4–1	5–0	3–0	3–3	2–0		2–1	0–1	1–1	0–2
Livingston	0–0	1–1	1–2	2–1	2–3	1–3		1–0	0–2	1–1
Queen of the South	1–0	4–1	2–1	1–0	1–2	0–2	3–1		2–1	3–0
Raith Rovers	2–1	1–3	2–1	2–2	1–3	2–1	0–4	3–0		1–2
Rangers	2–2	4–1	3–1	2–2	2–1	0–2	1–1	1–1	4–0	

Updated to match(es) played on 2 May 2015. Source: BBC Sport
Legend: Blue = home team win; Yellow = draw; Red = away team win.

== Championship play-offs ==
The second bottom team in the Championship enters into a 4 team playoff with the teams from 2nd to 4th from League One

=== Semi-finals ===
All times British Summer Time (UTC+1)

==== First leg ====
6 May 2015
19:45

Brechin City	0–2	Alloa Athletic
	Report	Chopra 56'; Benedictus 90'

Glebe Park, Brechin
Attendance: 505
Referee: Brian Colvin

6 May 2015
19:45

Forfar Athletic	3–0	Stranraer
Kader 61'; Swankie 87'; Hay 90'	Report

Station Park, Forfar
Attendance: 717
Referee: Stephen Finnie

==== Second leg ====
9 May 2015
15:00

Alloa Athletic	0–1	Brechin City
	Report	Trouten 80'

Recreation Park, Alloa
Attendance: 606
Referee: Crawford Allan

Alloa win 2-1 on aggregate

9 May 2015
15:00

Stranraer	1–1	Forfar Athletic
Aitken 41' (pen.)	Report	Swankie 53' (pen.)

Stair Park, Stranraer
Attendance: 519
Referee: Bobby Madden

Forfar win 4-1 on aggregate

=== Final ===
The two semi-final winners enter a two-legged play-off, the winner of which is awarded a place in the 2015–16 Scottish Championship.

==== First leg ====
13 May 2015
19:45

Forfar Athletic	3–1	Alloa Athletic
Kader 10'; Templeman 57'; Travis 90'	Report	Benedictus 82'

Station Park, Forfar
Attendance: 1,212
Referee: Kevin Graham

==== Second leg ====
17 May 2015
17:30

Alloa Athletic	3–0	Forfar Athletic
Chopra 45'; Buchanan 67'; Holmes (red card) 74'; Meggatt 84'	Report

Recreation Park, Alloa
Attendance: 1,423
Referee: Willie Collum

Alloa win 4-3 on aggregate

== Top scorers ==
Rank	Scorer	Club	Goals
1	(Australia) Jason Cummings	Hibernian	19
2	(Scotland) Derek Lyle	Queen of the South	15
3	(Scotland) Liam Buchanan	Alloa Athletic	14
4	(Republic of the Congo) Dominique Malonga	Hibernian	13
5	(Scotland) Gavin Reilly	Queen of the South	12
5	(Netherlands) Género Zeefuik	Heart of Midlothian	12
7	(Scotland) Jordan White	Livingston	11
7	(Scotland) James Keatings	Heart of Midlothian	11
9	(England) Nicky Law	Rangers	10
9	(Scotland) Mark Stewart	Raith Rovers	10
9	(Scotland) Danny Mullen	Livingston	10
9	(Scotland) Jamie Walker	Heart of Midlothian	10
