= Graeme Holmes =

Scottish footballer (born 1984)

Personal information
- Date of birth: 26 March 1984 (age 42)
- Place of birth: Motherwell, Scotland
- Position: Midfielder

Team information
- Current team: Alloa Athletic (Assistant)

Youth career
- Dundee United Youths

Senior career*
Years	Team	Apps	(Gls)
2003–2005	Dundee United	3	(0)
2004–2005	→Dumbarton (loan)	12	(1)
2005–2008	Airdrie United	69	(5)
2008–2010	Dunfermline Athletic	24	(0)
2010–2011	Greenock Morton	25	(0)
2011–2017	Alloa Athletic	185	(15)
2017–2018	Albion Rovers	29	(0)
2018–2020	East Kilbride	?	(?)
2020	Edinburgh City	5	(0)
2021	Forfar Athletic	10	(0)
2021–2024	Cumbernauld Colts	?	(?)
- * Club domestic league appearances and goals as of 13:00, 25 July (UTC)

Graeme Holmes (born 26 March 1984) is a Scottish retired footballer who played as a midfielder now working as assistant manager at old club Alloa Athletic.

== Career ==
Holmes began his career with Dundee United but made only four appearances (three in the league), all as a substitute. A loan spell at Dumbarton for the first part of the 2004–05 season brought him twelve games, but he played no further matches on his return to Tannadice and was released in September 2005. Two months later, he signed for Airdrie Utd.

In May 2008, Holmes left Airdrie to join Scottish First Division side Dunfermline Athletic joining up with manager Jim McIntyre, whom he played with while at Dundee United.

Unfortunately injury affected his time at the Pars and he was released at the end of the 2009–10 season, moving on to Greenock Morton, where his father Jim Holmes is considered a legend.

Holmes was released in May 2011, after one season at Morton. Within a month, Holmes had signed for relegated Alloa Athletic in the Scottish Football League Third Division. Holmes spent six years with Alloa, before signing for fellow Scottish League One side Albion Rovers on 2 June 2017.

Holmes signed for Lowland League team East Kilbride after his spell with Albion Rovers before moving to Edinburgh City in January 2020.

== Personal life ==
Graeme's father, Jimmy Holmes was also a footballer who played professionally for Partick Thistle, Morton, Falkirk, Alloa and Arbroath.

== Career statistics ==
As of 20 April 2015

Club	Season	League		Cup		League Cup		Other^{[A]}		Total	
Club	Season	Apps	Goals	Apps	Goals	Apps	Goals	Apps	Goals	Apps	Goals
Dundee United	2003–04	3	0	1	0	0	0	0	0	4	0
Dundee United	2004–05	0	0	0	0	0	0	0	0	0	0
Dundee United	Total	3	0	1	0	0	0	0	0	4	0
Dumbarton (loan)	2004–05	12	1	0	0	0	0	0	0	12	1
Airdrie United	2005–06	15	0	2	0	0	0	0	0	17	0
Airdrie United	2006–07	35	3	1	0	2	0	3	0	41	3
Airdrie United	2007–08	19	2	2	0	1	0	7	0	29	2
Airdrie United	Total	69	5	5	0	3	0	10	0	87	5
Dunfermline Athletic	2008–09	7	0	1	1	1	0	0	0	9	1
Dunfermline Athletic	2009–10	17	0	2	0	2	0	1	0	22	0
Dunfermline Athletic	Total	24	0	3	1	3	0	1	0	31	1
Greenock Morton	2010–11	25	0	1	0	1	0	0	0	27	0
Alloa Athletic	2011–12	34	3	0	0	1	0	1	0	36	3
Alloa Athletic	2012–13	33	8	1	0	1	0	5	0	40	8
Alloa Athletic	2013–14	34	2	3	1	2	0	1	0	40	3
Alloa Athletic	2014–15	30	0	1	0	2	0	4	0	37	0
Alloa Athletic	Total	131	13	5	1	6	0	11	0	153	14
Career total		242	13	14	2	11	0	17	0	284	15

A. The "Other" column constitutes appearances (including substitutes) and goals in the Scottish Challenge Cup, 2006–07 Scottish First Division play-offs, 2007–08 Scottish First Division play-offs & 2012–13 Scottish First Division play-offs.

== Honours ==
- Scottish Third Division: 2011–12
