= 2011–12 Montrose F.C. season =

Montrose
2011–12 season
- Chairman: Derek Sim
- Manager: Ray Farningham
- Stadium: Links Park
- Scottish Third Division: Eighth
- Challenge Cup: Round One
- League Cup: Round One
- Scottish Cup: Round Three
- Top goalscorer: League: Martin Boyle (22); All: Martin Boyle (22)
- Highest home attendance: 246 vs. Annan Athletic, 4 February 2012
- Lowest home attendance: 450 vs. Clyde, 5 May 2012

The 2011–12 season was Montrose's sixth consecutive season in the Scottish Third Division, the team having been relegated from the Scottish Second Division at the end of the 1995–96 season. Montrose also competed in the Challenge Cup, League Cup and the Scottish Cup.

== Summary ==
Montrose finished eighth in the Third Division. They reached the first round of the Challenge Cup, the first round of the League Cup and the third round of the Scottish Cup.

== Results & fixtures ==
Win Draw Loss Postponed

=== Third Division ===
6 August 2011 Scottish Third Division	East Stirlingshire	1–0	Montrose	Ochilview Park
15:00	Jackson 79' (pen.)	BBC Report	Smart (red card) 77'	Attendance: 282; Referee: Cook

13 August 2011 Scottish Third Division	Montrose	3–0	Elgin City	Links Park
	Boyle 11' 36'; Crawford 50' (pen.)	BBC Report		Attendance: 349; Referee: Robertson

20 August 2011 Scottish Third Division	Clyde	1–0	Montrose	Broadwood Stadium
15:00	McDonald 50'	BBC Report		Attendance: 757; Referee: Clancy

27 August 2011 Scottish Third Division	Montrose	0–6	Stranraer	Links Park
	Smart (red card) 59'	BBC Report	McColm 38', 42'; Aitken 46'; Moore 68', 79'; Malcolm 72'	Attendance: 302; Referee: Aitken

10 September 2011 Scottish Third Division	Berwick Rangers	1–2	Montrose	Shielfield Park
	McLaren 11'; Townsley (red card) 80'	BBC Report	Winter 23'; Pierce 81' (pen.); Masson (yellow card) 81' (red card)	Attendance: 368; Referee: Roache

17 September 2011 Scottish Third Division	Montrose	2–3	Annan Athletic	Links Park
15:00	Boyle 13' 44'	BBC Report	Gibson 16', 84'; McKechnie 90'	Attendance: 308; Referee: Beaton

24 September 2011 Scottish Third Division	Alloa Athletic	4–2	Montrose	Recreation Park
15:00	McCord 4' (pen.); Cawley 28', 79'; Gordon 51'	SFL Report	Campbell 27'; Boyle 37'	Attendance: 461; Referee: Robertson

1 October 2011 Scottish Third Division	Montrose	2–1	Peterhead	Links Park
15:00	Masson 41'; Boyle 66'	BBC Report	McAllister 12'	Attendance: 359; Referee: Colvin

15 October 2011 Scottish Third Division	Queen's Park	3–1	Montrose	Hampden Park
	Daly 55'; Longworth 81', 87'	SFL Report	Boyle 30'	Attendance: 529; Referee: Aitken

29 October 2011 Scottish Third Division	Elgin City	P – P	Montrose	Borough Briggs
15:00

5 November 2011 Scottish Third Division	Montrose	2–1	East Stirlingshire	Links Park
15:00	Johnston 2'; Smart 60'	SFL Report	Stirling 13'	Attendance: 315; Referee: Graham

8 November 2011 Scottish Third Division	Elgin City	3–1	Montrose	Borough Briggs
19:30	O'Donoghue 10', 17'; Crooks 66'	SFL Report	Johnston 29'	Attendance: 461; Referee: Northcroft

12 November 2011 Scottish Third Division	Stranraer	4–4	Montrose	Stair Park
15:00	Winter 7'; Malcolm 18', 19'; Martin Grehan 53')Mitchell (red card) 63'	SFL Report	Pierce 64', 69'; Winter 70', 74'	Attendance: 326; Referee: Don Robertson

26 November 2011 Scottish Third Division	Montrose	3–5	Berwick Rangers	Links Park
15:00	Boyle 9'; Lunan 50'; Cameron 86'	SFL Report	Gribben 20', 25'; Noble 60', 79'; Gray 90'	Attendance: 328; Referee: Clancy

3 December 2011 Scottish Third Division	Montrose	1–1	Alloa Athletic	Links Park
15:00	Johnston 15'	SFL Report	Gordon 79'	Attendance: 313; Referee: Dallas

10 December 2011 Scottish Third Division	Annan Athletic	2–1	Montrose	Galabank
15:00	O'Connor 33', 35'; Muirhead (red card) 53'	Report	Winter 54' (Penalty)	Attendance: 402; Referee: Aitken

17 December 2011 Scottish Third Division	Montrose	P – P	Queen's Park	Links Park
15:00

26 December 2011 Scottish Third Division	Peterhead	2–3	Montrose	Balmoor Stadium
15:00	Strachan 74'; Bavidge 90'	SFL Report	Strachan 15' (Own Goal); McGowan 62'; Crawford 90'	Attendance: 566; Referee: Northcroft

2 January 2012 Scottish Third Division	Berwick Rangers	2–2	Montrose	Shielfield Park
15:00	Deland 15'; Greenhill 62'	SFL Report	Johnston 45'; Boyle 58'	Attendance: 455; Referee: Anderson

7 January 2012 Scottish Third Division	Montrose	1–3	Stranraer	Links Park
15:00	Boyle 3'	SFL Report	Winter 38', 83'; Malcolm 73'	Attendance: 257; Referee: Barry Cook

14 January 2012 Scottish Third Division	Montrose	4–0	Clyde	Links Park
15:00	McGowan 51'; Johnston 53'; Winter 75'; McNally 90'	SFL Report		Attendance: 365; Referee: Graham

21 January 2012 Scottish Third Division	East Stirlingshire	3–1	Montrose	Ochilview Park
15:00	Lurinsky 38', 49'; Turner 55'	SFL Report	Winter 59'	Attendance: 248; Referee: Robertson

28 January 2012 Scottish Third Division	Alloa Athletic	2–0	Montrose	Recreation Park
15:00	McKinnon 87'; May 90'	SFL Report		Attendance: 508; Referee: Roache

4 February 2012 Scottish Third Division	Montrose	1–1	Annan Athletic	Links Park
15:00	Winter 45'; Cameron (red card) 77'	SFL Report	Muirhead 78' (Penalty)	Attendance: 246; Referee: Robertson

11 February 2012 Scottish Third Division	Queen's Park	5–0	Montrose	Hampden Park
15:00	Longworth 5', 77'; McBride 50'; Daly 63'; Quinn 90'	SFL Report		Attendance: 426; Referee: Anderson

18 February 2012 Scottish Third Division	Montrose	1–3	Peterhead	Links Park
15:00	Boyle 62'	SFL Report	Webster 32'; Ross 51'; Bavidge 54'	Attendance: 358; Referee: Aitken

25 February 2012 Scottish Third Division	Montrose	2–3	Elgin City	Links Park
15:00	Masson 29'; Boyle 51'	SFL Report	Gunn 6', 42', 70'	Attendance: 401; Referee: Graham

28 February 2012 Scottish Third Division	Montrose	0–1	Queen's Park	Links Park
19:45	Lunan (red card) 74'	SFL Report	Longworth 89'	Attendance: 303; Referee: Robertson

3 March 2012 Scottish Third Division	Clyde	1–2	Montrose	Broadwood Stadium
15:00	Crighton 54' (Own Goal)	SFL Report	Cameron 50'; Boyle 64'	Attendance: 476; Referee: Dallas

10 March 2012 Scottish Third Division	Montrose	1–1	Berwick Rangers	Links Park
15:00	Boyle 49'	SFL Report	Gray 80'	Attendance: 318; Referee: Beaton

17 March 2012 Scottish Third Division	Stranraer	3–1	Montrose	Stair Park
15:00	Moore 58'; Malcolm 65', 90'	SFL Report	Boyle 45'; Smart (yellow card) 91' (red card)	Attendance: 287; Referee: Hilland

24 March 2012 Scottish Third Division	Annan Athletic	1–2	Montrose	Galabank
15:00	Muirhead 27' (Penalty)	SFL Report	Wood 5'; Winter 43' (Penalty)	Attendance: 418; Referee: Aitken

31 March 2012 Scottish Third Division	Montrose	0–2	Alloa Athletic	Links Park
15:00	Campbell (red card) 79'	SFL Report	Harding (red card) 19'; McCord 80' (pen.), 83'	Attendance: 390; Referee: Northcroft

7 April 2012 Scottish Third Division	Peterhead	2–1	Montrose	Balmoor Stadium
15:00	McAllister 9', 65'	SFL Report	Crawford 55'	Attendance: 458; Referee: Somers

14 April 2012 Scottish Third Division	Montrose	3–1	Queen's Park	Links Park
15:00	Crighton 41'; Boyle 51'; Winter 63'	SFL Report	Quinn 25'	Attendance: 336; Referee: Tumilty

21 April 2012 Scottish Third Division	Montrose	3–1	East Stirlingshire	Links Park
15:00	Boyle 24', 83'; Wood 72'	SFL Report	Turner 15'	Attendance: 329; Referee: Graham

28 April 2012 Scottish Third Division	Elgin City	2–1	Montrose	Borough Briggs
15:00	Gunn 35'; Macphee 56'	SFL Report	Boyle 75'	Attendance: 901; Referee: Dallas

5 May 2012 Scottish Third Division	Montrose	5–0	Clyde	Links Park
15:00	Boyle 20', 41', 75'; Masson 54'; Cambell 72'	SFL Report		Attendance: 450; Referee: Robertson

=== Challenge Cup ===
23 July 2011 Challenge Cup round 1	Montrose	1–6	East Fife	Links Park
	McPhee 73'	SFL Report	Linn 16'; Ogleby 27', 51', 63' (pen.); Wallace 31'; Young 64'	Attendance: 404; Referee: Anderson

=== Scottish League Cup ===
30 July 2011 Scottish League Cup round 1	Montrose	1–4	Raith Rovers	Links Park
15:00	Winter 20'; Smart (yellow card) 62' (red card); McNally (red card) 65'	BBC Report	Williamson 31'; Walker 52'; Baird 54'; Thomson 77'	Attendance: 614; Referee: Colvin

=== Scottish Cup ===
22 October 2011 Scottish Cup round 2	Montrose	2–1	Clyde	Links Park
15:00	Lunan 23'; Pierce 49'	Montrose Report	Neil 19'	Attendance: 452; Referee: Robertson

19 November 2011 Scottish Cup round 3	Ayr United	2–2	Montrose	Somerset Park
15:00	Robertson 10'; Trouten 55' (Penalty)	BBC Report	Masson 24'; Winter 57' (Penalty)	Attendance: 988; Referee: Northcroft

22 November 2011 Scottish Cup round 3 Replay	Montrose	1–2	Ayr United	Links Park
	Winter 81'	Sky Report	Trouten 28', 73'	Referee: Northcroft

== Player statistics ==
=== Squad ===
Last updated 5 May 2012

No.	Pos	Nat	Player	Total		Third Division		Scottish Cup		League Cup		Challenge Cup	
No.	Pos	Nat	Player	Apps	Goals	Apps	Goals	Apps	Goals	Apps	Goals	Apps	Goals
	GK	(Scotland) SCO	Michael Andrews	30	0	25	0	3	0	1	0	1	0
	GK	(Scotland) SCO	Sandy Wood	11	0	11	0	0	0	0	0	0	0
	DF	(Scotland) SCO	Dougie Cameron	39	2	34	2	3	0	1	0	1	0
	DF	(Scotland) SCO	Alan Campbell	31	2	28	2	1	0	1	0	1	0
	DF	(Scotland) SCO	Sean Crighton	31	1	26	1	3	0	1	0	1	0
	DF	(Scotland) SCO	Jonathan Smart	27	1	22	1	3	0	1	0	1	0
	DF	(Scotland) SCO	Kevin Brown	1	0	1	0	0	0	0	0	0	0
	MF	(Scotland) SCO	Jonathan Crawford	30	3	28	3	1	0	0	0	1	0
	MF	(Scotland) SCO	David Dimilta	9	0	6	0	1	0	1	0	1	0
	MF	(Scotland) SCO	Paul Lunan	26	2	22	1	3	1	1	0	0	0
	MF	(Scotland) SCO	Terry Masson	37	4	32	3	3	1	1	0	1	0
	MF	(Scotland) SCO	Stephen McNally	33	1	29	1	2	0	1	0	1	0
	MF	(Scotland) SCO	Steven McPhee	24	1	21	0	2	0	0	0	1	1
	MF	(Scotland) SCO	Jamie Winter	37	11	33	9	3	1	1	1	0	0
	MF	(Scotland) SCO	Steven Masterton	1	0	1	0	0	0	0	0	0	0
	MF	(Scotland) SCO	Lloyd Young	22	0	22	0	0	0	0	0	0	0
	FW	(Scotland) SCO	Martin Boyle	41	22	36	22	3	0	1	0	1	0
	FW	(Scotland) SCO	Scott Johnston	37	5	32	5	3	0	1	0	1	0
	FW	(Scotland) SCO	David McGowan	18	2	15	2	1	0	1	0	1	0
	FW	(Scotland) SCO	Sean Pierce	19	4	14	3	3	1	1	0	1	0
	FW	(Scotland) SCO	Garry Wood	16	2	16	2	0	0	0	0	0	0

=== Disciplinary record ===
Includes all competitive matches.

Last updated 5 May 2012

Nation	Position	Name	Third Division		Scottish Cup		League Cup		Challenge Cup		Total	
Nation	Position	Name	Booked	Sent off (straight red)	Booked	Sent off (straight red)	Booked	Sent off (straight red)	Booked	Sent off (straight red)	Booked	Sent off (straight red)
(Scotland)	GK	Michael Andrews	1	0	0	0	0	0	0	0	1	0
(Scotland)	GK	Sandy Wood	0	0	0	0	0	0	0	0	0	0
(Scotland)	DF	Dougie Cameron	6	1	1	0	1	0	0	0	7	1
(Scotland)	DF	Alan Campbell	3	1	0	0	0	0	0	0	3	1
(Scotland)	DF	Sean Crighton	5	0	0	0	0	0	0	0	5	0
(Scotland)	DF	Jonathan Smart	1	3	1	0	1	1	0	0	3	4
(Scotland)	DF	Kevin Brown	0	0	0	0	0	0	0	0	0	0
(Scotland)	MF	Jonathan Crawford	6	0	0	0	0	0	1	0	7	0
(Scotland)	MF	David Dimilta	0	0	0	0	0	0	0	0	0	0
(Scotland)	MF	Paul Lunan	5	2	0	0	0	0	0	0	5	2
(Scotland)	MF	Terry Masson	7	1	0	0	0	0	0	0	7	1
(Scotland)	MF	Stephen McNally	8	0	1	0	0	1	0	0	9	1
(Scotland)	MF	Steven McPhee	0	0	0	0	0	0	0	0	0	0
(Scotland)	MF	Steven Masterton	0	0	0	0	0	0	0	0	0	0
(Scotland)	MF	Jamie Winter	9	0	1	0	1	0	0	0	11	0
(Scotland)	MF	Lloyd Young	1	0	0	0	0	0	0	0	1	0
(Scotland)	FW	Martin Boyle	3	0	0	0	0	0	0	0	3	0
(Scotland)	FW	Scott Johnston	4	0	1	0	0	0	0	0	5	0
(Scotland)	FW	David McGowan	1	0	0	0	0	0	0	0	1	0
(Scotland)	FW	Sean Pierce	1	0	0	0	0	0	0	0	1	0
(Scotland)	FW	Garry Wood	2	0	0	0	0	0	0	0	2	0

=== Awards ===
Last updated 28 September 2012

Nation	Name	Award	Month
(Scotland)	Martin Boyle	Phenomenal Ginger Boot Award	IRN-BRU SFL End of Season Awards

== League table ==
Pos	Team	Pld	W	D	L	GF	GA	GD	Pts
6	Annan Athletic	36	13	10	13	53	53	0	49
7	Berwick Rangers	36	12	12	12	61	58	+3	48
8	Montrose	36	11	5	20	58	75	−17	38
9	Clyde	36	8	11	17	35	50	−15	35
10	East Stirlingshire	36	6	6	24	38	88	−50	24

Source: SPFL Archive
Rules for classification: 1) points; 2) goal difference; 3) number of goals scored.

== Transfers ==
=== Players in ===
Player	From	Fee
(Scotland) Jonathan Smart	(Scotland) East Fife	Free
(Scotland) Jamie Winter	(Scotland) Broughty Athletic	Free
(Scotland) David Dimilta	(Scotland) Arbroath	Free
(Scotland) David McGowan	(Scotland) Arbroath	Free
(Scotland) Michael Andrews	(Scotland) Falkirk	Free
(Scotland) Steven McPhee	(Scotland) Arbroath Sporting Club	Free
(Scotland) Sean Kelly	(Scotland) Dundee North End	Free
(Scotland) Paul Lunan	(Scotland) Dundee Violet	Free
(Scotland) Scott Johnston	(Scotland) East Stirlingshire	Free
(Scotland) Lloyd Young	(Scotland) East Fife	Loan
(Scotland) Lloyd Young	(Scotland) East Fife	Free
(Scotland) Garry Wood	(Scotland) Ross County	Free
(Scotland) Kevin Brown	(Scotland) Arbroath	Loan

=== Players out ===
Player	To	Fee
(Scotland) Aaron Sinclair	(Scotland) Montrose	Undisclosed
(Scotland) Chris Hegarty	(Scotland) Forfar Athletic	Free
(Scotland) Fraser Milligan	(Scotland) Tayport	Free
(Scotland) Nicky Smith	(Scotland) Arbroath Victoria	Free
(Scotland) Conor Thomson	(Scotland) Penicuik Athletic	Free
(Scotland) Paul Tosh	(Scotland) Tayport	Free
(Scotland) Gordon Pope	(Scotland) Auchinleck Talbot	Free
(Argentina) Ramiro González (footballer, born 1980)	Free agent	Free
(Scotland) Daryl Nicol	Free agent	Free
(Scotland) Sean Pierce	(Scotland) Albion Rovers	Free
(Scotland) Simon Murray	(Scotland) Tayport	Undisclosed
(Scotland) Steven McPhee	(Scotland) Downfield	Loan
