= 2011–12 East Stirlingshire F.C. season =

East Stirlingshire
2011–12 season
- Chairman: Les Thomson
- Head coach: John Coughlin
- Stadium: Ochilview Park
- Scottish Third Division: 10th
- Challenge Cup: First round
- League Cup: First round
- Scottish Cup: Third round
- Top goalscorer: League: Kevin Turner (6); All: Andy Stirling (7); Kevin Turner (7)
- Highest home attendance: 531 (v Alloa Athletic, 2 January 2012)
- Lowest home attendance: 215 (v Annan Athletic, 3 December 2011)

The 2011–12 season was East Stirlingshire's eighteenth consecutive season in the Scottish Third Division, having been relegated from the Scottish Second Division at the end of the 1993–94 season, following league reconstruction. East Stirlingshire also competed in the Challenge Cup, League Cup and the Scottish Cup.

== Summary ==
East Stirlingshire finished tenth in the Third Division. They reached the first round of the Challenge Cup, the first round of the League Cup and the third round of the Scottish Cup.

== Results & fixtures ==
Win Draw Loss Postponed

=== Third Division ===
6 August 2011 Third Division	East Stirlingshire	1–0	Montrose	Ochilview Park
15:00	Jackson 79' (pen.)	BBC Report	Smart (red card) 77'	Attendance: 282; Referee: Cook

13 August 2011 Third Division	Berwick Rangers	4–2	East Stirlingshire	Shielfield Park
15:00	Currie 9' (pen.), 90'; Gray 50'; McLaren 71'	BBC Report	Jackson (red card) 71'; Love 75' (pen.); Gibson 88'	Attendance: 441; Referee: Dallas

20 August 2011 Third Division	East Stirlingshire	0–2	Peterhead	Ochilview Park
15:00		BBC Report	Deasley 38'; McAllister 68' (pen.)	Attendance: 287; Referee: Colvin

27 August 2011 Third Division	Elgin City	2–0	East Stirlingshire	Borough Briggs
15:00	Gunn 30', 81'	SFL Report		Attendance: 578; Referee: Roache

10 September 2011 Third Division	East Stirlingshire	0–1	Alloa Athletic	Ochilview Park
15:00		BBC Report	Gordon 45'	Attendance: 419; Referee: Aitken

17 September 2011 Third Division	East Stirlingshire	1–3	Stranraer	Ochilview Park
15:00	Stirling 19'; Stirling (yellow card) 72' (red card)	BBC Report	Noble 12'; McColm 70'; Moore 90'	Attendance: 271; Referee: Clancy

24 September 2011 Third Division	Annan Athletic	3–0	East Stirlingshire	Galabank
15:00	Sloan 10'; Cox 25', 33'	BBC Report		Attendance: 511; Referee: Conroy

1 October 2011 Third Division	East Stirlingshire	1–3	Queen's Park	Ochilview Park
15:00	Love 89'	BBC Report	Little (red card) 39'; Watt 54'; Murray 80'; McBride 83'	Attendance: 384; Referee: Anderson

15 October 2011 Third Division	Clyde	7–1	East Stirlingshire	Broadwood Stadium
	McDonald 14'; Brown 19'; Neil 31'; Gallagher 77'; Oliver 81'; Cusack 82'; Archdeacon 90'	SFL Report	Coyne 82'	Attendance: 617; Referee: Robertson

29 October 2011 Third Division	East Stirlingshire	P – P	Berwick Rangers	Ochilview Park
15:00

5 November 2011 Third Division	Montrose	2–1	East Stirlingshire	Links Park
15:00	Johnston 2'; Smart 60'	SFL Report	Stirling 13'	Attendance: 315; Referee: Graham

9 November 2011 Third Division	East Stirlingshire	1–3	Berwick Rangers	Ochilview Park
19:45	Coyne 17'	SFL Report	Gribben 7', 66' (Penalty); McLean 31'	Attendance: 310; Referee: Dallas

12 November 2011 Third Division	East Stirlingshire	1–1	Elgin City	Ochilview Park
19:45	Coyne 40'; Love (yellow card) 78' (red card)	SFL Report	Gunn 1'	Attendance: 234; Referee: Anderson

26 November 2011 Third Division	Alloa Athletic	1–1	East Stirlingshire	Recreation Park
15:00	Campbell 83'	SFL Report	Hunter 65'	Attendance: 421; Referee: McKendrick

3 December 2011 Third Division	East Stirlingshire	1–0	Annan Athletic	Ochilview Park
19:45	Coyne 39'	SFL Report		Attendance: 215; Referee: Robertson

10 December 2011 Third Division	Stranraer	6–0	East Stirlingshire	Stair Park
15:00	Stirling 30' (Penalty), 32'; Winter 33'; McColm 58'; Taggart 63'; Moore 83'	SFL Report		Attendance: 276; Referee: Roache

17 December 2011 Third Division	East Stirlingshire	1–1	Clyde	Ochilview Park
15:00	Turner 45'	BBC Report	Cusack 92'	Attendance: 490; Referee: Barry Cook

24 December 2011 Third Division	Queen's Park	2–0	East Stirlingshire	Hampden Park
15:00	Watt 38'; Smith 67'	SFL Report		Attendance: 504; Referee: Aitken

2 January 2012 Third Division	East Stirlingshire	1–3	Alloa Athletic	Ochilview Park
15:00	Beveridge 6'	SFL Report	May 2', 46', 74'	Attendance: 531; Referee: Northcroft

7 January 2012 Third Division	Elgin City	3–1	East Stirlingshire	Borough Briggs
15:00	Leslie 43'; MacPhee 73'; Crooks 90'	SFL Report	Coyne 45' (Penalty)	Attendance: 531; Referee: Somers

14 January 2012 Third Division	Peterhead	1–0	East Stirlingshire	Balmoor Stadium
15:00	Wyness 35'	SFL Report		Attendance: 451; Referee: Anderson

21 January 2012 Third Division	East Stirlingshire	3–1	Montrose	Ochilview Park
15:00	Lurinsky 38', 49'; Turner 55'	SFL Report	Winter 59'	Attendance: 248; Referee: Robertson

28 January 2012 Third Division	Annan Athletic	2–2	East Stirlingshire	Galabank
15:00	Winters 5'; Steele 57'	SFL Report	Maxwell 12'; Lurinsky 24'	Attendance: 401; Referee: Barry Cook

4 February 2012 Third Division	East Stirlingshire	2–2	Stranraer	Ochilview Park
15:00	Maxwell 3'; Horner 45'	SFL Report	Stirling 33'; Aitken 89' (Penalty)	Attendance: 275; Referee: Conroy

11 February 2012 Third Division	Clyde	3–0	East Stirlingshire	Broadwood Stadium
15:00	Sweeney 19' (Penalty); Sloss 46'; Neill 66'	SFL Report		Attendance: 507; Referee: Graham

18 February 2012 Third Division	East Stirlingshire	1–2	Queen's Park	Ochilview Park
15:00	Maxwell 74'	SFL Report	Longworth 79', 90'	Attendance: 346; Referee: McKendrick

25 February 2012 Third Division	Berwick Rangers	0–2	East Stirlingshire	Shielfield Park
15:00		SFL Report	Dingwall 40'; Turner 84'	Attendance: 349; Referee: Robertson

3 March 2012 Third Division	East Stirlingshire	6–3	Peterhead	Ochilview Park
15:00	Hunter 10'; Devlin 23'; Lurinsky 33' (Penalty); Maxwell 38'; Stirling 41', 90'; Maxwell (yellow card) 62' (red card)	SFL Report	Sharp 1'; MacDonald 50'; McBain 57'; MacDonald (red card) 94'	Attendance: 277; Referee: Beaton

10 March 2012 Third Division	Alloa Athletic	5–1	East Stirlingshire	Recreation Park
15:00	Winters 26'; May 43'; Harding 60'; McCord 72'; Campbell 81'	SFL Report	Lurinsky 1'	Attendance: 579; Referee: Barry Cook

17 March 2012 Third Division	East Stirlingshire	2–2	Elgin City	Ochilview Park
15:00	Turner 7'; Stirling 58'; Frances (yellow card) 83' (red card)	SFL Report	Niven 41'; MacPhee 84' (Penalty); Durnan (yellow card) 90' (red card)	Attendance: 264; Referee: Anderson

24 March 2012 Third Division	Stranraer	4–1	East Stirlingshire	Stair Park
15:00	Malcolm 9'; Moore 17'; Devlin 45' (Own goal); Stirling 52'	SFL Report	Turner 90'	Attendance: 304; Referee: Dallas

31 March 2012 Third Division	East Stirlingshire	0–4	Annan Athletic	Ochilview Park
15:00		SFL Report	Bell 5'; McGowan 62'; Steele 70'; Underwood 83'	Attendance: 235; Referee: Hilland

7 April 2012 Third Division	Queen's Park	5–1	East Stirlingshire	Hampden Park
15:00	Longworth 32'; Quinn 49', 57'; Burns 67'; McBride 88' (Penalty)	SFL Report	Ramage 79'; Devlin (yellow card) 84' (red card)	Attendance: 477; Referee: Markham-Jones

14 April 2012 Third Division	East Stirlingshire	0–1	Clyde	Ochilview Park
15:00		SFL Report	Neil 76'	Attendance: 434; Referee: Northcroft

21 April 2012 Third Division	Montrose	3–1	East Stirlingshire	Links Park
15:00	Boyle 24', 83'; Wood 72'	SFL Report	Turner 15'	Attendance: 329; Referee: Graham

28 April 2012 Third Division	East Stirlingshire	2–1	Berwick Rangers	Ochilview Park
15:00	Horner 6'; Sheerin 18'; Frances (yellow card) 70' (red card)	SFL Report	Notman (red card) 52'; Currie 70' (Penalty)	Attendance: 277; Referee: Aitken

5 May 2012 Third Division	Peterhead	2–0	East Stirlingshire	Balmoor Stadium
15:00	Redman 12'; Ross 50'	SFL Report		Attendance: 494; Referee: Robertson

=== Challenge Cup ===
24 July 2011 First round	Dumbarton	3–2	East Stirlingshire	Strathclyde Homes Stadium
	Prunty 54'; Gilhaney 61' (pen.); Walker 90'	BBC Report	Love 66'; Turner 70'	Attendance: 454; Referee: Robertson

=== League Cup ===
30 July 2011 First round	East Stirlingshire	0–3	Ayr United	Ochilview Park
15:00		BBC Report	39' Trouten; 45', 52' Roberts	Attendance: 535; Referee: Anderson

=== Scottish Cup ===
23 October 2011 Round 2 replay	East Stirlingshire	1–1	Buckie Thistle	Ochilview Park
15:00	Stirling 48'; Frances (yellow card) 90' (red card); Cane (red card) 90'	Sky Report	Hunter 53' (Own Goal)	Attendance: 372; Referee: Barry Cook

29 October 2011 Round 2 replay	Buckie Thistle	2–4 (a.e.t.)	East Stirlingshire	Victoria Park
15:00	MacMillan 51'; Chrisholm 59'	Sky Report	Stirling 3'; Coyne 30'; Gibson 94'; Team 113'	Attendance: 500; Referee: Barry Cook

19 November 2011 Scottish Cup round 3	East Fife	5–0	East Stirlingshire	Bayview Stadium, Methil
15:00	Ogleby 13', 44'; Wallace 49'; Linn 71'; Sloan 79'	BBC Report		Attendance: 585; Referee: Aitken

== Player statistics ==
=== Squad ===
Last updated 5 May 2012

No.	Pos	Nat	Player	Total		Third Division		Scottish Cup		League Cup		Challenge Cup	
No.	Pos	Nat	Player	Apps	Goals	Apps	Goals	Apps	Goals	Apps	Goals	Apps	Goals
	GK	(Wales) WAL	Calum Antell	39	0	35	0	3	0	0	0	1	0
	GK	(Scotland) SCO	Craig Gordon	1	0	1	0	0	0	0	0	0	0
	GK	(Scotland) SCO	Grant Hay	1	0	1	0	0	0	0	0	0	0
	GK	(Scotland) SCO	Gavin Sorley	1	0	0	0	0	0	1	0	0	0
	DF	(England) ENG	David Cane (footballer)	30	0	26	0	2	0	1	0	1	0
	DF	(Scotland) SCO	Iain Chisholm	25	0	20	0	3	0	1	0	1	0
	DF	(Scotland) SCO	Joe Dingwall	32	1	29	1	1	0	1	0	1	0
	DF	(Scotland) SCO	Ryan Frances	18	0	15	0	1	0	1	0	1	0
	DF	(Scotland) SCO	Steven Jackson	38	1	33	1	3	0	1	0	1	0
	DF	(Scotland) SCO	Stuart Beveridge	12	1	11	1	1	0	0	0	0	0
	DF	(Scotland) SCO	Jamie Glasgow	2	0	2	0	0	0	0	0	0	0
	MF	(Scotland) SCO	Ally Love	20	3	16	2	2	0	1	0	1	1
	MF	(Scotland) SCO	Andy Stirling	40	7	35	5	3	2	1	0	1	0
	MF	(Scotland) SCO	Craig Scott	9	0	8	0	0	0	1	0	0	0
	MF	(Scotland) SCO	Michael Hunter	37	2	32	2	3	0	1	0	1	0
	MF	(Scotland) SCO	Ryan Wilkie	0	0	0	0	0	0	0	0	0	0
	MF	(Scotland) SCO	Dominico Gibson	11	2	8	1	3	1	0	0	0	0
	MF	(England) ENG	Scott Maxwell	31	4	28	4	3	0	0	0	0	0
	MF	(Scotland) SCO	Stuart Love	2	0	2	0	0	0	0	0	0	0
	MF	(Scotland) SCO	Scott Fulton	7	0	7	0	0	0	0	0	0	0
	MF	(England) ENG	Lewis Horner	26	2	25	2	1	0	0	0	0	0
	MF	(Scotland) SCO	Craig Winter	4	0	4	0	0	0	0	0	0	0
	MF	(Scotland) SCO	Jamie Benton	7	0	7	0	0	0	0	0	0	0
	MF	(Scotland) SCO	Rhys Devlin	12	1	12	1	0	0	0	0	0	0
	MF	(Scotland) SCO	Steven Tart	4	0	4	0	0	0	0	0	0	0
	MF	(Scotland) SCO	Jack Campbell	1	0	1	0	0	0	0	0	0	0
	FW	(Scotland) SCO	Kyle Gillespie	7	0	7	0	0	0	0	0	0	0
	FW	(Scotland) SCO	Alex Lurinsky	31	5	27	5	2	0	1	0	1	0
	FW	(Scotland) SCO	Fraser Team	22	1	18	0	2	1	1	0	1	0
	FW	(Scotland) SCO	Joe Savage	5	0	3	0	1	0	0	0	1	0
	FW	(Scotland) SCO	Jordyn Sheerin	21	1	19	1	0	0	1	0	1	0
	FW	(Scotland) SCO	Kevin Turner	37	7	32	6	3	0	1	0	1	1
	FW	(Scotland) SCO	Bradley Coyne	14	6	11	5	3	1	0	0	0	0
	FW	(Scotland) SCO	Graeme Ramage	10	1	10	1	0	0	0	0	0	0

=== Disciplinary record ===
Includes all competitive matches.

Last updated 5 May 2012

Nation	Position	Name	Third Division		Scottish Cup		League Cup		Challenge Cup		Total	
Nation	Position	Name	Booked	Sent off (straight red)	Booked	Sent off (straight red)	Booked	Sent off (straight red)	Booked	Sent off (straight red)	Booked	Sent off (straight red)
(Wales)	GK	Calum Antell	2	0	0	0	0	0	0	0	2	0
(Scotland)	GK	Gavin Sorley	0	0	0	0	0	0	0	0	0	0
(England)	DF	David Cane	2	0	0	1	0	0	0	0	2	1
(Scotland)	DF	Iain Chisholm	3	0	1	0	0	0	1	0	5	0
(Scotland)	DF	Joe Dingwall	5	0	0	0	0	0	0	0	5	0
(Scotland)	DF	Ryan Frances	7	2	0	1	1	0	1	0	8	3
(Scotland)	DF	Steven Jackson	9	1	0	0	0	0	0	0	9	1
(Scotland)	DF	Stuart Beveridge	4	0	1	0	0	0	0	0	5	0
(Scotland)	MF	Ally Love	3	1	2	0	0	0	0	0	5	1
(Scotland)	MF	Andy Stirling	2	1	1	0	0	0	0	0	3	1
(Scotland)	MF	Craig Scott	0	0	0	0	0	0	0	0	0	0
(Scotland)	MF	Michael Hunter	12	0	1	0	0	0	0	0	13	0
(Scotland)	MF	Ryan Wilkie	0	0	0	0	0	0	0	0	0	0
(Scotland)	MF	Nico Gibson	0	0	0	0	0	0	0	0	0	0
(England)	MF	Scott Maxwell	5	1	1	0	0	0	0	0	6	1
(Scotland)	MF	Stuart Love	0	0	0	0	0	0	0	0	0	0
(Scotland)	MF	Scott Fulton	0	0	0	0	0	0	0	0	0	0
(England)	MF	Lewis Horner	2	0	0	0	0	0	0	0	2	0
(Scotland)	MF	Craig Winter	2	0	0	0	0	0	0	0	2	0
(Scotland)	MF	Jamie Benton	1	0	0	0	0	0	0	0	1	0
(Scotland)	MF	Rhys Devlin	3	1	0	0	0	0	0	0	3	1
(Scotland)	MF	Steven Tart	1	0	0	0	0	0	0	0	1	0
(Scotland)	FW	Alex Lurinsky	2	0	0	0	0	0	0	0	2	0
(Scotland)	FW	Fraser Team	0	0	0	0	0	0	0	0	0	0
(Scotland)	FW	Joe Savage	0	0	1	0	0	0	0	0	1	0
(Scotland)	FW	Jordyn Sheerin	1	0	0	0	0	0	0	0	1	0
(Scotland)	FW	Kevin Turner	11	0	0	0	0	0	0	0	11	0
(Scotland)	FW	Bradley Coyne	2	0	0	0	0	0	0	0	2	0
(Scotland)	FW	Graeme Ramage	1	0	0	0	0	0	0	0	1	0

== League table ==
Pos	Team	Pld	W	D	L	GF	GA	GD	Pts
6	Annan Athletic	36	13	10	13	53	53	0	49
7	Berwick Rangers	36	12	12	12	61	58	+3	48
8	Montrose	36	11	5	20	58	75	−17	38
9	Clyde	36	8	11	17	35	50	−15	35
10	East Stirlingshire	36	6	6	24	38	88	−50	24

Source: SPFL Archive
Rules for classification: 1) points; 2) goal difference; 3) number of goals scored.

== Transfers ==
=== Players in ===
Player	From	Fee
(Scotland) Kevin Turner	(Scotland) St. Mungo’s	Free
(Scotland) Ryan Frances	(Scotland) St Mirren	Free
(Wales) Calum Antell	(Scotland) Hibernian	Loan
(Scotland) Iain Chisholm	(Scotland) Dumbarton	Free
(Scotland) Andrew Stirling	(Scotland) Stenhousemuir	Free
(Scotland) Ally Love	(Scotland) St Mirren	Free
(Scotland) Craig Gordon	(Scotland) Queen's Park	Free
(Scotland) Jordyn Sheerin	(Scotland) Arbroath	Free
(Scotland) David Cane	(Scotland) Airdrie United	Free
(Scotland) Alex Lurinsky	(Scotland) Bathgate Thistle	Free
(Scotland) Joe Dingwall	(Scotland) Edinburgh City	Free
(Scotland) Joe Savage	(Scotland) Camelon Juniors	Free
(Scotland) Dominico Gibson	(Scotland) Aberdeen	Free
(Scotland) Gary Pettigrew	(Scotland) Greenock Morton	Free
(Scotland) Scott Maxwell	(Scotland) Dalkeith Thistle	Free
(Scotland) Jamie Benton	(Scotland) Renfrew	Free
(Scotland) Scott Fulton	(Scotland) Renfrew	Free
(Scotland) Bradley Coyne	(Scotland) St Mirren	Loan
(Scotland) Stuart Love	(Scotland) Stenhousemuir	Loan
(Scotland) Michael Hunter	(Scotland) Stenhousemuir	Loan
(England) Lewis Horner	(Scotland) Hibernian	Loan
(Scotland) Craig Winter	(Scotland) Cowdenbeath	Loan
(Scotland) Rhys Devlin	(Scotland) Airdrie United	Loan
(Scotland) Graeme Ramage	(Scotland) Dumbarton	Loan

=== Players out ===
Player	To	Fee
(Scotland) Charlie Grant	Free Agent	Free
(Scotland) Paul Weaver	(Scotland) Ardrossan Winton Rovers	Free
(Scotland) Paul Hay	(Scotland) Clyde	Free
(Scotland) Derek Ure	(Scotland) Camelon Juniors	Free
(Scotland) Dean Richardson	(Scotland) Larkhall Thistle F.C.	Free
(Scotland) Kevin Cawley	(Scotland) Alloa Athletic	Free
(Scotland) Craig Tully	(Scotland) Clyde	Free
(Scotland) John Neil	(Scotland) Clyde	Free
(Scotland) Scott Johnston	(Scotland) Montrose	Free
(Scotland) David Dunn	(Scotland) Larkhall Thistle F.C.	Free
(Scotland) Matthew Porch	(Scotland) Penicuik Athletic	Free
(Scotland) Alex Walker	Free Agent	Free
(Scotland) Craig Donaldson	Free Agent	Free
(Scotland) Stephen Maguire	(Scotland) Thorniewood United	Free
(Scotland) Darren Kelly	(Scotland) Culter	Free
(Scotland) Steven Page	(Scotland) Dundonald Bluebell	Free
(Scotland) Gavin Sorley	(Scotland) Berwick Rangers	Free
(Scotland) Gary Pettigrew	(Scotland) Cumnock Juniors	Loan
(Scotland) Jamie Benton	(Scotland) Maryhill	Loan
(Scotland) Scott Fulton	(Scotland) Maryhill	Loan
(Scotland) Dominico Gibson	Free Agent	Free
(Scotland) Ally Love	(Scotland) Kirkintilloch Rob Roy	Free
(Scotland) Joe Savage		Retired
(Scotland) Daniel Tobin	Free Agent	Free
(Scotland) Stuart Beveridge	(Scotland) Bo'ness United	Loan
(Scotland) Craig Scott	(Scotland) Whitburn Junior	Loan
(Scotland) Stuart Beveridge	Free Agent	Released
(Scotland) Fraser Team	(Scotland) Ashfield	Loan
(Scotland) Iain Chisholm	Free Agent	Free
