= 2011–12 Clyde F.C. season =

Clyde
2011–12 season
- Manager: Jim Duffy
- Stadium: Broadwood Stadium
- Scottish Third Division: Ninth
- Challenge Cup: First Round
- League Cup: Second Round
- Scottish Cup: Second Round
- Top goalscorer: League: John Neill (7); All: John Neill (8)
- Highest home attendance: 757 vs. Montrose, 20 August 2011
- Lowest home attendance: 351 vs. Berwick Rangers, 15 February 2012

The 2011–12 season was Clyde's second consecutive season in the Scottish Third Division, having been relegated from the Scottish Second Division at the end of the 2009–10 season. Clyde also competed in the Challenge Cup, League Cup and the Scottish Cup.

== Summary ==
Berwick Rangers finished ninth in the Third Division. They reached the first round of the Challenge Cup, the second round of the League Cup and the second round of the Scottish Cup.

== Results & fixtures ==
Win Draw Loss Postponed

=== Third Division ===
6 August 2011 Scottish Third Division	Clyde	2–0	Peterhead	Broadwood Stadium
15:00	Sweeney 45'; McDonald 75'	Clyde Report		Attendance: 711; Referee: Robertson

13 August 2011 Scottish Third Division	Alloa Athletic	2–2	Clyde	Recreation Park
15:00	McCord 31'; Docherty 61'; Bain (red card)	Clyde Report	Sweeney 21', 80' (pen.)	Attendance: 705

20 August 2011 Scottish Third Division	Clyde	1–0	Montrose	Broadwood Stadium
15:00	McDonald 50'	Clyde Report		Attendance: 757; Referee: Clancy

27 August 2011 Scottish Third Division	Annan Athletic	1–0	Clyde	Galabank
15:00	Sloan 29'	BBC Report		Attendance: 644; Referee: Graham

10 September 2011 Scottish Third Division	Clyde	0–2	Queen's Park	Broadwood Stadium
15:00		BBC Report	Longworth 82'; Daly 86'	Attendance: 650; Referee: Cook

17 September 2011 Scottish Third Division	Elgin City	0–3	Clyde	Borough Briggs
15:00		SFL Report	Cusak 12', 26'; Neil 68'	Attendance: 728; Referee: Anderson

24 September 2011 Scottish Third Division	Clyde	1–4	Berwick Rangers	Broadwood Stadium
	Neill 48'	BBC Report	Gray 41'; Gribben 54', 56'; Smith 90'	Attendance: 618; Referee: Somers

1 October 2011 Scottish Third Division	Stranraer	0–0	Clyde	Stair Park
15:00		BBC Report		Attendance: 363; Referee: Beaton

15 October 2011 Scottish Third Division	Clyde	7–1	East Stirlingshire	Broadwood Stadium
	McDonald 14'; Brown 19'; Neil 31'; Gallagher 77'; Oliver 81'; Cusack 82'; Archdeacon 90'	SFL Report	Coyne 82'	Attendance: 617; Referee: Robertson

29 October 2011 Scottish Third Division	Clyde	P – P	Alloa Athletic	Broadwood Stadium

5 November 2011 Scottish Third Division	Peterhead	0–0	Clyde	Balmoor Stadium
15:00		SFL Report	Hay (yellow card) 83' (red card)	Attendance: 517; Referee: Dallas

8 November 2011 Scottish Third Division	Clyde	0–1	Alloa Athletic	Broadwood Stadium
19:45		SFL Report	Forrest (yellow card) 32' (red card); Holmes 2'	Attendance: 654; Referee: Anderson

12 November 2011 Scottish Third Division	Clyde	0–0	Annan Athletic	Broadwood Stadium
15:00	McDonald (yellow card) 69' (red card)	SFL Report	Watson (yellow card) 78' (red card)	Attendance: 668; Referee: Aitken

26 November 2011 Scottish Third Division	Queen's Park	P – P	Clyde	Hampden Park
15:00

3 December 2011 Scottish Third Division	Berwick Rangers	0–2	Clyde	Shielfield Park
15:00		SFL Report; Clyde Report	Sweeney 25' (pen.); Cusack 86'	Attendance: 410; Referee: Somers

10 December 2011 Scottish Third Division	Clyde	P – P	Elgin City	Broadwood Stadium
15:00

13 December 2011 Scottish Third Division	Queen's Park	3–0	Clyde	Hampden Park
19:30	Burns 4'; Smith 63'; Daly 84'	SFL Report		Attendance: 402; Referee: Charleston

17 December 2011 Scottish Third Division	East Stirlingshire	1–1	Clyde	Ochilview Park
15:00	Turner 45'	BBC Report	Cusack 92'	Attendance: 490; Referee: Cook

26 December 2011 Scottish Third Division	Clyde	1–1	Stranraer	Broadwood Stadium
15:00	McDonald 28'	SFL Report	Grehan 18'	Attendance: 556; Referee: Anderson

2 January 2012 Scottish Third Division	Clyde	1–2	Queen's Park	Broadwood Stadium
15:00	Sweeney (red card) 45'; White 45'	SFL Report	Longworth 6'; Daly 78'	Attendance: 668; Referee: Salmond

7 January 2012 Scottish Third Division	Annan Athletic	1–0	Clyde	Galabank
15:00	O'Connor 64'	Report		Attendance: 505; Referee: Robertson

14 January 2012 Scottish Third Division	Montrose	4–0	Clyde	Links Park
15:00	McGowan 51'; Johnston 53'; Winter 75'; McNally 90'	SFL Report		Attendance: 365; Referee: Graham

21 January 2012 Scottish Third Division	Clyde	0–1	Peterhead	Broadwood Stadium
15:00		SFL Report	Bavidge 3'	Attendance: 456; Referee: Colvin

28 January 2012 Scottish Third Division	Clyde	P – P	Berwick Rangers	Broadwood Stadium
15:00

4 February 2012 Scottish Third Division	Elgin City	P – P	Clyde	Borough Briggs
15:00

11 February 2012 Scottish Third Division	Clyde	3–0	East Stirlingshire	Broadwood Stadium
15:00	Sweeney 19' (Penalty); Sloss 46'; Neill 66'	SFL Report		Attendance: 507; Referee: Graham

15 February 2012 Scottish Third Division	Clyde	2–2	Berwick Rangers	Broadwood Stadium
19:45	Brown 6'; Neill 13'; Gray (red card) 45'	SFL Report	Walker 29'; Gray 90'	Attendance: 351; Referee: Aitken

18 February 2012 Scottish Third Division	Stranraer	1–0	Clyde	Stair Park
15:00	Stirling 54'	SFL Report		Attendance: 385; Referee: Hilland

21 February 2012 Scottish Third Division	Clyde	1–2	Elgin City	Broadwood Stadium
19:45	Niven 23' (Own Goal)	SFL Report	Moore 53'; Durnan 55'	Referee: Beaton

25 February 2012 Scottish Third Division	Alloa Athletic	1–0	Clyde	Recreation Park
15:00	Young 76'	SFL Report		Attendance: 719; Referee: Anderson

28 February 2012 Scottish Third Division	Elgin City	1–1	Clyde	Borough Briggs
19:45	Wilson 89'	SFL Report	Pollock 37'	Attendance: 611; Referee: McLean

3 March 2012 Scottish Third Division	Clyde	1–2	Montrose	Broadwood Stadium
15:00	Crighton 54' (Own Goal)	SFL Report	Cameron 50'; Boyle 64'	Attendance: 476; Referee: Dallas

17 March 2012 Scottish Third Division	Clyde	1–1	Annan Athletic	Broadwood Stadium
15:00	Pollock 26'	SFL Report	Winters 70'; Cox (red card) 75'	Attendance: 503; Referee: McDermott

20 March 2012 Scottish Third Division	Queen's Park	3–0	Clyde	Hampden Park
19:30	Longworth 7'; Watt 10'; McBride 89'	SFL Report		Attendance: 658; Referee: Aitken

24 March 2012 Scottish Third Division	Clyde	0–2	Elgin City	Broadwood Stadium
15:00		SFL Report	Crooks 57'; Cameron 78'	Attendance: 450; Referee: Charleston

31 March 2012 Scottish Third Division	Berwick Rangers	3–0	Clyde	Shielfield Park
15:00	Handling 31', 35'; Currie 88'	SFL Report		Attendance: 389; Referee: Roache

7 April 2012 Scottish Third Division	Clyde	2–1	Stranraer	Broadwood Stadium
15:00	Brannan 55'; Belkouche 63' (Own goal)	SFL Report	Moore 6'	Attendance: 506; Referee: Graham

14 April 2012 Scottish Third Division	East Stirlingshire	0–1	Clyde	Ochilview Park
15:00		SFL Report	Neil 76'	Attendance: 434; Referee: Northcroft

21 April 2012 Scottish Third Division	Peterhead	1–1	Clyde	Balmoor Stadium
15:00	Gray 48'	SFL Report	Gallagher 90'	Attendance: 497; Referee: Cook

28 April 2012 Scottish Third Division	Clyde	1–1	Alloa Athletic	Broadwood Stadium
15:00	Scullion 65'	SFL Report	May 6'	Attendance: 748; Referee: Steven

5 May 2012 Scottish Third Division	Montrose	5–0	Clyde	Links Park
15:00	Boyle 20', 41', 75'; Masson 54'; Cambell 72'	SFL Report		Attendance: 450; Referee: Robertson

=== Challenge Cup ===
23 July 2011 Challenge Cup Rd 1	Clyde	2–2 (3–4 p)	Berwick Rangers	Broadwood Stadium
	Fitzpatrick 36'; McDonald 51'	BBC Report	Currie 4'; Gray 10'	Attendance: 472; Referee: Stevie O'Reilly

=== League Cup ===
30 July 2011 Scottish League Cup Rd 1	Brechin City	2–4 (a.e.t.)	Clyde	Glebe Park
	McKenna 26'; Buist (red card) 97'; King 114'	BBC Report	McLauchlan 20' (o.g.); Sweeney 97' (pen.); Archdeacon 105'; Gray 119'	Attendance: 403; Referee: Northcroft

24 August 2011 Scottish League Cup Rd 2	Clyde	0–4	Motherwell	Broadwood Stadium
		BBC Report	Higdon 17'; Law 41'; Hateley 51'; Lawless 85'	Attendance: 1,778; Referee: Charlie Richmond

=== Scottish Cup ===
22 October 2011 Scottish Cup round 2	Montrose	2–1	Clyde	Links Park
15:00	Lunan 23'; Pierce 49'	Clyde Report	Neil 19'	Attendance: 452; Referee: Robertson

== Player statistics ==
=== Squad ===
Last updated 5 May 2012

No.	Pos	Nat	Player	Total		Third Division		Scottish Cup		League Cup		Challenge Cup	
No.	Pos	Nat	Player	Apps	Goals	Apps	Goals	Apps	Goals	Apps	Goals	Apps	Goals
	GK	(Scotland) SCO	John Charles Hutchison	3	0	0	0	1	0	2	0	0	0
	GK	(Slovakia) SVK	Filip Mentel	12	0	11	0	0	0	0	0	1	0
	GK	(Scotland) SCO	Alan Combe	1	0	1	0	0	0	0	0	0	0
	GK	(Canada) CAN	Lucas Birnstingl	0	0	0	0	0	0	0	0	0	0
	GK	(Scotland) SCO	David Crawford	12	0	12	0	0	0	0	0	0	0
	GK	(Australia) AUS	Nick Feely	12	0	12	0	0	0	0	0	0	0
	DF	(Scotland) SCO	Gavin Brown	27	1	24	1	0	0	2	0	1	0
	DF	(Scotland) SCO	Iain Gray	36	1	32	0	1	0	2	1	1	0
	DF	(Scotland) SCO	Declan Gallagher	27	2	25	2	1	0	1	0	0	0
	DF	(Scotland) SCO	Kris Irvine	12	0	9	0	1	0	1	0	1	0
	DF	(Scotland) SCO	Brian McQueen	32	0	29	0	1	0	2	0	0	0
	DF	(Scotland) SCO	Drew Ramsay	5	0	5	0	0	0	0	0	0	0
	DF	(Scotland) SCO	Lee Sharp	39	0	35	0	1	0	2	0	1	0
	DF	(Scotland) SCO	Craig Tully	2	0	0	0	0	0	1	0	1	0
	DF	(Scotland) SCO	Jason Marr	17	0	17	0	0	0	0	0	0	0
	MF	(Scotland) SCO	Keiran Daw	2	0	2	0	0	0	0	0	0	0
	MF	(Scotland) SCO	Daniel Fitzpatrick	5	1	4	0	0	0	0	0	1	1
	MF	(Scotland) SCO	Paul Hay	33	0	29	0	1	0	2	0	1	0
	MF	(Scotland) SCO	Aaron Kane	1	0	1	0	0	0	0	0	0	0
	MF	(Scotland) SCO	Ryan Kane	25	0	24	0	0	0	1	0	0	0
	MF	(Scotland) SCO	Paul McMullan	5	0	4	0	1	0	0	0	0	0
	MF	(Scotland) SCO	John Neill	37	8	33	7	1	1	2	0	1	0
	MF	(Scotland) SCO	Pat Scullion	23	1	21	1	0	0	1	0	1	0
	MF	(Scotland) SCO	Jack Sloss	9	1	9	1	0	0	0	0	0	0
	MF	(Scotland) SCO	John Sweeney	37	6	33	5	1	0	2	1	1	0
	MF	(Scotland) SCO	Dale Fulton	2	0	2	0	0	0	0	0	0	0
	MF	(Scotland) SCO	Jamie Pollock	9	2	9	2	0	0	0	0	0	0
	FW	(Scotland) SCO	Kevin Finlayson	1	0	1	0	0	0	0	0	0	0
	FW	(Scotland) SCO	Mark Archdeacon	15	2	12	1	1	0	2	1	0	0
	FW	(Scotland) SCO	Liam Cusack	21	5	17	5	1	0	2	0	1	0
	FW	(Scotland) SCO	Michael Oliver	32	1	29	1	1	0	1	0	1	0
	FW	(Scotland) SCO	Stephen McDonald	32	4	28	3	1	0	2	0	1	1
	FW	(Scotland) SCO	Jordan White	6	1	6	1	0	0	0	0	0	0
	FW	(Scotland) SCO	Kieran Brannan	9	1	9	1	0	0	0	0	0	0
	FW	(Scotland) SCO	Grant Dickie	2	0	2	0	0	0	0	0	0	0

== League table ==
Pos	Team	Pld	W	D	L	GF	GA	GD	Pts
6	Annan Athletic	36	13	10	13	53	53	0	49
7	Berwick Rangers	36	12	12	12	61	58	+3	48
8	Montrose	36	11	5	20	58	75	−17	38
9	Clyde	36	8	11	17	35	50	−15	35
10	East Stirlingshire	36	6	6	24	38	88	−50	24

Source: SPFL Archive
Rules for classification: 1) points; 2) goal difference; 3) number of goals scored.

== Transfers ==
=== Players in ===
Player	From	Fee
(Scotland) Alan Combe	(Scotland) Kilmarnock	Free
(Scotland) Declan Gallagher	(Scotland) Celtic	Free
(Scotland) Craig Tully	(Scotland) East Stirlingshire	Free
(Scotland) Michael Oliver	(Scotland) Campsie Black Watch	Free
(Scotland) Steph McDonald	(Scotland) Shettleston Juniors	Free
(Scotland) Brian McQueen	(Scotland) Hamilton	Free
(Scotland) Kris Irvine	(Scotland) Dundee United	Free
(Scotland) Liam Cusack	(Scotland) Dumbarton	Free
(Scotland) Ryan Kane	(Scotland) Greenock Morton	Free
(Scotland) John Neil	(Scotland) East Stirlingshire	Free
(Scotland) Pat Scullion	(Scotland) Stenhousemuir	Free
(Scotland) Lee Sharp	(Scotland) Stranraer	Free
(Slovakia) Filip Mentel	(Scotland) Dundee United	Loan
(Scotland) Mark Archdeacon	(Scotland) Brechin City	Free
(Scotland) Paul Hay	(Scotland) East Stirlingshire	Free
(Scotland) Jason Marr	(Scotland) Celtic	Free
(Scotland) Jordan White	(Republic of Ireland) Drogheda United	Free
(Canada) Lucas Birnstingl		Free
(Scotland) David Crawford	(Scotland) Ayr United	Free
(Scotland) Dale Fulton	(Scotland) Falkirk	Loan
(Scotland) Kieran Brannan	(Scotland) Dumbarton	Loan
(Scotland) Jamie Pollock	(Scotland) Motherwell	Loan
(Australia) Nick Feely	(Scotland) Celtic	Loan

=== Players out ===
Player	To	Fee
(Scotland) Marc McCusker	(Scotland) Queen of the South	Free
(Scotland) Ross MacMillan	(Scotland) Stenhousemuir	Free
(Scotland) John Stewart	(Scotland) Bo'ness United	Free
(Scotland) Willie Sawyers	(Scotland) Renfrew	Free
(Scotland) Alan Lithgow	(Scotland) Dumbarton	Free
(Scotland) Jordan Allan	(Scotland) Bo'ness United	Free
(Scotland) Graham Girvan	(Scotland) Arbroath	Free
(Scotland) Ally Park	(Scotland) Auchinleck Talbot	Free
(Scotland) Neil McGowan	(Scotland) Irvine Meadow XI	Free
(Scotland) Ricky Waddell	(United States) Los Angeles Blues	Free
(Scotland) Hadyn Cochrane	Free agent	Free
(Scotland) Connor Stevenson	(Scotland) Vale of Clyde	Free
(Scotland) Stuart Mills	Free agent	Free
(Scotland) Charlie Millar	Free agent	Free
(Latvia) Aleksandrs Gramovics	(Latvia) FK Spartaks Jūrmala	Free
(Scotland) Kevin Finlayson	(Scotland) Kirkintilloch Rob Roy	Free
(Scotland) Craig Tully		Retired
(Scotland) John Charles Hutchison	(Scotland) Pollok	Free
(Scotland) Paul McMullan	(Scotland) Elgin City	Free
(Scotland) Jordan White	(Scotland) Falkirk	Free
(Scotland) Liam Cusack	(Scotland) Cowdenbeath	Undisclosed
