= 2010–11 Berwick Rangers F.C. season =

Berwick Rangers
2010–11 season
- Manager: Jimmy Crease
- Stadium: Shielfield Park
- Scottish Third Division: Sixth place
- Challenge Cup: Second round, lost to Partick Thistle
- League Cup: First round, lost to Peterhead
- Scottish Cup: Fourth round, lost to Celtic
- Top goalscorer: League: Gribben (17); All: Gribben (17)
- Highest home attendance: 520 vs. Queen's Park, 30 October 2010
- Lowest home attendance: 258 vs. Albion Rovers, 15 March 2011
- Average home league attendance: 378

The 2010–11 season was Berwick Rangers's sixth consecutive season in the Scottish Third Division, having been relegated from the Scottish Second Division at the end of the 2004–05 season. Berwick also competed in the Challenge Cup, League Cup and the Scottish Cup.

== Summary ==
Berwick finished sixth in the Third Division. They reached the second of the Challenge Cup, the first round of the League Cup and the fourth round of the Scottish Cup, losing to eventual winners Celtic.

== Results & fixtures ==
Win Draw Loss

=== Scottish Third Division ===
7 August 2010 Scottish Third Division	Albion Rovers	2–2	Berwick Rangers	Cliftonhill
	McLeod 29'; Smith 79'	BBC Report	Gordon 32'; Currie 85'	Attendance: 369; Referee: Allan

14 August 2010 Scottish Third Division	Berwick Rangers	6–2	Elgin City	Shielfield Park
	McLeod 4'; Gribben 11', 34', 50'; O'Reilly 39'; Currie 52'	BBC Report	Gunn 57'; MacLeod 80'	Attendance: 409; Referee: Robertson

21 August 2010 Scottish Third Division	Clyde	1–4	Berwick Rangers	Broadwood Stadium
	McCusker 59'	BBC Report	Notman 8'; Currie 64', 84'; O'Reilly 70'	Attendance: 772; Referee: Roache

28 August 2010 Scottish Third Division	Queen's Park	0–2	Berwick Rangers	Hampden Park
		SFL Report	Gribben 29' (Penalty); O'Reilly 52'	Attendance: 479; Referee: Watters

11 September 2010 Scottish Third Division	Berwick Rangers	4–1	Arbroath	Shielfield Park
	O'Reilly 21'; Gribben 24', 28', 51'	SFL Report	McAnespie 91'	Attendance: 441; Referee: Roache

18 September 2010 Scottish Third Division	Berwick Rangers	2–2	Stranraer	Shielfield Park
	Gribben 28'; Brazil 88'; Notman (red card) 54'	BBC Report	Agnew 56' (Penalty); Winter 65'	Attendance: 489; Referee: Robertson

25 September 2010 Scottish Third Division	East Stirlingshire	0–0	Berwick Rangers	Ochilview Park
15:00	Dunn (red card) 45'	BBC Report	Peat (red card) 71'	Attendance: 383; Referee: O'Reilly

2 October 2010 Scottish Third Division	Berwick Rangers	2–2	Annan Athletic	Shielfield Park
	Gribben 1', 30'; Greenhill (yellow card) 57' (red card)	BBC Report	Sloan 25'; Steele 92'	Attendance: 448; Referee: Smith

16 October 2010 Scottish Third Division	Montrose	1–1	Berwick Rangers	Links Park
	Tosh 80' (Penalty)	BBC Report	Gribben 25'	Attendance: 376; Referee: Robertson

30 October 2010 Scottish Third Division	Berwick Rangers	1–1	Queen's Park	Shielfield Park
	Gribben 76'	BBC Report	McBride 68'	Attendance: 520; Referee: Hilland

6 November 2010 Scottish Third Division	Arbroath	3–2	Berwick Rangers	Gayfield Park
	Durnan 27'; Doris 31'; Swankie 82'	BBC Report	Brazil 19'; McLeod 52'	Attendance: 402; Referee: Charleston

13 November 2010 Scottish Third Division	Berwick Rangers	2–1	Clyde	Shielfield Park
	Little 79'; Currie 81' (Penalty)	BBC Report	Lithgow 63'	Attendance: 432; Referee: Clancy

11 December 2010 Scottish Third Division	Stranraer	1–1	Berwick Rangers	Stair Park
	Malcolm 86'	BBC Report	Brazil 2'	Attendance: 267; Referee: Madden

15 January 2011 Scottish Third Division	Berwick Rangers	0–4	Arbroath	Shielfield Park
		BBC Report	Swankie 68', 70'; Chisholm 78'; Gibson 88'	Attendance: 369; Referee: McKendrick

22 January 2011 Scottish Third Division	Queen's Park	1–0	Berwick Rangers	Hampden Park
	McBride 72'	BBC Report		Attendance: 485; Referee: Colvin

29 January 2011 Scottish Third Division	East Stirlingshire	1–0	Berwick Rangers	Ochilview Park
15:00	McLeod 31' (o.g.)	BBC Report		Attendance: 341; Referee: Beaton

12 February 2011 Scottish Third Division	Berwick Rangers	2–3	Annan Athletic	Shielfield Park
	Gray 25'; Little 43'	BBC Report	Harty 27', 78' (Penalty); Muirhead 57'	Attendance: 311; Referee: Clancy

15 February 2011 Scottish Third Division	Clyde	2–0	Berwick Rangers	Broadwood Stadium
	Stewart 13'; Finlayson 88'	BBC Report	Brazil (red card) 89'	Attendance: 385; Referee: Robertson

19 February 2011 Scottish Third Division	Montrose	1–1	Berwick Rangers	Links Park
	Tosh 62' (Penalty)	BBC Report	O'Reilly 69'	Attendance: 301; Referee: Smith

22 February 2011 Scottish Third Division	Berwick Rangers	1–0	Montrose	Shielfield Park
	Currie 89'	SFL Report		Attendance: 285; Referee: Hilland

26 February 2011 Scottish Third Division	Albion Rovers	0–1	Berwick Rangers	Cliftonhill
		BBC Report	O'Reilly 20'	Attendance: 373; Referee: Aitken

1 March 2011 Scottish Third Division	Annan Athletic	1–1	Berwick Rangers	Galabank
	Neilson 35'	BBC Report	Gribben 74'	Attendance: 309; Referee: Beaton

5 March 2011 Scottish Third Division	Berwick Rangers	4–0	Elgin City	Shielfield Park
	Gray 25', 35', 76'; Gribben 33'	BBC Report		Attendance: 305; Referee: McKendrick

8 March 2011 Scottish Third Division	Berwick Rangers	3–0	East Stirlingshire	Shielfield Park
19:45	Gribben 12', 79'; McLean 45'	BBC Report		Attendance: 266; Referee: Madden

12 March 2011 Scottish Third Division	Arbroath	2–1	Berwick Rangers	Gayfield Park
	Gibson 22'; Doris 52'	BBC Report	Hill 92' (Own goal)	Attendance: 491; Referee: Anderson

15 March 2011 Scottish Third Division	Berwick Rangers	1–6	Albion Rovers	Shielfield Park
	Gray 8'	BBC Report	Gemmell 30'; Lumsden 42'; Chaplain 45+1', 50', 85'; Hamilton 71'	Attendance: 258; Referee: Salmond

19 March 2011 Scottish Third Division	Berwick Rangers	3–1	Queen's Park	Shielfield Park
	Currie 37' (Penalty); Greenhill 45+2', 74'	BBC Report	Quinn 66'	Attendance: 398; Referee: Robertson

22 March 2011 Scottish Third Division	Elgin City	1–2	Berwick Rangers	Borough Briggs
	Gunn 71'	SFL Report	L Currie 53'; P Currie 83'	Attendance: 412; Referee: McDermott

26 March 2011 Scottish Third Division	Berwick Rangers	1–1	East Stirlingshire	Shielfield Park
15:00	Brazil 90'	BBC Report	Neill 5'	Attendance: 367; Referee: Allan

29 March 2011 Scottish Third Division	Berwick Rangers	3–3	Stranraer	Shielfield Park
	McLeod 9'; Gribben 40'; Gray 77'	BBC Report	Murphy 4'; Agnew 45+2', 90'	Attendance: 297; Referee: Charleston

2 April 2011 Scottish Third Division	Stranraer	3–1	Berwick Rangers	Stair Park
	McColm 40', 67'; Gallacher 52'	BBC Report	Currie 56'	Attendance: 331; Referee: Clancy

9 April 2011 Scottish Third Division	Berwick Rangers	0–1	Montrose	Shielfield Park
		BBC Report	Masson 80'	Attendance: 353; Referee: Robertson

16 April 2011 Scottish Third Division	Annan Athletic	2–3	Berwick Rangers	Galabank
	Gilfillan 64'; O'Connor 80'	BBC Report	Gray 17', 44'; Currie 53'	Attendance: 515; Referee: O'Reilly

23 April 2011 Scottish Third Division	Berwick Rangers	1–1	Clyde	Shielfield Park
	Currie 59'	BBC Report	Stewart 62' (Penalty)	Attendance: 427; Referee: Roache

30 April 2011 Scottish Third Division	Elgin City	3–2	Berwick Rangers	Borough Briggs
	Crooks 37' (Penalty); MacDonald 56'; Kaczan 79'	BBC Report	Currie 13', 20'	Attendance: 496; Referee: Beaton

7 May 2011 Scottish Third Division	Berwick Rangers	2–2	Albion Rovers	Shielfield Park
	Brazil 42'; Ponton 49'	BBC Report	Love 5'; Gilmartin 88'	Attendance: 436; Referee: Hilland

=== Scottish Challenge Cup ===
10 August 2010 Scottish Challenge Cup round 2 (Note: Berwick Rangers received a random bye to the second round.)	Partick Thistle	2–1	Berwick Rangers	Firhill Stadium
	Cairney 40'; Rowson 80'	BBC Report	McLean 28'	Attendance: 931; Referee: Law

=== Scottish League Cup ===
31 July 2010 Scottish League Cup round 1	Peterhead	1–0	Berwick Rangers	Balmoor
	Wyness 82'	BBC Report		Attendance: 399; Referee: Watters

=== Scottish Cup ===
23 October 2010 Scottish Cup round 2	Clyde	1–2	Berwick Rangers	Broadwood Stadium
	Finlayson 76'	Clyde Report	Currie 63'; McMullan 71'	Attendance: 534; Referee: Colvin

20 November 2010 Scottish Cup round 3	Cove Rangers	0–3	Berwick Rangers	Allan Park
		BBC Report	Brazil 26'; Greenhill 30'; McMullan 67'	Attendance: 250; Referee: Nicholls

9 January 2011 Scottish Cup round 4	Berwick Rangers	0–2	Celtic	Shielfield Park
		BBC Report	Majstorović 17'; Brown 82'	Attendance: 3,877; Referee: Murray

== Player statistics ==
=== Squad ===
No.	Pos	Nat	Player	Total		Third Division		Challenge Cup		League Cup		Scottish Cup	
No.	Pos	Nat	Player	Apps	Goals	Apps	Goals	Apps	Goals	Apps	Goals	Apps	Goals
	GK	(Scotland) SCO	Ian McCaldon	18	0	15+1	0	1+0	0	1+0	0	0+0	0
	GK	(Scotland) SCO	Gary O'Connor	1	0	0+1	0	0+0	0	0+0	0	0+0	0
	GK	(Scotland) SCO	Mark Peat	24	0	21+0	0	0+0	0	0+0	0	3+0	0
	DF	(Scotland) SCO	Lee Currie	16	1	16+0	1	0+0	0	0+0	0	0+0	0
	DF	(Scotland) SCO	Jamie Ewart	25	0	19+6	0	0+0	0	0+0	0	0+0	0
	DF	(Scotland) SCO	Guy Kerr	2	0	0+1	0	0+0	0	0+0	0	0+1	0
	DF	(Scotland) SCO	Chris McLeod	32	3	26+1	3	1+0	0	1+0	0	3+0	0
	DF	(Scotland) SCO	Andrew McLean	41	2	36+0	1	1+0	1	1+0	0	3+0	0
	DF	(Scotland) SCO	Elliott Smith	23	0	16+2	0	1+0	0	1+0	0	3+0	0
	DF	(Scotland) SCO	Stephen Thomson	7	0	5+0	0	0+0	0	0+0	0	2+0	0
	MF	(Scotland) SCO	Stuart Callaghan	20	0	20+0	0	0+0	0	0+0	0	0+0	0
	MF	(Scotland) SCO	Paul Currie	35	14	29+1	13	1+0	0	1+0	0	3+0	1
	MF	(Scotland) SCO	John Grant	18	0	16+2	0	0+0	0	0+0	0	0+0	0
	MF	(Scotland) SCO	David Greenhill	35	3	26+4	2	1+0	0	1+0	0	3+0	1
	MF	(Scotland) SCO	Ryan Holms	3	0	0+1	0	0+1	0	0+1	0	0+0	0
	MF	(Scotland) SCO	Eddie Malone	1	0	1+0	0	0+0	0	0+0	0	0+0	0
	MF	(Scotland) SCO	Fraser McLaren	20	0	11+5	0	1+0	0	1+0	0	2+0	0
	MF	(Scotland) SCO	Paul McMullan	18	2	12+1	0	1+0	0	1+0	0	2+1	2
	MF	(Scotland) SCO	Kevin Motion	1	0	0+1	0	0+0	0	0+0	0	0+0	0
	MF	(Scotland) SCO	Steven Notman	33	1	29+0	1	0+0	0	1+0	0	3+0	0
	MF	(Scotland) SCO	Aaron Ponton	8	1	2+6	1	0+0	0	0+0	0	0+0	0
	MF	(Scotland) SCO	Stuart Roseburgh	1	0	1+0	0	0+0	0	0+0	0	0+0	0
	FW	(Scotland) SCO	Alan Brazil	38	6	15+18	5	1+0	0	0+1	0	1+2	1
	FW	(England) ENG	Damon Gray	17	8	11+6	8	0+0	0	0+0	0	0+0	0
	FW	(Scotland) SCO	Darren Gribben	35	17	28+3	17	1+0	0	0+1	0	2+0	0
	FW	(Scotland) SCO	Kevin Gordon	33	1	16+14	1	1+0	0	1+0	0	1+0	0
	FW	(Scotland) SCO	Ian Little	21	2	10+9	2	0+0	0	0+0	0	1+1	0
	FW	(England) ENG	Kristian Neill	2	0	0+2	0	0+0	0	0+0	0	0+0	0
	FW	(Scotland) SCO	Craig O'Reilly	24	6	15+6	6	0+1	0	1+0	0	1+0	0

== League table ==
Pos	Team	Pld	W	D	L	GF	GA	GD	Pts	Promotion or qualification
4	Annan Athletic	36	16	11	9	58	45	+13	59	Qualification for the Second Division Play-offs
5	Stranraer	36	15	12	9	72	57	+15	57	
6	Berwick Rangers	36	12	13	11	62	56	+6	49	
7	Elgin City	36	13	6	17	53	63	−10	45	
8	Montrose	36	10	7	19	47	61	−14	37	

Source: SPFL
Rules for classification: 1) points; 2) goal difference; 3) number of goals scored.
