= 2010–11 East Stirlingshire F.C. season =

East Stirlingshire
2010–11 season
- Chairman: Les Thomson
- Head coach: Jim McInally
- Stadium: Ochilview Park^{[note 1]}
- Third Division: 9th
- Scottish Cup: Fourth round (expelled)^{[note 2]}
- League Cup: First round (lost to Alloa Athletic)
- Challenge Cup: Second round (lost to Peterhead)
- Top goalscorer: League: Kevin Cawley (8); All: Kevin Cawley (14)
- Highest home attendance: 630 v. Buckie Thistle (18 January 2011, Scottish Cup)
- Lowest home attendance: 178 v. Annan Athletic (15 March 2011)
- Average home league attendance: 409
Home colours

The 2010–11 season was East Stirlingshire Football Club's seventeenth consecutive season in the Scottish Football League Third Division since being relegated from the Second Division at the end of the 1993–94 season, following league reconstruction. The club also competed in the Scottish Cup, League Cup and Challenge Cup.

== Team kit ==
A change from the previous two seasons, the club reverted to its traditional black and white hoops. A change from all black shirts from. New kit manufacturers were also introduced as Prostar with Foxlane as the shirt sponsor.

== Fixtures and results ==
Win Draw Loss Postponed

=== Scottish Third Division ===
7 August 2010 Third Division	Annan Athletic	3 – 1	East Stirlingshire	Galabank, Annan
15:00	Jack 16'; Halsman 18'; Sloan 20'	Report	Summersgill 38' (o.g.)	Attendance: 539; Referee: Des Roache

14 August 2010 Third Division	East Stirlingshire	2 – 1	Montrose	Ochilview Park, Stenhousemuir
15:00	Maguire 76' (pen.); Stevenson 88'	Report	Tosh 25'; Nicoll (red card) 90'	Attendance: 332; Referee: Brian Colvin

21 August 2010 Third Division	Elgin City	0 – 2	East Stirlingshire	Borough Briggs, Elgin
15:00		Report	Dunn 78' (pen.); Stevenson 89'; Weaver (red card) 90'	Attendance: 602; Referee: Matt Northcroft

28 August 2010 Third Division	Arbroath	2 – 0	East Stirlingshire	Gayfield Park, Arbroath
15:00		Report	Swankie 27'; McGowan 81'	Attendance: 499; Referee: John Beaton

11 September 2010 Third Division	East Stirlingshire	0 – 0	Clyde	Ochilview Park, Stenhousemuir
15:00		Report		Attendance: 532; Referee: David Somers

18 September 2010 Third Division	Queen's Park	2 – 0	East Stirlingshire	Hampden Park, Glasgow
15:00	Longworth 18'; Smith 26'	Report		Attendance: 460; Referee: Gary Hilland

25 September 2010 Third Division	East Stirlingshire	0 – 0	Berwick Rangers	Ochilview Park, Stenhousemuir
15:00	Dunn (red card) 45'	Report	Peat (red card) 71'	Attendance: 383; Referee: Stevie O'Reilly

2 October 2010 Third Division	Albion Rovers	1 – 0	East Stirlingshire	Cliftonhill, Coatbridge
15:00	McGowan 28'	Report	Donaldson (red card) 56'	Attendance: 367; Referee: John Beaton

9 October 2010 Third Division	Elgin City	2 – 0	East Stirlingshire	Borough Briggs, Elgin
15:00	Gunn 2'; Wilson 90' (pen.)	Report		Attendance: 475; Referee: Kevin Clancy

16 October 2010 Third Division	East Stirlingshire	0 – 1	Stranraer	Ochilview Park, Stenhousemuir
15:00		Report	Oné 1'	Attendance: 317; Referee: Neil Watters

30 October 2010 Third Division	East Stirlingshire	P – P	Arbroath	Ochilview Park, Stenhousemuir
15:00

6 November 2010 Third Division	Clyde	1 – 2	East Stirlingshire	Broadwood Stadium, Cumbernauld
15:00	Mills 21'; Stewart (red card) 90'	Report	Dunn 9'; Cawley 36'	Attendance: 652; Referee: John Beaton

10 November 2010 Third Division	East Stirlingshire	1 – 3	Arbroath	Ochilview Park, Stenhousemuir
19:45	Cawley 5'	Report	Gibson 15'; Falkingham 42'; McGowan 82'	Attendance: 238; Referee: T Robertson

13 November 2010 Third Division	East Stirlingshire	0 – 2	Elgin City	Ochilview Park, Stenhousemuir
15:00		Report	Inglis 34'; Frizzel 81'	Attendance: 243; Referee: Anthony Law

27 November 2010 Third Division	Montrose	P – P	East Stirlingshire	Links Park, Montrose
15:00		Report

11 December 2010 Third Division	East Stirlingshire	P – P	Queen's Park	Ochilview Park, Stenhousemuir
15:00		Report

14 December 2010 Third Division	Berwick Rangers	P – P	East Stirlingshire	Shielfield Park, Berwick-upon-Tweed
19:45		Report

18 December 2010 Third Division	Stranraer	P – P	East Stirlingshire	Stair Park, Stranraer
15:00		Report

26 December 2010 Third Division	East Stirlingshire	P – P	Albion Rovers	Ochilview Park, Stenhousemuir
		Report

15 January 2011 Third Division	East Stirlingshire	2 – 0	Clyde	Ochilview Park, Stenhousemuir
15:00	Walker 57' (yellow card) 12' (red card) 71'; Maguire 74'	Report		Attendance: 467; Referee: David Somers

25 January 2011 Third Division	Arbroath	3 – 5	East Stirlingshire	Gayfield Park, Arbroath
19:45	McAnespie 23'; Alan Rattray 42'; Doris 67' (pen.)	Report	Johnston 28'; Dunn 38', 64'; Maguire 46'; Beveridge 82'	Attendance: 436; Referee: T Robertson

29 January 2011 Third Division	East Stirlingshire	1 – 0	Berwick Rangers	Ochilview Park, Stenhousemuir
15:00	McLeod 31' (o.g.)	Report		Attendance: 341; Referee: John Beaton

5 February 2011 Third Division	Queen's Park	2 – 0	East Stirlingshire	Hampden Park, Glasgow
15:00	Murray 32'; Daly 37'	Report		Attendance: 504; Referee: Des Roache

12 February 2011 Third Division	Albion Rovers	2 – 0	East Stirlingshire	Cliftonhill, Coatbridge
15:00	Love 21'; Canning 90'	Report		Attendance: 346; Referee: Steven McLean

16 February 2011 Third Division	East Stirlingshire	0 – 1	Queen's Park	Ochilview Park, Stenhousemuir
19:45		Report	Daly 46'; Meggatt (yellow card) 19' (yellow-red card) 83'	Attendance: 293; Referee: Neil Watters

19 February 2011 Third Division	East Stirlingshire	0 – 2	Stranraer	Ochilview Park, Stenhousemuir
15:00		Report	Agnew 42'; Oné 81'	Attendance: 294; Referee: Matt Northcroft

23 February 2011 Third Division	Stranraer	4 – 1	East Stirlingshire	Stair Park, Stranraer
19:45	Agnew 6'; Oné 34', 37', 67'	Report	Maguire 15'	Attendance: 269; Referee: John Beaton

26 February 2011 Third Division	Annan Athletic	2 – 1	East Stirlingshire	Galabank, Annan
15:00	Gilfillan 67'; Neilson 76'	Report	Cawley 59'	Attendance: 402; Referee: Bobby Madden

2 March 2011 Third Division	East Stirlingshire	0 – 0	Albion Rovers	Ochilview Park, Stenhousemuir
19:45		Report		Attendance: 226; Referee: Steven Nicholls

8 March 2011 Third Division	Berwick Rangers	3 – 0	East Stirlingshire	Shielfield Park, Berwick-upon-Tweed
19:45	Gribben 12', 79'; McLean 45'	Report		Attendance: 266; Referee: Bobby Madden

12 March 2011 Third Division	Clyde	P – P	East Stirlingshire	Broadwood Stadium, Cumbernauld
15:00

22 March 2011 Third Division	Montrose	0 – 2	East Stirlingshire	Links Park, Montrose
19:45		Report	Neill 44'; Team 90+2'	Attendance: 259; Referee: Craig Charleston

5 March 2011 Third Division	East Stirlingshire	1 – 2	Montrose	Ochilview Park, Stenhousemuir
15:00	Weaver 8'	Report	Boyle 46'; Smith 59'	Attendance: 306; Referee: Kevin Clancy

15 March 2011 Third Division	East Stirlingshire	1 – 5	Annan Athletic	Ochilview Park, Stenhousemuir
19:45	Johnston 64'	Report	Harty 2'; Cox 15'; O'Connor 29'; Docherty 48'; Bell 90'	Attendance: 178; Referee: Brian Colvin

19 March 2011 Third Division	East Stirlingshire	2 – 5	Arbroath	Ochilview Park, Stenhousemuir
15:00	Cawley 27'; Scott 82'	Report	Chisholm 43'; Doris 58'; Swankie 63', 78', 90'	Attendance: 349; Referee: Neil Watters

26 March 2011 Third Division	Berwick Rangers	1 – 1	East Stirlingshire	Shielfield Park, Berwick-upon-Tweed
15:00	Brazil 90'	Report	Neill 5'	Attendance: 367; Referee: Crawford Allan

2 April 2011 Third Division	East Stirlingshire	3 – 2	Queen's Park	Ochilview Park, Stenhousemuir
15:00	Johnston 29'; Cawley 41', 90'	Report	Capuano 9'; Beveridge 55' (o.g.)	Attendance: 391; Referee: Don Robertson

9 April 2011 Third Division	Stranraer	2 – 0	East Stirlingshire	Stair Park, Stranraer
15:00	Kennedy 35'; Winter 50'	Report		Attendance: 373; Referee: Des Roache

16 April 2011 Third Division	East Stirlingshire	1 – 2	Albion Rovers	Ochilview Park, Stenhousemuir
19:45	Kelly 65'	Report	Lawless 55'; McGowan 62'	Attendance: 323; Referee: Paul Robertson

19 April 2011 Third Division	Clyde	2 – 0	East Stirlingshire	Broadwood Stadium, Cumbernauld
19:45	Stewart 53', 75' (pen.)	Report		Attendance: 591; Referee: Don Robertson

23 April 2011 Third Division	East Stirlingshire	2 – 1	Elgin City	Ochilview Park, Stenhousemuir
15:00	Maguire 27'; Dunn 85'	Report	Crooks 39'	Attendance: 215; Referee: Greg Aitken

30 April 2011 Third Division	Montrose	3 – 0	East Stirlingshire	Links Park, Montrose
15:00	Pierce 8', 17', Nicoll 11' (pen.)	Report		Attendance: 361; Referee: F McDermott

7 May 2011 Third Division	East Stirlingshire	2 – 0	Annan Athletic	Ochilview Park, Stenhousemuir
15:00	Cawley 42', 90'	Report		Attendance: 322; Referee: Kevin Clancy

==== League table ====
Pos	Team	Pld	W	D	L	GF	GA	GD	Pts
6	Berwick Rangers	36	12	13	11	62	56	+6	49
7	Elgin City	36	13	6	17	53	63	−10	45
8	Montrose	36	10	7	19	47	61	−14	37
9	East Stirlingshire	36	10	4	22	33	62	−29	34
10	Clyde	36	8	8	20	37	67	−30	32

Source: SPFL
Rules for classification: 1) points; 2) goal difference; 3) number of goals scored.

==== Results summary ====
Overall								Home						Away					
Pld	W	D	L	GF	GA	GD	Pts	W	D	L	GF	GA	GD	W	D	L	GF	GA	GD
36	10	4	22	33	62	−29	34	6	3	9	18	27	−9	4	1	13	15	35	−20

Last updated: 11 May 2012.
Source: soccerway.com

==== Results by round ====
Round	1	2	3	4	5	6	7	8	9	10	11	12	13	14	15	16	17	18	19	20	21	22	23	24	25	26	27	28	29	30	31	32	33	34	35	36
Ground	A	H	A	A	H	A	H	A	A	H	A	H	H	H	A	H	A	A	H	H	A	A	H	A	A	H	H	H	A	H	A	H	A	H	A	H
Result	L	W	W	L	D	L	D	L	L	L	W	L	L	W	W	W	L	L	L	L	L	L	D	L	L	L	L	W	D	W	L	L	L	W	L	W
Position	10	7	3	6	6	6	6	8	9	9	8	8	8	8	8	7	8	9	9	9	9	9	9	9	9	9	9	9	8	8	9	9	10	9	10	9

Source: statto.com
A = Away; H = Home; W = Win; D = Draw; L = Loss

=== Scottish Cup ===
23 October 2010 Round 2	Forres Mechanics	0 – 0	East Stirlingshire	Mosset Park, Forres
15:00		Report

30 October 2010 Round 2 (replay)	East Stirlingshire	4 – 0	Forres Mechanics	Ochilview Park, Stenhousemuir
15:00	Cawley 29', 40', 48'; Dunn 75'	Report	Knight (red card) 73'	Attendance: 326; Referee: Des Roache

20 November 2010 Round 3	Spartans	1 – 2	East Stirlingshire	Ainslie Park, Edinburgh
15:00	McLeod 54'	Report	Weaver 42'; Dunn 69'	Attendance: 601; Referee: K Clancy

9 January 2011 Round 4	East Stirlingshire	P – P	Buckie Thistle	Ochilview Park, Stenhousemuir
15:00		Report

19 January 2011 Round 4	East Stirlingshire	1 – 0	Buckie Thistle	Ochilview Park, Stenhousemuir
19:45	Cawley 88'	Report	Murray (red card) 44'	Attendance: 630; Referee: Anthony Law

=== Scottish League Cup ===
1 August 2010 Round 1	East Stirlingshire	1 – 2	Alloa Athletic	Ochilview Park, Stenhousemuir
15:00	Cawley 17'	Report	Prunty 45+1'; Tully 60' (o.g.)	Attendance: 543; Referee: Bobby Madden

=== Scottish Challenge Cup ===
24 July 2010 Round 1	Stranraer	1 – 2 (a.e.t.)	East Stirlingshire	Stair Park, Stranraer
15:00	McColm 78'	Report	Cawley 51'; Richardson 117'	Attendance: 269; Referee: Eddie Smith

10 August 2010 Round 2	Peterhead	6 – 1	East Stirlingshire	Balmoor, Peterhead
19:45	Smith 14'; Hay 54' (o.g.); Bavidge 66'; MacDonald 71', 74'; Gethans 84'	Report	Maguire 38' (pen.)	Attendance: 368; Referee: G Simpson

== Footnotes ==
1. The club ground-shared Ochilview Park, the home of local rivals Stenhousemuir.
2. East Stirlingshire defeated Buckie Thistle 1–0 in the fourth round but were expelled due to fielding an ineligible player. Buckie Thistle qualified for the fifth round.
