= 2011–12 Berwick Rangers F.C. season =

Berwick Rangers
2011–12 season
- Chairman: Brian Porteous
- Manager: Jimmy Crease (until 26 October 2011); Ian Little (caretaker)
- Stadium: Shielfield Park
- Scottish Third Division: Seventh
- Challenge Cup: Semi-final
- League Cup: Second round
- Scottish Cup: Second round
- Top goalscorer: League: Damon Gray (9); All: Damon Gray (7); Darren Gribben (7); Danny Handling (7)
- Highest home attendance: 486 vs. Alloa Athletic, 14 April 2012
- Lowest home attendance: 278 vs. Peterhead, 28 February 2012

The 2011–12 season was Berwick Rangers's seventh consecutive season in the Scottish Third Division, having been relegated from the Scottish Second Division at the end of the 2004–05 season. Berwick also competed in the Challenge Cup, League Cup and Scottish Cup.

== Summary ==
Berwick Rangers finished seventh in the Third Division. They reached the semi-final of the Challenge Cup, the second round of the League Cup and the second round of the Scottish Cup.

=== Management ===
They began the 2011–12 season under the management of Jimmy Crease. On 26 October 2011, Crease stepped down following their defeat to Deveronvale. Ian Little was made caretaker manager and after some good results, Berwick announced in mid-November that Little would stay in charge until 31 December, when matters will be re-assessed. On 28 December 2011, Berwick Rangers announced that Little would remain as manager until at least the end of the 2011–12 season. On 17 March 2012, Berwick Rangers announced that Little would remain as manager on a permanent basis.

== Results & fixtures ==
Win Draw Loss Postponed

=== Third Division ===
6 August 2011 Scottish Third Division	Elgin City	4–1	Berwick Rangers	Borough Briggs
	Gunn 17', 20' (pen.), 51', 70'	BBC Report	Currie 84'	Attendance: 534; Referee: McKendrick

13 August 2011 Scottish Third Division	Berwick Rangers	4–2	East Stirlingshire	Shielfield Park
	Currie 9' (pen.), 90'; Gray 50'; McLaren 71'	BBC Report	Jackson (red card) 71'; Love 75' (pen.); Gibson 88'	Attendance: 441; Referee: Dallas

20 August 2011 Scottish Third Division	Stranraer	2–1	Berwick Rangers	Stair Park
	Aitken 62'; Malcolm 64'	BBC Report	McLaren 77'	Attendance: 260; Referee: Cook

27 August 2011 Scottish Third Division	Queen's Park	1–1	Berwick Rangers	Hampden Park
	Daly 60'	BBC Report	McDonald 20'	Attendance: 504; Referee: Anderson

10 September 2011 Scottish Third Division	Berwick Rangers	1–2	Montrose	Shielfield Park
	McLaren 11'; Townsley (red card) 80'	BBC Report	Winter 23'; Pierce 81' (pen.); Masson (yellow card) 81' (red card)	Attendance: 368; Referee: Roache

17 September 2011 Scottish Third Division	Berwick Rangers	2–1	Peterhead	Shielfield Park
	McLaren 12', 43'	BBC Report	McAllister 15' (pen.)	Attendance: 334; Referee: Madden

24 September 2011 Scottish Third Division	Clyde	1–4	Berwick Rangers	Broadwood Stadium
	Neill 48'	BBC Report	Gray 41'; Gribben 54', 56'; Smith 90'	Attendance: 618; Referee: Somers

1 October 2011 Scottish Third Division	Berwick Rangers	0–1	Annan Athletic	Shielfield Park
	Gribben (red card) 81'	BBC Report	Gibson 71'	Attendance: 412; Referee: Aitken

15 October 2011 Scottish Third Division	Alloa Athletic	1–1	Berwick Rangers	Recreation Park
15:00	Holmes 7'	SFL Report	McLeod 16'	Attendance: 442; Referee: Robertson

29 October 2011 Scottish Third Division	East Stirlingshire	P – P	Berwick Rangers	Ochilview Park
15:00

5 November 2011 Scottish Third Division	Berwick Rangers	1–1	Elgin City	Shielfield Park
15:00	Greenhill (red card) 14'; Gribben 45'	SFL Report	Gunn 34'	Attendance: 327; Referee: Finnie

9 November 2011 Scottish Third Division	East Stirlingshire	1–3	Berwick Rangers	Ochilview Park
19:45	Coyne 17'	SFL Report	Gribben 7', 66' (Penalty); McLean 31'	Attendance: 310; Referee: Dallas

12 November 2011 Scottish Third Division	Berwick Rangers	2–0	Queen's Park	Shielfield Park
15:00	Noble 80'; Gray 82'	SFL Report		Attendance: 449; Referee: Barry Cook

26 November 2011 Scottish Third Division	Montrose	3–5	Berwick Rangers	Links Park
15:00	Boyle 9'; Lunan 50'; Cameron 86'	SFL Report	Gribben 20', 25'; Noble 60', 79'; Gray 90'	Attendance: 328; Referee: Clancy

3 December 2011 Scottish Third Division	Berwick Rangers	0–2	Clyde	Shielfield Park
15:00		SFL Report	Sweeney 25' (Penalty); Cusack 86'	Attendance: 410; Referee: Somers

10 November 2011 Scottish Third Division	Peterhead	P – P	Berwick Rangers	Balmoor Stadium
15:00

17 December 2011 Scottish Third Division	Berwick Rangers	2–2	Alloa Athletic	Shielfield Park
15:00	Deland 78'; Gray 84'	SFL Report	McCord 44'; May 61'	Attendance: 362; Referee: Allan

20 December 2011 Scottish Third Division	Peterhead	1–0	Berwick Rangers	Balmoor Stadium
19:45	McAllister 45' (pen.)	SFL Report		Attendance: 438; Referee: Salmond

24 December 2011 Scottish Third Division	Annan Athletic	2–2	Berwick Rangers	Galabank
15:00	Watson 18'; Harty 41'; McGowan (red card) 53'	Report	Gibson 77' (Own Goal); Gribben 82'; Notman (yellow card) 91' (red card)	Attendance: 598; Referee: Barry Cook

2 January 2012 Scottish Third Division	Berwick Rangers	2–2	Montrose	Shielfield Park
15:00	Deland 15'; Greenhill 62'	SFL Report	Johnston 45'; Boyle 58'	Attendance: 455; Referee: Anderson

7 January 2012 Scottish Third Division	Queen's Park	P – P	Berwick Rangers	Hampden Park
15:00

14 January 2012 Scottish Third Division	Berwick Rangers	2–2	Stranraer	Shielfield Park
15:00	Notman 10'; Lee Currie 32'	SFL Report	McColm 6'; Malcolm 75'	Attendance: 438; Referee: Salmond

21 January 2012 Scottish Third Division	Elgin City	4–0	Berwick Rangers	Borough Briggs
15:00	Millar 35', 53'; MacPhee 37'; Leslie 49'	SFL Report	McDonald (red card) 60'	Attendance: 438; Referee: Roache

28 January 2012 Scottish Third Division	Clyde	P – P	Berwick Rangers	Broadwood Stadium
15:00

4 February 2012 Scottish Third Division	Berwick Rangers	P – P	Peterhead	Shielfield Park
15:00

11 February 2012 Scottish Third Division	Alloa Athletic	0–1	Berwick Rangers	Recreation Park
15:00		SFL Report	Gray 59' (Penalty); Notman (yellow card) 84' (red card)	Attendance: 544; Referee: Dallas

15 February 2012 Scottish Third Division	Clyde	2–2	Berwick Rangers	Broadwood Stadium
19:45	Brown 6'; Neill 13'; Gray (red card) 45'	SFL Report	Walker 29'; Gray 90'	Attendance: 351; Referee: Aitken

18 February 2012 Scottish Third Division	Berwick Rangers	2–3	Annan Athletic	Shielfield Park
15:00	Gribben 80'; Walker (yellow card) 86' (red card)	SFL Report	Cox 19'; Winters 20'; O'Connor 59'	Attendance: 389; Referee: Barry Cook

21 February 2012 Scottish Third Division	Queen's Park	2–2	Berwick Rangers	Hampden Park
19:30	Watt 26'; Quinn 90'	SFL Report	Gribben 21'; Greenhill 90'	Attendance: 413; Referee: Robertson

25 February 2012 Scottish Third Division	Berwick Rangers	0–2	East Stirlingshire	Shielfield Park
15:00		SFL Report	Dingwall 40'; Turner 84'	Attendance: 349; Referee: Robertson

28 February 2012 Scottish Third Division	Berwick Rangers	0–1	Peterhead	Shielfield Park
19:45		SFL Report	Bavidge 83'	Attendance: 278; Referee: Somers

3 March 2012 Scottish Third Division	Stranraer	1–3	Berwick Rangers	Stair Park
15:00	McColm 45'	SFL Report	Noble 27'; McLaren 68'; Ferguson 80'	Attendance: 330; Referee: Anderson

10 March 2012 Scottish Third Division	Montrose	1–1	Berwick Rangers	Links Park
15:00	Boyle 49'	SFL Report	Gray 80'	Attendance: 318; Referee: Beaton

17 March 2012 Scottish Third Division	Berwick Rangers	1–4	Queen's Park	Shielfield Park
15:00	Greenhill 57'	SFL Report	Brough 54'; McBride 61'; Forster 64' (own goal); Daly 79'	Attendance: 428; Referee: Conroy

24 March 2012 Scottish Third Division	Peterhead	1–2	Berwick Rangers	Balmoor Stadium
15:00	McAllister 49' (Penalty)	SFL Report	Handling 23', 56'; Forster (red card) 58'	Attendance: 396; Referee: McDermott

31 March 2012 Scottish Third Division	Berwick Rangers	3–0	Clyde	Shielfield Park
15:00	Handling 31', 35'; Currie 88'	SFL Report		Attendance: 389; Referee: Roache

7 April 2012 Scottish Third Division	Annan Athletic	1–1	Berwick Rangers	Galabank
15:00	Muirhead 24'	SFL Report	Townsley (yellow card) 50' (red card); Forster 72'	Attendance: 430; Referee: Steven

14 April 2012 Scottish Third Division	Berwick Rangers	5–0	Alloa Athletic	Shielfield Park
15:00	Handling 13', 51'; Currie 14'; Harding 34' (Own goal); Noble 58'	SFL Report		Attendance: 486; Referee: Anderson

21 April 2012 Scottish Third Division	Berwick Rangers	3–3	Elgin City	Shielfield Park
15:00	McDonald 1'; Forster 45'; Noble 53'; McLean (yellow card) 87' (red card)	SFL Report	Durnan 23'; Crooks 75'; Gunn 77'	Attendance: 411; Referee: Somers

28 April 2012 Scottish Third Division	East Stirlingshire	2–1	Berwick Rangers	Ochilview Park
15:00	Horner 6'; Sheerin 18'; Frances (yellow card) 70' (red card)	SFL Report	Notman (red card) 52'; Currie 70' (Penalty)	Attendance: 277; Referee: Aitken

5 May 2012 Scottish Third Division	Berwick Rangers	1–0	Stranraer	Shielfield Park
15:00	Handling 70'; Miller (yellow card) 84' (red card)	SFL Report		Attendance: 402; Referee: Barry Cook

=== Challenge Cup ===
23 July 2011 Challenge Cup Rd 1	Clyde	2–2 (3–4 p)	Berwick Rangers	Broadwood Stadium
	Fitzpatrick 36'; McDonald 51'	BBC Report	Currie 4'; Gray 10'	Attendance: 472; Referee: O'Reilly

9 August 2011 Challenge Cup Quarter-final	Dumbarton	2–2	Berwick Rangers	Strathclyde Homes Stadium
		BBC Report	Greenhill 55'; Currie 89'	Attendance: 334; Referee: Charleston

4 September 2011 Challenge Cup Semi-final	Berwick Rangers	1–2	Livingston	Shielfield Park
15:00	McDonald 52'	BBC Report	Scougall 12'; Russell 85'	Attendance: 567; Referee: Beaton

=== Scottish League Cup ===
30 July 2011 League Cup round 1	Partick Thistle	1–3	Berwick Rangers	Firhill Stadium
	Cairney 28'; Paton (red card) 47'; Balatoni (red card) 79'	BBC Report	Gray 33'; Noble 73'; P. Currie 79' (pen.) McDonald (yellow card) 81' (red card)	Attendance: 1,255; Referee: McLean

23 August 2011 League Cup round 2	Hibernian	5–0	Berwick Rangers	Easter Road
	Scott 11', 58'; Sodje 38'; O'Connor 51'; Sproule 87'	BBC Report		Attendance: 4,936; Referee: Finnie

=== Scottish Cup ===
22 October 2011 Scottish Cup round 2	Deveronvale	4–0	Berwick Rangers	Princess Royal Park
15:00	Duncan 19'; Fraser 29'; Blackhall 66'; McKenzie 71' (Penalty)	Sky Report	Thomson (red card) 69'	Attendance: 650; Referee: Robertson

=== East of Scotland Cup ===
7 January 2012 Final	Berwick Rangers	2–0	Edinburgh City	Shielfield Park
15:00	Gribben 5'; Gray 48'			Attendance: 122; Referee: ??

== Player statistics ==
=== Squad ===
Last updated 5 May 2012

No.	Pos	Nat	Player	Total		Third Division		Scottish Cup		League Cup		Challenge Cup	
No.	Pos	Nat	Player	Apps	Goals	Apps	Goals	Apps	Goals	Apps	Goals	Apps	Goals
	GK	(Scotland) SCO	Jamie Barclay	35	0	29	0	1	0	2	0	3	0
	GK	(Scotland) SCO	Youssef Bejaoui	7	0	7	0	0	0	0	0	0	0
	GK	(Scotland) SCO	Ian McCaldon	0	0	0	0	0	0	0	0	0	0
	GK	(Scotland) SCO	Mark Peat	0	0	0	0	0	0	0	0	0	0
	GK	(Scotland) SCO	Gavin Sorley	0	0	0	0	0	0	0	0	0	0
	DF	(Scotland) SCO	Michael Deland	18	2	18	2	0	0	0	0	0	0
	DF	(Scotland) SCO	Stephen Thompson	24	0	18	0	1	0	2	0	3	0
	DF	(Scotland) SCO	Guy Kerr	0	0	0	0	0	0	0	0	0	0
	DF	(Scotland) SCO	Andy McLean	31	1	27	1	1	0	2	0	1	0
	DF	(Scotland) SCO	Chris McLeod	19	0	14	0	0	0	2	0	3	0
	DF	(Scotland) SCO	Steven Notman	32	1	29	1	1	0	1	0	1	0
	DF	(Scotland) SCO	Elliott Smith	18	1	13	1	1	0	2	0	2	0
	DF	(Scotland) SCO	Chris Townsley	31	0	28	0	0	0	1	0	2	0
	DF	(Scotland) SCO	Richard Walker	21	1	16	1	1	0	2	0	2	0
	DF	(Scotland) SCO	Stephen Tulloch	4	0	4	0	0	0	0	0	0	0
	DF	(Scotland) SCO	Conner McGlinchey	11	0	11	0	0	0	0	0	0	0
	DF	(Scotland) SCO	Jordon Forster	10	2	10	2	0	0	0	0	0	0
	MF	(Scotland) SCO	Kevin McDonald	35	3	30	2	1	0	1	0	3	1
	MF	(Scotland) SCO	Darren Smith	5	0	4	0	0	0	0	0	1	0
	MF	(Scotland) SCO	Lee Currie	37	6	32	4	1	0	2	0	2	2
	MF	(Scotland) SCO	Paul Currie (footballer)	10	4	5	3	0	0	2	1	3	0
	MF	(Scotland) SCO	David Greenhill	29	4	26	3	0	0	1	0	2	1
	MF	(Scotland) SCO	Fraser McLaren	28	5	25	5	0	0	1	0	2	0
	MF	(Scotland) SCO	Aaron Ponton	3	0	2	0	0	0	0	0	1	0
	MF	(Scotland) SCO	Ross Gray	20	1	19	1	1	0	0	0	0	0
	MF	(Scotland) SCO	Ben Miller	4	0	4	0	0	0	0	0	0	0
	FW	(England) ENG	Damon Gray	35	9	29	7	1	0	2	1	3	1
	FW	(Scotland) SCO	Darren Gribben	32	7	27	7	1	0	2	0	2	0
	FW	(Scotland) SCO	Danny Handling	7	7	7	7	0	0	0	0	0	0
	FW	(Scotland) SCO	Stuart Noble	38	7	32	6	1	0	2	1	3	0
	FW	(Scotland) SCO	Ian Little	5	0	4	0	1	0	0	0	0	0
	FW	(Scotland) SCO	Darren Lavery	8	0	8	0	0	0	0	0	0	0
	FW	(Scotland) SCO	John Ferguson	12	1	12	1	0	0	0	0	0	0

=== Disciplinary record ===
Includes all competitive matches.

Last updated 5 May 2012

Nation	Position	Name	Third Division		Scottish Cup		League Cup		Challenge Cup		Total	
Nation	Position	Name	Yellow card	Red card	Yellow card	Red card	Yellow card	Red card	Yellow card	Red card	Yellow card	Red card
(Scotland)	GK	Jamie Barclay	0	0	0	0	0	0	0	0	0	0
(Scotland)	GK	Youssef Bejaoui	1	0	0	0	0	0	0	0	1	0
(Scotland)	GK	Ian McCaldon	0	0	0	0	0	0	0	0	0	0
(Scotland)	GK	Mark Peat	0	0	0	0	0	0	0	0	0	0
(Scotland)	GK	Gavin Sorley	0	0	0	0	0	0	0	0	0	0
(Scotland)	DF	Michael Deland	3	0	0	0	0	0	0	0	3'	0
(Scotland)	DF	Guy Kerr	0	0	0	0	0	0	0	0	0	0
(Scotland)	DF	Andy McLean	6	1	0	0	1	0	0	0	7	1
(Scotland)	DF	Chris McLeod	1	0	0	0	1	0	0	0	2	0
(Scotland)	DF	Stephen Thompson	0	0	0	1	0	0	2	0	2	1
(Scotland)	DF	Chris Townsley	3	2	0	0	0	0	0	0	3	2
(Scotland)	DF	Elliott Smith	2	0	1	0	0	0	0	0	3	0
(Scotland)	DF	Richard Walker	3	1	0	0	0	0	0	0	3	1
(Scotland)	DF	Stephen Tulloch	2	0	0	0	0	0	0	0	2	0
(Scotland)	DF	Conner McGlinchey	1	0	0	0	0	0	0	0	1	0
(Scotland)	DF	Jordon Forster	3	1	0	0	0	0	0	0	3	1
(Scotland)	MF	Darren Smith	0	0	0	0	0	0	0	0	0	0
(Scotland)	MF	Kevin McDonald	6	1	1	0	1	1	1	0	9	2
(Scotland)	MF	Steven Notman	7	3	0	0	0	0	0	0	7	3
(Scotland)	MF	Lee Currie	9	0	0	0	2	0	1	0	12	0
(Scotland)	MF	Paul Currie (footballer)	1	0	0	0	1	0	1	0	3	0
(Scotland)	MF	David Greenhill	2	1	0	0	0	0	1	0	3	1
(Scotland)	MF	Fraser McLaren	1	0	0	0	1	0	2	0	4	0
(Scotland)	MF	Aaron Ponton	0	0	0	0	0	0	0	0	0	0
(Scotland)	MF	Ross Gray	2	0	0	0	0	0	0	0	2	0
(Scotland)	MF	Ben Miller	2	1	0	0	0	0	0	0	2	1
(England)	FW	Damon Gray	0	0	0	0	0	0	0	0	0	0
(Scotland)	FW	Darren Gribben	3	1	0	0	0	0	0	0	3	1
(Scotland)	FW	Danny Handling	0	0	0	0	0	0	0	0	0	0
(Scotland)	FW	Ian Little	0	0	0	0	0	0	0	0	0	0
(Scotland)	FW	Darren Lavery	0	0	0	0	0	0	0	0	0	0
(Scotland)	FW	John Ferguson	0	0	0	0	0	0	0	0	0	0

=== Awards ===
Last updated 24 December 2011

Nation	Name	Award	Month
(Scotland)	Ian Little	Third Division Manager of the Month	November
(Scotland)	Darren Gribben	Ginger Boot Winner	November

== League table ==
Pos	Team	Pld	W	D	L	GF	GA	GD	Pts
5	Peterhead	36	15	6	15	51	53	−2	51
6	Annan Athletic	36	13	10	13	53	53	0	49
7	Berwick Rangers	36	12	12	12	61	58	+3	48
8	Montrose	36	11	5	20	58	75	−17	38
9	Clyde	36	8	11	17	35	50	−15	35

Source: SPFL Archive
Rules for classification: 1) points; 2) goal difference; 3) number of goals scored.

== Transfers ==
=== Players in ===
Player	From	Fee
(Scotland) Richard Walker	(Scotland) Brechin	Free
(Scotland) Chris Townsley	(Scotland) Spartans	Free
(Scotland) Stephen Thompson	(Scotland) Stenhousemuir	Free
(Scotland) Stuart Noble	(Scotland) Alloa Athletic	Free
(Scotland) Darren Smith	(Scotland) Albion Rovers	Free
(Scotland) Jamie Barclay	(Scotland) Falkirk	Free
(Scotland) Michael Deland	(Scotland) Heart of Midlothian	Free
(Scotland) Kevin McDonald	(Scotland) Alloa Athletic	Free
(Scotland) Ross Gray	(Scotland) Livingston	Loan
(Scotland) Gavin Sorley	(Scotland) East Stirlingshire	Free
(Scotland) John Ferguson	(Scotland) Cowdenbeath	Free
(Scotland) Stephen Tulloch	(Scotland) Forfar Athletic	Loan
(Scotland) Conner McGlinchey	(Scotland) Hamilton Academical	Loan
(Scotland) Jordon Forster	(Scotland) Hibernian	Loan
(Scotland) Youssef Bejaoui	(Scotland) Cowdenbeath	Loan
(Scotland) Danny Handling	(Scotland) Hibernian	Loan

=== Players out ===
Player	To	Fee
(Scotland) Stuart Callaghan	(Scotland) Beith Juniors	Free
(Scotland) Alan Brazil		Retired
(Scotland) Kevin Gordon	Free agent	Free
(Scotland) John Grant	(Scotland) Spartans	Free
(Scotland) Craig O'Reilly	(Scotland) Penicuik Athletic	Free
(Scotland) Jamie Ewart	(Scotland) Bonnyrigg Rose	Free
(Scotland) Mark Peat	(Scotland) Beith Juniors	Free
(Scotland) Guy Kerr	Free agent	Free
(Scotland) Robert Baillie	Free agent	Free
(Scotland) Paul Currie	(Scotland) Hamilton Academical	Undisclosed
(England) Ian McCaldon	Free agent	Free
(Scotland) Arran Ponton	(Scotland) Arniston Rangers	Loan
(Scotland) Stephen Thomson	(Scotland) Bonnyrigg Rose	Loan
(Scotland) Gavin Sorley	(Scotland) Kinnoull	Free
(Scotland) Darren Gribben	(Scotland) Bo'ness United	Loan
(Scotland) Darren Lavery	(Scotland) Tranent	Loan
