= Stuart Mills =

Stuart Mills is the name of:

- Stu Mills (born 1982), New Zealand cricketer
- Stuart Mills (footballer) (born 1990), Scottish footballer

== See also ==
- Stewart Mills, Australian rugby player
