= Guy Kerr =

Scottish footballer

Personal information
- Date of birth: 3 April 1988 (age 38)
- Place of birth: Edinburgh, Scotland
- Positions: Striker; defender

Senior career*
Years	Team	Apps	(Gls)
2006–2009	Inverness Caledonian Thistle	11	(1)
2008	→ Elgin City (loan)	14	(2)
2009	→ East Fife (loan)		
2009–2010	East Fife	11	(1)
2010	→ Berwick Rangers (loan)	10	(0)
2010–2012	Berwick Rangers	0	(0)
Total		46	(4)
- * Club domestic league appearances and goals

Guy Kerr (born 3 April 1988) is a Scottish former professional footballer. He played for Inverness Caledonian Thistle, Elgin City, East Fife and Berwick Rangers. Through most of his career he played as a striker, but moved to play as a defender later in his career.

== Career ==
Kerr made his professional debut on 3 May 2008 in a 6–1 win over Gretna. He came on as a substitute in the 86th minute for Ian Black. Guy scored his first goal on 27 September 2008 in a 5–2 loss to East Stirlingshire while on loan at Elgin City.

== Career statistics ==
Appearances and goals by club, season and competition
Club	Season	League			National Cup		League Cup		Other		Total	
Club	Season	Division	Apps	Goals	Apps	Goals	Apps	Goals	Apps	Goals	Apps	Goals
Inverness Caledonian Thistle	2006–07	Scottish Premier League	1	0	0	0	0	0	0	0	1	0
Inverness Caledonian Thistle	2007–08	Scottish Premier League	10	1	2	0	0	0	0	0	12	1
Inverness Caledonian Thistle	2008–09	Scottish Premier League	0	0	0	0	0	0	0	0	0	0
Inverness Caledonian Thistle	Total		11	1	2	0	0	0	0	0	13	1
Elgin City (loan)	2008–09	Scottish Third Division	14	2	1	0	0	0	0	0	15	2
East Fife (loan)	2008–09	Scottish Second Division	0	0	0	0	0	0	0	0	0	0
East Fife	2009–10	Scottish Second Division	11	1	0	0	0	0	0	0	11	1
Berwick Rangers (loan)	2009–10	Scottish Third Division	10	0	0	0	0	0	0	0	10	0
Berwick Rangers	2010–11	Scottish Third Division	0	0	0	0	0	0	0	0	0	0
Berwick Rangers	2011–12	Scottish Third Division	0	0	0	0	0	0	0	0	0	0
Berwick Rangers	2012–13	Scottish Third Division	0	0	0	0	0	0	0	0	0	0
Berwick Rangers	Total		0	0	0	0	0	0	0	0	0	0
Career total			46	4	3	0	0	0	0	0	49	4
