= Paul Hayes =

Paul Hayes or Hays may refer to:

- Paul Hays, reading clerk
- Paul R. Hays (1903–1980), American judge
- Paul Hayes (footballer) (born 1983), English footballer
- Paul Hayes (antiques expert) (born 1970), English antiques expert
- Paul Hayes (historian) (1942–1995), English academic

== See also ==
- Paul Hay, footballer
