= Paul McMullan =

Paul McMullan may refer to:

- Paul McMullan (footballer, born 1984), Scottish footballer (Heart of Midlothian, Queen of the South, Raith Rovers, Hamilton Academical)
- Paul McMullan (footballer, born 1996), Scottish footballer (Celtic and Dundee United)
- Paul McMullan (journalist) (born 1963), British tabloid journalist with the News of the World newspaper

== See also ==
- Paul McMullen (1972–2021), American middle-distance runner
