= Ian Watt (disambiguation) =

Ian Watt (1917–1999), was an English-born literary critic.

Ian Watt may refer to:

- Ian Watt (public servant), Australian public service departmental head
- Ian Watt (footballer), Scottish footballer, see 2011–12 Berwick Rangers F.C. season
