= Dominico Gibson =

Scottish footballer

Personal information
- Date of birth: 9 June 1992 (age 34)
- Place of birth: Edinburgh, Scotland
- Position: Midfielder

Team information
- Current team: Civil Service Strollers

Senior career*
Years	Team	Apps	(Gls)
2009–2011	Aberdeen	1	(0)
2011–2012	East Stirlingshire	11	(2)
2014–2017	Edinburgh City		
2018	Kelty Hearts		
2018	Lothian Thistle		
2018–2020	Broxburn Athletic		
2020–	Civil Service Strollers		
- * Club domestic league appearances and goals as of 10 October 2020 (UTC)

Dominico "Nico" Gibson (born 9 June 1992) is a Scottish professional footballer who plays as a defender or midfielder for Civil Service Strollers.

He has previously played for Aberdeen, East Stirlingshire, Edinburgh City, Kelty Hearts and Broxburn Athletic.

== Career ==
Gibson signed for Aberdeen in June 2009 playing for the under 19's. He made his one and only appearance for the Aberdeen first team on the final day of the season against St Mirren on 8 May 2010.

On 12 August 2011, Gibson signed for East Stirlingshire having been released by Aberdeen in the summer.

Gibson left East Stirlingshire in 2012 after scoring two goals in 11 games with the club. Gibson subsequently signed for Edinburgh City in 2014, where he spent three seasons before being released in 2017.

Gibson has a short spell at Kelty Hearts before signing for Broxburn Athletic.

Civil Service Strollers announced they had signed Gibson on 10 October 2020.

== Career statistics ==
As of 15 August 2013

Club statistics
Club	Season	League		Scottish Cup		League Cup		Other		Total	
Club	Season	App	Goals	App	Goals	App	Goals	App	Goals	App	Goals
Aberdeen	2009–10 season	1	0	0	0	0	0	0	0	1	0
Aberdeen	2010–11 season	0	0	0	0	0	0	0	0	0	0
East Stirlingshire	2011–12 season	11	2	0	0	0	0	0	0	11	2
Total		12	2	0	0	0	0	0	0	12	2
