= Conner McGlinchey =

Scottish footballer

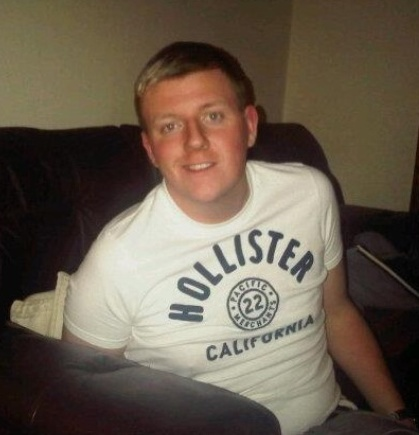

Personal information
- Date of birth: 22 May 1993 (age 33)
- Place of birth: Scotland
- Position: Full-back

Team information
- Current team: Beith Juniors

Youth career
- Hamilton Academical

Senior career*
Years	Team	Apps	(Gls)
2011–2013	Hamilton Academical	13	(0)
2012	→ Berwick Rangers (loan)	11	(0)
2013–2014	Peterhead	25	(0)
2014–2016	Arthurlie		
2016–	Beith Juniors		
- * Club domestic league appearances and goals as of 11:54, 23 September 2018 (UTC)

Conner McGlinchey (born 22 May 1993) is a Scottish professional footballer who plays for Beith Juniors in the Lowland League West. He has previously played in the Scottish Premier League for Hamilton Academical.

== Career ==
McGlinchey made his senior debut for Hamilton Academical on 14 May 2011, in a 1–2 loss against Inverness Caledonian Thistle.

In February 2012, he signed a one-year contract extension with Hamilton. Later that month, he joined Berwick Rangers on loan.

McGlinchey was released by Hamilton, by mutual consent, on 31 January 2013.

On 8 February 2013, McGlinchey signed for Peterhead until the end of the season. In July 2013, he agreed a deal to keep him at Peterhead for the 2013–14 season.

McGlinchey signed for Junior side Arthurlie in July 2014, and moved on to Beith Juniors two years later

== Career statistics ==
As of 27 March 2014

Appearances and goals by club, season and competition
Club	Season	League		FA Cup		League Cup		Other		Total	
Club	Season	Apps	Goals	Apps	Goals	Apps	Goals	Apps	Goals	Apps	Goals
Hamilton Academical	2010–11	1	0	0	0	0	0	0	0	1	0
Hamilton Academical	2011–12	1	0	0	0	0	0	0	0	1	0
Hamilton Academical	2012–13	11	0	1	0	1	0	1	0	14	0
Hamilton Academical	Total	13	0	1	0	1	0	1	0	16	0
Berwick Rangers (loan)	2011–12	11	0	0	0	0	0	0	0	11	0
Peterhead	2012–13	10	0	0	0	0	0	1	0	11	0
Peterhead	2013–14	15	0	1	0	1	0	2	0	19	0
Peterhead	Total	25	0	1	0	1	0	3	0	30	0
Career total		49	0	2	0	2	0	4	0	57	0
