= Brian McQueen =

Scottish footballer

Personal information
- Date of birth: 1 January 1991 (age 35)
- Position: Central defender

Team information
- Current team: St Roch's

Youth career
- Hamilton Academical

Senior career*
Years	Team	Apps	(Gls)
2010–2011	Hamilton Academical	2	(0)
2011	→ Bo'ness United (loan)		
2011–2016	Clyde	99	(7)
2016–	St Roch's		
- * Club domestic league appearances and goals as of 11:13, 28 July 2016 (UTC)

Brian McQueen (born 1 January 1991) is a Scottish footballer who plays as a central defender for St Roch's in the Scottish Junior Football Association, West Region. McQueen previously played for Hamilton Academical and Clyde, as well as Bo'ness United on loan.

== Career ==
McQueen began his career with Hamilton Academical, making his professional debut on 21 February 2010. He moved on loan to Bo'ness in January 2011, before signing for Clyde in summer 2011.

After sustaining a knee injury in training, McQueen missed the majority of the 2015–16 season and after his release from Clyde in the summer of 2016, he joined Junior side St Roch's.

== Career statistics ==
As of 19 April 2015

Club	Season	League		FA Cup		League Cup		Other		Total	
Club	Season	Apps	Goals	Apps	Goals	Apps	Goals	Apps	Goals	Apps	Goals
Hamilton Academical	2009–10	1	0	0	0	0	0	0	0	1	0
Hamilton Academical	2010–11	1	0	0	0	1	0	0	0	2	0
Hamilton Academical	Total	2	0	0	0	1	0	0	0	3	0
Clyde	2011–12	29	0	0	0	2	0	0	0	31	0
Clyde	2012–13	0	0	0	0	0	0	0	0	0	0
Clyde	2013–14	33	2	4	0	0	0	2	0	39	2
Clyde	2014–15	28	4	2	0	1	0	2	0	33	4
Clyde	Total	90	6	6	0	3	0	4	0	103	6
Career total		92	6	6	0	4	0	4	0	106	6
