= Fraser Milligan =

Scottish footballer

Personal information
- Full name: Fraser Milligan
- Date of birth: 19 April 1989 (age 37)
- Place of birth: Dundee, Scotland
- Position: Right back

Youth career
- 2005–2006: Dundee United

Senior career*
Years	Team	Apps	(Gls)
2006–2009	Dundee United	1	(0)
2009	Montrose (loan)	9	(0)
2009–2011	Montrose	40	(1)
2011–2012	Tayport		
- * Club domestic league appearances and goals as of 17 August 2011

Fraser Milligan (born 19 April 1989) is a Scottish footballer. He began his career with Dundee United, where he made only one first team appearance. He joined Montrose in 2009, initially on loan, before a permanent transfer later that year. He later joined Tayport, and emigrated to Australia in 2012.

== Playing career ==
Milligan was born in Dundee and joined Dundee United as an 8-year-old, first attending the Jim McLean Coaching School then graduating to Dundee United's Youth Initiative set-up at the age of 12. He plays as a right-back or wide right in midfield. In early January 2009, he was one of three United players to feature as trialists for Albion Rovers in a friendly match, although Albion chose to take only defensive colleague Sean Fleming on loan. Two months later, Milligan moved on loan to Montrose for the remainder of the season, making his debut as a substitute alongside fellow United loan player Gordon Pope in the home defeat to Forfar Athletic, who featured another loan player from United, Johnny Russell. Milligan, like Pope, made the move permanent in May. After leaving Montrose in 2011, he signed for junior club Tayport, but left them in December 2012 when he emigrated to Australia.

== Statistics ==
Club	Season	League		Cup		League Cup		Other		Total	
Club	Season	Apps	Goals	Apps	Goals	Apps	Goals	Apps	Goals	Apps	Goals
Dundee United	2007–08	1	0	–	–	–	–	–	–	1	0
Dundee United	2008–09	–	–	–	–	–	–	–	–	–	-
Dundee United	Total	1	0	–	–	–	–	–	–	1	0
Montrose (loan)	2008–09	–	–	–	–	–	–	–	–	–	-
Montrose (loan)	Total	1	0	–	–	–	–	–	–	1	0
Career total		2	0	–	–	–	–	–	–	2	0
