= John Crawford (footballer) =

Scottish footballer

Personal information
- Full name: John Crawford
- Date of birth: 23 February 1880
- Place of birth: Renton, West Dunbartonshire, Scotland
- Date of death: 1934 (aged 53–54)
- Positions: Centre half; left half

Senior career*
Years	Team	Apps	(Gls)
–	Renton		
1900–1903	Lincoln City	85	(1)
1903–1904	Nottingham Forest	13	(0)
- * Club domestic league appearances and goals

John Crawford (23 February 1880 – 1934) was a Scottish footballer who made 98 appearances in the Football League playing for Lincoln City and Nottingham Forest. Before moving to England he played for Renton. He played as a centre half or left half.
