= Calum Antell =

Welsh footballer (born 1992)

Personal information
- Date of birth: 13 June 1992 (age 34)
- Place of birth: Abergavenny, Wales
- Height: 1.88 m (6 ft 2 in)
- Position: Goalkeeper

Team information
- Current team: Berwick Rangers
- Number: 1

Youth career
- 2009–2010: Swindon Town
- 2010–2011: Hibernian

Senior career*
Years	Team	Apps	(Gls)
2011–2013	Hibernian	0	(0)
2011–2012	→ East Stirlingshire (loan)	35	(0)
2012–2013	→ East Fife (loan)	26	(0)
2013–2014	Queen of the South	10	(0)
2013–2014	→ Brechin City (loan)	4	(0)
2014–2016	Nairn County		
2016–2021	Edinburgh City	110	(0)
2021-2022	Arbroath	3	(0)
2022–	Berwick Rangers	0	(0)

International career
- Wales U19
- * Club domestic league appearances and goals as of 12:21, 17 December 2022 (UTC)

Calum Antell (born 13 June 1992) is a Welsh footballer who plays for Berwick Rangers as a goalkeeper.

== Early and personal life ==
Antell was born in Abergavenny and raised in Ebbw Vale. He began playing local football, initially as a striker.

== Club career ==
Antell joined Hibernian in June 2010 after previously playing for Swindon Town. He signed a new one-year contract with the club in July 2012. During his time with Hibernian he spent loan spells at East Stirlingshire and East Fife. He was East Stirling's 'Player of the Year' for the 2011–12 season.

After leaving Hibernian in 2013, Antell played for Queen of the South, spending a loan spell at Brechin City during his time there. Antell was released by Queens in May 2014 and signed for Nairn County later that year. He left Nairn in July 2016, with his contract being cancelled by mutual consent.

Following his departure from Nairn, Antell signed for newly promoted Scottish League Two club Edinburgh City. After five years with Edinburgh, Antell moved to Arbroath in June 2021.

== International career ==
Antell has represented Wales at under-19 youth level.
