= Paul Currie (footballer) =

Scottish footballer

Personal information
- Date of birth: 30 January 1985 (age 41)
- Place of birth: Edinburgh, Scotland
- Position: Midfielder

Youth career
- Musselburgh Windsor
- Leith Athletic
- Cowdenbeath

Senior career*
Years	Team	Apps	(Gls)
2006–2007	Raith Rovers	8	(0)
2007–2009	Musselburgh Athletic		
2009–2011	Berwick Rangers	68	(22)
2011–2012	Hamilton Academical	9	(2)
2012	Musselburgh Athletic		
2012–2013	Arbroath	17	(4)
2013–2014	Bonnyrigg Rose Athletic		
2014–2015	Berwick Rangers	12	(4)
2015–2018	Kelty Hearts		
- * Club domestic league appearances and goals

Paul Currie (born 30 January 1985) is a Scottish former footballer.

== Career ==
Currie began his youth football career with Musselburgh Windsor from their colts team through to Under 13's, winning Player of the Year, from there he joined Leith Athletic at under-15 level before joining the youth system at Cowdenbeath. After a spell at his hometown club Musselburgh Athletic, Currie had a season with Scottish Second Division side Raith Rovers before returning to Musselburgh.

=== Berwick Rangers ===
Currie joined Berwick Rangers in 2009, making his debut on 19 September against Elgin City scoring Berwick's second goal in their 3–3 draw. In all he made 75 appearances in all competitions scoring 23 goals for the club.

=== Hamilton ===
On 31 August 2011 Currie signed for Hamilton Academical after the second of two offers was accepted by Berwick. He made his debut on 10 September against Queen of the South at Palmerston Park. His first goal for the club came on 15 October against Morton in their 2–0 win, going on to score from the spot against Ayr United on 29 October. He was released by Hamilton upon his request in January 2012, and as FIFA regulations allow a player to play for only two Senior clubs in a season, Currie returned to Musselburgh Athletic for a third spell until the summer.

=== Arbroath ===
Currie signed for Arbroath in June 2012 after joining the club for pre-season training. Despite being a first team regular at Gayfield, he left for Junior side Bonnyrigg Rose Athletic in February 2013, signing an 18-month contract.

== Career statistics ==
As of 11 February 2013

Club statistics
Club	Season	League		Scottish Cup		League Cup		Other		Total	
Club	Season	App	Goals	App	Goals	App	Goals	App	Goals	App	Goals
Raith Rovers	2006–07	7	0	1	0	0	0	0	0	8	0
Berwick Rangers	2009–10	31	5	0	0	1	0	1	0	33	5
Berwick Rangers	2010–11	33	14	1	0	0	0	0	0	34	14
Berwick Rangers	2011–12	4	3	0	0	2	1	2	0	8	4
Hamilton Academical	2011–12	9	2	1	0	0	0	0	0	10	2
Arbroath	2012–13	17	4	2	0	1	0	4	2	24	6
Total		101	28	5	0	4	1	7	2	117	31
