= Stephen McNally (footballer) =

Scottish footballer

Personal information
- Full name: Stephen McNally
- Date of birth: 15 March 1984 (age 42)
- Place of birth: Dundee, Scotland
- Position: Defender

Youth career
- –2003: Dundee Downfield
- 2003–2004: Dundee

Senior career*
Years	Team	Apps	(Gls)
2004–2006	Dundee	28	(0)
2006–2007	Peterhead	4	(0)
2007–2010	Forfar Athletic	64	(2)
2010	→ Montrose (loan)	19	(1)
2010–2014	Montrose	64	(2)
- * Club domestic league appearances and goals as of 12 Jun 2014

Stephen McNally (born 15 March 1984) is a Scottish footballer currently without a club.
