= Ian McCaldon =

English-born Scottish footballer (born 1974)

Personal information
- Full name: Ian McCaldon
- Date of birth: 14 September 1974 (age 52)
- Place of birth: Liverpool, England
- Position: Goalkeeper

Senior career*
Years	Team	Apps	(Gls)
1996–2001	Livingston	79	(0)
2000–2001	→ St Mirren (loan)	5	(0)
2001–2003	Oxford United	28	(0)
2002	→ Chester City (loan)	2	(0)
2003–2004	Chester City	13	(0)
2005–2006	Ross County	10	(0)
2007	Peterhead	14	(0)
2010–2013	Berwick Rangers	18	(0)
Total		169	(0)
- * Club domestic league appearances and goals as of 26 August 2012

Ian McCaldon (born 14 September 1974) is a Scottish former football goalkeeper. McCaldon serves as the head goalkeeping coach for Everton Women in Liverpool, England. He oversees scouting, training and game plans for the Everton goalkeepers.

While a player at Livingston McCaldon helped them reach the semi-finals of the 2000-01 Scottish Cup. When the game came round McCaldon had picked up an injury and Livingston were trying to sign a senior goalkeeper on emergency cover because Javier Sánchez Broto was cup-tied, Neil Alexander was injured and David McEwan was not deemed ready for first team football. However Livi were unable to sign anyone so McCaldon was forced to play with his injury, and they ended up losing 3-0 to Hibernian.

From 2018 to 2020, McCaldon was the head goalkeeping coach for Washington Spirit in the National Women's Soccer League. While there he was named 2020 Coach of the Year and marshaled goalkeeper Aubrey Bledsoe to train with the United States Women's National Team.

McCaldon was the head goalkeeping coach for the Scottish Women's National A Squad, where he traveled extensively, including 77 international games in Europe, the United States, and Brazil. In 2017, McCaldon helped lead the team to the Women's European Championship Finals.

Prior to that, McCaldon coached goalkeepers at Livingston Football Club, National Performance Center for Female Footballers at Herriott Watt University Edinburgh, and Hibernian Ladies Football Club.

McCaldon played as a professional goalkeeper for twelve years at Livingston FC, St Mirren, Ross County FC, Peterhead FC, Berwick Rangers FC, Oxford United FC, and Chester City FC.

He has his SFA Goalkeeping License, UEFA 'B' License, is a certified professional trainer and private goalkeeping coach for emerging talent aiming to make college, club or pro teams.
