= Chris Townsley =

Scottish footballer

Personal information
- Full name: Christopher James Townsley
- Date of birth: 4 March 1985 (age 41)
- Place of birth: Edinburgh, Scotland
- Position: Defender

Youth career
- Hearts
- Ross County

Senior career*
Years	Team	Apps	(Gls)
2004–2006	Ross County	0	(0)
2004–2005	→ Alloa (loan)	42	(3)
2006–2010	Alloa	122	(5)
2010–2011	Spartans		
2011–2013	Berwick Rangers	58	(0)
2013–2016	East Stirlingshire	84	(6)
2016–2017	Spartans		
2017–2022	Broxburn Athletic		

Managerial career
- 2020–2022: Broxburn Athletic (player-manager)
- * Club domestic league appearances and goals

Chris Townsley (born 4 March 1985) is a Scottish retired professional footballer who plays as a defender. He is now an SFA referee.

== Club career ==
Townsley began his career in the youth academy of Hearts before signing his first professional contract with Ross County in 2004. He joined Alloa on loan for the 2004–2005 season before signing for the Wasps permanently in 2006.

After 164 league appearances for the Wasps, he departed the club to sign for Spartans in 2010. After just a season at the club, he was on the move again and signed for Berwick Rangers in 2011. Townsley made 58 league appearances over two seasons for the Borderers.

Following his departure from Shielfield Park, the defender signed for East Stirlingshire in 2013 where he made 84 league appearances, scoring 6 goals.

Townsley returned to Spartans for the 2016–2017 season, but was soon the move again. In 2017, he signed for Broxburn Athletic, before becoming player-manager in 2020.

He resigned from the position and left the club in December 2022 following a 5–1 defeat to Linlithgow Rose.
