= Paul McMullan (footballer, born 1984) =

Scottish footballer

Personal information
- Full name: Paul Alexander McMullan
- Date of birth: 13 March 1984 (age 42)
- Place of birth: Bellshill, Scotland
- Position: Midfielder

Senior career*
Years	Team	Apps	(Gls)
2001–2004	Heart of Midlothian	19	(1)
2003–2004	→ Queen of the South (loan)	11	(0)
2004–2005	Inverness Caledonian Thistle	0	(0)
2005	Raith Rovers	10	(1)
2005–2006	Sorrento		
2006	Hamilton Academical	14	(1)
2006–2007	Stranraer	23	(2)
2007–2008	Berwick Rangers	23	(0)
2008–2009	Glenafton Athletic		
2009–2011	Berwick Rangers	35	(1)
2011	Clyde	5	(0)
2012–2014	Elgin City	69	(1)
2014–2015	East Stirlingshire	1	(0)
- * Club domestic league appearances and goals

Paul Alexander McMullan (born 13 March 1984) is a Scottish former professional football midfielder. He has previously played in the Scottish Premier League for Heart of Midlothian.

== Career ==
McMullan started his career at Heart of Midlothian, making his senior début on 16 February 2002, in a match away to Kilmarnock. During his four-year spell at Hearts, he went on to play a role in the club's 2002–03 season, when the club finished third in the Scottish Premier League. McMullan played in two Edinburgh derby matches that season, including a game that Hearts won 5–1 at Tynecastle in August 2002. McMullan left on a loan period to Queen of the South in December 2003, before leaving Hearts in the summer of 2004.

After joining Inverness Caledonian Thistle, McMullan moved to Raith Rovers in January 2005, without making a league appearance for the Highland club. McMullan then had an eight-month spell in Australia with Sorrento FC in the Western Australia State League, before returning to Scotland in January 2006, to play for Hamilton Academical. The player later moved on to Stranraer and Berwick Rangers and had a season at junior level with Glenafton Athletic where he reunited with his former manager at Raith, Gordon Dalziel.

McMullan signed for Clyde in January 2011, before moving to Elgin City in January 2012.

On 21 May 2014, McMullan signed for East Stirlingshire, but having only made three appearances for the club due to injury, his contract was cancelled by mutual consent in January 2015.
