= David Dunn (footballer, born 1981) =

Scottish footballer

Personal information
- Date of birth: 1 November 1981 (age 45)
- Place of birth: Bellshill, Scotland
- Height: 5 ft 11 in (1.80 m)
- Position: Midfielder

Team information
- Current team: Wishaw Juniors F.C.

Senior career*
Years	Team	Apps	(Gls)
1997–1999	Motherwell	0	(0)
1999–2002	Clyde	51	(0)
2002–2006	Airdrie United	92	(6)
2006–2008	Ayr United	49	(0)
2008–2011	East Stirlingshire	90	(9)
2011–2012	Larkhall Thistle	0	(0)
2012–2014	Linlithgow Rose		
2014	Sauchie Juniors		
2014–2015	Thorniewood United		
2015–2016	Newmains United		
2016	Lanark United		
2016	Cambuslang Rangers		
2016–	Forth Wanderers		
- * Club domestic league appearances and goals as of 19:08, 16 October 2016 (UTC)

David Hugh Dunn (born 1 November 1981), is a Scottish football midfielder who plays for Forth Wanderers in the Scottish Junior Football Association, West Region. He has previously played in the Scottish Football League First Division for Clyde and Airdrieonians.

== Career ==
Dunn had a twelve-year career in the Scottish Football League after leaving Motherwell in 1999 without making a first-team appearance.

He moved to Junior football in 2011 with Larkhall Thistle and has since played for Linlithgow Rose, Sauchie Juniors, Thorniewood United, Newmains United, Lanark United, Cambuslang Rangers and most recently Forth Wanderers whom he joined in October 2016.
