= Stuart Mills (footballer) =

Scottish footballer

Personal information
- Date of birth: 7 April 1990 (age 36)
- Place of birth: Glasgow, Scotland
- Position: Right winger

Team information
- Current team: Blantyre Victoria

Youth career
- Hamilton Academical

Senior career*
Years	Team	Apps	(Gls)
2009–2010	Hamilton Academical	3	(0)
2010	Kirkintilloch Rob Roy		
2010–2011	Clyde	11	(2)
2011–2012	South Camlachie Juveniles		
2012–2013	Pollok		
2013–	Blantyre Victoria		
- * Club domestic league appearances and goals as of 10:50, 15 July 2013 (UTC)

Stuart Mills (born 7 April 1990) is a Scottish professional footballer who plays, as a right winger, for Blantyre Victoria in the Scottish Junior Football Association, West Region. He has previously played in the Scottish Premier League for Hamilton Academical.

== Career ==
Born in Glasgow, Mills began his career at Hamilton Academical, making his professional debut on 4 April 2009, against Celtic, in the Scottish Premier League. He made two more appearances for the Accies, before leaving the club to sign for junior side Kirkintilloch Rob Roy.

In June 2010, he returned to the senior game, joining Clyde. He only stayed with Clyde for a year, being released at the end of the season, after making 14 appearances in all competitions, scoring 2 goals.

Mills later returned to youth football with South Camlachie Juveniles before signing for Junior side Pollok in July 2012. He moved on to Blantyre Victoria in the summer of 2013. While playing with Blantyre Victoria he suffered a potentially career-ending injury in March 2014, and a benefit match to raise funds for him was organized.
