= Fraser McLaren =

Scottish footballer

Personal information
- Date of birth: 26 September 1988 (age 38)
- Position: Striker

Team information
- Current team: Dunbar United
- Number: 9

Senior career*
Years	Team	Apps	(Gls)
2007–2008	Gretna	3	(0)
2007	→ Ayr United (loan)	5	(1)
2008	→ Montrose (loan)	3	(0)
2008–2013	Berwick Rangers	138	(31)
2013–2015	Peterhead	34	(5)
2015	→ Bonnyrigg Rose (loan)		
2015–2016	Bonnyrigg Rose		
2016–	Dunbar United		

International career^{‡}
2006–2008	Scotland U19	6	(4)
- * Club domestic league appearances and goals as of 22:30, 12 November 2020 (UTC) ‡ National team caps and goals as of 00:46, 7 March 2014 (UTC)

Fraser McLaren (born 26 September 1988) is a Scottish footballer, who plays for East of Scotland League Premier Division club Dunbar United. He has previously played for Gretna, Ayr United, Montrose, Berwick Rangers, Peterhead and Bonnyrigg Rose.

== Career ==
McLaren started his senior career with Gretna and made three appearances in the Scottish Premier League during the 2007–08 season. He also played on loan for Ayr United in 2007 and Montrose in 2008. He was released by Gretna in March 2008, after the club entered administration.

McLaren then signed for Berwick Rangers. McLaren made over 100 league appearances for Berwick. He scored an equalising goal in a 1–1 draw against Rangers on 26 August 2012. On 28 June 2013, he left Berwick after turning down a new contract.

On 11 August 2013, McLaren signed for Peterhead. In March 2015, McLaren moved on loan to Junior club Bonnyrigg Rose until the end of the season. After two years with The Blue Toon, McLaren was released by the side at the end of the 2014–15 season.

Following his release by Peterhead, McLaren signed a permanent contract with Bonnyrigg Rose in summer 2015.

At the end of the 2015/16 season McLaren left Bonnyrigg Rose to join his hometown team Dunbar United F.C.

=== International ===
McLaren was selected by the Scotland under–21s and played six times for the Under–19s.
