= Paul Hay =

Scottish footballer

Personal information
- Date of birth: 14 November 1980 (age 45)
- Place of birth: Glasgow, Scotland
- Positions: Defender; midfielder

Team information
- Current team: Clyde

Senior career*
Years	Team	Apps	(Gls)
1997–2001	Clyde	27	(0)
2001–2008	Stirling Albion	220	(9)
2008–2011	East Stirlingshire	100	(1)
2011–2012	Clyde	29	(0)
- * Club domestic league appearances and goals as of 15:49, 25 July 2012 (UTC)

Paul Hay (born 14 November 1980) is a Scottish retired professional footballer who plays for Scottish Third Division side Clyde.

== Career ==
Hay joined Stirling Albion after a spell with Clyde. Hay made his debut for Clyde in February 1999 against Alloa Athletic in the Scottish Second Division. Hay played over 200 games (including cup games) for the Binos since his debut against Stranraer in March 2001. He scored his first goal for Stirling on 13 October 2001 against Peterhead.

At the end of the 2007-08 season, Hay was released by Stirling Albion. In June 2008 he signed for Scottish Third Division side East Stirlingshire. He stayed with the Shire for 3 years, before returning to his first club, Clyde, in June 2011. On 15 October 2011 he played in a 7–1 win against former team East Stirlingshire at Broadwood.
