= Jamie Winter =

Scottish footballer

Personal information
- Full name: Jamie Winter
- Date of birth: 4 August 1985 (age 41)
- Place of birth: Dundee, Scotland
- Position: Midfielder

Senior career*
Years	Team	Apps	(Gls)
2003–2005	Leeds United	0	(0)
2005–2007	Aberdeen	19	(1)
2006	→ St Johnstone (loan)	8	(0)
2007–2009	Chesterfield	47	(2)
2009–2010	Formartine United	4	(0)
2010–2011	Broughty Athletic	0	(0)
2011–2013	Montrose	31	(9)
2013–2018	Broughty Athletic		
2018–	Carnoustie Panmure		
- * Club domestic league appearances and goals as of 20:08, 14 April 2012 (UTC)

Jamie Winter (born 4 August 1985) is a Scottish footballer.

== Career ==
He started his career with Leeds United, but failed to make an impact. He moved to Aberdeen at the end of 2005. He failed to make an impact, but scored a free kick against Celtic in a 3–1 defeat. He spent the second half of the 2005–06 season on loan to St Johnstone.

Winter was told that he would be leaving Aberdeen at the end of the 2006–07 season. He signed for Chesterfield on 20 July 2007, until the end of June 2009. At the end of the 2008–09 season, Chesterfield chose not to renew Winter's contract and he became a free agent. Winter then signed for Highland League club Formartine United, but his contract was terminated by mutual consent during the 2009–10 season.

On 7 August 2010, Winter signed for Dundee based junior club Broughty Athletic. Winter then signed for Montrose in 2011. On 22 August 2013, Winter returned to junior club Broughty Athletic. On 25 October 2018, Winter signed A New Contract with junior club Carnoustie Panmure.
