= John Neill (footballer) =

Scottish footballer

Personal information
- Date of birth: 17 August 1987 (age 39)
- Place of birth: Bellshill, Scotland
- Positions: Midfielder; forward

Team information
- Current team: Berwick Rangers

Youth career
- Hibernian

Senior career*
Years	Team	Apps	(Gls)
2003–2007	Heart of Midlothian	5	(0)
2006	→ Hamilton Academical (loan)	4	(2)
2007	→ Raith Rovers (loan)	18	(4)
2008–2010	Queen's Park	31	(7)
2010–2011	East Stirlingshire	33	(9)
2011–2014	Clyde	45	(18)
2017–2019	Berwick Rangers	26	(5)
- * Club domestic league appearances and goals as of 18:00, 19 February 2013

John Neill (born 17 August 1987) is a Scottish professional footballer.

== Career ==
A combative and creative central midfielder, Neill started his senior career with Hearts, whom he joined from rivals Hibernian's youth initiative. He was loaned to Hamilton Academical between August and November 2006, making his senior professional debut, and also scoring, against Gretna in the Scottish Challenge Cup. A second loan spell, this time with Raith Rovers in early 2007 under former Hearts coach John McGlynn, saw Neill make his first league appearances and he played in both legs of Rovers' defeat to Stirling Albion in the 2006–07 Scottish First Division play-offs.

Neill was released from his Hearts' contract on in August 2007 and joined Queen's Park in February 2008, becoming manager Gardner Spiers' first signing for the club. He then moved to East Stirlingshire before joining Clyde in July 2011. Neill was top goalscorer in his first season, earning a new one-year contract, but left in the summer of 2013.
