= 2010–11 Stranraer F.C. season =

Stranraer
2010–11 season
- Chairman: Alex Connor
- Manager: Keith Knox
- Stadium: Stair Park
- Third Division: Fifth place
- Challenge Cup: First round, lost to East Stirlingshire
- League Cup: First round, lost to Greenock Morton
- Scottish Cup: Fifth round, lost to Motherwell
- Top goalscorer: League: Armand Oné (17); All: Armand Oné (22); Craig Malcolm (22)
- Highest home attendance: 493 vs. Annan Athletic, 23 April 2011
- Lowest home attendance: 267 vs. Berwick Rangers, 11 December 2010
- Average home league attendance: 366

The 2010–11 season was Stranraer's second consecutive season in the Scottish Third Division, having been relegated from the Scottish Second Division at the end of the 2008–09 season. Stranraer also competed in the Challenge Cup, League Cup and the Scottish Cup.

== Summary ==
Stranraer finished fifth in the Third Division. They reached the first round of the Challenge Cup, the first round of the League Cup, and the fifth round of the Scottish Cup.

== Results and fixtures ==
Win Draw Loss

=== Scottish Third Division ===
7 August 2010 Scottish Third Division	Clyde	2 – 2	Stranraer	Broadwood
	Winter 10', 25'	BBC Report	Malcolm 43'; Winter 64'	Attendance: 827; Referee: Beaton

14 August 2010 Scottish Third Division	Stranraer	3 – 2	Albion Rovers	Stair Park
	Agnew 71'; Malcolm 84'; One 87'	BBC Report	McLeod 45'; Smith 77'	Attendance: 312; Referee: Law

21 August 2010 Scottish Third Division	Annan Athletic	2 – 2	Stranraer	Galabank
	Harty 13'; Halsman 67'	BBC Report	Malcolm 3'; Bouadji 7'	Attendance: 671; Referee: Robertson

28 August 2010 Scottish Third Division	Elgin City	1 – 2	Stranraer	Borough Briggs
	Millar 90'	BBC Report	Bouadji 34'; Malcolm 70'	Attendance: 370; Referee: Robertson

11 September 2010 Scottish Third Division	Stranraer	1 – 0	Queen's Park	Stair Park
	Nicoll (yellow card) 75' (red card); Malcolm 93'	BBC Report	Watt (red card) 89'	Attendance: 408; Referee: Nicholls

18 September 2010 Scottish Third Division	Berwick Rangers	2 – 2	Stranraer	Shielfield Park
	Gribben 28'; Brazil 88'; Notman (red card) 54'	BBC Report	Agnew 56' (Penalty); Winter 65'	Attendance: 489; Referee: Robertson

25 September 2010 Scottish Third Division	Stranraer	4 – 1	Arbroath	Stair Park
	Agnew 15', 59'; Winter 75'; One 89'	BBC Report	Doris 71'; Shields (red card) 38'	Attendance: 379; Referee: Hilland

2 October 2010 Scottish Third Division	Stranraer	1 – 2	Montrose	Stair Park
	One 44'	BBC Report	Thompson 16', 25'	Attendance: 352; Referee: Charleston

9 October 2010 Scottish Third Division	Montrose	3 – 3	Stranraer	Links Park
	Tosh 52'; McCord 65'; McNalley 76'	BBC Report	Winter 8'; Malcolm 33', 49'	Attendance: 335; Referee: Colvin

16 October 2010 Scottish Third Division	East Stirlingshire	0 – 1	Stranraer	Ochilview Park
15:00		Report	Oné 1'	Attendance: 317; Referee: Watters

30 October 2010 Scottish Third Division	Stranraer	2 – 1	Elgin City	Stair Park
	One 33'; Agnew 82' (Penalty)	ESPN Report	Crooks (7Penalty); Niven (red card) 92'	Attendance: 367; Referee: Smith

6 November 2010 Scottish Third Division	Queen's Park	1 – 3	Stranraer	Hampden Park
	Harkins 18'; Brough (red card) 88'; McBride (red card) 89'	BBC Report	One 74'; Moore 77'; Gallacher 83'	Attendance: 636; Referee: Robertson

13 November 2010 Scottish Third Division	Stranraer	2 – 2	Annan Athletic	Stair Park
	Winter 76'; Moore 82'	BBC Report	O'Connor 45'; Harty 48'	Attendance: 463; Referee: Roache

11 December 2010 Scottish Third Division	Stranraer	1 – 1	Berwick Rangers	Stair Park
	Malcolm 86'	BBC Report	Brazil 2'	Attendance: 267; Referee: Madden

15 December 2010 Scottish Third Division	Arbroath	0 – 0	Stranraer	Gayfield Park
		BBC Report		Attendance: 302; Referee: Watters

15 January 2011 Scottish Third Division	Stranraer	2 – 1	Queen's Park	Stair Park
	Agnew 27'; Malcolm 81'	BBC Report	Gallagher 70'	Attendance: 341; Referee: Clancy

22 January 2011 Scottish Third Division	Elgin City	2 – 1	Stranraer	Borough Briggs
	Gallagher 52' (Own goal); Gunn 64'	BBC Report	Moore 19'	Attendance: 714; Referee: Roache

29 January 2011 Scottish Third Division	Stranraer	3 – 4	Arbroath	Stair Park
	Agnew 14'; One 50'; Glen Mitchell 91'	BBC Report	Swankie 26', 56', 65'; Falkingham 38'; Chisholm (red card) 67'; Falkingham (yellow card) 92' (red card)	Attendance: 441; Referee: Charleston

12 February 2011 Scottish Third Division	Stranraer	2 – 2	Montrose	Stair Park
	Malcolm 12'; Winter 74'	BBC Report	Thompson 7'; Nicol 71'	Attendance: 320; Referee: Aitken

15 February 2011 Scottish Third Division	Albion Rovers	1 – 2	Stranraer	Cliftonhill
	Innes 72'; Innes (red card) 79'	BBC Report	Malcolm 28'; One 93'	Attendance: 326; Referee: Hilland

19 February 2011 Scottish Third Division	East Stirlingshire	0 – 2	Stranraer	Ochilview Park
15:00		Report	Agnew 42'; Oné 81'	Attendance: 294; Referee: Northcroft

23 February 2011 Scottish Third Division	Stranraer	4 – 1	East Stirlingshire	Stair Park
19:45	Agnew 6'; Oné 34', 37', 67'	Report	Maguire 15'	Attendance: 269; Referee: Beaton

26 February 2011 Scottish Third Division	Clyde	4 – 2	Stranraer	Broadwood
	McCusker 11', 55' (Penalty); Scuillion 67'; Waddell 83'	BBC Report	Malcolm 6'; One 64'; Murphy (red card) 54'	Attendance: 703; Referee: Robertson

1 March 2011 Scottish Third Division	Stranraer	3 – 1	Clyde	Stair Park
	One 43', 81'; Malcolm 66'	BBC Report	Stewart 49'	Attendance: 307; Referee: Law

5 March 2011 Scottish Third Division	Stranraer	1 – 3	Albion Rovers	Stair Park
	Agnew 11'	BBC Report	Love 63'; Donnelly 67'; Smith 88'	Attendance: 390; Referee: Somers

8 March 2011 Scottish Third Division	Annan Athletic	2 – 1	Stranraer	Galabank
	O'Connor 26'; Harty 41'	BBC Report	Murphy 25'; Moore (red card) 29'	Attendance: 307; Referee: Muir

12 March 2011 Scottish Third Division	Queen's Park	3 – 3	Stranraer	Hampden Park
	McBride 41'; Little 81'; Longworth 88'	ESPN Report	Nicoll 13'; Malcolm 46'; One 58'	Attendance: 607; Referee: Nicholls

19 March 2011 Scottish Third Division	Stranraer	1 – 2	Elgin City	Stair Park
	Murphy 86'; Malcolm (red card) 94'	BBC Report	Duff 21'; Gormley 64'; Kaczan (red card) 95'	Attendance: 339; Referee: Robertson

26 March 2011 Scottish Third Division	Arbroath	2 – 2	Stranraer	Gayfield Park
	Gallacher 67' (Own goal); Hill (red card) 70'; Swankie 82'	BBC Report	Agnew 72'; One 72'	Attendance: 701; Referee: Aitken

29 March 2011 Scottish Third Division	Berwick Rangers	3 – 3	Stranraer	Shielfield Park
	McLeod 9'; Gribben 40'; Gray 77'	BBC Report	Murphy 4'; Agnew 45+2', 90'	Attendance: 297; Referee: Charleston

2 April 2011 Scottish Third Division	Stranraer	3 – 1	Berwick Rangers	Stair Park
	McColm 40', 67'; Gallacher 52'	BBC Report	Currie 56'	Attendance: 331; Referee: Clancy

9 April 2011 Scottish Third Division	Stranraer	2 – 0	East Stirlingshire	Stair Park
15:00	Kennedy 35'; Winter 50'	Report		Attendance: 373; Referee: Roache

16 April 2011 Scottish Third Division	Montrose	3 – 2	Stranraer	Links Park
	Nicol 12' (Penalty), 64'; Cameron 14'	BBC Report	McColm 54'; Gallacher 73'	Attendance: 316; Referee: Beaton

23 April 2011 Scottish Third Division	Stranraer	1 – 1	Annan Athletic	Stair Park
	Winter 7'	BBC Report	Harty 59'	Attendance: 493; Referee: Richmond

30 April 2011 Scottish Third Division	Albion Rovers	1 – 0	Stranraer	Cliftonhill
	Chaplain 58'	BBC Report		Attendance: 421; Referee: Law

7 May 2011 Scottish Third Division	Stranraer	3 – 0	Clyde	Stair Park
	Malcolm 17'; Noble 72'; McColm 87'	BBC Report		Attendance: 439; Referee: Robertson

=== Scottish Challenge Cup ===
24 July 2010 Scottish Challenge Cup round 1	Stranraer	1 – 2 (a.e.t.)	East Stirlingshire	Stair Park
	McColm 78'	SFL Report	Cawley 51'; Richardson 117'	Attendance: 269; Referee: Eddie Smith

=== Scottish League Cup ===
31 July 2010 Scottish League Cup round 1	Stranraer	1 – 7	Greenock Morton	Stair Park
	McColm 55'	BBC Report	Kean 27', 50'; Holmes 31'; Monti 54'; Weatherson 71', 76'; Kelbie 83'	Attendance: 470; Referee: Nicholls

=== Scottish Cup ===
23 October 2010 Scottish Cup round 2	Stranraer	9 – 0	St Cuthbert Wanderers	Stair Park
	Agnew 12'; One 15', 18', 65'; Malcolm 67', 74', 78'; Winter 82'; Moore 88'	ESPN Report		Attendance: 401; Referee: Clancy

20 November 2010 Scottish Cup round 3	Stranraer	4 – 2	Girvan	Stair Park
	Agnew 34' (Penalty); Malcolm 42', 80'; Gallagher 48'	BBC Report	Moffat 6'; Connell 55'	Attendance: 840; Referee: Sinnie

18 January 2011 Scottish Cup round 4	Stenhousemuir	0 – 0	Stranraer	Ochilview Park
		BBC Report		Attendance: 405; Referee: Somers

25 January 2011 Scottish Cup round 4 replay	Stranraer	4 – 3	Stenhousemuir	Stair Park
	One 19', 74'; Malcolm 44'; Murphy 49'	BBC Report	Dalziel 17'; Gallagher 45+2'; Clark 90'	Attendance: 521; Referee: Somers

5 February 2011 Scottish Cup round 5	Stranraer	0 – 2	Motherwell	Stair Park
		BBC Report	Jones 45+1'; Sutton 82'	Attendance: 2,042; Referee: Richmond

== Player statistics ==
=== Squad ===
No.	Pos	Nat	Player	Total		Third Division		Challenge Cup		League Cup		Scottish Cup	
No.	Pos	Nat	Player	Apps	Goals	Apps	Goals	Apps	Goals	Apps	Goals	Apps	Goals
	GK	(Scotland) SCO	Ryan Marshall	5	0	4+0	0	0+0	0	1+0	0	0+0	0
	GK	(Scotland) SCO	David Mitchell	38	0	32+0	0	1+0	0	0+0	0	5+0	0
	DF	(France) FRA	Romauld Bouadji	6	2	4+0	2	1+0	0	1+0	0	0+0	0
	DF	(Scotland) SCO	Grant Gallagher	42	0	35+0	0	1+0	0	1+0	0	5+0	0
	DF	(Scotland) SCO	Declan Gallagher	30	4	26+0	3	0+0	0	0+0	0	4+0	1
	DF	(Scotland) SCO	Ryan Kennedy	7	1	7+0	1	0+0	0	0+0	0	0+0	0
	DF	(Latvia) LAT	Antons Kurakins	20	0	18+1	0	0+0	0	0+0	0	1+0	0
	DF	(Scotland) SCO	David McAuliffe	9	0	5+1	0	1+0	0	0+1	0	1+0	0
	DF	(Scotland) SCO	Glen Mitchell	15	1	4+7	1	0+1	0	0+1	0	0+2	0
	DF	(Scotland) SCO	Paul Murphy	38	4	30+1	3	1+0	0	1+0	0	5+0	1
	DF	(Scotland) SCO	Kevin Nicoll	29	1	20+5	1	1+0	0	0+1	0	2+0	0
	DF	(Scotland) SCO	Lee Sharp	30	0	20+5	0	1+0	0	1+0	0	2+1	0
	MF	(Scotland) SCO	Scott Agnew	43	15	36+0	13	1+0	0	1+0	0	5+0	2
	MF	(Scotland) SCO	Stephen Aitken	1	0	0+1	0	0+0	0	0+0	0	0+0	0
	MF	(Scotland) SCO	Angus Cochrane	8	0	2+5	0	0+0	0	0+0	0	0+1	0
	MF	(Scotland) SCO	Paul McInnes	1	0	0+1	0	0+0	0	0+0	0	0+0	0
	MF	(Scotland) SCO	Danny Mitchell	39	0	24+8	0	1+0	0	1+0	0	5+0	0
	MF	(Scotland) SCO	Steven Noble	29	1	19+5	1	0+0	0	0+0	0	4+1	0
	MF	(Scotland) SCO	Sean Winter	33	9	23+5	8	0+0	0	1+0	0	4+0	1
	FW	(Scotland) SCO	Craig Malcolm	40	22	34+0	15	1+0	1	0+0	0	5+0	6
	FW	(Scotland) SCO	Stuart McColm	42	5	18+17	4	0+1	0	1+0	1	1+4	0
	FW	(Scotland) SCO	Michael Moore	34	4	11+17	3	0+1	0	1+0	0	2+2	1
	FW	(France) FRA	Armand Oné	42	22	24+11	17	1+0	0	1+0	0	4+1	5

== League table ==
Pos	Team	Pld	W	D	L	GF	GA	GD	Pts	Promotion or qualification
3	Queen's Park	36	18	5	13	57	43	+14	59	Qualification for the Second Division Play-offs
4	Annan Athletic	36	16	11	9	58	45	+13	59	Qualification for the Second Division Play-offs
5	Stranraer	36	15	12	9	72	57	+15	57	
6	Berwick Rangers	36	12	13	11	62	56	+6	49	
7	Elgin City	36	13	6	17	53	63	−10	45	

Source: SPFL
Rules for classification: 1) points; 2) goal difference; 3) number of goals scored.
