= 2010–11 Montrose F.C. season =

Montrose
2010–11 season
- Chairman: Derek Sim
- Manager: Steven Tweed; Ray Farningham
- Stadium: Links Park
- Third Division: Eighth place
- Challenge Cup: First round, lost to Peterhead
- League Cup: First round, lost to Dundee
- Scottish Cup: Fourth round, lost to Dunfermline Athletic
- Top goalscorer: League: Paul Tosh (12); All: Paul Tosh (18)
- Highest home attendance: 1,034 vs. Arbroath, 2 January 2011
- Lowest home attendance: 235 vs. Albion Rovers, 12 March 2011
- Average home league attendance: 393

The 2010–11 season was Montrose’s fifth consecutive season in the Scottish Third Division, having been relegated from the Scottish Second Division at the end of the 1995–96 season. Montrose also competed in the Challenge Cup, League Cup and the Scottish Cup.

== Summary ==
Montrose finished Eighth in the Third Division. They reached the first round of the Challenge Cup, the first round of the League Cup, and the fourth round of the Scottish Cup.

=== Management ===
The club were managed during season 2010–11 by Steven Tweed. On 21 March 2011, Tweed resigned for personal reasons, with Ray Farningham being appointed as interim manager. Farningham was appointed as permanent manager in April.

== Results and fixtures ==
Win Draw Loss

=== Third Division ===
7 August 2010 Scottish Third Division	Montrose	1 – 2	Queen's Park	Links Park
	Sinclair 75'	BBC Report	Smith 12'; McBride 93' (Penalty)	Attendance: 415; Referee: Salmond

14 August 2010 Scottish Third Division	East Stirlingshire	2 – 1	Montrose	Ochilview Park
15:00	Maguire 76' (pen.); Stevenson 88'	Report	Tosh 25'; Nicoll (red card) 90'	Attendance: 332; Referee: Brian Colvin

21 August 2010 Scottish Third Division	Montrose	3 – 0	Arbroath	Links Park
	Campbell 8'; Hegarty 22'; Tosh 32'	SFL Report		Attendance: 565; Referee: Clancy

28 August 2010 Scottish Third Division	Montrose	1 – 1	Annan Athletic	Links Park
	Tosh 16' (Penalty)	SFL Report	Gilfillan 66'	Attendance: 332; Referee: Somers

11 September 2010 Scottish Third Division	Albion Rovers	3 – 1	Montrose	Cliftonhill
	Stevenson 17' (Penalty); Love 23'; Gemmell 81'	BBC Report	Sinclair 88'	Attendance: 337; Referee: Smith

18 September 2010 Scottish Third Division	Elgin City	3 – 2	Montrose	Borough Briggs
	Wilson 33'; Gunn 52'; Crooks 73'	BBC Report	McCord 6'; Sinclair 76'	Attendance: 386; Referee: Madden

25 September 2010 Scottish Third Division	Montrose	8 – 1	Clyde	Links Park
	Tosh 30' (Penalty), 61', 63'; McCord 39', 72'; Thompson 56'; Boyle 70'; Watson 82'	BBC Report	Girvan (red card) 27'; McMillan (red card) 29'; Lithgow 80'	Attendance: 424; Referee: Roache

2 October 2010 Scottish Third Division	Stranraer	1 – 2	Montrose	Stair Park
	One 44'	BBC Report	Thompson 16', 25'	Attendance: 352; Referee: Charleston

9 October 2010 Scottish Third Division	Montrose	3 – 3	Stranraer	Links Park
	Tosh 52'; McCord 65'; McNalley 76'	BBC Report	Winter 8'; Malcolm 33', 49'	Attendance: 335; Referee: Colvin

16 October 2010 Scottish Third Division	Montrose	1 – 1	Berwick Rangers	Links Park
	Tosh 80' (Penalty)	BBC Report	Gribben 25'	Attendance: 376; Referee: Robertson

6 November 2010 Scottish Third Division	Montrose	0 – 2	Albion Rovers	Links Park
		BBC Report	Gemmell 32'; Love 37'	Attendance: 401; Referee: Madden

9 November 2010 Scottish Third Division	Annan Athletic	2 – 2	Montrose	Galabank
	Cox 25'; Muirhead 43'	BBC Report	Campbell 41'; Tosh 60'	Attendance: 377; Referee: Hilland

13 November 2010 Scottish Third Division	Arbroath	4 – 0	Montrose	Gayfield Park
	Doris 21' (Penalty), 62', 66'; Sheerin 71'	BBC Report		Attendance: 738; Referee: Salmond

11 December 2010 Scottish Third Division	Montrose	0 – 1	Elgin City	Links Park
		BBC Report	Gunn 53'	Attendance: 307; Referee: Robertson

2 January 2011 Scottish Third Division	Montrose	0 – 5	Arbroath	Links Park
	Hegarty (red card) 42'; Pope (yellow card) 55' (red card)	BBC Report	Falkingham 34', 51'; Swankie 40', 66'; Doris 92' (Penalty)	Attendance: 1,034; Referee: Roache

15 January 2011 Scottish Third Division	Albion Rovers	0 – 2	Montrose	Cliftonhill
		BBC Report	Smith 34'; Cameron 54'	Attendance: 312; Referee: Madden

22 January 2011 Scottish Third Division	Montrose	0 – 1	Annan Athletic	Links Park
		BBC Report	Neilson 91'	Attendance: 335; Referee: Robertson

29 January 2011 Scottish Third Division	Montrose	3 – 1	Clyde	Links Park
	Tosh 46' (Penalty); Crighton 56'; Boyle 81'	BBC Report	McCusker 45+2'	Attendance: 422; Referee: McDermott

5 February 2011 Scottish Third Division	Elgin City	1 – 0	Montrose	Borough Briggs
	Frizzel 24'	BBC Report		Attendance: 633; Referee: Anderson

12 February 2011 Scottish Third Division	Stranraer	2 – 2	Montrose	Stair Park
	Malcolm 12'; Winter 74'	BBC Report	Thompson 7'; Nicol 71'	Attendance: 320; Referee: Aitken

19 February 2011 Scottish Third Division	Montrose	1 – 1	Berwick Rangers	Links Park
	Tosh 62' (Penalty)	BBC Report	O'Reilly 69'	Attendance: 301; Referee: Smith

22 February 2011 Scottish Third Division	Berwick Rangers	1 – 0	Montrose	Shielfield Park
	Currie 89'	SFL Report		Attendance: 285; Referee: Hilland

26 February 2011 Scottish Third Division	Montrose	0 – 2	Queen's Park	Links Park
		BBC Report	Meggatt 36'; McGinn 86'	Attendance: 414; Referee: Northcroft

5 March 2011 Scottish Third Division	East Stirlingshire	1 – 2	Montrose	Ochilview Park
15:00	Weaver 8'	Report	Boyle 46'; Smith 59'	Attendance: 306; Referee: Clancy

12 March 2011 Scottish Third Division	Montrose	0 – 2	Albion Rovers	Links Park
		BBC Report	Gemmell 7'; Chaplain 76'	Attendance: 235; Referee: Roache

19 March 2011 Scottish Third Division	Annan Athletic	2 – 1	Montrose	Galabank
	Harty 46', 52' (Penalty)	SFL Report	Tosh 21'; Campbell (red card) 50'	Attendance: 473; Referee: Law

22 March 2011 Scottish Third Division	Montrose	0 – 2	East Stirlingshire	Links Park
19:45		Report	Neill 44'; Team 90+2'	Attendance: 259; Referee: Charleston

26 March 2011 Scottish Third Division	Clyde	2 – 0	Montrose	Broadwood
	Stewart 20'; Sawyers 81'	BBC Report		Attendance: 725; Referee: Anderson

29 March 2011 Scottish Third Division	Queen's Park	1 – 0	Montrose	Hampden Park
	Lauchlan 80'	BBC Report		Attendance: 325; Referee: Clancy

2 April 2011 Scottish Third Division	Montrose	1 – 0	Elgin City	Links Park
	Crawford 12'	BBC Report		Attendance: 256; Referee: McKendrick

5 April 2011 Scottish Third Division	Clyde	1 – 1	Montrose	Broadwood
	Brown (red card) 58'; Scuillion 85'	BBC Report	Thompson 86'	Attendance: 516; Referee: Somers

9 April 2011 Scottish Third Division	Berwick Rangers	0 – 1	Montrose	Shielfield Park
		BBC Report	Masson 80'	Attendance: 353; Referee: Robertson

16 April 2011 Scottish Third Division	Montrose	3 – 2	Stranraer	Links Park
	Nicol 12' (Penalty), 64'; Cameron 14'	BBC Report	McColm 54'; Gallacher 73'	Attendance: 316; Referee: Beaton

23 April 2011 Scottish Third Division	Arbroath	4 – 1	Montrose	Gayfield Park
	Doris 5' (Penalty); Falkingham 44'; Sheerin 61'; Strachan 90'	ESPN Report	Masson 70'	Attendance: 1,243; Referee: Finnie

30 April 2011 Scottish Third Division	Montrose	3 – 0	East Stirlingshire	Links Park
15:00	Pierce 8', 17'; Nicoll 11' (pen.)	Report		Attendance: 361; Referee: McDermott

7 May 2011 Scottish Third Division	Queen's Park	4 – 1	Montrose	Hampden Park
	Longworth 27', 59', 83'; Watt 77'	BBC Report	Masson 86'	Attendance: 767; Referee: Anderson

=== Scottish Challenge Cup ===
24 July 2010 Scottish Challenge Cup round 1	Peterhead	5 – 0	Montrose	Balmoor
	Wyness 7', 56'; McNalley 50' (o.g.); Emslie 66'; Bavidge 76'	SFL Report		Attendance: 357; Referee: Beaton

=== Scottish League Cup ===
31 July 2010 Scottish League Cup round 1	Dundee	3 – 0	Montrose	Dens Park
	Riley 33', 79'; Griffiths 70' (pen.)	SFL Report		Attendance: 2,111; Referee: Northcroft

=== Scottish Cup ===
23 October 2010 Scottish Cup round 2	Montrose	1 – 1	Arbroath	Links Park
	Sinclair 31'	ESPN Report	Doris 57'; Falkingham (yellow card) 67' (red card)	Attendance: 994; Referee: Madden

30 October 2010 Scottish Cup round 2 Replay	Arbroath	2 – 3 (a.e.t.)	Montrose	Gayfield Park
	Alan Rattray 47', 51'; Malcolm (yellow card) 92' (red card)	ESPN Report	Hegarty 7'; McCord 22'; Boyle 114'; Boyle (red card) 123'	Attendance: 838; Referee: Madden

20 November 2010 Scottish Cup round 3	Montrose	3 – 1	Whitehill Welfare	Links Park
	Tosh 21' (Penalty), 40' (Penalty); Pope 75'	BBC Report	Hall 7'; Cornett (yellow card) 38' (red card)	Attendance: 435; Referee: Northcroft

8 January 2011 Scottish Cup round 4	Montrose	2 – 2	Dunfermline Athletic	Links Park
	Tosh 27', 90'	BBC Report	Clarke 73'; Kirk 81'	Attendance: 1,030; Referee: Allan

18 January 2011 Scottish Cup round 4 Replay	Dunfermline Athletic	5 – 3	Montrose	East End Park
	Kirk 11'; McDougall 40'; Graham 48', 52'; Gibson 61' (pen.)	BBC Report	Woods 47' (o.g.); Tosh 72', 88' (pen.)	Attendance: 1,541; Referee: Allan

== Player statistics ==
=== Squad ===
No.	Pos	Nat	Player	Total		Third Division		Challenge Cup		League Cup		Scottish Cup	
No.	Pos	Nat	Player	Apps	Goals	Apps	Goals	Apps	Goals	Apps	Goals	Apps	Goals
	GK	(Australia) AUS	Scott Bennett	9	0	8+0	0	1+0	0	0+0	0	0+0	0
	GK	(Scotland) SCO	Michael Fraser	1	0	1+0	0	0+0	0	0+0	0	0+0	0
	GK	(Italy) ITA	Daniele Giordano	6	0	3+0	0	0+0	0	0+0	0	3+0	0
	GK	(Argentina) ARG	Ramiro González	14	0	14+0	0	0+0	0	0+0	0	0+0	0
	GK	(Scotland) SCO	Sandy Wood	14	0	10+0	0	0+0	0	1+0	0	2+1	0
	DF	(Scotland) SCO	Kyle Benedictus	5	0	5+0	0	0+0	0	0+0	0	0+0	0
	DF	(Scotland) SCO	Dougie Cameron	29	2	26+0	2	0+0	0	0+0	0	3+0	0
	DF	(Scotland) SCO	Alan Campbell	37	2	31+0	2	1+0	0	1+0	0	4+0	0
	DF	(Scotland) SCO	Sean Crighton	40	1	31+2	1	1+0	0	1+0	0	3+2	0
	DF	(Scotland) SCO	Stephen McNally	38	1	30+1	1	1+0	0	1+0	0	5+0	0
	DF	(Scotland) SCO	Gordon Pope	28	1	21+1	0	1+0	0	0+0	0	5+0	1
	DF	(Scotland) SCO	Aaron Sinclair	41	4	31+4	3	0+0	0	1+0	0	5+0	1
	DF	(Scotland) SCO	Daniel Stuart	1	0	0+1	0	0+0	0	0+0	0	0+0	0
	DF	(Scotland) SCO	Steven Tweed	9	0	6+0	0	0+0	0	1+0	0	2+0	0
	MF	(Scotland) SCO	Jonathan Crawford	20	1	18+1	1	0+0	0	0+0	0	1+0	0
	MF	(Scotland) SCO	Hugh Davidson	25	0	18+3	0	1+0	0	1+0	0	1+1	0
	MF	(Scotland) SCO	Sean Fleming	5	0	0+2	0	1+0	0	0+1	0	0+1	0
	MF	(Scotland) SCO	Chris Hegarty	28	2	18+6	1	1+0	0	0+0	0	2+1	1
	MF	(Scotland) SCO	Terry Masson	18	3	13+2	3	0+0	0	1+0	0	2+0	0
	MF	(Scotland) SCO	Ross McCord	39	5	28+5	4	0+0	0	0+1	0	5+0	1
	MF	(Scotland) SCO	Fraser Milligan	15	0	6+6	0	0+0	0	0+1	0	2+0	0
	MF	(Scotland) SCO	Nicky Smith	18	2	6+8	2	1+0	0	1+0	0	2+0	0
	MF	(Scotland) SCO	Paul Watson	11	1	2+6	1	0+0	0	0+0	0	0+3	0
	FW	(Scotland) SCO	Martin Boyle	28	4	9+14	3	0+0	0	0+0	0	1+4	1
	FW	(Scotland) SCO	James Collier	2	0	0+1	0	0+1	0	0+0	0	0+0	0
	FW	(Scotland) SCO	Simon Murray	1	0	0+1	0	0+0	0	0+0	0	0+0	0
	FW	(Scotland) SCO	Daryl Nicol	27	4	9+14	4	1+0	0	1+0	0	1+1	0
	FW	(Scotland) SCO	Sean Pierce	7	2	5+2	2	0+0	0	0+0	0	0+0	0
	FW	(Scotland) SCO	Connor Thompson	33	5	24+7	5	0+0	0	0+0	0	1+1	0
	FW	(Scotland) SCO	Paul Tosh	35	18	26+2	12	1+0	0	1+0	0	5+0	6

== League table ==
Pos	Team	Pld	W	D	L	GF	GA	GD	Pts
6	Berwick Rangers	36	12	13	11	62	56	+6	49
7	Elgin City	36	13	6	17	53	63	−10	45
8	Montrose	36	10	7	19	47	61	−14	37
9	East Stirlingshire	36	10	4	22	33	62	−29	34
10	Clyde	36	8	8	20	37	67	−30	32

Source: SPFL
Rules for classification: 1) points; 2) goal difference; 3) number of goals scored.
