= 2010–11 Arbroath F.C. season =

Arbroath
2010–11 season
- Chairman: John Christison
- Manager: Paul Sheerin
- Stadium: Gayfield Park
- Third Division: First place (champions)
- Challenge Cup: First round, lost to Dunfermline Athletic
- League Cup: First round, lost to Dunfermline Athletic
- Scottish Cup: Second round, lost to Montrose
- Top goalscorer: League: Gavin Swankie (22); All: Gavin Swankie (23)
- Highest home attendance: 1,243 vs. Montrose, 23 April 2011
- Lowest home attendance: 302 vs. Stranraer, 15 December 2010
- Average home league attendance: 588

The 2010–11 season was Arbroath's first season back in the Scottish Third Division, having been relegated from the Scottish Second Division at the end of the 2009–10 season. Arbroath also competed in the Challenge Cup, League Cup and the Scottish Cup.

== Summary ==
Arbroath finished first in the Third Division and were promoted to the Second Division. They reached the first round of the Challenge Cup, the first round of the League Cup, and the second round of the Scottish Cup.

=== Management ===
The club were managed during season 2010–11 by Paul Sheerin. Sheerin was appointed during pre season following the resignation of Jim Weir, who resigned following the club's relegation in order to join Brechin City.

== Results and fixtures ==
Win Draw Loss

=== Scottish Third Division ===
7 August 2010 Scottish Third Division	Elgin City	3 – 5	Arbroath	Borough Briggs
	Millar 52', 79'; Cameron 74'	BBC Sport	Gibson 16', 58'; McGowan 53'; Falkingham 71', 83'	Attendance: 518; Referee: Colvin

14 August 2010 Scottish Third Division	Arbroath	0 – 2	Annan Athletic	Gayfield Park
		BBC Report	Cox 38'; Neilson 40'	Attendance: 506; Referee: Clancy

21 August 2010 Scottish Third Division	Montrose	3 – 0	Arbroath	Links Park
	Campbell 8'; Hegarty 22'; Tosh 32'	SFL Report		Attendance: 565; Referee: Clancy

28 August 2010 Scottish Third Division	Arbroath	2 – 0	East Stirlingshire	Gayfield Park
15:00		Soccerway Report	Swankie 27'; McGowan 81'	Attendance: 499; Referee: Beaton

4 September 2010 Scottish Third Division	Arbroath	1 – 0	Queen's Park	Gayfield Park
	Swankie 77'	BBC Report		Attendance: 515; Referee: Charleston

11 September 2010 Scottish Third Division	Berwick Rangers	4 – 1	Arbroath	Shielfield Park
	O'Reilly 21'; Gribben 24', 28', 51'	SFL Report	McAnespie 91'	Attendance: 441; Referee: Roache

18 September 2010 Scottish Third Division	Arbroath	1 – 1	Albion Rovers	Gayfield Park
	Doris 78'	BBC Report	Love 70'	Attendance: 408; Referee: McLean

25 September 2010 Scottish Third Division	Stranraer	4 – 1	Arbroath	Stair Park
	Agnew 15', 59'; Winter 75'; One 89'	BBC Report	Doris 71'; Shields (red card) 38'	Attendance: 379; Referee: Hilland

2 October 2010 Scottish Third Division	Queen's Park	5 – 2	Arbroath	Hampden Park
	Brough 15', 66'; Watt 45+2'; Smith 71'; Daly 92'	BBC Report	Swankie 12'; Doris 49' (Penalty); Doris (yellow card) 62' (red card)	Attendance: 433; Referee: Northcroft

16 October 2010 Scottish Third Division	Arbroath	3 – 2	Clyde	Gayfield Park
	Swankie 58', 88'; Malcolm 80'; Chisholm (yellow card) 86' (red card)	BBC Report	Paterson 48'; Lithgow 83'; McGowan (red card) 89'	Attendance: 481; Referee: O'Reilly

6 November 2010 Scottish Third Division	Arbroath	3 – 2	Berwick Rangers	Gayfield Park
	Durnan 27'; Doris 31'; Swankie 82'	BBC Report	Brazil 19'; McLeod 52'	Attendance: 402; Referee: Charleston

10 November 2010 Scottish Third Division	East Stirlingshire	1 – 3	Arbroath	Ochilview Park
19:45	Cawley 5'	Report	Gibson 15'; Falkingham 42'; McGowan 82'	Attendance: 238; Referee: Robertson

13 November 2010 Scottish Third Division	Arbroath	4 – 0	Montrose	Gayfield Park
	Doris 21' (Penalty), 62', 66'; Sheerin 71'	BBC Report		Attendance: 738; Referee: Salmond

15 December 2010 Scottish Third Division	Arbroath	0 – 0	Stranraer	Gayfield Park
		BBC Report		Attendance: 302; Referee: Watters

2 January 2011 Scottish Third Division	Montrose	0 – 5	Arbroath	Links Park
	Hegarty (red card) 42'; Pope (yellow card) 55' (red card)	BBC Report	Falkingham 34', 51'; Swankie 40', 66'; Doris 92' (Penalty)	Attendance: 1,034; Referee: Roache

15 January 2011 Scottish Third Division	Berwick Rangers	0 – 4	Arbroath	Shielfield Park
		BBC Report	Swankie 68', 70'; Chisholm 78'; Gibson 88'	Attendance: 369; Referee: McKendrick

25 January 2011 Scottish Third Division	Arbroath	3 – 5	East Stirlingshire	Gayfield Park
19:45	McAnespie 23'; Alan Rattray 42'; Doris 67' (pen.)	Report	Johnston 28'; Dunn 38', 64'; Maguire 46'; Beveridge 82'	Attendance: 436; Referee: Robertson

29 January 2011 Scottish Third Division	Stranraer	3 – 4	Arbroath	Stair Park
	Agnew 14'; One 50'; Glen Mitchell 91'	BBC Report	Swankie 26', 56', 65'; Falkingham 38'; Chisholm (red card) 67'; Falkingham (yellow card) 92' (red card)	Attendance: 441; Referee: Charleston

5 February 2011 Scottish Third Division	Arbroath	3 – 0	Albion Rovers	Gayfield Park
	Swankie 7', 85'; Sheerin 69' (Penalty)	BBC Report	Gaston (red card) 66'	Attendance: 612; Referee: Colvin

12 February 2011 Scottish Third Division	Queen's Park	1 – 1	Arbroath	Hampden Park
	McBride 45' (Penalty)	BBC Report	Malcolm 4'	Attendance: 467; Referee: Nicholls

15 February 2011 Scottish Third Division	Annan Athletic	1 – 2	Arbroath	Galabank
	MacBeth (yellow card) 70' (red card); Griffin 81' (Own goal)	BBC Report	McGowan 49'; Wedderburn 53'; Malcolm (red card) 58'; Wedderburn (red card) 76'	Attendance: 304; Referee: Finnie

23 February 2011 Scottish Third Division	Arbroath	2 – 0	Elgin City	Gayfield Park
	Swankie 3'; Sheerin 20'	BBC Report	Kaczan (yellow card) 53' (red card)	Attendance: 403; Referee: Roache

26 February 2011 Scottish Third Division	Elgin City	3 – 2	Arbroath	Borough Briggs
	Crooks 61'; Nicolson 74'; O'Donoghue 76'	BBC Report	Gibson 52'; Strachan 84'	Attendance: 629; Referee: Somers

5 March 2011 Scottish Third Division	Arbroath	2 – 1	Annan Athletic	Gayfield Park
	Doris 25'; Swankie 49'	BBC Report	Gilfillan 53'	Attendance: 575; Referee: Beaton

8 March 2011 Scottish Third Division	Albion Rovers	0 – 2	Arbroath	Cliftonhill
		BBC Report	Doris 19', 54'	Attendance: 352; Referee: Robertson

12 March 2011 Scottish Third Division	Arbroath	2 – 1	Berwick Rangers	Gayfield Park
	Gibson 22'; Doris 52'	BBC Report	Hill 92' (Own goal)	Attendance: 491; Referee: Anderson

19 March 2011 Scottish Third Division	East Stirlingshire	2 – 5	Arbroath	Ochilview Park
15:00	Cawley 27'; Scott 82'	Report	Chisholm 43'; Doris 58'; Swankie 63', 78', 90'	Attendance: 349; Referee: Watters

22 March 2011 Scottish Third Division	Clyde	1 – 1	Arbroath	Broadwood
	Sawyers 70'	BBC Report	Falkingham 60'; Thomson (red card) 78'	Attendance: 532; Referee: Robertson

26 March 2011 Scottish Third Division	Arbroath	2 – 2	Stranraer	Gayfield Park
	Gallacher 67' (Own goal); Hill (red card) 70'; Swankie 82'	BBC Report	Agnew 72'; One 72'	Attendance: 701; Referee: Aitken

2 April 2011 Scottish Third Division	Albion Rovers	3 – 0	Arbroath	Cliftonhill
	Chaplain 5' (Penalty); Benton 38'; Love 41'	BBC Report		Attendance: 412; Referee: Colvin

9 April 2011 Scottish Third Division	Clyde	0 – 3	Arbroath	Broadwood
	Gibson 19'; Strachan 22'; McGowan 71'	BBC Report		Attendance: 725; Referee: McDermott

13 April 2011 Scottish Third Division	Arbroath	2 – 0	Clyde	Gayfield Park
	Doris 25'; Swankie 43'	BBC Report		Attendance: 604; Referee: Hilland

16 April 2011 Scottish Third Division	Arbroath	2 – 2	Queen's Park	Gayfield Park
	Gibson 39'; Wedderburn 49'	BBC Report	Smith 25'; Longworth 80'	Attendance: 912; Referee: Somers

23 April 2011 Scottish Third Division	Arbroath	4 – 1	Montrose	Gayfield Park
	Doris 5' (Penalty); Falkingham 44'; Sheerin 61'; Strachan 90'	ESPN Report	Masson 70'	Attendance: 1,243; Referee: Finnie

30 April 2011 Scottish Third Division	Annan Athletic	3 – 0	Arbroath	Galabank
	O'Connor 23', 66'; Sloan 72'	BBC Report		Attendance: 651; Referee: Roache

7 May 2011 Scottish Third Division	Arbroath	3 – 5	Elgin City	Gayfield Park
	Sheerin 29'; Swankie 50'; Falkingham 72'	BBC Report	Gormley 40', 45', 62'; Gunn 55'; Crooks 79' (Penalty)	Attendance: 1,125; Referee: Charleston

=== Scottish Challenge Cup ===
24 July 2010 Scottish Challenge Cup round 1	Dunfermline Athletic	1 – 0	Arbroath	East End Park
	Kirk 64'	ESPN Report		Attendance: 976; Referee: Madden

=== Scottish League Cup ===
31 July 2010 Scottish League Cup round 1	Dunfermline Athletic	5 – 2	Arbroath	East End Park
	Kirk 14', 76'; Willis 74'; McDougall 82'; Malcolm 91' (Own goal)	ESPN Report	Sheerin 12'; Swankie 88'	Attendance: 1,283; Referee: Charleston

=== Scottish Cup ===
23 October 2010 Scottish Cup round 2	Montrose	1 – 1	Arbroath	Links Park
	Sinclair 31'	ESPN Report	Doris 57'; Falkingham (yellow card) 67' (red card)	Attendance: 994; Referee: Madden

30 October 2010 Scottish Cup round 2 replay	Arbroath	2 – 3 (a.e.t.)	Montrose	Gayfield Park
	Alan Rattray 47', 51'; Malcolm (yellow card) 92' (red card)	ESPN Report	Hegarty 7'; McCord 22'; Boyle 114'; Boyle (red card) 123'	Attendance: 838; Referee: Madden

== Player statistics ==
=== Squad ===
No.	Pos	Nat	Player	Total		Third Division		Challenge Cup		League Cup		Scottish Cup	
No.	Pos	Nat	Player	Apps	Goals	Apps	Goals	Apps	Goals	Apps	Goals	Apps	Goals
	GK	(Scotland) SCO	Daryl Burns	2	0	1+1	0	0+0	0	0+0	0	0+0	0
	GK	(Scotland) SCO	Darren Hill	39	0	35+0	0	1+0	0	1+0	0	2+0	0
	GK	(Scotland) SCO	Steven Khan	0	0	0+0	0	0+0	0	0+0	0	0+0	0
	DF	(Northern Ireland) NIR	Danny Griffin	21	0	14+4	0	1+0	0	1+0	0	0+1	0
	DF	(Scotland) SCO	Stuart Malcolm	28	2	24+0	2	1+0	0	1+0	0	2+0	0
	DF	(Scotland) SCO	Kieran McAnespie	30	2	27+0	2	1+0	0	1+0	0	1+0	0
	DF	(Scotland) SCO	Marc McCulloch	11	0	8+1	0	1+0	0	1+0	0	0+0	0
	DF	(Scotland) SCO	Allan McManus	11	0	11+0	0	0+0	0	0+0	0	0+0	0
	DF	(Scotland) SCO	Kevin McMullan	31	0	30+1	0	0+0	0	0+0	0	0+0	0
	DF	(Scotland) SCO	Alan Rattray	11	3	9+0	1	0+0	0	0+0	0	2+0	2
	DF	(Scotland) SCO	Craig Wedderburn	16	2	12+4	2	0+0	0	0+0	0	0+0	0
	MF	(Scotland) SCO	Ross Chisholm	23	2	20+1	2	0+0	0	0+0	0	2+0	0
	MF	(Scotland) SCO	David Dimilta	21	0	7+11	0	1+0	0	0+0	0	1+1	0
	MF	(Scotland) SCO	Mark Durnan	11	1	9+0	1	0+0	0	0+0	0	2+0	0
	MF	(England) ENG	Josh Falkingham	38	9	33+2	9	1+0	0	1+0	0	1+0	0
	MF	(Scotland) SCO	Keith Gibson	30	8	26+1	8	1+0	0	0+0	0	2+0	0
	MF	(Scotland) SCO	David McGowan	36	6	8+24	6	1+0	0	0+1	0	1+1	0
	MF	(Scotland) SCO	Michael McIlravey	1	0	0+1	0	0+0	0	0+0	0	0+0	0
	MF	(Scotland) SCO	Ian Nimmo	3	0	0+2	0	0+1	0	0+0	0	0+0	0
	MF	(Scotland) SCO	Robbie Ross	6	0	1+4	0	0+0	0	0+1	0	0+0	0
	MF	(Scotland) SCO	Bryan Scott	1	0	0+0	0	0+1	0	0+0	0	0+0	0
	MF	(Scotland) SCO	Jay Shields	6	0	2+2	0	1+0	0	1+0	0	0+0	0
	MF	(Scotland) SCO	Paul Sheerin	39	6	30+5	5	1+0	0	1+0	1	1+1	0
	MF	(Scotland) SCO	Adam Strachan	16	3	12+4	3	0+0	0	0+0	0	0+0	0
	MF	(Scotland) SCO	Ryan Suttie	1	0	0+0	0	0+0	0	0+1	0	0+0	0
	MF	(Scotland) SCO	Darren Thomson	7	0	5+1	0	0+0	0	0+0	0	1+0	0
	FW	(Scotland) SCO	Patrick Deane	7	0	1+4	0	0+0	0	0+0	0	0+2	0
	FW	(Scotland) SCO	Steven Doris	32	17	25+5	16	0+0	0	0+0	0	2+0	1
	FW	(Scotland) SCO	Jim Hamilton	8	0	4+3	0	0+0	0	1+0	0	0+0	0
	FW	(Scotland) SCO	Jordyn Sheerin	15	0	2+12	0	0+0	0	1+0	0	0+0	0
	FW	(Scotland) SCO	Lee Sibanda	11	0	5+6	0	0+0	0	0+0	0	0+0	0
	FW	(Scotland) SCO	Gavin Swankie	40	23	35+1	22	0+1	0	1+0	1	2+0	0

== League table ==
Pos	Team	Pld	W	D	L	GF	GA	GD	Pts	Promotion or qualification
1	Arbroath (C, P)	36	20	6	10	80	61	+19	66	Promotion to the Second Division
2	Albion Rovers (O, P)	36	17	10	9	56	40	+16	61	Qualification for the Second Division Play-offs
3	Queen's Park	36	18	5	13	57	43	+14	59	Qualification for the Second Division Play-offs
4	Annan Athletic	36	16	11	9	58	45	+13	59	Qualification for the Second Division Play-offs
5	Stranraer	36	15	12	9	72	57	+15	57	

Source: SPFL
Rules for classification: 1) points; 2) goal difference; 3) number of goals scored.
(C) Champions; (O) Play-off winners; (P) Promoted
