= 2010–11 Scottish Third Division =

Irn-Bru Scottish Third Division
- Season: 2010–11
- Champions: Arbroath
- Promoted: Arbroath, Albion Rovers (via Division 2 Play-offs)
- Relegated: n/a
- Matches: 180
- Goals: 555 (3.08 per match)
- Top goalscorer: Gavin Swankie (21)
- Biggest home win: Montrose 8–1 Clyde (25 September 2010)
- Biggest away win: Montrose 0–5 Arbroath (2 January 2011); Berwick Rangers 1–6 Albion Rovers (15 March 2011)
- Highest scoring: Montrose 8–1 Clyde (25 September 2010)
- Longest winning run: 6 games Queen's Park
- Longest unbeaten run: 12 games Queen's Park
- Longest winless run: 14 games Clyde
- Longest losing run: 7 games Clyde
- Highest attendance: 1243: Arbroath 4–1 Montrose (23 April 2011)
- Lowest attendance: 178: East Stirlingshire 1–5 Annan Athletic (15 March 2011)

The 2010–11 Scottish Football League Third Division (also known as the 2010–11 Irn-Bru Scottish Football League Third Division for sponsorship reasons) was the 17th season in the format of ten teams in the fourth-tier of Scottish football. The season started on 7 August 2011 and ended on 7 May 2011. Arbroath F.C. sealed the title, their first honour in their 133-year history, after a 4-1 win over local rivals Montrose on 23 April 2011.

== Teams ==
=== Promotion and relegation from 2009–10 ===
Location of teams in 2010–11 Scottish Third Division

Livingston as champions of the 2009–10 season were directly promoted to the 2010–11 Scottish Second Division. Thus completing only a one-year stay in the bottom tier of the Scottish Football League. They were replaced by Clyde who finished bottom of the 2009–10 Scottish Second Division.

A second promotion place was available via a play-off tournament between the ninth-placed team of the 2009–10 Scottish Second Division, Arbroath, and the sides ranked second, third and fourth in the 2009–10 Scottish Third Division, Forfar Athletic, East Stirlingshire and Queen's Park respectively. The play off was won by Forfar Athletic who defeated Arbroath in the final. Arbroath were therefore relegated.

Relegated from Second Division to Third Division

- Clyde
- Arbroath (via play-offs)

Promoted from Third Division to Second Division

- Livingston
- Forfar Athletic (via play-offs)

=== Stadia and locations ===
Team	Location	Stadium	Capacity
Albion Rovers	Coatbridge	Cliftonhill	2,496
Annan Athletic	Annan	Galabank	3,000
Arbroath	Arbroath	Gayfield Park	4,153
Berwick Rangers	Berwick-upon-Tweed	Shielfield Park	4,065
Clyde	Cumbernauld	Broadwood	8,006
East Stirlingshire	Stenhousemuir	Ochilview Park^{[A]}	3,746
Elgin City	Elgin	Borough Briggs	3,716
Montrose	Montrose	Links Park	3,292
Queen's Park	Glasgow	Hampden Park	52,025
Stranraer	Stranraer	Stair Park	6,250

A.East Stirlingshire ground shared with Stenhousemuir.

== League table ==
Pos	Team	Pld	W	D	L	GF	GA	GD	Pts	Promotion or qualification
1	Arbroath (C, P)	36	20	6	10	80	61	+19	66	Promotion to the Second Division
2	Albion Rovers (O, P)	36	17	10	9	56	40	+16	61	Qualification for the Second Division Play-offs
3	Queen's Park	36	18	5	13	57	43	+14	59	Qualification for the Second Division Play-offs
4	Annan Athletic	36	16	11	9	58	45	+13	59	Qualification for the Second Division Play-offs
5	Stranraer	36	15	12	9	72	57	+15	57	
6	Berwick Rangers	36	12	13	11	62	56	+6	49	
7	Elgin City	36	13	6	17	53	63	−10	45	
8	Montrose	36	10	7	19	47	61	−14	37	
9	East Stirlingshire	36	10	4	22	33	62	−29	34	
10	Clyde	36	8	8	20	37	67	−30	32	

Source: SPFL
Rules for classification: 1) points; 2) goal difference; 3) number of goals scored.
(C) Champions; (O) Play-off winners; (P) Promoted

== Results ==
Teams play each other four times in this league. In the first half of the season each team plays every other team twice (home and away) and then do the same in the second half of the season, for a total of 36 games

=== First half of season ===
Home \ Away	ALB	ANN	ARB	BER	CLY	EST	ELG	MON	QPA	STR
Albion Rovers		0–0	0–2	2–2	3–1	1–0	3–1	3–1	2–1	1–2
Annan Athletic	4–1		1–2	1–1	0–2	3–1	0–1	2–2	2–1	2–2
Arbroath	1–1	0–2		3–2	3–2	2–0	2–0	4–0	1–0	0–0
Berwick Rangers	1–6	2–2	4–1		2–1	3–0	6–2	1–0	1–1	2–2
Clyde	1–2	0–2	1–1	1–4		1–2	1–1	1–1	2–3	2–2
East Stirlingshire	0–0	1–5	1–3	0–0	0–0		0–2	2–1	0–1	0–1
Elgin City	2–2	2–0	3–5	1–2	0–1	0–2		3–2	4–2	1–2
Montrose	0–2	1–1	3–0	1–1	8–1	0–2	0–1		1–2	3–3
Queen's Park	0–1	3–0	5–2	0–2	0–1	2–0	1–1	1–0		1–3
Stranraer	3–2	2–2	4–1	1–1	3–1	4–1	2–1	1–2	1–0	

Updated to match(es) played on 26 April 2011. Source: BBC Sport
Legend: Blue = home team win; Yellow = draw; Red = away team win.

=== Second half of season ===
Home \ Away	ALB	ANN	ARB	BER	CLY	EST	ELG	MON	QPA	STR
Albion Rovers		0–0	3–0	0–1	1–1	2–0	2–0	0–2	1–2	1–0
Annan Athletic	2–2		3–0	2–3	1–0	2–1	2–2	2–1	1–2	2–1
Arbroath	3–0	2–1		2–1	2–0	3–5	3–5	4–1	2–2	2–2
Berwick Rangers	2–2	2–3	0–4		1–1	1–1	4–0	0–1	3–1	3–3
Clyde	0–1	0–2	0–3	2–0		2–0	3–3	2–0	0–2	4–2
East Stirlingshire	1–2	2–0	2–5	1–0	2–0		2–1	1–2	3–2	0–2
Elgin City	1–1	2–3	3–2	3–2	0–1	2–0		1–0	0–1	2–1
Montrose	0–2	0–1	0–5	1–1	3–1	3–0	1–0		0–2	3–2
Queen's Park	2–1	0–1	1–1	1–0	4–0	2–0	1–0	4–1		3–3
Stranraer	1–3	1–1	3–4	3–1	3–0	2–0	1–2	2–2	2–1	

Updated to match(es) played on 7 May 2011. Source: ESPN soccernet
Legend: Blue = home team win; Yellow = draw; Red = away team win.

== Top goalscorers ==
21 goals

- (Scotland) Gavin Swankie (Arbroath)

17 goals

- (Scotland) Darren Gribben (Berwick Rangers)
- (France) Armand One (Stranraer)

16 goals

- (Scotland) Steven Doris (Arbroath)

14 goals

- (Scotland) Craig Malcolm (Stranraer)
- (Scotland) Ian Harty (Annan Athletic)

13 goals

- (Scotland) Scott Agnew (Stranraer)

=== Hat-tricks ===
Player	For	Against	Result	Date
(Scotland) Darren Gribben	Berwick Rangers	Elgin City	6–2	14 August 2010
(Scotland) Darren Gribben	Berwick Rangers	Arbroath	4–1	11 September 2010
(Scotland) Paul Tosh	Montrose	Clyde	8–1	25 September 2010
(Scotland) Steven Doris	Arbroath	Montrose	4–0	13 November 2010
(Scotland) Gavin Swankie	Arbroath	Stranraer	4–3	29 January 2011
(France) Armand One	Stranraer	East Stirlingshire	4–1	23 February 2011
(England) Damon Gray	Berwick Rangers	Elgin City	4–0	5 March 2011
(Scotland) Scott Chaplain	Albion Rovers	Berwick Rangers	6–1	15 March 2011
(Scotland) Gavin Swankie	Arbroath	East Stirlingshire	5–2	19 March 2011
(Scotland) Jamie Longworth	Queen's Park	Montrose	4–1	7 May 2011
(Scotland) David Gormley	Elgin City	Arbroath	5–3	7 May 2011

== See also ==
- Scottish football referee strike
