= Darren Hill =

Darren Hill may refer to:

- Darren Hill (footballer) (born 1981), Scottish footballer
- Darren Hill (musician), American musician
- Darryn Hill (born 1974), Australian racing cyclist
