= David Proctor (footballer, born 1984) =

Scottish footballer and manager

Personal information
- Full name: David William Proctor
- Date of birth: 4 May 1984 (age 42)
- Place of birth: Bellshill, Scotland
- Height: 6 ft 0 in (1.83 m)
- Positions: Right back; right midfielder

Youth career
- 2001–2003: Hibernian

Senior career*
| Years | Team | Apps | (Gls) |
| 2003–2006 | Inverness Caledonian Thistle | 33 | (3) |
| 2006–2007 | Dundee United | 12 | (0) |
| 2007 | → Airdrie United (loan) | 11 | (0) |
| 2007–2012 | Inverness Caledonian Thistle | 131 | (5) |
| 2012–2013 | FC Edmonton | 25 | (1) |
| 2014–2015 | Airdrieonians | 7 | (1) |
| 2016–2020 | East Kilbride | | |
| Total | | 219+ | (10+) |

Managerial career
- 2020: East Kilbride (interim)
- 2022-2024: Cumbernauld Colts
- * Club domestic league appearances and goals as of 12:00, 21 October 2024 (UTC)

David William Proctor (born 4 May 1984) is a former Scottish football player and coach, most recently manager of Lowland league outfit Cumbernauld Colts. In 2019 he gained a degree in Physiotherapy.

Proctor has also played for Inverness Caledonian Thistle, Dundee United, Canadian club FC Edmonton, Airdrieonians (two spells), and East Kilbride (three spells).

== Career ==
A right-sided player, Proctor began his professional career with Hibernian but didn't make an appearance and joined Inverness Caledonian Thistle in 2003. After three years with the Highlanders, which included winning the Scottish First Division in his first season, Proctor signed for Dundee United. Proctor was managed for a second time by Craig Brewster, who had been appointed United manager earlier that year.

Following Brewster's departure from Tannadice just two months later and Craig Levein's subsequent arrival, Proctor was set to move to Airdrie United in January 2007, only for FIFA to confirm Proctor's reserve appearance for Inverness in August 2006 counted and prevented him for playing for a third club within a year. The ruling was similar to the case of Javier Mascherano, whose January 2007 move from West Ham United to Liverpool received FIFA support but depended on Premier League permission. Both moves were eventually allowed.

After helping Airdrie to Scottish First Division play-off victory and thus ensuring the avoidance of relegation, Proctor returned to United, featuring in three pre-season friendlies against lower league opposition. Proctor was an unused substitute in the first two matches of the 2007–08 season before leaving by mutual consent on 31 August to return to Inverness Caledonian Thistle. Proctor left Inverness at the end of the 2011–12 season. He signed for Canadian NASL club FC Edmonton in July 2012. He left Edmonton in November 2013, after failing to agree a new contract.

Proctor then returned to Scotland and signed for Airdrieonians in July 2014. Although he was released from his playing contract due to injury in February 2015 Proctor agreed to continue at Airdrieonians in a scouting capacity. In April 2016 he signed for Lowland League club East Kilbride. After two seasons there, he returned to Airdrieonians in May 2018 as first team coach. He rejoined East Kilbride as a player in November 2018, left them at the end of the 2018–19 season, but rejoined them for a third spell in December 2019. In February 2020, Proctor and teammate Craig Malcolm took interim charge of the team after the departure of previous interim manager Jim Paterson.

Proctor joined Cumbernauld Colts as a first team coach ahead of the 2021-22 season. He would later take up the managers role at the club before departing on 19 October 2024.

In July 2025 Proctor was appointed as Physiotherapist for Inverness Caledonian Thistle FC.

== Career statistics ==
Active playing seasons only:

| Club | Season | League | | Cup | | Lg Cup | | Other | | Total | |
| Club | Season | Apps | Goals | Apps | Goals | Apps | Goals | Apps | Goals | Apps | Goals |
|---|---|---|---|---|---|---|---|---|---|---|---|
| Inverness Caledonian Thistle | 2004–05 | 11 | 0 | 3 | 0 | 1 | 0 | 3 | 0 | 18 | 0 |
| Inverness Caledonian Thistle | 2004–05 | 5 | 0 | – | – | – | – | – | – | 5 | 0 |
| Inverness Caledonian Thistle | 2005–06 | 17 | 3 | 2 | 0 | 3 | 0 | – | – | 22 | 3 |
| Inverness Caledonian Thistle | Total | 33 | 3 | 5 | 0 | 4 | 0 | 3 | 0 | 45 | 3 |
| Dundee United | 2006–07 | 12 | 0 | – | – | 2 | 0 | – | – | 14 | 0 |
| Dundee United | Total | 12 | 0 | 0 | 0 | 2 | 0 | 0 | 0 | 14 | 0 |
| Airdrie United (loan) | 2006–07 | 11 | 1 | – | – | – | – | 3 | 0 | 14 | 1 |
| Airdrie United (loan) | Total | 11 | 1 | 0 | 0 | 0 | 0 | 3 | 0 | 14 | 1 |
| Inverness Caledonian Thistle | 2007–08 | 21 | 1 | 1 | 0 | – | – | – | – | 22 | 1 |
| Inverness Caledonian Thistle | 2008–09 | 17 | 1 | 1 | 0 | – | – | – | – | 18 | 1 |
| Inverness Caledonian Thistle | Total | 38 | 2 | 2 | 0 | 0 | 0 | 0 | 0 | 40 | 2 |
| Career total | | 94 | 6 | 7 | 0 | 6 | 0 | 6 | 0 | 113 | 6 |

== Honours ==
Inverness Caledonian Thistle

- Scottish First Division: 2003–04; 2009–10

East Kilbride

- Lowland Football League: 2018–19
- SFA South Region Challenge Cup: 2018–19
