= Steven Doris =

Scottish footballer

Personal information
- Full name: Steven James Doris
- Date of birth: 9 August 1988 (age 38)
- Place of birth: Perth, Scotland
- Height: 5 ft 10 in (1.78 m)
- Positions: Midfielder; forward

Senior career*
| Years | Team | Apps | (Gls) |
| 2005–2009 | St Johnstone | 4 | (0) |
| 2007–2008 | → Montrose (loan) | 25 | (4) |
| 2008 | → Montrose (loan) | 5 | (0) |
| 2008–2009 | → Arbroath (loan) | 6 | (2) |
| 2009–2012 | Arbroath | 125 | (54) |
| 2013–2014 | Dundee | 12 | (0) |
| 2013–2014 | → Arbroath (loan) | 2 | (1) |
| 2014–2016 | Stirling Albion | 51 | (13) |
| 2016–2020 | Arbroath | 73 | (15) |
| 2020–2022 | Forfar Athletic | 31 | (1) |
- * Club domestic league appearances and goals as of 17:30, 11 January 2022 (UTC)

Steven James Doris (born 9 August 1988) is a Scottish retired footballer. His clubs include St Johnstone, Montrose, Arbroath, Dundee, Stirling Albion and Forfar Athletic. Although generally regarded as a midfielder, he could also play as a striker.

== Career ==
Doris made his league debut on 26 November 2005, as a late substitute for St Johnstone manager Owen Coyle in a 1–1 draw with Stranraer at McDiarmid Park. He joined Montrose on loan in October 2007, where he scored four goals in 25 league appearances. Doris played in five more league matches in a second loan spell with Montrose the following season before joining Arbroath on loan in November 2008. He made six league appearances for the club, scoring twice, before returning to St Johnstone, who released him at the end of his contract.

Doris returned to Arbroath on a free transfer in June 2009, and scored six league goals as the club were relegated to the Third Division at the end of the campaign after losing in the play-offs to Forfar Athletic. Under the management of former St Johnstone teammate Paul Sheerin, Arbroath won promotion back to the Second Division as champions in April 2011. Doris' goal in the 4–1 win against Montrose, that secured the title for Arbroath, was his 16th of the season and he described the victory as "the best feeling of my life".

He signed a 12-month contract extension in June, which pleased Sheerin. "Steven was a great foil for Gavin Swankie last season," he said. "Keeping him at the club is massive for us. It's great news." On 1 December 2012, Doris grabbed a historic equaliser for Arbroath against Celtic in the 87th minute of a Scottish Cup tie at Celtic Park. He went on trial at Birmingham City in early 2013 and was rumoured to be signing at the end of the season, but was also linked with Partick Thistle.

On 9 July 2013, Doris signed for Scottish Championship side Dundee. After only five months at Dens Park, on 6 December 2013, he re-joined Arbroath on loan until 26 January 2014.

Doris was released by Dundee in June 2014 and signed for Stirling Albion.

At the end of the 2015–16 season, Doris departed Forthbank Stadium and returned to his former side Arbroath. On 9 September 2017, Doris was injured during the first half of Arbroath's 4–1 defeat against Albion Rovers, and it was later confirmed he had suffered a cruciate ligament injury. On 20 October 2018, 406 days after his injury, he made his comeback as a substitute at home to Dumbarton, scoring two minutes after entering the field. At the end of the 2018–19 season Arbroath were crowned Scottish League One champions, which meant Doris became the first player in the club's history to win three league title medals.

Ahead of the 2019–20 season in the Scottish Championship, Doris signed a new contract with Arbroath.

On 11 January 2022, Doris announced his retirement from football, and received tributes from former clubs Arbroath and Forfar Athletic.

== Career statistics ==
As of match played 8 January 2022

Appearances and goals by club, season and competition
| Club | Season | League | | | Scottish Cup | | League Cup | | Other | | total | |
| Club | Season | Division | Apps | Goals | Apps | Goals | Apps | Goals | Apps | Goals | Apps | Goals |
|---|---|---|---|---|---|---|---|---|---|---|---|---|
| St Johnstone | 2005–06 | Scottish First Division | 2 | 0 | 0 | 0 | 0 | 0 | 0 | 0 | 2 | 0 |
| St Johnstone | 2006–07 | Scottish First Division | 0 | 0 | 0 | 0 | 0 | 0 | 1 (Note: Appearances in the Scottish Challenge Cup) | 0 | 1 | 0 |
| St Johnstone | 2007–08 | Scottish First Division | 0 | 0 | 0 | 0 | 0 | 0 | 0 | 0 | 0 | 0 |
| St Johnstone | 2008–09 | Scottish First Division | 2 | 0 | 0 | 0 | 0 | 0 | 0 | 0 | 2 | 0 |
| St Johnstone | Total | | 4 | 0 | 0 | 0 | 0 | 0 | 1 | 0 | 5 | 0 |
| Montrose (loan) | 2007–08 | Scottish Third Division | 25 | 4 | 3 | 0 | 0 | 0 | 2 (Note: Appearances in the Second Division play-offs) | 0 | 30 | 4 |
| Montrose (loan) | 2008–09 | Scottish Third Division | 5 | 0 | 0 | 0 | 0 | 0 | 0 | 0 | 5 | 0 |
| Arbroath (loan) | 2008–09 | Scottish Second Division | 6 | 2 | 0 | 0 | 0 | 0 | 0 | 0 | 6 | 2 |
| Arbroath | 2009–10 | Scottish Second Division | 30 | 6 | 1 | 0 | 2 | 0 | 5 (Note: One appearance in the Scottish Challenge Cup and four in the Second Division play-offs) | 0 | 38 | 6 |
| Arbroath | 2010–11 | Scottish Third Division | 30 | 16 | 2 | 1 | 0 | 0 | 0 | 0 | 32 | 17 |
| Arbroath | 2011–12 | Scottish Second Division | 33 | 21 | 2 | 0 | 1 | 0 | 3 (Note: One appearance in the Scottish Challenge Cup and two appearances in the First Division play-offs) | 0 | 39 | 21 |
| Arbroath | 2012–13 | Scottish Second Division | 32 | 11 | 4 | 3 | 1 | 0 | 5 | 1 | 42 | 15 |
| Arbroath | Total | | 125 | 54 | 9 | 4 | 4 | 0 | 13 | 1 | 151 | 59 |
| Dundee | 2013–14 | Scottish Championship | 12 | 0 | 0 | 0 | 1 | 0 | 2 | 0 | 15 | 0 |
| Arbroath (loan) | 2013–14 | Scottish League One | 2 | 1 | 0 | 0 | 0 | 0 | 0 | 0 | 2 | 1 |
| Stirling Albion | 2014–15 | Scottish League One | 15 | 4 | 3 | 2 | 1 | 0 | 1 | 0 | 20 | 6 |
| Stirling Albion | 2015–16 | Scottish League Two | 36 | 9 | 5 | 3 | 1 | 0 | 0 | 0 | 42 | 12 |
| Stirling Albion | Total | | 51 | 13 | 8 | 5 | 2 | 0 | 1 | 0 | 62 | 18 |
| Arbroath | 2016–17 | Scottish League Two | 36 | 12 | 2 | 1 | 4 | 0 | 2 | 0 | 44 | 13 |
| Arbroath | 2017–18 | Scottish League One | 5 | 1 | 0 | 0 | 4 | 2 | 1 | 0 | 10 | 3 |
| Arbroath | 2018–19 | Scottish League One | 20 | 2 | 1 | 0 | 0 | 0 | 1 | 0 | 22 | 2 |
| Arbroath | 2019–20 | Scottish Championship | 12 | 0 | 0 | 0 | 4 | 1 | 2 | 0 | 18 | 1 |
| Arbroath | Total | | 73 | 15 | 3 | 1 | 12 | 3 | 6 | 0 | 94 | 19 |
| Forfar Athletic | 2019–20 | Scottish League One | 7 | 1 | 0 | 0 | 0 | 0 | 0 | 0 | 7 | 1 |
| Forfar Athletic | 2020–21 | Scottish League One | 12 | 0 | 3 | 0 | 0 | 0 | 0 | 0 | 15 | 0 |
| Forfar Athletic | 2021–22 | Scottish League Two | 12 | 0 | 0 | 0 | 1 | 0 | 2 | 0 | 15 | 0 |
| Forfar Athletic | Total | | 31 | 1 | 3 | 0 | 1 | 0 | 2 | 0 | 37 | 1 |
| Career total | | | 334 | 90 | 26 | 10 | 20 | 3 | 27 | 1 | 407 | 104 |

== Honours ==
=== Club ===
Arbroath

- Scottish Third Division: 2010–11
- Scottish League Two: 2016–17
- Scottish League One 2018–19

Dundee

- Scottish Championship: 2013–14

=== Individual ===
- Scottish Football League Player of the Month: November 2010, February 2012
- Scottish League Two Player of the Month: February 2016
- PFA Scotland Second Division Team of the Year: 2011–12, 2012–13
- PFA Scotland Scottish League Two Team of the Year: 2016–17
