= Chris Hegarty (footballer, born 1984) =

Scottish footballer

Personal information
- Full name: Christopher Hegarty
- Date of birth: 24 July 1984 (age 42)
- Place of birth: Monifieth, Scotland
- Height: 1.85 m (6 ft 1 in)
- Position: Midfielder

Senior career*
Years	Team	Apps	(Gls)
2004–2005	Dundee	4	(0)
2005	→ Peterhead (loan)	5	(0)
2005–2007	Peterhead	33	(2)
2007–2008	Arbroath	12	(1)
2008–2011	Montrose	76	(5)
2011–2012	Forfar Athletic	24	(0)
2012–2013	Ballingry Rovers	0	(0)
2013–2016	Buckie Thistle		
2016–2017	Montrose	0	(0)
- * Club domestic league appearances and goals as of 13:25, 12 June 2017 (UTC)

Chris Hegarty (born 24 July 1984) is a Scottish footballer who plays as a midfielder.

== Career ==
Hegarty came through the youth ranks at Dundee and made several first team appearances, including four in the Scottish Premier League. He moved to Peterhead on loan, however, and eventually signed for the club on a permanent basis. After a brief spell with Arbroath during the 2007–08 season, Jim Weir took Chris to Montrose on transfer deadline day in January 2008.

Hegarty grabbed an opportunity in November to stake a claim for the right back position vacated by David Worrell. He strung together a series of excellent performances in both the attacking and defensive parts of his game. Hegarty scored his first Montrose goal from the penalty spot in a 3–1 home win against Elgin City in January 2009. Hegarty's tough tackling and creative attacks made him a firm favourite with the Montrose fans in 2009 but during the dreadful 2009–10 season Hegarty picked up numerous cards and had the worst disciplinary record in Scottish football.

After one season with Forfar Athletic, Hegarty signed for Ballingry Rovers in the 2012 summer transfer window. On 1 July 2013, Hegarty signed for Highland League side Buckie Thistle. In July 2016, Hegarty resigned for Scottish League Two club Montrose on a one-year deal. Hegarty left Montrose in May 2017 at the end of his contract.
