= Paul Kaczan =

Scottish footballer

Personal information
- Date of birth: 3 February 1983 (age 43)
- Place of birth: Scotland
- Position: Defender

Youth career
- –1999: Celtic Boys Club

Senior career*
Years	Team	Apps	(Gls)
1999–2003	Heart of Midlothian	1	(0)
2003–2003	Alloa Athletic	0	(0)
2003–2004	Partick Thistle	0	(0)
2004–2014	Elgin City	202	(16)
- * Club domestic league appearances and goals as of 26 August 2011

Paul Kaczan (born 3 February 1983) in Scotland) is a Scottish former footballer who plays for Elgin City.

== Club career ==
During his career, Kaczan has played for the Celtic Boys Club, Heart of Midlothian, Alloa Athletic, Partick Thistle. and Elgin City.

He currently plays for Elgin City in Scottish League Two, where he was captain.
