= Jay Shields =

Scottish footballer

Personal information
- Date of birth: 6 January 1985 (age 41)
- Place of birth: Edinburgh, Scotland
- Position: Defensive midfielder

Team information
- Current team: Bo'ness United

Senior career*
Years	Team	Apps	(Gls)
2004–2007	Hibernian	16	(0)
2005–2006	→ Berwick Rangers (loan)	12	(0)
2006–2007	→ Dundee (loan)	19	(0)
2007–2008	Greenock Morton	19	(0)
2008–2010	Cowdenbeath	36	(0)
2010	→ Berwick Rangers	13	(0)
2010–2011	Arbroath	4	(0)
2011–	Bo'ness United		
- * Club domestic league appearances and goals as of 28 September 2011

Jay Shields (born 6 January 1985) is a Scottish footballer who plays for junior side Bo'ness United.

Shields has played for Hibernian, Greenock Morton, Cowdenbeath and Arbroath, with loan spells at Berwick Rangers and Dundee.

== Career ==
A tough battler and a competent defender, Shields made his Hibernian début in 2004. He was loaned out to Berwick Rangers in the first half of the 2005–06 season for first-team experience. After returning to a Hibs squad ravaged with injuries later in the 2005–06 season, Shields made seven starts in the right back position. He was then given a new one-year deal at Hibs. With other players returning to fitness, however, he struggled to gain a place in the Hibs team during the 2006–07 season. He was loaned to Dundee in December 2006, and was released by Hibs at the end of the season.

Shields joined Greenock Morton in August 2007. He then joined Cowdenbeath in January 2008, on a free transfer.

In February 2010, Shields re-joined Berwick Rangers after being released by Cowdenbeath.

In July 2010, Shields signed for Arbroath. He was released at the end of that season, in May 2011.

In September 2011, Shields signed for Bo'ness United.
