= Josh Falkingham =

English footballer (born 1990)

Personal information
- Full name: Joshua David Falkingham
- Date of birth: 25 August 1990 (age 36)
- Place of birth: Leeds, England
- Height: 5 ft 6 in (1.68 m)
- Position: Midfielder

Team information
- Current team: Harrogate Town
- Number: 44

Youth career
- 1998–2010: Leeds United

Senior career*
Years	Team	Apps	(Gls)
2010	St Johnstone	1	(0)
2010–2012	Arbroath	70	(17)
2012–2016	Dunfermline Athletic	120	(14)
2016–2017	Darlington	26	(1)
2017–2025	Harrogate Town	262	(6)
2025–	Harrogate Town	1	(0)
- * Club domestic league appearances and goals as of 09:59, 22 November 2025 (UTC)

Joshua David Falkingham (born 25 August 1990) is an English professional footballer who plays as a midfielder for National League club Harrogate Town, where he is also director of youth football.

Falkingham started his career as a youth player with Leeds United, before having spells with St Johnstone and Arbroath. He spent four years with Dunfermline Athletic, where he won promotion to the Scottish Championship, as well as being club captain over two spells.

== Club career ==
Falkingham grew up in Rothwell just outside Leeds and played at youth level for Leeds United from the age of eight. He featured in their various youth teams for eleven years, however was unable to break through to the first team and was released from the club in 2010.

On 19 March 2010, Falkingham signed for Scottish Premier League side St Johnstone, on a short-term deal. On 5 May 2010, he made his debut for the club, coming on as a 28th-minute substitute replacing Murray Davidson in a 0–0 draw with Falkirk. After only one appearance, Falkingham was released by the club at the end of the season.

In June 2010, he signed for Scottish Third Division side Arbroath on a one-year deal. He made his debut on 24 July 2010, in a 1–0 defeat to Dunfermline Athletic in the Challenge Cup. On 7 August 2010, the opening day of the league season, he scored twice in a 5–3 win over Elgin City. He was a regular starter in his first season, scoring 9 goals and helping the team win the title and promotion to the Scottish Second Division.

Falkingham signed a contract extension to extend his stay at the club for another season. He held his place in the team and scored a further eight goals, with the team finishing second in the league, losing out on promotion in the play-offs. He was subsequently named in the PFA Scotland's Division Two Team of the Year. In all Falkingham made 70 league appearances, scoring 17 times for Arbroath.

On 8 June 2012, Falkingham signed for Scottish First Division side Dunfermline Athletic on a three-year deal. An undisclosed development fee was paid to Arbroath as compensation due to his age. He made his debut on 28 July 2012, in a 3–2 defeat to Forfar Athletic in the Challenge Cup. On 11 August 2012, he made his league debut in a 4–0 win over Cowdenbeath, scoring the last goal. In September 2013 he scored a stunning goal against Ayr United in which the game ended 5–1.

On 20 February 2014, Falkingham signed a contract extension until 31 May 2016. After achieving promotion to the second tier of Scottish football, Falkingham was released by Dunfermline at the end of the 2015–16 season.

After four months without a club, Falkingham signed for National League North side Darlington 1883 in September 2016, making his debut in a 0–1 defeat against Lancaster City in the Second qualifying round of the FA Cup.

In May 2017, Falkingham signed for Harrogate Town. He went on to win the National League play-offs in the 2019–20 season and the 2019–20 FA Trophy, scoring the winning goal in the club's first-ever FA Trophy triumph. The final was played on 3 May 2021 due to the COVID-19 pandemic.

In April 2025, Harrogate Town announced that Falkingham would not be remaining with the club as a player beyond the end of the 2024–25 season. Having remained with the club as Director of Youth Football, an injury crisis saw him return in a playing capacity in November 2025 on non-contract terms.

== Career statistics ==
As of end of 2024–25 season

Appearances and goals by club, season and competition
Club	Season	League			National Cup		League Cup		Other		Total	
Club	Season	Division	Apps	Goals	Apps	Goals	Apps	Goals	Apps	Goals	Apps	Goals
St Johnstone	2009–10	Scottish Premier League	1	0	0	0	0	0	—		1	0
Arbroath	2010–11	Scottish Division Three	35	9	0	0	1	0	1 (Note: Appearances in Scottish Challenge Cup)	0	37	9
Arbroath	2011–12	Scottish Division Two	35	8	2	0	1	0	3 (Note: One appearance in Scottish Challenge Cup and two in Scottish First Division play-offs)	0	41	8
Arbroath	Total		70	17	2	0	2	0	4	0	78	17
Dunfermline Athletic	2012–13	Scottish Division One	30	3	2	0	2	0	5 (Note: One appearance in Scottish Challenge Cup and four in Scottish First Division play-offs)	0	39	3
Dunfermline Athletic	2013–14	Scottish League One	30	5	4	0	2	0	6 (Note: Two appearances in Scottish Challenge Cup and four in Scottish Championship play-offs)	0	42	5
Dunfermline Athletic	2014–15	Scottish League One	32	3	2	0	2	0	2	0	38	3
Dunfermline Athletic	2015–16	Scottish League One	28	3	3	0	3	0	1	0	35	3
Dunfermline Athletic	Total		120	14	11	0	9	0	14	0	154	14
Darlington 1883	2016–17	National League North	26	1	0	0	—		0	0	26	1
Harrogate Town	2017–18	National League North	42	1	1	1	—		4 (Note: Appearances in FA Trophy)	0	47	2
Harrogate Town	2018–19	National League	42	1	2	0	—		3	0	47	1
Harrogate Town	2019–20	National League	34	4	2	0	—		2	1	38	5
Harrogate Town	2020–21	League Two	43	0	2	0	2	0	0	0	47	0
Harrogate Town	2021–22	League Two	34	0	3	0	0	0	6 (Note: Appearances in EFL Trophy)	0	43	0
Harrogate Town	2022–23	League Two	35	0	2	0	0	0	2	0	39	0
Harrogate Town	2023–24	League Two	24	0	2	0	1	0	1	0	28	0
Harrogate Town	2024–25	League Two	8	0	1	0	0	0	3	0	12	0
Harrogate Town	Total		262	6	15	1	3	0	21	1	301	8
Career totals			479	38	28	1	14	0	38	1	559	40

== Honours ==
Dunfermline Athletic

- Scottish League One: 2015–16

Harrogate Town

- National League play-offs: 2020
- FA Trophy: 2019–20
