= Paul Millar (Scottish footballer) =

Scottish footballer

Personal information
- Date of birth: 12 April 1988 (age 38)
- Place of birth: Dunfermline, Scotland
- Position: Forward

Youth career
- 2007–2009: Kirkcaldy YM

Senior career*
Years	Team	Apps	(Gls)
2009–2010	RAF Men's Senior Team		
2010–2011	Elgin City	17	(13)
2011–2014	Elgin City	48	(43)
2014–2015	Formartine United	0	(0)
2015–2016	Deveronvale	12	(8)
- * Club domestic league appearances and goals

Paul Millar is a Scottish former footballer who last played for Deveronvale and is most notably remembered for his time at Elgin City F.C. Standing at 6 feet 10 inches (2.08 m) tall, Millar is widely recognised as the tallest player in world football to date. Millar was signed in January 2010 by then manager Ross Jack, after impressing at a Royal Air Force fixture held at the club's stadium. Millar is the only Elgin City F.C player to have scored in the League Two playoffs after an expertly dispatched volley beat Albion Rovers (1–0) in the first leg at Borough Briggs. Elgin City went on to lose the tie 2–1 in the second leg.

Millar was involved in a nasty challenge and ruptured his ACL in April 2013 in the last minute of a 4–2 home victory against Clyde F.C where he scored a double to help his team to victory.

He was recently inducted into the Kirckaldy YM Hall of Fame at the annual award ceremony.

After struggling with the injury to his cruciate knee ligament, Millar moved to Formartine United in July 2014, but left exactly a year later for fellow Scottish side Deveronvale, but never fully recovered.
