= Dougie Cameron =

Scottish footballer (born 1983)

Personal information
- Full name: Douglas Cameron
- Date of birth: 8 February 1983 (age 43)
- Place of birth: Dundee, Scotland
- Height: 1.78 m (5 ft 10 in)
- Position: Midfielder

Team information
- Current team: Carnoustie pamnure (manager)

Youth career
- 2000–2002: Dundee

Senior career*
Years	Team	Apps	(Gls)
2002–2004	Dundee	11	(0)
2002–2003	→ Peterhead (loan)	27	(1)
2004–2005	→ Forfar Athletic (loan)	5	(0)
2005–2007	Peterhead	83	(11)
2007–2009	East Fife	72	(10)
2009–2010	Peterhead	14	(1)
2010	Sunshine George Cross	14	(1)
2010–2012	Montrose	60	(4)
2012–2013	Ballingry Rovers		
2013	Broughty Athletic		
Total		286	(28)
- * Club domestic league appearances and goals

Douglas Cameron (born 8 February 1983) is a Scottish retired professional footballer.

== Career ==
Cameron started his senior career with Dundee, for whom he made eleven appearances in the Scottish Premier League. He subsequently played for a few Scottish Football League clubs, including Peterhead and East Fife. In January 2010, he was released by Peterhead to allow him to take up an opportunity to play football in Australia. Cameron returned to Scotland later that year, and signed for Montrose in October. He left Montrose in 2012, and has since played in junior football for Ballingry Rovers and Broughty Athletic.
