= 2010–11 Scottish Cup =

Tournament details
- Country: Scotland

Final positions
- Champions: Celtic
- Runners-up: Motherwell

Tournament statistics
- Top goal scorer: John Sutton (6)

The 2010–11 Scottish Cup was the 126th season of Scotland's most prestigious football knockout competition.

Celtic won the competition after they defeated Motherwell 3–0.

== Calendar ==
| Round | Draw date | First match date | Fixtures | | Clubs |
| Round | Draw date | First match date | Original | Replays | Clubs |
|---|---|---|---|---|---|
| First round | Wednesday 1 September 2010 | Saturday 25 September 2010 | 17 | 7 | 81 → 64 |
| Second round | Wednesday 29 September 2010 | Saturday 23 October 2010 | 16 | 4 | 64 → 48 |
| Third round | Thursday 28 October 2010 | Saturday 20 November 2010 | 16 | 3 | 48 → 32 |
| Fourth round | Monday 22 November 2010 | Saturday 8 January 2011 | 16 | 7 | 32 → 16 |
| Fifth round | Tuesday 11 January 2011 | Saturday 5 February 2011 | 8 | 1 | 16 → 8 |
| Quarter-finals | Sunday 6 February 2011 | Saturday 12 March 2011 | 4 | 2 | 8 → 4 |
| Semi-finals | Sunday 13 March | Saturday/Sunday 16/17 April 2011 | 2 | N/A | 4 → 2 |
| Final | N/A | Saturday 21 May 2011 | 1 | N/A | 2 → 1 |

From the first round to the third round, postponed or drawn ties were normally replayed on the following weekend and thereafter on consecutive midweeks. From the fourth round to the sixth round, postponed or drawn ties were normally replayed on the second midweek after the original date, and thereafter on consecutive midweeks. There were no replays in the semi-finals or the Final.

== First round ==
The first-round draw was conducted on 1 September 2010.

Wick Academy received a bye into the second round.

| Home team | Score | Away team |
|---|---|---|
| Golspie Sutherland | 2–2 | Fort William |
| Rothes | 2–2 | Nairn County |
| Civil Service Strollers | 1–2 | Wigtown & Bladnoch |
| Edinburgh City | 1–0 | Clachnacuddin |
| Glasgow University | 1–0 | Burntisland Shipyard |
| Beith | 2–0 | Linlithgow Rose |
| Coldstream | 1–3 | Forres Mechanics |
| Fraserburgh | 3–3 | St Cuthbert Wanderers |
| Hawick Royal Albert | 0–3 | Dalbeattie Star |
| Newton Stewart | 1–1 | Preston Athletic |
| Edinburgh University | 2–2 | Brora Rangers |
| Deveronvale | 0–0 | Inverurie Loco Works |
| Lossiemouth | 0–2 | Whitehill Welfare |
| Vale of Leithen | 1–3 | Keith |
| Huntly | 2–2 | Girvan |
| Selkirk | 1–6 | Bo'ness United |
| Gala Fairydean | 1–6 | Sunnybank |

Source: BBC Sport

=== First round replays ===
Matches were played on 2 October 2010.

| Home team | Score | Away team |
|---|---|---|
| Fort William | 2–3 | Golspie Sutherland |
| Nairn County | 4–1 | Rothes |
| St Cuthbert Wanderers | 3–1 | Fraserburgh |
| Preston Athletic | 3–0 | Newton Stewart |
| Brora Rangers | 2–1 | Edinburgh University |
| Inverurie Loco Works | 0–5 | Deveronvale |
| Girvan | 2–1 | Huntly |

Source: BBC Sport

== Second round ==
The second-round draw was conducted on 29 September 2010.

| Home team | Score | Away team |
|---|---|---|
| Deveronvale | 1–0 | Dalbeattie Star |
| Forres Mechanics | 0–0 | East Stirlingshire |
| Preston Athletic | 0–0 | Annan Athletic |
| Clyde | 1–2 | Berwick Rangers |
| Wigtown & Bladnoch | 1–7 | Buckie Thistle |
| Beith | 8–1 | Glasgow University |
| Nairn County | 0–1 | Cove Rangers |
| Keith | 0–3 | Spartans |
| Stranraer | 9–0 | St Cuthbert Wanderers |
| Bo'ness United | 2–1 | Queen's Park |
| Whitehill Welfare | 4–3 | Wick Academy |
| Golspie Sutherland | 2–2 | Girvan |
| Montrose | 1–1 | Arbroath |
| Edinburgh City | 2–4 | Threave Rovers |
| Albion Rovers | 0–1 | Sunnybank |
| Elgin City | 5–3 | Brora Rangers |

Source: BBC Sport

=== Second round replays ===
Matches were played on 30 October 2010.

| Home team | Score | Away team |
|---|---|---|
| East Stirlingshire | 4–0 | Forres Mechanics |
| Annan Athletic | 5–0 | Preston Athletic |
| Girvan | 4–0 | Golspie Sutherland |
| Arbroath | 2–3 (a.e.t.) | Montrose |

Source: BBC Sport

== Third round ==
The third-round draw was conducted on 28 October 2010.

| Home team | Score | Away team |
|---|---|---|
| Peterhead | 2–0 | Cowdenbeath |
| Ross County | 4–1 | Deveronvale |
| East Fife | 3–1 | Forfar Athletic |
| Bo'ness United | 0–2 | Buckie Thistle |
| Spartans | 1–2 | East Stirlingshire |
| Stirling Albion | 1–3 | Partick Thistle |
| Cove Rangers | 0–3 | Berwick Rangers |
| Stenhousemuir | 2–2 | Threave Rovers |
| Brechin City | 2–2 | Annan Athletic |
| Airdrie United | 2–2 | Beith |
| Dumbarton | 1–2 | Greenock Morton |
| Alloa Athletic | 4–2 | Raith Rovers |
| Montrose | 3–1 | Whitehill Welfare |
| Ayr United | 5–0 | Sunnybank |
| Elgin City | 2–1 | Livingston |
| Stranraer | 4–2 | Girvan |

Source: BBC Sport

=== Third round replays ===
Matches were played on 4 January 2011 with the exception of Threave Rovers v Stenhousemuir which took place on Wednesday 12 January having been postponed for 4 January 5 January, 8 January & 11 January, all the matches were originally scheduled for 27 November then 30 November (postponed due to weather conditions) and 7 December (6 December for Threave Rovers v Stenhousemuir) (again postponed due to weather conditions) and also 14 December again postponed for weather conditions, the Annan match had also been scheduled for the next night following the postponement of the 14 December match. Following this the matches were scheduled for 21 December then 28 December but on both occasions they were again postponed due to the weather conditions.

| Home team | Score | Away team |
|---|---|---|
| Threave Rovers | 1–5 | Stenhousemuir |
| Annan Athletic | 2–5 | Brechin City |
| Beith | 3–4 | Airdrie United |

Source: BBC Sport

== Fourth round ==
The fourth-round draw was conducted on 22 November 2010 at 11:30am at Hampden Park live on Sky Sports News and Sky Sports News HD. These ties took place on Saturday 8 January and Sunday 9 January for the Dundee and Berwick Rangers matches with the Rangers tie the following night (Monday 10 January). The Falkirk and Queen of the South ties took place on Tuesday 11 January and the Morton tie took place on Tuesday 18 January after all 3 were postponed for 8 January. Hearts v St Johnstone also took place on 11 January & East Stirlingshire v Buckie Thistle took place on Wednesday 19 January having both been postponed for 9 January and the Stranraer tie took place on Tuesday 18 January following the Threave Rovers v Stenhousemuir replay from the last round being carried over to Wednesday 12 January due to the weather conditions. East Stirlingshire defeated Buckie Thistle 1–0 in the fourth round but were expelled due to fielding an ineligible player. Buckie Thistle qualified for the fifth round.

| Home team | Score | Away team |
|---|---|---|
| Aberdeen | 6–0 | East Fife |
| Berwick Rangers | 0–2 | Celtic |
| Dundee | 0–4 | Motherwell |
| Dundee United | 0–0 | Ross County |
| East Stirlingshire | 1–0 | Buckie Thistle |
| Falkirk | 2–2 | Partick Thistle |
| Hamilton Academical | 2–0 | Alloa Athletic |
| Hearts | 0–1 | St Johnstone |
| Hibernian | 0–0 | Ayr United |
| Inverness CT | 2–0 | Elgin City |
| Montrose | 2–2 | Dunfermline Athletic |
| Morton | 2–2 | Airdrie United |
| Queen of the South | 1–2 | Brechin City |
| Rangers | 3–0 | Kilmarnock |
| Stenhousemuir | 0–0 | Stranraer |
| St Mirren | 0–0 | Peterhead |

Source: BBC Sport

- Buckie Thistle progressed after East Stirlingshire fielded an ineligible player.

=== Fourth round replays ===
The Dunfermline tie was originally scheduled for 11 January but was postponed and played on 18 January which was also when the rest of the ties were played except Airdrie v Morton & Stranraer v Stenhousemuir which were played on 25 January.

| Home team | Score | Away team |
|---|---|---|
| Ayr United | 1–0 | Hibernian |
| Dunfermline Athletic | 5–3 | Montrose |
| Partick Thistle | 1–0 | Falkirk |
| Peterhead | 1–6 | St Mirren |
| Ross County | 0–0 (a.e.t.); 3–4 (pens) | Dundee United |
| Airdrie United | 2–5 | Morton |
| Stranraer | 4–3 | Stenhousemuir |

Source: BBC Sport

== Fifth round ==
The fifth-round draw was conducted on Tuesday 11 January 2011 at 2:30pm at Hampden Park live on Sky Sports News and Sky Sports News HD. The ties were played on Saturday, 5 February & Sunday, 6 February, except for the St Johnstone v Partick Thistle match, which was postponed to Tuesday, 8 February due to an unplayable pitch and to Wednesday, 9 February due to snow-covered pitch.

| Home team | Score | Away team |
|---|---|---|
| Aberdeen | 1–0 | Dunfermline Athletic |
| Ayr United | 1–2 | St Mirren |
| Buckie Thistle | 0–2 | Brechin City |
| Hamilton Academical | 1–3 | Dundee United |
| Inverness CT | 5–1 | Morton |
| Rangers | 2–2 | Celtic |
| Stranraer | 0–2 | Motherwell |
| St Johnstone | 2–0 | Partick Thistle |

Source: BBC Sport

=== Fifth round replays ===
| Home team | Score | Away team |
|---|---|---|
| Celtic | 1–0 | Rangerss |

Source: BBC Sport

== Quarter-finals ==
The quarter-final draw was conducted on Sunday 6 February at 2:30pm at Ibrox Stadium live on Sky Sports 2, Sky Sports HD2 & Sky 3D following the 5th round Old Firm tie. The ties were played on Saturday, 12 March and Sunday, 13 March, except for Inverness CT vs Celtic match, which was postponed to Wednesday, 16 March due to waterlogged pitch at Caledonian Stadium.

| Home team | Score | Away team |
|---|---|---|
| Brechin City | 2–2 | St Johnstone |
| Dundee United | 2–2 | Motherwell |
| Inverness CT | 1–2 | Celtic |
| St Mirren | 1–1 | Aberdeen |

Source: BBC Sport

=== Quarter-finals replays ===
| Home team | Score | Away team |
|---|---|---|
| Aberdeen | 2–1 | St Mirren |
| St Johnstone | 1–0 | Brechin City |
| Motherwell | 3–0 | Dundee United |

Source: BBC Sport

== Semi-finals ==
The semi-final draw was conducted on Monday, 14 March at Inverclyde National Sports Training Centre at 1pm live on Sky Sports News & Sky Sports News HD. The ties were played on Saturday, 16 April & Sunday, 17 April at Hampden Park.

| Home team | Score | Away team |
|---|---|---|
| Motherwell | 3–0 | St Johnstone |
| Aberdeen | 0–4 | Celtic |

Source: BBC Sport

== Final ==
21 May 2011
15:00

| Motherwell | 0–3 | Celtic |
|---|---|---|
| | Report | Ki Sung-yueng 32'; Craigan 76' (o.g.); Mulgrew 88' |

Hampden Park, Glasgow
Attendance: 49,618
Referee: Calum Murray

Source: BBC Sport

== Awards ==
The Scottish Cup Player of the Round was decided by the fans, who cast their vote to choose a winner from a list of nominations on the official Scottish Cup Facebook page.

| Round | Player of the Round | Ref |
|---|---|---|
| R4 | Chris Maguire (Aberdeen) | |
| R5 | Scott Brown (Celtic) | |
| QF | Jamie Murphy (Motherwell) | |
| SF | Jamie Murphy (Motherwell) | |
| F | Ki Sung-yueng (Celtic FC) | |

== Media coverage ==
=== UK/Ireland ===
From Round 4 onwards, selected matches from the Scottish Cup are broadcast live in the UK and Republic of Ireland by BBC Scotland and Sky Sports. BBC Scotland has the option to show one tie per round with Sky Sports showing two ties per round with one replay also. Both channels will screen the final live.

These matches were broadcast live on television.

| Round | Sky Sports | BBC Scotland |
|---|---|---|
| Fourth round | Dundee vs Motherwell; Berwick Rangers vs Celtic; Ayr United vs Hibernian (Replay) | Rangers vs Kilmarnock |
| Fifth round | Hamilton Academical vs Dundee United; Rangers vs Celtic; Celtic vs Rangers(Replay) | Aberdeen vs Dunfermline Athletic |
| Quarter-finals | Dundee United vs Motherwell; St Johnstone vs Brechin City (Replay) | St Mirren vs Aberdeen |
| Semi-finals | Motherwell vs St Johnstone; Aberdeen vs Celtic | Motherwell vs St Johnstone |
| Final | Motherwell vs Celtic | Motherwell vs Celtic |

=== Overseas ===
From Round 4 onwards, in the USA and Caribbean Premium Sports showed matches live. Setanta Sports show matches live in Australia.
