= Gavin Swankie =

Scottish footballer

Personal information
- Date of birth: 22 November 1983 (age 42)
- Place of birth: Arbroath, Scotland
- Height: 5 ft 11 in (1.80 m)
- Positions: Midfielder; forward

Senior career*
Years	Team	Apps	(Gls)
2000–2005	Arbroath	98	(7)
2005–2008	Dundee	65	(10)
2006	→ Arbroath (loan)	18	(7)
2008–2010	St Johnstone	37	(4)
2010–2012	Arbroath	70	(34)
2012–2017	Forfar Athletic	159	(41)
2017–2022	Arbroath	82	(8)
- * Club domestic league appearances and goals

Gavin Swankie (born 22 November 1983) is a Scottish retired footballer. Capable of playing in midfield and as a forward, his previous clubs include Forfar Athletic, Dundee, St Johnstone and Arbroath.

== Club career ==
Swankie signed for Dundee after his contract at Arbroath ended having come through the youth ranks at Gayfield Park. He made 73 starts for Arbroath, as well as 32 substitute appearances, scoring seven goals. He returned to Arbroath on loan in January 2006 until the end of the season and then returned to Dundee, where he featured regularly over the next two seasons.

On 1 May 2008, Swankie signed for Dundee's Tayside rivals St Johnstone. He was released at the end of the 2009–10 season.

Swankie then signed for a third spell at Arbroath. He won the PFA Scotland Players' Player of the Year and Scottish Football League Player of the Year awards for the Third Division in the 2010–11 campaign, and his goals helped Arbroath win their first senior league championship.

Swankie signed for Forfar Athletic in the 2012 summer transfer window. On 3 August 2013, he was the hero for Forfar Athletic when his two goals helped beat Rangers 2–1 in the Scottish League Cup at Station Park. This was Forfar's first victory against Rangers.

In July 2017, with one-year left on his contract, Swankie was placed on the transfer list by Forfar after he had intimated that he wished to leave the club, and on 4 July 2017, he signed with former club Arbroath for a fee of £8,000.

== Career statistics ==
As of match played 18 January 2020

Appearances and goals by club, season and competition
Club	Season	League			Scottish Cup		League Cup		Other		Total	
Club	Season	Division	Apps	Goals	Apps	Goals	Apps	Goals	Apps	Goals	Apps	Goals
Arbroath	2000–01	Scottish Second Division	1	0	0	0	0	0	0	0	1	0
Arbroath	2001–02	Scottish First Division	8	0	1	0	0	0	0	0	9	0
Arbroath	2002–03	Scottish First Division	29	2	1	0	0	0	0	0	30	2
Arbroath	2003–04	Scottish Second Division	30	0	2	0	2	0	1 (Note: Appearances in the Scottish Challenge Cup)	0	35	0
Arbroath	2004–05	Scottish Second Division	34	4	2	0	1	0	1	0	38	4
Arbroath	Total		102	6	6	0	3	0	2	0	113	6
Dundee	2005–06	Scottish First Division	2	0	0	0	0	0	1	0	3	0
Dundee	2006–07	Scottish First Division	33	7	2	0	1	1	1	1	37	9
Dundee	2007–08	Scottish First Division	30	3	1	0	3	1	0	0	34	4
Dundee	Total		65	10	3	0	4	2	2	1	74	13
Arbroath (loan)	2005–06	Scottish Third Division	18	7	0	0	0	0	2 (Note: Appearances in the Second Division play-offs)	0	20	7
St Johnstone	2008–09	Scottish First Division	27	4	1	0	2	0	1	0	31	4
St Johnstone	2009–10	Scottish Premier League	10	0	1	0	2	1	—		13	1
St Johnstone	Total		37	4	2	0	4	1	1	0	44	5
Arbroath	2010–11	Scottish Third Division	36	23	2	0	1	1	1	0	40	24
Arbroath	2011–12	Scottish Second Division	34	11	2	0	0	0	2 (Note: One appearance in the Scottish Challenge Cup; One appearance in the First Division play-offs)	0	38	11
Arbroath	Total		70	34	4	0	1	1	3	0	78	35
Forfar Athletic	2012–13	Scottish Second Division	32	10	4	2	1	0	4 (Note: Two appearances and two goals in the Scottish Challenge Cup; two appearances in the First Division play-offs)	2	41	14
Forfar Athletic	2013–14	Scottish League One	29	11	4	0	2	2	2	0	37	13
Forfar Athletic	2014–15	Scottish League One	34	11	1	0	1	0	4 (Note: One appearance in the Scottish Challenge Cup; three appearances and two goals in the Championship play-offs)	2	40	13
Forfar Athletic	2015–16	Scottish League One	32	3	4	1	1	0	2	0	39	4
Forfar Athletic	2016–17	Scottish League Two	32	6	2	0	4	0	6 (Note: Three appearances in the Scottish Challenge Cup; three appearances and two goals in the League One play-offs)	2	44	8
Forfar Athletic	Total		159	41	15	3	9	2	18	6	201	52
Arbroath	2017–18	Scottish League One	30	5	1	0	2	0	3 (Note: One appearance in the Scottish Challenge Cup; two appearances and one goal in the Championship play-offs)	1	36	6
Arbroath	2018–19	Scottish League One	36	3	0	0	4	0	1	0	41	3
Arbroath	2019–20	Scottish Championship	2	0	1	0	3	0	0	0	6	0
Arbroath	Total		68	8	2	0	9	0	4	1	83	9
Career total			519	110	32	3	30	6	32	8	613	127
