= Darren Hill (footballer) =

Scottish footballer (born 1981)

Personal information
- Date of birth: 3 December 1981 (age 44)
- Place of birth: Falkirk, Scotland
- Height: 1.88 m (6 ft 2 in)
- Position: Goalkeeper

Senior career*
Years	Team	Apps	(Gls)
1998–2006	Falkirk	40	(0)
2007–2008	East Stirlingshire	14	(0)
2008–2013	Arbroath	163	(0)
2013–2014	Forfar Athletic	35	(0)
2014–2015	Hamilton Academical	0	(0)
2015–2016	Forfar Athletic	17	(0)
2016–2018	Linlithgow Rose		
2018–2019	Arbroath	1	(0)
2019–2021	Cumbernauld United		
2021–2023	Syngenta		
- * Club domestic league appearances and goals

Darren Hill (born 3 December 1981) is a Scottish former footballer who played as a goalkeeper. Hill has played for Falkirk, East Stirlingshire, Hamilton Academical, Linlithgow Rose and Arbroath, as well as two spells with Forfar Athletic.

== Career ==
Hill has played for Falkirk, East Stirlingshire, Arbroath, Forfar Athletic and Hamilton Academical. He left Hamilton by mutual consent in December 2015. In December 2015, Hill became new Forfar manager Gary Bollan's first signing, returning to Station Park on an 18-month contract. After 6 months with Forfar, Hill signed for SJFA East Superleague side Linlithgow Rose.
