= Craig Malcolm =

Scottish footballer and manager

Personal information
- Date of birth: 30 December 1986 (age 39)
- Place of birth: Bellshill, Scotland
- Height: 5 ft 10 in (1.78 m)
- Position: Striker

Team information
- Current team: Dumbarton (Assistant Head Coach)

Senior career*
| Years | Team | Apps | (Gls) |
| 2003–2005 | Raith Rovers | 15 | (1) |
| 2005–2010 | Arthurlie | | |
| 2010–2013 | Stranraer | 105 | (47) |
| 2013–2014 | Ayr United | 33 | (8) |
| 2014–2017 | Stranraer | 95 | (35) |
| 2017–2018 | Alloa Athletic | 20 | (2) |
| 2018 | → East Kilbride (loan) | | |
| 2018–2022 | East Kilbride | | |
| 2022 | St Roch's | | |
| 2022–2023 | Stranraer | 14 | (1) |
| 2023–2024 | St Cadoc's | | |
| 2024 | Cumbernauld Colts | | |

Managerial career
- 2020: East Kilbride (interim)
- 2024: Cumbernauld Colts (head coach)
- 2026-: Dumbarton (assistant head coach)
- * Club domestic league appearances and goals as of 15:00, 4 December 2024 (UTC)

Craig Malcolm (born 30 December 1986) is a former Scottish footballer and coach who played as a striker. He is currently assistant head coach at Scottish League Two side Dumbarton. Malcolm previously worked as head coach for Lowland League West club Cumbernauld Colts.

During his career, Malcolm has played for Raith Rovers, Arthurlie, Ayr United, Alloa Athletic, Stranraer and East Kilbride.

== Career ==
After leaving Raith Rovers following an unsuccessful two years at the club, Malcolm joined Junior club, Arthurlie. In 2010, Malcolm moved to Third Division club, Stranraer. While in his three years at Stair Park, he notched up a total of 48 goals in 112 games in all-competitions.

Following the 2011–12 season, Stranraer were promoted to Second Division, despite losing in the play-off final to Albion Rovers as a result of Rangers' liquidation, Malcolm was Stranraer's top scorer in both the league and all competitions throughout the campaign. In the next season, Malcolm played an integral part in Stranraer staying up, scoring two goals against Stenhousemuir, that secured their safety, as well as bagging a total of 19 goals in all competitions, 18 of those in the league.

In 2013, Malcolm signed for Ayr United. After one season there he returned to Stranraer. Malcolm spent a further three seasons with Stranraer, before leaving the club in May 2017. Malcolm subsequently signed for fellow Scottish League One club Alloa Athletic on 31 May 2017. He joined Lowland League club East Kilbride on loan from Alloa in January 2018 and after moving permanently the following June was subsequently named East Kilbride's captain. In February 2020, Malcolm and teammate David Proctor took interim charge of the team after the departure of previous interim manager Jim Paterson.

East Kilbride announced that Malcolm had left the club on 12 January 2022. He finished the season with West of Scotland Football League side St Roch's before returning for a third spell with Stranraer in the summer of 2022. Malcolm signed with St Cadoc's in 2023 taking up a player/coach role.

Malcolm would return to the Lowland League in 2024 as a player, moving to Cumbernauld Colts. He would take up the role as interim head coach of the Colts after the departure of former East Kilbride teammate David Proctor on 19 October 2024. He was appointed permanent head coach at the club on 4 December 2024.

In November 2026, Malcolm was appointed assistant head coach at Dumbarton - working alongside Martin Fellowes, who had previously worked with him at East Kilbride and St Cadoc's.

== Personal life ==
Outside of football, Malcolm worked as a heating and refrigerator engineer.

== Honours ==
East Kilbride

- Lowland Football League: 2018–19
- SFA South Region Challenge Cup: 2018–19
