= 2010–11 Scottish League Cup =

2010–11 Co-operative Insurance Cup
Tournament details
- Country: Scotland
- Dates: 31 July 2010 – 20 March 2011
- Teams: 42

Final positions
- Champions: Rangers
- Runners-up: Celtic

Tournament statistics
- Matches played: 41
- Goals scored: 171 (4.17 per match)

Awards
- Best player: Anthony Stokes (5)

The 2010–11 Scottish League Cup is the 65th season of Scotland's second-most prestigious football knockout competition, the Scottish League Cup, also known as the Co-operative Insurance Cup for sponsorship reasons. The competition started in July 2010 with the First Round and ended in Spring 2011 with the Final. Rangers are the current title holder, having beaten Celtic in the 2011 final.

== Format ==
The competition is a single elimination knock-out competition. In each round, fixtures are determined by random draw. Fixtures are played to a finish, with extra time and then penalties used in the event of ties. The competition is open to all clubs in the Scottish Premier League and Scottish Football League. Clubs involved in European competitions are given a bye to the third round to avoid congestion of fixtures.

- First round: The 30 teams from the previous season's Scottish Football League enter
- Second round: The 15 winners of the First Round are joined by the 7 of last season's SPL sides not in Europe (Heart of Midlothian, St Johnstone, Aberdeen, Hamilton Academical, St Mirren, Kilmarnock and Falkirk) who were relegated from the SPL
- Third round: The 11 winners of the Second Round are joined by the 5 SPL sides in Europe (Rangers, Celtic, Dundee United, Hibernian, Motherwell)
- Quarter-finals: The 8 winners of the third round play
- Semi-finals: The 4 winners of the quarter-finals play
- Final: The 2 winners of the semi-finals play

== Adjustments from previous editions ==
Club Entry Points – The format of the first and second rounds was adjusted for this season. Previously the club promoted into the SPL entered in the Second Round alongside the other non-European SPL sides, with the side relegated to the First Division entering in the first round alongside the other SFL sides. However, this situation has been reversed, meaning Inverness Caledonian Thistle entered the tournament in the First Round – despite being promoted to SPL; and Falkirk entered in the second round – despite being relegated.

The 2009–10 tournament had seen both such sides enter in the first round, plus 11th in the SPL – as there were 6 Scottish clubs in Europe.

Unless a Scottish side wins the Europa League or unless the country secures one of the three "Fair Play" places, there will only be 4 clubs in Europe during 2011–12. As a result, both such sides plus 2nd in the First Division entered in the second round.

Semi-Finals – Following discussions between the SPL and SFL, it was agreed that one or both semi-finals would take place on a weekend, and not on midweek as in previous years. This practice had been the source of criticism – as it forced fans to travel to a neutral venue for a prestigious Semi-Final on a weekday evening in January or February. The details will be confirmed after the quarter-finals.

== Schedule ==
Round	First match date	Fixtures	Clubs
First round	Saturday/Sunday 31 July/1 August 2010	15	42 → 27
Second round	Tuesday/Wednesday 24/25 August 2010	11	27 → 16
Third round	Tuesday/Wednesday 21/22 September 2010	8	16 → 8
Quarter-finals	Tuesday/Wednesday 26/27 October 2010	4	8 → 4
Semi-finals	Saturday/Sunday 29/30 January 2011	2	4 → 2
Final	Sunday 20 March 2011	1	2 → 1

== Fixtures and results ==
=== First round ===
The First round draw was conducted on 28 May 2010.

Home team	Score	Away team
Dundee	3–0	Montrose
Elgin City	3–2 (a.e.t.)	Ayr United
Dunfermline Athletic	5–2	Arbroath
Annan Athletic	0–1	Partick Thistle
Stirling Albion	1–2	Forfar Athletic
Albion Rovers	0–1	Airdrie United
Ross County	2–1	Livingston
Stenhousemuir	1–3	Brechin City
Raith Rovers	4–1	East Fife
Clyde	2–1	Cowdenbeath
Peterhead	1–0	Berwick Rangers
Stranraer	1–7	Greenock Morton
Queen of the South	5–1	Dumbarton
Inverness Caledonian Thistle	3–0	Queen's Park
East Stirlingshire	1–2	Alloa Athletic

=== Second round ===
The Second round draw was conducted on 6 August 2010.

Home team	Score	Away team
Kilmarnock	6–2	Airdrie United
Brechin City	2–2 (a.e.t.); 3–1 (pen.)	Dundee
Heart of Midlothian	4–0	Elgin City
Alloa Athletic	0–3	Aberdeen
St Johnstone	2–0	Greenock Morton
Ross County	3–3 (a.e.t.); 4–3 (pen.)	St Mirren
Inverness Caledonian Thistle	3–0	Peterhead
Partick Thistle	0–1	Falkirk
Queen of the South	4–1	Forfar Athletic
Raith Rovers	1–0	Hamilton Academical
Dunfermline Athletic	3–2	Clyde

=== Third round ===
The Third round draw was conducted on 31 August 2010.

Home team	Score	Away team
Rangers	7–2	Dunfermline Athletic
Kilmarnock	3–1	Hibernian
Aberdeen	3–2	Raith Rovers
Falkirk	4–3	Heart of Midlothian
Celtic	6–0	Inverness Caledonian Thistle
Ross County	1–2 (a.e.t.)	Dundee United
St Johnstone	3–0	Queen of the South
Brechin City	0–2	Motherwell

=== Quarter-finals ===
The Quarter-finals draw was conducted on 23 September 2010. Ties were played on 26 and 27 October.

26 October 2010
19:45

Aberdeen	2–1	Falkirk
Hartley 64', 90+5'	Report	Khalis 33'

Pittodrie Stadium, Aberdeen
Attendance: 6,710
Referee: Stevie O'Reilly

26 October 2010
19:45

Motherwell	1–0	Dundee United
Gow 86'	Report

Fir Park, Motherwell
Attendance: 4,838
Referee: William Collum

27 October 2010
19:30

St Johnstone	2–3	Celtic
Parkin 31'; Davidson 54'	Report	Stokes 8', 13'; McGinn 12'

McDiarmid Park, Perth
Attendance: 5,151
Referee: Craig Thomson

27 October 2010
19:45

Kilmarnock	0–2	Rangers
	Report	Little 25'; Naismith 61'

Rugby Park, Kilmarnock
Attendance: 7,561
Referee: Mike Tumilty

=== Semi-finals ===
The Semi-finals draw was conducted on 29 October 2010.

29 January 2011
15:00

Aberdeen	1–4	Celtic
Vernon 61'	Report	Commons 6'; Mulgrew 10'; Rogne 21'; Stokes 34' (pen.)

Hampden Park, Glasgow
Attendance: 38,085
Referee: Craig Thomson

30 January 2011
15:00

Rangers	2–1	Motherwell
Edu 20'; Naismith 75'	Report	Lasley 66'

Hampden Park, Glasgow
Attendance: 23,432
Referee: William Collum

=== Final ===
20 March 2011
15:00
Final

Rangers	2–1 (a.e.t.)	Celtic
Davis 24'; Jelavić 98'	Report	Ledley 31'

Hampden Park, Glasgow
Attendance: 51,181
Referee: Craig Thomson

== Awards ==
A team, player and young player were chosen by the Scottish sports press as the top performers in each round.

Round	Team	Player	Young player	Ref
R1	Greenock Morton	Stewart Kean (Greenock Morton)	Marc McCusker (Clyde)	
R2	Brechin City	Gregory Tade (Raith Rovers)	Ryan Flynn (Falkirk)	
R3			Jonathan Page (Motherwell)	
QF		Paul Hartley (Aberdeen)		
SF				
