= Darren Gribben =

Scottish footballer

Personal information
- Date of birth: 27 March 1986 (age 40)
- Place of birth: Scotland
- Height: 1.80 m (5 ft 11 in)
- Position: Striker

Team information
- Current team: Camelon Juniors

Senior career*
Years	Team	Apps	(Gls)
2003–2004	Hamilton Academical	22	(2)
2004–2005	Cowdenbeath	34	(12)
2005–2007	Forfar Athletic	54	(21)
2007–2008	Stirling Albion	3	(0)
2007–2008	→ Brechin City (loan)	8	(2)
2008	Stranraer	9	(0)
2008–2009	Berwick Rangers	34	(14)
2009	Dumbarton	0	(0)
2009–2010	Bo'ness United		
2010–2012	Berwick Rangers	58	(27)
2012	Arbroath	1	(1)
2013	Stranraer		
2013-2016	Bo'ness United		
2016	Arthurlie		
2016-2017	Broxburn Athletic		
2017-2019	Fauldhouse United		
2019-2020	Livingston United		
2020-2021	Blackburn United		
2021-	Camelon Juniors		
- * Club domestic league appearances and goals as of 14 August 2012

Darren Gribben (born 27 March 1986) is a Scottish semi-professional footballer who plays as a striker for Camelon Juniors.

Gribben has played for Hamilton Academical, Cowdenbeath, Forfar Athletic, Stirling Albion, Brechin City, Stranraer, Berwick Rangers, Dumbarton, Bo'ness United and Arbroath.

== Career ==
Gribben broke into Hamilton Academical's first team at the age of 16, making his debut in the Scottish Football League in January 2003 in a match against Stenhousemuir. Gribben was released by the club in August 2004, and he later signed with Cowdenbeath, where he was named the Scottish Football League's Young Player of the Month in January 2012. He joined Forfar Athletic in September 2005, 2007, before being released in April 2007. In May 2007, Gribben was targeted by Elgin City, but signed for Stirling Albion in June 2007, before moving to Berwick Rangers in May 2008. Gribben joined Dumbarton in June 2009, but never appeared for the club, and joined Bo'ness in August 2009. After rejoining Berwick, Gribben spoke publicly about his strike partnership with Craig O'Reilly in September 2010. In July 2011, while still contracted with Berwick, Gribben went on trial with first club Hamilton. In July 2012, Gribben signed for Arbroath alongside Kieran Brennan.

He was released by Arbroath, April 2013, and returned to Stranraer.

== Junior football ==
By 2016, he was playing for Arthurlie. In 2017, he represented Broxburn Athletic. He later signed for Fauldhouse United.
