= Borough Briggs =

Football stadium in Elgin, Scotland

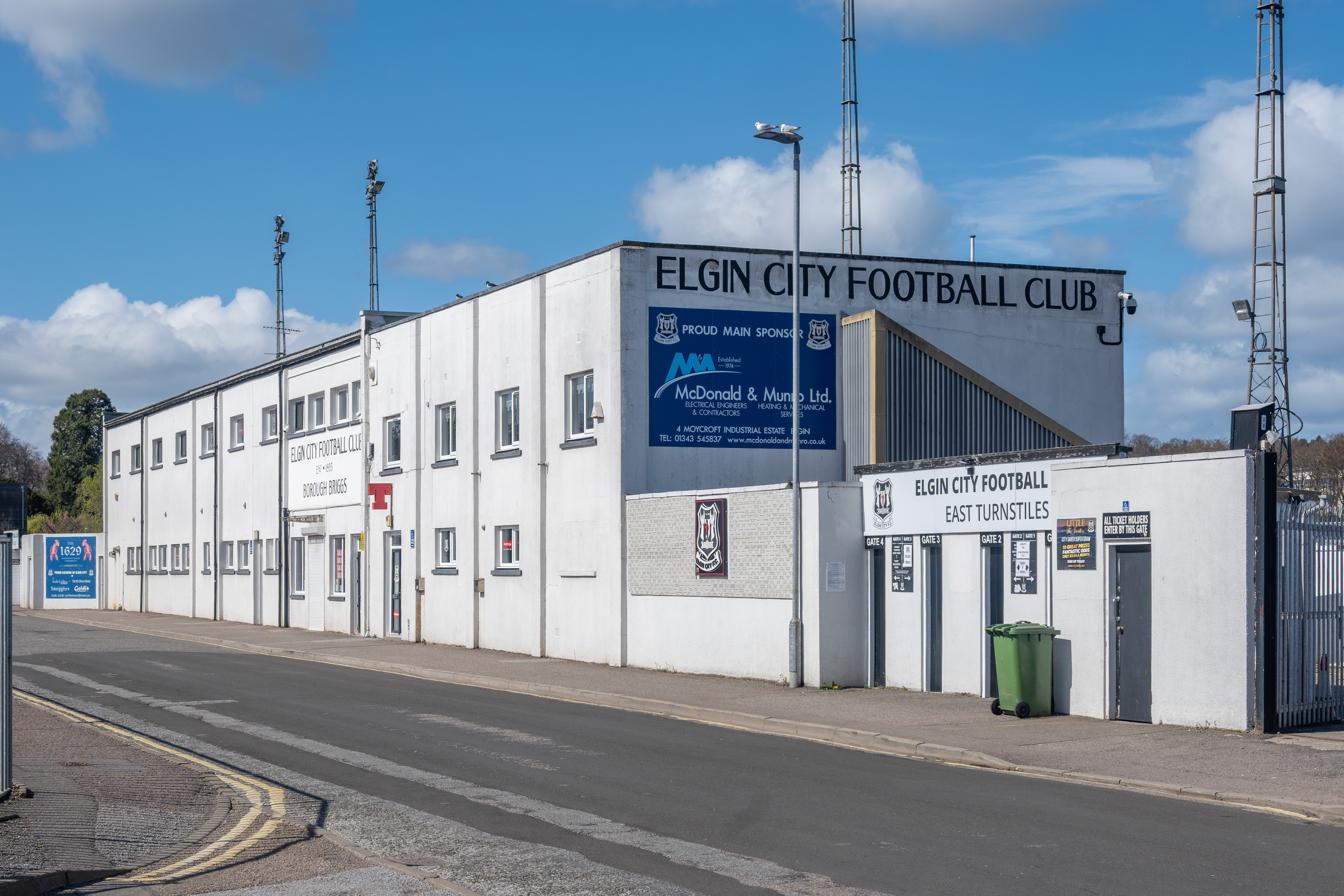

- Location in Moray
- Location: Elgin, Moray
- Coordinates: 57°39′07″N 3°19′15″W
- Owner: Elgin City F.C.
- Capacity: 4,520 (478 seated)
- Surface: Grass

Construction
- Opened: 1921

Tenant
- Elgin City F.C.

Borough Briggs is a football ground in Elgin, Moray, Scotland. This venue is the home ground of Elgin City who currently play in Scottish League Two. Borough Briggs opened on 20 August 1921 when Inverness Citadel were the visitors in a Highland League fixture, which Elgin won 3–0. The first player to score at the ground was City centre-half Willie Raitt after 20 minutes of the first-half at the Lossie Green end, other scorers were Alf Mitchell and Charlie Taylor. The new ground replaced Elgin's temporary ground from 1919 to 1921 at Cooper Park.

It has a capacity of 4,520; 478 seated. All 478 seats in the main stand were formerly fixed at Newcastle United's St James' Park ground. When Elgin City were elected to the Scottish Football League in 2000 they obtained 500 seats from the Geordie club when it was revamping the seated areas in its main (Milburn) stand.

== Gallery ==
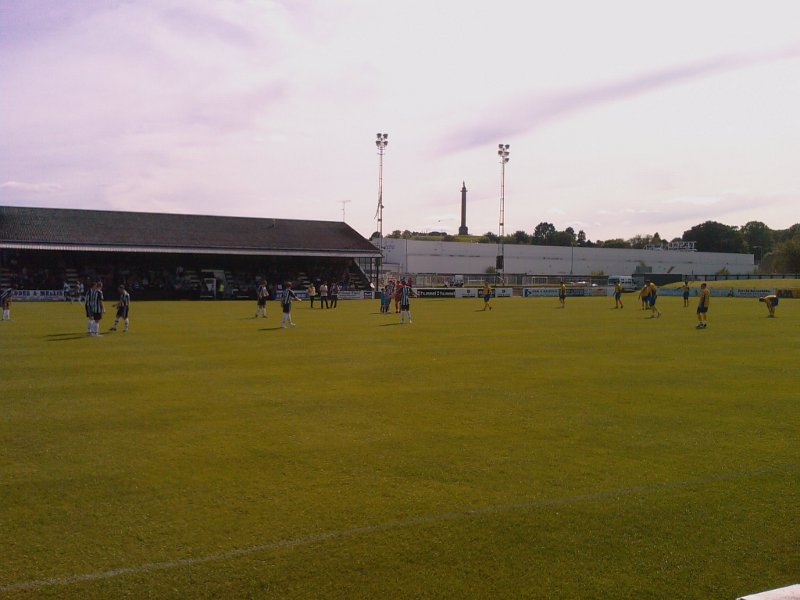
Main Stand

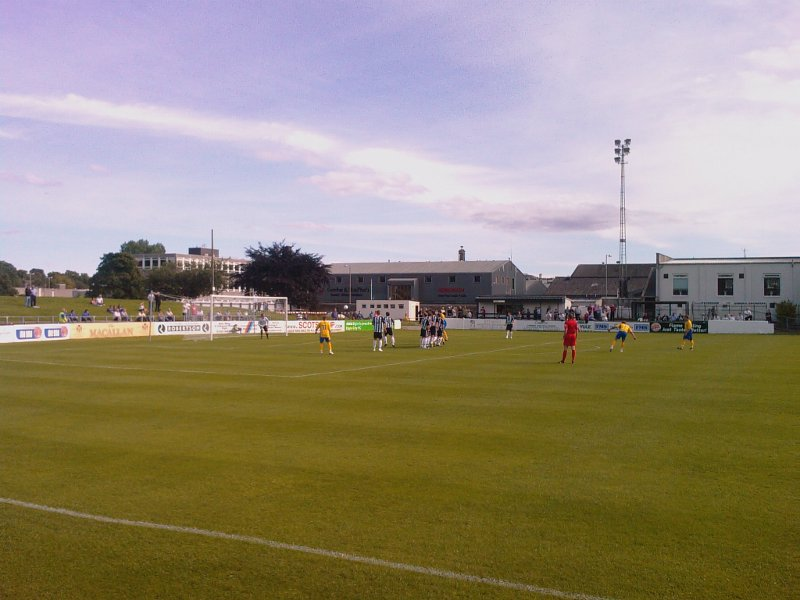
The Bank

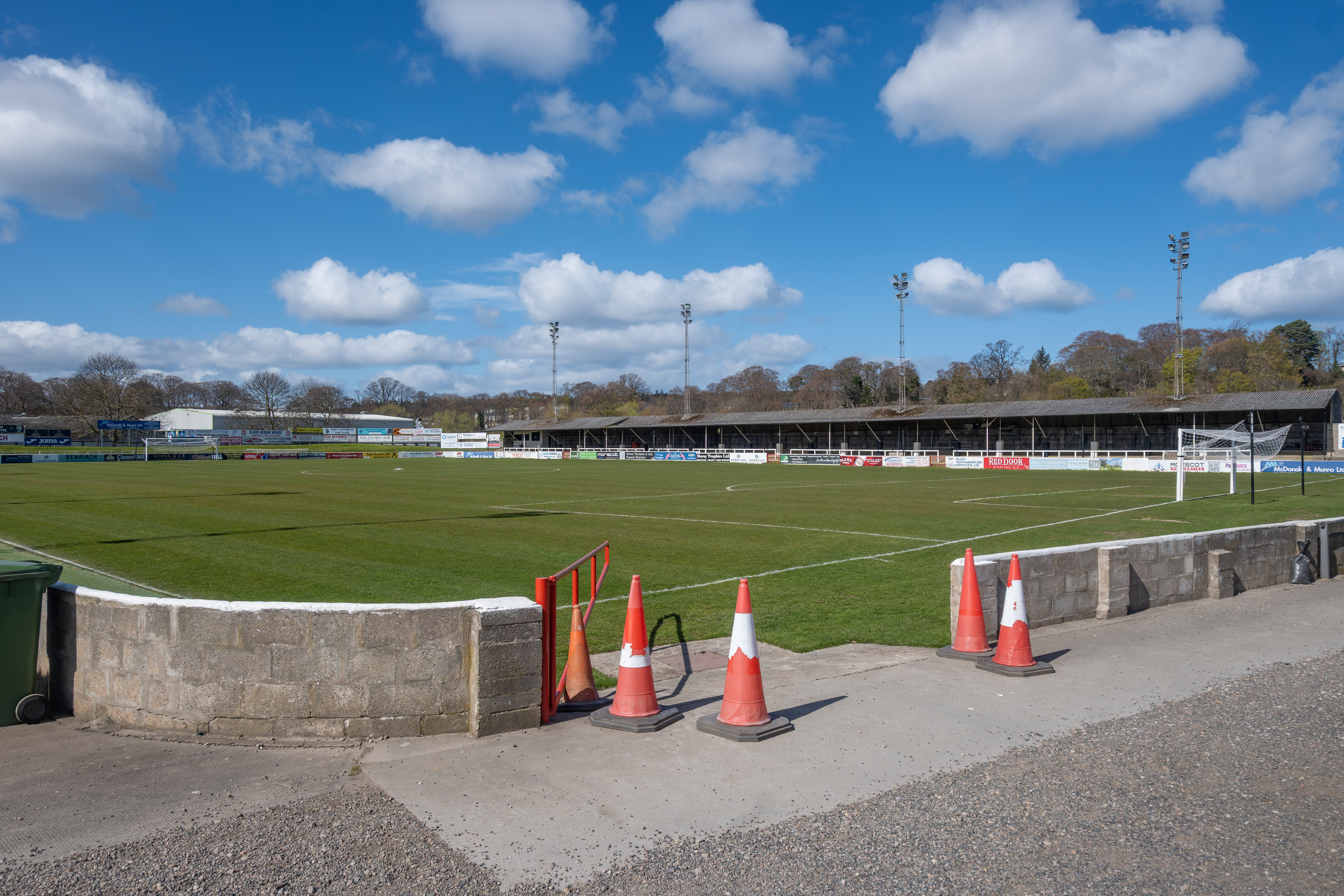
The pitch
