= Ian Harty =

Scottish footballer

Personal information
- Full name: Ian McGuinness Harty
- Date of birth: 8 April 1978 (age 48)
- Place of birth: Bellshill, Scotland
- Position: Striker

Youth career
- 1995–1996: Heart of Midlothian

Senior career*
Years	Team	Apps	(Gls)
1996–1998	Albion Rovers	19	(2)
1998–2003	Stranraer	168	(68)
2003–2005	Clyde	75	(34)
2005–2006	Hamilton Academical	0	(0)
2006	Stranraer	4	(0)
2006–2007	Raith Rovers	11	(4)
2007	Stirling Albion	1	(0)
2007	Airdrie United	10	(5)
2007–2008	Darlington	1	(0)
2008	Stenhousemuir	8	(4)
2008–2009	Stirling Albion	13	(3)
2009	Albion Rovers	15	(5)
2009–2010	Brechin City	7	(1)
2009–2010	→ Forfar Athletic (loan)	26	(10)
2010–2012	Annan Athletic	44	(18)
- * Club domestic league appearances and goals as of 28 December 2011

Ian McGuinness Harty (born 8 April 1978 in Bellshill) is a Scottish footballer. He played for a wide number of lower Scottish Football League teams during his career. His longest spell was with one club was with Stranraer allowing him to notch his highest goals tally with one club. He also transferred from Airdrie United down south of the border to join English side Darlington, however he only made two substitute appearances during his five months in England.

== See also ==
- 2004–05 Clyde F.C. season
