= Armand Oné =

French footballer (born 1983)

Personal information
- Date of birth: 15 March 1983 (age 43)
- Place of birth: Paris, France
- Position: Forward

Senior career*
| Years | Team | Apps | (Gls) |
| 1999–2001 | Nantes B | | |
| 2001–2002 | Cambridge United | 32 | (4) |
| 2002 | → Northampton Town (loan) | 6 | (1) |
| 2003 | Wrexham | 3 | (0) |
| 2003 | Tamworth | 4 | (0) |
| 2004–2005 | Partick Thistle | 27 | (6) |
| 2006 | Cowdenbeath | 11 | (8) |
| 2006–2007 | Raith Rovers | 21 | (4) |
| 2007–2009 | TPS Turku | 32 | (11) |
| 2009 | Livingston | 16 | (3) |
| 2009 | Gateshead | 12 | (0) |
| 2010–2011 | Stranraer | 54 | (25) |
| 2011–2012 | Alloa Athletic | 14 | (1) |
| 2012–2013 | Stranraer | 16 | (1) |
| Total | | 248 | (64) |
- * Club domestic league appearances and goals

Armand Oné (born 15 March 1983) is a French former professional footballer. A forward, he played for clubs in Scotland, France, England, Finland and Wales.

== Career ==
Oné played for Nantes, and after a one-month trial in Manchester United, he was not signed and then join Cambridge United, Northampton Town (loan, scoring once against Colchester United), Wrexham, Tamworth, Partick Thistle and Cowdenbeath (where he scored the winning goal to secure the league championship in a 2–1 victory over Elgin City) before joining Raith Rovers in the summer of 2006 for one year. In late March 2007, Oné left Raith and moved to Finnish side TPS after a successful trial he made his debut for the Finnish club at home in a 0–0 draw against IFK Mariehamn.

Oné played a trial match on 24 January 2009 for Livingston against Greenock Morton. He subsequently signed for the club on an 18-month contract on 27 January 2009.

Following Livingston's demotion to the Scottish Third Division, Oné had his contract terminated by the club on 31 August 2009. He signed for Gateshead in a four-month deal the following day. Gateshead announced on 25 November 2009 that they would release Oné after their game against Crawley Town three days later. It was announced on Stranraer's official club website on 7 January 2010 that he had recently agreed to sign for the club; the length of the deal was not disclosed.

Oné made his first appearance for Stranraer in a dramatic 5–4 away win at Montrose, scoring two goals to mark his debut for the club.

Oné left Stranraer after in the summer of 2011 after failing to respond to a contract offer from the Third Division club. A statement released to the Scottish Football League said that Oné would not be returning to the club.

On 16 June 2011, Oné joined Alloa Athletic on a one-year contract.

Oné made his first appearance in a friendly against Falkirk FC, where he scored an own goal. On 13 August 2011, he came on as a substitute in a 2–2 draw against Clyde.

Oné was released from his contract on 8 March 2012 having only scored one goal for 'The Wasps', in a game against Peterhead on 12 November 2011.

== Personal life ==
Born in France, Oné is of Ivorian descent. He is the cousin of footballer Grégory Tadé who also played in Scotland.

His son Ryan is also a footballer who began his professional career with Hamilton Academical in 2022. On 1 September 2023, Ryan signed for Sheffield United.

== Honours ==
Cambridge United

- Football League Trophy runner-up: 2001–02

Alloa

- Scottish Third Division: 2011–12

Cowdenbeath

- Scottish Third Division: 2005–06

Livingston

- Scottish Third Division: 2009–10
