= 2011–12 Airdrie United F.C. season =

Airdrie United
2011–12 season
- Chairman: Jim Ballantyne
- Manager: Jimmy Boyle
- Stadium: Excelsior Stadium
- Scottish Second Division: Fourth place
- Challenge Cup: First round lost to Livingston
- League Cup: Third round, lost to Dundee United
- Scottish Cup: Fourth round, lost to Dundee United
- Top goalscorer: League: Ryan Donnelly (21); All: Ryan Donnelly (27)
- Highest home attendance: 1,368 vs. Albion Rovers, 10 September 2011
- Lowest home attendance: 621 vs. Forfar Athletic, 17 March 2012

The 2011–12 season will be Airdrie United's second consecutive season in the Scottish Second Division, having been relegated from the Scottish First Division at the end of the 2009–10 season. They will also compete in the Challenge Cup, League Cup and the Scottish Cup.

== Summary ==
Airdrie finished fourth in the Second Division, entering the play-offs losing 6–2 to Dumbarton on aggregate in the final and remained in the Second Division. They reached the first round of the Challenge Cup, the third round of the League Cup and the fourth round of the Scottish Cup.

== League table ==
Pos	Team	Pld	W	D	L	GF	GA	GD	Pts	Promotion, qualification or relegation
2	Arbroath	36	17	12	7	76	51	+25	63	Qualification for the First Division play-offs
3	Dumbarton (O, P)	36	17	7	12	61	61	0	58 (Note: Dumbarton won the First Division play-off final, and were promoted to the First Division.)	Qualification for the First Division play-offs
4	Airdrie United (P)	36	14	10	12	68	60	+8	52 (Note: Airdrie United lost the final of the First Division playoffs to Dumbarton. However following the demotion of Rangers to the third division prior to the beginning of the 2012-13 season, Dundee were promoted from the First Division to the SPL, and Airdrie United were promoted to the First Division to take their place. Stranraer were promoted from the Third to the Second Division to take the place of Airdrie United)	Qualification for the First Division play-offs
5	Stenhousemuir	36	15	6	15	54	49	+5	51	
6	East Fife	36	14	6	16	55	57	−2	48	

Source: SPFL Archive
Rules for classification: 1) points; 2) goal difference; 3) number of goals scored.
(O) Play-off winners; (P) Promoted

== Results and fixtures ==
Win Draw Loss Postponed

=== Second Division ===
6 August 2011 Second Division	Airdrie United	3–0	Dumbarton	Excelsior Stadium
	Johnston 6', 63'; Donnelly 9'	BBC Report		Attendance: 887; Referee: Norcroft

13 August 2011 Second Division	East Fife	2–0	Airdrie United	Bayview Stadium
	Johnstone 36'; Linn 64'; Muir (red card) 71'	BBC Sport		Attendance: 759; Referee: McDermott

20 August 2011 Second Division	Airdrie United	1–5	Cowdenbeath	Excelsior Stadium
	Donnelly 6'	BBC Report	Robertson 37'; Linton 45', 67'; Coult 50'; Morton 78'	Attendance: 834; Referee: Charleston

27 August 2011 Second Division	Forfar Athletic	3–2	Airdrie United	Station Park
	Crawford 11', 43'; Fotheringham 64'	BBC Sport	Stephenson 23'; Lynch 29'	Attendance: 432; Referee: Beaton

10 September 2011 Second Division	Airdrie United	4–0	Albion Rovers	Excelsior Stadium
15:00	Lynch 9'; Donnelly 11', 45'; Stevenson 41' (pen.)	BBC Report	Donnelly (red card) 80'	Attendance: 1,368; Referee: Tumilty

17 September 2011 Second Division	Arbroath	3–1	Airdrie United	Gayfield Park
	McAnespie 6'; Doris 63'; Swankie 90'	BBC Sport	Owens 65'	Attendance: 761; Referee: Colvin

24 September 2011 Second Division	Airdrie United	1–1	Stirling Albion	Excelsior Stadium
	Boyle 4'	BBC Report	Davieson 37'	Attendance: 709; Referee: Roache

1 October 2011 Second Division	Airdrie United	5–2	Stenhousemuir	Excelsior Stadium
	Donnelly 10', 66'; Lovering 27'; Boyle 45'; Blockley 83'; Lilley (red card) 90'	BBC Report	Hamilton 51'; Kean 56'	Attendance: 698; Referee: Muir

15 October 2011 Second Division	Brechin City	1–1	Airdrie United	Glebe Park
15:00	King 51' (Penalty)	SFL Report	Donnelly 14' Stallard (red card) 24'	Attendance: 455; Referee: Clancy

22 October 2011 Second Division	Dumbarton	1–1	Airdrie United	Strathclyde Homes Stadium
15:00	Gilhaney 29' (pen.)	SFL Report	Stevenson 37'; Green (red card) 39'	Attendance: 285; Referee: Somers

29 October 2011 Second Division	Airdrie United	1–3	East Fife	Excelsior Stadium
15:00	Donnelly 74'; Lovering (red card) 82'	SFL Report	Wallace 34'; Johnstone 81'; Linn 85'	Attendance: 849; Referee: McDermott

5 November 2011 Second Division	Albion Rovers	7–2	Airdrie United	Cliftonhill
	Chaplain 13', 29', 88'; O'Byrne 36', 90'; Gemmell 56', 61'	SFL Report	Stevenson 23'; Owens 74' (pen.); Lilley (red card) 76'	Attendance: 1,109; Referee: Somers

12 November 2011 Second Division	Airdrie United	4–4	Forfar Athletic	Excelsior Stadium
	Donnelly 32', 58', 73'; Boyle 82'	BBC Report	Templeman 17', 64'; Motion 62'; Byers 79'	Attendance: 635; Referee: Winter

26 November 2011 Second Division	Airdrie United	3–3	Arbroath	Excelsior Stadium
	Lovering 6' (Penalty); Donnelly 68', 71'	BBC Report	Swankie 2'; Doris 42' (Penalty); Falkingham 56'	Attendance: 687; Referee: Richmond

3 December 2011 Second Division	Stirling Albion	1–4	Airdrie United	Doubletree Dunblane Stadium
15:00	Bonar 45'	SFL Report	Donnelly 13', 58'; Lovering 29' (Penalty); McLaren 49'	Attendance: 711; Referee: Beaton

10 December 2011 Second Division	Stenhousemuir	1–1	Airdrie United	Ochilview Park
15:00	Rodgers 4'	SFL Report	McLaren 69'	Attendance: 698; Referee: Northcroft

17 December 2011 Second Division	Airdrie United	2–3	Brechin City	Excelsior Stadium
15:00	Devlin (red card) 51'; Donnelly 69', 83'	SFL Report	Lister 34'; McManus 79'; McKenna 82'	Attendance: 643; Referee: Clancy

26 December 2011 Second Division	Forfar Athletic	2–3	Airdrie United	Station Park
14:00	Templeman 15'; Motion 18'; Hegarty (red card) 67'	SFL Report	Lynch 42'; McLaren 45'; Morton 90'	Attendance: 579; Referee: Clancy

2 January 2012 Second Division	Airdrie United	1–0	Albion Rovers	Excelsior Stadium
15:00	Stevenson 71'	SFL Report		Attendance: 1,490; Referee: Conroy

14 January 2012 Second Division	Cowdenbeath	2–0	Airdrie United	Central Park
	Ramsay 37'; McKenzie 58' (pen.)	SFL Report		Attendance: 408; Referee: Richmond

21 January 2012 Second Division	Airdrie United	2–3	Dumbarton	Excelsior Stadium
15:00	Donnelly 15'; Boyle 36'; MacDonald (red card) 48'	SFL Report	Lithgow 34'; Agnew 67'; Walker 88'	Attendance: 743; Referee: Northcroft

28 January 2012 Second Division	Airdrie United	4–1	Stirling Albion	Excelsior Stadium
15:00	Boyle 3'; Lovering 17'; McLaren 73'; Sally 84'	SFL Report	Allison (yellow card) 90' (red card); Weir 90'	Attendance: 730; Referee: Hilland

4 February 2012 Second Division	Arbroath	P – P	Airdrie United	Gayfield Park
15:00

11 February 2012 Second Division	Brechin City	1–1	Airdrie United	Glebe Park
15:00	McManus 26'; Molloy (yellow card) 79' (red card)	SFL Report	Holmes 72'	Attendance: 483; Referee: Roache

18 February 2012 Second Division	Airdrie United	0–3	Stenhousemuir	Excelsior Stadium
15:00		SFL Report	Dickson 4'; Smith 45', 66'	Attendance: 685; Referee: Tumilty

25 February 2012 Second Division	East Fife	2–0	Airdrie United	Bayview Stadium
15:00	Sloan 42' (Penalty); Johnstone 87'	SFL Report	Adam (red card) 37'; Lynch (yellow card) 78' (red card)	Attendance: 535; Referee: Northcroft

29 February 2012 Second Division	Arbroath	2–2	Airdrie United	Gayfield Park
19:45	Gibson 9', 42'	SFL Report	Holmes 49'; Boyle 78'	Attendance: 728; Referee: Colvin

3 March 2012 Second Division	Airdrie United	1–1	Cowdenbeath	Excelsior Stadium
15:00	Lynch 39'	SFL Report	Ramsay 50' (Penalty)	Attendance: 702; Referee: Murray

10 March 2012 Second Division	Albion Rovers	0–1	Airdrie United	Cliftonhill
15:00		SFL Report	McDonald 83'	Attendance: 1,134; Referee: Anderson

17 March 2012 Second Division	Airdrie United	3–0	Forfar Athletic	Excelsior Stadium
15:00	Bain 54'; Lovering 75' (Penalty); McLaren 86'	SFL Report		Attendance: 621; Referee: Somers

24 March 2012 Second Division	Airdrie United	2–0	Arbroath	Excelsior Stadium
15:00	Lovering 73'; McLaren 90'	SFL Report		Attendance: 689; Referee: Hilland

31 March 2012 Second Division	Stirling Albion	0–2	Airdrie United	Doubletree Dunblane Stadium
15:00		SFL Report	Donnelly 20', 31'	Attendance: 677; Referee: Finnie

7 April 2012 Second Division	Stenhousemuir	0–3	Airdrie United	Ochilview Park
15:00		SFL Report	Lynch 7'; McLaren 45'; Blockley 81'; Lynch (yellow card) 91' (red card)	Attendance: 903; Referee: Winter

14 April 2012 Second Division	Airdrie United	4–1	Brechin City	Excelsior Stadium
15:00	Holmes 7', 86'; Donnelly 14'; Lovering 23' (pen.)	SFL Report	Hodge 31'	Attendance: 802; Referee: McLean

21 April 2012 Second Division	Dumbarton	2–1	Airdrie United	Strathclyde Homes Stadium
15:00	Prunty 61'; Lovering 67' (Own goal)	SFL Report	McLaren 56'; Donnelly (red card) 91'	Attendance: 1,088; Referee: McKendrick

28 April 2012 Second Division	Airdrie United	2–0	East Fife	Excelsior Stadium
15:00	Lynch 51'; Bain 82'; McLaren (red card) 91'	SFL Report	White (red card) 92'	Attendance: 1,223; Referee: Beaton

5 May 2012 Second Division	Cowdenbeath	0–0	Airdrie United	Central Park
15:00		SFL Report		Attendance: 1,345; Referee: Norris

=== First Division play-offs ===
9 May 2012 Play-offs SF R1	Airdrie United	0–0	Ayr United	Excelsior Stadium
19:45		SFL Report		Attendance: 1,871; Referee: Allan

12 May 2012 Play-offs SF R2	Ayr United	1–3 (1–3 agg.)	Airdrie United	Somerset Park
15:00	Longridge (red card) 17'; Geggan 64'; Tiffoney (yellow card) 94' (red card)	BBC Report	Holmes 55', 65'; McLaren 85'	Attendance: 2,782; Referee: McLean

16 May 2012 Play-offs Final R1	Dumbarton	2–1	Airdrie United	Dumbarton Football Stadium
19:45	Prunty 29'; Wallace 32'; Nugent (yellow card) 93' (red card)	SFL Report	Bain 42'	Attendance: 1,746; Referee: Brines

20 May 2012 Play-offs Final R2	Airdrie United	1–4 (2–6 agg.)	Dumbarton	Excelsior Stadium
20:05	Holmes 35'; Bain (red card) 78'	SFL Report	Dargo 9', 21'; Gilhaney 45'; Wallace 65'	Attendance: 2,914; Referee: Muir

=== Scottish Cup ===
19 November 2011 Scottish Cup round 3	Airdrie United	11 – 0	Gala Fairydean	Excelsior Stadium
15:00	Lovering 28' (Penalty), 69'; Boyle 31', 42', 65'; Stevenson 34', 37', 57'; McLaren 59'; Donnelly 77'; Holmes 81'	BBC Report		Attendance: 732; Referee: Anderson

7 January 2012 Scottish Cup round 4	Airdrie United	2–6	Dundee United	Excelsior Stadium
15:00	Donnelly 85', 90+2'	BBC Sport	Rankin 17'; Robertson 43'; Russell 62', 68', 84'; Mackay-Steven 71'	Attendance: 2,434; Referee: Charleston

=== Challenge Cup ===
23 July 2011 Challenge Cup	Airdrie United	0–5	Livingston	Excelsior Stadium
		BBC Report	Sinclair 50'; Russell 55', 67'; Barr 82', 90'	Attendance: 719; Referee: Charlie Richmond

=== League Cup ===
30 July 2011 Scottish League Cup Rd 1	Airdrie United	5–0	Stirling Albion	Excelsior Stadium
	Owens 32' (pen.), 78' (pen.); Donnelly 35', 81'; Bain 88'	BBC Report	Fagan (red card) 30'; Filler (red card) 78'	Attendance: 705; Referee: Hilland

23 August 2011 Scottish League Cup Rd 2	Airdrie United	2–0	Raith Rovers	Excelsior Stadium
	Holmes 27'; Donnelly 41'	BBC Report		Attendance: 683; Referee: Salmond

20 September 2011 Scottish League Cup Rd 3	Airdrie United	0–2	Dundee United	Excelsior Stadium
		BBC Report	Dow 11'; Daly 76'	Attendance: 1,252; Referee: Madden

== Player statistics ==
=== Squad ===
Last updated 26 May 2012

No.	Pos	Nat	Player	Total		Second Division		Scottish Cup		League Cup		Other^{[a]}	
No.	Pos	Nat	Player	Apps	Goals	Apps	Goals	Apps	Goals	Apps	Goals	Apps	Goals
	GK	(Scotland) SCO	Andrew Duncan	2	0	2	0	0	0	0	0	0	0
	GK	(Northern Ireland) NIR	Paul McKane	13	0	9	0	0	0	3	0	1	0
	GK	(Scotland) SCO	Connor Fairley	14	0	12	0	2	0	0	0	0	0
	GK	(Scotland) SCO	Grant Adam	18	0	14	0	0	0	0	0	4	0
	DF	(Scotland) SCO	Jamie Bain	44	4	34	2	2	0	3	1	5	1
	DF	(Scotland) SCO	Graeme Goodall	3	0	3	0	0	0	0	0	0	0
	DF	(Scotland) SCO	Cameron MacDonald	16	1	14	1	0	0	0	0	2	0
	DF	(Scotland) SCO	Ewan McNeil	9	0	6	0	0	0	0	0	3	0
	DF	(Scotland) SCO	Kevin Green	7	0	5	0	1	0	0	0	1	0
	DF	(Northern Ireland) NIR	Craig Hill	7	2	7	0	0	0	0	2	0	0
	DF	(Scotland) SCO	David Lilley	40	0	31	0	2	0	3	0	4	0
	DF	(Scotland) SCO	Paul Lovering	35	8	27	6	2	2	2	0	4	0
	DF	(Scotland) SCO	Christopher Malone	9	0	6	0	0	0	2	0	1	0
	DF	(Scotland) SCO	Kieran Stallard	41	0	31	0	2	0	3	0	5	0
	DF	(Scotland) SCO	Ricki Lamie	12	0	10	0	0	0	0	0	2	0
	MF	(Scotland) SCO	Nathan Blockley	30	2	23	2	1	0	1	0	5	0
	MF	(Scotland) SCO	Rhys Devlin	18	0	15	0	1	0	1	0	1	0
	MF	(Scotland) SCO	Phil Johnston	17	2	13	2	2	0	2	0	0	0
	MF	(Scotland) SCO	Fraser Keast	18	0	14	0	0	0	3	0	1	0
	MF	(Scotland) SCO	Sean Lynch	37	6	29	6	2	0	2	0	4	0
	MF	(Scotland) SCO	Willie McLaren	28	10	23	8	2	1	0	0	3	1
	MF	(England) ENG	Graeme Owens	24	4	20	2	1	0	3	2	0	0
	MF	(Scotland) SCO	Jamie Stevenson	39	8	31	5	2	3	2	0	4	0
	MF	(Scotland) SCO	Alistair Woodburn	2	0	1	0	0	0	0	0	1	0
	MF	(Scotland) SCO	Thomas Robertson	3	0	3	0	0+0	0	0+0	0	0+0	0
	MF	(Scotland) SCO	Liam Watt	1	0	1	0	0	0	0	0	0	0
	FW	(Scotland) SCO	John Boyle	34	9	27	6	1	3	2	0	4	0
	FW	(Scotland) SCO	Danny Burns	2	0	1	0	1	0	0	0	0	0
	FW	(Scotland) SCO	Ryan Donnelly	43	27	33	21	2	3	3	3	5	0
	FW	(Scotland) SCO	Derek Holmes	42	9	32	4	2	1	3	1	5	3
	FW	(Scotland) SCO	Scott Morton	11	1	9	1	0	0	1	0	1	0
	FW	(Scotland) SCO	Scott Sally	13	1	11	1	0	0	1	0	1	0

a. Includes other competitive competitions, including the play-offs and the 2011–12 Scottish Challenge Cup.

=== Disciplinary record ===
Includes all competitive matches.

Last updated 26 May 2012

Nation	Position	Name	Second Division		Scottish Cup		League Cup		Challenge Cup		Total	
Nation	Position	Name	Yellow card	Red card	Yellow card	Red card	Yellow card	Red card	Yellow card	Red card	Yellow card	Red card
(Scotland)	GK	Andrew Duncan	0	0	0	0	0	0	0	0	0	0
(Northern Ireland)	GK	Paul McKane	0	0	0	0	0	0	0	0	0	0
(Scotland)	GK	Connor Fairley	1	0	0	0	0	0	0	0	1	0
(Scotland)	GK	Grant Adam	0	1	0	0	0	0	0	0	0	1
(Scotland)	DF	Jamie Bain	6	0	0	0	0	0	0	1	6	1
(Scotland)	DF	Graeme Goodall	0	0	0	0	0	0	0	0	0	0
(Scotland)	DF	Cameron MacDonald	1	1	0	0	0	0	0	0	1	1
(Scotland)	DF	Ewan McNeil	0	0	0	0	0	0	0	0	0	0
(Scotland)	DF	Kevin Green	2	1	0	0	0	0	0	0	2	1
(Northern Ireland)	DF	Craig Hill	1	0	0	0	0	0	0	0	1	0
(Scotland)	DF	David Lilley	5	2	0	0	0	0	1	0	6	2
(Scotland)	DF	Paul Lovering	14	1	1	0	0	0	3	0	18	1
(Scotland)	DF	Christopher Malone	2	0	0	0	0	0	1	0	3	0
(Scotland)	DF	Kieran Stallard	6	1	1	0	0	0	0	0	7	1
(Scotland)	DF	Ricki Lamie	6	0	0	0	0	0	0	0	6	0
(Scotland)	MF	Nathan Blockley	4	0	0	0	0	0	1	0	5	0
(Scotland)	MF	Rhys Devlin	4	1	0	0	1	0	0	0	5	1
(Scotland)	MF	Phil Johnston	0	0	0	0	0	0	0	0	0	0
(Scotland)	MF	Fraser Keast	0	0	0	0	0	0	0	0	0	0
(Scotland)	MF	Sean Lynch	9	2	0	0	0	0	0	0	9	2
(Scotland)	MF	Willie McLaren	1	1	0	0	0	0	1	0	2	1
(England)	MF	Graeme Owens	3	0	0	0	1	0	0	0	4	0
(Scotland)	MF	Jamie Stevenson	9	0	1	0	0	0	0	0	10	0
(Scotland)	MF	Alistair Woodburn	0	0	0	0	0	0	0	0	0	0
(Scotland)	MF	Thomas Robertson	0	0	0	0	0	0	0	0	0	0
(Scotland)	MF	Liam Watt	0	0	0	0	0	0	0	0	0	0
(Scotland)	FW	John Boyle	0	0	0	0	0	0	0	0	0	0
(Scotland)	FW	Danny Burns	0	0	0	0	0	0	0	0	0	0
(Scotland)	FW	Ryan Donnelly	6	1	0	0	1	0	1	0	8	1
(Scotland)	FW	Derek Holmes	2	0	0	0	0	0	0	0	2	0
(Scotland)	FW	Scott Morton	1	0	0	0	0	0	0	0	1	0
(Scotland)	FW	Scott Sally	0	0	0	0	0	0	0	0	0	0

=== Awards ===
Last updated 26 May 2012

Nation	Name	Award	Month
(Scotland)	Ryan Donnelly	Ginger Boot Winner	October
(Scotland)	Ryan Donnelly	Young Player of the Month	November
(Scotland)	Jimmy Boyle	Second Division Manager of the Month	March
(Scotland)	Jimmy Boyle	April	Second Division Manager of the Month
(Scotland)	Ryan Donnelly	Second Division Player of the Year	IRN-BRU SFL End of Season Awards

== Transfers ==
=== Players in ===
Player	From	Fee
(Scotland) David Lilley	(Scotland) Queen of the South	Free
(Scotland) John Boyle	(Scotland) Auchinleck Talbot	Free
(Scotland) Christopher Malone	(Scotland) Livingston	Free
(Scotland) Alistair Woodburn	(Scotland) Ayr United	Free
(Scotland) Derek Holmes	(Scotland) Queen of the South	Free
(Scotland) Sean Lynch	(Scotland) St Mirren	Free
(Scotland) Keiran Stallard	(Scotland) Falkirk	Free
(Scotland) Connor Fairley	(Scotland) Heart of Midlothian	Free
(Scotland) Willie McLaren	(Scotland) Hamilton Academical	Loan
(Scotland) Willie McLaren	(Scotland) Hamilton Academical	Free
(Scotland) Grant Adam	(Scotland) Rangers	Loan
(Scotland) Cameron MacDonald	(Scotland) Livingston	Free
(Scotland) Ewan McNeil	(Scotland) Rangers	Loan

=== Players out ===
Player	To	Fee
(Scotland) Gary Mackay-Steven	(Scotland) Dundee United	Free
(Scotland) Andy Ferguson	(Scotland) Arthurlie	Free
(Scotland) Gary Muir	(Guatemala) Antigua GFC	Free
(Scotland) Scott Gemmill	Free agent	Free
(Scotland) Grant Smith	Free agent	Free
(Scotland) David Shaw	Free agent	Free
(Netherlands) Adam Szplcynski	Free agent	Free
(Scotland) Chris Craig	Free agent	Free
(Scotland) David Gray	(United States) Kitsap Pumas	Free
(Scotland) David Cane	(Scotland) East Stirlingshire	Free
(Scotland) Christopher Malone	Free agent	Free
(Scotland) Alistair Woodburn	Free agent	Free
(Scotland) Craig Hill	(Northern Ireland) Ballinamallard United	Free
(Northern Ireland) Paul McKane	(Scotland) Forfar Athletic	Free
(Scotland) Rhys Devlin	(Scotland) East Stirlingshire	Loan
(Scotland) Daniel Tobin	Free agent	Free
(Scotland) Connor Fairley	Free agent	Free
