= List of Airdrieonians F.C. seasons =

This is a list of Airdrieonians Football Club's seasons since the club's formation in 2002–03 as Airdrie United (having purchased and rebranded Clydebank to secure a Scottish Football League place, after the original Airdrieonians went out of business) up to the present day. The list details Airdrie's record in major league and cup competitions alongside their top league goal scorer and manager(s) for each season.

== Seasons ==
=== As Airdrie United ===
| Season | League | | | | | | | | | Scottish Cup | League Cup | Challenge Cup | Top league goalscorer | | Manager |
| Season | Division | P | W | D | L | F | A | Pts | Pos | Scottish Cup | League Cup | Challenge Cup | Name | Goals | Manager |
|---|---|---|---|---|---|---|---|---|---|---|---|---|---|---|---|
| 2002–03 (Note: Also Lanarkshire Cup winners.) | SFL 2 | 36 | 14 | 12 | 10 | 51 | 44 | 54 | 3rd | R3 | R3 | R2 | Vareille | 18 | Stewart |
| 2003–04 | SFL 2 | 36 | 20 | 10 | 6 | 64 | 36 | 70 | 1st | R3 | R2 | Runners-up | Coyle | 13 | Stewart |
| 2004–05 | SFL 1 | 36 | 14 | 8 | 14 | 44 | 48 | 50 | 5th | R3 | R2 | R1 | Coyle | 14 | Stewart |
| 2005–06 | SFL 1 | 36 | 11 | 12 | 13 | 57 | 43 | 45 | 6th | R4 | R1 | R2 | Prunty | 15 | Stewart |
| 2006–07 | SFL 1 | 36 | 11 | 7 | 18 | 39 | 50 | 40 | 9th^{[a]} | R3 | R2 | R1 | Twigg | 10 | Stewart; Black |
| 2007–08 | SFL 2 | 36 | 20 | 6 | 10 | 64 | 34 | 66 | 2nd^{[b]} | R4 | R1 | QF | Russell | 19 | Black |
| 2008–09 | SFL 1 | 36 | 10 | 12 | 14 | 29 | 43 | 42 | 9th^{[c]} | R5 | R3 | Winners | Lynch | 10 | Black |
| 2009–10 | SFL 1 | 36 | 8 | 9 | 19 | 41 | 56 | 33 | 9th^{[a]} | R4 | R1 | R1 | Baird | 11 | Black |
| 2010–11 | SFL 2 | 36 | 13 | 9 | 14 | 52 | 60 | 48 | 6th | R4 | R2 | R1 | Gemmill | 9 | Boyle |
| 2011–12 | SFL 2 | 36 | 14 | 10 | 12 | 68 | 60 | 52 | 4th | R4 | R3 | R1 | Donnelly | 21 | Boyle |
| 2012–13 | SFL 1 | 36 | 5 | 7 | 24 | 41 | 89 | 22 | 10th | R3 | R1 | R2 | Boyle | 10 | Boyle |

=== As Airdrieonians ===
| Season | League | | | | | | | | | Scottish Cup | League Cup | Challenge Cup | Top league goalscorer | | Manager |
| Season | Division | P | W | D | L | F | A | Pts | Pos | Scottish Cup | League Cup | Challenge Cup | Name | Goals | Manager |
|---|---|---|---|---|---|---|---|---|---|---|---|---|---|---|---|
| 2013–14 | League One | 36 | 12 | 9 | 15 | 47 | 57 | 45 | 6th | R3 | R2 | R2 | Jim Lister | 10 | Jimmy Boyle; Gary Bollan |
| 2014–15 | League One | 36 | 16 | 10 | 10 | 53 | 39 | 58 | 5th | R3 | R1 | R1 | Bryan Prunty | 14 | Gary Bollan |
| 2015–16 | League One | 36 | 14 | 7 | 15 | 48 | 50 | 49 | 5th | R4 | R2 | R1 | Jim Lister | 8 | Gary Bollan; Eddie Wolecki Black; Danny Lennon^{a} |
| 2016–17 | League One | 36 | 16 | 4 | 16 | 61 | 66 | 52 | 3rd (Note: Lost in Play-off semi-final.) | R3 | GS | R3 | Andy Ryan | 23 | Eddie Wolecki Black/Kevin McBride^{a} Mark Wilson |
| 2017–18 | League One | 36 | 10 | 11 | 15 | 46 | 60 | 41 | 7th | R3 | GS | R1 | Willis Furtado; Ryan Conroy | 6 | Willie Aitchison; Stevie Findlay |
| 2018–19 | League One | 36 | 14 | 6 | 16 | 51 | 44 | 48 | 5th | R4 | GS | R2 | Leighton McIntosh | 15 | Stevie Findlay; Ian Murray |
| 2019–20 | League One | 28 | 14 | 6 | 8 | 38 | 27 | 48 | 3rd^{[d]} | R4 | GS | R4 | Dale Carrick | 12 | Ian Murray |
| 2020–21 | League One | 22 | 12 | 2 | 8 | 35 | 24 | 38 | 2nd (Note: Lost in Play-off final.) | R2 | GS | N/A | Dale Carrick | 9 | Ian Murray |
| 2020–21 | League One | 36 | 21 | 9 | 6 | 68 | 37 | 72 | 2nd (Note: Lost in Play-off final.) | R4 | GS | R2 | Calum Gallagher | 15 | Ian Murray |
| 2022–23 | League One | 36 | 17 | 9 | 10 | 82 | 51 | 60 | 3rd (Note: Promoted in Play-offs.) | R4 | GS | R4 | Calum Gallagher | 22 | Rhys McCabe |
| 2023–24 | Championship | 36 | 15 | 7 | 14 | 44 | 44 | 52 | 4th (Note: Lost in Play-off quarter-final.) | R5 | R2 | W | Nikolay Todorov | 6 | Rhys McCabe |
| 2024–25 | Championship | 36 | 7 | 8 | 21 | 34 | 6 | 29 | 9th (Note: Won in Play-off final.) | R5 | R2 | R4 | Ben Wilson | 9 | Rhys McCabe |
| 2025-26 | Championship | 0 | 0 | 0 | 0 | 0 | 0 | 0 | TBA | TBA | GS | TBA | TBA | TBA | Rhys McCabe; Danny Lennon |

== Key ==
| Champions | Runners-up | Promoted | Relegated |

- P = Played
- W = Games won
- D = Games drawn
- L = Games lost
- F = Goals for
- A = Goals against
- Pts = Points
- Pos = Final position
- R1 = Round 1
- R2 = Round 2
- R3 = Round 3
- R4 = Round 4
- R5 = Round 5
- QF = Quarter-finals
- SF = Semi-finals
- SFL 1 = Scottish First Division
- SFL 2 = Scottish Second Division
- ^{a} = denotes acting managers

== Footnotes ==
a. Relegated after defeat in play-offs.
b. Defeated in play-off final but secured promotion to the First Division due to the demise of Gretna.
c. Defeated in play-off final but maintained First Division status due to the demotion of Livingston to the Third Division.
d. The 2019–20 Scottish League One was curtailed due to the COVID-19 pandemic, with league positions, promotions and relegations decided on a points-per-game basis.

== League performance summary ==
The Scottish Football League was founded in 1890 and, other than during seven years of hiatus during World War II, (Note: The incomplete 1939–40 edition has not been counted in the totals.) the national top division has been played every season since. (Note: The top tier became the Scottish Premier League in 1998, and all four divisions became the Scottish Professional Football League in 2013.) The following is a summary of Airdrieonians' divisional status since their move from Clydebank in 2002:

- 21 total eligible seasons (including 2022–23)
- 0 seasons in top level (Note: Has existed between 1890–1939, and since 1946.)
- 6 seasons in second level (Note: Has existed between 1893–1915, 1921–1939 and since 1946.)
- 15 seasons in third level (Note: Has existed between 1923–1926, 1946–1949, and since 1976.)
- 0 seasons in fourth level (Note: Has existed since 1994.)
