= 2010–11 Airdrie United F.C. season =

Airdrie United
2010–11 season
- Chairman: Jim Ballantyne
- Manager: Jimmy Boyle
- Stadium: Excelsior Stadium
- Second Division: Sixth Place
- Challenge Cup: First round, lost to Ayr United
- League Cup: Second round, lost to Kilmarnock
- Scottish Cup: Fourth round, lost to Greenock Morton
- Top goalscorer: League: Scott Gemmill (9); All: Scott Gemmill (12)
- Highest home attendance: League: 1,127 vs. Ayr United, 14 August 2010
- Lowest home attendance: League: 437 vs. Forfar Athletic, 22 February 2011
- Average home league attendance: 788

The 2010–11 season was Airdrie United's first season back in the Scottish Second Division, having been relegated from the Scottish First Division at the end of the 2009–10 season. They also competed in the Challenge Cup, League Cup and the Scottish Cup.

== Summary ==
Airdrie United finished sixth in the Second Division. They reached the first round of the Challenge Cup, the second round of the League Cup and the fourth round of the Scottish Cup.

=== Management ===
Airdrie started the season under caretaker manager Jimmy Boyle following the sacking of Kenny Black during the summer. His appointment was later made permanent on 15 September 2011.

== League table ==
Pos	Team	Pld	W	D	L	GF	GA	GD	Pts	Promotion, qualification or relegation
4	Brechin City	36	15	12	9	63	45	+18	57	Qualification for the First Division play-offs
5	East Fife	36	14	10	12	77	60	+17	52	
6	Airdrie United	36	13	9	14	52	60	−8	48	
7	Dumbarton	36	11	7	18	52	70	−18	40	
8	Stenhousemuir	36	10	8	18	46	59	−13	38	

Source: SPFL
Rules for classification: 1) points; 2) goal difference; 3) number of goals scored.

== Results and fixtures ==
Win Draw Loss

=== Second Division ===
7 August 2010 SFL2	East Fife	3–3	Airdrie United	Bayview Stadium
	Hislop 30'; Young 52'; Linn 59'; Muir (red card) 90'	SFL Report	Gemmill 50'; Grant 64'; Watt 70'	Attendance: 810; Referee: Watters

14 August 2010 SFL2	Airdrie United	2–2	Ayr United	Excelsior Stadium
	Bain (yellow card) 28' (red card); Wallace 81' (Penalty); Donnelly 85'; Wallace (red card) 91'	SFL Report	Roberts 5', 73'; Crawford (red card) 79'	Attendance: 1,127; Referee: Nicholls

21 August 2010 SFL2	Livingston	2–1	Airdrie United	Braidwood Motor Company Stadium
15:00	Russell 24'; De Vita 73'	SFL Report	Gemmill 5'	Attendance: 1,863; Referee: Colvin

28 August 2010 SFL2	Stenhousemuir	1–3	Airdrie United	Ochilview Park
	Fusco (red card) 46'; Williams 69'; Lyle (yellow card) 85' (red card)	SFL Report	McCord 38'; Lovering 46' (Penalty); Gemmill 91'	Attendance: 820; Referee: Clancy

11 September 2010 SFL2	Airdrie United	1–1	Brechin City	Excelsior Stadium
	Gibson 53'; Gibson (yellow card) 78' (red card)	SFL Report	Byers 23'; McAllister (yellow card) 56' (red card)	Attendance: 946; Referee: Northcroft

18 September 2010 SFL2	Airdrie United	2–2	Peterhead	Excelsior Stadium
	Stevenson 19'; Gemmill 81'	SFL Report	Gethans 22'; Bavidge 72'	Attendance: 846; Referee: Muir

25 September 2010 SFL2	Forfar Athletic	1–2	Airdrie United	Station Park
	Bolocheweckyj 25'	SFL Report	McCord 58'; Wallace 75'; Grant (yellow card) 76' (red card)	Attendance: 577; Referee: Law

2 October 2010 SFL2	Dumbarton	1–3	Airdrie United	Strathclyde Homes Stadium
	Maxwell 67'	SFL Report	McCord 52'; Wallace 62'; Gemmill 74'	Attendance: 812; Referee: Richmond

16 October 2010 SFL2	Airdrie United	0–1	Alloa Athletic	Excelsior Stadium
	Stallard (yellow card) 77' (red card); Devlin (red card) 73'	SFL Report	Prunty 34'	Attendance: 1,030; Referee: Robertson

23 October 2010 SFL2	Brechin City	3–1	Airdrie United	Glebe Park
	Janczyk 20'; McAllister 53'; Molloy 94'	SFL Report	Watt 26'	Attendance: 564; Referee: Somers

30 October 2010 SFL2	Airdrie United	1–0	Stenhousemuir	Excelsior Stadium
	Bain 73'	SFL Report		Attendance: 848; Referee: Richmond

6 November 2010 SFL2	Ayr United	1–0	Airdrie United	Somerset Park
	McLaughlin 93'	SFL Report	Wallace (red card) 25'	Attendance: 1,439; Referee: Norris

13 November 2010 SFL2	Airdrie United	0–1	Livingston	Excelsior Stadium
15:00		SFL Report	Russell 64'	Attendance: 1,013; Referee: Beaton

14 December 2010 SFL2	Peterhead	5–1	Airdrie United	Balmoor Stadium
	Sharp 3'; Clark 39'; Ross 44', 79'; McCord 93'	SFL Report	Gemmill 51'; Molloy (red card) 70'	Attendance: 312; Referee: Fergusson

18 December 2010 SFL2	Alloa Athletic	2–3	Airdrie United	Recreation Park
	Noble 60'; Lister 70'	SFL Report	Ferguson 6'; Stevenson 89'; Watt 90'	Attendance: 502; Referee: Law

15 January 2011 SFL2	Airdrie United	2–2	Brechin City	Excelsior Stadium
	Ferguson 48'; Forrest 55'	SFL Report	Janczyk 49'; McLean 87'	Attendance: 806; Referee: Colvin

22 January 2011 SFL2	Stenhousemuir	1–0	Airdrie United	Ochilview Park
	Murray 84'	SFL Report		Attendance: 819; Referee: McKendrick

1 February 2011 SFL2	Airdrie United	1–2	Dumbarton	Excelsior Stadium
	McCord 84' (Penalty)	SFL Report	Gilhaney 21'; Walker 48'	Attendance: 591; Referee: Crawford

5 February 2011 SFL2	Airdrie United	1–0	Peterhead	Excelsior Stadium
	Craig 30'; Devlin (red card) 91'	SFL Report		Attendance: 660; Referee: McDermott

12 February 2011 SFL2	Dumbarton	1–1	Airdrie United	Strathclyde Homes Stadium
	McShane 4'	SFL Report	Morton 91'	Attendance: 723; Referee: Charleston

15 February 2011 SFL2	Livingston	2–0	Airdrie United	Braidwood Motor Company Stadium
19:45	Russell 34' (70), pen.'	SFL Report		Attendance: 890; Referee: Watters

19 February 2011 SFL2	Airdrie United	0–2	Alloa Athletic	Excelsior Stadium
	McKeown (red card) 88'	SFL Report	Noble 28'; McGowan 72'	Attendance: 731; Referee: Finnie

22 February 2011 SFL2	Airdrie United	2–0	Forfar Athletic	Excelsior Stadium
	Donnelly 49'; Gemmill 71'	SFL Report		Attendance: 437; Referee: Winter

26 February 2011 SFL2	East Fife	0–1	Airdrie United	Bayview Stadium
		SFL Report	Gemmill 40'	Attendance: 644; Referee: Roache

5 March 2011 SFL2	Airdrie United	0–5	Ayr United	Excelsior Stadium
	Grant (red card) 87'	SFL Report	Willis 50'; Roberts 62'; Moffat 69'; Mclaughlin 82'; Rodgers 87' (Penalty)	Attendance: 966; Referee: Law

8 March 2011 SFL2	Airdrie United	1–1	East Fife	Excelsior Stadium
	Johnston 12'	SFL Report	Smart 22'	Attendance: 447; Referee: Smith

19 March 2011 SFL2	Airdrie United	2–2	Stenhousemuir	Excelsior Stadium
	Owens 16', 81'	SFL Report	Devlin 14'; Lynch 42'	Attendance: 642; Referee: Somers

26 March 2011 SFL2	Airdrie United	3–1	Forfar Athletic	Excelsior Stadium
	Gallacher 22' (Own Goal); McCord 40' (Penalty); Donnelly 43'	SFL Report	McQuade 31'	Attendance: 594; Referee: Roache

29 March 2011 SFL2	Forfar Athletic	1–2	Airdrie United	Station Park
	Bolocheweckyj 42'	SFL Report	Owens 4'; Morton 91'	Attendance: 419; Referee: Nicholls

2 April 2011 SFL2	Peterhead	2–4	Airdrie United	Balmoor Stadium
	Tosh 22', 61'	SFL Report	McVitie 6' (Own Goal); Johnston 29'; Bain 32'; Gemill 42'	Attendance: 831; Referee: Watters

5 April 2011 SFL2	Brechin City	1–2	Airdrie United	Glebe Park
	McKenna 46'	SFL Report	McLauchlan 32' (Own Goal); Donnelly 56'	Attendance: 438; Referee: McKendrick

9 April 2011 SFL2	Alloa Athletic	1–0	Airdrie United	Recreation Park
	McGowan 18'	SFL Report	Smith (red card) 45'	Attendance: 688; Referee: Clancy

16 April 2011 SFL2	Airdrie United	2–1	Dumbarton	Excelsior Stadium
	Sally 76'; Morton 81'	SFL Report	Halsman 16'	Attendance: 773; Referee: Conroy

23 April 2011 SFL2	Airdrie United	2–4	Livingston	Excelsior Stadium
15;00	Lovering 32'; Owens 55'	SFL Report	Russell 5' (7); De Vita 61'; McNulty 80'	Attendance: 872; Referee: Dunlop

30 April 2011 SFL2	Ayr United	3–1	Airdrie United	Somerset Park
	Rodgers 48', 60' (Penalty); Moffat 65'	SFL Report	Morton 46'	Attendance: 1,402; Referee: Robertson

7 May 2011 SFL2	Airdrie United	2–2	East Fife	Excelsior Stadium
	McCord 41'; Sally 83'	SFL Report	Muir 33'; Hislop 64'	Attendance: 861; Referee: Northcroft

=== Challenge Cup ===
24 July 2010 Challenge Cup round 1	Airdrie United	1–2	Ayr United	Excelsior Stadium
	Muir 51'	SFL Report	Trouten 83'; Rodgers 87'	Attendance: 624; Referee: Colvin

=== League Cup ===
31 July 2010 League Cup round 1	Albion Rovers	0–1	Airdrie United	Cliftonhill
	Muir (yellow card) 0' (red card)	BBC Report	Canning 67'; Muir (yellow card) 0' (red card)	Attendance: 1,200; Referee: Muir

25 August 2010 League Cup round 2	Kilmarnock	6–2	Airdrie United	Rugby Park
	McCord 17'; Grant 87'	BBC Report	Sammon 4', 55', 93'; Wright 32'; Kelly 64'; Sissoko 77'	Attendance: 3,066; Referee: Salmond

=== Scottish Cup ===
20 November 2010 Scottish Cup round 3	Airdrie United	2–2	Beith	Excelsior Stadium
	Lovering 79'; Bain 90'	BBC Report	McKeown 32'; McLean 63'	Attendance: 1,412; Referee: Colvin

4 January 2011 Scottish Cup round 3 Replay	Beith	3–4	Airdrie United	Bellsdale Park
	O'Keane; Craig; Fraser	BBC Report Report	Gemmill; Stevenson; McCord	Attendance: 1,500; Referee: Colvin

18 January 2011 Scottish Cup round 4	Greenock Morton	2–2	Airdrie United	Cappielow
	Graham 52'; Kean 64'	BBC Report	Mackay-Steven 23'; Stevenson 47'	Attendance: 1,339; Referee: McLean

25 January 2011 Scottish Cup round 4 Replay	Airdrie United	2–5	Greenock Morton	Excelsior Stadium
	Mackay-Steven 77'; Sally 80'; Forrest (red card) 84'	BBC Report	O'Brien 14'; Jenkins 61', 71'; Graham 68'; Monti 84' (Penalty)	Attendance: 1,033; Referee: McLean

== Player statistics ==
=== Squad ===
No.	Pos	Nat	Player	Total		Second Division		Scottish Cup		League Cup		Challenge Cup		
No.	Pos	Nat	Player	Apps	Goals	Apps	Goals	Apps	Goals	Apps	Goals	Apps	Goals	
	GK	(Scotland) SCO	Mark Ridgers	41	0	34	0	4	0	2	0	1	0	
	GK	(Spain) ESP	Adam Szpilcynski	2	0	2	0	0	0	0	0	0	0	
	DF	(Scotland) SCO	Jamie Bain	39	3	32	2	4	1	2	0	1	0	
	DF	(Scotland) SCO	Graeme Goodall	6	0	4	0	2	0	0	0	0	0	
	DF	(Northern Ireland) NIR	Craig Hill	5	0	5	0	0	0	0	0	0	0	0
	DF	(Scotland) SCO	Paul Lovering	32	3	27	2	3	1	1	0	1	0	
	DF	(Scotland) SCO	Euan Grant	26	2	20	1	3	0	2	1	1	0	
	DF	(Scotland) SCO	Scott Gibson	18	1	13	1	2	0	2	0	1	0	
	DF	(Scotland) SCO	Harry McGregor	6	0	4	0	0	0	2	0	0	0	
	DF	(Scotland) SCO	Eddie Forrest	13	1	9	1	4	0	0	0	0	0	
	DF	(Scotland) SCO	Adam Fairweather	5	0	5	0	0	0	0	0	0	0	
	MF	(Scotland) SCO	Nathan Blockley	6	0	6	0	0	0	0	0	0	0	
	MF	(Scotland) SCO	Rhys Devlin	37	0	30	0	4	0	2	0	1	0	
	MF	(Scotland) SCO	Phil Johnston	32	2	28	2	3	0	1	0	0	0	
	MF	(England) ENG	Graeme Owens	12	4	12	4	0	0	0	0	0	0	
	MF	(Scotland) SCO	Jamie Stevenson	30	4	27	2	3	2	0	0	0	0	
	MF	(Scotland) SCO	Gary Mackay-Steven	21	2	19	0	2	2	0	0	0	0	
	MF	(Scotland) SCO	Gary Muir	19	1	13	0	4	0	1	0	1	1	
	MF	(Scotland) SCO	Grant Smith	8	0	8	0	0	0	0	0	0	0	
	MF	(Scotland) SCO	David Gray	6	0	6	0	0	0	0	0	0	0	
	MF	(Scotland) SCO	Kieran Stallard	30	0	27	0	0	0	2	0	1	0	
	MF	(Scotland) SCO	Ryan McCord	37	8	32	6	3	1	2	1	0	0	
	MF	(Scotland) SCO	Sean Burns	4	0	3	0	0	0	0	0	1	0	
	MF	(Scotland) SCO	Patrick McCabe	1	0	0	0	0	0	0	0	1	0	
	MF	(Scotland) SCO	Alistair Morgan	1	0	0	0	0	0	0	0	1	0	
	MF	(Scotland) SCO	Jonathan Fisher	3	0	1	0	2	0	0	0	0	0	
	MF	(Scotland) SCO	Neil MacFarlane	1	0	1	0	0	0	0	0	0	0	
	MF	(Scotland) SCO	Stephen McKeown	5	0	5	0	0	0	0	0	0	0	
	FW	(Scotland) SCO	Fraser Keast	5	0	5	0	0	0	0	0	0	0	
	FW	(Scotland) SCO	Ryan Donnelly	20	4	17	4	3	0	0	0	0	0	
	FW	(Scotland) SCO	Scott Morton	9	4	9	4	0	0	0	0	0	0	
	FW	(Scotland) SCO	Scott Sally	21	3	18	2	2	1	1	0	0	0	
	FW	(Scotland) SCO	Andy Ferguson	8	2	6	2	2	0	0	0	0	0	
	FW	(Scotland) SCO	Scott Gemmill	34	12	30	9	2	2	2	1	0	0	
	FW	(Scotland) SCO	Chris Craig	13	1	11	1	2	0	0	0	0	0	
	FW	(Scotland) SCO	Tony Watt	19	3	15	3	1	0	2	0	1	0	
	FW	(Scotland) SCO	Ryan Wallace	11	3	8	3	1	0	1	0	1	0	
	FW	(Scotland) SCO	Aiden Malone	1	0	1	0	0	0	0	0	0	0	

== See also ==
- List of Airdrie United F.C. seasons
