= 2009–10 Airdrie United F.C. season =

Airdrie United
2009–10 season
- Chairman: Kenny Black
- Manager: Jimmy Boyle
- Stadium: Excelsior Stadium
- Scottish First Division: Ninth place
- Scottish Cup: Fourth round
- League Cup: First round
- Challenge Cup: First round
- Top goalscorer: League: John Baird (11); All: John Baird (13)

Season 2009–10 was Airdrie United's eighth competitive season. They competed in the First Division, Challenge Cup, League Cup and the Scottish Cup.

== Summary ==
Airdrie United finished ninth in the First Division, entering the play-offs losing 3–1 to Brechin on aggregate and were relegated to the Second Division. They reached the fourth round of the Scottish Cup, the first round of the League Cup and the first round of the Challenge Cup.

== League table ==
Pos	Team	Pld	W	D	L	GF	GA	GD	Pts	Promotion, qualification or relegation
6	Partick Thistle	36	14	6	16	43	40	+3	48	
7	Raith Rovers	36	11	9	16	36	47	−11	42	
8	Greenock Morton	36	11	4	21	40	65	−25	37	
9	Airdrie United (R)	36	8	9	19	41	56	−15	33	Qualification to the First Division play-offs
10	Ayr United (R)	36	7	10	19	29	60	−31	31	Relegation to the Second Division

Source: Scottish Football League
Rules for classification: 1) points; 2) goal difference; 3) number of goals scored.
First Division play-offs: The 9th place team will be entered into a play-off with the 2nd, 3rd and 4th places of the Second Division. The winner gets a place in the 2010-11 First Division
(R) Relegated

== Results and fixtures ==
Win Draw Loss

=== First Division ===
8 August 2009 SFL1	Ross County	2–1	Airdrie United	Victoria Park
	Di Giacomo 18'; Wood 32'	SFL Report; BBC Report	Baird 42' (pen.); Lagana (yellow card) 45' (red card)	Attendance: 1,781; Referee: Thompson

15 August 2009 SFL1	Airdrie United	1–1	Queen of the South	Excelsior Stadium
	Donnelly 81'	SFL Report	Kean 70'	Attendance: 1,079; Referee: Charleston

22 August 2009 SFL1	Dunfermline Athletic	2–0	Airdrie United	East End Park
	Bayne 19'; Nolan 58' (Own Goal)	SFL Report; BBC Report		Attendance: 2,834; Referee: Law

29 August 2009 SFL1	Airdrie United	1–1	Dundee	Excelsior Stadium
	Lauchlan 42' (Own Goal)	SFL Report; BBC Report	McMenamin 36'	Attendance: 1,516; Referee: Nicholls

12 September 2009 SFL1	Ayr United	1–1	Airdrie United	Somerset Park
	Roberts 48'	SFL Report; BBC Report	Gemmill 9'	Attendance: 1,718; Referee: Salmond

19 September 2009 SFL1	Airdrie United	1–1	Inverness Caledonian Thistle	Excelsior Stadium
	Baird 25'	SFL Report	Hayes 83'	Attendance: 951; Referee: McKendrick

26 September 2009 SFL1	Greenock Morton	1–0	Airdrie United	Cappielow
	Graham 79'	SFL Report		Attendance: 2,104; Referee: O'Reilly

3 October 2009 SFL1	Partick Thistle	2–0	Airdrie United	Firhill Stadium
	Hodge 53'; Donnelly 67'	SFL Report		Attendance: 2,839; Referee: Muir

10 October 2009 SFL1	Airdrie United	1–2	Raith Rovers	Excelsior Stadium
	O'Carroll 87'	SFL Report; BBC Report	Davidson 26'; Willianson 47'; Tade (yellow card) 84' (red card)	Attendance: 1,186; Referee: Richmond

17 October 2009 SFL1	Airdrie United	0–1	Ross County	Excelsior Stadium
		SFL Report	Wood 78'	Attendance: 756; Referee: Law

24 October 2009 SFL1	Queen of the South	3–0	Airdrie United	Palmerston Park
	Kean 41'; Lilley 27'; Wyness 83'	SFL Report		Attendance: 2,094; Referee: Charleston

31 October 2009 SFL1	Airdrie United	3–1	Ayr United	Excelsior Stadium
	Trouten 35', 73'; O'Carroll 61'	SFL Report	McCann 45' (Own Goal)	Attendance: 1,184; Referee: Evans

7 November 2009 SFL1	Dundee	2–1	Airdrie United	Dens Park
	Higgins 28', 35'	BBC Report	Baird 25'	Attendance: 4,121; Referee: McDermott

14 November 2009 SFL1	Inverness Caledonian Thistle	2–0	Airdrie United	Caledonian Stadium
	Sanchez 45'; Odhiambo 69'	SFL Report		Attendance: 2,780; Referee: MacKay

21 November 2009 SFL1	Airdrie United	2–4	Greenock Morton	Excelsior Stadium
	Nixon 2'; Baird 4'	BBC Report	McGuffie 43'; Wake 45', 53' van Zanten 67'	Attendance: 1,164; Referee: Conroy

12 December 2009 SFL1	Airdrie United	2–5	Partick Thistle	Excelsior Stadium
	Baird 1', 52'	SFL Report	Donnelly 26'; McKeown 45'; Lovell 47', 55'; Cairney 66'	Attendance: 1,321; Referee: Crawford

15 December 2009 SFL1	Raith Rovers	1–1	Airdrie United	Stark's Park
	Corredera 4'	SFL Report	Gemmill 84'	Attendance: 1,247; Referee: Macdonald

19 December 2009 SFL1	Ross County	5–3	Airdrie United	Victoria Park
	Craig 1'; Brittain 32', 63' (pen.); Gardyne 48'; Scott 79'	SFL Report	Waddell 29'; O'Carroll 34'; McDonald 78' (pen.)	Attendance: 1,823; Referee: Finnie

3 January 2010 SFL1	Dundee	0–1	Airdrie United	Dens Park
		SFL Report	McDonald 25' (pen.)	Attendance: 4,319; Referee: Brown

23 January 2010 SFL1	Airdrie United	0–1	Inverness Caledonian Thistle	Excelsior Stadium
		SFL Report	Rooney 43' (pen.)	Attendance: 839; Referee: McLean

13 February 2010 SFL1	Partick Thistle	2–0	Airdrie United	Firhill Stadium
	Cairney 29', 42'	SFL Report		Attendance: 2,404; Referee: MacDonald

6 March 2010 SFL1	Dunfermline Athletic	2–0	Airdrie United	East End Park
	Kirk 54' (pen.); Bell 87'	SFL Report		Attendance: 2,252; Referee: Muir

9 March 2010 SFL1	Airdrie United	1–1	Dunfermline Athletic	Excelsior Stadium
	Waddell 24'	SFL Report	Gibson 87'	Attendance: 703; Referee: Winter

13 March 2010 SFL1	Airdrie United	1–1	Ayr United	Excelsior Stadium
	Keegan 95'	SFL Report	McKay 91'	Attendance: 1,122; Referee: Law

17 March 2010 SFL1	Greenock Morton	2–1	Airdrie United	Cappielow
	Weatherson 20'; MacGregor 66'	SFL Report	O'Carroll 56'	Attendance: 1,266; Referee: Conroy

20 March 2010 SFL1	Airdrie United	3–0	Dundee	Excelsior Stadium
	McLaughlin 54'; O'Carroll 60'; Gemmill 75'	SFL Report		Attendance: 1,172; Referee: Finnie

23 March 2010 SFL1	Inverness Caledonian Thistle	4–0	Airdrie United	Caledonian Stadium
	Rooney 10'; Foran 24'; Munro 46'; Hayes 83'	SFL Report		Attendance: 2,008; Referee: Murray

27 March 2010 SFL1	Airdrie United	3–0	Greenock Morton	Excelsior Stadium
	McGuffie 34' (o.g.); Lovering 56' (pen.), 65' (pen.)	SFL Report		Attendance: 1,017; Referee: Colvin

3 April 2010 SFL1	Airdrie United	2–0	Partick Thistle	Excelsior Stadium
	Lovering 71' (pen.); McLaughlin 74'	SFL Report		Attendance: 1,142; Referee: McLean

12 April 2010 SFL1	Airdrie United	0–1	Queen of the South	Excelsior Stadium
		SFL Report	Mclaren 88'	Attendance: 825; Referee: Somers

14 April 2010 SFL1	Airdrie United	3–0	Raith Rovers	Excelsior Stadium
	Baird 5', 65'; Waddell 84'	SFL Report		Attendance: 815; Referee: O'Rielly

17 April 2010 SFL1	Airdrie United	1–1	Ross County	Excelsior Stadium
	McDonald 90' (pen.)	SFL Report	Craig 63'	Attendance: 798; Referee: Nicholson

21 April 2010 SFL1	Ayr United	1–4	Airdrie United	Somerset Park
	Keenan 67'	SFL Report	Gemmill 46'; Baird 65', 69', 93'	Attendance: 1,781; Referee: Charleston

24 April 2010 SFL1	Queen of the South	2–2	Airdrie United	Palmerston Park
	Homes 33'; Weatherston 92'	SFL Report	Gemmill 43'; Waddell 50'	Attendance: 2,541; Referee: Madden

26 April 2010 SFL1	Raith Rovers	0–1	Airdrie United	Stark's Park
		SFL Report	McLaughlin 81'	Attendance: 1,539; Referee: Watters

1 May 2010 SFL1	Airdrie United	0–1	Dunfermline Athletic	Excelsior Stadium
		SFL Report	Phinn 37'	Attendance: 1,864; Referee: Crawford

=== First Division play-offs ===
5 May 2010 Play-offs SF R1	Brechin City	2–1	Airdrie United	Glebe Park
19:45	McAllister 10'; King 44' (pen.)	BBC Sport	Gemmill 15'	Attendance: 583; Referee: Winter

8 May 2010 Play-offs SF R2	Airdrie United	0–1	Brechin City	Excelsior Stadium
15:00		BBC Sport	McAllister 61'	Attendance: 1,156; Referee: Norris

=== Challenge Cup ===
25 July 2009 Challenge Cup R1	Airdrie United	0–1	Partick Thistle	Excelsior Stadium
15:00		BBC Sport	Buchanan 51'	Attendance: 1,325; Referee: Smith

=== League Cup ===
1 August 2009 League Cup R1	Airdrie United	0–0 (a.e.t.) (3–4 p)	Alloa Athletic	Excelsior Stadium
15:00	Lovering (red card) 25'	BBC Sport	Anderson (red card) 110'	Attendance: 756; Referee: Richmond

=== Scottish Cup ===
28 November 2009 Scottish Cup R3	Airdrie United	4–0	Queen of the South	Excelsior Stadium
15:00	Trouten 11', 39'; Baird 23'; O'Carroll 65'	BBC Sport		Attendance: 1,141; Referee: Norris

25 January 2010 Scottish Cup R4	Raith Rovers	1–1	Airdrie United	Stark's Park
19:45	Simmons (red card) 28'; Smyth 56' (o.g.)	BBC Sport	Baird 5'	Attendance: 1,599; Referee: Nicholls

27 January 2010 Scottish Cup R4 Replay	Airdrie United	1–3	Raith Rovers	Excelsior Stadium
19:45	Donnelly 39'; Robertson (yellow card) 90' (red card)	BBC Sport	K.Smith 24'; Tadé 45'; Russell 90' (pen.)	Attendance: 852; Referee: Nicholls

== Player statistics ==
=== Squad ===
No.	Pos	Nat	Player	Total		First Division		Scottish Cup		League Cup		Other^{[a]}	
No.	Pos	Nat	Player	Apps	Goals	Apps	Goals	Apps	Goals	Apps	Goals	Apps	Goals
	GK	(Scotland) SCO	Stephen Robertson	37	0	33	0	2	0	1	0	1	0
	GK	(Scotland) SCO	Lee Hollis	5	0	3	0	0	0	0	0	2	0
	DF	(Scotland) SCO	David Nixon	8	1	6	1	0	0	1	0	1	0
	DF	(Scotland) SCO	Bobby Donnelly	36	1	30	1	2	0	1	0	3	0
	DF	(Scotland) SCO	Jamie Bain	1	0	1	0	0	0	0	0	0	0
	DF	(Scotland) SCO	Paul Lovering	28	3	24	3	1	0	1	0	2	0
	DF	(Scotland) SCO	Ricky Waddell	35	3	29	3	2	0	1	0	3	0
	DF	(Scotland) SCO	Tom Parratt	12	0	10	0	1	0	0	0	1	0
	DF	(Australia) AUS	Simon Storey	34	0	30	0	2	0	0	0	2	0
	DF	(Scotland) SCO	Marc Smyth	26	0	23	0	1	0	0	0	2	0
	MF	(Scotland) SCO	Fraser Keast	1	0	1	0	0	0	0	0	0	0
	MF	(Scotland) SCO	Darren Smith	21	0	17	0	1	0	1	0	2	0
	MF	(Scotland) SCO	Alan Trouten	31	4	26	2	2	2	1	0	2	0
	MF	(England) ENG	Kevin McDonald	33	3	28	3	2	0	1	0	2	0
	MF	(Scotland) SCO	Scott McLaughlin	38	3	32	3	2	0	1	0	3	0
	MF	(Australia) AUS	Frankie Lagana	21	0	18	0	1	0	1	0	1	0
	MF	(Scotland) SCO	Ryan McCann	32	0	28	0	2	0	0	0	2	0
	FW	(Ireland) EIR	Paul Keegan	31	1	25	1	2	0	1	0	3	0
	FW	(Scotland) SCO	John Baird	35	13	29	11	2	2	1	0	3	0
	FW	(Scotland) SCO	Kevin Watt	22	0	19	0	1	0	1	0	1	0
	FW	(Scotland) SCO	Scott Gemmill	27	6	22	5	1	0	1	0	3	1
	FW	(Ireland) EIR	Diarmuid O'Carroll	31	6	28	5	1	1	0	0	2	0
			Trialists	7	0	7	0	0	0	0	0	0	0

a. Includes other competitive competitions, including playoffs and the Scottish Challenge Cup.
