= Nathan Blockley =

Scottish footballer

Personal information
- Date of birth: 15 June 1992 (age 34)
- Position: Midfielder

Youth career
- Queen's Park

Senior career*
Years	Team	Apps	(Gls)
2011–2015	Airdrieonians	102	(9)
2015–2017	Peterhead	35	(1)
2017–2018	Stenhousemuir	6	(2)
Total		143	(12)
- * Club domestic league appearances and goals

Nathan Blockley (born 15 June 1992) is a Scottish former footballer who played as a midfielder.

== Career ==
Blockley started his career as a youth player with Glasgow side Queen's Park. In 2011, he signed a contract with Airdrie United. At the end of the 2014–15 season, Blockley was released after four years with the club, signing for Peterhead in July 2015. He then played with Stenhousemuir, leaving in May 2018.

== Later life ==
In April 2021, Blockley pleaded guilty to being involved in money laundering.

== Career statistics ==
Appearances and goals by club, season and competition
Club	Season	League			Scottish Cup		League Cup		Other		Total	
Club	Season	Division	Apps	Goals	Apps	Goals	Apps	Goals	Apps	Goals	Apps	Goals
Airdrie United	2010–11	Second Division	6	0	0	0	0	0	0	0	6	0
Airdrie United	2011–12	Second Division	23	2	1	0	1	0	1 (Note: Appearance(s) in the Scottish Challenge Cup)	0	26	2
Airdrie United	2012–13	First Division	26	2	0	0	1	1	1	0	28	3
Airdrieonians	2013–14	League One	25	2	1	0	2	1	1	1	29	4
Airdrieonians	2014–15	League One	22	3	2	0	1	0	1	1	26	4
Airdrieonians	Total		102	9	4	0	5	2	4	2	115	13
Peterhead	2015–16	League One	23	1	1	0	1	0	5 (Note: Three appearances in the Scottish Challenge Cup and two in the Championship play-offs)	0	30	1
Peterhead	2016–17	League One	12	0	1	0	5	0	4 (Note: Two appearances in the Scottish Challenge Cup and two in the League One play-offs)	0	22	0
Peterhead	Total		35	1	2	0	6	0	9	0	52	1
Stenhousemuir	2017–18	League Two	6	2	0	0	2	0	1	0	9	2
Career total			143	12	6	0	13	2	14	2	176	16
