= Jamie Bain =

Scottish footballer

Personal information
- Date of birth: 6 August 1991 (age 35)
- Place of birth: Bellshill, Scotland
- Height: 1.75 m (5 ft 9 in)
- Position: Full back

Team information
- Current team: Pollok

Senior career*
Years	Team	Apps	(Gls)
2008–2016	Airdrieonians	191	(12)
2016–2020	Forfar Athletic	120	(3)
2020–2021	Clyde	12	(0)
2021–2023	Brechin City	55	(3)
2023–2024	Gartcairn		
2024–	Pollok	39	(1)
- * Club domestic league appearances and goals as of 20:32, 27 December 2024 (UTC)

Jamie Bain (born 6 August 1991) is a Scottish footballer who plays for Lowland League West club Pollok as a full back.

== Career statistics ==
As of matches played 27 December 2024

Appearances and goals by club, season and competition
Club	Season	League			Scottish Cup		League Cup		Other		Total	
Club	Season	Division	Apps	Goals	Apps	Goals	Apps	Goals	Apps	Goals	Apps	Goals
Airdrie United	2008–09	First Division	1	0	0	0	0	0	0	0	1	0
Airdrie United	2009–10	First Division	1	0	0	0	0	0	0	0	1	0
Airdrie United	2010–11	Second Division	32	2	2	0	1	0	0	0	35	2
Airdrie United	2011–12	Second Division	34	2	1	0	3	1	1 (Note: Appearances in the Scottish Challenge Cup)	0	39	3
Airdrie United	2012–13	First Division	31	3	0	0	0	0	1	0	32	3
Airdrieonians	2013–14	League One	32	1	1	0	2	0	1	0	36	1
Airdrieonians	2014–15	League One	30	2	1	0	1	0	1	0	33	2
Airdrieonians	2015–16	League One	30	2	2	0	2	0	1	0	35	2
Airdrieonians	Total		191	12	7	0	9	1	5	0	212	13
Forfar Athletic	2016–17	League Two	33	0	2	0	3	0	7 (Note: Three appearances in the Scottish Challenge Cup; four appearances and a goal in the League One play-offs)	1	45	1
Forfar Athletic	2017–18	League One	10	0	0	0	4	0	1	0	15	0
Forfar Athletic	Total		43	0	2	0	7	0	8	1	60	1
Career total			235	12	9	0	16	1	13	1	273	14
