= Sean Burns (footballer) =

Scottish footballer (born 1991)

Personal information
- Date of birth: 6 October 1991 (age 35)
- Place of birth: Rutherglen, Scotland
- Height: 1.78 m (5 ft 10 in)
- Position: Left-back

Team information
- Current team: Camelon Juniors
- Number: 2

Senior career*
Years	Team	Apps	(Gls)
2008–2010	St Mirren	2	(0)
2010–2011	Airdrie United	3	(0)
2011–2018	Queen's Park	210	(19)
2018–2019	Brechin City	30	(2)
2019–2020	Forfar Athletic	8	(1)
2020	Stenhousemuir	4	(0)
2020–2022	Stranraer	43	(2)
2022–2024	Pollok	45	(3)
2024–	Camelon Juniors		

International career
2009	Scotland U19	1	(1)
- * Club domestic league appearances and goals as of 11:57, 27 November 2025 (UTC)

Sean Burns (born 6 October 1991, in Rutherglen) is a Scottish semi-professional footballer who plays for East of Scotland League Premier Division club Camelon Juniors as a left-back.

Burns made over 200 Scottish League appearances for Queen's Park and was capped by Scotland at U19 level.

== Club career ==
=== St Mirren ===
A product of the St Mirren youth system, Burns won his maiden calls into the first team squad for two late-2007–08 season matches, but remained an unused substitute during both. He signed his first professional contract in May 2008. Burns made his senior debut for the club as a substitute for Dennis Wyness after 72 minutes of a 2–2 Scottish Premier League draw with Falkirk on 14 February 2009. He made two further substitute appearances during the 2008–09 season, but failed to appear again before his release at the end of the 2009–10 season.

=== Airdrie United ===
On 19 August 2010, Burns joined Second Division club Airdrie United on a contract running until the end of the year. He made four appearances before his release.

=== Queen's Park ===
In April 2010, Burns joined Scottish Third Division club Queen's Park on a contract running until the end of the 2010–11 season. He appeared in the Spiders' Second Division play-off campaign, but could not help the team to promotion. Burns signed a new contract in July 2011 and remained at Hampden Park until the end of the 2017–18 season, but which time he had made 265 appearances and scored 26 goals for the club. He was a part of the team that was promoted from League Two at the end of the 2015–16 season and was voted the club's Player of the Year. He also captained the team and played in every outfield position.

=== Brechin City ===
On 27 May 2018, Burns transferred to League One club Brechin City. He made 36 appearances and scored two goals during a dreadful 2018–19 season, which culminated in relegation to League Two. Burns departed Glebe Park at the end of the season.

=== Forfar Athletic ===
On 29 May 2019, Burns joined League One club Forfar Athletic on a one-year contract. He made 13 appearances and scored one goal before his departure in January 2020.

=== Stenhousemuir ===
On 25 January 2020, Burns transferred to League Two club Stenhousemuir on a contract running until the end of the 2019–20 season. He made four appearances before he was released.

=== Stranraer ===
On 5 July 2020, Burns signed a contract with newly-relegated League Two club Stranraer. He made 18 appearances during a 2020–21 season which ended with a semi-final defeat in the League One play-offs. Named vice-captain, Burns remained at Stair Park for 2021–22 and made 35 appearances during a mid-table season, scoring two goals. Work commitments led to his departure from the club in June 2022.

=== Pollok ===
In June 2022, Burns signed a two-year contract with West of Scotland League Premier Division club Pollok. He made 66 appearances and scored four goals across the 2022–23 and 2023–24 seasons.

=== Camelon Juniors ===
On 18 June 2024, Burns transferred to East of Scotland League First Division club Camelon Juniors.

== International career ==
Burns was capped by Scotland at U19 level.

== Career statistics ==
As of match played 30 September 2023

Appearances and goals by club, season and competition
Club	Season	League			Scottish Cup		League Cup		Other		Total	
Club	Season	Division	Apps	Goals	Apps	Goals	Apps	Goals	Apps	Goals	Apps	Goals
St Mirren	2007–08	Scottish Premier League	0	0	0	0	0	0	—		0	0
St Mirren	2008–09	Scottish Premier League	2	0	1	0	0	0	—		3	0
St Mirren	2009–10	Scottish Premier League	0	0	0	0	0	0	—		0	0
St Mirren	Total		2	0	1	0	0	0	—		3	0
Airdrie United	2010–11	Scottish Second Division	3	0	0	0	0	0	1 (Note: Appearances in Scottish Challenge Cup)	0	4	0
Queen's Park	2010–11	Scottish Third Division	1	0	—		—		2 (Note: Appearances in Scottish Third Division/Scottish League Two play-offs)	0	3	0
Queen's Park	2011–12	Scottish Third Division	26	3	3	1	1	0	2 (Note: 1 appearance in Scottish Third Division play-offs, 1 appearance in Scottish Challenge Cup)	0	32	4
Queen's Park	2012–13	Scottish Third Division	27	5	2	0	3	1	3 (Note: 2 appearances in Scottish Third Division play-offs, 1 appearance in Scottish Challenge Cup)	1	35	6
Queen's Park	2013–14	Scottish League Two	28	1	3	0	1	0	1	0	33	1
Queen's Park	2014–15	Scottish League Two	32	4	2	1	1	0	4	0	39	5
Queen's Park	2015–16	Scottish League Two	32	3	3	0	1	0	8 (Note: 4 appearances and 1 goal in Scottish League Two play-offs, 4 appearances in Scottish Challenge Cup)	1	44	4
Queen's Park	2016–17	Scottish League One	30	0	3	0	4	2	2	0	39	2
Queen's Park	2017–18	Scottish League One	34	3	0	0	3	0	3 (Note: 2 appearances in Scottish League One play-offs, 1 appearance in Scottish Challenge Cup)	0	40	3
Queen's Park	Total		210	19	16	2	14	3	25	2	265	26
Brechin City	2018–19	Scottish League One	30	2	1	0	4	0	1	0	36	2
Forfar Athletic	2019–20	Scottish League One	8	1	0	0	4	0	1	0	13	1
Stenhousemuir	2019–20	Scottish League Two	4	0	—		—		—		4	0
Stranraer	2020–21	Scottish League Two	13	0	1	0	2	0	2 (Note: Appearances in Scottish League One play-offs)	0	18	0
Stranraer	2021–22	Scottish League Two	30	2	1	0	3	0	1	0	35	2
Stranraer	Total		43	2	2	0	5	0	3	0	53	2
Pollok	2022–23	West of Scotland League Premier Division	25	3	4	1	—		3 (Note: 2 appearances in South Region Challenge Cup, 1 appearance in West of Scotland League Cup)	0	32	4
Pollok	2023–24	West of Scotland League Premier Division	20	0	4	0	—		10 (Note: 5 appearances in West of Scotland League Cup, 4 appearances in South Region Challenge Cup, 1 appearance in Scottish Junior Cup)	0	34	0
Pollok	Total		45	3	8	1	—		13	0	66	4
Career total			345	27	28	3	27	3	43	2	443	35

== Honours ==
Queen's Park

- Scottish League One play-offs: 2016

Individual

- Queen's Park Player of the Year: 2015–16
