= Fraser Keast =

Scottish footballer

Personal information
- Date of birth: 13 November 1992 (age 33)
- Place of birth: Scotland
- Position: Midfielder

Team information
- Current team: Armadale Thistle

Youth career
- Airdrie United

Senior career*
Years	Team	Apps	(Gls)
2010–2013	Airdrie United	20	(0)
2012-2013	→ Broxburn Athletic		
2013-2016	Broxburn Athletic		
2016-2020	Bo'ness United		
2020-	Armadale Thistle		
- * Club domestic league appearances and goals as of 17:44, 16 September 2012 (UTC)

Fraser Keast (born 13 November 1992) is a Scottish footballer who plays for Armadale Thistle as a midfielder.

== Career ==
=== Airdrie ===
Keast made his first team debut on 11 May 2009 starting against St Johnstone in the Scottish First Division on the final day of the season. His next appearance came against Dunfermline Athletic on 22 August 2009, in what would prove to be his only appearance that season whilst still playing for the under 19's.

During the 2010-11 season Keast made five appearances and was rewarded with a one-year contract extension until May 2012.

== Career statistics ==
As of 21 December 2011

Club statistics
Club	Season	League		Scottish Cup		League Cup		Other		Total	
Club	Season	App	Goals	App	Goals	App	Goals	App	Goals	App	Goals
Airdrie United	2008-09 season	1	0	0	0	0	0	0	0	1	0
Airdrie United	2009-10 season	1	0	0	0	0	0	0	0	1	0
Airdrie United	2010-11 season	15	0	0	0	0	0	0	5	0	
Airdrie United	2011-12 season	15	0	2	0	3	0	1	0	21	0
Total		32	0	0	0	3	0	1	0	36	0
