= Craig Hill (footballer) =

Northern Irish footballer

Personal information
- Date of birth: 1 July 1991 (age 35)
- Place of birth: Enniskillen, Northern Ireland
- Height: 6 ft 0 in (1.83 m)
- Position: Defender

Youth career
- 1999–2009: Ballinamallard United

Senior career*
| Years | Team | Apps | (Gls) |
| 2009–2010 | Dundee United | 1 | (0) |
| 2011–2012 | Airdrie United | 12 | (0) |
| 2012–2013 | Ballinamallard United | | |
| 2014 | Ballinamallard United | | |
- * Club domestic league appearances and goals as of 16:11, 2 December 2010 (UTC)

Craig Hill (born 1 July 1991) is a Northern Irish footballer who has played as a defender for Dundee United, Airdrie United and Ballinamallard United.

== Early life ==
Hill was born in Enniskillen, County Fermanagh, where he was educated at Portora Royal School. He played youth football for Ballinamallard United from the age of 6.

== Playing career ==
=== Club ===
Hill joined Scottish Premier League club Dundee United in 2009 and played regularly in the youth team. He made one first team appearance, in the May 2010 match at home to Rangers, playing the entire 90 minutes. Despite being promoted to the senior squad in 2010-11 pre-season, Hill left full-time football to study at the University of Glasgow, but signed part-time with Airdrie United in January 2011. After his career at the club was disrupted by a facial injury, Hill was released by Airdrie in December 2011 in order to find a club back in Northern Ireland. He rejoined Ballinamallard United in January 2012 and helped the club win promotion to the IFA Premiership for the first time in their history. Although he had previously mainly played as a central defender, he began to play regularly at right back following an injury to Mark McConkey. Hill left Ballinamallard in July 2013 due to his university commitments in Scotland, but rejoined the club in January 2014.

=== International ===
Hill was selected for the Northern Ireland under-19 squad for the Elite Section of the 2009 Milk Cup tournament.

== Outside football ==
Hill graduated from the University of Glasgow in 2014 with a first class honours MA degree in mathematics and economics. Since then he has worked for Goldman Sachs as a senior analyst and now Natixis bank.

== Career statistics ==
Appearances and goals by club, season and competition
| Club | Season | League | | | National Cup | | League Cup | | Continental | | Other | | Total | |
| Club | Season | Division | Apps | Goals | Apps | Goals | Apps | Goals | Apps | Goals | Apps | Goals | Apps | Goals |
|---|---|---|---|---|---|---|---|---|---|---|---|---|---|---|
| Dundee United | 2009-10 | Scottish Premier League | 1 | 0 | 0 | 0 | 0 | 0 | 0 | 0 | 0 | 0 | 1 | 0 |
| Dundee United | 2010–11 | Scottish Premier League | 0 | 0 | 0 | 0 | 0 | 0 | 0 | 0 | 0 | 0 | 0 | 0 |
| Total | | | 1 | 0 | 0 | 0 | 0 | 0 | 0 | 0 | 0 | 0 | 1 | 0 |
| Airdrie United | 2011–12 | SFL Second Division | 5 | 0 | 0 | 0 | 0 | 0 | 0 | 0 | 0 | 0 | 5 | 0 |
| Airdrie United | 2012–13 | SFL Second Division | 7 | 0 | 0 | 0 | 2 | 0 | 0 | 0 | 0 | 0 | 9 | 0 |
| Total | | | 12 | 0 | 0 | 0 | 2 | 0 | 0 | 0 | 0 | 0 | 14 | 0 |
| Career total | | | 13 | 0 | 0 | 0 | 2 | 0 | 0 | 0 | 0 | 0 | 15 | 0 |
