= 2011–12 Scottish Second Division =

Irn Bru Scottish Second Division
- Season: 2011–12
- Champions: Cowdenbeath
- Promoted: Cowdenbeath; Dumbarton; Airdrieonians F.C.
- Relegated: Stirling Albion
- Matches played: 180
- Goals scored: 577 (3.21 per match)
- Top goalscorer: Steven Doris (21)
- Biggest home win: Albion Rovers 7–2 Airdrie United (5 November 2011); Arbroath 6–1 Albion Rovers (21 January 2012)
- Biggest away win: East Fife 0–6 Dumbarton (27 August 2011)
- Highest scoring: (9 goals); Albion Rovers 7–2 Airdrie United (5 November 2011)
- Longest winning run: 5 games Arbroath
- Longest unbeaten run: 10 games Arbroath; Dumbarton
- Longest winless run: 10 games Albion Rovers; Forfar Athletic
- Longest losing run: 6 games Stirling Albion
- Highest attendance: 1,490; Airdrie United v Albion Rovers (2 January 2012)
- Lowest attendance: 207; Albion Rovers v Cowdenbeath (3 December 2011)

The 2011–12 Scottish Football League Second Division (also known as the 2011–12 Irn Bru Scottish Football League Second Division for sponsorship reasons) is the 18th season in the current format of 10 teams in the third-tier of Scottish football. Livingston F.C. are the current champions.

== Teams ==
Location of teams in Scottish Second Division 2011–12

As champions of the 2010–11 season, Livingston were directly promoted to the 2011–12 Scottish First Division. They were replaced by Stirling Albion who finished bottom of the 2010–11 Scottish First Division.

A second promotion place was available via a play-off tournament between the ninth-placed team of the 2010–11 Scottish First Division, Cowdenbeath, and the sides ranked second, third and fourth in the 2010–11 Scottish Second Division, Ayr United, Forfar Athletic and Brechin City respectively. The play off was won by Ayr United who defeated Brechin City in the final. Cowdenbeath were therefore relegated and replaced Ayr United.

Peterhead finished bottom at the end of the 2010–11 Scottish Second Division season so were relegated to the 2011–12 Scottish Third Division. They were replaced by Arbroath, the champions of the 2010–11 Scottish Third Division.

The ninth placed team of the 2010–11 Scottish Second Division, Alloa Athletic, entered a play-off tournament with the sides ranked second, third and fourth in the 2010–11 Scottish Third Division, Albion Rovers, Queen's Park and Annan Athletic respectively. The play off was won by Albion Rovers who defeated Annan Athletic in the final. Alloa Athletic were therefore relegated and replaced by Albion Rovers.

=== Stadia and locations ===
| Team | Location | Home ground | Capacity |
|---|---|---|---|
| Airdrie United | Airdrie | New Broomfield | 10,171 |
| Albion Rovers | Coatbridge | Cliftonhill | 2,496 |
| Arbroath | Arbroath | Gayfield Park | 4,153 |
| Brechin City | Brechin | Glebe Park | 1,519 |
| Cowdenbeath | Cowdenbeath | Central Park | 4,370 |
| Dumbarton | Dumbarton | Dumbarton Football Stadium | 2,025 |
| East Fife | Methil | Bayview Stadium | 2,000 |
| Forfar Athletic | Forfar | Station Park | 4,602 |
| Stenhousemuir | Stenhousemuir | Ochilview Park | 3,776 |
| Stirling Albion | Stirling | Doubletree Dunblane Stadium | 3,808 |

=== Personnel and kits ===
Note: Flags indicate national team as has been defined under FIFA eligibility rules. Players may hold more than one non-FIFA nationality.

| Team | Manager | Kit manufacturer | Shirt sponsor |
|---|---|---|---|
| Airdrie United | (Scotland) Jimmy Boyle | Surridge | St Andrew's Hospice |
| Albion Rovers | (Scotland) Paul Martin | Macron | Reigart |
| Arbroath | (Scotland) Paul Sheerin | Pendle | Ogstons |
| Brechin City | (Scotland) Jim Weir | Pendle | Cancer Research UK |
| Cowdenbeath | (Scotland) Colin Cameron | Umbro | Subsea |
| Dumbarton | (Scotland) Alan Adamson | Surridge | Bet Butler |
| East Fife | (Scotland) John Robertson | 1903 (clubs own brand) | Cogen Energy |
| Forfar Athletic | (Scotland) Dick Campbell | Pendle | Orchard Timber Products |
| Stenhousemuir | (Scotland) Davie Irons | Hummel | Figure 11 Communications |
| Stirling Albion | (Scotland) Jocky Scott | Puma | Prudential plc |

== League table ==
| Pos | Team | Pld | W | D | L | GF | GA | GD | Pts | Promotion, qualification or relegation |
|---|---|---|---|---|---|---|---|---|---|---|
| 1 | Cowdenbeath (C, P) | 36 | 20 | 11 | 5 | 68 | 29 | +39 | 71 | Promotion to the First Division |
| 2 | Arbroath | 36 | 17 | 12 | 7 | 76 | 51 | +25 | 63 | Qualification for the First Division play-offs |
| 3 | Dumbarton (O, P) | 36 | 17 | 7 | 12 | 61 | 61 | 0 | 58 (Note: Dumbarton won the First Division play-off final, and were promoted to the First Division.) | Qualification for the First Division play-offs |
| 4 | Airdrie United (P) | 36 | 14 | 10 | 12 | 68 | 60 | +8 | 52 (Note: Airdrie United lost the final of the First Division playoffs to Dumbarton. However following the demotion of Rangers to the third division prior to the beginning of the 2012-13 season, Dundee were promoted from the First Division to the SPL, and Airdrie United were promoted to the First Division to take their place. Stranraer were promoted from the Third to the Second Division to take the place of Airdrie United) | Qualification for the First Division play-offs |
| 5 | Stenhousemuir | 36 | 15 | 6 | 15 | 54 | 49 | +5 | 51 | |
| 6 | East Fife | 36 | 14 | 6 | 16 | 55 | 57 | −2 | 48 | |
| 7 | Forfar Athletic | 36 | 11 | 9 | 16 | 59 | 72 | −13 | 42 | |
| 8 | Brechin City | 36 | 10 | 11 | 15 | 47 | 62 | −15 | 41 | |
| 9 | Albion Rovers (O) | 36 | 10 | 7 | 19 | 43 | 66 | −23 | 37 | Qualification for Second Division play-offs |
| 10 | Stirling Albion (R) | 36 | 9 | 7 | 20 | 46 | 70 | −24 | 34 | Relegation to the Third Division |

Source: SPFL Archive
Rules for classification: 1) points; 2) goal difference; 3) number of goals scored.
(C) Champions; (O) Play-off winners; (P) Promoted; (R) Relegated

== Results ==
=== First half of season ===
| Home \ Away | AIR | ALB | ARB | BRE | COW | DUM | EFI | FOR | STE | STI |
|---|---|---|---|---|---|---|---|---|---|---|
| Airdrie United | | 4–0 | 3–3 | 2–3 | 1–5 | 3–0 | 1–3 | 4–4 | 5–2 | 1–1 |
| Albion Rovers | 7–2 | | 1–0 | 1–2 | 3–3 | 3–1 | 0–3 | 1–0 | 1–1 | 0–1 |
| Arbroath | 3–1 | 6–2 | | 1–1 | 1–1 | 4–3 | 3–0 | 4–1 | 1–0 | 4–2 |
| Brechin City | 1–1 | 1–4 | 2–3 | | 1–0 | 3–3 | 0–2 | 0–1 | 2–0 | 1–3 |
| Cowdenbeath | 2–0 | 2–1 | 0–0 | 3–1 | | 0–0 | 3–2 | 3–1 | 2–0 | 2–0 |
| Dumbarton | 1–1 | 2–1 | 3–4 | 1–0 | 0–4 | | 3–0 | 1–1 | 3–0 | 1–5 |
| East Fife | 2–0 | 2–0 | 2–2 | 1–1 | 1–3 | 0–6 | | 4–3 | 1–3 | 1–0 |
| Forfar Athletic | 3–2 | 0–2 | 1–1 | 0–0 | 2–2 | 0–2 | 3–2 | | 2–3 | 2–2 |
| Stenhousemuir | 1–1 | 3–0 | 2–0 | 1–1 | 3–1 | 3–1 | 2–1 | 2–3 | | 4–0 |
| Stirling Albion | 1–4 | 2–2 | 0–1 | 1–0 | 1–1 | 0–1 | 1–0 | 2–4 | 2–2 | |

Updated to match(es) played on 14 January 2012. Source: BBC Sport
Legend: Blue = home team win; Yellow = draw; Red = away team win.

=== Second half of season ===
| Home \ Away | AIR | ALB | ARB | BRE | COW | DUM | EFI | FOR | STE | STI |
|---|---|---|---|---|---|---|---|---|---|---|
| Airdrie United | | 1–0 | 2–0 | 4–1 | 1–1 | 2–3 | 2–0 | 3–0 | 0–3 | 4–1 |
| Albion Rovers | 0–1 | | 1–1 | 0–1 | 1–0 | 1–1 | 1–1 | 2–2 | 1–0 | 1–2 |
| Arbroath | 2–2 | 6–1 | | 2–3 | 1–1 | 2–0 | 2–2 | 0–1 | 0–2 | 2–0 |
| Brechin City | 1–1 | 2–1 | 1–1 | | 2–2 | 2–2 | 1–3 | 2–1 | 1–0 | 1–2 |
| Cowdenbeath | 0–0 | 3–0 | 2–3 | 1–0 | | 4–1 | 4–0 | 2–0 | 0–0 | 4–1 |
| Dumbarton | 2–1 | 1–0 | 3–2 | 4–2 | 0–2 | | 0–4 | 1–0 | 0–2 | 4–1 |
| East Fife | 2–0 | 1–2 | 1–3 | 2–2 | 0–1 | 1–2 | | 4–0 | 1–1 | 1–0 |
| Forfar Athletic | 2–3 | 4–0 | 2–4 | 4–1 | 1–0 | 1–1 | 1–4 | | 1–2 | 4–3 |
| Stenhousemuir | 0–3 | 1–2 | 1–3 | 2–1 | 0–2 | 1–2 | 1–0 | 1–2 | | 4–0 |
| Stirling Albion | 0–2 | 3–0 | 1–1 | 2–3 | 0–2 | 1–2 | 0–1 | 2–2 | 3–1 | |

Updated to match(es) played on 5 May 2012. Source: BBC Sport
Legend: Blue = home team win; Yellow = draw; Red = away team win.

== Second Division play-offs ==
Times are BST (UTC+1)

=== Semi-finals ===
The fourth placed team in the Third Division (Elgin City ) will play the ninth placed team in the Second Division ( Albion Rovers ) and third placed team in the Third Division (Stranraer ) will play the second placed team in the Third Division (Queen's Park ). The play-offs will be played over two legs, the winning team in each semi-final will advance to the final.

| Team 1 | Agg. | Team 2 | 1st leg | 2nd leg |
|---|---|---|---|---|
| Elgin City | 1–2 | Albion Rovers | 1–0 | 0–2 |
| Stranraer | 5–1 | Queen's Park | 3–1 | 2–0 |

First legs

9 May
7:45 pm

| Elgin City | 1–0 | Albion Rovers |
|---|---|---|
| Millar 53' | BBC Sport | O'Byrne (red card) 29' |

Borough Briggs
Attendance: 1,248
Referee: Frank McDermott

9 May
7:45 pm

| Stranraer | 3–1 | Queen's Park |
|---|---|---|
| Winter 17', 68'; Malcolm 22' | BBC Sport | Quinn 48' |

Stair Park
Attendance: 481
Referee: Bobby Madden

Second legs

12 May
3:00 pm

| Albion Rovers | 2–0 | Elgin City |
|---|---|---|
| Gemmell 62'; Chaplain 90' | BBC Sport |

Cliftonhill
Attendance: 827
Referee: John McKendrick

12 May
3:00 pm

| Queen's Park | 0–2 | Stranraer |
|---|---|---|
| | BBC Sport | Malcolm 12'; Grehan 20' |

Hampden Park
Attendance: 1,188
Referee: David Somers

=== Final ===
The two semi-final winners will play each other over two legs. The winning team will be awarded a place in the 2012–13 Second Division. However, in July 2012, following discussions as a result of the sale of Rangers FC in administration to Charles Green, the result was moot; both teams were awarded a place in the Second Division.

| Team 1 | Agg. | Team 2 | 1st leg | 2nd leg |
|---|---|---|---|---|
| Stranraer | 3–3 (3–5 pens.) | Albion Rovers | 2–0 | 1–3 |

First leg

16 May 2012
7:45 pm

| Stranraer | 2–0 | Albion Rovers |
|---|---|---|
| McKeown 39'; Moore 90' | BBC Sport |

Stair Park
Attendance: 506
Referee: Stevie O'Reilly

Second leg

20 May 2012
3:00 pm

| Albion Rovers | 3–1 (5–3 pens.) (a.e.t.) | Stranraer |
|---|---|---|
| Chaplain 6', 33' (pen.); Love 25' | BBC Sport | 27' Grehan |

Cliftonhill
Attendance: 1,008
Referee: Brian Winter

== Statistics ==
=== Top goalscorers ===
As of 21 April 2012 (GMT)

| Pos | Player | Club | Goals |
|---|---|---|---|
| 1 | (Scotland) Steven Doris | Arbroath | 21 |
| 2 | (Scotland) Ryan Donnelly | Airdrie United | 20 |
| 2 | (Scotland) Ryan Wallace | East Fife | 20 |
| 3 | (Scotland) Marc McKenzie | Cowdenbeath | 17 |
| 4 | (Scotland) Chris Templeman | Forfar Athletic | 16 |
| 5 | (Scotland) Paul McManus | Brechin City | 15 |
| 6 | (Scotland) Bryan Prunty | Dumbarton | 14 |
| 7 | (Scotland) Scott Agnew | Dumbarton | 13 |
| 7 | (Scotland) Lewis Coult | Cowdenbeath | 13 |
| 7 | (Scotland) Andy Rodgers | Stenhousemuir | 13 |
| 8 | (Scotland) Gavin Swankie | Arbroath | 11 |
| 9 | (Scotland) Stewart Kean | Stenhousemuir | 10 |

=== Hat-tricks ===
As of 7 March 2012 14:21 (GMT)

| Player | For | Against | Result | Date |
|---|---|---|---|---|
| (Scotland) Bryan Prunty^{4} | Dumbarton | East Fife | 6–0 | 27 August 2011 |
| (Scotland) Scott Chaplain | Albion Rovers | Airdrie United | 7–2 | 5 November 2011 |
| (Scotland) Ryan Donnelly | Airdrie United | Forfar Athletic | 4–4 | 2 November 2011 |
| (Scotland) Lewis Coult | Cowdenbeath | Stirling Albion | 4–1 | 11 February 2012 |
| (Scotland) Steven Doris | Arbroath | Forfar Athletic | 4–1 | 22 February 2012 |

- ^{4} Player scored 4 goals

== Awards ==
| Month | Second Division Manager of the Month | | SFL Player of the Month | | SFL Young player of the Month | | Ginger Boot | |
| Month | Manager | Club | Player | Club | Player | Club | Player | Club |
|---|---|---|---|---|---|---|---|---|
| August | (Scotland) Paul Sheerin | Arbroath | First division player | | First division player | | Third division player | |
| September | (Scotland) Colin Cameron | Cowdenbeath | First division player | | (Scotland) Mark Ridgers | East Fife | First division player | |
| October | (Scotland) John Robertson | East Fife | First division player | | First division player | | (Scotland) Ryan Donnelly | Airdrie United |
| November | (Scotland) Colin Cameron | Cowdenbeath | First division player | | (Scotland) Ryan Donnelly | Airdrie United | Third division player | |
| December | (Scotland) Jim Weir | Brechin City | First division player | | Third division player | | Third division player | |
| January | (Scotland) Alan Adamson | Dumbarton | Third division player | | Third division player | | Third division player | |
| February | (Scotland) Alan Adamson | Dumbarton | (Scotland) Steven Doris | Arbroath | First division player | | (Scotland) Lewis Coult | Cowdenbeath |
| March | | | | | | | | |
| April | | | | | | | | |
