= Sean Lynch (footballer) =

Scottish footballer

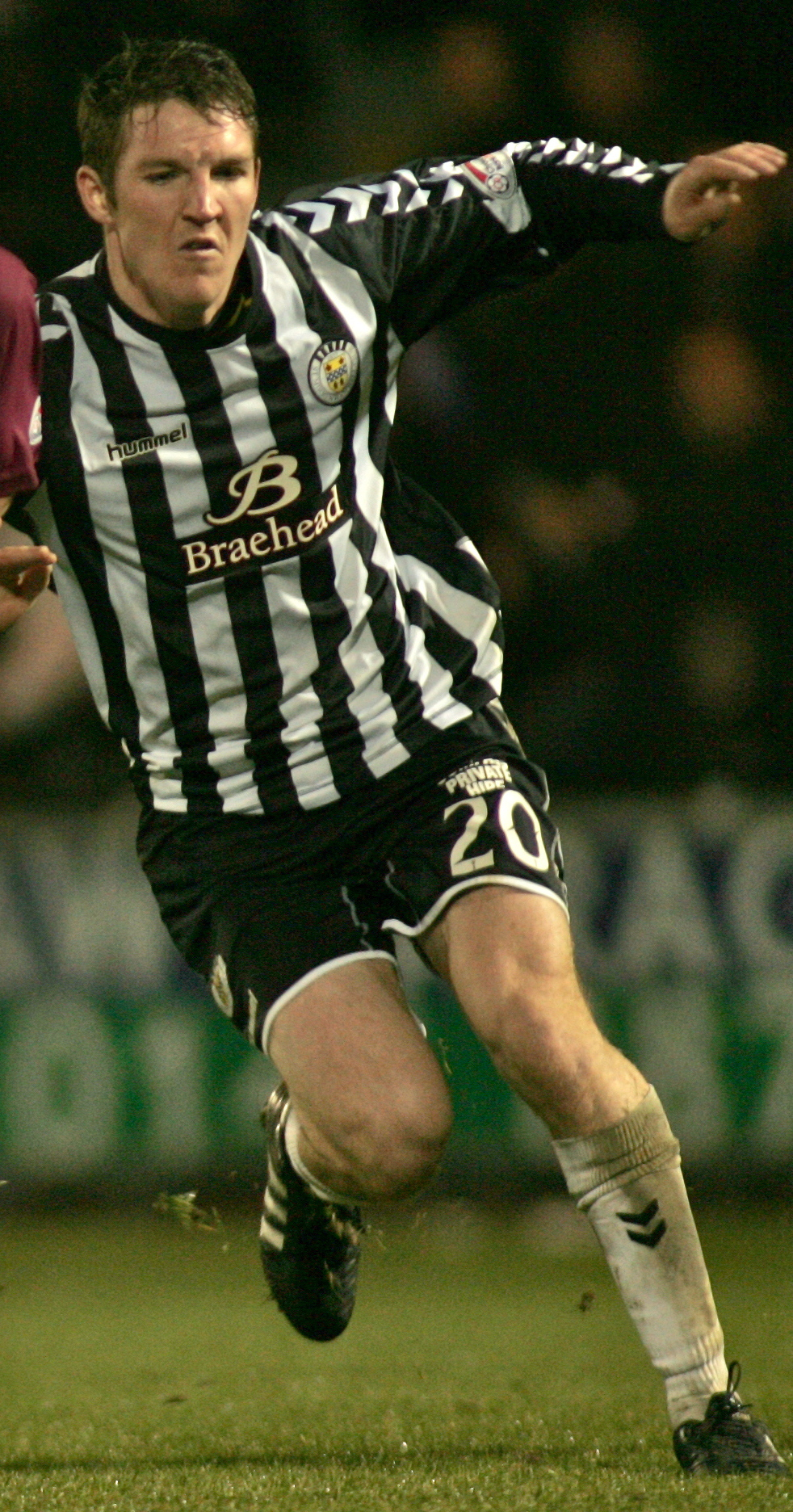
- Lynch playing for St Mirren in 2010

Personal information
- Date of birth: 31 January 1987 (age 39)
- Place of birth: Dechmont, Scotland
- Position: Midfielder

Senior career*
Years	Team	Apps	(Gls)
2006–2008	Hibernian	5	(0)
2008	→ St Johnstone (loan)	1	(0)
2008–2010	Falkirk	10	(0)
2010–2011	St Mirren	14	(2)
2011–2013	Airdrie United	48	(7)
2013–2014	Stenhousemuir	30	(3)
- * Club domestic league appearances and goals as of 20:10, 20 November 2015 (UTC)

Sean Lynch (born 31 January 1987) is a Scottish former professional footballer who played as a midfielder.

== Playing career ==
=== Hibernian ===
Born in Dechmont, West Lothian, Lynch made his first-team debut for Hibernian against Kilmarnock on 5 April 2006, replacing Abdessalam Benjelloun for the final minute of a 2–1 win at Easter Road. He made just one more substitute appearance that season and did not play again until 3 February 2007, and on 21 April that year he was given a straight red card for a foul on Chris Clark, with teammate Dermot McCaffrey also dismissed in the 2–2 draw with Aberdeen at Pittodrie. He did not feature at all for Hibs during the 2007–08 season and was sent on an emergency loan to First Division St Johnstone in February. He was returned to Hibs after being injured in his first game for Saints, a 3–2 Tayside derby defeat away to Dundee on 1 March.

While playing for Hibernian Lynch was also a member of the Scottish U-20 national team, playing in the 2007 FIFA U-20 World Cup in Canada.

=== Falkirk ===
Lynch was released by Hibs manager Mixu Paatelainen in August 2008, and signed for fellow SPL club Falkirk a month later. He made his debut on 27 September in a 4–1 win against Hamilton Academical, replacing Graham Barrett for the final 15 minutes. Lynch was released by Falkirk after the club was relegated from the Scottish Premier League in May 2010.

=== St Mirren ===
Following a trial spell, Lynch signed for St Mirren in July 2010. He made his league debut for the club in a 1–1 draw against Dundee United on 14 August, and scored a volley from the edge of the penalty area. He made 14 appearances over the season for the Buddies, scoring one more goal, a consolation in a 2–1 loss at St Johnstone on 18 September.

=== Airdrie United ===
Lynch signed for Airdrie United of the Second Division in July 2011.

=== Stenhousemuir ===
He left Airdrie in May 2013 and subsequently signed for Stenhousemuir. Lynch scored the winning penalty in a shootout against Dundee that allowed Stenhousemuir to progress to the semi-finals of the 2013–14 Scottish Challenge Cup. Lynch was released by Stenhousemuir in May 2014.

== Business career ==
Lynch created a mobile app named Socizer; in 2011 he received a local Business Excellence Award by the Prince's Scottish Youth Business Trust. He co-owns a t-shirt business with Scott Arfield, a former colleague at Falkirk.
