= Gary Mackay-Steven =

Scottish association football player

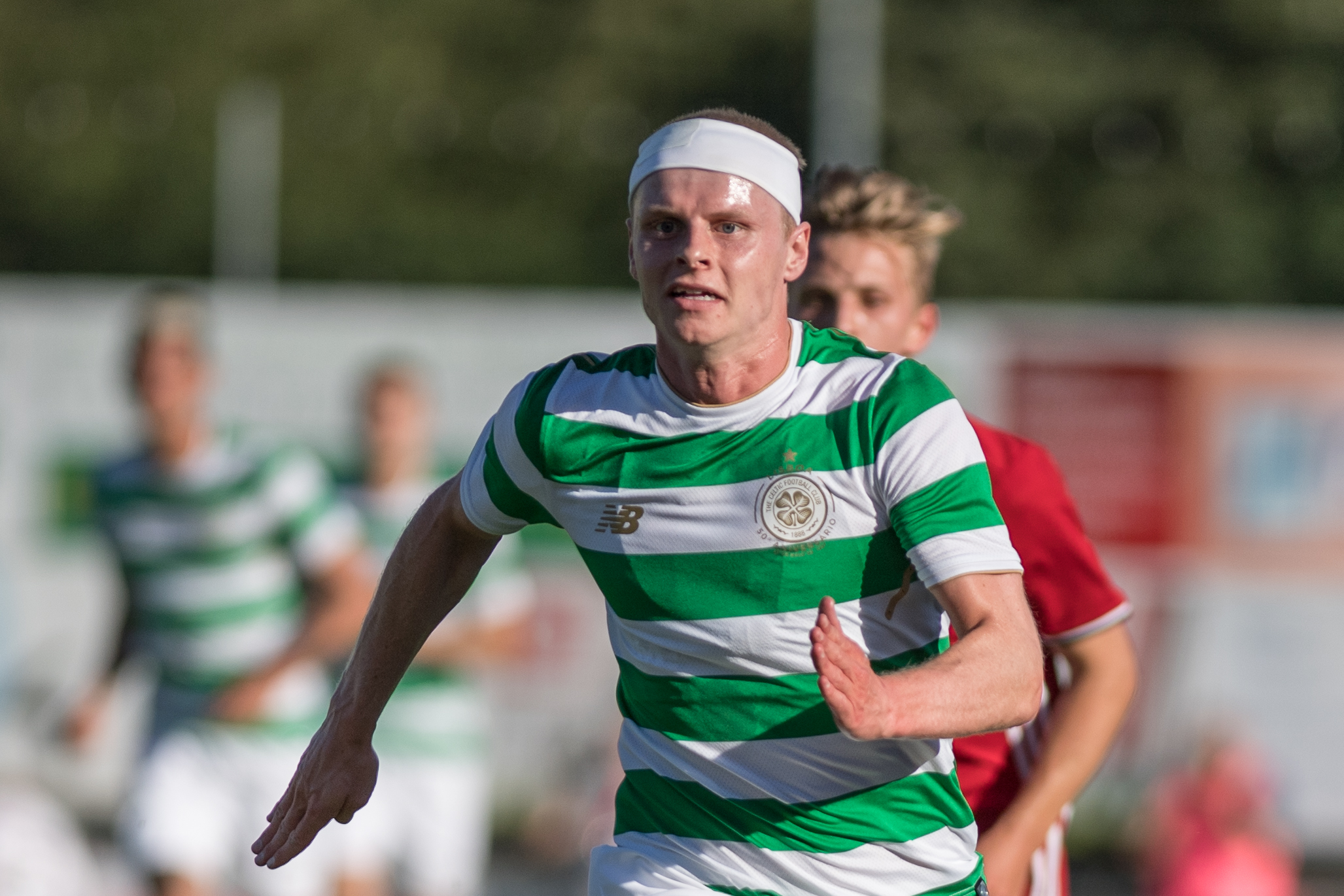
- Mackay-Steven playing for Celtic in 2017

Personal information
- Full name: Gary Sean Mackay-Steven
- Date of birth: 31 August 1990 (age 36)
- Place of birth: Thurso, Scotland
- Height: 5 ft 8 in (1.73 m)
- Position: Winger

Team information
- Current team: Partick Thistle
- Number: 11

Youth career
- Ross County
- 2007–2009: Liverpool
- 2009–2011: Fulham

Senior career*
Years	Team	Apps	(Gls)
2011	Airdrie United	19	(0)
2011–2015	Dundee United	110	(21)
2015–2017	Celtic	46	(8)
2017–2019	Aberdeen	51	(9)
2019–2020	New York City	35	(3)
2021–2023	Heart of Midlothian	53	(6)
2023–2025	Kilmarnock	19	(1)
2025–2026	Ross County	16	(0)
2026–	Partick Thistle	11	(0)

International career^{‡}
2012	Scotland U21	3	(1)
2013–2018	Scotland	2	(0)
- * Club domestic league appearances and goals as of 18:34, 21 November 2026 (UTC) ‡ National team caps and goals as of 14 December 2021

Gary Sean Mackay-Steven (born 31 August 1990) is a Scottish professional footballer who plays as a winger for Scottish Championship club Partick Thistle

Having not made the first team at English clubs Liverpool and Fulham, he began his professional career with Airdrie United in January 2011, spending half a season there before moving to top-flight team Dundee United. He remained with Dundee United until February 2015, when he was signed by Celtic for £250,000. He joined Aberdeen in 2017, and later moved to New York City FC when his contract expired in July 2019. Mackay-Steven returned to Scottish football in 2021 with Heart of Midlothian.

Mackay-Steven has made two full international appearances for Scotland.

== Club career ==
=== Early career ===
Born in Thurso, Caithness, Mackay-Steven began his youth career with Ross County before moving to English Premier League side Liverpool in 2007. After spending two years in the reserve and youth sides, Mackay-Steven was released after an injury-plagued season. He trained with Fulham before eventually returning to Scotland.

=== Airdrie United ===
On 11 January 2011, Mackay-Steven joined Scottish Second Division side Airdrie United. He made his debut a week later in the fourth round of the Scottish Cup, starting against Greenock Morton at Cappielow Park and scoring the opening goal of a 2–2 draw from 25 yards out. A week later, in the replay at the Excelsior Stadium, Mackay-Steven scored again, albeit in a 5–2 defeat. He played 19 league matches in the remainder of the season, but did not score.

=== Dundee United ===
On 13 July 2011, Mackay-Steven signed a two-year deal with Scottish Premier League club Dundee United. He made his debut eight days later as an 80th-minute substitute for Johnny Russell in a UEFA Europa League match against Śląsk Wrocław, which his club won 3–2 but were nonetheless eliminated on the away goals rule. On 24 July, he made his league debut for the club on the opening day of the season, coming on for Barry Douglas for the last 30 minutes of a 1–1 draw against Kilmarnock at Tannadice Park. On 29 August, Mackay-Steven scored his first goal for the club (and his first career league goal), netting in the 3–3 draw at St Johnstone. By the end of the 2011–12 season, Mackay-Steven had established a regular starting place in the first team and become a huge fans' favourite thanks to his large role in helping turn around United's poor start to the season. Mackay-Steven signed an extended contract with the club in January 2012.

Blackburn Rovers scouts were reported to have been watching Mackay-Steven on 24 August 2013, in Dundee United's 4–0 victory over St Johnstone, a game in which he scored. On 12 April 2014, he scored Dundee United's second goal in a 3–1 win against Rangers in the Scottish Cup semi–final at Ibrox. In the final on 17 May, he started in a 2–0 defeat to St Johnstone at Celtic Park, being substituted for Ryan Gauld after 64 minutes.

He scored twice as Dundee United won the Dundee derby 6–2 against Dundee on 1 January 2015.

=== Celtic ===
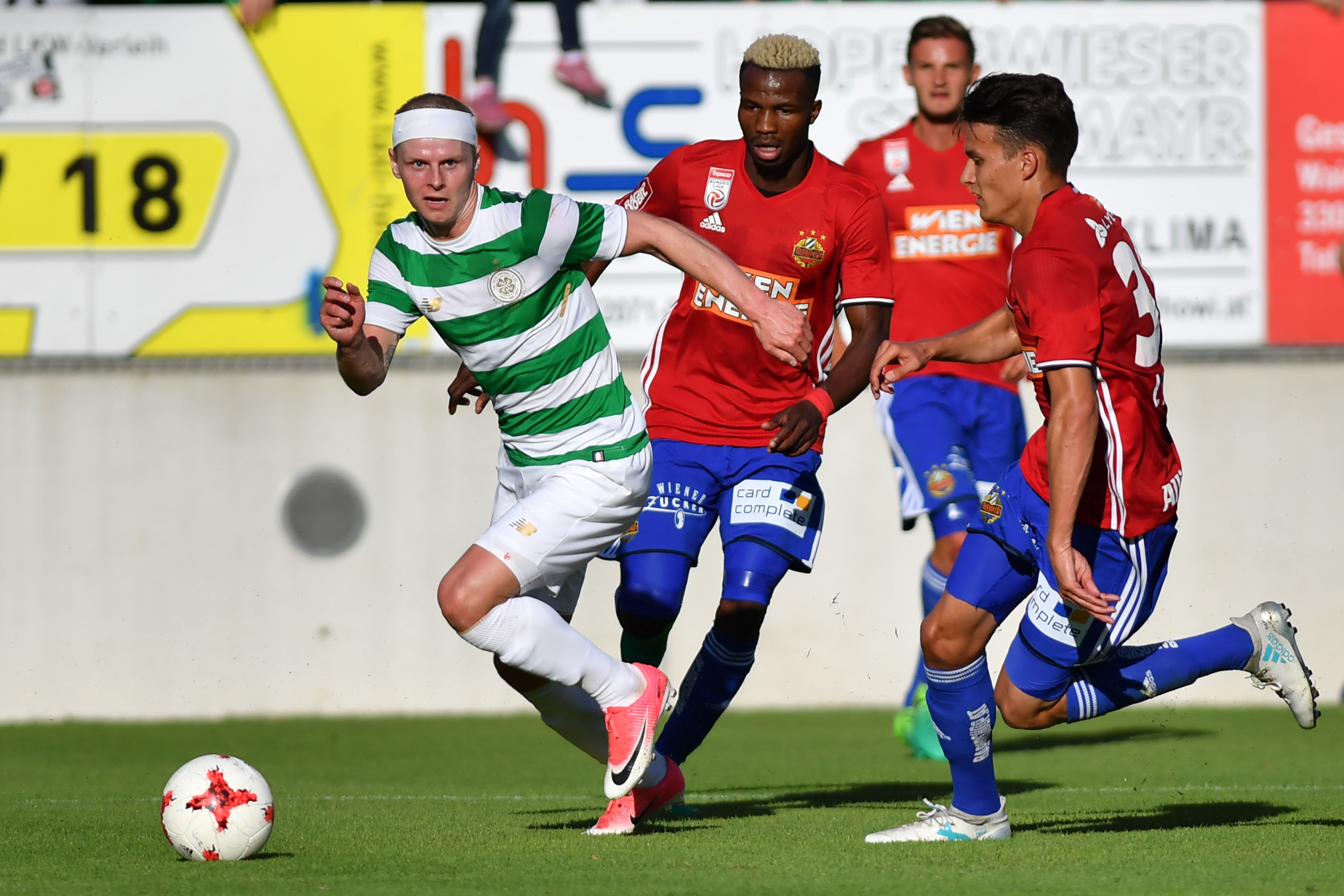
Mackay-Steven in action in a friendly against Rapid Vienna in July 2017

On 16 January 2015, Mackay-Steven signed a pre-contract agreement to join Celtic at the end of the season on the expiry of his Dundee United contract. In the January transfer window, he had been pursued by Nigel Clough, manager of English League One club Sheffield United, who made three bids up to £100,000 while Dundee United wanted a minimum of £250,000. On the transfer deadline day, 2 February, Celtic made an offer of £250,000 and the move was completed immediately, with his Dundee United teammate Stuart Armstrong joining in a separate deal at the same time. Five days later, the pair watched from the stands as Celtic won 2–0 at Dundee in the fifth round of the Scottish Cup.

Mackay-Steven made his debut on 11 February away to Partick Thistle, scoring after 37 seconds in a 3–0 victory. His first goal at Celtic Park came on 1 March as the third in a 4–0 win over Aberdeen, with a shot from 20 yards. On 15 March Celtic won the Scottish League Cup final against Dundee United, but Mackay-Steven was cup-tied, having already represented Dundee United in the tournament that season.

=== Aberdeen ===
On 12 July 2017, Mackay-Steven signed a two-year contract with Aberdeen for an undisclosed fee. He made his debut the following day in a UEFA Europa League second qualifying round first leg at home to NK Široki Brijeg, starting in a 1–1 draw. In the second leg in Bosnia a week after, he scored to wrap up a 2–0 win and advancement.

Mackay-Steven scored his first league goal for Aberdeen on 14 October, the only one of a victory at Hibernian. On 16 December, against the same opponents, he scored his first senior hat-trick in a 4–1 win. Mackay-Steven won the Scottish Cup Goal of the Fourth round award for his strike in the 4–1 win against St Mirren.

In the 2018 Scottish League Cup final against former club Celtic on 2 December 2018, Mackay-Steven was stretchered from the field after being knocked unconscious by a clash of heads with Dedryck Boyata shortly before the end of the first half (Aberdeen lost 1–0). He was released from hospital after a few days and returned to playing towards the end of January 2019.

=== New York City FC ===
On 24 June 2019, Mackay-Steven joined Major League Soccer side New York City on a free transfer, effective from the start of the league's transfer window on 9 July. He made his debut on 14 July during the Hudson River Derby away to the New York Red Bulls as an 84th-minute substitute for Valentín Castellanos in a 2–1 loss. He scored his first goal on his 29th birthday on 31 August in a 3–1 win at Vancouver Whitecaps FC, after replacing the injured Héber.

Following their 2020 season, Mackay-Steven departed the club after New York City opted to decline their contract option for Mackay-Steven.

=== Heart of Midlothian ===
On 8 January 2021, Mackay-Steven returned to Scotland to sign with Heart of Midlothian on a deal to run until the summer of 2023.

Mackay-Steven only made six appearances for Hearts during the 2022–23 season, as he suffered a foot injury in December. Hearts announced in May that Mackay-Steven would leave the club at the end of the season, although he was allowed the use of their facilities as he recovered from the foot injury.

=== Kilmarnock ===
Mackay-Steven started training with Kilmarnock during October 2023, and he signed a short-term contract with the club in December.

=== Partick Thistle ===
In March 2026, Mackay-Steven signed a short term deal with Scottish Championship club Partick Thistle until the end of the season.

Mackay-Steven made his Thistle debut, coming off the bench in a 2–0 home win over Dunfermline Athletic in the Scottish Championship.

MacKay-Steven signed a one year contract extension with Thistle in June 2026.

MacKay-Steven scored his first and second goal for Thistle in a 6–0 home win over Brechin City in a Scottish League Cup group stage tie.

== International career ==
Mackay-Steven made his first international appearance for Scotland on 15 November 2013, replacing Craig Conway for the last six minutes of a goalless friendly draw against the United States at Hampden Park.

He was recalled to the Scotland squad in October 2018, for a friendly against Portugal. He came on as a substitute in the 67th minute, and assisted Steven Naismith in scoring Scotland's only goal of the game.

== Personal life ==
On 27 August 2017, Mackay-Steven was rescued from the River Kelvin in Glasgow after falling in. He was taken to Queen Elizabeth University Hospital where he was treated for hypothermia.

== Career statistics ==
As of match played 18 May 2025

Appearances and goals by club, season and competition
Club	Season	League			National Cup		League Cup		Other		Total	
Club	Season	Division	Apps	Goals	Apps	Goals	Apps	Goals	Apps	Goals	Apps	Goals
Airdrie United	2010–11	Scottish Second Division	19	0	2	2	0	0	0	0	21	2
Dundee United	2011–12	Scottish Premier League	31	4	3	1	1	0	1 (Note: Appearances in the Europa League)	0	36	5
Dundee United	2012–13	Scottish Premier League	23	5	3	2	1	0	2	0	29	7
Dundee United	2013–14	Scottish Premiership	35	7	5	3	1	0	–		41	10
Dundee United	2014–15	Scottish Premiership	21	5	1	0	3	0	–		25	5
Dundee United	Total		110	21	12	6	6	0	3	0	131	27
Celtic	2014–15	Scottish Premiership	13	4	0	0	0	0	2	0	15	4
Celtic	2015–16	Scottish Premiership	25	4	3	1	2	1	7 (Note: Five appearances in the Champions League and two in the Europa League)	0	37	6
Celtic	2016–17	Scottish Premiership	8	0	1	0	0	0	1 (Note: Appearance in the Champions League)	0	10	0
Celtic	Total		46	8	4	1	2	1	10	0	62	10
Aberdeen	2017–18	Scottish Premiership	31	5	5	3	2	0	4	1	42	9
Aberdeen	2018–19	Scottish Premiership	20	4	4	0	4	2	2	1	30	7
Aberdeen	Total		51	9	9	3	6	2	6	2	72	16
New York City	2019	Major League Soccer	12	1	0	0	—		—		12	1
New York City	2020	Major League Soccer	23	2	0	0	0	0	2 (Note: Appearances in the 2020 MLS is Back Tournament)	0	25	2
New York City	Total		35	3	0	0	0	0	2	0	37	3
Heart of Midlothian	2020–21	Scottish Championship	17	4	1	0	0	0	—		18	4
Heart of Midlothian	2021–22	Scottish Premiership	32	2	3	0	5	2	—		40	4
Heart of Midlothian	2022–23	Scottish Premiership	4	0	0	0	1	0	1	0	6	0
Heart of Midlothian	Total		53	6	4	0	6	2	1	0	64	8
Kilmarnock	2023–24	Scottish Premiership	9	1	1	0	—		—		10	1
Kilmarnock	2024–25	Scottish Premiership	10	0	0	0	1	0	2	0	13	0
Kilmarnock	Total		19	1	1	0	1	0	2	0	23	1
Career Total			333	48	31	12	21	5	24	2	409	67

== Honours ==
Celtic

- Scottish Premiership: 2014–15, 2015–16, 2016–17
- Scottish League Cup: 2016–17
