= Ross Dunlop =

New Zealand local-body politician

Ross James Craufurd Dunlop MNZM (born 1954 or 1955) is a New Zealand local-body politician. He was mayor of the South Taranaki District from 2007 to 2019. In December 2024, Dunlop was appointed a Member of the New Zealand Order of Merit, for services to local government.

== Political career ==
A farmer with interests in dairy, sheep, beef and forestry, Dunlop served 33 years in local government. He was first elected to the Hawera District Council in 1986. The South Taranaki District was formed in 1989 and Dunlop was elected as a councillor to the new council. He was chairman of the Hawera Community Board and then went onto chair the Environment and Hearing Committee. He chaired a number of hearing applications including the consent for the Kupe oil and gas production station. He served with Mayor Mary Bourke and when she stood down in 2007 he stood for the mayoralty. He won against seven candidates. He was re-elected unopposed for a fourth term in 2016.

During Dunlop's term of office, a new multi sport stadium—the Hub—opened. New water treatment facilities for Hāwera, Ōpunake, Pātea, and Waimate West and upgraded water treatment for Eltham and Waverley were commissioned. The Hāwera town centre was a major focus, with a new supermarket and new laneways, and a proposed new library/cultural centre.

Dunlop led the council treaty settlement negotiations with Taranaki iwi and Ngāruahine. Significant council properties were returned to iwi. One of the most important and historic properties, Te Ngutu o Te Manu, was returned to Ngāruahine. Te Ngutu o Te Manu was the home of Ngāruahine chief Tītokowaru, who repelled two attacks by colonial forces on the village in 1868. Major Gustavus von Tempsky was killed in the attack.

== Controversy ==
In November 2018, Dunlop awarded a prize in the Hāwera Christmas parade to the Hawera women's Lions Club float, with a black and white theme. Their blackened faces caused some community offence. Dunlop said that he "wasn't paying much attention" and he apologised.

== Honours and awards ==
In the 2025 New Year Honours, Dunlop was appointed a Member of the New Zealand Order of Merit, for services to local government.
