= Jamie Stevenson (Scottish footballer) =

Scottish footballer (born 1984)

Personal information
- Date of birth: 13 July 1984 (age 42)
- Place of birth: Glasgow, Scotland
- Height: 1.73 m (5 ft 8 in)
- Position: Midfielder

Youth career
- –2001: Aberdeen
- 2001–2002: Alloa Athletic
- 2002: Mallorca (trial)

Senior career*
Years	Team	Apps	(Gls)
2001–2003	Alloa Athletic	2	(0)
2003–2004	Mallorca B	8	(0)
2004–2006	Alloa Athletic	79	(13)
2006–2009	Greenock Morton	58	(10)
2008	→ Alloa Athletic (loan)	16	(2)
2009	→ East Stirlingshire (loan)	15	(4)
2009–2010	East Stirlingshire	49	(15)
2010–2012	Airdrie United	58	(7)
2012–2014	Cowdenbeath	53	(10)
2014–2020	Peterhead	173	(19)
2020–2021	Kelty Hearts	12	(2)
2021–2022	East Kilbride		
2022–2023	Berwick Rangers	40	(2)
- * Club domestic league appearances and goals as of 16:40, 10 December 2023 (UTC)

James Stevenson (born 13 July 1984) is a Scottish footballer who plays as a full back or midfielder.

After spending a year in Spain with the reserve team of Real Mallorca as a teenager, he spent all of his career in the lower divisions of Scottish football, playing for various clubs including Alloa Athletic (three spells), Greenock Morton, East Stirlingshire, Airdrie United, Cowdenbeath, Peterhead, and Kelty Hearts.

== Career ==
=== Early years and Mallorca ===
Stevenson began his career with Scottish Premier League club Aberdeen. He was released because they believed he was too small to make the grade in professional football. From there he dropped down the leagues and joined Alloa Athletic while training to become a mechanic.

It was after just two first team appearances with the club that Stevenson's life was turned upside down. In what has been described as a 'Roy of the Rovers' moment he was spotted playing a game of football with his uncle on the Spanish island of Mallorca. A scout from Spanish La Liga side Real Mallorca approached Stevenson and offered him a trial. Stevenson made such an impression in this trial that he was offered a 3-year contract.

Stevenson only lasted just over a year at the Son Moix stadium; in his time in Spain he did not make a first team appearance but was a regular in the B side, for whom he scored a goal on his debut. Real Mallorca were keen to hold on to Stevenson and part of his release stated that he could only return to his former club Alloa, which he did in February 2004.

=== Return to Scotland ===
In season 2005–06 he was a star man for Alloa Athletic almost single-handedly keeping them in the Second Division via the end of season 2nd Division/3rd Division playoffs. His form alerted several larger clubs but to many people's surprise he chose to sign a pre-contract agreement with Greenock Morton, a club who were in the same division as Alloa. Morton agreed to pay Alloa a nominal sum believed to be in the region of £16,000.

In July 2008, he moved to Alloa Athletic for a third spell after joining the second division club on loan from Morton. On Hogmanay 2008 his loan spell expired, so he returned to Morton with only six-months to earn himself a new contract at the club.

In the January 2009 transfer window, Stevenson rejoined Jim McInally at his new club East Stirlingshire on loan until the end of the season. It was announced that Stevenson would be released after the end of the 2008–09 season, this was confirmed by Davie Irons on 8 May in the Greenock Telegraph.

On 9 July 2009, Stevenson signed permanently for the Shire. He was released at the end of the 2009–10 season but re-signed on a one-month short-term contract at the start of the following season. There was talk of Stevenson joining up with ex-Morton defender Ryan Harding again on the Mediterranean island of Malta to play for league champions Birkirkara – this however did not materialise.

On 16 September 2010, he signed on a contract with Airdrie United until the end of the season. Following the expiry of his contract at Airdrie United he went on trial at SPL club Inverness Caledonian Thistle however he remained unsigned and returned to Airdrie in August 2011.

In June 2012, Stevenson signed for Cowdenbeath to play in the First Division. After two seasons with Cowdenbeath, he signed for Peterhead.

Kelty Hearts announced the signing of Stevenson on 5 September 2020.

Stevenson signed with East Kilbride on 9 June 2021.

== Honours ==
Greenock Morton

- Scottish Second Division: 1

2006–07
