= John Boyle (footballer, born 1986) =

Scottish footballer

Personal information
- Date of birth: 22 October 1986 (age 40)
- Position: Striker

Youth career
- Townhead Amateurs
- Raith Rovers

Senior career*
Years	Team	Apps	(Gls)
2003–2005	Raith Rovers	17	(0)
2005	→ East Fife (loan)	10	(0)
2008–2009	Stirling Albion	11	(0)
- Auchinleck Talbot
2011–2015	Airdrieonians	52	(15)
- * Club domestic league appearances and goals as of 09:58, 9 July 2019 (UTC)

John Boyle (born 22 October 1986) is a Scottish footballer who played for Airdrieonians, as a striker. He formerly played for Townhead Amateurs, Raith Rovers, Stirling Albion and Auchinleck Talbot. Boyle captained Airdrie, and was attacked in October 2014 by a fan after a game in which he did not play. After leaving Airdrie in 2015 he was linked with a return to Junior football with Pollok.
