= Graeme Owens =

English footballer

Personal information
- Full name: Graeme Adam Owens
- Date of birth: 1 June 1988 (age 38)
- Place of birth: Cramlington, England
- Position: Right winger

Senior career*
Years	Team	Apps	(Gls)
2007–2009	Middlesbrough	0	(0)
2008	→ Chesterfield (loan)	4	(0)
2009	→ Blackpool (loan)	8	(0)
2009–2011	Kilmarnock	6	(0)
2011–2012	Airdrie United	21	(6)
Total		39	(6)
- * Club domestic league appearances and goals

Graeme Adam Owens (born 1 June 1988) is an English former professional footballer.

== Career ==
Owens can play on either wing but prefers to play on the right. He was a member of Middlesbrough's FA Youth Cup winning side of 2004 at the age of 15.

After good performances for the reserve team, he was included in the first team squad for the trip to Bristol City in the FA Cup, and although he didn't make the final sixteen, manager Gareth Southgate suggested he was one to watch for the future.

Owens made his full debut in the League Cup against Tottenham Hotspur during the 2007–08 season.

In 2008, he spent a short spell on loan at Chesterfield where he played four league games. On 8 January 2009, he signed for Championship club Blackpool on loan initially for one month, but with an option to extend it until the end of the season. He made his debut for the Seasiders as an 83rd-minute substitute in a 2–1 defeat to Coventry City at the Ricoh Arena on 17 January.

It was announced on 15 June 2009 that Owens had joined Scottish Premier League side Kilmarnock on a two-year deal.

After failing to make an impact at Kilmarnock, Owens was released on 31 January 2011. Owens joined Airdrie United on 3 March 2011. He was released by the club in May 2012.
