= Gary Muir =

Scottish footballer

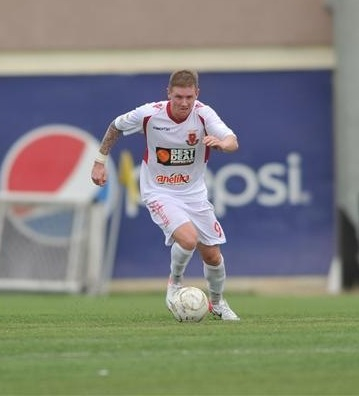
- Muir playing for Vittoriosa Stars in 2012

Personal information
- Date of birth: 15 December 1985 (age 40)
- Place of birth: Glasgow, Scotland
- Positions: Midfielder; full back

Team information
- Current team: St Cadoc's Y.C.

Youth career
- Partick Thistle
- Greenock Morton
- 2005–2006: Louisburg College
- 2007–2008: University of Hartford

Senior career*
Years	Team	Apps	(Gls)
2008	Stirling Albion	17	(0)
2008–2009	Lisburn Distillery	38	(13)
2009	Clyde	19	(1)
2010	Ballymena United	17	(2)
2010–2011	Airdrie United	22	(2)
2011–2012	Antigua	25	(5)
2012–2013	Vittoriosa Stars	39	(14)
2013–2015	Floriana	54	(12)
2015–2016	Sliema Wanderers	50	(1)
2017	Birkirkara	3	(0)
2017–2018	Gżira United	20	(1)
2018–2019	Glenavon	10	(1)
- * Club domestic league appearances and goals

Gary Muir (born 15 December 1985) is a Scottish professional footballer, who plays for St Cadoc's Y.C.

== United States ==
After playing in Scotland during his teenage years, Muir moved to the United States to develop his playing career and was uniquely awarded a 100% scholarship fund. A successful four years in the USA began as Captain of the Louisburg College Hurricanes for two seasons in North Carolina, leading to Captaincy at the University of Hartford in Connecticut.

In 2005, he was awarded All-American status in the NJCAA, named in the Division I All-Region team, and also selected for the Mid-Atlantic district team. Muir took the Hurricanes to the semi-finals in the NJCAA Championships and received the Regional Player of the Year Award, as well as being named the Most Valuable Player of the season.

In 2006, Muir signed for the University of Hartford by Ex-Portugal, Benfica and Porto coach Dan Gaspar at the US National College Championships. 2006 saw Muir playing in all 17 games, scoring three goals and assisting on six occasions. He was also named Most Valuable Player at the Hartwick College Invitational.

== Professional career ==
Muir originally was invited back to Scotland to sign for Livingston in the Scottish championship in 2007, however, the sale of the club prevented the deal moving forward and Muir featured for Stirling Albion in the Scottish First Division (championship) for the remainder of the 2007–08 season.

Signing for Irish Premiership side Lisburn Distillery in 2008 proved to be an important move in Muir's career after being offered deals from a variety of clubs in the Scottish first and second divisions. starting every game, scoring 13 goals, assisting on 15 occasions and was awarded 11 Man of the Match awards. He also scored his first senior football hat-trick at the club. Distillery finished fourth in the IPL, qualifying for the preliminary qualification rounds of the UEFA Europa League. A foot fracture sidelined him for four months. After recovering Muir returned to Scotland with Clyde in September 2009, however, this was only to be short term before heading back across the water to play at Ballymena United for the remainder or the 2009–10 season where they reached the Irish cup final.

In 2010 Muir signed for Airdrie United in the Scottish First Division and at the end of the season was approached and offered a deal to play in Central America at Antigua GFC. During another season of multiple goals and assists Muir scored a memorable second career hat-trick.

Muir signed for Vittoriosa Stars in Malta. Making a huge impact bringing the club from 11th position in the league table up to 5th – 11 undefeated games, scoring five goals and providing seven assists.

In the 2012–13 season, Muir played an influential role at Again winning promotion to the Premier Division, scoring nine goals and assisting on 15 occasions.

2013–14 saw Muir move to the most successful club in Maltese history, Floriana, after agreeing a deal. During the 2013–14 campaign he only missed one game during the entire season, he achieved 10 goals and 10 assists and was a significant performer during the club's AME Cup triumph. Muir was resigned under new head coach Giovanni Tedesco . Having spent two successful seasons as club captain scoring 12 times and assisting in 18 goals, Muir transferred to old firm rivals Sliema Wanderers.

Muir's move in season 2015–16 turned out to be a major success turning out for the stripes 35 times, the most appearances of any of the playing squad. He scored one goal and assisted in 11 from the fullback's positions. He won the prestigious FA trophy, the club's 21st time, qualifying for the UEFA Europa league qualifying rounds. Muir's achievements ended high as he was a nominee by the MFPA season 2015–16 for the league's best left full back award. Muirs performances and success on the pitch led to a transfer to Birkirkara where he signed for the club until the end of season 2018/19. Success through the years in the premier league seen him help clubs qualify for the UEFA Europe league on numerous occasions. Winning the Malta summer cup on two occasions and the prestigious Malta FA trophy. Muir was also part of the squad which played in the super cup final.

On 26 June 2018, it was announced that Muir had signed for Glenavon. He played in the club's most successful win against coach Ole Gunnar Solskjær and his Molde FK side in their UEFA Europa league home tie. After a small number of appearances Muir left the club by mutual consent in January 2019.
