= Paul Lovering =

Scottish footballer and manager

Personal information
- Full name: Paul Lovering
- Date of birth: 25 November 1975 (age 50)
- Place of birth: Glasgow, Scotland
- Position: Defender

Team information
- Current team: Benburb (manager)

Senior career*
Years	Team	Apps	(Gls)
1995–1998	Clydebank	69	(5)
1998–2000	Hibernian	31	(1)
2000–2003	Ayr United	81	(3)
2003–2004	St Johnstone	5	(0)
2004–2012	Airdrie United	222	(10)
2012–2013	Pollok	5	(0)
2013	Airdrieonians	0	(0)
2013–2014	Benburb	?	(?)

Managerial career
- 2013: Airdrieonians (assistant)
- 2015–: Benburb (manager)
- * Club domestic league appearances and goals as of 13 August 2018

Paul Lovering (born 25 November 1975 in Glasgow) is a Scottish former professional footballer and is currently the manager at Glasgow West of Scotland Football League club Benburb.

Throughout his career he played for five clubs in the Scottish Football League before joining the Juniors with Pollok in 2012.

== Career ==
Lovering, a left sided defender, began his career at Clydebank in 1995. In 1998, he was signed by Hibernian manager Alex McLeish for £100,000 and proceeded to make 31 appearances for the Edinburgh based club over two seasons. After being released by the club, he joined Ayr United in 2000, where he helped the club to the League Cup final in season 2001–02.

Lovering moved to St Johnstone in 2003, where he remained for just six months before moving to Airdrie United.

It was announced in July 2012 that Lovering had signed for Pollok, bringing to an end his eight-year stay with The Diamonds. Lovering's stint at Newlandsfield was plagued by injury, restricting him to only a handful of appearances.

In June 2013, Lovering returned to Airdrie as the assistant coach and a registered -player. However, he left Airdrie following the sacking in October 2013 of manager and close friend Jimmy Boyle.

He is currently manager at Glasgow Junior side Benburb, taking over the role in 2015 from his father Frank who then took up an executive position, having held the manager role for the previous 13 years.

== Honours ==
Airdrie United

- Scottish Challenge Cup: 2008–09

Benburb

- West of Scotland Football League Premier Division: Manager of the Year 2021–22
