= Ryan Donnelly (footballer) =

Scottish footballer (born 1991)

Personal information
- Date of birth: 23 October 1991 (age 35)
- Position: Forward

Youth career
- 2008–2010: Airdrie United

Senior career*
Years	Team	Apps	(Gls)
2010–2013	Airdrie United	82	(30)
2013–2014	Brechin City	14	(2)
2014	Albion Rovers	14	(3)
2014–2015	Ayr United	14	(2)
2015–2017	Hurlford United		
2017–2020	Gartcairn Juniors		
- * Club domestic league appearances and goals as of 15:01, 18 October 2017 (UTC)

Ryan Donnelly (born 23 October 1991) is a Scottish footballer, who last played for Gartcairn Juniors in the Scottish Junior Football Association, West Region. He first played for Airdrie United and has also played for Brechin City, Albion Rovers and Ayr United.

== Career ==
Donnelly began his career at Airdrie United initially in the youth team, then signing professionally for the 2010–11 season. His form at Airdrie began to attract interest from other clubs and he was linked with a move to Celtic although he said his preference would be a move to England. In March 2012, he spent a week training with Wigan Athletic whose Manager Roberto Martinez said he would continue to keep an eye on him.

In November 2011, Donnelly won the SFL Young Player of the Month award. At the end of the 2011–12 season he won the SFL Player of the Year award for the Second Division. and was named in the 2011–12 PFA Scotland Second Division Team of the Year. In May 2013, Donnelly left Airdrie by mutual consent.

On 21 June 2013, Donnelly signed for Brechin City. He was released by Brechin in January 2014.

Donnelly then signed for Albion Rovers. He left the club at the end of the 2013–14 season.

After leaving Albion Rovers, Donnelly spent time on trial with Dumbarton. On 24 July 2014, he signed for Ayr United,

Donnelly obtained for his release from Ayr and joined Hurlford United in April 2015. After a short spell out of the game, he joined his local club, Gartcairn Juniors in September 2017.
