= Scott Gemmill =

Scottish footballer

Personal information
- Date of birth: 9 June 1987 (age 39)
- Place of birth: Rutherglen, Scotland
- Position: Striker

Youth career
- 1998–2003: St Mirren

Senior career*
Years	Team	Apps	(Gls)
2003–2007	St Mirren	8	(0)
2007–2008	Berwick Rangers	27	(7)
2008–2009	Clyde	30	(2)
2009–2011	Airdrie United	54	(14)
- * Club domestic league appearances and goals as of 7 August 2011

Scott Gemmill (born 9 June 1987) is a Scottish former footballer who played as a forward.

== Career ==
Raised in East Kilbride, Gemmill was selected for the Lanarkshire Schools XI in 2002 alongside future Scotland international forward Steven Fletcher, while a pupil at Duncanrig Secondary School. He began his club career with St Mirren, where he made 10 appearances, all as a substitute, scoring no goals. His debut on 9 August 2003 against Raith Rovers at the age of 16 years 61 days made him St Mirren's youngest ever first team player, breaking a mark set by Ricky Gillies; this record still stands.

He was allowed to leave Saints in June 2007, and dropped down to the Scottish Second Division to join Berwick Rangers. He made 30 appearances for Berwick, scoring 8 goals, before leaving the club after one season in June 2008.

Gemmill joined Scottish First Division side Clyde in July 2008, signing a one-year contract. He made his debut a day later, in a 2–0 victory over Annan Athletic in the Scottish Challenge Cup. He scored his first goal for Clyde on 30 August 2008, in a 3–2 victory over St Johnstone. He was released by Clyde in June 2009 along with other out of contract players, due to the club's financial position.

Gemmill went on to join Airdrie United, quickly re-joining the club after being released following their relegation from the Scottish First Division in 2010 and playing regularly for two seasons (64 appearances, 18 goals), but left the Diamonds permanently at the end of 2010–11.

== Statistics ==
Correct as of 16 January 2009

Club Performance
Club	Season	League		Cup		League Cup		Other		Total
Club	Season	Apps	Goals	Apps	Goals	Apps	Goals	Apps	Goals	Apps	Goals
St Mirren	2003–04	3	0	0	0	1	0	2	0	6	0
St Mirren	2004–05	0	0	0	0	0	0	0	0	0	0
St Mirren	2005–06	0	0	0	0	0	0	0	0	0	0
St Mirren	2006–07	5	0	0	0	0	0	0	0	5	0
St Mirren	Total	8	0	0	0	1	0	2	0	11	0
Berwick Rangers	2007–08	27	7	0	0	2	1	1	0	30	8
Berwick Rangers	Total	27	7	0	0	2	1	1	0	30	8
Clyde	2008–09	16	1	0	0	2	0	3	0	21	1
Clyde	Total	16	1	0	0	2	0	3	0	21	1
Career Totals		51	8	0	0	5	1	6	0	62	9
