= 2010–11 Scottish Second Division =

Irn-Bru Scottish Second Division
- Season: 2010–11
- Champions: Livingston
- Promoted: Livingston, Ayr United (via Division 1 play-offs)
- Relegated: Alloa Athletic, Peterhead
- Biggest home win: East Fife 6–0 Dumbarton (28 August 2010); East Fife 6–0 Stenhousemuir (11 December 2010) Brechin City 6–0 Dumbarton (26 March 2011)
- Biggest away win: Peterhead 0–5 Brechin (11 December 2010) Airdrie Utd 0–5 Ayr Utd (5 March 2011)
- Highest scoring: Livingston 4–3 East Fife (29 January 2011) Ayr Utd 4–3 Stenhousemuir (29 January 2011)
- Highest attendance: 1,863: Livingston 2–1 Airdrie Utd (21 August 2010)
- Lowest attendance: 312: Peterhead 5–1 Airdrie Utd (14 December 2010)

The 2010–11 Scottish Second Division was the seventeenth season of the Second Division in its current format of ten teams.

== Promotion and relegation from 2009–10 ==
Location of teams in Scottish Second Division 2011–12

=== First & Second Divisions ===
Relegated from First Division to Second Division

- Ayr United
- Airdrie United (via play-offs)

Promoted from Second Division to First Division

- Stirling Albion
- Cowdenbeath(via play-offs)

=== Second & Third Divisions ===
Relegated from Second Division to Third Division

- Clyde
- Arbroath (via play-offs)

Promoted from Third Division to Second Division

- Livingston
- Forfar Athletic (via play-offs)

== League table ==
Pos	Team	Pld	W	D	L	GF	GA	GD	Pts	Promotion, qualification or relegation
1	Livingston (C, P)	36	25	7	4	79	33	+46	82	Promotion to the First Division
2	Ayr United (O, P)	36	18	5	13	62	55	+7	59	Qualification for the First Division play-offs
3	Forfar Athletic	36	17	8	11	50	48	+2	59	Qualification for the First Division play-offs
4	Brechin City	36	15	12	9	63	45	+18	57	Qualification for the First Division play-offs
5	East Fife	36	14	10	12	77	60	+17	52	
6	Airdrie United	36	13	9	14	52	60	−8	48	
7	Dumbarton	36	11	7	18	52	70	−18	40	
8	Stenhousemuir	36	10	8	18	46	59	−13	38	
9	Alloa Athletic (R)	36	9	9	18	49	71	−22	36	Qualification for the Second Division play-offs
10	Peterhead (R)	36	5	11	20	47	76	−29	26	Relegation to the Third Division

Source: SPFL
Rules for classification: 1) points; 2) goal difference; 3) number of goals scored.
(C) Champions; (O) Play-off winners; (P) Promoted; (R) Relegated

== Results ==
Teams play each other four times in this league. In the first half of the season each team plays every other team twice (home and away) and then do the same in the second half of the season, for a total of 36 games

=== First half of season ===
Home \ Away	AIR	ALO	AYR	BRE	DUM	EFI	FOR	LIV	PET	STE
Airdrie United		0–1	2–2	1–1	1–2	1–1	2–0	0–1	2–2	1–0
Alloa Athletic	2–3		4–1	2–2	0–0	3–2	3–2	2–2	2–2	1–0
Ayr United	1–0	2–1		0–2	1–0	0–4	0–1	3–1	1–1	2–0
Brechin City	3–1	3–1	0–3		3–3	2–3	0–0	1–3	4–2	0–0
Dumbarton	1–3	4–1	3–2	1–3		4–1	1–2	1–2	3–0	1–0
East Fife	3–3	4–1	2–3	1–3	6–0		1–3	2–4	2–1	6–0
Forfar Athletic	1–2	1–1	4–1	1–1	4–1	3–2		1–0	1–1	2–0
Livingston	2–1	3–3	3–2	2–0	2–0	1–1	2–0		1–0	4–1
Peterhead	5–1	1–0	2–4	0–5	1–0	2–2	1–2	0–0		2–2
Stenhousemuir	1–3	0–1	3–1	0–0	4–0	1–1	3–0	1–2	3–1	

Updated to match(es) played on 19 April 2011. Source: BBC Sport
Legend: Blue = home team win; Yellow = draw; Red = away team win.

=== Second half of season ===
Home \ Away	AIR	ALO	AYR	BRE	DUM	EFI	FOR	LIV	PET	STE
Airdrie United		0–2	0–5	2–2	2–1	2–2	3–1	2–4	1–0	2–2
Alloa Athletic	1–0		0–1	2–2	2–3	1–3	0–3	1–3	0–0	1–2
Ayr United	3–1	1–0		2–0	2–0	1–1	3–1	0–3	2–2	4–3
Brechin City	1–2	3–2	1–0		6–0	1–3	0–1	1–0	3–1	3–1
Dumbarton	1–1	2–2	1–2	1–2		4–2	0–0	0–3	5–2	0–1
East Fife	0–1	3–1	3–2	0–0	1–3		3–0	1–3	3–1	1–1
Forfar Athletic	1–2	3–1	3–2	2–1	2–1	0–0		0–4	2–1	1–1
Livingston	2–0	4–0	0–0	0–0	1–1	4–3	3–0		5–1	2–1
Peterhead	2–4	4–1	1–2	1–1	1–2	0–2	1–1	3–0		0–3
Stenhousemuir	1–0	2–3	2–1	1–3	2–2	0–2	0–1	0–3	4–2	

Updated to match(es) played on 7 May 2011. Source: ESPN soccernet
Legend: Blue = home team win; Yellow = draw; Red = away team win.

=== Top goalscorers ===
21 goals

- (Scotland) Mark Roberts (Ayr United)
- (Scotland) Iain Russell (Livingston)

18 goals

- (Scotland) Rory McAllister (Brechin City)

13 goals

- (Scotland) Bobby Linn (East Fife)
- (Scotland) Jon McShane (Dumbarton)

== Second Division play-offs ==
Times are BST (UTC+1)

=== Semi-finals ===
The fourth placed team in the Third Division will play the ninth placed team in the Second Division, and third placed team in the Third Division will play the second placed team in the Third Division. The play-offs will be played over two legs on Wednesday 11 May 2011 & Saturday 14 May 2011, the winning team in each semi-final will advance to the final televised live on BBC Alba on Sunday 22 May 2011.

Team 1	Agg.	Team 2	1st leg	2nd leg
Annan Athletic	2 – 1	Alloa Athletic	2–1	0–0
Queen's Park	1 – 3	Albion Rovers	1–1	0–2

First legs

11 May 2011
7:45pm

Annan Athletic	2 – 1	Alloa Athletic
Muirhead 14'; Steele 60'	BBC Sport	Scott 65'

Galabank
Attendance: 621
Referee: Craig Charleston

11 May 2011
7:45pm

Queen's Park	1 – 1	Albion Rovers
Smith 11'	BBC Sport	Chaplain 80'

Hampden Park
Attendance: 789
Referee: Brian Colvin

Second legs

14 May 2011
3:00pm

Alloa Athletic	0 – 0	Annan Athletic
	BBC Sport

Recreation Park, Alloa
Attendance: 622
Referee: George Salmond

14 May 2011
3:00pm

Albion Rovers	2 – 0	Queen's Park
Gemmell 67', 89'	BBC Sport

Cliftonhill
Attendance: 859
Referee: Stephen Finnie

=== Final ===
The two semi-final winners will play each other over two legs. The winning team will be awarded a place in the 2011–12 Second Division.

Team 1	Agg.	Team 2	1st leg	2nd leg
Albion Rovers	4 – 3	Annan Athletic	3–1	1–2

First leg

18 May 2011
7:45pm

Albion Rovers	3 – 1	Annan Athletic
Love 15', 67', 76'	BBC Sport	Harty 42'

Cliftonhill
Attendance: 1,014
Referee: Alan Muir

Second leg

22 May 2011
3:00pm

Annan Athletic	2 – 1	Albion Rovers
Gilfillan 51', 65'	BBC Sport	Donnelly 24'

Galabank
Attendance: 1,165
Referee: John McKendrick

== Stadia ==
Team	Stadium	Capacity	Seated
Ayr United	Somerset Park	10,243	1,597
Airdrie United	Excelsior Stadium	10,171	All
Livingston	Braidwood Motor Company Stadium	10,122	All
Forfar Athletic	Station Park	5,177	739
Peterhead	Balmoor	4,000	1,000
Brechin City	Glebe Park	3,960	1,519
Stenhousemuir	Ochilview Park	3,776	626
Alloa Athletic	Recreation Park	3,142	919
Dumbarton	Strathclyde Homes Stadium	2,025	All
East Fife	Bayview Stadium	1,992	All

== See also ==
- Scottish football referee strike
