= Jimmy Boyle (footballer) =

Scottish footballer and coach

Personal information
- Full name: James Thompson Boyle
- Date of birth: 19 February 1967 (age 59)
- Place of birth: Glasgow, Scotland
- Positions: Defender; midfielder

Team information
- Current team: Arbroath (assistant manager)

Youth career
- Celtic

Senior career*
Years	Team	Apps	(Gls)
1985–1989	Queens Park	147	(16)
1989–1997	Airdrieonians	242	(15)
1997–1998	Partick Thistle	36	(2)
1998–1999	Livingston	34	(1)
1999–2000	Alloa Athletic	16	(1)
2000–2002	Cowdenbeath	68	(1)
2002–2003	Airdrie United	9	(0)

Managerial career
- 2010–2013: Airdrieonians
- * Club domestic league appearances and goals

Jimmy Boyle (born 19 February 1967) is a Scottish football player and coach who is currently the assistant manager of Cove Rangers. He is best known for the eight years he spent with the original Airdrieonians, and the manager of new Airdrieonians from 2010 to 2013. He played in two Scottish Cup Finals in his time with the original Airdrieonians.

Having managed the Airdrie Under-19s at the club for several years, he succeeded Kenny Black as interim first team manager in July 2010, with the appointment being made permanent in September 2010. Boyle was sacked in October 2013, with the team bottom of the 2013–14 Scottish League One table.

Boyle moved into a role within the Scottish Football Association before being appointed Dundee F.C. Head of Youth Development in April 2016. He was appointed Dundee assistant manager in October 2018 under manager Jim McIntyre, but he was sacked on 12 May 2019 after the club had been relegated from the Premiership.

In June 2022, Boyle would return to football with McIntyre as his assistant manager with Scottish Championship side Cove Rangers.

== Manager statistics ==
As of 19 October 2013

Managerial record by team and tenure
Team	Nat	From	To	Record				
Team	Nat	From	To	G	W	D	L	Win %
Airdrieonians	(Scotland)	20 June 2010	21 October 2013	144	43	32	69	29.86
Career Total				144	43	32	69	29.86

== Honours ==
=== Player ===
Airdrieonians

- Scottish Challenge Cup 1994–95

Livingston

- Scottish Second Division 1998–99

Alloa Athletic

- Scottish Challenge Cup 1999–2000

Cowdenbeath

- Scottish Third Division promotion 2000–01

=== Manager ===
Airdrieonians

- Scottish Second Division promotion 2011–2012

== See also ==
- List of footballers in Scotland by number of league appearances (500+)
