= Scottish Football League Second Division =

- Founded: 1975
- Folded: 2013
- Country: Scotland
- Number of clubs: 10
- Level on pyramid: 3
- Promotion to: Scottish First Division
- Relegation to: Scottish Third Division
- Domestic cup(s): Scottish Cup; League Cup; Challenge Cup
- Last champions: Queen of the South (2012–13)

The Scottish Football League Second Division was the third tier of the Scottish football league system between 1975 and 2013.

== History ==
The Second Division was created in 1975, as part of a wider reconstruction of the Scottish Football League (SFL). Prior to 1975, the SFL had been split into two divisions (Division One and Division Two). The effect of the reconstruction was to split these two divisions into three, with the top flight named the Premier Division, second tier the First Division, and a new third tier was created known as the Second Division. A fourth tier, known as the Third Division, was created in 1994.

In 1998, the Premier Division clubs broke away from the SFL to form the Scottish Premier League (SPL). The Second Division continued as before, but it was now the second level of the SFL. In 2013, the SFL and SPL merged to form the Scottish Professional Football League (SPFL). The SPFL named its third tier as Scottish League One, which effectively replaced the Second Division.

== Competition ==
From 1994 until 2013, the Second Division consisted of ten teams. From 1994 to 2006, the top two teams were promoted to the First Division and the bottom two were relegated to the Third Division. From 2006 to 2013, the top team in the Second Division was promoted to the First Division, while the clubs in 2nd through 4th places entered an end of season play-off with the 9th placed side in the First Division. The bottom club was automatically relegated to the Third Division and the 9th placed club entered an end of season play-off with the second, third and fourth placed clubs from the Third Division.

The teams played each other four times with three points for a victory and one point each for a drawn game. In the event of two teams finishing with the same number of points, the respective teams' position is decided on goal difference. If goal difference is equal too, the team who has scored the most goals is placed higher.

Most players in the Second Division were part-time professionals.

== Winners of the Second Division ==
Season	Winner	Runner-up
1998–99	Livingston	Inverness Caledonian Thistle
1999–00	Clyde	Alloa Athletic
2000–01	Partick Thistle	Arbroath
2001–02	Queen of the South	Alloa Athletic
2002–03	Raith Rovers	Brechin City
2003–04	Airdrie United	Hamilton Academical
2004–05	Brechin City	Stranraer
2005–06	Gretna	Greenock Morton^{[b]}
2006–07	Greenock Morton	Stirling Albion
2007–08	Ross County	Airdrie United^{[note 1]}
2008–09	Raith Rovers (2)	Ayr United
2009–10	Stirling Albion	Alloa Athletic^{[b]}
2010–11	Livingston (2)	Ayr United
2011–12	Cowdenbeath	Arbroath^{[b]}
2012–13	Queen of the South (2)	Alloa Athletic

b. Team failed to gain promotion via play-offs

== Notes ==
- 1. Airdrie United lost in the play-offs, but were promoted due to Gretna's demotion to the Third Division, and subsequent resignation from the Scottish Football League.
