= 2011–12 Brechin City F.C. season =

Brechin City
2011–12 season
- Chairman: Ken Ferguson
- Manager: Jim Weir
- Stadium: Glebe Park
- Scottish Second Division: Eighth place
- Challenge Cup: Round one
- League Cup: Round one
- Scottish Cup: Round four
- Top goalscorer: League: Paul McManus (14); All: Paul McManus (16)
- Highest home attendance: 911 vs. Arbroath, 24 September 2011
- Lowest home attendance: 347 vs. Stenhousemuir, 21 February 2012

The 2011–12 season was Brechin City's sixth consecutive season in the Scottish Second Division, having been relegated from the Scottish First Division at the end of the 2005–06 season. Brechin also competed in the Challenge Cup, League Cup and the Scottish Cup.

== Summary ==
Brechin finished eighth in the Second Division. They reached the first round of the Challenge Cup, the first round of the League Cup and the fourth round of the Scottish Cup.

== Results & fixtures ==
Win Draw Loss Postponed

=== Second Division ===
6 August 2011	Brechin City	2–0	Stenhousemuir	Glebe Park
15:00	David McKenna 71'; McManus 80'	BBC Report		Attendance: 442; Referee: Craig Charleston

13 August 2011	Cowdenbeath	3–1	Brechin City	Central Park
	Ramsay 13'; McKenzie 67'; Morton 80'	BBC Report	Brady 37'	Attendance: 308; Referee: Beaton

20 August 2011	Brechin City	3–3	Dumbarton	Glebe Park
	Fusco 46'; McManus 52' (pen.); McKenna 56'	BBC Report	Agnew 11', 89'; Lyden 28'; Lithgow (red card) 51'	Attendance: 427; Referee: Roache

27 August 2011	Albion Rovers	1–2	Brechin City	Cliftonhill
	Fahey (red card) 28'	BBC Report	McManus 30' (pen.); Dunlop 90'	Attendance: 386; Referee: Colvin

10 September 2011	Brechin City	0–1	Forfar Athletic	Glebe Park
15:00	Carcary (red card) 85'	BBC Report	Templeman 61'	Attendance: 651; Referee: Northcroft

17 September 2011	East Fife	1–1	Brechin City	Bayview Stadium
	Wallace 8'	BBC Report	Lister 57'	Attendance: 501; Referee: McKendrick

24 September 2011	Brechin City	2–3	Arbroath	Glebe Park
	Buist 29'; McManus 82' (pen.)	BBC Report	Sibanda 36'; Doris 78' (pen.); Swankie 88'	Attendance: 911; Referee: Hilland

1 October 2011	Stirling Albion	1–0	Brechin City	Doubletree Dunblane Stadium
	Smith 19'	BBC Report	Lister (red card) 29'	Attendance: 555; Referee: Winter

15 October 2011	Brechin City	1–1	Airdrie United	Glebe Park
15:00	King 51' (pen.)	SFL Report	Donnelly 14'	Attendance: 455; Referee: Clancy

22 October 2011	Stenhousemuir	1–1	Brechin City	Ochilview Park, Stenhousemuir
15:00	Dickson 40'	BBC Report	King 29' (pen.); Hodge (red card) 35'	Attendance: 681; Referee: Colvin

29 October 2011	Brechin City	1–0	Cowdenbeath	Glebe Park
15:00	King 53'	BBC Report		Attendance: 418; Referee: Colvin

5 November 2011	Forfar Athletic	0–0	Brechin City	Station Park
		SFL Report		Attendance: 661; Referee: McKendrick

12 November 2011	Brechin City	1–4	Albion Rovers	Glebe Park
	Lister 81'	BBC Report	O'Byrne 17'; McStay 21'; Love 66'; Chaplain 90' (pen.)	Attendance: 455; Referee: Salmond

26 November 2011	Brechin City	0–2	East Fife	Glebe Park
15:00		SFL Report	Linn 1'; Ogleby 22'	Attendance: 508; Referee: Charleston

3 December 2011	Arbroath	1–1	Brechin City	Gayfield Park, Arbroath
15:00	Falkingham 63'	SFL Report	McManus 90'	Attendance: 1,104; Referee: Hilland

10 December 2011	Brechin City	P–P	Stirling Albion	Glebe Park
15:00

17 December 2011	Airdrie United	2–3	Brechin City	Excelsior Stadium
15:00	Devlin (red card) 51'; Donnelly 69', 83'	SFL Report	Lister 34'; McManus 79'; McKenna 82'	Attendance: 643; Referee: Clancy

26 December 2011	Albion Rovers	0–1	Brechin City	Cliftonhill
14:00		SFL Report	McManus 38'	Attendance: 414; Referee: Tumilty

2 January 2012	Brechin City	2–1	Forfar Athletic	Glebe Park
15:00	McManus 51', 59'	SFL Report	Templeman 39'	Attendance: 776; Referee: McDermott

14 January 2012	Dumbarton	1–0	Brechin City	Strathclyde Homes Stadium
13:30	Prunty 89'	SFL Report		Attendance: 572; Referee: Conroy

21 January 2012	Brechin City	P–P	Stenhousemuir	Glebe Park
15:00

28 January 2012	Brechin City	P–P	Arbroath	Glebe Park
15:00

4 February 2012	East Fife	P–P	Brechin City	Bayview Stadium
15:00

11 February 2012	Brechin City	1–1	Airdrie United	Glebe Park
15:00	McManus 26'; Molloy (yellow card) 79' (red card)	SFL Report	Holmes 72'	Attendance: 483; Referee: Roache

14 February 2012	Brechin City	1–1	Arbroath	Glebe Park
15:00	McLean 81'	SFL Report	Doris 71'	Attendance: 703; Referee: Beaton

18 February 2012	Stirling Albion	2–3	Brechin City	Doubletree Dunblane Stadium
15:00	Ferry 33'; McLean 75' (Own goal)	SFL Report	Ferry 53' (Own goal); Hodge 83'; McKenzie 87'	Attendance: 479; Referee: Collum

21 February 2012	Brechin City	1–0	Stenhousemuir	Glebe Park
19:45	McKenzie 70'	SFL Report		Attendance: 347; Referee: Salmond

25 February 2012	Cowdenbeath	1–0	Brechin City	Central Park, Cowdenbeath
15:00	Lyle 90'	SFL Report		Attendance: 332; Referee: Richmond

28 February 2012	Brechin City	1–3	Stirling Albion	Glebe Park
19:45	McManus 63'	SFL Report	Cook 42'; Ferry 44'; Thom 62'	Attendance: 362; Referee: O'Reilly

3 March 2012	Brechin City	2–2	Dumbarton	Glebe Park
15:00	McManus 30'; McKenzie 34'	SFL Report	Prunty 57' (pen.); Agnew 73'	Attendance: 459; Referee: Robertson

6 March 2012	East Fife	2–2	Brechin City	Bayview Stadium
19:45	Sloan 25' (pen.), 45'	SFL Report	McManus 21'; McKenna 34'	Attendance: 416; Referee: Somers

10 March 2012	Forfar Athletic	4–1	Brechin City	Station Park
15:00	Fotheringham 20', 67' (pen.); Low 32'; Byers 43'	SFL Report; Report	Buist 45'	Attendance: 584; Referee: Colvin

17 March 2012	Brechin City	2–1	Albion Rovers	Glebe Park
15:00	McKenzie 54' (pen.); King 90'	SFL Report	Love 68'	Attendance: 421; Referee: Northcroft

24 March 2012	Brechin City	1–3	East Fife	Glebe Park
15:00	Moyes 16'	SFL Report	Wallace 31', 51', 90'	Attendance: 525; Referee: Madden

31 March 2012	Arbroath	2–3	Brechin City	Gayfield Park, Arbroath
15:00	Doris 21' (pen.); Gibson (red card) 85'	SFL Report	McKenzie 6'; McManus 14', 65'	Attendance: 917; Referee: Somers

7 April 2012	Brechin City	1–2	Stirling Albion	Glebe Park
15:00	Buist 86'	SFL Report	Ferry 33'; Cook 82'	Attendance: 468; Referee: Hilland

14 April 2012	Airdrie United	4–1	Brechin City	Excelsior Stadium
15:00	Holmes 7', 86'; Donnelly 14'; Lovering 23' (pen.)	SFL Report	Hodge 31'	Attendance: 802; Referee: McLean

21 April 2012	Stenhousemuir	2–1	Brechin City	Ochilview Park
15:00	Thomson 17'; Anderson 60'	SFL Report	Lister 82'	Attendance: 541; Referee: Roache

28 April 2012	Brechin City	2–2	Cowdenbeath	Glebe Park
15:00	McKenzie 22' (pen.), 25'	SFL Report	McKenzie 30'; Armstrong 54'	Attendance: 487; Referee: Cook

5 May 2012	Dumbarton	4–2	Brechin City	Strathclyde Homes Stadium
15:00	Dargo 59', 62', 72'; Thomson 90'	SFL Report	King 53'; Molloy 88'	Attendance: 636; Referee: Winter

=== Scottish Cup ===
19 November 2011 Third round	Brechin City	3–0	Dumbarton	Glebe Park
15:00	Molloy 26'; King 77'; McManus 93'	BBC Report		Attendance: 447; Referee: Beaton

7 January 2012 Fourth round	St Johnstone	2–1	Brechin City	McDiarmid Park
15:00	Davidson 6'; Sandaza 46'	BBC Report	McManus 26'; McLauchlan (yellow card) 90' (red card)	Attendance: 2,467; Referee: Tumilty

=== Challenge Cup ===
23 July 2011 First round	Brechin City	1–2	Falkirk	Glebe Park
	McKenna 40'	BBC Report	Bennett 26'; Dods 33'	Attendance: 596; Referee: Salmond

=== League Cup ===
30 July 2011 First round	Brechin City	2–4 (a.e.t.)	Clyde	Glebe Park
	McKenna 26'; Buist (red card) 97'; King 114'	BBC Report	McLauchlan 20' (o.g.); Sweeney 97' (pen.); Archdeacon 105'; Gray 119'	Attendance: 402; Referee: Northcroft

== Player statistics ==
=== Squad ===
Last updated 5 May 2012

No.	Pos	Nat	Player	Total		Second Division		Scottish Cup		League Cup		Challenge Cup	
No.	Pos	Nat	Player	Apps	Goals	Apps	Goals	Apps	Goals	Apps	Goals	Apps	Goals
	GK	(Scotland) SCO	Craig Nelson	37	0	34	0	2	0	1	0	0	0
	GK	(Scotland) SCO	David Scott	3	0	2	0	0	0	0	0	1	0
	DF	(Scotland) SCO	Scott Buist	34	3	31	3	1	0	1	0	1	0
	DF	(Scotland) SCO	Mick Dunlop	36	1	32	1	2	0	1	0	1	0
	DF	(Scotland) SCO	David McClune	15	0	12	0	1	0	1	0	1	0
	DF	(Scotland) SCO	Gerry McLauchlan	12	0	9	0	1	0	1	0	1	0
	DF	(Scotland) SCO	Paul McLean	33	1	30	1	2	0	0	0	1	0
	DF	(Scotland) SCO	Scott Smith	12	0	12	0	0	0	0	0	0	0
	DF	(Scotland) SCO	Ewan Moyes	15	1	15	1	0	0	0	0	0	0
	DF	(Scotland) SCO	Jonathan Lindsay	9	0	9	0	0	0	0	0	0	0
	DF	(Scotland) SCO	Scott Webster	1	0	1	0	0	0	0	0	0	0
	MF	(Scotland) SCO	Garry Brady	32	1	28	1	2	0	1	0	1	0
	MF	(Scotland) SCO	Gary Fusco	31	1	29	1	1	0	0	0	1	0
	MF	(Scotland) SCO	Neil Janczyk	13	0	12	0	0	0	1	0	0	0
	MF	(Scotland) SCO	Craig Molloy	34	2	31	1	2	1	1	0	0	0
	MF	(Scotland) SCO	Bryan Hodge	27	2	25	2	2	0	0	0	0	0
	MF	(Scotland) SCO	David Crawford	21	0	20	0	1	0	0	0	0	0
	MF	(Scotland) SCO	Matthew Adam	1	0	1	0	0	0	0	0	0	0
	FW	(Scotland) SCO	Derek Carcary	15	0	11	0	2	0	1	0	1	0
	FW	(Scotland) SCO	Charlie King	28	6	24	5	2	1	1	0	1	0
	FW	(Scotland) SCO	Jim Lister	30	4	26	4	2	0	1	0	1	0
	FW	(Scotland) SCO	David McKenna	38	5	34	4	2	0	1	0	1	1
	FW	(Scotland) SCO	Michael Potter	0	0	0	0	0	0	0	0	0	0
	FW	(Scotland) SCO	Graham Weir	15	0	12	0	1	0	1	0	1	0
	FW	(Scotland) SCO	Paul McManus	34	16	30	14	2	2	1	0	1	0
	FW	(Scotland) SCO	Rory McKenzie	17	7	17	7	0	0	0	0	0	0

=== Disciplinary record ===
Includes all competitive matches.

Last updated 5 May 2012

Nation	Position	Name	Second Division		Scottish Cup		League Cup		Challenge Cup		Total	
Nation	Position	Name	Booked	Sent off (straight red)	Booked	Sent off (straight red)	Booked	Sent off (straight red)	Booked	Sent off (straight red)	Booked	Sent off (straight red)
(Scotland)	GK	Craig Nelson	0	0	0	0	0	0	0	0	0	0
(Scotland)	GK	David Scott	0	0	0	0	0	0	0	0	0	0
(Scotland)	DF	Scott Buist	7	0	0	0	0	1	0	0	7	1
(Scotland)	DF	Mick Dunlop	7	0	0	0	0	0	0	0	7	0
(Scotland)	DF	David McClune	0	0	1	0	0	0	0	0	1	0
(Scotland)	DF	Gerry McLauchlan	4	0	1	1	1	0	1	0	7	1
(Scotland)	DF	Paul McLean	3	0	1	0	0	0	0	0	4	0
(Scotland)	DF	Scott Smith	1	0	0	0	0	0	0	0	1	0
(Scotland)	DF	Ewan Moyes	3	0	0	0	0	0	0	0	3	0
(Scotland)	DF	Jonathan Lindsay	1	0	0	0	0	0	0	0	1	0
(Scotland)	MF	Garry Brady	1	0	0	0	0	0	0	0	1	0
(Scotland)	MF	Gary Fusco	3	0	0	0	0	0	0	0	3	0
(Scotland)	MF	Neil Janczyk	0	0	0	0	0	0	0	0	0	0
(Scotland)	MF	Craig Molloy	5	1	1	0	0	0	0	0	6	1
(Scotland)	MF	Bryan Hodge	2	1	0	0	0	0	0	0	2	1
(Scotland)	MF	David Crawford	0	0	0	0	0	0	0	0	0	0
(Scotland)	MF	Matthew Adam	0	0	0	0	0	0	0	0	0	0
(Scotland)	FW	Derek Carcary	0	1	0	0	0	0	1	0	1	1
(Scotland)	FW	Charlie King	1	0	0	0	0	0	0	0	1	0
(Scotland)	FW	Jim Lister	1	1	0	0	0	0	0	0	1	1
(Scotland)	FW	David McKenna	1	0	1	0	0	0	0	0	2	0
(Scotland)	FW	Michael Potter	0	0	0	0	0	0	0	0	0	0
(Scotland)	FW	Graham Weir	1	0	0	0	1	0	0	0	2	0
(Scotland)	FW	Paul McManus	4	0	1	0	0	0	0	0	5	0
(Scotland)	FW	Rory McKenzie	2	0	0	0	0	0	0	0	2	0

=== Awards ===
Last updated 30 January 2012

Nation	Name	Award	Month
(Scotland)	Jim Weir	Second Division Manager of the Month	December

== Team statistics ==
=== League table ===
Pos	Team	Pld	W	D	L	GF	GA	GD	Pts	Promotion, qualification or relegation
6	East Fife	36	14	6	16	55	57	−2	48	
7	Forfar Athletic	36	11	9	16	59	72	−13	42	
8	Brechin City	36	10	11	15	47	62	−15	41	
9	Albion Rovers (O)	36	10	7	19	43	66	−23	37	Qualification for Second Division play-offs
10	Stirling Albion (R)	36	9	7	20	46	70	−24	34	Relegation to the Third Division

Source: SPFL Archive
Rules for classification: 1) points; 2) goal difference; 3) number of goals scored.
(O) Play-off winners; (R) Relegated

== Transfers ==
=== Players in ===
Player	From	Fee
(Scotland) Garry Brady	(Scotland) St Mirren	Free
(Scotland) Paul McManus	(Malta) Hibernians	Free
(Scotland) Scott Buist	(Scotland) Stirling Albion	Free
(Scotland) David McClune	(Scotland) Alloa Athletic	Free
(Scotland) Mick Dunlop	(Scotland) Alloa Athletic	Free
(Scotland) Derek Carcary	(Scotland) Dumbarton	Free
(Scotland) David Crawford	(Scotland) Hibernian	Loan
(Scotland) Scott Smith	(Scotland) Hibernian	Loan
(Scotland) Jim Lister	(Scotland) Alloa Athletic	Free
(Scotland) Graham Weir	(Scotland) Raith Rovers	Free
(Scotland) Bryan Hodge	(Scotland) Partick Thistle	Free
(Scotland) Ewan Moyes	(England) Gateshead	Free
(Scotland) David Crawford	(Scotland) Hibernian	Free
(Scotland) Rory McKenzie	(Scotland) Kilmarnock	Loan
(Scotland) Jonathan Lindsay	(Scotland) Partick Thistle	Loan

=== Players out ===
Player	To	Fee
(Scotland) Andrew Cook	(Scotland) East Fife	Free
(Scotland) Jamie Redman	(Scotland) Peterhead	Free
(Scotland) David White	(Scotland) East Fife	Free
(Scotland) Kevin Byers	(Scotland) Forfar Athletic	Free
(Scotland) Mark Archdeacon	(Scotland) Clyde	Free
(Scotland) Mark Docherty	(Scotland) Alloa Athletic	Free
(Scotland) Rory McAllister	(Scotland) Peterhead	Free
(Scotland) Scott Morrison	(Scotland) Pollok	Free
(Scotland) Neil Janczyk	(Scotland) East Fife	Free
(Scotland) Graham Weir	(Scotland) Stirling Albion	Free
