= 2012–13 Brechin City F.C. season =

Brechin City
2012–13 season
- Chairman: Ken Ferguson
- Manager: Jim Weir (Until 29 September 2012); Ray McKinnon (From 9 October 2012)
- Stadium: Glebe Park; Station Park
- Second Division: Third place
- Challenge Cup: First round, lost to Rangers
- League Cup: First round, lost to Stenhousemuir
- Scottish Cup: Fourth round, lost to St Mirren
- Top goalscorer: League: Alan Trouten (17); All: Andy Jackson (20); Alan Trouten (20)
- Highest home attendance: 4,123 vs Rangers; Challenge Cup; 29 July 2012
- Lowest home attendance: 401 vs Stranraer; Second Division; 23 April 2013

The 2012–13 season was Brechin City's seventh consecutive season in the Scottish Second Division, having been relegated from the Scottish First Division at the end of the 2005–06 season. Brechin also competed in the Challenge Cup, League Cup and the Scottish Cup.

== Summary ==
=== Season ===
Brechin finished third in the Scottish Second Division, entering the play-offs losing 4–3 to Alloa Athletic on aggregate in the Semi-final and remained in the Scottish Second Division. They reached the first round of the Challenge Cup, the first round of the League Cup and the fourth round of the Scottish Cup.

=== Management ===
They began the season under the management of Jim Weir. On 29 September 2012, Weir was sacked by the club following poor results. Andy Millen and Kevin McGowne took over in caretaker capacities on 30 September 2012 following Weir's departure. The pair were in charge for the match against Arbroath the following week. On 9 October 2012, Ray McKinnon was appointed as the new manager, taking over with Brechin third from bottom.

=== Stadium ===
Due to drainage problems at Glebe Park causing a string of postponements and with available dates to play the postponed fixtures running out Brechin took the decision to play two home ties at Station Park. This was done in an effort to avoid further postponements.

== Results & fixtures ==
Win Draw Loss Postponed

=== Preseason ===
14 July 2012 Friendly	Montrose	0–5	Brechin City	Links Park
15:00		Report	Dalziel 15', 33', 55'; McLean 75'; Jackson 87'

24 July 2012 Friendly	Brechin City	2–1	Inverness Caledonian Thistle	Glebe Park
19:30	McKenna 62' (pen.), 89'	Report	Shinnie 42'

=== Scottish Second Division ===
11 August 2012	Brechin City	1–0	Albion Rovers	Glebe Park
15:00	Andrew Jackson 16'	SFL Report		Attendance: 413; Referee: Muir

18 August 2012	Stenhousemuir	3–1	Brechin City	Ochilview Park
15:00	Gemmell 21', 73', 90'	SFL Report	Jackson 58'	Attendance: 522; Referee: Anderson

25 August 2012	Brechin City	2–1	East Fife	Glebe Park
15:00	Jackson 11', 13'	SFL Report	Wardlaw 78'	Attendance: 588; Referee: Robertson

1 September 2012	Brechin City	1–3	Alloa Athletic	Glebe Park
15:00	Jackson 51'	SFL Report	Thomson 65'; Cawley 74'; Grehan 88'	Attendance: 491; Referee: Northcroft

15 September 2012	Forfar Athletic	1–0	Brechin City	Station Park
15:00	Fotheringham 22'	SFL Report		Attendance: 708; Referee: McDermott

22 September 2012	Brechin City	0–3	Queen of the South	Glebe Park
15:00		SFL Report	Higgins 7'; Lyle 40'; Gibson 53' (pen.)	Attendance: 538; Referee: Robertson

29 September 2012	Ayr United	3–0	Brechin City	Somerset Park
15:00	McCann (red card) 15'; Moffat 26'; Twaddle 53'; Sinclair 68'	SFL Report		Attendance: 993; Referee: Robertson

6 October 2012	Arbroath	3–1	Brechin City	Gayfield Park
15:00	Keddie 24'; Currie 75'; Holmes 86'	SFL Report	McKenna 51'	Attendance: 854; Referee: Hilland

20 October 2012	Brechin City	3–0	Stranraer	Glebe Park
15:00	Jackson 27', 31'; McKenna 65'	SFL Report		Attendance: 485; Referee: Graham

27 October 2012	Brechin City	7–2	Stenhousemuir	Glebe Park
15:00	Byrne 9'; Trouten 31', 42', 63'; McKenna 69' (pen.); Carcary 82', 84'	SFL Report	Gemmell 29'; Dickson 55'; Ferguson (red card) 68'	Attendance: 542; Referee: McLean

17 November 2012	Alloa Athletic	2–2	Brechin City	Recreation Park
15:00	Cawley 43'; Grehan 62'	SFL Report	Brown 69'; Jackson 83'	Attendance: 501; Referee: Robertson

20 November 2012	Albion Rovers	1–2	Brechin City	Cliftonhill
19:30	Phillips 30'	SFL Report	Jackson 46'; Carcary 72'	Attendance: 220; Referee: Anderson

24 November 2012	Brechin City	4–1	Forfar Athletic	Glebe Park
15:00	Brown 15'; Byrne 52' (pen.); Jackson 61', 90'	SFL Report	McCulloch (red card) 50'; Campbell 69'	Attendance: 702; Referee: Robertson

8 December 2012	Brechin City	P–P	Ayr United	Glebe Park
15:00		BBC Report

15 December 2012	Queen of the South	1–0	Brechin City	Palmerston Park
15:00	Carmichael 21'	BBC Sport		Attendance: 1,419; Referee: Salmond

22 December 2012	Brechin City	P–P	Ayr United	Glebe Park
15:00		BBC Report

26 December 2012	Brechin City	3–2	Arbroath	Glebe Park
15:00	Malcolm 8' (o.g.); McLean 35'; Trouten 61'	SFL Report	Sheerin 57'; Doris 64' (pen.)	Attendance: 978; Referee: Hilland

29 December 2012	Stranraer	0–2	Brechin City	Stair Park
15:00		SFL Report	Trouten 12' (pen.); Carcary 62'	Attendance: 326; Referee: Roache

2 January 2013	Forfar Athletic	1–4	Brechin City	Station Park
15:00	Swankie 80'	SFL Report	McKenna 46'; Brown 58'; Carcary 64'; Dalziel 81'	Attendance: 903; Referee: Tumilty

5 January 2013	Brechin City	3–2	Alloa Athletic	Glebe Park
15:00	McKenna 4'; Trouten 50'; Jackson 83'	SFL Report	Cawley 17'; McCord 38' (pen.)	Attendance: 602; Referee: Anderson

12 January 2013	East Fife	2–2	Brechin City	Bayview Stadium
15:00	Samuel 28'; Barr 37'	SFL Report	Trouten 6'; Carcary 30'	Attendance: 578; Referee: Clancy

19 January 2013	Brechin City	P–P	Albion Rovers	Glebe Park
15:00		BBC Report
Note: Postponed due to frozen pitch

26 January 2013	Brechin City	P–P	Queen of the South	Glebe Park
15:00		STV Report
Note: Postponed due to frozen pitch

2 February 2013	Ayr United	P–P	Brechin City	Somerset Park
15:00		BBC Report
Note: Postponed due to frozen pitch

9 February 2013	Brechin City	P–P	Stranraer	Glebe Park
15:00		BBC Report
Note: Postponed due to a waterlogged pitch

16 February 2013	Arbroath	0–1	Brechin City	Gayfield Park
15:00		SFL Report; Brechin Report	Trouten 87'	Attendance: 904; Referee: Finnie

19 February 2013	Brechin City	2–1	Ayr United	Glebe Park
19:45	McLauchlan 40', 59'	SFL Report	Moyes 56' (o.g.)	Attendance: 412; Referee: Graham

23 February 2013	Brechin City	P–P	East Fife	Glebe Park
15:00		BBC Report
Note: Postponed due to a waterlogged pitch

26 February 2013	Brechin City	P–P	Queen of the South	Glebe Park
19:45		BBC Report
Note: Postponed due to a waterlogged pitch

2 March 2013	Stenhousemuir	3–3	Brechin City	Ochilview Park
15:00	Corcoran 20'; Hay 55' (o.g.); Gemmell 63'; Gemmell (red card) 90'	SFL Report	Trouten 6'; Moyes 70'; McKenna 77'; Fusco (yellow card) 82' (yellow-red card)	Attendance: 504; Referee: Somers

5 March 2013	Ayr United	1–2	Brechin City	Somerset Park
19:45	Buchanan 50'	SFL Report	Moyes 25'; Hay 75'	Attendance: 631; Referee: Roache

9 March 2013	Brechin City	P–P	Forfar Athletic	Glebe Park
15:00		BBC Report
Note: Postponed due to a waterlogged pitch

12 March 2013	Brechin City	P–P	Albion Rovers	Glebe Park
19:45		BBC Report
Note: Postponed due to a frozen pitch

16 March 2013	Alloa Athletic	0–1	Brechin City	Recreation Park
15:00		SFL Report	Trouten 53'	Attendance: 382; Referee: Anderson

19 March 2013	Brechin City	P–P	Stranraer	Glebe Park
19:45		BBC Report
Note: Postponed due to a waterlogged pitch

23 March 2013	Brechin City	2–1	Ayr United	Station Park
15:00	Carcary 15'; Trouten 19'	SFL Report	Buchanan 61'; McGregor (yellow card) 75' (yellow-red card)	Attendance: 427; Referee: Northcroft

27 March 2013	Brechin City	0–6	Queen of the South	Station Park
19:45	McLauchlan (yellow card) 41' (yellow-red card) 76'	QOSFC Report	Clark 1', 42'; Paton 3', 36'; Moyes 18' (o.g.); Reilly 57'	Attendance: 627; Referee: Cook

30 March 2013	Queen of the South	2–1	Brechin City	Palmerston Park
15:00	Durnan 16'; Lyle 73'	QOSFC Report	Trouten 75' (pen.)	Attendance: 2,026; Referee: Aitken

2 April 2013	Brechin City	6–0	East Fife	Glebe Park
19:45	Carcary 8', 36'; Jackson 15', 46'; McLean 19'; Ferguson 70'	SFL Report		Attendance: 471; Referee: Graham

6 April 2013	Stranraer	3–2	Brechin City	Stair Park
15:00	Malcolm 28' (pen.), 71'; Aitken 76'	SFL Report	Carcary 35'; McLean 39'	Attendance: 299; Referee: McKendrick

9 April 2013	Brechin City	3–4	Forfar Athletic	Glebe Park
19:45	Hay 57'; Trouten 76', 87'	SFL Report	Hilson 12'; Bolochoweckyj 33'; Malin 46'; Swankie 84'	Attendance: 581; Referee: Roache

13 April 2013	Brechin City	2–0	Arbroath	Glebe Park
15:00	Jackson 64'; McLauchlan 86'	SFL Report		Attendance: 747; Referee: Robertson

20 April 2013	Albion Rovers	3–1	Brechin City	Cliftonhill Stadium
15:00	Green 28'; Dallas 65'; Crawford 90+5'	SFL Report	Trouten 84' (pen.); Andrews (red card) 90+4'	Attendance: 378; Referee: Robertson

23 April 2013	Brechin City	2–2	Stranraer	Glebe Park
19:45	Jackson 57'; Trouten 83'	SFL Report	One 44'; Malcolm 86'	Attendance: 401; Referee: Finnie

27 April 2013	Brechin City	1–2	Stenhousemuir	Glebe Park
15:00	Trouten 75'	SFL Report	Rowson 8'; Reid 34'	Attendance: 474; Referee: Hilland

30 April 2013	Brechin City	2–0	Albion Rovers	Glebe Park
	Carcary 19', 69'	SFL Report		Attendance: 402; Referee: Allan

4 May 2013	East Fife	0–3	Brechin City	Bayview Stadium
15:00		SFL Report	McKenna 70'; Brown 80', 85'	Attendance: 753; Referee: Dallas

=== First Division play-offs ===
8 May 2013 Semi-final, first leg	Brechin City	0–2	Alloa Athletic	Glebe Park
19:45		SFL Report	McCord 40'; Moon 56'	Attendance: 582; Referee: Madden

11 May 2013 Semi-final, second leg	Alloa Athletic	2–3 (4–3 agg.)	Brechin City	Recreation Park
15:00	Cawley 36'; Elliot 68' (pen.)	SFL Report	Jackson 4', 90+4'; Trouten 52' (pen.)	Attendance: 856; Referee: Collum

=== Scottish Challenge Cup ===
29 July 2012 First round	Brechin City	1–2 (a.e.t.)	Rangers	Glebe Park
15:05	Jackson 43'	BBC Report	Little 4'; McCulloch 102'	Attendance: 4,123; Referee: Salmond

=== Scottish League Cup ===
4 August 2012 First round	Stenhousemuir	4–0	Brechin City	Ochilview Park
15:00	Gemmell 1'; Smith 76', 90'; Kean 88' (pen.)	SFL Report	McLauchlan (red card) 87'	Attendance: 282; Referee: Somers

=== Scottish Cup ===
3 November 2012 Third round	Brechin City	2–2	Bonnyrigg Rose Athletic	Glebe Park
15:00	Jackson 61'; Dunn 78' (o.g.)	BBC Report	Grady 21'; Renton 58'	Attendance: 602; Referee: Dallas

10 November 2012 Third round replay	Bonnyrigg Rose Athletic	0–6	Brechin City	New Dundas Park
13:30	McKenna (red card) 75'	BBC Report	Byrne 11', 53'; Brown 16'; Trouten 19', 33'; Carcary 71'	Attendance: 1,082; Referee: Dallas

1 December 2012 Fourth round	St Mirren	2–0	Brechin City	St Mirren Park
15:00	McLean 32'; Robertson 42'	BBC Report		Attendance: 2,363; Referee: McKendrick

== Player statistics ==
=== Squad ===
Last updated 11 May 2013

No.	Pos	Nat	Player	Total		Second Division		Other^{[a]}		League Cup		Scottish Cup	
No.	Pos	Nat	Player	Apps	Goals	Apps	Goals	Apps	Goals	Apps	Goals	Apps	Goals
	GK	(Scotland) SCO	Michael Andrews	33	0	29+0	0	3+0	0	1+0	0	0+0	0
	GK	(Scotland) SCO	Craig Nelson	10	0	7+0	0	0+0	0	0+0	0	3+0	0
	GK	(Scotland) SCO	Ben Tough	0	0	0+0	0	0+0	0	0+0	0	0+0	0
	DF	(Scotland) SCO	Jonathan Brown	29	6	19+4	5	2+0	0	1+0	0	3+0	1
	DF	(Scotland) SCO	Ross Fisher	1	0	1+0	0	0+0	0	0+0	0	0+0	0
	DF	(Scotland) SCO	Graham Hay	28	2	23+0	2	2+0	0	0+0	0	3+0	0
	DF	(Scotland) SCO	Gerry McLauchlan	32	3	27+0	3	2+1	0	1+0	0	1+0	0
	DF	(Scotland) SCO	Paul McLean	39	3	32+1	3	2+0	0	1+0	0	3+0	0
	DF	(Scotland) SCO	Ewan Moyes	34	2	27+0	2	3+0	0	1+0	0	3+0	0
	DF	(Scotland) SCO	Ian Murray	1	0	1+0	0	0+0	0	0+0	0	0+0	0
	DF	(Scotland) SCO	Alex Pursehouse	14	0	10+2	0	1+1	0	0+0	0	0+0	0
	DF	(Scotland) SCO	Gareth Rodger	4	0	3+0	0	1+0	0	0+0	0	0+0	0
	DF	(Scotland) SCO	Scott Webster	0	0	0+0	0	0+0	0	0+0	0	0+0	0
	MF	(Scotland) SCO	Garry Brady	29	0	17+8	0	1+1	0	1+0	0	1+0	0
	MF	(Scotland) SCO	Greg Cameron	8	0	3+4	0	1+0	0	0+0	0	0+0	0
	MF	(Scotland) SCO	David Crawford	0	0	0+0	0	0+0	0	0+0	0	0+0	0
	MF	(Scotland) SCO	Ryan Ferguson	12	1	8+2	1	2+0	0	0+0	0	0+0	0
	MF	(Scotland) SCO	Gary Fusco	33	0	25+4	0	0+1	0	0+1	0	2+0	0
	MF	(Scotland) SCO	Jordan Lowdon	3	0	1+2	0	0+0	0	0+0	0	0+0	0
	MF	(Scotland) SCO	Craig Molloy	19	0	14+0	0	1+0	0	1+0	0	3+0	0
	MF	(Scotland) SCO	Aaron Murdoch	2	0	1+1	0	0+0	0	0+0	0	0+0	0
	MF	(Scotland) SCO	Allan Smith	3	0	0+3	0	0+0	0	0+0	0	0+0	0
	MF	(Scotland) SCO	Jonny Stewart	38	0	21+10	0	1+2	0	0+1	0	0+3	0
	MF	(Scotland) SCO	Ryan Stewart	29	0	11+12	0	2+0	0	1+0	0	0+3	0
	MF	(Scotland) SCO	Alan Trouten	32	20	25+3	17	2+0	1	0+0	0	2+0	2
	FW	(Republic of Ireland) IRL	Kurtis Byrne	13	4	10+0	2	0+0	0	0+0	0	3+0	2
	FW	(Scotland) SCO	Derek Carcary	34	13	15+12	12	3+0	0	1+0	0	2+1	1
	FW	(Scotland) SCO	Scott Dalziel	17	1	6+8	1	0+1	0	0+1	0	0+1	0
	FW	(Republic of Ireland) IRL	Andy Jackson	42	20	35+0	16	3+0	3	1+0	0	3+0	1
	FW	(Scotland) SCO	Beau Longridge	4	0	3+1	0	0+0	0	0+0	0	0+0	0
	FW	(Scotland) SCO	David McKenna	39	7	22+11	7	1+2	0	1+0	0	1+1	0

a. Includes other competitive competitions, including the play-offs and the Challenge Cup.

=== Disciplinary record ===
Includes all competitive matches.

Last updated 11 May 2013

Nation	Position	Name	Second Division		Other		League Cup		Scottish Cup		Total	
Nation	Position	Name	Booked	Sent off (straight red)	Booked	Sent off (straight red)	Booked	Sent off (straight red)	Booked	Sent off (straight red)	Booked	Sent off (straight red)
(Scotland)	GK	Michael Andrews	0	1	0	0	0	0	0	0	0	1
(Scotland)	GK	Craig Nelson	0	0	0	0	0	0	0	0	0	0
(Scotland)	GK	Ben Tough	0	0	0	0	0	0	0	0	0	0
(Scotland)	DF	Jonathan Brown	7	0	0	0	0	0	0	0	7	0
(Scotland)	DF	Ross Fisher	0	0	0	0	0	0	0	0	0	0
(Scotland)	DF	Graham Hay	5	0	1	0	0	0	0	0	6	0
(Scotland)	DF	Gerry McLauchlan	11	1	0	0	0	1	0	0	11	2
(Scotland)	DF	Paul McLean	8	0	1	0	1	0	1	0	11	0
(Scotland)	DF	Ewan Moyes	9	0	2	0	1	0	1	0	13	0
(Scotland)	DF	Ian Murray	0	0	0	0	0	0	0	0	0	0
(Scotland)	DF	Alex Pursehouse	1	0	0	0	0	0	0	0	1	0
(Scotland)	DF	Gareth Rodger	1	0	0	0	0	0	0	0	1	0
(Scotland)	DF	Scott Webster	0	0	0	0	0	0	0	0	0	0
(Scotland)	MF	Garry Brady	0	0	0	0	0	0	0	0	0	0
(Scotland)	MF	Greg Cameron	2	0	0	0	0	0	0	0	2	0
(Scotland)	MF	David Crawford	0	0	0	0	0	0	0	0	0	0
(Scotland)	MF	Ryan Ferguson	1	0	0	0	0	0	0	0	1	0
(Scotland)	MF	Gary Fusco	8	1	0	0	0	0	0	0	8	1
(Scotland)	MF	Jordan Lowdon	1	0	0	0	0	0	0	0	1	0
(Scotland)	MF	Craig Molloy	4	0	0	0	0	0	0	0	4	0
(Scotland)	MF	Aaron Murdoch	0	0	0	0	0	0	0	0	0	0
(Scotland)	MF	Allan Smith	0	0	0	0	0	0	0	0	0	0
(Scotland)	MF	Jonny Stewart	2	0	0	0	0	0	0	0	1	0
(Scotland)	MF	Ryan Stewart	0	0	1	0	0	0	0	0	1	0
(Scotland)	MF	Alan Trouten	7	0	1	0	0	0	1	0	9	0
(Republic of Ireland)	FW	Kurtis Byrne	2	0	0	0	0	0	0	0	2	0
(Scotland)	FW	Derek Carcary	0	0	0	0	0	0	0	0	0	0
(Scotland)	FW	Scott Dalziel	0	0	0	0	0	0	0	0	0	0
(Republic of Ireland)	FW	Andy Jackson	4	0	0	0	0	0	0	0	4	0
(Scotland)	FW	Beau Longridge	0	0	0	0	0	0	0	0	0	0
(Scotland)	FW	David McKenna	1	0	0	0	0	0	0	0	1	0

== Team statistics ==
=== League table ===
Pos	Team	Pld	W	D	L	GF	GA	GD	Pts	Promotion, qualification or relegation
1	Queen of the South (C, P)	36	29	5	2	92	23	+69	92	Promotion to the Championship
2	Alloa Athletic (O, P)	36	20	7	9	62	35	+27	67	Qualification for the First Division play-offs
3	Brechin City	36	19	4	13	72	59	+13	61	Qualification for the First Division play-offs
4	Forfar Athletic	36	17	3	16	67	74	−7	54	Qualification for the First Division play-offs
5	Arbroath	36	15	7	14	47	57	−10	52	

Source: SPFL Archive
Rules for classification: 1) points; 2) goal difference; 3) number of goals scored.
(C) Champions; (O) Play-off winners; (P) Promoted

=== Division summary ===
Round	1	2	3	4	5	6	7	8	9	10	11	12	13	14	15	16	17	18	19	20	21	22	23	24	25	26	27	28	29	30	31	32	33	34	35	36
Ground	H	A	H	H	A	H	A	A	H	H	A	A	H	A	H	A	A	H	A	A	H	A	A	A	H	H	A	H	A	H	H	A	H	H	H	A
Result	W	L	W	L	L	L	L	L	W	W	D	W	W	L	W	W	W	W	D	W	W	D	W	W	W	L	L	W	L	L	W	L	D	L	W	W
Position	2	6	4	5	6	7	8	8	8	7	7	5	3	5	4	4	3	3	3	3	3	3	3	3	3	3	3	3	3	3	3	3	3	3	3	3

Updated to match(es) played on 8 May 2013. Source:
A = Away; H = Home; W = Win; D = Draw; L = Loss

== Transfers ==
=== Players in ===
Player	To	Fee
(Republic of Ireland) Andy Jackson	(Scotland) Greenock Morton	Free
(Scotland) Scott Dalziel	(Scotland) East Fife	Free
(Scotland) Jonathan Brown	(Scotland) Livingston	Free
(Scotland) Alan Trouten	(Scotland) Ayr United	Free
(Scotland) Ben Tough	Free agent	Free
(Scotland) Michael Andrews	(Scotland) Montrose	Free
(Scotland) Jonny Stewart	(Scotland) Heart of Midlothian	Free
(Scotland) Ryan Stewart	(Scotland) Heart of Midlothian	Free
(Scotland) Aaron Murdoch	(Scotland) Heart of Midlothian	Free
(Republic of Ireland) Kurtis Byrne	(Scotland) Ross County	Loan
(Scotland) Ross Fisher	(Scotland) Kilmarnock	Loan
(Scotland) Allan Smith	(Scotland) Dunfermline Athletic	Loan
(Scotland) Graham Hay	(Scotland) Lochee United	Loan
(Scotland) Graham Hay	(Scotland) Lochee United	Free
(Scotland) Alex Pursehouse	(Scotland) Kilmarnock	Free
(Scotland) Gareth Rodger	(Scotland) St Johnstone	Loan
(Scotland) Ryan Ferguson	(Scotland) Dundee United	Loan

=== Players out ===
Player	To	Fee
(Scotland) Charlie King	(Scotland) Forfar Athletic	Free
(Scotland) Paul McManus	(Scotland) East Fife F.C.	Free
(Scotland) Jim Lister	(Scotland) Dumbarton	Free
(Scotland) Mick Dunlop	(Scotland) Stranraer	Free
(Scotland) Bryan Hodge	(Scotland) Stenhousemuir	Free
(Scotland) Scott Buist	(Scotland) Stenhousemuir	Free
(Scotland) David McClune	(Scotland) Stirling Albion	Free
(Scotland) Craig Mitchell	(Scotland) Newburgh	Free
(Scotland) David Scott	(Scotland) Forfar Athletic	Free
(Scotland) Ben Tough	(Scotland) Luncarty	Loan
(Scotland) Scott Dalziel	(Scotland) Berwick Rangers	Free
