= 2010–11 Brechin City F.C. season =

Brechin City
2010–11 season
- Chairman: Kenneth Ferguson
- Manager: Jim Weir
- Stadium: Glebe Park
- Second Division: Fourth place
- Challenge Cup: First round, lost to East Fife
- League Cup: Third round, lost to Motherwell
- Scottish Cup: Quarter-final, lost to St Johnstone
- Top goalscorer: League: Rory McAllister (19); All: Rory McAllister (29)
- Highest home attendance: 825 vs. Forfar Athletic, 23 April 2011
- Lowest home attendance: 394 vs. Ayr United, 12 April 2011
- Average home league attendance: 514

The 2010–11 season was Brechin City's fifth consecutive season in the Scottish Second Division, having been relegated from the Scottish First Division at the end of the 2005–06 season. Brechin also competed in the Challenge Cup, League Cup and the Scottish Cup.

== Summary ==
Dumbarton finished fourth in the Second Division, entering the play-offs losing 3–2 to Ayr United on aggregate in the final and remained in the Second Division. They reached the first of the Scottish Challenge Cup, the third round of the League Cup and the Quarter-final of the Scottish Cup.

=== Management ===
Brechin City were managed by Jim Weir, following the resignation of Jim Duffy at the end of the previous season.

== Results and fixtures ==
Win Draw Loss

=== Scottish Second Division ===
| 7 August 2010 | Ayr United | 0–2 | Brechin City | Somerset Park |
| | | SFL Report | McLauchlan 7'; Molloy 85' | Attendance: 1,212; Referee: McLean |

| 14 August 2010 | Brechin City | 0–0 | Stenhousemuir | Glebe Park |
| | | BBC Report | | Attendance: 404; Referee: Allan |

| 21 August 2010 | Forfar Athletic | 1–1 | Brechin City | Station Park |
| | Templeman 59' | BBC Report | King 77' | Attendance: 782; Referee: Salmond |

| 28 August 2010 | Brechin City | 3–1 | Alloa Athletic | Glebe Park |
| | Booth 20'; McAllister 21', 81' | BBC Report | Gormley 29' | Attendance: 418; Referee: Tumilty |

| 11 September 2010 | Airdrie United | 1–1 | Brechin City | Excelsior Stadium |
| | Gibson 53'; Gibson (yellow card) 78' (red card) | SFL Report | Byers 23'; McAllister (yellow card) 56' (red card) | Attendance: 946; Referee: Northcroft |

| 18 September 2010 | Brechin City | 1–3 | Livingston | Glebe Park |
| 15:00 | Moyes 90' | BBC Report | Russell 43'; Barr 45'; De Vita 74' | Attendance: 526; Referee: Smith |

| 25 September 2010 | Dumbarton | 1–3 | Brechin City | Strathclyde Homes Stadium |
| | Carcary 73' | BBC Report | Booth 36'; McKenna 40'; McAllister 88' | Attendance: 626; Referee: Beaton |

| 2 October 2010 | Brechin City | 4–2 | Peterhead | Glebe Park |
| | Molloy 2'; McAllister 39', 58', 66' | SFL Report | Wyness 11' (pen.); Bavidge 91' | Attendance: 473; Referee: Clancy |

| 16 October 2010 | East Fife | 1–3 | Brechin City | Bayview Stadium |
| | Linn 14' | BBC Report | Molloy 42'; McKenna 56', 63' | Attendance: 336; Referee: Colvin |

| 23 October 2010 | Brechin City | 3–1 | Airdrie United | Glebe Park |
| | Janczyk 20'; McAllister 53'; Molloy 94' | SFL Report | Watt 26' | Attendance: 564; Referee: Somers |

| 30 October 2010 | Alloa Athletic | 2–2 | Brechin City | Recreation Park |
| | Dunlop 36'; Prunty 55' | BBC Report | Byers 22'; Bolger 69' | Attendance: 513; Referee: Muir |

| 6 November 2010 | Stenhousemuir | 0–0 | Brechin City | Ochilview Park |
| | | BBC Report | | Attendance: 491; Referee: Smith |

| 13 November 2010 | Brechin City | 0–0 | Forfar Athletic | Glebe Park |
| | | BBC Report | | Attendance: 786; Referee: McKendrick |

| 11 December 2010 | Peterhead | 0–5 | Brechin City | Balmoor |
| | Anderson (red card) 36' | SFL Report | McAllister 6', 34' (pen.), 58', 79'; Archdeacon 91' | Attendance: 466; Referee: McLean |

| 15 January 2011 | Airdrie United | 2–2 | Brechin City | Excelsior Stadium |
| | Ferguson 48'; Forrest 55' | SFL Report | Janczyk 49'; McLean 87' | Attendance: 806; Referee: Colvin |

| 29 January 2011 | Dumbarton | 1–2 | Brechin City | Strathclyde Homes Stadium |
| | McNiff (yellow card) 59' (red card); Gilhaney 86' | BBC Report | Hill 22'; Molloy 72' | Attendance: 565; Referee: Hilland |

| 1 February 2011 | Livingston | 2–0 | Brechin City | Braidwood Motor Company Stadium |
| 19:45 | Russell; Winters | Liv Report | | Attendance: 847; Referee: Richmond |

| 12 February 2011 | Brechin City | 3–1 | Peterhead | Glebe Park |
| | McKenna 52', 70'; McLean (yellow card) 77' (red card); Redman 88' | SFL Report | Strachan 32' | Attendance: 503; Referee: Beaton |

| 19 February 2011 | East Fife | 0–0 | Brechin City | Bayview Stadium |
| | | BBC Report | | Attendance: 526; Referee: Clancy |

| 22 February 2011 | Brechin City | 1–0 | Livingston | Glebe Park |
| 19:45 | Molloy | Liv Report | | Attendance: 565; Referee: Law |

| 26 February 2011 | Ayr United | 2–0 | Brechin City | Somerset Park |
| | Bannigan 45+3'; McLaughlin 63' | BBC Report | | Attendance: 1,092; Referee: Hilland |

| 1 March 2011 | Brechin City | 3–3 | Dumbarton | Glebe Park |
| | Byers 9', 64'; McAllister 69' | BBC Report | McShane 11', 85'; Walker 65' | Attendance: 411; Referee: Robertson |

| 5 March 2011 | Brechin City | 3–1 | Stenhousemuir | Glebe Park |
| | McAllister 43'; Redman 55'; Janczyk 82' | BBC Report | Dalziel 8' | Attendance: 503; Referee: Finnie |

| 8 March 2011 | Forfar Athletic | 2–1 | Brechin City | Station Park |
| | Templeman 86'; R Campbell 93' | BBC Report | Moyes 65' | Attendance: 604; Referee: Watters |

| 19 March 2011 | Alloa Athletic | 2–2 | Brechin City | Recreation Park |
| | Walker 22'; Lister 48' | SFL Report | McKenna 9'; Moyes 68' | Attendance: 375; Referee: Smith |

| 26 March 2011 | Brechin City | 6–0 | Dumbarton | Glebe Park |
| | McKenna 7', 79', 85'; Redman 46'; McAllister 52'; Megginson 83' | BBC Report | | Attendance: 514; Referee: Somers |

| 29 March 2011 | Brechin City | 3–2 | Alloa Athletic | Glebe Park |
| | McAllister 4'; Molloy 14'; Janczyk 78' | BBC Report | Lister 40'; McGowan 92' (pen.) | Attendance: 411; Referee: Madden |

| 2 April 2011 | Livingston | 0–0 | Brechin City | Braidwood Motor Company Stadium |
| 15:00 | | BBC Report | | Attendance: 1,553; Referee: Winter |

| 5 April 2011 | Brechin City | 1–2 | Airdrie United | Glebe Park |
| | McKenna 46' | SFL Report | McLauchlan 32' (o.g.); Donnelly 56' | Attendance: 438; Referee: McKendrick |

| 9 April 2011 | Brechin City | 1–3 | East Fife | Glebe Park |
| | Moyes 61' | BBC Report | McCulloch 27'; Cook 52' (o.g.); Wallace 71' | Attendance: 504; Referee: Finnie |

| 12 April 2011 | Brechin City | 0–3 | Ayr United | Glebe Park |
| | | BBC Report | Moffat 33'; Roberts 35' (pen.); Crawford 85' | Attendance: 394; Referee: McDermott |

| 16 April 2011 | Peterhead | 1–1 | Brechin City | Balmoor |
| | Clark 42' | SFL Report | Megginson 39' | Attendance: 498; Referee: Roache |

| 19 April 2011 | Brechin City | 2–3 | East Fife | Glebe Park |
| | Redman 54'; Molloy 58' (pen.) | BBC Report | McGowan 52'; Wallace 62' (pen.), 83' | Attendance: 441; Referee: Charleston |

| 23 April 2011 | Brechin City | 0–1 | Forfar Athletic | Glebe Park |
| | McKenna (red card) 25' | BBC Report | Hilson 58' | Attendance: 825; Referee: Northcroft |

| 30 April 2011 | Stenhousemuir | 1–3 | Brechin City | Ochilview Park |
| | Devlin 27'; McCluskey (yellow card) 94' (red card) | BBC Report | McAllister 5' (pen.), 45', 96' (pen.) | Attendance: 672; Referee: Clancy |

| 7 May 2011 | Brechin City | 1–0 | Ayr United | Glebe Park |
| | McAllister 19' | BBC Report | | Attendance: 577; Referee: Norris |

=== First Division play-offs ===
| 11 May 2011 Semi-final, first leg | Brechin City | 2–2 | Cowdenbeath | Glebe Park |
| | Kirkpatrick 46'; Megginson 51' | BBC Report | Linton 4'; Coult 26' | Attendance: 596; Referee: Law |

| 14 May 2011 Semi-final, second leg | Cowdenbeath | 0–2 (2–4 agg.) | Brechin City | Central Park |
| | | BBC Report | Redman 78'; Molloy 84' | Attendance: 645; Referee: Somers |

| 18 May 2011 Final, first leg | Ayr United | 1–1 | Brechin City | Somerset Park |
| | Moffat 31' | BBC Repport | Janczyk 86' | Attendance: 2,020; Referee: Conroy |

| 22 May 2011 Final, second leg | Brechin City | 1–2 (2–3 agg.) | Ayr United | Glebe Park |
| | Tiffoney 44' (o.g.) | BBC Report | Roberts 76'; Moffat 88' | Attendance: 2,404; Referee: Allan |

=== Scottish Challenge Cup ===
| 24 July 2010 First round | East Fife | 4–3 (a.e.t.) | Brechin City | Bayview Stadium |
| | Sloan 56' (pen.); Crawford 88'; Eurie 93'; Linn 119'; Bryce (red card) 103' | SFL Report | McAllister 27'; Janczyk 90'; Moyes 101'; Nelson (red card) 55' | Attendance: 497; Referee: Robertson |

=== Scottish League Cup ===
| 31 July 2010 First round | Stenhousemuir | 1–3 | Brechin City | Ochilview Park |
| | Anderson 8' | BBC Report | McLauchlan 18'; Molloy 29'; McAllister 53' | Attendance: 384; Referee: Beaton |

| 24 August 2010 Second round | Brechin City | 2–2 (a.e.t.) (3–1 p) | Dundee | Glebe Park |
| | McLean (yellow card) 31' (yellow-red card) 57'; McAllister 63', 64' | BBC Report | Griffiths 71', 74'; Forsyth (red card) 120' | Attendance: 1,090; Referee: Finnie |
| | Penalties |
| | McAllister (penalty scored); Booth (penalty scored); Docherty (penalty missed); Byers (penalty scored) | | Harkins (penalty scored); Paton (penalty missed); O'Donnell (penalty missed); Riley (penalty missed) |

| 21 September 2010 Third round | Brechin City | 0–2 | Motherwell | Glebe Park |
| | | SFL Report | Page 16', 59' | Attendance: 903; Referee: Mclean |

=== Scottish Cup ===
| 20 November 2010 Third round | Brechin City | 2–2 | Annan Athletic | Glebe Park |
| | McKenna 32', 57' | BBC Report | Muirhead 52'; Gilfillan 68' | Attendance: 402; Referee: Madden |

| 4 January 2011 Third round replay | Annan Athletic | 2–5 | Brechin City | Galabank |
| | Gilfillan 6'; Aitken 55' | BBC Report | McAllister 2', 83'; Molloy 23'; McKenna 37'; Byers 41' | Attendance: 512; Referee: Madden |

| 11 January 2011 Fourth round | Queen of the South | 1–2 | Brechin City | Palmerston Park |
| | McMenamin 66' | BBC Report | Byers 17'; McAllister 35' | Attendance: 1,169; Referee: Nicholls |

| 5 February 2011 Fifth round | Buckie Thistle | 0–2 | Brechin City | Victoria Park |
| | | BBC Report | McKenna 18'; McAllister 30' | Attendance: 1,482; Referee: Mclean |

| 12 March 2011 Quarter-final | Brechin City | 2–2 | St Johnstone | Glebe Park |
| | McAllister 42' (pen.), 78' | BBC Report | Millar 48'; Invincibile 62' | Attendance: 3,472; Referee: Conroy |

| 22 March 2011 Quarter-final replay | St Johnstone | 1–0 | Brechin City | McDiarmid Park |
| | Samuel 37' | BBC Report | | Attendance: 3,891; Referee: Conroy |

== Player statistics ==
=== Squad ===
| No. | Pos | Nat | Player | Total | | Second Division | | Other^{[Note1]} | | League Cup | | Scottish Cup | |
| No. | Pos | Nat | Player | Apps | Goals | Apps | Goals | Apps | Goals | Apps | Goals | Apps | Goals |
|---|---|---|---|---|---|---|---|---|---|---|---|---|---|
| | GK | (Scotland) SCO | Craig Nelson | 46 | 0 | 33+0 | 0 | 5+0 | 0 | 2+0 | 0 | 6+0 | 0 |
| | GK | (Scotland) SCO | David Scott | 6 | 0 | 3+0 | 0 | 0+1 | 0 | 1+0 | 0 | 0+1 | 0 |
| | DF | (Scotland) SCO | Callum Booth | 15 | 2 | 11+0 | 2 | 1+0 | 0 | 2+1 | 0 | 0+0 | 0 |
| | DF | (Hong Kong) HKG | Andrew Cook | 47 | 0 | 34+2 | 0 | 4+0 | 0 | 2+0 | 0 | 5+0 | 0 |
| | DF | (Scotland) SCO | Dougie Hill | 5 | 1 | 4+0 | 1 | 0+0 | 0 | 0+0 | 0 | 1+0 | 0 |
| | DF | (Scotland) SCO | Roy McBain | 14 | 0 | 11+0 | 0 | 3+0 | 0 | 0+0 | 0 | 0+0 | 0 |
| | DF | (Scotland) SCO | Gerry McLauchlan | 41 | 2 | 29+0 | 1 | 5+0 | 0 | 3+0 | 1 | 4+0 | 0 |
| | DF | (Scotland) SCO | Paul McLean | 38 | 1 | 25+2 | 1 | 2+1 | 0 | 2+0 | 0 | 6+0 | 0 |
| | DF | (Scotland) SCO | Ewan Moyes | 46 | 5 | 33+0 | 4 | 5+0 | 1 | 3+0 | 0 | 5+0 | 0 |
| | DF | (Scotland) SCO | Barry Smith | 11 | 0 | 5+3 | 0 | 1+0 | 0 | 2+0 | 0 | 0+0 | 0 |
| | DF | (Scotland) SCO | David White | 17 | 0 | 9+2 | 0 | 0+1 | 0 | 1+0 | 0 | 3+1 | 0 |
| | MF | (Scotland) SCO | Kevin Byers | 37 | 6 | 19+6 | 4 | 0+3 | 0 | 1+2 | 0 | 5+1 | 2 |
| | MF | (Scotland) SCO | Mark Docherty | 16 | 0 | 4+6 | 0 | 0+1 | 0 | 1+1 | 0 | 2+1 | 0 |
| | MF | (Scotland) SCO | Gary Fusco | 40 | 0 | 17+11 | 0 | 3+2 | 0 | 0+1 | 0 | 3+3 | 0 |
| | MF | (Scotland) SCO | Connor Gray | 1 | 0 | 0+1 | 0 | 0+0 | 0 | 0+0 | 0 | 0+0 | 0 |
| | MF | (Scotland) SCO | Jordan Kirkpatrick | 18 | 1 | 3+11 | 0 | 2+2 | 1 | 0+0 | 0 | 0+0 | 0 |
| | MF | (Scotland) SCO | Neil Janczyk | 47 | 6 | 31+2 | 4 | 3+2 | 2 | 3+0 | 0 | 6+0 | 0 |
| | MF | (Scotland) SCO | Craig Molloy | 48 | 11 | 34+0 | 8 | 5+0 | 1 | 3+0 | 1 | 6+0 | 1 |
| | MF | (Scotland) SCO | Paul Mulrooney | 3 | 0 | 0+2 | 0 | 0+0 | 0 | 0+0 | 0 | 1+0 | 0 |
| | MF | (Scotland) SCO | Jamie Redman | 35 | 5 | 19+6 | 4 | 4+0 | 1 | 1+0 | 0 | 1+4 | 0 |
| | FW | (Scotland) SCO | Mark Archdeacon | 12 | 1 | 1+8 | 1 | 0+0 | 0 | 0+0 | 0 | 0+3 | 0 |
| | FW | (Ireland) EIR | Anthony Bolger | 3 | 1 | 0+3 | 1 | 0+0 | 0 | 0+0 | 0 | 0+0 | 0 |
| | FW | (Scotland) SCO | Charlie King | 11 | 1 | 4+4 | 1 | 1+0 | 0 | 1+1 | 0 | 0+0 | 0 |
| | FW | (Scotland) SCO | Rory McAllister | 43 | 29 | 29+0 | 19 | 5+0 | 1 | 3+0 | 3 | 6+0 | 6 |
| | FW | (Scotland) SCO | Daniel McKay | 18 | 0 | 2+14 | 0 | 0+0 | 0 | 0+0 | 0 | 0+2 | 0 |
| | FW | (Scotland) SCO | David McKenna | 46 | 14 | 27+7 | 10 | 3+1 | 0 | 2+1 | 0 | 5+0 | 4 |
| | FW | (Scotland) SCO | Mitchel Megginson | 18 | 3 | 9+5 | 2 | 3+1 | 1 | 0+0 | 0 | 0+0 | 0 |

== League table ==
| Pos | Team | Pld | W | D | L | GF | GA | GD | Pts | Promotion, qualification or relegation |
|---|---|---|---|---|---|---|---|---|---|---|
| 2 | Ayr United (O, P) | 36 | 18 | 5 | 13 | 62 | 55 | +7 | 59 | Qualification for the First Division play-offs |
| 3 | Forfar Athletic | 36 | 17 | 8 | 11 | 50 | 48 | +2 | 59 | Qualification for the First Division play-offs |
| 4 | Brechin City | 36 | 15 | 12 | 9 | 63 | 45 | +18 | 57 | Qualification for the First Division play-offs |
| 5 | East Fife | 36 | 14 | 10 | 12 | 77 | 60 | +17 | 52 | |
| 6 | Airdrie United | 36 | 13 | 9 | 14 | 52 | 60 | −8 | 48 | |

Source: SPFL
Rules for classification: 1) points; 2) goal difference; 3) number of goals scored.
(O) Play-off winners; (P) Promoted

== Notes ==
Note1. Includes other competitive competitions, including Challenge Cup and First Division play-offs
