= Alan Trouten =

Scottish footballer (born 1985)

Personal information
- Date of birth: 8 November 1985 (age 41)
- Place of birth: Rutherglen, Scotland
- Positions: Midfielder; forward

Team information
- Current team: Benburb

Youth career
- Greenock Morton

Senior career*
Years	Team	Apps	(Gls)
2003–2004	Greenock Morton	0	(0)
2004–2008	Queen's Park	116	(27)
2008–2009	Clyde	27	(4)
2009–2010	Airdrie United	26	(2)
2010–2012	Ayr United	55	(6)
2012–2015	Brechin City	80	(44)
2015–2016	Ayr United	31	(6)
2016–2017	Brechin City	26	(5)
2017–2018	Albion Rovers	33	(20)
2018–2022	Alloa Athletic	74	(23)
2022–2026	East Fife	107	(43)
- * Club domestic league appearances and goals as of 4 May 2026

Alan Trouten (born 8 November 1985) is a Scottish footballer who used to play as a midfielder or forward for Benburb. During his career spent mainly in the second and third levels of the Scottish football league system, Trouten has played for Greenock Morton, Queen's Park, Clyde, Airdrie United, Albion Rovers, Alloa Athletic and East Fife, as well as having two spells at both Ayr United and Brechin City.

== Career ==
Born in Rutherglen, Trouten began his career with Greenock Morton, but failed to make an appearance with them and joined Queen's Park. During his time at Queen's Park, he won the Scottish Football League Young Player of the Month award in February 2005, and was in the Spiders' squad which eliminated SPL club Aberdeen from the 2006–07 Scottish League Cup, scoring the clinching kick in the penalty shoot-out.

He joined Scottish First Division club Clyde on 2 June 2008. He made a dream start to his Clyde career in July 2008, scoring both goals in a 2–0 victory over Annan Athletic in the Scottish Challenge Cup. Trouten's contract was terminated in June 2009, following Clyde's relegation and financial troubles.

Trouten made a guest appearance for Shamrock Rovers in a friendly against Newcastle United on 11 July 2009 at Tallaght Stadium. On 22 July 2009, it was announced that Trouten had signed for Airdrie United. He was released along with the full Airdrie squad after their relegation in the 2009–10 season, and then subsequently signed a one-year deal with Ayr United.

Trouten signed for Brechin City at the start of the 2012–13 season. At the end of the season, he was voted into the Second Division Team of the Year. Ahead of the 2015–16 season, he re-signed for former club Ayr United. He was released after one season with the Honest Men. In June 2016, Trouten returned to Brechin City, playing with the club for the 2016–17 season before leaving on 30 May 2017.

After leaving Glebe Park, Trouten signed for Scottish League One side Albion Rovers on 6 June 2017. He quickly endeared himself to his new supporters by scoring seven goals in four games during the early-season 2017–18 Scottish League Cup group stage, including a hat-trick in a 4–4 draw with top-tier Hamilton Academical and the winning penalty in the resulting shootout, although it was not enough for the Wee Rovers to advance in the competition. By January 2018, his tally was 24 goals in 24 games, making him the nation's leading goalscorer (alongside Rory McAllister, a dedicated striker). By the end of the season he had scored 28 in all competitions, but Albion Rovers were relegated having finished bottom of Scottish League One.

With Trouten out of contract at Rovers, he joined Alloa Athletic in the summer of 2018. At the start of his fourth season with the Wasps (now relegated to the third tier after three seasons in the Championship), 35-year-old Trouten was again involved in a win over Premiership opposition, this time scoring the winning goal via a penalty against Livingston in the 2021–22 Scottish League Cup group stage.

Trouten signed for East Fife in June 2022, having already made 500 senior appearances; it would be his first time playing in the fourth tier since his breakthrough spell with Queen's Park 15 years earlier. He was named the Scottish League Two Player of the Month for March 2024.

Trouten moved on from East Fife and joined scottish lowland league west side Benburb with the Glasgow Govan outfits in summer 2026.

== Career statistics ==
As of 17 February 2026

Appearances and goals by club, season and competition
Club	Season	League			Scottish Cup		League Cup		Other		Total	
Club	Season	Division	Apps	Goals	Apps	Goals	Apps	Goals	Apps	Goals	Apps	Goals
Queen's Park	2003–04	Scottish Third Division	1	0	0	0	0	0	0	0	1	0
Queen's Park	2004–05	Scottish Third Division	31	3	1	0	0	0	2 (Note: Appearances in the Scottish Challenge Cup)	0	34	3
Queen's Park	2005–06	Scottish Third Division	25	4	2	1	0	0	0	0	27	5
Queen's Park	2006–07	Scottish Third Division	26	8	2	0	2	0	6 (Note: Two appearances in the Scottish Challenge Cup and four appearances and three goals in the Second Division play-offs)	3	36	11
Queen's Park	2007–08	Scottish Second Division	33	12	2	1	2	1	1	0	38	14
Queen's Park	Total		116	27	7	2	4	1	9	3	136	33
Clyde	2008–09	Scottish First Division	27	4	2	0	2	0	3	2	34	6
Airdrie United	2009–10	Scottish First Division	26	2	3	2	1	0	2 (Note: One appearance in the Scottish Challenge Cup and one in the First Division play-offs)	0	32	4
Ayr United	2010–11	Scottish Second Division	32	5	2	0	1	0	7 (Note: Three appearances and one goal in the Scottish Challenge Cup and four appearances and one goal in the First Division play-offs)	2	42	7
Ayr United	2011–12	Scottish First Division	23	1	4	3	4	1	5 (Note: Three appearances in the Scottish Challenge Cup and two appearances in the First Division play-offs)	0	36	5
Ayr United	Total		55	6	6	3	5	1	12	2	78	12
Brechin City	2012–13	Scottish Second Division	28	17	0	0	0	0	2 (Note: Appearances in the First Division play-offs)	1	30	18
Brechin City	2013–14	Scottish League One	26	12	3	3	1	0	1	0	31	15
Brechin City	2014–15	Scottish League One	26	15	3	1	1	0	4 (Note: Two appearances and a goal in the Scottish Challenge Cup and two appearances and a goal in the Championship play-offs)	2	34	18
Brechin City	Total		80	44	6	4	2	0	7	3	95	51
Ayr United	2015–16	Scottish League One	31	6	1	0	2	0	5 (Note: Two appearances and a goal in the Scottish Challenge Cup and three appearances in the Championship play-offs)	1	39	7
Brechin City	2016–17	Scottish League One	26	5	0	0	4	2	2 (Note: Appearances in the Championship play-offs)	1	32	8
Albion Rovers	2017–18	Scottish League One	33	20	1	1	4	7	1	0	39	28
Alloa Athletic	2018–19	Scottish Championship	34	10	2	2	4	3	4	4	44	19
Alloa Athletic	2019–20	Scottish Championship	22	8	1	0	4	3	2	1	29	12
Alloa Athletic	2020–21	Scottish Championship	19	5	1	1	5	2	0	0	25	8
Alloa Athletic	2021–22	Scottish League One	5	0	1	0	1	1	2	1	9	2
Alloa Athletic	Total		80	23	5	3	14	9	8	6	107	41
East Fife	2022–23	Scottish League Two	30	10	1	0	1	0	4 (Note: 2 appearances, 1 goal in Scottish Challenge Cup, 2 appearances in the League One play-offs)	1	36	11
East Fife	2023–24	Scottish League Two	34	11	1	0	3	0	3	1	41	12
East Fife	2024–25	Scottish League Two	33	22	1	0	3	4	6 (Note: 2 Appearances in Challenge Cup, 4 appearances and 2 goals in League One play-offs)	2	43	28
East Fife	2025–26	Scottish League One	10	0	1	0	4	3	1	0	16	3
East Fife	Total		107	43	4	0	11	7	14	4	136	54
Career total			547	158	35	15	49	26	63	22	684	216

== See also ==
- List of footballers in Scotland by number of league appearances (500+)
