= Gary Fusco =

Scottish footballer

Personal information
- Date of birth: 1 June 1982 (age 44)
- Place of birth: Edinburgh, Scotland
- Position: Midfielder

Senior career*
Years	Team	Apps	(Gls)
2002–2007	Cowdenbeath	120	(4)
2007–2013	Brechin City	157	(3)
2013–2014	Forfar Athletic	31	(0)
2014–2018	Brechin City	103	(0)
- * Club domestic league appearances and goals as of 23:42, 10 May 2018 (UTC)

Gary Fusco (born 1 June 1982) is a Scottish professional footballer who plays as a midfielder. Fusco previously played for Cowdenbeath, Forfar Athletic, and had two spells with Brechin City.

== Career statistics ==
As of match played 2 January 2018

Appearances and goals by club, season and competition
Club	Season	League			Scottish Cup		League Cup		Other		Total	
Club	Season	Division	Apps	Goals	Apps	Goals	Apps	Goals	Apps	Goals	Apps	Goals
Cowdenbeath	2002–03	Second Division	7	0	0	0	0	0	0	0	7	0
Cowdenbeath	2003–04	Third Division	25	0	3	1	1	0	0	0	29	1
Cowdenbeath	2004–05	Third Division	34	4	1	0	1	0	2 (Note: Appearances in the Scottish Challenge Cup)	0	38	4
Cowdenbeath	2005–06	Third Division	30	0	0	0	1	0	1	0	32	0
Cowdenbeath	2006–07	Second Division	24	0	3	0	1	0	2	0	30	0
Cowdenbeath	Cowdenbeath total		120	4	7	1	4	0	5	0	136	5
Brechin City	2007–08	Second Division	16	1	4	0	0	0	2	0	22	1
Brechin City	2008–09	Second Division	19	0	1	0	0	0	2 (Note: Appearances in the First Division play-offs)	0	22	0
Brechin City	2009–10	Second Division	36	1	1	0	1	0	5 (Note: One appearance in the Scottish Challenge Cup and four in the First Division play-offs)	0	43	1
Brechin City	2010–11	Second Division	28	0	4	0	1	0	4 (Note: Appearances in the First Division play-offs)	0	37	0
Brechin City	2011–13	Second Division	29	1	1	0	0	0	1	0	31	1
Brechin City	2012–13	Second Division	29	0	1	0	1	0	1	0	32	0
Brechin City	Brechin City total I		157	3	12	0	3	0	15	0	187	3
Forfar Athletic	2013–14	League One	31	0	4	0	1	0	0	0	36	0
Forfar Athletic	Forfar total		31	0	4	0	1	0	0	0	36	0
Brechin City	2014–15	League One	33	0	4	0	1	0	3 (Note: Two appearances in the Scottish Challenge Cup and one in the Championship play-offs)	0	41	0
Brechin City	2015–16	League One	31	0	1	0	1	0	0	0	33	0
Brechin City	2016–17	League One	21	0	1	0	0	0	4 (Note: Appearances in the Championship play-offs)	0	26	0
Brechin City	2017–18	Championship	10	0	1	0	2	0	1	0	14	0
Brechin City	Brechin City total II		95	0	7	0	4	0	8	0	114	0
Career total			403	7	30	1	12	0	28	0	473	8
