= 2018–19 East Superleague =

McBookie.com East Superleague
- Season: 2018–19
- Dates: 4 August 2018 – 27 May 2019
- Champions: Lochee United
- Matches: 132
- Goals: 521 (3.95 per match)
- Biggest home win: Fauldhouse United 7–0 Kirriemuir Thistle (20 April 2019)
- Biggest away win: Kirriemuir Thistle 0–8 Lochee United (25 August 2018)
- Highest scoring: Downfield 5–6 Broughty Athletic (13 May 2019)
- Longest winning run: 12 matches: Lochee United
- Longest unbeaten run: 22 matches: Lochee United
- Longest winless run: 8 matches: Glenrothes
- Longest losing run: 5 matches: Kennoway Star Hearts; Glenrothes
- All statistics correct as of 27 May 2019.

The 2018–19 East Super League (known as the McBookie.com East Superleague for sponsorship reasons) was the 17th season of the East Superleague, the top tier of league competition for SJFA East Region member clubs.

The season began on 4 August 2018 and ended on 27 May 2019. Bonnyrigg Rose were the reigning champions but they couldn’t defend their title after moving to the East of Scotland Football League.

Lochee United won their third title with two games remaining on 20 May 2019 after a 2–0 win away to Forfar West End, before going on to end the season unbeaten. They enter the 2019–20 Scottish Cup as winners at the preliminary round stage.

== Teams ==
Location of teams in 2018–19 East Super League
Location of teams in 2018–19 East Super League within Dundee
Location of teams in 2018–19 East Super League within Fife

For the 2018–19 season, the Superleague was reduced from sixteen to twelve teams by the league’s reconstruction after 24 Junior clubs moved to the East of Scotland Football League

The following teams changed division after the 2017–18 season.

=== To East Superleague ===
Promoted from East Premier League

- Downfield
- Fauldhouse United
- Glenrothes
- Kirriemuir Thistle
- Tayport
- Thornton Hibs
- Whitburn

=== From East Superleague ===
Transferred to East of Scotland League

- Bo'ness United
- Bonnyrigg Rose Athletic
- Broxburn Athletic
- Camelon Juniors
- Dundonald Bluebell
- Hill of Beath Hawthorn
- Jeanfield Swifts
- Linlithgow Rose
- Newtongrange Star
- Penicuik Athletic
- Sauchie Juniors

=== Stadia and locations ===
Club	Location	Home Ground	Capacity	Seats	Floodlit	Manager	Finishing position 2017–18
Broughty Athletic	Dundee	Whitton Park	2,500	0	No	Jamie McCunnie	10th
Carnoustie Panmure	Carnoustie	Laing Park	1,500	0	No	Phil McGuire	12th
Downfield	Dundee	Downfield Park	2,500	13	Yes	Paul Marr	10th in Premier League
Fauldhouse United	Fauldhouse	Park View	2,000		No	Jon Connolly	2nd in Premier League
Forfar West End	Forfar	Strathmore Park	2,500	0	No	Daryl McKenzie	16th
Glenrothes	Glenrothes	Warout Stadium	5,000	730	No	Barry Cockburn & Kevin Smith	9th in Premier League
Kennoway Star Hearts	Star	Treaton Park	1,000	0	Yes	Kevin Byers	15th
Kirriemuir Thistle	Kirriemuir	Westview Park	2,000	32	Yes	Chris Kettles	16th in Premier League
Lochee United	Dundee	Thomson Park	3,200	0	No	George Shields	6th
Tayport	Tayport	Canniepairt	2,000	0	No	Stevie Kay	4th in Premier League
Thornton Hibs	Thornton	Memorial Park	1,800	0	No	Craig Gilbert	6th in Premier League
Whitburn	Whitburn	Central Park	3,000	38	No	Jason Bolam	15th in Premier League

=== Managerial changes ===
Club	Outgoing manager	Manner of departure	Date of vacancy	Position in table	Incoming manager	Date of appointment
Kennoway Star Hearts	Craig Johnstone	Resigned	11 September 2018	12th	Kevin Byers	1 October 2018
Glenrothes	Willie Campbell	Resigned	16 September 2018	9th	Barry Cockburn & Kevin Smith	3 October 2018
Carnoustie Panmure	Alan McSkimming	Resigned	17 September 2018	7th	Phil McGuire	26 September 2018
Tayport	Charlie King	Mutual consent	29 October 2018	6th	Stevie Kay	12 November 2018

== League table ==
Pos	Team	Pld	W	D	L	GF	GA	GD	Pts	Qualification or relegation
1	Lochee United (C)	22	20	2	0	71	11	+60	62	Qualification for 2019–20 Scottish Cup
2	Broughty Athletic	22	17	2	3	55	21	+34	53	
3	Thornton Hibs	22	12	2	8	51	37	+14	38	
4	Whitburn Juniors	22	11	3	8	58	53	+5	36	
5	Tayport	22	10	3	9	42	37	+5	33	
6	Forfar West End	22	8	5	9	37	36	+1	29	
7	Carnoustie Panmure	22	8	4	10	37	43	−6	28	
8	Kennoway Star Hearts	22	8	2	12	38	39	−1	26	
9	Kirriemuir Thistle	22	6	4	12	41	62	−21	22	
10	Fauldhouse United	22	5	4	13	34	56	−22	19	
11	Downfield	22	6	1	15	33	61	−28	19	
12	Glenrothes	22	3	4	15	24	65	−41	13	Resigned membership, joined East of Scotland League

Source: East Region SJFA
Rules for classification: 1) Points; 2) Goal difference; 3) Goals scored
(C) Champions

== Results ==
Home \ Away	BRO	CAR	DOW	FAU	FWE	GLE	KSH	KIR	LOC	TAY	THO	WHI
Broughty Athletic		5–0	5–0	2–0	1–0	5–1	0–0	2–0	0–2	1–0	3–1	4–3
Carnoustie Panmure	1–2		2–3	2–2	2–0	2–0	2–0	2–2	0–4	1–1	3–0	5–4
Downfield	5–6	1–0		4–1	0–2	4–0	2–3	2–2	0–3	0–2	1–6	3–1
Fauldhouse United	0–3	3–0	3–1		3–2	2–2	0–1	7–0	0–4	1–1	0–4	1–2
Forfar West End	1–2	1–1	1–0	2–1		6–0	2–1	2–1	0–2	2–2	1–1	1–3
Glenrothes	0–2	1–5	0–1	3–1	1–1		1–5	3–3	1–2	2–0	0–5	3–2
Kennoway Star Hearts	0–1	2–4	2–0	4–0	0–3	3–0		4–0	0–2	3–5	0–1	2–3
Kirriemuir Thistle	1–0	4–1	4–0	1–3	5–3	5–0	2–3		0–8	2–1	0–4	3–4
Lochee United	2–2	2–1	5–1	5–0	2–2	4–1	2–1	3–0		3–0	6–1	6–1
Tayport	3–2	4–1	3–1	4–1	2–1	4–3	3–1	3–0	0–2		0–3	1–2
Thornton Hibs	0–4	0–1	5–2	6–2	1–4	1–0	2–2	3–2	0–1	2–1		5–2
Whitburn	1–3	2–1	5–2	3–3	5–0	2–2	4–1	4–4	0–1	3–2	2–0	

Updated to match(es) played on 27 May 2019. Source: East Region SJFA
Legend: Blue = home team win; Yellow = draw; Red = away team win.
