= Paul McLean (footballer, born 1990) =

Scottish footballer

Personal information
- Date of birth: 2 February 1990 (age 36)
- Place of birth: Musselburgh, Scotland
- Height: 1.80 m (5 ft 11 in)
- Position: Defender

Team information
- Current team: Cowdenbeath (Player/Manager)

Youth career
- 2006–2008: Norwich City
- 2008–2009: Falkirk

Senior career*
Years	Team	Apps	(Gls)
2009–2019	Brechin City	289	(21)
2019–2024	Stirling Albion	103	(9)
2024–	Cowdenbeath	14	(2)
- * Club domestic league appearances and goals as of 21 December 2024

Paul McLean (born 2 February 1990) is a Scottish professional footballer who plays as a defender for Lowland League East club Cowdenbeath as a player/coach. McLean previously played with Brechin City, where he spent 10 years and also captained the side and was at Stirling Albion.

== Career ==
McLean started his career as a youth player with Norwich City F.C. Under-23s and Academy, after a successful trial in 2005 saw him being offered a contract for the 2006–07 season. He spent two years in England, before subsequently moving back to Scotland with Falkirk in 2007. His first contract as a senior footballer came when, at the age of 19, he was signed by Jim Duffy for Brechin City on a two-year deal.

After 10 years at Brechin, McLean left the club in May 2019 and signed for Stirling Albion.

In May 2024 he joined Cowdenbeath as a player-coach after four seasons with the binos'.

In March 2025. Paul Mclean officially retired after ripping his tights. Paul is now planning a career in athletics coaching up and coming sprinters.

== Career statistics ==
As of match played 20 July 2021

Appearances and goals by club, season and competition
Club	Season	League			Scottish Cup		League Cup		Other		Total	
Club	Season	Division	Apps	Goals	Apps	Goals	Apps	Goals	Apps	Goals	Apps	Goals
Brechin City	2009–10	Scottish Second Division	33	3	1	0	1	0	5 (Note: One appearance in the Scottish Challenge Cup and four in the First Division play-offs)	0	40	3
Brechin City	2010–11	Scottish Second Division	27	1	4	0	1	0	2 (Note: Appearances in the First Division play-offs)	0	34	1
Brechin City	2011–12	Scottish Second Division	30	1	1	0	0	0	1 (Note: Appearances in the Scottish Challenge Cup)	0	32	1
Brechin City	2012–13	Scottish Second Division	33	3	1	0	1	0	2 (Note: One appearance in the Scottish Challenge Cup and one in the First Division play-offs)	0	37	3
Brechin City	2013–14	Scottish League One	29	3	2	0	1	0	1	0	33	3
Brechin City	2014–15	Scottish League One	33	7	4	0	1	0	4 (Note: Two appearances in the Scottish Challenge Cup and two in the Championship play-offs)	0	42	7
Brechin City	2015–16	Scottish League One	29	1	1	0	1	0	1	0	32	1
Brechin City	2016–17	Scottish League One	29	2	0	0	0	0	6 (Note: Two appearances in the Scottish Challenge Cup; four appearances and a goal in the Championship play-offs)	1	35	3
Brechin City	2017–18	Scottish Championship	27	2	0	0	3	0	1	1	33	1
Brechin City	2018–19	Scottish League One	19	0	0	0	4	0	0	0	23	0
Brechin City	Total		289	23	14	0	13	0	23	2	341	23
Stirling Albion	2019–20	Scottish League Two	27	1	2	0	3	0	2	0	34	1
Stirling Albion	2020–21	Scottish League Two	7	0	0	0	2	0	0	0	9	0
Stirling Albion	2021–22	Scottish League Two	0	0	0	0	3	0	0	0	3	0
Stirling Albion	Total		34	1	2	0	8	0	2	0	46	1
Career total			323	24	16	0	21	0	25	2	387	24

== Personal life ==
Outside of football, McLean works in medical research at Edinburgh Royal Infirmary.
