= Andy Jackson (footballer, born 1988) =

Scottish footballer

Personal information
- Full name: Andrew Steven Jackson
- Date of birth: 9 January 1988 (age 38)
- Place of birth: Falkirk, Scotland
- Position: Striker

Senior career*
| Years | Team | Apps | (Gls) |
| 2004–2011 | St Johnstone | 74 | (15) |
| 2005 | → Cowdenbeath (loan) | 13 | (4) |
| 2006 | → Forfar Athletic (loan) | 13 | (5) |
| 2010 | → Arbroath (loan) | 8 | (0) |
| 2011–2012 | Greenock Morton | 29 | (5) |
| 2012–2019 | Brechin City | 211 | (68) |
| 2019–2020 | Forfar Athletic | 12 | (1) |
| 2020 | → Brechin City (loan) | 7 | (0) |
| 2020 | Brechin City | 0 | (0) |

International career^{‡}
- Republic of Ireland U17
- Republic of Ireland U18
| 2008 | Republic of Ireland U21 | 1 | (0) |
- * Club domestic league appearances and goals as of 20:59, 31 August 2020 (UTC) ‡ National team caps and goals as of 30 November 2008

Andrew Steven Jackson (born 9 January 1988) is a Scottish-born Irish footballer who plays as a striker. Beginning his career with St Johnstone, Jackson has also played for Greenock Morton, Brechin City and Forfar Athletic, and has also had spells on loan with Cowdenbeath, Forfar Athletic, Arbroath and Brechin City.

== Career ==
=== Club ===
Jackson started his career with St Johnstone. He made his league debut on 14 August 2004, in a 3–1 defeat against Queen of the South at McDiarmid Park. During the 2005–06 season, Jackson was loaned out to Cowdenbeath, with whom he scored four goals in thirteen league appearances, and Forfar Athletic, scoring five goals in thirteen appearances.

Jackson scored his first senior goal for St Johnstone on 5 September 2007 in their 2–0 victory over Ross County in the Scottish Challenge Cup. Jackson was awarded the Young Player of the Month for January 2008 after scoring in three consecutive games (against Raith Rovers, Dunfermline Athletic and Stirling Albion). Jackson missed most of the 2008–09 season with an Achilles tendon injury as St Johnstone won the First Division. In July 2009 he was taken to hospital suffering from a bowel complaint that had first troubled him in April 2008, and also hindered his fitness in 2008–09.

Jackson was released by Saints in summer 2011, and played for Greenock Morton for one season before being released in May 2012. Shortly afterwards he signed a deal with Second Division side Brechin City. Jackson scored on his début for Brechin, in a Challenge Cup tie against Third Division side Rangers. On 15 April 2014, Jackson signed a new one-year contract at Brechin.

After seven years with Brechin, Jackson signed a two-year deal with Angus rivals Forfar Athletic in May 2019, having previously had a spell on loan with the side in 2006. Jackson made 18 appearances for Forfar, before returning on loan to Brechin in January 2020. Although signing a deal to see him return to the club permanently, he ultimately left the club in August 2020 due to work commitments.

=== International ===
He has represented the Republic of Ireland at under-18, under-19 and under-21 level. He made his under-21 début against Austria on 19 August 2008, playing for 63 minutes in a 1–1 draw.

== Career statistics ==
As of 31 August 2020

Appearances and goals by club, season and competition
| Club | Season | League | | | Scottish Cup | | League Cup | | Other | | Total | |
| Club | Season | Division | Apps | Goals | Apps | Goals | Apps | Goals | Apps | Goals | Apps | Goals |
|---|---|---|---|---|---|---|---|---|---|---|---|---|
| St Johnstone | 2004–05 | Scottish First Division | 4 | 0 | 0 | 0 | 0 | 0 | 0 | 0 | 4 | 0 |
| St Johnstone | 2005–06 | Scottish First Division | 2 | 0 | 1 | 0 | 0 | 0 | 0 | 0 | 3 | 0 |
| St Johnstone | 2006–07 | Scottish First Division | 6 | 0 | 4 | 0 | 3 | 0 | 1 (Note: Appearances in the Scottish Challenge Cup) | 0 | 14 | 0 |
| St Johnstone | 2007–08 | Scottish First Division | 34 | 14 | 5 | 2 | 1 | 0 | 4 | 2 | 44 | 18 |
| St Johnstone | 2008–09 | Scottish First Division | 9 | 0 | 1 | 0 | 2 | 0 | 0 | 0 | 12 | 0 |
| St Johnstone | 2009–10 | Scottish Premier League | 2 | 0 | 0 | 0 | 0 | 0 | — | | 2 | 0 |
| St Johnstone | 2010–11 | Scottish Premier League | 17 | 1 | 0 | 0 | 1 | 0 | — | | 18 | 1 |
| St Johnstone | Total | | 74 | 15 | 11 | 2 | 7 | 0 | 5 | 2 | 97 | 19 |
| Cowdenbeath (loan) | 2005–06 | Scottish Third Division | 13 | 4 | 0 | 0 | 0 | 0 | 0 | 0 | 13 | 4 |
| Forfar Athletic (loan) | 2005–06 | Scottish Second Division | 13 | 5 | — | | 0 | 0 | 0 | 0 | 13 | 5 |
| Arbroath (loan) | 2009–10 | Scottish Second Division | 8 | 0 | 0 | 0 | 0 | 0 | 0 | 0 | 8 | 0 |
| Greenock Morton | 2011–12 | Scottish First Division | 29 | 5 | 1 | 0 | 2 | 2 | 1 | 4 | 33 | 11 |
| Brechin City | 2012–13 | Scottish Second Division | 35 | 16 | 1 | 0 | 1 | 0 | 3 (Note: One appearance and a goal in the Scottish Challenge Cup; two appearances and two goals in the First Division play-offs) | 3 | 40 | 19 |
| Brechin City | 2013–14 | Scottish League One | 33 | 12 | 3 | 2 | 1 | 0 | 1 | 0 | 38 | 14 |
| Brechin City | 2014–15 | Scottish League One | 34 | 11 | 4 | 3 | 1 | 0 | 4 (Note: Two appearances in the Scottish Challenge Cup and two in the Championship play-offs) | 0 | 43 | 14 |
| Brechin City | 2015–16 | Scottish League One | 34 | 5 | 1 | 1 | 1 | 0 | 1 | 0 | 37 | 6 |
| Brechin City | 2016–17 | Scottish League One | 29 | 13 | 0 | 0 | 4 | 1 | 5 (Note: One appearance and two goals in the Scottish Challenge Cup; four appearances in the Championship play-offs) | 2 | 38 | 16 |
| Brechin City | 2017–18 | Scottish Championship | 10 | 0 | 1 | 0 | 4 | 0 | 1 | 0 | 16 | 0 |
| Brechin City | 2018–19 | Scottish League One | 33 | 10 | 1 | 0 | 1 | 0 | 1 | 0 | 36 | 10 |
| Brechin City | Total | | 208 | 67 | 11 | 6 | 13 | 1 | 16 | 5 | 248 | 79 |
| Forfar Athletic | 2019–20 | Scottish League One | 12 | 1 | 1 | 0 | 5 | 1 | 0 | 0 | 18 | 1 |
| Brechin City (loan) | 2019–20 | Scottish League Two | 7 | 0 | 0 | 0 | 0 | 0 | 0 | 0 | 7 | 0 |
| Brechin City | 2010–21 | Scottish League Two | 0 | 0 | 0 | 0 | 0 | 0 | 0 | 0 | 0 | 0 |
| Career total | | | 324 | 87 | 24 | 8 | 27 | 4 | 22 | 11 | 437 | 119 |

== Honours ==
St Johnstone

- Scottish Challenge Cup: 2007–08
