= Ryan Stewart (footballer, born 1993) =

Scottish footballer (born 1993)

Personal information
- Date of birth: 6 October 1993 (age 33)
- Place of birth: Scotland
- Position: Midfielder

Youth career
- Hearts

Senior career*
| Years | Team | Apps | (Gls) |
| 2012–2013 | Brechin | 23 | (0) |
| 2013–2014 | East Fife | 18 | (1) |
| 2015–2020 | Fauldhouse United | | |
| 2020– | Cambuslang Rangers | | |
- * Club domestic league appearances and goals

Ryan Stewart (born 6 October 1993) is a Scottish professional footballer who plays as a midfielder who plays for Cambuslang Rangers.

== Club career ==
Stewart began his career in the youth academy of Hearts, but left the club in 2012 without making a single first team appearance. After leaving the Jambos, he signed for Brechin. He had 23 appearances with the Hedgemen before leaving the club in 2013.

After leaving Glebe Park, he signed for East Fife in 2013. He turned out 18 times in the league for the Fifers before leaving the club in 2014.

The midfielder signed for Fauldhouse United in 2015 and spent 5 seasons with the Hoose. Stewart signed for Cambuslang Rangers in 2020.
