= David McKenna (footballer) =

Scottish footballer (born 1986)

Personal information
- Full name: David Leslie McKenna
- Date of birth: 19 September 1986 (age 40)
- Place of birth: Paisley, Scotland
- Position: Striker

Team information
- Current team: Renfrew

Senior career*
Years	Team	Apps	(Gls)
2003–2007	St Mirren	28	(2)
2006	→ Cowdenbeath (loan)	17	(13)
2007–2010	Stirling Albion	103	(33)
2010–2013	Brechin City	101	(24)
2013–2014	Stranraer	35	(8)
2014–2016	East Stirlingshire	67	(23)
2016–2017	Annan Athletic	33	(13)
2017–2018	Beith Juniors		
2018–	Renfrew		
- * Club domestic league appearances and goals as of 11:45, 6 June 2017 (UTC)

David Leslie McKenna (born 19 September 1986) is a Scottish footballer, who plays for Renfrew FC as a striker. He has also played for St Mirren, Cowdenbeath, Stirling Albion, Brechin City, Stranraer, East Stirlingshire and Annan Athletic.

== Career ==
Born in Paisley, McKenna started his career at St Mirren. On 7 January 2006 he joined Cowdenbeath on loan, scoring 11 goals in a half season spell which saw him play a large role in the Blue Brazil winning their first league title in 67 years. Oddly enough he received another league championship medal that season from St Mirren who won the First Division. In June 2007, McKenna moved to Stirling Albion. During his time at Stirling he was part of the squad that won the 2009–10 Scottish Second Division.

After playing over 100 games for Stirling, he then moved to Brechin City at the end of the 2009–10 season. During three seasons at Brechin, he once again went on to play over 100 games for the club. In 2013, he was released by Brechin City and signed for Stranraer ahead of the 2013–14 season.

Mckenna joined East Stirlingshire in 2014 where he spent two seasons, before signing for Annan Athletic in June 2016. After one season with Annan, McKenna signed for Scottish Juniors club Beith Juniors.

On 12 January 2018, McKenna join Renfrew on a season loan until 11 February 2018.

== Career statistics ==
As of 27 November 2013

Club	Season	League		Cup		League Cup		Other^{[A]}		Total	
Club	Season	Apps	Goals	Apps	Goals	Apps	Goals	Apps	Goals	Apps	Goals
St Mirren	2002–03	4	1	0	0	0	0	0	0	4	1
St Mirren	2003–04	9	0	1	1	0	0	0	0	10	1
St Mirren	2004–05	3	0	0	0	0	0	0	0	3	0
St Mirren	2005–06	2	0	0	0	0	0	0	0	2	0
St Mirren	2006–07	10	0	0	0	0	0	0	0	10	0
St Mirren	Total	28	1	1	1	0	0	0	0	29	2
Cowdenbeath (loan)	2005–06	17	11	0	0	0	0	0	0	17	11
Cowdenbeath (loan)	Total	17	11	0	0	0	0	0	0	17	11
Stirling Albion	2007–08	35	7	2	1	2	1	1	0	40	9
Stirling Albion	2008–09	34	12	1	0	1	0	1	0	37	12
Stirling Albion	2009–10	34	7	4	0	1	0	3	2	42	9
Stirling Albion	Total	103	26	7	1	4	1	5	2	119	30
Brechin City	2010–11	34	10	6	4	3	0	4	0	47	14
Brechin City	2011–12	34	4	2	0	1	1	1	1	38	6
Brechin City	2012–13	33	7	2	0	1	0	3	0	39	7
Brechin City	Total	101	21	10	4	5	1	8	1	124	27
Stranraer	2013–14	14	1	2	0	3	1	2	0	21	2
Stranraer	Total	13	1	2	0	3	1	2	0	20	2
Career Total		263	60	20	6	12	3	15	3	310	72

A. Other includes Scottish Football League play-offs & Scottish Challenge Cup.

Totals include:

- St Mirren: 2 League appearances in 2003–04 where Soccerbase haven't recorded substitutions.
- Stirling Albion: 1 Challenge Cup appearance in 2008–09, 1 Challenge Cup appearance & 1 Scottish Cup appearance in 2009–10 where Soccerbase haven't recorded line-ups.
- Brechin City: 1 League Cup game in 2010–11 & 2 Scottish Cup games in 2010–11, 1 in 2011–12 & 1 in 2012–13 where Soccerbase haven't recorded line-ups.
- Stranraer: 1 Challenge Cup game in 2013–14 where Soccerbase haven't included line-ups.
