= Jonathan Brown (Scottish footballer) =

Footballer (born 1990)

Personal information
- Full name: Jonathan Brown
- Date of birth: 24 April 1990 (age 36)
- Place of birth: Kempton Park, South Africa
- Height: 1.82 m (6 ft 0 in)
- Position: Left-back

Team information
- Current team: Edinburgh United

Youth career
- –2004: Lothian Thistle Hutchison Vale
- 2004–2008: Heart of Midlothian

Senior career*
Years	Team	Apps	(Gls)
2008–2011	Heart of Midlothian	0	(0)
2009–2010	→ Livingston (loan)	16	(1)
2010–2011	→ Stirling Albion (loan)	18	(0)
2011–2012	Livingston	9	(0)
2012–2014	Brechin City	48	(6)
2014–2021	Bonnyrigg Rose Athletic	97	(15)
2021–2022	→ Dundonald Bluebell (loan)		
2022	Dundonald Bluebell		
2022–	Edinburgh United		

International career^{‡}
- Scotland U16
2007	Scotland U18	3	(0)
2007–2009	Scotland U19	8	(0)
- * Club domestic league appearances and goals ‡ National team caps and goals as of 1 June 2009

Jonathan Brown (born 24 April 1990) is a professional footballer. He has previously played for Heart of Midlothian, Livingston, Stirling Albion, and Brechin City. Born in South Africa, he has represented Scotland internationally at youth level.

== Club career ==
Having come through the youth team ranks at Heart of Midlothian, Brown joined Livingston on a season-long loan in August 2009 and whilst at the club scored his first Scottish League goal in January 2010 against Elgin City. He ended the season with a Third Division Championship medal.

The following season, he joined Stirling Albion, again for a season-long loan, but this time at First Division level. The season finished disappointingly with relegation as the club finished bottom of the table.

On 8 July 2011, Brown left Hearts and joined Livingston on a one-year deal after releasing himself from his contract.

In July 2012 Brown joined Brechin City. He was released by Brechin on 6 May 2014.

In June 2014, Brown signed for Junior club Bonnyrigg Rose.

Brown announced his retirement from football on 24 April 2021 after missing most of the 2020–21 season through injury. Brown came out of retirement in December 2021. He was loaned to Dundonald Bluebell for a few weeks to pick up his fitness. He was still under contract with Rose during his retirement.

The defender signed for Edinburgh United in 2022.

== International career ==
Brown has represented Scotland at under-16, under-18 and under-19 levels. He was last capped at under-19 international level, playing in the 2009 UEFA European Under-19 Football Championship elite qualification. He is also eligible to represent South Africa at international level.
