= Rory McAllister (footballer) =

Scottish footballer (born 1987)

Personal information
- Date of birth: 13 May 1987 (age 39)
- Place of birth: Aberdeen, Scotland
- Position: Striker

Team information
- Current team: Formartine United

Youth career
- Middlefield Wasps
- Aberdeen

Senior career*
| Years | Team | Apps | (Gls) |
| 2005–2009 | Inverness Caledonian Thistle | 47 | (3) |
| 2008 | → Peterhead (loan) | 4 | (1) |
| 2009–2011 | Brechin City | 63 | (40) |
| 2011–2020 | Peterhead | 281 | (158) |
| 2020–2022 | Cove Rangers | 60 | (24) |
| 2022–2023 | Montrose | 37 | (10) |
| 2023–2025 | Peterhead | 53 | (12) |
| 2025– | Formartine United | 26 | (17) |

International career
| 2007 | Scotland U20 | 2 | (1) |
| 2007–2008 | Scotland U21 | 3 | (0) |
- * Club domestic league appearances and goals as of 03:14, 31 May 2025 (UTC)

Rory McAllister (born 13 May 1987 in Aberdeen) is a Scottish professional footballer who plays for Highland League club Formartine United.

== Club career ==
=== Inverness Caledonian Thistle ===
McAllister played with local club Middlefield Wasps "from about eight to 14 or 15". He then went on trial with a number of clubs in Scotland and England before signing for Aberdeen.

After being released by Aberdeen, McAllister signed for Inverness Caledonian Thistle. In three seasons he played in over 50 games, and scored five goals. He made his league début for Inverness on 30 April 2005, as a second-half substitute against Kilmarnock. His first goal came in a Scottish Cup tie against Ayr United on 7 January 2006.

After failing to build upon his early potential, first team appearances at Inverness became scarce. He was loaned out to Second Division club Peterhead in January 2008. He played four times for the club and scored one goal, in a 9–2 victory against Berwick Rangers.

In April 2008, McAllister signed a new one-year contract with Inverness, however on 24 January 2009, he left the club by mutual consent.

=== Brechin City ===
After leaving Inverness, McAllister then signed for Brechin City, scoring a total of 29 goals in his first full season as Brechin lost out in the First Division promotion play-off final against Cowdenbeath. During the 2010–11 season McAllister scored four times in an away match against his old club Peterhead.

In both the 2009–10 and 2010–11 seasons, McAllister was voted PFA Scotland Second Division Player of the Year.

McAllister's goalscoring exploits at Brechin did not go unnoticed, with Aberdeen, St Johnstone, Peterhead, Charlton Athletic, Port Vale and Sheffield United rumoured to be keen on him. On 16 June 2011, he turned down a move to SPL club St Mirren.

=== Peterhead ===
Having initially said he wanted to return to full-time football, McAllister then dropped down to the Third Division to join relegated Peterhead to be closer to Aberdeen to get an apprenticeship in plumbing, in order to have a career to fall back on when he retired from football. On 20 April 2013, he scored the winning goal as Peterhead won 2–1 against Rangers at Ibrox. On 8 April 2014, McAllister was awarded the SPFL Player of the month for March 2014, after scoring eight goals in six games during the month, becoming the first player from outside the Scottish Premiership to win the award.

On 12 April 2014, McAllister scored Peterhead's second goal in a 2–0 win against Clyde, a result which meant the club won the Scottish League Two title and promotion to League One. On 27 April 2014, McAllister was named as PFA Scotland League Two Player of the Year for 2013–14. He signed a new contract on 11 August 2014, keeping him at Peterhead until 2017.

In an interview in 2015, McAllister said he could not see himself leaving Peterhead for the rest of his career. On 18 August 2015, he scored all five of his side's goals in a 2015–16 Scottish Challenge Cup match against Falkirk. Peterhead went all the way to the final at Hampden Park, losing 4–0 to Rangers.

In August 2016, McAllister signed a new two-year deal with Peterhead to run to the end of the 2017–18 season after rejecting the opportunity to join Dundee United.

McAllister scored five goals in a match again in October 2017, this time against more modest opposition, in a 9–0 victory over amateurs Colville Park in the 2017–18 Scottish Cup. By January 2018 he had 24 goals in 24 matches during the season, making him the nation's leading scorer alongside Alan Trouten of Albion Rovers.

After scoring against Albion Rovers in August 2018, McAllister became the first player to reach 100 goals since the SPFL began operation in 2013.

=== Cove Rangers ===
In January 2020, after handing in a transfer request to Peterhead, McAllister moved to League Two side Cove Rangers on a three-and-a-half-year deal for an undisclosed fee.

=== Montrose ===
After planning a family holiday around his work, McAllister was placed on Cove Rangers' transfer list by new manager Jim McIntyre. Despite offering to fly back to Scotland for training and the remaining game of their League Cup group stage campaign, this wasn't enough to keep McAllister at the club. Days later, he signed a two-year deal with Montrose.

McAllister made his debut for Montrose on the opening day of the League One season, a goalless draw away to Falkirk, and scored his first goal three games later, the opening goal in a 2–1 victory over Clyde.

== International career ==
McAllister was capped by the Scottish national under-20 team in May 2007, in preparation for the 2007 FIFA U-20 World Cup, scoring once in 2007 against Northern Ireland under-21. He was also capped at under-21 level.

== Personal life ==
McAllister combined his playing career with a job as a plumber.

== Career statistics ==
As of match played 2 January 2022

Appearances and goals by club, season and competition
| Club | Season | League | | | Scottish Cup | | League Cup | | Other | | Total | |
| Club | Season | Division | Apps | Goals | Apps | Goals | Apps | Goals | Apps | Goals | Apps | Goals |
|---|---|---|---|---|---|---|---|---|---|---|---|---|
| Inverness Caledonian Thistle | 2004–05 | Scottish Premier League | 4 | 0 | 0 | 0 | 0 | 0 | – | | 4 | 0 |
| Inverness Caledonian Thistle | 2005–06 | Scottish Premier League | 13 | 0 | 2 | 1 | 3 | 0 | – | | 18 | 1 |
| Inverness Caledonian Thistle | 2006–07 | Scottish Premier League | 19 | 2 | 3 | 0 | 2 | 1 | – | | 24 | 3 |
| Inverness Caledonian Thistle | 2007–08 | Scottish Premier League | 10 | 1 | 0 | 0 | 1 | 0 | – | | 11 | 1 |
| Inverness Caledonian Thistle | 2008–09 | Scottish Premier League | 3 | 0 | 0 | 0 | 2 | 0 | – | | 5 | 0 |
| Inverness Caledonian Thistle | Total | | 49 | 3 | 5 | 1 | 8 | 1 | 0 | 0 | 62 | 5 |
| Peterhead (loan) | 2007–08 | Scottish Second Division | 4 | 1 | 0 | 0 | 0 | 0 | 0 | 0 | 4 | 1 |
| Brechin City | 2009–10 | Scottish Second Division | 34 | 21 | 1 | 0 | 1 | 2 | 5 (Note: One appearance and a goal in the Scottish Challenge Cup; four appearances and two goals in the First Division play-offs) | 3 | 41 | 26 |
| Brechin City | 2010–11 | Scottish Second Division | 29 | 19 | 4 | 4 | 2 | 2 | 4 (Note: Appearances in the First Division play-offs) | 0 | 39 | 25 |
| Brechin City | Total | | 63 | 40 | 5 | 4 | 3 | 4 | 9 | 3 | 80 | 51 |
| Peterhead | 2011–12 | Scottish Third Division | 34 | 21 | 1 | 0 | 1 | 0 | 1 (Note: Appearances in the Scottish Challenge Cup) | 1 | 37 | 22 |
| Peterhead | 2012–13 | Scottish Third Division | 34 | 21 | 0 | 0 | 1 | 0 | 5 (Note: One appearance and a goal in the Scottish Challenge Cup; four appearances and a goal in the Second Division play-offs) | 2 | 40 | 23 |
| Peterhead | 2013–14 | Scottish League Two | 32 | 32 | 1 | 1 | 1 | 0 | 1 | 0 | 35 | 33 |
| Peterhead | 2014–15 | Scottish League One | 31 | 8 | 1 | 0 | 1 | 0 | 3 | 1 | 36 | 9 |
| Peterhead | 2015–16 | Scottish League One | 33 | 22 | 1 | 1 | 1 | 0 | 6 (Note: Five appearances and eight goals in the Scottish Challenge Cup; one appearance in the Championship play-offs) | 8 | 41 | 31 |
| Peterhead | 2016–17 | Scottish League One | 33 | 16 | 1 | 0 | 5 | 4 | 5 (Note: Two appearances and three goals in the Scottish Challenge Cup; three appearances and three goals in the League One play-offs) | 6 | 44 | 26 |
| Peterhead | 2017–18 | Scottish League Two | 31 | 20 | 3 | 7 | 4 | 3 | 6 | 2 | 44 | 32 |
| Peterhead | 2018–19 | Scottish League Two | 35 | 15 | 3 | 1 | 4 | 0 | 2 | 0 | 44 | 16 |
| Peterhead | 2019–20 | Scottish League One | 18 | 3 | 1 | 0 | 3 | 1 | 1 | 0 | 23 | 4 |
| Peterhead | Total | | 281 | 158 | 12 | 10 | 21 | 8 | 30 | 20 | 344 | 196 |
| Cove Rangers | 2019–20 | Scottish League Two | 8 | 3 | 0 | 0 | 0 | 0 | 0 | 0 | 8 | 3 |
| Cove Rangers | 2020–21 | Scottish League One | 20 | 5 | 2 | 1 | 3 | 2 | 2 (Note: Appearances in the Championship play-offs) | 1 | 27 | 9 |
| Cove Rangers | 2021–22 | Scottish League One | 32 | 16 | 3 | 1 | 4 | 0 | 3 | 2 | 42 | 19 |
| Cove Rangers | Total | | 60 | 24 | 5 | 2 | 7 | 2 | 5 | 3 | 77 | 31 |
| Montrose | 2022–23 | Scottish League One | 29 | 8 | 1 | 0 | 3 | 0 | 2 | 0 | 35 | 8 |
| Career total | | | 486 | 234 | 28 | 17 | 42 | 15 | 46 | 26 | 602 | 292 |
