= 2009–10 Scottish First Division =

Irn-Bru Scottish First Division
- Season: 2009–10
- Champions: Inverness Caledonian Thistle
- Promoted: Inverness Caledonian Thistle
- Relegated: Airdrie United, Ayr United
- Top goalscorer: Adam Rooney (24)
- Biggest home win: Morton 5–0 Raith Rovers; Partick Thistle 5–0 Morton
- Biggest away win: Ayr United 0–7 Inverness CT
- Highest scoring: Ross County 5–3 Airdrie United
- Highest attendance: 6,289: Dunfermline Athletic 0-2 Raith Rovers (29/08/09)
- Lowest attendance: 703: Airdrie United 1-1 Dunfermline Athletic (09/03/10)

The 2009–10 Scottish First Division was the 16th season of the First Division in its current format of ten teams.

== Club locations ==
Location of teams in 2009–10 Scottish First Division

== Promotion and relegation from 2008–09 ==
=== SPL & First Division ===
Relegated from Premier League to First Division

- Inverness Caledonian Thistle

Promoted from First Division to Scottish Premier League

- St Johnstone

=== First & Second Divisions ===
Relegated from First Division to Second Division

- Clyde

Relegated from First Division to Third Division

- Livingston

Promoted from Second Division to First Division

- Raith Rovers
- Ayr United

== League table ==
| Pos | Team | Pld | W | D | L | GF | GA | GD | Pts | Promotion, qualification or relegation |
|---|---|---|---|---|---|---|---|---|---|---|
| 1 | Inverness Caledonian Thistle (C, P) | 36 | 21 | 10 | 5 | 72 | 32 | +40 | 73 | Promotion to the Premier League |
| 2 | Dundee | 36 | 16 | 13 | 7 | 48 | 34 | +14 | 61 | |
| 3 | Dunfermline Athletic | 36 | 17 | 7 | 12 | 54 | 44 | +10 | 58 | |
| 4 | Queen of the South | 36 | 15 | 11 | 10 | 53 | 40 | +13 | 56 | |
| 5 | Ross County | 36 | 15 | 11 | 10 | 46 | 44 | +2 | 56 | |
| 6 | Partick Thistle | 36 | 14 | 6 | 16 | 43 | 40 | +3 | 48 | |
| 7 | Raith Rovers | 36 | 11 | 9 | 16 | 36 | 47 | −11 | 42 | |
| 8 | Greenock Morton | 36 | 11 | 4 | 21 | 40 | 65 | −25 | 37 | |
| 9 | Airdrie United (R) | 36 | 8 | 9 | 19 | 41 | 56 | −15 | 33 | Qualification to the First Division play-offs |
| 10 | Ayr United (R) | 36 | 7 | 10 | 19 | 29 | 60 | −31 | 31 | Relegation to the Second Division |

Source: Scottish Football League
Rules for classification: 1) points; 2) goal difference; 3) number of goals scored.
First Division play-offs: The 9th place team will be entered into a play-off with the 2nd, 3rd and 4th places of the Second Division. The winner gets a place in the 2010-11 First Division
(C) Champions; (P) Promoted; (R) Relegated

== Results ==
Teams play each other four times in this league. In the first half of the season each team plays every other team twice (home and away) and then does the same in the second half of the season.

=== First half of season ===
| Home \ Away | AIR | AYR | DND | DNF | GMO | INV | PAR | QOS | RAI | ROS |
|---|---|---|---|---|---|---|---|---|---|---|
| Airdrie United | | 3–1 | 1–1 | 1–1 | 2–4 | 1–1 | 2–5 | 1–1 | 1–2 | 0–1 |
| Ayr United | 1–1 | | 2–2 | 1–0 | 0–2 | 1–5 | 1–1 | 0–1 | 1–0 | 1–1 |
| Dundee | 2–1 | 3–1 | | 1–0 | 1–0 | 2–2 | 2–0 | 0–0 | 2–1 | 2–0 |
| Dunfermline Athletic | 2–0 | 3–1 | 1–1 | | 3–1 | 0–1 | 3–1 | 1–4 | 0–2 | 3–3 |
| Greenock Morton | 1–0 | 1–0 | 0–1 | 0–2 | | 0–3 | 0–2 | 1–2 | 5–0 | 0–1 |
| Inverness Caledonian Thistle | 2–0 | 0–0 | 1–1 | 1–1 | 4–1 | | 2–3 | 1–3 | 1–0 | 1–3 |
| Partick Thistle | 2–0 | 2–0 | 0–2 | 2–0 | 5–0 | 2–1 | | 2–2 | 1–2 | 0–0 |
| Queen of the South | 3–0 | 2–0 | 2–0 | 1–2 | 2–3 | 1–1 | 1–0 | | 1–1 | 2–0 |
| Raith Rovers | 1–1 | 0–0 | 2–2 | 1–2 | 3–0 | 0–1 | 1–1 | 1–0 | | 2–1 |
| Ross County | 2–1 | 2–1 | 0–1 | 0–0 | 3–1 | 2–1 | 2–2 | 3–2 | 0–1 | |

Updated to match(es) played on 31 March 2009. Source: Scottish Football League
Legend: Blue = home team win; Yellow = draw; Red = away team win.

=== Second half of season ===
| Home \ Away | AIR | AYR | DND | DNF | GMO | INV | PAR | QOS | RAI | ROS |
|---|---|---|---|---|---|---|---|---|---|---|
| Airdrie United | | 1–1 | 3–0 | 0–1 | 3–0 | 0–1 | 2–0 | 0–1 | 3–0 | 1–1 |
| Ayr United | 1–4 | | 1–1 | 1–2 | 2–0 | 0–7 | 1–0 | 3–0 | 0–2 | 0–1 |
| Dundee | 0–1 | 3–0 | | 3–2 | 3–1 | 2–2 | 1–0 | 1–1 | 2–0 | 0–1 |
| Dunfermline Athletic | 2–0 | 0–1 | 2–1 | | 4–1 | 0–0 | 1–2 | 3–1 | 2–1 | 1–2 |
| Greenock Morton | 2–1 | 2–1 | 2–2 | 1–2 | | 0–2 | 1–0 | 3–3 | 1–1 | 1–1 |
| Inverness Caledonian Thistle | 4–0 | 3–3 | 1–0 | 2–0 | 1–0 | | 2–1 | 3–1 | 4–3 | 3–0 |
| Partick Thistle | 2–0 | 0–1 | 0–1 | 1–4 | 1–0 | 0–1 | | 1–0 | 0–0 | 2–1 |
| Queen of the South | 2–2 | 3–0 | 1–1 | 2–0 | 1–2 | 1–3 | 1–0 | | 3–0 | 1–0 |
| Raith Rovers | 0–1 | 1–1 | 1–0 | 1–2 | 1–2 | 0–4 | 1–0 | 0–0 | | 4–1 |
| Ross County | 5–3 | 1–0 | 1–1 | 2–2 | 2–1 | 0–0 | 1–2 | 1–1 | 1–0 | |

Updated to match(es) played on 1 May 2010. Source: Scottish Football League
Legend: Blue = home team win; Yellow = draw; Red = away team win.

== Top scorers ==
As of 15 April 2010
Sources: BBC

| Rank | Scorer | Team | Goals |
|---|---|---|---|
| 1 | (Republic of Ireland) Adam Rooney | Inverness CT | 24 |
| 2 | (Scotland) Gary Harkins | Dundee | 15 |
| 3 | (Republic of Ireland) Richie Foran | Inverness CT | 12 |
| 3 | (Scotland) Leigh Griffiths | Dundee | 12 |
| 5 | (Scotland) John Baird | Airdrie United | 11 |
| 6 | (Scotland) Liam Buchanan | Partick Thistle | 10 |
| 6 | (Scotland) Derek Holmes | Queen of the South | 10 |
| 6 | (England) Peter Weatherson | Greenock Morton | 10 |
| 9 | (Scotland) Willie Gibson | Dunfermline Athletic | 10 |
| 9 | (Republic of Ireland) Jonny Hayes | Inverness CT | 10 |

== First Division play-offs ==
Times are BST (UTC+1)

=== Semi-finals ===
The ninth placed team in the First Division played the fourth placed team in the Second Division and third placed team in the Second Division played the second placed team in the Second Division. The play-offs were played over two legs, the winning team in each semi-final advanced to the final.

| Team 1 | Agg. | Team 2 | 1st leg | 2nd leg |
|---|---|---|---|---|
| Brechin City | 3–1 | Airdrie United | 2–1 | 1–0 |
| Cowdenbeath | 3–1 | Alloa Athletic | 1–1 | 2–0 |

First legs

5 May 2010
7:45pm

| Brechin City | 2–1 | Airdrie United |
|---|---|---|
| McAllister 10'; King 44' (pen) | BBC Sport | Gemmill 15' |

Glebe Park, Brechin
Attendance: 583

5 May 2010
7:45pm

| Cowdenbeath | 1–1 | Alloa Athletic |
|---|---|---|
| Dempster 90+3' | BBC Sport | Gormley 16' |

Central Park, Cowdenbeath
Attendance: 578

Second legs

8 May 2010
3:00pm

| Airdrie United | 0–1 | Brechin City |
|---|---|---|
| | BBC Sport | McAllister 61' |

Excelsior Stadium
Attendance: 1156

8 May 2010
3:00pm

| Alloa Athletic | 0–2 | Cowdenbeath |
|---|---|---|
| | BBC Sport | Wardlaw 59'; McQuade 82' |

Recreation Park, Alloa
Attendance: 1234

=== Final ===
The two semi-final winners played each other over two legs. The winning team was awarded a place in the 2010–11 First Division.

| Team 1 | Agg. | Team 2 | 1st leg | 2nd leg |
|---|---|---|---|---|
| Cowdenbeath | 3–0 | Brechin City | 0–0 | 3–0 |

First leg

12 May 2010
7:45pm

| Cowdenbeath | 0–0 | Brechin City |
|---|---|---|
| | BBC Sport |

Central Park, Cowdenbeath
Attendance: 1119

Second leg

16 May 2010
3:00pm

| Brechin City | 0–3 | Cowdenbeath |
|---|---|---|
| | BBC Sport | Mbu 17'; Wardlaw 25', 45+4' |

Glebe Park, Brechin
Attendance: 1627

== Kits and shirt sponsors ==
| Team | Kit manufacturer | Kit sponsor | Notes |
|---|---|---|---|
| Airdrie United | Surridge Sports | St Andrew's Hospice | New home and away kits. |
| Ayr United | Surridge Sports | Paligap | New home and away kits. |
| Dundee | Bukta | Viga Athletic Clothing (Home), Bukta (Away) | New home and away kits. |
| Dunfermline Athletic | Puma | The Purvis Group | New home and away kits. |
| Greenock Morton | Bukta | Millions Chews | New home kit. |
| Inverness Caledonian Thistle | Erreà | Flybe | New away kit. |
| Partick Thistle | Puma | Ignis asset management | New away kit. |
| Queen of the South | Surridge Sports | Peter C Haining Kitchens & Bathrooms | New home and away kits. |
| Raith Rovers | Puma | O'Connell's Bar and Diner | New home and away kits. |
| Ross County | Adidas | Highnet | New home kit. |

== Stadia ==
| Team | Stadium | Capacity |
|---|---|---|
| Airdrie United | Excelsior Stadium | 10,171 |
| Dunfermline Athletic | East End Park | 11,998 |
| Dundee | Dens Park | 11,856 |
| Inverness Caledonian Thistle | Caledonian Stadium | 7,711 |
| Greenock Morton | Cappielow Park | 11,612 |
| Partick Thistle | Firhill Stadium | 10,887 |
| Queen of the South | Palmerston Park | 6,412 |
| Ross County | Victoria Park | 6,310 |
| Ayr United | Somerset Park | 10,185 |
| Raith Rovers | Stark's Park | 10,104 |
