= Neil Janczyk =

Scottish footballer and coach

Personal information
- Full name: Neil Janczyk
- Date of birth: 07/04/1984
- Place of birth: Edinburgh, Scotland
- Position: Midfielder

Team information
- Current team: Easthouses Lily Miners Welfare

Youth career
- 1999–2002: Heart Of Midlothian

Senior career*
| Years | Team | Apps | (Gls) |
| 2002–2005 | Heart of Midlothian | 25 | (0) |
| 2003 | → Alloa Athletic (loan) | 12 | (2) |
| 2005–2007 | St Johnstone | 10 | (0) |
| 2006 | → Raith Rovers (loan) | 7 | (0) |
| 2007 | → Stranraer (loan) | 10 | (1) |
| 2007–2012 | Brechin City | 125 | (7) |
| 2012 | East Fife | 18 | (0) |
| 2012–2014 | Berwick Rangers | 40 | (1) |
| 2014 | Clyde | 12 | (0) |
| 2014–2017 | Penicuik Athletic | 57 | (6) |
| 2017 | Tranent Juniors | | |
| 2017–2018 | Bonnyrigg Rose | | |
| 2018–2019 | Dalkeith Thistle | | |
| 2019–2020 | Whitehill Welfare | | |
| 2020– | Easthouses Lily Miners Welfare | | |

Managerial career
- 2020: Whitehill Welfare
- * Club domestic league appearances and goals as of 00:00, 20 November 2020 (UTC)

Neil Janczyk (born 7 April 1983) is a Scottish professional footballer and coach who plays for Easthouses Lily Miners Welfare.

== Career ==
He spent his early career at Heart of Midlothian, but he could only manage a handful of appearances before being released. He is best remembered by Hearts fans for two assists in a 2–1 defeat of Edinburgh derby rivals Hibs in a match played at Easter Road on 3 November 2002.

Janczyk was released by Hearts in 2005 and he then signed for St Johnstone. He scored his first and only goal for St Johnstone in a Scottish Challenge Cup tie against Partick Thistle. He again failed to hold down a regular place, and St Johnstone loaned Janczyk out to Raith Rovers and then Stranraer (where he scored once against Morton). He was released by St Johnstone at the end of the 2006–07 season after two years with the club. Janczyk signed for Brechin City in July 2007 and moved to East Fife in January 2012. He then signed for Berwick Rangers in July 2012, scoring once against Queen's Park, before moving to Clyde on 27 January 2014 having already featured in two matches for them as a trialist.

On 5 June 2014, Janczyk signed for Penicuik Athletic after he was released by Clyde. Janczyk ended the season with six goals from thirty-six appearances, and having claimed the goal of the season award, for a strike against Glenrothes.

Janczyk signed with Tranent in 2017, however, moved to Bonnyrigg Rose, only a few months later, where he held a dual role as a player and assistant manager. Janczyk signed with Dalkeith Thistle in 2018 and Whitehill Welfare in 2019.

Janczyk was announced as Whitehill Welfare manager in April 2020. He resigned on 8 November 2020.

Janczyk signed with Easthouses Lily Miners Welfare as a player on 18 November 2020.
