= David Scott (footballer) =

Australian rules footballer

Personal information
- Full name: David Scott
- Born: 6 February 1955
- Original team: Koondrook
- Height: 180 cm (71 in)
- Weight: 82 kg (181 lb)

Playing career^{1}
Years	Club	Games (Goals)
1975	Geelong	1 (0)
- ^{1} Playing statistics correct to the end of 1975.

David Scott (born 6 February 1955) is a former Australian rules footballer who played with Geelong in the Victorian Football League (VFL).
