= David Crawford (footballer, born 1992) =

Scottish footballer

Personal information
- Date of birth: 18 May 1992 (age 34)
- Place of birth: Bellshill, Scotland
- Position: Winger

Youth career
- 2006–2011: Hibernian

Senior career*
Years	Team	Apps	(Gls)
2011–2012	Hibernian	2	(0)
2011	→ Ayr United (loan)		
2011	→ Brechin City (loan)	10	(0)
2012	Brechin City	10	(0)
2012–2014	Albion Rovers	53	(12)
- * Club domestic league appearances and goals as of 22:49, 12 July 2020 (UTC)

David Crawford (born 18 May 1992) is a Scottish former footballer. Crawford has previously played for Hibernian, Ayr United, Brechin City and Albion Rovers.

== Career ==
Crawford, who was born in Bellshill, joined Hibernian in 2006. During his progress through the Hibs youth system, Crawford received the rising star award voted upon by the coaches of the SPL under-19 teams in January 2011. This progress earned him a one-year professional contract with Hibs in March 2011.

Crawford was then loaned out to Second Division club Ayr United for the rest of the 2010–11 season. He was given the man of the match award for his performance in his full début for Ayr, a 3–1 win against Airdrie United. Crawford, along with his namesake David Crawford (a goalkeeper), helped Ayr win promotion to the First Division through the end of season play-offs.

He made his Hibs first team debut on 24 July 2011, coming on as a substitute in the 85th minute of the 2–0 defeat against Celtic at Easter Road. Manager Colin Calderwood praised Crawford after he contributed in a victory against Inverness CT. Crawford was then loaned out to Brechin City. He made 11 appearances for Brechin before returning to Hibs. Crawford was then released from his contract with Hibs by mutual consent.

Crawford then signed for Brechin City on a contract to the end of the 2011–12 season. The following season, he joined Albion Rovers.
