= 2005–06 Scottish Third Division =

Scottish Third Division
- Season: 2005–06
- Champions: Cowdenbeath
- Promoted: Cowdenbeath
- Relegated: n/a
- Matches: 180
- Goals: 518 (2.88 per match)
- Top goalscorer: Martin Johnston (20)
- Biggest home win: Cowdenbeath 6–0 Queen's Park (18 February 2006)
- Biggest away win: East Stirlingshire 0–7 Stenhousemuir (21 March 2006)
- Highest scoring: Arbroath 7–2 East Stirlingshire (26 November 2005)
- Longest winning run: 7 games Berwick Rangers
- Longest unbeaten run: 14 games Berwick Rangers
- Longest winless run: 11 games East Stirlingshire
- Longest losing run: 7 games East Fife

The 2005–06 Scottish Football League Third Division was the 12th season in the format of ten teams in the fourth-tier of Scottish football. The season started on 6 August 2005 and ended on 29 April 2006. Cowdenbeath finished top and were directly promoted to the 2006–07 Scottish Second Division.

The 2005–06 season saw the introduction of the play-offs in which the ninth placed team of the Scottish Second Division would enter and knock-out tournament with the teams ranked second, third and fourth in the Scottish Third Division. Berwick Rangers, Stenhousemuir and Arbroath entered the play-offs against Alloa Athletic of the Second Division, who emerged play-off winners and avoided relegation.

== Teams for 2005–06 ==
Location of teams in 2005–06 Scottish Third Division

Gretna as champions of the 2004–05 season were directly promoted to the 2005–06 Scottish Second Division alongside Peterhead who finished second. They were replaced by Berwick Rangers, who finished bottom of the 2004–05 Scottish Second Division, and Arbroath respectively.

=== Overview ===
Relegated from Second Division to Third Division

- Berwick Rangers
- Arbroath

Promoted from Third Division to Second Division

- Gretna
- Peterhead

== Stadia and attendances ==
Team	Stadium	Average
Arbroath	Gayfield Park	591
Albion Rovers	Cliftonhill	367
Berwick Rangers	Shielfield Park	472
Cowdenbeath	Central Park	471
East Fife	Bayview Stadium	475
East Stirlingshire	Firs Park	255
Elgin City	Borough Briggs	429
Montrose	Links Park	422
Queen's Park	Hampden Park	506
Stenhousemuir	Ochilview Park	475

== Table ==
Pos	Team	Pld	W	D	L	GF	GA	GD	Pts	Promotion or qualification
1	Cowdenbeath (C, P)	36	24	4	8	81	34	+47	76	Promotion to the Second Division
2	Berwick Rangers	36	23	7	6	54	27	+27	76	Qualification for the Second Division Play-offs (Note: The 2nd, 3rd and 4th placed teams will be entered into a play-off with the Second Division's 9th placed team. The winning team will be awarded a place in the 2006–07 Second Division, Alloa Athletic won the play-off to stay in the division.)
3	Stenhousemuir	36	23	4	9	78	38	+40	73	Qualification for the Second Division Play-offs
4	Arbroath	36	16	7	13	57	47	+10	55	Qualification for the Second Division Play-offs
5	Elgin City	36	15	7	14	55	58	−3	52	
6	Queen's Park	36	13	12	11	47	42	+5	51	
7	East Fife	36	13	4	19	48	64	−16	43	
8	Albion Rovers	36	7	8	21	39	60	−21	29	
9	Montrose	36	6	10	20	31	59	−28	28	
10	East Stirlingshire	36	6	5	25	28	89	−61	23	

Source: Soccerway
Rules for classification: 1) points; 2) goal difference; 3) number of goals scored.
(C) Champions; (P) Promoted

== Top scorers ==
Rank	Scorer	Goals	Team
1	(Scotland) Martin Johnston	20	Elgin City
2	(Scotland) Liam Buchanan	17	Cowdenbeath
3	(Scotland) Colin Cramb	16	Stenhousemuir
4	(Scotland) Paul McGrillen	15	Stenhousemuir
5	(Scotland) Kevin Haynes	13	Berwick Rangers
6	(Scotland) Greig Henslee	10	Montrose
7	(Scotland) Gareth Hutchison	9	Berwick Rangers
7	(Scotland) Iain Diack	9	Stenhousemuir/ East Stirlingshire
7	(Scotland) Jay Stein	9	Arbroath
7	(Scotland) Mark Booth	9	Elgin City
7	(Scotland) David McKenna	9	Cowdenbeath
