= Mark Archdeacon =

Scottish footballer

Personal information
- Full name: Mark Archdeacon
- Date of birth: 9 October 1989 (age 37)
- Place of birth: Greenock, Scotland
- Height: 6 ft 1 in (1.85 m)
- Position: Striker

Team information
- Current team: Neilston Juniors

Youth career
- Motherwell

Senior career*
Years	Team	Apps	(Gls)
2008–2010	Motherwell	0	(0)
2009	→ Albion Rovers (loan)	10	(0)
2010	→ Brechin City (loan)	9	(3)
2010–2011	Brechin City	9	(1)
2011–2012	Clyde	12	(1)
2012–2013	Kilbirnie Ladeside		
2013–2019	Dalry Thistle		
- * Club domestic league appearances and goals as of 21:39, 17 February 2014 (GMT)

Mark Archdeacon (born 9 October 1989) is a footballer who plays for Scottish Junior team Neilston Juniors. He previously played professionally for Motherwell. He is the son of former Celtic and Morton player Owen Archdeacon.

== Career ==
In January 2009, Archdeacon went on loan to Albion Rovers however injury restricted him from making any real impact, and only managed 3 starts and 7 substitute appearances, failing to score.

Archdeacon made his debut for Motherwell in a Europa League match against Llanelli on 9 July 2009, and this would be his only appearance for the Steelmen. He was once again loaned out, this time to Brechin City, and there he scored 3 goals in 9 starts as the Glebe Park outfit just missed out on promotion to Division One.

Archdeacon was freed by Motherwell as he did not feature in manager Craig Brown's plans.

Archdeacon was a trialist for Stirling Albion in 2010, being named as an unused substitute against Falkirk in a 3–0 defeat, before starting against the same opposition in the Stirlingshire Cup, a game in which he scored in a 2–1 defeat. He then played one game as a trialist for Stenhousemuir.

In early November, Archdeacon re-joined Brechin City, to help them in their promotion challenge. He scored in the 5–0 win away to Peterhead. He signed for Clyde in June 2011. Mark scored his debut goal for Clyde against former team Brechin City in a 4-2 win at Glebe park in the Scottish League Cup first round and scored the last goal in a 7-1 win over East Stirlingshire.

In the summer of 2012, Archdeacon left Clyde and joined Scottish Junior football side Kilbirnie Ladeside. A year later he moved to another junior side, Dalry Thistle. In July 2019 Archdeacon signed for a further junior side, Neilston F.C.
