= Ewan Moyes =

Scottish footballer (born 1990)

Personal information
- Date of birth: 30 March 1990 (age 36)
- Place of birth: Perth, Scotland
- Position: Defender

Team information
- Current team: Jeanfield Swifts

Youth career
- Perth Cubs
- -2009: Hibernian

Senior career*
Years	Team	Apps	(Gls)
2009–2010	Hibernian	0	(0)
2009	→ Livingston (loan)	7	(1)
2010	→ Arbroath (loan)	16	(0)
2010–2011	→ Brechin (loan)	33	(4)
2011–2012	Gateshead	1	(0)
2012–2014	Brechin	60	(3)
2014–2015	East Fife	8	(0)
2015	Montrose	9	(0)
2015–2020	Bonnyrigg Rose		
2020	→ Linlithgow Rose (loan)		
2021	Bo'ness United		
2022–	Jeanfield Swifts		
- * Club domestic league appearances and goals

Ewan Moyes (born 30 March 1990) is a Scottish footballer who plays as a defender for Jeanfield Swifts.

== Career ==
Moyes started his career in the youth academy of Hibernian. He signed his first professional contract with the club in 2009.

With first team opportunities limited, Moyes went on loan to Livingston in August 2009.

The defender had further spells on loan with Arbroath and Brechin before leaving Hibs permanently in 2010.

Following an unsuccessful trial with Crewe Alexandra, Moyes signed for Gateshead in July 2011.

An ankle injury limited Moyes' first team chances with Gateshead. In 2014, he signed for Brechin on a permanent basis.

After two seasons with the Hedgemen, Moyes had short term spells with East Fife and Montrose.

In 2015, Moyes signed for Bonnyrigg Rose. He left the Rose after five seasons.

Moyes had a brief spell with Bo'ness United before signing for Jeanfield Swifts in August 2022.

== Personal life ==
Moyes in the nephew of David Moyes.

In 2013, Moyes was knocked down by a car. He required 12 stitches to a laceration in his back, his nose had to be glued and he suffered a deep cut on his arm.
