= Jim Lister =

Scottish footballer

James Lister
Personal information
- Date of birth: 26 February 1981 (age 45)
- Position: Forward

Senior career*
Years	Team	Apps	(Gls)
?–2007	Oakley United		
2007–2008	Camelon Juniors		
2008	Stenhousemuir (trialist)	1	(0)
2008	Berwick Rangers	9	(1)
2008–2010	Bathgate Thistle		
2010–2011	Alloa Athletic	34	(7)
2011–2012	Brechin City	26	(4)
2012–2013	Dumbarton	34	(12)
2013–2016	Airdrieonians	75	(26)
2016–2017	Forfar Athletic	38	(8)
Total		217	(58)
- * Club domestic league appearances and goals

James Lister (born 26 February 1981) is a Scottish former footballer who played as a forward. Lister played in the Juniors for Oakley United, Camelon Juniors and Bathgate Thistle and in the Scottish Football League for Stenhousemuir, Berwick Rangers, Alloa Athletic, Brechin City, Dumbarton, Airdrieonians and Forfar Athletic.

== Career ==
Lister's career began in the Scottish Junior Leagues firstly at Oakley United, then after moving in July 2007, at Camelon Juniors.

In 2008, he moved up to the Scottish Football League for the first time, playing as a trialist for Stenhousemuir against Dumbarton on 18 March. He then agreed to sign for Stenhousemuir at the end of the 2007–08 season. However, on 21 May 2008, it was announced that he had instead signed for Berwick Rangers. He scored his first goal for Berwick on 4 October 2008, in a 1–1 draw against Elgin City.

Lister then dropped back down into the Juniors, having been linked with a number of clubs, before signing for Bathgate Thistle. On 19 June 2010, he joined Second Division club Alloa Athletic saying he had wanted the chance to return to senior football.

After one season at Alloa, Lister moved to Brechin City on 31 May 2011. One year later he moved clubs again, this time signing for First Division club Dumbarton. At the end of the season Lister was voted Player of the Year by the Dumbarton supporters.

On 11 May 2013, Lister signed for Airdrieonians. At the end of the 2013–14 season he signed a new one-year contract.

Lister joined Forfar in summer 2016 In November 2017, he announced his retirement, having suffered an injury that was expected to keep him out until at least the end of the season.
