= Kevin Byers =

Scottish footballer

Personal information
- Date of birth: 23 August 1979 (age 47)
- Place of birth: Kirkcaldy, Scotland
- Position: Midfielder

Team information
- Current team: Kennoway Star Hearts (manager)

Youth career
- Glenrothes Strollers Colts
- 1996–1997: Raith Rovers

Senior career*
| Years | Team | Apps | (Gls) |
| 1997–1999 | Raith Rovers | 16 | (0) |
| 1999–2001 | Inverness Caledonian Thistle | 43 | (1) |
| 2001 | → Montrose (loan) | 2 | (0) |
| 2001–2004 | Forfar Athletic | 96 | (18) |
| 2004–2011 | Brechin City | 192 | (27) |
| 2011–2012 | Forfar Athletic | 29 | (7) |
| 2012–2013 | Ballingry Rovers | | |
| 2013–2017 | Kennoway Star Hearts | | |
| Total | | 378 | (53) |

Managerial career
- 2018–: Kennoway Star Hearts
- * Club domestic league appearances and goals

Kevin Byers (born 23 August 1979) is a Scottish footballer, who played in the Scottish Football League for Raith Rovers, Inverness Caledonian Thistle, Montrose, Forfar Athletic and Brechin City. He is currently the manager of Kennoway Star Hearts in the SJFA East Superleague.
