= Craig Nelson (footballer) =

Scottish footballer

Personal information
- Date of birth: 28 May 1971 (age 55)
- Place of birth: Coatbridge, Scotland
- Height: 6 ft 1 in (1.85 m)
- Position: Goalkeeper

Youth career
- 1988: Airdrieonians

Senior career*
Years	Team	Apps	(Gls)
1989	Ashfield		
1990–1994	Partick Thistle	91	(0)
1991	→ Cork City (loan)	?	(?)
1994–1996	Heart of Midlothian	24	(0)
1996–1998	Falkirk	9	(0)
1998–2003	Ayr United	125	(0)
2003–2005	St Johnstone	7	(0)
2004–2005	→ Brechin City (loan)	34	(0)
2005–2014	Brechin City	250	(0)
Total		540	(0)

International career
1994	Scotland B	1	(0)
- * Club domestic league appearances and goals

Craig Nelson (born 28 May 1971, in Coatbridge) is a Scottish former football goalkeeper who last played for Brechin City in Scottish League One. He is currently the goalkeeping coach of the club.

Nelson began his career with Partick Thistle before moving to Ireland to join Cork City in January 1991. He returned to Scotland four months later and went on to make 90 league appearances for Thistle before moving to Heart of Midlothian. He stayed at Tynecastle for two seasons (making 24 league appearances) but left to sign for Falkirk.

He remained there for a further two seasons before moving on to Ayr United where he became a stalwart in the Somerset Park side, making 150 appearances in his five seasons there. This included playing in the Scottish League Cup 2002 final, which Ayr lost to Rangers 4–0. In 2003, he joined St Johnstone on a free transfer and made 8 appearances before moving to Brechin City on loan in 2004. He made the move permanent a year later and stayed for the next nine seasons.
