= Craig Molloy =

Scottish footballer

Personal information
- Full name: Craig Molloy
- Date of birth: 26 April 1986 (age 40)
- Place of birth: Greenock, Scotland
- Height: 5 ft 7 in (1.70 m)
- Position: Midfielder

Team information
- Current team: Arthurlie fc

Youth career
- –2003: St Mirren 'D' form U16

Senior career*
Years	Team	Apps	(Gls)
2003–2009	St Mirren	31	(0)
2008	→ Stirling Albion (loan)	10	(0)
2008	→ Stirling Albion (loan)	18	(2)
2009	→ Stenhousemuir (loan)	15	(0)
2009–2010	Stenhousemuir	29	(7)
2010–2016	Brechin City	335	(13)
2016–2017	Hurlford United	23	
2017–2019	Cambuslang Rangers	?	
- * Club domestic league appearances and goals as of 00:03, 5 July 2016 (UTC)

Craig Molloy (born 26 April 1986) is a Scottish footballer who plays as a midfielder for Cambuslang Rangers, in the Scottish Junior Football Association, West Region.

== Career ==
Molloy began his career in the youth teams of St Mirren before progressing to the senior side and making 21 appearances in the First Division and the SPL.

Molloy went on loan to Second Division side Stirling Albion on 18 September 2008, until the end of December after Stirling lost both John O'Neill and Liam Corr to injury. Molloy had also been on loan at Forthbank towards the end of the previous season as well.

He also spent a period on loan to Stenhousemuir, before signing with the Warriors permanently in July 2009. He then signed with Brechin City for the 2010–11 season. Molloy spent six seasons at Brechin and was made club captain under manager Ray McKinnon.

Molloy signed for Hurlford United in June 2016, then moved to fellow Junior side Cambuslang Rangers in October 2017.

== Family ==
His brother Thomas Molloy, (born 23 January 1983), had a spell as YTS with hometown club Morton on leaving school. From there he won a move to Ayr United making one league appearance before dropping to Junior football. He has managed Greenock Juniors since June 2017.
