= Gerry McLauchlan =

Scottish footballer

Personal information
- Full name: Gerry Timothy McLauchlan
- Date of birth: 8 March 1989 (age 37)
- Place of birth: Bishopbriggs, Scotland
- Height: 6 ft 2 in (1.88 m)
- Position: Defender

Team information
- Current team: Brechin City

Youth career
- –2006: Hamilton Academical

Senior career*
Years	Team	Apps	(Gls)
2006–2007	Hamilton Academical	2	(0)
2007–2008	Stranraer	28	(1)
2008–2010	Queen of the South	7	(1)
2008–2009	→ Montrose (loan)	13	(1)
2010	→ Arbroath (loan)	11	(0)
2010–2015	Brechin City	115	(5)
2015–2016	Ayr United	24	(2)
2016–2017	Cowdenbeath	25	(0)
2017–2019	Queen's Park	27	(0)
2019–2021	Pollok	13	(0)
2021–	Brechin City	0	(0)
- * Club domestic league appearances and goals as of 4 January 2021

Gerard Timothy McLauchlan (born 8 March 1989) is a Scottish footballer who plays as a defender in his second spell for Brechin City. McLauchlan has previously played for Hamilton Academical, Stranraer, Queen of the South, Ayr United, Cowdenbeath, Queen's Park and Pollok, as well as Montrose and Arbroath on loan. Although born in Bishopbriggs, McLauchlan is currently resident in the Gorbals, Glasgow.

== Career ==
McLauchlan began his career at Hamilton Academical making two appearances before moving to Stranraer in July 2007. After making 34 appearances in total for the club he signed for Dumfries club Queen of the South in June 2008, on a two-year deal. During his time at The Doonhammers, McLauchlan went out on loan to both Montrose and Arbroath. After making seven league appearances for Queen of the South, McLauchlan moved to Brechin City, joining up with manager Jim Weir for a third time. In May 2015, McLauchlan signed for Ayr United after five years with Brechin City, however after only one season with the Honest Men, McLauchlan was released.

In July 2016, McLauchlan signed for recently relegated Scottish League Two side Cowdenbeath. McLauchlan played for one season at Cowdenbeath as the club fought off a relegation battle.

After playing a season in the juniors for Pollok, McLauchlan would once again play in the SPFL after returning to Brechin City in January 2021.
