= Charlie King (footballer, born 1979) =

Scottish footballer

Personal information
- Full name: Charles Alexander King
- Date of birth: 15 November 1979 (age 46)
- Place of birth: Edinburgh, Scotland
- Position: Striker

Youth career
- Celtic Boys Club

Senior career*
Years	Team	Apps	(Gls)
1996–1999	St Johnstone	4	(0)
1998	→ Ross County (loan)	6	(1)
1998–1999	→ Livingston (loan)	29	(9)
1999–2001	Livingston	30	(1)
2000–2001	→ Stirling Albion (loan)	16	(2)
2001–2012	Brechin City	326	(60)
2012–2013	Forfar Athletic	20	(0)
2013–2016	Brechin Victoria		
2018-2021	St Andrews United		

Managerial career
- 2013–2016: Brechin Victoria
- 2017–2018: Tayport
- 2020-2021: St Andrews United
- 2021–2023: Tynecastle
- 2023–: Scone Thistle
- * Club domestic league appearances and goals

Charles Alexander King (born 15 November 1979) is a Scottish former professional footballer and current manager of Scone Thistle. He had a playing career in the Scottish Football League for several clubs.

A striker, King began his career with St Johnstone in 1996. He remained at McDiarmid Park for three years, making just four league appearances.

In June 1999 he joined Livingston, after being on loan to the Almondvale club the previous season. In all, he made 59 league appearances for Livi, scoring ten goals.

After a loan period at Stirling Albion during the 2000–01 season, he joined Brechin City that spring. Before being released, he was the longest-serving player at the club. He was released on 6 May 2012 by the Brechin City manager at the time, Jim Weir, much to the shock and disappointment of both himself and Brechin fans. He scored his last goal for the club the day before in a 4–2 defeat to Dumbarton.

He joined neighbours Forfar Athletic on a one-year deal on 6 June 2012.

King took his first step into management in May 2013, with his appointment as player-manager of Junior side Brechin Victoria. He left Vics in December 2016, and was appointed as assistant to Broughty Athletic manager Keith Gibson, before succeeding John Ovenstone as Tayport manager in July 2017. King parted company with Tayport in October 2018.

He was appointed manager of St Andrews United in 2020 after serving as assistant manager for two seasons.

King was appointed as manager of Tynecastle in 2021 and held this position until March 2023.

== Honours ==
- Scottish Division Three winner 2001–02
- Scottish Division Two winner 2004–05
