= Glebe Park, Brechin =

Football stadium in Brechin, Scotland

Glebe Park
- "The Glebe"
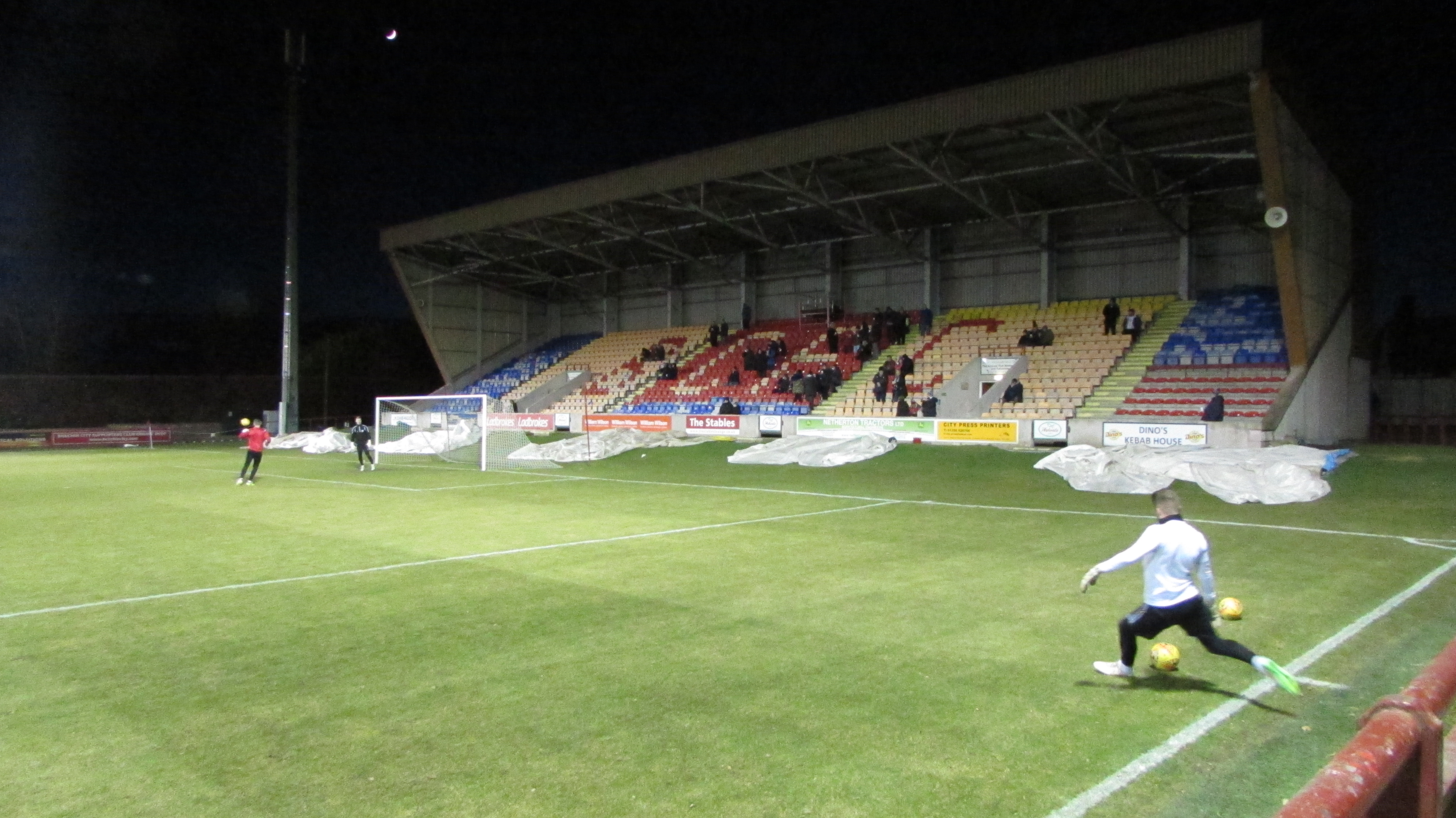
- View of the David H Will Stand

- Location in Angus
- Location: Brechin, Scotland
- Coordinates: 56°44′07″N 2°39′23″W
- Owner: Brechin City
- Capacity: 4,083 (1,519 seated)
- Surface: Grass

Construction
- Opened: 1919

Tenant
- Brechin City (1919–present)

Glebe Park (known as the "Carnegie Fuels Stadium at Glebe Park" for sponsorship reasons) is a football stadium in Brechin, Scotland, which is the home ground of Brechin City.

Glebe Park opened in 1919. The ground had just one portable stand, which had been used at the Perth agricultural show. Brechin City joined the Scottish Football League in 1929, when a pavilion was added and the Cemetery End terrace was covered. The biggest ever attendance was 8,123, against Aberdeen in a Scottish Cup tie played on 3 February 1973. This attendance was greater than the population of Brechin. Floodlights were installed and used for the first time in 1977, in a match against Hibernian.

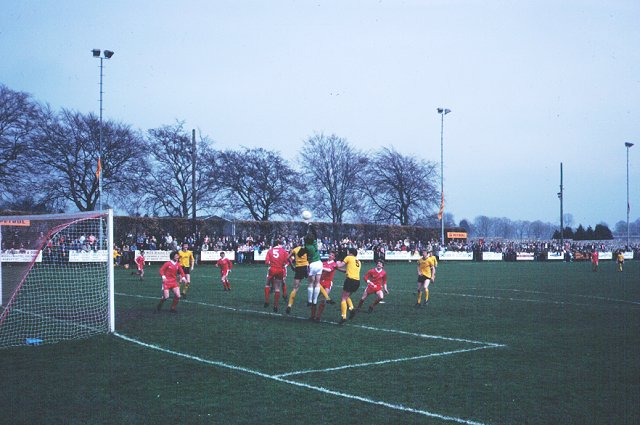
Glebe Park in 1983

The old stand was replaced by a new Main Stand, with 290 seats, in 1981. Sponsorship by the Stewart Milne group and a Football Trust grant of £210,000 financed the construction of a 1,228 seat stand at the Trinity Road end of the ground. This stand had double the capacity of Brechin City's average attendance, which attracted criticism from non-league clubs in England, who believed that the Football Trust should fund their developments instead.

Unusually, the largest stand in the ground was built behind the goal, rather than the side opposite the Main Stand. This was because that side is constrained by a terrace and the Glebe Park hedge, which runs past more than half of the pitch. The hedge was threatened in 2009 because Glebe Park's pitch dimensions were too small for it to meet UEFA requirements, at just 67 yards wide. A fine was suspended by the SFA because Brechin City carried out some work to resolve the problem. There is a small training pitch behind the hedge.

Glebe Park has also been used for the reserve team matches of Scottish Premiership club Aberdeen.
