= 2012–13 East Fife F.C. season =

East Fife
2012–13 season
- Chairman: Sid Collumbine
- Manager: Gordon Durie (Until 4 November 2012); Billy Brown (From 5 November 2012)
- Stadium: Bayview Stadium
- Second Division: Ninth place
- Challenge Cup: Second Round, lost to Cowdenbeath
- League Cup: First Round, lost to Rangers
- Scottish Cup: Third Round, lost to Elgin City
- Top goalscorer: League: Scott McBride (11); All: Scott McBride (12)
- Highest home attendance: 856 vs Berwick Rangers; Second Division play-offs 11 May 2013
- Lowest home attendance: 426 vs Arbroath; Second Division; 9 March 2013 & 426 vs Stranraer; Second Division; 9 April 2013

The 2012–13 season was East Fife's fifth consecutive season in the Scottish Second Division, having been promoted from the Scottish Third Division at the end of the 2007–08 season. East Fife also competed in the Challenge Cup, League Cup and the Scottish Cup.

== Summary ==
=== Season ===
East Fife finished ninth in the Scottish Second Division, entering the play-offs defeating Peterhead 1–0 on aggregate in the final and remained in the Scottish Second Division. They reached the second round of the Challenge Cup, the first round of the League Cup and the third round of the Scottish Cup.

=== Management ===
They began the season under the management of Gordon Durie. On 4 November 2012, Durie resigned as manager due to illness. The following day Billy Brown took over as his replacement.

== Results & fixtures ==
Win Draw Loss Postponed

=== Pre-season ===
11 July 2012 Friendly	East Fife	0 – 4	St Johnstone	Bayview Stadium
19:30		Report	Higgins 6'; Hasselbaink 61'; Trialist 68'; Trialist 77'	Attendance: 566

14 July 2012 Friendly	East Fife	0 – 2	Hibernian	Bayview Stadium
14:00		Report; Scotland on Sunday Report	Sproule 52'; Clancy 79'	Referee: Duncan

18 July 2012 Friendly	Dunfermline Athletic	P – P	East Fife	East End Park
19:30		Report

19 July 2012 Friendly	Dunfermline Athletic	1 – 3	East Fife	East End Park
19:30	Durie 25' (Own goal)	Dunfermline Report; Scotsman Report	Samuel 19'; Durie 41'; Jamieson 81'	Attendance: 800 est Referee: Finnie

21 July 2012 Friendly	East Fife	2 – 0	Falkirk	Bayview Stadium
15:00	Samuel 41'; Malcolm 81'	Report; Report		Referee: Madden

=== Scottish Second Division ===
11 August 2012 Scottish Second Division	Alloa Athletic	1 – 1	East Fife	Recreation Park
15:00	Simmons 74'	SFL Report	McCormack 30'	Attendance: 625; Referee: McDermott

18 August 2012 Scottish Second Division	East Fife	0 – 0	Queen of the South	Bayview Stadium
15:00		SFL Report	Johnston (yellow card) 88' (red card)	Attendance: 628; Referee: Roache

25 August 2012 Scottish Second Division	Brechin City	2 – 1	East Fife	Glebe Park
15:00	Andrew Jackson 11', 13'	BBC Report	Wardlaw 78'	Attendance: 588; Referee: Robertson

1 September 2012 Scottish Second Division	East Fife	1 – 2	Albion Rovers	Bayview Stadium
15:00	McBride 2'	SFL Report	Forster 44' (Own Goal); Brannon 62'	Attendance: 514; Referee: Clancy

15 September 2012 Scottish Second Division	Arbroath	2 – 0	East Fife	Gayfield Park
15:00	Doris 26'; Holmes 28'	SFL Report		Attendance: 624; Referee: Aitken

22 September 2012 Scottish Second Division	East Fife	2 – 3	Ayr United	Bayview Stadium
15:00	Pollock 5'; Barr 83'	SFL Report	Sinclair 9', 34'; McAusland 88'	Attendance: 575; Referee: Hilland

29 September 2012 Scottish Second Division	Stranraer	2 – 6	East Fife	Stair Park
15:00	Borris 44'; Malcolm 78'	East Fife Report	Barr 23'; McManus 33'; Wardlaw 42', 71'; Pollock 57', 66'	Attendance: 292; Referee: Somers

6 October 2012 Scottish Second Division	Stenhousemuir	3 – 0	East Fife	Ochilview Park
15:00	Gemmell 65', 68'; Kean 72'	SFL Report		Attendance: 589; Referee: Dallas

20 October 2012 Scottish Second Division	East Fife	3 – 0	Forfar Athletic	Bayview Stadium
15:00	Muir 38'; S. Smith 89'; McManus 90'	SFL Report	Fotheringham (red card) 7'	Attendance: 541; Referee: Northcroft

28 October 2012 Scottish Second Division	Queen of the South	1 – 0	East Fife	Palmerston Park
15:00	Lyle 4'	SFL Report		Attendance: 1,577; Referee: Salmond

10 November 2012 Scottish Second Division	East Fife	0 – 1	Alloa Athletic	Bayview Stadium
15:00		SFL Report	Holmes 32'	Attendance: 515; Referee: Somers

17 November 2012 Scottish Second Division	Albion Rovers	0 – 3	East Fife	Cliftonhill
15:00		SFL Report	Gormley 11'; Barr 69'; McBride 86'	Attendance: 338; Referee: Dallas

24 November 2012 Scottish Second Division	East Fife	2 – 1	Arbroath	Bayview Stadium
15:00	Jamieson 13'; McBride 46'	SFL Report	Currie 43'	Attendance: 570; Referee: Cook

8 December 2012 Scottish Second Division	East Fife	P – P	Stranraer	Bayview Stadium
15:00		BBC Report

15 December 2012 Scottish Second Division	Ayr United	2 – 3	East Fife	Somerset Park
15:00	White 3' (o.g.); McAusland 17'	SFL Report	McBride 56', 65' (pen.); White 89'	Attendance: 943; Referee: Aitken

18 December 2012 Scottish Second Division	East Fife	0 – 1	Stranraer	Bayview Stadium
19:45		SFL Report	Malcolm 34'	Attendance: 441; Referee: Anderson

22 December 2012 Scottish Second Division	East Fife	3 – 2	Stenhousemuir	Bayview Stadium
15:00	Barr 5'; Campbell 32'; McBride 71'	SFL Report	Kean 57'; Rodgers 69'	Attendance: 408; Referee: Allan

29 December 2012 Scottish Second Division	Forfar Athletic	3 – 2	East Fife	Station Park
15:00	Campbell 33' (Penalty); Denholm 57'; Swankie 58'	SFL Report	Johnstone 7'; Willis 21'; McCormack (red card) 30'	Attendance: 619; Referee: Graham

2 January 2013 Scottish Second Division	Arbroath	1 – 0	East Fife	Gayfield Park
15:00	Sheerin 53'	SFL Report	Johnstone (red card) 47'	Attendance: 813; Referee: Robertson

5 January 2013 Scottish Second Division	East Fife	2 – 0	Albion Rovers	Bayview Stadium
15:00	Samuel 12', 45'	SFL Report		Attendance: 486; Referee: Murray

12 January 2013 Scottish Second Division	East Fife	2 – 2	Brechin City	Bayview Stadium
15:00	Samuel 28'; Barr 37'	SFL Report	Trouten 6'; Carcary 30'	Attendance: 578; Referee: Clancy

19 January 2013 Scottish Second Division	Alloa Athletic	1 – 1	East Fife	Recreation Park
15:00	Marr 34'	SFL Report	McManus 23'	Attendance: 551; Referee: Northcroft

26 January 2013 Scottish Second Division	East Fife	3 – 3	Ayr United	Bayview Stadium
15:00	White 26'; McManus 34', 45+1'	SFL Report	Moffat 5'; McAusland 17'; McDonald 85'	Attendance: 514; Referee: Robertson

2 February 2013 Scottish Second Division	Stranraer	3 – 1	East Fife	Stair Park
15:00	Gribben 9', 29'; Winter 58'	SFL Report	Willis 53'	Attendance: 254; Referee: Colvin

9 February 2013 Scottish Second Division	East Fife	1 – 2	Forfar Athletic	Bayview Stadium
15:00	McBride 88' (Penalty)	SFL Report	Templeman 33', 71'	Attendance: 502; Referee: Charleston

16 February 2013 Scottish Second Division	Stenhousemuir	2 – 1	East Fife	Ochilview Park
15:00	Hodge 60', 85'	SFL Report	McBride 55'	Attendance: 476; Referee: Graham

23 February 2013 Scottish Second Division	Brechin City	P – P	East Fife	Glebe Park
15:00		BBC Report
Note: Postponed due to a waterlogged pitch

2 March 2013 Scottish Second Division	East Fife	2 – 3	Queen of the South	Bayview Stadium
15:00	McManus 64'; Gormley 86'	SFL Report	Reilly 15'; Clark 66'; Durnan 69'	Attendance: 627; Referee: Norcroft

9 March 2013 Scottish Second Division	East Fife	0 – 1	Arbroath	Bayview Stadium
15:00		SFL Report	Bayne 85'	Attendance: 426; Referee: Cook

16 March 2013 Scottish Second Division	Albion Rovers	P – P	East Fife	Cliftonhill Stadium
15:00		BBC Report
Note: Postponed due to snow on pitch

19 March 2013 Scottish Second Division	Albion Rovers	1 – 1	East Fife	Cliftonhill Stadium
19:45	Dallas 31'	SFL Report	Willis 44'	Attendance: 206; Referee: Aitken

23 March 2013 Scottish Second Division	East Fife	P – P	Stranraer	Bayview Stadium
15:00		BBC Report
Note: Postponed due to high winds

30 March 2013 Scottish Second Division	Ayr United	2 – 1	East Fife	Somerset Park
15:00	Buchanan 79'; Winters 87'	SFL Report	Durie 15'	Attendance: 956; Referee: Robertson

2 April 2013 Scottish Second Division	Brechin City	6 – 0	East Fife	Glebe Park
19:45	Carcary 8', 36'; Jackson 15', 46'; McLean 19'; Ferguson 70'	SFL Report		Attendance: 471; Referee: Graham

6 April 2013 Scottish Second Division	Forfar Athletic	3 – 2	East Fife	Station Park
15:00	Malin 20', 51'; Swankie 82'	SFL Report	Sloan 45+1'; McBride 80'	Attendance: 471; Referee: Hilland

9 April 2013 Scottish Second Division	East Fife	1 – 1	Stranraer	Bayview Stadium
19:45	McBride 90+1' (Penalty)	SFL Report	Dunlop 62'	Attendance: 426; Referee: Robertson

13 April 2013 Scottish Second Division	East Fife	1 – 2	Stenhousemuir	Bayview Stadium
15:00	McBride 67'; McCormack (yellow card) 88' (yellow-red card)	SFL Report	Buist 43'; Gemmell 52'	Attendance: 461; Referee: Roache

20 April 2013 Scottish Second Division	East Fife	2 – 1	Alloa Athletic	Bayview Stadium
15:00	Barr 39'; Willis 56'	SFL Report	Tiffoney 84'	Attendance: 497; Referee: Colvin

27 April 2013 Scottish Second Division	Queen of the South	2 – 2	East Fife	Palmerston Park
15:00	Clark 87', 90'	Report	Campbell 36'; Wardlaw 76'	Attendance: 2,568; Referee: McKendrick

4 May 2013 Scottish Second Division	East Fife	0 – 3	Brechin City	Bayview Stadium
15:00		SFL Report	McKenna 70'; Brown 80', 85'	Attendance: 753; Referee: Dallas

=== Second Division play-offs ===
8 May 2013 Play-offs SF R1	Berwick Rangers	1 – 1	East Fife	Shielfield Park
20:00	Lavery 72'	SFL Report	Muir 44'	Attendance: 732; Referee: Salmond

11 May 2013 Play-offs SF R2	East Fife	2 – 1 (a.e.t.) (3 – 2 agg.)	Berwick Rangers	Bayview Stadium
15:00	McDonald 78' (Own goal); Gormley 119'	SFL Report	Lavery 61' (Penalty)	Attendance: 856; Referee: Colvin

15 May 2013 Play-offs Final R1	East Fife	0 – 0	Peterhead	Bayview Stadium
19:45		SFL Report		Attendance: 826; Referee: Beaton

19 May 2013 Play-offs Final R2	Peterhead	0 – 1 (0 – 1 agg.)	East Fife	Balmoor
15:00		SFL Report	Muir 48'	Attendance: 1,855; Referee: Clancy

=== Scottish Challenge Cup ===
28 July 2012 Scottish Challenge Cup round 1	Peterhead	1 – 2	East Fife	Balmoor
15:00	McAllister 75'	SFL Report	McBride 10' (Penalty); Samuel 54'	Attendance: 520; Referee: Aitken

14 August 2012 Scottish Challenge Cup round 2	Cowdenbeath	3 – 0	East Fife	Central Park
19:45	Stevenson 44', 73'; Miller 67'	SFL Report		Attendance: 466; Referee: Tumilty

=== Scottish League Cup ===
7 August 2012 Scottish League Cup round 1	Rangers	4 – 0	East Fife	Ibrox Stadium
19:45	McCulloch 15', 62'; Shiels 34'; Wallace 46'	Rangers Report		Attendance: 38,160; Referee: McKendrick

=== Scottish Cup ===
3 November 2012 Scottish Cup round 3	Elgin City	5 – 1	East Fife	Borough Briggs
15:00	Leslie 27'; Gunn 32'; Moore 55' (pen.); Nicolson 67'; Harkins 73'	BBC Report	Muir 78'	Attendance: 748; Referee: Graham

== Player statistics ==
=== Squad ===
Last updated 9 July 2013

No.	Pos	Nat	Player	Total		Second Division		Other^{[a]}		League Cup		Scottish Cup	
No.	Pos	Nat	Player	Apps	Goals	Apps	Goals	Apps	Goals	Apps	Goals	Apps	Goals
	GK	(Wales) WAL	Calum Antell	30	0	25+0	0	4+0	0	0+0	0	1+0	0
	GK	(Scotland) SCO	Michael Brown	13	0	9+1	0	2+0	0	1+0	0	0+0	0
	GK	(Scotland) SCO	Andrew Collier	2	0	2+0	0	0+0	0	0+0	0	0+0	0
	DF	(Scotland) SCO	Ross Brewster	1	0	0+0	0	0+1	0	0+0	0	0+0	0
	DF	(Scotland) SCO	Steven Campbell	34	2	27+0	2	5+0	0	1+0	0	1+0	0
	DF	(Hong Kong) HKG	Andrew Cook	6	0	4+0	0	1+0	0	1+0	0	0+0	0
	DF	(Scotland) SCO	Scott Durie	41	1	33+0	1	6+0	0	1+0	0	1+0	0
	DF	(Scotland) SCO	Jordon Forster	12	0	12+0	0	0+0	0	0+0	0	0+0	0
	DF	(Scotland) SCO	Robert Malcolm	4	0	2+1	0	0+1	0	0+0	0	0+0	0
	DF	(Scotland) SCO	Darren McCormack	24	1	21+0	1	2+0	0	1+0	0	0+0	0
	DF	(Scotland) SCO	David Muir	38	4	27+3	1	6+0	2	1+0	0	1+0	1
	DF	(Scotland) SCO	Scott Smith	6	1	4+2	1	0+0	0	0+0	0	0+0	0
	DF	(Scotland) SCO	Craig Wedderburn	3	0	3+0	0	0+0	0	0+0	0	0+0	0
	DF	(Scotland) SCO	David White	26	2	18+2	2	5+0	0	0+0	0	1+0	0
	MF	(Scotland) SCO	Bobby Barr	34	6	30+0	6	3+1	0	0+0	0	0+0	0
	MF	(Scotland) SCO	Ross Brown	4	0	0+1	0	1+1	0	0+1	0	0+0	0
	MF	(Scotland) SCO	Sean Jamieson	20	1	5+12	1	1+0	0	0+1	0	0+1	0
	MF	(Scotland) SCO	Craig Johnstone	30	1	21+2	1	5+0	0	1+0	0	1+0	0
	MF	(Scotland) SCO	Dale Keenan	8	0	5+3	0	0+0	0	0+0	0	0+0	0
	MF	(Scotland) SCO	Scott McBride	38	12	22+8	11	6+0	1	1+0	0	1+0	0
	MF	(Scotland) SCO	Jamie Pollock	14	3	7+6	3	0+0	0	0+0	0	1+0	0
	MF	(Scotland) SCO	Robert Sloan	27	1	11+13	1	1+0	0	0+1	0	1+0	0
	MF	(Scotland) SCO	Darren Smith	28	0	21+1	0	3+1	0	1+0	0	1+0	0
	MF	(Scotland) SCO	Paul Willis	36	4	32+0	4	4+0	0	0+0	0	0+0	0
	FW	(Scotland) SCO	Aiden Gordon	1	0	0+0	0	0+0	0	0+0	0	0+1	0
	FW	(Scotland) SCO	Liam Gormley	17	3	4+11	2	0+2	1	0+0	0	0+0	0
	FW	(Scotland) SCO	James Martin	0	0	0+0	0	0+0	0	0+0	0	0+0	0
	FW	(Scotland) SCO	Paul McManus	31	6	22+3	6	4+0	0	1+0	0	1+0	0
	FW	(Trinidad and Tobago) TRI	Collin Samuel	27	4	17+5	3	4+1	1	0+0	0	0+0	0
	FW	(Scotland) SCO	Gareth Wardlaw	20	4	12+2	4	3+2	0	1+0	0	0+0	0

a. Includes other competitive competitions, including the play-offs and the Challenge Cup.

=== Disciplinary record ===
Includes all competitive matches.

Last updated 9 July 2013

Nation	Position	Name	Second Division		Other		League Cup		Scottish Cup		Total	
Nation	Position	Name	Booked	Sent off (straight red)	Booked	Sent off (straight red)	Booked	Sent off (straight red)	Booked	Sent off (straight red)	Booked	Sent off (straight red)
(Wales)	GK	Calum Antell	1	0	0	0	0	0	0	0	1	0
(Scotland)	GK	Michael Brown	1	0	0	0	0	0	0	0	1	0
(Scotland)	GK	Andrew Collier	0	0	0	0	0	0	0	0	0	0
(Scotland)	DF	Ross Brewster	0	0	0	0	0	0	0	0	0	0
(Scotland)	DF	Steven Campbell	2	0	1	0	0	0	0	0	3	0
(Hong Kong)	DF	Andrew Cook	0	0	0	0	0	0	0	0	0	0
(Scotland)	DF	Scott Durie	8	0	0	0	0	0	1	0	9	0
(Scotland)	DF	Jordan Forster	4	0	0	0	0	0	0	0	4	0
(Scotland)	DF	Robert Malcolm	0	0	0	0	0	0	0	0	0	0
(Scotland)	DF	Darren McCormack	5	2	0	0	0	0	0	0	5	2
(Scotland)	DF	David Muir	7	0	3	0	0	0	0	0	10	0
(Scotland)	DF	Scott Smith	0	0	0	0	0	0	0	0	0	0
(Scotland)	DF	Craig Wedderburn	0	0	0	0	0	0	0	0	0	0
(Scotland)	DF	David White	3	0	1	0	0	0	1	0	5	0
(Scotland)	MF	Bobby Barr	3	0	0	0	0	0	0	0	3	0
(Scotland)	MF	Ross Brown	0	0	1	0	0	0	0	0	1	0
(Scotland)	MF	Sean Jamieson	0	0	0	0	0	0	0	0	0	0
(Scotland)	MF	Craig Johnstone	5	1	1	0	0	0	0	0	6	1
(Scotland)	MF	Dale Keenan	1	0	0	0	0	0	0	0	1	0
(Scotland)	MF	Scott McBride	1	0	1	0	0	0	0	0	2	0
(Scotland)	MF	Jamie Pollock	1	0	0	0	0	0	0	0	1	0
(Scotland)	MF	Robert Sloan	2	0	0	0	0	0	0	0	2	0
(Scotland)	MF	Darren Smith	0	0	1	0	0	0	0	0	1	0
(Scotland)	MF	Paul Willis	2	0	0	0	0	0	0	0	2	0
(Scotland)	FW	Aiden Gordon	0	0	0	0	0	0	0	0	0	0
(Scotland)	FW	Liam Gormley	1	0	0	0	0	0	0	0	1	0
(Scotland)	FW	James Martin	0	0	0	0	0	0	0	0	0	0
(Scotland)	FW	Paul McManus	3	0	2	0	0	0	0	0	5	0
(Trinidad and Tobago)	FW	Collin Samuel	1	0	0	0	0	0	0	0	1	0
(Scotland)	FW	Gareth Wardlaw	2	0	0	0	0	0	0	0	2	0

== Team statistics ==
=== League table ===
Pos	Team	Pld	W	D	L	GF	GA	GD	Pts	Promotion, qualification or relegation
6	Stenhousemuir	36	12	13	11	59	59	0	49	
7	Ayr United	36	12	5	19	53	65	−12	41	
8	Stranraer	36	10	7	19	43	71	−28	37	
9	East Fife (O)	36	8	8	20	50	65	−15	32	Qualification for the Second Division play-offs
10	Albion Rovers (R)	36	7	3	26	45	82	−37	24	Relegation to the League Two

Source: SPFL Archive
Rules for classification: 1) points; 2) goal difference; 3) number of goals scored.
(O) Play-off winners; (R) Relegated

=== Division summary ===
Round	1	2	3	4	5	6	7	8	9	10	11	12	13	14	15	16	17	18	19	20	21	22	23	24	25	26	27	28	29	30	31	32	33	34	35	36
Ground	A	H	A	H	A	H	A	A	H	A	H	A	H	A	H	H	A	A	H	H	A	H	A	H	A	H	H	A	A	A	A	H	H	H	A	H
Result	D	D	L	L	L	L	W	L	W	L	L	W	W	W	L	W	L	L	W	D	D	D	L	L	L	L	L	D	L	L	L	D	L	W	D	L
Position	6	7	7	9	9	10	9	9	9	9	9	8	8	7	7	4	6	6	6	6	6	6	6	6	7	8	9	9	9	9	9	9	9	9	9	9

Updated to match(es) played on 17 May 2013. Source:
A = Away; H = Home; W = Win; D = Draw; L = Loss

== Transfers ==
=== Players in ===
Player	From	Fee
(Scotland) Paul McManus	(Scotland) Brechin City	Free
(Scotland) Gareth Wardlaw	(Scotland) Ayr United	Free
(Scotland) Scott McBride	(Scotland) Raith Rovers	Free
(Scotland) Sean Jamieson	(Scotland) Haddington Athletic	Free
(Trinidad and Tobago) Collin Samuel	(Scotland) Arbroath	Free
(Scotland) Jordan Forster	(Scotland) Hibernian	Loan
(Scotland) Scott Smith	(Scotland) Hibernian	Loan
(Scotland) Paul Willis	(Scotland) Dunfermline Athletic	Loan
(Scotland) Jamie Pollock	(Scotland) Motherwell	Free
(Scotland) Bobby Barr	(Scotland) Livingston	Loan
(Wales) Calum Antell	(Scotland) Hibernian	Loan
(Scotland) Dale Keenan	(Scotland) Partick Thistle	Loan
(Scotland) Bobby Barr	(Scotland) Livingston	Free

=== Players out ===
Player	To	Fee
(Scotland) Steven Hislop	(Scotland) Bo'ness United	Free
(Scotland) Neil Janczyk	(Scotland) Berwick Rangers	Free
(Scotland) Paul McQuade	(Scotland) St Andrews United	Free
(Scotland) John Ovenstone	(Scotland) Linlithgow Rose	Free
(Scotland) Ryan Wallace	(Scotland) Dunfermline Athletic	Undisclosed
(Scotland) Scott Dalziel	(Scotland) Brechin City	Free
(Scotland) Bobby Linn	(Scotland) Ballingry Rovers	Free
(Scotland) David White	(Scotland) Bo'ness United	Loan
(Hong Kong) Andrew Cook	Free agent	Free
(Scotland) Jamie Pollock	(Scotland) Kirkintilloch Rob Roy	Free
