= 2011–12 East Fife F.C. season =

East Fife F.C.
2011–12 season
- Chairman: Sid Collumbine
- Manager: John Robertson (until 1 March 2012); Gordon Durie (caretaker)
- Stadium: Bayview Stadium
- Scottish Second Division: 6th
- Scottish Challenge Cup: Quarter-final (eliminated by Falkirk)
- Scottish League Cup: Quarter-final (eliminated by Kilmarnock)
- Scottish Cup: Fourth round (eliminated by Falkirk)
- Top goalscorer: League: Ryan Wallace (20); All: Ryan Wallace (27)
- Highest home attendance: 1,022 vs. Cowdenbeath, 5 November 2011
- Lowest home attendance: 390 vs. Albion Rovers, 24 January 2012
| Home colours | Away colours | Third colours |

The 2011–12 season was East Fife's fourth consecutive season in the Scottish Second Division, having been promoted from the Scottish Third Division at the end of the 2007–08 season. East Fife also competed in the Challenge Cup, League Cup and the Scottish Cup.

== Summary ==
East Fife finished sixth in the Second Division. They reached the Quarter-final of the Challenge Cup, the Quarter-final of the League Cup and the fourth round of the Scottish Cup.

=== Management ===
They began the 2011–12 season under the management of John Robertson. On 1 March 2012, Robertson was sacked with Gordon Durie being appointed as caretaker manager. On 11 March, he was made manager on a permanent basis with Gordon Chisholm being appointed as his assistant.

== Results & fixtures ==
=== Preseason ===
Win Draw Loss Postponed

| 5 July 2011 Friendly | East Fife | 0–3 | Heart of Midlothian | Bayview Stadium, Methil |
| 19:45 | | Scotsman Report | Wallace 40'; Grainger 59'; Novikovas 60' | Referee: John Beaton |

| 9 July 2011 Friendly | East Fife | 1–3 | Hibernian | Bayview Stadium, Methil |
| | Ogleby 36' (pen.) | Hibernian FC | Thornhill 57', 75'; Trialist 83' | Referee: Calum Murray |

| 16 July 2011 Gilvenbank Hotel Football Festival Semi-Final | East Fife | 0 – 0; 7 – 6 (pens.) | Raith Rovers | Bayview Stadium, Methil |
| 13:00 | | Raith Rovers Report | | Referee: Craig Charleston |

| 17 July 2011 The Gilvenbank Hotel Football Festival Final | East Fife | 1–0 | Dundee | Bayview Stadium, Methil |
| | McKinlay 18' | Dundee Report | | Referee: Brian Colvin |

=== Scottish Second Division ===
| 6 August 2011 SSD | Stirling Albion | 1–0 | East Fife | Doubletree Dunblane Stadium, Stirling |
| 15:00 | Davidson 76' | BBC Report | | Attendance: 688; Referee: Muir |

| 13 August 2011 SSD | East Fife | 2–0 | Airdrie United | Bayview Stadium, Methil |
| 15:00 | Johnstone 36'; Linn 64'; Muir (red card) 71' | BBC Report | | Attendance: 759; Referee: McDermott |

| 20 August 2011 SSD | Arbroath | 3–0 | East Fife | Gayfield Park, Arbroath |
| 15:00 | Swankie 28'; Doris 69', 81' (pen.) | BBC Report | | Attendance: 723; Referee: McKendrick |

| 27 August 2011 SSD | East Fife | 0–6 | Dumbarton | Bayview Stadium, Methil |
| 15:00 | | SFL Report | McBride 17'; Prunty 20', 33', 79', 85'; Lyden 45' | Attendance: 635; Referee: McLean |

| 10 September 2011 SSD | Cowdenbeath | 3–2 | East Fife | Central Park, Cowdenbeath |
| 15:00 | Stewart 17'; Park 52' (o.g.); Robertson 76' | BBC Report | Wallace 3'; Muir 62' | Attendance: 540; Referee: Madden |

| 17 September 2011 SSD | East Fife | 1–1 | Brechin City | Bayview Stadium, Methil |
| 15:00 | Wallace 8' | BBC Report | Lister 57' | Attendance: 501; Referee: McKendrick |

| 24 September 2011 SSD | Stenhousemuir | 2–1 | East Fife | Ochilview Park, Stenhousemuir |
| 15:00 | Kean 19'; Rodgers 88' | BBC Report | Wallace 56' | Attendance: 642; Referee: Beaton |

| 1 October 2011 SSD | East Fife | 4–3 | Forfar Athletic | Bayview Stadium, Methil |
| 15:00 | Ovenstone 15'; Muir 32'; Ogleby 44'; Wallace 83' | BBC Report | Byers 19'; Ovenstone 40' (o.g.); Shaughnessy 53'; McHugh (red card) 76' | Attendance: 533; Referee: Clancy |

| 15 October 2011 SSD | Albion Rovers | 0–3 | East Fife | Cliftonhill, Coatbridge |
| 15:00 | | BBC Report | Johnstone 38', 51'; Linn 83' | Attendance: 403; Referee: Northcroft |

| 22 October 2011 SSD | East Fife | 1–0 | Stirling Albion | Bayview Stadium, Methil |
| 15:00 | Wallace 88' | BBC Report | | Attendance: 617; Referee: McDermott |

| 29 October 2011 SSD | Airdrie United | 1–3 | East Fife | Excelsior Stadium, Airdrie |
| 15:00 | Donnelly 74'; Lovering (red card) 82' | BBC Report | Wallace 34'; Johnstone 81'; Linn 85' | Attendance: 849; Referee: McDermott |

| 5 November 2011 SSD | East Fife | 1–3 | Cowdenbeath | Bayview Stadium, Methil |
| 15:00 | Wallace 6' | BBC Report | Linton 48'; Robertson 62'; Morton 90' | Attendance: 1,022; Referee: Brines |

| 12 November 2011 SSD | Dumbarton | 3–0 | East Fife | Strathclyde Homes Stadium |
| 15:00 | Agnew 34'; Gilhaney 60'; Lithgow 68' | SFL Report | | Attendance: 678; Referee: Hilland |

| 26 November 2011 SSD | Brechin City | 0–2 | East Fife | Glebe Park |
| 15:00 | | SFL Report | Linn 1'; Ogleby 22' | Attendance: 508; Referee: Charleston |

| 3 December 2011 SSD | East Fife | 1–3 | Stenhousemuir | Bayview Stadium, Methil |
| 15:00 | Linn 80' | SFL Report | Kean 15'; Rodgers 48'; Quinn 90' | Attendance: 508; Referee: Winter |

| 10 December 2011 SSD | Forfar Athletic | P – P | East Fife | Station Park, Forfar |
| 15:00 |

| 17 December 2011 SSD | East Fife | P – P | Albion Rovers | Bayview Stadium, Methil |
| 15:00 |

| 26 December 2011 SSD | East Fife | P – P | Dumbarton | Bayview Stadium, Methil |
| 15:00 |

| 2 January 2012 SSD | Cowdenbeath | 4–0 | East Fife | Central Park, Cowdenbeath |
| | Morton 10'; Cameron 60'; Ramsay 75'; McKenzie 90' | BBC Report | | Attendance: 485; Referee: Colvin |

| 14 January 2012 SSD | East Fife | 2–2 | Arbroath | Bayview Stadium, Methil |
| 15:00 | Cook 6'; Hislop 52' | SFL Report | Malcolm 31'; Swankie 78' | Attendance: 617; Referee: Hilland |

| 21 January 2012 SSD | Stirling Albion | 0–1 | East Fife | Doubletree Dunblane Stadium |
| 15:00 | | BBC Report | McCormack (red card) 20'; Wallace 51' | Attendance: 608; Referee: Murray |

| 24 January 2012 SSD | East Fife | 2–0 | Albion Rovers | Bayview Stadium, Methil |
| 19:45 | Sloan 77'; Linn 88' | SFL Report | | Attendance: 390; Referee: Hilland |

| 28 January 2012 SSD | Stenhousemuir | 1–0 | East Fife | Ochilview Park, Stenhousemuir |
| 15:00 | Rodgers 59' | SFL Report | | Attendance: 687; Referee: Conroy |

| 4 February 2012 SSD | East Fife | P – P | Brechin City | Bayview Stadium, Methil |
| 15:00 |

| 11 February 2012 SSD | Albion Rovers | 1–1 | East Fife | Cliftonhill |
| 15:00 | Halsman 83' | SFL Report | Wallace 57' | Attendance: 348; Referee: Muir |

| 18 February 2012 SSD | East Fife | 4–0 | Forfar Athletic | Bayview Stadium, Methil |
| 15:00 | Sloan 11' (Penalty), 15'; Hislop 36'; Wallace 70' | SFL Report | | Attendance: 536; Referee: Charleston |

| 21 February 2012 SSD | East Fife | 1–2 | Dumbarton | Bayview Stadium, Methil |
| 19:45 | Linn 23' | SFL Report | Gilhaney 52'; Graham 79' | Attendance: 397; Referee: Finnie |

| 25 February 2012 SSD | East Fife | 2–0 | Airdrie United | Bayview Stadium, Methil |
| 15:00 | Sloan 42' (Penalty); Johnstone 87' | SFL Report | Adam (red card) 37'; Lynch (yellow card) 78' (red card) | Attendance: 535; Referee: Northcroft |

| 28 February 2012 SSD | Forfar Athletic | 3–2 | East Fife | Station Park |
| 19:45 | Low 4'; Templeman 15' (Penalty), 64' | SFL Report | Sloan 19' (Penalty); Wallace 90' (Penalty) | Attendance: 432; Referee: Collum |

| 3 March 2012 SSD | Arbroath | 2–2 | East Fife | Gayfield Park, Arbroath |
| 15:00 | Caddis 6', 15' | SFL Report | Sloan 28'; Hislop 43'; White (yellow card) 95' (red card) | Attendance: 842; Referee: Tumilty |

| 6 March 2012 SSD | East Fife | 2–2 | Brechin City | Bayview Stadium, Methil |
| 19:45 | Sloan 25' (pen.), 45' | SFL Report | McManus 21'; McKenna 34' | Attendance: 416; Referee: Somers |

| 10 March 2012 SSD | East Fife | 0–1 | Cowdenbeath | Bayview Stadium, Methil |
| 15:00 | | SFL Report | McKenzie 43' | Attendance: 926; Referee: McKendrick |

| 17 March 2012 SSD | Dumbarton | 0–4 | East Fife | Dumbarton Football Stadium, Dumbarton |
| 15:00 | | SFL Report | Wallace 4', 24'; Grindlay 23' (Own goal); Dalziel 51' | Attendance: 713; Referee: Richmond |

| 24 March 2012 SSD | Brechin City | 1–3 | East Fife | Glebe Park |
| 15:00 | Moyes 16' | SFL Report | Wallace 31', 51', 90' | Attendance: 525; Referee: Madden |

| 31 March 2012 SSD | East Fife | 1–1 | Stenhousemuir | Bayview Stadium, Methil |
| 15:00 | Wallace 8'; White (yellow card) 88' (yellow-red card) | SFL Report | Ferguson 81' (pen.) | Attendance: 742; Referee: Cook |

| 7 April 2012 SSD | Forfar Athletic | 1–4 | East Fife | Station Park |
| 15:00 | Byers 32' | SFL Report | Dalziel 15', 90'; Wallace 18', 53' | Attendance: 559; Referee: McDermott |

| 14 April 2012 SSD | East Fife | 1–2 | Albion Rovers | Bayview Stadium, Methil |
| 15:00 | Muir 82' | SFL Report | Chaplain 14'; Gemmell 40'; Werndly (yellow card) 90' (yellow-red card) | Attendance: 566; Referee: Hilland |

| 21 April 2012 SSD | East Fife | 1–0 | Stirling Albion | Bayview Stadium, Methil |
| 15:00 | Wallace 90' (Penalty) | SFL Report | | Attendance: 495; Referee: Tumilty |

| 28 April 2012 SSD | Airdrie United | 2–0 | East Fife | Excelsior Stadium |
| 15:00 | Lynch 51'; Bain 82'; McLaren (red card) 91' | SFL Report | White (red card) 92' | Attendance: 1,223; Referee: Beaton |

| 5 May 2012 SSD | East Fife | 1–3 | Arbroath | Bayview Stadium, Methil |
| 15:00 | Muir 90' | SFL Report | Samuel 8'; Caddis 29'; Sibanda 72' | Attendance: 597; Referee: O'Reilly |

=== Scottish Cup ===
| 19 November 2011 Scottish Cup round 3 | East Fife | 5–0 | East Stirlingshire | Bayview Stadium, Methil |
| 15:00 | Ogleby 13', 44'; Wallace 49'; Linn 71'; Sloan 79' | BBC Report | | Attendance: 585; Referee: Aitken |

| 7 January 2012 Scottish Cup round 4 | Falkirk | 2–0 | East Fife | Falkirk Stadium, Falkirk |
| 15:00 | Dods 7'; El Alagui 21' | BBC Sport | | Attendance: 2,475; Referee: McKendrick |

=== Scottish League Cup ===
| 30 July 2011 Scottish League Cup round 1 | East Fife | 2–1 | Elgin City | Bayview Stadium, Methil |
| 15:00 | Ogleby 60'; Wallace 72' | BBC Report | Cameron 73' | Attendance: 514; Referee: Cook |

| 23 August 2011 Scottish League Cup round 2 | East Fife | 2–1 | Dunfermline Athletic | Bayview Stadium, Methil |
| 19:45 | Linn 4'; Dalziel 54' | BBC Report | Buchanan 12' | Attendance: 1,262; Referee: Charleston |

| 20 September 2011 Scottish League Cup round 3 | Aberdeen | 3 – 3 (a.e.t.) (3–4 p) | East Fife | Pittodrie Stadium, Aberdeen |
| 19:45 | McArdle 40'; Mackie 46'; Fallon 90' | BBC Report | Wallace 31'; Park 54'; Sloan 57' | Attendance: 3,964; Referee: McLean |
| | Penalties |
| | Fallon (penalty missed); Magennis (penalty missed); Arnason (penalty scored); Pawlett (penalty scored); Foster (penalty scored); Clark (penalty missed) | | Ogleby (penalty scored); Smith (penalty scored); Dalziel (penalty missed); Linn (penalty missed); Hislop (penalty scored); Park (penalty scored) |

| 25 October 2011 Scottish League Cup QF | Kilmarnock | 2–0 | East Fife | Rugby Park, Kilmarnock |
| 19:45 | Sissoko 73'; Harkins 81' | BBC Report | Ogleby (yellow card) 45' (red card) | Attendance: 4,029; Referee: Tumilty |

=== Scottish Challenge Cup ===
| 23 July 2011 Scottish Challenge Cup round 1 | Montrose | 1–6 | East Fife | Links Park, Montrose |
| | McPhee 73' | SFL Report | Linn 16'; Ogleby 27', 51', 63' (pen.); Wallace 31'; Young 64' | Attendance: 404; Referee: Anderson |

| 9 August 2011 Scottish Challenge Cup round 2 | East Fife | 2–0 | Elgin City | Bayview Stadium, Methil |
| | Wallace 52', 77' | BBC Report | | Attendance: 408; Referee: Tumilty |

| 4 September 2011 Scottish Challenge Cup QF | East Fife | 1–4 | Falkirk | Bayview Stadium, Methil |
| 15:00 | Wallace 27' | BBC Report | Millar 42'; Higginbotham 52', 87'; Sibbald 54' | Attendance: 1,064; Referee: Colvin |

=== Fife cup ===
| 30 August 2011 Fife Cup Semi-Final | East Fife | 0–6 | Cowdenbeath | Bayview Stadium, Methil |
| | | Cowdembeath Report | Ferguson 24', 31' (pen.), 34', 57'; Stewart 44'; O'Brien 58' | Referee: Lambie |

== Player statistics ==
=== Squad ===
Last updated 6 May 2012

| No. | Pos | Nat | Player | Total | | Scottish Second Division | | Scottish Cup | | League Cup | | Challenge Cup | |
| No. | Pos | Nat | Player | Apps | Goals | Apps | Goals | Apps | Goals | Apps | Goals | Apps | Goals |
|---|---|---|---|---|---|---|---|---|---|---|---|---|---|
| | GK | (Scotland) SCO | Michael Brown | 29 | 0 | 23+1 | 0 | 2+0 | 0 | 1+0 | 0 | 2+0 | 0 |
| | GK | (Scotland) SCO | Mark Ridgers | 17 | 0 | 13+0 | 0 | 0+0 | 0 | 3+0 | 0 | 1+0 | 0 |
| | GK | (Scotland) SCO | Andrew Collier | 1 | 0 | 0+1 | 0 | 0+0 | 0 | 0+0 | 0 | 0+0 | 0 |
| | DF | (Scotland) SCO | Darren McCormack | 17 | 0 | 16+0 | 0 | 1+0 | 0 | 0+0 | 0 | 0+0 | 0 |
| | DF | (England) ENG | David Cowan | 3 | 0 | 2+1 | 0 | 0+0 | 0 | 0+0 | 0 | 0+0 | 0 |
| | DF | (Scotland) SCO | Steven Campbell | 29 | 0 | 22+0 | 0 | 1+1 | 0 | 2+0 | 0 | 3+0 | 0 |
| | DF | (Scotland) SCO | Scott Durie | 39 | 0 | 29+1 | 0 | 2+0 | 0 | 4+0 | 0 | 3+0 | 0 |
| | DF | (Scotland) SCO | David Muir | 39 | 4 | 25+6 | 4 | 2+0 | 0 | 3+0 | 0 | 3+0 | 0 |
| | DF | (Scotland) SCO | John Ovenstone | 30 | 1 | 19+4 | 1 | 0+1 | 0 | 3+0 | 0 | 3+0 | 0 |
| | DF | (Hong Kong) HKG | Andrew Cook | 30 | 1 | 22+4 | 1 | 2+0 | 0 | 0+1 | 0 | 0+1 | 0 |
| | DF | (Scotland) SCO | David White | 31 | 0 | 27+0 | 0 | 2+0 | 0 | 2+0 | 0 | 0+0 | 0 |
| | DF | (Scotland) SCO | Chris Innes | 1 | 0 | 1+0 | 0 | 0+0 | 0 | 0+0 | 0 | 0+0 | 0 |
| | MF | (Australia) AUS | Matthew Park | 21 | 1 | 14+0 | 0 | 0+0 | 0 | 4+0 | 1 | 3+0 | 0 |
| | MF | (Scotland) SCO | Craig Johnstone | 36 | 5 | 16+12 | 5 | 0+2 | 0 | 2+1 | 0 | 3+0 | 0 |
| | MF | (Scotland) SCO | Robert Sloan | 39 | 10 | 16+16 | 8 | 1+0 | 1 | 2+1 | 1 | 1+2 | 0 |
| | MF | (Scotland) SCO | Lloyd Young | 8 | 1 | 2+1 | 0 | 0+0 | 0 | 1+1 | 0 | 0+3 | 1 |
| | MF | (Scotland) SCO | Darren Smith | 38 | 0 | 26+4 | 0 | 2+0 | 0 | 4+0 | 0 | 2+0 | 0 |
| | MF | (Scotland) SCO | Paul McQuade | 16 | 0 | 3+10 | 0 | 1+0 | 0 | 0+0 | 0 | 0+2 | 0 |
| | MF | (Scotland) SCO | Neil Janczyk | 19 | 0 | 16+2 | 0 | 0+1 | 0 | 0+0 | 0 | 0+0 | 0 |
| | MF | (Scotland) SCO | Ross Brown | 1 | 0 | 0+1 | 0 | 0+0 | 0 | 0+0 | 0 | 0+0 | 0 |
| | FW | (Scotland) SCO | Steve Hislop | 33 | 3 | 14+13 | 3 | 0+2 | 0 | 1+1 | 0 | 0+2 | 0 |
| | FW | (Scotland) SCO | Bobby Linn | 44 | 10 | 35+0 | 7 | 2+0 | 1 | 4+0 | 1 | 3+0 | 1 |
| | FW | (Scotland) SCO | Ryan Wallace | 41 | 27 | 32+0 | 20 | 2+0 | 1 | 4+0 | 2 | 3+0 | 4 |
| | FW | (Scotland) SCO | Scott Dalziel | 31 | 4 | 10+16 | 3 | 0+0 | 0 | 1+2 | 1 | 1+1 | 0 |
| | FW | (Wales) WAL | Robert Ogleby | 19 | 8 | 13+1 | 2 | 1+0 | 2 | 3+0 | 1 | 1+0 | 3 |
| | FW | (Scotland) SCO | Jamie Devlin | 1 | 0 | 0+1 | 0 | 0+0 | 0 | 0+0 | 0 | 0+0 | 0 |
| | FW | (Scotland) SCO | James Martin | 3 | 0 | 0+3 | 0 | 0+0 | 0 | 0+0 | 0 | 0+0 | 0 |

=== Disciplinary record ===
Includes all competitive matches.

Last updated 6 May 2012

| Nation | Position | Name | Scottish Second Division | | Scottish Cup | | League Cup | | Challenge Cup | | Total | |
| Nation | Position | Name | Yellow card | Red card | Yellow card | Red card | Yellow card | Red card | Yellow card | Red card | Yellow card | Red card |
| (Scotland) | GK | Michael Brown | 0 | 0 | 0 | 0 | 0 | 0 | 0 | 0 | 0 | 0 |
| (Scotland) | GK | Mark Ridgers | 0 | 0 | 0 | 0 | 0 | 0 | 0 | 0 | 0 | 0 |
| (Scotland) | GK | Andrew Collier | 0 | 0 | 0 | 0 | 0 | 0 | 0 | 0 | 0 | 0 |
| (Scotland) | DF | Darren McCormack | 1 | 1 | 0 | 0 | 0 | 0 | 0 | 0 | 1 | 1 |
| (England) | DF | David Cowan | 0 | 0 | 0 | 0 | 0 | 0 | 0 | 0 | 0 | 0 |
| (Scotland) | DF | Steven Campbell | 1 | 0 | 0 | 0 | 1 | 0 | 0 | 0 | 2 | 0 |
| (Scotland) | DF | Scott Durie | 5 | 0 | 0 | 0 | 0 | 0 | 0 | 0 | 5 | 0 |
| (Scotland) | DF | David Muir | 2 | 1 | 0 | 0 | 1 | 0 | 0 | 0 | 3 | 1 |
| (Scotland) | DF | John Ovenstone | 2 | 0 | 0 | 0 | 0 | 0 | 0 | 0 | 2 | 0 |
| (Hong Kong) | DF | Andrew Cook | 5 | 0 | 0 | 0 | 0 | 0 | 0 | 0 | 5 | 0 |
| (Scotland) | DF | David White | 6 | 3 | 0 | 0 | 1 | 0 | 0 | 0 | 7 | 3 |
| (Australia) | MF | Matthew Park | 4 | 0 | 0 | 0 | 0 | 0 | 0 | 0 | 4 | 0 |
| (Scotland) | MF | Craig Johnstone | 4 | 0 | 0 | 0 | 0 | 0 | 0 | 0 | 4 | 0 |
| (Scotland) | MF | Robert Sloan | 1 | 0 | 0 | 0 | 0 | 0 | 0 | 0 | 1 | 0 |
| (Scotland) | MF | Lloyd Young | 0 | 0 | 0 | 0 | 0 | 0 | 0 | 0 | 0 | 0 |
| (Scotland) | MF | Darren Smith | 5 | 0 | 0 | 0 | 0 | 0 | 0 | 0 | 5 | 0 |
| (Scotland) | MF | Paul McQuade | 1 | 0 | 0 | 0 | 0 | 0 | 0 | 0 | 1 | 0 |
| (Scotland) | MF | Ross Brown | 0 | 0 | 0 | 0 | 0 | 0 | 0 | 0 | 0 | 0 |
| (Scotland) | MF | Neil Janczyk | 2 | 0 | 0 | 0 | 0 | 0 | 0 | 0 | 2 | 0 |
| (Scotland) | FW | Steve Hislop | 1 | 0 | 0 | 0 | 0 | 0 | 0 | 0 | 1 | 0 |
| (Scotland) | FW | Bobby Linn | 1 | 0 | 0 | 0 | 1 | 0 | 0 | 0 | 2 | 0 |
| (Scotland) | FW | Ryan Wallace | 4 | 0 | 1 | 0 | 1 | 0 | 0 | 0 | 6 | 0 |
| (Scotland) | FW | Scott Dalziel | 3 | 0 | 0 | 0 | 0 | 0 | 0 | 0 | 3 | 0 |
| (Wales) | FW | Robert Ogleby | 1 | 0 | 0 | 0 | 2 | 1 | 0 | 0 | 3 | 1 |
| (Scotland) | FW | Jamie Devlin | 0 | 0 | 0 | 0 | 0 | 0 | 0 | 0 | 0 | 0 |
| (Scotland) | FW | James Martin | 0 | 0 | 0 | 0 | 0 | 0 | 0 | 0 | 0 | 0 |

=== Awards ===
Last updated 4 May 2012

| Nation | Name | Award | Month |
|---|---|---|---|
| (Scotland) | Mark Ridgers | Young Player of the Month | September |
| (Scotland) | John Robertson | Second Division Manager of the Month | October |
| (Scotland) | Ryan Wallace | Ginger Boot Winner | March |

== Team statistics ==
=== League table ===
| Pos | Team | Pld | W | D | L | GF | GA | GD | Pts | Promotion, qualification or relegation |
|---|---|---|---|---|---|---|---|---|---|---|
| 4 | Airdrie United (P) | 36 | 14 | 10 | 12 | 68 | 60 | +8 | 52 (Note: Airdrie United lost the final of the First Division playoffs to Dumbarton. However following the demotion of Rangers to the third division prior to the beginning of the 2012-13 season, Dundee were promoted from the First Division to the SPL, and Airdrie United were promoted to the First Division to take their place. Stranraer were promoted from the Third to the Second Division to take the place of Airdrie United) | Qualification for the First Division play-offs |
| 5 | Stenhousemuir | 36 | 15 | 6 | 15 | 54 | 49 | +5 | 51 | |
| 6 | East Fife | 36 | 14 | 6 | 16 | 55 | 57 | −2 | 48 | |
| 7 | Forfar Athletic | 36 | 11 | 9 | 16 | 59 | 72 | −13 | 42 | |
| 8 | Brechin City | 36 | 10 | 11 | 15 | 47 | 62 | −15 | 41 | |

Source: SPFL Archive
Rules for classification: 1) points; 2) goal difference; 3) number of goals scored.
(P) Promoted

== Transfers ==
=== Players in ===
| Player | From | Fee |
|---|---|---|
| (Hong Kong) Andrew Cook | (Scotland) Brechin City | Free |
| (Scotland) David White | (Scotland) Brechin City | Free |
| (Scotland) Darren Smith | (Scotland) Alloa Athletic | Free |
| (Scotland) Scott Dalziel | (Scotland) Stenhousemuir | Free |
| (Wales) Robert Ogleby | (Scotland) Heart of Midlothian | Loan |
| (Australia) Matthew Park | (Scotland) Heart of Midlothian | Loan |
| (Scotland) Mark Ridgers | (Scotland) Heart of Midlothian | Loan |
| (Scotland) Paul McQuade | (Scotland) St Mirren | Free |
| (Scotland) Darren McCormack | (Scotland) Ross County | Free |
| (Scotland) Neil Janczyk | (Scotland) Brechin City | Free |

=== Players out ===
| Player | To | Fee |
|---|---|---|
| (Scotland) Shaun Fagan | (Scotland) Stirling Albion | Free |
| (Scotland) Jim Hamilton | Free agent | Free |
| (Scotland) Darren Thomson | (Scotland) Glenrothes | Free |
| (Scotland) Stuart Cargill | (Scotland) Dundonald Bluebell | Free |
| (Scotland) Jonathan Smart | (Scotland) Montrose | Free |
| (Scotland) Andrew Stobie | (Scotland) Edinburgh City | Free |
| (Scotland) Marc McCulloch | (Scotland) Stirling Albion | Free |
| (Scotland) Andrew Collier | (Scotland) Glenrothes | Free |
| (Scotland) Lloyd Young | (Scotland) Montrose | Loan |
| (Scotland) Lloyd Young | (Scotland) Montrose | Free |
