= 2010–11 East Fife F.C. season =

East Fife
2010–11 season
- Chairman: Sid Columbine
- Manager: Stevie Crawford; John Robertson
- Stadium: Bayview Stadium
- Second Division: Fifth place
- Challenge Cup: Quarter-Final, lost to Queen of the South
- League Cup: First round, lost to Raith Rovers
- Scottish Cup: Fourth round, lost to Aberdeen
- Highest home attendance: 846 vs. Alloa Athletic, 30 April 2011
- Lowest home attendance: 314 vs. Peterhead, 1 March 2011
- Average home league attendance: 548

The 2010–11 season was East Fife's third consecutive season in the Scottish Second Division, having been promoted from the Scottish Third Division at the end of the 2007–08 season. They also competed in the Challenge Cup, League Cup and the Scottish Cup.

== Summary ==
East Fife finished fifth in the Second Division. They reached the Quarter-Final of the Challenge Cup, losing 5–0 to Queen of the South. They reached the first round of the League Cup and the fourth round of the Scottish Cup.

=== Management ===
They started season 2010–11 under the management of Stevie Crawford. On 25 October 2010, Crawford resigned as manager but stayed with the club as a player. On 26 October 2010, John Robertson was appointed as manager.

== Results and fixtures ==
Win Draw Loss

=== Scottish Second Division ===
7 August 2010 SFL2	East Fife	3–3	Airdrie United	Bayview Stadium
	Hislop 30'; Young 52'; Linn 59'; Muir (red card) 90'	SFL Report	Gemmill 50'; Grant 64'; Watt 70'	Attendance: 810; Referee: Watters

14 August 2010 SFL2	Alloa Athletic	3–2	East Fife	Recreation Park
	Prunty 51'; McDonald 68'; Lister 77'	BBC Report	Johnstone 54'; Smart 65'	Attendance: 688; Referee: Finnie

21 August 2010 SFL2	East Fife	2–1	Peterhead	Bayview Stadium
	Johnstone 76'; Sloan 82'	BBC Report	Bavidge 43'	Attendance: 565; Referee: Conroy

28 August 2010 SFL2	East Fife	6–0	Dumbarton	Bayview Stadium
	Young 15'; Byrne 35', 44', 71'; Linn 59'; Sloan 83'	BBC Report		Attendance: 687; Referee: Norris

11 September 2010 SFL2	Forfar Athletic	3–2	East Fife	Station Park
	Templeman 54', 77', 94'	BBC Report	Johnstone 13'; Ovenstone 86'	Attendance: 590; Referee: Robertson

18 September 2010 SFL2	East Fife	2–3	Ayr United	Bayview Stadium
	Sloan 28' (pen.); Byrne 34'	BBC Report	Roberts 13' (pen.), 45' (pen.), 90' (pen.)	Attendance: 664; Referee: McDermott

25 September 2010 SFL2	Livingston	1– 1	East Fife	Braidwood Motor Company Stadium
15:00	De Vita 53'	BBC Report	Byrne 69'	Attendance: 1,769; Referee: Brines

2 October 2010 SFL2	Stenhousemuir	1–1	East Fife	Ochilview Park
	Murray 66'	BBC Report	Ovenstone 51'	Attendance: 679; Referee: Hilland

16 October 2010 SFL2	East Fife	1–3	Brechin City	Bayview Stadium
	Linn 14'	BBC Report	Molloy 42'; McKenna 56', 63'	Attendance: 336; Referee: Colvin

23 October 2010 SFL2	East Fife	1–3	Forfar Athletic	Bayview Stadium
	Linn 53'	BBC Report	Campbell 44', 70'; Fotheringham 60'	Attendance: 524; Referee: McKendrick

30 October 2010 SFL2	Dumbarton	4–1	East Fife	Strathclyde Homes Stadium
	McShane 31'; Durie 47' (o.g.); Gilhaney 89', 92'	BBC Report	Byrne 39'	Attendance: 585; Referee: Law

6 November 2010 SFL2	East Fife	4–1	Alloa Athletic	Bayview Stadium
	Linn 16'; Hislop 55'; Sloan 61' (pen.), 82'	BBC Report	Walker 50'	Attendance: 435

13 November 2010 SFL2	Peterhead	2–2	East Fife	Balmoor
	Bavidge 87'; Anderson 89'	BBC Report	Byrne 47'; Johnstone 60'	Attendance: 594; Referee: Beaton

11 December 2010 SFL2	East Fife	6–0	Stenhousemuir	Bayview Stadium
	Muir 19'; Crawford 32', 68'; Johnstone 33'; Sloan 45'; Linn 61'	BBC Report		Attendance: 472; Referee: Clancy

18 January 2011 SFL2	East Fife	2–4	Livingston	Bayview Stadium
19:45	Crawford 19'; Sloan 61' (pen.)	BBC Report	Deuchar 57', 65', 87'; O'Byrne (red card) 80'; Russell 82'	Attendance: 548; Referee: Beaton

29 January 2011 SFL2	Livingston	4–3	East Fife	Braidwood Motor Company Stadium
15:00	Jacobs 1', 89'; Fox 12'; Barr 82'	BBC Report	Linn 28'; Crawford 72'; Muir 75'	Attendance: 1,340; Referee: Salmond

1 February 2011 SFL2	Forfar Athletic	0–0	East Fife	Station Park
		BBC Report		Attendance: 438; Referee: Law

12 February 2011 SFL2	Stenhousemuir	0–2	East Fife	Ochilview Park
		BBC Report	Young 45'; Linn 48'	Attendance: 590; Referee: Norris

15 February 2011 SFL2	East Fife	1–3	Dumbarton	Bayview Stadium
	Park 44'	BBC Report	Walker 17'; Gilhaney 23'; Geggan 55'	Attendance: 392; Referee: Nicholls

19 February 2011 SFL2	East Fife	0–0	Brechin City	Bayview Stadium
		BBC Report		Attendance: 526; Referee: Clancy

23 February 2011 SFL2	Ayr United	0–4	East Fife	Somerset Park
		BBC Report	Hamilton 31'; Wallace 34', 66'; Park 49'	Attendance: 789; Referee: McLean

26 February 2011 SFL2	East Fife	0–1	Airdrie United	Bayview Stadium
		SFL Report	Gemmill 40'	Attendance: 644; Referee: Roache

1 March 2011 SFL2	East Fife	3–1	Peterhead	Bayview Stadium
	Hislop 22'; Linn 32', 54'	BBC Report	Bavidge 73'	Attendance: 314; Referee: Madden

5 March 2011 SFL2	Alloa Athletic	1–3	East Fife	Recreation Park
	McGowan 66' (pen.)	BBC Report	Johnstone 34', 45+5'; Philp 45+3' (o.g.)	Attendance: 579; Referee: Northcroft

8 March 2011 SFL2	Airdrie United	1–1	East Fife	Excelsior Stadium
	Johnston 12'	SFL Report	Smart 22'	Attendance: 447; Referee: Smith

12 March 2011 SFL2	East Fife	3–0	Forfar Athletic	Bayview Stadium
	Hislop 33'; Smart 74'; Linn 88'	BBC Report		Attendance: 469; Referee: Finnie

19 March 2011 SFL2	Dumbarton	4–2	East Fife	Strathclyde Homes Stadium
	Geggan 39'; McShane 51', 77'; Gilhaney 68'	BBC Report	Linn 27'; Johnstone 61'	Attendance: 615; Referee: O'Reilly

26 March 2011 SFL2	East Fife	1– 3	Livingston	Bayview Stadium
15:00	Wallace 60'	BBC Report	Deuchar 27', 70'; Jacobs 80'	Attendance: 707; Referee: Law

29 March 2011 SFL2	East Fife	3–2	Ayr United	Bayview Stadium
	Wallace 15'; Durie 32'; Linn 46'	BBC Report	Moffat 39', 89'	Attendance: 350; Referee: Richmond

2 April 2011 SFL2	Ayr United	1–1	East Fife	Somerset Park
	Trouten 16'	BBC Report	Park 8'	Attendance: 976; Referee: Salmond

9 April 2011 SFL2	Brechin City	1–3	East Fife	Glebe Park
	Moyes 61'	BBC Report	McCulloch 27'; Cook 52' (o.g.); Wallace 71'	Attendance: 504; Referee: Finnie

16 April 2011 SFL2	East Fife	1–1	Stenhousemuir	Bayview Stadium
	Durie 56'	BBC Report	Murray 91'	Attendance: 562; Referee: Watters

19 April 2011 SFL2	Brechin City	2–3	East Fife	Glebe Park
	Redman 54'; Molloy 58' (pen.)	BBC Report	McGowan 52'; Wallace 62' (pen.), 83'	Attendance: 441; Referee: Charleston

23 April 2011 SFL2	Peterhead	0–2	East Fife	Balmoor
		BBC Report	Johnstone 28'; Muir 54'	Attendance: 473; Referee: Hilland

30 April 2011 SFL2	East Fife	3–1	Alloa Athletic	Bayview Stadium
	Wallace 16'; Park 54'; Durie 87'	BBC Report	Motion 61'	Attendance: 846; Referee: Colvin

7 May 2011 SFL2	Airdrie United	2–2	East Fife	Excelsior Stadium
	McCord 41'; Sally 83'	SFL Report	Muir 33'; Hislop 64'	Attendance: 861; Referee: Northcroft

=== Scottish Challenge Cup ===
24 July 2010 Challenge Cup round 1	East Fife	4–3 (a.e.t.)	Brechin City	Bayview Stadium
	Sloan 56' (pen.); Crawford 88'; Eurie 93'; Linn 119'; Bryce (red card) 103'	SFL Report	McAllister 27'; Janczyk 90'; Moyes 101'; Nelson (red card) 55'	Attendance: 497; Referee: Robertson

10 August 2010 Challenge Cup round 2	East Fife	3–1	Stirling Albion	Bayview Stadium
	Byrne 3'; Johnstone 50'; Cargill 90'	SFL Report	Devine 29'	Attendance: 512; Referee: Northcroft

4 September 2010 Challenge Cup QF	Queen of the South	5–0	East Fife	Palmerston Park
	Burns 32', 46', 79'; Ovenstone 64' (o.g.); Harris 90+2'	SFL Report		Attendance: 1,751; Referee: Richmond

=== Scottish League Cup ===
31 July 2010 Scottish League Cup round 1	Raith Rovers	4–1	East Fife	Stark's Park
	Tade 6', 10'; Baird 29'; Mole 73'	BBC Report	Linn 49'	Attendance: 2,187; Referee: McKendrick

=== Scottish Cup ===
20 November 2010 Scottish Cup round 3	East Fife	3–1	Forfar Athletic	Bayview Stadium
	Sloan 24' (pen.); Johnstone 45'; Hislop 47'	BBC Report	Tod 81'	Attendance: 695; Referee: McDermott

8 January 2011 Scottish Cup round 4	Aberdeen	6–0	East Fife	Pittodrie
	Maguire 13', 24', 42'; Vernon 30', 81'; Magennis 90'	BBC Report		Attendance: 6,918; Referee: Salmond

== League table ==
Pos	Team	Pld	W	D	L	GF	GA	GD	Pts	Promotion, qualification or relegation
3	Forfar Athletic	36	17	8	11	50	48	+2	59	Qualification for the First Division play-offs
4	Brechin City	36	15	12	9	63	45	+18	57	Qualification for the First Division play-offs
5	East Fife	36	14	10	12	77	60	+17	52	
6	Airdrie United	36	13	9	14	52	60	−8	48	
7	Dumbarton	36	11	7	18	52	70	−18	40	

Source: SPFL
Rules for classification: 1) points; 2) goal difference; 3) number of goals scored.
