= 2011 Scottish Youth Cup final =

- Event: 2010–11 Scottish Youth Cup
Celtic	Rangers
2	1
- Date: 27 April 2011
- Venue: Hampden Park, Glasgow
- Referee: John Beaton
- Attendance: 9,427

The 2011 Scottish Youth Cup final was the final match of the 2010–11 Scottish Youth Cup, the 27th season of the Scottish Youth Cup. It was played by the U19 sides of Old Firm rivals Celtic and Rangers.

== Route to the Final ==
=== Celtic ===
Round	Opposition	Score
Third Round	Dundee	6–1
Fourth round	Airdrie United	5–1
Quarter-final	Stenhousemuir	4–0
Semi-final	Livingston	3–0

Celtic entered the competition in the third round. They began their campaign against Dundee winning 6–1 at Lennoxtown, thanks to goals from Patrik Twardzik, Callum Bagshaw, Callum McGregor, Stephen O'Donnell and Liam Gormley (2). Celtic then played Airdrie United again at Lennoxtown. Goals by James Keatings, Callum McGregor, Filip Twardzik, Patrik Twardzik and Liam Gormley gave The Bhoys a comfortable 5–1 win. In the quarter-final, Celtic played Stenhousemuir again taking place at Lennoxtown. It took Celtic until the 43rd minute to break the deadlock through James Keatings, the other goals came from Filip Twardzik, Liam Gormley and Bahrudin Atajić therefore Celtic ran out 4–0 winners. Celtic then took on Livingston in the semi-finals, yet another home match, however, this time the match took place at Celtic Park with Celtic running out 3-0 winners courtesy of goals from Filip Twardzik and James Keatings (2).

This Youth Cup final was the 15th in Celtic's history. They had won 10 of them prior to this final, the last in 2010, which means Celtic are the most successful team in the history of the tournament.

=== Rangers ===
Round	Opposition	Score
Third Round	Deveronvale	13–0
Fourth round	Hamilton Academical	3–2
Quarter-final	Ayr United	6–2
Semi-final	Hibernian	1–0

Rangers entered the competition in the third round. They began their campaign against Deveronvale emphatically winning 13–0 at Rangers Training Centre, thanks to goals from Max Wright (4), Kal Naismith (4), Rhys McCabe (3), Robbie Crawford and Darren Cole. Rangers then played Hamilton Academical again at Rangers Training Centre. Goals by Kane Hemmings (2) (1st pen.), and Max Wright gave The Gers a 3-2 win. In the quarter-final, Rangers played Ayr United, this time it was an away match, taking place at Somerset Park. Rangers eventually won 6-2 after being 2-1 down at half-time, scorers for Rangers were Andy Mitchell (2), Kal Naismith, Kyle McAusland, Rhys McCabe and Dylan McGeouch. Rangers then took on Hibernian in the semi-finals, another home match, however, this time the match took place at Ibrox with Rangers running out narrow 1-0 winners courtesy of a goal from Chris Hegarty.

This Youth Cup final was the 13th in Rangers' history. They had won 5 of them prior to this final, the last in 2008, which means Rangers are the second-most successful team in the history of the tournament.

== Match details ==
27 April 2011
19:30

Celtic	2 – 1 (a.e.t.)	Rangers
Spence 71'; Gormley 109'	Celtic FC; Rangers FC; BBC Sport	McCabe 87'

Hampden Park, Glasgow
Attendance: 9,427
Referee: John Beaton

Celtic	Rangers

CELTIC:
GK		(Australia) Nick Feely
RB	45	(Scotland) Lewis Toshney
CB	43	(Scotland) Kieran Brennan
CB		(England) Matty Hughes (c)
LB		(Scotland) Stephen O'Donnell
RM		(Scotland) Callum Bagshaw
CM		(Australia) Jackson Irvine
CM	53	(Czech Republic) Patrik Twardzik	(substituted off) 107'
LM	43	(Scotland) Greig Spence	(substituted off) 82'
CF	56	(Czech Republic) Filip Twardzik
CF		(Scotland) Callum McGregor
Substitutes:
GK		(Scotland) Robbie Thomson
CF		(Scotland) Liam Gormley	(substituted on) 107'
CF	35	(Bosnia and Herzegovina) Bahrudin Atajić	(substituted on) 82'
DF	42	(Scotland) Marcus Fraser
CF	57	(Scotland) Islam Feruz
Manager:
(Scotland) Stephen Frail

RANGERS:
GK	44	(Scotland) Gary Inglis
RB	56	(Scotland) Kyle McAusland
CB	47	(Northern Ireland) Chris Hegarty
CB	45	(Scotland) Darren Cole
LB	80	(Scotland) Robbie McIntyre
RM	62	(Scotland) Adam Hunter
CM	71	(Scotland) Gregor Fotheringham	(substituted off) 50'
CM	46	(Scotland) Gordon Dick	Substituted off
LM	48	(England) Kane Hemmings (c)	Substituted off
CF	51	(Scotland) Rhys McCabe
CF	52	(Scotland) Kal Naismith
Substitutes:
GK	43	(Northern Ireland) Wayne Drummond
MF	50	(Northern Ireland) Andrew Mitchell	Substituted on
MF	54	(Poland) Kamil Wiktorski
MF	70	(Scotland) Robbie Crawford	(substituted on) 50'
DF	63	(Scotland) Ewan McNeil	Substituted on
Manager:
(Scotland) Billy Kirkwood

MATCH OFFICIALS

- Referee: John Beaton
- Assistant Referee 1: Gavin Duncan
- Assistant Referee 2: Steven Reid
- Fourth Official:Barry Cook

MATCH RULES

- 90 minutes
- 30 minutes of extra-time if necessary
- Penalty shoot-out if scores still level
- Five named substitutes
- Maximum of three substitutions
