= 2013–14 Scottish League One =

Scottish League One
- Season: 2013–14
- Champions: Rangers
- Promoted: Rangers
- Relegated: East Fife; Arbroath
- Matches: 169
- Goals: 557 (3.3 per match)
- Top goalscorer: Michael Moffat (25 goals)
- Biggest home win: Rangers 8–0 Stenhousemuir
- Biggest away win: Airdrieonians 0–6 Rangers
- Highest scoring: Stenhousemuir 4–5 Dunfermline Athletic; Ayr United 3–6 Stranraer
- Longest winning run: 15 games Rangers
- Longest unbeaten run: 36 games Rangers
- Longest winless run: 11 games Arbroath
- Longest losing run: 8 games Airdrieonians
- Highest attendance: 45,462; Rangers 1–1 Stranraer (26 December 2013)
- Lowest attendance: 326; Stranraer 1–0 Stenhousemuir (19 October 2013)
- Average attendance: 5,253

The 2013–14 Scottish League One was the 20th season in the current format of 10 teams in the third-tier of Scottish football. This was the first season of the competition being part of the newly formed Scottish Professional Football League after the merger of the Scottish Premier League and the Scottish Football League. Queen of the South were the defending champions.

Rangers were confirmed as champions after a 3–0 home win over Airdrieonians on 12 March 2014. This secured the club's second successive divisional title and promotion to the second tier. This was the earliest anyone had secured a championship title since Partick Thistle won the old First Division in 1975–76. Rangers were presented with the trophy on 26 April after a 3–0 win against Stranraer at Ibrox.

== Teams ==
Location of teams in 2013–14 Scottish League One

Rangers were promoted into the league as 2012–13 Scottish Third Division champions. Airdrieonians were automatically relegated into the league after finishing bottom of the First Division, while Dunfermline were relegated into the league by losing the First Division play-off final to Alloa Athletic, who took their place in the 2013–14 Scottish Championship. Queen of the South were also promoted to the Championship as last season's Second Division champions. East Fife maintained their status in this division by defeating Peterhead in the Second Division play-off final. Peterhead remained in the fourth tier. Albion Rovers were automatically relegated to the fourth tier by finishing bottom of last season's Second Division.

== Stadia and locations ==
Team	Location	Stadium	Capacity
Airdrieonians	Airdrie	Excelsior Stadium	10,170
Arbroath	Arbroath	Gayfield Park	6,600
Ayr United	Ayr	Somerset Park	10,185
Brechin City	Brechin	Glebe Park	3,960
Dunfermline Athletic	Dunfermline	East End Park	11,480
East Fife	Methil	Bayview Stadium	1,980
Forfar Athletic	Forfar	Station Park	6,777
Rangers	Glasgow	Ibrox Stadium	50,987
Stenhousemuir	Stenhousemuir	Ochilview Park	3,746
Stranraer	Stranraer	Stair Park	2,988

== League table ==
Pos	Team	Pld	W	D	L	GF	GA	GD	Pts	Qualification or relegation
1	Rangers (C, P)	36	33	3	0	106	18	+88	102	Promotion to the Championship
2	Dunfermline Athletic	36	19	6	11	68	54	+14	63	Qualification for the Championship play-offs
3	Stranraer	36	14	9	13	57	57	0	51	Qualification for the Championship play-offs
4	Ayr United	36	14	7	15	65	66	−1	49	Qualification for the Championship play-offs
5	Stenhousemuir	36	12	12	12	57	66	−9	48	
6	Airdrieonians	36	12	9	15	47	57	−10	45	
7	Forfar Athletic	36	12	7	17	55	62	−7	43	
8	Brechin City	36	12	6	18	57	71	−14	42	
9	East Fife (R)	36	9	5	22	31	69	−38	32	Qualification for the League One play-offs
10	Arbroath (R)	36	9	4	23	52	75	−23	31	Relegation to League Two

Source: SPFL
Rules for classification: 1) points; 2) goal difference; 3) number of goals scored.
(C) Champions; (P) Promoted; (R) Relegated

== Results ==
Teams play each other four times in this league. In the first half of the season each team plays every other team twice (home and away) and then do the same in the second half of the season, for a total of 36 games

=== First half of season ===
Home \ Away	AIR	ARB	AYR	BRE	DNF	EFI	FOR	RAN	STE	STR
Airdrieonians		2–1	0–1	3–1	0–3	1–3	0–2	0–6	0–1	3–2
Arbroath	3–2		0–3	2–1	0–3	2–2	3–0	0–3	3–4	1–2
Ayr United	2–2	2–0		2–2	2–4	2–0	2–0	0–2	4–3	3–6
Brechin City	4–3	3–1	1–1		1–1	2–0	2–1	3–4	0–1	1–1
Dunfermline Athletic	2–1	2–3	5–1	3–1		1–2	1–1	0–4	3–2	3–1
East Fife	1–0	2–1	1–4	1–3	0–1		1–3	0–4	1–0	1–2
Forfar Athletic	3–3	1–1	0–1	2–0	4–0	2–0		0–1	1–2	1–2
Rangers	2–0	5–1	3–0	4–1	3–1	5–0	6–1		8–0	1–1
Stenhousemuir	1–1	3–2	1–1	3–2	4–5	1–1	1–1	0–2		1–0
Stranraer	3–1	3–2	1–1	3–0	1–2	2–0	0–4	0–3	1–0	

Source: BBC Sport
Legend: Blue = home team win; Yellow = draw; Red = away team win.

=== Second half of season ===
Home \ Away	AIR	ARB	AYR	BRE	DNF	EFI	FOR	RAN	STE	STR
Airdrieonians		2–0	3–0	2–1	2–0	2–1	5–1	0–1	1–1	1–1
Arbroath	0–1		2–3	0–1	1–2	2–1	2–3	1–2	2–1	4–2
Ayr United	3–0	2–1		1–3	1–1	4–1	2–3	0–2	2–3	5–0
Brechin City	1–1	2–4	2–1		3–2	3–0	1–5	1–2	1–3	1–3
Dunfermline Athletic	0–1	3–0	3–0	2–1		1–2	0–0	1–1	0–0	3–2
East Fife	0–0	1–0	0–5	1–2	1–3		2–1	0–1	1–2	1–1
Forfar Athletic	1–1	0–2	4–2	1–1	2–4	1–2		0–2	3–0	1–0
Rangers	3–0	3–2	2–1	2–1	2–0	2–0	3–0		3–3	3–0
Stenhousemuir	1–2	2–2	1–1	4–2	1–2	1–1	4–1	0–4		1–1
Stranraer	1–1	1–1	4–0	1–2	3–1	2–0	3–1	0–2	1–1	

Source: BBC Sport
Legend: Blue = home team win; Yellow = draw; Red = away team win.

== League One play-offs ==
=== Semi-finals ===
==== First leg ====
7 May 2014
19:45

Clyde	1–0	East Fife
Ferguson 38'	Report

Broadwood Stadium, Cumbernauld
Attendance: 1,005
Referee: Euan Anderson

7 May 2014
19:45

Stirling Albion	3–1	Annan Athletic
Weir 12'; Weatherston 26', 30'	Report	Hopkirk 70'

Forthbank Stadium, Stirling
Attendance: 972
Referee: Greg Aitken

==== Second leg ====
10 May 2014
14:00

East Fife	2–1 (a.e.t.)	Clyde
McBride 12'; Smith 85'	Report	Ferguson 45'
Penalties
Buchanan (penalty scored); Campbell (penalty scored); Brown (penalty missed); Mbu (penalty scored); McBride (penalty missed); Cowan (penalty scored); Austin (penalty scored); Johnstone (penalty scored); Smith (penalty missed); Hughes (penalty scored)	7–6	(penalty scored) Sweeney; (penalty scored) Watt; (penalty scored) MacDonald; (penalty missed) Ferguson; (penalty missed) McCluskey; (penalty scored) Capuano; (penalty scored) Marsh; (penalty scored) McQueen; (penalty missed) Daly; (penalty missed) McGhee

Bayview Stadium, Methil
Attendance: 1,018
Referee: Brian Colvin

2–2 on aggregate. East Fife won 7–6 on penalties.

10 May 2014
15:00

Annan Athletic	3–5	Stirling Albion
McNiff 40'; Love 50'; Davidson 90+2'	Report	McClune 9'; White 23', 79', 83'; Comrie 56'

Galabank, Annan
Attendance: 912
Referee: George Salmond

Stirling Albion won 8–4 on aggregate.

=== Final ===
==== First leg ====
14 May 2014
19:45

Stirling Albion	1–2	East Fife
Forsyth 42'	Report	McBride 70'; Austin 89'

Forthbank Stadium, Stirling
Attendance: 1,501
Referee: Craig Charleston

==== Second leg ====
18 May 2014
15:00

East Fife	0–2	Stirling Albion
	Report	White 74'; Cunningham 81'

Bayview Stadium, Methil
Attendance: 1,516
Referee: Calum Murray

Stirling Albion won 3–2 on aggregate.

== Top scorers ==
As of 19 April 2014.

Scorer	Rank	Club	Goals
1	(Scotland) Michael Moffat	Ayr United	25
2	(Republic of Ireland) Jon Daly	Rangers	20
3	(Scotland) Lee McCulloch	Rangers	17
4	(Scotland) Jamie Longworth	Stranraer	14
5	(Scotland) Martin Grehan	Stranraer	13
6	(Scotland) Alan Cook	Arbroath	12
7	(Scotland) Andrew Jackson	Brechin City	11
8	(Scotland) Liam Buchanan	East Fife	10
8	(Scotland) Dale Hilson	Forfar Athletic	10
8	(Scotland) Paul McManus	Arbroath	10
8	(Scotland) Gavin Swankie	Forfar Athletic	10
8	(Scotland) Alan Trouten	Brechin City	10
8	(Scotland) Ryan Wallace	Dunfermline Athletic	10
