= 2009–10 Raith Rovers F.C. season =

Raith Rovers
2009–10 season

Raith Rovers competed in the Scottish First Division, Scottish Cup, Scottish League Cup, Scottish Challenge Cup & the Fife Cup during the 2009–10 season.

== Results and fixtures ==
*Note: Musselburgh Athletic, Cupar Hearts, Tynecastle, Civil Service Strollers & Whitehill Welfare friendlies were a Raith XI.

Date	Venue	Opponents	Score	Competition	Raith Rovers scorer(s)	Match Report
11 July 2009	Stark's Park	Airdrie United	2–0	F	Williamson (2)	Raith Rovers Official Site
14 July 2009	Stark's Park	Norwich City	0–1	F		Raith Rovers Official Site
18 July 2009	Ainslie Park	Hamilton Academical	2–2 (1-4 on penalties)	Spartans Tournament	Williamson (2, 2nd pen)	Raith Rovers Official Site
19 July 2009	Ainslie Park	Blyth Spartans	4–2	Spartans Tournament	Bryce (2), Ferry, Walker	Raith Rovers Official Site
21 July 2009	Stark's Park	Hibernian	1–0 (Match abandoned)	F	Williamson	Raith Rovers Official Site
22 July 2009	Olivebank Stadium	Musselburgh Athletic	0–1	F		Raith Rovers Official Site
25 July 2009	Forthbank Stadium	Stirling Albion	1–2	SCC	Walker	Raith Rovers Official Site
26 July 2009	Duffus Park	Cupar Hearts	7–3	F	McKechnie (3), Mackie (2), Elder, Bryce	Raith Rovers Official Site
28 July 2009	Stark's Park	Kilmarnock	1–1	F	Bryce	Raith Rovers Official Site
29 July 2009	Peffermill	Tynecastle	2–0	F	Mackie, Beveridge	Raith Rovers Official Site
1 August 2009	Bayview Stadium	East Fife	3–2	SLC	Walker, Tadé, Williamson	Raith Rovers Official Site
2 August 2009	Muirhouse	Civil Service Strollers	3–1	F	Bryce, Mackie (pen.), Trialist	Raith Rovers Official Site
5 August 2009	Ferguson Park	Whitehill Welfare	2–2	F	Bryce, Trialist	The Scotsman (No official site reports from either side)
8 August 2009	Palmerston Park	Queen of the South	1–1	First Division	Walker	Raith Rovers Official Site
15 August 2009	Stark's Park	Dundee	2–2	First Division	Williamson, Ellis	Raith Rovers Official Site
22 August 2009	Victoria Park	Ross County	1–0	First Division	Hill	Raith Rovers Official Site
26 August 2009	East End Park	Dunfermline Athletic	1–3	SLC	Williamson (pen.)	Raith Rovers Official Site
29 August 2009	East End Park	Dunfermline Athletic	2–0	First Division	Murray, Casalinuovo	Raith Rovers Official Site
3 September 2009	Central Park	Cowdenbeath	1–1 (3-4 on penalties)	Fife Cup	Ferry	Raith Rovers Official Site
12 September 2009	Stark's Park	Partick Thistle	1–1	First Division	Casalinuovo	Raith Rovers Official Site
19 September 2009	Stark's Park	Greenock Morton	3–0	First Division	Tadé (2), Ferry	Raith Rovers Official Site
26 September 2009	Somerset Park	Ayr United	0–1	First Division		Raith Rovers Official Site
10 October 2009	Excelsior Stadium	Airdrie United	2–1	First Division	Williamson, Davidson	Raith Rovers Official Site
13 October 2009	Stark's Park	Inverness CT	0–1	First Division		Raith Rovers Official Site
17 October 2009	Stark's Park	Queen of the South	1–0	First Division	Russell	Raith Rovers Official Site
24 October 2009	Dens Park	Dundee	1–2	First Division	Smith	Raith Rovers Official Site
31 October 2009	Firhill Stadium	Partick Thistle	2–1	First Division	Wallace, Sloan	Raith Rovers Official Site
7 November 2009	Stark's Park	Dunfermline Athletic	1–2	First Division	Campbell	Raith Rovers Official Site
14 November 2009	Cappielow	Greenock Morton	0–5	First Division		Raith Rovers Official Site
21 November 2009	Stark's Park	Ayr United	0–0	First Division		Raith Rovers Official Site
28 November 2009	Stark's Park	Peterhead	0–0	SC		Raith Rovers Official Site
1 December 2009	Balmoor	Peterhead	4–1	SC	D.Smith (2), K.Smith, Simmons	Raith Rovers Official Site
12 December 2009	Caledonian Stadium	Inverness CT	0–1	First Division		Raith Rovers Official Site
15 December 2009	Stark's Park	Airdrie United	1–1	First Division	Amaya	Raith Rovers Official Site
16 January 2010	Stark's Park	Partick Thistle	1–0	First Division	K.Smith	Raith Rovers Official Site
23 January 2010	Stark's Park	Greenock Morton	1–2	First Division	K.Smith (pen.)	Raith Rovers Official Site
25 January 2010	Stark's Park	Airdrie United	1–1	SC	Smyth (o.g.)	Raith Rovers Official Site
27 January 2010	Excelsior Stadium	Airdrie United	3–1	SC	K.Smith, Tadé, Russell (pen.)	Raith Rovers Official Site
6 February 2010	Stark's Park	Aberdeen	1–1	SC	Williamson	Raith Rovers Official Site
13 February 2010	Stark's Park	Inverness CT	0–4	First Division		Raith Rovers Official Site
16 February 2010	Pittodrie Stadium	Aberdeen	1–0	SC	Tadé	Raith Rovers Official Site
6 March 2010	Victoria Park	Ross County	0–1	First Division		Raith Rovers Official Site
9 March 2010	Stark's Park	Ross County	2–1	First Division	Walker, Tadé	Raith Rovers Official Site
13 March 2010	Dens Park	Dundee	2–1	SC	Simmons, Ellis	Raith Rovers Official Site
16 March 2010	East End Park	Dunfermline Athletic	1–2	First Division	Walker	Raith Rovers Official Site
20 March 2010	Stark's Park	Dunfermline Athletic	1–2	First Division	Tadé	Raith Rovers Official Site
23 March 2010	Cappielow	Greenock Morton	1–1	First Division	Murray	Raith Rovers Official Site
27 March 2010	Stark's Park	Ayr United	1–1	First Division	Simmons	Raith Rovers Official Site
3 April 2010	Caledonian Stadium	Inverness CT	3–4	First Division	Williamson, Tadé, Mole	Raith Rovers Official Site
7 April 2010	Somerset Park	Ayr United	2–0	First Division	Murray, Williamson	Raith Rovers Official Site
11 April 2010	Hampden Park	Dundee United	0–2	SC		Raith Rovers Official Site
14 April 2010	Excelsior Stadium	Airdrie United	0–3	First Division		Raith Rovers Official Site
17 April 2010	Palmerston Park	Queen of the South	0–3	First Division		Raith Rovers Official Site
19 April 2010	Firhill Stadium	Partick Thistle	0–0	First Division		Raith Rovers Official Site
21 April 2010	Stark's Park	Dundee	1–0	First Division	Hill	Raith Rovers Official Site
24 April 2010	Dens Park	Dundee	0–2	First Division		Raith Rovers Official Site
26 April 2010	Stark's Park	Airdrie United	0–1	First Division		Raith Rovers Official Site
28 April 2010	Stark's Park	Queen of the South	0–0	First Division		Raith Rovers Official Site
1 May 2010	Stark's Park	Ross County	4–1	First Division	Armstrong, Russell (3)	Raith Rovers Official Site

== League table ==
Pos	Team	Pld	W	D	L	GF	GA	GD	Pts	Promotion, qualification or relegation
5	Ross County	36	15	11	10	46	44	+2	56	
6	Partick Thistle	36	14	6	16	43	40	+3	48	
7	Raith Rovers	36	11	9	16	36	47	−11	42	
8	Greenock Morton	36	11	4	21	40	65	−25	37	
9	Airdrie United (R)	36	8	9	19	41	56	−15	33	Qualification to the First Division play-offs

Source: Scottish Football League
Rules for classification: 1) points; 2) goal difference; 3) number of goals scored.
First Division play-offs: The 9th place team will be entered into a play-off with the 2nd, 3rd and 4th places of the Second Division. The winner gets a place in the 2010-11 First Division
(R) Relegated
