= Russell-Brown =

Russell-Brown is a surname. Notable people with the surname include:

- Anna Claudia Russell-Brown (1911–2006), English-Canadian singer and comedian
- Claude Russell-Brown (1873–1939), Canadian tennis player
- Katheryn Russell-Brown (born 1961), American social scientist and children's author

== See also ==
- Russell Brown (disambiguation)
