= Bobby Linn =

Scottish footballer

Personal information
- Full name: Robert Linn
- Date of birth: 10 October 1985 (age 41)
- Place of birth: Dundee, Scotland
- Height: 5 ft 7 in (1.70 m)
- Position: Winger

Team information
- Current team: Dundee North End

Youth career
- Dundee

Senior career*
Years	Team	Apps	(Gls)
2003–2004	Dundee	13	(0)
2004–2007	Peterhead	83	(28)
2007–2008	Greenock Morton	19	(2)
2007	→ East Fife (loan)	10	(3)
2008–2012	East Fife	155	(35)
2012–2013	Ballingry Rovers		
2013–2023	Arbroath	301	(73)
2023–2025	Lochee United		
2025–	Dundee North End	0	(0)
- * Club domestic league appearances and goals as of 19:03, 25 June 2023 (UTC)

Robert Linn (born 10 October 1985) is a Scottish footballer who plays as a winger for Midlands League club Dundee North End. Linn started his career with Dundee before signing for Peterhead. He then moved to Greenock Morton, from whom he joined East Fife, initially on loan. After spending a year in the Juniors with Ballingry Rovers, Linn signed for Arbroath in June 2013, and would spend a decade with the club which would include a rise from 9th in the Scottish League Two to coming 2nd in the Scottish Championship.

== Career ==
Linn began his career with Dundee, making his debut as a substitute for Fabián Caballero in a 1–0 win against Partick Thistle in the Scottish Premier League on 18 October 2003, with his first goal coming on 3 December 2003, the winning goal in extra-time in a 1–0 win against Hearts in the Scottish League Cup. On 22 September 2004, Linn left Dundee after having his contract terminated by mutual consent with the club growing increasingly frustrated with Linn's behaviour and attitude problems. He had previously been banished from the first team squad for two months due to repeatedly missing training, however, this banishement failed to serve its purpose and Linn's off-field antics continued, eventually leading to termination of his contract and consigning Linn to a career in the lower leagues.

Linn then signed for Peterhead of the Scottish Third Division in October 2004. In Peterhead's match against Stranraer on 15 September 2006, he scored four goals in a 5–2 victory, and went on to win the Scottish Football League Player of the Month award for September.

On 6 January 2007, Linn signed for Greenock Morton on a two-and-a-half-year contract. He made his debut from the bench, at home to Alloa Athletic on 13 January 2007.

In October 2007, having not featured regularly for Morton in the early matches of the season, Linn was loaned to East Fife for the remainder of the season, although it was then discovered that the rules only allowed the loan to last for three months. He scored on his debut as a substitute in a 4–0 win against Albion Rovers. Linn signed permanently for East Fife on 2 January 2008.

Ahead of the 2012–13 season, Linn dropped down to the Junior Leagues signing for Ballingry Rovers.

In June 2013, Arbroath manager Paul Sheerin signed Linn on a one-year contract and he was rewarded for his early season form with a new two-year deal halfway through the 2013–14 season. Linn was named SPFL Player of the Year and PFA Scotland Players' Player of the Year in Scottish League One for the 2018–2019 season after scoring 23 goals, helping Arbroath clinch the League One title. After a decade-long stint with the Lichties which included a close fight for the 2021–22 Scottish Championship title, Linn announced he would leave following the end of his contract in June 2023, and would be named by Arbroath as a "once in a lifetime iconic legend" for the club.

=== Lochee United ===
On 25 June 2023, Linn joined Midlands League club Lochee United on a two-year deal.

== Personal life ==
Linn works as a refuse collector.

In 2004, Linn was sacked by his club, Dundee F.C., due to repeated off-field behavioural and attitude problems. Dundee F.C. manager, Jim Duffy stated, "I know we are short in terms of squad numbers, but if a player makes it clear he doesn't want to be part of the club then it is best we let him go"

Rumours about Linn's off-field activities circulated throughout his career, with many clubs put-off the idea of signing the Arbroath F.C. legend due to his perceived unreliability and fondness for socialising.

In 2022, Linn was discovered to have made a bogus compensation claim in an attempt to dishonestly profit from a traffic incident. After a minor car crash, Linn claimed to have suffered from whiplash and soft tissue injuries to his neck with the pain and restrictions having lasted for a month. In his claim, his occupation as a binman was recorded, but in every document produced Linn omitted to mention that he was also a footballer and had continued to play without restriction. He was forced to drop his claim after a specialist investigations team found extensive social media footage and press reporting of the 36-year-old playing for the then Scottish League One leaders, Arbroath. If he had continued with his deception, it would have forced Linn to perjure himself in a courtroom. Steven Smart, Partner at Horwich Farrelly, added: "In the English and Welsh courts, such behaviour is called fundamental dishonesty and the claim would have been dismissed at an early stage.

== Career statistics ==
As of 5 May 2023

Appearances and goals by club, season and competition
Club	Season	League			Scottish Cup		League Cup		Other		Total	
Club	Season	Division	Apps	Goals	Apps	Goals	Apps	Goals	Apps	Goals	Apps	Goals
Dundee	2003–04	Scottish Premier League	13	0	1	0	2	1	0	0	16	1
Dundee	2004–05	Scottish Premier League	0	0	0	0	0	0	0	0	0	0
Dundee	Total		13	0	1	0	2	1	0	0	16	1
Peterhead	2004–05	Scottish Third Division	27	6	1	0	0	0	0	0	28	6
Peterhead	2005–06	Scottish Second Division	36	12	2	1	2	1	5 (Note: One appearance in the Scottish Challenge Cup and four appearances in the Scottish First Division play-offs)	0	45	14
Peterhead	2006–07	Scottish Second Division	20	10	1	0	2	1	1 (Note: Appearances in the Scottish Challenge Cup)	0	24	11
Peterhead	Total		83	28	4	1	4	2	6	0	97	31
Greenock Morton	2006–07	Scottish Second Division	16	2	0	0	0	0	0	0	16	2
Greenock Morton	2007–08	Scottish First Division	3	0	0	0	0	0	4	1	7	1
Greenock Morton	Total		19	2	0	0	0	0	4	1	23	3
East Fife (loan)	2007–08	Scottish Third Division	10	3	3	0	0	0	0	0	13	3
East Fife	2007–08	Scottish Third Division	18	3	0	0	0	0	0	0	18	3
East Fife	2008–09	Scottish Second Division	34	6	3	1	0	0	1	0	38	7
East Fife	2009–10	Scottish Second Division	33	6	1	0	1	1	1	0	36	7
East Fife	2010–11	Scottish Second Division	35	13	2	0	1	1	3	1	41	15
East Fife	2011–12	Scottish Second Division	35	7	2	1	4	1	3	1	44	10
East Fife	Total		155	35	8	2	6	3	8	2	177	42
Arbroath	2013–14	Scottish League One	36	6	1	0	1	0	1	1	39	7
Arbroath	2014–15	Scottish League Two	36	13	5	0	1	0	3 (Note: One appearance in the Scottish Challenge Cup and two appearances in the Scottish League One play-offs)	0	45	13
Arbroath	2015–16	Scottish League Two	33	11	3	2	1	0	1	0	38	13
Arbroath	2016–17	Scottish League Two	36	5	2	1	4	0	2	0	44	6
Arbroath	2017–18	Scottish League One	30	6	2	0	3	0	3 (Note: One appearance in the Scottish Challenge Cup and two appearances and one goal in the Scottish Championship play-offs)	1	38	7
Arbroath	2018–19	Scottish League One	32	21	1	0	2	1	3	1	38	23
Arbroath	2019–20	Scottish Championship	23	6	3	1	4	1	2	0	32	8
Arbroath	2020–21	Scottish Championship	19	1	1	0	5	0	0	0	25	1
Arbroath	2021–22	Scottish Championship	23	1	2	0	5	0	1 (Note: One appearance in the Scottish Premiership play-offs)	0	31	1
Arbroath	2022–23	Scottish Championship	33	3	2	2	5	2	2	0	42	7
Arbroath	Total		301	73	22	6	31	4	18	3	372	86
Career total			581	141	38	9	43	10	36	6	698	166

== Honours ==
Greenock Morton

- Scottish League Second Division: 2006–07

East Fife

- Scottish League Third Division: 2007–08

Arbroath

- Scottish League Two: 2016–17
- Scottish League One: 2018–19

Individual

- Scottish Football League Young Player of the Month: October 2005
- Scottish Football League Player of the Month: September 2006
- Scottish League Two Player of the Month: September 2015
- Scottish League One Player of the Month: September 2018
- SPFL Scottish League One Player of the Year: 2018–19
- PFA Scotland Scottish League Two Players' Player of the Year: 2014–15
- PFA Scotland Scottish League One Players' Player of the Year: 2018–19
- PFA Scotland Scottish League Two Team of the Year: 2014–15, 2015–16, 2016–17
- PFA Scotland Scottish League One Team of the Year: 2018–19
