= Russell Brown =

Russell or Russel or Russ, named Brown may refer to:

== Entertainment ==
- Russ Brown (actor) (1892–1964, Russell Brown), American actor
- Russell Brown (author), Australian author
- L. Russell Brown (born 1940), American lyricist
- Russell Brown (director), American filmmaker

== Politics ==
- Russell Brown (British politician) (born 1951), Scottish Labour Party politician
- Russell Brown (Canadian politician) (1911–1971), politician in Saskatchewan, Canada
- Russell P. Brown (1891–1965), American banker and member of the Massachusetts House of Representatives

== Other ==
- Russel Brown (1900–1988), Anglican bishop in Canada
- Russell A. Brown (born 1952), American physician and computer scientist
- Russell Brown (judge) (born 1965), Canadian jurist named to the Supreme Court of Canada
- Russell Brown (media commentator) (born 1962), New Zealand media commentator
- Russell Wolf Brown (born 1985), American middle-distance runner

== Fictional characters ==
- Russell Brown, in the Irish TV soap opera Fair City, played by Conor Delaney

== See also ==
- Ross Brown (disambiguation)
