= Rob Ogleby =

English footballer

Robert Ogleby
Personal information
- Full name: Robert Charles Ogleby
- Date of birth: 5 January 1992 (age 34)
- Place of birth: Coventry, England
- Height: 1.86 m (6 ft 1 in)
- Position: Striker

Youth career
- Coventry City
- 2010–2011: Heart of Midlothian

Senior career*
Years	Team	Apps	(Gls)
2011–2012	Heart of Midlothian	0	(0)
2011–2012	→ East Fife (loan)	14	(2)
2012–2014	Wrexham	53	(12)
2014–2015	Livingston	12	(0)
2015	Nuneaton Town	13	(1)
2015–2016	Leamington	31	(5)
2016	Wingate & Finchley	6	(1)
2018	Weirside Rangers	1	(1)

International career^{‡}
2010–2014	Wales U21	12	(2)
- * Club domestic league appearances and goals as of 27 September 2016 (UTC) ‡ National team caps and goals as of 15:27, 5 March 2014 (UTC)

Robert Charles Ogleby (born 5 January 1992) is a footballer, who last played for Wingate & Finchley as a striker. Although born in England, he has played internationally for Wales. He has previously played for Heart of Midlothian, East Fife and Wrexham. Rob played and scored in a 5–3 loss for local amateur team Weirside Rangers 2 years after retiring from professional football. He was a scout for Wrexham, before leaving for a career in non-sporting recruitment.

== Career ==
=== Hearts ===
Ogleby was with Coventry City as a youth, but was released by them after two years. He signed for Heart of Midlothian (Hearts) in 2010 and initially played for their under 19 squad. He was promoted to the first team on the final day of the 2010–11 season, but did not make an appearance in the match against Dundee United.

At the start of the 2011–12 season, Ogleby was sent on loan to East Fife to gain first team experience. On his return to Hearts he went on trial with Falkirk with a view to a further loan. The loan deal never materialised and on 31 January 2012 he negotiated early release from his Hearts contract.

=== East Fife (loan) ===
Having yet to break into the Hearts first team Ogleby joined East Fife on loan on a six-month deal in July 2011. Making his debut in a friendly against parent club Hearts. On 23 July 2011 in his first competitive start for the club he scored a hat trick against Montrose in East Fife's 6–1 win in the Challenge Cup. He went on to make his league debut on 6 August against Stirling. Due to match call off's in December, appearances were limited and his last game came on 2 January against Cowdenbeath. In all he made 19 appearances in all competitions scoring 8 times before returning to Hearts.

=== Wrexham ===
After his release from his Hearts contract he joined Conference National side Wrexham on a 3-month deal. He was given the number 31 shirt. He made his debut as a substitute on 14 March, in a 5–0 win over Ebbsfleet. Ogleby was given a new contract at Wrexham ahead of the 2012/13 and given the number 15 shirt, he played a large part in Wrexham's pre-season matches, He scored goals in games against Aberystwyth, Kilmarnock, Bala Town and Coventry City. In the opening game of the 2012/13 Conference season Ogleby scored Wrexham's first goal of the League campaign with a superb goal at the Racecourse against Woking in a 3–1 victory. He picked up his first career honour in March 2013 winning the FA Trophy with the North Wales club. Ogelby scored the winning goal with his first touch of the game after coming on as an 82nd-minute substitute in Wrexham's opening day 2–1 win over Welling United. Ogleby also scored both goals in a 2–0 win for Wrexham against Hyde FC as they advanced to the 1st round proper of the 2013–14 FA Cup. On 28 December 2013 Ogleby scored a hat trick against Hyde this time in a 5–2 win at Ewan Fields, in the league. On 1 May 2014, Ogleby was released by Wrexham.

=== Livingston ===
Ogleby signed for Livingston in July 2014.

=== Nuneaton Town ===
In January 2015, Ogleby joined Nuneaton Town. He made his debut on 17 January 2015 in a 0–2 home loss to Gateshead. He scored his first goal on 7 February 2015 in a 4–0 home win over Football League Championship side Wolverhampton Wanderers.

=== Leamington ===
On 22 May 2015 it was announced that Ogleby had signed with Southern League outfit Leamington F.C.

== International career ==
He made his debut for Wales U21 on 27 November 2010 against Austria. He went on to appear against Northern Ireland on 9 January scoring in only his second appearance. He scored his second goal in the 89th minute of 3–0 win over Iceland on 6 February 2013.

== Career honours ==
- Wrexham
  - FA Trophy 2012-13

== Career statistics ==
As of match played 30 April 2017.

Club	Season	League			National Cup		League Cup		Other		Total	
Club	Season	Division	Apps	Goals	Apps	Goals	Apps	Goals	Apps	Goals	Apps	Goals
Heart of Midlothian	2010–11	Scottish Premier League	0	0	0	0	0	0	—		0	0
East Fife (loan)	2011–12	Scottish Second Division	14	2	1	2	3	1	1 (Note: Appearance(s) in Scottish Challenge Cup)	3	19	8
Wrexham	2011–12	Conference Premier	6	1	0	0	—		0	0	6	1
Wrexham	2012–13	Conference Premier	26	6	1	0	—		6 (Note: Appearance(s) in FA Trophy)	1	33	7
Wrexham	2013–14	Conference Premier	33	6	3	2	—		1	0	37	8
Wrexham	Total		65	13	4	2	—		7	1	76	16
Livingston	2014–15	Scottish Championship	12	0	0	0	2	0	2	0	16	0
Nuneaton Town	2014–15	Conference Premier	13	1	0	0	—		0	0	13	1
Leamington	2015–16	Southern League Premier Division	31	5	0	0	—		10 (Note: Three appearances and three goals in Southern League Cup, six appearances and two goals in FA Trophy, one appearance in Southern League Premier Division play-offs)	5	41	10
Wingate & Finchley	2016–17	Isthmian League Premier Division	6	1	2	1	—		0	0	8	2
Career total			141	22	7	5	5	1	20	9	173	37
