= 2010–11 Scottish Youth Cup =

SFA Youth Cup

Tournament details
- Country: Scotland
- Teams: 56

Final positions
- Champions: Celtic
- Runners-up: Rangers

Tournament statistics
- Matches played: 55

The 2010–11 Scottish Youth Cup is the 28th season of Scotland's annual competition run by Scottish Football Association. The holders Celtic defeated Rangers 2–0 in last season's final.

== Calendar ==
Round	Match date	Fixtures	Clubs
First Round	Sunday 12 September 2010	8	56 → 48
Second Round	Sunday 10 October	16	48 → 32
Third Round	Sunday 7 November 2010	16	32 → 16
Fourth Round	Sunday 16 January 2011	8	16 → 8
Quarter-finals	Sunday 13 February 2011	4	8 → 4
Semi-finals	Sunday 27 March 2011	2	4 → 2
Final	Wednesday 27 April 2011	1	2 → 1

== Format ==
- First Round - 40 teams are divided geographically. 19 teams go into the Central Group, 10 into the North Group and 11 into the South Group. In this groups teams are played respectively only 3, 2 and 3 matches, while rest of teams go straight into the second round as byes.
- Second Round - 8 winners of the first round join 24 teams, who did not play in the previous round.
- Third Round - 16 winners of the second round join 16 seeded teams, who started at this stage.
- Fourth Round - 16 winners of the third round.
- Quarter-finals - 8 winners of the fourth round.
- Semi-finals - 4 winners of the quarter-finals.
- Final - 2 winners of the semi-finals.

== Fixtures & results ==
=== First round ===
The first-round draw was conducted on 1 September 2010.

==== Central Group ====
Alloa Athletic, Arbroath, Civil Service Strollers, Clyde, Dumbarton, Edinburgh, Greenock Morton, Montrose, Motherwell, Partick Thistle, Raith Rovers, Spartans, Stirling Albion receive byes into the second round.

Home team	Score	Away team
Berwick Rangers	walkover	Stenhousemuir
East Stirlingshire	0–6	Hamilton Academical
East Fife	3–1	Brechin City

Source: https://www.bbc.co.uk/sport/football/scottish-cup

==== North Group ====
Cove Rangers, Deveronvale, Elgin City, Fraserburgh, Inverness Caledonian Thistle, Peterhead receive byes into the second round.

Home team	Score	Away team
Clachnacuddin	4–8	Keith
Aberdeen	16–0	Huntly

Source: https://www.bbc.co.uk/sport/football/scottish-cup

==== South Group ====
Ayr United, Coldstream, Gala Fairydean, Newton Stewart, St Cuthbert Wanderers receive byes into the second round.

Home team	Score	Away team
Queen of the South	1–2 (a.e.t.)	Kilmarnock
Annan Athletic	4–2	Dalbeattie Star
Stranraer	walkover	Threave Rovers

Source: https://www.bbc.co.uk/sport/football/scottish-cup

=== Second round ===
The second-round draw was conducted on 15 September 2010.

==== Central Group ====
Home team	Score	Away team
Alloa Athletic	0 - 3	Raith Rovers
Dumbarton	3 - 2	East Fife
Motherwell	3 - 0	Stirling Albion
Greenock Morton	2 - 5	Stenhousemuir
Spartans	2 - 3	Montrose
Partick Thistle	7 - 0	Civil Service Strollers
Edinburgh City	0 - 7	Hamilton Academical
Arbroath	1 - 3	Clyde

Source: https://www.bbc.co.uk/sport/football/scottish-cup

==== North Group ====
Home team	Score	Away team
Deveronvale	2 - 0	Fraserburgh
Inverness Caledonian Thistle	1 - 2	Keith
Cove Rangers	2 - 3	Elgin City
Peterhead	1 - 3	Aberdeen

Source: https://www.bbc.co.uk/sport/football/scottish-cup

==== South Group ====
Home team	Score	Away team
Gala Fairydean	1 - 3	Annan Athletic
Kilmarnock	18 - 0	St Cuthbert Wanderers
Ayr United	1 - 0	Stranraer
Newton Stewart	1 - 6	Coldstream

Source: https://www.bbc.co.uk/sport/football/scottish-cup

=== Third round ===
The third-round draw was conducted on 21 October 2010.

Home team	Score	Away team
St Mirren	1 - 0	Partick Thistle
St Johnstone	1 - 4	Aberdeen
Falkirk	4 - 2 (a.e.t.)	Dunfermline Athletic
Kilmarnock	4 - 6 (a.e.t.)	Airdrie United
Ayr United	4 - 2	Annan Athletic
Rangers	13 - 0	Deveronvale
Dumbarton	2 - 2 (a.e.t.); 12 - 13 (pen.)	Coldstream
Livingston	1 - 0	Motherwell
Hibernian	12 - 0	Brora Rangers
Ross County	0 - 4	Raith Rovers
Celtic	6 - 1	Dundee
Hamilton Academical	2 - 1	Queen's Park
Heart of Midlothian	4 - 0	Dundee United
Elgin City	0 - 8	Stenhousemuir
Cowdenbeath	1 - 3	Clyde
Montrose	5 - 1	Keith

Source: https://www.bbc.co.uk/sport/football/scottish-cup

=== Fourth round ===
The fourth-round draw was conducted on 12 November 2010.

Home team	Score	Away team
Ayr United	2 - 0	Clyde
Rangers	3 - 2	Hamilton Academical
Celtic	5 - 1	Airdrie United
Stenhousemuir	4 - 3	Montrose
Heart of Midlothian	0 - 1	Hibernian
Coldstream	0 - 9	Livingston
Falkirk	2 - 1	Raith Rovers
Aberdeen	1 - 0	St Mirren

Source: https://www.bbc.co.uk/sport/football/scottish-cup

=== Quarter-finals ===
The quarter-finals draw was conducted on 27 January 2011.

Home team	Score	Away team
Celtic	4 - 0	Stenhousemuir
Hibernian	2 - 1 (a.e.t.)	Falkirk
Ayr United	2 - 6	Rangers
Aberdeen	2 - 4	Livingston

Source: https://www.bbc.co.uk/sport/football/scottish-cup

=== Semi-finals ===
The semi-finals draw was conducted after Quarter-finals matches.

26 March 2011

Rangers	1 – 0	Hibernian
Chris Hegarty 13'	Scottish FA

Ibrox Stadium, Glasgow

27 March 2011

Celtic	3 – 0	Livingston
Filip Twardzik 68'; James Keatings 75', 80'	Scottish FA

Celtic Park, Glasgow

=== Final ===
27 April 2011
19:30

Celtic	2 – 1 (a.e.t.)	Rangers
Greig Spence 71'; Liam Gormley 109'	Celtic FC; Rangers FC; BBC Sport	87' Rhys McCabe

Hampden Park, Glasgow
Attendance: 9,427
Referee: John Beaton
