= Scott McBride =

Scottish footballer (born 1989)

Personal information
- Date of birth: 19 September 1989 (age 37)
- Place of birth: Kirkcaldy, Scotland
- Position: Winger

Youth career
- 2007: Dunfermline Athletic

Senior career*
| Years | Team | Apps | (Gls) |
| 2007–2010 | Dunfermline Athletic | 3 | (0) |
| 2008 | → Arbroath (loan) | 12 | (2) |
| 2009–2010 | → Cowdenbeath | 15 | (6) |
| 2010 | Cowdenbeath | 10 | (0) |
| 2010–2012 | Raith Rovers | 28 | (0) |
| 2012–2014 | East Fife | 49 | (12) |
| 2014–2015 | Arbroath | 28 | (3) |
| 2015–2017 | Albion Rovers | 59 | (10) |
| 2017–2018 | Forfar Athletic | 6 | (0) |
| 2018–2019 | East Fife | 11 | (0) |
| 2019–2020 | Kelty Hearts | 11 | (0) |
| Total | | 232 | (33) |
- * Club domestic league appearances and goals

Scott McBride (born 19 September 1989) is a Scottish former professional footballer. He began his career at Dunfermline, spending time on loan at Arbroath and Cowdenbeath. He then joined Cowdenbeath permanently and from there had spells with Raith Rovers, East Fife X2, Arbroath, Kelty Hearts and Albion Rovers.

== Career ==
Born in Kirkcaldy, McBride started his career with Dunfermline Athletic. He made his début in September 2007, against Scottish Premier League opponents Heart of Midlothian in the Scottish League Cup. In February 2008, McBride signed on loan with Scottish Third Division side Arbroath until the end of the 2007–08 season.

In July 2009, McBride was loaned out to Cowdenbeath. and on 29 January 2010, made the move permanent. On 9 June 2010, McBride signed for Raith Rovers on a full-time contract. On 16 May 2012, Raith announced he was among a list of players being given a free transfer. On 7 July 2012, McBride signed for East Fife. On 18 June 2013, he signed on for a second season with the Fife club. On 21 May 2014, he was named as one of the players to have left East Fife at the end of the season.

In June 2014, McBride signed for Arbroath for a second time. After one season with Arbroath, McBride signed with newly promoted Scottish League One side Albion Rovers in June 2015. He made his debut against Peterhead and scored his first goal against Stranraer. McBride spent two seasons with the Cliftonhill club before signed for Forfar Athletic on 3 June 2017.

McBride signed for Kelty Hearts in January 2019 after his second spell with East Fife.

== Career statistics ==
As of match played 28 October 2017

Appearances and goals by club, season and competition
| Club | Season | League | | | Scottish Cup | | League Cup | | Other | | Total | |
| Club | Season | Division | Apps | Goals | Apps | Goals | Apps | Goals | Apps | Goals | Apps | Goals |
|---|---|---|---|---|---|---|---|---|---|---|---|---|
| Dunfermline Athletic | 2007–08 | First Division | 2 | 0 | 0 | 0 | 1 | 0 | 1 (Note: Appearances in the Scottish Challenge Cup) | 0 | 4 | 0 |
| Dunfermline Athletic | 2008–09 | First Division | 0 | 0 | 0 | 0 | 0 | 0 | 0 | 0 | 0 | 0 |
| Dunfermline Athletic | Dunfermline total | | 2 | 0 | 0 | 0 | 1 | 0 | 1 | 0 | 4 | 0 |
| Arbroath (loan) | 2007–08 | Third Division | 12 | 2 | 0 | 0 | 0 | 0 | 1 (Note: Appearance in the Second Division play-offs) | 0 | 13 | 2 |
| Cowdenbeath | 2009–10 | Second Division | 25 | 6 | 0 | 0 | 1 | 0 | 6 (Note: Two appearances and a goal in the Scottish Challenge Cup; four appearances in the First Division play-offs) | 1 | 32 | 7 |
| Raith Rovers | 2010–11 | First Division | 24 | 0 | 0 | 0 | 0 | 0 | 0 | 0 | 24 | 0 |
| Raith Rovers | 2011–12 | First Division | 4 | 0 | 0 | 0 | 1 | 0 | 0 | 0 | 5 | 0 |
| Raith Rovers | Raith Rovers total | | 28 | 0 | 0 | 0 | 1 | 0 | 0 | 0 | 29 | 0 |
| East Fife | 2012–13 | Second Division | 29 | 11 | 0 | 0 | 1 | 0 | 6 (Note: Two appearances and a goal in the Scottish Challenge Cup; four appearances in the Second Division play-offs) | 1 | 36 | 12 |
| East Fife | 2013–14 | League One | 19 | 1 | 1 | 0 | 0 | 0 | 5 (Note: One appearance in the Scottish Challenge Cup; four appearances and two goals in the League One play-offs) | 2 | 25 | 3 |
| East Fife | East Fife total | | 48 | 12 | 1 | 0 | 1 | 0 | 11 | 3 | 61 | 15 |
| Arbroath | 2014–15 | League Two | 28 | 3 | 4 | 1 | 1 | 0 | 3 (Note: One appearance in the Scottish Challenge Cup; two appearances in the League One play-offs) | 0 | 36 | 4 |
| Albion Rovers | 2015–16 | League One | 30 | 9 | 1 | 0 | 0 | 0 | 1 | 0 | 32 | 9 |
| Albion Rovers | 2016–17 | League One | 29 | 1 | 2 | 0 | 3 | 0 | 2 | 0 | 36 | 1 |
| Albion Rovers | Albion Rovers total | | 59 | 10 | 3 | 0 | 3 | 0 | 3 | 0 | 68 | 10 |
| Forfar Athletic | 2017–18 | League One | 6 | 0 | 0 | 0 | 3 | 0 | 0 | 0 | 9 | 0 |
| Career total | | | 208 | 33 | 8 | 1 | 11 | 0 | 25 | 4 | 252 | 38 |
