= Ross Brown =

Ross Brown may refer to:

- Ross Brown (rugby union) (1934–2014), New Zealand rugby union player
- Ross Brown (rower) (born 1981), Australian rower
- Ross Brown (politician), Green politician in Northern Ireland
- Ross Brown (footballer) (born 1993), Scottish footballer

== See also ==
- Claire Ross-Brown (born 1972), English actress
- Ross Brawn (born 1954), British Formula One managing director
