= Ryan Wallace (footballer) =

Scottish footballer (born 1990)

Personal information
- Full name: Ryan Wallace
- Date of birth: 30 July 1990 (age 36)
- Place of birth: Bellshill, Scotland
- Position: Forward

Senior career*
Years	Team	Apps	(Gls)
2009–2010	Heart of Midlothian	2	(0)
2009	→ Raith Rovers (loan)	4	(1)
2010	Airdrie United	8	(3)
2011–2012	East Fife	45	(28)
2012–2016	Dunfermline Athletic	96	(28)
2016–2017	Albion Rovers	27	(11)
2017	Stranraer	17	(8)
2018–2019	Arbroath	53	(19)
2019–22	East Fife	53	(12)
2022–24	Dumbarton	41	(7)
Total		346	(117)
- * Club domestic league appearances and goals as of 19:25, 14 February 2024 (UTC)

Ryan Wallace (born 30 July 1990) is former Scottish professional footballer who played as a forward. He started his career at Heart of Midlothian, before moving on to play for Airdrie United, East Fife, Dunfermline Athletic, Albion Rovers, Stranraer, Arbroath and Dumbarton as well as Raith Rovers where he had a short loan spell.

== Career ==
=== Hearts ===
A member of Hearts's under-19 squad, Wallace joined Raith Rovers on loan in October 2009. He made his debut on 31 October, scoring in a 2–1 win over Partick Thistle. In all he made four appearances scoring once before returning to Hearts.

He made his Hearts debut on 23 January 2010, coming on as a late substitute in their Scottish Premier League match against Rangers at Ibrox. He made one more first team appearance against Hamilton Academical before being released by the club at the end of his contract in May 2010.

=== Airdrie ===
Following his release from Hearts, Wallace signed for Scottish Second Division side Airdrie United. He made his debut on 24 July 2010, in a 2–1 defeat to Ayr United in the Challenge Cup, with his league debut coming on 7 August 2010, against East Fife. Wallace scored his first goal for the club on 14 August, from the penalty spot, however was sent off in the dying minutes of the game for a professional foul. He missed four weeks of the season after suffering a broken jaw in a friendly with Queen's Park.

His contract with Airdrie was terminated in January 2011 by mutual consent, following a fight in the stadium car park with fellow player Scott Gibson. In all he made eleven appearances, scoring three times.

=== East Fife ===
Wallace then joined fellow Scottish Second Division side East Fife. He made his debut as a substitute on 19 February 2011, in a league match against Brechin City. He scored his first goals for the club on 23 February, netting twice in a 4–0 victory over Ayr United. He won the Scottish Football League Ginger Boot award for April 2011. In all Wallace made thirteen appearances, scoring eight times in his debut season.

In his second season with the club, Wallace scored 27 goals, including 20 in the league which attracted the interest of various SPFL clubs. One of his goals came against SPL side Aberdeen at Pittodrie, a goal which would help his side defeat the Dons and progress to the next round of the League Cup. In April 2012, he was named among the nominees for the PFA Scotland Scottish Third Division Player of the Year.

=== Dunfermline ===
On 1 June 2012, it was announced that Wallace had agreed to join Scottish First Division side Dunfermline Athletic, pending a compensation agreement with East Fife because of his age. On 8 June, the deal was finalised and he signed a two-year contract. After winning the Scottish League One title with the Pars, Wallace was released by the club at the end of the 2015–16 season.

=== Albion Rovers & Stranraer ===
A month after leaving East End Park, Wallace joined Scottish League One side Albion Rovers on a one-year deal. Wallace scored 11 goals in 31 appearances for Rovers, before signing with fellow League One club Stranraer on 16 May 2017. Wallace enjoyed a good scoring record with Stranraer, however, with the club struggling financially, Wallace was allowed to leave the club at the end of December 2017.

=== Arbroath ===
In January 2018, Wallace signed for fellow League One side Arbroath for an undisclosed fee. He was named Scottish League One Player of the Month for August 2018, after scoring three goals and assisting five others during the month. Wallace was part of the squad that won the League One title in 2018–19, scoring the goal that earned the point needed to clinch the title.

=== East Fife ===
On 14 May 2019, it was announced that East Fife had agreed a fee with Arbroath for Wallace to return to the club, with the transfer to be completed in the summer of 2019. He left the club after three seasons in June 2022 following the Fifers' relegation to Scottish League Two.

=== Dumbarton ===
Wallace joined fellow Scottish League Two side Dumbarton on a two-year deal on 11 June 2022. He scored an 88th-minute winner on his league debut for the club against former side Albion Rovers and finished the season with four goals in 32 appearances. The following season he scored the Sons' first goal of the season in a 2-1 victory against Inverness Caledonian Thistle, one of six he would score before announcing his retirement for personal reasons in February 2024.

== Career statistics ==
As of 19:25, 14 February 2024 (UTC)

Appearances and goals by club, season and competition
Club	Season	League			Scottish Cup		League Cup		Other		Total	
Club	Season	Division	Apps	Goals	Apps	Goals	Apps	Goals	Apps	Goals	Apps	Goals
Heart of Midlothian	2009–10	Scottish Premier League	2	0	0	0	0	0	0	0	2	0
Raith Rovers (loan)	2009–10	Scottish First Division	4	1	0	0	0	0	0	0	4	1
Airdrie United	2010–11	Scottish Second Division	8	3	1	0	1	0	1 (Note: Appearances in the Scottish Challenge Cup)	0	11	3
East Fife	2010–11	Scottish Second Division	13	8	0	0	0	0	0	0	13	8
East Fife	2011–12	Scottish Second Division	32	20	2	1	4	2	3	4	41	27
East Fife	Total		45	28	2	1	4	2	3	4	54	35
Dunfermline Athletic	2012–13	Scottish First Division	31	10	2	0	2	1	2 (Note: One appearance and a goal in the Scottish Challenge Cup and one appearance in the First Division play-offs)	1	37	12
Dunfermline Athletic	2013–14	Scottish League One	27	10	4	2	2	1	2	0	35	13
Dunfermline Athletic	2014–15	Scottish League One	4	0	0	0	1	1	0	0	5	1
Dunfermline Athletic	2015–16	Scottish League One	34	8	1	0	3	1	3	1	41	10
Dunfermline Athletic	Total		96	28	7	2	8	4	7	2	118	35
Albion Rovers	2016–17	Scottish League One	27	11	1	0	2	0	1	0	31	11
Stranraer	2017–18	Scottish League One	17	8	1	0	3	0	2	2	23	10
Arbroath	2017–18	Scottish League One	18	8	0	0	0	0	2 (Note: Appearances in the Scottish Championship play-offs)	0	20	8
Arbroath	2018–19	Scottish League One	35	11	1	0	4	1	2	0	42	12
Arbroath	Total		53	19	1	0	4	1	4	0	62	20
East Fife	2019–20	Scottish League One	22	6	0	0	4	0	1	0	27	6
East Fife	2020–21	Scottish League One	15	4	1	0	4	2	0	0	20	6
East Fife	2021–22	Scottish League One	16	2	0	0	0	2	0	0	18	2
East Fife	Total		53	12	1	0	8	2	1	0	65	14
Dumbarton	2022–23	Scottish League Two	24	3	3	1	4	0	1	0	32	4
Dumbarton	2023–24	Scottish League Two	17	4	3	1	4	1	2	0	26	6
Dumbarton	Total		41	7	6	2	8	1	3	0	58	10
Career total			318	112	19	5	38	10	23	8	398	135

== Honours ==
=== Club ===
Dunfermline Athletic

- Scottish League One: 2015–16

Arbroath

- Scottish League One: 2018–19

=== Individual ===
- Scottish League One Player of the Month: August 2018
