= Darren Smith (footballer, born 1980) =

Scottish footballer and coach

Personal information
- Date of birth: 4 June 1980 (age 46)
- Place of birth: Edinburgh, Scotland
- Height: 5 ft 6 in (1.68 m)
- Position: Midfielder

Youth career
- –1998: Berwick Rangers Colts

Senior career*
Years	Team	Apps	(Gls)
1998–2005	Berwick Rangers	192	(35)
2005–2009	Brechin City	122	(17)
2009–2010	Raith Rovers	27	(1)
2010–2011	Alloa Athletic	30	(1)
2011–2013	East Fife	52	(0)
2013–2014	Arbroath	18	(0)
2014	Stirling Albion	15	(0)
2015	Musselburgh Athletic		
2015–2017	Tranent Juniors		
2017–2018	Newtongrange Star		
2019–2021	Berwick Rangers		

Managerial career
- 2014: Stirling Albion (interim)
- 2016–2017: Tranent Juniors
- 2018–2019: Dalkeith Thistle
- 2019: Newtongrange Star
- 2020-2024: Bonnyrigg Rose (First Team Coach)
- * Club domestic league appearances and goals as of 16:00, 10 December 2019 (UTC)

Darren Smith (born 4 June 1980 in Edinburgh) is a Scottish former professional footballer and was a previous football first team coach with Bonnyrigg Rose but left the club in March 2024.

Smith has previously played for Berwick Rangers, Brechin City, Raith Rovers, Alloa Athletic, East Fife, Arbroath and Stirling Albion in the SPFL.

Smith has also managed Tranent Juniors, Dalkeith Thistle and Newtongrange Star.

== Career ==
Smith started his senior career at Berwick Rangers before signing for Brechin City in 2005.

He moved to Scottish Football League First Division newcomers Raith Rovers in the summer of 2009. On Saturday 19 June 2010 he moved on to Alloa Athletic. On 4 June 2011, Smith moved on to East Fife.

After two seasons at East Fife, Smith signed for Scottish League One side Arbroath on 21 June 2013.

On 31 January 2014, Smith moved to Stirling Albion. Smith and teammate Ross Forsyth were put in charge of the first team after manager Greig McDonald left the club in October 2014. On 16 December 2014, Smith left Stirling Albion.

On 7 January 2015, Smith signed for Musselburgh Athletic of the Scottish Junior East Super League. He moved on to his hometown club, Tranent Juniors in the summer of 2015 and was appointed as co-interim manager in November 2016 following the resignation of previous manager Gary Small.

On 27 November 2017, Tranent Juniors co-bosses Darren Smith and Kenny Rafferty resigned following a Scottish Junior Cup defeat to Jeanfield Swifts.

Smith signed for Newtongrange Star as a player after leaving Tranent, but returned to management with Kenny Rafferty at Dalkeith Thistle in June 2018. Both Smith and Rafferty resigned to take up positions as co-managers at Newtongrange Star in March 2019.

Smith returned to Berwick Rangers as a player in December 2019.

Smith left Berwick Rangers in May 2021 and later accepted a coaching role with Bonnyrigg Rose.
