= Lloyd Young =

American football player (1903–1978)

Profile
- Positions: Guard, center, tackle, end

Personal information
- Born: May 17, 1903; Austin, Minnesota
- Died: July 10, 1978 (aged 75); Austin, Minnesota
- Listed height: 6 ft 2 in (1.88 m)
- Listed weight: 192 lb (87 kg)

Career information
- High school: Austin (MN)
- College: Macalester, North Dakota

Career history
- Providence Steam Roller (1925–1927); Minneapolis Red Jackets (1929–1930)

Frederick Lloyd Young (May 27, 1903 – July 10, 1978) was an American football player.

Young was born in 1903 in Austin, Minnesota. He played college football for Macalester College and the University of North Dakota. He also played professional football at the guard, center, tackle, and end positions in the National Football League (NFL) for the Providence Steam Roller from 1925 to 1927 and the Minneapolis Red Jackets from 1929 to 1930. He appeared in 35 NFL games, 24 as a starter.

His brother Sam Young also played in the NFL.

Young died in 1978 in Austin, Minnesota.
