= Rhys McCabe =

Scottish footballer (born 1992)

Personal information
- Full name: Rhys McCabe
- Date of birth: 24 July 1992 (age 34)
- Place of birth: Polbeth, Scotland
- Position: Central midfielder

Youth career
- Rangers

Senior career*
Years	Team	Apps	(Gls)
2011–2012	Rangers	19	(0)
2012–2015	Sheffield Wednesday	40	(1)
2015	→ Portsmouth (loan)	8	(0)
2015–2017	Dunfermline Athletic	38	(5)
2017–2018	Sligo Rovers	45	(6)
2019	St Patrick's Athletic	29	(4)
2020	Brechin City	15	(2)
2020–2021	Queen of the South	32	(0)
2021–2025	Airdrieonians	83	(6)

International career^{‡}
2012–2013	Scotland U21	3	(0)

Managerial career
- 2022–2025: Airdrieonians
- * Club domestic league appearances and goals as of 22:42, 10 April 2025 (UTC) ‡ National team caps and goals as of 09:10, 12 June 2021 (UTC)

Rhys McCabe (born 24 July 1992) is a Scottish football manager and player, who most recently managed Scottish Championship club Airdrieonians.

McCabe started his senior career with Rangers. McCabe has also played for Dunfermline Athletic, Brechin City and Queen of the South in Scotland, English clubs Sheffield Wednesday and Portsmouth, and Irish clubs Sligo Rovers and St Patrick's Athletic. McCabe has also represented the Scotland national under-21 football team.

== Club career ==
=== Rangers ===
A member of Rangers under-19 squad McCabe scored in the Youth Cup Final in April 2011 in what was ultimately a 2–1 defeat to Celtic. In July 2011 he made his first team debut as a substitute in a friendly against Blackpool, going on to make subsequent appearances in friendlies against Liverpool and Hamburg. He signed a contract extension in December 2011 extending his stay with the club to 2015. Having been an unused substitute in nine previous fixtures that season, he made his Scottish Premier League debut on 3 March 2012, playing the full 90 minutes in a 2–1 defeat to Hearts. On 25 March he made his Old Firm debut in a 3–2 win over Celtic.

=== Sheffield Wednesday ===
He then signed a three-year contract with Sheffield Wednesday. On 11 October 2012 Sheffield Wednesday agreed an undisclosed settlement with Rangers. His first goal for Sheffield Wednesday was an edge of the box screamer from a corner against Charlton Athletic on 22 December 2012. The goal was subsequently voted goal of the day on Sky Sports News. He scored his second goal for the club in a League Cup tie against Rotherham United.

On 17 March 2014, McCabe joined League Two club Portsmouth on loan for the rest of the 2013–14 season. He was recalled early from his loan spell by The Owls on 24 April 2014. McCabe was released along with 10 other players from his contract at the end of the 2014–15 season.

=== Dunfermline Athletic ===
After his release, McCabe was reported as having attracted the interest of a number of clubs in his native Scotland. Following trials with St Johnstone and Hibernian, McCabe signed for Scottish League One side Dunfermline Athletic in September 2015 making his debut as a first half substitute in a 5–0 victory against Stenhousemuir, one day after signing for the club as. His first goal for the Pars came against Albion Rovers, after an error from Rovers keeper Ross M. Stewart saw McCabe's long-range effort punched into the goal.

=== Sligo Rovers ===
On 7 June 2017, McCabe agreed to sign for League of Ireland Premier Division club Sligo Rovers during the July transfer window, following the end of his contract with Dunfermline Athletic.

=== St Patrick's Athletic ===
On 23 January 2019, it was announced that McCabe had signed for St Patrick's Athletic alongside Chris Forrester who signed from Aberdeen. It was announced on 6 November 2019 that McCabe was released, following the end of his contract with the Saints which whom he played for 27 times over the season, scoring once.

=== Brechin City ===
In January 2020, McCabe signed a six-month contract with Brechin City.

=== Queen of the South ===
On 24 August 2020, McCabe signed a one-year contract with Queen of the South until 31 May 2021.

On 23 January 2021, McCabe captained the club in the absence of Stephen Dobbie captain and Gregor Buchanan vice captain through injury, as Queens won 2-1 versus Greenock Morton at Palmerston.

=== Airdrieonians ===
On 11 June 2021, McCabe signed a one-year contract with Airdrieonians in Scottish League One.

== Coaching career ==
=== Airdrieonians ===
On 26 May 2022, following the departure of manager Ian Murray, McCabe was announced as the player-manager of Airdrieonians. In his first season in charge, McCabe led the Diamonds to promotion to the Scottish Championship via the play-offs at the end of the 2022-23 season.

On 24 March 2024, McCabe guided Airdrie to their first Scottish Challenge Cup trophy in 15 years with victory over The New Saints.

At the end of the 2024-25 season, he ensured the club remained in the second tier, beating Scottish League One club Cove Rangers in the playoff final.

Two matches into the 2025-26 season, on 15 August 2025, McCabe resigned.

== International career ==
McCabe made his debut for the Scotland national under-21 football team in April 2012.

== Personal life ==
McCabe's cousin Callum Fordyce is also a professional footballer; two previously played together at Airdrieonians (Callum Fordyce was also McCabe's assistant manager at Airdireionians until his departure) and at Dunfermline Athletic. Shelley Kerr, the former Scotland Women's manager is his aunt.

== Career statistics ==
As of 13 May 2022

Appearances and goals by club, season and competition
Club	Season	League			National Cup		League Cup		Europe		Other		Total	
Club	Season	Division	Apps	Goals	Apps	Goals	Apps	Goals	Apps	Goals	Apps	Goals	Apps	Goals
Rangers	2011–12	Scottish Premier League	9	0	0	0	0	0	0	0	—		9	0
Sheffield Wednesday	2012–13	EFL Championship	22	1	1	0	0	0	—		—		23	1
Sheffield Wednesday	2013–14	EFL Championship	7	0	2	0	1	1	—		—		10	1
Sheffield Wednesday	2014–15	EFL Championship	1	0	1	0	1	0	—		—		3	0
Sheffield Wednesday	Sheffield Wednesday Total		30	1	4	0	2	1	—		—		36	2
Portsmouth (loan)	2013–14	EFL League Two	4	0	0	0	0	0	—		0	0	4	0
Dunfermline Athletic	2015–16	Scottish League One	15	2	1	0	1	0	—		1 (Note: Appearance(s) and goal(s) in the Scottish Challenge Cup.)	0	18	2
Dunfermline Athletic	2016–17	Scottish Championship	23	3	3	0	4	0	—		3	0	33	3
Dunfermline Athletic	Dunfermline Athletic Total		38	5	4	0	5	0	—		4	0	51	5
Sligo Rovers	2017	League of Ireland Premier Division	13	4	1	0	0	0	—		1	0	15	4
Sligo Rovers	2018	League of Ireland Premier Division	32	2	1	0	3	0	—		2	0	38	2
Sligo Rovers	Sligo Rovers Total		45	6	2	0	3	0	—		3	0	53	6
St Patrick's Athletic	2019	League of Ireland Premier Division	25	1	0	0	0	0	2 (Note: Appearance(s) and goal(s) in the UEFA Europa League.)	0	0	0	27	1
Brechin City	2019–20	Scottish League Two	5	0	0	0	0	0	—		0	0	5	0
Queen of the South	2020–21	Scottish Championship	22	0	2	0	2	0	—		0	0	26	0
Airdrieonians	2021–22	Scottish League One	32	5	2	0	2	1	—		4 (Note: 1 appearance in the Scottish Challenge Cup & 3 appearances, 1 goal in Scottish League One Playoffs.)	1	40	7
Career total			210	18	14	0	14	2	2	0	11	1	251	21

== Managerial statistics ==
As of match played 9 August 2025

Team	From	To	Record				
Team	From	To	G	W	D	L	Win %
Airdrieonians	26 May 2022	15 August 2025	154	67	30	57	43.51

== Honours ==
=== Player ===
Dunfermline Athletic

- Scottish League One: 2015–16

Airdrieonians

- Scottish Challenge Cup: 2023–24

=== Manager ===
Airdrieonians

- Scottish Championship play-offs: 2022–23
- Scottish Challenge Cup: 2023–24
