= Ross Brown (footballer) =

Scottish footballer (born 1993)

Personal information
- Date of birth: 10 June 1993 (age 33)
- Place of birth: Dunfermline, Scotland
- Position: Midfielder

Team information
- Current team: Dundonald Bluebell
- Number: 7

Youth career
- East Fife

Senior career*
Years	Team	Apps	(Gls)
2012–2017	East Fife	117	(7)
2017–2018	Livingston	0	(0)
2018	Airdrieonians	9	(0)
2018–2019	Berwick Rangers	30	(1)
2019–2021	Brechin	21	(0)
- * Club domestic league appearances and goals

Ross Brown (born 10 June 1993) is a Scottish footballer who plays as a midfielder for Dundonald Bluebell.

== Career ==
Brown started his career in the youth academy of East Fife and made his professional debut as 65th a substitute replacing Steve Hislop in a 3–0 defeat to Dumbarton on 12 November 2011. He went on to make 117 appearances for the club before earning a move into full-time football with Livingston.

He was brought to Livi by then manager David Hopkin in 2017. By this point, the Almondvale side were having a resurgence in fortunes after a fairly miserable few years. Brown found it difficult to make an impact in West Lothian and eventually left the club without making a single first team appearance.

In 2018, he signed for Airdrieonians until the end of the season. Brown made 9 appearances for the Diamonds before being released.

Brown signed for Berwick Rangers in the summer of 2018 and made 30 appearances in one season for the Wee Gers.

After just 21 appearances in two years at Brechin, Brown dropped into the junior leagues and signed for Dundonald Bluebell in 2021.
