= Liam Gormley =

Scottish footballer (born 1993)

Personal information
- Date of birth: 19 March 1993 (age 33)
- Place of birth: Bellshill, Scotland
- Position: Forward

Team information
- Current team: Rutherglen Glencairn

Youth career
- –2009: Motherwell
- 2009–2012: Celtic

Senior career*
Years	Team	Apps	(Gls)
2012	Greenock Morton	1	(0)
2012–2013	East Fife	15	(2)
2013–2014	Queen's Park	26	(3)
2014–2016	East Kilbride		
2016	Kilbirnie Ladeside		
2016–2017	Cambuslang Rangers		
2017–	Rutherglen Glencairn		

International career^{‡}
2008	Scotland U16	2	(0)
2009	Scotland U17	2	(0)
- * Club domestic league appearances and goals as of 13:11, 21 February 2018 (UTC) ‡ National team caps and goals as of 18:40, 12 October 2016 (UTC)

Liam Gormley (born 19 March 1993), is a Scottish professional footballer who plays for Rutherglen Glencairn in the West of Scotland Football League. He has previously appeared in the Scottish Football League First Division for Greenock Morton.

== Career ==
As a youngster at Motherwell, Gormley was called up to the Scotland U16 squad for the 2008 Victory Shield, making two appearances. The following year, he also played twice for the U17s and moved to Celtic to sign his first professional contract. Despite winning numerous honours at youth level, including the 2010–11 Scottish Youth Cup where he scored the decisive goal in the final against Rangers in front of 9,427 fans at Hampden Park, Gormley did not make a first-team appearance at Celtic and was released in the summer of 2012.

Gormley had trials at Birmingham City and Greenock Morton at the start of the 2012–13 season, and made one league appearance for the Cappielow club against Raith Rovers in September 2012. He later joined East Fife on a permanent basis, scoring on his debut against Albion Rovers in November 2012. A new contract offer was withdrawn at the beginning of the following season and Gormley eventually signed for Queen's Park in September 2013, again scoring on his debut.

A two-year stint in the Lowland Football League with East Kilbride, included a run to the fifth round of the 2015–16 Scottish Cup where Gormley faced former club Celtic. After leaving East Kilbride, Gormley signed briefly with Junior side, Kilbirnie Ladeside before joining Cambuslang Rangers in September 2016. Gormley joined 'Langs local rivals Rutherglen Glencairn in September 2017.
