= Darren McCormack =

Scottish footballer (born 1988)

Personal information
- Date of birth: 29 September 1988 (age 38)
- Place of birth: Edinburgh, Scotland
- Position: Defender

Youth career
- 2001–2007: Hibernian

Senior career*
Years	Team	Apps	(Gls)
2007–2010	Hibernian	24	(0)
2010–2011	Ross County	23	(0)
2012–2013	East Fife	31	(1)
2013–2014	Airdrieonians	34	(0)
2014–2017	Brechin City	69	(2)
2021–2023	Tranent Juniors		

International career^{‡}
2008	Scotland U21	1	(0)
- * Club domestic league appearances and goals as of 21:20, 30 May 2017 (UTC) ‡ National team caps and goals as of 12 November 2010

Darren McCormack (born 29 September 1988) is a Scottish professional footballer who used to play as a defender for Tranent Juniors now a free agent.

McCormack, a defender, started his career with Scottish Premier League club Hibernian, but was released at the end of the 2009–10 season. McCormack then signed for Ross County, but he suffered a broken leg and was again released. He signed for East Fife in January 2012 and Airdrieonians in July 2013, then Brechin City in June 2014. He was also banned from the sport in 2017 following attempted murder and previous convictions until he signed for Tranent Juniors in July 2021. McCormack has also represented the Scotland national under-21 football team.

== Playing career ==
Celtic made an approach to sign McCormack in 2007, but he signed a five-year deal to stay with Hibs. He made his league debut for Hibs in a 4–1 win over Kilmarnock in September 2007. McCormack was selected for the Scotland under–21 squad for the match against Norway in May 2008. He was also selected for the match against Lithuania in August 2008, but did not play.

McCormack made his first first-team appearance for Hibs in over a year in a 2–0 win against St Mirren during January 2009, replacing the suspended David van Zanten at right back. His appearances were limited during the 2009–10 season, making only six first team appearances as of February 2010. He was sent off during the last of those appearances, an Edinburgh derby match. McCormack's contract was not renewed by Hibs at the end of the season.

After his release by Hibs at the end of the 2009–10 season, McCormack signed for Scottish First Division club Ross County. He suffered a broken leg and was released by Ross County in September 2011.

McCormack signed for Scottish Second Division club East Fife in January 2012. He made his debut on 2 January, in a 4–0 defeat against Cowdenbeath.

McCormack signed for Airdrieonians in July 2013, leaving the club in June 2014 to sign for Brechin City. After three seasons with Brechin, McCormack was released by the club on 30 May 2017. On 23 October 2017, McCormack was banned from competitive football until 7 April 2021 due to him failing an "in-competition test" in April 2017, when he was registered with Brechin. McCormack had tested positive for use of metabolites of metandienone (epimetendiol, epitmetandienone and hydroxymetandienone).

== Personal life ==
McCormack was arrested for an assault on Hearts striker Calum Elliot on 22 March 2009, near an Edinburgh nightclub. When the case came to Edinburgh Sheriff Court, McCormack pleaded guilty to an assault charge, and was fined £1000. The court was told that McCormack had punched Elliot in the face after Elliot had "made a deliberately antagonising remark to him about their respective football careers". McCormack, who sent an apology to Elliot via his agent, was also fined £1200 (two weeks' wages) by Hibernian.

During February 2010, McCormack was arrested by police on Leith Walk and charged with the offences of driving without insurance and driving without a licence. He was subsequently banned from driving for 12 months and fined £500.

In December 2018, it was reported that McCormack had been charged with attempted murder. No trial subsequently took place.
