= David Muir (footballer, born 1988) =

Scottish footballer

Personal information
- Date of birth: March 6, 1988 (age 38)
- Place of birth: Kirkcaldy, Scotland
- Position: Defender

Senior career*
Years	Team	Apps	(Gls)
2006–2007	Dunfermline Athletic	0	(0)
2008–2013	East Fife	133	(14)
2013	Toronto Lynx	8	(0)
2013–2015	SC Waterloo Region		
- * Club domestic league appearances and goals

David Muir (born March 6, 1988) is a former footballer who played as a defender.

== Club career ==
=== Scotland ===
Muir was a product of the Dunfermline Athletic youth system and secured a contract with the senior team in 2006.

After failing to break into the senior team, he began his professional career in 2007 with his local club, East Fife, in the Scottish Second Division. The following season, Muir re-signed with East Fife and made 36 appearances with 5 goals. In his second Scottish Challenge Cup, he helped the club reach the quarterfinal round, and they were eliminated by Queen of the South. Fife re-signed Muir for the 2011–12 season. In the 2011–12 Scottish Challenge Cup, East Fife once again made the quarterfinal round, this time being eliminated by First Division side Falkirk. Muir had a notable run with East Fife this time in the 2011–12 Scottish League Cup, where they reached the quarterfinals and were defeated by Premier League side Kilmarnock.

Muir returned for his final campaign with Fife for the 2012–13 season and served as the team captain. East Fife would finish the season in the relegation zone, and as a result, participated in the Second Division playoffs. In the preliminary round of the relegation playoffs, he scored the equalizing goal against Berwick Rangers. After winning the series against Berwick, Fife advanced to the finals, where Muir scored the winning goal against Peterhead that avoided relegation for Fife. In his final league cup tournament, he started against Rangers, where East Fife was eliminated in the opening round. Throughout his five-year tenure with East Fife, he also appeared in five editions of the Scottish Cup, where in total he appeared in 8 matches and recorded 1 goal.

=== Canada ===
After avoiding relegation with East Fife, he left the club to play in the USL Premier Development League with the Canadian side Toronto Lynx. In his debut season with Toronto, he appeared in 8 matches. Muir would play the remainder of the 2013 season with SC Waterloo Region in the Canadian Soccer League. He assisted Waterloo in securing a postseason berth by finishing fifth in the league's first division. In the opening round of the post-season, Waterloo eliminated Brampton City United. Their opponents in the following round were Toronto Croatia, and they defeated them to advance to the championship final. Waterloo would defeat Kingston FC to secure the championship.

His final season with Waterloo was in 2015. In the playoff quarterfinal round, Waterloo defeated Toronto Atomic. Waterloo qualified for the championship final by eliminating the Serbian White Eagles. In the finals, they were defeated by Toronto Croatia.

== Career statistics ==
Appearances and goals by club, season and competition
Club	Season	League			Challenge Cup		Domestic Cup		League Cup		Total	
Club	Season	League	Apps	Goals	Apps	Goals	Apps	Goals	Apps	Goals	Apps	Goals
East Fife F.C.	2008–09	Scottish Football League Second Division	1	0	0	0	2	0	0	0	3	0
East Fife F.C.	2009–10	Scottish Football League Second Division	36	5	1	0	1	0	1	1	39	6
East Fife F.C.	2010–11	Scottish Football League Second Division	35	4	3	0	2	0	1	0	41	4
East Fife F.C.	2011–12	Scottish Football League Second Division	31	4	3	0	2	0	3	0	39	4
East Fife F.C.	2012–13	Scottish Football League Second Division	30	1	2	0	1	1	1	0	34	2
Career totals			133	14	9	0	8	1	6	1	156	16

== Honors ==
SC Waterloo Region

- CSL Championship: 2013
- CSL Championship runner-up: 2015
