= Steven Campbell (footballer) =

Scottish footballer

Personal information
- Date of birth: 20 August 1986 (age 40)
- Place of birth: Scotland
- Position: Centre back

Senior career*
| Years | Team | Apps | (Gls) |
| 2004–2007 | Rangers | 0 | (0) |
| 2006–2007 | → Partick Thistle (loan) | 15 | (1) |
| 2008 | Airdrie United | 8 | (0) |
| 2008–2009 | Perth SC | 5 | (1) |
| 2009–2016 | East Fife | 110 | (6) |
- * Club domestic league appearances and goals

Steven Campbell (born 20 August 1986) is a Scottish former footballer who played as a central defender.

== Career ==
The defender never made a first team appearance for Rangers but he was listed on the bench a number of times in the 2005–06 season. With Campbell's chances of breaking into the first team small, the then manager Paul Le Guen allowed him to gain experience in the First Division by moving to Partick Thistle for the first half of the 2006–07 season. He went on to make 15 senior league appearances for Partick Thistle and scored his first senior goal against Livingston.

On 27 January 2008, Campbell signed for Airdrie United after spending over six months without a club after leaving Rangers in the summer of 2007. On 22 May that year he signed for Football West State League side Perth SC in Australia. Campbell returned to Scotland to join Fife side East Fife 3 December 2009, and he was appointed club captain five-years later, on 26 July 2014.
