= Robert Sloan (footballer) =

Scottish footballer (born 1983)

Personal information
- Date of birth: 14 July 1983 (age 43)
- Place of birth: Paisley, Scotland
- Position: Winger

Team information
- Current team: Armadale Thistle

Senior career*
Years	Team	Apps	(Gls)
1999–2005	Hearts	22	(1)
2003	→ Alloa Athletic (loan)	16	(8)
2005	St Johnstone	8	(0)
2005–2007	Alloa Athletic	67	(10)
2007–2010	Raith Rovers	92	(17)
2010–2013	East Fife	53	(9)
2013–2017	Bo'ness United	0	(0)
2017–2019	Linlithgow Rose		
2019–	Armadale Thistle		
- * Club domestic league appearances and goals

Robert Sloan (born 14 July 1983) is a Scottish footballer, who plays for Armadale Thistle in the Scottish Junior Football Association, East Region. He has previously played in the Scottish Premier League for Heart of Midlothian.

== Career ==
Sloan started his professional career with Heart of Midlothian, making his debut as an 18-year-old in a 2–0 defeat at Motherwell. He scored his first senior goal on Hearts' next visit to Fir Park, as the Jambos won 2–1 towards the end of the 2001–02 season. The following season he found his opportunities limited by the arrival of French winger Jean-Louis Valois and agreed a 6-month loan move to Alloa in January 2003. Initially this appeared to have benefited Sloan, as he made 15 first team appearances for Hearts when they finished third in the SPL in 2003–04 but he again slipped out of first team contention the following year.

In January 2005 longtime admirer John Connolly eventually succeeded in signing Sloan for St Johnstone, having earlier tried to secure him on a loan deal. However, Connolly was replaced by Owen Coyle only months after Sloan joined Saints and, not in the new manager's plans, the Paisley winger left the Perth side for Alloa Athletic in the summer.

Alloa are a part-time club and after joining them Sloan worked as a building labourer to augment his football earnings. A contract dispute led to him being transfer-listed in 2006 but when this was resolved he returned to the Wasps starting line-up. Perhaps his career highlight occurred in the 2005–06 Scottish Cup, when he scored the winning goal as Alloa upset SPL side Livingston 2–1 in a third round replay. He joined Raith Rovers in June 2007 but was released at the end of the 2009/10 season. He then joined East Fife on 31 July 2010.

Sloan joined Bo'ness United when he was released from East Fife at the end of season 2012–13.

On 24 June 2017 Sloan joined Linlithgow Rose on a two-year contract.

== Honours ==
=== Raith Rovers ===
- Scottish Second Division: 1

2008–09
