= Bayview Stadium =

Football stadium in Methil, Scotland

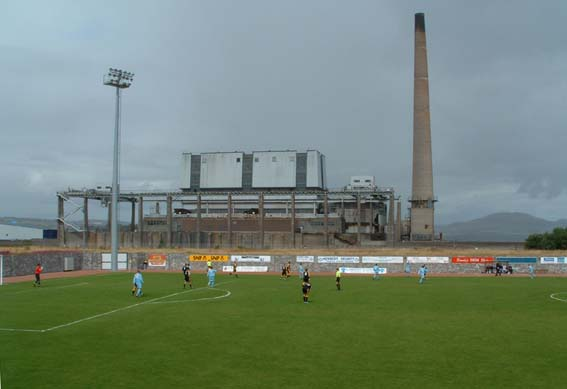
- Bayview Stadium

- Location in Fife
- Location: Methil, Scotland
- Coordinates: 56°11′19″N 2°59′56″W
- Owner: East Fife F.C.
- Capacity: 1,980
- Surface: 3G Artificial Turf

Construction
- Opened: 1998

Tenant
- East Fife F.C.

Bayview Stadium is a football stadium in the Scottish town of Methil, Fife. It is home to East Fife. It was opened in 1998, after the club relocated from the original Bayview Park across town.

The stadium can accommodate up to 1,980 spectators all of whom are seated in a single stand running along one side of the pitch. There are open areas for future expansion. In 2008, plans were announced to increase capacity with the erection of a covered terrace/stand at the sea end of the stadium. Due to the 2008 financial crisis, these plans were put on hold.

The stadium's capacity was temporarily expanded to 4,700 for a Scottish League One match against Rangers in October 2013.

The site of the stadium is near the mouth of the River Leven, at Harbour View KY8 3RW.

From its inception, the stadium had a grass playing surface, however, in May 2017 a new 3G artificial pitch was installed for the start of the 2017–18 season.

== See also ==
- Stadium relocations in Scottish football
