= 2010–11 Forfar Athletic F.C. season =

Forfar Athletic
2010–11 season
- Chairman: Neill Wilson
- Manager: Dick Campbell
- Stadium: Station Park
- Second Division: Third place
- Challenge Cup: Quarter-final, lost to Ross County
- League Cup: Second round, lost to Queen of the South
- Scottish Cup: Third round, lost to East Fife
- Top goalscorer: League: Ross Campbell (11); All: Ross Campbell (13); Chris Templeman (13)
- Highest home attendance: 782 vs. Brechin City, 21 August 2010
- Lowest home attendance: 341 vs. Ayr United, 5 April 2011
- Average home league attendance: 501

The 2010–11 season was Forfar Athletic's first season back in the Scottish Second Division, having been promoted from the Scottish Third Division at the end of the 2009–10 season. Forfar Athletic also competed in the Challenge Cup, League Cup and the Scottish Cup.

== Summary ==
Peterhead finished third in the Second Division, entering the play-offs losing 7–4 to Ayr United on aggregate and remained in the Second Division. They reached the Quarter-final of the Challenge Cup, the second round of the League Cup and the third round of the Scottish Cup.

== Results and fixtures ==
Win Draw Loss

=== Scottish Second Division ===
7 August 2010 Scottish Second Division	Forfar Athletic	4 – 1	Dumbarton	Station Park
	R Campbell 2'; Hilson 51'; Templeman 59', 77' (Penalty)	BBC Report	Chaplain 5' (Penalty)	Attendance: 510; Referee: McKendrick

14 August 2010 Scottish Second Division	Peterhead	1 – 2	Forfar Athletic	Balmoor
15:00	Gethans 77'	SFL Report	Gibson 18'; Hilson 27'; Gallacher (red card) 71'	Attendance: 371; Referee: Madden

21 August 2010 Scottish Second Division	Forfar Athletic	1 – 1	Brechin City	Station Park
	Templeman 59'	BBC Report	King 77'	Attendance: 782; Referee: Salmond

28 August 2010 Scottish Second Division	Livingston	2 – 0	Forfar Athletic	Braidwood Motor Company Stadium
15:00	Winters 24'; Jacobs 68'	BBC Report		Attendance: 1,553; Referee: Northcroft

11 September 2010 Scottish Second Division	Forfar Athletic	3 – 2	East Fife	Station Park
	Templeman 54', 77', 94'	BBC Report	Johnstone 13'; Ovenstone 86'	Attendance: 590; Referee: Robertson

18 September 2010 Scottish Second Division	Stenhousemuir	3 – 0	Forfar Athletic	Ochilview Park
	Quinn 4', 69'; Scullion 72'	BBC Report		Attendance: 522; Referee: Allan

25 September 2010 Scottish Second Division	Forfar Athletic	1 – 2	Airdrie United	Station Park
	Bolocheweckyj 25'	SFL Report	McCord 58'; Wallace 75'; Grant (yellow card) 76' (red card)	Attendance: 577; Referee: Law

2 October 2010 Scottish Second Division	Alloa Athletic	3 – 2	Forfar Athletic	Recreation Park
	McDonald 6', 17'; Gibson 29'	BBC Report	Tod 44'; Deasley 78'	Attendance: 436; Referee: Madden

16 October 2010 Scottish Second Division	Forfar Athletic	4 – 1	Ayr United	Station Park
	R Campbell 12' (Penalty); Templeman 59'; Fotheringham 81' (Penalty); Gibson 91'	BBC Report	Robertson (yellow card) 68' (red card); Keenan (yellow card) 77' (red card); Easton 89'	Attendance: 544; Referee: Brown

23 October 2010 Scottish Second Division	East Fife	1 – 3	Forfar Athletic	Bayview Stadium
	Linn 53'	BBC Report	R Campbell 44', 70'; Fotheringham 60'	Attendance: 524; Referee: McKendrick

30 October 2010 Scottish Second Division	Forfar Athletic	1 – 0	Livingston	Station Park
15:00	Allan 72'	BBC Report		Attendance: 612; Referee: McLean

6 November 2010 Scottish Second Division	Forfar Athletic	1 – 1	Peterhead	Station Park
	I Campbell (yellow card) 34' (red card); R Campbell (red card) 37'; Fotheringham 88'	SFL Report	Clark 79'	Attendance: 497; Referee: Nicholls

13 November 2010 Scottish Second Division	Brechin City	0 – 0	Forfar Athletic	Glebe Park
		BBC Report		Attendance: 786; Referee: McKendrick

25 January 2011 Scottish Second Division	Dumbarton	1 – 2	Forfar Athletic	Strathclyde Homes Stadium
	Walker 26'	BBC Report	Fotheringham 71'; Deasley 72'	Attendance: 404; Referee: Colvin

1 February 2011 Scottish Second Division	Forfar Athletic	0 – 0	East Fife	Station Park
		BBC Report		Attendance: 438; Referee: Law

5 February 2011 Scottish Second Division	Stenhousemuir	0 – 1	Forfar Athletic	Ochilview Park
		BBC Report	Bolochoweckyj 14'; Fotheringham (red card) 20'	Attendance: 504; Referee: Robertson

12 February 2011 Scottish Second Division	Alloa Athletic	0 – 3	Forfar Athletic	Recreation Park
		BBC Report	Campbell 61', 80'; Smith 93'	Attendance: 414; Referee: Watters

15 February 2011 Scottish Second Division	Forfar Athletic	1 – 1	Alloa Athletic	Station Park
	Campbell 71' (Penalty)	BBC Report	Lister 81'	Attendance: 390; Referee: Beaton

22 February 2011 Scottish Second Division	Airdrie United	2 – 0	Forfar Athletic	Excelsior Stadium
	Donnelly 49'; Gemmill 71'	SFL Report		Attendance: 437; Referee: Winter

26 February 2011 Scottish Second Division	Forfar Athletic	2 – 1	Dumbarton	Station Park
	Brady 5'; R Campbell 78'	BBC Report	McShane 36'	Attendance: 487; Referee: Salmond

1 March 2011 Scottish Second Division	Livingston	3 – 0	Forfar Athletic	Braidwood Motor Company Stadium
19:45	Russell 5' (pen.); De Vita 61'; Winters 88'	BBC Report		Attendance: 724; Referee: David Somers

5 March 2011 Scottish Second Division	Peterhead	1 – 1	Forfar Athletic	Balmoor
15:00	Gethans 34'	SFL Report	Campbell 93'	Attendance: 479; Referee: McDermott

8 March 2011 Scottish Second Division	Forfar Athletic	2 – 1	Brechin City	Station Park
	Templeman 86'; R Campbell 93'	BBC Report	Moyes 65'	Attendance: 604; Referee: Watters

12 March 2011 Scottish Second Division	East Fife	3 – 0	Forfar Athletic	Bayview Stadium
	Hislop 33'; Smart 74'; Linn 88'	BBC Report		Attendance: 469; Referee: Finnie

19 March 2011 Scottish Second Division	Forfar Athletic	0 – 4	Livingston	Station Park
15:00		BBC Report	Deuchar 23', 57'; Fox 45'; Russell 60'	Attendance: 552; Referee: McKendrick

23 March 2011 Scottish Second Division	Ayr United	0 – 1	Forfar Athletic	Somerset Park
		BBC Report	Deasley 86'	Attendance: 909; Referee: Colvin

26 March 2011 Scottish Second Division	Airdrie United	3 – 1	Forfar Athletic	Excelsior Stadium
	Gallacher 22' (Own Goal); McCord 40' (Penalty); Donnelly 43'	SFL Report	McQuade 31'	Attendance: 594; Referee: Roache

29 March 2011 Scottish Second Division	Forfar Athletic	1 – 2	Airdrie United	Station Park
	Bolocheweckyj 42'	SFL Report	Owens 4'; Morton 91'	Attendance: 419; Referee: Nicholls

2 April 2011 Scottish Second Division	Forfar Athletic	1 – 1	Stenhousemuir	Station Park
	Dow 16'	BBC Report	Devlin (red card) 62'; Anderson 78'	Attendance: 416; Referee: Norris

5 April 2011 Scottish Second Division	Forfar Athletic	3 – 2	Ayr United	Station Park
	R Campbell 51'; Fotheringham 75', 84'	BBC Report	Trouten 37'; McLaughlin 71'	Attendance: 341; Referee: Hilland

9 April 2011 Scottish Second Division	Ayr United	3 – 1	Forfar Athletic	Somerset Park
	Bannigan 8', 82'; Roberts 13'	BBC Report	Bolocheweckyj 75'	Attendance: 851; Referee: McLean

12 April 2011 Scottish Second Division	Forfar Athletic	2 – 0	Stenhousemuir	Station Park
	Templeman 37'; Dow 45+2'	BBC Report		Attendance: 347; Referee: Beaton

16 April 2011 Scottish Second Division	Forfar Athletic	3 – 1	Alloa Athletic	Station Park
	Fotheringham 23'; Templeman 60'; Dow 62'	BBC Report	Lister 56'	Attendance: 458; Referee: Law

23 April 2011 Scottish Second Division	Brechin City	0 – 1	Forfar Athletic	Glebe Park
	McKenna (red card) 25'	BBC Report	Hilson 58'	Attendance: 825; Referee: Northcroft

30 April 2011 Scottish Second Division	Forfar Athletic	2 – 1	Peterhead	Station Park
	Smith 35'; Sellars 66'	SFL Report	Wyness 64'; Ross (red card) 73'	Attendance: 448; Referee: Collum

7 May 2011 Scottish Second Division	Dumbarton	0 – 0	Forfar Athletic	Strathclyde Homes Stadium
		BBC Report		Attendance: 787; Referee: Roache

=== First Division play-offs ===
11 May 2011 Play-offs Semi Final Leg 1	Forfar Athletic	1 – 4	Ayr United	Station Park
19:45	Templeman 10'	SFL Report	Moffat 2'; Bishop , 35' (o.g.); McCann 52'; Rodgers 87'	Attendance: 924; Referee: McKendrick

14 May 2011 Play-offs Semi Final Leg 2	Ayr United	3 – 3 (7 – 4 agg.)	Forfar Athletic	Somerset Park
15:00	Moffat 12'; McLaughlin 48'; Trouten 90' (pen.)	SFL Report	Hilson 31'; Sellars 56'; Campbell 90' (pen.)	Attendance: 1,198; Referee: Winter

=== Scottish Challenge Cup ===
10 August 2010 Challenge Cup round 2^{[Note1]}	Queen's Park	2 – 3 (a.e.t.)	Forfar Athletic	Hampden Park
	Watt 31'; McBride 70'	SFL Report	Templeman 74'; Deasley 76'; Sellars 94'; Campbell (red card) 84'	Attendance: 404; Referee: Smith

4 September 2010 Challenge Cup QF	Forfar Athletic	0 – 2	Ross County	Station Park
	Bolochoweckyj (red card) 59'	SFL Report	Lawson 11', 70'; Scott (red card) 56'	Attendance: 552; Referee: Muir

=== Scottish League Cup ===
31 July 2010 League Cup round 1	Stirling Albion	1 – 2	Forfar Athletic	Forthbank Stadium
	Taggart 65'	BBC Report	Campbell 16'; Campbell 51'	Attendance: 599; Referee: Conroy

25 August 2010 League Cup round 2	Queen of the South	4 – 1	Forfar Athletic	Palmerston Park
	McLaren 16'; Harris 22' (Penalty); Weatherston 63'; Carmichael 76'	SFL Report	Templeman 57'	Attendance: 981; Referee: Nicholls

=== Scottish Cup ===
20 November 2010 Scottish Cup round 3	East Fife	3 – 1	Forfar Athletic	Bayview Stadium
	Sloan 24' (Penalty); Johnstone 45'; Hislop 47'	BBC Report	Tod 81'	Attendance: 695; Referee: McDermott

== Player statistics ==
=== Squad ===
No.	Pos	Nat	Player	Total		Second Division		Other^{[Note2]}		League Cup		Scottish Cup	
No.	Pos	Nat	Player	Apps	Goals	Apps	Goals	Apps	Goals	Apps	Goals	Apps	Goals
	GK	(Scotland) SCO	Scott Gallacher	31	0	29+0	0	0+0	0	1+0	0	1+0	0
	GK	(Scotland) SCO	Neil Duffy	9	0	5+2	0	2+0	0	0+0	0	0+0	0
	GK	(Scotland) SCO	Euan McLean	6	0	2+1	0	2+0	0	1+0	0	0+0	0
	DF	(Scotland) SCO	Jamie Bishop	31	0	27+0	0	3+0	0	1+0	0	0+0	0
	DF	(Scotland) SCO	Michael Bolochoweckyj	32	4	26+1	4	3+0	0	2+0	0	0+0	0
	DF	(Scotland) SCO	Iain Campbell	34	1	27+1	0	3+0	0	2+0	1	1+0	0
	DF	(Scotland) SCO	Alastair Dvine	1	0	0+0	0	0+0	0	0+0	0	1+0	0
	DF	(Scotland) SCO	Mark McCulloch	38	0	32+1	0	3+0	0	2+0	0	0+0	0
	DF	(Scotland) SCO	David Mowat	29	0	22+3	0	0+2	0	1+0	0	1+0	0
	DF	(Scotland) SCO	Greg Ross	25	0	23+0	0	2+0	0	0+0	0	0+0	0
	DF	(Scotland) SCO	Andy Tod	15	2	11+0	1	2+0	0	1+0	0	1+0	1
	DF	(Scotland) SCO	Stephen Tulloch	6	0	4+0	0	1+0	0	0+0	0	1+0	0
	MF	(Scotland) SCO	Scott Allan	4	1	4+0	1	0+0	0	0+0	0	0+0	0
	MF	(Scotland) SCO	Darren Brady	17	1	9+6	1	1+0	0	0+0	0	0+1	0
	MF	(Scotland) SCO	Martyn Fotheringham	32	7	19+8	7	4+0	0	1+0	0	0+0	0
	MF	(Scotland) SCO	Paul Lunan	13	0	7+2	0	2+0	0	2+0	0	0+0	0
	MF	(Scotland) SCO	Barry Sellars	33	3	18+9	1	3+1	2	1+0	0	0+1	0
	MF	(Scotland) SCO	Paul Watson	8	0	0+6	0	1+0	0	0+1	0	0+0	0
	FW	(Scotland) SCO	Bryan Deasley	40	4	19+15	3	0+4	1	1+0	0	1+0	0
	FW	(Scotland) SCO	Ryan Dow	12	3	8+3	3	1+0	0	0+0	0	0+0	0
	FW	(Scotland) SCO	Ross Campbell	39	13	24+9	11	2+1	1	2+0	1	1+0	0
	FW	(Scotland) SCO	Graham Gibson	39	2	16+16	2	3+1	0	1+1	0	1+0	0
	FW	(Scotland) SCO	Dale Hilson	36	4	27+2	3	2+2	1	1+1	0	1+0	0
	FW	(Scotland) SCO	Paul McQuade	5	1	5+0	1	0+0	0	0+0	0	0+0	0
	FW	(Scotland) SCO	Calum Smith	16	2	3+10	2	0+1	0	0+1	0	0+1	0
	FW	(Scotland) SCO	Chris Templeman	41	13	29+5	10	4+0	2	2+0	1	1+0	0

== League table ==
Pos	Team	Pld	W	D	L	GF	GA	GD	Pts	Promotion, qualification or relegation
1	Livingston (C, P)	36	25	7	4	79	33	+46	82	Promotion to the First Division
2	Ayr United (O, P)	36	18	5	13	62	55	+7	59	Qualification for the First Division play-offs
3	Forfar Athletic	36	17	8	11	50	48	+2	59	Qualification for the First Division play-offs
4	Brechin City	36	15	12	9	63	45	+18	57	Qualification for the First Division play-offs
5	East Fife	36	14	10	12	77	60	+17	52	

Source: SPFL
Rules for classification: 1) points; 2) goal difference; 3) number of goals scored.
(C) Champions; (O) Play-off winners; (P) Promoted

== Notes ==
Note1. Forfar Athletic received a random bye to the second round.
Note2. Includes other competitive competitions, including Challenge Cup and First Division play-offs
