= 2012–13 Forfar Athletic F.C. season =

Forfar Athletic
2012–13 season
- Chairman: Alastair Donald
- Manager: Dick Campbell
- Stadium: Station Park
- Second Division: 4th
- Challenge Cup: Second round (eliminated by Arbroath)
- League Cup: First round (eliminated by Partick Thistle)
- Scottish Cup: Fifth round (eliminated by Falkirk)
- Top goalscorer: League: Chris Templeman (11); All: Gavin Swankie (14); Chris Templeman (14)
- Highest home attendance: 1,562 vs Dunfermline Athletic; First Division play-offs 8 May 2013
- Lowest home attendance: 293 vs Albion Rovers; Second Division; 26 February 2013

The 2012–13 season was Forfar Athletic's third consecutive season in the Scottish Second Division, having been promoted from the Scottish Third Division at the end of the 2009–10 season. Forfar Athletic also competed in the Challenge Cup, League Cup and the Scottish Cup.

== Summary ==
=== Season ===
Forfar finished fourth in the Scottish Second Division, entering the play-offs losing 7–4 to Dunfermline Athletic on aggregate in the Semi-final and remained in the Scottish Second Division. They reached the second round of the Challenge Cup, the first round of the League Cup and the fifth round of the Scottish Cup.

== Results & fixtures ==
Win Draw Loss Postponed

=== Preseason ===
10 July 2012 Friendly	Montrose	0–3	Forfar Athletic	Links Park
		Report	Tulloch; Denholm; Swankie

14 July 2012 Friendly	Cove Rangers	2–7	Forfar Athletic	Allan Park
15:00	Goal	Report	Motion; Swankie; Dunlop; Reid	Referee: Potten

17 July 2012 Friendly	Preston Athletic	2–5	Forfar Athletic	Pennypit Park
	Martin; Cairnie	Report	Templeman; King; Swankie

21 July 2012 Friendly	Huntly	0–4	Forfar Athletic	Christie Park
15:00		Report	Campbell (pen.); Templeman (pen.); Fotheringham; Bolochoweckyj

24 July 2012 Friendly	Lochore Welfare	1–3	Forfar Athletic	Central Park
15:00	K Fotheringham	Report	Swankie; M Fotheringham

=== Scottish Second Division ===
11 August 2012	Queen of the South	2–0	Forfar Athletic	Palmerston Park
15:00	Lyle 32'; Reilly 89'	SFL Report		Attendance: 1,247; Referee: Tumilty

18 August 2012	Forfar Athletic	4–0	Stranraer	Station Park
15:00	Swankie 8'; Denholm 50'; Staunton 52'; Fotheringham 67'	SFL Report		Attendance: 449; Referee: Aitken

25 August 2012	Ayr United	2–3	Forfar Athletic	Somerset Park
15:00	Sinclair 6', 52'	SFL Report	Campbell 45' (pen.); Swankie 59'; Fotheringham 89'	Attendance: 1,094; Referee: Somers

1 September 2012	Stenhousemuir	0–4	Forfar Athletic	Ochilview Park
15:00		SFL Report	Tulloch 37'; Campbell 45' (pen.); Denholm 62'; Templeman 89'	Attendance: 673; Referee: Hilland

15 September 2012	Forfar Athletic	1–0	Brechin City	Station Park
15:00	Fotheringham 22'	SFL Report		Attendance: 708; Referee: McDermott

22 September 2012	Arbroath	1–1	Forfar Athletic	Gayfield Park
15:00	Doris 52' (pen.)	SFL Report	Bolochoweckyj 4'; Bolochoweckyj (red card) 28'; Tulloch (red card) 62'	Attendance: 940; Referee: Roache

29 September 2012	Forfar Athletic	4–2	Albion Rovers	Station Park
15:00	Campbell 13', 19', 55'; Templeman 62' (pen.)	SFL Report	McGuigan 71'; Crawford 81' (pen.)	Attendance: 452; Referee: Cook

6 October 2012	Forfar Athletic	2–3	Alloa Athletic	Station Park
15:00	Denholm 8', 79'	SFL Report	McCord 7' (pen.); Marr 22'; Gordon 83'	Attendance: 487; Referee: McKendrick

20 October 2012	East Fife	3–0	Forfar Athletic	Bayview Stadium
15:00	Muir 38'; S. Smith 89'; McManus 90'	SFL Report	Fotheringham (red card) 7'	Attendance: 541; Referee: Northcroft

27 October 2012	Stranraer	4–1	Forfar Athletic	Stair Park
15:00	Malcolm 4', 73'; Aitken 40' (red card) 90'; McKeown 90'	SFL Report	Denholm 28'	Attendance: 258; Referee: Robertson

17 November 2012	Forfar Athletic	3–2	Stenhousemuir	Station Park
15:00	Swankie 5', 23'; Motion 74'	SFL Report	McMillan 35'; Rodgers 58' (pen.)	Attendance: 432; Referee: Cook

20 November 2012	Forfar Athletic	1–5	Queen of the South	Station Park
19:30	Dunlop (red card) 21'; Swankie 25'	SFL Report	Clark 5', 49'; McGuffie 22' (pen.); Durnan 27'; Hopkirk 81'	Attendance: 391; Referee: Aitken

24 November 2012	Brechin City	4–1	Forfar Athletic	Glebe Park
15:00	Brown 15'; Byrne 52' (pen.); Jackson 61', 90'	SFL Report	McCulloch (red card) 50'; Campbell 69'	Attendance: 702; Referee: Robertson

8 December 2012	Albion Rovers	P–P	Forfar Athletic	Cliftonhill
15:00		BBC Report

15 December 2012	Forfar Athletic	1–1	Arbroath	Station Park
15:00	Hilson 74'	SFL Report	Holmes 90+2'	Attendance: 719; Referee: Brines

18 December 2012	Albion Rovers	2–3	Forfar Athletic	Cliftonhill
19:45	Boyle 35'; Howarth 40'	SFL Report	Craigen 1', 24'; Sellars 90+1'	Attendance: 249; Referee: McKendrick

22 December 2012	Alloa Athletic	2–1	Forfar Athletic	Recreation Park
15:00	McCord 4', 20'; Holmes (red card) 90'	SFL Report	Templeman 36'; Tulloch (red card) 90'	Attendance: 401; Referee: Dallas

29 December 2012	Forfar Athletic	3–2	East Fife	Station Park
15:00	Campbell 33' (pen.); Denholm 57'; Swankie 58'	SFL Report	Johnstone 7'; Willis 21'; Darren McCormack (red card) 30'	Attendance: 619; Referee: Graham

2 January 2013	Forfar Athletic	1–4	Brechin City	Station Park
15:00	Swankie 80'	SFL Report	McKenna 46'; Brown 58'; Carcary 64'; Dalziel 81'	Attendance: 903; Referee: Tumilty

5 January 2013	Stenhousemuir	2–0	Forfar Athletic	Ochilview Park
15:00	Dickson 65'; Smith 67'	SFL Sport		Attendance: 461; Referee: Aitken

12 January 2013	Forfar Athletic	2–1	Ayr United	Station Park
15:00	Robertson 9' (o.g.); Swankie 52'	SFL Report	Sinclair 48'	Attendance: 479; Referee: Hilland

19 January 2013	Queen of the South	3–1	Forfar Athletic	Palmerston Park
15:00	McGuffie 11'; Lyle 19'; Clark 70'	SFL Report	Templeman 15'	Attendance: 1,481; Referee: Colvin

26 January 2013	Arbroath	3–1	Forfar Athletic	Gayfield Park
15:00	Sibanda 8'; Bayne 17', 56'	SFL Report	Campbell 72' (pen.); Robertson (red card) 79'	Attendance: 843; Referee: Somers

9 February 2013	East Fife	1–2	Forfar Athletic	Bayview Stadium
15:00	McBride 88' (pen.)	SFL Report	Templeman 33', 71'	Attendance: 502; Referee: Charleston

16 February 2013	Forfar Athletic	0–1	Alloa Athletic	Station Park
15:00		SFL Report	Gordon 89'	Attendance: 511; Referee: Aitken

23 February 2013	Ayr United	2–1	Forfar Athletic	Somerset Park
15:00	Buchanan 19'; Donald 69'	SFL Report	Campbell 74' (pen.)	Attendance: 1,008; Referee: Brines

26 February 2013	Forfar Athletic	4–2	Albion Rovers	Station Park
19:45	Denholm 42'; Fotheringham 50'; Hilson 52'; Denholm (yellow card) 78' (yellow-red card); Malin 83'	SFL Report	Walker 12'; Innes (yellow card) 57' (yellow-red card); Andrews 65'	Attendance: 293; Referee: Robertson

2 March 2013	Forfar Athletic	3–1	Stranraer	Station Park
15:00	Malin 18'; Kader 44'; Templeman 45+1'; Bolochoweckyj (red card) 79'	SFL Report	Malcolm 63'	Attendance: 448; Referee: Robertson

9 March 2013	Brechin City	P–P	Forfar Athletic	Glebe Park
15:00		BBC Report
Note: Postponed due to a waterlogged pitch

16 March 2013	Forfar Athletic	3–3	Stenhousemuir	Station Park
15:00	Kader 10'; Denholm 77'; Campbell 37' (pen.)	SFL Report	Kean 5'; Gemmell 31', 35'; Buist (red card) 86'	Attendance: 395; Referee: Roache

23 March 2013	Albion Rovers	P–P	Forfar Athletic	Cliftonhill Stadium
15:00		BBC Report
Note: Postponed due to snow

30 March 2013	Forfar Athletic	2–4	Arbroath	Station Park
15:00	Denholm 30'; Templeman 77'	SFL Report	Doris 7'; Hamilton 56'; Travis 73'; Sheerin 89'	Attendance: 770; Referee: Anderson

2 April 2013	Albion Rovers	1–2	Forfar Athletic	Cliftonhill Stadium
19:45	Dallas 7'	SFL Report	Campbell 45+1'; Templeman 70'	Attendance: 220; Referee: Finnie

6 April 2013	Forfar Athletic	3–2	East Fife	Station Park
15:00	Malin 20', 51'; Swankie 82'	SFL Report	Sloan 45+1'; McBride 80'	Attendance: 471; Referee: Hilland

9 April 2013	Brechin City	3–4	Forfar Athletic	Glebe Park
19:45	Hay 57'; Trouten 76', 87'	SFL Report	Hilson 12'; Bolochoweckyj 33'; Malin 46'; Swankie 84'	Attendance: 581; Referee: Roache

13 April 2013	Alloa Athletic	1–0	Forfar Athletic	Recreation Park
15:00	Cawley 46'	SFL Report		Attendance: 507; Referee: Muir

20 April 2013	Forfar Athletic	0–4	Queen of the South	Station Park
15:00		SFL Report	Paton 33'; Clark 54', 56', 85'	Attendance: 555; Referee: Roache

27 April 2013	Stranraer	0–3	Forfar Athletic	Stair Park
15:00		SFL Report	Dunlop 10' (o.g.); Templeman 28'; Kader 69'	Attendance: 422; Referee: Robertson

4 May 2013	Forfar Athletic	2–1	Ayr United	Station Park
15:00	Templeman 12'; Campbell 45' (pen.)	SFL Report	Bolochoweckyj 36' (o.g.); Brownlie (red card) 44'	Attendance: 622; Referee: Charleston

=== First Division play-offs ===
8 May 2013 Play-offs SF R1	Forfar Athletic	3–1	Dunfermline Athletic	Station Park
19:45	Robertson 34'; Templeman 38', 45+1'	SFL Report	Husband 84'	Attendance: 1,562; Referee: Allan

11 May 2013 Play-offs SF R2	Dunfermline Athletic	6–1 (a.e.t.) (7–4 agg.)	Forfar Athletic	East End Park
15:00	Dunlop 36' (o.g.); Thomson 62'; Millen 81' (pen.); Smith 102'; Husband 110', 118'	SFL Report	Campbell 6'; McCulloch (red card) 15'; Dunlop (red card) 53'; Campbell (yellow card) 84' (red card)	Attendance: 4,252; Referee: O'Reilly

=== Scottish Challenge Cup ===
28 July 2012 Scottish Challenge Cup round 1	Forfar Athletic	3–2	Dunfermline Athletic	Station Park
15:00	Kader 13'; Denholm 53'; Swankie 66'	SFL Report	Wallace 16'; Barrowman 35'	Attendance: 840; Referee: Clancy

14 August 2012 Scottish Challenge Cup round 2	Arbroath	3–2	Forfar Athletic	Gayfield Park
	Currie 22'; Gribben 35', 38'	SFL Report	Swankie 30'; Gibson 44'; Campbell (yellow card) 62' (red card)	Attendance: 732; Referee: Charleston

=== Scottish League Cup ===
4 August 2012 Scottish League Cup round 1	Forfar Athletic	0–2	Partick Thistle	Station Park
15:00		SFL Report	Erskine 18'; Lawless 37'; Murray (red card) 44'	Attendance: 693; Referee: Northcroft

=== Scottish Cup ===
3 November 2012 Scottish Cup round 3	Forfar Athletic	3–3	Nairn County	Station Park
15:00	Templeman 11'; Swankie 26'; Tulloch 39'	BBC Report	MacDonald 57'; Naismith 72'; MacMillan 90+6'	Attendance: 546; Referee: Anderson

10 November 2012 Scottish Cup round 3 Replay	Nairn County	2–3	Forfar Athletic	Station Park
15:00	Gethins 79'; Cameron 88'	BBC Report	Campbell 41', 58'; Swankie 54'	Attendance: 578; Referee: Anderson

1 December 2012 Scottish Cup round 4	Forfar Athletic	2–1	Ayr United	Station Park
15:00	Robertson 59'; King 74'	BBC Report	Sinclair 16'	Attendance: Salmond; Referee: 505

2 February 2013 Scottish Cup round 5	Falkirk	4–1	Forfar Athletic	Falkirk Stadium
15:00	Taylor 19', 83'; Murdoch 68'; Weatherston 75'	BBC Report	Campbell 21' (pen.)	Attendance: 1,967; Referee: Clancy

== Player statistics ==
=== Squad ===
Last updated 11 May 2013

No.	Pos	Nat	Player	Total		Second Division		Other^{[a]}		League Cup		Scottish Cup	
No.	Pos	Nat	Player	Apps	Goals	Apps	Goals	Apps	Goals	Apps	Goals	Apps	Goals
	GK	(Scotland) SCO	Jack Hamilton	9	0	8+0	0	0+0	0	0+0	0	1+0	0
	GK	(Scotland) SCO	Darren Hill	18	0	15+0	0	2+0	0	0+0	0	1+0	0
	GK	(Scotland) SCO	David Scott	5	0	4+0	0	0+0	0	1+0	0	0+0	0
	GK	(Scotland) SCO	Derek Soutar	13	0	9+0	0	2+0	0	0+0	0	2+0	0
	DF	(Scotland) SCO	Jamie Bishop	3	0	2+0	0	0+0	0	0+0	0	0+1	0
	DF	(Scotland) SCO	Michael Bolochoweckyj	36	2	26+1	2	4+0	0	1+0	0	4+0	0
	DF	(Scotland) SCO	Iain Campbell	44	10	34+1	8	4+0	1	1+0	0	4+0	1
	DF	(Scotland) SCO	Michael Dunlop	22	0	11+4	0	3+1	0	1+0	0	1+1	0
	DF	(Faroe Islands) FRO	Odmar Faeroe	12	0	11+0	0	0+0	0	0+0	0	1+0	0
	DF	(Scotland) SCO	Gregor Fotheringham	3	0	3+0	0	0+0	0	0+0	0	0+0	0
	DF	(Scotland) SCO	Mark McCulloch	43	0	34+0	0	4+0	0	1+0	0	4+0	0
	DF	(Scotland) SCO	Duncan Reid	1	0	0+0	0	0+0	0	0+0	0	0+1	0
	DF	(Scotland) SCO	Stephen Tulloch	25	2	16+4	1	1+0	0	0+0	0	4+0	1
	DF	(Scotland) SCO	Scott Webster	1	0	0+1	0	0+0	0	0+0	0	0+0	0
	MF	(Scotland) SCO	Jordon Brown	18	0	9+6	0	0+2	0	0+0	0	0+1	0
	MF	(England) ENG	James Craigen	11	2	10+0	2	0+0	0	0+0	0	1+0	0
	MF	(Scotland) SCO	Danny Denholm	33	10	25+3	9	2+0	1	1+0	0	1+1	0
	MF	(Scotland) SCO	Keith Gibson	7	1	4+0	0	2+0	1	1+0	0	0+0	0
	MF	(Scotland) SCO	Connor Gray	1	0	0+1	0	0+0	0	0+0	0	0+0	0
	MF	(Scotland) SCO	Martyn Fotheringham	32	4	19+7	4	1+1	0	0+1	0	2+1	0
	MF	(Scotland) SCO	Liam Keiller	1	0	0+1	0	0+0	0	0+0	0	0+0	0
	MF	(Scotland) SCO	Gavin Malin	23	5	15+5	5	2+0	0	0+0	0	1+0	0
	MF	(Scotland) SCO	Kevin Motion	20	1	7+7	1	0+2	0	0+1	0	2+1	0
	MF	(Scotland) SCO	Willie Robertson	23	2	14+6	0	2+0	1	0+0	0	1+0	1
	MF	(Scotland) SCO	Barry Sellars	17	1	5+9	1	0+1	0	0+0	0	0+2	0
	MF	(Scotland) SCO	Alastair Smith	1	0	0+1	0	0+0	0	0+0	0	0+0	0
	MF	(Scotland) SCO	Gavin Thomson	1	0	0+1	0	0+0	0	0+0	0	0+0	0
	FW	(Scotland) SCO	Ross Campbell	38	6	21+8	4	3+1	0	0+1	0	4+0	2
	FW	(Scotland) SCO	Dale Hilson	23	3	19+1	3	2+0	0	0+0	0	1+0	0
	FW	(Scotland) SCO	Omar Kader	30	4	8+17	3	1+2	1	1+0	0	0+1	0
	FW	(Scotland) SCO	Charlie King	27	1	1+19	0	2+1	0	1+0	0	1+2	1
	FW	(Scotland) SCO	Gavin Swankie	41	14	31+1	10	4+0	2	1+0	0	4+0	2
	FW	(Scotland) SCO	Chris Templeman	44	14	34+1	11	3+1	2	1+0	0	4+0	1
	FW	(Scotland) SCO	Graham Gibson	1	0	1+0	0	0+0	0	0+0	0	0+0	0

a. Includes other competitive competitions, including the play-offs and the Challenge Cup.

=== Disciplinary record ===
Includes all competitive matches.

Last updated 11 May 2013

Nation	Position	Name	Second Division		Other		League Cup		Scottish Cup		Total	
Nation	Position	Name	Booked	Sent off (straight red)	Booked	Sent off (straight red)	Booked	Sent off (straight red)	Booked	Sent off (straight red)	Booked	Sent off (straight red)
(Scotland)	GK	Jack Hamilton	0	0	0	0	0	0	0	0	0	0
(Scotland)	GK	Darren Hill	1	0	0	0	0	0	0	0	1	0
(Scotland)	GK	David Scott	0	0	0	0	0	0	0	0	0	0
(Scotland)	GK	Derek Soutar	1	0	0	0	0	0	0	0	1	0
(Scotland)	DF	Jamie Bishop	1	0	0	0	0	0	0	0	1	0
(Scotland)	DF	Michael Bolochoweckyj	7	2	3	0	1	0	1	0	12	2
(Scotland)	DF	Iain Campbell	4	0	3	2	0	0	1	0	8	2
(Scotland)	DF	Michael Dunlop	1	1	0	1	0	0	0	0	1	2
(Faroe Islands)	DF	Odmar Faeroe	1	0	0	0	0	0	0	0	1	0
(Scotland)	DF	Gregor Fotheringham	0	0	0	0	0	0	0	0	0	0
(Scotland)	DF	Mark McCulloch	5	1	1	1	0	0	1	0	7	2
(Scotland)	DF	Duncan Reid	0	0	0	0	0	0	0	0	0	0
(Scotland)	DF	Stephen Tulloch	4	2	1	0	0	0	0	0	5	2
(Scotland)	DF	Scott Webster	0	0	0	0	0	0	0	0	0	0
(Scotland)	MF	Jordon Brown	1	0	1	0	0	0	0	0	2	0
(England)	MF	James Craigen	3	0	0	0	0	0	0	0	3	0
(Scotland)	MF	Danny Denholm	3	1	0	0	0	0	0	0	3	1
(Scotland)	MF	Keith Gibson	1	0	0	0	0	0	0	0	1	0
(England)	MF	Connor Gray	1	0	0	0	0	0	0	0	1	0
(Scotland)	MF	Martyn Fotheringham	4	1	1	0	0	0	0	0	5	1
(Scotland)	MF	Liam Keiller	0	0	0	0	0	0	0	0	0	0
(Scotland)	MF	Gavin Malin	2	0	0	0	0	0	0	0	2	0
(Scotland)	MF	Kevin Motion	2	0	1	0	0	0	1	0	4	0
(Scotland)	MF	Willie Robertson	5	1	1	0	0	0	1	0	7	1
(Scotland)	MF	Barry Sellars	0	0	0	0	0	0	0	0	0	0
(Scotland)	MF	Alastair Smith	0	0	0	0	0	0	0	0	0	0
(Scotland)	MF	Gavin Thomson	0	0	0	0	0	0	0	0	0	0
(Scotland)	FW	Ross Campbell	3	0	2	0	0	0	0	0	5	0
(Scotland)	FW	Dale Hilson	7	0	0	0	0	0	0	0	7	0
(Scotland)	FW	Omar Kader	0	0	0	0	0	0	0	0	0	0
(Scotland)	FW	Charlie King	1	0	0	0	0	0	0	0	1	0
(Scotland)	FW	Gavin Swankie	6	0	0	0	0	0	0	0	6	0
(Scotland)	FW	Chris Templeman	3	0	2	0	0	0	1	0	6	0
(Scotland)	FW	Graham Gibson	0	0	0	0	0	0	0	0	0	0

== Team statistics ==
=== League table ===
Pos	Team	Pld	W	D	L	GF	GA	GD	Pts	Promotion, qualification or relegation
2	Alloa Athletic (O, P)	36	20	7	9	62	35	+27	67	Qualification for the First Division play-offs
3	Brechin City	36	19	4	13	72	59	+13	61	Qualification for the First Division play-offs
4	Forfar Athletic	36	17	3	16	67	74	−7	54	Qualification for the First Division play-offs
5	Arbroath	36	15	7	14	47	57	−10	52	
6	Stenhousemuir	36	12	13	11	59	59	0	49	

Source: SPFL Archive
Rules for classification: 1) points; 2) goal difference; 3) number of goals scored.
(O) Play-off winners; (P) Promoted

=== Division summary ===
Round	1	2	3	4	5	6	7	8	9	10	11	12	13	14	15	16	17	18	19	20	21	22	23	24	25	26	27	28	29	30	31	32	33	34	35	36
Ground	A	H	A	A	H	A	H	H	A	A	H	H	A	H	A	A	H	H	A	H	A	A	A	H	A	H	H	H	H	A	H	A	A	H	A	H
Result	L	W	W	W	W	D	W	L	L	L	W	L	L	D	W	L	W	L	L	W	L	L	W	L	L	W	W	D	L	W	W	W	L	L	W	W
Position	10	5	3	2	2	2	2	2	2	3	3	3	4	3	3	3	4	4	4	4	4	5	5	5	5	2	4	4	5	4	5	4	4	5	5	4

Updated to match(es) played on 11 May 2013. Source:
A = Away; H = Home; W = Win; D = Draw; L = Loss

== Transfers ==
=== Players in ===
Player	From	Fee
(Scotland) Keith Gibson	(Scotland) Arbroath	Free
(Scotland) Gavin Swankie	(Scotland) Arbroath	Free
(Scotland) Charlie King	(Scotland) Brechin City	Free
(Scotland) David Scott	(Scotland) Brechin City	Free
(Scotland) Derek Soutar	(Scotland) Formartine United	Free
(Scotland) Danny Denholm	(Scotland) Stirling University	Free
(Scotland) Michael Dunlop	(Scotland) Aberdeen	Free
(Scotland) Omar Kader	(Scotland) Spartans	Free
(Faroe Islands) Odmar Faeroe	(Faroe Islands) B36 Tórshavn	Free
(England) James Craigen	(Scotland) Partick Thistle	Loan
(Scotland) Jack Hamilton	(Scotland) Heart of Midlothian	Loan
(Scotland) Willie Robertson	(Scotland) Dundee United	Loan
(Scotland) Dale Hilson	(Scotland) Dundee United	Loan
(Scotland) Jordon Brown	(Scotland) Aberdeen	Loan
(Scotland) Darren Hill	(Scotland) Arbroath	Free
(Scotland) Gregor Fotheringham	(Scotland) Rangers	Loan

=== Players out ===
Player	To	Fee
(Scotland) Bradley Coyne	(Scotland) Stirling Albion	Free
(Scotland) Graham Gibson	(Scotland) Ballingry Rovers	Free
(Scotland) Craig Wilson	Free agent	Free
(Scotland) Greg Ross	(Scotland) Stenhousemuir	Free
(Scotland) Kevin Byers	(Scotland) Ballingry Rovers	Free
(Scotland) Chris Hegarty	(Scotland) Ballingry Rovers	Free
(Scotland) Greg Paterson	(Scotland) Linlithgow Rose	Free
(Scotland) David Mowat	(Scotland) Ballingry Rovers	Free
(Scotland) Jamie Bishop	(Scotland) Stirling Albion	Loan
(Scotland) Jamie Bishop	(Scotland) Stirling Albion	Free
(Scotland) Kevin Motion	(Scotland) Spartans	Loan
(Scotland) David Scott	(Scotland) Linlithgow Rose	Free
