= 2011–12 Forfar Athletic F.C. season =

Forfar Athletic
2011–12 season
- Chairman: Neill Wilson
- Manager: Dick Campbell
- Stadium: Station Park
- Scottish Second Division: 7th
- Challenge Cup: Second round (eliminated by Greenock Morton)
- League Cup: Second round (eliminated by Queen of the South)
- Scottish Cup: Fourth round (eliminated by Aberdeen)
- Top goalscorer: League: Chris Templeman (16); All: Chris Templeman (19)
- Highest home attendance: 908 vs. Arbroath, 15 October 2011
- Lowest home attendance: 284 vs. Dumbarton, 15 February 2012

The 2011–12 season was Forfar Athletic's second consecutive season in the Scottish Second Division, having been promoted from the Scottish Third Division at the end of the 2009–10 season. Forfar Athletic also competed in the Challenge Cup, League Cup and the Scottish Cup.

== Summary ==
Forfar finished seventh in the Second Division. They reached the second round of the Challenge Cup, the second round of the League Cup and the fourth round of the Scottish Cup.

== Results and fixtures ==
=== Pre-season ===
Win Draw Loss Postponed

2 July 2011 Friendly	Forfar Athletic	0–2	Dundee United	Station Park, Forfar
		DUFC Report	Bishop 33' (o.g.); Russell 64'	Attendance: 957; Referee: Craig Charleston

5 July 2011 Friendly	Forfar Athletic	1–1	Montrose	Station Park
	Campbell 75'	Forfar Report	Crawford 60' (pen.)

12 July 2011 Friendly	Forfar Athletic	0–1	Spartans	Station Park
		Forfar Report	Kadik	Attendance: 215; Referee: Andrew Dallas

16 July 2011 Friendly	Forfar Athletic	0–3	Aberdeen	Station Park
		AFC Report	Vernon 18' (pen.); Jack 68'; Milsom 80'	Attendance: 874; Referee: Matt Northcroft

=== Scottish Second Division ===
6 August 2011	Forfar	2–2	Cowdenbeath	Station Park
	McCulloch 58'; Templeman 62' (pen.)	BBC Report	Ramsay 11'; Coult 78'	Attendance: 469; Referee: Gary Hilland

13 August 2011	Albion Rovers	1–0	Forfar Athletic	Cliftonhill
	Love 89'	BBC Report		Attendance: 352; Referee: John McKendrick

20 August 2011	Forfar Athletic	2–3	Stenhousemuir	Station Park
	Templeman 55'; Mowat 57'	BBC Report	Ferguson 22'; Kean 25'; Thomson 62'	Attendance: 372; Referee: Mike Tumilty

27 August 2011	Forfar Athletic	3–2	Airdrie United	Station Park
	Crawford 11', 43'; Fotheringham 64'	BBC Sport	Stephenson 23'; Lynch 29'	Attendance: 432; Referee: Beaton

10 September 2011	Brechin City	0–1	Forfar Athletic	Glebe Park
15:00	Carcary (red card) 85'	BBC Report	Templeman 61'	Attendance: 651; Referee: Northcroft

17 September 2011	Stirling Albion	2–4	Forfar Athletic	Doubletree Dunblane Stadium
	Davieson 45' (pen.); Smith 83'	BBC Report	Shaughnessy 34'; Templeman 61', 78'; Low 75'	Attendance: 551; Referee: Charleston

24 September 2011	Forfar Athletic	0–2	Dumbarton	Station Park
		BBC Report	Winters 32'; Prunty 61'	Attendance: 493; Referee: Euan Norris

1 October 2011	East Fife	4–3	Forfar Athletic	Bayview Stadium
	Ovenstone 15'; Muir 32'; Ogleby 44'; Wallace 83'	BBC Report	Byers 19'; Ovenstone 40' (o.g.); Shaughnessy 53'; McHugh (red card) 76'	Attendance: 533; Referee: Clancy

15 October 2011	Forfar Athletic	1–1	Arbroath	Station Park
15:00	Bolocheweckyj (yellow card) 35' (red card); Shaughnessy 82'	BBC Report	Sibanda 12'	Attendance: 908; Referee: Roache

22 October 2011	Cowdenbeath	3–1	Forfar Athletic	Central Park
	Coult 60'; Stewart 68', 72'	BBC Report	Low 75'	Attendance: 339; Referee: Northcroft

29 October 2011	Forfar Athletic	0–2	Albion Rovers	Station Park
		BBC Report	Love 45', 58'	Attendance: 436; Referee: Tumilty

5 November 2011	Forfar Athletic	0–0	Brechin City	Station Park
		SFL Report		Attendance: 661; Referee: McKendrick

12 November 2011	Airdrie United	4–4	Forfar Athletic	Excelsior Stadium
	Donnelly 32', 58', 73'; Boyle 82'	BBC Report	Templeman 17', 64'; Motion 62'; Byers 79'	Attendance: 635; Referee: Winter

26 November 2011	Forfar Athletic	P–P	Stirling Albion	Station Park

3 December 2011	Dumbarton	1–1	Forfar Athletic	Strathclyde Homes Stadium
	Walker 16'	SFL Report	Motion 90+3'	Attendance: 443; Referee: Richmond

10 December 2011	Forfar Athletic	P–P	East Fife	Station Park

17 December 2011	Arbroath	P–P	Forfar Athletic	Gayfield Park

26 December 2011	Forfar Athletic	2–3	Airdrie United	Station Park
14:00	Templeman 15'; Motion 18'; Hegarty (red card) 67'	SFL Report	Lynch 42'; McLaren 45'; Morton 90'	Attendance: 579; Referee: Clancy

2 January 2012	Brechin City	2–1	Forfar Athletic	Glebe Park
15:00	McManus 51', 59'	SFL Report	Templeman 39'	Attendance: 776; Referee: McDermott

14 January 2012	Stenhousemuir	2–3	Forfar Athletic	Ochilview Park
15:00	McMillan 42'; McCulloch 71' (o.g.)	SFL Report	Templeman 43', 80'; Fotheringham 90'	Attendance: 454; Referee: Roache

21 January 2012	Forfar Athletic	1–0	Cowdenbeath	Station Park
15:00	Low 45'	SFL Report		Attendance: 475; Referee: Finnie

24 January 2012	Forfar Athletic	2–2	Stirling Albion	Station Park
19:30	Coyne 21', 60'	SFL Report	McSorley 79'; Davidson 88'	Attendance: 361; Referee: McKendrick,

28 January 2012	Forfar Athletic	P–P	Dumbarton	Station Park
15:00

4 February 2012	Stirling Albion	P–P	Forfar Athletic	Forthbank Stadium
15:00

11 February 2012	Forfar Athletic	2–4	Arbroath	Station Park
15:00	Fotheringham 80', 89'	SFL Report	Malcolm 17'; Samuel 41'; Sibanda 75'; Sheerin 82'	Attendance: 794; Referee: McKendrick

14 February 2012	Forfar Athletic	1–1	Dumbarton	Station Park
19:45	Hilson 30'	SFL Report	Prunty 44'	Attendance: 284; Referee: Clancy

18 February 2012	East Fife	4–0	Forfar Athletic	Bayview Stadium
15:00	Sloan 11' (Penalty), 15'; Hislop 36'; Wallace 70'	SFL Report		Attendance: 536; Referee: Charleston

22 February 2012	Arbroath	4–1	Forfar Athletic	Gayfield Park
19:45	Samuel 20'; Doris 44', 45', 72'	SFL Report	Coyne 13'	Attendance: 789; Referee: Conroy

25 February 2012	Albion Rovers	2–2	Forfar Athletic	Cliftonhill
15:00	Gemmell 5'; Love 78'	SFL Report	Hilson 2'; Templeman 22'	Attendance: 312; Referee: Aitken

28 February 2012	Forfar Athletic	3–2	East Fife	Station Park
19:45	Low 4'; Templeman 15' (Penalty), 64'	SFL Report	Sloan 19' (Penalty); Wallace 90' (Penalty)	Attendance: 432; Referee: Collum

3 March 2012	Forfar Athletic	1–2	Stenhousemuir	Station Park
15:00	Low 56'	SFL Report	Ferguson 13'; Kean 53'	Attendance: 374; Referee: Northcroft

6 March 2012	Stirling Albion	2–2	Forfar Athletic	Doubletree Dunblane Stadium
19:45	Ferry 18'; McSorley 88'	SFL Report	Tulloch 62'; Templeman 65'; Hegarty (red card) 67'	Attendance: 371; Referee: Beaton

10 March 2012	Forfar Athletic	4–1	Brechin City	Station Park
15:00	Fotheringham 20', 67' (Penalty); Low 32'; Byers 43'	SFL Report; Report	Buist 45'	Attendance: 584; Referee: Colvin

17 March 2012	Airdrie United	3–0	Forfar Athletic	Excelsior Stadium
15:00	Bain 54'; Lovering 75' (Penalty); McLaren 86'	SFL Report		Attendance: 621; Referee: Somers

24 March 2012	Forfar Athletic	4–3	Stirling Albion	Station Park
15:00	Fotheringham 12'; Coyne 15'; Templeman 23'; Byers 90'	SFL Report	Kelbie 22'; Smith 63'; Ferry 89'	Attendance: 462; Referee: Roache

31 March 2012	Dumbarton	1–0	Forfar Athletic	Dumbarton Football Stadium
15:00	Paterson 56' (o.g.)	Forfar Report		Attendance: 513; Referee: O'Reilly

7 April 2012	Forfar Athletic	1–4	East Fife	Station Park
15:00	Byers 32'	SFL Report	Dalziel 15', 90'; Wallace 18', 53'	Attendance: 559; Referee: McDermott

14 April 2012	Arbroath	0–1	Forfar Athletic	Gayfield Park
15:00		SFL Report	Ross 60'	Attendance: 998; Referee: Allan

21 April 2012	Cowdenbeath	2–0	Forfar Athletic	Central Park
15:00	McKenzie 72', 83'	SFL Report		Attendance: 930; Referee: Anderson

28 April 2012	Forfar Athletic	4–0	Albion Rovers	Station Park
15:00	Byers 3', 30'; Ross 28'; Hilson (red card) 62'; Coyne 84'	SFL Report	Stevenson (red card) 11'; Boyle (red card) 45'	Attendance: 554; Referee: Somers

5 May 2012	Stenhousemuir	1–2	Forfar Athletic	Ochilview Park, Stenhousemuir
15:00	Anderson 15'	SFL Report	McMillan 4' (Own goal); Fotheringham 22'	Attendance: 759; Referee: Aitken

=== Scottish Cup ===
19 November 2011 Scottish Cup round 3	Stranraer	1–1	Forfar Athletic	Stair Park
15:00	Gallagher (red card) 20'; McKeown 89'	BBC Report	Templeman 32'	Attendance: 340; Referee: Colvin

26 November 2011 Scottish Cup round 3 Replay	Forfar Athletic	3–0	Stranraer	Station Park
15;00	Ross 67'; Templeman 76'; Gibson 87'	BBC Sport		Attendance: 423; Referee: Colvin

7 January 2012 Scottish Cup round 4	Forfar Athletic	0–4	Aberdeen	Station Park
15:00		BBC Sport	Vernon 31'; Chalali 41'; Fallon 71'; Megginson 84'	Attendance: 3,747; Referee: Colvin

=== Scottish League Cup ===
30 July 2011 Scottish League Cup round 1	Forfar Athletic	2–0	Peterhead	Station Park, Forfar
	Crawford 43'; Templeman 61'	BBC Report		Attendance: 452; Referee: Des Roache

23 August 2011 Scottish League Cup round 2	Queen of the South	3–0	Forfar Athletic	Palmerston Park, Dumfries
19:45	Brighton 29'; Johnston 58'; Clark 61'	BBC Sport		Attendance: 1,008; Referee: Willie Collum

=== Scottish Challenge Cup ===
23 July 2011 Scottish Challenge Cup round 1	Forfar Athletic	1–1 (a.e.t.) (5–4 p)	Buckie Thistle	Station Park, Forfar
	Gibson 29'	BBC Report	MacMillan 33'	Attendance: 416; Referee: John Beaton

9 August 2011 Scottish Challenge Cup round 2	Forfar Athletic	0–5	Greenock Morton	Station Park, Forfar
		BBC Report	O'Brien 56'; Weatherson 59'; MacDonald 61', 75'; Campbell 78'	Attendance: 448; Referee: Matt Northcroft

== Player statistics ==
=== Squad ===
Last updated 5 May 2012

No.	Pos	Nat	Player	Total		Scottish Second Division		Scottish Cup		League Cup		Challenge Cup	
No.	Pos	Nat	Player	Apps	Goals	Apps	Goals	Apps	Goals	Apps	Goals	Apps	Goals
	GK	(Scotland) SCO	Grant Adam	1	0	0+0	0	0+0	0	1+0	0	0+0	0
	GK	(Scotland) SCO	Jamie Langfield	2	0	2+0	0	0+0	0	0+0	0	0+0	0
	GK	(Scotland) SCO	Anton Mordente	0	0	0+0	0	0+0	0	0+0	0	0+0	0
	GK	(England) ENG	Adam McHugh	7	0	6+0	0	0+0	0	1+0	0	0+0	0
	GK	(Scotland) SCO	Marc McCallum	8	0	8+0	0	0+0	0	0+0	0	0+0	0
	GK	(Scotland) SCO	Paul McKane	0	0	0+0	0	0+0	0	0+0	0	0+0	0
	GK	(Scotland) SCO	Greg Paterson	26	0	20+1	0	3+0	0	0+0	0	2+0	0
	DF	(Scotland) SCO	Jamie Bishop	11	0	8+0	0	2+0	0	0+0	0	1+0	0
	DF	(Scotland) SCO	Michael Bolochoweckyj	26	0	16+8	0	0+1	0	1+0	0	0+0	0
	DF	(Scotland) SCO	Iain Campbell	27	0	21+1	0	3+0	0	1+0	0	1+0	0
	DF	(Scotland) SCO	Chris Hegarty	29	0	20+4	0	2+0	0	1+0	0	1+1	0
	DF	(Scotland) SCO	Mark McCulloch	35	1	30+0	1	1+0	0	2+0	0	2+0	0
	DF	(Scotland) SCO	David Mowat	30	1	20+3	1	3+0	0	2+0	0	1+1	0
	DF	(Scotland) SCO	Greg Ross	37	3	27+3	2	3+0	1	2+0	0	2+0	0
	DF	(Scotland) SCO	Craig Wilson	21	0	10+6	0	1+1	0	2+0	0	1+0	0
	DF	(Scotland) SCO	Stephen Tulloch	18	1	12+2	1	1+0	0	1+1	0	1+0	0
	DF	(Republic of Ireland) IRL	Joe Shaughnessy	28	3	26+0	3	2+0	0	0+0	0	0+0	0
	MF	(Scotland) SCO	Bradley Skelly	0	0	0+0	0	0+0	0	0+0	0	0+0	0
	MF	(Scotland) SCO	Duncan Reid	1	0	0+1	0	0+0	0	0+0	0	0+0	0
	MF	(Scotland) SCO	Kevin Byers	35	7	13+16	7	0+2	0	1+1	0	1+1	0
	MF	(Scotland) SCO	Martyn Fotheringham	33	8	22+4	8	3+0	0	2+0	0	2+0	0
	MF	(Scotland) SCO	Kevin Motion	32	3	13+12	3	0+3	0	1+1	0	1+1	0
	MF	(Scotland) SCO	Nicky Low	31	6	28+1	6	2+0	0	0+0	0	0+0	0
	MF	(Scotland) SCO	Jordan Brown	4	0	3+1	0	0+0	0	0+0	0	0+0	0
	MF	(Scotland) SCO	Barry Sellars	4	0	2+2	0	0+0	0	0+0	0	0+0	0
	FW	(Scotland) SCO	Ross Campbell	29	0	12+11	0	3+0	0	0+2	0	1+0	0
	FW	(Scotland) SCO	Stevie Crawford	15	3	11+0	2	0+0	0	2+0	1	2+0	0
	FW	(Scotland) SCO	Graham Gibson	22	2	4+13	0	0+2	1	0+1	0	1+1	1
	FW	(Scotland) SCO	Chris Templeman	40	19	32+1	16	3+0	2	2+0	1	2+0	0
	FW	(Scotland) SCO	Dale Hilson	21	2	20+0	2	1+0	0	0+0	0	0+0	0
	FW	(Scotland) SCO	Bradley Coyne	16	5	9+7	5	0+0	0	0+0	0	0+0	0
	FW	(Scotland) SCO	Lee Bryce	3	0	0+3	0	0+0	0	0+0	0	0+0	0

=== Disciplinary record ===
Includes all competitive matches.

Last updated 5 May 2012

Nation	Position	Name	Scottish Second Division		Scottish Cup		League Cup		Challenge Cup		Total	
Nation	Position	Name	Booked	Sent off (straight red)	Booked	Sent off (straight red)	Booked	Sent off (straight red)	Booked	Sent off (straight red)	Booked	Sent off (straight red)
(Scotland)	GK	Grant Adam	0	0	0	0	0	0	0	0	0	0
(Scotland)	GK	Jamie Langfield	0	0	0	0	0	0	0	0	0	0
(Scotland)	GK	Anton Mordente	0	0	0	0	0	0	0	0	0	0
(England)	GK	Adam McHugh	0	1	0	0	0	0	0	0	0	1
(Scotland)	GK	Marc McCallum	0	0	0	0	0	0	0	0	0	0
(Scotland)	GK	Paul McKane	0	0	0	0	0	0	0	0	0	0
(Scotland)	GK	Greg Paterson	1	0	0	0	0	0	0	0	1	0
(Scotland)	DF	Jamie Bishop	2	0	0	0	0	0	0	0	2	0
(Scotland)	DF	Michael Bolochoweckyj	9	1	0	0	0	0	0	0	9	1
(Scotland)	DF	Iain Campbell	7	0	1	0	0	0	0	0	8	0
(Scotland)	DF	Chris Hegarty	9	2	1	0	0	0	1	0	11	2
(Scotland)	DF	Mark McCulloch	2	0	0	0	0	0	0	0	2	0
(Scotland)	DF	David Mowat	2	0	0	0	0	0	0	0	2	0
(Scotland)	DF	Greg Ross	6	0	0	0	0	0	1	0	7	0
(Scotland)	DF	Craig Wilson	2	0	0	0	1	0	0	0	3	0
(Scotland)	DF	Stephen Tulloch	3	0	0	0	0	0	0	0	3	0
(Scotland)	DF	Joe Shaughnessy	4	0	0	0	0	0	0	0	4	0
(Scotland)	MF	Bradley Skelly	0	0	0	0	0	0	0	0	0	0
(Scotland)	MF	Duncan Reid	0	0	0	0	0	0	0	0	0	0
(Scotland)	MF	Kevin Byers	0	0	1	0	0	0	0	0	1	0
(Scotland)	MF	Martyn Fotheringham	6	0	1	0	0	0	0	0	7	0
(Scotland)	MF	Kevin Motion	3	0	0	0	0	0	0	0	3	0
(Scotland)	MF	Nicky Low	4	0	0	0	0	0	0	0	4	0
(Scotland)	MF	Jordan Brown	0	0	0	0	0	0	0	0	0	0
(Scotland)	MF	Barry Sellars	0	0	0	0	0	0	0	0	0	0
(Scotland)	FW	Ross Campbell	3	0	0	0	0	0	0	0	3	0
(Scotland)	FW	Stevie Crawford	0	0	0	0	0	0	0	0	0	0
(Scotland)	FW	Graham Gibson	0	0	0	0	0	0	0	0	0	0
(Scotland)	FW	Chris Templeman	4	0	0	0	0	0	0	0	4	0
(Scotland)	FW	Dale Hilson	5	1	0	0	0	0	0	0	5	1
(Scotland)	FW	Bradley Coyne	1	0	0	0	0	0	0	0	1	0
(Scotland)	FW	Lee Bryce	0	0	0	0	0	0	0	0	0	0

== Team statistics ==
=== League table ===
Pos	Team	Pld	W	D	L	GF	GA	GD	Pts	Promotion, qualification or relegation
5	Stenhousemuir	36	15	6	15	54	49	+5	51	
6	East Fife	36	14	6	16	55	57	−2	48	
7	Forfar Athletic	36	11	9	16	59	72	−13	42	
8	Brechin City	36	10	11	15	47	62	−15	41	
9	Albion Rovers (O)	36	10	7	19	43	66	−23	37	Qualification for Second Division play-offs

Source: SPFL Archive
Rules for classification: 1) points; 2) goal difference; 3) number of goals scored.
(O) Play-off winners

== Transfers ==
=== Players in ===
Player	From	Fee
(Scotland) Greg Paterson	(Scotland) Dunfermline Athletic	Free
(Scotland) Chris Hegarty	(Scotland) Montrose F.C.	Free
(Scotland) Kevin Byers	(Scotland) Brechin City	Free
(Scotland) Kevin Motion	(Scotland) Alloa Athletic	Free
(Scotland) Stevie Crawford	(Scotland) Cowdenbeath	Free
(Scotland) Craig Wilson	(Scotland) Raith Rovers	Free
(Scotland) Grant Adam	(Scotland) Rangers	Loan
(England) Adam McHugh	(Scotland) St Mirren	Loan
(Republic of Ireland) Joe Shaughnessy	(Scotland) Aberdeen	Loan
(Scotland) Nicky Low	(Scotland) Aberdeen	Loan
(Scotland) Jordon Brown	(Scotland) Aberdeen	Loan
(Scotland) Jamie Langfield	(Scotland) Aberdeen	Loan
(Scotland) Dale Hilson	(Scotland) Dundee United	Loan
(Scotland) Marc McCallum	(Scotland) Dundee United	Loan
(Scotland) Bradley Coyne	(Scotland) St Mirren	Free
(Scotland) Barry Sellars	(Scotland) Peterhead	Free
(Scotland) Paul McKane	(Scotland) Airdrie United	Free

=== Players out ===
Player	To	Fee
(Scotland) Calum Smith	(Scotland) Linlithgow Rose	Free
(Scotland) Paul Watson	(Scotland) Peterhead	Free
(Scotland) Darren Brady	(Scotland) Pollok	Free
(Scotland) Barry Sellars	(Scotland) Peterhead	Free
(Scotland) Bryan Deasley	(Scotland) Peterhead	Free
(Scotland) Grant Adam	(Scotland) Rangers	Loan Return
(Scotland) Jamie Bishop	(Scotland) Peterhead	Loan
(Scotland) Stephen Tulloch	(Scotland) Berwick Rangers	Loan
