= Iain Campbell (footballer) =

Scottish footballer (born 1985)

Personal information
- Date of birth: 28 June 1985 (age 41)
- Place of birth: Kirkcaldy, Scotland
- Height: 1.75 m (5 ft 9 in)
- Position: Defender

Senior career*
Years	Team	Apps	(Gls)
2002–2006	Dunfermline Athletic	31	(1)
2006–2008	Kilmarnock	0	(0)
2007	→ Ross County (loan)	10	(0)
2008	→ Clyde (loan)	4	(0)
2008–2009	Alloa Athletic	30	(2)
2009–2014	Forfar Athletic	148	(13)
2014–2015	Cowdenbeath	13	(0)
2015	→ Forfar Athletic (loan)	15	(0)
2015–2016	Forfar Athletic	23	(4)
2016–2022	Montrose	77	(3)
- * Club domestic league appearances and goals

Iain Campbell (born 28 June 1985) is a Scottish former professional footballer. After beginning his career at Dunfermline Athletic, he played for Kilmarnock, Ross County, Clyde, Alloa Athletic, Cowdenbeath, Forfar Athletic and Montrose.

== Career ==
Born in Kirkcaldy, Campbell started his career with Dunfermline Athletic. He made 36 appearances and scored one goal against Motherwell at Fir Park on 29 April 2006, in a 3–2 win. In August 2006, he moved to fellow SPL club Kilmarnock for an undisclosed fee. He did not make an appearance for Killie, and was sent on loan to Ross County in August 2007 until the end of the year.

On 31 January 2008, Campbell was loaned out again, this time to Clyde until May 2008. He made his debut in a 3–1 defeat by Stirling Albion on 2 February 2008. He was released by Kilmarnock in June 2008 and joined Alloa Athletic. He joined Forfar Athletic a year later.

In June 2014, Campbell signed for Scottish Championship club Cowdenbeath. Campbell returned to Forfar Athletic on 15 January 2015, signing on a one-month loan. Campbell joined Forfar permanently in July 2015, staying with the club for one season before moving to Montrose at the start of the 2016–17 season, initially on a one-month deal to provide cover for injured defenders Michael Bolochoweckyj and Chris Hegarty. He was part of the squad which won the 2017–18 Scottish League Two title and subsequently participated in the promotion play-offs from League One the following year.

== Personal life ==
He is the son of Dick Campbell who has managed Dunfermline Athletic, Brechin City, Partick Thistle and Ross County and is currently manager of Arbroath. Iain has been managed twice during his career by his father, at Ross County and Forfar Athletic. His older brother Ross is also a footballer, a forward who was a teammate at both Forfar and Montrose.

== Career statistics ==
As of 07:56, 4 December 2019 (UTC)

Appearances and goals by club, season and competition
Club	Season	League			Scottish Cup		League Cup		Other		Total	
Club	Season	Division	Apps	Goals	Apps	Goals	Apps	Goals	Apps	Goals	Apps	Goals
Dunfermline Athletic	2004–05	Premier League	13	0	2	0	0	0	0	0	15	0
Dunfermline Athletic	2005–06	Premier League	17	1	1	0	2	0	—		20	1
Dunfermline Athletic	2006–07	Premier League	1	0	0	0	0	0	—		1	0
Dunfermline Athletic	Dunfermline total		31	1	3	0	2	0	0	0	36	1
Kilmarnock	2007–08	Premier League	0	0	0	0	0	0	—		0	0
Clyde (loan)	2007–08	First Division	4	0	0	0	0	0	0	0	4	0
Alloa Athletic	2008–09	Second Division	30	2	3	0	1	0	1 (Note: Appearance in the Scottish Challenge Cup)	0	35	2
Forfar Athletic	2009–10	Third Division	32	2	1	0	2	0	4 (Note: Two appearances in the Scottish Challenge Cup and two in the Second Division play-offs)	0	39	2
Forfar Athletic	2010–11	Second Division	27	0	0	0	1	0	2 (Note: Appearances in the First Division play-offs)	0	30	0
Forfar Athletic	2011–12	Second Division	22	0	1	0	1	0	0	0	24	0
Forfar Athletic	2012–13	Second Division	35	8	2	1	1	0	4 (Note: Two appearances in the Scottish Challenge Cup; two appearances and a goal in the First Division play-offs)	1	42	10
Forfar Athletic	2013–14	League One	31	2	4	0	2	1	0	0	37	3
Forfar Athletic	Forfar Athletic total I		147	12	8	1	7	1	10	1	172	15
Cowdenbeath	2014–15	Championship	13	0	0	0	2	0	1	0	16	0
Forfar Athletic (loan)	2014–15	League One	15	0	0	0	0	0	0	0	15	0
Forfar Athletic	2015–16	League One	23	4	4	1	2	0	2	1	31	6
Forfar Athletic	Forfar Athletic total II		38	4	4	1	2	0	2	1	46	6
Montrose	2016–17	League Two	18	1	1	0	0	0	3 (Note: Two appearances in the Scottish Challenge Cup and one in the League One play-offs)	0	22	1
Montrose	2017–18	League Two	20	2	3	1	1	0	3	1	27	4
Montrose	2018–19	League One	30	0	3	0	4	0	5 (Note: Three appearances in the Scottish Challenge Cup and two in the Championship play-offs)	1 (Note: Goal in the Scottish Challenge Cup.)	42	1
Montrose	2019–20	League One	5	0	1	0	0	0	2	0	8	0
Montrose	Montrose total		73	3	8	1	5	0	13	2	98	6
Career total			336	22	26	4	19	1	27	2	416	32
