= Martyn Fotheringham =

Scottish footballer and coach

Personal information
- Date of birth: 23 April 1983 (age 43)
- Place of birth: Perth, Scotland
- Height: 5 ft 10 in (1.78 m)
- Position: Midfielder

Youth career
- –2001: St Johnstone

Senior career*
Years	Team	Apps	(Gls)
2001–2005	St Johnstone	19	(2)
2003	→ Brechin City (loan)	11	(0)
2005–2006	Montrose	28	(8)
2006–2007	Cowdenbeath	25	(1)
2007–2017	Forfar Athletic	244	(40)
2017–2019	Montrose	7	(0)
2020–2021	Forfar Athletic	1	(0)

Managerial career
- 2019: Montrose (assistant)
- 2019–2021: Forfar Athletic (assistant)
- * Club domestic league appearances and goals

Martyn Fotheringham (born 23 March 1983) is a Scottish football coach and a former midfielder. He was previously part of the management team at Forfar Athletic.

He started his career with St Johnstone and has since also played for Brechin, Montrose, Cowdenbeath and Montrose.

== Post-retirement ==
On 27 April 2019, 37-year old Fotheringham announced his retirement but continued as a part of the coaching staff at Montrose. On 13 November 2019, he was hired as a first team coach at his former club, Forfar Athletic, under manager Stuart Malcolm.

It was announced on 9 April 2021 via previous manager Stuart Malcolms Twitter that Malcolm and his two assistants Fotheringham and Barry Sellars had left the club.

== Career statistics ==
As of match played 28 October 2017

Appearances and goals by club, season and competition
Club	Season	League			Scottish Cup		League Cup		Other		Total	
Club	Season	Division	Apps	Goals	Apps	Goals	Apps	Goals	Apps	Goals	Apps	Goals
St Johnstone	2000–01	Premier League	2	0	0	0	0	0	0	0	2	0
St Johnstone	2001–02	Premier League	6	0	0	0	0	0	0	0	6	0
St Johnstone	2002–03	First Division	0	0	0	0	0	0	2 (Note: Appearances in the Scottish Challenge Cup)	0	2	0
St Johnstone	2003–04	First Division	6	1	0	0	0	0	1	0	7	1
St Johnstone	2004–05	First Division	5	1	0	0	0	0	0	0	5	1
St Johnstone	Total		19	2	0	0	0	0	3	0	22	2
Brechin City	2002–03	Second Division	11	0	0	0	0	0	0	0	11	0
Brechin City	Total		11	0	0	0	0	0	0	0	11	0
Montrose	2005–06	Third Division	28	8	1	0	1	0	1	0	31	8
Montrose	Total		28	8	1	0	1	0	1	0	31	8
Cowdenbeath	2006–07	Second Division	25	1	3	0	2	0	2	2	32	3
Cowdenbeath	Total		25	1	3	0	2	0	2	2	32	3
Forfar Athletic	2007–08	Third Division	22	2	2	0	0	0	2	0	26	2
Forfar Athletic	2008–09	Third Division	32	4	1	0	1	1	1	0	35	5
Forfar Athletic	2009–10	Third Division	27	4	1	0	2	1	5 (Note: Two appearances and a goal in the Scottish Challenge Cup; three appearances and a goal in the Second Division play-offs)	2	35	7
Forfar Athletic	2010–11	Second Division	27	7	0	0	1	0	2 (Note: Appearances in the First Division play-offs)	0	30	7
Forfar Athletic	2011–12	Second Division	26	8	1	0	2	0	1	0	30	8
Forfar Athletic	2012–13	Second Division	26	4	2	0	1	0	2	0	31	4
Forfar Athletic	2013–14	League One	20	4	3	1	1	0	1	0	25	5
Forfar Athletic	2014–15	League One	24	6	0	0	0	0	4 (Note: Appearances in the Championship play-offs)	0	28	6
Forfar Athletic	2015–16	League One	25	0	3	0	2	0	1	0	31	0
Forfar Athletic	2016–17	League Two	15	1	1	0	2	0	5 (Note: One appearance in the Scottish Challenge Cup; four appearances and two goals in the League One play-offs)	2	23	3
Forfar Athletic	Total		244	40	14	1	12	2	24	4	294	47
Montrose	2017–18	League Two	7	0	0	0	3	0	0	0	10	0
Career total			334	51	18	1	18	2	30	6	400	60
