= Noel Hunt =

Irish football manager (born 1982)

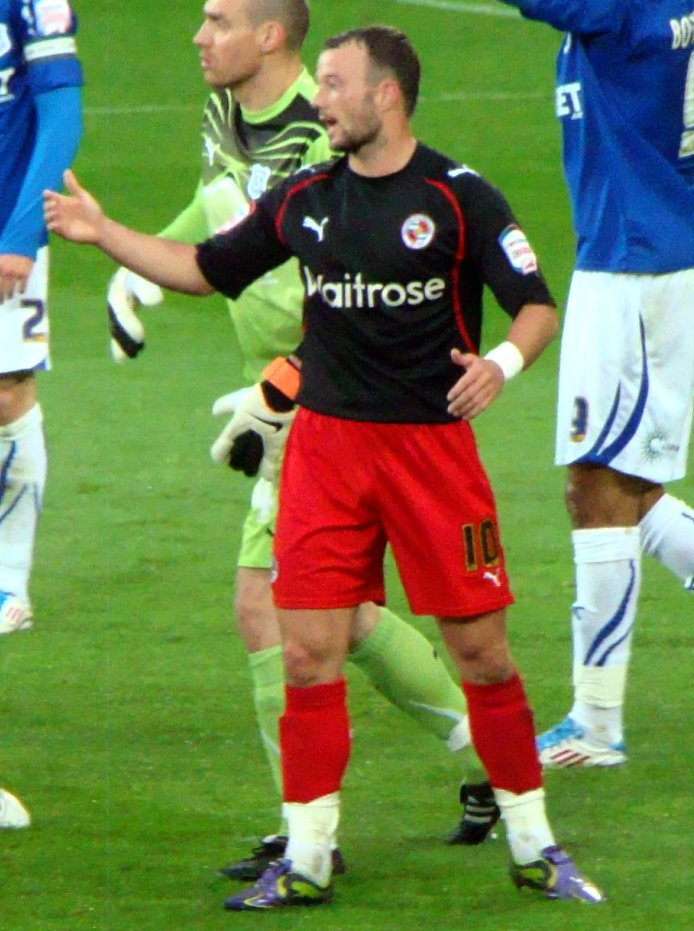
- Hunt playing for Reading in 2011

Personal information
- Full name: Noel Hunt
- Date of birth: 26 December 1982 (age 43)
- Place of birth: Waterford, Ireland
- Height: 1.73 m (5 ft 8 in)
- Position: Striker

Senior career*
| Years | Team | Apps | (Gls) |
| 2001–2003 | Shamrock Rovers | 25 | (11) |
| 2001–2002 | → Waterford United (loan) | 9 | (5) |
| 2003–2006 | Dunfermline Athletic | 80 | (8) |
| 2006–2008 | Dundee United | 64 | (23) |
| 2008–2013 | Reading | 145 | (33) |
| 2013–2015 | Leeds United | 20 | (0) |
| 2014–2015 | → Ipswich Town (loan) | 4 | (1) |
| 2015 | Ipswich Town | 7 | (2) |
| 2015–2016 | Southend United | 21 | (4) |
| 2016–2017 | Portsmouth | 20 | (1) |
| 2017–2018 | Wigan Athletic | 7 | (0) |
| 2018 | Waterford | 8 | (3) |
| Total | | 410 | (91) |

International career
| 2002–2003 | Republic of Ireland U21 | 4 | (1) |
| 2007 | Republic of Ireland B | 1 | (0) |
| 2008–2009 | Republic of Ireland | 3 | (0) |

Managerial career
- 2020: Swindon Town (caretaker)
- 2023: Reading (caretaker)
- 2024–2025: Reading
- * Club domestic league appearances and goals

Noel Hunt (born 26 December 1982) is an Irish football manager and former professional footballer who was formerly the head coach at Reading.

A striker, he began his career in Ireland with Shamrock Rovers, also playing for Waterford United on loan. He moved to Scotland in 2003, where he played for Dunfermline Athletic and Dundee United. He has played in England since 2008, with spells at Reading, Leeds United, Ipswich Town, Southend United, Portsmouth and Wigan Athletic, prior to returning to Ireland and rejoining Waterford 2018.

Hunt has also represented the Republic of Ireland national team. Having previously played at under-21 and B international level, he won three full caps between 2008 and 2009. His brother, Stephen, is also an Irish international footballer.

== Club career ==
=== Ireland ===
Hunt began playing junior club football in his home city of Waterford at Johnville FC, before being signed by Damien Richardson for League of Ireland club, Shamrock Rovers in Dublin in 2001, aged 18. He made his competitive debut in a 3–2 League of Ireland Cup win over Shelbourne on 29 October 2001, and scored his first competitive goal in the same competition in January.

Rovers then loaned him out to Waterford United where he scored five league goals in the First Division in the 2001–02 season. Scoring on his debut in December 2001 he was later embroiled in controversy as the Blues were deducted three points due to incorrect registration.

The following season was the last winter football season and in the shortened 27-game series, new manager Liam Buckley played Hunt and he rewarded the club by being top club goalscorer with eleven league goals and two FAI Cup goals to propel Rovers to the FAI Cup final and third place in the league.

During this time he also made his European debut playing twice for the club in the UEFA Cup. His final match for Shamrock Rovers was on the last day of the season, 26 January 2003, when he was substituted to a hero's reception in a game where Rovers beat Longford Town 3–2 to secure a place in the UEFA Intertoto Cup. He was awarded the Shamrock Rovers Player of the Year award that season. Hunt scored a total of 14 goals for the "Hoops".

=== Dunfermline Athletic ===
Hunt moved to Scottish Premier League club Dunfermline Athletic in a £100,000 deal on 27 January 2003, going on to win the clubs' Young Player of the Season award for the 2003–04 season. His pace and aggressive running won praise from Dunfermline supporters, but his time at the club was disrupted somewhat by a recurring knee injury.

=== Dundee United ===
He joined Dundee United in June 2006 for £50,000, scoring his first goal on 5 August against Rangers in his second match for the club, a 2–2 draw. On 14 October he scored against Celtic in a 4–1 defeat and scored the winner against Kilmarnock in November. His goals continued with winners against St Mirren, Inverness Caledonian Thistle, and Motherwell. However, after injuring himself scoring the winner against Motherwell in December, he failed to score again until his goal in the 4–0 away victory over Hearts in March 2007.

In the 2007–08 season, Hunt scored three times in the opening six league matches, as well as a goal in the League Cup Final, a match United lost to Rangers on penalties amidst refereeing controversy, during a 2–2 draw. On 31 October 2007 in a League Cup match against Hamilton Academical, he scored his first hat-trick for United in a 3–1 win.

=== Reading ===
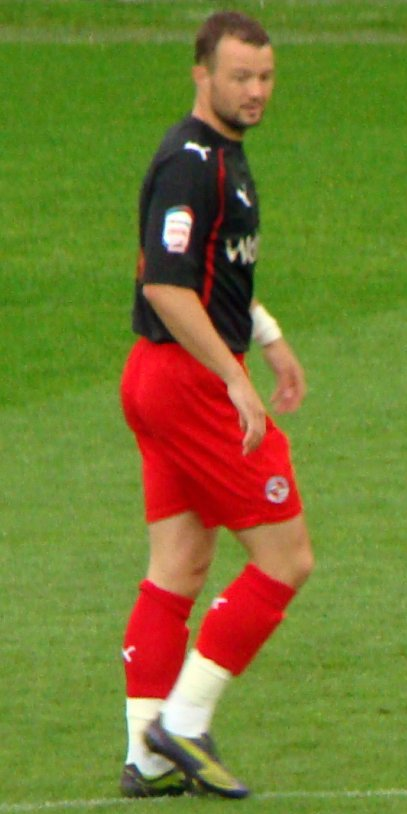
Hunt playing for Reading in 2011

On 23 July 2008, Hunt moved to Championship side Reading for an undisclosed fee rumoured to be around £600,000. Having taken the club's number 11 shirt, recently vacated by John Oster, Hunt joined up with the squad's tour of Sweden and scored his first goal in a 3–1 win over Halmstads BK on 29 July.

In the absence of Reading manager Steve Coppell (who was already in Sweden), Director of Football Nicky Hammond said that although "Dundee United didn't want to lose Noel but understood his real desire to embark upon a new challenge with Reading Football Club. From my conversations with Noel, it is clear that he possesses the qualities of hunger and determination that Steve Coppell wants at this club as we attempt to regain a place in the Premier League."

He played his first competitive game for Reading on 12 August 2008, scoring the deciding goal in a 2–1 win over Dagenham & Redbridge in the first round of the Football League Cup. He also scored on his second appearance on 26 August 2008, scoring the first of five goals by Reading in a 5–1 result against Luton Town. Hunt scored his first league goals for Reading when he scored twice in a 6–0 win over Sheffield Wednesday. In February 2011, Hunt revealed he turned down SPL side Celtic to stay at Reading and signed a new 2-year deal with the club.

In February 2012, Hunt was nominated for the PFA Player in the Community award. Hunt scored 8 goals in 41 Championship games during the 2011/12 season which helped Reading earn The Championship title and seal a return to the Premier League under the stewardship of manager Brian McDermott.

Hunt scored his first Premier League goal for Reading in the 2–2 draw with Newcastle United, heading them 2–1 up from a Jobi McAnuff cross. He scored his second Premier League goal for Reading in a 2–2 draw with Swansea a week later, volleying in from inside the box. In his final season at Reading. Hunt revealed in January 2013 he was hoping to earn a new extended contract at Reading, with his contract expiring at the end of the 2012/13 season. Hunt made 24 appearances in the Premier League and a further 6 in cup competitions, scoring 6 goals in all competitions, Hunt's first team opportunities were limited after competing with Adam Le Fondre, Pavel Pogrebnyak, and Jason Roberts for first team places.

After Reading's relegation from the Premier League, Hunt was released by Reading at the end of his contract in May 2013.

=== Leeds United ===
On 3 July 2013, Hunt signed a two-year contract with Championship side Leeds United linking up with his former Reading boss, Brian McDermott. Hunt was handed the Number 10 shirt that had been left vacant after the departure of Luciano Becchio. Hunt revealed the club's reputation and fans- as well as joining up his former boss- were big reasons for joining the club.

Hunt made his Leeds United début in the first game of the season against Brighton & Hove Albion on 3 August, Hunt started the match in which Leeds earned a 2–1 victory. Hunt picked up a hamstring injury in the fixture against Derby County on 5 October and was substituted and subsequently missed all of the following fixtures in 2013 through injury. He returned to training during late December with the hope of returning to the first team in 2014. He made his return to first team action on 4 January 2014, as a second-half substitute in the shock 2–0 FA Cup defeat against Rochdale.

After 19 appearances for Leeds during his début season, Hunt finished the season with 0 goals, during an injury hit season.

On 7 January 2015, Hunt agreed to terminate his contract with Leeds, not having appeared for the club since August 2014, and having failed to score in 22 first-team appearances.

==== Ipswich Town (loan) ====
After falling down the pecking order at Leeds, Hunt joined Ipswich Town on loan on 27 November 2014. On 29 November, Hunt came on as a substitute to make his debut for Ipswich Town against Charlton Athletic in which he scored a 94th-minute winner in a 1–0 win on his debut. The goal marked his first goal since January 2013.

=== Ipswich Town ===
Hunt rejoined Ipswich Town on a permanent deal on 8 January 2015 after being released by Leeds United. On his permanent debut on 17 January 2015, Hunt scored two goals in a 3–1 win away to Millwall. Hunt was later released by the club, at the end of the season.

=== Southend United ===
Following Hunt's release from Ipswich Town, Southend United had a lengthy tussle with Chicago Fire over the forward, eventually gaining his signature on 1 August 2015. Hunt signed a one-year contract which could be extended to two depending on performances. His first goal for the club came against Coventry City on 31 August 2015. At the end of the 2015–16 season it was announced that Hunt would be leaving the League One club, though Southend boss Phil Brown confirmed he was hopeful that a new deal with Hunt could be negotiated.

=== Portsmouth ===
On 4 August 2016, Hunt signed a one-year deal with Portsmouth. Hunt scored his first goal for the club in a 4–0 win over Mansfield Town on 12 November 2016.

=== Wigan Athletic ===
On 3 August 2017, Hunt signed for League One club Wigan Athletic on a one-year contract. Wigan entered into contract talks with him at the end of the 2017–18 season.

=== Waterford ===
On 31 May 2018, Hunt returned to his hometown club of Waterford in a player-assistant manager role.

== International career ==
Hunt made his debut as a substitute for his country at Rugby Park in a Republic of Ireland under-21 national football team friendly game against Scotland in February 2003. He went on to play four times at this level scoring once in Tbilisi. He was named in the Republic of Ireland "B" squad on 8 November 2007, for the match against Scotland on 20 November at the Excelsior Stadium in Airdrie, which ended in a 1–1 draw.

He was called up to the senior squad for the Poland friendly in November 2008, after injuries to Robbie Keane and Aiden McGeady, making his debut in the game, coming on as a substitute in the 60th minute.

His second cap for the Republic of Ireland came in the World Cup Qualifying tie against Italy in Bari, Southern Italy. He came on as a substitute for his then Reading colleague, Kevin Doyle.

Hunt started his first competitive game in Ireland's last World Cup qualifying tie in October 2009.

== Coaching career ==
On 13 November 2018, Hunt was appointed assistant manager at Swindon Town working alongside the newly appointed manager, Richie Wellens. Swindon Town owner, Lee Power, confirmed during an interview with BBC Radio Wiltshire that Hunt had also been registered as a player.

On 4 November 2020, he was appointed caretaker manager of Swindon Town due to Richie Wellens leaving for Salford City. On 2 December 2020, Hunt left Swindon Town by mutual consent. In May 2021, Hunt became assistant manager to Richie Wellens at Doncaster Rovers, following Wellens in leaving the club in December 2021.

=== Reading ===
On 20 February 2022, Reading announced that Hunt had been appointed as Senior Professional Development Coach. On 11 April 2023, Hunt was announced as Reading's Interim First Team Manager until the end of the season following the sacking of Paul Ince.

On 7 December 2024, following the departure of Rubén Sellés to Hull City, Hunt was appointed first-team manager on a two-and-a-half year contract. He was nominated for the League One Manager of the Month award for March 2025 after leading Reading to 3 wins and 3 draws from 6 games.

On 26 October 2025, following a 1–1 draw with Doncaster, and Reading sat 19th in League One, Noel Hunt was sacked.

== Personal life ==
In 2012 Hunt became a joint owner with former Clare hurler Davy Fitzgerald of a pub called The Dugout in Ennis, County Clare.

Hunt married his fiancée Alana Bracey in June 2013.

== Career statistics ==
=== Club ===
Appearances and goals by club, season and competition
| Club | Season | League | | | National cup | | League cup | | Other | | Total | |
| Club | Season | Division | Apps | Goals | Apps | Goals | Apps | Goals | Apps | Goals | Apps | Goals |
|---|---|---|---|---|---|---|---|---|---|---|---|---|
| Shamrock Rovers | 2001–02 | League of Ireland Premier Division | 0 | 0 | 0 | 0 | 2 | 1 | 0 | 0 | 2 | 1 |
| Shamrock Rovers | 2002–03 | League of Ireland Premier Division | 25 | 11 | 5 | 2 | 0 | 0 | 2 (Note: Appearance(s) in UEFA Cup) | 0 | 32 | 13 |
| Shamrock Rovers | Total | | 25 | 11 | 5 | 2 | 2 | 1 | 2 | 0 | 34 | 14 |
| Waterford United (loan) | 2001–02 | League of Ireland First Division | 9 | 5 | 0 | 0 | 0 | 0 | 0 | 0 | 9 | 5 |
| Dunfermline Athletic | 2002–03 | Scottish Premier League | 12 | 1 | 4 | 0 | 0 | 0 | — | | 16 | 1 |
| Dunfermline Athletic | 2003–04 | Scottish Premier League | 13 | 2 | 2 | 0 | 0 | 0 | — | | 15 | 2 |
| Dunfermline Athletic | 2004–05 | Scottish Premier League | 23 | 1 | 3 | 1 | 1 | 1 | 1 | 0 | 28 | 3 |
| Dunfermline Athletic | 2005–06 | Scottish Premier League | 32 | 4 | 1 | 1 | 4 | 0 | — | | 37 | 5 |
| Dunfermline Athletic | Total | | 80 | 8 | 10 | 2 | 5 | 1 | 1 | 0 | 96 | 11 |
| Dundee United | 2006–07 | Scottish Premier League | 28 | 10 | 1 | 0 | 2 | 0 | — | | 31 | 10 |
| Dundee United | 2007–08 | Scottish Premier League | 36 | 13 | 3 | 0 | 5 | 5 | — | | 44 | 18 |
| Dundee United | Total | | 64 | 23 | 4 | 0 | 7 | 5 | — | | 75 | 28 |
| Reading | 2008–09 | Championship | 37 | 11 | 0 | 0 | 2 | 2 | 0 | 0 | 39 | 13 |
| Reading | 2009–10 | Championship | 10 | 2 | 0 | 0 | 2 | 0 | — | | 12 | 2 |
| Reading | 2010–11 | Championship | 33 | 10 | 3 | 0 | 1 | 0 | 3 (Note: Appearance(s) in Championship play-offs) | 0 | 40 | 10 |
| Reading | 2011–12 | Championship | 41 | 8 | 0 | 0 | 0 | 0 | — | | 41 | 8 |
| Reading | 2012–13 | Premier League | 24 | 2 | 3 | 3 | 3 | 1 | — | | 30 | 6 |
| Reading | Total | | 145 | 33 | 6 | 3 | 8 | 3 | 3 | 0 | 162 | 39 |
| Leeds United | 2013–14 | Championship | 19 | 0 | 1 | 0 | 0 | 0 | — | | 20 | 0 |
| Leeds United | 2014–15 | Championship | 1 | 0 | 0 | 0 | 1 | 0 | — | | 2 | 0 |
| Leeds United | Total | | 20 | 0 | 1 | 0 | 1 | 0 | 0 | 0 | 22 | 0 |
| Ipswich Town (loan) | 2014–15 | Championship | 4 | 1 | 0 | 0 | 0 | 0 | 0 | 0 | 4 | 1 |
| Ipswich Town | 2014–15 | Championship | 7 | 2 | 0 | 0 | 0 | 0 | 1 | 0 | 8 | 2 |
| Southend United | 2015–16 | League One | 21 | 4 | 0 | 0 | 1 | 0 | 0 | 0 | 22 | 4 |
| Portsmouth | 2016–17 | League Two | 20 | 1 | 1 | 0 | 1 | 0 | 2 (Note: Appearances in EFL Trophy) | 0 | 24 | 1 |
| Wigan Athletic | 2017–18 | League One | 7 | 0 | 3 | 0 | 1 | 0 | 2 | 1 | 13 | 1 |
| Waterford | 2018 | League of Ireland Premier Division | 8 | 3 | 2 | 3 | 0 | 0 | 0 | 0 | 10 | 6 |
| Career total | | | 410 | 91 | 32 | 10 | 26 | 10 | 11 | 1 | 479 | 112 |

=== International ===
Appearances and goals by national team and year
| National team | Year | Apps | Goals |
|---|---|---|---|
| Republic of Ireland | 2008 | 1 | 0 |
| Republic of Ireland | 2009 | 2 | 0 |
| Total | | 3 | 0 |

== Managerial statistics ==
As of match played 25 October 2025

Managerial record by team and tenure
| Team | From | To | Record | | | | | Ref. |
| Team | From | To | P | W | D | L | Win % | Ref. |
|---|---|---|---|---|---|---|---|---|
| Swindon Town (caretaker) | 4 November 2020 | 12 November 2020 | 2 | 1 | 0 | 1 | 50.0 | |
| Reading (interim) | 11 April 2023 | 8 May 2023 | 5 | 0 | 3 | 2 | 0.0 | |
| Reading | 6 December 2024 | 26 October 2025 | 51 | 19 | 16 | 16 | 37.3 | |
| Total | | | 58 | 20 | 19 | 19 | 34.5 | |

== Honours ==
Shamrock Rovers

- FAI Cup runner-up: 2002

Reading

- Football League Championship: 2011–12

Portsmouth

- EFL League Two: 2016–17

Wigan Athletic

- EFL League One: 2017–18

Individual

- Shamrock Rovers Player of the Year: 2002–03
- Dunfermline Athletic Young Player of the Season: 2003–04
