= 2004–05 Dunfermline Athletic F.C. season =

Dunfermline Athletic
2004–05 season
- Manager: David Hay (until 2 May); Jim Leishman (from 3 May)
- Stadium: East End Park
- Scottish Premier League: Eleventh place
- Scottish Cup: Fourth round
- Scottish League Cup: Quarter-finals
- UEFA Cup: Second qualifying round

The 2004–05 season saw Dunfermline Athletic compete in the Scottish Premier League where they finished in 11th position with 34 points.

== Results ==
Dunfermline Athletic's score comes first

=== Legend ===
Win	Draw	Loss

=== Scottish Premier League ===
Match	Date	Opponent	Venue	Result	Attendance	Scorers
1	7 August 2004	Dundee United	H	1–1	6,512	Tod 48'
2	15 August 2004	Inverness Caledonian Thistle	A	0–2	1,972	
3	21 August 2004	Aberdeen	H	0–1	8,533	
4	29 August 2004	Kilmarnock	A	0–1	4,854	
5	11 September 2004	Motherwell	H	1–1	4,338	Brewster 9'
6	19 September 2004	Heart of Midlothian	H	1–0	5,883	Nicholson 65'
7	25 September 2004	Celtic	A	0–3	58,213	
8	2 October 2004	Hibernian	H	1–1	7,290	Donnelly 86'
9	16 October 2004	Livingston	A	0–2	2,815	
10	23 October 2004	Dundee	A	2–1	5,456	Thomson 35', Young 48'
11	27 October 2004	Rangers	H	1–2	8,678	Brewster 22'
12	30 October 2004	Dundee United	A	2–1	6,297	Tod 8', Young 90'
13	6 November 2004	Inverness Caledonian Thistle	H	1–1	4,927	Young 28'
14	13 November 2004	Aberdeen	A	1–2	10,398	Donnelly 70'
15	20 November 2004	Kilmarnock	H	4–1	4,344	Nicholson 30', Mehmet 38', Wilson 57', Brewster 90'
16	27 November 2004	Motherwell	A	1–2	5,084	Tod 65'
17	4 December 2004	Heart of Midlothian	A	0–3	10,084	
18	12 December 2004	Celtic	H	0–2	7,650	
19	18 December 2004	Hibernian	A	1–2	9,859	Tod 68'
20	27 December 2004	Livingston	H	0–0	5,092	
21	1 January 2005	Dundee	H	3–1	4,426	Tod (3) 13', 28', 54'
22	15 January 2005	Rangers	A	0–3	48,055	
23	22 January 2005	Dundee United	H	1–1	6,589	Christiansen 44'
24	29 January 2005	Inverness Caledonian Thistle	A	0–2	5,449	
25	12 February 2005	Aberdeen	H	2–1	5,579	Mehmet 53', Donnelly 83'
26	19 February 2005	Kilmarnock	A	1–2	4,701	Christiansen 20'
27	2 March 2005	Motherwell	H	0–0	3,565	
28	5 March 2005	Heart of Midlothian	H	1–1	5,934	Wilson 32'
29	12 March 2005	Celtic	A	0–6	58,908	
30	19 March 2005	Hibernian	H	1–4	7,204	Nicholson 43'
31	2 April 2005	Livingston	A	1–1	4,573	Hunt 79'
32	9 April 2005	Dundee	A	1–2	5,995	Young 9'
33	17 April 2005	Rangers	H	0–1	8,226	
34	23 April 2005	Inverness Caledonian Thistle	H	0–0	4,481	
35	30 April 2005	Livingston	A	0–2	5,700	
36	7 May 2005	Dundee	H	5–0	8,313	Young (3) 2', 29', 64', MacDonald (o.g.) 33', Skerla 39'
37	15 May 2005	Dundee United	A	1–0	10,763	Mason 89'
38	21 May 2005	Kilmarnock	A	0–4	5,100	

=== Scottish League Cup ===
Match	Date	Opponent	Venue	Result	Attendance	Scorers
Third round	22 September 2004	Partick Thistle	H	3–1	2,301	Brewster 30', Thomson 51', Hunt 76'
Quarter-finals	10 November 2004	Heart of Midlothian	H	1–3	4,405	Mehmet 60'

=== Scottish Cup ===
Match	Date	Opponent	Venue	Result	Attendance	Scorers
Third round	8 January 2005	East Fife	A	0–0	1,772	
Third round replay	18 January 2005	East Fife	H	3–1	3,543	Tod 1', Hunt 57', Dempsey 69'
Fourth round	6 February 2005	Celtic	H	0–3	8,014	

=== UEFA Cup ===
Match	Date	Opponent	Venue	Result	Attendance	Scorers
Second qualifying round	12 August 2004	(Iceland) FH	A	2–2	1,500	Brewster 72', Skerla 87'
Second qualifying round	26 August 2004	(Iceland) FH	H	1–2	8,000	Dempsey 72'

== League table ==
Pos	Team	Pld	W	D	L	GF	GA	GD	Pts	Qualification or relegation (Note: Teams played each other three times (33 matches), before the league split into two groups (the top six and the bottom six) for the last five matches.)
8	Inverness Caledonian Thistle	38	11	11	16	41	47	−6	44	
9	Dundee United	38	8	12	18	41	59	−18	36	Qualification for the UEFA Cup second qualifying round (Note: As Celtic, the 2004–05 Scottish Cup winners, qualified for the UEFA Champions League via their league position, the place in the UEFA Cup was passed onto Dundee United, the cup runners-up.)
10	Livingston	38	9	8	21	34	61	−27	35	
11	Dunfermline Athletic	38	8	10	20	34	60	−26	34	
12	Dundee (R)	38	8	9	21	37	71	−34	33	Relegation to the Scottish First Division

Source: Scottish Professional Football League
Rules for classification: 1) Points; 2) Goal difference; 3) Goals scored
(R) Relegated
