= 2005–06 Dunfermline Athletic F.C. season =

Dunfermline Athletic
2005–06 season
- Manager: Jim Leishman
- Stadium: East End Park
- SPL: Eleventh place
- Scottish Cup: Third round
- Scottish League Cup: Runners-up
- Top goalscorer: League: Mark Burchill (12); All: Mark Burchill (15)

The 2005–06 season saw Dunfermline Athletic compete in the Scottish Premier League where they finished in 11th position with 33 points. They also reached the 2006 Scottish League Cup Final where they lost 3–0 to Celtic.

== Results ==
Dunfermline Athletic's score comes first

=== Legend ===
Win	Draw	Loss

=== Scottish Premier League ===
Match	Date	Opponent	Venue	Result	Attendance	Scorers
1	30 July 2005	Hibernian	A	1–1	13,010	Shields 12'
2	6 August 2005	Motherwell	A	0–1	4,649	
3	13 August 2005	Inverness Caledonian Thistle	H	0–1	5,005	
4	20 August 2005	Livingston	A	1–1	4,522	Makel 44'
5	28 August 2005	Celtic	H	0–4	9,244	
6	10 September 2005	Kilmarnock	A	2–3	4,737	Burchill 4', Young 67'
7	17 September 2005	Aberdeen	H	0–2	6,387	
8	24 September 2005	Dundee United	H	2–1	8,361	Tod 60', Ross 75'
9	1 October 2005	Rangers	A	1–5	48,374	Hunt 54'
10	15 October 2005	Falkirk	H	0–1	7,068	
11	22 October 2005	Heart of Midlothian	A	0–2	16,500	
12	26 October 2005	Hibernian	H	1–2	6,853	Mason 87'
13	29 October 2005	Motherwell	H	0–3	4,421	
14	5 November 2005	Inverness Caledonian Thistle	A	1–2	3,728	Makel 73'
15	19 November 2005	Livingston	H	0–1	6,016	
16	26 November 2005	Celtic	A	1–0	58,203	Ross 17'
17	3 December 2005	Kilmarnock	H	0–1	4,319	
18	10 December 2005	Aberdeen	A	0–0	9,881	
19	20 December 2005	Dundee United	A	1–2	5,889	Wilson 31'
20	26 December 2005	Rangers	H	3–3	9,481	Tod 16', Burchill 23', Young 90'
21	31 December 2005	Falkirk	A	2–1	6,235	Burchill 45', Hunt 58'
22	14 January 2006	Heart of Midlothian	H	1–4	8,277	Burchill 58'
23	21 January 2006	Hibernian	A	1–3	13,316	Donnelly 35'
24	28 January 2006	Motherwell	H	1–1	4,961	Young 11'
25	8 February 2006	Inverness Caledonian Thistle	H	2–2	3,354	Hunt 9', Burchill 11'
26	11 February 2006	Livingston	A	1–0	4,371	Burchill 12'
27	19 February 2006	Celtic	H	1–8	9,015	Tod 14'
28	25 February 2006	Dundee United	H	1–1	4,694	Burchill 14'
29	4 March 2006	Kilmarnock	A	0–1	5,507	
30	11 March 2006	Aberdeen	H	1–0	5,308	Burchill 48'
31	25 March 2006	Rangers	A	0–1	49,017	
32	1 April 2006	Falkirk	H	1–1	6,836	Burchill 50'
33	8 April 2006	Heart of Midlothian	A	0–4	16,973	
34	15 April 2006	Falkirk	A	0–0	5,413	
35	22 April 2006	Livingston	H	3–2	5,795	Burchill (2) 38', 78', Hunt 85'
36	29 April 2006	Motherwell	A	3–2	3,621	Campbell 21', Burchill 30', Mason 50'
37	2 May 2006	Dundee United	A	1–0	5,034	Daquin 78'
38	6 May 2006	Inverness Caledonian Thistle	H	0–1	5,354	

=== Scottish League Cup ===
Match	Date	Opponent	Venue	Result	Attendance	Scorers
Second round	23 August 2005	Gretna	A	1–0	1,405	Burchill 17'
Third round	20 September 2005	Kilmarnock	A	4–3	3,191	McCunnie 7', Young (3) 8', 16', 64'
Quarter-finals	8 November 2005	Hibernian	H	3–0	6,005	Burchill (2) 15', 45', Mason 90'
Semi-finals	25 January 2006	Livingston	N	1–0	4,630	Young 37'
Final	19 March 2006	Celtic	N	0–3	50,090	

=== Scottish Cup ===
Match	Date	Opponent	Venue	Result	Attendance	Scorers
Third round	7 January 2006	Airdrie United	H	3–4	3,805	Mason 16', Hunt 23', Young 56'

== League table ==
Pos	Team	Pld	W	D	L	GF	GA	GD	Pts	Qualification or relegation (Note: Teams played each other three times (33 matches), before the league split into two groups (the top six and the bottom six) for the last five matches.)
8	Motherwell	38	13	10	15	55	61	−6	49	
9	Dundee United	38	7	12	19	41	66	−25	33	
10	Falkirk	38	8	9	21	35	64	−29	33	
11	Dunfermline Athletic	38	8	9	21	33	68	−35	33	
12	Livingston (R)	38	4	6	28	25	79	−54	18	Relegation to the Scottish First Division

Source: Scottish Professional Football League
Rules for classification: 1) Points; 2) Goal difference; 3) Goals scored
(R) Relegated
