= Dale Hilson =

Scottish footballer

Personal information
- Full name: Dale Gordon Hilson
- Date of birth: 23 December 1992 (age 33)
- Place of birth: Stirling, Scotland
- Height: 5 ft 7 in (1.70 m)
- Position: Striker

Team information
- Current team: Stirling Albion
- Number: 25

Youth career
- Carse Thistle
- Dundee United

Senior career*
Years	Team	Apps	(Gls)
2009–2014	Dundee United	3	(0)
2010–2011	→ Forfar Athletic (loan)	29	(3)
2011–2012	→ Forfar Athletic (loan)	20	(2)
2012–2013	→ Forfar Athletic (loan)	21	(3)
2013–2014	→ Forfar Athletic (loan)	29	(12)
2014–2015	Forfar Athletic	34	(10)
2015–2017	Queen of the South	28	(5)
2017	St Mirren	2	(1)
2018–2020	Forfar Athletic	42	(13)
2020–2023	Arbroath	85	(8)
2023–	Stirling Albion	73	(6)
- * Club domestic league appearances and goals as of 5 May 2026

Dale Hilson (born 23 December 1992, in Stirling) is a Scottish footballer who plays as a striker for Stirling Albion, having previously played for Dundee United, Forfar Athletic, Queen of the South, St Mirren and Arbroath.

== Career ==
Hilson, who had featured a handful of times for the Terrors Under-19s, debuted in October 2009 as a substitute in the Scottish Premier League match versus Hamilton Academical. Hilson won the Under-19 Scottish Premier League player of the season for 2009–10.

In August 2010, Hilson then joined Forfar Athletic on loan, scoring on his league debut and was again loaned out to the Sky Blues in 2012. On 28 April 2012, Hilson was sent-off for foul and abusive language. In December 2012, Hilson started a third loan spell at Station Park and then in August 2013, he returned for a fourth loan spell, joining until the end of January 2014. The loan deal was then extended until the end of the season, as he finished joint-top goalscorer with Gavin Swankie with 13 goals. During his fourth loan spell, Hilson made his 100th appearance for the Loons, making 113 appearances in total during his time at the club.

On 4 June 2014, Hilson was released by the Tannadice club at the end of his contract and then on 3 July 2014, signed for the Sky Blues on a permanent contract.

In June 2015, Hilson then signed for Scottish Championship club Queen of the South. Hilson's contract at the Doonhamers was not renewed in May 2017 having made 38 appearances and scoring seven goals in all competitions during his two seasons with the club.

On 27 June 2017, Hilson signed a six-month contract with St Mirren, after successfully spending a week on trial to prove his fitness. On 30 September 2017, Hilson scored his only goal for the club in a 2–1 win versus Brechin City and was then released when his contract expired at the end of the year. On 1 January 2018, Hilson returned to Station Park, signing an 18-month contract with the Loons for his sixth spell with the club. On 18 January 2020, Hilson signed for Arbroath.

== Career statistics ==
As of match played 18 November 2017

Appearances and goals by club, season and competition
Club	Season	League			Scottish Cup		League Cup		Other		Total	
Club	Season	Division	Apps	Goals	Apps	Goals	Apps	Goals	Apps	Goals	Apps	Goals
Dundee United	2009–10	Scottish Premier League	2	0	0	0	0	0	0	0	2	0
Dundee United	2012–13	Scottish Premier League	1	0	0	0	0	0	0	0	1	0
Dundee United	Dundee United total		3	0	0	0	0	0	0	0	3	0
Forfar Athletic (loan)	2010–11	Second Division	29	3	0	0	1	0	2 (Note: Appearances in the First Division play-offs)	1	32	4
Forfar Athletic (loan)	2011–12	Second Division	20	2	1	0	0	0	0	0	21	2
Forfar Athletic (loan)	2012–13	Second Division	20	3	1	0	0	0	2 (Note: Appearances in the First Division play-offs)	0	23	3
Forfar Athletic (loan)	2013–14	League One	29	12	3	1	1	0	0	0	33	13
Forfar Athletic	2014–15	League One	35	10	1	1	0	0	2 (Note: One appearance and a goal in the Scottish Challenge Cup and one appearance in the Championship play-offs)	1	38	12
Forfar Athletic	Forfar total		133	30	6	2	2	0	6	2	147	34
Queen of the South	2015–16	Championship	14	4	0	0	1	1	2 (Note: Appearances in the Scottish Challenge Cup)	0	17	5
Queen of the South	2016–17	Championship	14	1	0	0	6	0	1	1	21	2
Queen of the South	Queen of the South total		28	5	0	0	7	1	3	1	38	7
St Mirren	2017–18	Championship	2	1	1	0	0	0	2	0	5	1
Forfar Athletic	2017–18	League One	0	0	0	0	0	0	0	0	0	0
Career total			166	36	7	2	9	1	11	3	193	42
