= Nicky Low =

Scottish footballer (born 1992)

Personal information
- Date of birth: 6 January 1992 (age 34)
- Place of birth: Greenock, Scotland
- Position: Midfielder

Team information
- Current team: Clydebank
- Number: 23

Youth career
- Aberdeen

Senior career*
Years	Team	Apps	(Gls)
2010–2015	Aberdeen	39	(3)
2011–2012	→ Forfar Athletic (loan)	29	(6)
2012–2013	→ Alloa Athletic (loan)	10	(0)
2015–2017	Dundee	23	(1)
2017–2018	Derry City	57	(3)
2019	Queen of the South	7	(0)
2019–2021	East Stirlingshire	35	(16)
2021	→ Arbroath (loan)	6	(1)
2021–2023	Arbroath	23	(5)
2022–2023	→ Kelty Hearts (loan)	10	(1)
2023–	Clydebank	93	(15)

International career
2009	Scotland U17	4	(0)
- * Club domestic league appearances and goals as of 23:59, 18 February 2023 (UTC)

Nicky Low (born 6 January 1992) is a Scottish footballer who plays as a midfielder for Clydebank.

Low has previously played for Dundee, Aberdeen, Forfar Athletic, Alloa Athletic, Derry City, Queen of the South, Arbroath and had a loan spell at Kelty Hearts.

== Club career ==
=== Aberdeen ===
On 27 January 2010, Low debuted for the Dons versus Heart of Midlothian, appearing as a substitute. Aberdeen won the match 3–0.

On 30 August 2011, Low was sent out on loan to Forfar Athletic until 1 January 2012. After impressing on loan, Low returned to the Loons until the end of the 2011-12 season. During his time at Station Park, Low was voted Supporter's Player of the Year and Young Sky Blues Player of the Year. On 18 October 2012, Low signed for Alloa Athletic, on loan initially for one month. Low's loan spell was then extended until 1 January 2014 before returning to Pittrodrie.

On 29 December 2013, Low scored his first goal for the Dons in a 1–0 victory versus Ross County. On 16 March in the 2014 Scottish League Cup Final versus Inverness Caledonian Thistle, Low appeared as a 70th minute substitute, scoring a spot kick in the penalty shoot-out victory for Aberdeen. On 15 May 2014, Low signed a new one-year contract with the Dons.

=== Dundee ===
On 20 April 2015, Low signed a pre-contract to sign for Dundee on a three-year deal from the start of the 2015-16 season.

=== Derry City ===
In January 2017, Low was sent out on loan to Northern Irish club Derry City. In June 2017, Low's loan spell was extended until 7 November 2017, before returning to Dens Park. On 31 January 2018, Low returned to the Candystripes after winning the previous season's Player of the Year and Players' Player of the Year awards. In May 2018, Low was released by Dundee and then signed for the Candystripes on a permanent deal.

Low played in 56 matches for City, scoring three goals.

=== Queen of the South ===
On 27 December 2018, Low agreed to sign for Dumfries club Queen of the South when the transfer window opened on 1 January 2019, with his contract scheduled to run until the end of the 2018-19 season.

=== East Stirlingshire ===
On 14 May 2019, Low signed a pre-contract to join East Stirlingshire in the Lowland League for the 2019-20 season. Low enjoyed a successful first season at the club, scoring 14 goals and registering 13 assists from central midfield in the Lowland League, as well as scoring once in the Scottish Cup, with a 30-yard free kick in a 3–2 loss to Broxburn Athletic. In the Coronavirus shortened season of 2019–20, Low picked up both the Players' Player and Fans Player of the Year awards.

Low was announced as the new club captain on 11 September 2020. With the Lowland League under suspension, Low was loaned to Arbroath in March 2021.

=== Arbroath ===
Following the expiry of his contract with East Stirlingshire, Low signed a two-year contract with Scottish Championship side Arbroath in May 2021. Low would enjoy a successful 2021–22 season which saw the part-time Lichties compete for the Championship title in what became worldwide news.

==== Loan to Kelty Hearts ====
On 9 September 2022, Low joined Scottish League One side Kelty Hearts on loan until January. Despite extending his loan until the end of the season, Low would leave Kelty and Arbroath in February 2023.

=== Clydebank ===
In February 2023, Low joined West of Scotland Football League Premier Division club Clydebank until the end of the season. He scored his first goal for the club in a 2–0 semi final win vs St Roch's.

On 21 February 2024 the club announced that Low had signed on for another two seasons, which will take him up until the summer of 2026 https://www.clydebankfc.com/nicky-low-signs-until-2026/

== Career statistics ==
As of 4 August 2020

Appearances and goals by club, season and competition
Club	Season	League			National Cup		League Cup		Other		Total	
Club	Season	Division	Apps	Goals	Apps	Goals	Apps	Goals	Apps	Goals	Apps	Goals
Aberdeen	2009–10	Scottish Premier League	1	0	0	0	0	0	0	0	1	0
Aberdeen	2010–11	Scottish Premier League	1	0	0	0	0	0	—		1	0
Aberdeen	2011–12	Scottish Premier League	2	0	0	0	0	0	—		2	0
Aberdeen	2012–13	Scottish Premier League	5	0	0	0	0	0	—		5	0
Aberdeen	2013–14	Premiership	12	1	1	0	4	0	—		17	1
Aberdeen	2014–15	Premiership	7	1	0	0	1	0	5 (Note: Appearances in the Europa League)	0	13	1
Aberdeen	Total		28	2	1	0	5	0	5	0	39	2
Forfar Athletic (loan)	2011–12	Scottish Second Division	29	6	2	0	0	0	0	0	31	6
Alloa Athletic (loan)	2012–13	Scottish Second Division	10	0	1	0	0	0	0	0	11	0
Dundee	2015–16	Scottish Premiership	21	0	2	0	0	0	—		23	0
Dundee	2016–17	Scottish Premiership	2	1	0	0	0	0	—		2	1
Dundee	Total		23	1	2	0	0	0	0	0	25	1
Derry City	2017-18	League of Ireland Premier Division	50	3	1	0	3	0	2	0	56	3
Queen of the South	2018-19	Scottish Championship	7	0	3	0	0	0	0	0	10	0
East Stirlingshire	2019-20	Lowland League	25	14	1	1	0	0	0	0	26	15
East Stirlingshire	2020-21	Lowland League	5	2	0	0	0	0	0	0	5	2
Career total			147	12	10	0	8	0	7	0	172	12

== Honours ==
Aberdeen

- Scottish League Cup: 2013–14

Derry City

- League of Ireland Cup: 2018

Clydebank

- West of Scotland Football League Cup runner-up: 2022–23
- West of Scotland Football League Premier Division: 2024-25
