= Jesper Christiansen (footballer, born 1980) =

Danish footballer (born 1980)

Personal information
- Full name: Jesper Christiansen
- Date of birth: 18 June 1980 (age 46)
- Place of birth: Odense, Denmark
- Height: 1.91 m (6 ft 3 in)
- Position: Striker

Team information
- Current team: Brøndby IF (U19 manager)

Youth career
- OB

Senior career*
Years	Team	Apps	(Gls)
2002–2003	OB	26	(3)
2004	Kidderminster Harriers	38	(1)
2005	Dunfermline Athletic	13	(2)
2005	Kolding	14	(10)
2005–2008	Randers	25	(4)
2007–2008	→ Kolding (loan)	?	(6)
2008–2010	Kolding	28	(11)
2010–2015	Fredericia		
2015–2016	Svendborg		

Managerial career
- 2015–2022: SfB-Oure FA U-17
- 2022–2023: SfB-Oure FA U-19
- 2023–2024: Brøndby U-19 (assistant)
- 2024–: Brøndby U-19
- * Club domestic league appearances and goals

Jesper Christiansen (born 18 June 1980) is a Danish retired professional footballer. He previously played for Danish clubs and in England and Scotland.

His father Mogens Christiansen played for Odense Boldklub in the 1970s and 1980s.

== Honours ==
Randers

- Danish Cup: 2005–06
