= Nathan Taggart =

Scottish footballer

Personal information
- Date of birth: 28 August 1987 (age 39)
- Place of birth: Glasgow, Scotland
- Position: Midfielder

Team information
- Current team: Alloa Athletic

Youth career
- Stirling Albion

Senior career*
Years	Team	Apps	(Gls)
2005–2011	Stirling Albion	106	(6)
2011–	Alloa Athletic	0	(0)
- * Club domestic league appearances and goals as of 2 February 2011

Nathan Taggart (born 28 August 1987) is a Scottish professional footballer who plays for team Alloa Athletic.

== Career ==
Taggart signed for Stirling Albion in April 2005 from the Stirling Albion Youth System. Taggart made his professional debut for Stirling Albion on 30 April 2005 against Brechin City. On 14 January 2011 the club announced that he had left the club having decided to take a break from football. However Taggart went on to sign for local rivals Alloa the following month.
