= Michael Bolochoweckyj =

Scottish footballer (born 1984)

Personal information
- Date of birth: 4 May 1984 (age 42)
- Place of birth: Edinburgh, Scotland
- Position: Centre back

Team information
- Current team: Spartans

Senior career*
Years	Team	Apps	(Gls)
2003–2004	Ross County	1	(0)
2004–2007	Alloa Athletic	59	(4)
2007–2008	Berwick Rangers	15	(0)
2008	→ East Stirlingshire (loan)	9	(3)
2008–2010	East Stirlingshire	63	(7)
2010–2013	Forfar Athletic	66	(5)
2013–2015	East Stirlingshire	45	(5)
2015–2016	Clyde	25	(2)
2016–2019	Montrose	26	(3)
2017	→East Stirlingshire (loan)		
2019–	Spartans		
- * Club domestic league appearances and goals as of 18:15, 1 July 2019 (UTC)

Michael Bolochoweckyj (born 4 May 1984) is a Scottish footballer who plays as a defender for Spartans.

Starting his career with Ross County, Bolochoweckyj also played for Alloa Athletic, Berwick Rangers, East Stirlingshire, Forfar Athletic, Clyde and Montrose.

== Career ==
Though he spent the first eleven months of his career at Ross County, Bolochoweckyj moved to Alloa Athletic in January 2004 after playing just one game for the Staggies. Bolochoweckyj's début for Alloa saw him play 90 minutes against Stenhousemuir, one of four matches he played during January 2004, drafted in to save an injured defence from crumbling. He became a first-team player during the 2005–06 season, in which Alloa finished second bottom and avoided relegation by defeating Berwick Rangers in the Second Division play-off final.

Earlier in the same season, Bolochoweckyj played in four rounds of the 2005–06 Scottish Cup, scoring a goal in the third round clash against Livingston. Alloa were to exit in the next round at the hands of Hamilton Academical, at which point their season would go downhill as they were saved from relegation only at the last minute thanks to a two-legged relegation play-off victory against Berwick Rangers.

Throughout the 2006–07 season, Bolochoweckyj performed consistently in defence, attacking as and when necessary to score three goals, including one on the last day of the season against Forfar Athletic. During a 4–3 away defeat to Ayr United, Bolochoweckyj picked up the first red card of his career.

Bolochoweckyj moved to newly promoted Berwick Rangers at the end of the 2006–07 season. He began his Berwick career with scoring in the Scottish League Cup against Stenhousemuir to help his side to an extra time win. However, his spell at the Borders side was relatively short, and he signed for East Stirlingshire in March 2008. Bolochoweckyj scored his first goal for the Falkirk side just eleven days after signing in a 1–1 home draw with Dumbarton, which ended a run of eleven consecutive defeats for Shire.

He moved to Forfar Athletic for the 2010–11 season. It was announced that he had rejoined East Stirlingshire for the 2013–14 season. At the end of the 2014–15 season, Bolochoweckyj left East Stirlingshire and agreed a one-year deal with Scottish League Two rivals Clyde. He scored on his debut against Livingston in the Scottish Challenge Cup. After one season with Clyde, Bolochoweckyj left Broadwood, signing for Montrose in May 2016. After suffering an ankle injury at the end of the 2016–17 season, Bolochoweckyj moved on loan briefly to former side East Stirlingshire to gain match fitness, before returning to Montrose at the beginning of January 2018. Where upon his return he opened the scoring in a 2 – 0 win over Edinburgh City.

== Career statistics ==
As of match played 28 October 2017

Appearances and goals by club, season and competition
Club	Season	League			Scottish Cup		League Cup		Other		Total	
Club	Season	Division	Apps	Goals	Apps	Goals	Apps	Goals	Apps	Goals	Apps	Goals
Ross County	2002–03	First Division	1	0	0	0	0	0	0	0	1	0
Ross County	2003–04	First Division	0	0	0	0	0	0	0	0	0	0
Ross County	Total		1	0	0	0	0	0	0	0	1	0
Alloa Athletic	2003–04	Second Division	4	0	0	0	0	0	0	0	4	0
Alloa Athletic	2004–05	Second Division	0	0	0	0	0	0	0	0	0	0
Alloa Athletic	2005–06	Second Division	28	1	4	1	2	0	5 (Note: One appearance in the Scottish Challenge Cup and four in the Second Division play-offs)	0	39	2
Alloa Athletic	2006–07	Second Division	27	3	0	0	3	0	1 (Note: Appearances in the Scottish Challenge Cup)	0	31	3
Alloa Athletic	Total		59	4	4	1	5	0	6	0	74	5
Berwick Rangers	2007–08	Second Division	15	0	1	0	2	1	2	0	20	1
Berwick Rangers	Total		15	0	1	0	2	1	2	0	20	1
East Stirlingshire (loan)	2007–08	Third Division	9	3	0	0	0	0	0	0	9	3
East Stirlingshire	2008–09	Third Division	33	4	2	0	0	0	3 (Note: One appearance in the Scottish Challenge Cup and two in the Second Division play-offs)	0	38	4
East Stirlingshire	2009–10	Third Division	30	3	0	0	0	0	3 (Note: One appearance in the Scottish Challenge Cup and two in the Second Division play-offs)	0	33	3
East Stirlingshire	Total		72	10	2	0	0	0	6	0	80	10
Forfar Athletic	2010–11	Second Division	27	4	0	0	1	0	1 (Note: Appearance in the First Division play-offs)	0	29	4
Forfar Athletic	2011–12	Second Division	24	0	0	0	1	0	0	0	25	0
Forfar Athletic	2012–13	Second Division	27	2	2	0	1	0	4 (Note: Two appearances in the Scottish Challenge Cup and two in the First Division play-offs)	0	34	2
Forfar Athletic	Total		78	6	2	0	3	0	5	0	88	6
East Stirlingshire	2013–14	League Two	30	5	2	0	1	0	1	0	34	5
East Stirlingshire	2014–15	League Two	15	0	2	0	1	0	1	0	19	0
East Stirlingshire	Total		45	5	4	0	2	0	2	0	53	5
Clyde	2015–16	League Two	25	2	1	0	1	0	2 (Note: One appearance in the Scottish Challenge Cup and one in the League One play-offs)	1	29	3
Clyde	Total		25	2	1	0	1	0	2	1	29	3
Montrose	2016–17	League Two	26	3	2	0	3	1	0	0	31	4
Montrose	2017–18	League Two	0	0	0	0	0	0	0	0	0	0
Career totals			321	31	16	1	16	2	23	1	376	34
