= Craig Wilson (footballer) =

Scottish footballer

Personal information
- Full name: Craig Wilson
- Date of birth: 28 May 1986 (age 40)
- Place of birth: Dunfermline, Scotland
- Height: 5 ft 8 in (1.73 m)
- Positions: Defender; midfielder

Senior career*
Years	Team	Apps	(Gls)
2004–2007	Dunfermline Athletic	22	(0)
2006–2007	→ Raith Rovers (loan)	27	(1)
2007–2011	Raith Rovers	123	(1)
2011–2012	Forfar Athletic	16	(0)
2013–2014	Ballingry Rovers		
2014–2015	Linlithgow Rose		
2015–2016	Arbroath	25	(2)
- * Club domestic league appearances and goals as of 16:08, 7 November 2016 (UTC)

Craig Wilson (born 28 May 1986) is a Scottish footballer who plays as a defender. Wilson started his career with Dunfermline Athletic, and has also previously played for Raith Rovers, Forfar Athletic, Ballingry Rovers, Linlithgow Rose and most recently Arbroath.

== Career ==
Born in Dunfermline, Wilson attended Dunfermline High School where goalkeeper Greg Fleming was in the same year group. He began his career with hometown club Dunfermline Athletic, making his debut as a seventeen-year-old in April 2004. After playing two dozen first-team games for the Pars, Wilson spent most of the 2006–07 season on loan at Fife rivals Raith Rovers, joining permanently on a two-year deal at the start of the following season. Craig played every minute of every game during the 2007–08 season, which was repeated the following season.

Wilson signed for Forfar Athletic in 2011 but left the following summer, after a year out of the game he signed for junior side Ballingry Rovers in June 2013. Wilson was appointed club captain near the end of the 2013–14 season and played several games in centre midfield. Wilson subsequently had a spell with Linlithgow Rose, before signing for Scottish League Two side Arbroath at the start of the 2015–16 season. Wilson spent just one season with the Red Lichties before agreeing to leave the club in August 2016, having suffered an injury that restricted his playing time.

== Honours ==
=== Raith Rovers ===
- Scottish Second Division: 1

2008–09
