= Graham Gibson =

Scottish footballer

Personal information
- Full name: Graham Gibson
- Date of birth: 19 July 1980 (age 46)
- Place of birth: Kirkcaldy, Scotland
- Position: Striker

Senior career*
Years	Team	Apps	(Gls)
- Lochore Welfare
2002–2006	Brechin City	100	(18)
2006–2007	Partick Thistle	16	(1)
2007	→ East Fife (loan)	15	(1)
2007–2008	Stenhousemuir	19	(1)
2008–2012	Forfar Athletic	75	(4)
2012-2013	Ballingry		
- * Club domestic league appearances and goals

Graham Gibson (born 19 July 1980) is a Scottish footballer who last played senior football for Scottish Second Division side Forfar Athletic until 2012.

== Career ==
Gibson started off his career with Fife junior club Lochore Welfare, before making the move into senior football midway through the 2001–2002 season with then Third Division side Brechin City. His ability was recognised by Glasgow side Partick Thistle, who gave him a move up the leagues in 2006, to the First Division, although his time there was short - being sent on loan to East Fife before being released after just over a year to return to the Third Division with Stenhousemuir and then Forfar Athletic.

== After football ==
Since leaving Ballingry, he has been working full-time for The Courier.
