= Scottish Football League monthly awards =

Awards list

This article lists the winners of the monthly awards in the Scottish Football League.

== 2000–01 season ==
Month	First Division manager		Second Division manager		Third Division manager		Player		Young player	
Month	Manager	Club	Manager	Club	Manager	Club	Player	Club	Player	Club
September					Dick Campbell	Brechin City	Mark Kerr	Falkirk	Mark Kerr	Falkirk
October	Alex Totten	Falkirk	John Lambie	Partick Thistle	Ally Dawson	Hamilton Academical	Scott McLean	Partick Thistle	Mark Kerr	Falkirk
November	Steve Archibald	Airdrieonians	Brian Fairley	Stenhousemuir	John McVeigh	Albion Rovers	Antonio Calderon	Airdrieonians	Steven Ferguson	East Fife
December	Steve Patterson	Inverness CT	Paul Smith	Berwick Rangers	Dick Campbell	Brechin City	Dennis Wyness	Inverness CT		
March	Gordon Dalziel	Ayr United	John Brownlie	Arbroath	Dick Campbell	Brechin City	Eddie Annand	Ayr United	John Bradford	Ayr United

== 2001–02 season ==
Month	First Division manager		Second Division manager		Third Division manager		Player		Young player	
Month	Manager	Club	Manager	Club	Manager	Club	Player	Club	Player	Club
August	Ian McCall	Airdrieonians	Terry Christie	Alloa Athletic						
September	Ian McCall	Airdrieonians	John Connolly	Queen of the South	John Sheran	Montrose	Owen Coyle	Airdrieonians	Alex Williams	Stirling Albion
October	Ian McCall	Airdrieonians	John Connolly	Queen of the South	John McVeigh	Albion Rovers	The Airdrieonians team		Mark Booth	Albion Rovers
November	Allan Maitland	Clyde	Neil Cooper	Forfar Athletic	Dick Campbell	Brechin City	Willie Irvine	Stenhousemuir	Derek Lyle	East Stirling
December	John Lambie	Partick Thistle	Derek Ferguson	Clydebank	John McVeigh	Albion Rovers	Martin Hardie	Partick Thistle		
January					John McCormack	Queen's Park			Stewart Henderson	Brechin City
February	Gordon Dalziel	Ayr United	Terry Christie	Alloa Athletic	John McVeigh	Albion Rovers			Paul Shields	Clydebank
March					Dick Campbell	Brechin City	George Rowe	Arbroath	Lee Miller	Falkirk

Team of the Month

- January - Berwick Rangers

== 2002–03 season ==
Month	First Division manager		Second Division manager		Third Division manager		Player		Young player	
Month	Manager	Club	Manager	Club	Manager	Club	Player	Club	Player	Club
September									Ryan Blackadder	Raith Rovers
October	Steve Paterson	Inverness CT					Dennis Wyness	Inverness CT		
December					Peter Hetherston	Albion Rovers			Scott Shearer	Albion Rovers
January	Ian McCall	Falkirk					Colin Samuel	Falkirk	Mark Kerr	Falkirk
January			Keith Wright	Cowdenbeath	John McCormack	Greenock Morton				
March	Billy Stark	St Johnstone					Paul Hartley	St Johnstone		
April									Alex Williams	Greenock Morton

== 2003–04 season ==
Month	First Division manager		Second Division manager		Third Division manager		Player		Young player	
Month	Manager	Club	Manager	Club	Manager	Club	Player	Club	Player	Club
August	(Scotland) John Hughes	Falkirk	(Scotland) John McCormack	Greenock Morton	(Scotland) Allan Moore	Stirling Albion	(England) Peter Weatherson	Greenock Morton	(Scotland) John Sutton	Raith Rovers
September			(Scotland) Sandy Stewart	Airdrie United					(Scotland) David Dunn	Airdrie United
October	(Scotland) John Connolly	Queen of the South	(Scotland) John McCormack	Greenock Morton	(Scotland) Allan Moore	Stirling Albion	(Scotland) Colin McKinnon	Stirling Albion	(Scotland) Kirk Broadfoot	St Mirren
November			(Scotland) Ray Stewart	Forfar Athletic			(Scotland) Paul Tosh	Forfar Athletic		
December	(Republic of Ireland) Alan Kernaghan	Clyde	(Scotland) John McCormack	Greenock Morton			(Scotland) Ian Harty	Clyde		
January	(Scotland) Dick Campbell	Brechin City								
March	(Scotland) Sandy Stewart	Airdrie United					(Scotland) Willie McLaren	Airdrie United	(Scotland) Willie McLaren	Airdrie United

== 2004–05 season ==
Month	First Division manager		Second Division manager		Third Division manager		Player		Young player	
Month	Manager	Club	Manager	Club	Manager	Club	Player	Club	Player	Club
August	(Scotland) Billy Reid	Clyde	(Scotland) Allan Moore	Stirling Albion	(Scotland) Iain Stewart	Peterhead	(Scotland) Alex Burke	Ross County	(Scotland) Darryl Duffy	Falkirk
September	(Scotland) Gus MacPherson	St Mirren	(Scotland) Neil Watt	Stranraer	(Scotland) Iain Stewart	Peterhead	(Scotland) Scott Michie	Peterhead	(Scotland) Alex Walker	Clyde
October	(Scotland) John Hughes	Falkirk	(Scotland) Neil Watt	Stranraer	(Scotland) Rowan Alexander	Gretna	(Scotland) David Bingham	Gretna	(Scotland) David Graham	Stranraer
November	(Scotland) Sandy Stewart	Airdrie United	(Scotland) Dick Campbell	Brechin City	(Scotland) Dennis Newall	East Stirlingshire	(Scotland) Kenny Deuchar	Gretna	(Scotland) David Graham	Stranraer
December	(Scotland) John Connolly	St Johnstone	(Scotland) Tom Hendrie	Alloa Athletic	(Scotland) David Baikie	Cowdenbeath	(Scotland) Allan McGregor	St Johnstone	(Scotland) Darren Gribben	Cowdenbeath
January	(Scotland) Dick Campbell	Partick Thistle	(Scotland) Iain Campbell	Brechin City	(Scotland) Iain Stewart	Peterhead	(Scotland) Steven Hampshire	Brechin City	(France) Armand One	Partick Thistle
February	(Scotland) Allan Maitland	Hamilton Accies	(Scotland) Harry Cairney	Arbroath	(Scotland) Jimmy Lindsay	Albion Rovers	(Scotland) Paul McGrillen	Stenhousemuir	(Scotland) Alan Trouten	Queen's Park
March	(Scotland) John Hughes	Falkirk	(Scotland) Jim McInally	Greenock Morton	(Scotland) Rowan Alexander	Gretna	(Scotland) Kenny Deuchar	Gretna	(Scotland) Kirk Broadfoot	St Mirren
April	(Scotland) Allan Maitland	Hamilton	(Scotland) Rowan Alexander	Gretna	(Scotland) Neil Watt	Stranraer	(Trinidad and Tobago) Russell Latapy	Falkirk	(Scotland) Ryan McStay	Falkirk

== 2005–06 season ==
Month	First Division manager		Second Division manager		Third Division manager		Player		Young player	
Month	Manager	Club	Manager	Club	Manager	Club	Player	Club	Player	Club
August	(Scotland) John Robertson	Ross County	(Scotland) Robert Connor	Ayr United	(Scotland) John Coughlin	Berwick Rangers	(Scotland) Kevin McGowne	St Mirren	(Scotland) Tom Brighton	Clyde
September	(Scotland) Billy Reid	Hamilton Accies	(Scotland) Rowan Alexander	Gretna	(Scotland) John Coughlin	Berwick Rangers	(Scotland) Brian Carrigan	Hamilton Accies	(Scotland) Chris Smith	St Mirren
October	(Scotland) Billy Reid	Hamilton Accies	(Scotland) Rowan Alexander	Gretna	(Finland) Mixu Paatelainen	Berwick Rangers	(Finland) Jukka Santala	Partick Thistle	(Scotland) Bobby Linn	Peterhead
November	(Scotland) Gus MacPherson	St Mirren	(Scotland) Jim McInally	Greenock Morton	(Scotland) Des McKeown	Stenhousemuir	(Scotland) John Rankin	Ross County	(England) John Sutton	St Mirren
December	(Scotland) Sandy Stewart	Airdrie United	(Scotland) Allan Moore	Stirling Albion	(Scotland) Jamie McKenzie	Elgin City	(Scotland) Bryan Prunty	Airdrie United	(Scotland) Craig O'Reilly	Dundee
January	(Scotland) Gardner Speirs	Ross County	(Scotland) Rowan Alexander	Gretna	(Scotland) Billy Stark	Queen's Park	(Scotland) John Rankin	Ross County	(Scotland) Scott Murray	Dundee
February	(Scotland) Ian McCall	Queen of the South	(Scotland) Rowan Alexander	Gretna	(Finland) Mixu Paatelainen	Cowdenbeath	(Finland) Mikko Paatelainen	Cowdenbeath	(Scotland) Brian Deasley	Dundee
March	(Republic of Ireland) Owen Coyle	St Johnstone	(Scotland) Rowan Alexander	Gretna	(Scotland) John Coughlin	Berwick Rangers	(England) John Sutton	St Mirren	(Scotland) Brian Deasley	Dundee
April	(Scotland) Ian McCall	Queen of the South	(Scotland) Allan Maitland (Scotland) Iain Stewart	Alloa Athletic; Peterhead	(Finland) Mixu Paatelainen	Cowdenbeath	(Scotland) Martin Johnston (Scotland) Paul Mathers	Elgin City Peterhead	(Scotland) James McArthur	Hamilton Academical

== 2006–07 season ==
Month	First Division manager		Second Division manager		Third Division manager		Player		Young player	
Month	Manager	Club	Manager	Club	Manager	Club	Player	Club	Player	Club
August	(Scotland) Rowan Alexander	Gretna	(Scotland) Jim McInally	Greenock Morton	(Scotland) David Baikie	East Fife	(Scotland) Colin McMenamin	Gretna	(Scotland) Marc McKenzie	East Stirlingshire
September	(Scotland) Joe Miller	Clyde	(Scotland) Jim McInally	Greenock Morton	(Scotland) David Robertson	Montrose	(Scotland) Bobby Linn	Peterhead	(Scotland) Kevin McDonald	Dundee
October	(Scotland) Dick Campbell	Partick Thistle	(Scotland) Alan Maitland	Alloa Athletic	(Scotland) Gerry McCabe	Dumbarton	(Scotland) Paul Sheerin	St Johnstone	(Scotland) Craig O'Reilly	East Fife
November	(Scotland) Rowan Alexander	Gretna	(Scotland) Allan Moore	Stirling Albion	(Scotland) Billy Stark	Queen's Park	(Scotland) Colin McMenamin	Gretna	(Scotland) David Weatherston	Queen's Park
December	(Scotland) Kenny Black	Airdrie United	(Scotland) Jim McInally	Greenock Morton	(Scotland) John Coughlin	Berwick Rangers	(Scotland) Gary Twigg	Airdrie United	(Scotland) Liam Buchanan	Cowdenbeath
January	(Scotland) Alex Rae	Dundee	(Scotland) John McGlynn	Raith Rovers	(Scotland) Jim Chapman	Albion Rovers	(Scotland) Martin Bavidge	Peterhead	(Scotland) Paul McGowan	Greenock Morton
February	(Republic of Ireland) Owen Coyle	St Johnstone	(Northern Ireland) Michael O'Neill	Brechin City	(Scotland) Billy Stark	Queen's Park	(Scotland) Iain Russell	Brechin City	(Scotland) Derek Carcary	Raith Rovers
March	(Scotland) Ian McCall	Queen of the South	(Scotland) Allan Moore	Stirling Albion	(Scotland) John McGlashan	Arbroath	(Scotland) Martin Hardie	St Johnstone	(Scotland) Jamie MacDonald	Queen of the South

== 2007–08 season ==
Month	First Division manager		Second Division manager		Third Division manager		Player		Young player	
Month	Manager	Club	Manager	Club	Manager	Club	Player	Club	Player	Club
August	(Scotland) Billy Reid	Hamilton Academical	(Scotland) Billy Stark	Queen's Park	(Scotland) Gordon Wylde	East Stirlingshire	(England) Richard Offiong	Hamilton Academical	(Scotland) Kevin McDonald	Dundee
September	(Republic of Ireland) Owen Coyle	St Johnstone	(Scotland) Steve Paterson	Peterhead	(Scotland) John McGlashan	Arbroath	(Scotland) Ryan Stevenson	Ayr United	(Scotland) James McArthur	Hamilton Academical
October	(Scotland) Billy Reid	Hamilton Academical	(Scotland) Alan Maitland	Alloa Athletic	(Scotland) David Baikie	East Fife	(England) Bryn Halliwell	Hamilton Academical	(Republic of Ireland) James McCarthy	Hamilton Academical
November	(Scotland) Alex Rae	Dundee	(Scotland) Derek Adams	Ross County	(Scotland) David Baikie	East Fife	(Scotland) Kenny Deuchar	St Johnstone	(Scotland) Scott Fox	East Fife
December	(Scotland) Jim McIntyre	Dunfermline Athletic	(Northern Ireland) Michael O'Neill	Brechin City	(Scotland) Gerry Britton	Stranraer	(Scotland) Allan Russell	Airdrie United	(Scotland) Kevin McDonald	Dundee
January	(Scotland) Gordon Chisholm	Queen of the South	(Scotland) Derek Adams	Ross County	(Scotland) David Baikie	East Fife	(Scotland) Andrew Barrowman	Ross County	(Republic of Ireland) Andy Jackson	St Johnstone
February	(Scotland) Gordon Chisholm	Queen of the South	(Scotland) Neale Cooper	Peterhead	(Scotland) Derek Ferguson	Stranraer	(France) Mickaël Antoine-Curier	Dundee	(Scotland) Graham Dorrans	Livingston
March	(Scotland) Ian McCall	Partick Thistle	(Scotland) Brian Reid	Ayr United	(Scotland) Robbie Williamson	Elgin City	(Northern Ireland) Jonathan Tuffey	Partick Thistle	(Scotland) Leigh Griffiths	Livingston
April	(Scotland) Gordon Chisholm	Queen of the South	(Scotland) Alan Maitland	Alloa Athletic	(Scotland) Derek Ferguson	Stranraer	(Scotland) Mark McLaughlin	Hamilton Academical	(Scotland) Brian Easton	Hamilton Academical

== 2008–09 season ==
Month	First Division manager		Second Division manager		Third Division manager		Player		Young player	
Month	Manager	Club	Manager	Club	Manager	Club	Player	Club	Player	Club
August	(Italy) Roberto Landi	Livingston	(Scotland) Brian Reid	Ayr United	(Scotland) Harry Cairney	Annan Athletic	(Scotland) Stephen Robertson	Airdrie United	(Scotland) Leigh Griffiths	Livingston
September	(Scotland) Jim McIntyre	Dunfermline Athletic	(Scotland) David Baikie	East Fife	(Scotland) John Coughlin	Stenhousemuir	(Scotland) Paul McManus	East Fife	(Scotland) Calum Elliot	Livingston
October	(Scotland) Derek McInnes	St Johnstone	(Northern Ireland) Michael O'Neill	Brechin City	(Scotland) Jim Chapman	Dumbarton	(Scotland) Steven Milne	St Johnstone	(England) Dominic Shimmin	Greenock Morton
November	(Scotland) Jocky Scott	Dundee	(Scotland) Brian Reid	Ayr United	(Scotland) Jim McInally	East Stirlingshire	(Scotland) Bryan Prunty	Ayr United	(Scotland) Kyle Benedictus	Dundee
December	(Scotland) John Brown	Clyde	(Scotland) David Baikie	East Fife	(Scotland) Jimmy Crease	Berwick Rangers	(Scotland) Alan Main	St Johnstone	(Scotland) Chris McMenamin	Berwick Rangers
January	(Scotland) Ian McCall	Partick Thistle	(Scotland) Allan Moore	Stirling Albion	(Scotland) Danny Lennon	Cowdenbeath	(Scotland) Willie McLaren	Clyde	(Scotland) Bobby Barr	Albion Rovers
February	(Scotland) Jocky Scott	Dundee	(Scotland) Allan Maitland	Alloa Athletic	(Scotland) Jim McInally	East Stirlingshire	(Scotland) Gary Harkins	Partick Thistle	(Scotland) Fraser McLaren	Berwick Rangers
March	(Scotland) Paul Hegarty	Livingston	(Scotland) Brian Reid	Ayr United	(Scotland) Dick Campbell	Forfar Athletic	(Scotland) Kevin Rutkiewicz	St Johnstone	(Scotland) Leigh Griffiths	Livingston
April	(Scotland) Gordon Chisholm	Queen of the South	(Scotland) John McGlynn	Raith Rovers	(Scotland) Jim Chapman	Dumbarton	(Scotland) Stephen Dobbie	Queen of the South	(Scotland) Kevin Moon	St Johnstone

== 2009–10 season ==
Month	First Division manager		Second Division manager		Third Division manager		Player		Young player	
Month	Manager	Club	Manager	Club	Manager	Club	Player	Club	Player	Club
August	(Scotland) Gordon Chisholm	Queen of the South	(Scotland) Allan Maitland	Alloa Athletic	(Scotland) Dick Campbell	Forfar Athletic	(Scotland) Gary Harkins	Dundee	(Scotland) Iain Vigurs	Ross County
September	(Scotland) Jocky Scott	Dundee	(Scotland) Allan Moore	Stirling Albion	(Scotland) Jim McInally	East Stirlingshire	(Scotland) Derek Gaston	Albion Rovers	(Scotland) Leigh Griffiths	Dundee
October	(Scotland) Jocky Scott	Dundee	(Scotland) Danny Lennon	Cowdenbeath	(Scotland) Gary Bollan	Livingston	(England) Tony Bullock	Dundee	(Scotland) Leigh Griffiths	Dundee
November	(Scotland) Jim McIntyre	Dunfermline Athletic	(Scotland) Danny Lennon	Cowdenbeath	(Scotland) Gary Bollan	Livingston	(Republic of Ireland) Jonny Hayes	Inverness Caledonian Thistle	(South Africa) Keaghan Jacobs	Livingston
December	(Scotland) Jocky Scott	Dundee	(Scotland) Allan Maitland	Alloa Athletic	(Scotland) Jim McInally	East Stirlingshire	(Scotland) Gary Harkins	Dundee	(Scotland) Andy Halliday	Livingston
January	(Scotland) Derek Adams	Ross County	(Scotland) Allan Maitland	Alloa Athletic	(Scotland) Gardner Speirs	Queen's Park	(Scotland) Paul Lawson	Ross County	(Scotland) Barry Douglas	Queen's Park
February	(Scotland) John McGlynn	Raith Rovers	(Scotland) Jim Weir	Arbroath	(Scotland) Dick Campbell	Forfar Athletic	(Scotland) Stuart Noble	Alloa Athletic	(Scotland) Callum Booth	Arbroath
March	(England) Terry Butcher	Inverness Caledonian Thistle	(Scotland) Danny Lennon	Cowdenbeath	(Scotland) Steven Tweed	Montrose	(Republic of Ireland) Adam Rooney	Inverness Caledonian Thistle	(Scotland) Michael Tidser	Greenock Morton
April	(Scotland) Kenny Black	Airdrie United	(Scotland) Allan Moore	Stirling Albion	(Scotland) Dick Campbell	Forfar Athletic	(Republic of Ireland) Jonny Hayes	Inverness Caledonian Thistle	(Scotland) Connor Stevenson	Clyde

== 2010–11 season ==
Month	First Division manager		Second Division manager		Third Division manager		Player		Young player		Ginger Boot	
Month	Manager	Club	Manager	Club	Manager	Club	Player	Club	Player	Club	Player	Club
August	(Scotland) John McGlynn	Raith Rovers	(Scotland) Jim Weir	Brechin City	(Scotland) Jimmy Crease	Berwick Rangers	(Northern Ireland) Andy Kirk	Dunfermline Athletic	(Scotland) Marc McCusker	Clyde	(Northern Ireland) Andy Kirk	Dunfermline Athletic
September	(Northern Ireland) Jimmy Nicholl	Cowdenbeath	(Scotland) Jimmy Boyle	Airdrie United	(Scotland) Paul Martin	Albion Rovers	(Scotland) David Hay	Cowdenbeath	(Scotland) Aaron Sinclair	Montrose	(Scotland) Darren Gribben	Berwick Rangers
October	(Scotland) John McGlynn	Raith Rovers	(Scotland) Jim Weir	Brechin City	(Scotland) Ross Jack	Elgin City	(Scotland) Willie Gibson	Dunfermline Athletic	(Scotland) Ryan Flynn	Falkirk	(Scotland) Rory McAllister	Brechin City
November	(Scotland) Barry Smith	Dundee	(Scotland) John Robertson	East Fife	(Scotland) Paul Sheerin	Arbroath	(Scotland) Steven Doris	Arbroath	(Scotland) Leigh Griffiths	Dundee	(Scotland) Steven Doris	Arbroath
December	(Scotland) Barry Smith	Dundee	(Scotland) Neale Cooper	Peterhead	(Scotland) Ross Jack	Elgin City	(Scotland) Mark Campbell	Raith Rovers	(Scotland) Tony Watt	Airdrie United	(Scotland) Rory McAllister	Brechin City
January	(Scotland) Ian McCall	Partick Thistle	(Scotland) Brian Reid	Ayr United	(Scotland) Jim McInally	East Stirlingshire	(Scotland) Scott Fox	Partick Thistle	(England) Josh Falkingham	Arbroath	(Scotland) Gavin Swankie	Arbroath
February	(Scotland) Barry Smith	Dundee	(Scotland) Alan Adamson	Dumbarton	(Scotland) Gardner Spiers	Queen's Park	(Scotland) Andy Millen	Queen's Park	(Scotland) Jon McShane	Dumbarton	(France) Armand One	Stranraer
March	(Scotland) Jim McIntyre	Dunfermline Athletic	(Scotland) Gary Bollan	Livingston	(Scotland) Harry Cairney	Annan Athletic	(Scotland) Iain Russell	Livingston	(Scotland) Greg Stewart	Cowdenbeath	(Scotland) Iain Russell	Livingston
April	(Scotland) Jim McIntyre	Dunfermline Athletic	(Scotland) Dick Campbell	Forfar Athletic	(Scotland) Paul Martin	Albion Rovers	(Scotland) Martin Hardie	Dunfermline Athletic	(Scotland) Leighton McIntosh	Dundee	(Scotland) Ryan Wallace	East Fife

- Alloa Athletic chairman Mike Mulraney also awarded a Phenomenal Achievement Award for December 2010.

== 2011–12 season ==
Month	First Division manager		Second Division manager		Third Division manager		Player		Young player		Ginger Boot	
Month	Manager	Club	Manager	Club	Manager	Club	Player	Club	Player	Club	Player	Club
August	(Scotland) Allan Moore	Greenock Morton	(Scotland) Paul Sheerin	Arbroath	(Scotland) Harry Cairney	Annan Athletic	(Scotland) Dougie Imrie	Hamilton Academical	(Scotland) Craig Sibbald	Falkirk	(Scotland) Craig Gunn	Elgin City
September	(Scotland) Steven Pressley	Falkirk	(Scotland) Colin Cameron	Cowdenbeath	(Scotland) Paul Hartley	Alloa Athletic	(Morocco) Farid El Alagui	Falkirk	(Scotland) Mark Ridgers	East Fife	(Scotland) Peter MacDonald	Greenock Morton
October	(Scotland) Derek Adams (Scotland) Steven Pressley	Ross County Falkirk	(Scotland) John Robertson	East Fife	(Scotland) Gardner Speirs	Queen's Park	(Scotland) Darren Dods (Scotland) Grant Munro	Falkirk Ross County	(Scotland) Aaron Sinclair	Partick Thistle	(Scotland) Ryan Donnelly	Airdrie United
November	(Scotland) Barry Smith	Dundee	(Scotland) Colin Cameron	Cowdenbeath	(Scotland) Ian Little	Berwick Rangers	(Scotland) Nicky Riley	Dundee	(Scotland) Ryan Donnelly	Airdrie United	(Scotland) Darren Gribben	Berwick Rangers
December	(Scotland) Jackie McNamara	Partick Thistle	(Scotland) Jim Weir	Brechin City	(Scotland) Keith Knox	Stranraer	(Morocco) Farid El Alagui	Falkirk	(Scotland) Stephen Stirling	Stranraer	(Scotland) Stephen Stirling	Stranraer
January	(Scotland) Steven Pressley	Falkirk	(Scotland) Alan Adamson	Dumbarton	(Scotland) Paul Hartley	Alloa Athletic	(Scotland) Stevie May	Alloa Athletic	(Scotland) Stevie May	Alloa Athletic	(Scotland) Stevie May	Alloa Athletic
February	(Scotland) Steven Pressley	Falkirk	(Scotland) Alan Adamson	Dumbarton	(Scotland) Ross Jack	Elgin City	(Scotland) Steven Doris	Arbroath	(Scotland) Andy Ryan	Hamilton Academical	(Scotland) Lewis Coult	Cowdenbeath
March	(Scotland) Derek Adams	Ross County	(Scotland) Jimmy Boyle	Airdrie United	(Scotland) Paul Hartley	Alloa Athletic	(Scotland) Richard Brittain	Ross County	(Scotland) Owen Ronald	Queen's Park	(Scotland) Ryan Wallace	East Fife
April	(Scotland) John McGlynn	Raith Rovers	(Scotland) Jimmy Boyle	Airdrie United	(Scotland) Jim McInally	Peterhead	(Scotland) Paul Cairney	Partick Thistle	(Scotland) Nicky Devlin	Stenhousemuir	(England) Rory Boulding	Livingston

=== Goal of the Month winners ===
- July / August 2011: (Scotland) Annan Athletic striker David Cox
- October 2011: (Scotland) Stenhousemuir striker Andy Rodgers.
- November 2011: (Scotland) Clyde defender Gavin Brown.
- December 2011: (South Africa) Livingston striker Keaghan Jacobs.
- January 2012: (Scotland) Dundee striker Steven Milne.
- February 2012: (Scotland) Falkirk midfielder Jay Fulton
- March 2012: (Scotland) Dumbarton striker Bryan Prunty.
- April / May 2012: (Scotland) Ayr United striker Keigan Parker

== 2012–13 season ==
Month	First Division manager		Second Division manager		Third Division manager		Player		Young player		Ginger Boot	
Month	Manager	Club	Manager	Club	Manager	Club	Player	Club	Player	Club	Player	Club
August	(Scotland) Jackie McNamara	Partick Thistle	(Scotland) Allan Johnston	Queen of the South	(Scotland) Jim McInally	Peterhead	(Scotland) John Boyle	Airdrie United	(Scotland) Steven Lawless	Partick Thistle	(Northern Ireland) Andy Little	Rangers
September	(Scotland) Jim Jefferies	Dunfermline Athletic	(Scotland) Allan Johnston	Queen of the South	(Scotland) Gardner Speirs	Queen's Park	(Scotland) David Anderson	Queen's Park	(Scotland) Archie Campbell	Greenock Morton	(Scotland) Archie Campbell	Greenock Morton
October	(Scotland) Allan Moore	Greenock Morton	(Scotland) Paul Hartley	Alloa Athletic	(Scotland) Greig McDonald (Scotland) Shaun Fagan (Scotland) Marc McCulloch	Stirling Albion	(Scotland) Archie Campbell	Greenock Morton	(Scotland) David Hopkirk	Annan Athletic	(Scotland) David Hopkirk	Annan Athletic
November	(Scotland) Billy Reid	Hamilton Academical	(Scotland) Ray McKinnon	Brechin City	(Scotland) Stuart Garden	Montrose	(Scotland) Nicky Clark	Queen of the South	(Scotland) Lewis Macleod	Rangers	(Republic of Ireland) Andy Jackson	Brechin City
December	(Scotland) Allan Moore	Greenock Morton	(Scotland) Allan Johnston	Queen of the South	(Scotland) Ally McCoist	Rangers	(England) Lyle Taylor	Falkirk	(Scotland) Aidan Connolly	Queen's Park	(England) Lyle Taylor	Falkirk
January	(Scotland) Ian Murray	Dumbarton	(Scotland) Allan Johnston	Queen of the South	(Scotland) Gardner Spiers	Queen's Park	(Spain) Jesús García Tena	Livingston	(Scotland) Stuart Bannigan	Partick Thistle	(Scotland) Nicky Clark	Queen of the South
February	(Scotland) Alan Archibald	Partick Thistle	(Scotland) Martyn Corrigan	Stenhousemuir	(Scotland) Greig McDonald	Stirling Albion	(Scotland) Peter MacDonald	Greenock Morton	(Scotland) Martin Boyle	Montrose	(Northern Ireland) Andy Little	Rangers
March	(Scotland) Alan Archibald	Partick Thistle	(Scotland) Allan Johnston	Queen of the South	(Scotland) Greig McDonald	Stirling Albion	(Scotland) Kris Doolan	Partick Thistle	(Scotland) Craig Moore	Cowdenbeath	(Scotland) Rory McAllister	Peterhead
April	(Scotland) Alex Neil	Hamilton Academical	(Scotland) Martyn Corrigan	Stenhousemuir	(Scotland) Jim McInally	Peterhead	(Scotland) Steven May	Hamilton Academical	(Scotland) Steven May	Hamilton Academical	(Scotland) Steven May	Hamilton Academical

=== Goal of the Month winners ===
- July / August 2012: (Scotland) Livingston midfielder Dylan Easton
- September 2012: (Scotland) East Fife midfielder Jamie Pollock
- October 2012: (Scotland) Dunfermline Athletic striker Ryan Wallace
- November 2012: (Scotland) Queen's Park defender Andy Robertson
- January 2013: (Scotland) Queen of the South striker Nicky Clark
- February 2013: (Scotland) Dumbarton striker Bryan Prunty

== See also ==
- Scottish Football League Yearly Awards
- Scottish Premier League monthly awards
- Scottish Professional Football League monthly awards
