= Scottish Football League yearly awards =

This article lists the winners of the annual end-of-season awards in the Scottish Football League (SFL).

The end-of-season annual awards were made by the Scottish Football League (SFL) until the league ceased operating after the end of the 2012–13 season. The awards were presented by the various sponsors of the Scottish Football League (SFL), including Bell's (1994–1998 and 1999–2006) and Irn-Bru (2007–2013).

== Winners ==
=== Before 1998 ===
Season	Award	Winner	Club	Ref
1994–95	Scottish Manager of the Year	(Northern Ireland) Jimmy Nicholl	Raith Rovers	
1994–95	Premier Division Manager of the Year	(Scotland) Jim Jefferies	Falkirk	
1994–95	Second Division Manager of the Year	(Scotland) Allan McGraw	Greenock Morton	
1994–95	Third Division Manager of the Year	(Scotland) Tommy Campbell	Forfar Athletic	
1995–96	Scottish Manager of the Year	(Scotland) Walter Smith	Rangers	
1995–96	First Division Manager of the Year	(Scotland) Allan McGraw	Greenock Morton	
1995–96	Second Division Manager of the Year	(Scotland) Kevin Drinkell	Stirling Albion	
1995–96	Third Division Manager of the Year	(Scotland) Jim Leishman	Livingston	
1996–97	Scottish Manager of the Year	(Scotland) Walter Smith	Rangers	
1996–97	First Division Manager of the Year	(Scotland) Paul Sturrock	St Johnstone	
1996–97	Second Division Manager of the Year	(Scotland) Sandy Clark	Hamilton Accies	
1996–97	Third Division Manager of the Year	(Scotland) Steve Paterson	Inverness CT	
1996–97	Young Player of the Year	(Scotland) Alex Burke	Kilmarnock	
1997–98	Scottish Manager of the Year	(Scotland) Jim Jefferies	Heart of Midlothian	
1997–98	First Division Manager of the Year	(Scotland) Alex Totten	Falkirk	
1997–98	Second Division Manager of the Year	(Scotland) Campbell Money	Stranraer	
1997–98	Third Division Manager of the Year	(Scotland) Tom Hendrie	Alloa Athletic	

=== 1998–2006 ===
Season	First Division Manager		Second Division Manager		Third Division Manager		Ref
Season	Winner	Club	Winner	Club	Winner	Club	Ref
1999–2000	(Scotland) Tom Hendrie	St Mirren	(Scotland) Allan Maitland	Clyde	(Scotland) John McCormack	Queen's Park	
2000–01	(Scotland) Jim Leishman	Livingston	(Scotland) John Lambie	Partick Thistle	(Scotland) Ally Dawson	Hamilton Academical	
2001–02	(Scotland) John Lambie	Partick Thistle	(Scotland) John Connolly	Queen of the South	(Scotland) Dick Campbell	Brechin City	
2002–03	(Republic of Ireland) Alan Kernaghan	Clyde	(Spain) Antonio Calderón / (Scotland) Dick Campbell	Raith Rovers / Brechin City	(Scotland) Ian Wilson	Peterhead	
2003–04	(Scotland) John Robertson	Inverness CT			(Scotland) Neil Watt	Stranraer	
2004–05	(Scotland) John Hughes	Falkirk	(Scotland) Neil Watt	Stranraer	(Scotland) Rowan Alexander	Gretna	
2005–06	(Scotland) Gus McPherson	St Mirren	(Scotland) Rowan Alexander	Gretna	(Finland) Mixu Paatelainen	Cowdenbeath	

Season	SFL Player		SFL Young Player		Ref
Season	Winner	Club	Winner	Club	Ref
1999–2000	(Scotland) Mark Yardley	St Mirren	(Scotland) Brian Carrigan	Clyde	
2000–01	(Scotland) David Bingham	Livingston	(Scotland) Mark Kerr	Falkirk	
2001–02	(Republic of Ireland) Owen Coyle	Airdrieonians	(Scotland) Alex Williams	Stirling Albion	
2002–03	(Republic of Ireland) Owen Coyle	Falkirk	(Scotland) Lee Miller	Falkirk	
2004–05	(Scotland) Kenny Deuchar	Gretna	(Scotland) Darryl Duffy	Falkirk	
2005–06	(Scotland) John Rankin	Ross County			

Season	Other Award(s)	Winner	Club	Ref
2000–01	Team of the Season	Livingston		
2000–01	Fair Play Award	Partick Thistle		
2000–01	Pie of the Year	East Fife		
2001–02	Bell's Angel (Fair Play)	East Fife		
2001–02	Pie of the Year	Clyde		
2003–04	Fair Play Award	Queen of the South		
2003–04	Fan of the Year	Ian Black	Queen of the South	
2004–05	Lifetime Achievement Award	(Scotland) Willie Young		
2004–05	Fair Play Award	Gretna		
2004–05	Fan of the Year	Colin Mitchell	Hamilton Academical	
2004–05	Supporters Bar of the Year	The Port Cullis	Arbroath	
2004–05	Pie of the Year	East Fife		

=== 2007–2013 ===
Season	First Division Manager		Second Division Manager		Third Division Manager		Ref
Season	Winner	Club	Winner	Club	Winner	Club	Ref
2007–08	(Scotland) Billy Reid	Hamilton Academical	(Scotland) Derek Adams	Ross County	(Scotland) Dave Baikie	East Fife	
2008–09	(Scotland) Derek McInnes	St Johnstone	(Scotland) John McGlynn	Raith Rovers	(Scotland) Jim Chapman	Dumbarton	
2009–10	(England) Terry Butcher	Inverness CT	(Scotland) Allan Moore	Stirling Albion	(Scotland) Gary Bollan	Livingston	
2010–11	(Scotland) Jim McIntyre	Dunfermline Athletic	(Scotland) Gary Bollan	Livingston	(Scotland) Paul Sheerin	Arbroath	
2011–12	(Scotland) Derek Adams	Ross County	(Scotland) Colin Cameron	Cowdenbeath	(Scotland) Paul Hartley	Alloa Athletic	
2012–13	(Scotland) Ian Murray	Dumbarton	(Scotland) Allan Johnston	Queen of the South	(Scotland) Alistair McCoist	Rangers	

Season	First Division Player		Second Division Player		Third Division Player		Ref
Season	Winner	Club	Winner	Club	Winner	Club	Ref
2007–08	(England) Richard Offiong	Hamilton Academical	(Scotland) Andy Barrowman	Ross County	(Scotland) Jonathan Smart	East Fife	
2008–09	(Scotland) Gary Harkins	Partick Thistle	(Scotland) Bryan Prunty	Ayr United	(Scotland) Bobby Barr	Albion Rovers	
2009–10	(Republic of Ireland) Adam Rooney	Inverness CT	(Scotland) Rory McAllister	Brechin City	(Scotland) Robbie Winters	Livingston	
2010–11	(Scotland) John Baird	Raith Rovers	(Scotland) Rory McAllister	Brechin City	(Scotland) Gavin Swankie	Arbroath	
2011–12	(Scotland) Colin McMenamin	Ross County	(Scotland) Ryan Donnelly	Airdrie United	(Scotland) Stevie May	Alloa Athletic	
2012–13	(England) Lyle Taylor	Falkirk	(Scotland) Nicky Clark	Queen of the South	(Scotland) David Anderson	Queen's Park	

Season	SFL Young Player		Goal of the Season		Phenomenal Achievement		Ref
Season	Winner	Club	Winner	Club	Winner	Club	Ref
2007–08	(Republic of Ireland) James McCarthy	Hamilton Academical			(Scotland) Gordon Chisholm	Queen of the South	
2008–09	(Scotland) Leigh Griffiths	Livingston	(Scotland) Liam Craig	St Johnstone	(Scotland) Jim McInally	East Stirlingshire	
2009–10	(Scotland) Leigh Griffiths	Dundee	(Scotland) Jonathan Smart	East Fife	(Scotland) Derek Adams	Ross County	
2010–11	(England) Josh Falkingham	Arbroath	(Scotland) Willie McLaren	Queen of the South	(Scotland) Barry Smith	Dundee	
2011–12	(Scotland) Stevie May	Alloa Athletic	(Scotland) Keigan Parker	Ayr United	(Scotland) Derek Adams	Ross County	
2012–13	(Scotland) Stevie May	Hamilton Academical	(Scotland) Bryan Prunty	Dumbarton	(Scotland) Dennis McCleary	Berwick Rangers	

Season	Team of the Season	Ginger Boot		Ref
Season	Team of the Season	Winner	Club	Ref
2007–08	Hamilton Academical	award didn't exist		
2008–09	St Johnstone	award didn't exist		
2009–10	Ross County	award didn't exist		
2010–11	Raith Rovers	(Scotland) Mark Roberts (Scotland) Iain Russell (Scotland) Gavin Swankie	Ayr United; Livingston; Arbroath	
2011–12	Ross County	(Scotland) Martin Boyle	Montrose	
2012–13	Queen of the South	(Scotland) Nicky Clark	Queen of the South	

Season	Other Award(s)	Winner	Club	Ref
2008–09	Phenomenal Contribution of the Season	(Scotland) Harry Cairney	Annan Athletic	
2009–10	Phenomenal Achievement over the Past Three Seasons	(Scotland) Derek Adams	Ross County	
2012–13	Goalkeeper of the Season	(England) Lee Robinson	Queen of the South	

== See also ==
- Scottish Football League monthly awards
- Scottish Premier League Yearly Awards
- Scottish Professional Football League yearly awards
