= 2011–12 Scottish Third Division =

Irn Bru Scottish Third Division
- Season: 2011–12
- Champions: Alloa Athletic
- Promoted: Alloa Athletic; Stranraer
- Relegated: n/a
- Matches: 180
- Goals: 581 (3.23 per match)
- Top goalscorer: Martin Boyle (22)
- Biggest home win: Alloa Athletic 8–1 Elgin City (7 April 2012)
- Biggest away win: Montrose 0–6 Stranraer (27 August 2011)
- Highest scoring: East Stirlingshire 6–3 Peterhead (3 March 2012); Alloa Athletic 8–1 Elgin City (7 April 2012)
- Longest winning run: 7 games Alloa Athletic
- Longest unbeaten run: 15 games Alloa Athletic
- Longest winless run: 12 games East Stirlingshire
- Longest losing run: 10 games East Stirlingshire
- Highest attendance: 2,551; Alloa Athletic v Annan Athletic (5 May 2012)
- Lowest attendance: 215; East Stirlingshire v Annan Athletic (3 December 2011)
- Average attendance: 475

The 2011–12 Scottish Football League Third Division (also known as the 2011–12 Irn Bru Scottish Football League Third Division for sponsorship reasons) was the 18th season in the current format of 10 teams in the fourth-tier of Scottish football. The season started on 6 August 2011 and finished on 5 May 2012.

Alloa Athletic secured the Third Division title on 7 April 2012, ending their one-year spell in the bottom tier of the Scottish Football League. A second promotion place is available through the play-offs which will be contested by runners-up Queen's Park along with Stranraer, Elgin City, and Albion Rovers of the Second Division. There is no relegation from this division but East Stirlingshire finished bottom for the sixth time in 10 years.

== Teams ==
Location of teams in 2011–12 Scottish Third Division

A total of 10 teams competed in the league, including eight sides from the previous season and the two teams relegated from the 2010–11 Scottish Second Division.

Arbroath as champions of the 2010–11 season were directly promoted to the 2011–12 Scottish Second Division. Thus completing only a one-year stay in the bottom tier of the Scottish Football League. In the process, winning the club's first ever senior silverware since the club was founded in 1878 − 133 years ago. They were replaced by Peterhead who finished bottom of the 2010–11 Scottish Second Division, relegated for the first time since joining the Scottish Football League in 2000.

A second promotion place was available via a play-off tournament between the ninth-placed team of the 2010–11 Scottish Second Division, Alloa Athletic, and the sides ranked second, third and fourth of the 2010–11 Scottish Third Division; Albion Rovers, Queen's Park and Annan Athletic respectively. The play off was won by Albion Rovers who defeated Annan Athletic in the final. Alloa Athletic were therefore relegated.

=== Stadia and locations ===
Team	Location	Stadium	Capacity	Average
Alloa Athletic	Alloa	Recreation Park	3,100	672
Annan Athletic	Annan	Galabank	2,007	473
Berwick Rangers	Berwick-upon-Tweed	Shielfield Park	4,065	396
Clyde	Cumbernauld	Broadwood	8,006	566
East Stirlingshire	Stenhousemuir	Ochilview Park^{[A]}	3,746	321
Elgin City	Elgin	Borough Briggs	3,927	628
Montrose	Montrose	Links Park	3,292	335
Peterhead	Peterhead	Balmoor	3,150	488
Queen's Park	Glasgow	Hampden Park	52,025	519
Stranraer	Stranraer	Stair Park	6,250	354

A.East Stirlingshire ground shared with Stenhousemuir.

=== Personnel and kits ===
Note: Flags indicate national team as has been defined under FIFA eligibility rules. Players may hold more than one non-FIFA nationality.

Team	Manager	Kit manufacturer	Shirt sponsor
Alloa Athletic	(Scotland) Paul Hartley	Pendle	mte
Annan Athletic	(Scotland) Harry Cairney	Stanno	M&S Engineering
Berwick Rangers	(Scotland) Jimmy Crease	Zoo Sport	JB Site Investigations
Clyde	(Scotland) Jim Duffy	Joma	Floortel
East Stirlingshire	(Scotland) John Coughlin	Jako	Foxlane
Elgin City	(Scotland) Ross Jack	Hummel	
Montrose	(Scotland) Ray Farningham	Nike	Fotheringham Property Developments
Peterhead	(Scotland) Jim McInally	Umbro	Bon Accord Glass
Queen's Park	(Scotland) Gardner Speirs	Joma	Irn-Bru
Stranraer	(Scotland) Keith Knox	Stanno	Stena Line

== League table ==
Pos	Team	Pld	W	D	L	GF	GA	GD	Pts	Promotion or qualification
1	Alloa Athletic (C, P)	36	23	8	5	70	39	+31	77	Promotion to the Second Division
2	Queen's Park	36	19	6	11	70	48	+22	63	Qualification for the Second Division Play-offs
3	Stranraer (P)	36	17	7	12	77	57	+20	58 (Note: Stranraer advanced to the final of the Second Division play-offs but were defeated by Albion Rovers, who retained their place in the Second Division. However, following the demotion of Rangers to the Third Division, Dundee were promoted from the First Division to the SPL, Airdrie United promoted from the Second to the First Division, and Stranraer were promoted from the Third to the Second Division.)	Qualification for the Second Division Play-offs
4	Elgin City	36	16	9	11	68	60	+8	57	Qualification for the Second Division Play-offs
5	Peterhead	36	15	6	15	51	53	−2	51	
6	Annan Athletic	36	13	10	13	53	53	0	49	
7	Berwick Rangers	36	12	12	12	61	58	+3	48	
8	Montrose	36	11	5	20	58	75	−17	38	
9	Clyde	36	8	11	17	35	50	−15	35	
10	East Stirlingshire	36	6	6	24	38	88	−50	24	

Source: SPFL Archive
Rules for classification: 1) points; 2) goal difference; 3) number of goals scored.
(C) Champions; (P) Promoted

== Results ==
Each team plays every other team four times in the season. In each half of the season, a team plays every opponent once at home and once away from home. The same set of fixtures is repeated for the second half of the season, bringing each team's tally of games to 36.

=== First half of season ===
Home \ Away	ALO	ANN	BER	CLY	EST	ELG	MON	PET	QPA	STR
Alloa Athletic		1–0	1–1	2–2	1–1	3–0	4–2	2–1	1–0	1–0
Annan Athletic	2–0		2–2	1–0	3–0	1–1	2–1	2–0	5–2	0–3
Berwick Rangers	2–2	0–1		0–2	4–2	1–1	1–2	2–1	2–0	2–2
Clyde	0–1	0–0	1–4		7–1	1–2	1–0	2–0	0–2	1–1
East Stirlingshire	0–1	1–0	1–3	1–1		1–1	1–0	0–2	1–3	1–3
Elgin City	5–0	3–0	4–1	0–3	2–0		3–1	1–6	2–0	1–1
Montrose	1–1	2–3	3–5	4–0	2–1	3–0		2–1	0–1	0–6
Peterhead	1–1	2–3	1–0	0–0	1–0	1–3	2–3		1–1	1–3
Queen's Park	1–3	0–0	1–1	3–0	2–0	6–0	3–1	1–1		2–0
Stranraer	2–3	4–2	2–1	0–0	6–0	1–0	4–4	2–1	2–3	

Updated to match(es) played on 6 March 2012. Source: BBC Sport
Legend: Blue = home team win; Yellow = draw; Red = away team win.

=== Second half of season ===
Home \ Away	ALO	ANN	BER	CLY	EST	ELG	MON	PET	QPA	STR
Alloa Athletic		1–1	0–1	1–0	5–1	8–1	2–0	3–1	4–0	3–1
Annan Athletic	1–2		1–1	1–0	2–2	1–1	1–2	0–3	2–3	1–3
Berwick Rangers	5–0	1–3		3–0	0–2	3–3	2–2	0–1	1–4	1–0
Clyde	1–1	1–1	2–2		3–0	0–2	1–2	0–1	1–2	2–1
East Stirlingshire	1–3	0–4	2–1	0–1		2–2	3–1	6–3	1–2	2–2
Elgin City	3–0	1–2	4–0	1–1	3–1		2–1	2–1	1–1	1–2
Montrose	0–2	1–1	1–1	5–0	3–1	2–3		1–3	3–1	1–3
Peterhead	0–1	3–2	1–2	1–1	2–0	3–0	2–1		2–1	1–1
Queen's Park	1–2	2–0	2–2	3–0	5–1	1–3	5–0	0–1		3–2
Stranraer	0–4	4–2	1–3	1–0	4–1	5–2	3–1	0–3	2–3	

Updated to match(es) played on 5 May 2012. Source: BBC Sport
Legend: Blue = home team win; Yellow = draw; Red = away team win.

== Statistics ==
=== Top goalscorers ===
Pos	Player	Club	Goals
1	(Australia) Martin Boyle	Montrose	22
2	(Scotland) Jamie Longworth	Queen's Park	20
2	(Scotland) Rory McAllister	Peterhead	20
4	(Scotland) Stevie May	Alloa Athletic	19
5	(Scotland) Craig Gunn	Elgin City	18
6	(Scotland) Craig Malcolm	Stranraer	15
7	(Scotland) Michael Moore	Stranraer	12
7	(Scotland) Stephen Stirling	Stranraer	12
9	(Scotland) Ryan McCord	Alloa Athletic	11
10	(Scotland) Michael Daly	Queen's Park	10
10	(Scotland) Darren Gribben	Berwick Rangers	10

=== Hat-tricks ===
Player	For	Against	Result	Date
(Scotland) Craig Gunn^{4}	Elgin City	Berwick Rangers	4–1	6 August 2011
(Scotland) Stevie May	Alloa Athletic	East Stirlingshire	3–1	2 January 2012
(Scotland) Jamie Longworth^{4}	Queen's Park	Elgin City	6–0	14 January 2012
(Scotland) Craig Gunn	Elgin City	Montrose	3–2	25 February 2012
(Scotland) Stevie May^{4}	Alloa Athletic	Elgin City	8–1	7 April 2012
(Scotland) Martin Boyle	Montrose	Clyde	5–0	5 May 2012

- ^{4} Player scored 4 goals

== Awards ==
Month	Third Division Manager of the Month		SFL Player of the Month		SFL Young player of the Month		Ginger Boot	
Month	Manager	Club	Player	Club	Player	Club	Player	Club
August	(Scotland) Harry Cairney	Annan Athletic	First division player		First division player		(Scotland) Craig Gunn	Elgin City
September	(Scotland) Paul Hartley	Alloa Athletic	First division player		Second division player		First division player	
October	(Scotland) Gardner Speirs	Queen's Park	First division player		First division player		Second division player	
November	(Scotland) Ian Little	Berwick Rangers	First division player		Second division player		(Scotland) Darren Gribben	Berwick Rangers
December	(Scotland) Keith Knox	Stranraer	First division player		(Scotland) Stephen Stirling	Stranraer	(Scotland) Stephen Stirling	Stranraer
January	(Scotland) Paul Hartley	Alloa Athletic	(Scotland) Stevie May	Alloa Athletic	(Scotland) Stevie May	Alloa Athletic	(Scotland) Stevie May	Alloa Athletic
February	(Scotland) Ross Jack	Elgin City	Second division player		First division player		Second division player	
March								
April								
