= 2007–08 in Scottish football =

Football in Scotland
- Season: 2007–08

2007–08 in Scottish football

Premier League champions
- Celtic

First Division champions
- Hamilton Academical

Second Division champions
- Ross County

Third Division champions
- East Fife

Scottish Cup winners
- Rangers

League Cup winners
- Rangers

Challenge Cup winners
- St Johnstone

Junior Cup winners
- Bathgate Thistle

Teams in Europe
- Aberdeen, Celtic, Dunfermline Athletic, Rangers

Scotland national team
- UEFA Euro 2008 qualifying

The 2007–08 season was the 111th season of competitive football in Scotland.

== Overview ==
- Gretna were competing in the Scottish Premier League for the first time, their first ever season in the top-flight, after being promoted as First Division champions the previous season.
- Dunfermline Athletic competed in the First Division after being relegated from the Scottish Premier League.
- Greenock Morton and Stirling Albion played in the First Division after being promoted as Second Division champions and First Division play-off winners, respectively.
- Ross County were competing in the Second Division after being relegated as the First Division's bottom team and Airdrie United were relegated through the Second Division play-offs.
- Berwick Rangers and Queen's Park were competing in the Second Division after being promoted from the Third Division as champions and Second Division play-offs winners, respectively.
- Forfar Athletic and Stranraer played Third Division football after being relegated as the Second Division's bottom team and Second Division play-off losers, respectively.
- East Stirlingshire had a suspended reduction to associate members hanging over them from the previous season. Finishing bottom of the Third Division would mean an automatic and instant reduction to associate members (and with it a potential expulsion from the league two years later at the end of the 2009–10 season), while finishing 9th or higher would annul any punishment.

== Notable events ==
=== 2007 ===
- 1 June – The Scottish Football Association appoint former Rangers and Kilmarnock striker Gordon Smith as the new Chief Executive following the departure of David Taylor who was appointed General Secretary of UEFA.
- 20 July – Irn-Bru became the new sponsor of the Scottish Football League, signing a three-year deal.
- 11 October – Celtic are fined £25,000 by UEFA for "lack of organisation and improper conduct by supporters" during their UEFA Champions League match with A.C. Milan at Celtic Park.
- 17 November – The Scotland national team fail to qualify for Euro 2008 after a 2–1 defeat by Italy at Hampden Park eliminated them at the qualifying stage.
- 25 November – St Johnstone beat Dunfermline 3–2 to win the Challenge Cup for the first time.
- 29 December – Motherwell captain Phil O'Donnell, 35, collapsed on the pitch at Fir Park during a match against Dundee United, and died later that evening.

=== 2008 ===
- 15 March – East Fife confirm their promotion to the Second Division as Third Division champions with a 3–0 victory over East Stirlingshire, becoming the first team in Britain to win a league trophy in the 2007–08 season.
- 16 March – Rangers win the Scottish League Cup by beating Dundee United 3–2 in a penalty shootout after a 2–2 draw in the final at Hampden Park.
- 22 March – Scotland's Under-17s qualify for the 2008 UEFA European Under-17 Football Championship after finishing top of their Elite qualifying group.
- 29 March – Gretna are relegated from the SPL after losing 2–0 to St Mirren at Love Street.
- 29 March – Berwick Rangers are relegated from the Second Division after a 2–2 draw with Peterhead.
- 5 April – Ross County win promotion to the First Division as Second Division champions after defeating already-relegated Berwick Rangers 4–0 and second place Airdrie United losing 2–1 to Brechin City.
- 8 April – Stirling Albion are relegated from the First Division after a 1–0 defeat to Partick Thistle.
- 12 April – First Division Queen of the South beat SPL Aberdeen 4–3 at Hampden Park to qualify for their first Scottish Cup final, in the highest scoring semi-final ever.
- 19 April – Hamilton Academical win promotion to the Scottish Premier League as First Division champions following a 2–0 over Clyde.
- 10 May – Clyde retain their First Division status after defeating Airdrie United 3–0 on aggregate in the First Division play-off final.
- 10 May – Arbroath are promoted to the Second Division after a 2–1 aggregate win over Stranraer in the Second Division play-off final. Cowdenbeath, who were beaten by Arbroath in the semi-finals, are relegated to the Third Division.
- 14 May – Rangers lose 2–0 to Zenit St. Petersburg in the UEFA Cup Final.
- 22 May – Celtic win their third successive SPL title after defeating Dundee United 1–0.
- 24 May – Rangers win the Scottish Cup for the 32nd time after defeating Queen of the South 3–2 in the Final. This was the Dumfries club's first ever Scottish Cup Final appearance in their history.
- 29 May – Gretna are demoted to the Third Division after administrator David Elliot could not guarantee the Football League that the club would fulfil its fixtures next season. Consequently, First Division play-off runners-up Airdrie United are promoted to the First Division and Second Division play-off runners-up Stranraer are promoted to the Second Division.

== Managerial changes ==
Team	Outgoing manager	Manner of departure	Date of vacancy	Replaced by	Date of appointment
Clyde	(Scotland) Joe Miller	Mutual Consent	25 May	(Scotland) Colin Hendry	11 June
Motherwell	(Scotland) Maurice Malpas	Resigned	1 June	(Scotland) Mark McGhee	18 June
Gretna	(Scotland) Rowan Alexander	Sacked	18 July	(Scotland) David Irons	18 July
Inverness CT	(Scotland) Charlie Christie	Resigned	20 August	(Scotland) Craig Brewster	27 August
Stenhousemuir	(Scotland) Campbell Money	Resigned	29 September	(Scotland) John Coughlin	12 October
Ross County	(Scotland) Dick Campbell	Mutual consent	2 October	(Scotland) Derek Adams	21 November
Berwick Rangers	(Scotland) John Coughlin	Resigned	7 October	(Scotland) Michael Renwick	24 October
Ayr United	(Scotland) Neil Watt	Resigned	23 October	(Scotland) Brian Reid	24 October
Dumbarton	(Scotland) Gerry McCabe	Sacked	11 November	(Scotland) Jim Chapman	31 December
St Johnstone	(Scotland) Owen Coyle	Mutual consent	22 November	(Scotland) Derek McInnes	27 November
Dunfermline Athletic	(Republic of Ireland) Stephen Kenny	Sacked	4 December	(Scotland) Jim McIntyre	3 January
Hibernian	(Scotland) John Collins	Resigned	20 December	(Finland) Mixu Paatelainen	10 January
Queen's Park	(Scotland) Billy Stark	Resigned	9 January	(Scotland) Gardner Speirs	25 January
Clyde	(Scotland) Colin Hendry	Resigned	18 January	(Scotland) John Brown	26 January
Greenock Morton	(Scotland) Jim McInally	Resigned	12 February	(Scotland) David Irons	19 February
Gretna	(Scotland) David Irons	Resigned	19 February	(England) Mick Wadsworth	19 February
East Stirlingshire	(Scotland) Gordon Wylde	Resigned	28 February	(Scotland) Jim McInally	13 March
Forfar Athletic	(Scotland) Jim Moffat	Mutual consent	21 April	(Scotland) Dick Campbell	8 May
Berwick Rangers	(Scotland) Michael Renwick	Sacked	28 February	(Scotland) Allan McGonigal	13 May
Heart of Midlothian	(Scotland) Stephen Frail	Mutual Consent	27 May 2008	(Hungary) Csaba László	11 July
Livingston	(England) Mark Proctor	Sacked	3 June	(Italy) Roberto Landi	11 June

== League competitions ==
=== Scottish Premier League ===
Celtic won their third consecutive title, having been off the pace for much of the season before a run of seven consecutive victories in the closing stages lifted them to the top of the table. Their title win was dedicated to the memory of assistant manager Tommy Burns, who died from cancer a week before the season ended. Rangers lost out on the title thanks to indifferent form in the final weeks of the campaign, though the fact that they came so close and recorded victories in both domestic cups nonetheless meant the season was a considerable improvement on the two previous seasons, which both ended up trophyless and without a serious challenge for the title. Motherwell finished third and took the UEFA Cup berth, as former player Mark McGhee's return as manager brought a major turnaround in form.

At the other end of the table, Gretna's meteoric rise up the Scottish football pyramid came to a juddering halt; they went bottom of the table following a 4-0 thrashing in their first match, and never left it. The withdrawal of millionaire owner Brooks Mileson plunged them into a financial crisis that forced the club into administration, resulting in them becoming the first top-flight club to earn a ten-point deduction for doing so. This helped cause them to set a new record for the lowest top-flight points total since the adoption of 3 points for a win, and their financial troubles would ultimately prove terminal, resulting in the club folding and being reformed as Gretna F.C. 2008 in the Lowland League for the following year.

Pos	Team	Pld	W	D	L	GF	GA	GD	Pts	Qualification or relegation (Note: Teams played each other three times (33 matches), before the league split into two groups (the top six and the bottom six) for the last five matches.)
1	Celtic (C)	38	28	5	5	84	26	+58	89	Qualification for the Champions League group stage
2	Rangers	38	27	5	6	84	33	+51	86	Qualification for the Champions League second qualifying round
3	Motherwell	38	18	6	14	50	46	+4	60	Qualification for the UEFA Cup first round
4	Aberdeen	38	15	8	15	50	58	−8	53	
5	Dundee United	38	14	10	14	53	47	+6	52	
6	Hibernian	38	14	10	14	49	45	+4	52	Qualification for the Intertoto Cup second round (Note: Hibernian qualified for the Intertoto Cup as the highest ranked club to apply for a place in the competition.)
7	Falkirk	38	13	10	15	45	49	−4	49	
8	Heart of Midlothian	38	13	9	16	47	55	−8	48	
9	Inverness Caledonian Thistle	38	13	4	21	51	62	−11	43	
10	St Mirren	38	10	11	17	26	54	−28	41	
11	Kilmarnock	38	10	10	18	39	52	−13	40	
12	Gretna (R)	38	5	8	25	32	83	−51	13 (Note: Gretna were deducted 10 points for entering administration.)	Resigned from the Scottish Football League and liquidated (Note: At the end of the season, Gretna were relegated to the Third Division due to their financial struggles. However, as no buyer was found for the club, they resigned from the Scottish Football League and were subsequently liquidated.)

Source: Scottish Professional Football League
Rules for classification: 1) Points; 2) Goal difference; 3) Goals scored
(C) Champions; (R) Relegated

=== Scottish First Division ===
Hamilton Academical won the title, and with it, their third promotion in seven years, bringing them back into the top-flight for the first time since 1989.

Stirling Albion finished well adrift in bottom place, and suffered automatic relegation as a result. Clyde were sent into the play-offs, and retained their place in the First Division by beating Airdrie United in the final.

Pos	Team	Pld	W	D	L	GF	GA	GD	Pts	Promotion, qualification or relegation
1	Hamilton Academical (C, P)	36	23	7	6	62	27	+35	76	Promotion to the Premier League
2	Dundee	36	20	9	7	58	30	+28	69	
3	St Johnstone	36	15	13	8	60	45	+15	58	
4	Queen of the South	36	14	10	12	47	43	+4	52	Qualification for the UEFA Cup second qualifying round (Note: Queen of the South qualified for the UEFA Cup Second Qualifying Round as Scottish Cup runners-up)
5	Dunfermline Athletic	36	13	12	11	36	41	−5	51	
6	Partick Thistle	36	11	12	13	40	39	+1	45	
7	Livingston	36	10	9	17	55	66	−11	39	
8	Greenock Morton	36	9	10	17	40	58	−18	37	
9	Clyde	36	9	10	17	40	59	−19	37	Qualification for the First Division Play-offs (Note: The 9th placed team were entered into a play-off with the Second Division's 2nd, 3rd and 4th placed teams. The winning team were awarded a place in the 2008–09 First Division, Clyde won the play-off to stay in the division.)
10	Stirling Albion (R)	36	4	12	20	41	71	−30	24	Relegation to the Second Division

Source: BBC Sport
Rules for classification: 1) points; 2) goal difference; 3) number of goals scored.
(C) Champions; (P) Promoted; (R) Relegated

=== Scottish Second Division ===
Ross County won immediate promotion back to the First Division, vindicating their shock decision to sack manager Dick Campbell early in the campaign with the club top of the table, as rookie manager Derek Adams managed to further improve the club's form, resulting in them comfortably winning the title. Airdrie United initially lost out on promotion after failing to beat Clyde in the play-offs, but Gretna's demise meant Airdrie ended up being promoted anyway.

Berwick Rangers were relegated in bottom place after a dismal campaign, and Cowdenbeath joined them after losing in the play-offs.

Pos	Team	Pld	W	D	L	GF	GA	GD	Pts	Promotion, qualification or relegation
1	Ross County (C, P)	36	22	7	7	78	44	+34	73	Promotion to the First Division
2	Airdrie United (P)	36	20	6	10	64	34	+30	66	Qualification for the First Division Play-offs (Note: The 2nd, 3rd and 4th placed teams will be entered into a play-off with the First Division's 9th placed team. The winning team were awarded a place in the 2008–09 First Division, Clyde won the play-off to stay in the division. However, with Gretna being relegated to the Third Division, Airdrie were promoted to Division One. Airdrie United won promotion to the First Division after Gretna were relegated to the Third Division.)
3	Raith Rovers	36	19	3	14	60	50	+10	60	Qualification for the First Division Play-offs
4	Alloa Athletic	36	16	8	12	57	56	+1	56	Qualification for the First Division Play-offs
5	Peterhead	36	16	7	13	65	54	+11	55	
6	Brechin City	36	13	13	10	63	48	+15	52	
7	Ayr United	36	13	7	16	51	62	−11	46	
8	Queen's Park	36	13	5	18	48	51	−3	44	
9	Cowdenbeath (R)	36	10	7	19	47	73	−26	37	Qualification for the Second Division Play-offs (Note: The 9th placed team were entered into a play-off with the Third Division's 2nd, 3rd and 4th placed teams. The winning team were awarded a place in the 2008–09 Second Division, Cowdenbeath were relegated and Arbroath were promoted. Due to Gretna's relegation, Stranraer were also promoted.)
10	Berwick Rangers (R)	36	3	7	26	40	101	−61	16	Relegation to the Third Division

Source: SPFL Archive
Rules for classification: 1) points; 2) goal difference; 3) number of goals scored.
(C) Champions; (P) Promoted; (R) Relegated

=== Scottish Third Division ===
East Fife won the division by a wide margin after their play-off heartbreak the previous season. Arbroath, who had likewise lost out on promotion in the previous season's play-offs, were victorious in this year's campaign. Stranraer, who lost to Arbroath in the play-off final, still ended up earning an immediate return to Division Two, thanks to Gretna's demise.

East Stirlingshire, who had been given a suspended reduction to associate members in the previous campaign (meaning they would have faced an expulsion vote had they finished bottom in both this and the next seasons), managed to avoid this fate by pulling above Forfar Athletic on the final day of the season. It was the first time since 2002 that any other team had finished bottom of the SFL pyramid.

Pos	Team	Pld	W	D	L	GF	GA	GD	Pts	Promotion or qualification
1	East Fife (C, P)	36	28	4	4	77	24	+53	88	Promotion to the Second Division
2	Stranraer (Note: Stranraer won promotion to Second Division after Gretna were relegated to the Third Division.) (P)	36	19	8	9	65	43	+22	65	Qualification for the Second Division Play-offs (Note: The 9th placed Second Division team were entered into a play-off with the Third Division's 2nd, 3rd and 4th placed teams. The winning team were awarded a place in the 2008–09 Second Division, Cowdenbeath were relegated and Arbroath were promoted. With Gretna being relegated to the Third Division, Stranraer were also promoted.)
3	Montrose	36	17	8	11	59	36	+23	59	Qualification for the Second Division Play-offs
4	Arbroath (P, O)	36	14	10	12	54	47	+7	52	Qualification for the Second Division Play-offs
5	Stenhousemuir	36	13	9	14	50	59	−9	48	
6	Elgin City	36	13	8	15	56	68	−12	47	
7	Albion Rovers	36	9	10	17	51	68	−17	37	
8	Dumbarton	36	9	10	17	31	48	−17	37	
9	East Stirlingshire (Note: Had East Stirlingshire finished bottom of the table for what would have been a sixth consecutive time, they would have lost their Scottish Football League status, they finished second bottom.)	36	10	4	22	48	71	−23	34	
10	Forfar Athletic	36	8	9	19	35	62	−27	33	

Source: SPFL archive
Rules for classification: 1) points; 2) goal difference; 3) number of goals scored.
(C) Champions; (O) Play-off winners; (P) Promoted

== Other honours ==
=== Main cup honours ===
Competition	Winner	score	Runner-up	Report
Scottish Cup 2007–08	Rangers	3–2	Queen of the South	Wikipedia article
League Cup 2007–08	Rangers	2 – 2 (a.e.t.) (3 – 2 pen.)	Dundee United	Wikipedia article
Challenge Cup 2007–08	St Johnstone	3–2	Dunfermline Athletic	Wikipedia article
Junior Cup	Bathgate Thistle	2–1	Cumnock Juniors	The Scotsman

=== Non-league honours ===
==== Senior ====
Competition	Winner
Highland League 2007–08	Cove Rangers
Highland League Cup	Inverurie Loco Works
East of Scotland Premier Division	Whitehill Welfare
East of Scotland First Division	Heriot-Watt University
East of Scotland King Cup	
East of Scotland League Cup	Spartans
South of Scotland League	Crichton
South of Scotland League Cup	St Cuthbert Wanderers
SFA North Challenge Cup	Huntly
SFA South Challenge Cup	Annan Athletic

==== Junior ====
West Region

Competition	Winner
Premier League	Pollok
Division One	Kirkintilloch Rob Roy
Ayrshire League	Hurlford United
Central League Division One	Port Glasgow
Central League Division Two	Vale of Leven

Competition	Winner
Evening Times Cup	Pollok
West of Scotland Cup	Kilbirnie Ladeside
Central League Cup	Arthurlie
Central Sectional League Cup	Rutherglen Glencairn
Ayrshire League Cup	Cumnock Juniors
Ayrshire Sectional League Cup	Auchinleck Talbot
North Ayrshire Cup	Ardrossan Winton Rovers
South Ayrshire Cup	Maybole

East Region

Competition	Winner
Super League	Lochee United
Premier League	Bo'ness United
North Division	Blairgowrie
Central Division	Ballingry Rovers
South Division	Fauldhouse United

North Region

Competition	Winner
Premier League	Banks O'Dee
Division One	Banchory St. Ternan
Division Two	Lossiemouth United

=== Individual honours ===
==== PFA Scotland awards ====
Award	Winner	Team
Players' Player of the Year	(Republic of Ireland) Aiden McGeady	Celtic
Young Player of the Year	(Republic of Ireland) Aiden McGeady	Celtic
Manager of the Year	(Scotland) Billy Reid	Hamilton Academical

==== SFWA awards ====
Award	Winner	Team
Footballer of the Year	(Spain) Carlos Cuéllar	Rangers
Young Player of the Year	(Scotland) Steven Fletcher	Hibernian
Manager of the Year	(Scotland) Walter Smith	Rangers
International Player of the Year	(Scotland) James McFadden	Everton/ Birmingham City

=== Monthly awards ===
Month	SPL				SFL				
Month	Manager	Player	Young player	Rising star	Div 1 manager	Div 2 manager	Div 3 manager	Player	Young player
August	(Scotland) Walter Smith (Rangers)	(Spain) Carlos Cuéllar (Rangers)	(Scotland) Steven Fletcher (Hibernian)	(Scotland) Mark Staunton (Falkirk)	(Scotland) Billy Reid (Hamilton Academical)	(Scotland) Billy Stark (Queen's Park)	(Scotland) Gordon Wylde (East Stirlingshire)	(England) Richard Offiong (Hamilton Academical)	(Scotland) Kevin McDonald (Dundee)
September	(Scotland) John Collins (Hibernian)	(Australia) Scott McDonald (Celtic)	(England) Andrew Driver (Heart of Midlothian)	(Scotland) Scott Anson (Kilmarnock)	(Scotland) Owen Coyle (St Johnstone)	(Scotland) Steve Paterson (Peterhead)	(Scotland) John McGlashan (Arbroath)	(Scotland) Ryan Stevenson (Ayr United)	(Scotland) James McArthur (Hamilton Academical)
October	(Scotland) Craig Levein (Dundee United)	(Scotland) Lee Wilkie (Dundee United)	(Scotland) Ross McCormack (Motherwell)	(Scotland) Jack Wilson (Hibernian)	(Scotland) Billy Reid (Hamilton Academical)	(Scotland) Alan Maitland (Alloa Athletic)	(England) David Baikie (East Fife)	(England) Bryn Halliwell (Hamilton Academical)	(Republic of Ireland) James McCarthy (Hamilton Academical)
November	(Scotland) Mark McGhee (Motherwell)	(Republic of Ireland) Aiden McGeady (Celtic)	(Scotland) Ross McCormack (Motherwell)	(Scotland) Liam Cusack (Gretna)	(Scotland) Alex Rae (Dundee)	(Scotland) Derek Adams (Ross County)	(England) David Baikie (East Fife)	(Scotland) Kenny Deuchar (St Johnstone)	(Scotland) Scott Fox (East Fife)
December	(Scotland) Craig Brewster (Inverness CT)	(Romania) Marius Niculae (Inverness CT)	(Scotland) Scott Arfield (Falkirk)	—	(Scotland) Jim McIntyre (Dunfermline Athletic)	(Scotland) Michael O'Neill (Brechin City)	(Scotland) Gerry Britton (Stranraer)	(Scotland) Allan Russell (Airdrie United)	(Scotland) Kevin McDonald (Dundee)
January	(Scotland) Walter Smith (Rangers)	(Scotland) Barry Robson (Dundee United)	(England) Danny Grainger (Dundee United)	—	(Scotland) Gordon Chisholm (Queen of the South)	(Scotland) Derek Adams (Ross County)	(England) David Baikie (East Fife)	(Scotland) Andrew Barrowman (Ross County)	(Republic of Ireland) Andy Jackson (St Johnstone)
February	(Finland) Mixu Paatelainen (Hibernian)	(Republic of Ireland) Aiden McGeady (Celtic)	(Scotland) Steven Fletcher (Hibernian)	(Scotland) Ryan Strachan (Aberdeen)	(Scotland) Gordon Chisholm (Queen of the South)	(Scotland) Neale Cooper (Peterhead)	(Scotland) Derek Ferguson (Stranraer)	(France) Mickaël Antoine-Curier (Dundee)	(Scotland) Graham Dorrans (Livingston)
March	(Scotland) Walter Smith (Rangers)	(Scotland) Darren Barr (Falkirk)	(Scotland) Garry Kenneth (Dundee United)	(Scotland) Ryan Crighton (St Mirren)	(Scotland) Ian McCall (Partick Thistle)	(Scotland) Brian Reid (Ayr United)	(Scotland) Robbie Williamson (Elgin City)	(Northern Ireland) Jonathan Tuffey (Partick Thistle)	(Scotland) Leigh Griffiths (Livingston)
April	(Scotland) Gordon Strachan (Celtic)	(Scotland) Barry Robson (Celtic)	(Scotland) Gary Glen (Heart of Midlothian)	—	(Scotland) Gordon Chisholm (Queen of the South)	(Scotland) Alan Maitland (Alloa Athletic)	(Scotland) Derek Ferguson (Stranraer)	(Scotland) Mark McLaughlin (Hamilton Academical)	(Scotland) Brian Easton (Hamilton Academical)

== Scottish clubs in Europe ==
=== Summary ===
Club	Competition(s)	Final round	Coef.
Celtic	UEFA Champions League	Round of 16	11.00
Rangers	UEFA Champions League UEFA Cup	Group stage Runners-up	23.50
Aberdeen	UEFA Cup	Round of 32	6.00
Dunfermline Athletic	UEFA Cup	Second qualifying round	0.50

=== Celtic ===
Date	Venue	Opponents	Score	Celtic scorer(s)	Report
Champions League third qualifying round
15 August	Luzhniki Stadium, Moscow (A)	(Russia) Spartak Moscow	1–1	Paul Hartley	BBC Sport
29 August	Celtic Park, Glasgow (H)	(Russia) Spartak Moscow	1–1 (a.e.t.) (4–3 Pen.)	Scott McDonald	BBC Sport
Champions League group stage
18 September	RSK Olimpiyskyi, Donetsk (A)	(Ukraine) Shakhtar Donetsk	0–2		BBC Sport
18 September	Celtic Park, Glasgow (H)	(Italy) A.C. Milan	2–1	Stephen McManus, Scott McDonald	BBC Sport
24 October	Estádio da Luz, Lisbon (A)	(Portugal) Benfica	0–1		BBC Sport
6 November	Celtic Park, Glasgow (H)	(Portugal) Benfica	1–0	Aiden McGeady	BBC Sport
28 November	Celtic Park, Glasgow (H)	(Ukraine) Shakhtar Donetsk	2–1	Jiří Jarošík, Massimo Donati	BBC Sport
4 December	San Siro, Milan (A)	(Italy) A.C. Milan	0–1		BBC Sport
Champions League Round of 16
20 February	Celtic Park, Glasgow (H)	(Spain) Barcelona	2–3	Jan Vennegoor of Hesselink, Barry Robson	BBC Sport
4 March	Nou Camp, Barcelona (A)	(Spain) Barcelona	0–1		BBC Sport

=== Rangers ===
Date	Venue	Opponents	Score	Rangers scorer(s)	Report
Champions League second qualifying round
31 July	Ibrox Stadium, Glasgow (H)	(Montenegro) FK Zeta	2–0	David Weir, Lee McCulloch	BBC Sport
7 August	Podgorica City Stadium, Podgorica (A)	(Montenegro) FK Zeta	1–0	DaMarcus Beasley	BBC Sport
Champions League third qualifying round
14 August	Ibrox Stadium, Glasgow (H)	(Serbia) Red Star Belgrade	1–0	Nacho Novo	BBC Sport
28 August	Stadion Crvena Zvezda, Belgrade (A)	(Serbia) Red Star Belgrade	0–0		BBC Sport
Champions League group stage
13 September	Ibrox Stadium, Glasgow (H)	(Germany) Stuttgart	2–1	Charlie Adam, Jean-Claude Darcheville	BBC Sport
19 September	Stade Gerland, Lyon (A)	(France) Lyon	3–0	Lee McCulloch, Daniel Cousin DaMarcus Beasley	BBC Sport
23 October	Ibrox Stadium, Glasgow (H)	(Spain) Barcelona	0–0		BBC Sport
7 November	Nou Camp, Barcelona (A)	(Spain) Barcelona	0–2		BBC Sport
27 November	Gottlieb-Daimler-Stadion, Stuttgart (A)	(Germany) Stuttgart	2–3	Charlie Adam, Barry Ferguson	BBC Sport
12 December	Ibrox Stadium, Glasgow (H)	(France) Lyon	0–3		BBC Sport
UEFA Cup Round of 32
13 February	Ibrox Stadium, Glasgow (H)	(Greece) Panathinaikos	0–0		BBC Sport
21 February	Leoforos Alexandras Stadium, Athens (A)	(Greece) Panathinaikos	(a)1–1	Nacho Novo	BBC Sport
UEFA Cup Round of 16
6 March	Ibrox Stadium, Glasgow (H)	(Germany) Werder Bremen	2–0	Daniel Cousin, Steven Davis	BBC Sport
13 March	Weserstadion, Bremen (A)	(Germany) Werder Bremen	0–1		BBC Sport
UEFA Cup Quarter-final
3 April	Ibrox Stadium, Glasgow (H)	(Portugal) Sporting CP	0–0		BBC Sport
10 April	Estádio José Alvalade, Lisbon (A)	(Portugal) Sporting CP	2–0	Jean-Claude Darcheville, Steven Whittaker	BBC Sport
UEFA Cup Semi-final
24 April	Ibrox Stadium, Glasgow (H)	(Italy) Fiorentina	0–0		BBC Sport
1 May	Stadio Artemio Franchi, Florence (A)	(Italy) Fiorentina	0–0 (a.e.t.) (4–2 pen.)		BBC Sport
UEFA Cup Final
14 May	City of Manchester Stadium, Manchester (N)	(Russia) Zenit St. Petersburg	0–2		BBC Sport

=== Aberdeen ===
Date	Venue	Opponents	Score	Aberdeen scorer(s)	Report
UEFA Cup first round
20 September	Pittodrie Stadium, Aberdeen (H)	(Ukraine) Dnipro	0–0		BBC Sport
4 October	Meteor Stadium, Dnipropetrovsk (A)	(Ukraine) Dnipro	(a)1–1	Darren Mackie	BBC Sport
UEFA Cup group stage
25 October	Leoforos Alexandras Stadium, Athens (A)	(Greece) Panathinaikos	0–3		BBC Sport
8 November	Pittodrie Stadium, Aberdeen (H)	(Russia) Lokomotiv Moscow	1–1	Zander Diamond	BBC Sport
29 November	Vicente Calderón Stadium, Madrid (A)	(Spain) Atlético Madrid	0–2		BBC Sport
20 December	Pittodrie Stadium, Aberdeen (H)	(Denmark) F.C. Copenhagen	4–0	Jamie Smith (2), Mikael Antonsson (o.g.), Richard Foster	BBC Sport
UEFA Cup Round of 32
13 February	Pittodrie Stadium, Aberdeen (H)	(Germany) Bayern Munich	2–2	Josh Walker, Sone Aluko	BBC Sport
21 February	Allianz Arena, Munich (A)	(Germany) Bayern Munich	1–5	Steve Lovell	BBC Sport

=== Dunfermline Athletic ===
Date	Venue	Opponents	Score	Dunfermline scorer(s)	Report
UEFA Cup second qualifying round
16 August	East End Park, Dunfermline (H)	(Sweden) BK Häcken	1–1	Jim Hamilton	BBC Sport
30 August	Rambergsvallen, Gothenburg (A)	(Sweden) BK Häcken	0–1		BBC Sport

== National teams ==
=== Summary ===
Scotland failed in their attempt to qualify for the Euro 2008, finishing third in Group B behind 2006 World Cup finalists France and Italy despite beating France twice. Scotland needed a win in their final group game against Italy to qualify, although a draw would have been enough if Ukraine beat France in the last group fixture. Scotland lost 2–1 as a result of a heavily criticised decision by Spanish referee Manuel Mejuto González to award Italy a free kick in stoppage time (resulting in a goal) when it was clear it should have been a free kick to Scotland.

Manager Alex McLeish resigned on 27 November 2007 following the loss against Italy and became manager of Birmingham City, his assistants Roy Aitken and Andy Watson joined him at Birmingham. He was eventually replaced on 24 January 2008 by Southampton manager George Burley, he appointed Steven Pressley and former England captain Terry Butcher as his assistants. In first match in charge a 1–1 draw was achieved against Croatia despite the withdrawal of 7 players.

=== Results ===
Date	Venue	Opponents	Score	Competition	Scotland scorer(s)	Report
22 August	Pittodrie Stadium, Aberdeen (H)	South Africa	1–0	Friendly	Kris Boyd	BBC Sport
8 September	Hampden Park, Glasgow (H)	Lithuania	3–1	ECQ(B)	Kris Boyd, Stephen McManus, James McFadden	BBC Sport
12 September	Parc des Princes, Paris (A)	France	1–0	ECQ(B)	James McFadden	BBC Sport
13 October	Hampden Park, Glasgow (H)	Ukraine	3–1	ECQ(B)	Kenny Miller, Lee McCulloch, James McFadden	BBC Sport
17 October	Boris Paichadze Stadium, Tbilisi (A)	Georgia	0–2	ECQ(B)		BBC Sport
17 November	Hampden Park, Glasgow (H)	Italy	1–2	ECQ(B)	Barry Ferguson	BBC Sport
26 March	Hampden Park, Glasgow (H)	Croatia	1–1	Friendly	Kenny Miller	BBC Sport
30 May	AXA Arena, Prague (A)	Czech Republic	1–3	Friendly	David Clarkson	BBC Sport

== Deaths ==
- 12 July: Forbes Johnston, 35, Falkirk and Airdrie midfielder.
- 31 August: Willie Cunningham, 77, St Mirren and Dunfermline defender; Dunfermline, Falkirk and St Mirren manager.
- 11 September: Ian Porterfield, 61, Aberdeen manager (1986–88).
- 30 November: Ian Crawford, 73, Hamilton and Hearts winger.
- 29 December: Phil O'Donnell, 35, Motherwell, Celtic and Scotland midfielder (died whilst playing for Motherwell).
- 14 January: Johnny Steele, 91, East Fife and Ayr United inside forward.
- 20 April: Derek McKay, 59, Dundee and Aberdeen winger.
- 15 May: Tommy Burns, 51, Celtic, Kilmarnock and Scotland midfielder; Kilmarnock and Celtic manager.
- 7 June: Jimmy Bonthrone, 78, East Fife, Dundee and Stirling Albion inside forward; East Fife and Aberdeen manager.
