= Pat Keogh =

Scottish footballer

Personal information
- Full name: Patrick Sebastian Keogh
- Date of birth: 7 May 1976 (age 50)
- Place of birth: Glasgow, Scotland
- Positions: Defender; forward

Youth career
- Maryhill

Senior career*
Years	Team	Apps	(Gls)
1998–2004	Clyde	178	(56)
2004–2006	Hamilton Academical	46	(9)
2006–2007	Partick Thistle	21	(3)
2007–2008	Stranraer	5	(1)
2008–2009	Forfar Athletic	2	(0)
- * Club domestic league appearances and goals as of 10:30, 16 March 2009 (UTC)

Patrick Sebastian Keogh (born 7 May 1976 in Glasgow) is a Scottish football player, whose most recent club was Scottish Third Division side Forfar Athletic.

== Career ==
Keogh originally played Junior football for Maryhill, and moved to Clyde with a batch of other Junior players in 1998. This move was successful; Clyde gained promotion to the Scottish First Division.

He was most successfully deployed as a forward at Clyde, where he scored some spectacular goals. Keogh spent six years at Broadwood and became a fan favourite. He scored a hat-trick in his last game for the club, in a 5–2 win against Brechin City.

After signing for Hamilton Academical (where he linked up with the management team who signed him for Clyde, Allan Maitland and Ronnie MacDonald) and then Partick Thistle, he made his way to Stranraer where he was named captain for the 2007-08 season.

After playing in only a handful of games for Stranraer, Keogh signed for Scottish Third Division side Forfar Athletic in June 2008, but after his appearances were limited by injuries he was released by the club in February 2009. Beith Juniors signed Keogh later that month, but injuries prevented him from ever playing for the club.

=== Coaching ===
After retirement, Keogh returned to Broadwood as a youth team coach in 2013.

He eventually returned to Maryhill Juniors as well, this time as a first team coach.

=== Personal life ===
Keogh grew up in the Maryhill area of Glasgow.

His grandfather Basil Keogh also played for Clyde in the 1950's, while the club played at Shawfield.

=== Honours ===
Clyde

- Scottish Second Division: 1999–2000
- Scottish First Division: Runner-up 2002–03, 2003–04

Hamilton

- Scottish Challenge Cup: Runners-up 2005–06
