= Stewart Henderson =

Stewart Henderson may refer to:

- Stewart Henderson (footballer, born 1947), Scottish football full back
- Stewart Henderson (footballer, born 1982), Scottish football midfielder
- Stewart Henderson (poet), British poet and broadcaster

== See also ==
- Stuart Henderson, Canadian filmmaker, historian, and culture critic
- Stuart Alexander Henderson, Scottish-born lawyer and political figure in British Columbia.
