= Robbie Williamson =

Scottish footballer

Personal information
- Full name: Robert Williamson
- Date of birth: 25 April 1969 (age 57)
- Place of birth: Inverness, Scotland
- Position: Midfielder

Senior career*
| Years | Team | Apps | (Gls) |
- Clachnacuddin
| 1989–1999 | Ross County | 81 | (9) |
- Clachnacuddin

Managerial career
- Clachnacuddin
- 2007–2008: Elgin City
- * Club domestic league appearances and goals

Robert Williamson (born 25 April 1969) is a Scottish former footballer, and former manager of Scottish League Third Division club Elgin City. Williamson played in midfield for Ross County for most of his professional career.

== Playing career ==
Williamson was born in Inverness and began his playing career with local Highland League club Clachnacuddin FC. As a youngster he joined Glasgow Rangers in 1988 under manager Graeme Souness at that time, only to return to Inverness due to homesickness.

He joined Ross County at the start of 1989, and was with the club when they were accepted into the Scottish Football League in 1994. Williamson spent five seasons playing for County in the Third Division, eventually winning the league title and promotion in his final year. A leg break ended his playing career, and he was awarded a testimonial by Ross County which saw Coventry City visit Victoria Park.

== Managerial career ==
Williamson's managerial career began at former club Clach, whom he led to the Highland League title in 2003–04 – their first championship since season 1974–75. In January 2007, Williamson became manager of Third Division side Elgin City, taking over at Borough Briggs following the departure of Brian Irvine.

In the 2007–08 season Williamson changed the fortunes of an Elgin side, who not long before, had been languishing at the bottom of the Third Division. Elgin narrowly missed out on a play-off place on the last day of the season.

Williamson was awarded with second place in the Scottish Third Division Manager of the Year awards, behind David Baikie of league champions East Fife.

Williamson quit Elgin City before their game with Berwick Rangers on 20 December 2008.
