= 1999–2000 Scottish Second Division =

Scottish Second Division
- Season: 1999–2000
- Champions: Clyde
- Promoted: Clyde; Alloa Athletic; Ross County
- Relegated: Hamilton Academical

The 1999–2000 Scottish Second Division was won by Clyde and ended with Alloa Athletic pipping Ross County to second place on the final day of the season thanks to a 6-1 win over Queen of the South, while Ross County could only manage a 2-2 draw away at Stenhousemuir. The top three were promoted as a result of league reconstruction. Hamilton Academical were relegated after they were docked 15 points for breaking league rules: with the players in dispute with the club management over unpaid wages, the team failed to fulfil a fixture against Stenhousemuir on 1 April 2000 at Ochilview Park.

== Table ==
| Pos | Team | Pld | W | D | L | GF | GA | GD | Pts | Promotion or relegation |
|---|---|---|---|---|---|---|---|---|---|---|
| 1 | Clyde (C, P) | 36 | 18 | 11 | 7 | 65 | 37 | +28 | 65 | Promotion to the First Division |
| 2 | Alloa Athletic (P) | 36 | 17 | 13 | 6 | 58 | 38 | +20 | 64 | Promotion to the First Division |
| 3 | Ross County (P) | 36 | 18 | 8 | 10 | 57 | 39 | +18 | 62 | Promotion to the First Division |
| 4 | Arbroath | 36 | 11 | 14 | 11 | 52 | 55 | −3 | 47 | |
| 5 | Partick Thistle | 36 | 12 | 10 | 14 | 42 | 44 | −2 | 46 | |
| 6 | Stranraer | 36 | 9 | 18 | 9 | 47 | 46 | +1 | 45 | |
| 7 | Stirling Albion | 36 | 11 | 7 | 18 | 60 | 72 | −12 | 40 | |
| 8 | Stenhousemuir | 36 | 10 | 8 | 18 | 44 | 59 | −15 | 38 | |
| 9 | Queen of the South | 36 | 8 | 9 | 19 | 45 | 75 | −30 | 33 | |
| 10 | Hamilton Academical (R) | 36 | 10 | 14 | 12 | 39 | 44 | −5 | 29 (Note: 15 points deducted) | Relegation to the Third Division |

Source: SPFL Archive
Rules for classification: 1) points; 2) goal difference; 3) number of goals scored.
(C) Champions; (P) Promoted; (R) Relegated

== Top scorers ==
| Scorer | Team | Goals |
|---|---|---|
| (Scotland) Brian Carrigan | Clyde | 19 |
| (Scotland) Ally Graham | Stirling Albion | 17 |
| (Scotland) Martin Cameron | Alloa Athletic | 16 |
| (Scotland) Colin McGlashan | Arbroath | 15 |
| (Scotland) John McQuade | Stirling Albion | 15 |
| (Scotland) Willie Irvine | Alloa Athletic | 13 |
| (Scotland) Stevie Mallan | Queen of the South | 13 |
| (Scotland) George Shaw | Ross County | 13 |
| (Scotland) Pat Keogh | Clyde | 11 |
| (Scotland) Paul McGrillen | Stirling Albion | 11 |

== Attendance ==
The average attendance for Division Two clubs for season 1999/00 are shown below:

| Club | Average |
|---|---|
| Ross County | 2,293 |
| Partick Thistle | 2,278 |
| Queen of the South | 1,153 |
| Clyde | 1,151 |
| Stirling Albion | 866 |
| Alloa Athletic | 825 |
| Arbroath | 809 |
| Hamilton Academical | 696 |
| Stenhousemuir | 685 |
| Stranraer | 469 |
