= Brian Carrigan =

Scottish footballer (born 1979)

Personal information
- Full name: Brian Eric Carrigan
- Date of birth: 26 September 1979 (age 47)
- Place of birth: Glasgow, Scotland
- Position: Striker

Youth career
- ????–1996: Kilsyth Rangers

Senior career*
Years	Team	Apps	(Gls)
1996–2000	Clyde	100	(26)
2000–2001	Stockport County	13	(1)
2001–2002	Clydebank	10	(0)
2002	→ Clyde (loan)	9	(4)
2002–2003	Raith Rovers	21	(4)
2003–2006	Hamilton Academical	85	(26)
2006–2008	Linlithgow Rose		
2008	Hamilton Academical	0	(0)
2008–2009	Linlithgow Rose		
2009	→ Alloa Athletic (loan)	9	(2)
2009–2010	Alloa Athletic	13	(4)
2010	Bo'ness United		
2010–2011	Glenafton Athletic	1*	(1*)
2013	Kilsyth Rangers		
2013	Sauchie Juniors		

International career
2000	Scotland U21	1	(0)
- * Club domestic league appearances and goals as of 15:00, 26 July 2013 (UTC)

Brian Eric Carrigan (born 26 September 1979) is a Scottish footballer who most recently played for Sauchie Juniors in the Scottish Junior Football Association, East Region. He previously played in both the Scottish and English football leagues.

== Career ==
Originally signed by Alex Smith on a YTS scheme for Clyde in 1993, Carrigan moved up to the first team as a 16 year-old in 1996. Carrigan scored 18 goals in 31 league games when Clyde won the Second Division title in 1999–2000. He was also voted SPFA Second Division Player of the Year.

He earned a move to England with Stockport County that summer for a six figure transfer fee, but was sacked by the club in June 2001, after he was banned from driving for two and a half years for drink driving.

After a trial period with Dundee United, he joined Clydebank in September 2001. In January 2002 he went out on loan back to Clyde, but this was terminated in March due to his recurring drink problems, although the player himself disputed those claims.

After a successful trial, Carrigan signed for Raith Rovers in July 2002. He then joined Hamilton Academical in May 2003, but was allowed to leave for junior side Linlithgow Rose in the summer of 2006. During season 2006–07, the Rose won the Scottish Junior Cup with Carrigan scoring in the final and clinched the East Region title on the final day with Carrigan netting a hat-trick.

He re-joined Hamilton Accies again on 7 August 2008. However, Carrigan left Hamilton in November of the same year, having never made an appearance for the club. He then returned to Linlithgow. Carrigan's second spell at Linlithgow was a short one and he joined Alloa Athletic in January 2009 on loan until the end of the season. In the summer of 2009 he signed a permanent contract with Alloa. In January 2010 Carrigan was placed on the transfer list by Alloa and that August moved back to junior ranks with Bo'ness United.

On 26 September 2010 Carrigan joined Glenafton Athletic, where he scored on his début. After being released by Glens, Carrigan went on trial with Ashfield but did not sign for the club. After an eighteen-month hiatus from the game, Carrigan joined Kilsyth Rangers in March 2013 before signing for Sauchie Juniors in the close season.

On 25 September 2013, Carrigan ended his short stay at Sauchie Juniors after just a month, ending his club career.

== International career ==
Carrigan represented Scotland at under-16, under-18, and under-21 youth levels. His solitary under-21 appearance was a friendly with the Netherlands in 2000.

He was called up for the Scotland Junior team for the opening match of the Quadrangular Tournament in 2007–08.

== Honours ==
Clyde

- Scottish Second Division: 1999–2000

Raith Rovers

- Scottish Second Division: 2002–03

Hamilton Academical

- Scottish Second Division: Promotion 2003–04

Linlithgow Rose

- Scottish Junior Cup: 2006–07
- East Region Super League: 2006–07
- East Region League Cup: 2006–07, 2007–08

Individual

- SPFA Second Division Player of the Year: 1999–2000
- SFL Young Player of the Year: 1999–2000
