= Dennis Newall =

Scottish football manager

Dennis Newall is the former manager of East Stirlingshire who play association football in the Scottish Third Division.

When he was named as successor to Stevie Morrison in March 2004, Newall became the first unpaid manager in senior football.

He also managed Scottish junior sides Cumbernauld United and Lesmahagow, and coached at senior side Albion Rovers.

Newall was sacked by East Stirlingshire in late 2005, and was replaced by his former assistant Gordon Wylde in early 2006.
