= John Coughlin (footballer) =

Football player and manager (born 1963)

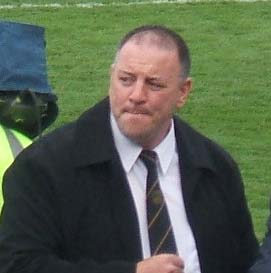
- Coughlin at Berwick Rangers

Personal information
- Date of birth: 11 April 1963 (age 63)
- Place of birth: New York City, United States
- Position: Right-back

Youth career
- Newtongrange Star

Senior career*
Years	Team	Apps	(Gls)
1991–1993	Meadowbank Thistle	68	(3)
1993–1996	Berwick Rangers	14	(1)
1997–1998	Alloa Athletic	0	(0)
Total		82	(4)

Managerial career
- 2002–2003: St Mirren
- 2003–2004: Drexel Dragons
- 2005–2007: Berwick Rangers
- 2007–2010: Stenhousemuir
- 2011–2014: East Stirlingshire
- 2015–2017: Berwick Rangers
- 2018: Selkirk
- * Club domestic league appearances and goals

John Coughlin (born 11 April 1963) is a Scottish football player and manager.

A right-back, he played for Meadowbank Thistle and Berwick Rangers until injury forced him out of the game. He is a SJFA capped player from his time at Newtongrange Star.

Following his playing career, Coughlin began a career in management with St Mirren.

== Playing career ==
Coughlin started out his playing career in junior football where he is a SJFA capped player from his time at Newtongrange Star.

He signed for the club Meadowbank Thistle in 1991 where he played until 1993, before moving to Berwick Rangers until injury forced him out of the game. Coughlin was assistant manager to Tom Hendrie at Berwick Rangers, helping the club win promotion in 1994. He left Berwick Rangers in 1996 and joined Alloa Athletic along with Hendrie where they also lead Alloa to promotion in 1998.

== Managerial career ==
=== St Mirren ===
In 1998 Coughlin joined St Mirren and helped lead them to the championship in 2000. He was appointed St Mirren manager in December 2002, but results faltered and he stood down the following November.

=== Drexel Dragons men's soccer ===
In 2003, following his dismissal from St Mirren, Coughlin moved to the United States to take up a coaching position with the men's soccer team at Drexel University in Philadelphia. Under his management, the Dragons finished a disappointing 8 out of 12 teams in the regular season. Despite this, attendances were high relative to the norm in the region's second tier, the CAA Men's Soccer Tournament, with some at the university attributing this to his self-proclaimed "Heavy Entertainment" style of football. Coughlin has used this frequently since: it involves a high-tempo, direct style of play with tall, strong players deployed, all of whom are well-organised into a rigid and balanced shape. The team became renowned for converting a high amount of its goal shots from set plays.

Coughlin resigned from his coaching role with Drexel once the regular season ended, and returned to Scotland in 2004.

=== Berwick Rangers ===
Coughlin became Berwick Rangers manager in May 2005. He won the Manager of the Month prize for August 2005 and September 2005. They had a great run with a new club record of eight consecutive game wins. John was awarded Manager of the Month for the months of December 2006 and January 2007. Berwick would win the 2006–07 Scottish Third Division championship, last won in 1979. It was Coughlin's third league title but the first in his own right. However, following a poor start to the 2007–08 season, Coughlin resigned as manager.

=== Stenhousemuir ===
In 2007, Coughlin then became manager of Stenhousemuir. He guided the club to promotion into the Second Division via the Second Division play-offs, beating Queen's Park in the 2-legged semi-final and then Cowdenbeath in the 2-legged final in May 2009. Coughlin resigned in December 2010 after a 6–0 defeat against East Fife.

=== East Stirlingshire ===
East Stirlingshire appointed Coughlin as head coach on 30 May 2011. His first two seasons in charge saw the struggling club finish bottom of the Scottish Football League. The team improved during the 2013–14 season, but Coughlin declined the offer of a new contract.

=== Return to Berwick Rangers ===
After Colin Cameron was sacked in October 2015, Coughlin returned to Berwick Rangers, beginning his second spell in charge of the side in November 2015. He left Berwick in August 2017, after a 5–1 defeat against Annan Athletic.

=== Selkirk F.C. ===
Coughlin was appointed manager of Scottish Lowland League side Selkirk, on 14 February 2018 following the departure of Ian Fergus. Coughlin cited the opportunity to work with his nephew, a player at the club, as a key reason for joining. However, he would resign after only four games in charge.
