= Allan Maitland =

Scottish football manager

Team information
- Current team: Clyde (Club Chairman)

Managerial career
- Years: Team
- 1998–2002: Clyde
- 2003–2005: Hamilton Academical
- 2006–2011: Alloa Athletic

Allan Maitland is a Scottish football manager and administrator who is currently chairman at Scottish League Two club Clyde.

== Career ==
=== Maryhill ===
Maitland was assistant to Ronnie MacDonald at Maryhill Juniors. Together they won three consecutive Evening Times Cup Winners' Cups. The trophy was retained from 1995 to 1998. The duo also won the Central Junior League twice. They won back-to-back titles in 1997 and 1998.

=== Clyde ===
With no professional playing experience and having been assistant to Ronnie MacDonald at Junior club Maryhill Juniors, Maitland became the manager of Clyde in 1998, after his long-time mentor MacDonald took over as general manager. After a season working alongside MacDonald – who brought in a large contingent of players from the Juniors such as Pat Keogh and Scott McHarg – he guided Clyde to the Scottish Second Division title in his first season in sole charge, winning promotion to the Scottish First Division. He left Clyde in February 2002 along with MacDonald and other associates after a dispute over youth funding.

=== Hamilton Academical ===
Maitland was then appointed manager of Hamilton in 2003, a short time after Ronnie MacDonald became the club's owner.

When he took over the reins at New Douglas Park, the Accies had narrowly avoided relegation to the Scottish Third Division. Maitland managed to turn the team around and gained promotion to the Scottish First Division in his first season in charge finishing second behind Airdrie United. Hamilton finished a respectable seventh in the first season on the Scottish First Division but Maitland and Hamilton parted ways after the 2004–05 season.

=== Alloa Athletic ===
Maitland was appointed successor to Tom Hendrie as Alloa Athletic manager on 9 January 2006, with Alloa sitting eight points adrift at the bottom of the Scottish Second Division. Maitland's first game in charge of Alloa was not an easy game, a midweek Scottish Cup third round replay away to SPL opposition, Livingston. Alloa fell behind to a Paul Dalglish penalty before half time but rallied in the second half with great goals from Robert Sloan and Ross Hamilton to win 2–1. Maitland then needed to turn this kind of gritty performance to the league to save Alloa from relegation. He managed to steer the club to a ninth-place finish meaning entry into the playoffs to decide relegation from/promotion to the Scottish Second Division. Alloa met Arbroath in the semi-final where they won through 2–1 on aggregate. This meant a play-off final showdown with Berwick Rangers. Alloa basically put the tie out of Berwick's reach with a 4–0 home win in the first leg; the 2–1 Berwick win in the return fixture ensured Alloa's Second Division future.

In Maitland's first full season in charge at Alloa, the club finished in seventh place which was followed by a clear out of 10 players with Allan quoted as saying "I want this club to be looking up the way and looking to challenge at the right end of the division next season, to do that there needs to be radical surgery and by releasing these players tonight it creates space for other players to come in..." Maitland started to build his squad for the 2007–2008 season with the addition of nine new players including experienced defender Derek Fleming and second time Alloa midfielder Brown Ferguson.

Maitland was sacked in May 2011 following the club's failure to avoid the relegation playoffs.

=== Return to Hamilton ===
He later returned to Hamilton Academical (still run by Ronnie MacDonald and associates) to a role as the Director of youth football overseeing their youth system, during which time the club's under-17 team qualified for the UEFA Youth League in 2018. He became the chairman of Hamilton Academical in December 2018 when MacDonald stepped down from the role, and soon appointed Allan McGonigal as director of football and Brian Rice as head coach of the club, the latter replacing Martin Canning who had held the more traditional manager role.

=== Return to Clyde ===
Two decades after his departure as manager, Maitland returned to the club as Director of Football. In June 2024 he succeeded Gordon Thomson as chairman.

== Honours ==
Clyde

- Scottish Second Division champions 1999–2000

Hamilton Academical

- Scottish Second Division promotion 2003–04
