= Stewart Henderson (footballer, born 1982) =

Scottish footballer

Personal information
- Date of birth: 13 January 1982 (age 44)
- Place of birth: Aberdeen, Scotland
- Position: Midfielder

Senior career*
Years	Team	Apps	(Gls)
1998–2001	Forfar Athletic		
1999–2000	→ Rothes (loan)		
2000–2001	→ Longside (loan)		
2001–2003	Brechin City		
- * Club domestic league appearances and goals

Stewart Henderson (born 13 January 1982) is a Scottish former professional footballer, who played as a midfielder for Forfar Athletic, Rothes F.C. and Brechin City.
