= Gordon Wylde =

Scottish footballer and manager

Personal information
- Full name: Gordon Wylde
- Date of birth: 12 November 1964 (age 61)
- Place of birth: Glasgow, Scotland
- Position: Midfielder

Team information
- Current team: Broomhill (assistant manager)

Youth career
- Drumchapel Amateurs

Senior career*
Years	Team	Apps	(Gls)
1983–1988	East Stirlingshire	124	(5)
1988–1991	Kilmarnock	59	(1)
1991	Queen of the South	6	(0)
1991–1995	Clyde	69	(1)
Total		258	(7)

Managerial career
- 2006–2008: East Stirlingshire
- 2023-2024: Camelon Juniors
- * Club domestic league appearances and goals

Gordon Wylde (born 12 November 1964) is a Scottish former association football player and manager. He is currently the assistant manager of Broomhill in the Lowland League.

He played for East Stirlingshire, Kilmarnock, Queen of the South and Clyde, and managed East Stirlingshire from 2006 to 2008.

== Playing career ==
Wylde began his senior career at the Shire, before joining Kilmarnock in 1988. He then had a brief spell at Queen of the South, before joining Clyde.

== Managerial career ==
Wylde was appointed assistant coach to the reserve team during his time at Broadwood Stadium, and was promoted to assistant manager of the first team when Gardner Spiers was appointed manager. He left the club after Spiers was sacked.

He was assistant manager at East Stirlingshire to Dennis Newell from March 2004 to December 2005. When Newall was sacked, Wylde became his replacement in early 2006. The Shire saw considerable improvement under Wylde's tenure, even though he failed to prevent them finishing bottom of the Scottish Third Division. However season 2007–08 saw the club exceed expectations. He won the division's Manager of the Month award in August 2007.

Wylde led the club to the Scottish Cup third round, where they faced Scottish Premier League title challengers Rangers at Ibrox Stadium. The Shire lost 6–0. He resigned from his position at East Stirlingshire after a run of poor results on 28 February 2008. His reason for resigning was health issues due to the stress of attempting to keep the club from finishing bottom of the Third Division for a fifth season in succession. This would have potentially resulted in the club losing their league status, and he cited the unrealistic expectations of the fans having a bearing on his decision.

Wylde returned to Clyde in January 2010, as under-19 coach, and was promoted to assistant head coach in April 2010.

== Personal life ==
Wylde's son, Gregg, played for Rangers.
