= Keith Knox =

Scottish footballer and manager

Personal information
- Full name: Keith Knox
- Date of birth: 6 August 1964 (age 62)
- Place of birth: Stranraer, Scotland
- Positions: Defender; midfielder

Team information
- Current team: Creetown

Senior career*
Years	Team	Apps	(Gls)
1982–1987	Stranraer	173	(16)
1987–1997	Clyde	322	(17)
1997–2001	Stranraer	128	(11)
2001–2003	Alloa Athletic	37	(5)
2003–2004	Gretna	16	(1)
2004–2005	Stenhousemuir	39	(1)
2005–2007	Wigtown & Bladnoch		
Total		715	(51)

Managerial career
- 2005–2007: Wigtown & Bladnoch
- 2009–2012: Stranraer
- 2012–2012: Threave Rovers
- 2016 –: Creetown F.C.
- * Club domestic league appearances and goals

Keith Knox (born 6 August 1964 in Stranraer) is a Scottish former football player and was the manager of Creetown F.C. until his resignation in September 2017.

== Playing career ==
Knox started his career with his hometown team, before moving to Clyde in 1987. Knox was a part-time player, combining his football career with his duties as a postman. This led to him being given the nickname "The Postie". Knox regularly did his shift as a postman in Stranraer, before travelling to Cumbernauld for Clyde training. This dedication for 10 years made him a firm favourite amongst the Clyde fans. He was the club captain for the latter years, and was awarded a testimonial against Rangers in 1997. Knox also played in the first ever game at Broadwood Stadium in 1994.

After 10 years good service, Knox left Clyde and returned to his first club and hometown team, Stranraer. He stayed there for 4 years, before moving to Alloa Athletic. He had spells at Gretna and Stenhousemuir, before dropping out of the Scottish Football League, to take up a player-manager role at Wigtown & Bladnoch.

== Management and coaching ==
Knox rejoined Stranraer in July 2007, in the position of Reserve Team manager. After Derek Ferguson left the club, Knox was appointed as caretaker manager in January 2009. He was given the job on a permanent basis in February 2009. Stranraer sacked Knox in October 2012, citing poor results early in the 2012–13 season. On 14 November 2012 Knox was appointed manager of South of Scotland League side Threave Rovers. In October 2016 Knox returned to Football as manager of South of Scotland side Creetown F.C. He resigned from Creetown F.C. in September 2017.

== See also ==
- List of footballers in Scotland by number of league appearances (500+)
