= Harry Cairney =

Scottish footballer and manager

Personal information
- Date of birth: 1 September 1961 (age 65)
- Place of birth: Holytown, Scotland
- Position: Defender

Youth career
- Fir Park Boys Club

Senior career*
Years	Team	Apps	(Gls)
1980–1983	Airdrieonians	49	(0)
1983–1992	Stenhousemuir	306	(15)
1992–2003	Brechin City	355	(3)
Total		710	(18)

Managerial career
- 2003–2004: Annan Athletic
- 2004–2005: Arbroath
- 2006–2012: Annan Athletic
- * Club domestic league appearances and goals

Henry "Harry" Cairney (born 1 September 1961) is a Scottish former football player and manager. He made over 700 appearances in the Scottish Football League for Airdrieonians, Stenhousemuir and Brechin City. Cairney has also managed Annan Athletic and Arbroath.

== Career ==
Cairney was born in Holytown and began his senior career with Airdrieonians, making his senior debut in a match against Rangers at Ibrox. He then played for Stenhousemuir, where he made over 300 league appearances. In 1992, he joined Brechin City, where he stayed for 11 years and made over 350 appearances. He retired in 2003 and was appointed as manager of East of Scotland League side Annan Athletic.

Cairney moved to Arbroath in September 2004, but resigned just over a year later. Cairney subsequently rejoined Annan, and was manager at the time of their election to the Scottish League in July 2008. He won the Scottish Football League award for Third Division manager after his first month in the league. Cairney resigned his position as Annan manager in December 2012, citing family and health reasons.

Cairney also teaches Physics and Chemistry at Mearns Castle High School in Newton Mearns.

=== Managerial statistics ===
As of 20 December 2012

Team	Nat	From	To	Record				
Team	Nat	From	To	G	W	D	L	Win %
Annan Athletic	(Scotland)	2003	2004					
Arbroath	(Scotland)	July 2004	September 2005	50	12	11	27	24.00
Annan Athletic	(Scotland)	August 2005	December 2012	203	71	57	75	34.98

== See also ==
- List of footballers in Scotland by number of league appearances (500+)
