= David Baikie =

Scottish football manager (born 1953)

Dave Baikie
Personal information
- Date of birth: 11 August 1953 (age 73)
- Place of birth: Scotland

Managerial career
- Years: Team
- 1997–2000: Arbroath
- Tayport
- 2004–2005: Cowdenbeath
- 2006–2009: East Fife
- 2009–2011: Linlithgow Rose

David Baikie (born 11 August 1953) is a Scottish former football manager.

== Career ==
=== Arbroath ===
His began management in the Scottish Football League with Arbroath F.C. in 1997. He led the club from bottom of the Third Division to promotion, before resigning over a lack of funding in 2000.

=== Tayport ===
Baikie returned to the junior ranks to manage Tayport.

=== Cowdenbeath ===
Baikie returned to the Scottish Football League in 2004 as manager of Cowdenbeath. He lost his job the following year, however, when he was charged with an assault outside a bar in Dundee.

=== East Fife ===
Baikie was appointed manager of East Fife in 2006 during a turbulent period in the club's history. Despite this led the side to the Scottish Third Division championship the next season. The club stabilised under his leadership and Baikie won a manager of the month award during the 2008–09 season. However, in April 2009 the club announced the resignation of Baikie as manager.

=== Linlithgow Rose ===
Baikie subsequently took charge of Scottish Junior Football East Region Super League club Linlithgow Rose and led them to their 2010 Scottish Junior Cup final victory.

Linlithgow Rose sacked boss David Baikie after they lost to Bonnyrigg. Baikie, who only 18 months ago led the club to Scottish Cup glory, was forced out the door with assistants Graeme Irons and Derek Carr.

== Honours ==
Arbroath

- Scottish Third Division: promotion 1997–98

East Fife

- Fife Cup: 2007–08
- Scottish Third Division: 2007–08

Linlithgow Rose

- Scottish Junior Cup: 2009–10
