= Neil Watt =

Scottish footballer and manager

Personal information
- Full name: Neil James Watt
- Date of birth: 16 September 1962 (age 64)
- Place of birth: Hanover, West Germany
- Height: 6 ft 1 in (1.85 m)
- Positions: Forward; defender

Youth career
- 1979–1980: Celtic

Senior career*
Years	Team	Apps	(Gls)
1980–1982	Forfar Athletic	53	(16)
1982–1983	East Stirlingshire	38	(5)
1983–1986	Stirling Albion	85	(17)
1986–1990	Stranraer	128	(18)
Total		304	(41)

Managerial career
- 1998-2003: Maryhill
- 2003-2006: Stranraer
- 2006-2008: Ayr United
- 2009-2013: Clyde (Director of Football)
- * Club domestic league appearances and goals

Neil James Watt (born 16 September 1962) is a Scottish football player and manager.

== Club career ==
Watt is a former professional football player and manager. He played first team football for Forfar Athletic, East Stirlingshire, Stirling Albion, Stranraer. He then played for and managed a number of Scottish football clubs, before returning to the senior game as manager of Stranraer in 2003.

Watt requested his contract be terminated at Celtic citing a wish to play regular first team football and went on to make over 300 senior appearances in the Scottish Football League. He then went on to play for a number of Scottish junior clubs, most successfully Maryhill where he later became manager, before returning to the game as manager of Stranraer, Ayr United and Clyde.

Watt scored on his senior debut aged 17 and continued to play professional football on a part time basis for 10 years while forging a business career in property. He then moved to Junior football having further success winning various leagues and cups along the way. He played and scored in British football's highest scoring game in over 120 years, Stirling Albion v Selkirk - Scottish Cup 2nd round 1986.

== Managerial career ==
After retiring as a player, Watt returned to senior football in 2003, along with assistant manager Stuart Millar, enjoyed immediate success rebuilding a relegated Stranraer team and leading them to the 2003–04 Scottish Third Division championship. He then guided them to a second successive promotion, as runners-up in the 2004–05 Scottish Second Division. Watt had discussions with various full-time clubs, most notably Dundee but he turned down several opportunities due to his other business interest. Watt left Stranraer at the end of season 2005–06, when the club was relegated back to the Second Division. Watt was keen to promote young talent and gave opportunities to various players who moved onto full-time clubs. He left Stranraer in 2006 when the part-time club was relegated from the Championship, losing a play-off final with Partick Thistle F.C.

After a short period out of football, Watt was appointed manager of Ayr United. He resigned from that post in October 2007, for reasons that were not explained. In his time there he helped the club secure their First Division status.

Watt was recognised by the Scottish football in 2003/04 and 2004/05 as their Divisional Manager of the Year. He was named Manager of the Month on several occasions.

== Achievements ==
SFL Manager of the Month - 9 occasions

SFL Manager of the Year - 2003/2004 and 2004/2005

3rd Division Championship - 2003/2004

2nd Division promoted - 2004/2005

Watt continued to have a periphery involvement in professional football, advising and mentoring at different levels.

In 2009 Watt was appointed to the Board of Clyde, as Director of Football. At the time Clyde had severe financial problems, famously referred to by Sir Alex Ferguson as a "basket case". Watt saw this as a challenge to rescue a famous club in decline and after 4 successful years on the board, he resigned with the club on a more stable footing. During that time, he twice took temporary charge of the first team as its caretaker manager.

Watt has built a successful business career in residential property management. He has served on a variety of professional groups offering his advice and support on many industry matters. Scottish Government has sought his advice on related matters as an acknowledged expert in his field.

He has owned various racehorses in partnership with long-time friend David Moyes, current manager of Everton FC.
