= Jim McInally =

Scottish footballer and manager

Personal information
- Full name: James Edward McInally
- Date of birth: 19 February 1964 (age 62)
- Place of birth: Glasgow, Scotland
- Height: 5 ft 7 in (1.70 m)
- Positions: Left-back; midfielder

Senior career*
Years	Team	Apps	(Gls)
1983–1984	Celtic	1	(0)
1984	→ Dundee (loan)	11	(2)
1984–1986	Nottingham Forest	36	(0)
1986	Coventry City	5	(0)
1986–1995	Dundee United	284	(12)
1995–1996	Raith Rovers	29	(0)
1996–1997	Dundee United	16	(1)
1997–1999	Dundee	48	(1)
1999	Sligo Rovers	13	(0)
Total		443	(16)

International career
1987–1993	Scotland	10	(0)
1990	Scottish League XI	1	(0)

Managerial career
- 1999: Sligo Rovers
- 2004–2008: Greenock Morton
- 2008–2011: East Stirlingshire
- 2011–2022: Peterhead
Medal record
Scotland
UEFA European U-18 Championship
Winner	1982 Finland	Team competition
- * Club domestic league appearances and goals

James Edward McInally (born 19 February 1964) is a Scottish football manager and former player, who was most recently the manager of Scottish League Two club Peterhead. He played for Dundee United for 10 seasons in which he won the 1993–94 Scottish Cup and played in the 1987 UEFA Cup Final. At United he was also a three time Scottish Cup runner-up.

McInally also played for Celtic, Nottingham Forest (1985 Player of the Year), Coventry City, Raith Rovers, Dundee and Sligo Rovers. He gained 10 full caps with the Scotland national football team for whom he played at the UEFA Euro 1992 finals in Sweden.

His management career began with a player-manager role at Sligo Rovers. After his playing retirement he took charge of Greenock Morton, East Stirlingshire and was then manager of Peterhead for 11 years.

== Playing career ==
=== Celtic and loan to Dundee ===
McInally began senior his career at left back with Celtic, the team he supported as a boy. He won Scotland youth caps and then debuted under Billy McNeil on 28 August 1982 in a 7-1 league cup victory at Dunfermline Athletic. However McNeil left in June 1983 and was replaced by Davie Hay who had no plans for McInally at Celtic. In January 1984 McInally was loaned to Dundee where he scored twice in his 11 league games. McInally left after only one appearance for Celtic in each of the league and the Scottish Cup to add to his debut in the league cup against Dunfermline.

=== Nottingham Forest ===
He was flown down by Brian Clough to watch Nottingham Forest against Manchester United for the final league game of the 1983/84 season (Forest won 2--0). He was a guest of Forest at the game with two other players they were signing, Johnny Metgod and Gary Megson. McInally's Forest debut came during an end of season tour in Australia. While living in Nottingham's Balmoral Hotel he spent Christmas as a guest at the Clough household. McInally was player of the year at the end of his first Forest season. Despite this success he stayed at Forest for only 18 months. In the summer of 1985 Stuart Pearce was signed by Clough. Pearce was the makeweight in a £300,000 deal bringing Coventry centre-back Ian Butterworth to Forest. So unsure was Pearce of his footballing future that after the transfer he advertised his services as an electrician in Forest's match-day programme. However Pearce immediately established himself at left back making 30 league appearances before the end of the season. McInally played beside Pearce in some games that season before leaving after his last game on 26 December 1985. McInally's last game was a 1–0 win away at Birmingham City.

=== Coventry City ===
McInally moved in the opposite direction to Pearce joining Dave Bowman at Coventry City for £112,000. He played five first team games there before he and Bowman double transferred to Scotland at the end of the season.

=== Dundee United ===
McInally and Bowman joined Dundee United in the summer of 1986 in a £140,000 joint transfer. At Tannadice McInally quickly became an effective defensive midfielder and played an important part in Dundee United's run to the UEFA Cup Final in his first season. McInally scored the opener in the home leg of the third round tie against Hajduk Split. United beat F.C. Barcelona home and away and then eliminated Borussia Mönchengladbach in the semi-final. They lost 2–1 on aggregate in the final to IFK Goteborg.

Bowman and McInally played in three losing Dundee United Scottish final teams. These were in 1987 to St Mirren, 1988 to Celtic and the 1991 final to Motherwell in which Bowman scored. They collected a winners medal from the 1994 Scottish Cup Final win against Rangers.

=== Raith Rovers ===
In 1995, following United's relegation to the Scottish Football League First Division, McInally remained in the Premier Division by joining newly promoted Raith Rovers as player/coach.

In early 1996, McInally was due to join Aberdeen in a swap deal for Peter Hetherston, and was paraded at a Pittodrie news conference. Hetherston however failed a medical and the move collapsed.

=== Dundee United (second spell) ===
A few weeks into the following season, McInally moved back to Tannadice and made sixteen appearances.

=== Dundee ===
He then moved back to Dundee as a player-coach at Dens Park.

=== Scotland ===
McInally's first full cap was on 1 April 1987 losing 4–1 in a European Championship qualifier away to Belgium. He was selected for the Scotland squad for the UEFA Euro 1992 finals in Sweden. In Sweden he played in Scotland's third and final game as a 65th-minute substitute for Ally McCoist. The Scots won that game 3–0 against the CIS. McInally had played in two of the qualifiers both of which were 1–1 draws against Bulgaria. His 10th and final cap was the 5–0 defeat away to Portugal on 28 April 1993 that all but extinguished Scottish hopes of qualifying for the 1994 FIFA World Cup.

== Management career ==
=== Sligo Rovers ===
McInally joined Sligo Rovers as manager at the start of the 1999–00 season but early results did not go his way and he left the club for personal reasons. He returned to Scotland and joined the coaching staff of Celtic, working with the club's youth teams.

=== Greenock Morton ===
McInally moved back into management as he was appointed manager of Scottish Second Division side Greenock Morton. In the 2005–06 season, he led Morton to 2nd place in the Division after which they were subsequently denied promotion by losing to Peterhead in the play-offs. McInally stated his intention to win the Second Division in the 2006–07 season, with that objective met in mid April when nearest challengers Stirling Albion fell out of mathematical contention. He won the August 2006 Second Division Manager of the Month award, along the way. He resigned in February 2008 after a run of poor results allowed Morton to slip into ninth place in the First Division.

=== East Stirlingshire ===
On 13 March 2008, McInally was named the new manager of Third Division strugglers East Stirlingshire, succeeding Gordon Wylde who resigned a month earlier. McInally was named November 2008 Manager of the Month for the Third Division by the Scottish Football League. He then won the same award in February and September 2009, but resigned in May 2011 after the club finished second bottom of the 2010–11 Scottish Third Division.

=== Peterhead ===
McInally was appointed manager of Peterhead in October 2011. He led the Blue Toon to its first trophy as a football league club by winning the Scottish League Two title in season 2013–14. The club were relegated back to the fourth tier via the play-offs in season 2016–17. McInally offered to resign after Peterhead failed to win promotion in 2017–18, but the board of directors asked him to stay on. He then won the Scottish League Two title the next season, securing it on the last day.

He resigned on 14 November 2022 after 11 years in the job, with Peterhead sitting bottom of the 2022–23 Scottish League One table.

== Personal life ==
McInally is the uncle of Falkirk player Anna Murray.

== Career statistics ==
=== International appearances ===
Appearances and goals by national team and year
National team	Year	Apps	Goals
Scotland	1987	2	0
Scotland	1988	1	0
Scotland	1989	—	
Scotland	1990	1	0
Scotland	1991	1	0
Scotland	1992	3	0
Scotland	1993	2	0
Total		10	0

=== Managerial record ===
As of match played 12 November 2022

Team	From	To	Record				
Team	From	To	G	W	D	L	Win %
Sligo Rovers	1 July 1999	16 November 1999	13	3	2	8	23.08
Greenock Morton	21 October 2004	19 February 2008	155	80	31	44	51.61
East Stirlingshire	13 March 2008	16 May 2011	141	58	21	62	41.13
Peterhead	7 October 2011	14 November 2022	463	197	90	176	42.55
Total			772	338	144	290	43.78

== Honours and awards ==
=== Player ===
Nottingham Forest

- Player of the Year 1984–85

Dundee United

- 1987 UEFA Cup Finalist
- 1993–94 Scottish Cup winner
- Hall of Fame 2015 inductee

=== Manager ===
Greenock Morton

- Scottish Second Division: 2006–07

Peterhead

- Scottish League Two (2): 2013–14, 2018–19
