= Tom Hendrie =

Scottish footballer and manager

Personal information
- Date of birth: 24 October 1955 (age 71)
- Place of birth: Edinburgh, Scotland
- Positions: Midfielder; full back

Youth career
- Tynecastle Boys Club

Senior career*
Years	Team	Apps	(Gls)
1975–1976	Dundee	2	(0)
1976–1977	Arbroath	3	(0)
1977–1978	Gateshead		
1978–1980	Goole Town		
1980–1992	Meadowbank Thistle	335	(30)
1992–1993	Berwick Rangers	30	(0)
Total		370	(30)

Managerial career
- 1994–1996: Berwick Rangers
- 1996–1998: Alloa Athletic
- 1998–2002: St Mirren
- 2003–2006: Alloa Athletic
- 2013–2014: Craigroyston
- 2014–2016: Whitburn
- * Club domestic league appearances and goals

Thomas Hendrie (born 24 October 1955) is a Scottish former professional football player and manager.

== Playing career ==
A midfielder, Hendrie plied his trade at a number of clubs in the late 1970s, Dundee, Arbroath, Gateshead and Goole Town before settling at Meadowbank Thistle in 1980. He made 335 appearances for the club, scoring 30 goals before leaving to join Berwick Rangers in 1992.

== Managerial career ==
Hendrie became manager of Berwick in January 1994. In his first season he took them to second place in the Second Division, narrowly missing out on promotion due to league reconstruction. In 1996, he moved to Alloa Athletic and took them to the Third Division championship in 1998. He then took over as manager of St Mirren, and 2000 guided them to the Scottish First Division championship. However, he was unable to keep them in the SPL and they were relegated the following year. Form was poor in the 2001–02 season, and following a heavy defeat to Inverness Caley Thistle in September 2002, Hendrie was relieved of his duties. He returned to Alloa in November 2003, but was unable to recover the form from his earlier tenure, and was ultimately sacked in January 2006. He worked as a scout for Hearts for the remainder of the 2005–06 season.

Hendrie became the manager of Junior side Whitburn in September 2014. After leading the club to promotion from the Scottish Junior Football East Region South Division in 2015–16, he parted company with the club the following October.

For much of his career, Hendrie's involvement in football has been part-time, developing a simultaneous career as a school teacher. He was a maths teacher at Lasswade High School in Bonnyrigg and Preston Lodge High School in Prestonpans until his appointment at St Mirren. After leaving St Mirren he resumed his teaching career at Craigmount High School in Edinburgh.

== Honours ==
Alloa Athletic

- Stirlingshire Cup: 1996–97
- Scottish Third Division: 1997–98

St Mirren

- Scottish First Division: 1999–2000
- Renfrewshire Cup: 2000–01, 2001–02

Individual awards

- SPL Manager of the Month: April 2001.
