= Gardner Speirs =

Scottish footballer & manager (born 1963)

Personal information
- Full name: Walter Gardner Speirs
- Date of birth: 14 April 1963 (age 63)
- Place of birth: Airdrie, Scotland
- Position: Midfielder

Team information
- Current team: Queen's Park (Head of Youth Development)

Youth career
- –1980: St Mirren B.C.

Senior career*
Years	Team	Apps	(Gls)
1980–1989	St Mirren	90	(16)
1988	→ Kilmarnock (loan)	5	(0)
1989	→ Dunfermline Athletic (loan)	4	(0)
1989	Hartlepool United	1	(0)
1990	Airdrieonians	9	(1)
1990–1991	Bathgate Thistle		
1991–1992	East Stirlingshire	19	(2)

Managerial career
- 1996–1998: Clyde
- 2002: Aberdeen (caretaker)
- 2005–2006: Ross County (caretaker)
- 2008–2013: Queen's Park
- 2021–2022: Queen's Park (caretaker)
- * Club domestic league appearances and goals

Walter Gardner Speirs (born 14 April 1963) is a Scottish football manager and former player.

== Career ==
=== Playing ===
During his playing career, Speirs played for St Mirren, Kilmarnock (on loan), Dunfermline Athletic (on loan), Hartlepool United, Airdrieonians, Bathgate Thistle and East Stirlingshire.

=== Managerial ===
He was on the coaching staff at Clyde, and from 1996 to 1998 held the position of Manager. Subsequently, he joined the coaching staff at Aberdeen, eventually taking the role of assistant manager and in December 2002 was briefly named caretaker manager following the resignation of Ebbe Skovdahl. He worked as caretaker manager of Ross County in October 2005 until the end of the 2005–06 season. He became assistant manager of Partick Thistle in May 2007.

He became manager at Queen's Park after taking over from Billy Stark in 2008. Speirs extended his contract at the end of the 2009–10 season for a further two years, subsequently signing another extension on 27 January 2012 through until 2014. He left Queen's Park by mutual consent in December 2013.

Spiers briefly joined the Rangers Academy as a youth coach in March 2015. On 28 August 2015, Gardner joined Lowland League side East Kilbride as assistant manager. He left that position in March 2016.

Having performed the role of Head of Youth Development for Queen's Park for a few years, Speirs was named as caretaker manager of the club on 31 December 2021, following the departure of Laurie Ellis.

== Managerial statistics ==
As of 17 May 2022

Team	Nat	From	To	Record				
Team	Nat	From	To	G	W	D	L	Win %
Clyde	(Scotland)	1996	1998					
Aberdeen (caretaker)	(Scotland)	2002	2002	1	0	1	0	0.00
Ross County (caretaker)	(Scotland)	October 2005	June 2006	28	11	10	7	39.29
Queen's Park	(Scotland)	January 2008	December 2013	258	92	54	112	35.66
Queen's Park (caretaker)	(Scotland)	December 2021	June 2022	22	7	11	4	31.82
