= 2013–14 Dumbarton F.C. season =

Dumbarton
2013–14 season
- Manager: Ian Murray
- Stadium: Bet Butler Stadium, Dumbarton
- Scottish Championship: 5th
- Scottish Cup: Sixth round
- Scottish League Cup: Second Round
- League Challenge Cup: First Round
- Top goalscorer: League: Mitchel Megginson/ Chris Kane (10); All: Mitchel Megginson (12)
- Highest home attendance: 1,469
- Lowest home attendance: 463
- Average home league attendance: 931

Season 2013–14 was the 130th football season in which Dumbarton competed at a Scottish national level, entering the Scottish Football League for the 108th time, the Scottish Cup for the 119th time, the Scottish League Cup for the 67th time and the Scottish Challenge Cup for the 23rd time.

== Overview ==
The 2013–14 season was Dumbarton's second consecutive season in the second tier of Scottish football - the Scottish Championship, having been promoted from the Scottish Second Division at the end of the 2011–12 season.

Following Ian Murray's appointment which brought about transformation in Dumbarton's fortunes the previous season. At one point there was a chance that Dumbarton would challenge for a play-off place for the Premier Division. In the end, 5th place was achieved.

In the Scottish Cup, there was more good news as Dumbarton would have their best cup run in almost 40 years, and would only lose out to Premier Division Aberdeen by the only goal after a tight fought match.

In the League Cup, after disposing of Albion Rovers in the first round, it would be Premier Division Dundee United that would advance, but only after a close match was lost by the odd goal in five.

Finally, despite the other successes, it was no real surprise that the League Challenge Cup saw yet another first round exit, this time to Stranraer.

Locally, in the Stirlingshire Cup, Falkirk would be the victors over Dumbarton in the semi-final tie.

== Results & fixtures ==
Win Draw Loss Postponed

=== Preseason ===
29 June 2013 Friendly	Dumbarton	1–1	Hibernian	Dumbarton Football Stadium
15:00	McKerracher 52'	Scotland on Sunday	Harris 50'	Attendance: 1,000; Referee: E Anderson

6 July 2013 Friendly	Civil Service Strollers	0–3	Dumbarton	Christie Gillies Park, Edinburgh
15:00		Report	Chris Turner 50'; Mitchel Megginson 72'; Steven McDougall 82'	Attendance: 111; Referee: M Taylor

13 July 2013 Friendly	Dumbarton	3–4	Partick Thistle	Dumbarton Football Stadium
15:00	Gilhaney 4'; Agnew 47'; Megginson 71'		Craigen 9'; Forbes 19'; O'Donnell 28'; Kerr 56'	Attendance: 750; Referee: G Aitken

16 July 2013 Friendly	Brechin City	1–1	Dumbarton	University of Stirling playing fields
19:30	(pen.)	Report	Smith 17'	Attendance: 50

18 July 2013 Friendly	Queen's Park	5–4	Dumbarton	Lesser Hampden
19:30	18'; 39' (pen.); 44' (pen.)	Report	Scott Agnew 50', 51' (pen.), 61'; Jordan Kirkpatrick	Attendance: 75

30 July 2013 Friendly	Dumbarton	5–1	Clydebank	Dumbarton Football Stadium
19:30	Bryan Prunty; Martin McNiff; Mitchel Megginson; McKerracher; Trialist	Report	Goal	Attendance: 1,000

=== SPFL Championship ===
10 August 2013 Championship	Dumbarton	1–1	Falkirk	Dumbarton Football Stadium
15:00	Bryan Prunty 84'	Report	McGrandles 61'	Attendance: 1,224; Referee: Calum Murray

17 August 2013 Championship	Hamilton	4–1	Dumbarton	New Douglas Park
15:00	Keatings 28' (pen.), 30'; Gillespie 72'; Andreu 77'	Report	Scott Agnew 67' (pen.)	Attendance: 995; Referee: Kevin Clancy

24 August 2013 Championship	Dumbarton	3–1	Morton	Dumbarton Football Stadium
15:00	Mitchel Megginson 18'; Colin Nish 42'; Steven McDougall 84'	Report	Imrie 19' (pen.)	Attendance: 1,171; Referee: William Collum

31 August 2013 Championship	Cowdenbeath	3–2	Dumbarton	Central Park, Cowdenbeath
15:00	Stevenson 21'; Robertson 72'; Hemmings 90'	Report	Chris Turner 51', 64'	Attendance: 384; Referee: Stevie O'Reilly

14 September 2013 Championship	Alloa Athletic	1–2	Dumbarton	Recreation Park, Alloa
15:00	Simmons 54'	Report	Andy Graham 45'; Scott Agnew 71' (pen.)	Attendance: 626; Referee: Craig Charleston

21 September 2013 Championship	Dumbarton	1–2	Livingston	Dumbarton Football Stadium
15:00	Mitchel Megginson 44'	Report	McNulty 49', 76'	Attendance: 759; Referee: Greg Aitken

28 September 2013 Championship	Queen of the South	1–2	Dumbarton	Palmerston Park
15:00	Russell 26'	Report	Chris Turner 19'; Bryan Prunty 87'	Attendance: 1,693; Referee: Kevin Clancy

5 October 2013 Championship	Dumbarton	2–4	Raith Rovers	Dumbarton Football Stadium
15:00	Bryan Prunty 89', 90+2' (pen.)	Report	Elliot 17'; Spence 56' (pen.); Hill 61'; Vaughan 90+5'	Attendance: 843; Referee: Brian Colvin

12 October 2013 Championship	Dumbarton	1–4	Dundee	Dumbarton Football Stadium
15:00	Jordan Kirkpatrick 78'	Report	MacDonald 49', 71' (pen.); Conroy 68'; Rae 88'	Attendance: 1,175; Referee: Barry Cook

19 October 2013 Championship	Falkirk	1–2	Dumbarton	Falkirk Stadium
15:00	Roberts 39'	Report	Garry Fleming 7'; Mitchel Megginson 24'	Attendance: 2,704; Referee: George Salmond

26 October 2013 Championship	Dumbarton	0–0	Cowdenbeath	Dumbarton Football Stadium
15:00		Report		Attendance: 700; Referee: Don Robertson

9 November 2013 Championship	Morton	2–0	Dumbarton	Cappielow Park
15:00	McLaughlin 60'; Peciar 88'	Report		Attendance: 1,687; Referee: Stevie O'Reilly

16 November 2013 Championship	Livingston	1–3	Dumbarton	Almondvale Stadium
15:00	McNulty 20'	Report	Mitchel Megginson 43'; Chris Turner 52' (pen.); Bryan Prunty 74'	Attendance: 1,039; Referee: Stephen Finnie

4 December 2013 Championship	Dumbarton	1–1	Alloa Athletic	Dumbarton Football Stadium
19:30	Bryan Prunty 78'	Report	Cawley 24'	Attendance: 463; Referee: Alan Muir

7 December 2013 Championship	Dumbarton	0–1	Queen of the South	Dumbarton Football Stadium
15:00		Report	Russell 15'	Attendance: 824; Referee: Brian Colvin

14 December 2013 Championship	Raith Rovers	2–1	Dumbarton	Starks Park
15:00	Vaughan 51'; Thomson 74'	Report	Steven McDougall 90'	Attendance: 1,351; Referee: Calum Murray

21 December 2013 Championship	Dumbarton	2–1	Hamilton	Dumbarton Football Stadium
15:00	Garry Fleming 11'; Andy Graham 71'	Report	Keatings 33'	Attendance: 642; Referee: John McKendrick

28 December 2013 Championship	Dundee	3–0	Dumbarton	Dens Park
15:00	MacDonald 46', 90'; McBride 82'	Report		Attendance: 4,489; Referee: Brian Colvin

4 January 2014 Championship	Dumbarton	2–0	Morton	Dumbarton Football Stadium
15:00	Bryan Prunty 45+1' (pen.); Chris Kane 82'	Report		Attendance: 1,469; Referee: Kevin Clancy

11 January 2014 Championship	Cowdenbeath	2–4	Dumbarton	Central Park, Cowdenbeath
15:00	Miller 3'; Stevenson 27'	Report	Colin Nish 4'; Mitchel Megginson 22', 83'; Chris Kane 51'	Attendance: 434; Referee: Mat Northcroft

18 January 2014 Championship	Alloa Athletic	1–5	Dumbarton	Recreation Park, Alloa
15:00	Cawley 71'	Report	Mark McLaughlin 9'; Chris Turner (30)); Chris Kane 42' (pen.), 76'; Jordan Kirkpatrick 81'	Attendance: 602; Referee: Barry Cook

1 February 2014 Championship	Hamilton	3–3	Dumbarton	New Douglas Park
15:00	Keatings 4', 71'; Scotland 88'	Report	Jordan Kirkpatrick 27'; Hendrie(OG) 69'; Chris Kane 89'	Attendance: 1,061; Referee: Des Roache

5 February 2014 Championship	Dumbarton	2–2	Livingston	Dumbarton Football Stadium
19:30	Colin Nish 72'; Chris Kane 90+5'	Report	Jacobs 66'; Barrowman 79'	Attendance: 562; Referee: Stevie O'Reilly

15 February 2014 Championship	Dumbarton	2–1	Falkirk	Dumbarton Football Stadium
15:00	Mitchel Megginson 63'; Jordan Kirkpatrick 73'	Report	Loy 29'	Attendance: 1,003; Referee: Greg Aitken

22 February 2014 Championship	Dumbarton	3–3	Raith Rovers	Dumbarton Football Stadium
15:00	Colin Nish 24'; Chris Kane 37'; Scott Agnew 64'	Report	Smith 29', 61'; Baird 57'	Attendance: 786; Referee: Don Robertson

1 March 2014 Championship	Queen of the South	3–1	Dumbarton	Palmerston Park
15:00	Durnan 30'; Reilly 45+2'; McHugh 66'	Report	Michael Miller 71'	Attendance: 1,604; Referee: Steven McLean

15 March 2014 Championship	Dumbarton	5–1	Cowdenbeath	Dumbarton Football Stadium
15:00	Mitchel Megginson 22'; Michael Miller 55'; Jordan Kirkpatrick 73'; Garry Fleming 81'; Chris Kane 90+1'	Report	Armstrong 63'	Attendance: 687; Referee: Crawford Allan

22 March 2014 Championship	Dumbarton	0–1	Dundee	Dumbarton Football Stadium
15:00		Report	MacDonald (83))	Attendance: 1,222; Referee: Brian Colvin

25 March 2014 Championship	Falkirk	2–0	Dumbarton	Falkirk Stadium
19:45	McCracken 25'; Loy 73'	Report		Attendance: 2,489; Referee: Stephen Finnie

29 March 2014 Championship	Livingston	1–2	Dumbarton	Almondvale Stadium
15:00	Mevlja 28'	Report	Chris Turner 86' (pen.); Chris Kane 88'	Attendance: 949; Referee: Greg Aitken

1 April 2014 Championship	Morton	3–0	Dumbarton	Cappielow Park
19:30	Vine 14'; O'Ware 38'; McKay 57'	Report		Attendance: 826; Referee: Alan Muir

5 April 2014 Championship	Dumbarton	4–1	Alloa Athletic	Dumbarton Football Stadium
15:00	Mark Gilhaney 25'; Garry Fleming 48'; Scott Agnew 80'; Chris Kane 83'	Report	Caddis 88'	Attendance: 677; Referee: Andrew Dallas

12 April 2014 Championship	Raith Rovers	1–3	Dumbarton	Starks Park
15:00	Smith 59'	Report	Mark Gilhaney 22'; Mitchel Megginson 28'; Colin Nish 50'	Attendance: 1,602; Referee: Craig Charleston

19 April 2014 Championship	Dumbarton	0–3	Queen of the South	Dumbarton Football Stadium
15:00		Report	Russell 17'; Lyle 52'; Holy 66'	Attendance: 1,263; Referee: Kevin Graham

26 April 2014 Championship	Dumbarton	4–1	Hamilton	Dumbarton Football Stadium
15:00	Scott Agnew 32'; Colin Nish 77'; Mitchel Megginson 85'; Jordan Kirkpatrick 87'	Report	Scotland 41'	Attendance: 1,420; Referee: George Salmond

3 May 2014 Championship	Dundee	2–1	Dumbarton	Dens Park
15:00	Nade 25'; MacDonald 36'	Report	Scott Agnew 69' (pen.)	Attendance: 10,718; Referee: Bobby Madden

=== Ramsden Cup ===
27 July 2013 Scottish Challenge Cup round 1	Stranraer	4–2	Dumbarton	Stair Park
15:00	Winter 10'; Grehan 67'; Aitken 83', 88' (pen.)	Report	Garry Fleming 26'; Kevin Smith 45'	Attendance: 333; Referee: John McKendrick

=== Scottish League Cup ===
3 August 2013 Scottish League Cup round 1	Dumbarton	1–0	Albion Rovers	Dumbarton Football Stadium
15:00	Mark Gilhaney 42'	Report		Attendance: 505; Referee: Barry Cook

28 August 2013 Scottish League Cup round 2	Dumbarton	2–3	Dundee United	Dumbarton Football Stadium
19:45	Kevin Smith 34'; Mitchel Megginson 87'	Report	Ciftci 69', 89'; Gauld 77'	Attendance: 1,045; Referee: Alan Muir

=== Scottish Cup ===
2 November 2013 Scottish Cup round 3	Dumbarton	2–1	Cowdenbeath	Dumbarton Football Stadium
15:00	Jordan Kirkpatrick 19', 64'	Report	Stevenson 61'	Attendance: 450

30 November 2014 Scottish Cup round 4	Berwick Rangers	1–3	Dumbarton	Shielfield Park
15:00	Currie 8'	Report	Bryan Prunty 30'; Mitchel Megginson 43'; Scott Linton 56'	Attendance: 406

8 February 2014 Scottish Cup round 5	Dumbarton	1–0	Alloa Athletic	Dumbarton Football Stadium
15:00	Colin Nish 31'	Report		Attendance: 749; Referee: Calum Murray

8 March 2014 Scottish Cup round 6	Aberdeen	1–0	Dumbarton	Pittodrie Park
15:00	Rooney 52'	Report		Attendance: 10,600; Referee: Kevin Clancy

=== Stirlingshire Cup ===
24 September 2013 Semi-final	Dumbarton	1–3	Falkirk	Dumbarton Football Stadium
19:30	Kevin Smith 3'	Report	Faulds 27'; Shepherd 34'; Small 43'	Attendance: 450; Referee: C Steven

== Player statistics ==
No.	Pos	Nat	Player	Total		Championship		Challenge Cup		League Cup		Scottish Cup	
No.	Pos	Nat	Player	Apps	Goals	Apps	Goals	Apps	Goals	Apps	Goals	Apps	Goals
	GK	(Scotland) SCO	Jamie Ewings	32	0	27+0	0	2+0	0	1+0	0	2+0	0
	GK	(Scotland) SCO	Stephen Grindlay	11	0	9+0	0	0+0	0	0+0	0	2+0	0
	DF	(Republic of Ireland) IRL	Aaron Barry	22	0	18+0	0	2+0	0	0+0	0	2+0	0
	DF	(Scotland) SCO	Scott Linton	35	1	29+0	0	1+0	0	1+0	0	4+0	1
	DF	(Scotland) SCO	Paul McGinn	42	0	35+0	0	2+0	0	1+0	0	4+0	0
	DF	(Scotland) SCO	Mark McLaughlin	14	1	13+0	1	0+0	0	0+0	0	1+0	0
	DF	(Scotland) SCO	Scott Smith	9	0	5+1	0	2+0	0	0+0	0	1+0	0
	MF	(Scotland) SCO	Scott Agnew	30	6	18+7	6	1+0	0	1+0	0	2+1	0
	MF	(Scotland) SCO	Mark Gilhaney	40	3	31+3	2	1+0	1	1+0	0	4+0	0
	MF	(Scotland) SCO	Andy Graham	43	2	36+0	2	2+0	0	1+0	0	4+0	0
	MF	(Scotland) SCO	Jordan Kirkpatrick	36	8	24+8	6	0+0	0	0+0	0	4+0	2
	MF	(Scotland) SCO	Michael Miller	14	2	9+3	2	0+0	0	0+0	0	1+1	0
	MF	(Scotland) SCO	Hugh Murray	18	0	12+4	0	1+0	0	0+0	0	1+0	0
	MF	(Scotland) SCO	Nick Phinn	2	0	0+1	0	0+0	0	1+0	0	0+0	0
	MF	(Northern Ireland) NIR	Chris Turner	33	6	30+0	6	2+0	0	0+0	0	1+0	0
	FW	(Scotland) SCO	Garry Fleming	34	5	12+16	4	1+1	0	1+0	1	1+2	0
	FW	(Scotland) SCO	Chris Kane	20	10	13+5	10	0+0	0	0+0	0	2+0	0
	FW	(Scotland) SCO	Steven McDougall	22	2	4+14	2	2+0	0	1+0	0	0+1	0
	FW	(Scotland) SCO	Alistair McKerracher	5	0	0+2	0	0+1	0	0+1	0	0+1	0
	FW	(Scotland) SCO	Mitchel Megginson	42	12	32+3	10	1+1	1	0+1	0	4+0	1
	FW	(Scotland) SCO	Colin Nish	38	7	23+10	6	0+1	0	0+0	0	3+1	1
	FW	(Scotland) SCO	Bryan Prunty	37	8	13+17	7	2+0	0	0+1	0	1+3	1
	FW	(Scotland) SCO	Kevin Smith	14	2	3+7	0	1+1	1	1+0	1	1+0	0

== Transfers ==
=== Players in ===
Player	From	Fee
(Scotland) Scott Smith	(Scotland) Hibernian	Free
(Scotland) Paul McGinn	(Scotland) St Mirren	Free
(Scotland) Scott Linton	(Scotland) Cowdenbeath	Free
(Scotland) Mitchel Megginson	(Scotland) Aberdeen	Free
(Scotland) Kevin Smith	(Scotland) Queen of the South	Free
(Republic of Ireland) Aaron Barry	(England) Sheffield United	Loan
(Scotland) Jordan Kirkpatrick	(Scotland) Airdrie	Free
(Scotland) Colin Nish	(England) Hartlepool United	Free
(Scotland) Hugh Murray	(Scotland) Partick Thistle	Free
(Scotland) Chris Kane	(Scotland) St Johnstone	Loan
(Scotland) Mark McLaughlin	(Scotland) Morton	Free
(Scotland) Michael Miller	(Scotland) Celtic	Loan

=== Players out ===
Player	To	Fee
(Scotland) Gary McKell	Free agent	Free
(Scotland) Robbie Winters	Free agent	Free
(Scotland) James Creaney	Free agent	Free
(Scotland) Mark Lamont	Free agent	Free
(Scotland) Ryan Metcalfe	Free agent	Free
(Scotland) Reese Pearson	Free agent	Free
(Scotland) Ross Forsyth	Free agent	Free
(Scotland) Phil Johnston	Free agent	Free
(Scotland) Marc McCusker	Free agent	Free
(Scotland) Jamie Lyden	Free agent	Free
(Scotland) Kevin Nicoll	Free agent	Free
(Scotland) Glenn Thomson	Free agent	Free
(Scotland) Owen Ronald	(Scotland) Berwick Rangers	Loan
(Scotland) Martin McNiff	(Scotland) Annan Athletic	Loan
(Scotland) Josh Horne	Free agent	Free
(Scotland) Joe Coleman	(Scotland) Kilbirnie Ladeside	Loan
(Scotland) Martin McNiff	Free agent	Free
(Scotland) Kevin Smith	Free agent	Free
(Scotland) Jim Lister	(Scotland) Airdrie	Free
(Scotland) Alan Lithgow	(Scotland) Ayr United	Free
(Scotland) Jason Marr	Free agent	Free

== Trivia ==
- The League match against Queen of the South on 7 December marked Bryan Prunty's 100th appearance for Dumbarton in all national competitions – the 134th Dumbarton player to reach this milestone.
- The League match against Hamilton on 1 February marked Scott Agnew's 100th appearance for Dumbarton in all national competitions – the 135th Dumbarton player to reach this milestone.

== See also ==
- 2013–14 in Scottish football
