= 2012–13 Dumbarton F.C. season =

Dumbarton
2012–13 season
- Chairman: Alan Jardine
- Manager: Alan Adamson (Until 22 October); Ian Murray (From 22 November)
- Stadium: Dumbarton Football Stadium
- First Division: 7th
- Challenge Cup: First round (eliminated by Queen of the South)
- League Cup: Second round (eliminated by Livingston)
- Scottish Cup: Fourth round (eliminated by Hamilton Academical)
- Top goalscorer: League: Jim Lister (12); All: Jim Lister (15)
- Highest home attendance: 1,528 vs Partick Thistle First Division, 4 May 2013
- Lowest home attendance: 446 vs East Stirlingshire Scottish Cup, 3 November 2012
- Average home league attendance: League: 928
| Home colours | Away colours |

The 2012–13 season was Dumbarton's first season back in the Scottish First Division, having been promoted from the Scottish Second Division at the end of the 2011–12 season. Dumbarton also competed in the Challenge Cup, League Cup and the Scottish Cup.

== Summary ==
=== Season ===
Dumbarton finished seventh in the Scottish First Division. They reached the first round of the Challenge Cup, the second round of the League Cup and the fourth round of the Scottish Cup.

=== Management ===
They began the season under the management of Alan Adamson. But on 22 October 2012, Adamson was sacked by the club following what was deemed a number of unacceptable results. Jack Ross took over as interim manager following Adamson's departure, while the club looked for a replacement. On 22 November, Ian Murray was appointed as player-manager. Jack Ross was named as his assistant, and he remained in charge for their game that weekend against Dunfermline Athletic.

== Results and fixtures ==
Win Draw Loss Postponed

=== Preseason ===
| 10 July 2012 Friendly (Closed Door) | Dumbarton | 2–1 | Brechin City |
| 19:15 | Fleming; Lister | Report | Goal |

| 14 July 2012 Friendly (Closed Door) | Dumbarton | 0–0 | Queen's Park |
| | | Report |

| 17 July 2012 Friendly (Closed Door) | Dumbarton | 3–3 | Albion Rovers |
| | Lister; Agnew | Report | Goal |

| 21 July 2012 Friendly | Dumbarton | 4–1 | Clydebank | Dumbarton Football Stadium |
| 15:00 | Gilhaney 41'; Lister; McDougall 58'; Prunty 73' | Report | Strachan 31' | Referee: Anderson |

| 24 July 2012 Friendly | Dumbarton | 0–0 | St Mirren | Dumbarton Football Stadium |
| 19:30 | | Dumbarton Report; Report | | Referee: Cook |

=== Scottish First Division ===
| 11 August 2012 Scottish First Division | Airdrie United | 4–1 | Dumbarton | Excelsior Stadium |
| 15:00 | Boyle 14', 25', 31'; Di Giacomo 88' | SFL Report | Lister 62' | Attendance: 897; Referee: Beaton |

| 18 August 2012 Scottish First Division | Dumbarton | 0–3 | Cowdenbeath | Dumbarton Football Stadium |
| 15:00 | | SFL Report | Coult 9'; Stewart 17'; McKenzie 82' (Penalty) | Attendance: 695; Referee: Muir |

| 25 August 2012 Scottish First Division | Partick Thistle | 3–0 | Dumbarton | Firhill Stadium |
| 15:00 | Doolan 16'; Erskine 63'; Bannigan 70' | SFL Report | | Attendance: 2,944; Referee: Finnie |

| 1 September 2012 Scottish First Division | Greenock Morton | 3–0 | Dumbarton | Cappielow Park |
| 15:00 | Archie Campbell 43', 54' (Penalty), 76' | SFL Report | | Attendance: 1,602; Referee: Madden |

| 15 September 2012 Scottish First Division | Dumbarton | 0–2 | Dunfermline Athletic | Dumbarton Football Stadium |
| 15:00 | | SFL Report | Kirk 41'; Jordan 52' | Attendance: 1,021; Referee: Madden |

| 22 September 2012 Scottish First Division | Dumbarton | 3–3 | Hamilton Academical | Dumbarton Football Stadium |
| 15:00 | Kilday 34' (Own goal); Lister 73'; Prunty 77' | Report | Crawford 21'; Keatings 88', 95' | Attendance: 695; Referee: McKendrick |

| 29 September 2012 Scottish First Division | Livingston | 5–0 | Dumbarton | Braidwood Motor Company Stadium |
| 15:00 | McNulty 9', 36'; Barr 12'; Booth 65'; Jacobs 77' | SFL Report | | Attendance: 1,021; Referee: Salmond |

| 6 October 2012 Scottish First Division | Raith Rovers | 2–2 | Dumbarton | Stark's Park |
| 15:00 | Graham 23'; Spence 69' | SFL Report | Lister 52'; Prunty 90' | Attendance: 1,425; Referee: Tumilty |

| 20 October 2012 Scottish First Division | Dumbarton | 0–2 | Falkirk | Dumbarton Football Stadium |
| 15:00 | | SFL Report | Taylor 16'; Weatherston 32' | Attendance: 1,041; Referee: Finnie |

| 27 October 2012 Scottish First Division | Dumbarton | 3–4 | Airdrie United | Dumbarton Football Stadium |
| 15:00 | Prunty 23'; Lister 27'; McDougall 75' | SFL Report | Stallard 65'; Watt 68'; Forsyth 89' (o.g.); Blockley 90+5' | Attendance: 774; Referee: Collum |

| 10 November 2012 Scottish First Division | Cowdenbeath | 0–1 | Dumbarton | Central Park |
| 15:00 | | SFL Report | Gilhaney 29' | Attendance: 415; Referee: Tumilty |

| 17 November 2012 Scottish First Division | Dumbarton | 1–5 | Greenock Morton | Dumbarton Football Stadium |
| 15:00 | Prunty 84' | SFL Report | Hardie 3' (pen.), 17'; Weatherson 37', 61'; Graham 54' | Attendance: 1,188; Referee: O'Reilly |

| 24 November 2012 Scottish First Division | Dunfermline Athletic | 4–0 | Dumbarton | East End Park |
| 15:00 | Falkingham 31'; Graham 37' (Own goal); Wallace 69' (pen.); Cardle 90' | SFL Report | Grindlay (red card) 67' | Attendance: 3,565; Referee: Roache |

| 8 December 2012 Scottish First Division | Hamilton Academical | P–P | Dumbarton | New Douglas Park |
| 15:00 | | BBC Report |

| 15 December 2012 Scottish First Division | Dumbarton | P–P | Livingston | Dumbarton Football Stadium |
| 15:00 | | BBC Report |

| 18 December 2012 Scottish First Division | Hamilton Academical | P–P | Dumbarton | New Douglas Park |
| 19:45 | | SFL Report |
Note: Postponed due to Scottish Cup

| 22 December 2012 Scottish First Division | Dumbarton | P–P | Raith Rovers | Dumbarton Football Stadium |
| 15:00 | | SFL Report |
Note: Postponed due to waterlogged pitch

| 29 December 2012 Scottish First Division | Falkirk | 3–4 | Dumbarton | Falkirk Stadium |
| 15:00 | Taylor 43', 86', 89'; Dods (red card) 67' | SFL Report | Lister 45+2', 79'; Agnew 67' (pen.), 76'; Creaney (red card) 82' | Attendance: 3,097; Referee: Salmond |

| 2 January 2013 Scottish First Division | Greenock Morton | 0–3 | Dumbarton | Cappielow |
| 15:00 | | SFL Report | Fleming 32'; Agnew 39'; Prunty 79' | Attendance: 2,414; Referee: Beaton |

| 5 January 2013 Scottish First Division | Dumbarton | 0–1 | Dunfermline Athletic | Dumbarton Football Stadium |
| 15:00 | | SFL Report | Barrowman 1' | Attendance: 1,043; Referee: Brines |

| 12 January 2013 Scottish First Division | Dumbarton | 2–0 | Partick Thistle | Dumbarton Football Stadium |
| 15:00 | Balatoni 21' (Own goal); Prunty 63' | SFL Report | | Attendance: 1,530; Referee: Roache |

| 19 January 2013 Scottish First Division | Airdrie United | 1–2 | Dumbarton | Excelsior Stadium |
| 15:00 | Donnelly 11' | SFL Report | McCusker 24'; Lister 33' | Attendance: 844; Referee: Murray |

| 26 January 2013 Scottish First Division | Dumbarton | 3–1 | Hamilton Academical | Dumbarton Football Stadium |
| 15:00 | Turner 34'; Gilhaney 56'; Page 90+1' (Own goal) | SFL Report | May 60' | Attendance: 878; Referee: Muir |

| 2 February 2013 Scottish First Division | Dumbarton | 3–4 | Livingston | Dumbarton Football Stadium |
| 15:00 | Gilhaney 71'; Lithgow 90'; Prunty 90+4' | BBC Report | Russell 43', 82'; Scougall 47'; Morton 86' | Attendance: 744; Referee: McKendrick |

| 9 February 2013 Scottish First Division | Livingston | 2–3 | Dumbarton | Braidwood Motor Company Stadium |
| 15:00 | Morton 22'; Russell 45+2' (pen.) | SFL Report | Prunty 4'; Graham 23'; Agnew 69' (pen.); Gilhaney (red card) 79' | Attendance: 1,170; Referee: Robertson |

| 16 February 2013 Scottish First Division | Raith Rovers | 3–2 | Dumbarton | Stark's Park |
| 15:00 | Walker 39'; Clarke 52'; Graham 90' | SFL Report | Prunty 45+2', 58' | Attendance: 1,304; Referee: Charleston |

| 23 February 2013 Scottish First Division | Dumbarton | 0–2 | Falkirk | Dumbarton Football Stadium |
| 15:00 | | SFL Report | Grant 25'; Weatherston 30' | Attendance: 997; Referee: Somers |

| 26 February 2013 Scottish First Division | Dumbarton | P – P | Raith Rovers | Dumbarton Football Stadium |
| 19:45 | | BBC Report |

| 2 March 2013 Scottish First Division | Dumbarton | 2–2 | Cowdenbeath | Dumbarton Football Stadium |
| 15:00 | Prunty 66'; Agnew 84' | SFL Report | Stevenson 11'; Moore 90' | Attendance: 742; Referee: Tumilty |

| 9 March 2013 Scottish First Division | Partick Thistle | 3–0 | Dumbarton | Firhill Stadium |
| 15:00 | Lawless 9', 74'; Doolan 81' | SFL Report | | Attendance: 2,715; Referee: Brines |

| 12 March 2013 Scottish First Division | Hamilton Academical | P – P | Dumbarton | New Douglas Park |
| 19:45 | | BBC Report |
Note: Postponed due to frozen pitch

| 16 March 2013 Scottish First Division | Dumbarton | 0–3 | Greenock Morton | Dumbarton Football Stadium |
| 15:00 | | SFL Report | Tidser 32'; Hardie 38'; MacDonald 81' | Attendance: 1,241; Referee: Robertson |

| 23 March 2013 Scottish First Division | Dunfermline Athletic | 3–4 | Dumbarton | East End Park |
| 15:00 | Wallace 41'; Barrowman 49', 56' | SFL Report | McDougall 51', 84'; Turner 59'; Agnew 65' | Attendance: 3,409; Referee: Muir |

| 27 March 2013 Scottish First Division | Dumbarton | 4–2 | Raith Rovers | Dumbarton Football Stadium |
| 19:30 | Lister 36', 64', 84'; Agnew 70' (pen.) | SFL Report | Spence 4'; G.Anderson 25' | Attendance: 483; Referee: Madden |

| 30 March 2013 Scottish First Division | Hamilton Academical | 2–3 | Dumbarton | New Douglas Park |
| 15:00 | Fisher (red card) 34'; Ryan 63'; May 87' | SFL Report | McDougall 24'; Agnew 48'; McGinn 84' | Attendance: 943; Referee: Murray |

| 2 April 2013 Scottish First Division | Hamilton Academical | 2–1 | Dumbarton | New Douglas Park |
| 19:45 | May 79', 85' | SFL Report | Lister 12' | Attendance: 775; Referee: Charleston |

| 6 April 2013 Scottish First Division | Dumbarton | 0–3 | Livingston | Dumbarton Football Stadium |
| 15:00 | | SFL Report | Lander 32'; Watson 46'; Mullen 77' | Attendance: 705; Referee: Collum |

| 9 April 2013 Scottish First Division | Dumbarton | 1–2 | Raith Rovers | Dumbarton Football Stadium |
| 19:30 | Gilhaney 70' | SFL Report | Spence 14'; Graham 75' | Attendance: 553; Referee: Somers |

| 16 April 2013 Scottish First Division | Falkirk | 1–3 | Dumbarton | Falkirk Stadium |
| 19:45 | Taylor 33' | SFL Report | Gilhaney 19'; Fleming 21', 65' | Attendance: 2,288; Referee: McKendrick |

| 20 April 2013 Scottish First Division | Dumbarton | 4–1 | Airdrie United | Dumbarton Football Stadium |
| 15:00 | Graham 6'; McGinn 43'; McDougall 48'; Agnew 74' | SFL Report | Buchanan 64' | Attendance: 828; Referee: Salmond |

| 27 April 2013 Scottish First Division | Cowdenbeath | 2–3 | Dumbarton | Central Park |
| 15:00 | Moore 15'; Miller 88' | SFL Report | Agnew 35', 44' (pen.); Lister 39' | Attendance: 659; Referee: Finnie |

| 4 May 2013 Scottish First Division | Dumbarton | 0–0 | Partick Thistle | Dumbarton Football Stadium |
| 15:00 | | SFL Report | | Attendance: 1,528; Referee: Beaton |

=== Ramsdens Cup ===
| 28 July 2012 Scottish Challenge Cup round 1 | Dumbarton | 0–1 | Queen of the South | Dumbarton Football Stadium |
| 15:00 | | SFL Report | Clark 69' | Attendance: 684; Referee: Hilland |

=== Scottish Communities League Cup ===
| 4 August 2012 Scottish League Cup round 1 | Dumbarton | 2–0 | Albion Rovers | Dumbarton Football Stadium |
| 15:00 | Prunty 45'; Lister 84' | SFL Report | | Attendance: 479; Referee: Salmond |

| 28 August 2012 Scottish League Cup round 2 | Livingston | 3–2 (a.e.t.) | Dumbarton | Braidwood Motor Company Stadium |
| 19:45 | Russell 39' (Penalty); Barr 96'; Easton 102' | SFL Report | Lister 36'; Gilhaney 110' | Attendance: 493; Referee: Allan |

=== Scottish Cup ===
| 3 November 2012 Scottish Cup round 3 | Dumbarton | 4–1 | East Stirlingshire | Dumbarton Football Stadium |
| 15:00 | Graham 13'; Lister 45'; Prunty 76'; Lithgow 89' | BBC Report | Greenhill 44' | Attendance: 446; Referee: Charleston |

| 1 December 2012 Scottish Cup round 4 | Dumbarton | P–P | Hamilton Academical | Dumbarton Football Stadium |
| 15:00 | | BBC Report |

| 4 December 2012 Scottish Cup round 4 | Dumbarton | P–P | Hamilton Academical | Dumbarton Football Stadium |
| 19:30 | | BBC Report |

| 10 December 2012 Scottish Cup round 4 | Dumbarton | P–P | Hamilton Academical | Dumbarton Football Stadium |
| 19:30 | | BBC Report |

| 12 December 2012 Scottish Cup round 4 | Dumbarton | P–P | Hamilton Academical | Dumbarton Football Stadium |
| 19:30 | | BBC Report |

| 17 December 2012 Scottish Cup round 4 | Dumbarton | 1–3 | Hamilton Academical | Dumbarton Football Stadium |
| 19:30 | Turner 58' (yellow card) 78' (yellow-red card) | BBC Report | Crawford 24'; Devlin 41'; Gillespie 75' | Attendance: 469; Referee: Madden |

=== Stirlingshire Cup ===
| 8 September 2012 Semi Final | Dumbarton | 3–0 | Stirling Albion | Dumbarton Football Stadium |
| | Lister; Lister; Lister 80' | | | Attendance: 200 |

| 23 July 2013 Final | Dumbarton | 3–2 | Falkirk | Dumbarton Football Stadium |
| | Gilhaney 15'; McCallum 31'; Prunty 32' | | Bia-Bi 66'; Blair 68' | Attendance: 323; Referee: Kevin Graham |

== Player statistics ==
=== Captains ===
| No. | P | Name | Country | No. games | Notes |
|---|---|---|---|---|---|
| | DF | Bryan Prunty | (Scotland) | 27 | Club captain |

Last updated: 5 May 2013
Source: Competitive match reports.
Competitive matches only
Matches started as captain only
Country: FIFA nationality; No.: Squad number; P: Position; Name: Player name; No. Games: Number of games started as captain.

=== Squad ===
Last updated 5 May 2013

| No. | Pos | Nat | Player | Total | | First Division | | Challenge Cup | | League Cup | | Scottish Cup | |
| No. | Pos | Nat | Player | Apps | Goals | Apps | Goals | Apps | Goals | Apps | Goals | Apps | Goals |
|---|---|---|---|---|---|---|---|---|---|---|---|---|---|
| | GK | (Scotland) SCO | Jamie Ewings | 16 | 0 | 14+1 | 0 | 0+0 | 0 | 0+0 | 0 | 1+0 | 0 |
| | GK | (Scotland) SCO | Stephen Grindlay | 28 | 0 | 22+2 | 0 | 1+0 | 0 | 2+0 | 0 | 1+0 | 0 |
| | DF | (Scotland) SCO | James Creaney | 27 | 0 | 18+6 | 0 | 1+0 | 0 | 2+0 | 0 | 0+0 | 0 |
| | DF | (Scotland) SCO | Nicky Devlin | 19 | 0 | 15+1 | 0 | 0+0 | 0 | 1+0 | 0 | 2+0 | 0 |
| | DF | (Scotland) SCO | Ross Forsyth | 16 | 0 | 9+6 | 0 | 0+0 | 0 | 0+0 | 0 | 1+0 | 0 |
| | DF | (Scotland) SCO | Andy Graham | 35 | 3 | 30+0 | 2 | 1+0 | 0 | 2+0 | 0 | 2+0 | 1 |
| | DF | (Scotland) SCO | Josh Horne | 1 | 0 | 0+1 | 0 | 0+0 | 0 | 0+0 | 0 | 0+0 | 0 |
| | DF | (Scotland) SCO | Alan Lithgow | 36 | 2 | 29+2 | 1 | 1+0 | 0 | 2+0 | 0 | 2+0 | 1 |
| | DF | (Scotland) SCO | Jamie Lyden | 2 | 0 | 0+1 | 0 | 0+0 | 0 | 1+0 | 0 | 0+0 | 0 |
| | DF | (Scotland) SCO | Jason Marr | 1 | 0 | 0+0 | 0 | 1+0 | 0 | 0+0 | 0 | 0+0 | 0 |
| | DF | (Scotland) SCO | Paul McGinn | 14 | 2 | 14+0 | 2 | 0+0 | 0 | 0+0 | 0 | 0+0 | 0 |
| | DF | (Scotland) SCO | Kevin Nicoll | 0 | 0 | 0+0 | 0 | 0+0 | 0 | 0+0 | 0 | 0+0 | 0 |
| | DF | (Scotland) SCO | Scott Smith | 19 | 0 | 19+0 | 0 | 0+0 | 0 | 0+0 | 0 | 0+0 | 0 |
| | DF | (Scotland) SCO | Stuart Urquhart | 3 | 0 | 3+0 | 0 | 0+0 | 0 | 0+0 | 0 | 0+0 | 0 |
| | MF | (Scotland) SCO | Scott Agnew | 41 | 11 | 33+3 | 11 | 1+0 | 0 | 2+0 | 0 | 2+0 | 0 |
| | MF | (Scotland) SCO | Adam Asghar | 3 | 0 | 1+2 | 0 | 0+0 | 0 | 0+0 | 0 | 0+0 | 0 |
| | MF | (Scotland) SCO | Garry Fleming | 33 | 3 | 26+2 | 3 | 1+0 | 0 | 2+0 | 0 | 2+0 | 0 |
| | MF | (Scotland) SCO | Ross Forbes | 1 | 0 | 1+0 | 0 | 0+0 | 0 | 0+0 | 0 | 0+0 | 0 |
| | MF | (Scotland) SCO | Mark Gilhaney | 38 | 6 | 30+3 | 5 | 1+0 | 0 | 1+1 | 1 | 1+1 | 0 |
| | MF | (Scotland) SCO | Phil Johnston | 13 | 0 | 4+5 | 0 | 0+1 | 0 | 1+1 | 0 | 0+1 | 0 |
| | MF | (Scotland) SCO | Mark Lamont | 27 | 0 | 11+12 | 0 | 0+1 | 0 | 0+1 | 0 | 1+1 | 0 |
| | MF | (Scotland) SCO | Steven McDougall | 35 | 5 | 24+6 | 5 | 1+0 | 0 | 2+0 | 0 | 0+2 | 0 |
| | MF | (Scotland) SCO | Gary McKell | 0 | 0 | 0+0 | 0 | 0+0 | 0 | 0+0 | 0 | 0+0 | 0 |
| | MF | (Scotland) SCO | Martin McNiff | 11 | 0 | 8+1 | 0 | 0+0 | 0 | 0+1 | 0 | 1+0 | 0 |
| | MF | (Scotland) SCO | Ryan Metcalfe | 2 | 0 | 0+2 | 0 | 0+0 | 0 | 0+0 | 0 | 0+0 | 0 |
| | MF | (Scotland) SCO | Nick Phinn | 6 | 0 | 3+3 | 0 | 0+0 | 0 | 0+0 | 0 | 0+0 | 0 |
| | MF | (Scotland) SCO | Reese Pearson | 0 | 0 | 0+0 | 0 | 0+0 | 0 | 0+0 | 0 | 0+0 | 0 |
| | MF | (Scotland) SCO | Glenn Thomson | 1 | 0 | 0+1 | 0 | 0+0 | 0 | 0+0 | 0 | 0+0 | 0 |
| | MF | (Northern Ireland) NIR | Chris Turner | 30 | 3 | 28+0 | 2 | 0+0 | 0 | 0+0 | 0 | 2+0 | 1 |
| | FW | (Scotland) SCO | Jim Lister | 39 | 15 | 30+4 | 12 | 1+0 | 0 | 2+0 | 2 | 2+0 | 1 |
| | FW | (Scotland) SCO | Marc McCusker | 9 | 1 | 1+8 | 1 | 0+0 | 0 | 0+0 | 0 | 0+0 | 0 |
| | FW | (Scotland) SCO | Bryan Prunty | 39 | 13 | 22+12 | 11 | 1+0 | 0 | 2+0 | 1 | 2+0 | 1 |
| | FW | (Scotland) SCO | Owen Ronald | 6 | 0 | 0+6 | 0 | 0+0 | 0 | 0+0 | 0 | 0+0 | 0 |
| | FW | (Scotland) SCO | Patrick Walker | 0 | 0 | 0+0 | 0 | 0+0 | 0 | 0+0 | 0 | 0+0 | 0 |
| | FW | (Scotland) SCO | Robbie Winters | 3 | 0 | 1+2 | 0 | 0+0 | 0 | 0+0 | 0 | 0+0 | 0 |

=== Disciplinary record ===
Includes all competitive matches.

Last updated 5 May 2013

| Nation | Position | Name | First Division | | Challenge Cup | | League Cup | | Scottish Cup | | Total | |
| Nation | Position | Name | Yellow card | Red card | Yellow card | Red card | Yellow card | Red card | Yellow card | Red card | Yellow card | Red card |
| (Scotland) | GK | Jamie Ewings | 1 | 0 | 0 | 0 | 0 | 0 | 0 | 0 | 1 | 0 |
| (Scotland) | GK | Stephen Grindlay | 0 | 1 | 0 | 0 | 0 | 0 | 0 | 0 | 0 | 1 |
| (Scotland) | DF | James Creaney | 5 | 1 | 1 | 0 | 1 | 0 | 0 | 0 | 7 | 1 |
| (Scotland) | DF | Nicky Devlin | 3 | 0 | 0 | 0 | 1 | 0 | 0 | 0 | 4 | 0 |
| (Scotland) | DF | Ross Forsyth | 2 | 0 | 0 | 0 | 0 | 0 | 0 | 0 | 2 | 0 |
| (Scotland) | DF | Andy Graham | 4 | 0 | 0 | 0 | 2 | 0 | 1 | 0 | 7 | 0 |
| (Scotland) | DF | Josh Horne | 0 | 0 | 0 | 0 | 0 | 0 | 0 | 0 | 0 | 0 |
| (Scotland) | DF | Alan Lithgow | 5 | 0 | 0 | 0 | 0 | 0 | 1 | 0 | 6 | 0 |
| (Scotland) | DF | Jamie Lyden | 0 | 0 | 0 | 0 | 0 | 0 | 0 | 0 | 0 | 0 |
| (Scotland) | DF | Paul McGinn | 4 | 0 | 0 | 0 | 0 | 0 | 0 | 0 | 4 | 0 |
| (Scotland) | DF | Kevin Nicoll | 0 | 0 | 0 | 0 | 0 | 0 | 0 | 0 | 0 | 0 |
| (Scotland) | DF | Scott Smith | 3 | 0 | 0 | 0 | 0 | 0 | 0 | 0 | 3 | 0 |
| (Scotland) | DF | Stuart Urquhart | 1 | 0 | 0 | 0 | 0 | 0 | 0 | 0 | 1 | 0 |
| (Scotland) | MF | Scott Agnew | 4 | 0 | 0 | 0 | 1 | 0 | 0 | 0 | 5 | 0 |
| (Scotland) | MF | Adam Asghar | 0 | 0 | 0 | 0 | 0 | 0 | 0 | 0 | 0 | 0 |
| (Scotland) | MF | Ross Forbes | 0 | 0 | 0 | 0 | 0 | 0 | 0 | 0 | 0 | 0 |
| (Scotland) | MF | Garry Fleming | 9 | 0 | 0 | 0 | 0 | 0 | 1 | 0 | 10 | 0 |
| (Scotland) | MF | Mark Gilhaney | 0 | 1 | 0 | 0 | 1 | 0 | 0 | 0 | 1 | 1 |
| (Scotland) | MF | Phil Johnston | 0 | 0 | 0 | 0 | 0 | 0 | 0 | 0 | 0 | 0 |
| (Scotland) | MF | Mark Lamont | 0 | 0 | 0 | 0 | 0 | 0 | 0 | 0 | 0 | 0 |
| (Scotland) | MF | Steven McDougall | 3 | 0 | 0 | 0 | 0 | 0 | 0 | 0 | 3 | 0 |
| (Scotland) | MF | Gary McKell | 0 | 0 | 0 | 0 | 0 | 0 | 0 | 0 | 0 | 0 |
| (Scotland) | MF | Martin McNiff | 2 | 0 | 0 | 0 | 0 | 0 | 0 | 0 | 2 | 0 |
| (Scotland) | MF | Ryan Metcalfe | 0 | 0 | 0 | 0 | 0 | 0 | 0 | 0 | 0 | 0 |
| (Scotland) | MF | Nick Phinn | 0 | 0 | 0 | 0 | 0 | 0 | 0 | 0 | 0 | 0 |
| (Scotland) | MF | Reese Pearson | 0 | 0 | 0 | 0 | 0 | 0 | 0 | 0 | 0 | 0 |
| (Scotland) | MF | Glenn Thomson | 0 | 0 | 0 | 0 | 0 | 0 | 0 | 0 | 0 | 0 |
| (Northern Ireland) | MF | Chris Turner | 8 | 0 | 0 | 0 | 0 | 0 | 3 | 1 | 11 | 1 |
| (Scotland) | FW | Jim Lister | 7 | 0 | 0 | 0 | 0 | 0 | 1 | 0 | 8 | 0 |
| (Scotland) | FW | Marc McCusker | 0 | 0 | 0 | 0 | 0 | 0 | 0 | 0 | 0 | 0 |
| (Scotland) | FW | Bryan Prunty | 3 | 0 | 0 | 0 | 0 | 0 | 0 | 0 | 3 | 0 |
| (Scotland) | FW | Owen Ronald | 0 | 0 | 0 | 0 | 0 | 0 | 0 | 0 | 0 | 0 |
| (Scotland) | FW | Patrick Walker | 0 | 0 | 0 | 0 | 0 | 0 | 0 | 0 | 0 | 0 |
| (Scotland) | FW | Robbie Winters | 0 | 0 | 0 | 0 | 0 | 0 | 0 | 0 | 0 | 0 |

== Team statistics ==
=== League table ===
| Pos | Team | Pld | W | D | L | GF | GA | GD | Pts | Promotion or relegation |
|---|---|---|---|---|---|---|---|---|---|---|
| 5 | Hamilton Academical | 36 | 14 | 9 | 13 | 52 | 45 | +7 | 51 | |
| 6 | Raith Rovers | 36 | 11 | 13 | 12 | 45 | 48 | −3 | 46 | |
| 7 | Dumbarton | 36 | 13 | 4 | 19 | 58 | 83 | −25 | 43 | |
| 8 | Cowdenbeath | 36 | 8 | 12 | 16 | 51 | 65 | −14 | 36 | |
| 9 | Dunfermline Athletic (R) | 36 | 14 | 7 | 15 | 62 | 59 | +3 | 34 (Note: Dunfermline Athletic were deducted 15 points for entering administration.) | Qualification for the First Division Play-offs |

Source: SPFL Archive
Rules for classification: 1) points; 2) goal difference; 3) number of goals scored.
(R) Relegated

=== Division summary ===
| Round | 1 | 2 | 3 | 4 | 5 | 6 | 7 | 8 | 9 | 10 | 11 | 12 | 13 | 14 | 15 | 16 | 17 | 18 | 19 | 20 | 21 | 22 | 23 | 24 | 25 | 26 | 27 | 28 | 29 | 30 | 31 | 32 | 33 | 34 | 35 | 36 |
|---|---|---|---|---|---|---|---|---|---|---|---|---|---|---|---|---|---|---|---|---|---|---|---|---|---|---|---|---|---|---|---|---|---|---|---|---|
| Ground | A | H | A | A | H | H | A | A | H | H | A | H | A | A | A | H | H | A | H | H | A | A | H | H | A | H | A | H | A | A | H | H | A | H | A | H |
| Result | L | L | L | L | L | D | L | D | L | L | W | L | L | W | W | L | W | W | W | L | W | L | L | D | L | L | W | W | W | L | L | L | W | W | W | D |
| Position | 9 | 10 | 10 | 10 | 10 | 10 | 10 | 10 | 10 | 10 | 10 | 10 | 10 | 10 | 10 | 10 | 10 | 10 | 8 | 8 | 8 | 8 | 9 | 9 | 9 | 9 | 9 | 8 | 7 | 8 | 8 | 7 (Note: Dunfermline were deducted 15 points shortly prior to this fixture altering league standings. This was as a result of them entering administration.) | 7 | 7 | 7 | 7 |

Updated to match(es) played on 5 May 2013. Source:
A = Away; H = Home; W = Win; D = Draw; L = Loss

== Transfers ==
=== Players in ===
| Player | From | Fee |
|---|---|---|
| (Scotland) Jim Lister | (Scotland) Brechin City | Free |
| (Scotland) Phil Johnston | (Scotland) Airdrie United | Free |
| (Scotland) Andy Graham | (Scotland) Greenock Morton | Free |
| (Scotland) Ross Forsyth | (Scotland) Greenock Morton | Free |
| (Scotland) Steven McDougall | (Scotland) Dunfermline Athletic | Free |
| (Scotland) Garry Fleming | (Scotland) Irvine Meadow XI | Free |
| (Scotland) Mark Lamont | (Scotland) St Mirren | Loan |
| (Scotland) Nicky Devlin | (Scotland) Motherwell | Loan |
| (Northern Ireland) Chris Turner | (Republic of Ireland) Shamrock Rovers | Free |
| (Scotland) Marc McCusker | (Scotland) Queen of the South | Free |
| (Scotland) Scott Smith | (Scotland) Hibernian | Loan |
| (Scotland) Mark Lamont | (Scotland) St Mirren | Free |
| (Scotland) Paul McGinn | (Scotland) St Mirren | Loan |
| (Scotland) Owen Ronald | (Scotland) Queen's Park | Free |
| (Scotland) Nick Phinn | (Scotland) Stranraer | Free |
| (Scotland) Stuart Urquhart | (Scotland) Rangers | Loan |
| (Scotland) Adam Asghar | (Scotland) Motherwell | Loan |
| (Scotland) Robbie Winters | (Scotland) Peterhead | Free |

=== Players out ===
| Player | To | Fee |
|---|---|---|
| (Scotland) Adam Monaghan | (Scotland) Queen's Park | Free |
| (Scotland) Robert Connelly | Free agent | Free |
| (Scotland) David Gray | (Scotland) Montrose | Free |
| (Scotland) Ryan Borris | (Scotland) Stranraer | Free |
| (Scotland) Paul Nugent | Free agent | Free |
| (Scotland) Graeme Ramage | (Scotland) Annan Athletic | Free |
| (Scotland) Kieran Brannan | (Scotland) Albion Rovers | Free |
| (France) Arlan Kadina Mptata | Free agent | Free |
| (France) Arnaud Gastal | Free agent | Free |
| (Scotland) Tony Wallace | (Scotland) Greenock Morton | Undisclosed |
| (Scotland) Craig Dargo | (Scotland) Dunfermline Athletic | Free |
| (Scotland) Grant Howarth | (Scotland) Beith Juniors | Free |
| (Scotland) Phil Johnston | (Scotland) Stirling Albion | Loan |
| (Scotland) Kevin Nicoll | (Scotland) Clyde | Loan |
| (Scotland) Jamie Lyden | (Scotland) Clyde | Loan |
| (Scotland) Martin McNiff | (Scotland) Annan Athletic | Loan |
| (Scotland) Ross Forsyth | (Scotland) Stirling Albion | Loan |
| (Scotland) Patrick Walker | (Scotland) Albion Rovers | Free |
| (Scotland) Marc McCusker | (Scotland) Clyde | Loan |
| (Scotland) Gary McKell | Free agent | Free |
| (Scotland) Robbie Winters | Free agent | Free |

== Factfile ==
* The League match against Dunfermline Athletic on 23 March marked Mark Gilhaney's 100th appearance for Dumbarton in all national competitions – the 133rd Dumbarton player to reach this milestone.

== See also ==
- List of Dumbarton F.C. seasons
