= Andy Graham =

Scottish footballer (born 1983)

Personal information
- Full name: Andrew Graham
- Date of birth: 22 September 1983 (age 43)
- Place of birth: Glasgow, Scotland
- Height: 6 ft 1 in (1.85 m)

Youth career
- Glasgow Amateurs U21

Senior career*
Years	Team	Apps	(Gls)
2005–2010	Stirling Albion	133	(10)
2010–2011	Hamilton Academical	15	(0)
2011–2012	Greenock Morton	27	(0)
2012–2015	Dumbarton	102	(6)
2015–2016	Ayr United	25	(2)
2016–2026	Alloa Athletic	191	(15)

Managerial career
- 2023–2026: Alloa Athletic
- * Club domestic league appearances and goals as of 19:26, 2 May 2026 (UTC)

Andrew Graham (born 22 September 1983, Glasgow) is a Scottish professional football player and coach who was most recently the player/manager of Scottish League One club Alloa Athletic.

Graham, who played as a defender, started his career as a youth with Glasgow Amateurs, before playing for Stirling Albion, Hamilton Academical, Greenock Morton, Dumbarton, Ayr United and Alloa Athletic, where he entered management in November 2023.

== Career ==
=== Stirling Albion ===
Graham joined Stirling Albion from Glasgow Amateurs U-21 squad. His debut for Stirling Albion was on 30 July 2005, against Ayr United and he scored his first senior club goal on 27 August 2005 against Alloa Athletic. He started his career as a central defender but won the Stirling Albion.com Player of the Year award for the 2009–10 season playing at right back.

=== Hamilton & Morton ===
After his contract with Stirling Albion expired, Graham joined Hamilton Academical for the 2010–11 season, signing on a one-year contract.

Upon reaching the end of his year-long deal at Accies, Graham signed for the club that he supports – Greenock Morton. After breaking his cheekbone in the Renfrewshire Cup final, Graham made his début as a substitute against Dundee on 27 August 2011.

=== Dumbarton ===
After one season at Cappielow, Graham was released and signed for nearby Dumbarton along with teammate Ross Forsyth, where he was made captain He scored his first goal for the club against East Stirlingshire in November 2012. At the end of the 2012–13 season, Graham signed a new one-year contract with Dumbarton. In May 2014 Graham agreed to another new one-year contract. He played in 83 consecutive matches before missing the 3–0 defeat to Hibernian in February 2015 to attend the birth of his daughter, Eilidh.

He made his 100th appearance for the club on the final day of the 2014–15 season in a 2–2 draw with Raith. After winning the club's player of the season accolade he renewed his contract for the 2015–16 season. He was replaced by Darren Barr as club captain in July 2015 and left the club by mutual consent a month later

=== Ayr United ===
On 27 August 2015, Graham signed for Ayr United on a one-year contract. He scored the winning penalty in the Scottish Championship play-off final shoot-out against Stranraer. Shortly after this, he was released by Ayr.

=== Alloa Athletic ===
On 2 June 2016, Graham joined Scottish League One side Alloa Athletic, to be reunited with coach Jack Ross. He became team captain, and then their player/manager in November 2023.

== Career statistics ==
As of match played 2 May 2026

Appearances and goals by club, season and competition
Club	Season	League			Scottish Cup		League Cup		Other		Total	
Club	Season	Division	Apps	Goals	Apps	Goals	Apps	Goals	Apps	Goals	Apps	Goals
Stirling Albion	2005–06	Scottish Second Division	30	2	3	0	2	0	2 (Note: Appearances in the Scottish Challenge Cup)	0	37	2
Stirling Albion	2006–07	Scottish Second Division	15	0	2	0	1	0	1	0	19	0
Stirling Albion	2007–08	Scottish First Division	26	0	1	0	2	0	0	0	29	0
Stirling Albion	2008–09	Scottish Second Division	26	2	1	0	1	1	1	0	29	3
Stirling Albion	2009–10	Scottish Second Division	36	6	4	0	1	0	3	1	44	7
Stirling Albion	Total		133	10	11	0	7	1	7	1	158	12
Hamilton Academical	2010–11	Scottish Premier League	15	0	2	0	0	0	—		17	0
Greenock Morton	2011–12	Scottish First Division	27	0	3	0	0	0	1	0	31	0
Dumbarton	2012–13	Scottish First Division	30	2	2	1	2	0	1	0	35	3
Dumbarton	2013–14	Scottish Championship	36	2	4	0	2	0	1	0	43	2
Dumbarton	2014–15	Scottish Championship	34	2	1	0	2	1	1	0	38	3
Dumbarton	2015–16	Scottish Championship	2	0	0	0	1	0	1	0	4	0
Dumbarton	Total		102	6	7	1	7	1	4	0	120	8
Ayr United	2015–16	Scottish League One	25	2	1	0	0	0	2 (Note: Appearances in the Championship play-offs)	0	28	2
Alloa Athletic	2016–17	Scottish League One	34	4	2	0	6	1	6 (Note: Two appearances in the Scottish Challenge Cup and four in the 2016–17 Championship play-offs)	0	48	5
Alloa Athletic	2017–18	Scottish League One	33	3	2	0	4	0	6 (Note: Two appearances in the Scottish Challenge Cup and four in the 2017–18 Championship play-offs)	0	45	3
Alloa Athletic	2018–19	Scottish Championship	36	3	2	0	4	0	4	0	46	3
Alloa Athletic	2019–20	Scottish Championship	17	0	1	0	4	0	2	0	24	0
Alloa Athletic	2020–21	Scottish Championship	25	1	1	0	4	0	0	0	30	1
Alloa Athletic	2021–22	Scottish League One	25	1	2	0	4	0	1	0	32	1
Alloa Athletic	2022–23	Scottish League One	17	2	2	0	4	0	3	0	26	2
Alloa Athletic	2023–24	Scottish League One	2	0	0	0	1	0	1	0	4	0
Alloa Athletic	2024–25	Scottish League One	1	1	0	0	0	0	0	0	1	1
Alloa Athletic	2025–26	Scottish League One	1	0	0	0	0	0	6	0	7	0
Total			191	15	13	0	31	1	31	0	266	16
Career total			493	33	36	1	45	3	43	1	617	38

== Managerial Record ==
As of match played 14 November 2026

Managerial record by team and tenure
Team	From	To	Record					
Team	From	To	G	W	D	L	Win %	
Alloa Athletic	15 November 2023	16 November 2026	146	59	36	51	40.41	
Career Total			146	59	36	51	40.41	—

== See also ==
- 2011–12 Greenock Morton F.C. season
