= Scott Agnew =

Scottish footballer (born 1987)

Personal information
- Date of birth: 11 July 1987 (age 39)
- Place of birth: Prestwick, South Ayrshire, Scotland
- Position: Attacking midfielder

Team information
- Current team: Stranraer (manager)

Youth career
- 2004–2006: Rangers

Senior career*
Years	Team	Apps	(Gls)
2006–2007	Hamilton Academical	10	(0)
2007–2008	Alloa Athletic	30	(3)
2008–2010	Ayr United	17	(3)
2009–2010	→ Alloa Athletic (loan)	15	(2)
2010	→ Stranraer (loan)	20	(6)
2010–2011	Stranraer	36	(13)
2011–2015	Dumbarton	132	(35)
2015–2016	St Mirren	23	(2)
2016–2018	Stranraer	59	(13)
2018–2021	East Fife	77	(18)
2021–2022	Airdrieonians	31	(0)
2023	East Fife	1	(0)

Managerial career
- 2023–2024: Stranraer
- * Club domestic league appearances and goals

Scott Agnew (born 11 July 1987) is a Scottish football player and coach, who was most recently manager of Stranraer.

Agnew played as an attacking midfielder for Hamilton Academical, Alloa Athletic, Ayr United, Stranraer, Dumbarton, St Mirren, East Fife and Airdrieonians.

He is also one of the co-founders, alongside Steven Dick, of The Fitness Group Education, a fitness education training provider. His business, The Fitness Group Education educates people to gain qualifications in areas like becoming a personal trainer, gym instructor or sports massage therapist.

== Football career ==
=== Early years ===
Born in Prestwick, South Ayrshire, Agnew started his career with Rangers and represented Scotland at youth levels, but he did not make any first team appearances. He moved to Hamilton Academical in 2006, but was released in the summer of 2007. Agnew then joined Alloa Athletic, where he established himself as a first team regular on the left side of midfield and became renowned as a free-kick specialist following his clever free-kicks.

=== Ayr United & Stranraer ===
In May 2008, Agnew joined Ayr United on a two-year contract for an undisclosed fee. Following Ayr's promotion to the First Division at the end of the 2008–09 season, and limited first team opportunities, Agnew joined Alloa Athletic on a six-month loan deal. After returning from his loan spell he was loaned straight back out to Stranraer for the remainder of the 2009–10, before joining them on a permanent basis for the 2010–11 season.

Agnew impressed at Stair Park, scoring 13 goals during the 2010–11 season. This form led to him joining Dumbarton at the end of the season.

=== Dumbarton ===
Agnew joined the club on 27 May 2011, where he became a firm fans favourite and won the club's Player of the Year award for season 2011–12 after scoring 13 goals and registering 20 assists. Agnew scored an impressive 11 goals for Dumbarton in the 2012–13 SFL First Division, all of them coming after Christmas.

In May 2013, Agnew signed a new one-year deal with Ian Murray's men. He renewed his contract for another season a year later. He committed himself for another season with the Sons in May 2015 but later rejected the contract offer to join recently relegated St Mirren.

=== St Mirren & Stranraer return ===
Agnew made his debut for Saints in a 3–1 Scottish Challenge Cup victory over Berwick Rangers on 25 July 2015. The midfielder made an impressive start with his new club, scoring twice in the second half of the match. He was released by St Mirren at the end of the 2015–16 season. He subsequently signed for Scottish League One side Stranraer on a two-year deal, having previously played for the club between 2010 and 2011.

=== East Fife, Airdrieonians & Raith Rovers ===
Agnew joined East Fife in May 2018. After three seasons he left the club by mutual consent in May 2021.

== Coaching career ==
Agnew joined Airdrieonians in 2021, working as both a player and as assistant manager to Ian Murray. He followed Murray to Raith Rovers, but in January 2023 Agnew decided to return to East Fife as a player-coach. He was appointed manager of Stranraer in April 2023.

== Career statistics ==
=== Club ===
As of match played 06 November 2021

Appearances and goals by club, season and competition
Club	Season	League			Scottish Cup		League Cup		Other		Total	
Club	Season	Division	Apps	Goals	Apps	Goals	Apps	Goals	Apps	Goals	Apps	Goals
Hamilton Academical	2005–06	Scottish First Division	5	0	0	0	0	0	0	0	5	0
Hamilton Academical	2006–07	Scottish First Division	5	0	0	0	1	0	0	0	6	0
Hamilton Academical	Total		10	0	0	0	1	0	0	0	11	0
Alloa Athletic	2007–08	Scottish Second Division	30	3	1	0	1	0	3 (Note: One appearance in the Scottish Challenge Cup and two in the First Division play-offs)	0	35	3
Ayr United	2008–09	Scottish Second Division	17	3	1	0	1	0	1 (Note: Appearances in the Scottish Challenge Cup)	0	20	3
Ayr United	2009–10	Scottish First Division	0	0	0	0	0	0	0	0	0	0
Ayr United	Total		17	3	1	0	1	0	1	0	20	3
Alloa Athletic (loan)	2009–10	Scottish Second Division	15	2	1	0	2	0	1	0	19	2
Stranraer (loan)	2009–10	Scottish Third Division	20	6	0	0	0	0	0	0	20	6
Stranraer	2010–11	Scottish Third Division	36	13	5	2	1	0	1	0	43	15
Dumbarton	2011–12	Scottish Second Division	35	13	0	0	1	0	6 (Note: Two appearances in the Scottish Challenge Cup and four in the First Division play-offs)	0	42	13
Dumbarton	2012–13	Scottish First Division	36	11	2	0	2	0	1	0	41	11
Dumbarton	2013–14	Scottish Championship	25	6	3	0	1	0	1	0	30	6
Dumbarton	2014–15	Scottish Championship	36	5	1	0	2	0	1	0	40	5
Dumbarton	Total		132	35	6	0	6	0	9	0	153	35
St Mirren	2015–16	Scottish Championship	23	2	1	0	0	0	4	3	28	5
Stranraer	2016–17	Scottish League One	33	3	2	0	4	0	2	0	41	3
Stranraer	2017–18	Scottish League One	26	10	0	0	4	2	3	1	33	13
Stranraer	Total		59	13	2	0	8	2	5	1	74	16
East Fife	2018–19	Scottish League One	31	7	2	1	2	0	3	1	38	9
East Fife	2019–20	Scottish League One	28	9	1	0	5	2	0	0	34	11
East Fife	2020–21	Scottish League One	18	2	2	2	4	0	0	0	24	4
East Fife	Total		77	18	5	3	11	2	3	1	96	24
Airdrieonians	2021–22	Scottish League One	11	0	0	0	4	0	1	0	16	0
Career Total			430	91	20	3	31	4	28	5	515	109

=== Managerial record ===
As of match played 31 August 2024

Team	From	To	Record				
Team	From	To	G	W	D	L	Win %
Stranraer	17 April 2023	1 September 2024	60	16	14	30	26.67
Total			60	16	14	30	26.67

== Honours ==
Stranraer

- Scottish League Two play-offs: 2023-24
