= Jordan Kirkpatrick =

Scottish footballer (born 1992)

Personal information
- Date of birth: 6 March 1992 (age 34)
- Place of birth: Rutherglen, Scotland
- Position: Midfielder

Youth career
- Hamilton Academical

Senior career*
Years	Team	Apps	(Gls)
2008–2012	Hamilton Academical	20	(0)
2011	→ Brechin City (loan)	14	(0)
2013	Airdrie United	5	(1)
2013–2016	Dumbarton	74	(7)
2016	→ Clyde (loan)	6	(2)
2016–2017	Alloa Athletic	34	(14)
2017–2019	St Mirren	10	(0)
2018	→ Alloa Athletic (loan)	16	(5)
2019	Alloa Athletic	17	(3)
2019–2020	Forfar Athletic	22	(3)
2020–2023	Darvel		
2021	→ Stirling Albion (loan)	7	(0)
2023–2024	Stenhousemuir	18	(1)
- * Club domestic league appearances and goals as of 19:02, 12 February 2025 (UTC)

Jordan Kirkpatrick (born 6 March 1992) is a Scottish professional footballer who plays as a midfielder.

== Career ==
On 26 April 2008, Kirkpatrick made his senior debut for Hamilton Academical versus Dundee. He moved on loan to Brechin City on 31 January 2011. He was given a new one-year contract in March 2012, but was released from the club on 30 December 2012.

On 19 August 2013, after a brief spell with Airdrie United, Kirkpatrick signed for Dumbarton. In March 2016, Kirkpatrick joined Scottish League Two side Clyde on loan until the end of the 2015–16 season. He was told by Dumbarton in May 2016 that he would not be offered a new contract by the club and subsequently signed for recently relegated Alloa Athletic.

After a year with Alloa, Kirkpatrick moved to Scottish Championship club St Mirren on 24 May 2017, signing a two-year contract. He returned to Alloa on loan in January 2018, until the end of the season. After featuring just three times for St Mirren the following season, he returned to Alloa on an 18-month permanent deal in January 2019.

In May 2019, it was announced that Kirkpatrick had joined Scottish League One side Forfar Athletic on a one-year deal.

In June 2020, Kirkpatrick signed for Scottish sixth tier side Darvel. He was loaned to Stirling Albion in March 2021. In January 2023 he scored the only goal as Darvel beat Aberdeen in the Scottish Cup.

In May 2023 he signed for Stenhousemuir.

== Career statistics ==
As of 21 July 2020

Appearances and goals by club, season and competition
Club	Season	League			Scottish Cup		League Cup		Other		Total	
Club	Season	Division	Apps	Goals	Apps	Goals	Apps	Goals	Apps	Goals	Apps	Goals
Hamilton Academical	2007–08	First Division	1	0	0	0	0	0	0	0	1	0
Hamilton Academical	2008–09	Premier League	0	0	0	0	0	0	0	0	0	0
Hamilton Academical	2009–10	Premier League	5	0	0	0	0	0	0	0	5	0
Hamilton Academical	2010–11	Premier League	5	0	0	0	0	0	0	0	5	0
Hamilton Academical	2011–12	First Division	7	0	0	0	0	0	2 (Note: Appearances in the Scottish Challenge Cup)	0	9	0
Hamilton Academical	2012–13	First Division	2	0	0	0	2	0	0	0	4	0
Hamilton Academical	Total		20	0	0	0	2	0	2	0	24	0
Brechin City (loan)	2010–11	Second Division	14	0	0	0	0	0	4 (Note: Appearances in the First Division play-offs)	1	18	1
Airdrie United	2012–13	First Division	5	1	0	0	0	0	0	0	5	1
Dumbarton	2013–14	Championship	32	5	4	2	0	0	0	0	36	7
Dumbarton	2014–15	Championship	20	2	0	0	2	0	1	1	23	3
Dumbarton	2015–16	Championship	22	0	3	2	1	0	1	0	27	2
Dumbarton	Total		74	7	7	4	3	0	2	1	86	12
Clyde (loan)	2015–16	League Two	6	2	0	0	0	0	4 (Note: Appearances in the League One play-offs)	1	10	3
Alloa Athletic	2016–17	League One	34	14	2	0	6	2	7 (Note: Three appearances and a goal in the Scottish Challenge Cup, four appearances in the Championship play-offs)	1	49	17
St Mirren	2017–18	Championship	8 (Note: Kirkpatrick only made 8 league appearances for St Mirren in this season. Soccerbase records show he appeared as a substitute vs. Dunfermline Athletic on 16 December 2017, but he never played in this match. Match reports from all major news outlets confirm this.)	0	0	0	4	0	2	0	14	0
St Mirren	2018–19	Premiership	2	0	0	0	1	0	0	0	3	0
St Mirren	Total		10	0	0	0	5	0	2	0	17	0
Alloa Athletic (loan)	2017–18	League One	16	5	1	0	0	0	4 (Note: Appearances in the Championship play-offs)	2	21	7
Alloa Athletic	2018–19	Championship	17	3	0	0	0	0	0	0	17	3
Forfar Athletic	2019–20	League One	22	3	0	0	1	0	0	0	23	3
Career total			218	35	10	4	16	2	23	5	270	47

== Honours ==
=== Individual ===
- Scottish League One Player of the Month (1): August 2016
