= Adam Asghar =

Scottish footballer

Personal information
- Date of birth: 26 July 1994 (age 32)
- Place of birth: Glasgow, Scotland
- Position: Midfielder

Team information
- Current team: Southampton (Under-21 lead coach)

Senior career*
Years	Team	Apps	(Gls)
2012–2013	Motherwell	0	(0)
2013	→ Dumbarton (loan)	3	(0)
2014–2016	Alloa Athletic	6	(0)
2015	→ East Stirlingshire (loan)	2	(0)
2016–2017	Annan Athletic	11	(1)
2018–2019	Clydebank	?	(?)
- * Club domestic league appearances and goals as of 19:37, 24 January 2017 (UTC)

Adam Asghar (born 26 July 1994) is a Scottish football coach and former player who is currently U-21 lead coach at Championship side Southampton.

As a player, Asghar had spells with Motherwell, Alloa Athletic, Annan Athletic and Clydebank, as well as Dumbarton and East Stirlingshire on loan.

== Early life ==
Asghar was born in Glasgow on 26 July 1994. He is of partial Pakistani descent through his father, Tony Asghar, who was a youth footballer at Rangers in the 1980s before becoming a police officer and football agent. His mother is an ethnic Scot.

== Playing career ==
A product of the Motherwell youth system, Asghar was a regular for the under-20 side in the 2012-13 season. On 29 March 2013, Asghar joined Scottish First Division side Dumbarton on loan till the end of the season. On 20 May 2013, it was confirmed that Asghar would not have his Motherwell contract extended, making him a free agent. In September 2013, he went on trial at Greenock Morton, playing in reserve matches against East Stirlingshire and Dundee.

He signed for Alloa Athletic in July 2014. On 4 March 2015, Asghar signed for East Stirlingshire on a one-month loan.

Ashgar left Alloa at the end of the 2015–16 season, signing for Annan Athletic in July 2016. He left Annan in the 2017 close season. After a spell playing and coaching in the United States, he joined junior club Clydebank as a trialist December 2017, prior to officially registering with the club at the beginning of 2018. He was unable to remain regularly committed in the 2018–19 season due to changed work commitments, and subsequently left the club.

== Coaching career ==
Asghar holds a UEFA Elite Youth A coaching licence. He worked as a coach with Motherwell's under-16 and under-18 teams, and for the Scottish Football Association's Performance School programme at Braidhurst High School. In March 2019, he became senior academy head coach at Dundee United, where his father Tony Asghar was already sporting director.

In October 2022, he moved to Championship side Sunderland as lead coach of the U-18 team.

In October 2023, he left Sunderland to join Southampton as manager of the U-21 team.

== Career statistics ==
As of 20 April 2015

Club	Season	League		Cup		League Cup		Other		Total	
Club	Season	Apps	Goals	Apps	Goals	Apps	Goals	Apps	Goals	Apps	Goals
Motherwell	2012–13	0	0	0	0	0	0	0	0	0	0
Dumbarton (loan)	2012–13	3	0	0	0	0	0	0	0	3	0
Alloa Athletic	2014–15	1	0	1	0	1	0	2	0	5	0
East Stirlingshire (loan)	2014–15	2	0	0	0	0	0	0	0	2	0
Total		6	0	1	0	1	0	2	0	10	0

== See also ==
- British Asians in association football
