= Alan Lithgow =

Scottish footballer

Personal information
- Date of birth: 12 March 1988 (age 38)
- Place of birth: Bellshill, Scotland
- Position: Defender

Team information
- Current team: St Cadoc's

Youth career
- East Kilbride Burgh
- 2004–2005: Heart of Midlothian

Senior career*
| Years | Team | Apps | (Gls) |
| 2005–2008 | Heart of Midlothian | 0 | (0) |
| 2008 | → Stirling Albion (loan) | 3 | (0) |
| 2008–2011 | Clyde | 76 | (8) |
| 2011–2013 | Dumbarton | 63 | (5) |
| 2013–2014 | Ayr United | 34 | (0) |
| 2014–2015 | Stenhousemuir | 34 | (1) |
| 2015–2016 | Airdrieonians | 36 | (4) |
| 2016–2021 | Livingston | 113 | (10) |
| 2021–2023 | Greenock Morton | 37 | (1) |
| 2023 | East Kilbride | 43 | (27) |
| 2023– | St Cadoc's | 1 | (9) |

International career
| 2006–2007 | Scotland U19 | 3 | (0) |
- * Club domestic league appearances and goals as of 14:18, 30 January 2023 (UTC)

Alan Lithgow (born 12 March 1988) is a Scottish professional association football player who plays for St Cadoc's.

== Career ==
Born in Bellshill, Lithgow began his professional career with Heart of Midlothian, joining from youth side East Kilbride Burgh in 2004.

Lithgow made his competitive debut for Hearts in a 4–0 League Cup win over Alloa Athletic in September 2006, appearing as a second-half substitute for the injured Hristos Karipidis. This was not, however, Lithgow's first involvement with the first team squad: he was an unused substitute on his 17th birthday back in the 2004–05 season, when a flu epidemic forced the Edinburgh club to promote numerous members of their under-19 side to the first team squad for a match with Inverness Caledonian Thistle.

He made three appearances for Stirling Albion in a loan spell during the latter part of the 2007–08 season.

He was released by Hearts in August 2008. He trained with Clyde, and appeared in reserve team matches, before signing a short-term deal until the end of the year on 29 October 2008. He made his Clyde debut in a 2–2 draw with St Johnstone in November 2008. Lithgow's contract was terminated in June 2009, following Clyde's relegation and financial troubles, however, in July 2009, he signed a new one-month contract with the club. Lithgow was in fine form for Clyde during the season, and ended the campaign winning three Player of the Year awards. Following relegation to the Third Division, Lithgow turned down the offer of a new contract, and left the club in May 2010. Despite a trial with Greenock Morton, he was not offered a full-time contract and returned to Clyde for the 2010–11 season. He rejected the offer of a new contract in May 2011, and left the club again.

On 21 June 2011, Lithgow signed a contract with Dumbarton, in two seasons he made 63 league appearances and scored a total of five goals for the club.

In the summer of 2013 he signed for Ayr United. In 2014, Lithgow signed for Stenhousemuir, staying with the side for one season before joining Scottish League One rivals Airdrieonians in June 2015.

On 16 May 2016, Lithgow joined Scottish League One side Livingston. He helped Livingston reach the Scottish Premiership by winning successive promotions in 2016–17 and 2017–18. During the 2019–20 season he suffered a hip injury that subsequently required surgery.

Lithgow signed for East Kilbride in February 2023.

== Career statistics ==
As of match played 21 April 2021

Appearances and goals by club, season and competition
| Club | Season | League | | | Scottish Cup | | League Cup | | Other | | Total | |
| Club | Season | Division | Apps | Goals | Apps | Goals | Apps | Goals | Apps | Goals | Apps | Goals |
|---|---|---|---|---|---|---|---|---|---|---|---|---|
| Heart of Midlothian | 2006–07 | Scottish Premier League | 0 | 0 | 0 | 0 | 1 | 0 | – | | 1 | 0 |
| Heart of Midlothian | 2007–08 | Scottish Premier League | 0 | 0 | 0 | 0 | 0 | 0 | – | | 0 | 0 |
| Heart of Midlothian | Total | | 0 | 0 | 0 | 0 | 1 | 0 | 0 | 0 | 1 | 0 |
| Stirling Albion (loan) | 2007–08 | Scottish First Division | 3 | 0 | 0 | 0 | 0 | 0 | 0 | 0 | 3 | 0 |
| Clyde | 2008–09 | Scottish First Division | 22 | 1 | 2 | 0 | 0 | 0 | 0 | 0 | 24 | 1 |
| Clyde | 2009–10 | Scottish Second Division | 32 | 4 | 2 | 2 | 1 | 0 | 1 (Note: Appearances in the Scottish Challenge Cup) | 0 | 36 | 6 |
| Clyde | 2010–11 | Scottish Third Division | 22 | 3 | 0 | 0 | 1 | 0 | 0 | 0 | 23 | 3 |
| Clyde | Total | | 76 | 8 | 4 | 2 | 2 | 0 | 1 | 0 | 83 | 10 |
| Dumbarton | 2011–12 | Scottish Second Division | 32 | 4 | 0 | 0 | 1 | 0 | 6 (Note: Two appearances in the Scottish Challenge Cup; Four appearances in the Scottish First Division play-offs) | 0 | 39 | 4 |
| Dumbarton | 2012–13 | Scottish First Division | 31 | 1 | 2 | 1 | 2 | 0 | 1 | 0 | 36 | 2 |
| Dumbarton | Total | | 63 | 5 | 2 | 1 | 3 | 0 | 7 | 0 | 75 | 6 |
| Ayr United | 2013–14 | Scottish League One | 34 | 0 | 3 | 1 | 1 | 0 | 4 (Note: Two appearances in the Scottish Challenge Cup and two in the Championship play-offs) | 0 | 42 | 1 |
| Stenhousemuir | 2014–15 | Scottish League One | 34 | 1 | 1 | 0 | 2 | 1 | 5 (Note: One appearance in the Scottish Challenge Cup; four appearances and a goal in the League One play-offs) | 1 | 42 | 3 |
| Airdrieonians | 2015–16 | Scottish League One | 36 | 4 | 2 | 0 | 2 | 0 | 1 | 0 | 41 | 4 |
| Livingston | 2016–17 | Scottish League One | 31 | 0 | 2 | 0 | 4 | 0 | 4 | 0 | 41 | 0 |
| Livingston | 2017–18 | Scottish Championship | 33 | 6 | 2 | 0 | 6 | 1 | 6 (Note: Two appearances in the Scottish Challenge Cup; Four appearances in the Scottish Premiership play-offs) | 1 | 47 | 8 |
| Livingston | 2018–19 | Scottish Premiership | 35 | 2 | 1 | 0 | 2 | 0 | — | | 38 | 2 |
| Livingston | 2019–20 | Scottish Premiership | 12 | 2 | 0 | 0 | 5 | 1 | — | | 17 | 3 |
| Livingston | 2020–21 | Scottish Premiership | 2 | 0 | 1 | 0 | 0 | 0 | — | | 3 | 0 |
| Livingston | Total | | 113 | 10 | 6 | 0 | 17 | 2 | 10 | 1 | 146 | 13 |
| Career total | | | 359 | 28 | 18 | 4 | 28 | 3 | 28 | 2 | 433 | 37 |

== Personal life ==
In December 2008, Lithgow's name was placed on the sex offenders' register for offences which took place in August and October 2007. The charges were related to Lithgow exposing himself and performing indecent acts to women on four separate occasions in Airdrie and Edinburgh. In January 2009, Lithgow avoided a custodial sentence after admitting to the charges against him, however, he was put on probation for three years and ordered to carry out 240 hours of community service.

Officers had determined that Lithgow, who was working as a delivery driver at the time, was unfit to drive after being stopped near Inveraray on October 15, 2024.

Lithgow, of Blantyre, also failed to provide a specimen of blood to ascertain his ability to drive when asked to report to the police station in Lochgilphead.

He was fined £420 and was banned from driving for 12-months.

== Honours ==
Livingston

- Scottish League One: 2016–17
