= Paul McGinn =

Scottish footballer (born 1990)

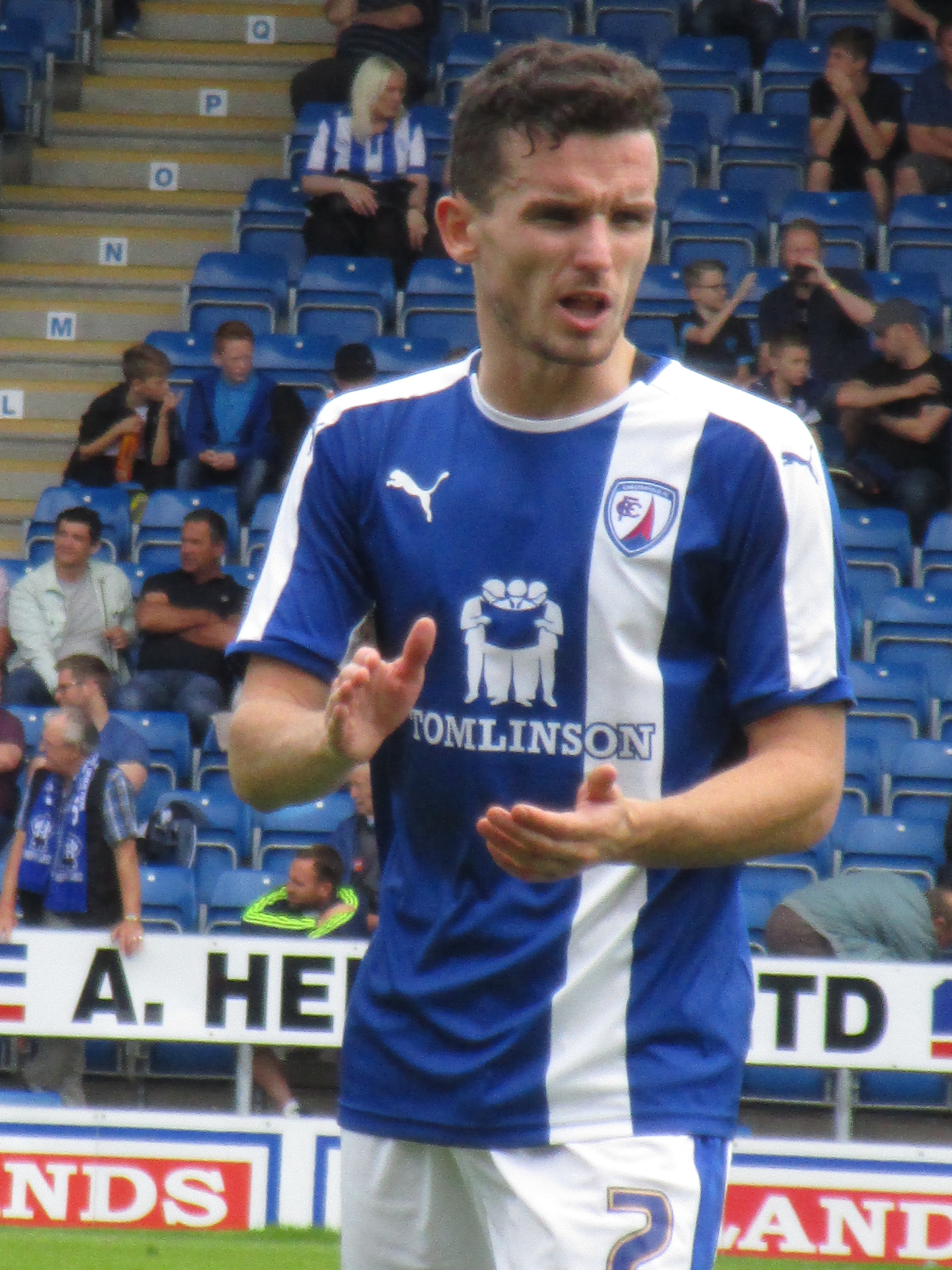
- McGinn playing for Chesterfield in July 2016.

Personal information
- Date of birth: 22 October 1990 (age 36)
- Place of birth: Glasgow, Scotland
- Height: 1.75 m (5 ft 9 in)
- Position: Right-back

Team information
- Current team: Motherwell
- Number: 16

Youth career
- Queen's Park

Senior career*
Years	Team	Apps	(Gls)
2009–2012	Queen's Park	58	(1)
2012–2013	St Mirren	0	(0)
2012–2013	→ Queen's Park (loan)	8	(1)
2013	→ Dumbarton (loan)	14	(2)
2013–2014	Dumbarton	35	(0)
2014–2016	Dundee	68	(1)
2016–2017	Chesterfield	18	(1)
2017–2018	Partick Thistle	26	(0)
2018–2020	St Mirren	57	(3)
2020–2022	Hibernian	70	(6)
2022–	Motherwell	110	(2)

International career^{‡}
2021–	Scotland	1	(0)
- * Club domestic league appearances and goals as of 20 May 2026 ‡ National team caps and goals as of 22:37, 7 September 2021 (UTC)

Paul McGinn (born 22 October 1990) is a Scottish footballer who plays as a right-back for Scottish Premiership club Motherwell, whom he captains, and for the Scotland national team.

Starting his career at Queen's Park in the youth team, McGinn has spent the majority of his career playing in Scotland. After leaving Queen's Park in 2012, he played for St Mirren, Dumbarton, Dundee, Partick Thistle and Hibernian, as well as a stint at English club Chesterfield, before joining Motherwell in 2022. He made his Scotland debut in 2021.

== Career ==
=== Queen's Park ===
Raised in Clydebank, McGinn started his career as a youth player at Queen's Park. He made his debut on 2 May 2009, in Queen's Park's 1–0 defeat to Raith Rovers. Having come on as a substitute, he was sent off in the 90th minute.

=== St Mirren ===
On 18 September 2012, McGinn signed for Scottish Premier League side St Mirren until the end of the season, despite interest from Aberdeen and Dundee United. On 24 November 2012, he went out on loan to former his club Queen's Park. The loan was necessary to give him game time, as he was registered as an amateur and unable to play in the SPL until January. He then finished the season on loan to Dumbarton. Despite being offered a new contract, McGinn opted to leave St Mirren at the end of the season.

=== Dumbarton ===
After his successful loan spell, on 4 June 2013, McGinn agreed a one-year deal with Dumbarton. In all he made 42 appearances in all competitions that season as the side finished fifth in the Scottish Championship. McGinn was also named as part of the 2013–14 PFA Scotland Scottish Championship Team of the Year.

=== Dundee ===
On 20 June 2014, McGinn was persuaded by Dundee manager Paul Hartley to sign a two-year contract alongside former St Mirren teammate Paul McGowan. He made his debut on 2 August 2014, as Dundee beat Peterhead 4–0 in the Scottish League Cup.

=== Chesterfield ===
On 22 June 2016, McGinn signed a two-year contract with English club Chesterfield after his Dundee contract expired. He scored his first goal for Chesterfield in a 3–1 EFL Cup loss against Rochdale on 9 August 2016. On 25 August 2017 he left the club, with his contract being cancelled by mutual consent.

=== Partick Thistle ===
McGinn returned to Scottish football on 31 August 2017, signing a one-year contract with Partick Thistle. Thistle were relegated from the Scottish Premiership, via the playoffs, in his only season with the club.

=== St Mirren (second spell) ===
McGinn returned to St Mirren in May 2018, signing a two-year contract. He agreed a deal with the club while the manager position was vacant; Alan Stubbs took over in June 2018.

=== Hibernian ===
McGinn signed an 18-month contract with Hibernian on 31 January 2020, moving from St Mirren for an undisclosed transfer fee. He was added to the Scotland international squad in October 2020, after six players dropped out of the initial selection due to injuries and COVID-19. On the same day as his international selection, McGinn agreed an extended contract with Hibernian. McGinn scored his first goals for Hibs, and his first since April 2019, when he scored twice in a 2–2 draw with St Johnstone on 24 November.

On 18 September 2021, McGinn scored against his former club St Mirren during a 2–2 draw. His appearances for Hibs during the 2021–22 season triggered a one-year extension to his contract, but he was allowed to leave by mutual consent soon afterwards.

=== Motherwell ===
After leaving Hibs, McGinn signed a one-year contract with Motherwell.

On 24 May 2024, McGinn extended his contract with Motherwell until the summer of 2025. On 9 May 2025, Motherwell announced that McGinn had extended his contract until the end of the 2025/26 season. On 1 January 2026, McGinn again extended his contract with Motherwell, this time until the summer of 2027.

== International career ==
In October 2020, McGinn received his first national team call-up from Scotland, but he failed to make an appearance.

On 6 September 2021, McGinn was called up for Scotland for a second time following three players' withdrawal from the squad. On 7 September, McGinn came off the bench to make his international debut against Austria in Vienna, where Scotland won 1–0. His brother John was already on the field, and they became only the third siblings to play together for the national team since the end of World War II. It was also the first occasion that he and Scotland captain Andy Robertson had played together since their time in the fourth tier of Scottish football with Queen's Park eight years earlier.

== Personal life ==
Paul's older brother Stephen and younger brother John are also footballers. Stephen is a coach with St Mirren while John plays for Aston Villa. All three brothers have played for St Mirren and Hibernian during their careers. Their grandfather Jack McGinn was a Celtic chairman and Scottish Football Association president.

== Career statistics ==
As of match played 2 May 2026

Appearances and goals by club, season and competition
Club	Season	League			National Cup		League Cup		Other		Total	
Club	Season	Division	Apps	Goals	Apps	Goals	Apps	Goals	Apps	Goals	Apps	Goals
Queen's Park	2008–09	Scottish Second Division	1	0	0	0	0	0	0	0	1	0
Queen's Park	2009–10	Scottish Third Division	6	0	0	0	0	0	0	0	6	0
Queen's Park	2010–11	Scottish Third Division	26	1	1	0	0	0	2 (Note: Appearances in the Second Division play-offs)	0	29	1
Queen's Park	2011–12	Scottish Third Division	34	0	4	0	1	0	3 (Note: One appearance in the Scottish Challenge Cup and two in the Second Division play-offs)	0	42	0
Queen's Park	Total		67	1	5	0	1	0	5	0	78	1
St Mirren	2012–13	Scottish Premier League	0	0	0	0	0	0	0	0	0	0
Queen's Park (loan)	2012–13	Scottish Third Division	8	1	0	0	0	0	0	0	8	1
Dumbarton (loan)	2012–13	Scottish Championship	14	2	0	0	0	0	0	0	14	2
Dumbarton	2013–14	Scottish Championship	35	0	4	0	2	0	1 (Note: Appearance in the Scottish Challenge Cup)	0	42	0
Dundee	2014–15	Scottish Premiership	34	1	2	0	3	1	0	0	39	2
Dundee	2015–16	Scottish Premiership	34	0	4	1	1	0	0	0	39	1
Dundee	Total		68	1	6	1	4	1	0	0	78	3
Chesterfield	2016–17	League One	18	1	0	0	1	1	0	0	19	2
Partick Thistle	2017–18	Scottish Premiership	26	0	2	0	1	0	2 (Note: Two appearances in the Scottish Premiership play-offs)	0	31	0
St Mirren	2018–19	Scottish Premiership	35	3	2	0	5	0	2 (Note: Two appearances in the Scottish Premiership play-offs)	0	44	3
St Mirren	2019–20	Scottish Premiership	22	0	0	0	4	0	0	0	26	0
St Mirren	Total		57	3	2	0	9	0	0	0	70	3
Hibernian	2019–20 (Note: One appearance in the 2019–20 Scottish Cup was in a match delayed until October 2020 due to the COVID-19 pandemic.)	Scottish Premiership	7	0	3	0	0	0	0	0	10	0
Hibernian	2020–21	Scottish Premiership	38	3	5	0	4	0	0	0	47	3
Hibernian	2021–22	Scottish Premiership	25	3	1	0	4	0	4 (Note: Appearances in the UEFA Conference League)	0	34	3
Hibernian	Total		70	6	9	0	8	0	4	0	91	6
Motherwell	2022–23	Scottish Premiership	36	0	2	0	2	0	2	0	42	0
Motherwell	2023–24	Scottish Premiership	31	1	2	0	5	0	0	0	38	1
Motherwell	2024–25	Scottish Premiership	10	1	0	0	2	0	0	0	12	1
Motherwell	2025–26	Scottish Premiership	33	0	1	0	4	0	0	0	38	0
Motherwell	Total		110	2	5	0	13	0	2	0	114	2
Career total			473	17	33	1	39	2	16	0	571	20

=== International ===
Appearances and goals by national team and year
National team	Year	Apps	Goals
Scotland	2021	1	0
Total		1	0
