= Mark Lamont =

Scottish footballer

Personal information
- Date of birth: 4 February 1993 (age 33)
- Place of birth: Paisley, Scotland
- Position: Midfielder

Youth career
- St Mirren

Senior career*
Years	Team	Apps	(Gls)
2011–13	St Mirren	1	(0)
2012	→ Dumbarton (loan)	12	(0)
2012–13	→ Dumbarton (loan)	14	(0)
2013	Dumbarton	9	(0)
2014	Albion Rovers	1	(0)
2014–2015	Petershill	?	(?)
2015–2016	Stirling Albion	23	(1)
2016–2018	East Fife	40	(5)
2018–2019	Stranraer	22	(1)
2021	Dumbarton	0	(0)

International career^{‡}
2011	Scotland U19	2	(0)
- * Club domestic league appearances and goals as of 17:18, 14 May 2023 (UTC) ‡ National team caps and goals as of 07:07, 19 July 2021 (UTC)

Mark Lamont (born 4 February 1993) is a Scottish former footballer. He previously played for St Mirren, Dumbarton, Petershill, Stirling Albion, East Fife and Stranraer. Lamont, who is a midfielder, has also played for his country at youth international level.

== Career ==
=== St Mirren ===
Lamont who was born in Paisley, Scotland started his career as part of St Mirren's under-19 squad. He made senior debut on 26 February 2011 as a substitute for Craig Dargo in 2–0 defeat against Kilmarnock in a Scottish Premier League fixture. Soon after his debut he was selected for a Scotland Under-19 squad. Lamont was sent on loan to Dumbarton on the opening day of 2012 winter transfer window to gain more first team experience following an ankle injury he had sustained from the previous season. Having returned from his loan spell with Dumbarton he signed a new contract with St Mirren keeping him at the club until January 2013, before being loaned out again. He returned from his loan on 3 January 2013 and was subsequently released by his parent club.

=== Dumbarton ===
On 1 January 2012, he joined Scottish Second Division side Dumbarton until the end of the 2011–12 season. He made his debut for Dumbarton the following day in 3–2 victory against Arbroath. Lamont suffered an achilles injury in early March against Cowdenbeath. Despite manager Alan Adamson ruling him for rest of the season, he returned for the Scottish First Division play-off final first leg. He played again in the second leg, with Dumbarton securing promotion 6–2 on aggregate. Lamont rejoined the now First Division side, on loan at the start of the 2012–13 season. His loan expired in January and he returned to St Mirren whom released him. After becoming a free agent he rejoined Dumbarton on a permanent basis becoming Ian Murray's third signing as manager. Lamont would continue to have injury struggles. Having procured a seventh-place finish with Dumbarton in First Division, Lamont was released and later retired.

Lamont made a trial appearance for Albion Rovers in March 2014 and went on to join Junior side Petershill in the summer of that year.

=== Stirling Albion, East Fife and Stranraer ===
On 15 September 2015, after having spent 2 years away from professional football Lamont signed for Scottish League Two club Stirling Albion, having already played for the side as a trialist against East Stirlingshire. On 5 December 2015 Lamont scored a goal in a match against Elgin City. This made the score 1–1 in a match that Stirling Albion went on to win. He was released at the end of the 2015–16 season and subsequently signed for East Fife in June 2016. After two seasons at East Fife he joined Stranraer.

=== Dumbarton return ===
After two years out of football, Lamont returned to Dumbarton in July 2021 – linking up with former boss at Stranraer, Stephen Farrell. However he made just one appearance for the club, as a substitute against Partick Thistle (in the League Cup), before stepping away from football once again and leaving the club permanently in May 2022.

=== International career ===
Lamont has represented Scotland at Under-19 level on two occasions both of which were against Denmark.

== Career statistics ==
As of match played 4 May 2019

Appearances and goals by club, season and competition
Club	Season	League			Scottish Cup		League Cup		Other		Total	
Club	Season	Division	Apps	Goals	Apps	Goals	Apps	Goals	Apps	Goals	Apps	Goals
St Mirren	2010–11	Premier League	1	0	0	0	0	0	0	0	1	0
St Mirren	2011–12	Premier League	0	0	0	0	2	0	0	0	2	0
St Mirren	2012–13	Premier League	0	0	0	0	0	0	0	0	0	0
St Mirren	Total		0	0	0	0	0	0	0	0	3	0
Dumbarton (loan)	2011–12	Second Division	12	0	0	0	0	0	2 (Note: Appearances in the First Division play-offs)	0	14	0
Dumbarton (loan)	2012–13	First Division	14	0	2	0	1	0	1 (Note: Appearances in the Scottish Challenge Cup)	0	18	0
Dumbarton	2012–13	First Division	9	0	0	0	0	0	0	0	9	0
Dumbarton	Total		35	0	2	0	1	0	3	0	41	0
Albion Rovers	2013–14	League Two	1	0	0	0	0	0	0	0	1	0
Stirling Albion	2015–16	League Two	23	1	5	0	0	0	0	0	28	1
East Fife	2016–17	League One	19	1	3	0	4	0	2	0	28	1
East Fife	2017–18	League One	21	5	2	0	0	0	1	0	24	5
East Fife	Total		40	6	5	0	4	0	3	0	52	6
Stranraer	2018–19	League One	22	1	2	0	1	0	4	0	29	1
Dumbarton	2021–22	Scottish League One	0	0	0	0	1	0	0	0	1	0
Career total			121	7	14	0	9	0	10	0	155	8
