= Danny Denholm =

Scottish footballer

Personal information
- Full name: Daniel Denholm
- Date of birth: 26 August 1990 (age 36)
- Place of birth: Edinburgh, Scotland
- Height: 1.83 m (6 ft 0 in)
- Position: Winger

Youth career
- Dunedin Boys Club
- Heart of Midlothian
- 2005–2007: Roseburn Boys Club
- 2007–2009: Edinburgh City

Senior career*
Years	Team	Apps	(Gls)
2009–2010	Edinburgh City		
2010–2012	Stirling University		
2012–2013	Forfar Athletic	28	(9)
2013–2014	Livingston	27	(1)
2014–2017	Forfar Athletic	100	(26)
2017–2019	Arbroath	63	(12)
2019–2022	East Fife	71	(13)
2022–2023	Stirling Albion	30	(2)
2023–2025	The Spartans	37	(1)
2025	→ Forfar Athletic (loan)	8	(0)
Total		364	(64)
- * Club domestic league appearances and goals as of 13:51, 10 June 2025 (UTC)

Daniel Denholm (born 26 August 1990) is a Scottish former footballer who played as a winger. He played for one season with Livingston and in lower divisions with Forfar Athletic, East Fife, Stirling Albion and Arbroath.

== Career ==
Born and raised in Edinburgh where he attended Broughton High School and was a supporter of Heart of Midlothian as a child, Denholm began his footballing career at Edinburgh City, playing for their senior team in the 2009–10 season including in the early rounds of the Scottish Cup. He left in the summer of 2010, signing with Stirling University, where he was already studying for a degree. He was a part of the side which won the East of Scotland Football League, also being selected for the Scottish Universities team.

In July 2012 Denholm signed with Scottish Football League club Forfar Athletic, managed by Dick Campbell. He made his debut for the club on 28 July, starting and scoring in a 3–2 home win over Dunfermline, in the season's Scottish Challenge Cup. He finished the season with 32 appearances and 10 goals.

On 29 May 2013, he signed with Scottish Championship club Livingston. He made his debut for the club on 3 August, in a 3–1 away win over Elgin City, and scored his first goal two weeks later, in a 3–3 home draw against Queen of the South. After thirty appearances and two goals in what he later described as an unhappy year, Denholm left Livingston in May 2014 to rejoin his first senior side Forfar Athletic.

Denholm spent three seasons with Forfar before signing a two-year deal with their Angus rivals Arbroath on 1 June 2017, reuniting with Dick Campbell as manager. After achieving promotion in his second campaign with Arbroath by winning the 2018–19 Scottish League One title, Denholm remained at the same level when he signed for East Fife in summer 2019.

Denholm signed for Stirling Albion in May 2022.

Following the conclusion of the 2024–25 season, Denholm announced his retirement from football.

== Personal life and media work ==
Denholm achieved a degree in Sports Studies at the University of Stirling, being accepted on an International Sports Scholarship to combine football with his studies for the final two years of the course; he trained to become a physical education teacher, taking up full-time roles when his professional contract at Livingston ended, working at schools in Edinburgh and Fife Especially in Dunfermline Where he taught for a year.

He began writing an online blog, Lower League Ramblings, in 2018 while playing for Arbroath; BBC Sport later invited him to write an occasional Part-time Player column on the same theme for the Scottish Football section of their website.

== Career statistics ==
As of 12:53, 31 July 2019 (UTC)

Appearances and goals by club, season and competition
Club	Season	League			Scottish Cup		League Cup		Other		Total	
Club	Season	Division	Apps	Goals	Apps	Goals	Apps	Goals	Apps	Goals	Apps	Goals
Forfar Athletic	2012–13	Second Division	28	9	1	0	1	0	2 (Note: Appearances in the Scottish Challenge Cup)	1	32	10
Livingston	2013–14	Championship	27	1	1	0	3	1	0	0	31	2
Forfar Athletic	2014–15	League One	33	6	1	0	1	2	5 (Note: One appearance in the 2014–15 Scottish Challenge Cup and four in the Championship promotion play-offs)	0	40	8
Forfar Athletic	2015–16	League One	33	8	4	1	2	1	2	0	41	10
Forfar Athletic	2016–17	League Two	34	12	2	0	3	0	7 (Note: Three appearances in the 2016–17 Scottish Challenge Cup; four appearances and two goals in the promotion to League One play-offs)	2	46	14
Forfar Athletic	Total		100	26	7	1	6	3	14	2	127	32
Arbroath	2017–18	League One	33	10	2	0	4	2	3 (Note: One appearance in the 2017–18 Scottish Challenge Cup; two appearances in the promotion to Championship play-offs)	0	42	12
Arbroath	2018–19	League One	30	2	1	0	4	0	3	1	38	3
Arbroath	Total		63	12	3	0	8	2	6	1	70	15
East Fife	2019–20	League One	0	0	0	0	3	0	0	0	3	0
Career total			218	46	12	1	21	6	22	4	273	59
