= Jack Ross (footballer, born 1976) =

Scottish footballer (born 1976)

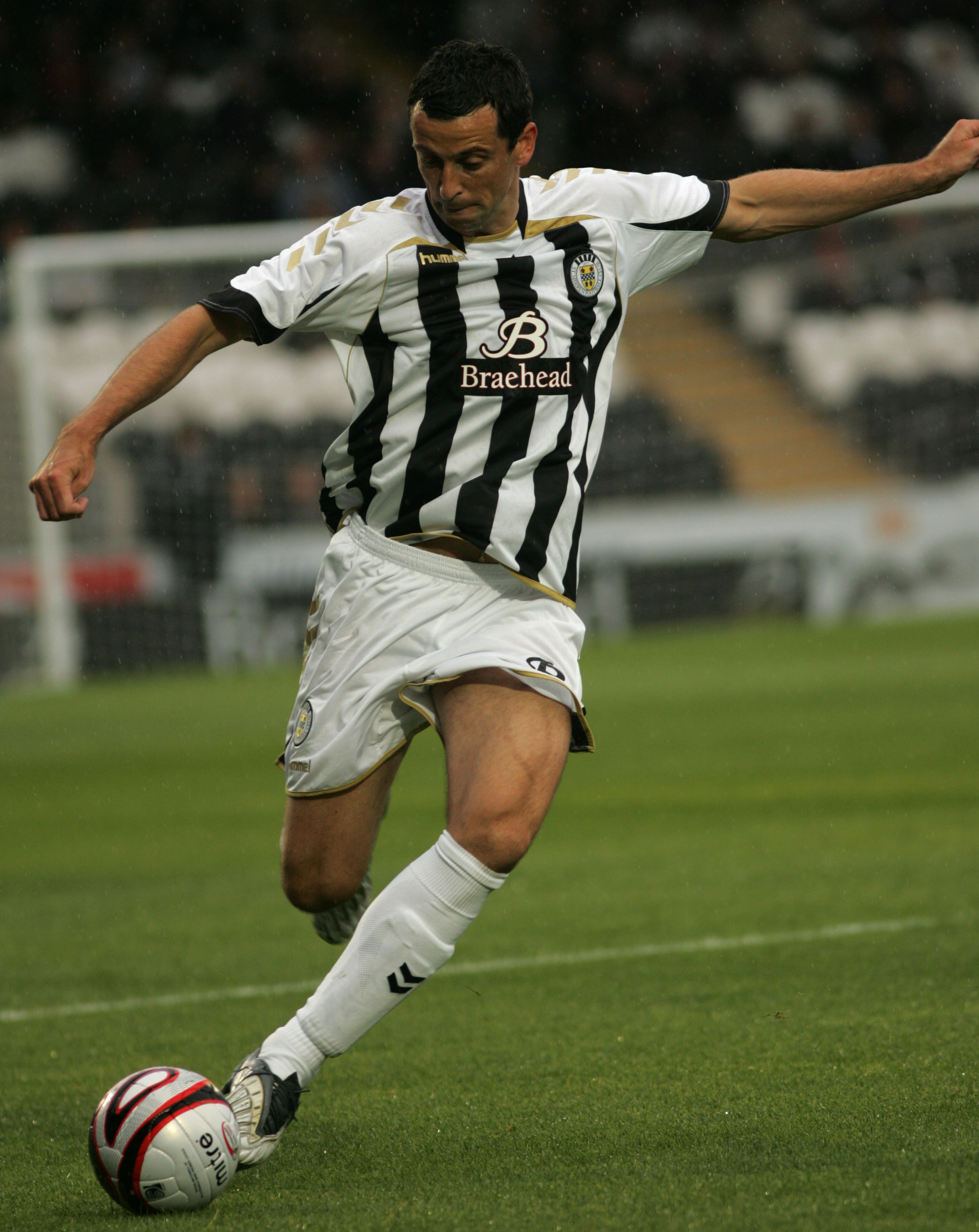
- Ross playing for St Mirren in 2009

Personal information
- Full name: John James Ross
- Date of birth: 5 June 1976 (age 50)
- Place of birth: Falkirk, Scotland
- Position: Defender

Team information
- Current team: Newcastle United (Assistant Director of Football)

Youth career
- 1992–1993: Dundee
- 1993–1995: Forfar Athletic

Senior career*
| Years | Team | Apps | (Gls) |
| 1995–1999 | Camelon Juniors | | |
| 1999–2004 | Clyde | 159 | (9) |
| 2004–2005 | Hartlepool United | 23 | (0) |
| 2005–2008 | Falkirk | 76 | (2) |
| 2008–2010 | St Mirren | 64 | (1) |
| 2010 | Hamilton Academical | 2 | (0) |
| 2010–2011 | Dunfermline Athletic | 0 | (0) |
| Total | | 324 | (12) |

International career
| 2009 | Scotland B | 1 | (0) |

Managerial career
- 2015–2016: Alloa Athletic
- 2016–2018: St Mirren
- 2018–2019: Sunderland
- 2019–2021: Hibernian
- 2022: Dundee United
- * Club domestic league appearances and goals

John James Ross (born 5 June 1976) is a Scottish professional football manager, coach and former player. He is currently Assistant Director of Football at Newcastle United.

During his playing career, Ross played as a defender and midfielder. From 1992 to 1995 he played for youth sides at Dundee and Forfar Athletic, before dropping to the Scottish Junior leagues for first team action at Camelon Juniors. He then returned to the Scottish Football League in 1999 with Clyde, before a short stint in England with Hartlepool United in 2004. He returned to Scotland a year later and played for Falkirk, St Mirren, Hamilton Academical and Dunfermline Athletic until he retired in 2011 due to a knee injury. He also played once for a Scotland B team, in 2009.

Upon retiring, Ross started as a coaching career at Dumbarton, as assistant manager for both Alan Adamson and later Ian Murray, and was caretaker manager between them. He became the coach of the Heart of Midlothian under-20 team in July 2014. Ross was appointed Alloa Athletic manager in December 2015. In October 2016, he was appointed manager of St Mirren, leading them to the 2017–18 Scottish Championship title and was named PFA Scotland Manager of the Year, before leaving to become manager of Sunderland in May 2018. Ross was sacked by Sunderland in October 2019, and was then appointed by Hibernian a month later.

Ross guided Hibernian to a third-place finish in 2021 and two cup final appearances, but was sacked in December 2021. Ross was appointed Dundee United head coach in June 2022, but was sacked two months later after just seven games in charge.

== Playing career ==
=== Early career ===
Ross had spells as a youth player at Dundee and Forfar Athletic. He then moved to Camelon Juniors, where he featured in their 1996 Scottish Junior Cup run, before losing in the final. He joined Clyde in 1999, playing in many different positions before settling in the right midfield role. He was made captain of the team when Ian Spittal was the team coach.

=== Moving to England ===
Ross signed a pre-contractual agreement with Hartlepool United in April 2004. Ross suffered ankle ligament damage and spent a large part of his time on the sidelines. Hartlepool funded his rehabilitation and also allowed him to return home. However, Ross refused to return to Hartlepool, train or play for the club and asked Hartlepool's chairman Ken Hodcroft to tear up his contract claiming he was homesick. Hartlepool refused and asked for compensation and a refund of agent fees. Ross left without consent and later went on sick and claimed that he would not return to Hartlepool even if "they were in the Champions League". He also criticised Hartlepool manager Neale Cooper for feeling let down by his actions, stating that "maybe the manager thinks I have let him down but that's nothing compared with how I feel about him". On 31 July 2005, Hartlepool agreed to terminate his contract after finally receiving compensation, which included a refund of the fees paid to Ross's agent.

=== Return to Scotland ===
Ross transferred to his home town club, Falkirk, in 2005 and was a regular in the team. Falkirk manager John Hughes warned Ross when he stalled on signing a new contract.

On 30 April 2008, it was announced that Ross had signed a pre-contract agreement with St Mirren and joined them at the end of the season on a two-year deal. Ross scored his first goal for St Mirren against Dundee United at Tannadice Park on 24 January 2009.

Having been released by St Mirren at the end of the 2009–10 season, Ross joined Hamilton Academical on a one-year contract. His contract with Hamilton Academical was cancelled after only three games. A few weeks later Ross signed for Dunfermline until the end of the 2010–11 season. He sustained a knee injury in training which led to his eventual retirement from football without having played a game for the Pars.

=== International career ===
Ross won his solitary cap for Scotland at junior level in 1999. In April 2009 he was included in George Burley's Scotland B squad for the match against Northern Ireland B at Broadwood Stadium. He came on at the start of the second half, replacing St Mirren teammate Scott Cuthbert, in a 3–0 win on 6 May.

== Coaching career ==
=== Early career ===
In 2011, Ross joined Dumbarton as assistant manager to Alan Adamson. He became caretaker manager following Adamson's sacking in October 2012. During this spell he led Dumbarton to their first Scottish First Division victory in 16 years, with a 1–0 victory over Cowdenbeath. Despite this he was overlooked for the job and continued as the assistant manager to Adamson's successor Ian Murray in November of that year.

On 1 July 2014, Ross joined the Heart of Midlothian coaching staff. He left this position in October 2015.

=== Alloa Athletic ===
In December 2015, Ross was appointed manager of Scottish Championship club Alloa Athletic. He was unable to stop the part-time club from being relegated from the second tier. Despite their relegation to Scottish League One, Ross was given a new contract by Alloa in April 2016. He led Alloa Athletic to a club-record 10-game winning streak in all competitions at the start of season 2016–17. His part-time side held Celtic to a 0–0 draw for the first 83 minutes at Celtic Park in the Scottish League Cup on 21 September 2016, before conceding two late goals to exit the competition. Ross left the side in second place in the Scottish League One table before leaving. His last game in charge was a 4–2 victory at Bala Town in the Scottish Challenge Cup.

=== St Mirren ===
Ross was appointed manager of St Mirren in October 2016. His first game in charge was a 2–0 home loss to Dundee United, but he guided St Mirren to safety in the 2016–17 Scottish Championship. At the end of the season, Dundee approached St Mirren about Ross becoming their manager, but he decided to stay with the Paisley club.

St Mirren built a large lead in the 2017–18 Scottish Championship, going 14 points clear at the top in February. Ross was interviewed for the manager position at EFL Championship club Barnsley at this time, but he again decided to stay with St Mirren. They went on to win the Scottish Championship and promotion to the Scottish Premiership, while Ross won the PFA Scotland Manager of the Year award for 2017–18. In May 2018, Ipswich Town and Sunderland were given permission by St Mirren to talk with Ross about their managerial vacancies.

=== Sunderland ===
Ross was appointed manager of Sunderland on 25 May 2018, on a two-year deal. The club had suffered a second consecutive relegation to EFL League One, and he was the first arrival under new owner Stewart Donald. In his first season in charge, Ross led the club to the final of the League One play-offs following a 1–0 aggregate win over Portsmouth in the semi-finals. However, they went on to lose in the final to Charlton Athletic. On 8 October 2019, his managerial contract was terminated by the club as they sat sixth in the League One table.

=== Hibernian ===
Scottish Premiership club Hibernian appointed Ross as their head coach on 15 November 2019, on a 3 1/2-year deal. He finished his first season in 7th of 12 teams, dropping one place after the season was abandoned due to the COVID-19 pandemic, and the table finalised on points-per-game.

In 2020–21, Ross guided Hibs to the semi-finals of the Scottish League Cup, where they lost 3–0 to St Johnstone. He argued with BBC Scotland reporter Kenny MacIntyre after the game, accusing him of disrespect. Hibs finished the 2020–21 Scottish Premiership in third place, their highest finishing position in 16 years. They also reached the 2021 Scottish Cup Final, but lost 1–0 to St Johnstone.

In July 2021 Ross agreed a new contract with Hibs, which was due to run until the end of the 2023–24 season. He was sacked in December 2021, after a run of seven defeats in nine league games. Jack Ross was also widely criticised over the style of football he deployed often described as "dull" and "boring. His dismissal came 10 days before the team were due to play in the League Cup final.

=== Dundee United ===
Ross was appointed head coach of Dundee United in June 2022 on a two-year deal. He led the team in their initial 2022–23 UEFA Europa Conference League qualifying campaign, culminating in a 7–1 aggregate loss to AZ Alkmaar, matching the record greatest loss inflicted on a Scottish Club in a European competition. Two days after a 9–0 defeat to Celtic, which left the club at the bottom of the Scottish Premiership, Ross was sacked by United on 30 August 2022, after only seven games in charge.

=== Newcastle United ===
On 31 March 2023, Ross was announced as interim head of coach development at Newcastle United.

On 14 July 2025, it was announced that Ross was promoted to Head of Football Strategy.

== Other activities ==
Ross was chairman of the PFA Scotland players' union until February 2013, when he was succeeded by John Rankin; he also worked with the worldwide FIFPro union alongside part-time coaching roles.

He wrote a blog for the BBC Sport website during his playing career, and authored two children's books. He holds a master's degree in economics from Heriot-Watt University.

== Managerial statistics ==
As of match played 28 August 2022

Managerial record by team and tenure
| Team | From | To | Record | | | | |
| Team | From | To | G | W | D | L | Win % |
|---|---|---|---|---|---|---|---|
| Alloa Athletic | 15 December 2015 | 8 October 2016 | 34 | 13 | 8 | 13 | 38.24 |
| St Mirren | 8 October 2016 | 25 May 2018 | 80 | 42 | 13 | 25 | 52.50 |
| Sunderland | 25 May 2018 | 8 October 2019 | 75 | 38 | 27 | 10 | 50.67 |
| Hibernian | 15 November 2019 | 9 December 2021 | 96 | 47 | 20 | 29 | 48.96 |
| Dundee United | 20 June 2022 | 30 August 2022 | 7 | 1 | 1 | 5 | 14.29 |
| Total | | | 292 | 141 | 69 | 82 | 48.29 |

== Honours ==
=== Player ===
Camelon

- Scottish Junior Cup runner-up: 1995–96

Clyde

- Scottish Second Division: 1999–2000

St Mirren

- Scottish League Cup runner-up: 2009–10
- Renfrewshire Cup: 2009–10

=== Manager ===
St. Mirren

- Scottish Championship: 2017–18
- Scottish Challenge Cup runner-up: 2016–17

Sunderland

- EFL Trophy runner-up: 2018–19

Hibernian

- Scottish Cup runner-up: 2020–21

Individual

- PFA Scotland Manager of the Year: 2017–18
- Scottish Championship Manager of the Year: 2017–18
- EFL League One Manager of the Month: February 2019
