= Owen Ronald =

Scottish footballer

Personal information
- Date of birth: 9 May 1993 (age 33)
- Place of birth: Glasgow, Scotland
- Height: 1.80 m (5 ft 11 in)
- Position: Forward

Senior career*
Years	Team	Apps	(Gls)
2011–2012	Queen's Park	26	(1)
2012	Airdrie United	3	(0)
2012	Stenhousemuir	1	(0)
2013	Albion Rovers	1	(0)
2013–2014	Dumbarton	8	(0)
2013	→ Berwick Rangers (loan)	10	(0)
2014	→ Kirkintilloch Rob Roy (loan)	5	(0)
2014–2016	Cumnock Juniors		
2016–2017	Cumbernauld Colts	18	(2)
2017	Kilbirnie Ladeside		
2017–2021	Linlithgow Rose		
2021–2023	Gartcairn F. A. Juniors		
2023	St Cadoc's		(2)
2023–2024	East Stirlingshire		
2024–	Shotts Bon Accord		
- * Club domestic league appearances and goals

Owen Ronald (born 9 May 1993) is a Scottish footballer as a forward.

Ronald played in the Scottish League and the SPFL for Queen's Park, Airdrie United, Stenhousemuir, Albion Rovers, Dumbarton and Berwick Rangers and dropped into non-League football in 2014. He represented Scotland at U18 schoolboy level.

== Personal life ==
Ronald's father is former footballer Paul Ronald.

== Career statistics ==
Appearances and goals by club, season and competition
Club	Season	League			Scottish Cup		League Cup		Other		Total	
Club	Season	Division	Apps	Goals	Apps	Goals	Apps	Goals	Apps	Goals	Apps	Goals
Queen's Park	2011–12	Third Division	19	1	0	0	0	0	1 (Note: Appearances in Scottish Second Division play-offs)	0	20	1
Queen's Park	2012–13	Third Division	7	0	2	0	2	0	1 (Note: Appearance in Scottish Challenge Cup)	0	9	0
Queen's Park	Total		26	1	2	0	2	0	2	0	29	1
Airdrie United	2012–13	First Division	3	0	—		—		—		2	0
Stenhousemuir	2012–13	Second Division	1	0	—		—		—		1	0
Albion Rovers	2012–13	Second Division	1	0	—		—		—		1	0
Dumbarton	2012–13	First Division	5	0	—		—		—		5	0
Berwick Rangers (loan)	2013–14	League Two	10	0	0	0	1	0	1	1	11	1
Kirkintilloch Rob Roy (loan)	2013–14	West of Scotland Super League Premier Division	5	0	—		—		5 (Note: 4 appearances in Central Sectional League Cup, 1 appearance in West Region League play-off)	0	10	0
Cumbernauld Colts	2016–17	Lowland League	18	2	4	1	—		4 (Note: 3 appearances and 1 goal in SFA South Region Challenge Cup, 1 appearance in Scottish Challenge Cup)	1	26	4
Career total			69	3	6	1	3	0	12	2	90	6

== Honours ==
- Scottish League Young Player of the Month: March 2012
