= 2016–17 Scottish League One =

Scottish League One
- Season: 2016–17
- Champions: Livingston
- Promoted: Livingston; Brechin City
- Relegated: Peterhead; Stenhousemuir
- Matches: 180
- Goals: 509 (2.83 per match)
- Top goalscorer: Andy Ryan (23 goals)
- Biggest home win: Alloa Athletic 6–1 Brechin City (15 April 2017)
- Biggest away win: Stenhousemuir 0–5 Stranraer (15 October 2016); Airdrieonians 0–5 Stenhousemuir (10 December 2016)
- Highest scoring: Stranraer 2–5 Alloa Athletic (13 August 2016); Albion Rovers 3–4 Airdrieonians (11 March 2017)
- Longest winning run: 9 matches: Livingston
- Longest unbeaten run: 10 matches: East Fife
- Longest winless run: 10 matches: Peterhead
- Longest losing run: 5 matches: Stenhousemuir
- Highest attendance: 1,633; Airdrieonians 1–2 Albion Rovers (2 January 2017)
- Lowest attendance: 228; Albion Rovers 0–2 Brechin City (13 August 2016)
- Total attendance: 101,700
- Average attendance: 565 (410)
- All statistics correct as of 7 May 2017.

The 2016–17 Scottish League One (known as Ladbrokes League One for sponsorship reasons) was the 23rd season in the current format of 10 teams in the third-tier of Scottish football. The fixtures were published on 17 June 2016.

Ten teams contested the league: Airdrieonians, Albion Rovers, Alloa Athletic, Brechin City, East Fife, Livingston, Peterhead, Queen's Park, Stenhousemuir and Stranraer.

== Teams ==
The following teams changed division since the 2015–16 season.

=== To League One ===
Promoted from Scottish League Two

- East Fife
- Queen's Park

Relegated from Scottish Championship

- Alloa Athletic
- Livingston

=== From League One ===
Relegated to Scottish League Two

- Forfar Athletic
- Cowdenbeath

Promoted to Scottish Championship

- Dunfermline Athletic
- Ayr United

=== Stadia and locations ===
Airdrieonians	Albion Rovers	Alloa Athletic	Brechin City
Excelsior Stadium	Cliftonhill	Recreation Park	Glebe Park
Capacity: 10,101	Capacity: 1,238	Capacity: 3,100	Capacity: 4,083
East Fife	2016–17 Scottish League One is located in Scotland		Livingston
Bayview Stadium	2016–17 Scottish League One is located in Scotland		Almondvale Stadium
Capacity: 1,998	2016–17 Scottish League One is located in Scotland		Capacity: 8,716
Peterhead	Queen's Park	Stenhousemuir	Stranraer
Balmoor	Hampden Park	Ochilview Park	Stair Park
Capacity: 3,150	Capacity: 51,866	Capacity: 4,096	Capacity: 4,178

=== Personnel and kits ===
Team	Manager	Captain	Kit manufacturer	Shirt sponsor
Airdrieonians	(Scotland) Mark Wilson	(Scotland) Marc Fitzpatrick	Under Armour	M&H Logistics
Albion Rovers	(Scotland) Darren Young	(Scotland) Michael Dunlop	Adidas	Reigart Demolition
Alloa Athletic	(Republic of Ireland) Jim Goodwin	(Scotland) Graeme Holmes	Pendle	Chrystal & Hill Ltd
Brechin City	(Scotland) Darren Dods	(Scotland) Paul McLean	Pendle	Delson
East Fife	(Scotland) Barry Smith	(Scotland) Kevin Smith	Joma	W Glendinning Haulage Contractors (Home shirt); EF Joinery (Away shirt)
Livingston	(Scotland) David Hopkin	(Scotland) Sean Crighton	Joma	Tony Macaroni
Peterhead	(Scotland) Jim McInally	(Scotland) Simon Ferry	Adidas	LFH Engineering Ltd
Queen's Park	(Scotland) Gus MacPherson	(Scotland) Paul Woods	Under Armour	Irn-Bru
Stenhousemuir	(Scotland) Brown Ferguson	(Scotland) Mark Gilhaney	Prostar	Gulnar Tandoori Restaurant
Stranraer	(Scotland) Stephen Farrell	(Scotland) Steven Bell	Stanno	Stena Line

=== Managerial changes ===
Team	Outgoing manager	Manner of departure	Date of vacancy	Position in table	Incoming manager	Date of appointment
Alloa Athletic	(Scotland) Jack Ross	Signed by St Mirren	4 October 2016	3rd	(Republic of Ireland) Jim Goodwin	11 October 2016
Airdrieonians	(Scotland) Eddie Wolecki Black (Scotland) Kevin McBride	Stepped down Sacked	30 October 2016	4th	(Scotland) Mark Wilson	31 October 2016
East Fife	(Scotland) Gary Naysmith	Signed by Queen of the South	5 December 2016	9th	(Scotland) Barry Smith	13 December 2016
Stranraer	(Scotland) Brian Reid	Resigned	16 January 2017	10th	(Scotland) Stephen Farrell	20 January 2017

== League summary ==
=== League table ===
Pos	Team	Pld	W	D	L	GF	GA	GD	Pts	Promotion, qualification or relegation
1	Livingston (C, P)	36	26	3	7	80	32	+48	81	Promotion to Scottish Championship
2	Alloa Athletic	36	17	11	8	69	44	+25	62	Qualification to Championship play-offs
3	Airdrieonians	36	16	4	16	61	66	−5	52	Qualification to Championship play-offs
4	Brechin City (O, P)	36	15	5	16	43	49	−6	50	Qualification to Championship play-offs
5	East Fife	36	12	10	14	41	44	−3	46	
6	Queen's Park	36	12	10	14	37	51	−14	46	
7	Stranraer	36	12	8	16	46	50	−4	44	
8	Albion Rovers	36	11	9	16	41	48	−7	42	
9	Peterhead (R)	36	10	10	16	44	59	−15	40	Qualification to League One play-offs
10	Stenhousemuir (R)	36	11	6	19	45	64	−19	39	Relegation to Scottish League Two

Updated to match(es) played on 6 May 2017. Source: Soccerway
Rules for classification: 1) Points; 2) Goal difference; 3) Number of goals scored
(C) Champions; (O) Play-off winners; (P) Promoted; (R) Relegated

=== Positions by round ===
Leader - Promotion to 2017–18 Scottish Championship
Qualification to Championship play-offs
Qualification to League One play-offs
Relegation to 2017–18 Scottish League Two

The table lists the positions of teams after each week of matches. In order to preserve chronological progress, any postponed matches are not included in the round at which they were originally scheduled, but added to the full round they were played immediately afterwards. For example, if a match is scheduled for matchday 13, but then postponed and played between days 16 and 17, it will be added to the standings for day 16.

Team ╲ Round	1	2	3	4	5	6	7	8	9	10	11	12	13	14	15	16	17	18	19	20	21	22	23	24	25	26	27	28	29	30	31	32	33	34	35	36
Livingston	1	2	1	3	3	2	3	2	3	2	1	1	1	1	1	1	1	1	1	1	1	1	1	1	1	1	1	1	1	1	1	1	1	1	1	1
Alloa Athletic	2	1	2	1	2	1	1	3	1	3	3	3	3	4	4	3	4	4	4	2	2	2	2	3	2	2	2	2	2	2	2	2	2	2	2	2
Airdrieonians	3	5	4	4	5	5	7	6	7	5	4	4	4	2	2	2	2	2	2	3	3	3	3	2	3	3	4	4	4	4	4	3	4	5	3	3
Brechin City	4	3	3	2	1	3	2	1	2	1	2	2	2	3	3	4	3	3	3	4	4	4	4	5	6	6	7	5	6	5	5	4	5	4	4	4
East Fife	6	4	5	6	4	4	4	4	6	7	8	9	9	9	9	8	7	6	6	6	6	5	5	6	4	4	3	3	3	3	3	5	6	3	5	5
Queen's Park	8	6	6	5	6	6	8	8	8	9	9	8	7	7	5	5	5	5	5	5	5	6	6	4	5	5	5	6	5	6	6	6	3	6	6	6
Stranraer	9	9	10	7	9	7	5	7	5	6	7	7	8	8	8	9	9	10	9	9	10	10	10	9	9	9	6	7	7	8	7	8	8	8	8	7
Albion Rovers	5	7	7	8	7	8	6	5	4	4	5	5	5	5	6	6	6	7	7	7	7	7	7	7	7	8	9	9	9	7	8	7	7	7	7	8
Peterhead	10	10	8	10	8	9	9	10	9	8	6	6	6	6	7	7	8	8	8	8	8	8	8	8	8	7	8	8	8	9	9	9	9	9	10	9
Stenhousemuir	7	8	9	9	10	10	10	9	10	10	10	10	10	10	10	10	10	9	10	10	9	9	9	10	10	10	10	10	10	10	10	10	10	10	9	10

Updated to match(es) played on 7 May 2017. Source:

== Results ==
Teams play each other four times, twice in the first half of the season (home and away) and twice in the second half of the season (home and away), making a total of 36 games.

=== First half of season ===
Home \ Away	AIR	ALB	ALO	BRE	EFI	LIV	PET	QPA	STE	STR
Airdrieonians		0–2	2–1	1–0	1–1	2–4	1–3	4–1	0–5	1–0
Albion Rovers	1–2		0–4	0–2	1–0	0–1	0–1	2–0	4–0	3–2
Alloa Athletic	1–2	0–0		1–2	2–1	1–3	4–0	1–1	4–1	2–2
Brechin City	3–2	1–2	0–1		0–1	0–3	2–1	0–0	2–1	2–0
East Fife	0–1	2–2	2–2	1–2		3–1	2–0	1–2	0–1	2–0
Livingston	2–0	1–2	3–1	2–1	3–1		1–2	1–2	4–1	5–1
Peterhead	2–4	2–2	1–1	1–3	0–3	1–2		2–0	0–2	2–0
Queen's Park	1–3	2–1	1–2	2–0	1–0	1–0	0–0		0–3	0–2
Stenhousemuir	2–2	1–0	2–2	1–3	0–1	0–4	2–2	1–2		0–5
Stranraer	1–2	3–2	2–5	0–1	1–1	1–2	1–0	0–2	3–1	

Updated to match(es) played on 28 March 2017. Source: Scottish League 1
Legend: Blue = home team win; Yellow = draw; Red = away team win.

=== Second half of season ===
Home \ Away	AIR	ALB	ALO	BRE	EFI	LIV	PET	QPA	STE	STR
Airdrieonians		1–2	0–1	3–1	2–2	0–4	4–1	3–2	1–0	1–2
Albion Rovers	3–4		1–1	1–0	0–1	0–2	0–0	1–1	1–1	3–0
Alloa Athletic	2–1	1–1		6–1	3–0	2–2	0–1	2–2	2–1	1–0
Brechin City	3–0	1–0	1–2		2–1	0–2	0–1	3–1	2–2	0–0
East Fife	0–4	2–0	0–0	3–2		2–1	1–2	0–0	1–0	0–0
Livingston	4–2	3–0	2–1	3–0	0–1		4–1	4–0	1–0	0–0
Peterhead	1–1	1–1	3–2	0–1	1–1	2–3		4–0	0–1	2–2
Queen's Park	2–1	2–0	0–2	1–1	2–2	1–1	2–0		0–2	0–1
Stenhousemuir	4–2	0–3	2–4	1–1	3–1	0–1	3–1	0–2		1–0
Stranraer	2–1	3–0	1–2	2–0	2–1	0–1	3–3	1–1	3–0	

Updated to match(es) played on 6 May 2017. Source: Scottish League 1
Legend: Blue = home team win; Yellow = draw; Red = away team win.

== Season statistics ==
=== Scoring ===
==== Top scorers ====
As of matches played on 6 May 2017

Rank	Player	Club	Goals
1	(Scotland) Andy Ryan	Airdrieonians	23
2	(Scotland) Liam Buchanan	Livingston	22
3	(Scotland) Iain Russell	Airdrieonians	18
4	(Scotland) Greig Spence	Alloa Athletic	16
4	(Scotland) Rory McAllister	Peterhead	16
6	(Scotland) Jordan Kirkpatrick	Alloa Athletic	14
6	(Scotland) Danny Mullen	Livingston	14
8	(Republic of Ireland) Andy Jackson	Brechin City	13
8	(Scotland) Craig Malcolm	Stranraer	13

==== Hat-tricks ====
Player	For	Against	Result	Date	Ref
(Scotland) Iain Russell	Airdrieonians	Queen's Park	4–1	22 October 2016	
(Scotland) Ross Caldwell	Brechin City	Peterhead	3–1	5 November 2016	
(Scotland) Andy Ryan	Airdrieonians	East Fife	4–0	29 April 2017	

=== Discipline ===
==== Player ====
===== Yellow cards =====
As of matches played on 6 May 2017

Rank	Player	Club	Cards
1	(Scotland) Dougie Hill	Brechin City	13
1	(Scotland) Ryan McGeever	Queen's Park	13
3	(Scotland) Rory McAllister	Peterhead	12
3	(Scotland) Jamie McCormack	Stenhousemuir	12
5	(Scotland) Ryan Wallace	Albion Rovers	10
6	(Scotland) Iain Russell	Airdrieonians	9
6	(England) Steven Hetherington	Alloa Athletic	9
6	(Scotland) Scott Ross	Peterhead	9
6	(Scotland) David Marsh	Stenhousemuir	9
6	(Scotland) Steven Bell	Stranraer	9

===== Red cards =====
As of matches played on 6 May 2017

Rank	Player	Club	Cards
1	(Republic of Ireland) Jim Goodwin	Alloa Athletic	2
1	(Scotland) David Marsh	Stenhousemuir	2
3	36 players		1

==== Club ====
===== Yellow cards =====
As of matches played on 6 May 2017

Rank	Club	Cards
1	Queen's Park	76
2	Airdrieonians	71
3	Peterhead	70

===== Red cards =====
As of matches played on 6 May 2017

Rank	Club	Cards
1	Airdrieonians	7
1	East Fife	7
3	Stenhousemuir	6

=== Attendances ===
Pos	Team	Total	High	Low	Average	Change
1	Airdrieonians	14,945	1,633	482	830	−3.6%
2	Albion Rovers	8,092	1,199	228	449	−19.0%
3	Alloa Athletic	9,561	712	307	531	−52.6%
4	Brechin City	7,715	553	283	428	−20.7%
5	East Fife	11,273	918	412	626	+0.2%
6	Livingston	14,344	1,099	531	796	−53.9%
7	Peterhead	9,081	681	365	504	−20.8%
8	Queen's Park	11,605	957	481	644	+24.3%
9	Stenhousemuir	7,715	604	331	428	−24.4%
10	Stranraer	7,369	523	317	409	−19.2%
	League total	101,700	1,633	228	565	−42.1%

Updated to games played on 6 May 2017

== Awards ==
=== Monthly awards ===
Month	Manager of the Month		Player of the Month		Ref.
Month	Manager	Club	Player	Club	Ref.
August	(Scotland) Jack Ross	Alloa Athletic	(Scotland) Jordan Kirkpatrick	Alloa Athletic	
September	(Scotland) Gary Naysmith	East Fife	(England) Jamie Insall	East Fife	
October	(Scotland) David Hopkin	Livingston	(Scotland) Liam Buchanan	Livingston	
November	(Scotland) Mark Wilson	Airdrieonians	(Scotland) Rohan Ferguson	Airdrieonians	
December	(Scotland) Bary Smith	East Fife	(England) Jonathan Page	East Fife	
January	(Scotland) Jim McInally	Peterhead	(Scotland) Michael Dunlop	Albion Rovers	
February	(Republic of Ireland) Jim Goodwin	Alloa Athletic	(Scotland) Willie Gibson	Stranraer	
March	(Scotland) David Hopkin	Livingston	(Republic of Ireland) Andy Jackson	Brechin City	
April	(Scotland) David Hopkin	Livingston	(Scotland) Liam Buchanan	Livingston	

== League One play-offs ==
Peterhead the second bottom team, entered into a 4-team playoff with the 2nd-4th placed teams in 2016–17 Scottish League Two; Annan Athletic, Forfar Athletic and Montrose.

=== Semi-finals ===
==== First leg ====
10 May 2017	Montrose	1 – 1	Peterhead	Montrose
19:45	Templeman 14'	BBC Sport report	Strachan 10'	Stadium: Links Park; Attendance: 1,251; Referee: Mat Northcroft

10 May 2017	Annan Athletic	2 – 2	Forfar Athletic	Annan
19:45	Weatherson 4'; Smith 16'	BBC Sport report	Travis 81'; Fotheringham 82'	Stadium: Galabank; Attendance: 629; Referee: Crawford Allan

==== Second leg ====
13 May 2017	Peterhead	3 – 0 (4 – 1 agg.)	Montrose	Peterhead
15:00	McAllister 34', 51' (pen.); Brown 90+2'	BBC Sport report	Smith (red card) 69'	Stadium: Balmoor Stadium; Attendance: 1,096; Referee: Steven Kirkland

13 May 2017	Forfar Athletic	4 – 2 (6 – 4 agg.)	Annan Athletic	Forfar
15:00	Swankie 12', 37'; Denholnm 32'; Bain 73'	BBC Sport report	Smith 50' (pen.); Ramsay 67'	Stadium: Station Park; Referee: John McKendrick

=== Final ===
The winners of the semi-finals will compete against one another over two legs, with the winner competing in the 2017–18 Scottish League One.

==== First leg ====
17 May 2017	Forfar Athletic	2 – 1	Peterhead	Forfar
19:45	Fotheringham 54'; Travis 74'	BBC Sport report	McAllister 3'; McMullin (yellow card) 51' (yellow-red card)	Stadium: Station Park; Attendance: 958; Referee: Stephen Finnie

==== Second leg ====
20 May 2017	Peterhead	1 – 5 (2 – 7 agg.)	Forfar Athletic	Peterhead
15:00	Brown 78'	BBC Sport report	Milne 5'; Cox 17'; Denholm 51'; Malone 68'; Peters 83'	Stadium: Balmoor Stadium; Attendance: 1,084; Referee: Gavin Duncan
