= Scott Smith (footballer, born 1992) =

Scottish footballer

Personal information
- Date of birth: 14 January 1992 (age 34)
- Place of birth: Edinburgh, Scotland
- Positions: Left back; centre back

Youth career
- –2011: Hibernian

Senior career*
Years	Team	Apps	(Gls)
2011–2013	Hibernian	0	(0)
2011	→ Brechin City (loan)	12	(0)
2012	→ East Fife (loan)	6	(1)
2013	→ Dumbarton (loan)	19	(0)
2013–2014	Dumbarton	6	(0)
2014–2015	East Fife	26	(0)

International career
2007–2008	Scotland U16	6	(0)
2008–2009	Scotland U17	13	(1)
2010	Scotland U19	3	(0)
- * Club domestic league appearances and goals as of 20:23, 19 February 2017 (UTC)

Scott Smith (born 14 January 1992) is a Scottish footballer, who played for Hibernian, Brechin City, Dumbarton and East Fife.

== Career ==
Born in Edinburgh, Smith made his debut for Hibernian on 23 August 2011, in the Scottish League Cup second round tie against Berwick Rangers at Easter Road. A few days later, Smith was loaned to Brechin City. Smith signed a new contract with Hibs in June 2012. He played for the Hibs under-20 team during the early part of the 2012–13 season. On 31 August 2012, Smith was loaned to East Fife, initially for one month.

Later in the 2012–13 season, Smith was loaned to First Division club Dumbarton. Towards the end of the season, Smith made an agreement to sign for Dumbarton on a permanent basis from 1 July 2013. After only 6 appearances as a signed player he was released in May 2014. He signed for East Fife in July 2014.

Smith represented the Scotland U16, U17 and U19 teams.

== Career statistics ==
As of 16:47, 15 May 2013 (UTC)

Club	Season	League		Cup		League Cup		Other		Total	
Club	Season	App	Goals	App	Goals	App	Goals	App	Goals	App	Goals
Hibernian	2011–12	0	0	0	0	1	0	0	0	1	0
Brechin City (loan)	2011–12	12	0	0	0	0	0	0	0	12	0
East Fife (loan)	2012–13	6	1	0	0	0	0	0	0	6	1
Dumbarton (loan)	2012–13	19	0	0	0	0	0	0	0	19	0
Career total		37	1	0	0	1	0	0	0	38	1
