= James Creaney =

Scottish footballer

Personal information
- Date of birth: 19 October 1988 (age 38)
- Place of birth: Glasgow, Scotland
- Height: 1.74 m (5 ft 9 in)
- Position: Left-back

Youth career
- Kilmarnock
- 2005–2007: Ayr United

Senior career*
Years	Team	Apps	(Gls)
2005–2007	Ayr United	0	(0)
2006–2007	→ Troon (loan)		
2007–2009	Stranraer	31	(0)
2009	Dundalk	0	(0)
2010	Galway United	18	(0)
2010–2013	Dumbarton	81	(0)
2013–2014	Alloa Athletic	8	(0)
2014–2015	Stirling Albion	18	(0)
2015–2016	Hurlford United		
2016	Cowdenbeath	6	(0)
2017	Kilbirnie Ladeside		
2017–2019	Annan Athletic	34	(0)
2019–2022	Stirling Albion	24	(1)

Managerial career
- 2020–2024: Stirling Albion (assistant)
- 2021: Stirling Albion (caretaker)
- * Club domestic league appearances and goals

James Creaney (born 19 October 1988) is a Scottish football coach and a former left-back.

== Career ==
Creaney began his footballing career at Kilmarnock's Academy, and signed with Ayr United in 2005. However, he only played for the club in Cup matches, and two years later (after a spell with Troon in the Junior divisions), he signed with Stranraer.

In August 2009, Creaney moved to Ireland, signing with Dundalk. However, after failing to appear in his new club, he joined Galway United in January 2010. He made his debut for the club on 5 March, in a 0–2 away loss against St Patrick's Athletic.

After being released by Galway in 2010 summer, Creaney signed with Second Division side Dumbarton. In his first season, he was a part of the side who achieved promotion to the First Division; he made his division debut on 11 August 2012, in a 1–4 away defeat against Airdrieonians.

On 30 July 2013, Creaney signed with Alloa Athletic, in the Scottish Championship. In April 2014, he revealed that he had been playing for over a year with a heart condition. On 24 July 2014, Creaney signed for Stirling Albion. After one season with Albion, Creaney signed for Scottish Junior side Hurlford United, spending with year with the club.

In July 2016 Creaney returned to senior football, signing for Scottish League Two side Cowdenbeath on a six-month deal, leaving the club in December 2016 when his contract expired. After a short spell with Kilbirnie Ladeside, Creaney signed for Annan Athletic in July 2017.

Creaney signed for Stirling Albion in 2019, and was made caretaker manager in December 2021 following the resignation of Kevin Rutkiewicz, and until the hiring of Darren Young.
