= Ross Forsyth =

Scottish footballer and coach

Personal information
- Full name: Ross Forsyth
- Date of birth: 20 November 1982 (age 43)
- Place of birth: Glasgow, Scotland
- Height: 5 ft 6 in (1.68 m)
- Position: Defender

Youth career
- St Johnstone 'S' Form

Senior career*
Years	Team	Apps	(Gls)
2000–2005	St Johnstone	76	(2)
2005–2011	Stirling Albion	168	(5)
2011–2012	Greenock Morton	26	(0)
2012–2013	Dumbarton	15	(0)
2013–2017	Stirling Albion	104	(7)
2017–2019	Clydebank		

Managerial career
- 2016–2017: Stirling Albion (player/assistant manager)
- * Club domestic league appearances and goals as of 13:23, 2 March 2020 (UTC)~

Ross Forsyth (born 20 November 1982) is a Scottish former semi-professional footballer and coach. He played for St Johnstone, Greenock Morton, Dumbarton and Stirling Albion.

== Career ==
=== Playing ===
Forsyth started his professional career at Perth side St Johnstone, for which he made his debut against Hibernian on 30 September 2000 in the Scottish Premier League. Forsyth continued to play for St Johnstone until 2005 making over 60 league appearances and scoring three goals for the club before joining Stirling Albion in the summer of 2005.

Forsyth made his Stirling Albion debut on 30 July 2005 against Ayr United. Forsyth scored his first goal against Greenock Morton on 25 October 2005. Forsyth has made over 150 league appearances for Stirling. In the 2006–07 season, Forsyth was awarded the Supporters Trust player of the year award.

At the end of the 2010–11 season, Forsyth signed for full-time side Greenock Morton, but remained part-time. He was released after one season in May 2012, and signed for nearby Dumbarton along with teammate Andy Graham.

=== Coaching ===
Forsyth was appointed assistant manager to new Stirling manager Dave Mackay in December 2016, whilst also continuing as a member of the playing squad. Forsyth left Stirling in June 2017.

He joined Clydebank in July 2017
