= Phil Johnston (footballer) =

Scottish footballer

Personal information
- Date of birth: 19 September 1990 (age 36)
- Place of birth: Glasgow, Scotland
- Height: 5 ft 7 in (1.70 m)
- Position: Defender

Senior career*
Years	Team	Apps	(Gls)
2010–2012	Airdrie United	41	(4)
2012–2013	Dumbarton	9	(0)
2013–2016	Stirling Albion	100	(8)
2016–2017	Clyde	31	(0)
2017–	Clydebank		
- * Club domestic league appearances and goals as of 19:48, 5 January 2018

Phil Johnston (born 19 September 1990) is a Scottish footballer who plays as a defender. Johnston has previously played for Airdrie United, Dumbarton, Stirling Albion and Clyde. He signed for Clydebank in July 2017.

He has also played for the Junior Scotland team.
