= Ryan Metcalf =

Scottish footballer

Personal information
- Date of birth: 6 April 1993 (age 33)
- Position: Midfielder

Senior career*
Years	Team	Apps	(Gls)
2010–2013	Dumbarton	7	(0)
- * Club domestic league appearances and goals

Ryan Metcalf (born 6 April 1993) is a Scottish former footballer who played for Dumbarton, as a midfielder.
