= Mark Gilhaney =

Scottish footballer (born 1984)

Personal information
- Full name: Mark Gilhaney
- Date of birth: 4 November 1984 (age 41)
- Place of birth: Lanark, Scotland
- Position: Winger

Senior career*
Years	Team	Apps	(Gls)
2001–2005	Clyde	73	(7)
2001–2002	→ Cambuslang Rangers (loan)		
2005–2008	Hamilton Academical	89	(10)
2008–2009	Dundee	19	(0)
2009–2010	Alloa Athletic	19	(1)
2010	Stirling Albion	1	(0)
2010–2015	Dumbarton	167	(24)
2015–2017	Stenhousemuir	54	(4)
Total		422	(46)

International career
2003	Scotland U19	1	(0)
- * Club domestic league appearances and goals as of 17:06 16 May 2017 (UTC)

Mark Gilhaney (born 4 November 1984) is a Scottish former footballer who played as a winger. During his career Gilhaney played for Clyde, Cambuslang Rangers (loan), Hamilton Academical, Dundee, Alloa Athletic, Stirling Albion and Dumbarton, before finishing his career with Stenhousemuir.

== Career ==
Gilhaney, a left winger, began his career at Clyde in 2003, where he earned a Scotland U19 cap against a Switzerland U19 team in April 2003. He moved to Hamilton Academical in 2005. He signed a 2-year contract with Dundee on 20 May 2008.

In August 2009, he joined Alloa Athletic, but was released at the end of the season. In August 2010 he signed for Dumbarton following a successful trial period with the club. On 4 May 2013, Gilhaney made his 100th appearance for the club in a 0–0 draw with champions Partick Thistle. Gilhaney signed a new one-year deal for the club in May 2014.

Gilhaney made his 150th appearance for Dumbarton on 31 January 2015, playing the full 90 minutes of a 3–3 draw with Falkirk. He left the club in May after being told he was not in new manager Stephen Aitken's plans. Shortly after leaving Dumbarton, he signed for the Scottish League One side Stenhousemuir on a one-year deal. Gilhaney spent two years with Stenhousemuir, before retiring from football at the end of the 2016–17 season at the age of 32.

== Honours ==
Hamilton Academical

- Scottish Football League First Division: 2007–08

Dumbarton

- Scottish First Division: play-off winners 2011–12
