= Alan Adamson =

Scottish footballer and manager

Personal information
- Full name: Alan Adamson
- Date of birth: 21 May 1963 (age 63)
- Place of birth: Scotland
- Position: Midfielder

Youth career
- Years: Team
- Airdrieonians

Managerial career
- 2010–2012: Dumbarton
- 2011–2019: Alderney

Alan Adamson (born 21 May 1963) is a Scottish football manager and former football player. He was manager of Dumbarton from October 2010 until October 2012.

== Playing career ==
Adamson was with Airdrieonians as a youth in the mid-1970s, but he was released after two years with the club. Adamson did not play in a senior Scottish league match. He then joined the police force, and he played for police representative football teams at Scottish and British level. He also played in Scottish junior football for several clubs, and won two Scottish junior international caps in the early 1980s.

== Coaching career ==
Adamson also managed the Scotland and Great Britain police representative teams. He left the police and began working for South Lanarkshire Council.

Adamson re-entered Scottish senior football in 2005 as assistant manager of Scottish Third Division club Albion Rovers, working for manager Jim Chapman. They left Albion Rovers in May 2007, after the club cited communication problems between Chapman and their director of football.

Adamson and Chapman joined Dumbarton on 31 December 2007. During his spell as assistant, Dumbarton won the 2008–09 Scottish Third Division championship and promotion to the Scottish Second Division. He was appointed interim manager in October 2010, after Chapman had accepted another role at the club. Following a successful stint as interim manager, Adamson was confirmed as Dumbarton manager in April 2011.

Adamson guided his side to third place in the 2011–12 Scottish Second Division. They then beat both Arbroath and Airdrie United home and away to win the play-offs and claim a place in the Scottish First Division. Following a bad start in the second tier the next season with no wins in the first 9 games, he was relieved of his duties on 22 October 2012.

== Statistics ==
=== Manager ===
As of 6 February 2012

Team	Nat	From	To	Record				
Team	Nat	From	To	G	W	D	L	Win %
Dumbarton	(Scotland)	October 2010	October 2012	87	35	16	36	40.23

- statistics include Stirlingshire Cup games.

=== Honours ===
Dumbarton

- Stirlingshire Cup (1): 2010–11
- 2011–12 Scottish First Division Play-off Winners (1)
