= 2010–11 Ayr United F.C. season =

Ayr United
2010–11 season
- Chairman: Lachlan Cameron
- Manager: Brian Reid
- Scottish Second Division: Runners-up (promoted via 1st Division play-offs)
- Scottish Cup: Fifth round, lost to St Mirren
- League Cup: First round, lost to Elgin City
- Challenge Cup: Quarter-final, lost to Partick Thistle
- Top goalscorer: League: Mark Roberts (21); All: Mark Roberts (26)
- Highest home attendance: League: 1,614 (v Livingston); Cup: 5,997 (v St Mirren)
- Lowest home attendance: League: 789 (v East Fife); Cup: 556 (v Cowdenbeath)
Home colours	Away colours	Third colours

After relegation to the Third Tier of Scottish Football, Ayr United play in the Second Division with Airdrie United, Alloa Athletic, Brechin City, Dumbarton, East Fife, Forfar Athletic, Livingston, Peterhead and Stenhousemuir. Ayr regained First Division status following promotion via the play-offs, in which Ayr secured a 7–4 aggregate win over Forfar Athletic and a 3–2 aggregate win over Brechin City. Ayr also enjoyed respectable cup runs, progressing to the Quarter-Finals of the Challenge Cup, before being defeated away to Partick Thistle and reaching the Fifth Round of the Scottish Cup, with victories over Junior side, Sunnybank and SPL club, Hibernian before being knocked out by St Mirren of the SPL respectively, However failed to progress beyond Elgin City of the Scottish Football League Third Division in the League Cup.

== Kit ==
In the aftermath of relegation Ayr United changed kit makers from Surridge Sports to global sportswear giants Nike. The Main shirt sponsor, Paligap, remained the same. The Home Kit with the traditional White with Black trimmings used with either Black or white shorts, The Away kit with Black and Gold trimmings used with black shorts and socks and the Third kit a Red shirt used with either Black or White shorts and socks.

For a complete pictorial history of Ayr United playing kit, see footnote

== Competitions ==
Win Draw Loss

=== Preseason ===
7 July 2010 Friendly	Ayr United (Scotland)	1–2	(Scotland) Stranraer	Somerset Park, Ayr
				Attendance: 243

10 July 2010 Friendly	Ayr United (Scotland)	1–2	(Scotland) Motherwell	Somerset Park, Ayr
				Attendance: 899

14 July 2010 Friendly	Ayr United (Scotland)	1–3	(Scotland) St Mirren	Somerset Park, Ayr
				Attendance: 625

17 July 2010 Friendly	Annan Athletic (Scotland)	4–0	(Scotland) Ayr United	Galabank, Annan
				Attendance: 412

== Other Fixtures ==
Date	Competition	Opponent	Score	Scorer(s)	Attendance
28/09/2010	Garry Hay's Testimonial match	Kilmarnock	4–1 L	Roberts(p 49)	3,774

After numerous years of Service Kilmarnock veteran Garry Hay was awarded with a testimonial match against local neighbours, Ayr United. Mehdi Taouil scored two goals, Craig Bryson with one and Garry Hay the other (penalty). Ironically Ayr's goal came from former Killie player Mark Roberts, Who in his previous game for Ayr scored a hat-trick of penalties against East Fife.

== Cup Draws ==
Shortly after the 2009–10 season the draws for the Challenge Cup (Airdrie away) and the Co-operative Cup (Elgin City away) were made. After Victory against Airdrie in the Challenge Cup Ayr United were given a Home Draw against Fife Side Cowdenbeath. The third round draw was made and Ayr United were drawn away to Partick Thistle. In November the Draw for the Scottish Cup draw was made and Ayr were granted a home tie against Junior side Sunnybank. After comfortably beating Sunnybank, Ayr were rewarded with an away draw with SPL club, Hibernian. After defeating Hibs in a replay, a fifth round tie against another SPL side, St Mirren (at Home) awaited, in which the Paisley club won.

- Ayr United score first

Date	Opponent	Venue	Competition	Score	Att.	Scorer(s)	Match Report
24/07/10	Airdrie United	Recreation Park, Alloa	Challenge Cup	2–1	624	Trouten, Rodgers	BBC Sport
31/07/10	Elgin City	Borough Briggs, Elgin	League Cup	2–3	594	McKeown, Connelly	BBC Sport
10/08/10	Cowdenbeath	Somerset Park, Ayr	Challenge Cup	2–0	556	Campbell, Roberts	BBC Sport
04/09/10	Partick Thistle	Firhill Stadium, Glasgow	Challenge Cup	1–2	1,831	Rodgers	BBC Sport
20/11/10	Sunnybank	Somerset Park, Ayr	Scottish Cup	5–0	1,069	Bannigan, Roberts (x2 p), Rodgers (x2)	BBC Sport
08/01/11	Hibernian	Easter Road, Edinburgh	Scottish Cup	0–0	6,056	None	BBC Sport
18/01/11	Hibernian	Somerset Park, Ayr	Scottish Cup	1–0	3,826	Roberts	BBC Sport
05/02/11	St Mirren	Somerset Park, Ayr	Scottish Cup	1–2	5,997	Roberts p	BBC Sport

The Challenge Cup ties was arranged to be played at the Excelsior Stadium, Airdrie but due to the fact Airdrie United hadn't completed laying their artificial turf, The SFL granted Airdrie the permission to move the venue to Clackmannanshire side Alloa Athletic's stadium Recreation Park, because of its synthetic pitch. (Alloa were playing away to Dundee in the Cup). A week after, Ayr United made the way up to Elgin, for the first time since July 1979. Ayr scored first, then Elgin scored two quick goals. Aaron Connelly scored the first goal of his career. Elgin City scored 40 seconds before the tie went to penalties. After two defeats in both the Co-Operative cup and league Ayr had a second round tie with, First Division side, Cowdenbeath, in which Ayr ran out surprise winners. However Ayr were knocked out in the next round by Glasgow Club Partick Thistle. As November approached Ayr entered the Scottish Cup and faced Aberdeen Junior team, Sunnybank. A game that Ayr easily won 5–0 with goals from loan-signing Stuart Bannigan, two goals from the Penalty spot, A header and a sublime over-head kick from Andy Rodgers. An Away draw against SPL side, Hibernian awaited Ayr. Ayr drew 0–0 in the Capital. But were victorious in a replay. United were knocked out in the fifth round by SPL club, St Mirren, by two goals to one.

=== Fixtures ===
==== August ====
	Opponent	Venue	Score	Scorer(s)	Date	Att.	Report
1	Brechin City	Home	0–2	None	07/08/2010	1,212	BBC Sport
2	Airdrie United	Away	2–2	Roberts(5, 73)	14/08/2010	1,127	BBC Sport
3	Dumbarton	Home	1–0	Own Goal (35)	21/08/2010	1,242	BBC Sport
4	Peterhead	Home	1–1	Roberts (90 p)	28/08/2010	1,099	BBC Sport

On the opening day of the Season, Brechin City made the journey to Somerset Park and took all three points. Ayr made the first away trip of the season to Airdrie United. Ayr went two-nil up with two goals from Mark Roberts. David Crawford was sent off, and Airdrie were awarded a penalty (from which they scored). Airdrie also had two players sent off. With his red card David Crawford was suspended for the home game against Dumbarton. Alan Main had to play in the goals (as a trialist) and did again against Peterhead at home as well.

At the end of August, Ayr had only picked up five points from four games (winning against Dumbarton at home and drawing with Airdrie United and Peterhead). Ayr United sat seventh in the Second Division, five points adrift from league leaders Livingston and two points from a play-off spot.
Average Home Attendance: 1,184
Total Average Attendance: 1,170

==== September ====
	Opponent	Venue	Score	Scorer(s)	Date	Att.	Report
5	Alloa Athletic	Away	4–1	Smith (27)	11/09/2010	641	BBC Sport
6	East Fife	Away	2–3	Roberts (13 p,45 p, 90 p )	18/09/2010	664	BBC Sport
7	Stenhousemuir	Home	2–0	McCann (45), McKay (87)	25/09/2010	1,065	BBC Sport

Ayr United started September with a trip to Alloa to play Alloa Athletic. Ayr were convincingly beaten by their hosts, by Four-Goals to One. The following week Ayr United travelled to Methil, Fife to face East Fife, In a game which saw four penalties awarded (all but one being awarded to Ayr). Mark Roberts scored all three, becoming the first ever Ayr United player to do so in the 100-year history of the club. The following week Ayr played host to Stenhousemuir in which they were comfortable two-nil winners.
Average Home Attendance: 1,065
Total Average Attendance: 790

==== October ====
	Opponent	Venue	Score	Scorer(s)	Date	Att.	Report
8	Livingston	Home	3–1	Malone(75), Roberts(80, 83)	02/10/2010	1,270	BBC Sport
International Break
9	Forfar Athletic	Away	4–1	Easton (89)	16/10/2010	544	BBC Sport
10	Alloa Athletic	Home	2–1	Roberts (35), McLaughlin (82)	23/10/2010	1,176	BBC Sport
11	Peterhead	Away	2–4	Mark Roberts (33 p), Trouten (38), McCann (67), McKay (82)	30/10/2010	560	BBC Sport

October began on a high as the League Leaders Livingston made the journey to the West coast and were convincingly beaten 3–1 after taking the lead through Liam Fox but was cancelled out by goals from Eddie Malone and Mark Roberts. Ayr's next fixture wasn't as good as they were beaten by conceded three penalties and had Dean Keenan and Ross Robertson sent off. The Next visitors to Somerset Park were Alloa Athletic who were beaten Goals from Mark Roberts and an Own-Goal, Claimed by Scott McLaughlin. Ayr's Next Away trip was to Peterhead. Where Ayr were comfortable 4–2 Winners with goal from Mark Roberts, Alan Trouten, Ryan McCann and Daniel McKay.
Average Home Attendance: 1,223
Total Average Attendance: 887

==== November ====
	Opponent	Venue	Score	Scorer(s)	Date	Att.	Report
12	Airdrie United	Home	1–0	McLaughlin (90+3)	06/11/2010	1,439	BBC Sport
13	Dumbarton	Away	3–2	Roberts (66), Rodgers (90+1)	13/11/2010	811	BBC Sport

Ayr started the month victorious over rivals Airdrie United, when former diamond Scott McLaughlin scored a late winner against his old team. Ayr were not quite as fortunate as they were beaten 3–2 away to bottom club Dumbarton. The Next week saw Ayr face junior side Sunnybank in the Scottish Cup, which Ayr won with goals from Stuart Bannigan, Two from Mark Roberts scored two and Andy Rodgers who also scored twice. Ayr fixture with East Fife that was due to take place on the 27/11/2010 but was postponed due to the Referee strike.
Average Home Attendance: 1,439
Total Average Attendance: 1,125

==== December ====
None of Ayr United's fixtures scheduled to take place in December went ahead due to the big freeze.

==== January ====
	Opponent	Venue	Score	Scorer(s)	Date	Att.	Report
14	Dumbarton	Home	2–0	Roberts (11 p), McKay (78)	02/01/2011	1,224	BBC Sport
15	Alloa Athletic	Away	0–1	Easton (64)	15/01/2011	527	BBC Sport
16	Peterhead	Home	2–2	Roberts (12 p, 28 p)	22/01/2011	1,226	BBC Sport
17	Stenhousemuir	Home	4–3	Roberts (6 p, 63), Lauchlan (51), Robertson (54)	29/01/2011	1,181	BBC Sport

Average Home Attendance: 1,210
Total Average Attendance: 1,040

==== February ====
	Opponent	Venue	Score	Scorer(s)	Date	Att.	Report
18	Livingston	Home	0–3	None	12/02/2011	1,614	BBC Sport
19	East Fife	Home	0–4	None	23/02/2011	789	BBC Sport
20	Brechin City	Home	2–0	Bannigan (45), McLaughlin (63)	26/02/2011	1,092	BBC Sport

Average Home Attendance: 1,165
Total Average Attendance: 1,165

==== March ====
	Opponent	Venue	Score	Scorer(s)	Date	Att.	Report
21	Stenhousemuir	Away	3–1	Bannigan (5)	01/03/2011	484	BBC Sport
22	Airdrie United	Away	0–5	Willis (50), Roberts (62), Moffat (69), McLaughlin (82), Rodgers (87p)	05/03/2011	966	BBC Sport
23	Alloa Athletic	Home	1–0	McCann (45)	12/03/2011	1,049	BBC Sport
24	Peterhead	Away	1–2	Trouten (24), Moffat (68)	19/03/2011	536	BBC Sport
25	Forfar Athletic	Home	0–1	None	23/03/2011	909	BBC Sport
26	Stenhousemuir	Away	2–1	Roberts (90)	26/03/2011	568	BBC Sport
27	East Fife	Away	3–2	Moffat (39), (89)	29/03/2011	350	BBC Sport

==== April ====
	Opponent	Venue	Score	Scorer(s)	Date	Att.	Report
28	East Fife	Home	1–1	Trouten (16)	02/04/2011	976	BBC Sport
29	Forfar Athletic	Away	3–2	Trouten (37), McLaughlin (71)	05/04/2011	341	BBC Sport
30	Forfar Athletic	Home	3–1	Bannigan (8, 82), Roberts (13)	09/04/2011	851	BBC Sport
31	Brechin City	Away	0–3	Moffat (33), Roberts (35), Crawford (85)	12/04/2011	394	BBC Sport
32	Livingston	Away	0–0	None	16/04/2011	1,492	BBC Sport
33	Livingston	Away	3–2	Roberts (40 p), Robertson (90)	19/04/2011	904	BBC Sport
34	Dumbarton	Away	1–2	Trouten (10), Moffat (16)	23/04/2011	830	BBC Sport
35	Airdrie United	Home	3–1	Rodgers (48, 60 p), Moffat (65)	30/04/2011	1,402	BBC Sport

==== May ====
	Opponent	Venue	Score	Scorer(s)	Date	Att.	Report
36	Brechin City	Away	1–0	None	07/05/2011	577	BBC Sport

==== Play-offs ====
Round	Leg	Opponent	Venue	Score	Scorer(s)	Date	Att.	Report	Agg.
Semi-Final	1st	Forfar Athletic	Away	1–4	Moffat (2), Own Goal (35), McCann (52), Rodgers (87)	11/05/2011	924	BBC Sport	7–4
Semi-Final	2nd	Forfar Athletic	Home	3–3	Moffat (12), McLaughlin (48), Trouten (90 p)	14/05/2011	1,198	BBC Sport	7–4
Final	1st	Brechin City	Home	1–1	Moffat (31)	18/05/2011	2,020	BBC Sport	3–2
Final	2nd	Brechin City	Away	1–2	Roberts (77), Moffat (88)	22/05/2011	2,404	BBC Sport	3–2

== Final League Table ==
Pos	Team	Pld	W	D	L	GF	GA	GD	Pts	Promotion, qualification or relegation
1	Livingston (C, P)	36	25	7	4	79	33	+46	82	Promotion to the First Division
2	Ayr United (O, P)	36	18	5	13	62	55	+7	59	Qualification for the First Division play-offs
3	Forfar Athletic	36	17	8	11	50	48	+2	59	Qualification for the First Division play-offs
4	Brechin City	36	15	12	9	63	45	+18	57	Qualification for the First Division play-offs
5	East Fife	36	14	10	12	77	60	+17	52	

Source: SPFL
Rules for classification: 1) points; 2) goal difference; 3) number of goals scored.
(C) Champions; (O) Play-off winners; (P) Promoted

== Changes to the squad ==
After relegation to the Second Division many players parted ways with the club, such as Tam McManus, who later joined Falkirk, Craig Samson, who joined St Mirren in the SPL, and Stephen Grindlay re-joined one of his former clubs Dumbarton. Scott Agnew and David Mitchell went to the Third Division to play with Stranraer, as did Kevin Cawley, who joined East Stirlingshire and Andy Aitken who joined his home town club Annan Athletic. However, manager Brian Reid brought in David Crawford, who was voted the Player of the Year at Alloa Athletic the season before and Ryan McWilliams from Greenock Morton as goalkeepers. Chris Smith and Bobby Donnelly were signed at the back, but were later joined by Eddie Malone and the well-experienced Jim Lauchlan. Alan Trouten and Scott McLaughlin were signed from Airdrie United as did Ryan McCann later in the campaign, Stephen McKeown was also signed but only played 6 games before his contract was terminated after a bust up with the management. Andy Rodgers was signed from East Stirlingshire and Michael Moffat joined in January from Junior side Girvan. Reid also brought in players such as Stephen Reynolds (from St Johnstone) and Daniel McKay (from Kilmarnock) in on Loan. Also Jonathan Tiffoney, Ross Robertson, Roddy Patterson, Shaun Kelly and Aaron Connelly (who joined Annan Athletic and later Girvan on loan).

=== In ===
Name	Previous club	Age	Pos
David Crawford	(Scotland) Alloa Athletic	24	GK
Alan Martin	(England) Leeds United	22	GK
Ryan McWilliams	(Scotland) Greenock Morton	20	GK
Bobby Donnelly	(Scotland) Airdrie United	23	DF
Chris Smith	(Scotland) Dumbarton	21	DF
Eddie Malone	(Scotland) Dundee	25	DF
Jim Lauchlan	(Republic of Ireland) Sligo Rovers	33	DF
Alan Trouten	(Scotland) Airdrie United	24	MF
Scott McLaughlin	(Scotland) Airdrie United	26	MF
Ryan McCann	(Scotland) Airdrie United	29	MF
Stuart Bannigan	(Scotland) Partick Thistle(Loan)	17	MF
Scott Taggart	(Scotland) Hibernian (Loan)	19	MF
Stephen McKeown	(Scotland) Partick Thistle	28	MF
Andy Rodgers	(Scotland) East Stirlingshire	26	FW
Stephen Reynolds	(Scotland) St Johnstone (Loan)	18	FW
Danny McKay	(Scotland) Kilmarnock(Loan)	19	FW
Michael Moffat	(Scotland) Girvan	25	FW

=== Out ===
Player	Signed from	Signed to	Pos
Craig Samson	(England) Hereford United	(Scotland) St Mirren	GK
Stephen Grindlay	(Scotland) Queen of the South	(Scotland) Dumbarton	GK
David Mitchell	(Scotland) Youth Academy	(Scotland) Stranraer	GK
Andy Aitken	(Scotland) Queen of the South	(Scotland) Annan Athletic	DF
Kevin James	(Scotland) St Johnstone	Released	DF
Kenny Connolly	(Scotland) Motherwell	Released	MF
Scott Agnew	(Scotland) Alloa Athletic	(Scotland) Stranraer	MF
Junior Mendes	(England) Ilkeston Town	Released	FW
Kevin Cawley	(Scotland) Celtic	(Scotland) East Stirlingshire	FW
Tam McManus	(Northern Ireland) Derry City	(Scotland) Falkirk	FW

== Current squad ==
As of 3 June 2010 Note: Flags indicate national team as defined under FIFA eligibility rules; some limited exceptions apply. Players may hold more than one non-FIFA nationality.

No.	Pos.	Nation	Player
—	GK	SCO	David Crawford
—	GK	SCO	Alan Martin
—	GK	SCO	Ryan McWilliams
—	GK	SCO	Darryl Jones
—	DF	SCO	Martyn Campbell (Vice-Captain)
—	DF	SCO	Bobby Donnelly
—	DF	SCO	Iain Fisher
—	DF	SCO	Jim Lauchlan
—	DF	SCO	Eddie Malone
—	DF	SCO	Ross Robertson
—	DF	SCO	Chris Smith
—	MF	SCO	Stuart Bannigan (On loan from Partick Thistle)
—	MF	SCO	David Crawford (On loan from Hibernian)

No.	Pos.	Nation	Player
—	MF	SCO	William Easton
—	MF	SCO	Dean Keenan
—	MF	SCO	Ryan McCann
—	MF	SCO	Scott McLaughlin
—	MF	SCO	Jonathan Tiffoney
—	MF	SCO	Alan Trouten
—	MF	SCO	Alistair Woodburn
—	MF	SCO	Paul Willis (On loan from Dunfermline Athletic)
—	FW	SCO	Aaron Connelly (On loan to Girvan)
—	FW	SCO	Michael Moffat
—	FW	SCO	Roddy Paterson
—	FW	SCO	Mark Roberts (Club Captain)
—	FW	SCO	Andy Rodgers

=== Appearances ===
These statistics include League, Challenge Cup, League Cup and Scottish Cup for every player to have played for Ayr United during the 2010–11 season.

#	Player	P	Goal	Booked	Sent off (straight red)
GK	(Scotland) David Crawford	25	0	0	1
GK	(Scotland) Darryl Jones	0	0	0	0
GK	(Scotland) Alan Martin	6	0	0	0
GK	(Scotland) Ryan McWilliams	2	0	0	0
DF	(Scotland) Martyn Campbell	32	1	5	0
DF	(Scotland) Bobby Donnelly	3	0	0	0
DF	(Scotland) Iain Fisher	0	0	0	0
DF	(Scotland) Jim Lauchlan	12	1	2	0
DF	(Scotland) Eddie Malone	25	1	8	0
DF	(Scotland) Ross Robertson	21	1	3	1
DF	(Scotland) Chris Smith	30	1	3	0
MF	(Scotland) Stuart Bannigan	16	3	0	0
MF	(Scotland) David Crawford	1	0	0	0
MF	(Scotland) William Easton	26	2	5	0
MF	(Scotland) Dean Keenan	10	0	6	1
MF	(Scotland) Ryan McCann	22	3	5	0
MF	(Scotland) Stephen McKeown	6	1	2	0
MF	(Scotland) Scott McLaughlin	35	4	1	0
MF	(Scotland) Scott Taggart	7	0	1	0
MF	(Scotland) Jonathan Tiffoney	30	0	6	3
MF	(Scotland) Alan Trouten	30	4	6	1
MF	(Scotland) Alistair Woodburn	8	0	1	0
MF	(Scotland) Paul Willis	6	1	0	0
FW	(Scotland) Aaron Connelly	5	1	1	0
FW	(Scotland) Michael Moffat	14	4	1	0
FW	(Scotland) Danny McKay	13	3	0	0
FW	(Scotland) Roddy Patterson	4	0	0	0
FW	(Scotland) Stephen Reynolds	9	0	0	0
FW	(Scotland) Mark Roberts	35	23	2	1
FW	(Scotland) Andy Rodgers	30	6	3	0

== Non-Playing staff ==
- Chairman- Lachlan Cameron
- Vice Chairman- Alex Ingram
- Manager- Brian Reid
- Assistant manager- Scott MacKenzie
- Physiotherapist- Kevin MacLellan
- Fitness coach- David Johnston
- Groundsman- David Harkness
- Kit manager- Malcolm Boyle
- Programme editor- Duncan Carmichael
- Club photographer- David Sargent
- Ayr World administrator- Willie Craig
