= 2009–10 Ayr United F.C. season =

Ayr United
2009–10 season
- Chairman: Lachlan Cameron
- Manager: Brian Reid
- First Division: Tenth place (Relegated)
- Scottish Cup: Fifth round, lost to Dundee
- League Cup: Second round, lost to St Mirren
- Challenge Cup: First round, lost to Albion Rovers
- Top goalscorer: League: Mark Roberts (8); All: Mark Roberts (9)
Home colours	Away colours

The 2009–10 season was the 100th season of competitive football by Ayr United.

== Summary ==
=== Season ===
In the 2009–10 season, Ayr United celebrated their centennial year by gaining promotion to The First Division after the play-off victory at The Excelsior Stadium against Airdrie United. Ayr were promoted after a five-year stint in the Second Division. Airdrie United were later rewarded First Division status after Livingston were double-relegated to the Fourth Tier of Scottish football for financial reasons. Ayr were promoted along with Fife side Raith Rovers; the other club joining the First Division after being absent for half a decade are Inverness Caledonian Thistle, who were relegated from the SPL at the end of the 2008–09 season. Ayr United were relegated at the end of the season when they finished bottom of the league.

== Competitions ==
Win Draw Loss

=== Pre-season ===
11 July 2009 Friendly	SV Wacker Burghausen	0–3	Ayr United	Bischofshofen, Austria
				Attendance: 0

15 July 2009 Friendly	Ayr United	1–2	Unirea Urziceni	Somerset Park, Ayr
				Attendance: 970

18 July 2009 Friendly	Ayr United	0–1	St Mirren	Somerset Park, Ayr
				Attendance: 1,183

20 July 2009 Friendly	Ayr United	0–2	St Johnstone	Somerset Park, Ayr
				Attendance: 581

==== Scottish First Division ====
8 August 2009 Match 1	Ayr United	1–1	Partick Thistle	Somerset Park, Ayr
15:00	Mark Roberts			Attendance: 3,078

15 August 2009 Match 2	Inverness Caledonian Thistle	0–0	Ayr United	Caledonian Stadium, Inverness
15:00				Attendance: 3,297

22 August 2009 Match 3	Ayr United	0–2	Greenock Morton	Somerset Park, Ayr
15:00				Attendance: 2,304

29 August 2009 Match 4	Queen of the South	0–2	Ayr United	Palmerston Park, Dumfries
15:00				Attendance: 3,034

12 September 2009 Match 5	Ayr United	1–1	Airdrie United	Somerset Park, Ayr
15:00	Mark Roberts			Attendance: 1,718

19 September 2009 Match 6	Ross County	2–1	Ayr United	Victoria Park, Dingwall
15:00	Mark Roberts			Attendance: 1,885

26 September 2009 Match 7	Ayr United	1–0	Raith Rovers	Somerset Park, Ayr
15:00	Kenny Connolly			Attendance: 1,783

10 October 2009 Match 8	Dunfermline	3–1	Ayr United	East End Park, Dunfermline
15:00	Chris Aitken			Attendance: 2,460

14 October 2009 Match 9	Ayr United	2–2	Dundee	Somerset Park, Ayr
15:00	Ryan McGowan; Ryan Stevenson			Attendance: 1,710

17 October 2009 Match 10	Partick Thistle	2–0	Ayr United	Firhill Stadium, Glasgow
15:00				Attendance: 3,055

24 October 2009 Match 11	Ayr United	1–5	Inverness Caledonian Thistle	Somerset Park, Ayr
15:00	Mark Roberts			Attendance: 1,609

31 October 2009 Match 12	Airdrie United	3–1	Ayr United	Excelsior Stadium, Airdrie
15:00	Airdrie Own Goal			Attendance: 1,184

7 November 2009 Match 13	Ayr United	0–1	Queen of the South	Somerset Park, Ayr
15:00				Attendance: 2,453

14 November 2009 Match 14	Ayr United	1–1	Ross County	Somerset Park, Ayr
15:00	Mark Roberts			Attendance: 1,236

21 November 2009 Match 15	Raith Rovers	0–0	Ayr United	Stark's Park, Kirkcaldy
15:00				Attendance: 1,460

5 December 2009 Match 16	Ayr United	1–0	Dunfermline	Somerset Park, Ayr
15:00	Ryan Stevenson			Attendance: 1,625

12 December 2009 Match 17	Dundee	3–1	Ayr United	Dens Park, Dundee
15:00	Stephen Reynolds			Attendance: 4,323

23 January 2010 Match 18	Ross County	1–0	Ayr United	Victoria Park, Dingwall
15:00				Attendance: 1,935

16 February 2010 Match 19	Queen of the South	3–0	Ayr United	Palmerston Park, Dumfries
15:00				Attendance: 1,721

20 February 2010 Match 20	Dunfermline Athletic	0–1	Ayr United	East End Park, Dunfermline
15:00			Tam McManus	Attendance: 2,429

27 February 2010 Match 21	Inverness Caledonian Thistle	3–3	Ayr United	Caledonian Stadium, Inverness
15:00			Aitken; Mark Roberts; Tam McManus	Attendance: 2,843

6 March 2010 Match 22	Ayr United	2–0	Greenock Morton	Somerset Park, Ayr
15:00	Mark Roberts; Tam McManus			Attendance: 2,145

11 March 2010 Match 23	Ayr United	1–0	Partick Thistle	Somerset Park, Ayr
15:00	Steve Bowey			Attendance: 1,505

13 March 2010 Match 24	Airdrie United	1–1	Ayr United	Excelsior Stadium, Airdrie
15:00			Daniel McKay	Attendance: 1,122

17 March 2010 Match 25	Ayr United	1–1	Dundee	Somerset Park, Ayr
15:00	Daniel Lafferty			Attendance: 1,375

20 March 2010 Match 26	Ayr United	3–0	Queen of the South	Somerset Park, Ayr
15:00	Tam McManus; Daniel McKay; Mark Roberts	20 March 2010		Attendance: 2,139

27 March 2010 Match 27	Raith Rovers	1–1	Ayr United	Stark's Park, Kirkcaldy
15:00	Chris Mitchell			Attendance: 1,872

30 March 2010 Match 28	Greenock Morton	1–0	Ayr United	Cappielow, Greenock
15:00				Attendance: 1,289

3 April 2010 Match 29	Dundee	3–0	Ayr United	Dens Park, Dundee
15:00				Attendance: 4,270

7 April 2010 Match 30	Ayr United	0–2	Raith Rovers	Somerset Park, Ayr
15:00				Attendance: 1,376

10 April 2010 Match 31	Ayr United	1–2	Dunfermline Athletic	Somerset Park, Ayr
15:00	Tam McManus			Attendance: 1,367

17 April 2010 Match 32	Partick Thistle	0–1	Ayr United	Firhill Stadium, Glasgow
15:00				Attendance: 1,877

21 April 2010 Match 33	Ayr United	1–4	Airdrie United	Somerset Park, Ayr
15:00	Dean Keenan			Attendance: 1,781

24 April 2010 Match 34	Ayr United	0–7	Inverness Caledonian Thistle	Somerset Park, Ayr
15:00				Attendance: 1,804

28 April 2010 Match 35	Ayr United	0–1	Ross County	Somerset Park, Ayr
15:00				Attendance: 1,032

1 May 2010 Match 36	Greenock Morton	2–1	Ayr United	Cappielow, Greenock
15:00			McKay	Attendance: 3,771

=== Scottish Challenge Cup ===
25 July 2009 Scottish Challenge Cup round 1	Ayr United	0–2	Albion Rovers	Somerset Park, Ayr
15:00				Attendance: 979

=== Scottish League Cup ===
==== Matches ====
1 August 2009 Scottish League Cup round 1	Stirling Albion	1–2	Ayr United	Forthbank Stadium, Stirling
15:00			William Easton; Aitken	Attendance: 802

26 August 2009 Scottish League Cup round 2	Ayr United	0–2	St Mirren	Somerset Park, Ayr
15:00				Attendance: 1,652

=== Scottish Cup ===
28 November 2009 Scottish League Cup round 3	Deveronvale	0–1	Ayr United	Princess Royal Park, Banff
15:00			Ryan Stevenson	Attendance: 192

18 January 2010 Scottish League Cup round 4	Ayr United	1–0	Brechin City	Somerset Park, Ayr
15:00			Roberts	Attendance: 1,139

6 February 2010 Scottish League Cup round 5	Dundee	2–1	Ayr United	Dens Park, Dundee
15:00			McManus	Attendance: 2,852

== 2009–10 playing squad ==
Note: Flags indicate national team as defined under FIFA eligibility rules; some limited exceptions apply. Players may hold more than one non-FIFA nationality.

No.	Pos.	Nation	Player
—	GK	SCO	Stephen Grindlay
—	GK	SCO	Craig Samson
—	DF	SCO	Andy Aitken
—	DF	SCO	Martyn Campbell
—	DF	SCO	Billy Gibson
—	DF	SCO	Kevin James
—	MF	SCO	Ryan Borris
—	MF	ENG	Steve Bowey

No.	Pos.	Nation	Player
—	MF	SCO	Kenny Connolly
—	MF	SCO	William Easton
—	MF	SCO	Dean Keenan
—	MF	SCO	Alistair Woodburn
—	FW	SCO	Tam McManus
—	FW	MSR	Junior Mendes
—	FW	SCO	Mark Roberts

=== Management and staff ===
	Name	Occupation
(United States)	Lachlan Cameron	Chairman
(Scotland)	Brian Reid	Manager
(Scotland)	Scott MacKenzie	Assistant Manager
(Scotland)	Kevin MacLellan	Physio
(Scotland)	David Johnstone	Fitness Coach
(Scotland)	Dr. Kirk Russell	Club Doctor
(Scotland)	Davie Harkness	Groundsman

== Sponsorship ==
Kit Maker	Shirt sponsor(Front)	Shirt sponsor(Back)	Short sponsor
Surridge Sports	Paligap Network Solutions	Legal Service Scotland	Giles Insurance Brokers

== Goalscorers ==
	Name	Apps	Goals	
(Scotland)	Mark Roberts	26	9	FW
(Scotland)	Tam McManus	8	5	FW
(Scotland)	Ryan Stevenson	21	3	MF
(Scotland)	Daniel McKay	6	2	FW
(Scotland)	Andy Aitken	19	2	DF
(Scotland)	Chris Aitken	18	1	MF
(Australia)	Ryan McGowan	18	1	MF
(Scotland)	Kenny Connolly	23	1	MF
(Scotland)	Willie Easton	18	1	MF
(Northern Ireland)	Daniel Lafferty	4	1	DF
(England)	Steve Bowey	6	1	MF
(Scotland)	Stephen Reynolds	4	1	FW

Players in Italics have now left the club

=== Players in on loan ===
Note: Flags indicate national team as defined under FIFA eligibility rules; some limited exceptions apply. Players may hold more than one non-FIFA nationality.

No.	Pos.	Nation	Player
—	DF	NIR	Daniel Lafferty (on loan from Celtic)
—	DF	AUS	Ryan McGowan (on loan from Hearts)
—	DF	SCO	Chris Mitchell (on loan from Falkirk)
—	MF	AUS	Rocky Visconte (on loan from Hearts)
—	FW	SCO	Daniel McKay (on loan from Kilmarnock)
—	FW	SCO	Stephen Reynolds (on loan from St Johnstone)

=== Players out on loan ===
Note: Flags indicate national team as defined under FIFA eligibility rules; some limited exceptions apply. Players may hold more than one non-FIFA nationality.

No.	Pos.	Nation	Player
—	GK	SCO	David Mitchell (On Loan to Stranraer)
—	MF	SCO	Scott Agnew (On Loan to Stranraer)
—	FW	SCO	Kevin Cawley (On Loan to Stranraer)

=== Departed players ===
Note: Flags indicate national team as defined under FIFA eligibility rules; some limited exceptions apply. Players may hold more than one non-FIFA nationality.

No.	Pos.	Nation	Player
—	DF	SCO	Neil McGowan (Now At Clyde)
—	MF	SCO	David O'Brien (Now At Stirling Albion)
—	MF	SCO	Chris Aitken (Now At Stirling Albion)
—	MF	SCO	Ryan Stevenson (Now At Hearts)

No.	Pos.	Nation	Player
—	FW	SCO	Bryan Prunty (Now At Alloa Athletic)
—	FW	SCO	David Gormley (Now At Alloa Athletic)

=== Squad changes ===
Boss Brian Reid made many changes to the squad during the Close-Season, bringing in Kevin James from St Johnstone, Kevin Cawley from Celtic, Craig Samson from Hereford United, Andy Aitken from Queen of the South, Billy Gibson from Clyde and David O'Brien from Dundee (Who only played one game before joining Stirling Albion) and departing were Scott Walker to join Alloa Athletic, Murray Henderson who went to sign for Stranraer, Alex Williams moving to Irish Club Dundalk, Allan Dempsie re-joining Elgin City and goalkeeper Fraser Stewart. There were many changes to the squad throughout the course of the season bringing several loan signings such as Australian Ryan McGowan a defensive-midfielder from Hearts, Stephen Reynolds a 20-year-old striker from St Johnstone brought in for one month as an emergency loan signing, Rocky Visconte another Australian from Hearts, Chris Mitchell a Scotland Under-21 defender, Daniel McKay from local-rivals Kilmarnock and Daniel Lafferty from Celtic. Brian Reid also David Mitchell out on loan to Stranraer to the end of the season, another player to leave the club on a temporary basis was Scott Agnew who joined Alloa Athletic until January then signed for Stranraer for the duration of the season. Players leaving the club on a permanent basis were Bryan Prunty and David Gormley who both joined Alloa, Chris Aitken who re-joined previous club Stirling Albion, Neil McGowan who signed for Clyde and fans-favourite Ryan Stevenson who joined SPL club Hearts for an undisclosed fee believed to be around £10k. players joining the club included Steve Bowey from English side Bedlington Terriers, Tam McManus from Derry City and Montserrat international Junior Mendes.

== Final League Table ==
Pos	Team	Pld	W	D	L	GF	GA	GD	Pts	Promotion, qualification or relegation
6	Partick Thistle	36	14	6	16	43	40	+3	48	
7	Raith Rovers	36	11	9	16	36	47	−11	42	
8	Greenock Morton	36	11	4	21	40	65	−25	37	
9	Airdrie United (R)	36	8	9	19	41	56	−15	33	Qualification to the First Division play-offs
10	Ayr United (R)	36	7	10	19	29	60	−31	31	Relegation to the Second Division

Source: Scottish Football League
Rules for classification: 1) points; 2) goal difference; 3) number of goals scored.
First Division play-offs: The 9th place team will be entered into a play-off with the 2nd, 3rd and 4th places of the Second Division. The winner gets a place in the 2010-11 First Division
(R) Relegated

=== Scottish First Division ===
==== Results summary ====
Overall								Home						Away					
Pld	W	D	L	GF	GA	GD	Pts	W	D	L	GF	GA	GD	W	D	L	GF	GA	GD
36	7	10	19	29	60	−31	31	5	5	8	17	30	−13	2	5	11	12	30	−18

==== Results by round ====
Round	1	2	3	4	5	6	7	8	9	10	11	12	13	14	15	16	17	18	19	20	21	22	23	24	25	26	27	28	29	30	31	32	33	34	35	36
Ground	H	A	H	A	H	A	H	A	H	A	H	A	H	H	A	H	A	A	A	A	A	H	H	A	H	H	A	A	A	H	H	A	H	H	H	A
Result	D	D	L	L	D	L	W	L	D	L	L	L	L	D	D	W	L	L	L	W	D	W	W	D	D	W	D	L	L	L	L	W	L	L	L	L
Position	4	7	9	10	9	9	7	8	9	9	9	10	10	9	9	9	9	8	9	9	10	10	10	9	9	9	9	9	9	9	9	10	10	10	10	10

Updated to match(es) played on 2 May 2020. Source:
A = Away; H = Home; W = Win; D = Draw; L = Loss
