= 2010–11 Clyde F.C. season =

Clyde
2010–11 season
- Chairman: John Alexander
- Manager: Stuart Millar
- Stadium: Broadwood Stadium
- Scottish Third Division: 10th
- Scottish Cup: Second Round
- League Cup: Second Round
- Challenge Cup: First Round
| Home colours | Away colours |

Season 2010–11 will see Clyde compete in the Scottish Third Division following relegation from the Scottish Second Division.

== Notable events ==
- May: Clyde begin to shape their squad for life in the Third Division, with goalkeeper Scott Findlay, midfielder Marvyn Wilson and winger Conn Boyle being told their contracts will not be renewed. Connor Cassidy and Jay Lang are also released, whilst Latvian duo Dmitrijs Borisovs and Aleksandrs Gramovics return home after their contracts expire. Jordan Allan, Neil McGowan, Ally Park, Connor Stevenson and John Stewart all sign new contracts for the forthcoming season, but Alan Lithgow, Kevin Higgins and Steven Howarth reject new deals and leave the club. Willie Sawyers re-signs on a new one-year deal after original contract discussions had broken down. Goalkeeper Calum Reidford and midfielder Willie McLachlan reject new contract offers and therefore leave the club. The club strengthen their squad by bringing in Haydn Cochrane, Murray Henderson, Graham Girvan, Marc McCusker and JC Hutchinson.
- June: John Sweeney becomes Clyde's sixth new signing after signing on from Pollok. Pollok striker Brian Dingwall has been rumoured to be joining the squad for Pre-Season training.
- August: Steven Howarth joins Motherwell for an undisclosed compensation sum on 31 August 2010.

== Squad ==
Note: Flags indicate national team as defined under FIFA eligibility rules; some limited exceptions apply. Players may hold more than one non-FIFA nationality.

| No. | Pos. | Nation | Player |
|---|---|---|---|
| — | GK | SCO | Jordan Allan |
| — | GK | SCO | JC Hutchinson |
| — | DF | SCO | Graham Girvan |
| — | DF | SCO | Murray Henderson |
| — | DF | SCO | Neil McGowan |
| — | DF | SCO | Ally Park |
| — | MF | SCO | Haydn Cochrane |

| No. | Pos. | Nation | Player |
|---|---|---|---|
| — | MF | SCO | Connor Stevenson |
| — | MF | SCO | Adam Strachan |
| — | MF | SCO | John Sweeney |
| — | FW | SCO | Marc McCusker |
| — | FW | SCO | Willie Sawyers |
| — | FW | SCO | John Stewart |

== Results ==
- Scores are shown Clyde first.

| Date | Opponents | Competition | Home/Away | Kick-off time | Result | Attendance | Match Report |
|---|---|---|---|---|---|---|---|
| 17/07/2010 | Ross County | Friendly | Away | 3:00pm | 2–3 | - | Clyde FC |
| 20/07/2010 | Everton XI | Friendly | Home | 7:45pm | 2–2 | 576 | Clyde FC |
| 24/07/2010 | Partick Thistle | SCC | Away | 3:00pm | 1–2 | 1,759 | Clyde FC |
| 28/07/2010 | Camelon Juniors | Friendly | Away | 7:15pm | 1–1 | - | - |
| 31/07/2010 | Cowdenbeath | SLC | Home | 3:00pm | 2–1 | 667 | Clyde FC |
| 04/08/2010 | Rangers | Friendly | Home | 7:45pm | 1–2 | 2,687 | Rangers FC |
| 07/08/2010 | Stranraer | Third Division | Home | 3:00pm | 2–2 | 827 | Clyde FC |
| 14/08/2010 | Queen's Park | Third Division | Away | 3:00pm | 1–0 | 1,074 | Clyde FC |
| 21/08/2010 | Berwick Rangers | Third Division | Home | 3:00pm | 1–4 | 898 | Clyde FC |
| 24/08/2010 | Dunfermline Athletic | SLC | Away | 7:45pm | 2–3 | 1,107 | Clyde FC |
| 28/08/2010 | Albion Rovers | Third Division | Home | 3:00pm | 1–2 | 1,014 | Clyde FC |
| 11/09/2010 | East Stirlingshire | Third Division | Away | 3:00pm | 0–0 | 532 | Clyde FC |
| 18/09/2010 | Annan Athletic | Third Division | Home | 3:00pm | 0–2 | 1,043 | Clyde FC |
| 25/09/2010 | Montrose | Third Division | Away | 3:00pm | 1–8 | 424 | Clyde FC |
| 02/10/2010 | Elgin City | Third Division | Home | 3:00pm | 1–1 | 881 | Clyde FC |
| 16/10/2010 | Arbroath | Third Division | Away | 3:00pm | 2–3 | 481 | Clyde FC |
| 23/10/2010 | Berwick Rangers | SC | Home | 3:00pm | 1–2 | 534 | Clyde FC |
| 30/10/2010 | Albion Rovers | Third Division | Away | 3:00pm | 1–3 | 473 | Clyde FC |
| 06/11/2010 | East Stirlingshire | Third Division | Home | 3:00pm | 1–2 | 652 | Clyde FC |
| 13/11/2010 | Berwick Rangers | Third Division | Away | 3:00pm | 1–2 | 432 | Clyde FC |
| 15/01/2011 | East Stirlingshire | Third Division | Away | 3:00pm | 0–2 | 467 | Clyde FC |
| 29/01/2011 | Montrose | Third Division | Away | 3:00pm | 1–3 | 422 | Clyde FC |
| 05/02/2011 | Annan Athletic | Third Division | Home | 3:00pm | 0–2 | 610 | Clyde FC |
| 12/02/2011 | Elgin City | Third Division | Home | 3:00pm | 3–3 | 600 | Clyde FC |
| 15/02/2011 | Berwick Rangers | Third Division | Home | 7:45pm | 2–0 | 385 | Clyde FC |
| 22/02/2011 | Albion Rovers | Third Division | Home | 7:45pm | 0–1 | 507 | Clyde FC |
| 26/02/2011 | Stranraer | Third Division | Home | 3:00pm | 4–2 | 703 | Clyde FC |
| 01/03/2011 | Stranraer | Third Division | Away | 7:45pm | 1–3 | 307 | Clyde FC |
| 05/03/2011 | Queen's Park | Third Division | Away | 3:00pm | 0–4 | 1,148 | Clyde FC |
| 08/03/2011 | Queen's Park | Third Division | Home | 7:45pm | 2–3 | 502 | Clyde FC |
| 19/03/2011 | Albion Rovers | Third Division | Away | 3:00pm | 1–1 | 523 | Clyde FC |
| 22/03/2011 | Arbroath | Third Division | Home | 7:45pm | 1–1 | 532 | Clyde FC |
| 26/03/2011 | Montrose | Third Division | Home | 3:00pm | 2–0 | 725 | Clyde FC |
| 29/03/2011 | Annan Athletic | Third Division | Away | 7:30pm | 2–0 | 465 | Clyde FC |
| 02/04/2011 | Annan Athletic | Third Division | Away | 3:00pm | 0–1 | 585 | Clyde FC |
| 05/04/2011 | Montrose | Third Division | Home | 7:45pm | 1–1 | 516 | Clyde FC |
| 09/04/2011 | Arbroath | Third Division | Home | 3:00pm | 0–3 | 755 | Clyde FC |
| 13/04/2011 | Arbroath | Third Division | Away | 7:45pm | 0–2 | 604 | Clyde FC |
| 16/04/2011 | Elgin City | Third Division | Away | 3:00pm | 1–0 | 621 | Clyde FC |
| 19/04/2011 | East Stirlingshire | Third Division | Home | 7:45pm | 2–0 | 591 | Clyde FC |
| 23/04/2011 | Berwick Rangers | Third Division | Away | 3:00pm | 1–1 | 427 | Clyde FC |
| 26/04/2011 | Elgin City | Third Division | Away | 7:45pm | 1–0 | 272 | Clyde FC |
| 30/04/2011 | Queen's Park | Third Division | Home | 3:00pm | 0–2 | 1,021 | Clyde FC |
| 07/05/2011 | Stranraer | Third Division | Away | 3:00pm | 0–3 | 439 | Clyde FC |

== Player statistics ==
=== Overall ===
| # | Player | P | Goal | Booked | Sent off (straight red) |
|---|---|---|---|---|---|
| GK | (Scotland) Jordan Allan | 0 | 0 | 0 | 0 |
| GK | (Scotland) JC Hutchinson | 0 | 0 | 0 | 0 |
| DF | (Scotland) Neil McGowan | 0 | 0 | 0 | 0 |
| DF | (Scotland) Murray Henderson | 0 | 0 | 0 | 0 |
| DF | (Scotland) Ally Park | 0 | 0 | 0 | 0 |
| DF | (Scotland) Graham Girvan | 0 | 0 | 0 | 0 |
| MF | (Scotland) Haydn Cochrane | 0 | 0 | 0 | 0 |
| MF | (Scotland) Connor Stevenson | 0 | 0 | 0 | 0 |
| MF | (Scotland) John Sweeney | 0 | 0 | 0 | 0 |
| MF | (Scotland) Adam Strachan | 0 | 0 | 0 | 0 |
| FW | (Scotland) John Stewart | 0 | 0 | 0 | 0 |
| FW | (Scotland) Marc McCusker | 0 | 0 | 0 | 0 |
| FW | (Scotland) Willie Sawyers | 0 | 0 | 0 | 0 |

== League table ==
| Pos | Team | Pld | W | D | L | GF | GA | GD | Pts |
|---|---|---|---|---|---|---|---|---|---|
| 6 | Berwick Rangers | 36 | 12 | 13 | 11 | 62 | 56 | +6 | 49 |
| 7 | Elgin City | 36 | 13 | 6 | 17 | 53 | 63 | −10 | 45 |
| 8 | Montrose | 36 | 10 | 7 | 19 | 47 | 61 | −14 | 37 |
| 9 | East Stirlingshire | 36 | 10 | 4 | 22 | 33 | 62 | −29 | 34 |
| 10 | Clyde | 36 | 8 | 8 | 20 | 37 | 67 | −30 | 32 |

Source: SPFL
Rules for classification: 1) points; 2) goal difference; 3) number of goals scored.

== Transfers ==
=== In ===
| Player | From | Fee | Date |
|---|---|---|---|
| (Scotland) Haydn Cochrane | Celtic | Free | 21 May 2010 |
| (Scotland) Murray Henderson | Ayr United | Free | 22 May 2010 |
| (Scotland) Graham Girvan | Ross County | Free | 25 May 2010 |
| (Scotland) Marc McCusker | Albion Rovers | Free | 25 May 2010 |
| (Scotland) John Charles "JC" Hutchinson | Camelon | Free | 28 May 2010 |
| (Scotland) John Sweeney | Pollok | Free | 2 June 2010 |

=== Out ===
| Player | To | Fee | Date |
|---|---|---|---|
| (Scotland) Conn Boyle | Released | Free | 1 May 2010 |
| (Scotland) Scott Findlay | Released | Free | 1 May 2010 |
| (Scotland) Marvyn Wilson | Released | Free | 1 May 2010 |
| (Scotland) Connor Cassidy | Released | Free | 7 May 2010 |
| (Scotland) Jay Lang | Released | Free | 7 May 2010 |
| (Latvia) Aleksandrs Gramovics | Released | Free | 7 May 2010 |
| (Latvia) Dmitrijs Borisovs | Released | Free | 7 May 2010 |
| (Scotland) Alan Lithgow | Released | Free | 16 May 2010 |
| (Scotland) Kevin Higgins | Released | Free | 16 May 2010 |
| (Scotland) Calum Reidford | Released | Free | 31 May 2010 |
| (Scotland) Willie McLachlan | Released | Free | 31 May 2010 |
| (Scotland) Steven Howarth | Motherwell | Undisclosed | 31 August 2010 |
