= 2008–09 Ayr United F.C. season =

Ayr United
2008–09 season
- Chairman: Lachlan Cameron
- Manager: Brian Reid
- Second Division: Runners-up (Promoted)
- Scottish Cup: Fourth round
- League Cup: Second Rund
- Challenge Cup: First round
Home colours	Away colours

The 2008–09 season is the 99th season of competitive football by Ayr United.

== Fixtures ==
Win Draw Loss

=== Preseason ===
10 July 2008 Friendly	Ayr United	1–2	Partick Thistle	Somerset Park, Ayr

12 July 2008 Friendly	Greenock Morton	0–1	Ayr United	Cappielow, Greenock

15 July 2008 Friendly	Ayr United	0–3	Queen of the South	Somerset Park, Ayr

19 July 2008 Friendly	Crusaders	1–2	Ayr United	Seaview, Belfast

Last updated: 2011.
Source: ayr-united.co.uk

=== Scottish Second Division ===
2 August 2008 Match 1	Ayr United	0–0	Raith Rovers	Somerset Park, Ayr
15:00

9 August 2008 Match 2	Alloa Athletic	0–2	Ayr United	Recreation Park, Alloa

16 August 2008 Match 3	Ayr United	2–1	Arbroath	Somerset Park, Ayr

23 August 2008 Match 4	Stirling Albion	2–2	Ayr United	Forthbank Stadium, Stirling

30 August 2008 Match 5	Ayr United	2–1	Queen's Park	Somerset Park, Ayr

13 September 2008 Match 6	Stranraer	1–3	Ayr United	Stair Park, Stranraer

21 September 2008 Match 7	Ayr United	1–1	Brechin City	Somerset Park, Ayr

27 September 2008 Match 8	East Fife	3–0	Ayr United	Bayview Stadium, Methil

4 October 2008 Match 9	Ayr United	2–0	Peterhead	Somerset Park, Ayr

18 October 2008 Match 10	Raith Rovers	3–2	Ayr United	Stark's Park, Kirkcaldy

25 October 2008 Match 11	Ayr United	1–1	Stirling Albion	Somerset Park, Ayr

1 November 2008 Match 12	Arbroath	0–3	Ayr United	Gayfield Park, Arbroath

8 November 2008 Match 13	Ayr United	3–2	Stranraer	Somerset Park, Ayr

15 November 2008 Match 14	Queen's Park	0–3	Ayr United	Hampden Park, Glasgow

22 November 2008 Match 15	Ayr United	4–2	East Fife	Somerset Park, Ayr

13 December 2008 Match 16	Ayr United	3–0	Alloa Athletic	Somerset Park, Ayr

20 December 2008 Match 17	Peterhead	3–0	Ayr United	Balmoor Stadium, Peterhead

30 December 2008 Match 18	Brechin City	0–1	Ayr United	Glebe Park, Brechin

17 January 2009 Match 19	Stirling Albion	2–0	Ayr United	Forthbank Stadium, Stirling

25 January 2009 Match 20	Ayr United	2–1	Arbroath	Somerset Park, Ayr

31 January 2009 Match 21	Ayr United	2–2	Raith Rovers	Somerset Park, Ayr

7 February 2009 Match 22	Alloa Athletic	3–2	Ayr United	Recreation Park, Alloa

21 February 2009 Match 23	Ayr United	4–2	Brechin City	Somerset Park, Ayr

28 February 2009 Match 24	Queen's Park	0–3	Ayr United	Hampden Park, Glasgow

4 March 2009 Match 25	Ayr United	1–1	Queen's Park	Somerset Park, Ayr

7 March 2009 Match 26	Ayr United	5–0	Stranraer	Somerset Park, Ayr

14 March 2009 Match 27	Raith Rovers	0–1	Ayr United	Stark's Park, Kirkcaldy

18 March 2009 Match 28	East Fife	0–1	Ayr United	Bayview Stadium, Methil

21 March 2009 Match 29	Ayr United	0–0	Peterhead	Somerset Park, Ayr

28 March 2009 Match 30	Stranraer	1–4	Ayr United	Stair Park, Stranraer

4 April 2009 Match 31	Ayr United	3–1	Stirling Albion	Somerset Park, Ayr

11 April 2009 Match 32	Arbroath	1–3	Ayr United	Gayfield Park, Arbroath

18 April 2009 Match 33	Brechin City	1–0	Ayr United	Glebe Park, Brechin

25 April 2009 Match 34	Ayr United	2–0	East Fife	Somerset Park, Ayr

2 May 2009 Match 35	Ayr United	1–1	Alloa Athletic	Somerset Park, Ayr

9 May 2009 Match 36	Peterhead	2–3	Ayr United	Balmoor Stadium, Peterhead

Last updated: 2011.
Source: ayr-united.co.uk

=== Scottish Challenge Cup ===
27 July 2008 Round 1	East Stirlingshire	2–1	Ayr United	Ochilview Park, Stenhousemuir
				Attendance: 761

Last updated: 2011.
Source: ayr-united.co.uk

=== Scottish League Cup ===
6 August 2008 Scottish league cup - Round 1	Ayr United	2–1	Berwick Rangers	Somerset Park, Ayr
				Attendance: 746

27 August 2008 Scottish league cup - Round 2	Ayr United	0–1	Aberdeen	Somerset Park, Ayr
				Attendance: 2,979

Last updated: 2011.
Source: ayr-united.co.uk

=== Scottish Cup ===
17 December 2008 Round 3	Lochee United	1–1	Ayr United	Thomson Park, Dundee
				Attendance: 1,223

23 December 2008 Round 3 (Replay)	Ayr United	3–1	Lochee United	Somerset Park, Ayr
				Attendance: 2,049

10 January 2009 Round 4	Ayr United	2–2	Kilmarnock	Somerset Park, Ayr
				Attendance: 9,280

22 January 2009 Round 4 (Replay)	Kilmarnock	3–1	Ayr United	Rugby Park, Kilmarnock
				Attendance: 11,563

Last updated: 2011.
Source: ayr-united.co.uk

=== First Division play-offs ===
==== Semi-final ====
13 May 2009 First leg	Brechin City	0–2	Ayr United	Glebe Park, Brechin
19:45		Report	Aitken 8' 36' (pen.)	Attendance: 902; Referee: B. Winter

16 May 2009 Second leg	Ayr United	3–2	Brechin City	Somerset Park, Ayr
15:00	Prunty 15'; Connolly 70'; Aitken 72'	Report	McAllister 38' 53' (pen.)	Attendance: 1,974; Referee: C. Allan

==== Final ====
20 May 2009 First leg	Ayr United	2–2	Airdrie United	Somerset Park, Ayr
19:45	Roberts 48' 67'	Report	di Giacomo 30'; Baird 43'	Attendance: 3,378; Referee: E. Smith

24 May 2009 Second leg	Airdrie United	0–1	Ayr United	New Broomfield, Airdrie
15:15		Report	Stevenson 29'	Attendance: 3,303; Referee: I Brines

Last updated: 2011.
Source: Wikipedia Article

== Stats ==
=== League table ===
Pos	Team	Pld	W	D	L	GF	GA	GD	Pts	Promotion, qualification or relegation
1	Raith Rovers (C, P)	36	22	10	4	60	27	+33	76	Promotion to the First Division
2	Ayr United (P)	36	22	8	6	71	38	+33	74	Qualification for the First Division Play-offs (Note: The 2nd, 3rd and 4th placed teams will be entered into a play-off with the First Division's 9th placed team. The winning team will be awarded a place in the 2009–10 First Division)
3	Brechin City	36	18	8	10	51	45	+6	62	Qualification for the First Division Play-offs
4	Peterhead	36	15	11	10	54	39	+15	56	Qualification for the First Division Play-offs
5	Stirling Albion	36	14	11	11	59	49	+10	53	

Source: BBC Sport
Rules for classification: 1) points; 2) goal difference; 3) number of goals scored.
(C) Champions; (P) Promoted

=== Results summary ===
Overall								Home						Away					
Pld	W	D	L	GF	GA	GD	Pts	W	D	L	GF	GA	GD	W	D	L	GF	GA	GD
36	22	8	6	71	38	+33	74	11	7	0	38	16	+22	11	1	6	33	22	+11

Last updated: 2011.
Source: Wikipedia article

=== Results by round ===
Round	1	2	3	4	5	6	7	8	9	10	11	12	13	14	15	16	17	18	19	20	21	22	23	24	25	26	27	28	29	30	31	32	33	34	35	36
Ground	H	A	H	A	H	A	H	A	H	A	H	A	H	A	H	H	A	A	A	H	H	A	H	A	H	H	A	A	H	A	H	A	A	H	H	A
Result	D	W	W	D	W	W	D	L	W	L	D	W	W	W	W	W	L	W	L	W	D	L	W	W	D	W	W	W	D	W	W	W	L	W	D	W
Position	6	4	1	1	1	1	1	3	2	3	3	3	3	3	3	2	2	2	2	2	2	2	2	2	1	1	1	1	1	1	1	1	2	2	2	2

Source: Statto.com
A = Away; H = Home; W = Win; D = Draw; L = Loss
