= William McLachlan =

William McLachlan may refer to:

- William McLachlan (figure skater), Canadian ice dancer
- William McLachlan (footballer) (born 1989), Scottish footballer
