= Ryan Stevenson (footballer) =

Scottish footballer (born 1984)

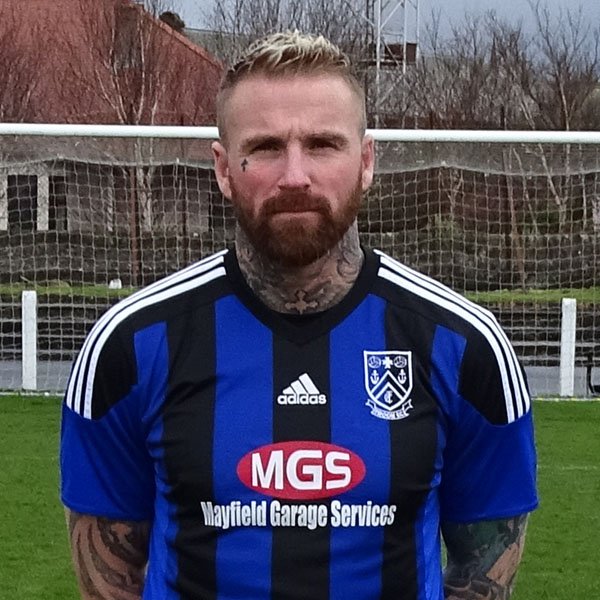

Personal information
- Full name: Ryan Cairns Stevenson
- Date of birth: 24 August 1984 (age 42)
- Place of birth: Drongan, Scotland
- Position: Attacking midfielder

Youth career
- 1997–1998: Heart of Midlothian
- 1998–2002: Chelsea

Senior career*
Years	Team	Apps	(Gls)
2002–2007	St Johnstone	74	(5)
2006	→ Ayr United (loan)	9	(2)
2007–2010	Ayr United	99	(28)
2010–2012	Heart of Midlothian	61	(9)
2012	Ipswich Town	11	(1)
2012–2014	Heart of Midlothian	55	(12)
2014–2016	Partick Thistle	39	(6)
2015	→ Ayr United (loan)	3	(0)
2016	Ayr United	15	(6)
2016	Dumbarton	17	(3)
2017	Raith Rovers	9	(1)
2017	Troon	1	(0)
2017	Annan Athletic	3	(0)
2018–2019	Troon	50	(26)
2020	Stranraer	8	(2)
2020–2021	Troon	9	(2)
2021–2022	Albion Rovers	14	(2)
2022	Troon		

Managerial career
- 2022–2023: Glenafton Athletic
- * Club domestic league appearances and goals

Ryan Cairns Stevenson (born 24 August 1984) is a Scottish former professional footballer who played as an attacking midfielder or forward. Over his career, he played for several clubs in Scotland and England, most notably with Heart of Midlothian where he had two separate spells and was part of the team that reached the 2012 Scottish Cup Final.

Stevenson began his career at St Johnstone before moving to Ayr United, where he impressed with his performances. His success led to a transfer to Heart of Midlothian in 2010, where he became a key player. He later played for Ipswich Town in England before returning to Scotland, featuring for clubs such as Partick Thistle, Ayr United, and Dumbarton. Known for his versatility, Stevenson contributed both in midfield and attack, gaining a reputation for his powerful shooting and creative play.

After retiring from professional football, Stevenson transitioned into junior and non-league football, as well as media work, occasionally providing analysis on Scottish football.

== Personal life ==
Stevenson was born in Irvine, Ayrshire, and was a boyhood Ayr United fan, as stated on BBC Scotland. He was a pupil at Drongan Primary School and Kyle Academy in Ayr.

In April 2013, Stevenson was banned from driving for a period of 20 months, following an arrest for drink driving. He later apologised for the incident, stating: "I accept the consequences of my actions. I acknowledge that I am a role model for younger supporters and team-mates and as such, my serious error of judgement was not befitting of such a position."

== Career ==
=== Chelsea ===
Stevenson began his career as a youth player at Chelsea's youth academy, staying in the same club accommodation as John Terry. He has since stated that "being a YTS at Chelsea was the best time in my life" as he was boot-boy for first-team players Jimmy Floyd Hasselbaink and Gianfranco Zola.

Stevenson played in a youth team alongside Carlton Cole, Lenny Pidgeley, Leon Knight and, in his last season, Robert Huth under the watchful eye of manager Steve Clarke.

After making eight reserve-team appearances for Chelsea, scoring one goal, he was released in May 2002.

=== St Johnstone ===
After leaving Chelsea, Stevenson was signed for St Johnstone by Billy Stark. Stevenson made 74 league appearances for Saints, before eventually falling out of favour under Owen Coyle during 2006.

=== Ayr United ===
Robert Connor brought Stevenson home to Ayr United, the team he had supported as a boy, initially on a 28-day loan in October 2006. This loan was later extended until the end of the year. He then joined the club on a permanent basis during January 2007, for a five-figure sum, against the wishes of his St. Johnstone boss: "I have told Ryan I don't want to lose him but that I wouldn't stand in his way," Coyle told Saints' website. Just two weeks later, Stevenson scored an equaliser for Ayr United against his former club, St Johnstone, in the third round of the Scottish Cup in a 2–1 defeat. Stevenson scored the goal which promoted Ayr United to the First Division in 2009, in a 1–0 win over Airdrie United in the second leg of the First Division play-off Final at New Broomfield.

=== Hearts ===
Stevenson signed for Hearts on 1 February 2010 for an undisclosed five-figure sum, with Rocky Visconte going the other way on loan. He made his debut for Hearts on 10 February playing the full 90 minutes in a 2–0 defeat to Celtic at Celtic Park. He went on to score his first competitive goal for Hearts against Inverness Caledonian Thistle in a Scottish Premier League fixture on 18 September 2010. In the absence of Kevin Kyle, Stevenson was predominantly used as a makeshift striker and scored several notable goals, such as in wins over both halves of the Old Firm and two against Edinburgh rivals Hibernian. In June 2011 Stevenson signed a one-year contract extension to extend his stay at the club.

On 22 December 2011 with Hearts in financial difficulty and having problems paying wages Stevenson requested his contract be terminated; this was refused and Stevenson advised the club he would not play or train again until his salary was paid in full. Stevenson cited stress on his unborn baby as one of the reasons behind his decision. Despite being paid Stevenson did not return to training. Several clubs including Ayr United, Crawley Town and Dundee United were interested however Hearts were seeking £100,000 for their exiled player. Hearts pledged to open a disciplinary hearing if he did not leave during the transfer window.

=== Ipswich Town ===
On 28 January 2012, Championship side Ipswich Town announced that he was set to join them in a deal worth £50,000 which was concluded on 30 January. He was given the number 16 shirt, and had signed an 18-month contract.

Stevenson scored his first goal for Ipswich on 28 April 2012 against Doncaster Rovers on the final day of the 2011–12 Football League Championship with a long-range effort which was later voted as Ipswich Town fans Goal of the Year.

=== Hearts return ===
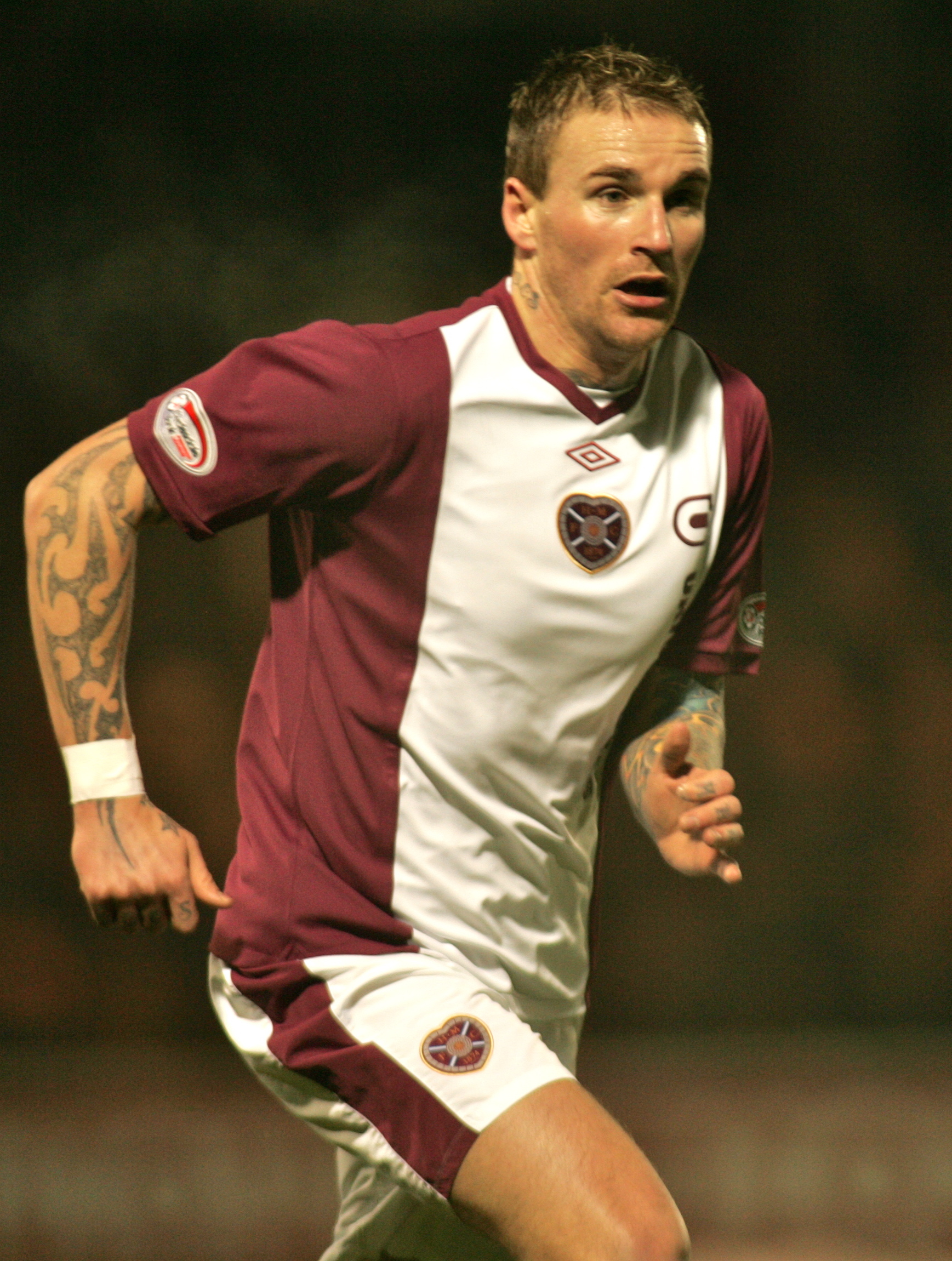
Stevenson playing for Hearts

On 31 August 2012, after just eight months at Ipswich Town, Hearts re-signed Stevenson on a three-year contract, despite interest from Motherwell. Stevenson scored both Hearts goals in the 2013 Scottish League Cup Final, but ultimately the club lost 3–2 to St Mirren. Stevenson was released by Hearts after the club was relegated to the Scottish Championship in 2014.

=== Partick Thistle ===
Stevenson signed for Partick Thistle in June 2014 on a two-year contract, with an option for a third year. He scored his first two goals for Thistle in a 2–0 Scottish Cup win over Hamilton Academical on 29 November 2014. He scored his first and second league goals in a Scottish Premiership 4–0 away win against Inverness On 31 October 2015, Stevenson had to play as goalkeeper for the last five minutes of a 4–0 defeat to Hearts because Thistle 'keeper Ryan Scully had been sent off and Thistle had already used all of their substitutions. Stevenson's first goal of the 2015–16 season was a 90th-minute winner in a 2–1 victory over Inverness Caledonian Thistle. Stevenson was released by the club in January 2016.

=== Ayr United return ===
In December 2015, Stevenson signed a short-term loan deal with his former club Ayr United. He made three appearances for Ayr before returning to Partick Thistle. However, subsequent to his release by the Firhill side, Stevenson signed again with Ayr in January 2016, his fourth separate spell with the side. After achieving promotion to the Scottish Championship via the play-offs, Stevenson chose not to renew his contract at Somerset Park.

=== Dumbarton ===
Shortly after leaving Ayr United, Stevenson signed for Scottish Championship side Dumbarton. He scored his first goal for the club in a 3–3 draw with Peterhead in July 2016. He left the club in December 2016

=== Raith Rovers ===
He joined Raith Rovers in January 2017 Stevenson hit the headlines after being forced to play a full 90 minutes in goal, after injuries to Raith's three first team goalkeepers. Rovers lost the match 1–0 to Ayr United

In March 2017, just over a week after playing in goals, Stevenson announced his shock retirement from professional football at the age of 32 as he sought a long-term career outside of football.

=== Troon and Australia ===
After leaving Raith Rovers in March 2017 to start a long-term career outside of football, Stevenson signed for Troon.

With his personal life in turmoil, and after just one appearance and two weeks with the club, Stevenson announced he was to emigrate and he signed for Australian State League Division 2 South-East side Peninsula Strikers. However, the day he was due to leave for Australia he announced he had cancelled the agreement for family reasons.

=== Annan Athletic ===
Stevenson joined Scottish League Two side Annan Athletic in June 2017, managed by his former Ayr United teammate Peter Murphy. Stevenson played eight matches before an old injury flared up and he decided to take a step back from the game to concentrate on family and work commitments.

=== Troon ===
Stevenson rejoined Troon in November 2018 after more than a year out of the game, and he said the move gave him "his love of football back" thanks to the club's Manager Jimmy Kirkwood.

The move to Portland Park proved a fruitful one for Stevenson, playing alongside former team-mates Christian Nade and Dean Keenan, and he netted 26 times in 50 appearances playing in an attacking midfield or forward role.

=== Stranraer ===
With a new-found hunger for football again, Stevenson got the opportunity to return to senior football and he joined Stranraer in January 2020.

A part of the lure to Stranraer was their upcoming match against Rangers at Ibrox Park in the Scottish Cup, a possible final chance to play in front of 38,000 supporters and his family.

=== Troon return ===
Stevenson returned to Troon for a third time in May 2020.

=== Albion Rovers ===
In March 2021, Stevenson signed for Scottish League Two side Albion Rovers.

=== Fourth return to Troon ===
On September 1, 2022, Stevenson returned for the fourth - and final - time to Troon. However, it was short-lived as the club confirmed on November 17, 2022 that Stevenson had chosen to leave the club again.

== International call-up ==
On 6 November 2011, Stevenson was called up to the Scotland squad for the first time as a late inclusion for a friendly match against Cyprus.

== Coaching career ==
His first and most recent role as manager was that of West of Scotland Football League side Glenafton Athletic, a role he resigned from on 28 August 2023. During his spell he saved the club from relegation and made the Scottish Junior Cup semi finals. His position was filled by the club's assistant manager Mark Roberts.

== Career statistics ==
As of 22 October 2017

Appearances and goals by club, season and competition
Club	Season	League			FA Cup		League Cup		Europe		Other (Note: Includes other competitive competitions, including the Scottish Challenge Cup and Scottish First Division play-offs)		Total	
Club	Season	Division	Apps	Goals	Apps	Goals	Apps	Goals	Apps	Goals	Apps	Goals	Apps	Goals
St Johnstone	2002–03	First Division	14	0	0	0	2	0	–		2 (Note: Appearances in the Scottish Challenge Cup)	1	18	1
St Johnstone	2003–04	First Division	13	0	0	0	1	0	–		2	0	16	0
St Johnstone	2004–05	First Division	10	0	0	0	1	0	–		1	0	12	0
St Johnstone	2005–06	First Division	35	5	1	0	2	0	–		1	0	39	5
St Johnstone	2006–07	First Division	2	0	0	0	2	1	–		3	0	7	1
St Johnstone	Total		74	5	1	0	8	1	–		9	1	92	7
Ayr United (loan)	2006–07	Second Division	9	2	1	0	0	0	–		0	0	10	2
Ayr United	2006–07	Second Division	15	1	1	1	0	0	–		0	0	16	2
Ayr United	2007–08	Second Division	33	15	1	0	1	0	–		4	2	39	17
Ayr United	2008–09	Second Division	34	10	4	0	2	0	–		3 (Note: One appearance in the Scottish Challenge Cup; two appearances and a goal in the First Division play-offs)	1	43	11
Ayr United	2009–10	First Division	17	2	2	1	2	0	–		1	0	22	3
Ayr United	Total		108	30	9	2	5	0	–		8	3	130	35
Heart of Midlothian	2009–10	Premier League	11	0	0	0	0	0	0	0	0	0	11	0
Heart of Midlothian	2010–11	Premier League	31	7	1	0	2	0	0	0	0	0	34	7
Heart of Midlothian	2011–12	Premier League	19	2	0	0	0	0	3 (Note: Appearances in the Europa League)	2	0	0	22	4
Heart of Midlothian	Total		61	9	1	0	2	0	3	2	0	0	67	11
Ipswich Town	2011–12	EFL Championship	11	1	0	0	0	0	–		0	0	11	1
Ipswich Town	2012–13	EFL Championship	0	0	0	0	2	0	–		0	0	2	0
Ipswich Town	Total		11	1	0	0	2	0	–		0	0	13	1
Heart of Midlothian	2012–13	Premier League	29	5	1	0	3	2	0	0	0	0	33	7
Heart of Midlothian	2013–14	Premiership	26	7	1	0	2	1	0	0	0	0	29	8
Heart of Midlothian	Total		55	12	2	0	5	3	0	0	0	0	62	15
Partick Thistle	2014–15	Premiership	31	5	2	2	2	0	0	0	0	0	35	7
Partick Thistle	2015–16	Premiership	10	1	0	0	1	0	0	0	0	0	11	1
Partick Thistle	Total		41	6	2	2	3	0	0	0	0	0	46	8
Ayr United	2015–16	League One	21	6	0	0	0	0	–		0	0	21	6
Dumbarton	2016–17	Premiership	17	3	2	0	4	1	0	0	1	0	24	4
Raith Rovers	2016–17	Premiership	9	1	0	0	0	0	0	0	0	0	9	1
Annan Athletic	2017–18	League Two	3	0	0	0	4	0	–		1	0	8	0
Stranraer	2019–20	League One	8	2	1	0	0	0	–		1	0	8	0
Career Total			408	75	18	4	33	5	3	2	19	4	426	80

== Achievements ==
- St Johnstone
  - Scottish First Division: runner-up 2005–06
  - Scottish Challenge Cup: winner 2007–08 (Note: Stevenson played in three matches in the Scottish Challenge Cup in 2007–08, before leaving to join Ayr United in October 2007.)
- Ayr United
  - Scottish Second Division / League One (2): runner-up 2008–09, 2015–16
  - Scottish First Division / Championship Play-offs (2): winner 2009, 2016
- Heart of Midlothian
  - Scottish Premier League: third-place 2010–11
  - Scottish League Cup: runner-up 2012–13
