= Aaron Connolly =

Aaron Connolly may refer to:

- Aaron Connolly (Irish footballer) (born 2000), plays for Leyton Orient
- Aaron Connolly (Scottish footballer) (born 1991), plays for East Kilbride Thistle
