= Martyn Campbell (footballer) =

Scottish footballer

Personal information
- Date of birth: 17 January 1981 (age 45)
- Position: Defender

Team information
- Current team: Kilwinning Rangers

Youth career
- Kingsmead Boys Club
- Valspar Boys Club

Senior career*
Years	Team	Apps	(Gls)
- Tarff Rovers
- Kello Rovers
- Irvine Meadow
2005–2015	Ayr United	171	(2)
2015–	Kilwinning Rangers		
- * Club domestic league appearances and goals as of 23:26, 1 June 2015 (UTC)

Martyn Campbell is a Scottish footballer who plays for Kilwinning Rangers in Scottish League One as a defender.

== Early career ==
Martyn began his youth career with Kingsmead Boys Club, before then moving on to Valspar Boys Club. Campbell then made the move to Tarff Rovers in the South of Scotland League before signing for Junior side Kello Rovers. It was at Kello that Campbell first caught the eye of Irvine Meadow manager Robert Reilly, who then signed Campbell and then brought him to Ayr United with him in 2005 after Reilly was appointed Robert Connor's new assistant manager at the club.

== Ayr United ==
In 2005, Campbell followed his former manager, Robert Reilly, to Somerset Park and in his first season he made 23 appearances in all competitions. In his second season, Campbell was a first team regular making another 21 appearances. In Campbell's third season he only featured in 12 games, due to injury, which unfortunately was not the last time he had missed large parts of a campaign due to injury. The 2008-09 season was far more successful for Campbell, with him racking up 37 appearances and scoring his first competitive goal for the club in a 3-0 away win over Arbroath. In January 2009, Campbell was struck by Kilmarnock's David Fernandez in an Ayrshire derby that was being shown on Sky Sports. Campbell was instrumental to the club's success and played in all of the club's play-off games as the Honest Men secured promotion back to the First Division. The following season, Ayr finished bottom and Campbell played in 28 matches, and Campbell was initially released at the end of the season, before being offered a trial during pre-season by then manager, Brian Reid, who then offered him a new deal, which he signed. Campbell was once again instrumental to the club's success throughout the 2010-11 campaign, playing 36 times and scoring another goal, this time in the Challenge Cup against Cowdenbeath, as well as featuring in Ayr's famous victory over Hibernian in the Scottish Cup and in all of the club's play-off games, which saw Ayr promoted back to the First Division. The 2011-12 season was more difficult for Campbell as he only featured 13 times, missing most of Ayr's impressive cup runs. Despite a disappointing season before, new manager Mark Roberts kept Campbell at the club on a pay-as-you-play basis and Campbell only went on to play in four matches. The next season saw Campbell's name return to the team sheets more regularly, featuring a total of 21 times. The 2014-15 season was a disastrous campaign for Ayr, however towards the end of the year, Ayr United intended on honouring Campbell with a testimonial.

== Personal life ==
Campbell was born in the Ayrshire village of Auchinleck, and is the younger brother of former Ayr United, Falkirk, Raith Rovers and Queen of the South defender Mark Campbell. Campbell is also a production manager with Taylor Wimpey and is currently married with two children. Campbell grew up supporting his local junior side, Auchinleck Talbot. Now he has his own business called Core Timber Systems which he is the co-founder of.
