= 2015–16 Ayr United F.C. season =

Ayr United
2015–16 season
- Manager: Ian McCall
- Stadium: Somerset Park
- League One: Second place (Promoted via play-offs)
- Challenge Cup: Second Round
- League Cup: Second Round
- Scottish Cup: Third Round
- Top goalscorer: League: Craig Moore (14); All: Jordan Preston (15)
- Highest home attendance: 7,468 vs. Rangers, Challenge Cup, 19 August 2015
- Lowest home attendance: 763 vs. Forfar Athletic, League One, 20 February 2016
- Average home league attendance: 1,296
Home colours	Away colours

The 2015–16 season was Ayr United's third season in League One and their 4th consecutive season in the third-tier of Scottish football. Ayr also competed in the League Cup, Scottish Cup and the Challenge Cup.

== Results and fixtures ==
=== Pre-season ===
Win Draw Loss

7 July 2015 Friendly	St Mirren	0 – 1	Ayr United	Ralston, Paisley
				Attendance: 0 (Behind closed doors)

11 July 2015 The Raydale Cup	Annan Athletic	1 – 3	Ayr United	Raydale Park, Gretna
15:30		Ayr Report

12 July 2015 The Raydale Cup	Gretna 2008	0 – 1	Ayr United	Raydale Park, Gretna
15:30		Report

15 July 2015 Friendly	Rangers	2 – 0	Ayr United	Rangers Training Centre, Auchenhowie
19:15	Templeton 24'; Holt (Trialist) 59'	Rangers Report		Attendance: 0 (Behind closed doors)

18 July 2015 Martyn Campbell Testimonial	Ayr United	0 – 1	(Northern Ireland) Coleraine	Somerset Park, Ayr
		Report

21 July 2015 Friendly	Ayr United	0 – 0	Hibernian	Somerset Park, Ayr
19:45

=== Scottish League One ===
8 August 2015 1	Albion Rovers	3 – 0	Ayr United	Cliftonhill, Coatbridge
15:00	Davidson 2'; Love 45', 69'	Report		Attendance: 781; Referee: Alan Newlands

15 August 2015 2	Ayr United	2 – 1	Brechin City	Somerset Park, Ayr
15:00	Forrest 21'; Trouten 73' (pen.)	Report	Thomson 68'; Smith (yellow card) 90+2' (red card)	Attendance: 1,074; Referee: Barry Cook

22 August 2015 3	Stranraer	1 – 2	Ayr United	Stair Park, Stranraer
15:00	Stirling 90'	Report	Moore 4'; Trouten 77'; Docherty (yellow card) 72' (red card)	Attendance: 882; Referee: Nick Walsh

29 August 2015 4	Ayr United	2 – 2	Forfar Athletic	Somerset Park, Ayr
15:00	Moore 45'; Forrest 58'	Report	Allan 26'; Travis 90+1'	Attendance: 1,243; Referee: Euan Anderson

1 September 2015 5	Ayr United	5 – 2	Stenhousemuir	Somerset Park, Ayr
19:45	Preston 3', 47'; Moore 26'; Barclay 35' (o.g.); Caldwell 86'	Report	Boyle 17' (o.g.); McCroary 88'	Attendance: 1,046; Referee: Don Robertson

12 September 2015 6	Dunfermline Athletic	0 – 2	Ayr United	East End Park, Dunfermline
15:00		Report	Forrest 23'; Preston 59'	Attendance: 3,596; Referee: Kevin Graham

19 September 2015 7	Airdrieonians	1 – 2	Ayr United	Excelsior Stadium, Airdrie
15:00	Watt 5'	Report	Moore 45'; Gilmour 66'	Attendance: 1,141; Referee: Steven Kirkland

26 September 2015 8	Ayr United	1 – 1	Peterhead	Somerset Park, Ayr
15:00	Devlin 55'	Report	Redman 87'	Attendance: 1,304; Referee: Stephen Finnie

3 October 2015 9	Ayr United	5 – 0	Cowdenbeath	Somerset Park, Ayr
15:00	Preston 1'; Forrest 19'; McLauchlan 48'; Gilmour 57'; Moore 72'	Report		Attendance: 1,171; Referee: Alan Newlands

17 October 2015 10	Forfar Athletic	2 – 2	Ayr United	Station Park, Forfar
15:00	Denholm 2'; Campbell 45'	BBC Sport report	Graham 54'; Devlin (red card) 68'; Caldwell 72'	Attendance: 745; Referee: Nick Walsh

24 October 2015 11	Stenhousemuir	0 – 1	Ayr United	Ochilview Park, Stenhousemuir
15:00	Robertson (red card) 89'	BBC Sport report	Caldwell 9'	Attendance: 767; Referee: Greg Aitken

31 October 2015 12	Ayr United	3 – 1	Stranraer	Somerset Park, Ayr
15:00	Crawford 15'; Adams 39'; Preston 83'	Report	Robertson 29'	Attendance: 1,415; Referee: Gavin Duncan

7 November 2015 13	Brechin City	1 – 1	Ayr United	Glebe Park, Brechin
15:00	Layne 47'	Report	Adams 43'	Attendance: 541; Referee: Barry Cook

14 November 2015 14	Ayr United	1 – 0	Albion Rovers	Somerset Park, Ayr
15:00	Trouten 38'	Report		Attendance: 1,389; Referee: George Salmond

21 November 2015 15	Ayr United	3 – 0	Airdrieonians	Somerset Park, Ayr
15:00		Report		Attendance: 1,403; Referee: Stephen Finnie

12 December 2015 16	Ayr United	1 – 2	Dunfermline Athletic	Somerset Park, Ayr
15:00		Report		Attendance: 2,076; Referee: Andrew Dallas

19 December 2015 17	Peterhead	3 – 0	Ayr United	Balmoor Stadium, Peterhead
15:00		Report		Attendance: 612; Referee: Alan Newlands

26 December 2015 18	Ayr United	2 – 1	Brechin City	Somerset Park, Ayr
15:00		Report		Attendance: 1,485; Referee: Nick Walsh

29 December 2015 19	Cowdenbeath	4 – 2	Ayr United	Central Park, Cowdenbeath
15:00		Report		Attendance: 640; Referee: George Salmond

2 January 2016 20	Stranraer	1 – 0	Ayr United	Stair Park, Stranraer
15:00		Report		Attendance: 1,178; Referee: Colin Steven

23 January 2016 21	Albion Rovers	1 – 3	Ayr United	Cliftonhill, Coatbridge
15:00		Report		Attendance: 427; Referee: David Lowe

6 February 2016 22	Ayr United	1 – 2	Peterhead	Somerset Park, Ayr
15:00		Report		Attendance: 1,155; Referee: Alan Muir

13 February 2016 23	Dunfermline	3 – 2	Ayr United	East End Park, Dunfermline
15:00		Report		Attendance: 3,319; Referee: Nick Walsh

20 February 2016 24	Ayr United	2 – 1	Forfar	Somerset Park, Ayr
15:00		Report		Attendance: 763; Referee: Gavin Duncan

27 February 2016 25	Airdrieonians	0 – 1	Ayr United	Excelsior Stadium, Airdrie
15:00		Report		Attendance: 1,000; Referee: Mike Roncone

1 March 2016 26	Ayr United	4 – 1	Cowdenbeath	Somerset Park, Ayr
		Report		Attendance: 856; Referee: Gavin Ross

5 March 2016 27	Brechin	1 – 0	Ayr United	Glebe Park, Brechin
15:00		Report		Attendance: 491; Referee: David Munro

8 March 2016 28	Ayr United	4 – 1	Stenhousmuir	Somerset Park, Ayr
		Report		Attendance: 889; Referee: Alan Newlands

12 March 2016 29	Ayr United	0 – 2	Dunfermline	Somerset Park, Ayr
		Report		Attendance: 2,190; Referee: Don Robertson

19 March 2016 30	Forfar	3 – 1	Ayr United	Station Park, Forfar
		Report		Attendance: 614; Referee: Gavin Ross

26 March 2016 31	Ayr United	2 – 1	Stranraer	Somerset Park, Ayr
		Report		Attendance: 1,244; Referee: Colin Steven

2 April 2016 32	Cowdenbeath	1 – 0	Ayr United	Central Park, Cowdenbeath
		Report		Attendance: 429; Referee: David Munro

9 April 2016 33	Ayr United	0 – 1	Albion	Somerset Park, Ayr
		Report		Attendance: 1,044; Referee: Gavin Duncan

16 April 2016 34	Stenhousemuir	0 – 4	Ayr United	Ochilview Park, Stenhousemuir
15:00		Report		Attendance: 652; Referee: Barry Cook

23 April 2016 35	Peterhead	0 – 4	Ayr United	Balmoor Stadium, Peterhead
15:00	McAllister (red card)	Report	Moore 24', 81'; McCrorie 45'; Preston 56'	Attendance: 617; Referee: Euan Anderson

30 April 2016 36	Ayr United	0 – 3	Airdrieonians	Somerset Park, Ayr
15:00		Report		Attendance: 1,594; Referee: Greg Aitken

=== Scottish Championship play-offs ===
3 May 2016	Peterhead	1 – 4	Ayr United	Balmoor, Peterhead
20:00	McIntosh 35'	BBC Report	Donald 18'; Preston 41', 59'; Crawford 74'	Attendance: 807; Referee: Stephen Finnie

7 May 2016	Ayr United	2 – 1 (6 – 2 agg.)	Peterhead	Somerset Park, Ayr
15:00	Crawford 26'; Devlin 57'	BBC Report	Donald 31' (o.g.)	Attendance: 1,848; Referee: Crawford Allan

11 May 2016	Stranraer	1 – 1	Ayr United	Stair Park, Stranraer
19:45	McGuigan 54'	BBC Report	Docherty 90+5'	Attendance: 1,652; Referee: Bobby Madden

15 May 2016	Ayr United	0 – 0 (a.e.t.) (1 – 1 agg.) (3–1 p)	Stranraer	Somerset Park, Ayr
14:45		BBC Report		Attendance: 4,581; Referee: Andrew Dallas
	Penalties
	Preston (penalty scored); Trouten (penalty scored); Docherty (penalty missed); Graham (penalty scored)		Cairney (penalty missed); Longworth (penalty missed); Barron (penalty missed); Gibson (penalty scored)

=== Scottish Challenge Cup ===
25 July 2015 First Round	Ayr United	3 – 1	Albion Rovers	Somerset Park, Ayr
		Report		Attendance: 1,003; Referee: Gavin Ross

19 August 2015 Second Round	Ayr United	0 – 2	Rangers	Somerset Park, Ayr
19:45		BBC Report; Rangers Report; SPFL Report		Attendance: 7,468; Referee: Stephen Finnie

=== Scottish League Cup ===
1 August 2015 Round 1	Ayr United	2 – 0	Brechin City	Somerset Park, Ayr
		Report		Attendance: 976; Referee: Euan Anderson

25 August 2015 Round 2	Ross County	2 – 0	Ayr United	Victoria Park, Dingwall
		Report		Attendance: 1,743; Referee: Craig Charleston

=== Scottish Cup ===
28 November 2015 Round 3	Ayr United	0 – 1	Dunfermline Athletic	Somerset Park, Ayr
		Report	Geggan 22'	Attendance: 1,576; Referee: Kevin Clancy

== Player statistics ==
=== Squad, appearance and goals ===
As of 15 May 2016

No.	Nat	Player	Total		League		Scottish Cup		League Cup		Other	
No.	Nat	Player	Apps	Goals	Apps	Goals	Apps	Goals	Apps	Goals	Apps	Goals
Goalkeepers
	(Scotland)	Greg Fleming	45	0	36	0	1	0	2	0	6	0
	(Scotland)	Shaun Newman	0	0	0	0	0	0	0	0	0	0
Defenders
	(Scotland)	Patrick Boyle	37	1	27 (1)	0	1	0	2	1	6	0
	(Scotland)	Martyn Campbell	2	0	1	0	0	0	1	0	0	0
	(Scotland)	Nicky Devlin	42	3	33 (1)	1	0	0	2	0	6	2
	(Scotland)	Gerry McLauchlan	29	3	21 (3)	2	1	0	2	1	2	0
	(Scotland)	Craig McCracken	3	0	1	0	0	0	1 (1)	0	0 (1)	0
	(Scotland)	Ross McCrorie	15	0	11	2	0	0	0	0	4	0
	(Scotland)	Andy Graham	28	2	22 (3)	2	1	0	0	0	1 (1)	0
	(Scotland)	Adam Hodge	0	0	0	0	0	0	0	0	0	0
	(Scotland)	Andrew Muir	4	0	1 (2)	0	1	0	0	0	0	0
Midfielders
	(Republic of Ireland)	Peter Murphy	36	0	29 (1)	0	0	0	0	0	6	0
	(Scotland)	Jamie Adams	26	2	17 (3)	2	1	0	1	0	4	0
	(Scotland)	Robbie Crawford	35	3	15 (12)	1	0	0 (1)	1	0	5 (1)	2
	(Scotland)	Ross Docherty	35	1	25 (1)	0	1	0	2	0	6	1
	(Scotland)	Michael Donald	40	3	16 (15)	2	1	0	2	0	5 (1)	1
	(Scotland)	Alan Forrest	39	5	22 (12)	5	1	0	0 (2)	0	0 (2)	0
	(Scotland)	Brian Gilmour	31	2	19 (4)	2	0 (1)	0	2	0	3 (3)	0
	(Scotland)	Alan Trouten	39	7	25 (6)	6	1	0	2	0	2 (3)	1
	(Scotland)	Michael Wardrope	10	1	4 (6)	1	0	0	0	0	0	0
Forwards
	(Scotland)	Ross Caldwell	22	5	6 (11)	4	0 (1)	0	2	0	2	1
	(Scotland)	Sean McKenzie	5	0	0 (5)	0	0	0	0	0	0	0
	(Scotland)	Craig Moore	30	14	23 (2)	14	0	0	0 (1)	0	4	0
	(Scotland)	Jordan Preston	40	15	28 (6)	13	1	0	0 (1)	0	4	2
	(Scotland)	Ryan Nisbet	4	0	0 (1)	0	0	0	0 (1)	0	0 (2)	0
	(Scotland)	Ryan Stevenson	22	6	16 (2)	6	0	0	0 (1)	0	1 (2)	0

== Club statistics ==
=== Final League table ===
Pos	Team	Pld	W	D	L	GF	GA	GD	Pts	Promotion, qualification or relegation
1	Dunfermline Athletic (C, P)	36	24	7	5	83	30	+53	79	Promotion to Scottish Championship
2	Ayr United (O, P)	36	19	4	13	65	47	+18	61	Qualification to Championship play-offs
3	Peterhead	36	16	11	9	72	47	+25	59	Qualification to Championship play-offs
4	Stranraer	36	15	6	15	43	49	−6	51	Qualification to Championship play-offs
5	Airdrieonians	36	14	7	15	48	50	−2	49	

Source: BBC Sport
Rules for classification: 1) Points; 2) Goal difference; 3) Number of goals scored
(C) Champions; (O) Play-off winners; (P) Promoted

==== Results by round ====
Round	1	2	3	4	5	6	7	8	9	10	11	12	13	14	15	16	17	18	19	20	21	22	23	24	25	26	27	28	29	30	31	32	33	34	35	36
Ground	A	H	A	H	H	A	A	H	H	A	A	H	A	H	H	H	A	H	A	A	A	H	A	H	A	H	A	H	H	A	H	A	H	A	A	H
Result	L	W	W	D	W	W	W	D	W	D	W	W	D	W	W	L	L	W	L	L	W	L	L	W	W	W	L	W	L	L	W	L	L	W	W	L
Position	9	6	4	5	3	2	1	1	1	2	2	1	1	1	1	2	2	2	2	2	2	3	3	3	3	3	3	3	3	3	3	3	3	3	2	2

Updated to match(es) played on May 2016. Source: BBC Sport
A = Away; H = Home; W = Win; D = Draw; L = Loss

Ayr United play each other team in the Scottish League One four times, twice in the first half of the season (home and away) and twice in the second half of the season (home and away), making a total of 36 games.

Win Draw Loss

First half of the season
Opposition	Home score	Away score
Airdrieonians	3 – 0	1 – 2
Albion Rovers	1 – 0	3 – 0
Brechin City	2 – 1	1 – 1
Cowdenbeath	5 – 0	4 – 2
Dunfermline Athletic	1 – 2	0 – 2
Forfar Athletic	2 – 2	2 – 2
Peterhead	1 – 1	3 – 0
Stenhousemuir	5 – 2	0 – 1
Stranraer	3 – 1	1 – 2

Last updated: 30 April 2016.
Source: Competitive matches

Second half of season
Opposition	Home score	Away score
Airdrieonians	0 – 3	0 – 1
Albion Rovers	0 – 1	1 – 3
Brechin City	2 – 1	1 – 0
Cowdenbeath	4 – 1	1 – 0
Dunfermline Athletic	0 – 2	3 – 2
Forfar Athletic	2 – 1	3 – 1
Peterhead	1 – 2	0 – 4
Stenhousemuir	4 – 1	0 – 4
Stranraer	2 – 1	1 – 0

Last updated: 30 April 2016.
Source: Competitive matches

=== Home attendances ===
Win Draw Loss

Comp	Date	Score	Opponent	Attendance	Ref.
Challenge Cup	25 July 2015	3 – 1	Albion Rovers	1,003	
League Cup	1 August 2015	2 – 0	Brechin City	976	
League One	15 August 2015	2 – 1	Brechin City	1,074	
Challenge Cup	19 August 2015	0 – 2	Rangers	7,468	
League One	29 August 2015	2 – 2	Forfar Athletic	1,243	
League One	1 September 2015	5 – 2	Stenhousemuir	1,046	
League One	26 September 2015	1 – 1	Peterhead	1,304	
League One	3 October 2015	5 – 0	Cowdenbeath	1,171	
League One	31 October 2015	3 – 1	Stranraer	1,415	
League One	14 November 2015	1 – 0	Albion Rovers	1,389	
League One	21 November 2015	3 – 0	Airdrieonians	1,403	
Scottish Cup	28 November 2015	0 – 1	Dunfermline	1,576	
League One	12 December 2015	1 – 2	Dunfermline	2,076	
League One	26 December 2015	2 – 1	Brechin City	1,485	
League One	6 February 2016	1 – 2	Peterhead	1,155	
League One	20 February 2016	2 – 1	Forfar Athletic	763	
League One	1 March 2016	4 – 1	Cowdenbeath	856	
League One	8 March 2016	4 – 1	Stenhousemuir	889	
League One	12 March 2016	0 – 2	Dunfermline Athletic	2,190	
League One	26 March 2016	2 – 1	Stranraer	1,244	
League One	9 April 2016	0 – 1	Albion Rovers	1,044	
League One	30 April 2016	0 – 3	Airdrieonians	1,594	
Play-off	7 May 2016	2 – 1	Peterhead	1,848	
Play-off	15 May 2016	0 – 0 (3-1p)	Stranraer	4,581	
			Total attendance:	40,793	
			Average total attendance:	1,670	
			Total league attendance:	24,317	
			Average league attendance:	1,296	

Last updated: 15 May 2016
Source: Match reports in Results

== Transfers ==
=== Players in ===
Player	From	Fee
(Scotland) Patrick Boyle	(Scotland) Airdrieonians	Free
(Scotland) Alan Trouten	(Scotland) Brechin City	Free
(Scotland) Gerry McLauchlan	(Scotland) Brechin City	Free
(Scotland) Greg Fleming	(Scotland) Stenhousemuir	Free
(Scotland) Ross Docherty	(Scotland) Airdrieonians	Free
(Scotland) Jamie Adams	(Scotland) Wigtown & Bladnoch	Free
(Scotland) Ross Caldwell	(Scotland) Greenock Morton	Free
(Scotland) Craig Moore	(Scotland) Motherwell	Loan
(Scotland) Jordan Preston	(England) Blackburn Rovers	Loan
(Scotland) Andy Graham	(Scotland) Dumbarton	Free
(Scotland) Ryan Stevenson	(Scotland) Partick Thistle	Free
(Scotland) Ross McCrorie	(Scotland) Rangers	Loan
(Scotland) Adam Hodge	(Scotland) Kilmarnock	Free

=== Players out ===
Player	To	Fee
(Scotland) David Hutton	(Scotland) Dunfermline Athletic	Free
(Scotland) Craig Beattie	(Scotland) Stirling Albion	Free
(Scotland) David Robertson	(Scotland) Selkirk	Free
(Scotland) Jon-Paul McGovern	(Scotland) Stirling Albion	Free
(Scotland) Dale Shirkie	(Scotland) Troon	Free
