= Graham Girvan =

Scottish footballer

Personal information
- Date of birth: 24 April 1990 (age 36)
- Place of birth: Glasgow, Scotland
- Position: Defender

Senior career*
Years	Team	Apps	(Gls)
2007–2010	Ross County	6	(0)
2010–2011	Clyde	14	(0)
2011–2012	Arbroath	5	(0)
- Petershill
Total		25	(0)
- * Club domestic league appearances and goals

Graham Girvan (born 24 April 1990) is a Scottish former football defender.

== Career ==
Girvan began his career with Ross County, and had a trial with Bolton Wanderers in March 2007. Girvan made his senior debut in a Scottish Second Division match against Alloa Athletic in April 2008, after County had won promotion to the Scottish First Division. He captained the under-19 side during his time at County.

Girvan went on to make only 7 appearances over the next two seasons with Ross County, and left the club in May 2010, signing for Clyde. He only stayed with Clyde for a year, being released at the end of the season.
