= David Crawford (footballer, born 1985) =

Scottish footballer

Personal information
- Date of birth: 30 June 1985 (age 41)
- Place of birth: Glasgow, Scotland
- Height: 6 ft 2 in (1.88 m)
- Position: Goalkeeper

Senior career*
Years	Team	Apps	(Gls)
2003–2007	Queen's Park	94	(0)
2007–2008	Dumbarton	26	(0)
2008–2009	Queen's Park	23	(0)
2009–2010	Alloa Athletic	36	(0)
2010–2011	Ayr United	18	(0)
2011–2012	Clyde	11	(0)
2012	Stirling Albion	0	(0)
2012–2013	Montrose	9	(0)
2013–2014	Stirling Albion	43	(0)
2014–2015	Arbroath	10	(1)
2015–2016	Alloa Athletic	10	(0)
2016	Partick Thistle	0	(0)
2016–2017	Stenhousemuir	10	(0)
2019–2020	Queen's Park	0	(0)

Managerial career
- 2017–2018: Clyde (GK coach)
- * Club domestic league appearances and goals

David Crawford (born 30 June 1985) is a Scottish football coach and a former goalkeeper.

== Career ==
Crawford began his career with Queen's Park. He moved to Dumbarton for the 2007–08 season, but returned to Queen's Park at the end of the season. Across two spells with The Spiders Crawford made 132 appearances in all competitions.

Following Queen's Park's relegation to the Third Division, Crawford signed for Alloa Athletic on 4 June 2009. On 4 June 2010, after Alloa had missed out on promotion, Crawford signed for fellow Second Division club Ayr United. During his time at Ayr, in a match against Forfar Athletic, he saved two of four penalties his team conceded in a 4–1 defeat.

On 13 August 2011, Crawford played for Albion Rovers as a trialist against Forfar Athletic, as both the club's registered goalkeepers were unavailable. In December 2011, he signed for Clyde.

Crawford signed for Stirling Albion during the 2012 summer transfer window. This was only a short-term deal to cover for their three injured goalkeepers however, and with their return to fitness he left the club in August 2012, after playing just one cup match against Arbroath. He then moved to Montrose. However, he returned to Stirling Albion in January 2013, initially until the end of the 2012-13 season, but then extended his stay until May 2014.

Crawford signed for Arbroath in July 2014. On 25 October 2014, he scored as Arbroath won 5–1 against Montrose, his long free-kick from his own half beating Montrose goalkeeper Lucas Birnstingl. In June 2015, Crawford returned for a second spell with Scottish Championship side Alloa Athletic. However, after Alloa's relegation from the Scottish Championship, Crawford was released by the club.

=== Partick Thistle Spell ===
On 15 July 2016, Crawford signed a short-term contract with Scottish Premiership side Partick Thistle, to provide cover for injured goalkeepers Tomáš Černý and Ryan Scully after having impressed as a trialist in a friendly game against Morton. Crawford was assigned the number 35 squad number. He made his debut for the club in the same evening that he signed for them, playing and keeping a clean sheet away to Airdrionians in the Scottish League Cup. Crawford played 3 group stage games in the Scottish League Cup as Thistle won all 4 games and topped their group.

=== Later career ===
After a trial period with Elgin City, Crawford signed for Stenhousemuir in October 2016 until the end of the 2016–17 season.
