= Chris Aitken =

Scottish footballer

Personal information
- Date of birth: 31 March 1979 (age 47)
- Place of birth: Glasgow, Scotland
- Position: Midfielder

Team information
- Current team: Stranraer (manager)

Youth career
- –1998: Erskine B.C.
- 1998–2000: Greenock Morton

Senior career*
| Years | Team | Apps | (Gls) |
| 2000 | Greenock Morton | 2 | (0) |
| 2000–2001 | Clyde | 23 | (2) |
| 2001–2003 | Greenock Morton | 19 | (1) |
| 2003–2005 | Hamilton Academical | 54 | (8) |
| 2005–2008 | Stirling Albion | 101 | (37) |
| 2008–2010 | Ayr United | 42 | (6) |
| 2010–2011 | Stirling Albion | 31 | (9) |
| 2011–2016 | Stranraer | 117 | (24) |
| Total | | 389 | (87) |

Managerial career
- 2017: Stranraer (interim)
- 2021–2023: East Kilbride
- 2023-2024: Kilwinning Rangers
- 2024–: Stranraer
- * Club domestic league appearances and goals

Christopher Aitken (born 31 March 1979) is a Scottish retired footballer who manages Scottish League Two club Stranraer.

He moved into management at East Kilbride after his elder brother Stephen resigned from his position on 10 August 2021.

Stephen is also a former footballer.

== Playing career ==
=== Morton, Clyde & Morton again ===
Aitken started his professional career at Greenock Morton, making his debut against Inverness Caledonian Thistle on 1 April 2000. He played only two games for the club before being signed by Clyde on 14 June 2000.

He made his first team debut for Clyde on 5 August 2000 against Falkirk and went on to make a further 23 appearances for Clyde. Aitken scored his first goal of his professional career against Airdrie on 22 November 2000. Aitken stayed with Clyde for just over a season before returning to play for Greenock Morton on 10 November 2001.

He made his second debut for Morton on 10 November 2001 against Forfar Athletic. Aitken remained with Greenock Morton for two seasons making 19 appearances for the club, before signing for Hamilton Academical in June 2003.

=== Hamilton ===
Aitken made his debut for Hamilton and scored his first goal on 2 August 2003 against St Johnstone in the Scottish League Challenge Cup. He went on to make over 50 league appearances, scoring 8 goals for the club during his time there, before he signed for Stirling Albion on 31 January 2005.

=== Stirling ===
Aitken made his debut for Stirling Albion against Dumbarton on 5 February 2005. Aitken scored his first goal for Stirling Albion against Brechin City on 26 February 2005. Since signing in 2005, Aitken went on to make over 90 league appearances, scoring over 30 goals for the Binos. Aitken was awarded the Players Player of the Year award for the 2006–07 season. He was made captain of the Stirlingshire side and at the end of the 2007–08 season, Aitken won the Stirling Albion supporters club player of the year award and the Stirling Albion supporters Trust award. Aitken was the leading goal scorer for Stirling Albion in the 2007–08 season. In May 2008, after Stirling Albion were relegated to the Scottish Second Division, Aitken agreed a two-year deal with Second Division rivals Ayr United, stating that Ayr's ambition is what drew him to Somerset Park.

=== Ayr ===
In May 2008, Aitken became Ayr's eighth signing since the end of the 2007–08 season. Chris is widely recognised as one of the best penalty kick taker's in Scottish football, having only missed two out of 40 attempts. He played a major part in Ayr's playoff success in the 2008–09 season, scoring three goals against Brechin and captaining the side all the way to the First division. On 13 January 2010, Chris, by mutual agreement, had his contract ended, and signed for former club Stirling Albion.

=== Stirling (second spell) ===
Aitken made his second début for the Beanos in a 3–3 draw with East Fife on 23 January 2010. Three goals in his first two games back in an Albion shirt showed that Chris was just as potent a goal threat as ever. It was announced he was to be released from 15 May 2011.

=== Stranraer ===
After his release he joined Stranraer for the 2011–12 season, signing a deal in May 2011. Aitken spent 5 seasons with Stranraer before retiring at the end of the 2015–16 season.

== Coaching career ==
After being involved with first-team coaching with Stranraer during the 2015–16 season, Aitken was appointed assistant manager to Brian Reid shortly after announcing his retirement. After Reid left the club by mutual consent in January 2017, Aitken was made interim manager until Reid's successor could be appointed. Not long after this, former Blues assistant Stephen Farrell was named the new manager of Stranraer, taking up the position following on 23 January 2017. Aitken remained as interim manager for the Scottish Cup match against Aberdeen, which the side lost 4–0, before returning to his previous position as assistant manager. On 10 August 2021, became caretaker manager at East Kilbride.

In February 2023, Aitken took over as manager of West of Scotland Football League side Kilwinning Rangers; bringing in Ian Durrant and Owen Archdeacon to form his coaching team.

In September 2024, Aitken returned to Stranraer to become manager.

== Managerial statistics ==
As of match played 14 November 2026

Managerial record by team and tenure
| Team | From | To | Record | | | | | Ref |
| Team | From | To | P | W | D | L | Win % | Ref |
|---|---|---|---|---|---|---|---|---|
| Stranraer (interim) | 17 January 2017 | 23 January 2017 | 1 | 0 | 0 | 1 | 0.0 | |
| Stranraer | 30 September 2024 | present | 104 | 42 | 25 | 37 | 40.4 | |
| Career Total | | | 105 | 42 | 25 | 38 | 40.00 | — |
