= Stephen Grindlay =

Scottish footballer

Personal information
- Full name: Stephen Grindlay
- Date of birth: 13 March 1982 (age 44)
- Place of birth: Alexandria, Scotland
- Position: Goalkeeper

Team information
- Current team: St Cadoc's

Youth career
- 1998–2000: Celtic

Senior career*
Years	Team	Apps	(Gls)
2000–2001	Newcastle United	0	(0)
2001	Grimsby Town	0	(0)
2001–2007	Dumbarton	174	(0)
2007–2008	Queen of the South	2	(0)
2008–2010	Ayr United	41	(0)
2010–2015	Dumbarton	93	(0)
2015–2020	Beith Juniors	182	(0)
2020–	St Cadoc's YC		
- * Club domestic league appearances and goals as of 16/6/2020

Stephen Grindlay (born 13 March 1982 in Alexandria, West Dunbartonshire) is a Scottish professional footballer who plays as a goalkeeper for St Cadoc's.

== Club career ==
=== Early career ===
Grindlay began his career as a youth player for Celtic before being picked up by Newcastle United. He was primarily in the youth system, however he did make one appearance in a friendly match with the first team against Berwick Rangers when he was 19. He left and had a spell with Grimsby Town. This was brief and soon returned home, with his family at Dumbarton.

=== Dumbarton ===
Grindlay was shipped off on loan to Dumbarton Academy FPs during his first season to give him some regular football. He helped guide them to a domestic cup final at Hampden Park in Glasgow, losing 2–1. He returned and found himself immediately in the 1st team. He became one of Dumbarton's most experienced and highest paid players at such a young age, making nearly 200 appearances and setting records along the way. In 2004, he won the Dick Jackson Memorial Shield, an award given to players by supporters for being the best young player at the club. On 7 April 2007 he kept his 15th clean sheet of the season, breaking a record set back during the 1991–92 season.

=== Queen of the South ===
After leaving Dumbarton, Grindlay signed for First Division side Queen of the South on 9 July 2007. He made four appearances for the club.

=== Ayr United ===
Grindlay was snapped up by Ayr United boss Brian Reid after his release from Queen of the South. Grindlay played in every game in the 2008–09 Season as Ayr went up via the Play-Offs. On 10 January 2009 he saved an Allan Russell penalty in a 2-2 Scottish Cup draw with Kilmarnock.

=== Dumbarton ===
Grindlay opted to take up a second spell with the Sons for the 2010–11 season, he has signed for another season at 'The Rock' in May 2011. During the 2011–12 season he was in fine form as he helped the Sons win promotion through the play-offs to make the First Division for the first time in 16 years. After re-signing with the club for the 2014–15 season, his 10th season with Dumbarton and was entitled to a Testimonial match. He had the following to say about his testimonial:

"We will need to look to get a testimonial committee together and fingers crossed we can get a game and a few events arranged... It will be a good chance to get the players and the fans together for a day that everyone can enjoy."

He left the club on the week of the testimonial at the end of his contract.

== Honours ==
Ayr United

- Scottish First Division play-offs : 2008–09

Dumbarton

- Scottish First Division play-offs : 2011–12

Beith Juniors

- Scottish Junior Cup : 2015–16
