= Stephen Reynolds (footballer) =

Scottish footballer

Personal information
- Date of birth: 11 June 1992 (age 34)
- Place of birth: Rothesay, Scotland
- Position: Striker

Youth career
- Gleniffer Thistle

Senior career*
Years	Team	Apps	(Gls)
2008–2012	St Johnstone	10	(0)
2009	→ Ayr United (loan)	4	(1)
2010	→ Ayr United (loan)	7	(0)
2011	→ Raith Rovers (loan)	11	(1)

International career
2010	Scotland U19	2	(1)
- * Club domestic league appearances and goals as of 5 January 2012

Stephen Reynolds (born 11 June 1992) is a Scottish footballer who played as a striker for St Johnstone.

== Career ==
Reynolds was signed by St Johnstone in 2008 from youth team Gleniffer Thistle. In his first season with the club, he scored over 40 goals in the under-19 team. He made his senior debut for St Johnstone on 11 May 2009, in the 4–0 victory away at Airdrie United.

In November 2009, Reynolds was signed on a one-month emergency loan by Ayr United. He joined Ayr for a second loan spell, this time for six months, at the start of the 2010–11 season.

On 7 July 2011, Reynolds moved on loan to Scottish First Division club Raith Rovers. On 5 January 2012, he returned to St Johnstone at the end of his loan. He left St Johnstone at the end of the 2011–12 season.
