= William Easton (footballer) =

Scottish footballer

Personal information
- Full name: William Easton
- Date of birth: 17 July 1986 (age 40)
- Place of birth: Rutherglen, Scotland
- Position: Left winger

Youth career
- Dundee United

Senior career*
Years	Team	Apps	(Gls)
2003–2007	Dundee United	8	(0)
2007	→ Stirling Albion (loan)	7	(1)
2008–2011	Ayr United	87	(7)
2011–2013	Kirkintilloch Rob Roy		
2013–2014	Pollok		
2014–2015	Cambuslang Rangers		
2015–?	Kilsyth Rangers		
- * Club domestic league appearances and goals

William Easton (born 17 July 1986) is a Scottish former footballer who played as a left winger. He began his career in the Scottish Premier League for Dundee United, making his debut in 2006. He also played for Stirling Albion on loan before signing for Ayr United in 2008. After entering junior football in 2011, Easton had spells with Kirkintilloch Rob Roy, Pollok, Cambuslang Rangers and Kilsyth Rangers.

== Career ==
Easton was a product of Dundee United's youth system and made his first-team debut for United in May 2006, as a substitute in the 1–1 draw against Motherwell on the final day of the 2005–06 SPL season. The following season, Easton made a further seven appearances, with one start in May 2007. Earlier, in January 2007, Easton began training with Raith Rovers in preparation for a loan move, although no move materialised.

On 28 August 2007, Easton moved on loan to Stirling Albion, making his debut in the 2–0 defeat by Heart of Midlothian in the League Cup match that same day. He returned to Dundee United at the end of 2007 and was released from his contract a few days later. On 6 January 2008, Easton joined Ayr United.

Easton was released by Ayr in May 2011 and joined Junior side Kirkintilloch Rob Roy later that summer. Easton Joined Pollok at the start of season 2013–14 before moving to Cambuslang Rangers in 2014 and then Kilsyth Rangers in 2015.

== Career statistics ==
Club	Season	League		Cup		Lg Cup		Other		Total	
Club	Season	Apps	Goals	Apps	Goals	Apps	Goals	Apps	Goals	Apps	Goals
Dundee United	2005–06	1	0	0	0	0	0	0	0	1	0
Dundee United	2006–07	7	0	0	0	0	0	0	0	7	0
Dundee United	Total	8	0	0	0	0	0	0	0	8	0
Stirling Albion (loan)	2007–08	7	1	1	0	1	0	0	0	9	1
Stirling Albion (loan)	Total	7	1	1	0	1	0	0	0	9	1
Ayr United	2007–08	10	1	0	0	0	0	0	0	10	1
Ayr United	2008–09	20	3	2	0	2	0	1	0	25	3
Ayr United	Total	30	4	2	0	2	0	1	0	35	4
Career total		45	5	3	0	3	0	1	0	52	5
