= Neil McGowan =

Scottish footballer and coach

- Neil McGowan, Troon F.C. Coach (October 2015)

Personal information
- Full name: Neil William McGowan
- Date of birth: 15 April 1977 (age 49)
- Place of birth: Glasgow, Scotland
- Position: Defender

Team information
- Current team: Troon

Senior career*
Years	Team	Apps	(Gls)
1995–1996	Stranraer	4	(0)
1996–1999	Albion Rovers	64	(0)
1999–2001	Oxford United	31	(0)
2001	Stranraer	7	(0)
2001–2002	Clydebank	32	(3)
2002	KA Akureyri	11	(2)
2002–2007	Airdrie United	151	(1)
2007–2008	Queen of the South	3	(0)
2007–2008	→ Stranraer (loan)	8	(0)
2008–2010	Ayr United	55	(1)
2010–2011	Clyde	45	(1)
2011–2013	Irvine Meadow	0	(0)
2013–2016	Troon	0	(0)
2016–2017	Irvine Meadow	0	(8)
2017–	Troon	-	(-)
- * Club domestic league appearances and goals as of 19:11, 7 May 2011 (UTC)

Neil William McGowan (born 15 April 1977 in Glasgow) is a Scottish professional footballer who is currently player/first-team coach in the Scottish Juniors with Troon.

== Playing career ==
McGowan was signed by Queen of the South manager Gordon Chisholm in 2007 and was primarily a centre back, who could also play full back. When signing for the Doonhamers, McGowan had already played for six other clubs that included Stranraer, Albion Rovers, Oxford United, Clydebank, KA Akureyri (Iceland) and Airdrie United.

McGowan then signed for Ayr United on 25 January 2008.

McGowan then signed for Clyde F.C., who his father (also named Neil) had played for in the late Sixties and early Seventies, in the January 2010 transfer window and he stayed at the Bully Wer until May 2011, after making 48 appearances in all competitions.

After his release from the Cumbernauld club, McGowan joined his brother Chris at Irvine Meadow.

McGowan then signed for Troon in the summer of 2013 and was part of the West of Scotland Super League First Division winning team in season 2013–14. McGowan was then appointed player-coach in May 2015.

== Coaching career ==
McGowan started his coaching career when he joined Ayr United and worked as the club's under 19s coach at Somerset Park and was then appointed player-coach of Troon in May 2015 under Jimmy Kirkwood.
