= Aaron Connolly (Scottish footballer) =

Scottish footballer

Personal information
- Date of birth: 16 July 1991 (age 35)
- Place of birth: Glasgow, Scotland
- Position: Forward

Team information
- Current team: East Kilbride Thistle (player-manager) (caretaker)

Youth career
- Ayr United

Senior career*
Years	Team	Apps	(Gls)
2010–2011	Ayr United	6	(0)
2010	→ Annan Athletic (loan)	2	(0)
2011	→ Girvan (loan)		
2011–2012	Cumnock Juniors		
2012	East Kilbride Thistle		
2012–2013	Hurlford United		
2013–2015	Glenafton Athletic		
2015	BSC Glasgow		
2015–2016	East Kilbride		
2016	→ East Kilbride Thistle (loan)		
2017–2019	Irvine Meadow		
2019-2020	Fauldhouse United		
2022-	East Kilbride Thistle		

Managerial career
- 2022-: East Kilbride Thistle (caretaker)
- * Club domestic league appearances and goals as of 21:29, 12 October 2014 (UTC)

Aaron Connolly (born 16 July 1991) is a Scottish footballer who plays as a striker and caretaker manager for East Kilbride Thistle. He has previously played in the Scottish Championship for Ayr United.

== Career ==
Connolly came through the pro youth set-up at Ayr United and made his Scottish Football League Division One debut against Ross County in January 2010. He had a brief loan spell at Annan Athletic in late 2010 before joining Junior side Girvan for the rest of the season.

Connolly went on to play for Cumnock Juniors, East Kilbride Thistle and Hurlford United. He joined Glenafton Athletic of the Scottish Junior Football Association, West Region, in August 2013.

In July 2015 Connolly joined Lowland League side BSC Glasgow, signing a two-year contract. He left the club in December 2015, following the departure of manager Craig Young, and joined East Kilbride.

In March 2016, Connolly joined East Kilbride Thistle on loan until the end of the 2015–16 season. He joined Irvine Meadow in July 2017.

He spent the 2019-20 season with Fauldhouse United.

Connolly was appointed caretaker manager in September 2022 following the departure of Garry O'Hanlon.
