= William McLachlan (footballer) =

Scottish footballer

Personal information
- Full name: William McLachlan
- Date of birth: 19 March 1989 (age 37)
- Place of birth: Rutherglen, Scotland
- Positions: Defender; midfielder

Team information
- Current team: Irvine Meadow

Senior career*
Years	Team	Apps	(Gls)
2007–2009	Rangers	0	(0)
2008–2009	→ Airdrie United (loan)	18	(0)
2009–2010	Clyde	35	(2)
2010–2011	Lanark United		
2011–2013	Kirkintilloch Rob Roy		
2013	Bulleen Lions		
2013–2014	Melbourne Knights FC		
2014–	Irvine Meadow		
- * Club domestic league appearances and goals as of 19:30, 30 July 2014 (UTC)

William McLachlan (born 19 March 1989) is a Scottish footballer who plays for Irvine Meadow in the Scottish Junior Football Association, West Region. He has previously played in the Scottish Football League First Division for Airdrie United and for Australian club Melbourne Knights in the Victorian Premier League.

== Career ==
McLachlan began his career with Rangers and appeared for the Scotland U-16 team in a Victory Shield match against Northern Ireland in October 2004. In December 2008, he joined Airdrie United on loan. He made his debut against St Johnstone on 20 December. McLachlan made 24 appearances in total, including four in the Scottish First Division Play-offs. He was released by Rangers at the end of the season.

McLachlan appeared as a trialist for Clyde in their opening two league games against Peterhead and Stirling Albion in August 2009. He also appeared against Dumbarton a week later, scoring a long range free-kick in a 3–3 draw. He signed a one-year contract with Clyde in September 2009.

On Clyde's relegation to Division Three in 2010, McLachlan rejected terms with the club and was freed. He joined Junior side Lanark United and moved on to Kirkintilloch Rob Roy in 2011.

McLachlan moved to play football in Australia in March 2013, initially with Bulleen Lions before joining Melbourne Knights in July the same year.

On his return to Scotland, McLachlan signed for Junior side Irvine Meadow.
