= Murray Henderson (footballer) =

Scottish footballer

Personal information
- Full name: Murray Henderson
- Date of birth: 15 June 1980 (age 46)
- Place of birth: Lanark, Scotland
- Position: Defender

Senior career*
Years	Team	Apps	(Gls)
- Balmore Amateurs
2003–2006	Stranraer	105	(12)
2006–2007	Queen of the South	14	(1)
2007–2009	Ayr United	33	(1)
2009	→ Arthurlie (loan)		
2009–2010	Stranraer	29	(1)
2010–	Clyde	7	(0)
- * Club domestic league appearances and goals as of 3 January 2011

Murray Henderson (born 15 June 1980 in Lanark) is a Scottish right sided defender. His most recent club was Clyde, who he left in December 2010 in order to take up a role based in Dubai as part of his full-time job.

== Career ==
Henderson's previous clubs include Balmore and Stranraer. He impressed manager Ian McCall when playing and scoring for Stranraer versus Dundee United and again in the encounters with his former side Stranraer, which he captained.

After a long spell on the sidelines at Queens with an ankle injury, he struggled to break into the first team and was released at the end of season 2006–2007. He signed for Ayr United, following Queen of the South and Stranraer teammate Barry John Corr. Henderson signed for Clyde in May 2010.
