= Daniel McKay =

Scottish footballer

Personal information
- Full name: Daniel Mckay
- Date of birth: 16 April 1991 (age 35)
- Place of birth: Scotland
- Position: Striker

Senior career*
Years	Team	Apps	(Gls)
2009–2012	Kilmarnock	0	(0)
2009–2010	→ Arbroath (loan)	0	(0)
2010	→ Ayr United (loan)	13	(4)
2010	→ Ayr United (loan)	12	(3)
2011	→ Brechin City (loan)	16	(0)
2012	Albion Rovers	8	(0)
2012–2013	Arthurlie		
2013–2015	Beith Juniors		
2015–2017	Neilston Juniors		
2017	Irvine Meadow		
2018–2019	Troon	35	(11)
2019–2020	Arthurlie		
2020–202?	Benburb		
- * Club domestic league appearances and goals

Daniel McKay is a Scottish professional footballer, playing as a striker.

== Career ==
McKay started his career at Kilmarnock and was named the first Clydesdale Bank under-19 League "Rising Star" of the 2009–10 Scottish Premier League season.

In December 2009, McKay had a one-month loan spell at Arbroath but made no appearances due to the inclement weather in Scotland.

McKay spent the first half of the 2010–11 season on loan at Ayr United, after a prior successful spell the previous season. After his loan deal expired he was then sent on loan to Brechin City for the remainder of the season.

In January 2012, he was released by Kilmarnock and subsequently signed for Albion Rovers.

McKay joined Junior side Arthurlie in September 2012 before moving on to Beith Juniors in March the following year. He signed for Neilston Juniors in January 2015.

After a brief spell at Irvine Meadow, McKay signed for Troon on 11 January 2018.

== Personal life ==
He is the brother of fellow footballer Barrie McKay.
