= Dean Keenan =

Scottish footballer

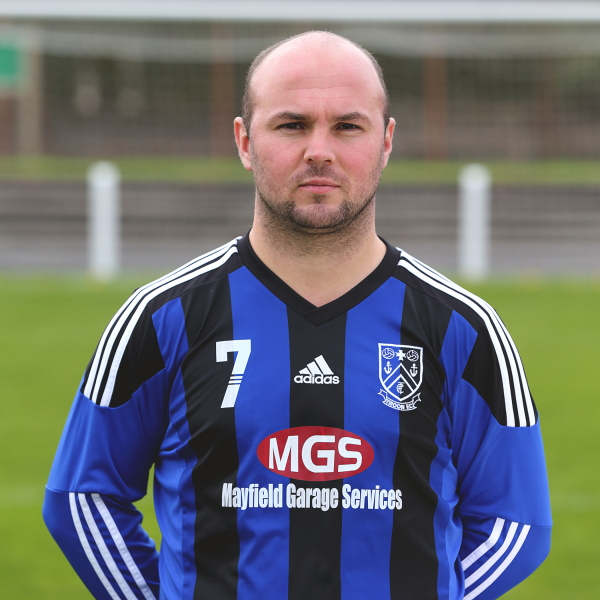

Personal information
- Full name: Dean Matthew Keenan
- Date of birth: 15 October 1985 (age 41)
- Place of birth: Glasgow, Scotland
- Position: Defender

Team information
- Current team: Troon (assistant manager)

Senior career*
Years	Team	Apps	(Gls)
2002–2008	Greenock Morton	53	(1)
2007–2008	→ Ayr United (loan)	15	(0)
2008–2012	Ayr United	76	(2)
2011	→ Kirkintilloch Rob Roy (loan)	3	(0)
2012–2021	Troon	?	(?)
- * Club domestic league appearances and goals as of 30 October 2019

Dean Matthew Keenan (born 15 October 1985, Glasgow, Scotland) is a Scottish former footballer who is currently assistant manager at Troon. He previously played for Ayr United and Greenock Morton.

== Early life ==
Keenan grew up in Mosspark on Glasgow's Southside and attended Our Lady of the Rosary RC Primary School and later Lourdes Secondary School. Keenan began his professional football career at Greenock Morton in 2002.

== Playing career ==
=== Greenock Morton ===
After signing for Morton in the summer of 2002, Keenan made his début for the club in a cup-tie against Queen of the South and was subsequently shown a red card following his tackle on former Celtic winger Brian McLaughlin. During his spell at Cappielow, Keenan operated in a number of roles but mainly either in defence or midfield.

=== Ayr United ===
Keenan was loaned out to Second Division side Ayr United during the January 2008 transfer window. He joined Ayr United permanently in May 2008.

Keenan scored in the Ayrshire derby. In season 2010-11 he had a cruciate knee ligament injury. He was signed on again for season 2011-12.

In October 2011, as he was due to have cartilage surgery, he was loaned out to Scottish Junior Football West Premier League side Kirkintilloch Rob Roy until January 2012. He was released by Ayr United in early 2012.

=== Troon ===
After being released by Ayr, Keenan signed for Junior side Troon.

Keenan was appointed Player/Assistant Manager in June 2019.

== Honours ==
=== Greenock Morton ===
- Scottish Football League 1: 1

2006–07

=== Greenock Morton ===
- Scottish Football League 2: 1

2002-03

=== Individual ===
- Troon Player of the Year: 1

2017-18
