= Mark Roberts (footballer, born 1975) =

Scottish footballer and coach

Personal information
- Full name: Mark Roberts
- Date of birth: 29 October 1975 (age 50)
- Place of birth: Irvine, Scotland
- Position: Striker

Team information
- Current team: Troon

Youth career
- 1991–1992: Bellfield BC

Senior career*
Years	Team	Apps	(Gls)
1992–2000	Kilmarnock	101	(15)
1999	→ Raith Rovers (loan)	3	(1)
2000–2001	Falkirk	25	(9)
2001–2002	Airdrieonians	36	(12)
2002	Shelbourne	27	(5)
2003	St Mirren	13	(3)
2003–2005	Airdrie United	62	(3)
2005–2009	Partick Thistle	104	(30)
2009–2014	Ayr United	136	(43)
2015–2016	Clyde	9	(1)
2016–2018	Hurlford United	67	(11)
2020–	Troon		

Managerial career
- 2012–2014: Ayr United (player-manager)
- 2018–2019: Queen's Park
- * Club domestic league appearances and goals as of 25 August 2018

Mark Roberts (born 29 October 1975 in Irvine) is a Scottish football player and coach.

Roberts' playing career was mainly based in Scottish football, with spells at Kilmarnock, Falkirk, Airdrieonians, Partick Thistle, St Mirren, Airdrie United and Ayr United. He also had a spell at Shelbourne in the Republic of Ireland. In 2012, Roberts was appointed player/manager of Ayr United, a position he held until his departure from the club in 2014. He then had a stint as head coach of Queen's Park.

== Playing career ==
Roberts spent his youth career with Bellfield Boys Club in Kilmarnock during the 1991–92 season. He signed for Kilmarnock F.C. at the start of the 1992–93 season and stayed for 8 seasons. Roberts made 101 league appearances and scored 15 league goals. During 1999, Roberts was loaned out to Raith Rovers by Kilmarnock, where he made 3 league appearances and scored one league goal.

Roberts signed for Falkirk at the start of the 2000–01 season and stayed for one season, where he made 25 league appearances and scored 9 league goals. He then signed for Airdrieonians at the start of the 2001–02 season and made 36 league appearances and scored 12 league goals. Airdrieonians went out of business at the end of the season. He then signed for Dublin club Shelbourne. He played in the League of Ireland Premier Division in the summer of 2002.

Roberts signed for Paisley club St Mirren in the January 2003 transfer window for the remainder of the 2002–03 season. He made 13 league appearances and scored 3 league goals for the Paisley club. Roberts signed for Airdrie United at the start of the 2003–04 season and stayed for two seasons, where he made 62 league appearances and scored 3 league goals.

Roberts signed for Partick Thistle at the start of the 2005–06 season. Roberts scored a brace in his first game against Dumbarton. Roberts scored 22 goals during his first season at Firhill, as Partick Thistle gained promotion to the Scottish First Division via the play-offs. Roberts was one of 5 nominees for the Scottish First Division Player of the Year Award for the 2006–07 season. Roberts made 104 league appearances for Partick Thistle in his 4 seasons at the club and scored 30 league goals, as well as 17 goals in other competitions. His 47 goals for Thistle ensured that the Jags fans would hold him in high regard long after he left the club, particularly as many saw him as the player that led Thistle to promotion to the First Division.

Roberts signed for Ayr United in January 2009. On 18 September 2010, Roberts made history when he scored three penalty kicks for Ayr in a league fixture with East Fife. Roberts was sent off after a confrontation whilst celebrating his third. On 18 January 2011, Roberts scored the goal that sent SPL side Hibernian out of the Scottish Cup.

On 27 February 2015, Roberts signed for Scottish League Two club Clyde, having already played three times for the club as a trialist.

After leaving a coaching role with Clyde in August 2016, Roberts resumed his playing career at Junior side Hurlford United. He left the club in August 2018 to become assistant manager at Queen's Park.

On 5 February 2020, Roberts rejoined Hurlford United before departing upon the expiry of his contract in the summer of 2020.

Roberts signed for Troon ahead of their debut in senior football in September 2020.

== Coaching career ==
=== Ayr United ===
On 15 May 2012, it was announced that Ayr would not renew the contract of Brian Reid, and that Roberts would replace him as manager for the 2012–13 season. Despite, winning the League 1 manager of the month award in August of the same year, Roberts was sacked by Ayr United in December 2014, with the club sitting in ninth place out of 10 clubs in Scottish League One.

=== Queen's Park ===
Roberts joined Queen's Park in August 2018 as an assistant to Gus MacPherson. After MacPherson left the club to join St. Mirren in September 2018 he took caretaker charge and was then appointed head coach on 12 October. Roberts left Queen's Park by mutual consent in December 2019.

== Honours ==
Kilmarnock

- Scottish Football League First Division promotion 1992–93

Airdrieonians

- Scottish Challenge Cup: 2001–02

Shelbourne

- League of Ireland Premier Division champions 2001–02

Partick Thistle

- Scottish Football League First Division play-off winners 2005–06

Ayr United

- Scottish Football League First Division play-off winners 2010–11

== Statistics ==
=== Manager ===
As of 28 December 2019

Team	Nat	From	To	Record				
Team	Nat	From	To	G	W	D	L	Win %
Ayr United	(Scotland)	May 2012	December 2014	102	35	14	53	34.31
Queen's Park	(Scotland)	September 2018	December 2019	59	17	17	25	28.81
Total				161	52	31	78	32.30

- Spell at Queen's Park was initially caretaker until permanent appointment on 12 October 2018.
