= Brian Reid (footballer) =

Scottish footballer (born 1970)

Personal information
- Full name: Brian Robertson Reid
- Date of birth: 15 June 1970 (age 56)
- Place of birth: Paisley, Scotland
- Position: Defender

Youth career
- Renfrew Waverley

Senior career*
Years	Team	Apps	(Gls)
1988–1991	Greenock Morton	57	(1)
1991–1996	Rangers	5	(0)
1994	→ Newcastle United (loan)	0	(0)
1996–1998	Greenock Morton	61	(3)
1998–1999	Burnley	31	(3)
1999–2001	Dunfermline Athletic	25	(3)
2001	→ Blackpool (loan)	13	(0)
2001–2002	Blackpool	42	(2)
2003	Falkirk	8	(0)
2003–2006	Queen of the South	66	(1)
2006–2007	Ayr United	15	(0)
Total		323	(13)

International career
1991	Scotland U21	2	(0)

Managerial career
- 2007–2012: Ayr United
- 2013–2014: Global
- 2013–2014: Philippines U23
- 2014: Nuneaton Town
- 2014–2015: Coventry U18
- 2015–2017: Stranraer
- 2018: Pafos (Assistant)
- 2020–2023: Albion Rovers
- * Club domestic league appearances and goals

Brian Robertson Reid (born 15 June 1970) is a Scottish football manager and former player who most recently managed Albion Rovers.

His lengthy playing career saw him with spells at Greenock Morton (two spells), Rangers, Newcastle United, Burnley, Dunfermline Athletic, Blackpool, Falkirk, Queen of the South and finishing at Ayr United.

He began his managerial career with his last playing club Ayr United before moving abroad to take charge of Filipino club Global F.C. After a spell in charge of the Philippines under 23 squad, he also had a short spell with English club Nuneaton Town before his return to Scotland to manage Scottish League One side Stranraer until 2017. Reid was appointed Albion Rovers manager in June 2020.

== Playing career ==
Reid, a central defender, started his career at Morton. After winning the Cappielow club's player of the season award, Reid became Graeme Souness's last signing for Rangers. Reid suffered a cruciate ligament knee injury shortly after signing for the Ibrox club, however, which almost finished his career. Reid was played sparingly for Rangers, who eventually loaned him out to Newcastle United in 1994 but he made no first-team appearances for the St James' Park club.

After returning to Morton in 1996 for two seasons, Reid went on to play for Burnley, Dunfermline Athletic, Blackpool (on loan initially, then signed permanently), Falkirk, Queen of the South and Ayr United.

== Coaching career ==
Reid was appointed manager of Ayr United in October 2007. In his first full season in charge of the Honest Men, Reid took them up to the First Division following play-off victories over Brechin City and Airdrie United; however, Ayr failed to remain in the First Division, finishing bottom, and were relegated after one season.

In the seasonal playoffs of the 2010–11 season "The Honest Men" were once again promoted to the first Division after a 2–1 win. Ayr were relegated to the Second Division in 2012 after they lost in the playoffs semifinals following a ninth-place finish in the First Division, and Reid's contract was not renewed. It was announced that in the 2012–13 season, he would be replaced by Mark Roberts, who signed for Ayr as a player in January 2009.

In January 2013, Philippine side Global FC acquired Reid to handle the team as part of their participation in the 2013 AFC President's Cup. Global FC is one of the two Southeast Asian clubs in the competition for clubs for "emerging nations" in Asia.

In March 2013, Reid was featured on the official Global FC website where he revealed his life story, football and career experiences. The interview also focused on how he ended up in the Philippines, his plans for the club and other coaching strategies. Global FC is Reid's first coaching job in the international arena.

In April 2014, Reid was appointed manager of Conference National side Nuneaton Town. He lasted just five months in the job and left Nuneaton by mutual consent on 8 September 2014.

On 29 May 2015, Reid was appointed manager of Scottish League One side Stranraer, following the departure of Stephen Aitken to Dumbarton. After a series of disappointing results which left the club bottom of League One, Reid resigned as manager on 16 January 2017. In 2018, Reid joined Steven Pressley's coaching squad at Pafos FC.

Reid was appointed Albion Rovers manager in June 2020. He was sacked by Albion Rovers on 25 March 2023, after a defeat by Bonnyrigg Rose meant that the club had fallen to the bottom position of League Two.

== Managerial statistics ==
As of 25 March 2022

Team	Nat	From	To	Record				
Team	Nat	From	To	G	W	D	L	Win %
Ayr United	(Scotland)	October 2007	May 2012	224	88	56	80	39.29
Nuneaton Town	(England)	April 2014	September 2014	10	2	2	6	20.00
Stranraer	(Scotland)	May 2015	January 2017	73	28	10	35	38.36
Albion Rovers	(Scotland)	June 2020	March 2023	107	29	23	55	27.10
Total				413	146	91	176	35.35

British statistics only.

== Honours ==
=== Player ===
Blackpool

- Football League Third Division play-offs: 2001

Dunfermline Athletic

- Scottish First Division promotion: 1999–2000

=== Manager ===
Ayr United

- Scottish First Division play-offs: 2008–09; 2010–11 (promoted to second tier)

Global FC

- UFL Division One runner-up: 2013
