= 2007–08 Airdrie United F.C. season =

Airdrie United
2007–08 season
- Chairman: Jim Ballantyne
- Manager: Kenny Black
- Stadium: Excelsior Stadium
- Scottish Second Division: Second Place (Promoted)
- Scottish Cup: Fourth round
- League Cup: First round
- Challenge Cup: Quarter-final
- Top goalscorer: League: Allan Russell (19); All: Allan Russell (26)

Season 2007–08 was Airdrie United's sixth competitive season. They competed in the Second Division, Challenge Cup, League Cup and the Scottish Cup.

== Summary ==
Airdrie United finished second in the Second Division, entering the play-offs losing 3–0 to Clyde on aggregate. Despite losing in the playoff, they were promoted to the first division due to Gretna's forced relegation due to going into administration and being unable to prove they could complete fixtures. They reached the fourth round of the Scottish Cup, the first round of the League Cup and reached the quarterfinal of the Challenge Cup losing 2–0 to Dunfermline Athletic.

== League table ==
Pos	Team	Pld	W	D	L	GF	GA	GD	Pts	Promotion, qualification or relegation
1	Ross County (C, P)	36	22	7	7	78	44	+34	73	Promotion to the First Division
2	Airdrie United (P)	36	20	6	10	64	34	+30	66	Qualification for the First Division Play-offs (Note: The 2nd, 3rd and 4th placed teams will be entered into a play-off with the First Division's 9th placed team. The winning team were awarded a place in the 2008–09 First Division, Clyde won the play-off to stay in the division. However, with Gretna being relegated to the Third Division, Airdrie were promoted to Division One. Airdrie United won promotion to the First Division after Gretna were relegated to the Third Division.)
3	Raith Rovers	36	19	3	14	60	50	+10	60	Qualification for the First Division Play-offs
4	Alloa Athletic	36	16	8	12	57	56	+1	56	Qualification for the First Division Play-offs
5	Peterhead	36	16	7	13	65	54	+11	55	

Source: SPFL Archive
Rules for classification: 1) points; 2) goal difference; 3) number of goals scored.
(C) Champions; (P) Promoted

== Results and fixtures ==
Win Draw Loss

=== Second Division ===
4 August 2007 SFL2	Airdrie United	0–1	Raith Rovers	Excelsior Stadium
15:00		BBC Report	Andrews 10'	Attendance: 1,645; Referee: Finnie

11 August 2007 SFL2	Alloa Athletic	0–6	Airdrie United	Recreation Park
15:00		ESPN Report	McKeown 19', 38'; Noble 31'; Russell 48'; McDonald 51'; Holmes 71'	Attendance: 801; Referee: Law

18 August 2007 SFL2	Berwick Rangers	2–0	Airdrie United	Shielfield Park
15:00	McLeish 7'; Gemmill 28'	BBC Report		Attendance: 678; Referee: Charleston

25 August 2007 SFL2	Airdrie United	1–0	Queen's Park	Excelsior Stadium
15:00	Noble 53'	BBC Report		Attendance: 1,148; Referee: Conroy

1 September 2007 SFL2	Ross County	1–1	Airdrie United	Victoria Park
15;00	Barrowman 39'	ESPN Report	Noble 31'	Attendance: 2,094; Referee: Underhill

15 September 2007 SFL2	Airdrie United	1–1	Peterhead	Excelsior Stadium
15:00	Russell 55'	BBC Report	Mackay 33'	Attendance: 936; Referee: McKendrick

22 September 2007 SFL2	Airdrie United	2–1	Brechin City	Excelsior Stadium
15:00	Prunty 53'; Waddell 75'	BBC Report	Geddes 81' (Penalty)	Attendance: 872; Referee: Nicholls

29 September 2007 SFL2	Cowdenbeath	1–1	Airdrie United	Central Park
15:00	Clarke 5'	BBC Report	Noble 55'	Attendance: 493; Referee: Boyd

6 October 2007 SFL2	Airdrie United	0–0	Ayr United	Excelsior Stadium
15:00		BBC Report		Attendance: 1,269; Referee: Smith

20 October 2007 SFL2	Raith Rovers	2–1	Airdrie United	Stark's Park
15;00	Weir 63' (Penalty); Sloan 84'	BBC Report	McKeown 21'	Attendance: 1,729; Referee: Norris

27 October 2007 SFL2	Airdrie United	4–0	Berwick Rangers	Excelsior Stadium
15:00	Russell 17'; Noble 34'; McKeown 42' (Penalty), 61'	BBC Report		Attendance: 850; Referee: Law

3 November 2007 SFL2	Queen's Park	0–1	Airdrie United	Hampden Park
15;00		BBC Report	Russell 38'	Attendance: 1,211; Referee: Winter

10 November 2007 SFL2	Airdrie United	0–1	Ross County	Excelsior Stadium
15:00		BBC Report	Shields 80'	Attendance: 1,062; Referee: Tumilty

1 December 2007 SFL2	Peterhead	0–1	Airdrie United	Balmoor Stadium
15:00		BBC Report	Russell 36'	Attendance: 689; Referee: MacKay

8 December 2007 SFL2	Airdrie United	3–1	Cowdenbeath	Excelsior Stadium
15:00	McDougall 18'; Noble 36'; Russell 79'	BBC Report	McConalogue 3'	Attendance: 823; Referee: Finnie

15 December 2007 SFL2	Brechin City	4–2	Airdrie United	Glebe Park
15:00	White 21'; Callaghan 66'; Smith 67'; King 80'	BBC Report	Noble 33'; Russell 49'	Attendance: 434; Referee: Norris

26 December 2007 SFL2	Airdrie United	2–0	Alloa Athletic	Excelsior Stadium
15:00	Noble 6'; McDonald 48'	BBC Report		Attendance: 934; Referee: Charleston

29 December 2007 SFL2	Berwick Rangers	2–4	Airdrie United	Shielfield Park
15:00	Swanson 56' (Penalty); Diack 66'	BBC Report	McKeown 2' (Penalty); Russell 15', 25'; McDonald 26'	Attendance: 672; Referee: Boyle

2 January 2008 SFL2	Airdrie United	3–2	Queen's Park	Excelsior Stadium
15:00	McDonald 47'; Russell 57'; McDougall 89'	ESPN Report	Trouten 7' (Penalty); Cairney 17'	Attendance: 1,244; Referee: O'Reilly

5 January 2008 SFL2	Airdrie United	2–0	Peterhead	Excelsior Stadium
15;00	Watt 80', 85'	BBC Report		Attendance: 892; Referee: Law

19 January 2008 SFL2	Ross County	3–2	Airdrie United	Victoria Park, Dingwall
15:00	Barrowman 25', 90'; Golabek 55'	BBC Report	McDonald 2'; Noble 58'	Attendance: 2,319; Referee: Finnie

26 January 2008 SFL2	Alloa Athletic	1–2	Airdrie United	Recreation Park
15:00	Scott 77'	BBC Report	Russell 18'; Prunty 61'	Attendance: 769; Referee: Winter

2 February 2008 SFL2	Airdrie United	3–0	Raith Rovers	Excelsior Stadium
15:00	Smith 50'; Prunty 68'; Russell 75'	BBC Report		Attendance: 1,252; Referee: Hornby

9 February 2008 SFL2	Cowdenbeath	0–1	Airdrie United	Central Park
15:00		BBC Report	Noble 58'	Attendance: 475; Referee: Muir

16 February 2008 SFL2	Airdrie United	1–2	Brechin City	Excelsior Stadium
15:00	Noble 88'	BBC Report	Smith 57'; King 79'	Attendance: 997; Referee: Boyd

27 February 2008 SFL2	Ayr United	1–1	Airdrie United	Somerset Park
19:45	Forrest 67'	ESPN Report	McDonald 44'	Attendance: 1,104; Referee: Nicholls

1 March 2008 SFL2	Queen's Park	0–2	Airdrie United	Hampden Park
15:00		BBC Report	Russell 61', 80'	Attendance: 913; Referee: Somers

5 March 2008 SFL2	Airdrie United	3–0	Berwick Rangers	Excelsior Stadium
19:45	Russell 10', 11', 62'	BBC Report		Attendance: 611; Referee: Muir

15 March 2008 SFL2	Raith Rovers	1–0	Airdrie United	Stark's Park
15:00	Goodwillie 20'	BBC Report		Attendance: 1,458; Referee: McKendrick

19 March 2008 SFL2	Airdrie United	0–2	Ayr United	Excelsior Stadium
19:45		BBC Report	McLeod 53'; Stevenson 69'	Attendance: 737; Referee: Brown

22 March 2008 SFL2	Peterhead	1–4	Airdrie United	Balmoor Stadium
15:00	Anderson 84'	BBC Report	Noble 32'; Russell 33'; Watt 48', 50'	Attendance: 550; Referee: Charleston

5 April 2008 SFL2	Brechin City	2–1	Airdrie United	Glebe Park
15:00	Paton 7'; Walker 87'	BBC Report	Noble 3'	Attendance: 466; Referee: Freeland

9 April 2008 SFL2	Airdrie United	2–0	Ross County	Excelsior Stadium
19;45	Noble 23'; Russell 56'	BBC Report		Attendance: 724; Referee: Salmond

15 April 2008 SFL2	Airdrie United	4–0	Cowdenbeath	Excelsior Stadium
19:45	Andreoni 20'; Holmes 36'; Prunty 60'; Waddell 79'	BBC Report		Attendance: 735; Referee: Law

19 April 2008 SFL2	Airdrie United	1–1	Alloa Athletic	Excelsior Stadium
15:00	Prunty 59'	BBC Report	MacAulay 21'	Attendance: 928; Referee: Tumilty

26 April 2008 SFL2	Ayr United	1–2	Airdrie United	Somerset Park
15:00	Forrest 3'	BBC Report	Gillies 8'; Andreoni 76' (Penalty)	Attendance: 1,333; Referee: Conroy

=== First Division play-offs ===
30 April 2008 Play-offs SF R1	Raith Rovers	0–2	Airdrie United	Stark's Park
19:45		Report	Russell 31' 39'	Attendance: 2,841; Referee: McDonald

3 May 2008 Play-offs SF R2	Airdrie United	2–2	Raith Rovers	Excelsior Stadium
15:00	Prunty 10'; Donnelly 77'	Report	Weir 18' 81' (pen.)	Attendance: 2,077; Referee: Thomson

7 May 2008 Play-offs Final R1	Airdrie United	0–1	Clyde	Excelsior Stadium
19:45		Report	Clarke 77'	Attendance: 1,878; Referee: Brines

10 May 2008 Play-offs Final R2	Clyde	2–0	Airdrie United	Broadwood Stadium
15:00	McSwegan 47'; Clarke 65'	Report		Attendance: 2,548; Referee: Underhill

=== Challenge Cup ===
14 August 2007 Challenge Cup R1	Stenhousemuir	1–3	Airdrie United	Ochilview Park
	Dempster 59'	BBC Sport	McEwan 16' (o.g.); Lyle 82' (o.g.); Noble 85'	Attendance: 583; Referee: Allan

4 September 2007 Challenge Cup R2	Airdrie United	5–1	Arbroath	Excelsior Stadium
	Russell 15', 61', 85' (Penalty), 86'; McDonald 26'	BBC Sport	Tosh 37'; Rennie (red card) 89'	Attendance: 754; Referee: Muir

18 September 2007 Challenge Cup QF	Airdrie United	0–2	Dunfermline Athletic	Excelsior Stadium
	McKeown (red card) 86'	BBC Sport	Burchill 54', 81'; Woods (red card) 86'	Attendance: 931; Referee: Tumilty

=== League Cup ===
8 August 2007 League Cup R1	Partick Thistle	2–1	Airdrie United	Firhill Stadium
	Harkins 14'; Murray 89'	BBC Sport	McKenna 62'	Attendance: 2,125; Referee: Richmond

=== Scottish Cup ===
24 November 2007 Scottish Cup R3	Airdrie United	1–1	Queen's Park	Excelsior Stadium
15:00	McKeown 57'	BBC Sport	Ferry 70'	Attendance: 1,016; Referee: Boyle

4 December 2007 Scottish Cup R3 Replay	Queen's Park	2–4 (a.e.t.)	Airdrie United	Hampden Park
19:45	Trouten 75'; Ferry 90'	BBC Sport	McDonald 15'; Noble 17'; Russell 97'; Watt 109'	Attendance: 579; Referee: Boyle

28 January 2008 Scottish Cup R4	Airdrie United	0–2	Kilmarnock	Excelsior Stadium
19:45	Smith (yellow card) 78' (yellow-red card) 83'	BBC Sport	Hamill 25'; Nish 37' (pen.)	Attendance: 3,258; Referee: McDonald

== Player statistics ==
=== Squad ===
No.	Pos	Nat	Player	Total		Second Division		Scottish Cup		League Cup		Other^{[a]}		
No.	Pos	Nat	Player	Apps	Goals	Apps	Goals	Apps	Goals	Apps	Goals	Apps	Goals	
	GK	(Scotland) SCO	Stephen Robertson	45	0	34	0	3	0	1	0	7	0	
	GK	(Scotland) SCO	Lee Hollis	3	0	3	0	0	0	0	0	0	0	
	DF	(Scotland) SCO	Stephen McKenna	37	1	30	0	3	0	1	1	3	0	
	DF	(Scotland) SCO	James Sharp	9	0	8	0	0	0	1	0	0	0	
	DF	(Scotland) SCO	Bobby Donnelly	29	3	25	0	3	0	0	0	0	3	1
	DF	(Scotland) SCO	Steven Campbell	9	0	8	0	0	0	0	0	1	0	
	DF	(Scotland) SCO	William Soutar	2	0	2	0	0	0	0	0	0	0	
	DF	(Scotland) SCO	Fraser Craig	1	0	1	0	0	0	0	0	0	0	
	DF	(Scotland) SCO	Chris McMenamin	2	0	2	0	0	0	0	0	0	0	
	DF	(Scotland) SCO	Paul Lovering	40	0	30	0	2	0	1	0	7	0	
	DF	(Scotland) SCO	Marc Smyth	39	0	28	0	3	0	1	0	7	0	
	DF	(Scotland) SCO	Paul Byrne	1	0	1	0	0	0	0	0	0	0	
	MF	(Scotland) SCO	Marco Andreoni	22	3	17	3	1	0	0	0	4	0	
	MF	(Scotland) SCO	Darren Smith	42	1	32	1	2	0	1	0	7	0	
	MF	(England) ENG	Kevin McDonald	44	8	33	6	3	1	1	0	7	1	
	MF	(Scotland) SCO	Calum Brady	4	0	4	0	0	0	0	0	0	0	
	MF	(Scotland) SCO	Stephen McKeown	21	7	15	6	2	1	1	0	3	0	
	MF	(Scotland) SCO	Graeme Holmes	29	2	19	2	2	0	1	0	7	0	
	MF	(Scotland) SCO	Ricky Waddell	44	1	33	1	3	0	1	0	7	0	
	FW	(Scotland) SCO	Steven McDougall	23	2	17	2	2	0	1	0	3	0	
	FW	(Scotland) SCO	Stuart Noble	45	16	34	14	3	1	1	0	7	1	
	FW	(Scotland) SCO	Kevin Watt	28	5	22	4	2	1	0	0	4	0	
	FW	(Scotland) SCO	Mark McCarry	1	0	1	0	0	0	0	0	0	0	
	FW	(Scotland) SCO	Bryan Prunty	41	6	32	5	3	0	0	0	6	1	
	FW	(Scotland) SCO	Allan Russell	43	26	32	19	3	1	1	0	7	6	
	FW	(Scotland) SCO	David Gillies	19	1	15	1	0	0	0	0	4	0	

a. Includes other competitive competitions, including playoffs and the Scottish Challenge Cup.
