= 2005–06 Airdrie United F.C. season =

Airdrie United
2005–06 season
- Chairman: Jim Ballantyne
- Manager: Sandy Stewart
- Stadium: Excelsior Stadium
- Scottish First Division: Sixth place
- Scottish Cup: Fourth round
- League Cup: First round
- Challenge Cup: Second round
- Top goalscorer: League: Bryan Prunty (15); All: Bryan Prunty (15)

Season 2005–06 was Airdrie United's fourth competitive season. They competed in the First Division, Challenge Cup, League Cup and the Scottish Cup.

== Summary ==
Airdrie United finished sixth in the First Division. They reached the fourth round of the Scottish Cup, the first round of the League Cup and were eliminated in the second round of the Challenge Cup.

== League table ==
Pos	Team	Pld	W	D	L	GF	GA	GD	Pts
4	Ross County	36	14	14	8	47	40	+7	56
5	Clyde	36	15	10	11	54	42	+12	55
6	Airdrie United	36	11	12	13	57	43	+14	45
7	Dundee	36	9	16	11	43	50	−7	43
8	Queen of the South	36	7	12	17	31	54	−23	33

Source: "2005-2006 First Division - SPFL Archive". SPFL.
Rules for classification: 1) points; 2) goal difference; 3) number of goals scored.

== Results and fixtures ==
Win Draw Loss

=== First Division ===
6 August 2005 SFL1	Stranraer	1–0	Airdrie United	Stair Park
15:00	Hamilton 37'	Report		Attendance: 855; Referee: Boyle

13 August 2005 SFL1	Airdrie United	0–1	Ross County	Excelsior Stadium
15:00		BBC Report	McGarry 49'	Attendance: 1,164; Referee: McCurry

20 August 2005 SFL1	Brechin City	1–1	Airdrie United	Glebe Park
15:00	Johnson 24'	Report	McKeown 80'	Attendance: 688; Referee: Hardie

27 August 2005 SFL1	Airdrie United	3–1	St Johnstone	Excelsior Stadium
15:00	McKeown 27' (Penalty); Prunty 61'; Twigg 83'	BBC Report	Scotland 23'	Attendance: 1,522; Referee: Allan

10 September 2005 SFL1	Dundee	0–2	Airdrie United	Dens Park
15:00		Report	McDougall 4'; Prunty 75'	Attendance: 4,198; Referee: Thomson

17 September 2005 SFL1	Hamilton Academical	1–1	Airdrie United	New Douglas Park
15:00	McKenzie	Report	McLaren 31'	Attendance: 2,229; Referee: Dougal

24 September 2005 SFL1	Airdrie United	0–1	St Mirren	Excelsior Stadium
15:00		Report	Adam 33'	Attendance: 2,073; Referee: Underhill

1 October 2005 SFL1	Airdrie United	1–3	Clyde	Excelsior Stadium
15:00	McKeown 75' (Penalty)	Clyde Report	Williams 3', 66'; Brighton 62'	Attendance: 1,603; Referee: Fyfe

7 October 2005 SFL1	Ross County	2–2	Airdrie United	Victoria Park
19:45	Rankin 36'; Winters 43'	Report	Twigg 8'; McLaren 73'	Attendance: 2,004; Referee: MacKay

15 October 2005 SFL1	Queen of the South	1–0	Airdrie United	Palmerston Park
15:00	Burns 90'	Report		Attendance: 1,638; Referee: Brines

22 October 2005 SFL1	Airdrie United	1–0	Stranraer	Excelsior Stadium
15:00	Prunty 60'	Report		Attendance: 1,100; Referee: McDonald

29 October 2005 SFL1	Airdrie United	4–0	Dundee	Excelsior Stadium
15:00	McPhee 1', 26'; McKeown 78' (Penalty); Hardie 83'	BBC Report		Attendance: 1,656; Referee: Murray

5 November 2005 SFL1	St Johnstone	1–0	Airdrie United	McDiarmid Park
15:00	Scotland 28'	Report		Attendance: 2,412; Referee: McCurry

12 November 2005 SFL1	Airdrie United	2–2	Hamilton Academical	Excelsior Stadium
15:00	McPhee 28'; McLaren 89'	BBC Report	Robertson 48'; Ferguson 60'	Attendance: 1,375; Referee: Richmond

26 November 2005 SFL1	Clyde	1–0	Airdrie United	Broadwood
15:00	McGowan 23'	Report		Attendance: 1,258; Referee: Thomson

29 November 2005 SFL1	St Mirren	1–1	Airdrie United	Love Street
	Van Zanten 5'	BBC Report	Docherty 11' (Penalty); Docherty (red card) 63'	Attendance: 2,941; Referee: Underhill

3 December 2005 SFL1	Airdrie United	4–0	Queen of the South	Excelsior Stadium
15:00	Prunty 11'; McLaren 27'; McPhee 79', 87'	Report		Attendance: 1,242; Referee: Hardie

10 December 2005 SFL1	Stranraer	1–1	Airdrie United	Stair Park
15:00	Sharp 75'	Report	McKeown 30' (Penalty)	Attendance: 633; Referee: Hunter

17 December 2005 SFL1	Airdrie United	6–0	Brechin City	Excelsior Stadium
15:00	Prunty 27', 47'; Hardie 59', 72', 87'; McLaren 77'	Report		Attendance: 1,106; Referee: Murray

26 December 2005 SFL1	Dundee	2–3	Airdrie United	Dens Park
	O'Reilly 22'; Mann 45'	BBC Report	Prunty 58', 88', 89'	Attendance: 4,378; Referee: Toner

31 December 2005 SFL1	Airdrie United	2–1	St Johnstone	Excelsior Stadium
14:00	McKeown 22' (Penalty); McLaren 35'	Report	Sheerin 19' (Penalty)	Attendance: 1,582; Referee: McDonald

2 January 2006 SFL1	Hamilton Academical	1–0	Airdrie United	New Douglas Park
	McLaughlin 25'	BBC Report		Attendance: 2,498; Referee: McCurry

14 January 2006 SFL1	Airdrie United	1–4	St Mirren	Excelsior Stadium
	McPhee 87'; DanMcManus (red card) 75'	Report	McKenna 23' (Own Goal); Anderson 61', 78'; Corcoran 71'	Attendance: 2,661

21 January 2006 SFL1	Airdrie United	1–1	Clyde	Excelsior Stadium
15:00	Prunty 11'	Report	Brighton 22'	Attendance: 1,623; Referee: McDonald

28 January 2006 SFL1	Queen of the South	2–0	Airdrie United	Palmerston Park
15:00	O'Neil 9' (Penalty); Burns 75'	Report		Attendance: 1,650; Referee: Richmond

11 February 2006 SFL1	Brechin City	0–0	Airdrie United	Glebe Park
15:00		Report		Attendance: 602; Referee: Smith

18 February 2006 SFL1	Airdrie United	2–3	Ross County	Excelsior Stadium
15:00	McPhee 32'; Prunty 65'	Report	Winters 4'; Higgins 45'; Cowie 59'	Attendance: 1,119; Referee: Freeland

4 March 2006 SFL1	St Johnstone	2–2	Airdrie United	McDiarmid Park
15:00	Hardie 61'; James 69'	BBC Report	Twigg 2'; Lovering 49'	Attendance: 2,216; Referee: Dougal

11 March 2006 SFL1	Airdrie United	7–0	Dundee	Excelsior Stadium
15;00	McLaren 15', 45', 78'; Twigg 17' (Penalty), 41'; McPhee 18'; Coyle 84'	BBC Report		Attendance: 1,127; Referee: Clark

18 March 2006 SFL1	Airdrie United	0–0	Hamilton Academical	Excelsior Stadium
15:00		BBC Report		Attendance: 1,326; Referee: Freeland

25 March 2006 SFL1	St Mirren	2–1	Airdrie United	Love Street
15:00	Sutton 9', 48'	Report	Prutny 43'	Attendance: 3,785

1 April 2006 SFL1	Clyde	3–1	Airdrie United	Broadwood
15;00	McHale 28' (Penalty); Bouadji 42'; Brighton 79'	Report	Prutny 85'	Attendance: 1,350; Referee: Clark

8 April 2006 SFL1	Airdrie United	1–1	Queen of the South	Excelsior Stadium
15:00	Twigg 6'	Report	Weir 58'	Attendance: 1,262; Referee: Collum

15 April 2006 SFL1	Airdrie United	3–0	Stranraer	Excelsior Stadium
15:00	McLaren 17'; Prutny 72'; Barkey 87'	Report		Attendance: 919; Referee: MacDonald

22 April 2006 SFL1	Ross County	0–1	Airdrie United	Victoria Park
15:00		Report	Twigg 52'	Attendance: 2,066; Referee: Toner

29 April 2006 SFL1	Airdrie United	3–3	Brechin City	Excelsior Stadium
15:00	Prutny 45'; McPhee 50'; McGowan 78'	Report	Devlin 32', 48'; Byers 69'	Attendance: 1,212; Referee: Boyle

=== Challenge Cup ===
30 August 2005 Scottish Challenge Cup R2	Dundee	1–1 (a.e.t.) (3 – 2 p)	Airdrie United	Dens Park
19:45	Robertson	Report	McPhee	Attendance: 1,857; Referee: Clark

=== League Cup ===
9 August 2005 League Cup R1	Raith Rovers	2–0	Airdrie United	Stark's Park
	Annand 6'; Jablonski 57'	BBC Report		Attendance: 1,237; Referee: McDonald

=== Scottish Cup ===
7 August 2006 Scottish Cup R3	Dunfermline Athletic	3–4	Airdrie United	East End Park
19:45	Mason 16'; Hunt 23'; Young 56'; Makel (yellow card) 62' (red card)	BBC Report	Docherty 31', 90'; Hardie 56'; McKeown 89' (Penalty)	Attendance: 3,805; Referee: Fyfe

4 February 2006 Scottish Cup R4	Airdrie United	1–1	Dundee	Excelsior Stadium
	McLaren 59'	BBC Report	Deasley 21'	Attendance: 3,557; Referee: Underhill

14 February 2006 Scottish Cup R4 Replay	Dundee	2–0	Airdrie United	Dens Park
	Deasley 8'; Lynch 71'	BBC Report		Attendance: 3,824; Referee: MacKay

== Player statistics ==
=== Squad ===
No.	Pos	Nat	Player	Total		First Division		Scottish Cup		League Cup		Other^{[a]}	
No.	Pos	Nat	Player	Apps	Goals	Apps	Goals	Apps	Goals	Apps	Goals	Apps	Goals
	GK	(Scotland) SCO	Stephen Robertson	28	0	25	0	3	0	0	0	0	0
	GK	(Scotland) SCO	Lee Hollis	13	0	11	0	0	0	1	0	1	0
	DF	(Scotland) SCO	Allan McManus	35	0	30	0	3	0	1	0	1	0
	DF	(Scotland) SCO	Stephen McKenna	36	0	32	0	3	0	0	0	1	0
	DF	(Scotland) SCO	Neil McGowan	40	1	35	1	3	0	1	0	1	0
	DF	(Scotland) SCO	Paul Lovering	32	1	28	1	3	0	1	0	0	0
	DF	(Scotland) SCO	Fraser Coyle	22	1	20	1	0	0	1	0	1	0
	MF	(Scotland) SCO	Colin Marshall	4	0	3	0	0	0	1	0	0	0
	MF	(Scotland) SCO	Martin Hardie	22	5	21	4	1	1	0	0	0	0
	MF	(Scotland) SCO	Stephen Docherty	30	2	25	0	3	2	1	0	1	0
	MF	(Scotland) SCO	Kevin Barkey	23	1	22	1	0	0	0	0	1	0
	MF	(Scotland) SCO	David Dunn	30	0	27	0	1	0	1	0	1	0
	MF	(Scotland) SCO	Stephen McKeown	36	8	31	7	3	1	1	0	1	0
	MF	(Scotland) SCO	Graeme Holmes	18	0	16	0	2	0	0	0	0	0
	MF	(Scotland) SCO	Stuart Taylor	6	0	6	0	0	0	0	0	0	0
	FW	(Scotland) SCO	Steven McDougall	36	1	31	1	3	0	1	0	1	0
	FW	(Scotland) SCO	Bryan Prunty	35	15	31	15	3	0	0	0	1	0
	FW	(Scotland) SCO	Brian McPhee	36	10	32	9	3	0	0	0	1	1
	FW	(Scotland) SCO	Willie McLaren	38	11	33	10	3	1	1	0	1	0
	FW	(Scotland) SCO	Gary Twigg	27	7	24	7	1	0	1	0	1	0
	FW	(Scotland) SCO	Mark Roberts	3	0	2	0	0	0	1	0	0	0
	FW	(Scotland) SCO	Henry Boyle	8	3	7	3	1	0	0	0	0	0

a. Includes other competitive competitions, including playoffs and the Scottish Challenge Cup.
