= Alistair Graham (disambiguation) =

Alistair Graham (born 1942) is a British civil servant who was Chairman of the Committee on Standards in Public Life.

Alistair or Ally Graham may also refer to:

- Ally Graham (born 1966), Scottish footballer
- Ally Graham (footballer, born 1993), Scottish footballer
- Alastair Graham (1906–2000), Scottish zoologist and malacologist
- Ali G, television character created by Sacha Baron Cohen
