= 2011–12 Dumbarton F.C. season =

Dumbarton
2011–12 season
- Chairman: Alan Jardine
- Manager: Alan Adamson
- Stadium: Strathclyde Homes Stadium
- Second Division: 3rd
- Challenge Cup: Second round (eliminated by Berwick Rangers)
- League Cup: First round (eliminated by Dundee)
- Scottish Cup: Third round (eliminated by Brechin City)
- Top goalscorer: League: Bryan Prunty (14); All: Bryan Prunty (17)
- Highest home attendance: 1,088 vs. Airdrie United, 21 April 2012
- Lowest home attendance: 406 vs. Airdrie United, 22 October 2011
Home colours	Away colours

The 2011–12 season was Dumbarton's third consecutive season in the Scottish Second Division, having been promoted from the Scottish Third Division at the end of the 2008–09 season. Dumbarton also competed in the Challenge Cup, League Cup and Scottish Cup.

== Summary ==
Dumbarton finished third in the Second Division, entering the play-offs winning 6–2 against Airdrie United on aggregate in the final and were promoted to the Scottish First Division. They reached the second round of the Challenge Cup, the first round of the League Cup and the third round of the Scottish Cup.

== Results & fixtures ==
Win Draw Loss

=== Pre-season / other matches ===
30 June 2011	Dumbarton	1–1	Stranraer	Glasgow Green, Glasgow
	Walker		(pen.)

7 July 2011	Dumbarton	6–3	Cambuslang Rangers	East Kilbride
	Agnew; Prunty; McElroy; Ramage	Dumbarton Report	Unknown; Unknown (pen.); Unknown

9 July 2011	Dumbarton	0–5	Motherwell	Strathclyde Homes Stadium
		Dumbarton Report	Murphy 8', 22'; Law 54'; McHugh 83'; Saunders 91'	Attendance: 814

12 July 2011	Dumbarton	0–2	St Mirren	Strathclyde Homes Stadium
		Dumbarton Report	Teale 4'; Thomson 24'	Attendance: 954; Referee: Gary Hilland

16 July 2011	Dumbarton	2–1	Alloa Athletic	Strathclyde Homes Stadium
	Craig Sutherland 8', 48'	Dumbarton Report	Campbell 86'

19 July 2011	Dumbarton	4–1	Partick Thistle	Strathclyde Homes Stadium
	Sutherland 27'; Agnew 68'; Scully 82'; Brannan 90'	Dumbarton Report	Burns 61' (pen.)	Attendance: 686; Referee: Steve Conroy

21 July 2011	Clydebank	2–0	Dumbarton	Holm Park, Clydebank
	Goal

4 October 2011	Clyde	0-5	Dumbarton	Broadwood Stadium
			Prunty; Walker; Nichol

15 November 2011	East Stirling	2-3	Dumbarton	Ochilview Park
	Goal		Walker

24 January 2012	Falkirk	1-2	Dumbarton	Falkirk Stadium
	Goal		Graham; Pearson

7 February 2012	Stranraer	0-2	Dumbarton	Stair Park
			Graham; McNiff

=== Scottish Challenge Cup ===
24 July 2011 Scottish Challenge Cup round 1	Dumbarton	3–2	East Stirlingshire	Strathclyde Homes Stadium
	Prunty 54'; Gilhaney 61' (pen.); Walker 90'	BBC Sport	Love 66'; Turner 70'	Attendance: 454; Referee: Paul Robertson

9 August 2011 Scottish Challenge Cup round 2	Dumbarton	0–2	Berwick Rangers	Strathclyde Homes Stadium
		BBC Sport	Greenhill 55'; Currie 89'	Attendance: 334; Referee: Craig Charleston

=== Scottish League Cup ===
30 July 2011 Scottish League Cup round 1	Dumbarton	0–4	Dundee	Strathclyde Homes Stadium
		BBC Sport	Milne 48', 73'; McCluskey 67'; Lockwood 84' (pen.)	Attendance: 870; Referee: John Beaton

=== Scottish Second Division ===
6 August 2011 Scottish Second Division	Airdrie United	3–0	Dumbarton	Excelsior Stadium
	Johnston 6', 63'; Donnelly 9'	BBC Sport		Attendance: 887; Referee: Norcroft

13 August 2011 Scottish Second Division	Dumbarton	1–5	Stirling Albion	Strathclyde Homes Stadium
	Agnew 8'	BBC Sport	Smith 5'; Cook 46'; Flood 48'; Dillon 56'; Crawley 69'	Attendance: 706; Referee: Richmond

20 August 2011 Scottish Second Division	Brechin City	3–3	Dumbarton	Glebe Park
	Fusco 46'; McManus 52' (pen.); McKenna 56'	BBC Sport	Agnew 11', 89'; Lyden 28'; Lithgow (red card) 51'	Attendance: 427; Referee: Roache

27 August 2011 Scottish Second Division	East Fife	0–6	Dumbarton	Bayview Stadium
		BBC Sport	McBride 17'; Prunty 20', 33', 79', 85'; Lyden 45'	Attendance: 635; Referee: McLean

10 September 2011 Scottish Second Division	Dumbarton	3–4	Arbroath	Strathclyde Homes Stadium
	Prunty 5'; Gilhaney 17'; Nicholl 38'	BBC Sport	Sibanda 14'; Swankie 27', 46'; Doris 68' (pen.)	Attendance: 640; Referee: Finnie

17 September 2011 Scottish Second Division	Dumbarton	0–4	Cowdenbeath	Strathclyde Homes Stadium
		BBC Sport	McKenzie 8'; Robertson 19'; Morton 68'; Linton 86'	Attendance: 615; Referee: Tumilty

24 September 2011 Scottish Second Division	Forfar Athletic	0–2	Dumbarton	Station Park
		BBC Sport	Winters 32'; Prunty 61'	Attendance: 493; Referee: Norris

15 October 2011 Scottish Second Division	Stenhousemuir	3–1	Dumbarton	Ochilview Park
	Rodgers 29'; McMillan 45', 77'	BBC Sport	Agnew 85'	Attendance: 529; Referee: Somers

18 October 2011 Scottish Second Division	Dumbarton	2–1	Albion Rovers	Strathclyde Homes Stadium
	McKinnon 13'; Agnew 51'	BBC Sport	Lawless 68'	Attendance: 406; Referee: Roache

22 October 2011 Scottish Second Division	Dumbarton	1–1	Airdrie United	Strathclyde Homes Stadium
	Gilhaney 29' (pen.)	BBC Sport	Stevenson 37'; Green (red card) 39'	Attendance: 775; Referee: Somers

29 October 2011 Scottish Second Division	Stirling Albion	0–1	Dumbarton	Doubletree Dunblane Stadium
		BBC Sport	Agnew 84'	Attendance: 602; Referee: Northcroft

5 November 2011 Scottish Second Division	Arbroath	4–3	Dumbarton	Gayfield Park
	McAnespie 21'; Malcolm 23'; Swankie 26'; Doris 79'	BBC Sport	McNiff 51', 83'; Agnew 65'	Attendance: 723; Referee: Northcroft

12 November 2011 Scottish Second Division	Dumbarton	3–0	East Fife	Strathclyde Homes Stadium
	Agnew 34'; Gilhaney 60'; Lithgow 68'	BBC Report		Attendance: 678; Referee: Hilland

26 November 2011 Scottish Second Division	Cowdenbeath	0–0	Dumbarton	Central Park
		BBC Report		Attendance: 271; Referee: Crawford

3 December 2011 Scottish Second Division	Dumbarton	1–1	Forfar Athletic	Strathclyde Homes Stadium
	Walker 16'	BBC Report	Motion 90+3'	Attendance: 443; Referee: Richmond

10 December 2011 Scottish Second Division	Albion Rovers	3–1	Dumbarton	Cliftonhill
	Gemmell 5', 25'; Love 60'	BBC Report	Prunty 37'	Attendance: 489; Referee: Colvin

2 January 2012 Scottish Second Division	Dumbarton	3–2	Arbroath	Strathclyde Homes Stadium
	Prunty 20'; Lithgow 84'; Walker 90'	BBC Report	Doris 26'; Falkingham 32'	Attendance: 585; Referee: Roache

14 January 2012 Scottish Second Division	Dumbarton	1–0	Brechin City	Strathclyde Homes Stadium
	Prunty 89'	BBC Report		Attendance: 572; Referee: Conroy

21 January 2012 Scottish Second Division	Airdrie United	2–3	Dumbarton	Excelsior Stadium
	Donnelly 15'; Boyle 36'; MacDonald (red card) 48'	BBC Report	Lithgow 34'; Agnew 67'; Walker 88'	Attendance: 743; Referee: Northcroft

11 February 2012 Scottish Second Division	Stenhousemuir	1–2	Dumbarton	Ochilview Park
	McMillan (red card) 10'; McKinlay (yellow card) 33' (red card); Smith 76'	SFL Report	Lithgow 36'; Devlin 45' (Own goal)	Attendance: 539; Referee: Beaton

14 February 2012 Scottish Second Division	Forfar Athletic	1–1	Dumbarton	Station Park
	Hilson 30'	SFL Report	Prunty 44'	Attendance: 284; Referee: Clancy

18 February 2012 Scottish Second Division	Dumbarton	1–0	Albion Rovers	Strathclyde Homes Stadium
	Prunty 61'	SFL Report		Attendance: 657; Referee: Somers

21 February 2012 Scottish Second Division	East Fife	1–2	Dumbarton	Bayview Stadium
	Linn 23'	SFL Report	Gilhaney 52'; Graham 79'	Attendance: 397; Referee: Finnie

25 February 2012 Scottish Second Division	Dumbarton	4–1	Stirling Albion	Dumbarton Football Stadium
	Graham 46'; Agnew 73'; Gilhaney 80', 87'	SFL Report	Davidson 3'; Davidson (red card) 56'	Attendance: 722; Referee: Winter

28 February 2012 Scottish Second Division	Dumbarton	3–0	Stenhousemuir	Dumbarton Football Stadium
	Prunty 1'; Gilhaney 32'; Agnew 74'	SFL Report		Attendance: 557; Referee: Charleston

3 March 2012 Scottish Second Division	Brechin City	2–2	Dumbarton	Glebe Park
	McManus 30'; McKenzie 34'	SFL Report	Prunty; Agnew	Attendance: 459; Referee: Robertson

6 March 2012 Scottish Second Division	Dumbarton	0–2	Cowdenbeath	Dumbarton Football Stadium
		SFL Report	Mbu 3'; McKenzie 73'	Attendance: 812; Referee: Hilland

10 March 2012 Scottish Second Division	Arbroath	2–0	Dumbarton	Gayfield Park
	Innes 24'; Doris 27'	SFL Report		Attendance: 842; Referee: Northcroft

17 March 2012 Scottish Second Division	Dumbarton	0–4	East Fife	Dumbarton Football Stadium
		SFL Report	Wallace 4', 24'; Grindlay 23' (Own goal); Dalziel 51'	Attendance: 713; Referee: Richmond

24 March 2012 Scottish Second Division	Cowdenbeath	4–1	Dumbarton	Central Park
	McKenzie 19', 81'; Coult 29'; Mbu 38'	SFL Report	Dargo 33'	Attendance: 380; Referee: Tumilty

31 March 2012 Scottish Second Division	Dumbarton	1–0	Forfar Athletic	Dumbarton Football Stadium
	Paterson 56' (o.g.)	SFL Report		Attendance: 513; Referee: O'Reilly

7 April 2012 Scottish Second Division	Albion Rovers	1–1	Dumbarton	Cliftonhill
	Ferry 20'	SFL Report	Agnew 38'	Attendance: 471; Referee: Roache

14 April 2012 Scottish Second Division	Dumbarton	0–2	Stenhousemuir	Dumbarton Football Stadium
		SFL Report	Ferguson 5' (pen.); Rodgers 11'	Attendance: 728; Referee: Clancy

21 April 2012 Scottish Second Division	Dumbarton	2–1	Airdrie United	Dumbarton Football Stadium
	Prunty 61'; Lovering 67' (Own goal)	SFL Report	McLaren 56'; Donnelly (red card) 91'	Attendance: 1,088; Referee: McKendrick

28 April 2012 Scottish Second Division	Stirling Albion	1–2	Dumbarton	Doubletree Dunblane Stadium
	Davidson 57'	SFL Report	Jacobs 78' (Own goal); Dargo 90'	Attendance: 709; Referee: McDermott

5 May 2012 Scottish Second Division	Dumbarton	4–2	Brechin City	Dumbarton Football Stadium
	Dargo 59', 62', 72'; Thomson 90'	SFL Report	King 53'; Molloy 88'	Attendance: 636; Referee: Winter

=== First Division play-offs ===
9 May 2012 Play-offs SF R1	Dumbarton	2–1	Arbroath	Dumbarton Football Stadium
	Wallace 16'; Prunty 61'	SFL Report	Malcolm 6'	Attendance: 911; Referee: Charleston

12 May 2012 Play-offs SF R2	Arbroath	0–0 (1–2 agg.)	Dumbarton	Gayfield Park
		SFL Report		Attendance: 1,454; Referee: Thomson

16 May 2012 Play-offs F R1	Dumbarton	2–1	Airdrie United	Dumbarton Football Stadium
	Prunty 29'; Wallace 32'; Nugent (yellow card) 93' (red card)	SFL Report	Bain 42'	Attendance: 1,746; Referee: Brines

20 May 2012 Play-offs F R2	Airdrie United	1–4 (2–6 agg.)	Dumbarton	Excelsior Stadium
	Holmes 35'; Bain (red card) 78'	SFL Report	Dargo 9', 21'; Gilhaney 45'; Wallace 65'	Attendance: 2,914; Referee: Muir

=== Scottish Cup ===
19 November 2011 Scottish Cup R3	Brechin City	3–0	Dumbarton	Glebe Park
	Molloy 26'; King 77'; McManus 93'	BBC Report		Attendance: 447; Referee: Beaton

=== Stirlingshire Cup ===
20 August 2011 Stirlingshire Cup SF	Dumbarton	6–2	Stenhousemuir	Dumbarton Football Stadium
	McBride 29', 54'; Winters 32'; Walker 61'; Wallace 68'; Metcalfe		Plenderleith 26'; Quinn	Attendance: 223; Referee: Euan Anderson

1 November 2011 Stirlingshire Cup F	Falkirk	1–1 (5–4 p)	Dumbarton	Falkirk Stadium
	Graham 9'		Winters 38'	Attendance: 923; Referee: Stephen Finnie

== Player statistics ==
=== Captains ===
No.	P	Name	Country	No. games	Notes
	DF	Paul Nugent	(Scotland)	36	Club captain
	FW	Bryan Prunty	(Scotland)	7	Vice-captain

Last updated: 16 May 2012
Source: Competitive match reports.
Competitive matches only
Matches started as captain only
Country: FIFA nationality; No.: Squad number; P: Position; Name: Player name; No. Games: Number of games started as captain.

=== Squad ===
Last updated 26 May 2012

No.	Pos	Nat	Player	Total		Scottish Second Division		Scottish Cup		League Cup		Other^{[a]}	
No.	Pos	Nat	Player	Apps	Goals	Apps	Goals	Apps	Goals	Apps	Goals	Apps	Goals
	GK	(Scotland) SCO	Jamie Ewings	11	0	9+0	0	1+0	0	0+0	0	1+0	0
	GK	(Scotland) SCO	Stephen Grindlay	32	0	26+0	0	0+0	0	1+0	0	5+0	0
	GK	(France) FRA	Arnaud Gastal	1	0	1+0	0	0+0	0	0+0	0	0+0	0
	DF	(Scotland) SCO	James Creaney	37	0	32+0	0	1+0	0	0+0	0	4+0	0
	DF	(Scotland) SCO	Robert Connolly	0	0	0+0	0	0+0	0	0+0	0	0+0	0
	DF	(Scotland) SCO	Ross McKinnon	8	1	6+1	1	1+0	0	0+0	0	0+0	0
	DF	(Scotland) SCO	Kevin Nicoll	34	1	26+2	1	0+0	0	1+0	0	5+0	0
	DF	(Scotland) SCO	Paul Nugent	39	0	30+3	0	1+0	0	1+0	0	4+0	0
	DF	(Scotland) SCO	Tony Wallace	30	3	16+6	0	1+0	0	0+1	0	4+2	3
	DF	(Scotland) SCO	Alan Lithgow	40	4	32+0	4	1+0	0	1+0	0	6+0	0
	DF	(Scotland) SCO	Jamie Lyden	8	2	5+1	2	0+0	0	1+0	0	1+0	0
	DF	(Scotland) SCO	Dominic Kennedy	9	0	7+1	0	0+0	0	0+0	0	1+0	0
	DF	(Scotland) SCO	Ryan Finnie	15	0	11+3	0	0+0	0	0+0	0	1+0	0
	MF	(Scotland) SCO	Scott Agnew	42	13	35+0	13	0+0	0	1+0	0	6+0	0
	MF	(Scotland) SCO	Mark Lamont	13	0	8+4	0	0+0	0	0+0	0	0+1	0
	MF	(Scotland) SCO	Ryan Borris	17	0	6+10	0	1+0	0	0+0	0	0+0	0
	MF	(Scotland) SCO	Mark Gilhaney	42	9	33+1	7	1+0	0	1+0	0	6+0	2
	MF	(Scotland) SCO	Martin McBride	8	1	5+0	1	0+0	0	1+0	0	2+0	0
	MF	(Scotland) SCO	Martin McNiff	35	2	28+1	2	1+0	0	0+0	0	5+0	0
	MF	(Scotland) SCO	Adam Monaghan	3	0	1+0	0	0+0	0	0+1	0	1+0	0
	MF	(Scotland) SCO	Gary McKell	2	0	1+1	0	0+0	0	0+0	0	0+0	0
	MF	(Scotland) SCO	David Gray	5	0	2+1	0	0+0	0	0+0	0	0+2	0
	MF	(France) FRA	Arlan Kadina Mptata	4	0	2+2	0	0+0	0	0+0	0	0+0	0
	MF	(Scotland) SCO	Glen Thomson	1	1	0+1	1	0+0	0	0+0	0	0+0	0
	FW	(Scotland) SCO	Ryan Metcalfe	4	0	0+1	0	0+0	0	0+1	0	0+2	0
	FW	(Scotland) SCO	Kieran Brannan	15	0	1+10	0	0+1	0	1+0	0	1+1	0
	FW	(Scotland) SCO	Bryan Prunty	41	17	32+1	14	1+0	0	1+0	0	6+0	3
	FW	(Scotland) SCO	Graeme Ramage	9	0	0+5	0	0+1	0	1+0	0	1+1	0
	FW	(Scotland) SCO	Patrick Walker	42	4	22+14	3	0+1	0	0+0	0	3+2	1
	FW	(England) ENG	John Hempstead	2	0	1+1	0	0+0	0	0+0	0	0+0	0
	FW	(Scotland) SCO	David Winters	13	1	2+10	1	1+0	0	0+0	0	0+0	0
	FW	(Scotland) SCO	Ally Graham	19	2	10+7	2	0+0	0	0+0	0	0+2	0
	FW	(Scotland) SCO	Craig Dargo	12	7	7+2	5	0+0	0	0+0	0	3+0	2

a. Includes other competitive competitions, including the play-offs and the 2011–12 Scottish Challenge Cup.

=== Disciplinary record ===
Includes all competitive matches.

Last updated 26 May 2012

Nation	Position	Name	Scottish Second Division		Scottish Cup		League Cup		Challenge Cup		Total	
Nation	Position	Name	Booked	Sent off (straight red)	Booked	Sent off (straight red)	Booked	Sent off (straight red)	Booked	Sent off (straight red)	Booked	Sent off (straight red)
(Scotland)	GK	Jamie Ewings	0	0	0	0	0	0	0	0	0	0
(Scotland)	GK	Stephen Grindlay	0	0	0	0	0	0	0	0	0	0
(France)	GK	Arnaud Gastal	0	0	0	0	0	0	0	0	0	0
(Scotland)	DF	James Creaney	6	0	0	0	0	0	1	0	7	0
(Scotland)	DF	Robert Connolly	0	0	0	0	0	0	0	0	0	0
(Scotland)	DF	Ross McKinnon	1	0	0	0	0	0	0	0	1	0
(Scotland)	DF	Kevin Nicoll	10	0	0	0	0	0	3	0	13	0
(Scotland)	DF	Paul Nugent	6	0	1	0	1	0	2	1	10	1
(Scotland)	DF	Tony Wallace	2	0	0	0	0	0	2	0	4	0
(Scotland)	DF	Alan Lithgow	3	1	0	0	0	0	0	0	3	1
(Scotland)	DF	Jamie Lyden	1	0	0	0	0	0	0	1	1	1
(Scotland)	DF	Ryan Finnie	0	0	0	0	0	0	0	0	0	0
(Scotland)	MF	Scott Agnew	7	0	0	0	0	0	0	0	7	0
(Scotland)	MF	Mark Lamont	0	0	0	0	0	0	0	0	0	0
(Scotland)	MF	Ryan Borris	0	0	0	0	0	0	0	0	0	0
(Scotland)	MF	Mark Gilhaney	5	0	0	0	1	0	1	0	7	0
(Scotland)	MF	Martin McBride	0	0	0	0	0	0	0	0	0	0
(Scotland)	MF	Martin McNiff	5	0	0	0	0	0	0	0	5	0
(Scotland)	MF	Adam Monaghan	0	0	0	0	0	0	0	0	0	0
(Scotland)	MF	Gary McKell	0	0	0	0	0	0	0	0	0	0
(Scotland)	MF	David Gray	0	0	0	0	0	0	0	0	0	0
(France)	MF	Arlan Kadina Mptata	1	0	0	0	0	0	0	0	1	0
(Scotland)	MF	Glen Thomson	0	0	0	0	0	0	0	0	0	0
(Scotland)	FW	Ryan Metcalfe	0	0	0	0	0	0	0	0	0	0
(Scotland)	FW	Kieran Brannan	1	0	0	0	0	0	0	0	1	0
(Scotland)	FW	Bryan Prunty	2	0	0	0	0	0	1	0	3	0
(Scotland)	FW	Graeme Ramage	1	0	0	0	0	0	0	0	1	0
(Scotland)	FW	Patrick Walker	1	0	0	0	0	0	1	0	2	0
(England)	FW	John Hempstead	0	0	0	0	0	0	0	0	0	0
(Scotland)	FW	David Winters	0	0	0	0	0	0	0	0	0	0
(Scotland)	FW	Ally Graham	1	0	0	0	0	0	0	0	1	0
(Scotland)	FW	Craig Dargo	2	0	0	0	0	0	2	0	4	0

=== Awards ===
Last updated 27 February 2012

Nation	Name	Award	Month
(Scotland)	Alan Adamson	Second Division Manager of the Month	January
(Scotland)	Alan Adamson	Second Division Manager of the Month	February

== Team statistics ==
=== League table ===
Pos	Team	Pld	W	D	L	GF	GA	GD	Pts	Promotion, qualification or relegation
1	Cowdenbeath (C, P)	36	20	11	5	68	29	+39	71	Promotion to the First Division
2	Arbroath	36	17	12	7	76	51	+25	63	Qualification for the First Division play-offs
3	Dumbarton (O, P)	36	17	7	12	61	61	0	58 (Note: Dumbarton won the First Division play-off final, and were promoted to the First Division.)	Qualification for the First Division play-offs
4	Airdrie United (P)	36	14	10	12	68	60	+8	52 (Note: Airdrie United lost the final of the First Division playoffs to Dumbarton. However following the demotion of Rangers to the third division prior to the beginning of the 2012-13 season, Dundee were promoted from the First Division to the SPL, and Airdrie United were promoted to the First Division to take their place. Stranraer were promoted from the Third to the Second Division to take the place of Airdrie United)	Qualification for the First Division play-offs
5	Stenhousemuir	36	15	6	15	54	49	+5	51	

Source: SPFL Archive
Rules for classification: 1) points; 2) goal difference; 3) number of goals scored.
(C) Champions; (O) Play-off winners; (P) Promoted

== Transfers ==
=== Players in ===
Player	From	Fee
(Scotland) Adam Monaghan	(Scotland) St Patricks FP	Free
(Scotland) Bryan Prunty	(Scotland) Alloa Athletic	Free
(Scotland) Ryan Borris	(Scotland) Stirling Albion	Free
(Scotland) Scott Agnew	(Scotland) Stranraer	Free
(Scotland) Kevin Nicoll	(Scotland) Stranraer	Free
(Scotland) Alan Lithgow	(Scotland) Clyde	Free
(Scotland) Martin McBride	(Scotland) Queen's Park	Free
(Scotland) Jamie Ewings	(Scotland) Alloa Athletic	Free
(Scotland) Graeme Ramage	(Scotland) St Mirren	Free
(Scotland) David Winters	(Vietnam) Cần Thơ	Free
(Scotland) Ross McKinnon	(Scotland) Motherwell	Loan
(Scotland) Dominic Kennedy	(Scotland) St Mirren	Loan
(Scotland) Ally Graham	(Scotland) Falkirk	Loan
(Scotland) Mark Lamont	(Scotland) St Mirren	Loan
(Scotland) Ryan Finnie	(Scotland) Hamilton Academical	Loan
(Scotland) David Gray	(United States) Kitsap Pumas	Free
(France) Arnaud Gastal	(France) LB Châteauroux	Free
(Scotland) Craig Dargo	(Scotland) Partick Thistle	Free
(France) Arlan Kadina Mpata	(France) Entente Sannois St Gratien	Free

=== Players out ===
Player	To	Fee
(Scotland) Andy Geggan	(Scotland) Ayr United	Free
(Scotland) Nicky Devlin	(Scotland) Motherwell	Free
(Scotland) Iain Chisholm	(Scotland) East Stirlingshire	Free
(Scotland) Ross Campbell	Free agent	Free
(Scotland) Alan Cook	(Scotland) Stirling Albion	Free
(Scotland) Liam Mushet	(Scotland) Lanark United	Free
(Scotland) Michael White	(Scotland) Arbroath	Free
(Scotland) Derek Carcary	(Scotland) Brechin City	Free
(Scotland) Scott Chaplain	(Scotland) Albion Rovers	Free
(Scotland) Ben Gordon	(Scotland) Alloa Athletic	Free
(Scotland) Ryan McStay	(Scotland) Albion Rovers	Free
(Scotland) Martin McBride	(Scotland) Queen's Park	Loan
(Scotland) Adam Monaghan	(Scotland) Kilbirnie Ladeside	Loan
(Scotland) Robert Connolly	(Scotland) Kilbirnie Ladeside	Loan
(Scotland) Adam Monaghan	(Scotland) Kilbirnie Ladeside	Loan
(Scotland) David Winters	(Scotland) Annan Athletic	Free
(Scotland) Martin McBride	(Scotland) Queen's Park	Free
(Scotland) Kieran Brannan	(Scotland) Clyde	Loan
(Scotland) Graeme Ramage	(Scotland) East Stirlingshire	Loan
(Scotland) Ryan Borris	(Scotland) Stranraer	Loan

== Factfile ==
* The League match against Airdrie United on 21 January marked Ryan Borris's 100th appearance for Dumbarton in all national competitions - the 132nd Dumbarton player to reach this milestone.

== See also ==
- List of Dumbarton F.C. seasons
