= Ryan Finnie =

Scottish footballer (born 1995)

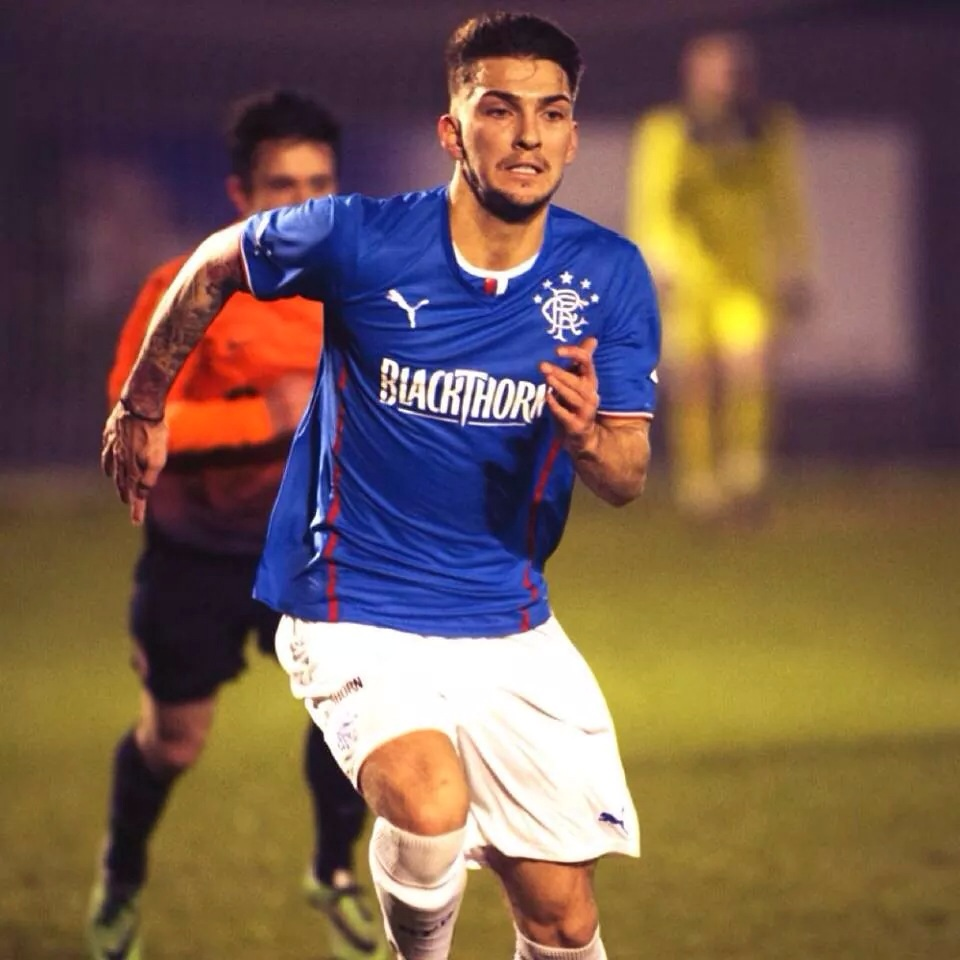
- Finnie playing for Rangers in March 2014

Personal information
- Date of birth: 19 February 1995 (age 31)
- Place of birth: Law, South Lanarkshire, Scotland
- Position: Right back

Youth career
- Hamilton Academical

Senior career*
Years	Team	Apps	(Gls)
2011–2014	Hamilton Academical	5	(0)
2012	→ Dumbarton (loan)	14	(0)
2014–2015	Rangers	0	(0)
2015	Partick Thistle	0	(0)
2015–2016	Annan Athletic	13	(1)
2016	Alloa Athletic	7	(0)
2016–2017	Annan Athletic	12	(0)
2017	Clyde	7	(0)
2017–2018	Grange Thistle		
2018	IFK Östersund	8	(0)
2018–2019	Edinburgh City	0	(0)
2019	Caledonian Braves		
2019	IFK Mora		
2019–2020	Queen's Park	14	(1)
2020–2021	Berwick Rangers	11	(0)
2021	→ Cowdenbeath (loan)	14	(0)
2021–2022	Spartans		

International career^{‡}
2011	Scotland U16	1	(0)
2011–2012	Scotland U17	8	(0)
2013	Scotland U18	1	(0)
2013	Scotland U19	1	(0)
- * Club domestic league appearances and goals as of 21:00, 18 November 2021 (UTC) ‡ National team caps and goals as of 22:17, 25 March 2014 (UTC)

Ryan Finnie (born 19 February 1995) is a Scottish professional footballer who used to play for Spartans.

Finnie has previously played for Hamilton Academical, Dumbarton, Rangers, Partick Thistle, Annan Athletic, Alloa Athletic, Clyde, Grange Thistle, IFK Östersund, Edinburgh City, Caledonian Braves, IFK Mora, Queen's Park, Berwick Rangers, and Cowdenbeath.

== Club career ==
Born in Law, South Lanarkshire Finnie moved on loan from Hamilton Academical to Dumbarton in January 2012. He left Hamilton in January 2014, and in March of the same year signed for Rangers on a short-term deal. He signed for Partick Thistle in January 2015, and was released by them at the end of the season.

Finnie then spent the summer of 2015 playing as a trialist for a number of different clubs, including Brechin City and Dunfermline Athletic. He eventually signed for Scottish League Two side Annan Athletic in September 2015, making his debut against Arbroath and scoring his only goal for the side in December 2015 against Montrose.

Finnie left Galabank in February 2016, signing for Scottish Championship side Alloa Athletic shortly after. Following Alloa's relegation from the Scottish Championship Finnie was released by the club, after which he subsequently re-signed for Annan. Finnie left Annan on 7 January 2017, and on 13 January 2017, joined fellow Scottish League Two side Clyde until the end of the 2016–17 season. Finnie was released by the club following the end of his contract.

After leaving Clyde, Finnie moved to Australia in June 2017, signing for Brisbane Premier League club Grange Thistle on 9 June 2017.

After a spell with Swedish club IFK Östersund, he signed for Edinburgh City in October 2018.

In January 2019 he was playing for Edusport. Finnie went back to Sweden to sign for IFK Mora in August 2019. Finnie returned to Scotland in November and signed for Queen's Park.

Finnie signed with Berwick Rangers on 7 October 2020 and later joined Cowdenbeath on loan on 9 March 2021.

Finnie departed Berwick Rangers by mutual agreement on 27 October 2021.

Spartans announced the signing of Finnie on 18 November 2021.

== International career ==
He was called up by the Scotland under-19 squad for the first time in April 2013.

He has played for Scotland at under-16, under-17, under-18 and under-19 level.

== Career statistics ==
As of 12 June 2017

Club	Season	League		FA Cup		League Cup		Other		Total	
Club	Season	Apps	Goals	Apps	Goals	Apps	Goals	Apps	Goals	Apps	Goals
Hamilton Academical	2012–13	4	0	0	0	0	0	0	0	4	0
Hamilton Academical	2013–14	1	0	0	0	0	0	0	0	1	0
Hamilton Academical	Total	5	0	0	0	0	0	0	0	5	0
Dumbarton (loan)	2011–12	14	0	0	0	0	0	0	0	14	0
Rangers	2013–14	0	0	0	0	0	0	0	0	0	0
Partick Thistle	2014–15	0	0	0	0	0	0	0	0	0	0
Annan Athletic	2015–16	13	1	4	0	0	0	0	0	17	1
Alloa Athletic	2015–16	7	0	0	0	0	0	0	0	7	0
Annan Athletic	2016–17	12	0	2	0	1	1	1	0	16	1
Clyde	2016–17	7	0	0	0	0	0	0	0	7	0
Career total		58	1	6	0	1	1	1	0	66	2
