= 2005–06 Scottish First Division =

Scottish First Division
- Season: 2005–06
- Champions: St Mirren
- Promoted: St Mirren
- Relegated: Stranraer; Brechin City
- Top goalscorer: Bryan Prunty (15); Jason Scotland (15)

The 2005–06 Scottish First Division was won by St Mirren.

As league champions, St Mirren were promoted to the Scottish Premier League.

Allan Jenkins scored the Stranraer winner on a 2 January South West relegation derby leaving Queen of the South firmly in the play off spot that was ninth place. However Jenkins was sold to Gretna 10 days later. Stranraer's league form imploded immediately recording only one other league win from then until the season's end. Queens over hauled Stranraer who subsequently lost in a relegation playoff semi-final to be relegated along with Brechin City to the Scottish Second Division.

Scottish Second Division winners Gretna and playoff winners Partick Thistle were promoted.

== League table ==
Pos	Team	Pld	W	D	L	GF	GA	GD	Pts	Promotion, qualification or relegation
1	St Mirren (C, P)	36	23	7	6	52	28	+24	76	Promotion to the Premier League
2	St Johnstone	36	18	12	6	59	34	+25	66	
3	Hamilton Academical	36	15	14	7	53	39	+14	59	
4	Ross County	36	14	14	8	47	40	+7	56	
5	Clyde	36	15	10	11	54	42	+12	55	
6	Airdrie United	36	11	12	13	57	43	+14	45	
7	Dundee	36	9	16	11	43	50	−7	43	
8	Queen of the South	36	7	12	17	31	54	−23	33	
9	Stranraer (R)	36	5	14	17	33	53	−20	29	Qualification for the First Division Play-offs
10	Brechin City (R)	36	2	11	23	28	74	−46	17	Relegation to the Second Division

Source: "2005-2006 First Division - SPFL Archive". SPFL.
Rules for classification: 1) points; 2) goal difference; 3) number of goals scored.
(C) Champions; (P) Promoted; (R) Relegated

== Top scorers ==
Player	Club	Goals
(Scotland) Bryan Prunty	Airdrie United	15
(Trinidad and Tobago) Jason Scotland	St Johnstone	15
(England) John Sutton	St Mirren	14
(Scotland) Alex Williams	Clyde	13
(Scotland) Simon Lynch	Dundee	13
(Scotland) Stewart Kean	St Mirren	12
(Scotland) John Rankin	Ross County	12
(Scotland) Stephen O'Donnell	Clyde	11

== Attendances ==
The average attendances for First Division clubs for season 2005/06 are shown below:

Club	Average
St Mirren	3,995
Dundee	3,797
St Johnstone	2,667
Ross County	2,302
Queen of the South	1,804
Hamilton Academical	1,761
Airdrie United	1,426
Clyde	1,284
Brechin City	770
Stranraer	654

== First Division play-offs ==
The playoff semi-finals took place on 3 May 2006 and 6 May 2006. The final took place on 10 May 2006 and 14 May 2006.

=== Semi-finals ===
The ninth placed team in the First Division played the fourth placed team in the Second Division and third placed team in the Second Division played the second placed team in the Second Division. The play-offs were played over two legs, the winning team in each semi-final advanced to the final.

Team 1	Agg.	Team 2	1st leg	2nd leg
Stranraer	3 – 4	Partick Thistle	1–3	2–1
Morton	0 – 1	Peterhead	0–0	0–1

=== Final ===
The two semi-final winners played each other over two legs. The winning team was awarded a place in the 2007–08 First Division.

Team 1	Agg.	Team 2	1st leg	2nd leg
Partick Thistle	3 – 3	Peterhead	1–2	2–1

- Partick Thistle win 4–2 on penalties, aet
