= Chris McMenamin =

Scottish footballer

Personal information
- Full name: Chris McMenamin
- Date of birth: 2 January 1989 (age 37)
- Place of birth: Glasgow, Scotland
- Height: 5 ft 11 in (1.80 m)
- Position: Defender

Team information
- Current team: Berwick Rangers

Senior career*
Years	Team	Apps	(Gls)
2007–2009	Airdrie United	2	(0)
2008–2009	→ Berwick Rangers (loan)	24	(3)
2009–	Berwick Rangers	0	(0)
2009–2010	Linlithgow Rose		
- * Club domestic league appearances and goals as of 15:37, 16 January 2009 (UTC)

Chris McMenamin (born 2 January 1989 in Glasgow) is a Scottish footballer.

After spending much of last season on loan with Berwick while an Airdrie United player, defender Chris has now joined Berwick on a permanent basis. During his loan stint Chris, who made just a handful of first team appearances while at Airdrie United, made 24 appearances for Berwick last season and scored three times. Won SFL Young Player of Month during last season.

January 2010, Berwick Rangers have loaned former Airdrie youngster Chris McMenamin to junior side Linlithgow Rose
