= Kevin Watt =

Scottish footballer

Personal information
- Full name: Kevin Watt
- Date of birth: 1 October 1989 (age 37)
- Place of birth: Bellshill, Scotland
- Height: 5 ft 7 in (1.70 m)
- Position: Striker

Senior career*
Years	Team	Apps	(Gls)
2007–2010	Airdrie United	47	(5)
2008	→ Albion Rovers (loan)	4	(3)
2010	Bo'ness United	30	(17)
2012–2015	Clyde	88	(19)
2018-2019	Linlithgow Rose		
- * Club domestic league appearances and goals as of 14 January 2014

Kevin Watt (born 1 October 1989) is a Scottish professional footballer who plays for Clyde.

== Clyde ==
After a good season in the junior ranks with Bo'ness United, Jim Duffy brought 22-year-old Watt back into senior football with Clyde. Watt made his début for the Bully Wee when they were 2–0 down away at Montrose, but after an improved second half they went on to win the game 3–2. On 16 February 2013, Watt scored against Rangers in a 4–1 defeat at Broadwood.

Watt played for Linlithgow Rose in 2018–2019.
