= Paul Nugent (Scottish footballer) =

Scottish footballer

Personal information
- Full name: Paul Brian Nugent
- Date of birth: 4 April 1983 (age 43)
- Place of birth: Alexandria, Scotland
- Position: Defender

Senior career*
| Years | Team | Apps | (Gls) |
| 2000–2001 | Clyde | 0 | (0) |
| 2001–2008 | Stirling Albion | 186 | (5) |
| 2008–2010 | East Fife | 44 | (0) |
| 2010–2012 | Dumbarton | 65 | (0) |
- * Club domestic league appearances and goals as of 24 May 2015

Paul Brian Nugent (born 4 April 1983 in Alexandria) is a Scottish former professional footballer, who played for Scottish Second Division club Dumbarton as well as East Fife, Stirling Albion and Clyde.

== Career ==
Nugent signed for Stirling Albion after failing to break into the Clyde first team and made his debut on 6 November 2001 against Celtic. Over seven seasons, Nugent made 186 league appearances for the Binos, scoring 5 goals. Nugent won the 2006-07 season Goal of the Season award for his goal against Airdrie United in the first game of the Scottish First Division play off final at Forthbank Stadium. Nugent was an unlikely candidate to gain an award in the 2006–07 season due to missing most of the season due to injury.

Nugent signed for East Fife in June 2008. He was released at the end of the 2009–10 season and signed by Dumbarton shortly after, where he has been moved into a central defensive role, as opposed to his regular position - right back. Paul had a successful season with Dumbarton and re-signed for another year. He was sent off late on in the playoff final first leg and therefore missed the second leg which Dumbarton won 4-1 After captaining the side to promotion in 2011-12 he left the club due to work commitments that summer.
