= Ally Graham (footballer, born 1993) =

Scottish footballer

Personal information
- Date of birth: 29 April 1993 (age 33)
- Place of birth: Scotland
- Position: Forward

Senior career*
Years	Team	Apps	(Gls)
2011–2013	Falkirk	3	(0)
2011–2012	→ Dumbarton (loan)	17	(2)
- * Club domestic league appearances and goals as of 20:17, 25 February 2012 (UTC)

Ally Graham (born 29 April 1993) is a Scottish professional footballer, who played for Dumbarton and Falkirk.

== Career ==
Graham made his first team debut on 30 July 2011 as a substitute in Falkirk's 4–2 win over Albion Rovers in the Scottish League Cup. He went on to make his league debut as a substitute on 6 August 2011 against Raith Rovers at Starks Park. Graham scored his first goal for Falkirk against Dundee United in a Scottish League Cup fixture on 25 October 2011.

He joined Scottish Second Division side Dumbarton on 16 December 2011 on a 28-day loan.

== Career statistics ==
As of 20 December 2011

Club statistics
Club	Season	League		Cup		Lg Cup		Other		Total	
Club	Season	Apps	Goals	Apps	Goals	Apps	Goals	Apps	Goals	Apps	Goals
Falkirk	2011–12	3	0	0	0	2	1	0	0	5	1
Falkirk	Total	3	0	0	0	2	1	0	0	5	1
Dumbarton	2011–12	17	2	0	0	0	0	2	0	19	2
Career total		17	2	0	0	2	1	2	0	24	3
