= Bryan Prunty =

Scottish footballer (born 1983)

Personal information
- Date of birth: 12 January 1983 (age 43)
- Place of birth: Airdrie, Scotland
- Position: Striker

Team information
- Current team: Airdrieonians (First Team Coach)

Youth career
- –2002: Celtic

Senior career*
Years	Team	Apps	(Gls)
2002–2004	Celtic	0	(0)
2004	Aberdeen	18	(2)
2004–2005	Inverness Caledonian Thistle	27	(2)
2005–2008	Airdrie United	85	(22)
2008–2009	Ayr United	41	(15)
2009–2010	→ Stirling Albion (loan)	3	(0)
2010–2011	Alloa Athletic	47	(16)
2011–2014	Dumbarton	99	(31)
2014–2016	Airdrieonians	58	(18)
2016–2018	Arbroath	32	(2)
2018	East Kilbride		
2018	BSC Glasgow		
2018	Cumbernauld United		

International career
2003	Scotland U20	1	(1)
2004	Scotland U21	3	(0)
- * Club domestic league appearances and goals

Bryan Prunty (born 12 January 1983) is a Scottish former footballer who is on the backroom staff at Scottish Championship club Airdrieonians.

== Career ==
=== Club ===
Prunty began his career with Celtic, but he failed to make a senior appearance. In January 2004, he moved to fellow Scottish Premier League club Aberdeen, making his senior debut in a Scottish Cup replay victory against Dundee on 21 January 2004. His first senior goal came on 27 March 2004 in a 3–1 defeat against Kilmarnock. At the end of the 2003–04 season, Prunty was told by manager Jimmy Calderwood that he could leave the club.

On 6 August 2004, Prunty signed for Inverness Caledonian Thistle. A year later he joined Airdrie United where he was recognised as the club's 2005–06 Player of the Year. Prunty then signed for Airdrie's Second Division rivals Ayr United in May 2008. In May 2009, he was recognised by his fellow professionals as 2nd Division player of the year for 2008–2009.

Prunty spent part of the 2009–10 season on loan at Stirling Albion. It was widely believed Prunty would sign permanently for Stirling in January 2010, but instead he was snapped up by Alloa Athletic. Prunty scored on his Alloa debut in a 2–0 win over Stenhousemuir.

On 16 May 2011, Prunty then joined Dumbarton. In February 2012, he scored an overhead kick against Stenhousemuir which was voted as SFL Goal of the Month, then a year later won the same award after scoring a stunning overhead bicycle kick from the edge of the box in a match against Livingston in February 2013, which was reported to have been viewed so many times it caused the Livingston club website to crash. The goal was also voted Goal of the Season at both the PFA Scotland and Scottish Football League end of season awards. On 16 May 2013, Prunty agreed a new one-year contract with Dumbarton. In May 2014 Prunty agreed a new one-year deal with Dumbarton.

Despite only signing a new deal in May 2014, Prunty joined Scottish League One Airdrieonians on 30 August 2014. He left the club in May 2016 after it was announced Airdrie would be operating full-time from June 2016, signing for Scottish League Two side Arbroath shortly after. After 18 months with the Red Lichties, Prunty signed for Lowland League side East Kilbride in January 2018. After five months with EK, he joined fellow Lowland League side BSC Glasgow in June 2018. He only spent a short period with BSC before joining Scottish Junior Football Association side Cumbernauld United.

=== Coaching career ===
Prunty left Cumbernauld United in November 2018 to join the coaching staff at Airdrieonians, working alongside former manager Ian Murray.

=== International ===
Prunty played and scored for the Scotland Under-20 side in 2003 against Portugal. He also played three times for the Under-21 side in 2004.

== Career statistics ==
As of match played 28 April 2018

Appearances and goals by club, season and competition
Club	Season	League			Scottish Cup		League Cup		Other		Total	
Club	Season	Division	Apps	Goals	Apps	Goals	Apps	Goals	Apps	Goals	Apps	Goals
Aberdeen	2003–04	Premier League	18	2	4	0	0	0	—		22	2
Inverness Caledonian Thistle	2004–05	Premier League	17	2	1	0	1	0	—		19	2
Airdrie United	2005–06	First Division	31	15	3	0	0	0	1 (Note: Appearances in the Scottish Challenge Cup)	0	35	15
Airdrie United	2006–07	First Division	25	2	1	0	2	1	0	0	28	3
Airdrie United	2007–08	Second Division	29	5	3	0	0	0	6 (Note: Two appearances in the Scottish Challenge Cup; four appearances and a goal in the First Division play-offs)	1	38	6
Airdrie United	Total		85	22	7	0	2	1	7	1	101	24
Ayr United	2008–09	Second Division	31	15	2	1	2	0	5 (Note: One appearance in the Scottish Challenge Cup; four appearances and a goal in the First Division play-offs)	1	40	17
Ayr United	2009–10	First Division	10	0	0	0	1	0	1	0	12	0
Ayr United	Total		41	15	2	1	3	0	6	1	52	17
Stirling Albion (loan)	2009–10	Second Division	3	0	0	0	—		—		3	0
Alloa Athletic	2009–10	Second Division	18	8	0	0	—		2 (Note: Appearances in the First Division play-offs)	0	20	8
Alloa Athletic	2010–11	Second Division	29	8	1	0	1	0	2 (Note: Appearances in the Second Division play-offs)	0	33	8
Alloa Athletic	Total		47	16	1	0	1	0	4	0	53	16
Dumbarton	2011–12	Second Division	33	14	0	0	1	0	1	1	35	15
Dumbarton	2012–13	First Division	34	11	1	0	2	1	0	0	37	12
Dumbarton	2013–14	Championship	30	6	4	1	2	0	1	0	37	7
Dumbarton	2014–15	Championship	2	0	0	0	2	0	1	0	5	0
Dumbarton	Total		99	31	5	1	7	1	3	1	114	34
Airdrieonians	2014–15	League One	30	14	2	0	—		0	0	32	14
Airdrieonians	2015–16	League One	28	4	2	1	2	0	1	0	33	5
Airdrieonians	Total		58	18	4	1	2	0	1	0	65	19
Arbroath	2016–17	League Two	28	2	1	0	4	0	1	0	34	2
Arbroath	2017–18	League One	8	0	1	0	1	0	1	0	11	0
Arbroath	Total		36	2	2	0	5	0	2	0	47	2
Career total			404	108	26	3	21	2	23	3	476	116

== Honours ==
- SFL Player of the Month: December 2005, November 2008
- PFA Scotland Second Division Player of the Season: 2008–09
- SFL Goal of the season: 2012–13
- PFA Scotland Goal of the Season: 2012–13

Arbroath

- Scottish League Two (fourth tier): Winners 2016–17
