= Brian McPhee =

Scottish footballer

Personal information
- Full name: Brian McPhee
- Date of birth: 23 October 1970 (age 56)
- Place of birth: Glasgow, Scotland
- Height: 5 ft 10 in (1.78 m)
- Position: Striker

Senior career*
Years	Team	Apps	(Gls)
- Rutherglen Amateurs
1993–1996	Queen's Park	84	(19)
1996–1998	Airdrieonians	36	(20)
1998–2001	Livingston	83	(26)
2001	→ Clyde (loan)	4	(0)
2001–2005	Hamilton Academical	107	(36)
2005–2007	Airdrie United	55	(11)
2007	→ Stranraer (loan)	7	(0)
2007–2008	Dumbarton	23	(4)
2008–2010	Bathgate Thistle		
2010–2011	Cambuslang Rangers		
2011–2013	Kirkhill AFC		
2013–2014	Wishaw Juniors		
- * Club domestic league appearances and goals as of 27 April 2013

Brian McPhee (born 23 October 1970 in Glasgow, Scotland) is a Scottish retired footballer who last played for Wishaw Juniors. He had a long career as a striker in the Scottish Football League with several clubs.

== Career ==
McPhee joined Queen's Park in 1993 and turned professional with Airdrieonians in 1996. During his time at Airdrie, McPhee narrowly missed out on promotion to the Premier Division when the club lost in an end of season play-off to Hibernian in 1997.

After growing dissatisfied with his regular use as a substitute by manager Alex MacDonald, McPhee rejected a new contract offer from Airdrie and after trials in Greece and Holland, signed for Livingston in July 1998. Livingston won the Division One title in 2001 however after not featuring in the early matches of the following seasons Premier Division campaign, McPhee asked to be placed on the transfer list.

He subsequently moved on a month's loan to Clyde before joining Hamilton Academical in November 2001. In 2002 McPhee (who is of mixed race) was subjected to racist abuse from a supporter while playing for Hamilton against Albion Rovers.

During his spell at Hamilton McPhee went part-time after commencing training with Strathclyde Fire and Rescue Service in Glasgow. He was in attendance in the aftermath of the Stockline Plastics factory explosion in 2004.

McPhee joined Airdrie United in 2005 and after further spells at Stranraer (on loan) and Dumbarton, he moved on to Junior football with Bathgate Thistle and Cambuslang Rangers. After a spell playing local amateur football with Kirkhill AFC, McPhee joined Wishaw Juniors in April 2013.

He retired in 2014 to concentrate on his career as a firefighter, and became involved in charity fundraising for impoverished people in Kenya after visiting the country.
